= Amelia Bence =

Argentine actress (1914–2016)

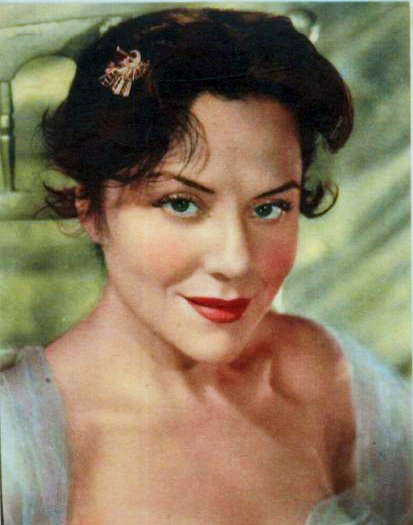
Portrait by Annemarie Heinrich, c. 1945

Amelia Bence (born María Amelia Batvinik; 13 November 1914 – 8 February 2016) was an Argentine film actress and one of the divas of the Golden Age of Argentine cinema during the 1930s and 1950s.

Born to Belarusian Jewish immigrants, Bence began her career at a young age, studying with Alfonsina Storni at the Lavardén Children's Theater and with Mecha Quintana at the Conservatorio Nacional de Música y Declamación (National Conservatory of Music and Speech). She made her film debut in 1933, in only the second sound film of Argentina, Dancing, by Luis Moglia Barth. Bence's acting in La guerra gaucha (1942), one of the most important films in the history of Argentine cinema, gave her recognition and earned her leading role offers. She starred in films such as Los ojos más lindos del mundo (1943), Todo un hombre, Camino del infierno (1946), A sangre fría (1947), La otra y yo (1949) and Danza del fuego (1949), garnering the Best Actress award from the Argentine Academy of Cinematography Arts and Sciences for Todo un hombre, A sangre fría and Danza del fuego. Bence also won the Silver Condor Award for Best Actress for Lauracha (1946), and her work was acknowledged with awards in Spain, Cuba, and the United States throughout the 1940s and 1950s.

Bence married Spanish actor Alberto Closas in 1950, and after their divorce in 1955 she was in a relationship with Osvaldo Cattone in the 1960s. From 1952 to 1954, Bence was contracted by Reforma Films to film two movies in Mexico and earned high praise for her starring role in Alfonsina (1957), which was selected as the Argentine entry for the Berlin International Film Festival and won her an award from the Argentina Film Academy. She developed an extensive theater career in the 1960s, starring in works like "La dama del trébol", "Así es la vida", "Maribel y la extraña familia" and "El proceso de Mary Duggan".

From 1973 to 1976, she completed a long tour of Latin America and featured in "La valija" ("The Suitcase") at the Gramercy Arts Theater in New York City, which earned her an Association of Latin Entertainment Critics (ACE) Award for Best Foreign Actress. Bence's characterizations in "Doña Rosita, la soltera" (1975) and "La loba" (1982) in the United States and Peru were very successful.

During the last stage of her career, she acted in several television productions, including series such as Romina, Bianca and Las 24 horas.

In 1989, she received the Silver Condor for Lifetime Achievement Award, and later won awards in the same category at the Podesta Awards in 1992 and by the National Endowment for the Arts in 1997.

Between 1996 and 2010, she appeared in several theaters with her show "Alfonsina", which combined music and poetry. After a career spanning eight decades in entertainment, she retired in 2010.

== Biography ==
=== Early life ===
María Amelia Batvinik was born on 13 November 1914 in Buenos Aires, the youngest of seven children to Belarusian Jewish immigrants, Jaime Batvinik from Minsk, and Ana Zaguer from Pinsk. From an early age, she was drawn to acting and began performing alongside other neighborhood children in the courtyards of their homes. That was how she met Paulina Singerman, a neighbor, who suggested to Bence's mother that the child be enrolled in the Lavardén Children's Theater, operating in the Teatro Colón. At the age of five, she officially debuted, encouraged by the sisters Paulina and Berta Singerman, in poet Alfonsina Storni's work, "Juanita".

Bence recalled that the performance was not without mishap, as she accidentally swallowed a postage stamp she was to place on an envelope; she was distraught, but Storni praised the way she handled the situation. She completed her primary school studies at the Escuela General Roca, while simultaneously studying piano with her sister Esther at the Fontova Conservatory. From the age of ten, she worked as an elevator operator at Gath & Chaves. In her free time, she worked in an acting group led by Pedro Aleandro, the brother of Ben Molar, where she participated in the play Las campanas by Julio Sánchez Gardel.

Despite the opposition of her family to acting, Bence convinced her mother to let her continue studying. Due to no availability in the National Conservatory of Performing Arts, she decided to learn classical dance with Mecha Quintana at the National Conservatory of Music and Speech, where she briefly attended classes. Quintana assigned her a part in a ballet at the Opera Theatre of Musical Comedy "Wunder Bar" (1933), starring Armando and Enrique Discépolo. On one occasion, she filled-in for the star when the performer had an illness during the performance run.

=== Film and theater debuts ===
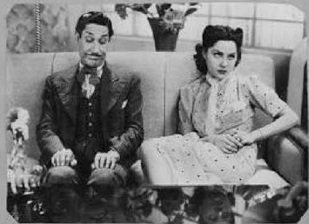
Bence teamed with León Zárate in El forastero (1937).

Bence's first film role was as an extra in a scene with Pedro Quartucci in Argentina's second sound film, Dancing (1933), under the direction of Luis José Moglia Barth, who bestowed the stage name "Amelia Bence" on her. The film was a failure and did not have the same success as the first sound film ¡Tango!.

The production had poor sound quality, audiences did not receive it well, and Bence was reluctant to include it in her filmography. She went back to the theater and began working under the direction of Enrique Susini in his company at the Odéon Theater, performing in such works as "Tu boca, Superficies", "Los malos tiempos" and "Baile en el Savoy", which were musical comedies and vaudeville shows. In "Baile en el Savoy", Bence replaced the star, Amanda Varela, who became ill and shared the stage with Florencio Parravicini.

The play was one of her first successes, having over 100 performances. When its run ended at the Odéon, it was transferred to the Cine Monumental and re-released for several more weeks. She and Parravicini also starred in "Ocho en línea" at the Corrientes Theater, but the reviews were scathing. El Mundo reported that "the show seemed unrehearsed" but praised Bence saying, "Newcomer ... , managing with grace and efficiency". In "Conde de Chantenay", which had a short run due to Parravicini's health, Bence was rated by the press as "demure, competent and pleasant" and in "De mí no se ríe nadie", which was directed by León Zárate, she appeared in 200 performances.

In 1937, Bence took a more serious role in Luis Saslavsky's drama La fuga, in which she supported Tita Merello and Santiago Arrieta. The performance earned Bence a contract with Olegario Ferrando at Pampa Film and three other film roles. After a long theatrical season with Luis Arata and inconsequential participation in El forastero, she filmed La vuelta al nido with José Gola. Bence defined the film as "one of the best of our cinema ... A simple and profound story ... very intimate, full of sensitive details ... it was not understood by critics or the public at the time".

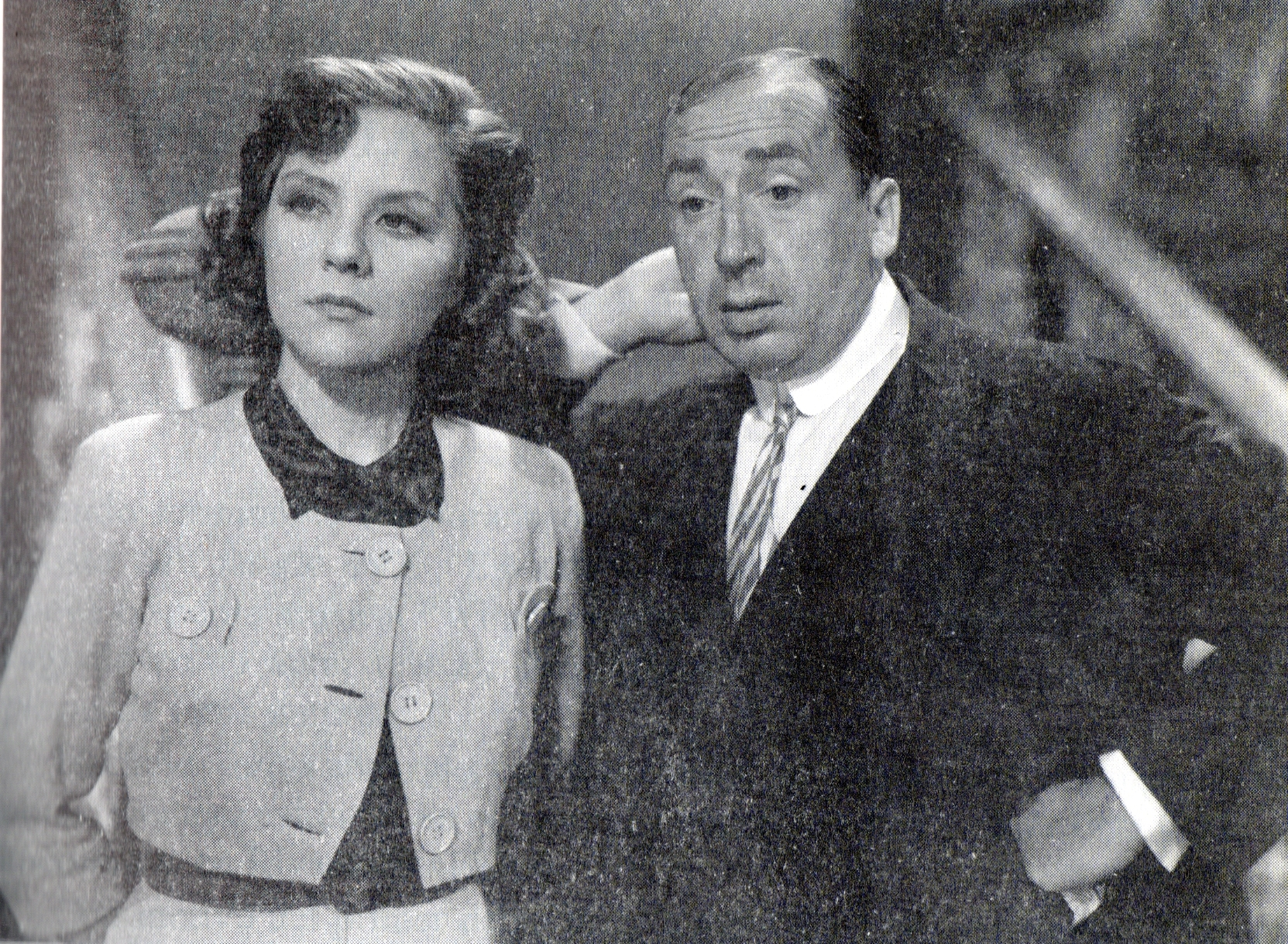
Bence with Pepe Arias in El haragán de la familia (1939)

In 1938, Leopoldo Torres Ríos gave Bence her first starring role in film in Adiós Buenos Aires, where she played a showgirl "Luisita" living a bohemian life. In November 1938, she attracted the attention of the public and press when she starred in the play Mujeres at the Smart Theatre, (currently Multiteatro) located on Avenida Corrientes. The play was written by American writer and actress Clare Boothe Luce and also starred Mecha Ortiz. In one of the scenes, Bence appeared bathing in a tub full of foam. She said: "I wore nylon mesh, it was very modest but, as was logical, it did not go unnoticed. I had a very big impact as a result of that scene ... so much so that, the Teatro Maipo ... made a parody of it". The work was described as "original, fresh, and modern", reaching 250 performances. It was revived at the Teatro Fénix de Flores.

=== Recognition and "The Gaucho War" ===
In the wake of her successful theatrical season, Bence filmed El matrero (1939) in Tucumán Province, in which she played "Pontezuela", a girl who falls in love with the character of Agustín Irusta, is accused of a crime and is rejected by her father. She won praise for her performance, and was hired to an exclusive three-year contract by Miguel Machinandiarena, who had just formed San Miguel Studios, which would soon become the largest studio in Argentina. Bence was hired to star opposite Tito Lusiardo in Antonio Momplet's Novios para las muchachas (1941), a comedy adapted from the play "Las de Caín". That same year she starred in Carlos F. Borcosque's La casa de los cuervos, based on a novel by Hugo Wast, which won her the Premios Sur for Best Actress from the Academy of Motion Picture Arts and Sciences of Argentina.

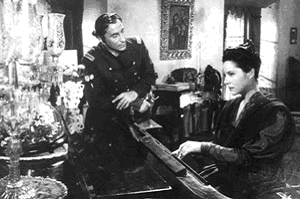
Sebastián Chiola and Amelia Bence in La guerra gaucha (1942)

In early 1942, Bence filmed El tercer beso, directed by Luis César Amadori and co-starring Pedro López Lagar and Silvia Legrand. Though Bence was concerned about playing the mother of Legrand, who was only 13 years younger than she was, the film was a success and she won her the Silver Condor Award for Best Actress from the Argentine Film Critics Association for the performance. The recognition led to her appearance frequently on the covers of magazines, and to an offer to appear in what would become one of the most important films in the history of Argentine cinema, La guerra gaucha. The film starred Bence and Sebastián Chiola, Ángel Magaña, Enrique Muiño, and Francisco Petrone and is set at the turn of the nineteenth century in northern Argentina. It was shot on location in Salta Province and was based on the novel of the same name by writer Leopoldo Lugones. Scriptwriters Hómero Manzi and Ulises Petit de Murat, wove the disparate stories of the characters into an overview of the gauchos' revolt against Spanish rule. The film, unlike Hollywood Westerns, neither portrayed colonization as progress, nor focused the action on the indigenous people, instead focusing on the patriotic pride of the gauchos. The film won seven awards and Bence won an award as best actress of the year from the City of Buenos Aires. It also earned her an offer from Paramount Pictures to come to the US and work in Hollywood, but she declined the offer.

=== A successful film star ===
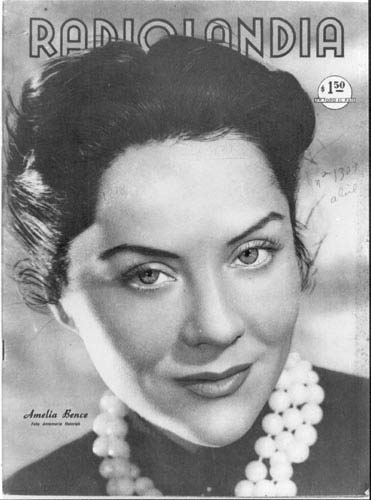
Amelia Bence on the cover of Radiolandia

After the success of La guerra gaucha, Bence received only starring roles. In 1943, she agreed to work with Pedro López Lagar on Son cartas de amor, a romantic story set at the time of the Spanish Civil War, in which she received an award for Best Actress from the Cuban Federation of Film and Theater Editors. In 1982 she donated the medal to a program raising funds to help the soldiers of the Falklands War. Later in 1943, she starred in Los ojos más lindos del mundo, (The Most Beautiful Eyes in the World). The title was a reference to the purplish green hue of Bence's eyes and the title became associated with her, to the point that when she toured Chile in 1955 and 1964, the press headlines read, "The most beautiful eyes in the world came here". Her next film, Todo un hombre (1943), was directed by Frenchman Pierre Chenal. In the final scene, Bence was replaced by a double because of the impossibility of postponing a trip to Brazil. She won the award for Best Actress from the Academy of Motion Picture Arts and Sciences for the film. The cover of the magazine Antena for December 1943 announced the upcoming release of Julio Saraceni's Nuestra Natacha, based on a play by Alejandro Casona. The film was released in September 1944, shortly after the presentation of her film 24 horas de la vida de una mujer, in which she played the role of "Cecilia", receiving good reviews in La Nación and Antena.

In 1946, Bence starred with Mecha Ortiz in Camino del infierno, a melodramatic, psychological thriller involving a love triangle. Despite their performances, the film was poorly received by the critics. San Miguel Studios next put all three of its stars, Mecha Ortiz, María Duval and Bence in one film, Las tres ratas (1946), under the direction of Carlos Schlieper, which fared much better with the public and critics. In the summer of 1944, Bence met the actor Alberto Closas in Chile while filming María Rosa, who would become her husband. Both María Rosa and the other film made in Chile, Lauracha (1946) ended up being delayed for release due to a dispute between Pampa Film, Lumiton and San Miguel Studios. The legal dispute between the director Ernesto Arancibia and the film companies took nearly two years to resolve. Despite the delay in release, the Association of Film Critics awarded Bence the Silver Condor Award for Best Actress, for a role which Hal Erickson in The New York Times describes as a "fiercely independent young woman", comparing the film to a "Joan Crawfordesque drama". Her next film, El pecado de Julia, featured Alberto Closas, with whom she had begun a relationship, and received mixed reviews.

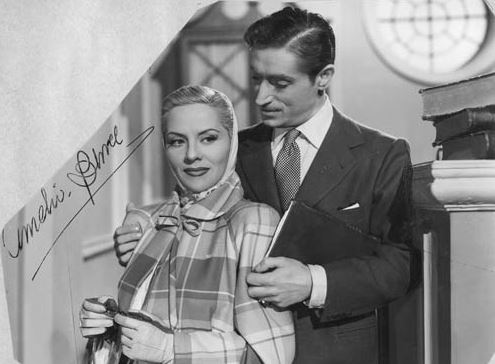
A still from the Argentine film "La otra y yo" ("The other and me") On the left, is the signature of the actress Amelia Bence, who is also standing on the left in the image with actor Enrique Álvarez Diosdado.

In 1947, Bence won the Writers Association award for Best Actress and the inaugural prize for the Hispanoamericano de Cinematografía in Madrid for her role as a wealthy but weak and vulnerable lady, mistreated by an evil nephew in Daniel Tinayre's murder drama, A sangre fría. For her role in Momplet 's La otra y yo (1949), which co-starred Enrique Álvarez Diosdado and Fernando Lamas, she dyed her hair blond to play two different characters—the film star "Dora Nelson" and the clothing designer "Matilde García". It amused and surprised the public, as there is a scene where the two characters talk to each other in the same frame. La Opinión praised her acting and the magazine El Hogar reported that she "soared beyond the script and the director". Bence again starred opposite Diosdado in Danza del fuego, in which played Elena Valdez, a successful concert pianist who died on her wedding night after falling out the window of her home, tortured and believing herself guilty of a crime. Her performance earned her the award for Best Actress in 1949 from both Writers Association and the Academy of Motion Picture Arts and Sciences of Argentina.

After marrying Closas in 1950, they formed a theater company and dedicated themselves more frequently to theater performance. The premiere of "La estrella cayó en el mar", though marred by politics, was a success and continued playing to sold-out houses. After the first presentation, a reporter from the magazine El Hogar gave rave reviews on the play and marriage of Bence to Closas. The reporter was contacted by first lady Eva Peron, who also demanded that the editor print a retraction and a public denial of what had been written. Bence stated in her autobiography, that from that moment she was "black listed" by the regime, although she was apolitical. In July, after the play reached 150 performances at the Odéon Theatre, the cast began a tour that started in the Coliseo Podestá of La Plata, where they played to sold-out houses for ten days. As they continued with the tour, Bence and Closas worked on the play "Mi marido y su complejo", which they opened for the first time in Rosario and then took it to Buenos Aires, Rio Cuarto, Mendoza, San Juan and Córdoba. The tour was cut short by the production of Mi mujer está loca (1952), an adaptation of the play "Florence est folle". The screenplay was written by Carlos Schlieper and Ariel Cortazzo and starred both Bence and Closas.

=== Mid-century ===
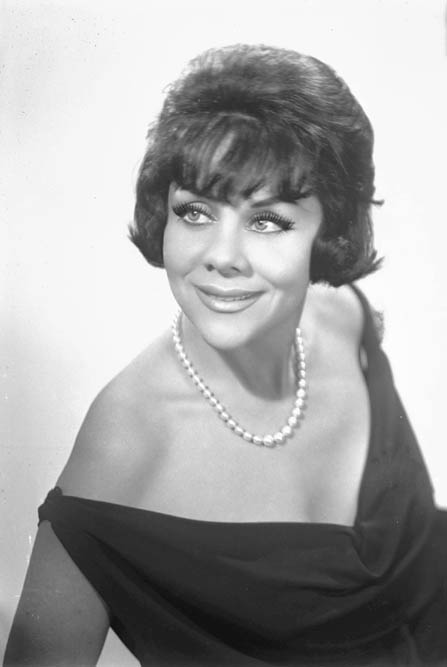
Amelia Bence in 1960

Contracted to work for Reforma Films in Mexico, Bence's first Mexican film was Siete Mujeres (1953). She recalled that the filming was completely different than anything she had worked on before, as there was no possibility of retakes or selective editing to provide the best footage for the film. Siete mujeres, like Las tres Elenas (1954), was never released in Argentina.

After ten months, Bence returned to Argentina and ended her marriage to Closas. She attended the first Mar del Plata International Film Festival in 1954, and then went with Mario Soffici and his production team to La Rioja, Spain to film El hombre que debía una muerte with Carlos Cores.

The play "Pesadilla" premiered in 1955 and involved a tour of Uruguay, Cordoba, Mendoza, Buenos Aires and Rosario, where they remained playing to a full house for two weeks. In the play, Bence played the character "Mary" and her performance received high praise in La Capital. Encouraged by Cecilio Madanes, she also opened "La dama del trébol", a play that had been successful in Paris. However, soon after its premiere, the Revolución Libertadora or the 1955 coup d'état that overthrew Juan Domingo Perón, occurred. Bence's new partner, José María Fernández Unsáin, had served as Eva Perón's secretary and as Chairman of the Committee on Culture, director of the Teatro Nacional Cervantes, and director general of the Ministry of Culture, under the Perón regime. Fernández's past led to threats at the theaters and demonstrations outside Bence's hotel, which in turn led to cancellations by the Theater of the Chilean Society of Authors for "Pesadilla", "La dama del trébol", "Eran tres" ... and "la noche". They also suspended the series "Mis protagonistas" which Bence was performing on Radio Minería with Luis Prendes. In 1956, she filmed Dos basuras under director Kurt Land, based on the play "Pesadilla", in which she portrayed a prostitute. It was not released until 1958 during the government of Arturo Frondizi.

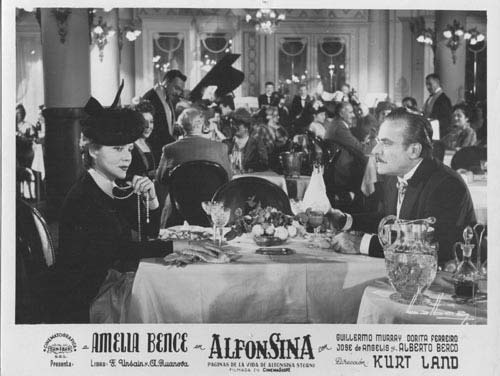
Amelia Bence and Guillermo Murray in Alfonsina (1957)

In 1957, she opened the play Testigo para la horca at the Ateneo Theater and began filming her favorite film: Alfonsina (1957) by Kurt Land, based on the life of poet Alfonsina Storni. Despite makeup tests, Bence decided to recreate it bare-faced, without any alterations, depending only on her acting abilities. She won the award for Best Actress from the Argentina Film Academy and the film was chosen as the Argentine entry for the 1957 Berlin International Film Festival.

Foreign press reviews praised her "interpretative restraint" and compared Bence to Austrian actress Paula Wessely. In the same year she had her first appearance on television playing in Teatro del sábado on Canal 7, in an episode which recreated Testigo para la horca based on the play by Agatha Christie. In 1957, Bence became one of the pioneers of the café cantante after the basement of the Santa Fe Galleries was remodeled to turn it into a theater. The presentation of the play "Asamblea de mujeres", based on a piece by Aristophanes, generated a variety of controversial criticism.

Bence's meeting in Europe with director José María Forqué led to her being cast in De espaldas a la puerta (1959), a crime drama which premiered at the Coliseum in Madrid, shortly before Bence returned to Buenos Aires. She won the Quixote prize for Best Foreign Actress for the role. Returning to Argentina, Bence was persuaded by Cecilio Madanes to perform in "Así es la vida" with the company of Luis Arata and Eva Franco. The newspaper La Prensa gave her good reviews and that led to its being brought by Canal 7 to television on the insistence of Mariano Perla. Simultaneously with her performance for Madanes, she opened the play Maribel y la extraña familia in the Odeón Theater, whose success led to performances in other cities such as Mar del Plata. The box office grossed 2 million pesos in the third month and 400,000 in the fourth.

=== Working abroad ===
In 1962, Bence joined an entourage including César Tiempo, Máximo Berrondo, and Enrique Serrano and appeared at the International Film Festival of India, where she met Prime Minister Jawaharlal Nehru at an official reception for foreign artists. Back in Argentina, she accepted an offer to star in the Uruguayan television production of Maribel y la extraña familia and on Canal 9 in Buenos Aires, a production of Nuestra Natacha. Under the direction of Daniel Tinayre, she participated in the low-budget film La cigarra no es un bicho, intended to revive the national film industry. The film featured performances by Homero Cárpena, Bárbara Mujica and Luis Sandrini and others. In the first week, viewings exceeded 3,000 spectators per day and the film spent seven weeks at the Cine Opera and eleven at the Trocadero Theater. In the film, Bence played a prostitute and La Nación reported that she and Luis Sandrini's performances shone. Shortly after, both were honored as the best Argentine artists of the year by Chilean journalists.

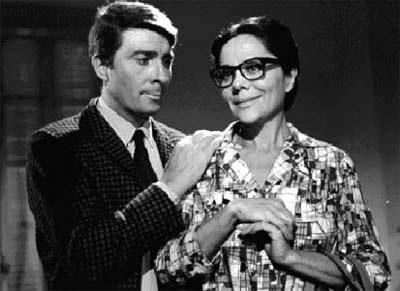
Antonio Prieto and Amelia Bence in La industria del matrimonio (1965)

From October to December 1963, she made a tour of Tucumán, Bahía Blanca, Córdoba, Mendoza, Rosario and Montevideo. By June 1964, she had started a theatrical season in Chile with "Los millones de Orofino", to critical acclaim. Directed by Enrique Carreras, Luis Saslavsky and Fernando Ayala, she starred with Tita Merello and Ángel Magaña in La industria del matrimonio, a film shot in episodes, where she played a wealthy spinster. Bence next received an offer to star in "El proceso de Mary Duggan" under the direction of Tinayre; however, she rejected the offer and was replaced by Malvina Pastorino. In the second season Pastorino quit the production and Bence finished the run. The actor Francisco Petrone, a member of the cast, died of cancer during the season. In 1968, as part of the cast of Comedy of the province of Buenos Aires, she debuted in La Plata and simultaneously, in Mar del Plata in the George Bernard Shaw classic, "Cándida", directed by Milagros de la Vega.

At the end of 1968, Bence decided to undertake a six-month tour for the following year through Santiago, Bogotá, Cali, Medellín and Manizales. From Colombia, she went to Venezuela and debuted at the Municipal Theater of Caracas with four works: "Cándida", "Un inocente adulterio", "Un dios durmió en casa" and "Los amantes". Then she went on tour through the Dominican Republic, Puerto Rico and Miami, where she earned good reviews. When she returned from this long tour, she took a hiatus for several months and then agreed to do "Flor de cactus" with Juan Carlos Thorry at the Comedy Theater in Rosario. After its opening run, the project continued on tour through the countryside, in Paraná, Cordoba, Santa Fe and Tucumán.

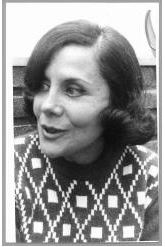
Amelia Bence, 1975

In mid-1972, she was invited by the Spanish Repertory Theater Company in New York to participate in a theater season at the Gramercy Arts Theater with "La valija" (The Suitcase). Upon its release, The New York Post wrote: "Play with a hopeless character goes to the heart". Bence performed on tour at Rosary College Theater at the University of Connecticut, Boston, Chicago and at the headquarters of the Organization of American States in Washington, DC, where her audience was 1,200 spectators. When she performed through Florida and in Miami, Howard Thompson of The New York Times, titled his article, "Spanish Impact on Off Broadway" and continued, "Amelia Bence, an artist of strong mercurial quality and wonderfully expressive eyes, illuminates the scene and work ... She makes the role come alive, with eyes that tell the story of a tender woman, slightly naive and carefree. For her work, she won the Association of Latin Entertainment Critics (ACE) award for Best Foreign Actress during a dinner held at the Commodore Hotel in New York. Back in Argentina, she did "La valija" with Justo José Rojas and Aldo Cura in Santiago del Estero, Salta, Jujuy and Córdoba, touring for four months. In 1973, she made her first color film, Adiós, Alejandra, after nearly four decades of making movies. Upon returning to the United States in September 1975, she opened "Doña Rosita, la soltera" by Federico Garcia Lorca and personally met four-time Oscar-winning actress, Katharine Hepburn. At the request of the director, she took the show to Miami in September 1976 and stayed until early 1977, when she went to Peru to open "La esposa constante" at the Marsano Theater.

In the early 1980s, Bence participated frequently on television, part of the main casts of Dulce fugitiva, Romina, Bianca and Las 24 horas. "La loba", which she performed in 1982 in Peru was one of her most famous theatrical successes and also aired on Peruvian television, under the same name coordinated by her former partner Osvaldo Cattone. In 1985, she starred in a Peruvian soap opera entitled La casa de enfrente, which increased her popularity and the audiences of "La loba".

=== Later career ===
Bence's career began to decline around 1986, and she stopped receiving work proposals. The Argentina Actors Association said at the time that 86% of their members were unemployed; however, she was hired for one of the two lead roles in the 1987 production of "Solo 80". The play, by Colin Higgins was presented at the Blanca Podestá Theater on Corrientes Avenue, with Bence playing the character of Harold's mother. The play received good reviews, but failed to attract an audience, and ended in February 1988. Bence spent almost two years out of work and in 1989 traveled to Cuba to attend the International Festival of New Latin American Cinema, where she met Fidel Castro at a reception. Later that year, she was honored with the Silver Condor Award for Lifetime Achievement at the same ceremony where Sabina Olmos was honored. In 1992, she also won the Pablo Podestá Prize for Lifetime achievement, along with Niní Marshall and Margarita Padín.

In 1990, Bence was reunited with Closas to act in "Cartas de amor". She then embarked on the longest road tour of her life and spent the next 21 months (until November 1992) touring "Esta noche hablamos de amor" in Buenos Aires, Rosario, Córdoba, Mendoza and Mar del Plata. In 1993, she worked in television on a telenovela Esos que dicen amarse, which starred Carolina Papaleo and Raúl Taibo. She had a supporting role in the series Con alma de tango (1995) alongside Luisa Kuliok and Gerardo Romano, which had an international run throughout Latin America and in some European countries such as Italy, Israel and Turkey.

In 1998, Bence and Libertad Lamarque received a Golden Ángel "Cholo" Peco award from the Society of Distributors of Newspapers and Magazines. She was part of the cast of the Teatro de la Ribera in 1998, playing in "Hoy ensayo Hoy", which brought together veteran actors Elena Lucena and María Aurelia Bisutti.

After participating in "Sin condena" and "Alta comedia" in the mid-1990s, she was hired in 1999 to do a play at the XIV International Festival of Hispanic Theater, but due to technical problems it was canceled. She persuaded Osvaldo Cattone to direct the play "Venecia", in which she starred in 2002 in Lima. In 2003, Bence ventured into children's theater with the work "Amor invisible" with Gustavo Monje. The play combined magic, dance, music and theater, recreating a fairyland. She returned to television in 2004 joining Pablo Granados and Pachu Peña in the comic series No hay dos sin tres, for which she was nominated in 2005 for the category of "Special Participation in Fiction" for the Martín Fierro Awards.

In recent years, Bence has received many awards acknowledging her long career. In 2006, she was honored by the Actors Social Work (OSA) and in 2007, she received the inaugural Javolandia Award for lifetime achievement from the Javo Rocha Academy of Theater. She was given a certificate of recognition during the María Guerrero Awards ceremony in 2007 and in 2008 she received the Trinidad Guevara Achievement Award with Jorge Rivera López. In late 2009, a tribute in her honor was held by the Northern Region of the Argentine Society of Writers, in which the Mayor of San Isidro presented a poetry anthology and designated the hall with Bence's name.

For 14 years, before a fall which caused a hip fracture, Bence put on her one-man-show, "Alfonsina". In April 2010 she fell and underwent surgery. In June 2011, Bence was declared Outstanding Personality of Argentine Culture under an initiative of Deputy Juan Pablo Arenaza. Soon after, with the help of Raul Etchelet, she published her memoirs, La niña del umbral: Amelia Bence: memorias (Corregidor 2011). In 2012, El día que cambió la historia, a documentary filmed in 2010, was released. It was her first film in 40 years and was a film about the labor movement under the Perón regime.

== Personal life ==
Her first partner was Roberto Fernández Beyró, with whom she had a relationship from 1941 to 1944: The relationship ended when Fernandez Beyró asked her to give up her career. Two years later, during the filming of Maria Rosa (1946), she met the Spanish actor Alberto Closas, whom she married in 1950. They formed an artistic partnership as well as being a married couple and worked on films and plays together. In 1953, Bence returned from working abroad to discover Closas was having an affair, and decided to end the marriage. Bence maintained a good relationship with Closas for the rest of his life; they even worked together again and she mourned his death in 1994.

In the mid-1950s she had a brief romance with the writer José María Fernández Unsáin, until his exile to Mexico in 1958. From 1964 to 1970, she remained in a relationship with Osvaldo Cattone, who was 19 years her junior. He directed her in "Doña Rosita, la soltera" and she worked with him in Peru on several occasions. Her last husband was "Charlie" Ortiz Basualdo, whom she lived with from 1980 to 1982. Up until suffering a serious hip fracture she exercised regularly, performing yoga, and maintained a very active life combined with a healthy diet.

== Death ==
Bence died on 8 February 2016 in Buenos Aires at the age of 101.

== Legacy ==
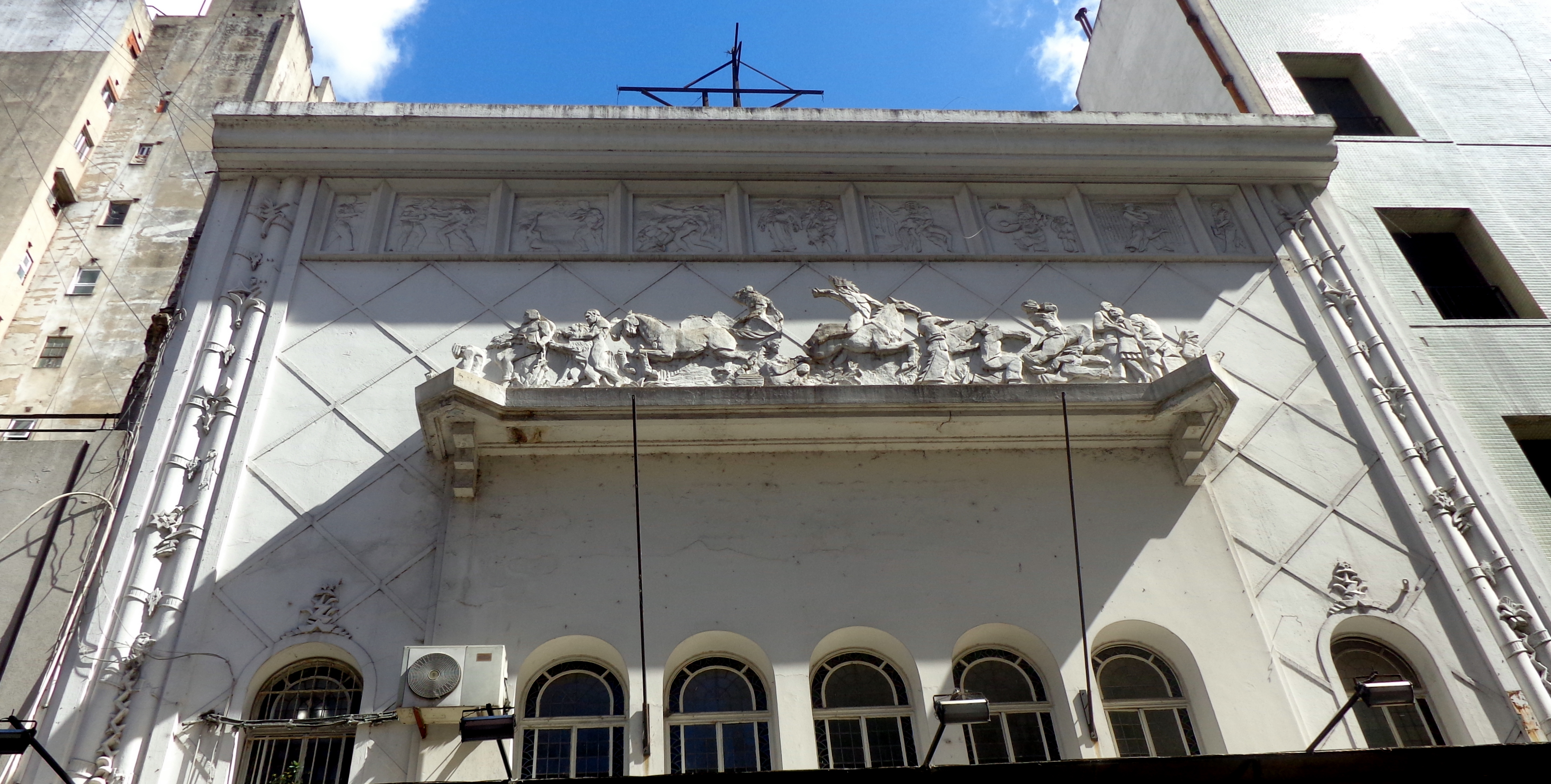
A room at the Tita Merello Complex has been named after Amelia Bence

Bence has left a film legacy stretching through eight decades. In 1973, she was awarded the keys to the city of Miami during her season of "La valija". In 1981, the Pablo C. Ducrós Hicken Museum of the Cinema designated the Pathé Chamber to her in recognition of her stature as "a first figure of national cinema". In 1995, the Senate of the Nation of Argentina awarded a cultural diploma for her contributions to the culture of Argentina and two years later, the National Endowment for the Arts granted her a lifetime achievement award. She was also made an honorary member of the Academy of Motion Picture Arts and Sciences of Argentina in 2007.

During her career, she was described as "the face of Argentine film", and through the years, many hailed her as having "the most beautiful eyes in the world." Bence liked to tell a story that Paul Newman once recounted that he wore sunglasses to hide his eyes so he would be known for his acting. She agreed that the work was the more important legacy. In November 2010, the journalist Daniel Gómez Rinaldi published a book entitled Amelia Bence: Los ojos más lindos del mundo, a biography of the actress.

I think I caught my dream. I wanted to be an actress and I was. And this dream will never end ... I am of a generation of actresses and actors who made themselves in an adventure of cinema and theater, that dreamt and created poets, madmen and bohemians.

— Amelia Bence,

== Autobiography ==
- Bence, Amelia; Etchelet, Raúl. La niña del umbral: Amelia Bence: memorias Buenos Aires, Argentina: Corregidor (2011) (in Spanish)

== Filmography ==
=== Films ===
- Dancing (1933)
- La fuga (1937)
- El forastero (1937)
- Adiós Buenos Aires (1938)
- La vuelta al nido (1938)
- Los caranchos de la Florida (1938)
- Hermanos (1939)
- El matrero (1939)
- El haragán de la familia (1940)
- Novios para las muchachas (1941)
- La casa de los cuervos (1941)
- El tercer beso (1942)
- En el viejo Buenos Aires (1942)
- Cruza (1942)
- La guerra gaucha (1942)
- Son cartas de amor (1943)
- Los ojos más lindos del mundo (1943)
- Todo un hombre (1943)
- Nuestra Natacha (1944)
- Veinticuatro horas en la vida de una mujer (1944)
- Camino del infierno (1945)
- Las tres ratas (1946)
- María Rosa (1946)
- Lauracha (1946)
- El pecado de Julia (1948)
- A sangre fría (1947)
- La otra y yo (1949)
- La danza del fuego (1949)
- La dama del collar (1949)
- Romance en tres noches (1950)
- Mi mujer está loca (1952)
- La Parda Flora (1952)
- Siete Mujeres (1953)
- Las tres Elenas (1954)
- El hombre que debía una muerte (1955)
- Alfonsina (1957)
- Dos basuras (1958)
- De espaldas a la puerta (1959)
- La cigarra no es un bicho (1963)
- La industria del matrimonio (1964)
- Los debutantes en el amor (1969)
- Adiós, Alejandra (1973)
- El día que cambió la historia (2012) (documentary)

=== Television ===
- Los premios Nobel (1958) (mini-series)
- Topaze (1960) (mini-series)
- Espectáculo eléctrico estándar (1965) (mini-series)
- Dulce fugitiva (1979)
- Bianca (1980)
- Romina (1980)
- Las 24 horas (1981)
- Esos que dicen amarse (1993)
- Son o se hacen (1997)
- No hay 2 sin 3 (2004)

== See also ==
- List of centenarians (actors, filmmakers and entertainers)
