= List of Argentine films of 1942 =

A list of films produced in Argentina in 1942:

Argentine films of 1942
Title	Director	Release	Genre
A - C
Academia "El Tango Argentino"	Julio Irigoyen		
Adolescencia	Francisco Mugica	11 March	
Amor último modelo	Roberto Ratti	16 December	
Así te quiero	Edmo Cominetti	18 February	
Bajó un ángel del cielo	Luis César Amadori	11 August	
Bruma en el Riachuelo	Carlos Schlieper	11 May	
Cada hogar, un mundo	Carlos Borcosque	27 April	
El Camino de las llamas	Mario Soffici	8 April	
La casa de los millones	Luis Bayón Herrera	18 November	
Ceniza al viento	Luis Saslavsky	30 September	
Los chicos crecen	Carlos Hugo Christensen	29 July	
Claro de luna	Luis César Amadori	23 October	
El Comisario de Tranco Largo	Leopoldo Torres Ríos	21 October	
Concierto de almas	Alberto de Zavalía	25 May	
Cruza	Luis José Moglia Barth		
D - G
Elvira Fernández, vendedora de tiendas	Manuel Romero	1 July	
En el último piso	Catrano Catrani	7 April	
En el viejo Buenos Aires	Antonio Momplet	2 June	
Fantasmas en Buenos Aires	Enrique Santos Discépolo	8 July	
¡Gaucho!	Leopoldo Torres Ríos	9 June	
Gran pensión La Alegría	Julio Irigoyen	19 August	
El gran secreto	Jacques Remy	21 July	
La Guerra Gaucha	Lucas Demare	20 November	History
H - M
Historia de crímenes	Manuel Romero	9 November	Drama
Incertidumbre	Carlos Borcosque	23 September	
Locos de verano	Antonio Cunill Cabanellas and Carlos Hugo Christensen	25 February	
La luna en el pozo	Carlos Torres Ríos	2 December	
La maestrita de los obreros	Alberto de Zavalía	4 March	
Malambo	Alberto de Zavalía	20 October	
Mañana me suicido	Carlos Schlieper	16 September	Comedy
Mar del Plata ida y vuelta	Santiago Salviche and Lorenzo Serrano	28 October	
Melodías de América	Eduardo Morera	21 January	Musical
La mentirosa	Luis César Amadori	12 June	
Mi cielo de Andalucía	Ricardo Urgoiti	19 May	
N - P
Noche de bodas	Carlos Hugo Christensen	31 March	
La novela de un joven pobre	Luis Bayón Herrera	13 April	
La novia de primavera	Carlos Hugo Christensen	9 December	
La novia de los forasteros	Antonio Ber Ciani	23 October	Drama
El pijama de Adán	Francisco Mugica	23 June	
Ponchos azules	Luis Moglia Barth	2 December	
El profesor Cero	Luis César Amadori	4 February	
Puertos de ensueño	Cándido Moneo Sanz	14 July	
Q - Z
Secuestro sensacional!!!	Luis Bayón Herrera	14 July	
Sendas cruzadas	Luis A. Morales and Belisario García Villar	5 August	
Sinfonía argentina	Jacques Constant	5 November	
Su primer baile	Ernesto Arancibia	17 June	
El tercer beso	Luis César Amadori	17 March	
Tú eres la paz	Gregorio Martínez Sierra	14 August	
Una luz en la ventana	Manuel Romero	12 May	Horror
Una novia en apuros	John Reinhardt	10 March	
Un nuevo amanecer	Carlos Borcosque	25 November	
Upa en apuros	Tito Davison	20 November	
Vacaciones en el otro mundo	Mario Soffici	19 May	
Ven... mi corazón te llama	Manuel Romero	9 September	
El viaje	Francisco Mugica	14 October	
Vidas marcadas	Daniel Tinayre	20 April	
El viejo Hucha	Lucas Demare	29 April	
Yo conocí a esa mujer	Carlos Borcosque	14 January	

== External links and references ==
- Argentine films of 1942 at the Internet Movie Database
