= Silver Condor Award for Best Actress =

Annual Argentine film award

The Silver Condor Award for Best Actress (Spanish: Premio Cóndor de Plata a la mejor actriz), given by the Argentine Film Critics Association, awards the best actress in Argentina each year:

Year	Actress	Film
2024	Laura Paredes	Trenque Lauquen
2023	Pilar Gamboa	30 noches con mi ex
2022	Érica Rivas	The Intruder
2021	Valeria Lois	Las siamesas
2020	Sofía Gala Castiglione; Érica Rivas	El cuidado de los otros Los sonámbulos
2019	Mercedes Morán	Familia sumergida
2018	Sofía Gala Castiglione	Alanis
2017	Natalia Oreiro; Érica Rivas	Gilda, no me arrepiento de este amor La luz incidente
2016	Dolores Fonzi	La patota
2015	Julieta Díaz	Refugiado
2014	Natalia Oreiro	Wakolda
2013	Natalia Oreiro	Infancia clandestina
2012	Beatriz Spelzini	El gato desaparece
2011	Julieta Zylberberg	La mirada invisible
2010	Soledad Villamil	El secreto de sus ojos
2009	María Onetto	La mujer sin cabeza
2008	Inés Efron	XXY
2007	Valeria Bertuccelli	Mientras tanto
2006	China Zorrilla	Elsa y Fred
2005	Susú Pecoraro	Roma
2004	Marina Glezer	El Polaquito
2003	Rita Cortese	Herencia
2002	Graciela Borges	La Ciénaga
2001	Ariadna Gil	Nueces para el amor
2000	Soledad Villamil	El mismo amor, la misma lluvia
1999	Íngrid Rubio	El faro
1998	Cecilia Roth	Martín (Hache)
1997	Norma Aleandro; Esther Goris	Sol de otoño Eva Perón
1996	Inés Estévez	La nave de los locos
1995	Verónica Oddo	Golpes a mi puerta
1994	Luisina Brando	De eso no se habla
1993	Cecilia Roth	Un lugar en el mundo
1992	Bárbara Mujica	Loraldía
1991	Noemí Frenkel	Últimas imágenes del naufragio
1990	Cipe Lincovsky	La amiga
1989	Chela Ruiz	Mamá querida
1988	Leonor Manso	Made in Argentina
1987	Ana María Picchio	Chechechela, una chica de barrio
1986	Norma Aleandro	La historia oficial
1985	Alicia Bruzzo	Pasajeros de una pesadilla
1983	Luisina Brando	Señora de nadie
1982	Eva Franco	De la misteriosa Buenos Aires
1981	Dora Baret	Mis días con Verónica
1974	Thelma Biral (drama actress); Mercedes Carreras (comedy actress)	Los siete locos Los padrinos
1973	Thelma Biral	La maffia
1972	Malvina Pastorino	La valija
1971	Julia von Grolman	Juan Lamaglia y señora
1970	Ana María Picchio	Breve cielo
1969	Deserted	
1968	Elsa Daniel	El romance del Aniceto y la Francisca
1967	Evangelina Salazar	Del brazo y por la calle
1966	María Cristina Laurenz	Pajarito Gómez
1965	Virginia Lago	La sentencia
1964	Susana Freyre	Paula cautiva
1963	María Vaner	Los jóvenes viejos
1962	María Vaner	Tres veces Ana
1961	Lydia Lamaison	Un Guapo del '900
1960	Aída Luz	Aquello que amamos
1959	Susana Campos	Rosaura a las diez
1957	Delia Garcés	Alejandra
1955	Olga Zubarry	Marianela
1955	Tita Merello	Guacho
1953	Olga Zubarry	El vampiro negro
1952	Tita Merello	Los Isleros
1951	Tita Merello	Arrabalera
1950	Amelia Bence	Danza del fuego
1949	Sabina Olmos	Tierra del Fuego
1948	Amelia Bence	A sangre fría
1947	Amelia Bence	Lauracha
1946	Mecha Ortiz	Swan Song
1945	Mirtha Legrand	La pequeña señora de Pérez
1944	Mecha Ortiz	Safo, historia de una pasión
1943	Amelia Bence	El tercer beso
