= List of Argentine films of 1946 =

A list of films produced in Argentina in 1946:

Argentine films of 1946
| Title | Director | Release | Genre |
A - C
| Adán y la serpiente | Carlos Hugo Christensen | 9 May | comedy |
| Adiós pampa mía | Manuel Romero | 27 December | Musical |
| Albergue de mujeres | Arturo S. Mom | 16 August | drama |
| El ángel desnudo | Carlos Hugo Christensen | 14 November | drama |
| Camino del infierno | Luis Saslavsky | 15 March | |
| El Capitán Pérez | Enrique Cahen Salaberry | 7 February | |
| Celos | Mario Soffici | 23 August | |
| Cinco besos | Luis Saslavsky | 8 March | |
| Como tú ninguna | Roberto Ratti | | |
| Criminales de guerra | Júpiter Perruzi | 3 January | |
| Cristina | Francisco Mugica | 18 January | |
D - L
| Deshojando margaritas | Francisco Mugica | 19 June | |
| El diablo andaba en los choclos | Manuel Romero | 17 May | |
| Donde mueren las palabras | Hugo Fregonese | 25 April | |
| El Gran amor de Bécquer | Alberto de Zavalía | 8 October | |
| La Honra de los hombres | Carlos Schlieper | 12 April | |
| Inspiración | Jorge Jantus | 26 September | |
| Lauracha | Arturo García Buhr, Ernesto Arancibia, Antonio Ber Ciani and Enrique Cahen Salaberry | 11 October | |
M - Z
| La maja de los cantares | Benito Perojo | 5 July | |
| María Rosa | Luis José Moglia Barth | 15 August | |
| Milagro de amor | Francisco Mugica | 12 December | |
| Mosquita muerta | Luis César Amadori | 23 April | |
| No salgas esta noche | Arturo García Buhr | 25 January | |
| Rosa de América | Alberto de Zavalía | 16 May | |
| Soy un infeliz | Boris H. Hardy | 27 September | |
| El tercer huésped | Eduardo Boneo | 3 July | |
| The Three Musketeers | Julio Saraceni | 9 August | Adventure |
| La tía de Carlos | Leopoldo Torres Ríos | 16 August | comedy |
| Tres millones... y el amor | Luis Bayón Herrera | 31 October | |
| Las tres ratas | Carlos Schlieper | 7 August | |
| Un beso en la nuca | Luis Mottura | 18 July | |
| Un modelo de París | Luis Bayón Herrera | 21 June | |
| Viaje sin regreso | Pierre Chenal | 1 February | |

== External links and references ==
- Argentine films of 1946 at the Internet Movie Database
