= 1943 Argentine Film Critics Association Awards =

Argentine film awards ceremony in 1943

The 1943 Argentine Film Critics Association Awards ceremony was held in Buenos Aires on 10 January 1943 to honour the best films and contributors to Argentine cinema in 1942. This was the first time the awards had been presented.

== Awards given ==
- Best Film (Mejor Película): The Gaucho War (La guerra gaucha)
- Best Director (Mejor Director): Lucas Demare for The Gaucho War
- Best Actor (Mejor Actor): Arturo García Buhr for The Kids Grow Up (Los chicos crecen)
- Best Actress (Mejor Actriz): Amelia Bence for The Third Kiss (El tercer beso)
- Best Original Screenplay (Mejor Guión Original): Hugo Mac Dougall for Malambo
- Best Adapted Screenplay (Mejor Guión Adaptado): Ulises Petit de Murat and Homero Manzi for The Gaucho War
- Best Foreign Film (Mejor Película Extranjera): John Ford's How Green Was My Valley (1941)
- Special Prize (Premio especial): Dante Quinterno for his short animated colour film Upa en apuros
