= List of Argentine films of 1943 =

A list of films produced in Argentina in 1943:

Argentine films of 1943
Title	Director	Release	Genre
A - C
La calle Corrientes	Manuel Romero	14 July	comedy
Cándida, la mujer del año	Enrique Santos Discépolo	23 February	comedy
Capitán Veneno	Henri Martinent	31 March	comedy
Carmen	Luis César Amadori	26 October	Drama
Casa de muñecas	Ernesto Arancibia	21 September	Drama
Casi un sueño	Tito Davison	21 April	
Cuando florezca el naranjo	Alberto de Zavalía	1 April	
D - H
Dieciséis años	Carlos Hugo Christensen	12 May	Drama
Eclipse de sol	Luis Saslavsky	1 July	
El espejo	Francisco Mugica	16 June	
El fabricante de estrellas	Manuel Romero	18 March	
Frontera Sur	Belisario García Villar	20 January	
Fuego en la montaña	Carlos Torres Ríos	25 November	
La guerra la gano yo	Francisco Mugica	14 December	
Los hijos artificiales	Antonio Momplet	9 June	Drama
Los hombres las prefieren viudas	Gregorio Martínez Sierra	21 July	
I - P
Juvenilia	Augusto César Vatteone	31 May	
La juventud manda	Carlos Borcosque	17 June	
Luisito	Luis César Amadori	24 May	
The Minister's Daughter	Francisco Mugica	3 February	
Los ojos más lindos del mundo	Luis Saslavsky	27 July	
Oro en la mano	Adelqui Millar	2 December	
Pasión imposible	Luis Bayón Herrera	17 March	
La piel de zapa	Luis Bayón Herrera	28 October	
Punto negro	Luis Mottura	24 September	
Q - Z
Rosas de otoño	Juan de Orduña		
Safo, historia de una pasión	Carlos Hugo Christensen	17 September	
El sillón y la gran duquesa	Carlos Schlieper	28 July	
Son cartas de amor	Luis César Amadori	26 March	
Las sorpresas del divorcio	Roberto Ratti	17 November	
Stella	Benito Perojo	8 October	
La suerte llama tres veces	Luis Bayón Herrera	23 June	
Su hermana menor	Enrique Cahen Salaberry	30 April	
Todo un hombre	Pierre Chenal	16 August	
Tres hombres del río	Mario Soffici	22 April	
Un atardecer de amor	Rogelio Geissmann	7 October	
Valle negro	Carlos Borcosque	10 September	

== External links and references ==
- Argentine films of 1943 at the Internet Movie Database
