= Escala en la ciudad =

- Screenshot
- Directed by: Alberto De Zavalia
- Written by: Alberto De Zavalia; Carlos Aden
- Produced by: Alberto De Zavalia
- Starring: Eduardo Berri
- Cinematography: John Alton
- Release date: 1935
- Running time: 70 minutes
- Country: Argentina
- Language: Spanish

Escala en la ciudad (A stop in the city) is a 1935 Argentine film directed and written by Alberto De Zavalia with Carlos Aden. It was produced by SIFAL, a production company run by de Zavalia and his partner Luis Saslavsky, during the Golden Age of Argentine cinema. The production company disbanded the following year, after de Zavalia had made Escala en la ciudad, his feature film debut, and Saslavsky had completed his second and most famous movie, Crimen a las tres.

== Plot ==
The story follows Jaime Lara, a passenger whose ship makes a stop in Buenos Aires for one day. Lara elopes, leaving his wife on board, and walks around the city at night, coming to meet a beautiful yet frivolous hooker, Isa. Jaime and Isa go to a bar, and later on to her house, but Jaime would rather talk to her than anything else. Meanwhile, the captain of another ship, Cristian, is looking for Isa "to settle a score". Drunk, he meets Isa's neighbor and fellow prostitute, Tita, who falls for him.

Jaime and Isa walk around the city and make a stop in a clothes' shop. They have a chance encounter with a group of actors who are short of two people for rehearsal. When they see Isa try a gown, they immediately approach them and ask them to join them in the show. They're introduced to their ringleader, the pompous Pamela, who hosts a rehearsal for a few selected critics. Jaime and Isa perform marvelously, despite the fact they read from the script while acting. Pamela congratulates them and has them driven away to a n expensive hotel.

Isa refuses to have sex with Jaime, and the following day they take a stroll on a riverside park. Isa, unaware that Jaime has a wife waiting for him on the ship, questions him about his uneasiness, but he dismisses her questions. He promises that he will never leave her, and that they will both move to the countryside. For once, Isa is happy. They return to her home, where Jaime is distracted by the bellowing of the ship. Tita comes up and asks Isa down to her apartment.

Cristian confronts Isa in Tita's place. He tells her that he has changed, and asks her to come back to him. Isa, however, refuses, and goes back upstairs to find that Jaime has abandoned her and gone back to the parting ship. Tita, having heard Cristian's proposal to Isa, shoots herself dead with Cristian's revolver. A steward walks in and takes Cristian away back to his ship. The final scene shows Isa back in her usual spot, waiting to prostitute herself. As the screen fades to black, an embittered Isa remembers Jaime's promises of love and devotion.

== Main cast ==
- Eduardo Berri
- Matilde Bhor
- Héctor Cataruzza
- Cecilia Lezard
- Matilde Mur
- Esther Vani
