= Silver Condor Award for Best Actor =

Annual Argentine film award

The Silver Condor Award for Best Actor (Spanish: Premio Cóndor de Plata a la mejor actor), given by the Argentine Film Critics Association, awards the best actor in Argentina each year:

Year	Actor	Film
2025	Nahuel Pérez Biscayart; Marcelo Subiotto	El Jockey; Puan
2023	Ricardo Darín	Argentina, 1985
2022	Leonardo Sbaraglia	Errante corazón
2021	Esteban Meloni Diego Velázquez	La chancha The Master
2020	Javier Drolas	Las buenas intenciones
2019	Darío Grandinetti	Rojo
2018	Jorge Marrale; Leonardo Sbaraglia	Maracaibo; El otro hermano
2017	Oscar Martínez	El ciudadano ilustre
2016	Joaquín Furriel	El patrón: radiografía de un crimen
2015	Osmar Núñez	La corporación
2014	Guillermo Pfening	Wakolda
2013	Alejandro Awada	Días de pesca
2012	Luis Luque	El gato desaparece
2011	Daniel Aráoz	El hombre de al lado
2010	Ricardo Darín	El secreto de sus ojos
2009	Jorge Marrale; Oscar Martínez	Cordero de Dios; El nido vacío
2008	Julio Chávez	El otro
2007	Julio Chávez	El custodio
2006	Ricardo Darín	El aura
2005	Rodrigo de la Serna	The Motorcycle Diaries
2004	Tato Pavlovsky	Potestad
2003	Julio Chávez	Un oso rojo
2002	Ricardo Darín	El hijo de la novia
2001	Ricardo Darín	Nueve reinas
2000	Ricardo Darín; Ulises Dumont	El mismo amor, la misma lluvia Yepeto
1999	Darío Grandinetti; Jorge Marrale	Sus ojos se cerraron Cómplices
1998	Federico Luppi	Martín (Hache)
1997	Federico Luppi	Sol de otoño
1996	Miguel Ángel Solá	Casas de fuego
1995	Luis Brandoni	Convivencia
1994	Edgardo Nieva	Gatica, el mono
1993	Federico Luppi	Un lugar en el mundo
1992	Patricio Contreras	La última siembra
1991	Víctor Laplace	Flop
1990	Héctor Malamud	Los Espíritus patrióticos
1989	Lorenzo Quinteros	Las Puertitas del señor López
1988	Lorenzo Quinteros	Hombre mirando al sudeste
1987	Luis Brandoni	Seré cualquier cosa pero te quiero
1986	Carlos Carella	El rigor del destino
1985	Miguel Ángel Solá	Asesinato en el Senado de la Nación
1983	Federico Luppi	Plata dulce
1982	Federico Luppi	Tiempo de revancha
1981	Alberto de Mendoza	El infierno tan temido
1974	Pepe Soriano (drama actor); Jorge Porcel (comedy actor)	Las venganzas de Beto Sánchez; Los Doctores las prefieren desnudas
1973	José Slavin	La maffia
1972	Luis Sandrini	La valija
1971	Pepe Soriano	Juan Lamaglia y señora
1970	Walter Vidarte	El dependiente
1969	Alfredo Alcón	Martín Fierro
1968	Federico Luppi	El romance del Aniceto y la Francisca
1967	Sergio Renán	Castigo al traidor
1966	Sergio Renán; Jorge Salcedo	El perseguidor Orden de matar
1965	Jorge Salcedo	Mujeres perdidas
1964	Alfredo Alcón	Los inocentes
1963	Lautaro Murúa	La cifra impar
1962	Alberto Argibay	Alias Gardelito
1961	Alfredo Alcón	Un Guapo del '900
1960	Lautaro Murúa	Aquello que amamos
1959	Alberto de Mendoza	El jefe
1957	Lautaro Murúa	Graciela
1956	António Vilar	La Quintrala
1955	Ángel Magaña	El cura Lorenzo
1954	Luis Sandrini	La casa grande
1953	Francisco Martínez Allende	Facundo, el tigre de los llanos
1952	Mario Soffici	El extraño caso del hombre y la bestia
1951	Santiago Gómez Cou	Arrabalera
1950	Narciso Ibáñez Menta	Almafuerte
1949	Arturo de Córdova	Dios se lo pague
1948	Pedro López Lagar	Albéniz
1947	Pedro López Lagar	Celos
1946	Narciso Ibáñez Menta	Cuando en el cielo pasen lista
1945	Enrique Muiño	Su mejor alumno
1944	Francisco Petrone	Todo un hombre
1943	Arturo García Buhr	Los chicos crecen
