= TEDxLima =

- Website type: Conference
- Available in: Spanish, multilingual subtitles, transcript
- Headquarters: Lima, {{{location_country}}}
- Area served: Lima
- Website: tedxlima.org
- Registration: Mandatory
- Launched: 2017 (first conference)
- Current status: Active

TEDxLima is an independent TEDx event held annually in Lima, Peru. Like other TEDx events, the event obtained a free license from TED to hold the conference, with organizers agreeing to follow certain principles.

== History ==
TEDxLima was founded as an independent TEDx event.

=== 2017 ===
- Carol Hernandez
- Ricardo Morán
- Luciana Olivares
- Indyra Oropeza
- Anai Padilla
- Wendy Ramos
- Moisés Salazar
- Sergio Tenorio
- Bruno Villegas

=== 2018 ===
- Marco Carrasco
- Osvaldo Cattone
- Andrea De la Piedra
- Natsumi Fukuhara
- Max Hidalgo
- Milagros López Loli
- Deyvis Orosco
- Enzo Romero
- César Zevallos

== See also ==
- Culture of Peru
