= La Vendedora de fantasías =

- Film poster for La Vendedora de fantasías
- Directed by: Daniel Tinayre, Orlando Zumpano
- Written by: Alejandro Verbitsky and Emilio Villalba Welsh
- Produced by: Edgardo Togni
- Starring: Mirtha Legrand and Alberto Closas
- Cinematography: Alberto Etchebehere
- Edited by: Jorge Gárate
- Music by: Víctor Slister
- Production company: Argentina Sono Film
- Release date: 1950
- Running time: 97 minutes
- Country: Argentina
- Language: Spanish

La Vendedora de fantasías (The Fantasy Saleswoman) is a 1950 Argentine crime comedy film directed by Daniel Tinayre during the classical era of Argentine cinema. It stars Mirtha Legrand and Alberto Closas.

== Plot ==
Marta (Legrand), a department store clerk, aids her police detective fiancé (Closas) in hunting down a gang of jewel thieves. She awakens to later realise that it was all a dream.

== Cast ==
- Mirtha Legrand as Martha
- Alberto Closas as Roberto / Aníbal Ferro, "Pulguita"
- Alberto Bello as Jaime
- Homero Cárpena as Lavanca / policeman
- Nathán Pinzón as El Cabezón
- Beba Bidart as Olga Bernard
- Francisco Charmiello as Pancho
- Diana de Córdoba as Woman in hotel
- Pilar Gómez as Catalina / mother of Alberto
- Haydée Larroca as Cholita
- Miguel Ligero as Garófalo
- Alberto Quiles as Mucamo
- Ramón J. Garay as concierge
- Alberto Barcel as chief of police
- Luis García Bosch as Borracho
- Manuel Alcón as jewelry buyer
- Carlos Belluci as Sereno
- Fernando Campos
- Carmen Llambí as telephonist
- Jesús Pampín as director of orchestra

== Reception ==
The critic King thought it was "good cinema and another opportunity to laugh" and Noticias Gráficas considered it a "funny, agile and very well filmed police farce". Film writers Raúl Manrupe and María Alejandra Portela write: "Successful at the time, today it can be seen as an exercise of formal and conceptual arbitrariness. Valued in part by the critics, it retains some effective moments."
