= Eclipse of the Sun (film) =

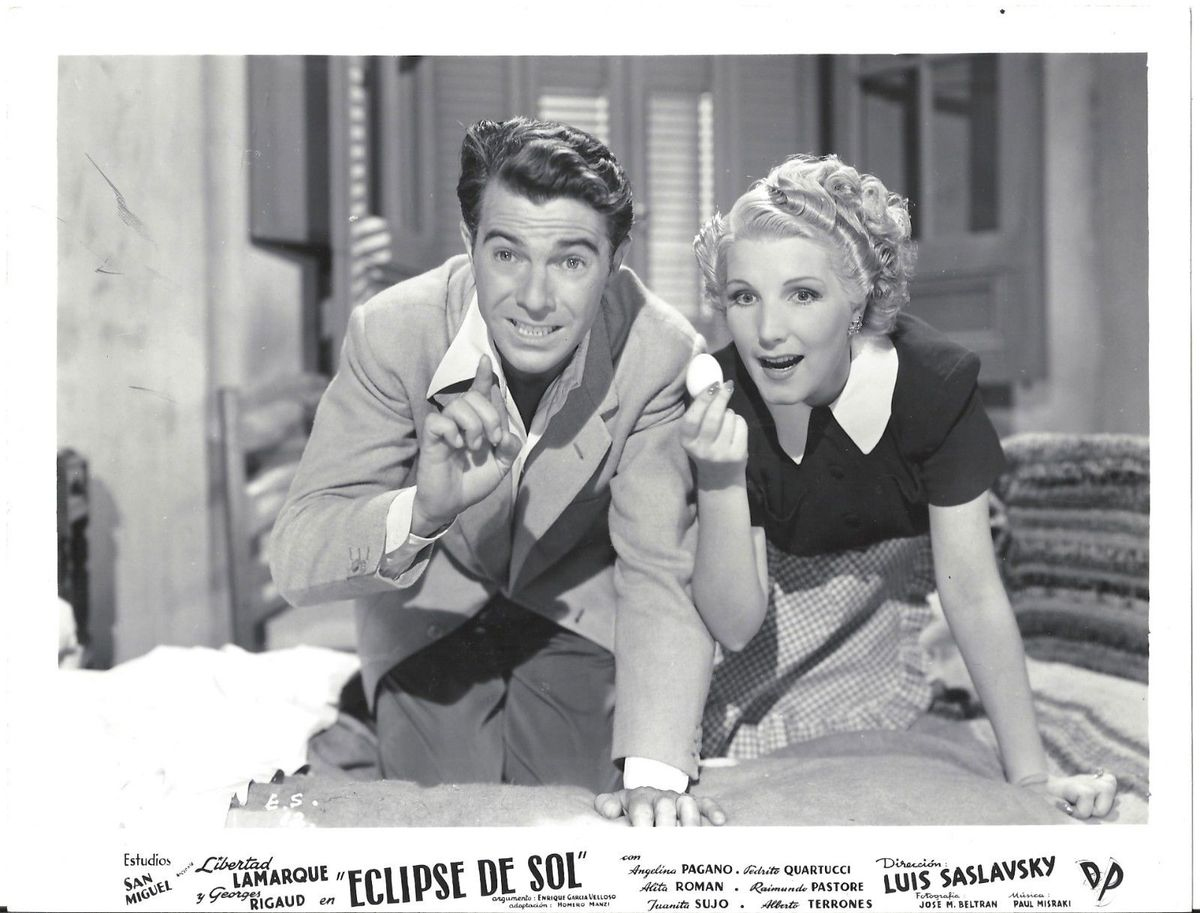
- Directed by: Luis Saslavsky
- Screenplay by: Enrique García Velloso, Homeo Manzi
- Starring: Libertad Lamarque; George Rigaud; Angelina Pagano
- Edited by: Kurt Land; Carlos Rinaldi
- Distributed by: Estudios San Miguel
- Release date: July 1, 1943 (Argentina)
- Running time: 84 minutes
- Country: Argentina
- Language: Spanish

Eclipse of the Sun (Spanish:Eclipse de sol) is a 1943 Argentine film of the classical era of Argentine cinema directed by Luis Saslavsky.

== Cast ==
- Libertad Lamarque
- George Rigaud
- Angelina Pagano
