= A Sangre Fría =

A sangre fría
- Directed by: Daniel Tinayre
- Written by: Luis Saslavsky
- Produced by: Juan J. Guthmann
- Starring: Tito Alonso; Lopez Lagar; Amelia Bence
- Cinematography: Alberto Etchebehere
- Edited by: Jorge Gárate
- Music by: Helena Cortesina
- Release date: 1947
- Running time: 95 minutes
- Country: Argentina
- Language: Spanish

A sangre fría (English language: In Cold Blood) is a 1947 Argentine crime film of the classical era of Argentine cinema, directed by Daniel Tinayre and written by Luis Saslavsky.

Amelia Bence portrays a vulnerable ageing aunt

== Cast ==
- Tito Alonso
- Amelia Bence
- Ricardo Castro Ríos
- Helena Cortesina .... Linda Moreno
- Floren Delbene
- Carmen Giménez .... Mujer en hotel
- Antonia Herrero
- Ángel Laborde .... Hombre en estación de servicio
- Marcelo Lavalle .... Transpunte
- Carmen Llambí .... Monja
- Mercedes Llambí .... Enfermera
- Pedro López Lagar
- Domingo Mania .... Sr. Dupont
- José Maurer .... Doctor
- Luis Otero .... Comisario Valdez
- Juan Pecci .... Farmacéutico
- Ilde Pirovano
- Elvira Quiroga
- Domingo Sapelli
- Nicolás Taricano .... José

== Release ==
Amelia Bence's evil nephew (Lopez Lagar) (left) attempts to murder her to inherit her fortune in this 1947 thriller from Argentina

The film was released on 5 September 1962.

The Argentine Academy of Cinematography Arts and Sciences gave the Best Actress award to Amelia Bence and the Best individual production award to Luis Saslavsky for this film.
