= La patota =

La patota may refer to:

- La patota (1960 film), 1960 film
- Paulina (film) (La patota), 2015 film
