= The Third Kiss (1942 film) =

- Directed by: Luis César Amadori
- Written by: Luis César Amadori
- Cinematography: Alberto Etchebehere
- Edited by: Jorge Gárate
- Music by: Mario Maurano
- Production company: Argentina Sono Film
- Release date: March 17, 1942 (Buenos Aires)
- Running time: 90 minutes
- Country: Argentina
- Language: Spanish

The Third Kiss (Spanish: El tercer beso) is a 1942 Argentine romantic drama film of the Golden Age of Argentine cinema, directed by Luis César Amadori (who also wrote the screenplay) and starring Pedro López Lagar, Silvia Legrand and Amelia Bence. At the 1943 Argentine Film Critics Association Awards, Amelia Bence won the Silver Condor Award for Best Actress for her performance in the film.

== Cast ==
- Pedro López Lagar
- Silvia Legrand
- Amelia Bence
- Francisco Álvarez
- Billy Days
- Domingo Márquez
- Gloria Bayardo
- Aurelia Ferrer
- Rosa Martín
- Arturo Bamio
