= Dulce fugitiva =

Dulce fugitiva is a 1980 Argentine telenovela. It stars Gerardo Romano and Silvina Rada.

== Cast ==
- Amelia Bence
- Mirta Busnelli
- Eloísa Cañizares
- Emilio Comte
- Claudio Corvalán
- Daniel Lago
- Marcela López Rey
- María Noel
- Cris Morena
- Silvina Rada
- Gerardo Romano
- Eduardo Rudy
- Jorge Villalba
