= Salvador Elizondo =

Mexican writer (1932–2006)

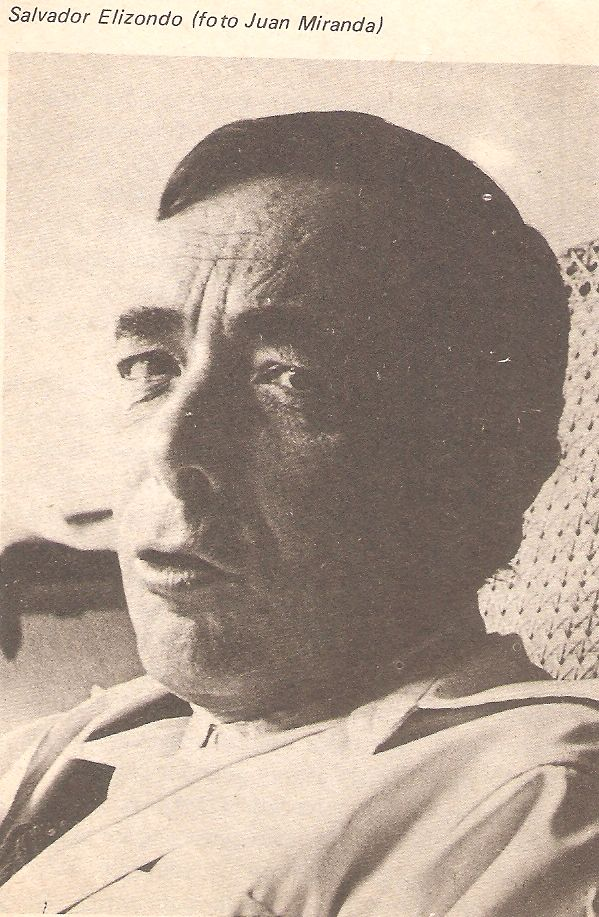
- Salvador Elizondo
- Born: December 19, 1932; Mexico City, Mexico
- Died: March 29, 2006 (aged 73); Mexico City, Mexico
- Occupation: Writer
- Writing career
- Notable awards: National Prize for Arts; Xavier Villaurrutia Award

Salvador Elizondo Alcalde (December 19, 1932, in Mexico City – March 29, 2006) was a Mexican writer of the 60s Generation of Mexican literature.

Regarded as one of the creators of the most influential cult noirè, experimental, intelligent style literature in Latin America, he wrote as a novelist, poet, critic, playwright, and journalist. His most famous novels are Farabeuf (1965) and El hipogeo Secreto (1968). He is also known for El grafógrafo (1972) which is a series of short texts based on linguistic abbreviatory experimentation. Farabeuf (tr. John Incledon) was published in English by Ox & Pigeon in 2015.

His style is considered innovative among Mexican contemporary literature for introducing a cosmopolitan view of language and narrative, bringing elements from external literary currents and languages to a refined dialogue of thought and communication. His technique is considered rather unrealistic and proto-fictional, as opposed to magical realism. Some critics have highlighted his literary works as postmodern literature since it challenges fiction through autofiction, metafiction, metalepsis, and by intertwining possible fictional worlds. His works are associated with writers such as Ezra Pound, James Joyce, Julio Cortázar, Juan Rulfo and Georges Bataille. He was also a professor at UNAM for 25 years (mentor of writers such as Pablo Soler Frost) and received many international grants, such as the Guggenheim and Rockefeller, and was the recipient of the 1990 national prize of literature.

Elizondo died in Mexico City on March 29, 2006, of cancer. His funeral was held at the Palacio de Bellas Artes.

== Works ==
- Poemas, 1960
- Luchino Visconti (críticism), 1963
- Farabeuf o la crónica de un instante (novel), 1965
- Narda o el verano, 1966
- Autobiografía, 1966
- El hipogeo secreto (novel) 1968
- Cuaderno de escritura (críticism), 1969
- El retrato de Zoe, 1969
- El grafógrafo, 1972
- Contextos (critical articles), 1973
- Museo poético (anthology of modern Mexican poetry), 1974
- Antología personal, 1974
- Miscast (A comedy in three Acts), 1981
- Camera lucida, México, 1983
- La luz que regresa, 1984
- Elsinore: un cuaderno, 1988
- Estanquillo (assorted texts), 1992
- Teoría del infierno, 1993
- Pasado Anterior 2007

== Selected filmography ==
- The Hypnotist (1940)
- Tender Pumpkins (1949)
- Philip of Jesus (1949)
- Duel in the Mountains (1950)
- Seven Women (1953)
- The Three Elenas (1954)
- Back to the Door (1959)
- My Mother Is Guilty (1960)

== Awards ==
- Xavier Villaurrutia Prize (1965)
- National Prize for Arts (1990)
