= El Gran secreto =

- Directed by: Jaques Remy
- Written by: Tulio Corella
- Starring: Mecha Ortiz, George Rigaud, Nury Montse.
- Cinematography: Pablo Tabernero
- Music by: George Andreani
- Release date: July 21, 1942
- Running time: 77 minutes.
- Country: Argentina
- Language: Spanish

El Gran secreto is a 1942 Argentine film of the Golden Age of Argentine cinema. A remake of the French Film “Conflict”, 1939

== Cast ==
Mecha Ortiz - Alicia
