= El día que cambió la historia =

- English: The day that history changed
- Directed by: Jorge Pastor Asuaje
- Written by: Jorge Pastor Asuaje; Sergio Pérez
- Produced by: Jorge Barreiro
- Starring: Lito Cruz; Micaela Cruz; Viviana Garcìa; Néstor Gianotti; Raúl Martínez Mollo; Celestino Morales; Walter Pelozo; Cipriano Reyes; María Roldán; Rubén Stella; Walter Zuleta
- Cinematography: Sergio Pérez
- Music by: Gustavo Zurbano
- Release date: March 15, 2011 (Argentina)
- Running time: 125 minutes
- Country: Argentina
- Language: Spanish

El día que cambió la historia is a 2011 Argentine documentary directed by Sergio Pérez and Jorge Pastor Asuaje film. It features Lito Cruz, Rubén Stella, Micaela Cruz and Amelia Bence.
