= Cruza =

- Directed by: Luis Moglia Barth
- Written by: Luis Moglia Barth, Claudio Martínez Payva
- Cinematography: Fulvio Testi
- Edited by: Carlos Rinaldi
- Music by: Lucio Demare
- Release date: 7 September 1942
- Running time: 85 minutes
- Country: Argentina
- Language: Spanish

Cruza is a 1942 Argentine film directed by Luis Moglia Barth during the Golden Age of Argentine cinema.

== Cast ==
- Amelia Bence
- Fernando Ochoa
- Pedro Maratea
- Carlos Morganti
- Elisardo Santalla
- Homero Cárpena
- Alfredo Mileo
- José Castro
- Eduardo Otero
- Billy Days
- Enrique Zingoni
- Iris Portillo
- Pilar Gómez
- Jorge Urban
- Eloy Álvarez
- Francisco Audenino
- Olga Nelly Barcia …Extra
