= Malambo (1942 film) =

- Directed by: Alberto de Zavalía
- Screenplay by: Hugo Mac Dougall
- Produced by: Alberto De Zavalia
- Cinematography: Roque Funes, Antonio Merayo (outdoors), José Suárez (indoors)
- Edited by: Oscar Carchano
- Music by: Alberto Ginastera
- Production company: Establecimientos Filmadores Argentinos (EFA)
- Release date: October 20, 1942 (Buenos Aires)
- Running time: 99 minutes
- Country: Argentina
- Language: Spanish

Malambo is a 1942 Argentine drama film directed by Alberto de Zavalía, written by Hugo Mac Dougall and starring Delia Garcés and Oscar Valicelli.

A celebrated film of the Golden Age of Argentine cinema, it received the Silver Condor Award for Best Original Screenplay at the 1943 Argentine Film Critics Association Awards, and was selected as the ninth greatest Argentine film of all time in a poll conducted by the Museo del Cine Pablo Ducrós Hicken in 1977.

== Cast ==
- Delia Garcés
- Oscar Valicelli
- Orestes Caviglia
- Milagros de la Vega
- Alberto Bello
- Nelo Cosimi
- Mariana Martí
- Tito Alonso
- Lucía Barause
- Margarita Burke
