= The House of the Crows =

- Directed by: Carlos F. Borcosque
- Written by: Gustavo Martínez Zuviria
- Release date: 1941
- Country: Argentina
- Language: Spanish

The House of the Crows (Spanish: La casa de los cuervos) is a 1941 Argentine film directed by Carlos F. Borcosque during the Golden Age of Argentine cinema.

== Cast ==
- Luis Aldás
- Amelia Bence
- Juan Bono
- Dario Cossier
- Enrique Giacovino
- Emilio Gola
- Miguel Gómez Bao
