= Dos basuras =

- Directed by: Kurt Land
- Release date: 1958
- Country: Argentina
- Language: Spanish

Dos basuras is a 1958 Argentine film. This black and white production was directed by Kurt Land and the script by Jose Maria Fernandez, Alfredo Unsain Ruanova, José María Fernández Unsain. It premiered on May 2, 1958, and starred Amelia Bence, Luis Prendes, Naomi Laserre and Luis Tasca as protagonists.

== Synopsis ==
A prostitute and Cloaquista try to put their lives together but a former wife complicates the relationship.

== Cast ==
- Amelia Bence ...María
- Luis Prendes ...Juan
- Noemí Laserre
- Luis Tasca
- Gloria Ferrandiz
- Ricardo Lavié ...María's Ex
- Jacques Arndt
- Félix Rivero
- Rafael Chumbita
- Carlos Spadavecchia
- Miguel Ángel Olmos
- Isidro Fernán Valdez
- Félix Camino
- Vicente Buono
- Beatriz Blassi
- Salvador Arcovichi
- Julio Sapia
- Josesito Ferradans
- Pedro Desio
- Marcelo Jaime
- Hermanas Galderisi
- Gina Cherini
- María Rodrigo
- Diana Romani
- Miguel Beltrán
- Alfredo Velázquez
