= Ashes to the Wind =

1942 film

- Directed by: Luis Saslavsky
- Written by: Carlos Adén
- Starring: Berta Singerman; Olinda Bozán; Pedro López Lagar
- Release date: 30 September 1942
- Country: Argentina
- Language: Spanish

Ashes to the Wind (Spanish: Ceniza al viento) is a 1942 Argentine film directed by Luis Saslavsky during the Golden Age of Argentine cinema.

== Cast ==
The cast is:

- Berta Singerman
- María Duval
- Luis Arata
- Santiago Arrieta
- Tita Merello
- Pedro López Lagar
- Alita Román
- Olinda Bozán
- Oscar Valliceli
- Malisa Zini
- José Squinquel
- Marcos Caplán
- Tilda Thamar
- Hedy Krilla
- Percival Murray
- Enrique René Cossa
- Guillermo Pedemonte
- Salvador Sinaí
- Haydeé Larroca
- Bertha Moss
- Luis Vigneri
- Carlos Geraldi
- Pedro Fiorito
- Alberto Adhemar
