= Bianca (TV series) =

1980 Argentine telenovela

Bianca is a 1980 Argentine telenovela starring Amelia Bence, Dora Baret, Víctor Hugo Vieyra and Arturo Bonín.
