= María Rosa (1946 film) =

1946 film

- Directed by: Luis Moglia Barth
- Written by: Ariel Cortazzo; Alberto Etchebehere; Àngel Guimerà; Francisco Madrid
- Starring: Amelia Bence; Enrique Diosdado; Alberto Closas
- Cinematography: Mario Pagés
- Edited by: José Gallego
- Music by: Alejandro Gutiérrez del Barrio
- Release date: 1946
- Running time: 80 minutes
- Country: Argentina
- Language: Spanish

María Rosa is a 1946 Argentine film of the classical era of Argentine cinema, directed by Luis Moglia Barth and starring Amelia Bence, Enrique Diosdado and Alberto Closas.

The film's sets were designed by the art director Ralph Pappier.

== Cast ==
- Amelia Bence
- Enrique Diosdado
- Alberto Closas
- Domingo Sapelli
- Helena Cortesina
- Alfonso Pisano
- Ramón Garay

== Bibliography ==
- Sergio Wolf & Abel Posadas. Cine argentino: La otra historia. Letra Buena, 1994.
