= Alfonsina (film) =

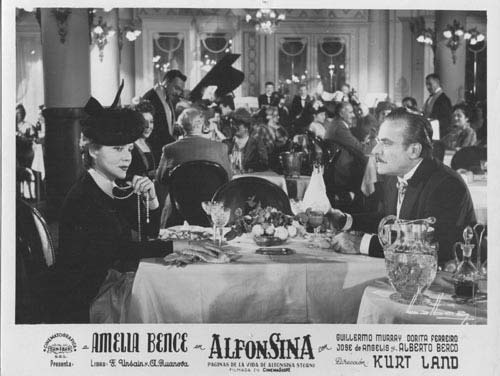
- Screenshot
- Directed by: Kurt Land
- Written by: José María Fernández Unsáin; Alfredo Ruanova
- Produced by: Kurt Land
- Starring: Amelia Bence; Guillermo Murray
- Cinematography: Alfredo Traverso
- Edited by: Vicente Castagno
- Music by: Tito Ribero
- Release date: 1957
- Running time: 90 minute
- Country: Argentina
- Language: Spanish

Alfonsina is a 1957 Argentine biographical film directed by Kurt Land and written by José María Fernández Unsáin. The film stars Amelia Bence and Guillermo Murray.

Bence stars as Argentine poet and journalist Alfonsina Storni, a pioneering woman who built a successful career in the male-dominated world of journalism. The film delves into key moments of her life and creative journey.

== Cast ==
- Amelia Bence como Alfonsina Storni
- Guillermo Murray
- Dorita Ferreyro
- José de Ángelis
- Alberto Berco
- Marcela Sola
- Alejandro Rey
- Enrique Kossi
- Domingo Mania

== Production ==
Alfonsina was the first Argentine film shot in the anamorphic CinemaScope format.

== Reception ==
According to critic Roland, it is a film "without perspective and without sensitivity (…) it fails to achieve the proper poetic significance."
