= Roberto Fernández Beyró =

Roberto Fernandez Beyro (1909–1991) was an Argentine journalist, restaurateur, and food critic who wrote a regular column in La Nación critiquing the lack of gastronomic traditions in Argentina. He was a member of several gourmet food clubs and wrote a cookbook of simple, traditional recipes.

== Biography ==
Roberto Antonio Fernandez Beyro Méndes Gonçalves was born on 27 October 1909 in Buenos Aires, Argentina to Juan Antonio Fernandez Beyro and María Eugenia Méndes Gonçalves. Fernandez Beyro managed restaurants in Buenos Aires, including the Jockey Club and Plaza Hotel and then opened his own restaurant, Monty's on Calle Honduras in Buenos Aires, and a restaurant in Rio de Janeiro, which allowed him to become an expert in Brazilian gastronomy. He was also a member of both the gourmet clubs Epicure and The Fork Club. He wrote a regular column in La Nación and collaborated with Miguel Brascó, who ran Diners magazine critiquing restaurants. He often criticized the lack of an Argentine gastronomic culture, believing that its traditional dishes were a poor mixture of recipes inherited from Spain combined with South American flavors. To counter that, he wrote a book, Los platos de mi mesa (Dishes from my Table), in 1986 of simple, traditional recipes.

In 1941, he fell in love with Amelia Bence, and they had a serious relationship until 1944. Bence refused to give up her career, which Fernandez Beyro insisted upon when he proposed, and she ended the relationship.

He died on 5 November 1991 in Buenos Aires, Argentina.
