= The Three Elenas =

1954 film

- Directed by: Emilio Gómez Muriel
- Written by: Paulino Masip
- Produced by: Gabriel Alarcón; Salvador Elizondo
- Starring: Amelia Bence; Manolo Fábregas; Domingo Soler
- Cinematography: Víctor Herrera
- Edited by: Jorge Bustos
- Music by: Gonzalo Curiel
- Production company: Reforma Films
- Release date: 16 April 1954
- Running time: 105 minutes
- Country: Mexico
- Language: Spanish

The Three Elenas (Spanish: Las tres Elenas) is a 1954 Mexican drama film directed by Emilio Gómez Muriel and starring Amelia Bence, Manolo Fábregas, and Domingo Soler. The film's sets were designed by the art director Manuel Fontanals.

== Cast ==
- Amelia Bence as Doña Elena Ugalde de Dueñas
- Manolo Fábregas as Luis Araiza
- Domingo Soler as Don Víctor Ugalde
- Ramón Gay as Manolo Dueñas
- Anabelle Gutiérrez as Elena, nieta
- Sara Guasch as Doña Sofía
- Jaime Fernández as Pablo
- María Gentil Arcos as María
- Martha Valdés as Esther
- Alicia Caro as Elena Dueñas, hija
- Roberto Corell as Cliente casa de juego
- Emilio Garibay as Jugador
- Jesús Gómez as Jugador
- Salvador Lozano as Doctor
- Pepe Martínez
- Lucrecia Muñoz as Soledad, sirvienta
- Ignacio Peón as Invitado a fiesta
- José Pidal as Abogado
- Fanny Schiller as Olimpia

== Bibliography ==
- Emilio García Riera. Historia documental del cine mexicano: 1953-1954. Universidad de Guadalajara, 1997.
