= Todo un hombre (1943 film) =

- Directed by: Pierre Chenal
- Screenplay by: Ulyses Petit de Murat, Homero Manzi, Miguel Mineo
- Based on: the novel Nada menos que todo un hombre by Miguel de Unamuno
- Cinematography: Bob Roberts
- Edited by: Gori Muñoz and Carlos Rinaldi
- Music by: Lucio Demare, Juan Ehlert
- Production company: Artistas Argentinos Asociados
- Release date: August 16, 1943 (Buenos Aires)
- Running time: 94 minutes
- Country: Argentina
- Language: Spanish

Todo un hombre (What a Man) is a 1943 Argentine romantic drama film of the Golden Age of Argentine cinema, directed by Pierre Chenal on his Latin film debut, and starring Francisco Petrone and Amelia Bence. Critically acclaimed, the film was compared by critics in Argentina to Jean Vigo's L'Atalante. At the 1944 Argentine Film Critics Association Awards, Petrone won the Silver Condor Award for Best Actor for his performance in the film.

== Plot ==
Francisco Petrone is a tough, hard-working independent river man, who finds it difficult to communicate and express his true feeling to his young wife (Amelia Bence). The two travel up a winding river, and tension between the two escalates.

== Cast ==
- Francisco Petrone
- Amelia Bence
- Nicolás Fregues
- Florindo Ferrario
- Guillermo Battaglia
- Ana Arneodo
- Tilda Thamar
- Renée Sutil
- Leticia Scuri
- Carlos Belluci
