= Goodbye Alexandra, Andrea =

Adiós, Alejandra, Andrea
- Directed by: Carlos Rinaldi
- Written by: Norberto Aroldi
- Produced by: Carlos Rinaldi
- Starring: Ángel Magaña; Raúl Padovani
- Edited by: Remo Charbonello; Atilio Rinaldi
- Release date: 19 April 1973
- Running time: 90 minutes
- Countries: Argentina; Spain
- Language: Spanish

Adiós Abuelo (English language: Goodbye Alexandra, Andrea) is a 1973 Argentine drama film directed by Carlos Rinaldi and written by Norberto Aroldi. The film starred Ángel Magaña and Raúl Padovani.

== Plot ==
A bachelor makes his family believe that the natural son of his deceased brother is actually his son.

== Cast ==
- Juan Alighieri
- Amelia Bence as Nora
- Constanza Maral as Raquel
- Ubaldo Martínez as Pedro
- Ángel Magaña as Yeyo
- Raúl Padovani as Vicente
- Eduardo Rudy as Padre Andrés
