= La otra y yo =

- English: The Other and Me
- Directed by: Antonio Momplet
- Written by: Boris H. Hardy; Louis Verneuil
- Cinematography: Bob Roberts
- Edited by: José Cañizares
- Music by: George Andreani
- Release date: 1949
- Running time: 80 minutes
- Country: Argentina
- Language: Spanish

La otra y yo is a 1949 Argentine comedy film of the classical era of Argentine cinema, directed by Antonio Momplet and starring Amelia Bence, Enrique Alvarez Diosdado, Fernando Lamas and Mercedes Simone.
