= Osvaldo Cattone =

Argentine actor (1933–2021)

- Born: Osvaldo Inocencio Cattone Ripamonti; 25 January 1933; Buenos Aires, Argentina
- Died: 8 February 2021 (aged 88); Lima, Peru
- Occupations: Actor, theater director
- Years active: 1950-2021

Osvaldo Cattone (25 January 1933 – 8 February 2021) was an Argentine actor who lived for over three decades in Peru and was considered one of the pioneer theater directors and actors of Peru.

== Biography ==
Osvaldo Inocencio Cattone Ripamonti was born in Buenos Aires, Argentina on 25 January 1933. From the age of eight, he acted with a troupe called La Pandilla Marylin and at age nine was selected by Enrique Santos Discépolo to be part of the cast for a musical revue in the Teatro Casino, portraying the son of Aída Olivier. By 1952, he was both acting and directing in a production of La inocente de Lenormand which opened at the Teatro Regina. In 1953, he did two plays at the Instituto de Arte Moderno: Romeo and Juliet with Ricardo Vianna, Fanny Alberte, Jacinto Pérez Heredia and Alejandro Oster; and Elizabeth de Inglaterra (Elizabeth of England) by Ferdinand Bruckner with Josefina Melo, Juan Carlos Puppo, Tito Nóbili and José María Fra. In the early 1950s, he married his first wife, Enriqueta, from whom he quickly separated and then began a nine-year marriage to the actress Inda Ledesma. In 1954, Cattone traveled to Italy and enrolled in the Accademia Nazionale di Arte Drammatica Silvio D'Amico. Four years later, he graduated, became the first South American actor with a diploma and then returned to Argentina in 1959.

He returned to acting and worked on stage and on television in such productions as La visita de la anciana dama, Borrasca y Lysistrata, the Channel 13 telenovela Una vida para amarte with Gabriela Gili and Eva Franco and the series Carola y Carolina with Silvia and Mirtha Legrand. In 1964, Cattone began a relationship with Amelia Bence and directed her in "Doña Rosita, la soltera". He also toured throughout Argentina in the play Las mariposas son libres with Susana Giménez and Rodolfo Bebán. In 1973, he was hired to act in a Peruvian telenovela called Me llaman Gorrión and also did some theater acting in Peru. Then in 1976, he was hired to manage the Teatro Marsano and began producing theatrical works. Within three years he bought the theater and began nurturing the infant theater industry, inviting well-known Argentines such as Norma Aleandro, Amelia Bence, María Rosa Gallo, Eva Franco, Susana Rinaldi, China Zorrilla and others, to come and perform. Throughout the 1980s and 1990s, Cattone produced both stage plays and television productions, such as "La loba" both a play and a television series in 1982 and La casa de enfrente a telenovela in 1985 both which starred Bence.

In 2005, after more than three decades of living and working in Peru, Cattone returned to Argentina to stage a play called Afectos compartidos, which starred Analía Gadé and Nati Mistral. In his later years, Cattone has returned to acting. He has completed 108 productions over his career. In 2015, he was starring in Justo en lo mejor de mi Vida.

He died from a prostate infection, fourteen days after his 88th birthday.

== Credits ==
=== Director ===
- Escenas de la vida conyugal - Teatro Marsano (2012)
- 8 Mujeres - Teatro Marsano (2012)
- El próximo año, a la misma hora - Teatro Marsano (2012-Enero an ABril)
- Mi Mas Sentido Sexo - Teatro Marsano
- Un Don Juan en el infierno (2011)
- Cómo vivir sin un hombre y no morir en el intento (2010)
- La sagrada familia (2010)
- Dos por uno, la pipa de la paz (2010)
- Dos por uno, negociemos (2010)
- Cabaret (2009)
- El último de los amantes ardientes (2009) Reposición
- Gorda (2009)
- En la cama (2009)
- Los monólogos de la vagina (2008) Reposición
- Matrimonio a la peruana (2007-2008)
- Cholita querida (2007)
- Cadenas de seda (2007)
- Marido + Mujer = Desastre (2007)
- Yo amo a shirley (2006)
- Novio, marido y amante (2006)
- Made in Perú (2005)
- El club de las mal casadas (2005)
- Justo en lo mejor de mi vida (2005)
- Secretos de mujeres (2004)
- Matrimonio.com (2004)
- Brujas (2003)
- Trapitos al aire (2003)
- La novia era él (2003)
- Variaciones enigmáticas (2003)
- Que hago con dos maridos (2002)
- La respuesta (2002)
- Venezia (2002)
- Los monólogos de la vagina (2001)
- Las viejas vienen marchando (2001)
- La cena de los tarados (2001)
- Matrimonio.. y algo más (2000)
- Los chismes de las mujeres (2000)
- Divos (2000)
- Candidato a la presidencia (2000)
- El submarino (1999)
- El matrimonio perjudica seriamente la salud (1999)
- Art (1998)
- Cartas de amor (1998)
- Cómo vivir sin un hombre y no morir en el intento (1998)
- El diario íntimo de Adán y Eva (1997)
- Annie (1997) Reposición
- Con el sexo no se juega (1996-1997)
- Algo en común (1996)
- Taxi 2 (1995-1996)
- Ha llegado un inspector (1995)
- Pijamas (1995)
- El candidato de Dios (1994)
- Perdidos en algún lugar (1993)
- Brujas (1993) Reposición
- Relaciones peligrosas' (1992)
- Brujas (1991)
- Vidas privadas (1991)
- Tres mujeres para el show (1991)
- Chismes (1991)
- Un don Juan en el infierno (1990)
- Sor-presas (1990)
- Escenas de la vida conyugal (1989)
- El último de los amantes ardientes (1989)
- Quién se queda con mamá (1988-1989)
- El hombre de La Mancha (1988). Reposición
- Panorama desde el puente (1988)
- Annie (1987-1988)
- Sólo 80 (1987)
- Extraña pareja (1987)
- Taxi (1986)
- Cattone de punta a punta (1985-1986)
- Los árboles mueren de pie (1985)
- Mamá soltera (1984)
- Doña Flor y sus dos maridos (1984)
- Yo te quiero, yo tampoco (1984)
- El diluvio que viene (1982-1983)
- Trampa mortal (1982)
- La loba (1982)
- El placer de su compañía (1981)
- Hijos de un dios menor (1981)
- Salvar a los delfines (1981)
- Reina por un día (1981)
- Historia del zoo (1980)
- Basta de sexo, somos decentes (1980)
- Doña Rosita la soltera (1980)
- El hombre de La Mancha (1979)
- Mi adorado embustero (1978)
- Espíritu travieso (1978)
- Otelo (1978)
- Lluvia (1978)
- Gigi (1977-1978)
- Eqqus (1977)
- La esposa constante (1977)
- Aleluya, Aleluya (1976)
- Mi muñeca favorita (1976)
- Las mariposas son libres (1975)
- La tercera palabra (1975)
- No hay edad para el amor (1975)
- Los ojos llenos de amor (1974)
- La inocente (1952)

=== Actor ===
==== Television ====
- Habacilar (2011)
- Desafío y Fama (2007-2009)
- Comiendo con Cattone (1984-1985)
- Me llaman Gorrión (1973-1974) Telenovela
- Así amaban los héroes (1971) Telenovela
- Nino (1971) Telenovela
- Carola y Carolina (1970) Telenovela
- Una vida para amarte (1970) Telenovela

==== Theater ====
- 12 hombres en pugna (2013)
- Duelo de ángeles (2013)
- Dos por uno, negociemos (2010)
- El último de los amantes ardientes (2009) Reposición
- En la cama (2009)
- Matrimonio a la peruana (2007-2008)
- Cholita querida (2007)
- Marido + Mujer = Desastre (2007)
- Novio, marido y amante (2006)
- Justo en lo mejor de mi vida (2005)
- Matrimonio.com (2004)
- Trapitos al aire (2003)
- Variaciones enigmáticas (2003)
- La cena de los tarados (2001)
- Matrimonio.. y algo más (2000)
- Candidato a la presidencia (2000)
- El matrimonio perjudica seriamente la salud (1999)
- Art (1998)
- Cartas de amor (1998)
- El diario íntimo de Adán y Eva (1997)
- Annie (1997) Reposición
- Con el sexo no se juega (1996-1997)
- Algo en común (1996)
- Taxi 2 (1995-1996)
- El candidato de Dios (1994)
- Vidas privadas (1991)
- Un don Juan en el infierno (1990)
- Escenas de la vida conyugal (1989)
- El último de los amantes ardientes (1989)
- Quién se queda con mamá (1988-1989)
- El hombre de La Mancha (1988). Reposición
- Annie (1987-1988)
- Taxi (1986)
- Cattone de punta a punta (1985-1986)
- Doña Flor y sus dos maridos (1984)
- Yo te quiero, yo tampoco (1984)
- El diluvio que viene (1982-1983)
- El placer de su compañía (1981)
- Hijos de un dios menor (1981)
- Historia del Zoo (1980)
- Basta de sexo, somos decentes (1980)
- El hombre de La Mancha (1979)
- Mi adorado embustero (1978)
- Otelo (1978)
- Eqqus (1977)
- Mi muñeca favorita (1976)
- Las mariposas son libres (1975)
- La tercera palabra (1975)
- No hay edad para el amor (1975)
- Los ojos llenos de amor (1974)
- Una chica en mi sopa (1973)
- Las mariposas son libres (1971-1972)
- O.K. (1970)
- Un dios durmió en casa (1970)
- El amor tiene su aquel (1961-1962)
- La visita de la anciana dama (1960)
- Borrasca (1960)
- Lysistrata (1960)
- La biunda (1953)
- Elizabeth de Inglaterra (1953)
- Romeo y Julieta (1953)
- La inocente (1952)
