= The Man Who Owed a Death =

El hombre que debía una muerte
- Directed by: Mario Soffici
- Written by: Carlos A. Olivari; Sixto Pondal Ríos
- Produced by: Eduardo Bedoya
- Starring: Amelia Bence; Carlos Cores
- Cinematography: Francis Boeniger
- Edited by: Ricardo Rodríguez Nistal; Atilio Rinaldi
- Music by: Tito Ribero
- Release date: 1955
- Running time: 80 minutes
- Country: Argentina
- Language: Spanish

El hombre que debía una muerte (English: The Man Who Owed a Death) is a 1955 Argentine crime film directed by Mario Soffici and starring Amelia Bence and Carlos Cores.

== Synopsis ==
A man named Héctor Rossi travels to La Rioja and fakes involvement in a bus accident while following a school-teacher, Leonor. The teacher takes the man in and lets him stay and recover from his injuries at her house for a while, but after two weeks they fall in love and marry. What Leonor does not know is that Rossi is the boyfriend of Celina Reyes, who in turn is secretary to Leonor's rich, estranged uncle, Don Roque Fontán. When Don Roque winds up dead in an "accident" at work (devised by Rossi, Reyes and a foreign hitman), Leonor and Héctor inherit both his manor at Buenos Aires and his fortune.

The next step is killing Leonor, so Rossi, as a game, tricks her into writing a suicide note and leaves the gas running on her as she sleeps. She is almost killed, but survives the murder attempt. Pressured by Celina, who wants to return to Héctor as quickly as possible, and the hitman, who still claims part of his share, Rossi decides to kill Leonor during their honeymoon back at La Rioja. The opportunity arises when they find themselves trapped on a chairlift, but Rossi is unable to do so as he has fallen in love with her.

Back at Buenos Aires, the hitman is wounded in a gunfight while trying to cross over to Uruguay, but dies before being able to clear Don Roque's partner, Carlomagno, from suspicion over the "accident". Leonor, who had seen the hitman talk twice to her husband, realizes he was one of the workers at the construction site where Don Roque died, and makes the connection. She calls the police, who tail Rossi and spy on him as he buys poison.

Back at the manor, Rossi is arrested for trying to poison his wife, but this proves false when he himself drinks the glass he was about to give her. He instead accompanies the police to Reyes' home, where they find her dead with a suicide letter next to her – the same letter she had written during the game where Leonor had written hers. This alerts Leonor, who waits for her husband knowing he has killed Celina. The police soon find out and ambush Rossi as he attempts to flee the premises. He is wounded in the ensuing gunfight, and dies telling Leonor that everything was a lie but this: he truly loved her.
