= Las 24 horas =

1982 Argentine telenovela

Las 24 horas is a 1982 Argentine telenovela starring Amelia Bence, Héctor Biuchet, and Alba Castellanos. It aired on Canal 13.
