= Nada más que amor =

- Release date: 1942
- Country: Chile
- Language: Spanish

Nada más que amor (lit. "Nothing but love") is a 1942 Chilean film directed by Patricio Kaulen and starring Alberto Closas.
