= The Marriage Industry =

La Industria del matrimonio
- Directed by: Fernando Ayala; Luis Saslavsky; Enrique Carreras
- Written by: Ariel Cortazzo
- Starring: Tita Merello; Ángel Magaña; Amalia Bernabé
- Release date: 1965
- Running time: 95 minute
- Country: Argentina
- Language: Spanish

The Marriage Industry (La Industria del matrimonio) is a 1965 Argentine film directed by Fernando Ayala, Luis Saslavsky and Enrique Carreras.
