= Alfredo Ruanova =

Argentine writer and film producer (1919–1977)

- Born: Alfredo Esteban Díaz Ruanova; November 10, 1919; Buenos Aires, Argentina
- Died: January 1, 1977 (aged 57); Mexico City, Mexico
- Other name: Alfredo Unsain Ruanova

Alfredo Ruanova (November 10, 1919 – January 1, 1977) was an Argentine writer, screenwriter and film producer.

== Filmography ==
- 1977 La obertura
- 1976 The Kids Grow Up
- 1974 Satanás de todos los horrores (screenplay)
- 1973 El barón de Brankován, El exterminador (TV Mini Series) (3 episodes)
- 1973 The Man and the Beast (adaptation)
- 1972 Basuras humanas (story - adaptation)
- 1972 Me enamoré sin darme cuenta
- 1972 Todos los pecados del mundo (as Alfredo Díaz Ruanova)
- 1971 En estas camas nadie duerme
- 1971 The Professor (adaptation)
- 1971 Los corrompidos
- 1970 La buscona (story - adaptation)
- 1970 Su precio... unos dólares (story)
- 1970 Peach Blossom
- 1969 Los siete proscritos (writer)
- 1969 Mujeres de medianoche (adaptation) / (screenplay)
- 1969 Las impuras (screenplay)
- 1969 Con licencia para matar (screenplay)
- 1969 El hijo pródigo (story - adaptation)
- 1969 Arriba las manos Texano (adaptation)
- 1969 Una horca para el Texano (adaptation)
- 1969 Muñecas peligrosas (screenplay)
- 1968 Pasaporte a la muerte (screenplay) / (story)
- 1968 Cinco en la cárcel (writer)
- 1968 The Bed (adaptation)
- 1968 Los amores de Juan Charrasqueado (adaptation)
- 1968 Blue Demon: Destructor of Spies (story and screenplay)
- 1968 A Woman Possessed (adaptation) / (screenplay)
- 1968 El corrido del hijo desobediente (writer)
- 1968 4 contra el crimen (screenplay)
- 1968 Esclava del deseo (writer)
- 1968 Báñame mi amor (writer)
- 1967 Pasión oculta (adaptation) / (story)
- 1967 Amanecí en tus brazos (adaptation)
- 1967 El asesino se embarca
- 1967 Rocambole contra la secta del escorpión (story and screenplay)
- 1967 Rocambole contra las mujeres arpías (story & screenplay)
- 1967 La perra
- 1966 Planet of the Female Invaders (screenplay) / (story)
- 1966 El secreto del texano (adaptation) / (story)
- 1966 Vuelve el Texano (adaptation) / (story)
- 1966 Sangre en el Bravo (story and adaptation)
- 1966 ¡Viva Benito Canales!
- 1966 Me cansé de rogarle
- 1966 Gigantes planetarios (story and screenplay)
- 1966 Muchachos impacientes
- 1966 Gallo corriente, gallo valiente (story and screenplay)
- 1966 Nosotros los jóvenes (story and adaptation)
- 1966 La mano que aprieta (screenplay)
- 1966 Los Sánchez deben morir (screenplay)
- 1966 Los endemoniados del ring (story & screenplay)
- 1966 El fugitivo (screenplay) / (story)
- 1965 El asalto (story)
- 1965 Los sheriffs de la frontera
- 1965 Cada oveja con su pareja
- 1965 Alma llanera (film) (story and screenplay)
- 1965 The Curse of Gold (story)
- 1965 Para todas hay (story and adaptation)
- 1965 Neutron Battles the Karate Assassins (screenplay) / (story)
- 1965 Nacidos para cantar
- 1965 Canta mi corazón (screenplay) / (story)
- 1965 El pueblo fantasma (screenplay) / (story)
- 1965 El texano (screenplay)
- 1964 Neutron vs. the Maniac (screenplay) / (story)
- 1964 Shadow of the Black Hand (story and screenplay)
- 1964 Las invencibles (story and adaptation)
- 1964 Los hermanos Barragán (screenplay)
- 1964 En la mitad del mundo
- 1964 La sonrisa de los pobres (screenplay)
- 1964 Las hijas del Zorro (story and adaptation)
- 1964 Las dos galleras (Writer)
- 1964 Dos inocentes mujeriegos (story and adaptation)
- 1964 Tres muchachas de Jalisco (screenplay) / (story)
- 1963 Dos alegres gavilanes (story and adaptation)
- 1963 La garra del leopardo (story)
- 1963 Tres palomas alborotadas (writer)
- 1963 La Diosa impura (writer)
- 1963 Tin-Tan el hombre mono (adaptation)
- 1963 De color moreno (screenplay) / (story)
- 1963 Qué bonito es querer (adaptation) / (story)
- 1963 Las vengadoras enmascaradas (story and adaptation)
- 1963 La huella macabra (story)
- 1963 Bring Me the Vampire (adaptation)
- 1963 Mi vida es una canción (writer)
- 1963 Los parranderos (adaptation) / (story)
- 1963 Los apuros de dos gallos (adaptation)
- 1963 Aventuras de las hermanas X (story)
- 1963 The Incredible Face of Dr. B (story and adaptation)
- 1963 Vuelven los Argumedo (story and adaptation)
- 1963 The Terrible Giant of the Snow (writer)
- 1963 El tesoro del rey Salomón (story)
- 1963 House of the Frights (adaptation)
- 1963 Neutrón contra el Dr. Caronte (story and adaptation)
- 1963 El monstruo de los volcanes (adaptation) / (story)
- 1963 Dos gallos y dos gallinas (screenplay) / (story)
- 1962 La sangre de Nostradamus
- 1962 Genii of Darkness
- 1962 Ahí vienen los Argumedo
- 1962 Sangre en el ring (story and adaptation)
- 1962 La entrega de Chucho el Roto
- 1962 Los autómatas de la muerte (story and adaptation)
- 1962 Dinamita Kid (story and adaptation)
- 1962 The Witch's Mirror (screenplay) / (story)
- 1962 Twist locura de la juventud
- 1962 El malvado Carabel (adaptation)
- 1962 Nostradamus y el destructor de monstruos (story and adaptation)
- 1961 La captura de Chucho el Roto
- 1961 Que me maten en tus brazos
- 1961 Aventuras de Chucho el Roto
- 1961 The Curse of Nostradamus (story and adaptation)
- 1961 Gang Leader (story)
- 1960 Neutrón, el enmascarado negro (story and adaptation)
- 1960 The Phantom of the Operetta (1960 film) (story)
- 1960 The Hell of Frankenstein (adaptation) / (story)
- 1960 Chucho el Roto (film)
- 1958 Dos basuras (writer)
- 1957 La sombra de Safo
- 1957 Alfonsina (film)
- 1955 Vida nocturna
- 1955 The Phantom of the Operetta (1955 film)
- 1955 El mal amor
- 1953 Del otro lado del puente (writer)
- 1951 Derecho viejo

== Bibliography ==
- Manrupe, Raúl; Portela, María Alejandra (2001). A dictionary of Argentine films (1930-1995). Buenos Aires: Editorial Corregidor. ISBN 950-05-0896-6.
