= Back to the Door =

1959 film

- Spanish: De espaldas a la puerta
- Directed by: José María Forqué
- Written by: Luis de los Arcos; José María Forqué; Alfonso Paso
- Produced by: Gabriel Alarcón; Salvador Elizondo
- Starring: Emma Penella; Amelia Bence; Luis Prendes
- Cinematography: Heinrich Gärtner
- Edited by: Julio Peña
- Music by: Ramón Vives
- Production company: Chamartín Producciones y Distribuciones
- Distributed by: Chamartín
- Release date: 12 December 1959
- Running time: 88 minutes
- Country: Spain
- Language: Spanish

Back to the Door (Spanish: De espaldas a la puerta) is a 1959 Spanish crime film directed by José María Forqué and starring Emma Penella, Amelia Bence and Luis Prendes.

== Cast ==
- Emma Penella as Lola
- Amelia Bence as Lidia
- Luis Prendes as Enrique Simón
- Elisa Loti as Patricia
- José María Vilches as Tonio
- José Marco Davó as Barea
- José Luis López Vázquez as Arévalo
- Carlos Mendy as Perico
- Félix Dafauce as Doctor Ponce
- Adriano Domínguez as Fermín
- Mariano Azaña as Alvarito
- Carmen Bernardos
- Marisa Núñez
- María del Valle as Amanda
- María Luisa Merlo as Lucky
- Luis Peña as Luis
- Irene López Heredia as Luisa
