= Reforma Films =

Reforma Films was a Mexican film production company.

== Selected filmography ==
- La red (1953)
- Siete mujeres (1953)
- The Proud and the Beautiful (1953)
- Retorno a la juventud (1954)
- Las tres Elenas (1954)
- Chucho el Roto (1955)
- María la Voz (1955)
- Non scherzare con le donne (1955)
- Las hijas de Elena (1964)
