= El Haragán de la familia =

- Film poster
- Directed by: Luis Cesar Amadori
- Written by: Luis Cesar Amadori with Ivo Pelay
- Starring: Pepe Arias
- Cinematography: Hugo Chiesa
- Edited by: Nicolas Proserpio
- Music by: Mario Maurano
- Distributed by: Argentina Sono Film
- Release date: 21 February 1940
- Running time: 87 minutes
- Country: Argentina
- Language: Spanish

El Haragán de la familia (The Lazy One in the Family) is a 1940 Argentine comedy film of the Golden Age of Argentine cinema directed by Luis Cesar Amadori, who also co-wrote it along with Ivo Pelay.

== Cast ==
- Pepe Arias
- Amelia Bence
- Ernesto Raquén
- Gloria Bayardo
- Mirtha Rey
- Alfredo Fornaserio
- Justo José Caraballo
- Angelina Pagano
- Juan José Piñeiro
- Elvira Quiroga
- José A. Paonessa
- Miguel Coiro
