= León Zárate =

Argentine actor

León Zárate was an Argentine actor. He appeared in films such as Mateo (1925), La muchacha del circo (1937), El forastero (1937), De la sierra al valle (1938), El patio de la morocha (1951), and Cerro Guanaco (1959).

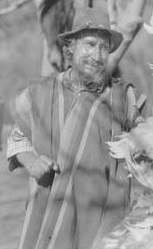
León Zárate was an Argentine actor.
