= Esos que dicen amarse =

Esos que dicen amarse is a 1992 Argentine telenovela, which aired on Canal 9. It stars Raul Taibo, Carolina Papaleo and Amelia Bence.

The telenovela was remarkable in Argentine television for openly portraying a lesbian relationship through the character Cristina Alberó, making it one of the first telenovelas in the country to center same-sex romance in its main storyline. Its theme song, performed by Marilina Ross, gained popularity and is remembered as the leitmotif of the series’ romantic drama.
