= Sweethearts for the Girls =

1941 film

- Directed by: Antonio Momplet
- Written by: René Garzón; Joaquín Álvarez Quintero; Serafín Álvarez Quintero
- Starring: Tito Lusiardo
- Release date: 29 January 1941
- Running time: 70 minutes
- Country: Argentina
- Language: Spanish

Sweethearts for the Girls (Spanish: Novios para las muchachas) is a 1941 Argentine comedy film of the Golden Age of Argentine cinema, directed by Antonio Momplet and starring Santiago Arrieta.

== Cast ==
- Tito Lusiardo
- Amelia Bence
- Felisa Mary
- Nélida Bilbao
- Paquita Vehil
- Silvana Roth
- Lea Conti
- Pablo Palitos
