= Seven Women (1953 film) =

1953 film by Juan Bustillo Oro

- Directed by: Juan Bustillo Oro
- Written by: Julio Alejandro; Juan Bustillo Oro
- Based on: Los hijos de la noche 1939 play by Leandro Navarro; Adolfo Torrado
- Produced by: Salvador Elizondo; Abel Salazar
- Starring: Amelia Bence; Alma Rosa Aguirre; Bárbara Gil
- Cinematography: Raúl Martínez Solares
- Edited by: Jorge Bustos
- Music by: Gonzalo Curiel
- Production company: Reforma Films
- Release date: 19 June 1953
- Running time: 90 minutes
- Country: Mexico
- Language: Spanish

Seven Women (Spanish:Siete Mujeres) is a 1953 Mexican drama film directed by Juan Bustillo Oro, and starring Amelia Bence, Alma Rosa Aguirre, Bárbara Gil, Sara Guasch, Anabel Gutiérrez, Maruja Grifell and Prudencia Grifell. This film is based on a play of the same name which had previously been adapted into the 1944 Argentine film Seven Women.

The film's sets were designed by art director Manuel Fontanals.

== Cast ==
- Alma Rosa Aguirre
- Amelia Bence
- Conchita Gentil Arcos
- Bárbara Gil
- Maruja Grifell
- Prudencia Grifell
- Sara Guasch
- Anabelle Gutiérrez
- Queta Lavat
- Bertha Lehar
- Abel Salazar

== Bibliography ==
- Emilio García Riera. Historia del cine mexicano. Secretaría de Educación Pública, 1986.
