= Julio Sánchez Gardel =

Argentine dramatist and writer

Julio Sánchez Gardel (15 December 1879 in Catamarca- 18 March 1937 in Buenos Aires) was an Argentine dramatist and writer.

== Works ==
- Almas grandes (1904)
- Ley humana (1904)
- En el abismo (1905)
- La garza (1906)
- Cara o cruz (1907)
- Noche de luna (1907), dedicated to his mother
- Las dos fuerzas or Amor de otoño (1907)
- Botón de rosa (1907)
- Los ojos del ciego (1908)
- Las campanas (1908)
- Frente al llano (1909)
- La otra (1910)
- Después de misa (1910)
- Los mirasoles (1911)
- La montaña de las brujas (1912)
- Sol de invierno (1914)
- La vendimia (1915)
- El zonda (1915)
- La llegada del batallón (1916)
- Los cuenteros (1917)
- El príncipe heredero (1918)
- Perdonemos (1923)
- El dueño del pueblo (1925)
- Las quita penas (1927)
- El cascabel del duende (1930)
