= Son cartas de amor =

1943 film

- Directed by: Luis César Amadori
- Starring: Amelia Bence; Pedro López Lagar; Hugo Pimentel
- Cinematography: Alberto Etchebehere
- Release date: 1943
- Running time: 94 minutes
- Country: Argentina
- Language: Spanish

Son cartas de amor (Spanish: Novios para las muchachas) is a 1943 Argentine comedy film of the classical era of Argentine cinema directed by Luis César Amadori and starring Amelia Bence.

== Cast ==
- Amelia Bence
- Enrique Chaico
- Ada Cornaro
- Pedro López Lagar
- Liana Moabro
- José Antonio Paonessa
- Hugo Pimentel
- Juan José Piñeiro
- Julio Renato
- José Ruzzo
- Aída Villadeamigo
