= Alberto Closas =

Spanish actor

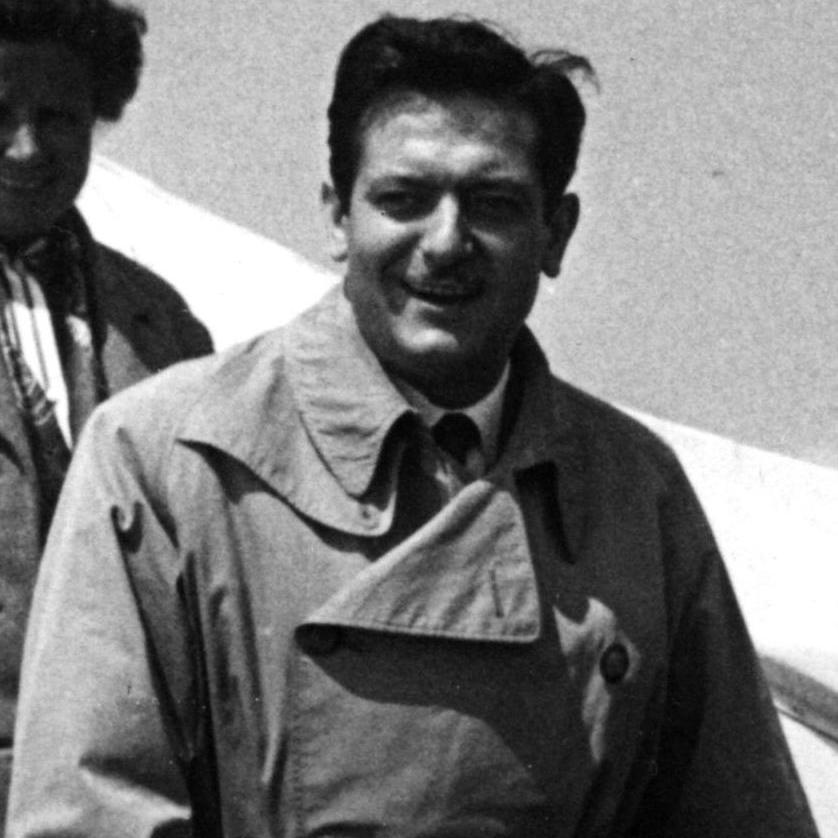
- Closas in 1948
- Born: Alberto Closas Lluró; 30 October 1921; Barcelona, Spain
- Died: 19 September 1994 (aged 72); Madrid, Spain
- Occupation: Actor

Alberto Closas Lluró (30 October 1921, in Barcelona – 19 September 1994, in Madrid) was a prolific Spanish film actor who appeared in the Cinema of Argentina in the 1940s and 1950s and in Spanish cinema after 1955.

His family emigrated to Argentina in 1936 during the Spanish Civil War where in 1942 he acted in his first film Nada más que amor. He made over 90 film and television appearances and continued to appear on Spanish television until his death in September 1994 from lung cancer.

He was married to Argentine actress Amelia Bence from 1950 to 1955.

== Filmography ==
- "Compuesta y sin novio" (1 episode, 1994)
- "Farmacia de guardia" (1 episode, 1994)
- Maestro de esgrima, El (1992) .... Álvaro Salanova
- "Sóc com sóc" (1990) TV Series .... Carles Ribalta
- Esquilache (1989) .... Duque de Villasanta
- "Gatos en el tejado" (5 episodes, 1988)
- De halcones y palomas (1986)
- "Goya" (1985) (mini) TV Series
- Últimas tardes con Teresa (1984)
- "Cuatro hombres para Eva" (1984) TV Series
- "Anillos de oro" .... Antonio (1 episode, 1983)
- Divorcio que viene, El (1980) .... Pedrizosa
- Familia, bien, gracias, La (1979) .... Carlos
- Rabona, La (1979)
- Two Men and Two Women Amongst Them (1977)
- Bodas de cristal (1975)
- "Estudio 1" (1 episode, 1973)
- Experiencia prematrimonial (1972)
- "Cuatro historias de alquiler" (1971) TV Series
- Hombre solo, Un (1969)
- Blood in the Bullring (1969)
- Taxi de los conflictos, El (1969) .... El atracador
- Día es un día, Un (1968)
- "Doce caras de Juan, Las" .... Juan (10 episodes, 1967)
- Chicos del Preu, Los (1967)
- De cuerpo presente (1967)
- Viudas, Las (1966) .... segment 'El aniversario'
- Operación Plus Ultra (1966)
- Monnaie de singe (1966) .... Le baron Bullourde
- Muere una mujer (1965) .... Javier
- Familia y... uno más, La (1965)
- Assassinio made in Italy (1965)
- Diablo también llora, El (1965) .... Fernando Quiroga
- Visita que no tocó el timbre, La (1965) .... Santiago
- Casi un caballero (1964) .... Alberto
- Piso de soltero (1964)
- Operación: Embajada (1963)
- "Canciones infantiles" (1963) TV Series
- La Gran Familia (1962) .... Carlos, el padre
- Solteros de verano (1962)
- Usted puede ser un asesino (1961)
- Navidades en junio (1960) .... Dr. Julio Medina
- María, matrícula de Bilbao (1960)
- El traje de oro (1960)
- Cielo dentro de la casa, El (1960)
- Baile, El (1959) .... Pedro
- Gran señora, Una (1959)
- Charlestón (1959)
- Muchachita de Valladolid, Una (1958) .... Patricio
- Fifth District (1958)
- Pasado te acusa, El (1958) .... Piero
- "Ese no sé qué de Casanova" (1958) TV Series
- Tesoro en el cielo, Un (1957)
- We're All Necessary (1956)
- Vida en un bloc, La (1956)
- Fierecilla domada, La (1956) .... Don Beltrán de Lara
- Death of a Cyclist (1955) .... Juan Fernandes Soler
- Ensayo final (1955)
- Tren internacional (1954)
- Dama del mar, La (1954)
- Mi viudo y yo (1954)
- En carne viva (1954)
- The Idol (1952)
- Mi mujer está loca (1952)
- The Honourable Tenant (1951) .... Luis Ayala
- To Live for a Moment (1951)
- Cuidado con las mujeres (1951)
- Pies descalzos (1950)
- Campeón a la fuerza (1950)
- Vendedora de fantasías, La (1950)
- Romance en tres noches (1950)
- Otro yo de Marcela, El (1950)
- Danza del fuego, La (1949)
- Story of a Bad Woman (1948)
- Gran tentación, La (1948)
- Tierra del fuego (1948)
- The Cat (1947)
- 27 millones (1947)
- Cristina (1946)
- María Rosa (1946)
- The Sin of Julia (1946)
- Honra de los hombres, La (1946)
- Encrucijada (1946)
- The Prodigal Woman (1945)
- Relegado de Pichintún, El (1943)
- P'al otro lado (1942)
- Nada más que amor (1942)
