= Road of Hell (1946 film) =

- Directed by: Luis Saslavsky and Daniel Tinayre
- Written by: Luis Saslavsky and Ariel Cortazzo
- Starring: Mecha Ortiz; Pedro López Lagar; Amelia Bence
- Cinematography: Antonio Merayo and Mario Pagés
- Edited by: Oscar Carchano and José Gallegos
- Music by: César Brero
- Distributed by: Estudios San Miguel
- Release date: 1946
- Running time: 96 minutes
- Country: Argentina
- Language: Spanish

Road of Hell (Spanish:Camino del infierno) is a 1946 Argentine film from the classical era of Argentine cinema, produced by Estudios San Miguel and directed by Luis Saslavsky and Daniel Tinayre.

== Plot ==
A melodramatic, psychological thriller, the film tells the story of a young wealthy widow, who is unhappy. She meets a Bohemian artist who marries her to escape the poverty of his family, but is stifled by her possessiveness and jealousy. The plot centers around a love triangle, which was bold for its time.

== Cast ==
- Mecha Ortiz
- Pedro López Lagar
- Amelia Bence
- Elsa O'Connor
- Alberto Bello
