= Alberto de Zavalía =

Argentine film director and film producer

Alberto de Zavalia (4 May 1911 – 7 May 1988 in Buenos Aires) was an Argentine film director and film producer notable for his work during the classical era of Argentine cinema.

== Biography ==
De Zavalía was born in Buenos Aires to a middle-class, well-off family. He completed law school but never worked as a lawyer, instead dedicating himself to movie-making, an industry that was then thriving. In 1935, he co-founded with Luis Saslavsky the producer SIFAL, which disbanded that very same year, but each of its founders managed to debut as filmmakers: De Zavalía directed Escala en la ciudad, which he also wrote, while Saslavsky directed his second and most famous movie, Crimen a las tres.

De Zavalía went on to writer and direct The Caranchos of Florida in 1938, but came to prominence in 1939 when he was asked to adapt a biography of the recently deceased Carlos Gardel to the screen, starring Hugo del Carril. It was during production that he met actress Delia Garcés, who went on to become her wife and starred in most of his films then on.

De Zavalía directed another 12 movies throughout his career, also writing the last two. He retired in 1950 from movie business, and died in 1988.

== Filmography ==
- El Otro yo de Marcela (1950)
- La Doctora quiere tangos (1949)
- De padre desconocido (1949)
- El Hombre que amé (1947)
- Rosa de América (1946)
- El Gran amor de Bécquer (1946)
- El Fin de la noche (1944)
- Cuando florezca el naranjo (1943)
- Malambo (1942)
- Concierto de almas (1942)
- 20 años y una noche (1941)
- La Maestrita de los obreros (1941)
- Dama de compañía (1940)
- The Life of Carlos Gardel (1939)
- The Caranchos of Florida (1938)
- Escala en la ciudad (1935)
