= Lauracha =

1946 film

- Film poster
- Directed by: Arturo García Buhr, Ernesto Arancibia, and Enrique Cahen Salaberry
- Written by: Hugo Mac Dougall
- Starring: Amelia Bence and Arturo García Buhr
- Cinematography: Pablo Tabernero
- Edited by: Kurt Land, Gerardo Rinaldi
- Music by: Isidro B. Maiztegui
- Production company: Pampa Film
- Release date: 11 October 1946
- Running time: 90 minutes
- Country: Argentina
- Language: Spanish

Lauracha is a 1946 Argentine melodrama film of the classical era of Argentine cinema, directed by Arturo García Buhr, Ernesto Arancibia, Antonio Ber Ciani and Enrique Cahen Salaberry, and starring Amelia Bence and García Buhr. The film was adapted for the screen by Hugo Mac Dougall, based on the Uruguayan novel of the same name by Otto Miguel Cione, which was originally published in 1906.

== Cast ==
- Amelia Bence
- Arturo García Buhr
- Nelo Cosimi
- Pilar Gómez
- Ilde Pirovano
- María Santos
- Malisa Zini

== Production ==
Problems arose during the production of the film at the Pampa Film studio which resulted in three main directors working on the film: Ernesto Arancibia, Enrique Cahen Salaberry and Arturo Garacía Buhry. The exteriors were filmed more than a year earlier by Arancibia and Cahen Salaberry, and the film was finished by Garcia Buhr, working with director Antonio Ber Ciani. It was adapted from the 1906 novel by Uruguayan author Otto Miguel Cione for the screen by Hugo Mac Dougall. Cinematographer Pablo Tabernero was brought in to shoot the picture and it was edited by Kurt Land and Gerardo Rinaldi. Isidro Maiztegui composed the score to Lauracha, and art direction was by Saulo Benavente.

== Release and reception ==
The film premiered on 11 October 1946. Noticias Gráficas noted the performances of Amelia Bence and Arturo García Buhr, while El Heraldo del Cinematografista opined that the film was an improvement on the book, while retaining a sense of style and the antiquated climate of the early 20th century period.
