= Daniel Tinayre =

Argentine filmmaker (1910–1994)

- Born: 14 September 1910; Vertheuil, France
- Died: 24 October 1994 (aged 84); Buenos Aires, Argentina
- Occupation: Film director
- Years active: 1934–1974
- Spouse: Mirtha Legrand (m. 1946)
- Children: 2

Daniel Tinayre (14 September 1910 – 24 October 1994) was an Argentine film director, screenwriter and film producer during the classical era of Argentine cinema (1930s–1950s) and the 1960s.

Moving to Buenos Aires at a young age, Tinayre directed 23 films between 1934 and 1974, such as the 1947 thriller A sangre fría (In Cold Blood) which is starred by actors such as Amelia Bence and Tito Alonso. He was also a screenwriter and producer simultaneously contributing in these areas to the films he directed in Argentine cinema.

In 1949 he directed Dance of Fire, which was later entered into the 1951 Cannes Film Festival. His 1960 film La patota was entered into the 11th Berlin International Film Festival. His 1963 film The Dragonfly Is Not an Insect was screened on the 3rd Moscow International Film Festival.

In 1969, he directed Kuma Ching; his last film was to be La Mary (1974), starring then-couple Susana Giménez and boxer Carlos Monzón.

He died in 1994. His widow was the well-known actress and television host Mirtha Legrand.

== Filmography ==
=== As director ===
- Bajo la santa Federación (1935)
- Sombras porteñas (1936)
- Mateo (1937)
- Una porteña optimista (1937)
- La hora de las sorpresas (1941)
- Vidas marcadas (1942)
- Road of HellCamino del infierno (1946)
- A sangre fría (1947)
- Danza del fuego (1948)
- Pasaporte a Río (1948)
- La vendedora de fantasías (1950)
- Deshonra (1952)
- Tren internacional (1954)
- La bestia humana (1957)
- En la ardiente oscuridad (1959)
- La patota (1960)
- El rufián (1961)
- Bajo un mismo rostro (1962)
- La cigarra no es un bicho (1963)
- Extraña ternura (1964)
- Kuma Ching (1969)
- La Mary (1974)
