= La patota (1960 film) =

- Theatrical release poster
- Directed by: Daniel Tinayre
- Written by: Eduardo Borrás
- Produced by: Daniel Tinayre; Eduardo Borrás
- Starring: Mirtha Legrand
- Cinematography: Antonio Merayo
- Edited by: Jorge Gárate
- Music by: Lucio Milena
- Distributed by: Argentina Sono Film
- Release date: 11 August 1960
- Running time: 88 minutes
- Country: Argentina
- Language: Spanish

La patota (Lunfardo for "The gang" or "The mob") is a 1960 Argentine melodrama film directed by Daniel Tinayre. The film focuses on Paulina Vidal Ugarte (Legrand), a young attractive teacher who takes a professorship at a night school located in a marginal area of Buenos Aires, where she is gang-raped by a group of students.

La patota was written by Eduardo Borrás and starred Tinayre's wife Mirtha Legrand. The film was in competition for the Golden Bear at the 11th Berlin International Film Festival, where Tinayre was given the C.I.D.A.L.C. Award. Now considered a modern movie classic, La patota was remade as Paulina by director Santiago Mitre in 2015, with Dolores Fonzi playing the main role.

== Cast ==
In alphabetical order

- Miguel Beleirén - Alumno
- André Braillard - Alumno
- Alfonso De Grazia - Hombre en fiesta de graduación
- Rafael Diserio - Médico
- Patricio Farrell - Tito
- Haydeé Larroca - Profesora 1
- María Cristina Laurenz - Mujer en fiesta de graduación
- Carmen Llambí - Telefonista
- Juan Longobuco - Alumno
- Gaston Marchetto - Alumno Morales
- Susana Mayo - Enfermera
- Alberto Puig - Alumno
- Julio C. Quino - Raúl
- Rogelio Romano - Policia
- Sara Suter - Profesora 2
- Isidro Fernán Valdez - Don Anselmo
- Néstor Zabrini - Alumno

== Accolades ==
List of awards and nominations
Award	Category	Recipients	Result
11th Berlin International Film Festival	Golden Bear	La patota	Nominated
11th Berlin International Film Festival	C.I.D.A.L.C. Award	La patota	Won
Argentine Film Critics Association	Best Supporting Actor	Alberto Argibay	Won
