= The Kids Grow Up =

- Directed by: Carlos Hugo Christensen
- Written by: Carlos Hugo Christensen, Carlos Damel, Camilo Darthés, Francisco Oyarzábal, Julio Porter
- Cinematography: Alfredo Traverso
- Edited by: A. Rampoldi
- Music by: George Andreani
- Production company: Lumiton
- Release date: 29 July 1942
- Running time: 78 minutes
- Country: Argentina
- Language: Spanish

The Kids Grow Up (Spanish: Los chicos crecen) is a 1942 Argentine melodrama film of the Golden Age of Argentine cinema, directed and co-written by Carlos Hugo Christensen and starring Arturo García Buhr, Santiago Gómez Cou and María Duval. At the 1943 Argentine Film Critics Association Awards, Arturo García Buhr won the Silver Condor Award for Best Actor for his performance in the film.

== Cast ==
- Arturo García Buhr
- Santiago Gómez Cou
- María Duval
- Pepita Serrador
- Maruja Gil Quesada
- Miguel Gómez Bao
- Aurelia Ferrer
- Mariana Martí
- Tito Alonso
- Arturo Arcari
