= Gustavo Monje =

Argentine stage actor and director (born 1971)

Gustavo Monje (born 8 June 1971) is an Argentine stage actor and director. He has also had minor roles in films like Burnt Money (2000) and The Notice of the Day (2001), but his work is mainly on stage. In 2005 he appeared in Stephanie.
