= Vidas marcadas =

- Directed by: Daniel Tinayre
- Written by: Arturo S. Mom
- Starring: Mecha Ortiz, George Rigaud, Sebastián Chiola
- Release date: 1942
- Country: Argentina
- Language: Spanish

Vidas marcadas is a 1942 Argentine film of the Golden Age of Argentine cinema.

== Cast ==
- Mecha Ortiz as Malena
- George Rigaud
- Sebastián Chiola
- Roberto Fugazot
- Haydeé Larroca
- Alberto Terrones
- Cayetano Biondo
