= Dance of Fire (film) =

- Directed by: Daniel Tinayre
- Written by: André Legrand; Daniel Tinayre; Alejandro Verbitzky; Emilio Villalba Welsh
- Starring: Amelia Bence
- Cinematography: Humberto Peruzzi
- Edited by: José Serra
- Release date: December 27, 1949
- Running time: 97 minutes
- Country: Argentina
- Language: Spanish

Dance of Fire (Spanish: La Danza del fuego) is a 1949 Argentine drama film directed by Daniel Tinayre during the classical era of Argentine cinema. It was entered into the 1951 Cannes Film Festival.

== Cast ==
- Amelia Bence
- Francisco de Paula
- Enrique Diosdado
- Alberto Closas
- Floren Delbene
- Otto Sirgo
- Blanca Tapia
- Agustín Barrios
- Norma Key
- Alberto Quiles
- Francisco Audenino
- Percival Murray
- Alberto Barcel
