= En el viejo Buenos Aires =

- Directed by: Antonio Momplet
- Production company: Estudios San Miguel
- Release date: 1942
- Country: Argentina
- Language: Spanish

"En el viejo Buenos Aires" (transl. In old Buenos Aires) is a 1942 Argentine film directed by Antonio Momplet during the Golden Age of Argentine cinema.

== Cast ==
- Luis Aldás
- Amelia Bence
- Angel Boffa
- Rosa Catá
- Orestes Caviglia
- Alberto Contreras
- Raúl del Valle
