= Mr. and Mrs. Juan Lamaglia =

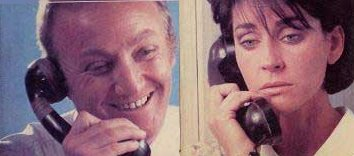
- Juan Lamaglia and Sra Lamaglia
- Directed by: Raúl de la Torre
- Written by: Héctor Grossi; Raúl de la Torre
- Starring: José Soriano; Julia von Grolman
- Cinematography: Juan José Stagnaro
- Edited by: Óscar Souto; Sergio Zottola
- Music by: Roberto Lar
- Release date: 1970
- Running time: 88 mins
- Country: Argentina
- Language: Spanish

Mr. and Mrs. Juan Lamaglia (Spanish:Juan Lamaglia y señora) is a 1970 Argentine film written by Héctor Grossi and Raúl de la Torre and directed by Raúl de la Torre.

It was released in Argentina on April 28, 1970.

Raúl de la Torre was awarded the Special Jury Award at the 1970 Mar del Plata Film Festival and the film itself won the Silver Condor for Best Film (Mejor Película) at the 1971 Argentine Film Critics Association Awards.

== Cast ==
- José Soriano as Juan Lamaglia
- Julia von Grolman as Señora Lamaglia
