= El forastero =

El Forastero
- Directed by: Antonio Ber Ciani
- Written by: Rogelio Cordone; Carlos Goicochea
- Release date: 1937
- Running time: 84 minute
- Country: Argentina
- Language: Spanish

El forastero is a 1937 Argentine film directed by Antonio Ber Ciani during the Golden Age of Argentine cinema.

== Cast ==
- Ángel Magaña
- Enrique Muiño
- Elías Alippi
- Rosa Contreras
