= Un guapo del 900 (1960 film) =

Un Guapo del '900
- Directed by: Leopoldo Torre Nilsson
- Release date: 17 August 1960
- Country: Argentina
- Language: Spanish

Un Guapo del '900 is a 1960 Argentine drama film directed by Leopoldo Torre Nilsson.

== Cast ==
- Alfredo Alcón as Ecuménico López
- Arturo García Buhr as Alejo Garay
- Elida Gay Palmer as Edelmira Carranza de Garay
- Lydia Lamaison as Doña Natividad
- Duilio Marzio as Clemente Ordóñez
- Catalina Mora de Goldenhorn Betbeder as Doña Cata
- Eduardo Jorge Goldenhorn as Don Eduardo
- Susana Mayo
- Beto Gianola
- Eduardo Foglizzio
- Ovidio Fuentes
- Mario Rolla
- Walter Soubrie
- Oscar Matarrese
- Francisco Iribarren
