= Crimen a las tres =

- Directed by: Luis Saslavsky
- Written by: Luis Saslavsky
- Produced by: Luis Saslavsky
- Starring: Blanca de Castejón
- Cinematography: John Alton
- Music by: Hector Lagna Fietta
- Release date: 1935
- Country: Argentina
- Language: Spanish

Crimen a las tres is a 1935 Argentine crime film from the Golden Age of Argentine cinema. It was directed and written by Luis Saslavsky, and premiered on August 22, 1935, starring Blanca de Castejón and Héctor Cataruzza.

== Main cast ==
- Blanca de Castejón
- Eduardo Berri
- Malena Bravo
- Héctor Cataruzza
- Augusto Codecá
- Ana May
