= Helena Cortesina =

Spanish film director and actress (1903–1984)

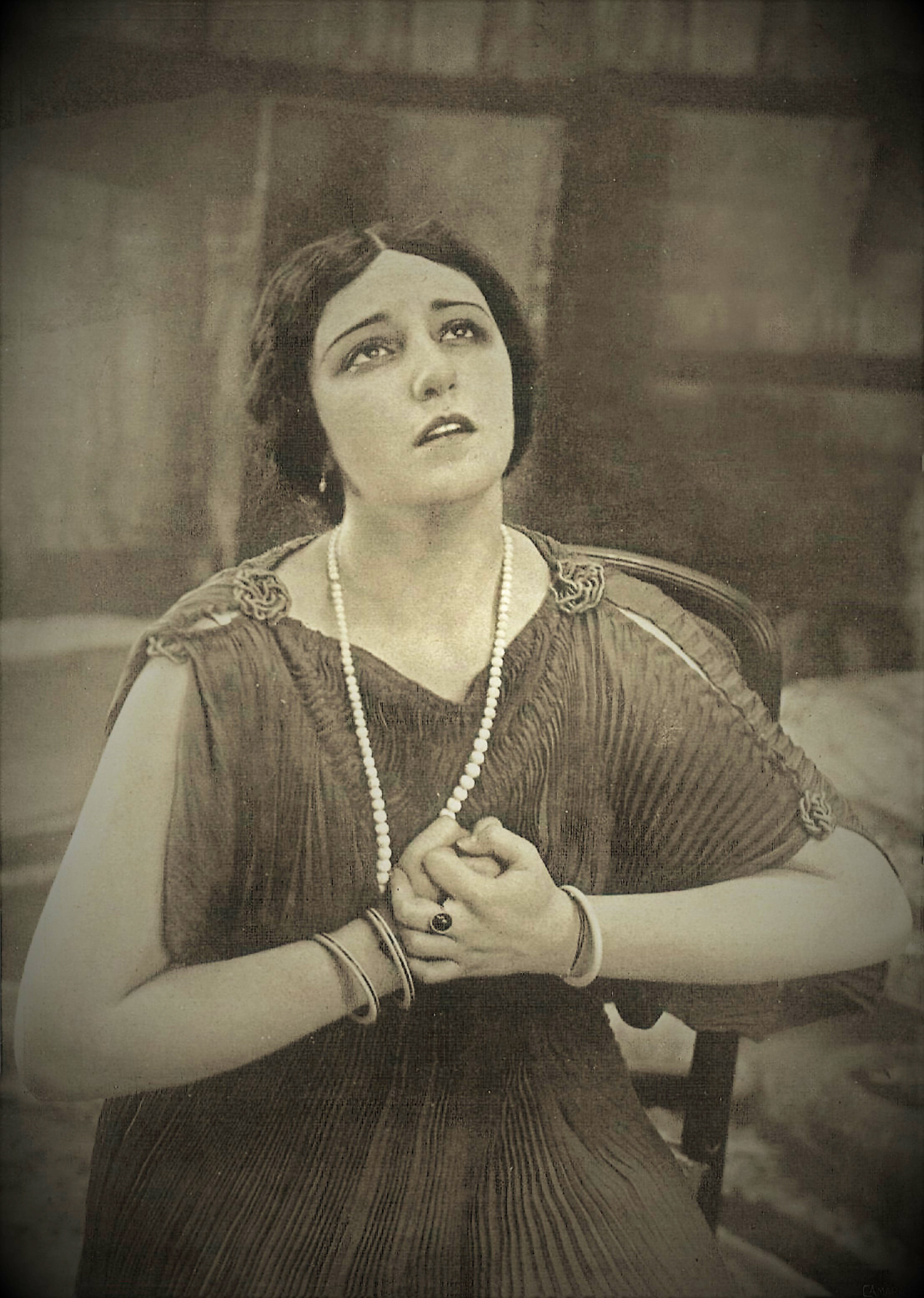
- Born: Elena Cortés Altabas; 17 July 1903; Valencia (Spain)
- Died: 7 March 1984 (aged 80); Buenos Aires (Argentina)
- Occupation: Actor, film director, film producer, dancer

Helena Cortesina (17 July 1903 — 7 March 1984), also known as Elena Cortesina or Elena Manuela Dolores Cortés Altabas, was a Spanish film director, actor, producer, and theatrical entrepreneur. She directed and produced the first known film by a Spanish woman, Flor de España o la leyenda de un torero (1921), which has since been lost. She acted in the film alongside her sisters, Ofelia and Angélica, who were collectively referred to as the Hermanas Cortesina.

== Early life and career ==
She began her career as a dancer, performing to songs by Spanish composers, with an aesthetic heavily influenced by Greek art. Cortesina has been identified as one of the models for the 1917 painting Danzarinas griegas, by the painter Joaquin Sorolla y Bastida. She later founded a production company, Cortesina Films, in Madrid in 1921. The direction and screenwriting of Flor de España was long attributed to priest and playwright José María Granada, but this is contradicted by reviews that indicate that Cortesina directed while Granada only edited the script.

== Escape to Buenos Aires ==
In 1936, at the beginning of the Spanish Civil War, Cortesina joined the Alliance of Antifascist Intellectuals for the Defense of Culture. In order to escape fascism, she and her son Juan Manuel Fontanals, one of two children she had with stage designer Manuel Fontanals, escaped to Buenos Aires, Argentina, in 1937. There, she established a theater company with Andrés Mejuto that produced a number of Spanish plays. She continued to act in films, including 1945's La dama duende, based on a 17th-century play by Pedro Calderón de la Barca.
