= Eva Franco =

Argentine actress

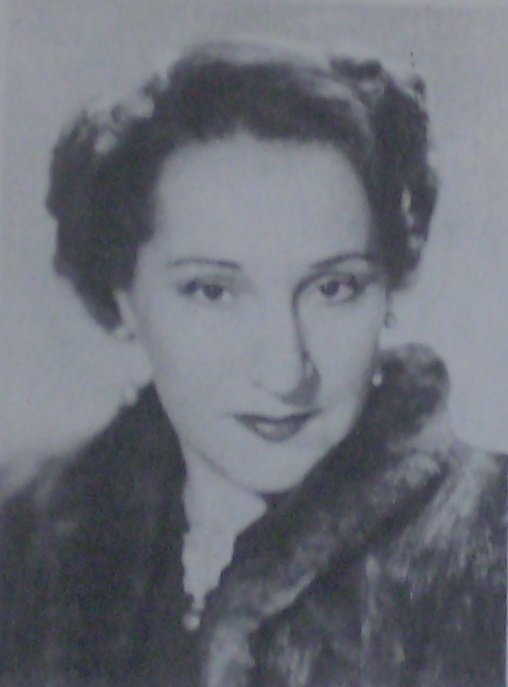
- Born: 29 June 1906; Buenos Aires, Argentina
- Died: 28 March 1999 (aged 92); Mar del Plata, Argentina
- Occupation: Actress
- Years active: 1916-1993 (film)

Eva Franco (1906–1999) was an Argentine stage, film and television actress.

== Selected filmography ==
- Medio millón por una mujer (1940)
- Grandma (1979)
- Count to Ten (1985)

== Bibliography ==
- Finkielman, Jorge. The Film Industry in Argentina: An Illustrated Cultural History. McFarland, 24 Dec 2003.
