= Pedro López Lagar =

Argentine actor (1899–1977)

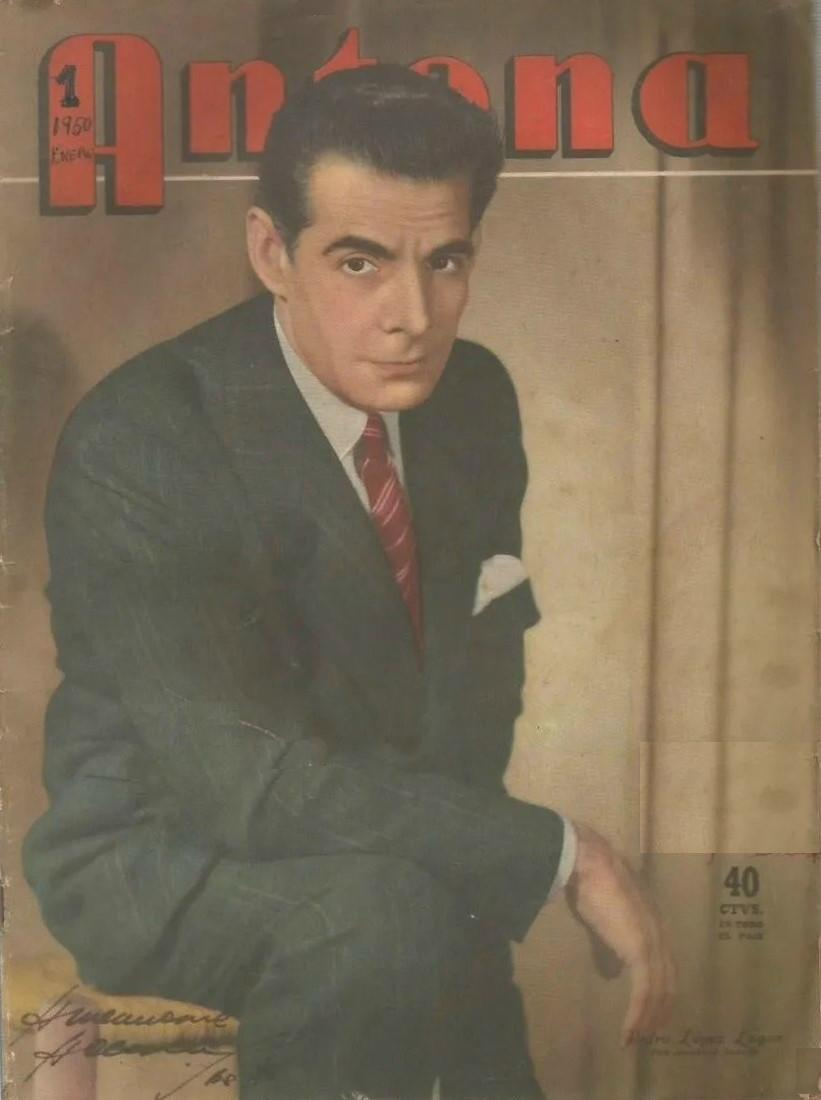
- Pedro López Lagar on the cover of the magazine Antena TV in 1950
- Born: 18 June 1899; Madrid, Spain
- Died: 21 August 1977 (aged 78); Buenos Aires, Argentina
- Occupation: Actor

Pedro López Lagar (18 June 1899, in Madrid – 21 August 1977, in Buenos Aires) was a Spanish-born Argentine film actor, notable for his work during the Golden Age of Argentine cinema in the 1940s and 1950s.

== Career ==
Although born in Madrid he moved to Argentina as a young man and began acting in films in 1938. He starred with Enrique Borrás and Margarita Xirgu in Alejandro Casona's La sirena varada, released in 1934. He made some 20 film appearances but his career was at its peak in the mid to late 1940s, with Lopez appearing in Albéniz in 1946 and A sangre fría in 1947 in which he starred alongside Tito Alonso and Amelia Bence.

== Selected filmography ==
- Son cartas de amor (1943)
- Two Angels and a Sinner (1945)
- Road of Hell (1946)
- Suburb (1951)
- The Boy and the Fog (1953)
