= Luis Saslavsky =

Argentine film director

Luis Saslavsky (April 21, 1903 – March 20, 1995) was an Argentine film director, screenwriter and film producer, notable for his work during the classical era of Argentine cinema.

== Personal life ==
Saskavsky was born in Rosario, Santa Fe, Argentina, to a Jewish family.

== Career ==
He directed and wrote over 40 films between 1931 and 1979. He directed films such as Crimen a las tres in 1935 and wrote for films such as Allá en el Norte in 1973. He retired from the industry in 1979.

== Death ==
He died in Buenos Aires, aged 91.

== Filmography ==
- La fuga (1937)
- Black Crown
- Closed Door (1939)
- The House of Memories
- Démoniaque
- Ashes to the Wind (1942)
- Man to Man Talk
- Crimen a las tres
- The Phantom Lady (1945)
- Road of Hell (1946)
- Passport to Rio (1948)
- Story of a Bad Woman (1948)
- Stain in the Snow (1954)
- The She-Wolves (1957)
- This Desired Body (1959)
- The Balcony of the Moon (1962)
