= List of Argentine films of 1948 =

A list of films produced in Argentina in 1948:

Argentine films of 1948
Title	Director	Release	Genre
A - D
Alguien se acerca	Piero Ballerini	unreleased	
Al marido hay que seguirlo	Augusto César Vatteone	14 September	
Argentina revolucionaria	Lucio Berto	6 May	
Así te deseo	Belisario García Villar	18 February	
El barco sale a las diez	Francisco Mugica	28 April	
La Calle grita	Lucas Demare	14 September	
El cantor del pueblo	Antonio Ber Ciani	23 January	
La Caraba	Julio Saraceni	18 March	
Compañeros de aventuras	Edmundo Haslop	10 June	
Crimen entre bastidores	Francisco Peck		
Cuidado con las imitaciones	Luis Bayón Herrera	19 May	
La Dama del collar	Luis Mottura	8 July	
Dios se lo pague	Luis César Amadori	11 March	
Don Bildigerno de Pago Milagro	Antonio Ber Ciani	10 October	
E - M
Emigrantes	Aldo Fabrizi	10 November	
La gran tentación	Ernesto Arancibia	9 December	
La hostería del caballito blanco	Benito Perojo	15 April	
Hoy cumple años mamá	Ignacio Domínguez Riera	14 July	
Juan Moreira	Luis José Moglia Barth	11 February	
La locura de don Juan	Mario C. Lugones	16 June	
Maridos modernos	Luis Bayón Herrera	19 September	
María de los Ángeles	Ernesto Arancibia	13 February	
Mis cinco hijos	Orestes Caviglia and Bernardo Spoliansky	2 September	
N - P
La muerte camina en la lluvia	Carlos Hugo Christensen	7 September	
La novia de la Marina	Benito Perojo	20 October	
Novio, marido y amante	Mario C. Lugones	22 January	
Passport to Rio	Daniel Tinayre	9 September	
Pelota de trapo	Leopoldo Torres Ríos	10 August	
Pobre mi madre querida	Homero Manzi and Ralph Pappier	28 April	
Por ellos... todo	Carlos Schlieper	24 May	
Porteña de corazón	Manuel Romero	9 April	
Los pueblos dormidos	Leo Fleider		Documentary
Los pulpos	Carlos Hugo Christensen	17 March	
Q - Z
Recuerdos de un ángel	Enrique Cahen Salaberry	26 August	
Rodríguez, supernumerario	Enrique Cahen Salaberry	26 May	
La Rubia Mireya	Manuel Romero	8 October	
Los secretos del buzón	Catrano Catrani	22 April	
La Secta del trébol	Mario Soffici	21 July	
La serpiente de cascabel	Carlos Schlieper	17 March	
Story of a Bad Woman	Luis Saslavsky	18 May	
Su íntimo secreto	Julio Irigoyen	15 May	
El tambor de Tacuarí	Carlos Borcosque	6 July	
El tango vuelve a París	Manuel Romero	16 January	
Tierra del Fuego	Mario Soffici	30 November	
Tierras hechizadas	Emilio Guerineau	unreleased	
Una Atrevida aventurita	Carlos Hugo Christensen	9 June	

== External links and references ==
- Argentine films of 1948 at the Internet Movie Database
