= María Duval (Argentine actress) =

Argentine actress (1926–2022)

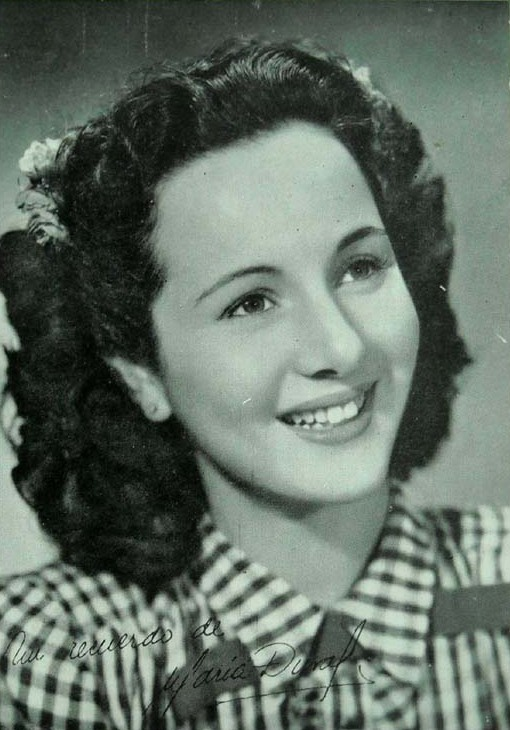
- Born: María Mogilevsky; 17 May 1926; Bahía Blanca, Argentina
- Died: 10 May 2022 (aged 95); Buenos Aires, Argentina
- Occupation: Actress
- Years active: 1940–1949
- Spouse: José Grosman (1948–2010)

María Duval (born María Mogilevsky; 17 May 1926 – 10 May 2022) was an Argentine actress, considered one of the most representative performers of the Golden Age of Argentine cinema. She made 21 films until her retirement in 1949, shortly after getting married the previous year.

== Career ==
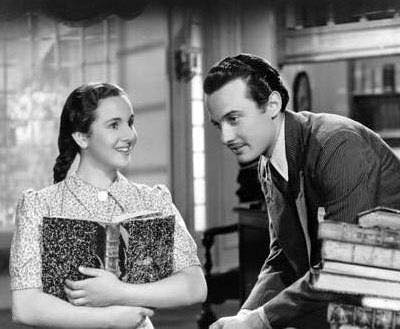
Duval and Ricardo Passano in Casi un sueño (1943)

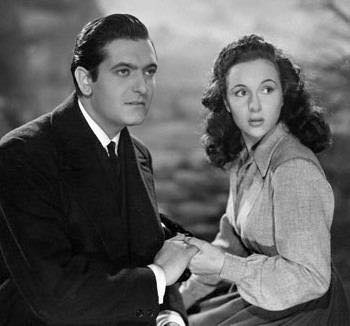
Duval and Alberto Closas in La honra de los hombres (1946)

After winning a reading contest, she left her hometown, accompanied by her father, and traveled to Buenos Aires to participate in a contest organized by the prestigious journalist Chas de Cruz to be part of the cast of Canción de cuna (1941), by Gregorio Martínez Sierra. In the same year she took part in Brother Joe with Pepe Arias for Argentina Sono Film.

Carlos Hugo Christensen directed her in Sixteen (1943), for Lumiton. Called by Estudios San Miguel, she starred alongside Ángel Magaña in Cuando florezca el naranjo, directed by Alberto de Zavalía. In 1945 she starred alongside Elina Colomer in Lost Kisses, and in 1946 she appeared in The Three Rats, where he formed a trio with Amelia Bence and Mecha Ortiz; the plot recounted the difficult story of three sisters without parents.

In 1948 she married wool industrialist José Grosman (22 December 1917 – 22 November 2010), and shortly afterward retired from show business. For some time after her retirement, her only public appearances were when performing charity work for the Israelite Hospital. While she had stopped attending film festivals, in 1981 she agreed to receive the Pathé Camera Award from the National Cinema Museum. In 1995 she received the San Gabriel Award for her career as a benchmark for comedy in the cinema. In 2001, the Cronistas de Cine also awarded her a Silver Condor Award for her career and she was given a standing ovation by those present. At the 16th Edition of the Mar del Plata International Film Festival (2001) she was honored in the "Women and cinema" section. The Argentine Senate awarded her a diploma for her brilliant artistic career, and she received the Podestá Award in 2003. In 2007 she was declared an Illustrious Citizen of the City of Bahía Blanca.

In 2014, she conducted an interview for the Incaa TV program En foco in which she covered her entire artistic career.

She died at her home in the Buenos Aires neighbourhood of Belgrano, on 10 May 2022, at the age of 95.

== Filmography ==
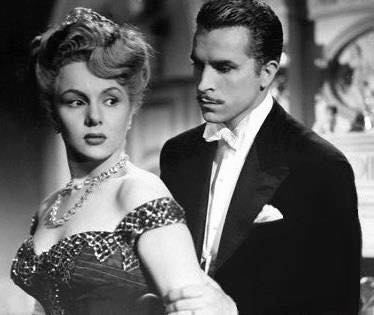
Duval and Fernando Lamas in Story of a Bad Woman (1948)

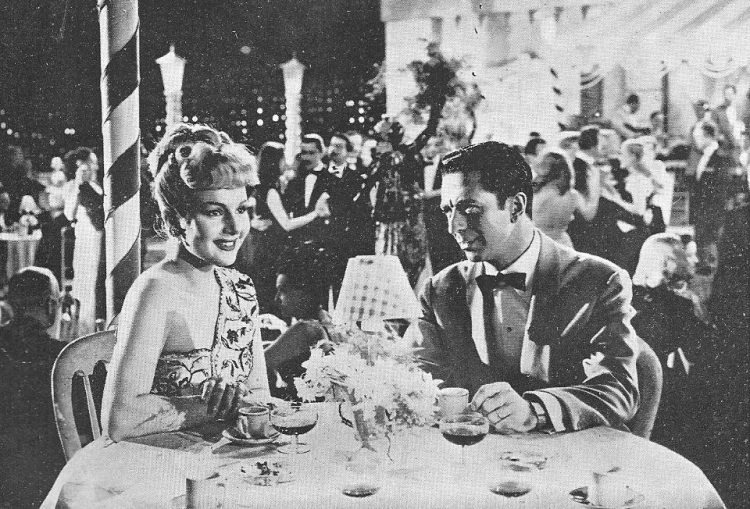
Duval and Juan Carlos Thorry in Cita en las estrellas (1949)

- Canción de cuna (1941)
- Brother Joe (1941)
- The Kids Grow Up (1942)
- Ashes to the Wind (1942)
- Cuando florezca el naranjo (1943)
- Casi un sueño (1943)
- Sixteen (1943)
- Dark Valley (1945)
- Lost Kisses (1945)
- La honra de los hombres (1946)
- The Three Rats (1946)
- La senda oscura (1947)
- Story of a Bad Woman (1948)
- La serpiente de cascabel (1948)
- Cita en las estrellas (1949)
- El extraño caso de la mujer asesinada (1949)
