= María Aurelia Bisutti =

Argentine actress

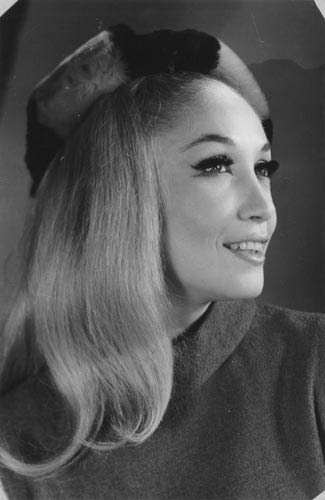
- Born: June 20, 1930; Buenos Aires, Argentina
- Died: April 12, 2010 (aged 79); Ingeniero Maschwitz, Escobar, Buenos Aires province, Argentina
- Occupation: Actress
- Years active: 1948–1993

María Aurelia Bisutti (June 20, 1930 – April 12, 2010) was an Argentine film and TV actress, with over 50 Argentine cinema and television credits between 1948 and 1993, as well as numerous roles in the theatre.

== Biography ==
Born in Buenos Aires, she received her first film roles in 1948 through a radio audition hosted by a popular variety show of the time, Diario del cine, and first worked with directors Benito Perojo and Carlos Schlieper. Bisutti earned her first television role in a 1960 documentary on the lives of Paul Gauguin and Edgar Degas. She was given the lead role in Pedro Escudero's A puerta cerrada (1962), and starred in period piece filmmaker Leopoldo Torre Nilsson's Martín Fierro (1968). Bisutti also became well known on the radio, starring in a number of soap operas.

She received a Martín Fierro Award for lifetime achievement in 1999. She continued to work on the airwaves, starring in the public radio series, Las dos carátulas, from 2002.

== Filmography ==
- 1997: De cara al cielo (Enrique Dawi)
- 1981: Seis pasajes al infierno (Fernando Siro)
- 1980: El diablo metió la pata (Carlos Rinaldi)
- 1975: El inquisidor (Bernardo Arias)
- 1976: Allá donde muere el viento (Fernando Siro)
- 1977: La nueva cigarra (Fernando Siro)
- 1972: Nino (Federico Curiel)
- 1970: Con alma y vida (David José Kohon)
- 1969: Kuma Ching (dir. Daniel Tinayre)
- 1968: Martín Fierro (Leopoldo Torre Nilsson)
- 1968: El derecho a la felicidad (Carlos Rinaldi)
- 1968: Lo prohibido está de moda (Fernando Siro)
- 1966: Hotel alojamiento (Fernando Ayala)
- 1965: Canuto Cañete, detective privado (Leo Fleider)
- 1963: La calesita (Hugo del Carril)
- 1962: A puerta cerrada (Pedro Escudero)
- 1961: Amorina (Hugo del Carril)
- 1961: Libertad bajo palabra (Alfredo Bettamín)
- 1960: Los de la mesa 10 (Simón Feldman)
- 1960: Culpable (Hugo del Carril)
- 1960: Plaza Huincul (Pozo Uno) (Lucas Demare)
- 1958: Alto Paraná (Catrano Catrani)
- 1957: Historia de una carta (Julio Porter)
- 1956: Sangre y acero (Lucas Demare)
- 1954: Los ojos llenos de amor (Carlos Schlieper)
- 1948: White Horse Inn (Benito Perojo)
- 1948: La serpiente de cascabel (Carlos Schlieper)
