= Deseo =

Deseo (Spanish for "wish" or "desire"), or El Deseo may also refer to:

== People ==
- Csaba Deseo, violinist

== Film and television ==
- Deseo (2002 film), directed by Gerardo Vera
- Deseo (2008 film), starring Edith González
- Deseos, 1977 film starring Elpidia Carrillo
- El Deseo (1944 film), directed by Carlos Schlieper
- El Deseo (1948 film), directed by Chano Urueta
- El Deseo S.A., film production company owned by Spanish film producers the Almodóvar brothers

== Music ==
=== Albums ===
- Deseo, by Anja Schneider and Lee Van Dowski, 2009
- Deseo, by Franco Simone, 2006
- Deseo, by Lorena Rojas, 2006
- Deseo, by Pastora Soler
- Deseo, soundtrack by Stephen Warbeck
- Deseo (Jon Anderson album)
- Deseo (Paulina Rubio album), 2018
- Deseos (Mariem Hassan album)
- Deseos, by Cuban band Arte Mixto, 1996
- Deseo Carnal, by Alaska y Dinarama

=== Songs ===
- "Deseo", by Alex Rivera
- "Deseo", by Deborah Anderson, Jon Anderson and Cecilia Toussaint
- "Deseo", by Grupo Montéz de Durango
- "Deseo", by Jorge Drexler
- "Deseo", by Luis Eduardo Aute
- "Deseo", by Maelo Ruiz
- "Deseo", by Mónica Naranjo, later covered by Myriam Hernández
- "Deseo", by Pedro Guerra
- "Deseo", by Tony Vega
- "Deseo [Salsa Club Mix]", by Latin Blood and Joey Negro
- "Deseos", by Eddie Santiago from Soy el Mismo
- "Deseos", by Mariana Ochoa from Yo Soy

== See also ==
- Así te deseo, 1948 film
- "Mi Deseo", a song by Marco Antonio Solís
- "Tres Deseos", a song by Gloria Estefan
