= The Whole Year is Christmas =

- Directed by: Román Viñoly Barreto
- Written by: Horacio S. Meyrialle
- Produced by: Argentina Sono Film
- Edited by: Jorge Gárate
- Release date: 1960
- Running time: 80 minutes
- Country: Argentina
- Language: Spanish

The Whole Year is Christmas (Spanish: Todo el año es Navidad) is a 1960 Argentine film.

== Cast ==
- Raúl Rossi as Santa Claus
- Olga Zubarry as Esther (episode "Una mujer")
- Carlos Estrada as Enrique (episode "Una mujer")
- Nelly Meden as Marta (episode "El angelito")
- Leonardo Favio as Armando Echagüe / Roberto Echagüe (episode "El hermano")
- Ricardo Castro Ríos as Federico (episode "El angelito")
- Mabel Karr as Carmen (episode "Cobardía")
- Enrique Guarnero as Don Servando (episode "Violencia")
- Elcira Olivera Garcés
- Pepita Serrador as Señora Echagüe (episode "El hermano")
- Narciso Ibáñez Serrador as Carmelo (episode "Cobardía")
- Oscar Orlegui as Angelito (episode "El angelito")
- Juan Carlos Altavista as Bromista (episode "Cobardía")
