= This Earth Is Mine =

This Earth Is Mine can refer to:

- This Earth Is Mine (1959 film), a 1959 American film
- This Earth Is Mine (1961 film), a 1961 Argentine film
