= La cumparsita (disambiguation) =

"La cumparsita" is a 1916 tango by Gerardo Matos Rodríguez.

- La cumparsita (es), a 1947 Argentine film by Antonio Momplet.
- La cumparsita (es), a 1961 Argentine film by Enrique Carreras.
