= El Último perro =

1956 film

- Film poster
- Directed by: Lucas Demare
- Written by: Lucas Demare; Guillermo House; Sergio Leonardo
- Produced by: Enrique Faustin; Luis Giudici; Juan Pelich
- Starring: Domingo Sapelli
- Cinematography: Humberto Peruzzi
- Edited by: Nello Melli
- Release date: 1956
- Running time: 95 minutes
- Country: Argentina
- Language: Spanish

El Último perro is a 1956 Argentine film directed by Lucas Demare. It was entered into the 1956 Cannes Film Festival.

== Cast ==
- Domingo Sapelli - Don Facundo
- Hugo del Carril - Nicasio
- Rosa Catá - Dona Juana
- Nelly Panizza - Martina
- Gloria Ferrandiz - Dona Fe
- Nelly Meden - Maria Fabiana
- Mario Passano - El Nato
- Jacinto Herrera - Cantalicio
- Ana Casares - Julia
