= Madame Petit =

Spanish brothel

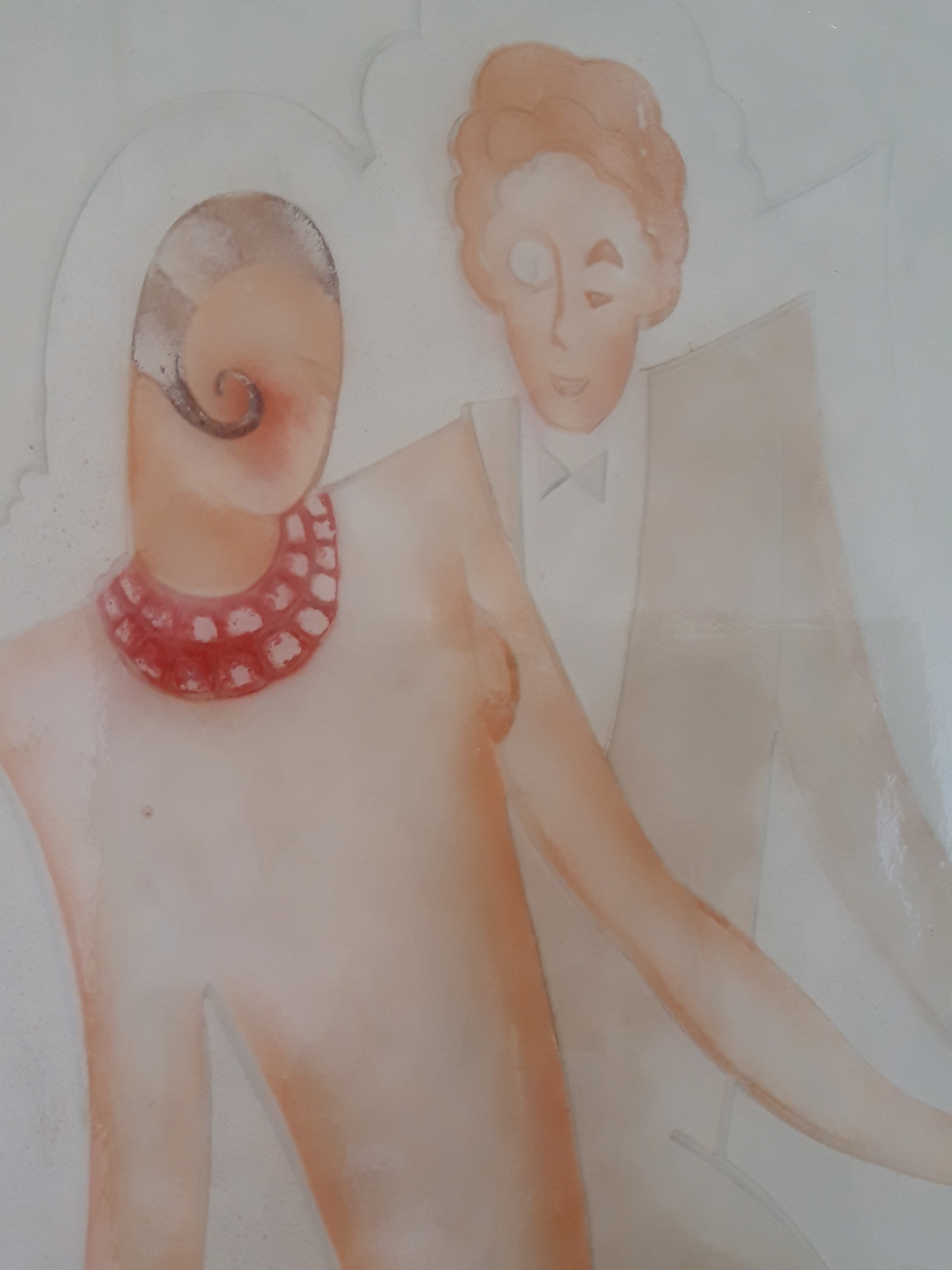
- One of the stained glass panels that decorated the brothel. MUHBA Museum of History of Barcelona

- Location in Barcelona
- Address: 6 Arc del Teatre
- Location: Barcelona, Spain
- Coordinates: 41.3780582°N 2.172652°E
- Type: Brothel

Construction
- Opened: 1888
- Closed: 1956
- Demolished: 1990s

Madame Petit was the most luxurious and probably the most famous brothel in the city of Barcelona. Its origins date back to the 1888 Barcelona Universal Exposition and it was at its peak around the time of World War I until the Spanish Civil War. It was located in the historic Barrio Chino area of Barcelona, at the entrance of Carrer Arc del Teatre, specifically at number 6.

In the same street, Carrer Arc del Teatre, in the section to the corner of the Carrer Migdia (now Avinguda de les Drassanes), there were several brothels. The area was well known for it brothels and referred to as de quatre cantons.

== History ==
The brothel opened around 1888 when the Universal Exhibition brought a lot of visitors to Barcelona. In the following year it was recorded by the Sección Especial de Higiene (Special Section of Hygiene) for its non-compliance with the regulations for bars. Many of the women there were foreign, especially French, fleeing from the First World War, because Barcelona, like the rest of Spain, was neutral during the war. There were people from all over the Port who promoted this business especially during the years that war broke out. Other prostitutes were Germans, Arabs and Poles and numbered about 100. There was one Cuban who, because of her dark colouring, had patrons queuing to see her.

There is no evidence to show the existence of a "Madame Petit" the French madame who supposedly ran the brothel initially. Francisco Madrid names Josep Urgarte as running the brothel in his 1926 book Sangre en Atarazanas.

== Facilities ==
The decorations of the Madame Petit brothel were luxurious and included columns with engraved nude figures and a ceiling painted with sexual motifs. There were also stained glass windows decorated with exotic dancers and other suitable subjects, which are preserved in the Barcelona City History Museum. There was also a pornographic cinema. In 1910 a restaurant was added.

The brothel catered for most sexual fantasies. A Polish mother and daughter catered to those who enjoyed sado-masochism. A goat and a lamb catered for those with bestiality tendencies. Trios were also catered for. One room has a bed big enough for six people, and another contained a coffin.

The brothel was known for its hygiene. Towels and bedding were changed after every client and it was the first building in the city to have bidets installed.

== Closure ==
Madame Petit declined after the Civil War and eventually closed in 1956, following the law abolishing prostitution. By that time, the Madame Petit had already lost most of its former splendour. The building became a pension called "Pensión Los Arcos", which also functioned as a brothel, after the closure of Madame Petit. It was demolished in the 1990s as part of an urban regeneration scheme in El Raval. As of 2019, the lot still remains empty.

== Bibliography ==
- Ainaud, Josep Maria; Font, Joan Villarroya i (2005). Barcelona años treinta (in Spanish). Angle Editorial.
- Bellmunt, Domènec de; Farran, Francesc Canosa (2009). La Barcelona pecadora: els reportatges de l'àngel bohemi (in Catalan). A Contra Vent. ISBN 9788493676520.
- Escamilla, David (2008). La Barcelona del Vent (in Catalan). Ediciones Robinbook. ISBN 9788493601409.
- Madrid, Francisco (1926). Sangre en Atarazanas (in Spanish). Ediciones de la Flecha.
- Roglan, Joaquim; Llanas, Mar; Garcia, Enric; Vicens, Joan (2003). La Barcelona erótica (in Spanish). Angle. ISBN 9788496103290.
- Villar, Paco (1997). Historia y leyenda del Barrio Chino, 1900-1992: crónica y documentos de los bajos fondos de Barcelona (in Spanish). La Campana. ISBN 9788488791320.
- "Ruta per la Barcelona de la Gran Guerra". Sàpiens (in Catalan) (134). September 2013.
