= Cita en las estrellas =

- Theatrical release poster
- Directed by: Carlos Schlieper
- Written by: Alejandro Verbitzky; Emilio Villalba Welsh
- Produced by: Kurt Land
- Starring: María Duval; Juan Carlos Thorry
- Cinematography: Pablo Cabernero
- Edited by: Gerardo Rinaldi; Antonio Ripoll
- Music by: Víctor Slister; Raúl Sánchez Reynoso
- Production company: Emelco
- Release date: January 13, 1949
- Running time: 83 minutes
- Country: Argentina
- Language: Spanish

Cita en las estrellas (Spanish pronunciation: [ˈsita en las esˈtɾeʝas]; Spanish for "Date in the stars") is a 1949 Argentine fantasy screwball comedy film of the classical era of Argentine cinema, directed by Carlos Schlieper, and starring María Duval and Juan Carlos Thorry. It was produced by Kurt Land and released by film studio Emelco. Set in Mar del Plata, the film tells the story of two lovers that are separated by death, and their desperate attempts to reunite in Heaven. The screenplay was written by Alejandro Verbitzky and Emilio Villalba Welsh.

== Plot ==
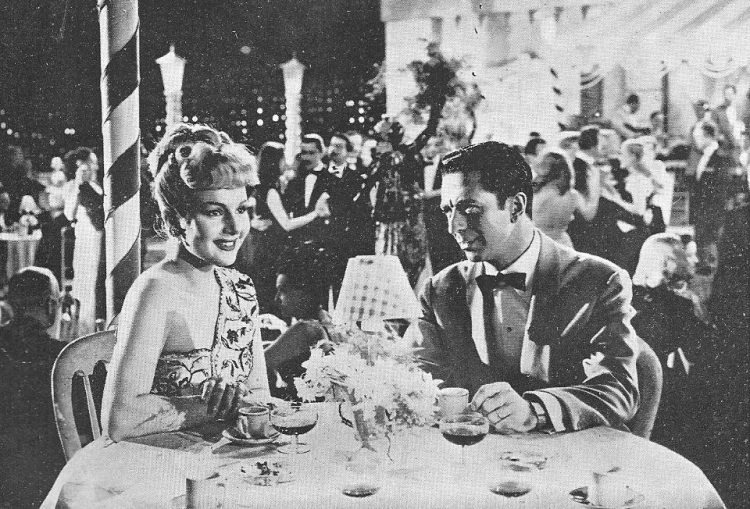
Alicia (María Duval) and Luis (Juan Carlos Thorry), having dinner at the beginning of the film.

Alicia returns from Paris to the city of Mar del Plata, where she is reunited with her childhood friend and youth lover, Luis. They go out to dinner along with their respective spouses: Julio, a close friend of Luis, and Carmen. Upon seeing each other again, Alicia and Luis confess that they are still in love with each other and, the following night, meet privately and agree to just be friends. While returning from this meeting, they suffer a car accident that causes the death of Luis and leaves Alicia in a delicate state. While being operated by Luis' uncle, a renowned doctor, Alicia loses her life and arrives in Heaven, where she reunites with Luis. Since their marriages on Earth have ended by their deaths, they marry each other in Heaven. However, the doctor manages to revive Alicia and she ends up surviving the operation, returning to her earthly life.

Following her recovery, Alicia refuses to recognize Julio as her husband, insisting that she had married Luis in Heaven. She wants to die in order to meet Luis again, although she cannot commit suicide as it would prevent her from entering Heaven. Alicia then decides to put herself in risky situations, seeking to suffer a fatal accident. Meanwhile, Luis discovers that natural accidents are controlled from Heaven, and sends a landslide while Alicia and Julio are climbing a mountain. Luis does not fulfill his mission, and only causes the death of Julio, with whom he argues in Heaven about who is Alicia's legitimate husband. Alicia visits a spiritist medium and manages to communicate with Luis, telling him that they will soon meet again.

After learning that Alicia was taking a flight to Paris alongside Carmen, Luis sends another accident. However, Alicia decides not to take the plane at the last minute, and Carmen arrives in Heaven instead. Seeking to return to Earth, Luis breaks the rules of Heaven but only manages to be punished with temporary isolation. A longing Alicia approaches the seaside, hoping that fate will lead her to death. While standing on the waterfront street, she is almost run over by Jorge Rigaud, a famous actor. Alicia reacts enthusiastically when she sees that the man physically resembles Luis, says the same compliments, and even has the same favorite song as him. In Heaven, Carmen and Julio celebrate while Luis screams in despair as they watch Alicia get into Jorge's car and drive away.

== Cast ==
- María Duval as Alicia
- Juan Carlos Thorry as Luis
- Osvaldo Miranda as Julio
- Héctor Calcaño as Luis' uncle
- Alberto Bello as Heaven's manager
- Analía Gadé as Carmen
- Jorge Rigaud as himself
- Alba Mujica as the spiritist

== Style ==
The film's style has been described as "unclassifiable". Critic Fernando Martín Peña felt that Cita en las estrellas "surprises above all because it is a unique film in Argentine cinema [...] due to its lack of prejudice, its awareness of common places and its way of using that awareness to benefit a humor that today we would call postmodern."

== Reception ==
The film was well received by critics, with newspaper La Nación commending its narrative. Some elements of the film were compared to Henry Hathaway's Peter Ibbetson.
