= Maestro Levita =

- Directed by: Luis César Amadori
- Written by: Luis César Amadori; Antonio Botta; René Garzón
- Starring: Pepe Arias; Mecha Ortiz; Juan Carlos Thorry
- Edited by: Carlos Rinaldi
- Release date: 1938
- Running time: 105 minutes
- Country: Argentina
- Language: Spanish

Maestro Levita is a 1938 Argentine film directed by Luis César Amadori during the Golden Age of Argentine cinema. The film premiered in Buenos Aires.

== Synopsis ==
A teacher in a rural school is coping with few resources at his little school in the forgotten town of Puentecito. He goes to the city to seek resources for the school.

== Cast ==
- Pepe Arias as Simón Galván
- Mecha Ortiz as Elena Acevedo de Lerena
- Juan Carlos Thorry as Roberto Casaval
- María Santos as Señorita Baigorria
- Aída Olivier as Isabel
- Miguel Gómez Bao as Dr.Ferran
- Alberto Bello as Sr. Navarro
- Delia Garcés as Felisa
- Semillita as Newsboy
- Raúl Rossi as Boy
- Bernardo Perrone as Judge
- Lalo Malcolm as Elena's friend
- Cirilo Etulain as Attorney
