= The Great Deceiver (film) =

1953 film by Fernando Soler

- Directed by: Fernando Soler
- Written by: Joaquín Abati (play); Federico Reparaz (play); Fernando Soler
- Starring: Fernando Soler; Anita Blanch
- Cinematography: Víctor Herrera
- Music by: Gonzalo Curiel
- Production company: Cinematografistas Mexicanos Asociados
- Release date: 22 August 1953
- Running time: 90 minutes
- Country: Mexico
- Language: Spanish

The Great Deceiver or Artificial Sons (Spanish: El gran mentiroso) is a 1953 Mexican comedy film directed by and starring Fernando Soler. It is based on a play which has been adapted into films several times including the 1943 Argentine production Artificial Sons.

== Cast ==
- Fernando Soler as Rafael
- Anita Blanch as Rafaela
- Andrés Soler as Don Dabino
- Irma Torres as Angelita
- Joaquín Cordero as Fernando Palmerin
- Emma Roldán as Catalina
- Aurora Walker as Mama de Fernando
- Alfonso Torres
- Rosa P. Mosquera
- Jorge Vidal
- Blanca Marroquín
- María Herrero as La coralito
- José Chávez

== Locations ==
- Heroica Zitácuaro, Michoacán
- San José Purúa spa in Jungapeo, Michoacán

== Bibliography ==
- María Luisa Amador. Cartelera cinematográfica, 1950-1959. UNAM, 1985.
