= Los secretos del buzón =

- Directed by: Catrano Catrani
- Written by: Ariel Cortazzo
- Starring: Pedro Quartucci; Tito Lusiardo; Augusto Codecá; Nelly Darén; Elina Colomer
- Music by: George Andreani
- Production company: Estudios San Miguel
- Release date: 22 April 1948
- Running time: 80 minutes
- Country: Argentina
- Language: Spanish

Los secretos del buzón (transl. The mailbox secrets) is a 1948 Argentine comedy film of the classical era of Argentine cinema, directed by Catrano Catrani and written by Ariel Cortazzo. It was premiered on April 22, 1948.

The film narrates the infidelity suspicions of an apothecary to his wife.

== Cast ==
- Pedro Quartucci
- Tito Lusiardo
- Augusto Codecá
- Nelly Darén
- Elina Colomer
- Carlos Castro
- Benita Puértolas
- José Ruzzo
- Alberto Dalbes
- Nelly Meden
- Carlos Rivas
- Max Citelli
