= It Happened in Damascus =

1943 film

- Directed by: José López Rubio; Primo Zeglio
- Written by: Luciano Ramo; José López Rubio; Primo Zeglio
- Based on: El asombro de Damasco by Joaquín Abati and Antonio Paso
- Produced by: Manuel de Lara; Felice Romano
- Starring: Paola Barbara; Germana Paolieri; Miguel Ligero
- Cinematography: Theodore J. Pahle
- Edited by: Angelo L. Comitti
- Music by: Jesús Guridi; Pablo Luna
- Production companies: Consorzio EIA; Ufisa
- Distributed by: Consorzio EIA
- Release date: 14 January 1943
- Running time: 92 minutes
- Countries: Italy; Spain
- Language: Italian

It Happened in Damascus (Italian: Accadde a Damasco, Spanish: Sucedió en Damasco) is a 1943 Italian-Spanish comedy film directed by José López Rubio and Primo Zeglio and starring Paola Barbara, Germana Paolieri and Miguel Ligero. It is based on the 1916 Zarzuela El asombro de Damasco by Joaquín Abati and Antonio Paso. A co-production, it was shot at the Orphea Studios in Barcelona. The film's sets were designed by the art director Pierre Schild.

== Cast ==
- Paola Barbara as Zobaida
- Germana Paolieri as Fahima
- Miguel Ligero as Ben Ibhem / Ben-Vai-Ben
- Lauro Gazzolo as Cadi Al-Mon
- Luis de Arnedillo as El califa Soliman / Il califfo Solimano
- Rafael Navarro as El gran vizir / Il gran visir
- Manuel Arbó as Kafur
- Carmen Arrojo as La mensajera del califa / La messaggera del califfo
- Floriana Morresi as Una bailarina / Una ballerina

== Bibliography ==
- Chiti, Roberto & Poppi, Roberto. I film: Tutti i film italiani dal 1930 al 1944. Gremese Editore, 2005.
