= Artificial Sons (film) =

- Directed by: Antonio Momplet
- Written by: Joaquín Abati (play); Antonio Momplet; Federico Reparaz (play)
- Produced by: Luis Giudici
- Cinematography: José María Beltrán
- Edited by: Carlos Rinaldi
- Music by: Mario Maurano
- Production company: San Miguel Films
- Release date: 1967
- Country: Argentina
- Language: Spanish

Artificial Sons (Spanish: Los hijos artificiales) is a 1943 Argentine comedy film of the classical era of Argentine cinema directed by Antonio Momplet. It was based on a play of the same name that was later turned into the 1953 Mexican film The Great Deceiver.

The film's art direction was by Ralph Pappier.

== Cast ==
- Joaquín Abati
- Olimpio Bobbio
- Adrián Cuneo
- Isabel Figlioli
- Felisa Mary
- Sara Olmos
- Raimundo Pastore
- Iris Portillo
- Pedro Quartucci
- María Santos
- Alberto Terrones
- Malisa Zini
- Marcos Zucker
- Francisco Álvarez

== Bibliography ==
- Alfred Charles Richard. Censorship and Hollywood's Hispanic image: an interpretive filmography, 1936-1955. Greenwood Press, 1993.
