= Bruges-la-Morte =

1892 short novel by Georges Rodenbach

Bruges-la-Morte (French; The Dead [City of] Bruges) is a short novel by the Belgian author Georges Rodenbach, first published in 1892. The novel is notable for two reasons: it is an archetypal Symbolist novel, and was the first work of fiction illustrated with photographs.

A translation by Thomas Duncan was published by Atlas Press in London in 1993.

A new English translation of Bruges-la-Morte, by Will Stone and Mike Mitchell, appeared in 2005, published by Dedalus Books and with an introduction by Alan Hollinghurst.

== Plot ==
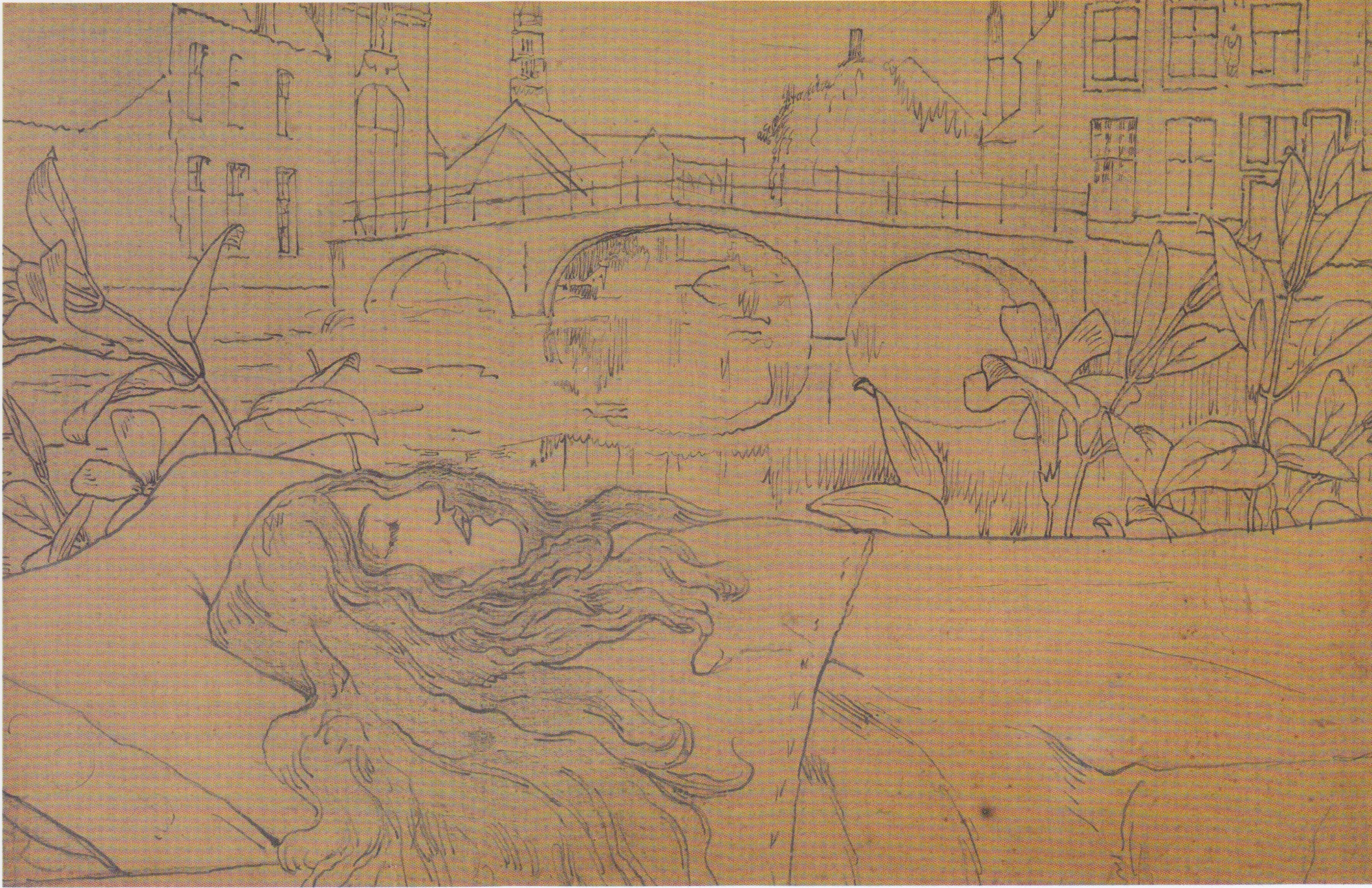
Book cover design by Fernand Khnopff for Bruges-la-Morte by Georges Rodenbach

It tells the story of Hugues Viane, a widower overcome with grief who takes refuge in Bruges, where he lives among the relics of his former wife – her clothes, her letters, a length of her hair – rarely leaving his house. However, he becomes obsessed with Jane, a dancer he sees at the opera Robert le diable who bears a likeness to his dead wife. He courts her, but in time he comes to see she is very different, coarser. When Jane toys with a lock of his late wife's hair, Hugues uses the hair to strangle her.

== Literary history ==
Bruges-la-Morte is a Symbolist novel, perhaps the Symbolist novel, according to critic James Gardner. The book is notable for its poetic evocation of the decaying city and for its innovative form. It is very modern (as in modernism) in the sense that nothing much happens. It falls within the camp of realist symbolism.

Rodenbach interspersed his text with dozens of black-and-white photographs of Bruges. It is believed to be the first work of fiction illustrated with photographs. The novel includes 35 pictures in total. The only current French edition that features the original pictures is the GF Flammarion edition edited by Jean-Pierre Bertrand and Daniel Grojnowski, which was published in 1998, on the centenary of Rodenbach's death. The English translation by Will Stone and Mike Mitchell, published by Dedalus Press, includes a series of modern photographs instead of the originals.

== Adaptions and influences ==
In 1915 Russian director Yevgeni Bauer adapted the novel for the screen. It was renamed Daydreams, the action was moved from Bruges to contemporary Moscow and characters' names were changed, but otherwise the film is faithful to the book.

In 1920 the composer Erich Wolfgang Korngold used the novel as the basis for his opera Die tote Stadt.

The 1956 Argentine film Beyond Oblivion directed by Hugo del Carril is loosely based on the novel.

In 1978 American film director Ronald Chase adapted the novel as Bruges la morte.

In 1980 the French film director Alain Dhénaut adapted the novel as Bruges la morte as an episode in the "Le roman du samedi" (1980–1981) TV series.

In 1981 the Flemish film director Roland Verhavert adapted the novel as Brugge, die stille.

The novel influenced many later writers, including W. G. Sebald. The plot of the book may also have influenced the French crime novel D'entre les morts by Boileau-Narcejac, which was filmed by Alfred Hitchcock as Vertigo in 1958.

The David Bowie song "Dancing Out in Space" from his The Next Day (2013) album is considered to have taken inspiration from the novel.

In 2026 American artist Jesse Richards adapted it under the title The Dead City as a visual novel with Twine.
