= Nacha Regules =

1950 film

- Directed by: Luis César Amadori
- Written by: Luis César Amadori; Pedro Miguel Obligado
- Based on: Nacha Regules by Manuel Gálvez
- Starring: Zully Moreno; Arturo de Córdova; Eduardo Cuitiño
- Cinematography: Alberto Etchebehere
- Edited by: Jorge Gárate
- Music by: Juan Ehlert
- Production company: Argentina Sono Film
- Distributed by: Argentina Sono Film
- Release date: 2 March 1950
- Running time: 107 minutes
- Country: Argentina
- Language: Spanish

Nacha Regules is a 1950 Argentine period romantic melodrama film of the classical era of Argentine cinema, directed by Luis César Amadori and starring Zully Moreno, Arturo de Córdova and Eduardo Cuitiño. It was based on a 1919 novel of the same title by Manuel Gálvez and was a commercial success. The film's sets were designed by the art director Gori Muñoz. Like a number of films of the era, it embraces Peronist themes.

== Synopsis ==
Around the time of the Argentina Centennial, an aristocrat attempts to reform a prostitute he has fallen in love with. They face hostility and mockery from his upper-class friends, but remain together to build a new life together.

== Cast ==
- Zully Moreno as Nacha Regules
- Arturo de Córdova as Fernando Monsalvat
- Eduardo Cuitiño
- Zoe Ducos
- Enrique Chaico
- Diana Maggi
- Federico Mansilla
- Blanca Vidal
- Bernardo Perrone
- Nelly Meden
- Jesús Pampín
- Liana Moabro
- Miriam Sucre
- Domingo Mania
- Camelia de Maucci
- Gloria Ferrandiz
- Julia Giusti
- René Cossa
- Beba Bidart
- Amalia Sánchez Ariño
- Analía Gadé
- César Soriano
- Fernando Campos
- Mónica Linares
- Marta Perez
- Luisa Montero
- Luis García Bosch

== Bibliography ==
- España, Claudio. Luis Cesar Amadori. Centro Editor de América Latina, 1993.
- Goble, Alan. The Complete Index to Literary Sources in Film. Walter de Gruyter, 1999.
- Karush, Matthew B. Culture of Class: Radio and Cinema in the Making of a Divided Argentina, 1920–1946. Duke University Press, 2012.
