= Miguel Machinandiarena =

Argentine film producer

Miguel Machinandiarena was an Argentine film producer, best remembered for founding Estudios San Miguel in 1937.

== Films ==
- La serpiente de cascabel
- Madame Bovary (1947 film)
