= The Circus Cavalcade =

1945 film

- Directed by: Eduardo Boneo; Mario Soffici
- Written by: Mario Soffici; Francisco Madrid
- Starring: Libertad Lamarque; Hugo del Carril; Armando Bo; Eva Duarte
- Cinematography: Francis Boeniger; Carlos Hernando; Ralph Pappier
- Edited by: Carlos Rinaldi
- Music by: Isidro B. Maiztegui
- Distributed by: Estudios San Miguel
- Release date: May 30, 1945 (Argentina)
- Running time: 91 minutes
- Country: Argentina
- Language: Spanish

The Circus Cavalcade (Spanish: La cabalgata del circo) is a 1945 Argentine musical film directed and written by Mario Soffici with Eduardo Boneo and Francisco Madrid, during the classical era of Argentina cinema. The film was shot on black-and-white stock with a monaural soundtrack. It stars Libertad Lamarque and Hugo del Carril.

In 2022, it was selected as the 52nd greatest film of Argentine cinema in a poll organized by the specialized magazines La vida útil, Taipei and La tierra quema, which was presented at the Mar del Plata International Film Festival.

== Plot Outline ==
The lives, loves and vicissitudes of a group of circus performers in the Argentine Pampas around the turn of the century are played out in this drama with songs.

== Cast ==
A scene of La cabalgata del circo, with Libertad Lamarque and Hugo del Carril in the centre.

- Libertad Lamarque .... Nita
- Hugo del Carril .... Roberto
- José Olarra
- Orestes Caviglia
- Juan José Miguez
- Armando Bo
- Ilde Pirovano
- Tino Tori
- Elvira Quiroga
- Eva Duarte
- Ricardo Castro Ríos
- Ana Nieves
- Carlos Rivas
