= En el último piso =

- Directed by: Catrano Catrani
- Written by: Ariel Cortazzo; Conrado de Koller
- Music by: George Andreani
- Distributed by: Panamericana
- Release date: 1942
- Country: Argentina
- Language: Spanish

En el último piso is a 1942 Argentine film directed by Catrano Catrani during the Golden Age of Argentine cinema.

== Cast ==
- Zully Moreno
- Juan Carlos Thorry
- Miguel Gómez Bao
- José Blanco
- Hector Chevalier ... El Tata
- Max Citelli
- Dario Cossier
- Adrián Cuneo
- César Fiaschi
- Fernando Lamas
- Rosa Martín
- Salvador Sinaí
