= La Comedia inmortal =

- Directed by: Catrano Catrani
- Written by: Tulio Demicheli, Ulises Petit de Murat
- Edited by: Oscar Carchano
- Music by: George Andreani
- Release date: 9 February 1951
- Running time: 95 minutes
- Country: Argentina
- Language: Spanish

La Comedia inmortal is a 1951 Argentine film directed by Catrano Catrani. The film premiered on February 9, 1951. It is about a librarian in love with a man played by Tato Bores.

== Cast ==
- Enrique Abeledo
- Leo Alza
- Vicente Ariño
- Tato Bores
- Max Citelli
- Pablo Cumo
- Miguel Dante
- María del Río
- Enrique Fava
- Ricardo Lavié
- Herminia Llorente
- Mecha López
- Paquita Muñoz
- Juan Pecci
- Pedro Pompillo
- Isabel Pradas
- Benita Puértolas
- Pedro Quartucci
- Hilda Rey
- Judith Sulian
- Juan Carlos Thorry
- Aída Villadeamigo
- Olga Zubarry
