= Madame Bovary (1947 film) =

- Directed by: Carlos Schlieper
- Written by: María Luz Regás
- Based on: Madame Bovary; 1857 novel by Gustave Flaubert
- Produced by: Miguel Machinandiarena
- Starring: Mecha Ortiz; Roberto Escalada; Enrique Diosdado; Alberto Bello
- Cinematography: Bob Roberts
- Edited by: Kurt Land
- Music by: Isidro B. Maiztegui
- Production company: San Miguel Films
- Distributed by: Panamericana
- Release date: 2 April 1947
- Running time: 85 minutes
- Country: Argentina
- Language: Spanish

Madame Bovary is a 1947 Argentine historical drama film of the classical era of Argentine cinema, directed by Carlos Schlieper and starring Mecha Ortiz, Roberto Escalada and Enrique Diosdado. It is an adaptation of Gustave Flaubert's 1857 novel Madame Bovary.

== Plot summary ==
The narrative is introduced in a courtroom where the author, Gustave Flaubert, challenges a decision to ban his novel, Madame Bovary, which has been deemed vile and immoral.

Flaubert argues his case by telling the story of Emma to the court and the audience, a sensitive but capricious woman whose desperate efforts to overcome the bourgeois conventions of a dull. She begins a series of passionate but failed affairs, seeking excitement and wealth. With her debts mounting and her lovers gone, Emma is unable to find money to pay them off. She takes arsenic and dies a painful death, after which her husband, Carlos, discovers the truth of her affairs through her love letters. Carlos, heartbroken and devastated, dies in poverty, and their daughter is sent to live with a poor aunt.

The film concludes with the court ruling that the novel can be published, accepting Flaubert's account as the "true story".

== Cast ==
- Mecha Ortiz as Ema Bovary
- Roberto Escalada as León Dupuis
- Enrique Diosdado as Rodolfo Boulanger
- Alberto Bello as Carlos Bovary
- Angelina Pagano as Sra Bovary, mother
- Ricardo Galache as Gustave Flaubert
- Graciela Lecube as Felicidad
- Juan Carlos Altavista as Justino
- María Esther Podestá as Viuda Lefrancois
- Alejandro Maximino as Monsieur Homais
- Max Citelli as Sr. Binet
- Liana Moabro as Sra. Homais
- Nélida Romero as Artemisa
- Jorge Villoldo as Coachman

== Bibliography ==
- Goble, Alan. The Complete Index to Literary Sources in Film. Walter de Gruyter, 1999.
