= Fantasmas en Buenos Aires =

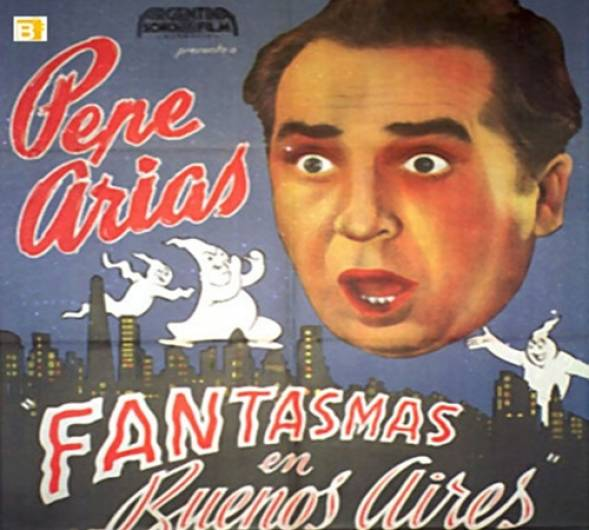
- Directed by: Enrique Santos Discépolo
- Written by: Manuel Meaños; Marcelo Menasche; Enrique Santos Discépolo
- Starring: Pepe Arias, María Esther Buschiazzo, Chela Cordero
- Edited by: Nicolás Proserpio
- Music by: Mario Maurano
- Production company: Argentina Sono Film
- Release date: July 8, 1942
- Running time: 89 minutes
- Country: Argentina
- Language: Spanish

Fantasmas en Buenos Aires (Ghosts in Buenos Aires) is a 1942 Argentine comedy film of the Golden Age of Argentine cinema, directed by Enrique Santos Discépolo and starring Pepe Arias.

== Production ==
The 89-minute film was shot in black and white for Argentina Sono Film, directed by Enrique Santos Discépolo. It was the first film for which he was sole director. It starred Pepe Arias, María Esther Buschiazzo and Chela Cordero. Mario Maurano wrote the music.

== Synopsis ==
The writers, Manuel A. Meaños, Enrique Santos and Marcelo Menasche Discépolo, based the film on a strange story that circulated in Buenos Aires around 1940. It told of an apparition in the form of a beautiful and enigmatic girl (Buschiazzo) who danced one night with the cashier (Arias) of a large commercial firm. She apparently had returned from the beyond, and would again fade into the shadows.

== Reception ==
The film has been called one of the most original and compelling films of the trajectory of the great comedian, Pepe Arias.

== Full cast ==
The full cast was:

- Pepe Arias
- María Esther Buschiazzo
- Chela Cordero
- Ramón Garay
- Enrique García Satur
- Carlos Lagrotta
- Zully Moreno
- José Antonio Paonessa
- Julio Renato
- Casimiro Ros
