= Angelina Pagano =

Argentine actress (1888–1962)

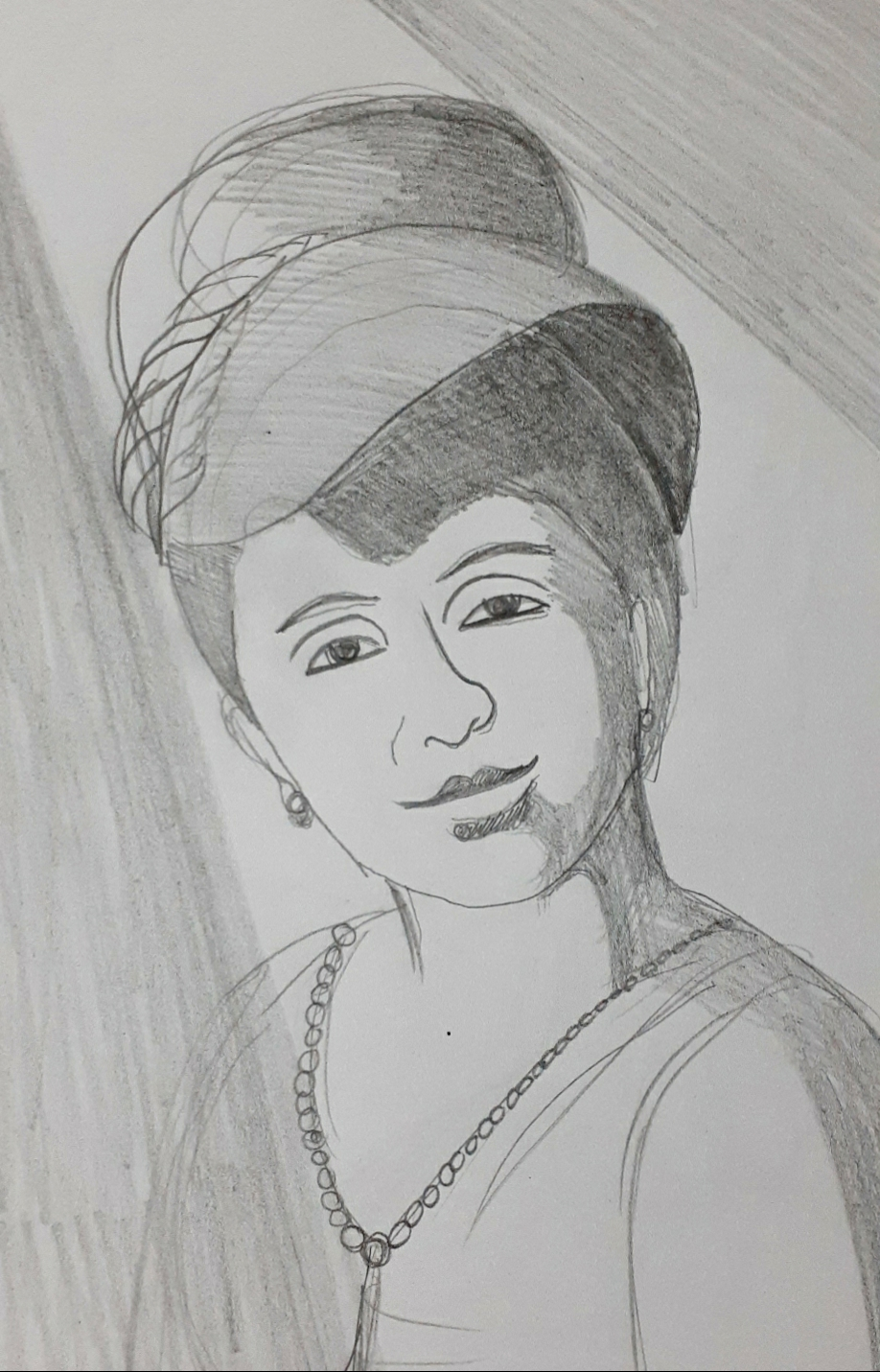
- Sketch of Angelina Pagano
- Born: 3 December 1888; Buenos Aires, Argentina
- Died: 9 June 1962 (aged 73); Buenos Aires, Argentina
- Occupation: Actress
- Years active: 1917-1949 (film)

Angelina Pagano (1888–1962) was an Argentine stage and film actress. Pagano appeared in eighteen films, but was best known for her stage acting and work as a theatre director. She was born on 3 December 1888, and died on 9 June 1962

== Selected filmography ==
- A Doll's House (1943)
- The Prodigal Woman (1945)
- Madame Bovary (1947)

== Bibliography ==
- Finkielman, Jorge. The Film Industry in Argentina: An Illustrated Cultural History. McFarland, 24 December 2003.
