= Fedra (film) =

- Directed by: Manuel Mur Oti
- Written by: Seneca the Younger (play); Antonio Vich; Manuel Mur Oti
- Produced by: Rafael Carrillo
- Starring: Emma Penella; Enrique Diosdado; Vicente Parra
- Cinematography: Manuel Berenguer
- Edited by: Antonio Gimeno
- Music by: Guillermo Cases
- Production company: Suevia Films
- Distributed by: Suevia Films
- Release date: 26 November 1956
- Running time: 100 minutes
- Country: Spain
- Language: Spanish

Fedra (stylized as FΣDRA during the initial credits) is a 1956 Spanish drama film directed by Manuel Mur Oti and starring Emma Penella, Enrique Diosdado and Vicente Parra.

== Synopsis ==
The story is based in Seneca the Younger's tragedy Phaedra.

A pretty and untamed girl named Estrella does not fit in her fishing village by the Spanish Mediterranean. She is lusted after by the men and despised by the women. She is pretended by Juan, a rich shipowner from the North. However she falls in love with Fernando, a subordinate of Juan's, wo loves horses and dislikes the seaside. Her advances are rejected by Fernando. Estrella accepts marrying Juan, who has established himself in the village to be closer to her. Then she learns that Fernando is Juan's son from an earlier marriage. The wedding features the Midsummer bonfires. Estrella and Fernando jump the fire and dance with the village couples. Later, Juan has to take to sea. Fernando wishes to leave but stays until his return. In the summer night, Estrella tries to get closer to him. Fernando ends up escaping for several days. The villagers has seen Estrella chasing Fernando in her nightdress and rumor of infidelity spreads. Juan's ship returns because of a storm. Fernando announces he will leave. Estrella confronts him in the ruins where he keeps his horses, begging for him to take her. Fernando rejects her and lashes her. Juan is asked by the villagers to use his motor boat Fedra to rescue the other fishing vessels. He takes Fernando with him, thinking he has abused his stepmother. Fernando falls overboard in the storm and Juan's ship sets to find him. Meanwhile, the women of the village chase Estrella until she falls off a cliff. After the storm calms, the ship sights Fernando's body. Estrella, who has survived her fall, swims toward him and sinks with him.

== Cast ==
- Emma Penella as Estrella
- Enrique Diosdado as Don Juan
- Vicente Parra as Fernando
- Manuel de Juan as Matías
- Raúl Cancio as Vicente
- Rafael Calvo as Pedro
- Porfiria Sanchíz as Rose
- Alfonso Rojas as Souto
- Ismael Elma as Ismael
- Xan das Bolas
- Mariano del Cacho
- José Riesgo

== Bibliography ==
- Mira, Alberto. Historical Dictionary of Spanish Cinema. Scarecrow Press, 2010.
