= Flecha de oro =

- Spanish film poster of the film
- Directed by: Carlos F. Borcosque
- Written by: Carlos F. Borcosque, Eduardo Ursini
- Starring: Mario Maurano
- Cinematography: Alberto Etchebehere
- Release date: 1940
- Running time: 85 minutes
- Country: Argentina
- Language: Spanish

Flecha de oro is a 1940 Argentine film of the Golden Age of Argentine cinema directed by Carlos F. Borcosque and starring Pepe Arias and Gloria Grey.

== Cast ==
- Pepe Arias
- Gloria Grey
- Juana Sujo
- Pablo Palitos
- Ricardo Grau
- Felisa Mary
- Tito Gómez
- Mecha López
- Semillita
- Agustín Barrios
- Ernesto Villegas
- Lalo Malcolm
- Salvador Sinaí
- Inés Edmonson
- Adrián Cuneo
- Pepe Biondi
- Elisa Labardén
