= Piero Ballerini =

Italian screenwriter and film director (1901–1955)

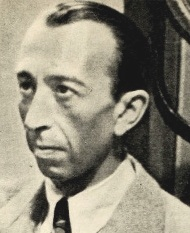
- Born: 20 March 1901; Como, Lombardy, Italy
- Died: 30 June 1955 (aged 54); Rome, Lazio, Italy
- Occupations: Writer, Director
- Years active: 1935-1954 (film)

Piero Ballerini (20 March 1901 – 30 June 1955) was an Italian screenwriter and film director.

== Biographie ==
He began his activity in cinema as an assistant director in France. Upon returning to Italy he shot his first film,Golden Arrow (1935 film), also editing the screenplay and directed together with Corrado D'Errico.

He later directed other feature films of little interest. He was among the few directors who joined the Italian Social Republic: in the fall of 1943 he moved to Venice, where two film studios were hastily installed in those months. His is the direction of Un fatto di cronaca, the last film starring Osvaldo Valenti and Luisa Ferida. After the war he resumed his activity as director and screenwriter with commercial films.

He was married to actress Milena Penovich.

He died in Rome at the age of 54.

== Selected filmography ==
- Golden Arrow (1935)
- Bridge of Glass (1940)
- The Prisoner of Santa Cruz (1941)
- Two Hearts (1943)
- Immigrants (1948)
- Alguien se acerca (1948): Unreleased 1948 Argentine film
- Peppino e la vecchia signora (1954)

== Bibliography ==
- Brunetta, Gian Piero. The History of Italian Cinema: A Guide to Italian Film from Its Origins to the Twenty-first Century. Princeton University Press, 2009.
