= Las seis suegras de Barba Azul =

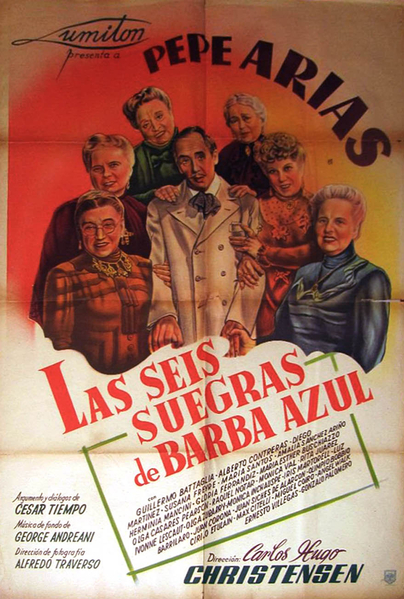
- Directed by: Carlos Hugo Christensen
- Written by: César Tiempo
- Starring: Pepe Arias, Guillermo Battaglia and Alberto Contreras
- Cinematography: Alfredo Traverso
- Edited by: Nello Melli, A. Rampoldi
- Music by: George Andreani
- Production company: Lumiton
- Release date: 10 August 1945 (Argentina)
- Running time: 84 minutes
- Language: Spanish

Las seis suegras de Barba Azul (Bluebeard's Six Mothers-in-Law) is a 1945 black and white Argentine comedy film directed by Carlos Hugo Christensen during the classical era of Argentine cinema.

== Production ==
The black and white Lumiton production was directed by Carlos Hugo Christensen and written by César Tiempo. It starred Pepe Arias, Guillermo Battaglia and Alberto Contreras. It was released in Argentina on 10 August 1945.

== Synopsis ==
A man who has been widowed six times is living with his six mothers-in-law. He looks for a new wife.

== Reception ==
La Nación praised Christensen's direction, moving the plot of the farce along easily. It said that Pepe Arias played one of his most interesting film roles. Carlos Inzillo in Queridos Filipipones said that Christensen's film, perhaps influenced by Marcel Pagnol or René Clair, proceeds slowly and engages in manners ... this is a more intellectual role for Pepe ... different from his usual stereotype.

== Complete cast ==
The complete cast was:

- Pepe Arias
- Guillermo Battaglia
- Alberto Contreras
- Diego Martínez
- Susana Freyre
- María Santos
- Amalia Sánchez Ariño
- Herminia Mancini
- Gloria Ferrandiz
- María Esther Buschiazzo
- Olga Casares Pearson
- Raquel Notar
- Mónica Val
- Rita Juárez
- Ivonne Lescaut
- Olga Zubarry
- Mónica Inchauspe
- Iris Martorell
- Luis Barrilaro
- Juan Corona
- Juan Siches de Alarcón
- Olimpio Bobbio
- Cirilo Etulain
- Max Citelli
- Miguel Coiro
- Ángel Walk
- Ernesto Villegas
- Gonzalo Palomero
