= The Phantom Lady (film) =

- Theatrical release poster
- Directed by: Luis Saslavsky
- Written by: Rafael Alberti; María Teresa León
- Starring: Delia Garcés; Enrique Diosdado
- Cinematography: José María Beltrán
- Edited by: Oscar Carchano
- Music by: Julián Bautista
- Production company: Estudios San Miguel
- Release date: 1945
- Running time: 101 min
- Country: Argentina
- Language: Spanish

The Phantom Lady (Spanish: La Dama duende) is a 1945 Argentine film directed by Luis Saslavsky during the classical era of Argentina cinema. At the 1946 Argentine Film Critics Association Awards the film won Silver Condor Awards for Best Film, Best Director, Best Adapted Screenplay and Best Music. It is based on a seventeenth-century comedy with the same name by Pedro Calderón de la Barca, translated as The Phantom Lady. However, the film alters the play considerably - the plot is heavily rewritten, and the style of dialogue is completely changed. Calderon's comedy is written in verse, while the screenplay of the film is in prose and contains scenes not found in the play. The final scene includes a fierce storm from which the hero rescues the heroine and declares his love for her, a scene added to the film.

It was selected as the eighth greatest Argentine film of all time in a poll conducted by the Museo del Cine Pablo Ducrós Hicken in 1977.

== Plot ==
Doña Ángelica—a beautiful young woman recently widowed at 18—falls in love and wants to marry an Army Officer named Don Manuel. However, to do so, she must evade the watchful eye of her sister-in-law, who wishes to send her to a convent for the rest of her life. To achieve this, she devises a clever ruse that allows her to communicate with Don Manuel in a way that seems mysterious and inexplicable, appearing to him as a goblin or ghost.

== Cast ==
- Delia Garcés
- Enrique Diosdado
- Paquita Garzón
- Manuel Collado
- Antonia Herrero
- Amalia Sánchez Ariño
- Alejandro Maximino
- Helena Cortesina
- Andrés Mejuto
- Ernesto Vilches
- María José
- Manuel Díaz de la Haza
- Francisco López Silva
