= El fin de la noche =

- Directed by: Alberto de Zavalía
- Written by: Carlos Aden; Hugo MacDougall
- Produced by: Francisco Cárdenas
- Starring: Libertad Lamarque
- Cinematography: Vicente Cosentino
- Edited by: Oscar Carchano
- Music by: Paul Misraki
- Production company: Estudios San Miguel
- Distributed by: Distribuidora Panamericana
- Release date: 1 November 1944
- Running time: 94 minutes
- Country: Argentina
- Language: Spanish

El fin de la noche (English: End of the Night) is a 1944 Argentine film of the classical era of Argentine cinema. It is notable for being an anti-Nazi film made in neutral Argentina during World War II and set in occupied France. Shot from August to November 1943 in Cordoba Province, its release was put on hold for more than a year, pending authorization by the pro-Axis military government of that time. The film is also remembered in Argentina for Libertad Lamarque's performance of the tango Uno, composed by Mariano Mores and Enrique Santos Discépolo.

== Plot ==
A female Argentine (Note: Described in the film as a "cantante sudamericana" (South American singer) for political reasons.) tango singer in occupied France, Lola Morel, gets romantically involved with Daniel, a Resistance member. A local Gestapo commander, Kleit, tries to convince her to infiltrate the Resistance in exchange for her little daughter's safety.

== Cast ==
- Libertad Lamarque...Lola Morel
- Juan José Míguez...Daniel
- Alberto Bello...Herr Kleit
- María Esther Buschiazzo …Madame Gené
- Ernesto Raquén …Jaime
- Florence Marly...Agent "Pilar"
- Homero Cárpena...Resistance's driver
- Rene Mugica...Kleit's assistan
