= Ricardo Castro Ríos =

Spanish film actor (1920–2001)

- Born: April 2, 1920; Vigo, Pontevedra, Galicia, Spain
- Died: January 21, 2001 (aged 80); Argentina
- Years active: 1945–1980

Ricardo Castro Ríos (April 2, 1920 – January 21, 2001) was a classic Spanish - Argentine film actor.

He came onto the scene in 1945 in the acclaimed 1945 film La cabalgata del circo in which he starred alongside two of the biggest names in Argentine cinema in the day, Libertad Lamarque and Hugo del Carril.

In 1947 he then starred in another classic, A sangre fría, which also starred Amelia Bence.

He died of cancer in 2001.

== Selected filmography ==
- The Circus Cavalcade (1945)
- Story of a Bad Woman (1948)
- This Earth Is Mine (1961)
