= El Barco sale a las diez =

- Directed by: Francisco Múgica
- Written by: Antonio M. Podestá; Rodolfo M. Taboada; Carlos Warnes
- Cinematography: Humberto Peruzzi
- Edited by: Gerardo Rinaldi
- Release date: 1948
- Running time: 90 minute
- Country: Argentina
- Language: Spanish

El Barco sale a las diez is a 1948 Argentine film directed by Francisco Múgica during the classical era of Argentine cinema.
