= Mirtha Reid =

Uruguayan actress

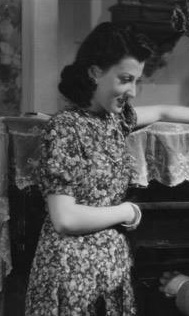
- Reid in 1943
- Born: 29 December 1918; Uruguay
- Died: 30 September 1981 (aged 62); Ituzaingó, Buenos Aires, Argentina
- Other name: María Luisa Queirolo
- Occupation: Actress

Mirtha Reid (1918–1981) was a Uruguayan stage and film actress. She was born as María Luisa Queirolo in Uruguay, but spent most of her career in Argentina where she adopted her stage name. She acted predominantly in the theatre, but also appeared in a handful of films.

== Selected filmography ==
- A Doll's House (1943)

== Bibliography ==
- Malfatti, Arnaldo. Teatro argentino contemporáneo. Aguilar, 1960.
