= A Doll's House (1943 film) =

- Directed by: Ernesto Arancibia
- Screenplay by: Alejandro Casona
- Based on: A Doll's House by Henrik Ibsen
- Produced by: Alberto De Zavalia
- Starring: Delia Garcés; Jorge Rigaud; Sebastián Chiola
- Cinematography: José María Beltrán
- Edited by: Kurt Land
- Music by: Julián Bautista
- Production company: Estudios San Miguel
- Release date: September 21, 1943 (Buenos Aires)
- Running time: 95 minutes
- Country: Argentina
- Language: Spanish

A Doll's House (Spanish: Casa de muñecas) is a 1943 Argentine drama film of the classical era of Argentine cinema, directed by Ernesto Arancibia and starring Delia Garcés and George Rigaud. It is based on the play A Doll's House by Henrik Ibsen. At the 1944 Argentine Film Critics Association Awards, Alberto López won the Best Sound for the film.

== Cast ==
- Delia Garcés
- George Rigaud
- Sebastián Chiola
- Orestes Caviglia
- Alita Román
- Angelina Pagano
- Olga Casares Pearson
- Mirtha Reid
- Jeannet Morel
- Agustín Barrios

== Reception ==
Calki stated in El Mundo that the film is "too lost in a modern framework" in the adaptation by the local cinema, while the critic of La Nación believed that the film had much dignity as an interpretative work, calling it an "interesting and neat version". Raúl Manrupe and María Alejandra Portela later opined that it was the right film at the time but that it now looks dated and static.
