= Carmen Olmedo =

Peruvian actress, dancer, songwriter and vedette

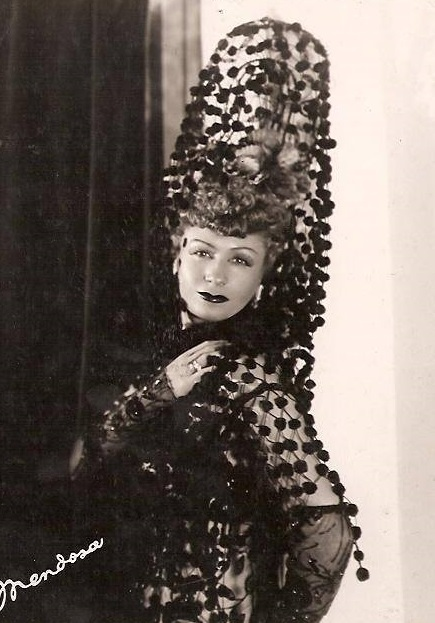
Carmen Olmedo (1930)

Carmen Olmedo (1909-1985) was a Peruvian actress, dancer, songwriter and vedette who made a career in Argentina, Chile and Spain.

== Early life ==
Carmen Olmedo was born in Lima, Peru, 1909. She grew up in an artistic home. Her parents was the Spanish bullfighter, Antonio Olmedo "Valentín", and the singer, Carmen Jaurequizar.

== Career ==
Olmedo reigned on the stages of Argentine theaters as a vedette in the early decades of the 20th century. She worked in numerous musical shows at the Esmeralda Theater (now Maipo Theater) during the 1920s. She formed companies with leading Argentine figures such as Pepe Arias, Totón Podestá, and Tito Lusiardo. In the 1940s, she traveled to Chile to work with other Peruvian personalities such as the stylist, Elsa del Mar, and the singer, Jesús Márquez. She worked at the Patio Andaluz with a company made up of Nicanos Molinare, the Spanish female singer, Carmencita de la Cruz, and the Bernardo Lacasia orchestra. In 1945, she moved to Spain where she performed at the Madrid Theater, the Zarzuela Theater and the Fuencarral Popular Theater. There, she worked with Celia Gámez, Maruja Boldoba, Virginia de Matos or Queta Claver. She formed a company with the Spanish comic actor, Pedrín Fernández. With her show, "Vales en Perú", lyrics by Luis Tejedor and Luis Muñoz Lorente, and music by Iso Fabra, she managed to please the public and remain working for a long time. She also became well known for her interviews with her puppy "Lulú" whom she used to take to her theatrical performances.

== Personal life ==
On March 28, 1930, when she was twenty-one years old, she married the Argentine comedian, Pepe Arias, but the relationship deteriorated due to the jealousy and bad character of Arias that precipitated the breakup of the couple. They finally divorced on July 31, 1934. she Over time she married again, this time, with the banderillero Guillermo Martín. She lived with Martín until her death in Madrid, Spain, 1985.

== Theater ==
- 1928: Caras sonrientes, with Ivo Pelay, Luis César Amadori, Humberto Cairo, Perlita Greco.
- 1928: Estrellas de fuego.
- 1928: Juventud, divino tesoro, with Azucena Maizani, Ángela and Victoria Cuenca, Perlita Greco, Lidia Desmond, and Violeta Desmond.
- 1928: Bertoldo, Bertoldino y el otro, with Azucena Maizani, Manolo Rico, Perlita Grecco, and Enriqueta Mesa.
- 1930: La polka del spiante
- 1930: Los 73 de Vieytes
- 1933: Play premier at Teatro Coliseo with Lila Morales and José Harold.
- 1942: ¡Vales en Perú!, with Pedrín Fernández.
- 1943: Nina no te hagas la estúpida, at Teatro Apolo.
- 1945: Tres días para quererte.
- 1947: Tu-Tú, at teatro Nuevo de Madrid.
- 1947: ¿Quién dijo miedo?.
- 1958: S. E. La Embajadora.
