= Alto Paraná (film) =

1958 film

- Directed by: Catrano Catrani
- Written by: Catrano Catrani based on a novel by Velmiro Ayala Gauna
- Starring: George Hilton; Ariel Absalón; María Aurelia Bisutti
- Edited by: José Cardella
- Release date: 1958
- Running time: 101 minutes
- Country: Argentina
- Language: Spanish

Alto Paraná is a 1958 Argentinian drama film directed and written by Catrano Catrani. The film is based on the novel Los casos de Don Frutos Gómez by Velmiro Ayala Gauna. It was released on September 18, 1958, and rated PG 14.

The film starred George Hilton, Ariel Absalón, María Aurelia Bisutti, Carlos Gómez and Iris Portillo

Alto Paraná is a department of Paraguay.
