= The White Land =

- Directed by: Hugo del Carril
- Written by: Juan José Manauta (novel); Eduardo Borrás
- Produced by: Miguel Ángel Puccio; Hugo del Carril
- Starring: Hugo del Carril; Ricardo Trigo; Amanda Silva; Nora Palmer
- Cinematography: Américo Hoss
- Edited by: Gerardo Rinaldi; Antonio Ripoll
- Music by: Tito Ribero
- Production company: Cinematigráfica L.E.O.
- Release date: February 19, 1959
- Running time: 78 minutes
- Country: Argentina
- Language: Spanish

The White Land (Spanish: Las tierras blancas) is a 1959 Argentine drama film directed by Hugo del Carril and starring del Carril, Ricardo Trigo and Amanda Silva. It is based on a novel by Juan José Manauta. It is set in a poor village in Santiago del Estero Province in Northern Argentina, where the semi-desert climate gives much of the landscape a whitish appearance alluded to in the title.

== Cast ==
- Hugo del Carril as Natalio
- Ricardo Trigo as A Countryman
- Amanda Silva as The Mother
- Nora Palmer as Angelina
- Carlos Olivieri as Odiseo
- Raúl del Valle as The Bully
- Juan José Manauta as The Teacher
- Totón Podestá
- Antonio Capuano
- Mónica Cristina Ramos
- Juan Armendáriz
- David Socco

== Bibliography ==
- Borrás, Eduardo. Las aguas bajan turbias. Editorial Biblos, 2006.
- Cabrera, Gustavo. Hugo del Carril: un hombre de nuestro cine. Ediciones Culturales Argentinas, 1989.
