= Peppino e la vecchia signora =

- Directed by: Emma Gramatica; Piero Ballerini
- Cinematography: Mario Albertelli
- Music by: Umberto Mancini
- Release date: 1954
- Country: Italy
- Language: Italian

Peppino e la vecchia signora (also known as Peppino e la nobile dama) is a 1954 Italian comedy film directed by Emma Gramatica and Piero Ballerini.

== Cast ==
- Peppino De Filippo: Peppino Zaganella
- Emma Gramatica: Maria Ricciardi
- Maresa Gallo: Bianca
- Eloisa Cianni: Laura Di Robilant
- Leonardo Severini: Joe
- Marisa Vernati: lover of Joe
- Umberto Sacripante: accomplice of Joe
- Camillo Pilotto: the inspector
- Nino Marchesini: Commendator Di Robilant
- Gianna Pacetti: Miss Di Robilant
- Enrico De Mellis: Fausto Di Robilant
- Amedeo Trilli: maresciallo Trifoldi
- Maurizio Arena: "posteggiatore""
