= La senda oscura =

1947 film

- Directed by: Luis Moglia Barth
- Written by: Bernardo Verbitsky; Alejhandro Verbitsky; Emilio Villalba Welsh
- Starring: María Duval
- Cinematography: Mario Pagés
- Edited by: José Gallego
- Music by: Alejandro Gutiérrez del Barrio
- Production company: Estudios San Miguel
- Release date: May 9, 1947
- Country: Argentina
- Language: Spanish

La senda oscura (English title: The Dark Path) is a 1947 Argentine melodrama film of the classical era of Argentine cinema, directed by Luis Moglia Barth and starring María Duval, Elsa O'Connor and Ricardo Passano.

== Cast ==
- María Duval …Julia
- Elsa O'Connor …Artea / Mercedes Quiroga
- Ricardo Passano …Carlos Quiroga
- Alberto Contreras …Dr. Esteban Vargas
- Alejandro Maximino … Menéndez
- César Fiaschi …Dr. González
- Pepito Petray …Antonio
- Alfonso Pisano …Hombre 1 en varieté
- Florén Delbene …Amante de Artea
- Mario Baroffio …Hombre 2 en varieté
- Martha Atoche …Gertrudis
- Adolfo Linvel …Dr. Norton
- Francisco Audenino
- Paul Ellis
- Oscar Villa

== See also ==
- List of Argentine films of 1947
