= María Esther Buschiazzo =

Argentine actress (1889–1971)

María Esther Buschiazzo (1889–1971) was an Argentine actress. Since the beginning of the century he began making works by great Argentine authors such as Florencio Sánchez. In 1912 he made his film debut in a silent film directed by Mario Gallo called Tierra Baja, in which Pablo Podestá and Elías Alippi also acted.

== Filmography ==
- Hombre de la esquina rosada (1962)
- La patota (1960)
- Fantoche (1957)
- Cuando los duendes cazan perdices (1955)
- Los troperos (1953)
- Ellos nos hicieron así (1953)
- La casa grande (1953)
- Deshonra (1952)
- Reportaje en el infierno (1951)
- The Earring (1951)
- The Fan (1951)
- Volver a la vida (1951)
- El puente (1950)
- Toscanito y los detectives (1950)
- Diez segundos (1949)
- The Trap (1949)
- La cuna vacía (1949)
- Mujeres que bailan (1949)
- Juan Globo (1949)
- El ídolo del tango (1949)
- Don Bildigerno en Pago Milagro (1948)
- El barco sale a las diez (1948)
- My Poor Beloved Mother (1948)
- María de los Ángeles (1948)
- El cantor del pueblo (1948)
- Mirad los lirios del campo (1947)
- El misterio del cuarto amarillo (1947)
- El diablo andaba en los choclos (1946)
- Las seis suegras de Barba Azul (1945)
- El fin de la noche (1944)
- His Best Student (1944)
- La piel de zapa (1943)
- El sillón y la gran duquesa (1943)
- La suerte llama tres veces (1943)
- Historia de crímenes (1942)
- El viaje (1942)
- Fantasmas en Buenos Aires (1942)
- A Light in the Window (1942)
- La maestrita de los obreros (1942)
- Historia de una noche (1941)
- El mejor papá del mundo (1941)
- La vida del gran Sarmiento (inconclusa - 1941)
- Héroes sin fama (1940)
- The Tango Star (1940)
- La casa del recuerdo (1939)
- ...Y mañana serán hombres (1939)
- Una mujer de la calle (1939)
- Gente bien (1939)
- Palabra de honor (1939)
- The Intruder (1939)
- El canillita y la dama (1938)
- La rubia del camino (1938)
- Dos amigos y un amor (1937)
- La vuelta de Rocha (1937)
- Fuera de la ley (1937)
- Tierra baja (1912)
