= Brother Joe =

El Hermano José
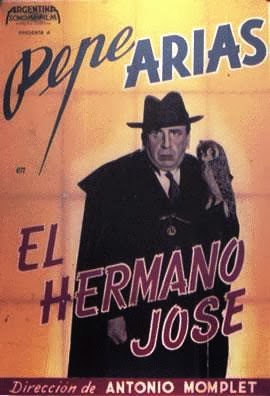
- Directed by: Antonio Momplet
- Written by: Nicolás Proserpio
- Starring: Pepe Arias; Carlos Castro; Ada Cornaro; María Duval
- Cinematography: Antonio Merayo
- Edited by: Nicolás Proserpio
- Production company: Argentina Sono Film
- Release date: 27 August 1941
- Country: Argentina
- Language: Spanish

Brother Joe (Spanish: El Hermano José) is a 1941 Argentine comedy film of the Golden Age of Argentine cinema.

== Production ==
The 93-minute black and white film was made for Argentina Sono Film by director Antonio Momplet. It was written by Nicolás Proserpio, and stars Pepe Arias, Carlos Castro and Ada Cornaro.

== Synopsis ==
The movie deals with the interaction in a small town between a healer, his daughter and a young doctor, between science and superstition.

== Reception ==
La Nación called the film a popular and satirical comedy. Halki noted that it was a visual version of a successful radio show. Manrupe and Portela and said it was a classic Pepe Arias work, with everything good and bad that implies, and had been filmed without much effort.

== Full cast ==
The full cast was:

- Pepe Arias
- Carlos Castro
- Ada Cornaro
- Dario Cossier
- María Duval
- Isabel Figlioli
- Ramón Garay
- Antonio Gianelli
- José Otal
- Raimundo Pastore
- Ernesto Raquén
- José Ruzzo
- Semillita
- Ernesto Villegas
