= Beyond Oblivion =

- Laura Hidalgo and Hugo del Carril in the film
- Directed by: Hugo del Carril
- Screenplay by: Eduardo Borrás
- Based on: Bruges-la-Morte by Georges Rodenbach
- Produced by: Hugo del Carril
- Cinematography: Alberto Etchebehere
- Edited by: Jorge Gárate; Higinio Vecchione
- Music by: Tito Ribero
- Release date: 14 June 1956
- Running time: 93 minutes
- Country: Argentina
- Language: Spanish

Beyond Oblivion (Spanish: Más allá del olvido) is a 1956 Argentine melodrama film from the classical period, directed by Hugo del Carril and starring Laura Hidalgo and del Carril. It tells the story of a man who has lost the woman he loved and tries to turn another woman into her. The screenplay is loosely based on the novel Bruges-la-Morte by Georges Rodenbach.

== Cast ==
- Laura Hidalgo as Blanca de Arellano / Mónica
- Hugo del Carril as Fernando de Arellano
- Eduardo Rudy as Luis Marcel, alias Mauricio Pontier
- Gloria Ferrandiz as Sabina, ama de llaves
- Ricardo Galache as Médico professor Santillán
- Pedro Laxalt as Médico doctor Don Álvaro,
- Francisco López Silva as Esteban, mayordomo
- Ricardo de Rosas as Bernabé, cochero
- Víctor Martucci as Médico amigo del professor Santillán
- Lili Gacel as Herminia, mucama

== Release ==
The film was released theatrically in Argentina on 14 June 1956.
