= Nelly Meden =

Argentine actress

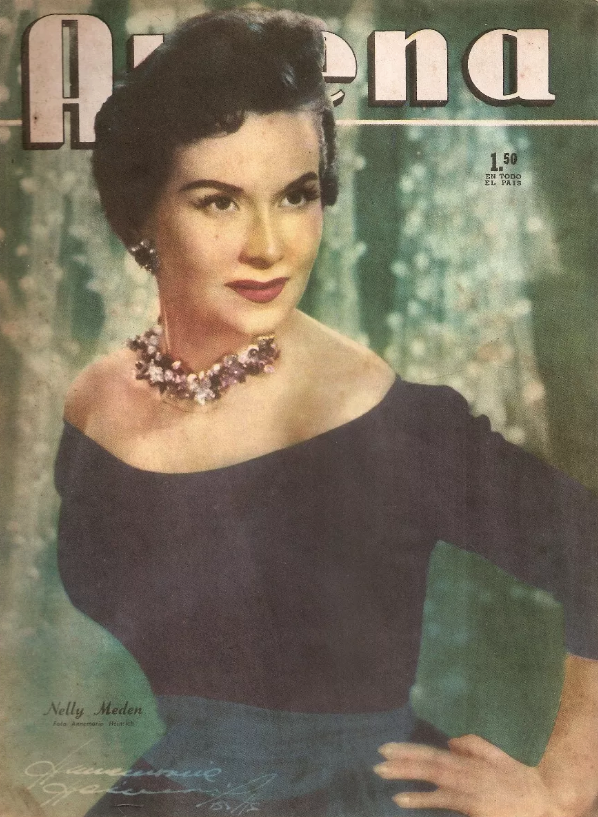
- Nelly Meden by Annemarie Heinrich, 1956
- Born: 14 March 1928; Rosario, Santa Fe, Argentina
- Died: 8 November 2004 (aged 76); Buenos Aires, Argentina
- Occupation: Actress
- Years active: 1948-1986 (film & TV)

Nelly Meden (1928–2004) was an Argentine film, stage and television actress.

== Selected filmography ==
- White Horse Inn (1948)
- Los secretos del buzón (1948)
- La serpiente de cascabel (1948)
- Nacha Regules (1950)
- The Unwanted (1951)
- To Live for a Moment (1951)
- The Count of Monte Cristo (1953)
- El Último perro (1956)
- The Whole Year is Christmas (1960)
- This Earth Is Mine (1961)
- By Killing (1965)

== Bibliography ==
- Klossner, Michael. The Europe of 1500-1815 on Film and Television: A Worldwide Filmography of Over 2550 Works, 1895 Through 2000. McFarland & Company, 2002.
