= Enrique Diosdado =

Spanish actor (1910–1983)

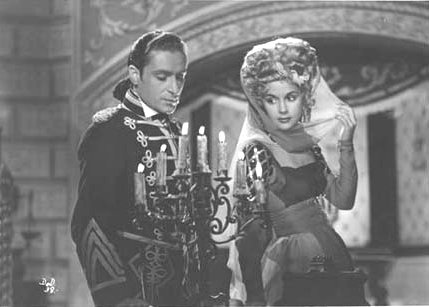
- Diosdado with Delia Garcés in The Phantom Lady (1945)
- Born: 6 May 1910; Madrid, Castile; Spain
- Died: 1 December 1983 (aged 73); Madrid, Castile; Spain
- Other name: Enrique Álvarez Diosdado
- Occupation: Actor
- Years active: 1938 - 1978 (film)

Enrique Diosdado (May 6, 1910 – December 1, 1983) was a Spanish actor. He is sometimes credited as Enrique Alvarez Diosdado. Diosdado was a leading man of Spanish and Golden Age Argentine films of the 1940s and 1950s. His daughter, Ana Diosdado, was a leading Spanish writer and playwright. His son, also named Enrique Álvarez-Diosdado, worked as a director and writer for several tv documentary series and films.

== Biography ==
Despite beginning his professional career in journalism, he decided to abandon that path in favor of acting, joining the company of Francisco Pierrá and Amparo Martí. In 1935, he became the leading actor in Margarita Xirgu's company, with which he premiered, among others, The Duchess of Benameji (play) by the Machado brothers and Yerma by Federico García Lorca.

The outbreak of the Spanish Civil War found him on tour in Americas, where he would remain until 1950. There, his daughter Ana Diosdado was born, the fruit of his first marriage to Isabel Gisbert, and he would remarry the actress Amelia de la Torre, with whom he would have another son, also named Enrique Álvarez Diosdado. In Argentina, he made his film debut in Edmundo Guibourg's Bodas de sangre (Blood Wedding, 1938), alongside Xirgu, Song of Dolores(The Song of Dolores, 1947) and La gata (The Cat, 1947).

Upon returning to Spain, he joined the Theatre of María Guerrero, performing in plays such as Don Juan Tenorio (1950), with set design by Salvador Dalí, The Heiress (1951) by Ruth and August Goetz, Marie Antoinette (1952), and The Boss (1953), the latter two by Joaquín Calvo Sotelo, and La Plaza de Berkeley (1952) by John L. Balderston. Shortly afterwards, he shared the stage with Mary Carrillo in El príncipe durmiente (1957) by Terence Rattigan and El cielo dentro de casa (1957) by Alfonso Paso. He would later form his own company with his wife, staging numerous plays, including a version of Edward Albee's Who's Afraid of Virginia Woolf? (1966), as well as The Aspern Papers (1955) by Henry James, Yerma (1960), A Doll's House (1961) by Ibsen, the Spanish premiere of La barca sin pescador (1963) by Alejandro Casona, Nunca es tarde (It's Never Too Late) (1964) by José López Rubio, El carrusel (The Carousel) (1964) by Víctor Ruiz Iriarte, La muchacha del sombrerito rosa (The Girl with the Little Pink Hat) (1967) by Víctor Ruiz Iriarte, The Fabrizzi System (1967) by Albert Husson, Song for a Sunset (1973) by Noel Coward, The Okapi (1972) and The Communards (1974), the latter two written by his own daughter, and Dirty Hands (1977) by Jean-Paul Sartre.

She combines her theater work with her film career, which includes titles such as Viento del norte (North Wind, 1954) by Antonio Momplet, El sol sale todos los días (The Sun Rises Every Day, 1955) by Antonio del Amo, Un ángel pasó por Brooklyn (An Angel Passed Through Brooklyn, 1957) by Ladislao Vajda, and A las cinco de la tarde (At Five in the Afternoon, 1960) by Juan Antonio Bardem. El secreto de Mónica (1961), by José María Forqué, and Historia de una noche, by Luis Saslavsky.

He continued working on stage until illness prevented him from doing so, his last performances being in Jacinto Benavente La Malquerida and Jean-Paul Sartre Manos sucias, both in 1977.

== Selected filmography ==
- Blood Wedding (1938)
- The Phantom Lady (1945)
- María Rosa (1946)
- Madame Bovary (1947)
- The Cat (1947)
- Song of Dolores (1947)
- María de los Ángeles (1948)
- Dance of Fire (1949)
- Last Day (1952)
- Flight 971 (1953)
- At Five O'Clock in the Afternoon (1961)
- Searching for Monica (1962)
- Don Juan Tenorio (1952)
- Pride (1955)
- Fedra (1956)
- The Sun Comes Out Every Day (1956)
- Duel at the Rio Grande (1963)

== Bibliography ==
- Wilson, Katharina M. An Encyclopedia of Continental Women Writers, Volume 1. Taylor & Francis, 1991.
