= Closed Door (1962 film) =

1962 film

A puerta cerrada
- Directed by: Pedro Escudero
- Written by: Pedro Escudero
- Produced by: Fernando Ayala, Héctor Olivera
- Starring: Carlos Brown, María Aurelia Bisutti
- Cinematography: Francis Boeniger
- Edited by: Atilio Rinaldi
- Music by: Rodolfo Arizaga
- Distributed by: Aries Cinematográfica Argentina
- Release date: 5 September 1962
- Country: Argentina
- Language: Spanish

A puerta cerrada (English language: Closed Door) is a 1962 Argentine film directed and written by Pedro Escudero, adapted from the play Huis Clos by Jean-Paul Sartre.

== Release ==
The film was released on 5 September 1962.

== Cast ==
- María Aurelia Bisutti ... Estelle
- Carlos Brown
- Elsa Dorian
- Mario Horna
- Miguel A. Irarte
- Miguel Angel Iriarte
- Inda Ledesma ... Ines
- Duilio Marzio ... Garcin
- Susana Mayo
- Mirta Miller
- Frank Nelson ... The Valet
- Manuel Rosón
- Orlando Sacha
