= Francisco Madrid =

Spanish writer and politician (1900–1952)

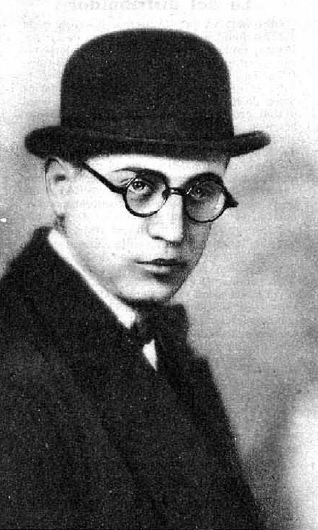
Francisco Madrid, 1927

Francisco "Paco" Madrid (24 February 1900 – 8 January 1952) was a Spanish critic, editor, essayist, historian, journalist, novelist, playwright, and screenwriter. He was also a politician.

== Career ==
He was born in Barcelona in 1900. Francisco Madrid worked as a journalist in Barcelona, Paris, Geneva, Madrid, and Buenos Aires. He wrote essays, novels, and plays. He was also active in politics. In 1931, after the proclamation of the Second Republic, he was appointed Secretary of the Civil Government of Barcelona. In Madrid, he was the vice-editor of the daily La Voz.

Like many supporters of the Spanish Republic, he left Spain in 1936 for Argentina. In Buenos Aires, Francisco Madrid worked as a journalist, most notably for the newspapers Noticias Gráficas, La Prensa, and the magazine El Hogar. However, his major contribution in Argentina was to the Argentine film industry. He wrote or co-wrote seven screenplays, including La cabalgata del circo (1945), co-written with Mario Soffici.

In Buenos Aires, he wrote Cine de hoy y de mañana, published in 1945, and Cincuenta años de cine. Crónica del séptimo arte, published in 1946. The latter is considered a pioneering work, with a full chapter describing the origins and history of the then-incipient Latin American movie industry.

== Works ==
=== Theater ===
- El mal que pot fer una dona, Barcelona, 1926. Premiered by Compañía de María Vila y Pío Davi in Teatro Apolo.
- Joy – Joy, Barcelona, 1926. Musical. Script co-written with José María de Sagarra, Braulio Solsona y Manuel Sugrañes. Music by Enrique Clará. Premiered Teatro Cómico.
- Reus, París y Londres, Barcelona, 1927. Musical. Script co-written with Pedro Puche. Music by Demon. Premiered Teatro Apolo.
- Pocker, Barcelona, 1928. Musical. Script co-written with Joaquín Montero, Braulio Solsona y Manuel Sugrañes. Musica by Enrique Clará.
- 9,000 pesetas, Barcelona, 1928. Premiered by Joaquín Montero.
- Ella, ell i un café romantic, Barcelona 1928. Premiered by María Luisa Rodríguez in Teatro Romea.
- 29, Barcelona, 1929. Musical. Script co-written Braulio Solsona. Musica by Demon. Premiered by Compañía de Elena Jordi in Teatro Goya.
- La Elena i els seus amants, Barcelona, 1929. Premiered by Compañía de Elena Jordi in Teatro Goya.
- Eureka, Barcelona, 1930. Revista musical. Script co-written with Braulio Solsona y Manuel Sugrañes. Music by Enrique Clará.
- She, She, Barcelona, 1930. Revista musical. Script co-written with José María de Sagarra, Braulio Solsona y Manuel Sugrañes. Music by Enrique Clará.
- La Comedia empieza cuando acaba, Barcelona, 1930. Premiered by Company of Camila Quiroga en el Teatro Poliorama.
- Dos damas en el tablero, Barcelona, 1931. Premiered by Company of María Luisa Rodríguez en el Teatro Poliorama.
- Que te parece Lulu?, Barcelona, 1933. Premiered by Company of Enrique Rosas and Matilde Rivera in Teatro Poliorama.
- El día que llegó Adelfa, with Spanish actress María Luisa Rodríguez, premiered in Teatro Avenida, Buenos Aires, Argentina. Also adapted for a male character, premiered on radio by the Argentine actor Pedro López Lagar.
- La vida de María Curie, La Habana, 1940, co-written with Alejandro Casona.
- La Isabela, award-winning play -Argentores Prize- 1948. Premiered in Teatro Argentino by the Compañía de Nélida Quiroga.

=== Essays and novels ===
- El ruidísimo pleito de las juntas de defensa y Millán-Astray, Barcelona: Gráficos Costa, 1922.
- Un diálogo con Don Ramon Valle-Inclán, in La Noche Barcelona, 20-III-1925. Reproduced in Entrevistas, conferencias y cartas, J. Valle-Inclán y J. Valle-Inclán (eds), pp. 275–278, Valencia, Pre-Textos, 1994.
- La senyora del senyor Blum, novel. Barcelona, 1925.
- A la sombra dé la aventura, novel. Barcelona, 1927.
- Los desterrados de la dictadura: reportajes y testimonios, Madrid, Editorial España, 1930.
- Ocho meses y un dia en el gobierno civil de Barcelona: Confesiones y testimonios. (Written under the name Carlos Madrigal.) Barcelona: Las Ediciones de la Flecha, 1932.
- Conferencia Grandeza y miseria de Luis Bello, conference, 23 July 1938, Centro Catalán de Rosario. Later published by Ateneo Luis Bello de Rosario.
- Valor humano de Indalecio Prieto, conference. Buenos Aires: Agrupación Asturiana de Ayuda a España Leal. 1938.
- Las últimas veinticuatro horas de Francisco Layret, Buenos Aires, Publicaciones del Patronato Hispano-Argentino de Cultura, 1942.
- Genio e ingenio de Don Miguel de Unamuno, Buenos Aires, Aniceto López editor, 1943.
- La vida altiva de Valle-Inclán, Buenos Aires, Poseidón, 1943.
- George Bernard Shaw. Sus ideas, sus anécdotas, sus frases, Buenos Aires, Schapire, 1951.
- Sangre en Atarazanas, novel. Barcelona-Madrid, Las Ediciones de La Flecha, 1928.
- Los conspiradores de Ginebra, novel. Published posthumously by Plaza y Janés, 1969.

=== Film essays ===
- Film de la República Comunista Libertaria. Reportaje politico. Barcelona-Madrid: La Flecha, 1932.
- Revista Cine, co-edited with Jaime Jacobson. There, Francisco Madrid published the history of cinema in a hundred installments.
- Mario Soffici o el naturalismo dramático in Los directores argentinos,, collection El cine al día, 1944. Also published by J. M. Couselo, J. Gómez Bas y Kive Staif, Centro de investigación del Cine argentino, Third Mar del Plata International Movie Festival, January 1961.
- Cine de hoy y de mañana, Buenos Aires, Poseidón, 1945.
- Cincuenta años de cine. Crónica del séptimo arte, Buenos Aires, Ediciones del Tridente, 1946.

=== Translations ===
- Baby, la ventafocs núm. 52, of the play Peg o' My Heart by John Hartley Manners, Barcelona, Libraría Bonavia, 1930. Premiered in Teatro Romea, Barcelona, in 1930.
- Tres maneres de parlar, de André Charmul, premiered in Teatro Romea, Barcelona, in 1931.
- The Children's Hour, by Lillian Hellman, translated as Las innocentes, premiered in 1936 in Teatro Corrientes, now Teatro Municipal San Martín.
- Mujeres, by Claire Booth, starring Argentine actress Mecha Ortiz in 1938, Teatro Smart.
- Retrato de familia, starring Argentine actress Blanca Podestá, premiered in Teatro Smart.
- María Rosa, by Àngel Guimerà, starring Amelia Bence y Alberto Closas.
- Nuestro pueblo, by Thornton Wilder, premiered by Compañía de Eva Franco.
- Luz de gas, by Patrick Hamilton, premiered by Camila Quiroga.
- Un invierno en Mallorca, by George Sand. Buenos Aires, Poseidón, 1943.
- La escuela de las mujeres y Roberto – Genoveva. Segunda parte de la escuela de las mujeres, by André Gide, Buenos Aires, Ediciones Malinca, 1954.
- La vida heroica de María Curie, by Eva Curie. Buenos Aires, Espasa-Calpe, 1941.

=== Film ===
==== Screenplays ====
- Wake Up to Life (1945) Según El cobayo del Dr Arnó, by Carlos Alberto Silva.
- The Circus Cavalcade (1945) co-written with Mario Soffici and Eduardo Boneo.
- María Rosa (1946)
- Los pueblos dormidos (1947), documentary.
- La copla de la Dolores (1947) Según Lo que fue de la Dolores, by José Manuel Acevedo. It was titled in English, Song of Dolores.
- Olé torero (1949) by Benito Perojo.
- Sombras en la frontera (1951)

==== Story ====
- María Rosa, (1946) co-written with Ariel Cortazzo.

== Bibliography ==
- Lloréns, Vicente; Aznar Soler, Manuel (2006). Memorias de una emigración: Santo Domingo, 1939-1945. Sevilla: Renacimiento.
