= La serpiente de cascabel =

- Directed by: Carlos Schlieper
- Written by: Eduardo Antón; Ariel Cortazzo
- Produced by: Miguel Machinandiarena
- Starring: María Duval; Juan Carlos Thorry; María Aurelia Bisutti; Milagros de la Vega
- Cinematography: Bob Roberts
- Edited by: Nicolás Proserpio
- Music by: George Andreani, Daniel French
- Production company: Estudios San Miguel
- Release date: March 17, 1948
- Running time: 73 min.
- Country: Argentina
- Language: Spanish

La serpiente de cascabel (transl. The rattlesnake) is a 1948 Argentine comedy film of the classical era of Argentine cinema, directed by Carlos Schlieper and written by Eduardo Antón and Ariel Cortazzo. It was premiered on March 17, 1948.

The film's plot is about a romance between a secondary student (María Duval) who falls in love with her music teacher (Juan Carlos Thorry).

== Cast ==
- Alfredo Alaria
- Beba Bidart
- Cayetano Biondo
- María Aurelia Bisutti
- Susana Campos
- Homero Cárpena
- Patricia Castell
- Ana María Castro
- Max Citelli
- Alberto Contreras
- Milagros de la Vega
- María Duval
- Carlos Fioriti
- Analía Gadé
- Enrique García Satur
- Norma Giménez
- Diana Ingro
- Marga Landova
- Graciela Lecube
- Nelly Meden
- Diana Montes
- Bertha Moss
- Mary Parets
- Teresa Pintos
- Blanca del Prado
- Irma Roy
- María Santos
- Juan Carlos Thorry
- Jorge Villoldo
