= Gloria Ferrandiz =

Gloria Ferrandiz (1893 in Uruguay – 1970) was an Argentine actress of the classic Argentine cinema era. She starred in over 40 films, including the 1962 film Una Jaula no tiene secretos.

== Selected filmography ==
- Las seis suegras de Barba Azul (1945)
- The Trap (1949)
- Nacha Regules (1950)
- This Is My Life (1952)
- Black Ermine (1953)
- End of the Month (1953)
- Beyond Oblivion (1956)
- Behind a Long Wall (1958)
- This Earth Is Mine (1961)
- Una Jaula no tiene secretos (1962)
