= Pepe Arias =

Argentine actor

- Pepe Arias in El profesor Cero (1942)
- Born: José Pablo Arias Martinez; 16 January 1900; Buenos Aires, Argentina
- Died: 23 February 1967 (aged 67); Buenos Aires, Argentina
- Occupations: Actor and comedian
- Known for: Monologues
- Spouse: Carmen Olmedo

Pepe Arias (José Pablo Arias Martinez; 16 January 1900 – 23 February 1967) was an Argentine actor and comedian, notable for his work during the Golden Age of Argentine cinema.

== Early years ==
José Pablo Arias Martinez was born in the former Abasto district of Buenos Aires on 16 January 1900. He first appeared on stage in 1916, and became a remarkable stage actor in grotesque, comedy and drama roles. In 1922 the influence of the company of Madame Rasimi and her Ba-Ta-Clán, arrived from Paris, established the structure of the Buenos Aires revue. Arias learned his art among the founders of Argentine theater, such as Luis Arata and Enrique Da Rosas. He perfected all the elements of farce and grotesque, with his face painted with extreme make-up. He also played serious roles, and earned the Municipal Award for best dramatic actor for his performance in Ovid by Laurent Doillet at the Odeon Theatre in 1942.

== Film and radio ==
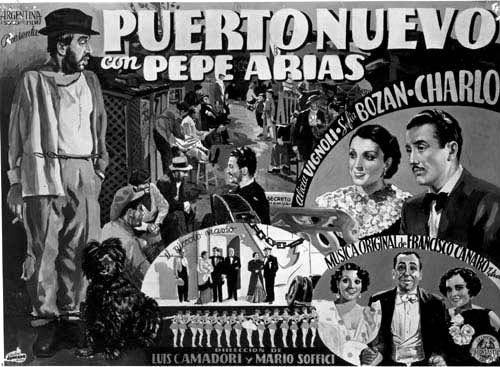
Flyer for Puerto nuevo (1936)

Arias' style became established when he moved to film and radio. He was a pioneer of talking films, and appeared in twenty four films. These included the brilliant Kilómetro 111 (1938) directed by Mario Soffici and Fantasmas en Buenos Aires (1943) directed by Enrique Santos Discépolo. He became known on radio for delivering monologues as characters such as "Don Vistobueno Ciruela". He also starred in long-running revues at the Maipo and the Nacional theaters, and would deliver his monologues on stage. He avoided television, which he called "a dreadful fire that burns with lightning speed".

== Monologues ==
In 1963 Arias described the monologue as a type of political reporting. He said that he read the headlines and told the news on stage, adding a humorous comment but always with up-to-date information. Thursday's political joke is not funny on Friday. He would call his audience his "dear filipipones". The nonsense word perhaps came from "philippic", and was used by his "Brother José" character in El hermano José (1941). The mocking but affectionate greeting became the trademark of his monologues. It is the title of his 1989 biography by Carlos Inzillo.

In 1956 Arias said that political jokes were a basic element of revues in Buenos Aires, and he had never had real problems. He called politics a gentleman's game (juego de caballeros), which the public always understood, as did the governments of Yrigoyen, Alvear, Uriburu, Justo, Ortiz and Castillo. Those political leaders knew how to laugh. They knew that humor turned politics into a game and stripped it of solemnity and seriousness, which are always dangerous. Politics is a gentleman's game and those who are not gentlemen cannot play politics. There was only one period when satire disappeared from revues, but otherwise nothing happened. He was banned between 1952 and 1955 by the Peronist government.

== Last years ==
In the late 1950s Pepe Arias discovered and fell in love with the resort town of Pinamar. He began to spend much of his time there with his partner Petra, in peace and quiet at their home on Burriquetas Street. Pepe Arias died in his sleep at 5:00 p.m. on 23 February 1967 in Buenos Aires. His last film was La señora del intendente (1967) by Armando Bó, released after his death, where he looked tired beside Isabel Sarli.

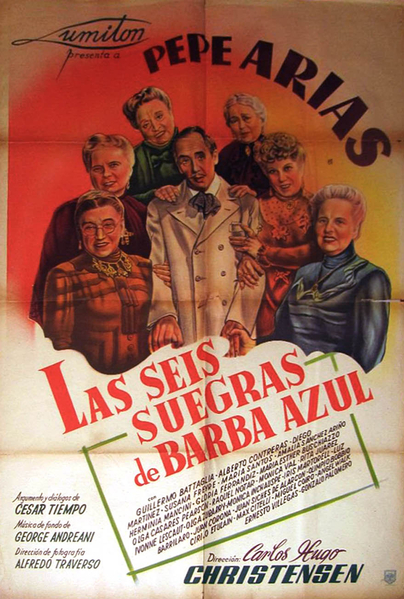
Poster for Las seis suegras de Barba Azul (1945)

== Films ==
Pepe Arias appeared in the following films:

- ¡Tango! (1933) Bonito
- Puerto nuevo (1936)
- El pobre Pérez (1937)
- ¡Segundos afuera! (1937)
- Kilómetro 111 (1938)
- Maestro Levita (1938)
- El Loco Serenata (1939) José / El Gran Dorbal / El Loco Serenata
- El haragán de la familia (1940)
- Flecha de oro (1940)
- El hermano José (1941)
- Napoleón (1941)
- Fantasmas en Buenos Aires (1942)
- El profesor Cero (1942)
- La guerra la gano yo (1943) Rosendo Garcia
- El fabricante de estrellas (1943) Diógenes Rodríguez
- Las seis suegras de Barba Azul (1945)
- La mujer más honesta del mundo (1947)
- Rodríguez supernumerario (1948)
- Todo un héroe (1949)
- Fúlmine (1949)
- Una noche cualquiera (1951)
- Mercado de abasto (1955) Lorenzo Miraglia
- Estrellas de Buenos Aires (1956)
- La mujer del zapatero (1965)
- La señora del intendente (1967) Dr. Amable Gambetta

== Sources ==
- Amuchastegui, Irene (23 February 1997). "Hace 30 años moría Pepe Arias". Clarín. Buenos Aires.
- "Filipipón, filipipona (Nueva versión de la editada el 28 de marzo)". Clarín (in Spanish). 7 April 2008.
- Inzillo, Carlos (1989). "Queridos Filipipones": una bio-filmoradiografía afectiva de Pepe Arias. Ed. Corregidor. p. 227. ISBN 9789500505543.
- Inzillo, Carlos (23 February 1997). "Treinta años sin Pepe Arias". La Nación (in Spanish). Archived from the original on 2014-06-06.
- "Pepe Arias". Cinenacional.
