= Arte Mixto =

Arte Mixto were a six-member Cuban band of the 1990s from Cienfuegos. The band included singer Iris Sandra Cepeda and percussionist Carlos Manuel Veliz. The group's 1997 album Deseos was well received in the US for "light yet intriguing tunes". In 1998, Arte Mixto were on a tour of the US when singer Cepeda sought political asylum forcing the other members of the group to return to Cuba.
