= This Earth Is Mine (1961 film) =

1961 film

- Directed by: Hugo del Carril
- Written by: José Pavlotzky
- Produced by: León Silberman
- Starring: Hugo del Carril
- Cinematography: Francis Boeniger
- Edited by: Gerardo Rinaldi; José Serra
- Release dates: July 1961 (Moscow); 6 November 1961 (Argentina)
- Running time: 100 minutes
- Country: Argentina
- Language: Spanish

This Earth Is Mine (Spanish: Esta tierra es mía) is a 1961 Argentine drama film directed by and starring Hugo del Carril. It was entered into the 2nd Moscow International Film Festival.

== Cast ==
- Hugo del Carril as Laureano Cabral
- Mario Soffici as Anselmi
- Nelly Meden as Gina
- Ricardo Castro Ríos as Renato
- Gloria Ferrandiz
- Carlos Olivieri
- César Tiempo
- Raúl del Valle
- Benito Cibrián
- Félix Tortorelli
- Luis Quiles
