= Crimen entre bastidores =

- Directed by: Francisco Peck
- Release date: 1948
- Country: Argentina
- Language: Spanish

Crimen entre bastidores is a 1948 Argentine crime thriller film directed by Francisco Peck during the classical era of Argentine cinema.

== Cast ==
- Samuel Sanda
- Nora Merlak
- Fernando Labat
- Raúl Wilson
- Fernando Aicardi
- Domingo Gussi
- Mara Balpi
- Rafael Chumbito
- Nicolás Taricano
