= Elena Jordi =

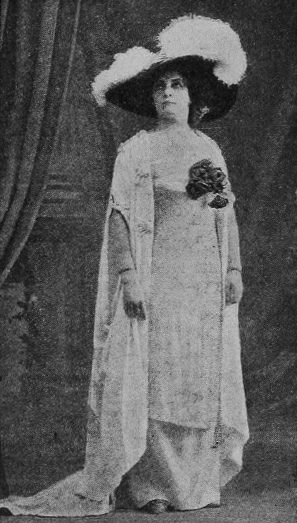
- Jordi in 1910
- Born: 20 November 1882
- Died: 6 December 1945 (aged 63)
- Occupation: Director · Actress
- Spouse: Josep Capellera (m. 1901; div. 1904)
- Children: 2

Elena Jordi (born Montserrat Casals Baque; 20 November 1882 - 6 December 1945) was the first woman in Spain to become a film director. She began her career as an actress and Vaudeville performer.

== Early life and education ==
Jordi was born in the region of Cercs, which is mainly famous for the invention of the sewing machine (berguedana). She was the second of three sisters. Her father was a miner and a caretaker of the cement factories of Cercs. When she turned 18, she joined the cultural society of the bergandana.

== Career ==
She began her career as an actress and Vaudeville performer. She also started her own theater company and became well known in Barcelona. She began acting in the Teatro Español de Barcelona (The Spanish Theatre of Barcelona). She was encouraged by an actor Domenec Ceret to begin her career in film. She started with La loca del Ministerio, which was her first studio films. In 1914 she built her own theatre Teatro Elena Jordi, but ended up in a failure.

== Personal life ==
She got married in 1901 to Josep Capellera, a veterinarian. She had two daughters with Capellara, but the marriage was broken by 1904.

== Filmography ==
- La Loca del Ministerio (actress) - 1916
- Thais (director) -1918
