= La Caraba =

- Directed by: Julio Saraceni
- Release date: 1947
- Running time: 76 minute
- Country: Argentina
- Language: Spanish

La Caraba is a 1947 film of the classical era of Argentine cinema.

== Cast ==
- Olinda Bozán
- Francisco Alvarez
- Armando Bó
- Lidia Denis
- Enrique Roldán
- Perla Mux
- Ángel Walk
- Arturo Arcari
- Arsenio Perdiguero
- Mavi Correa
- María Esther Corán
- Mario Baroffio
- R. A. Laborde

== Production ==
- Director: Julio Saraceni
- Script: Emilio Villalba Welsh y Alejandro Verbitsky after Pedro Muñoz Seca
- Photography: Gumer Barreiros y Antonio Prieto (II)
- Montaje: José Cañizares
- Music: Gregory Stone
- Stage: Germen Gelpi
