= Max Citelli =

Argentinian actor (1923–2007)

- Citelli c. early 1950s
- Born: 22 January 1923; Argentina
- Died: 11 January 2007 (aged 83)
- Occupation: Actor
- Years active: 1936–1959
- Height: 1.83 m (6 ft 0 in)

Max Citelli (22 January 1923 – 11 January 2007) was an Argentine film actor, active during the Golden Age of Argentine cinema between 1936 and 1959. Citelli was born on 22 January 1923, and died on 11 January 2007, at the age of 83.

== Filmography ==
- Mi esqueleto (1959)
- El Festín de Satanás (1958)
- Fantoche (1957)
- Cuando los duendes cazan perdices (1955)
- Mi viudo y yo (1954)
- La tía de Carlitos (1952)
- El Mucamo de la niña (1951)
- Me casé con una estrella (1951)
- Los isleros (1951)
- ¡Qué hermanita! (1951)
- La comedia inmortal (1951)
- Cuidado con las mujeres (1951)
- Mi noche triste (1951)
- The Crime of Oribe (1950) .... Lacava
- Cuando besa mi marido (1950)
- The Seductor (1950)
- Esposa último modelo (1950)
- Piantadino (1950)
- Juan Globo (1949)
- El Extraño caso de la mujer asesinada (1949)
- ¿Por qué mintió la cigüeña? (1949)
- La serpiente de cascabel (1948) .... Damián
- Don Bildigerno de Pago Milagro (1948)
- White Horse Inn (1948)
- Una Atrevida aventurita (1948)
- 27 millones (1947)
- The Little Parade (1947)
- Madame Bovary (1947) .... Sr. Binet
- Con el diablo en el cuerpo (1947)
- El Diablo andaba en los choclos (1946)
- Mrs. Perez and Her Divorce (1945)
- Bluebeard's Six Mothers-in-Law (1945)
- Fuego en la montaña (1943)
- Los Hombres las prefieren viudas (1943)
- Así te quiero (1942)
- El pijama de Adán (1942)
- En el último piso (1942)
- Waiter Number 13 (1941)
- A Good Man (1941)
- Confesión (1940)
- De México llegó el amor (1940)
- El susto que Perez se llevo (1940)
- Honeysuckle (1938)
- El gran camarada (1938)
- The Blue Squadron (1937)
- Santos Vega (1936)
- Juan Moreira (1936)
