= Estudios San Miguel =

Argentine Film Studio (1937-1957)

- View of a shoot at Estudios San Miguel
- Industry: Film production
- Founded: 1937
- Founder: Miguel Machinandiarena
- Defunct: c. 1957
- Headquarters: Buenos Aires, Argentina

Estudios San Miguel (San Miguel Studios) was an Argentine film studio that was active in the 1940s and early 1950s. It flourished during the Golden Age of Argentine cinema, and at its peak was one of the major studios in Buenos Aires. Genres ranged from musical comedy to costume drama and gaucho thriller. Films included La guerra gaucha (The Gaucho War 1942), co-produced with Artistas Argentinos Asociados, and the comedy Juvenilia (1943), both of which won several major awards. Eva Duarte, soon to become the first lady of Argentina as Eva Perón, appeared in two of the studio's films in 1945. The studio became overextended financially and ceased production after 1952.

== History ==
Estudios San Miguel was founded and owned by Miguel Machinandiarena (1899–1975). Machinandiarena was a Basque from Navarre who had emigrated to Argentina in 1915. His family was very wealthy, had large real estate investments and controlled the Casino de Mar del Plata. Miguel Machinandiarena founded the company in 1937 with his brothers Narciso and Silvestre and began to build the studios and laboratories in the town of Bella Vista.

The studio absorbed SIDE (Sociedad Impresora de Discos Electrofónicos), which had pioneered the tango format with a trilogy of films, but failed to establish a solid business model. In 1940 Estudios San Miguel launched its first production, Petróleo, directed by Arturo S. Mom. Machinandiarena was one of the great promoters of the Argentine film industry. For a while the studio was one of the largest Argentine film companies.

The Italian director Catrano Catrani, who emigrated to Argentina in 1937, became artistic director of the studio. He and other directors at the studio were assisted by Catrani's wife, Vlasta Lah, who later directed Las furias (1960) and Las modelos (1963). The set designer and later director Ralph Pappier designed the sets of La guerra gaucha (1942), En el viejo Buenos Aires (1942) and Madame Bovary (1947). In 1944 Pappier created the first special effects department for the studio. Pappier and Homero Manzi made Pobre, me madre querida in 1948. The Peruvian poet and author César Miró was a technical adviser at the studio from 1944 to 1953, when he moved to Paramount Pictures in Hollywood.

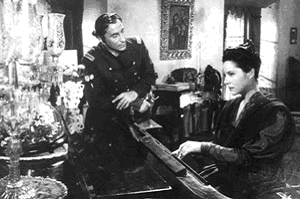
Sebastián Chiola and Amelia Bence in La guerra gaucha (1942)

The future producer and director Hector Olivera joined the studio as an assistant in 1947. Later he moved to Artistas Argentinos Asociados and then became a co-founder of Aries Cinematográfica Argentina in 1956. The scriptwriter, producer and director Enrique Carreras joined the studio when he was very young. He later founded the Productora Cinematográfica General Belgrano in 1949 and directed his first film, El mucamo de la niña in 1951.

The studio's last production was released in 1952. As of 31 December 1954 the studio had a debt of more than six million pesos.

== Noted films ==
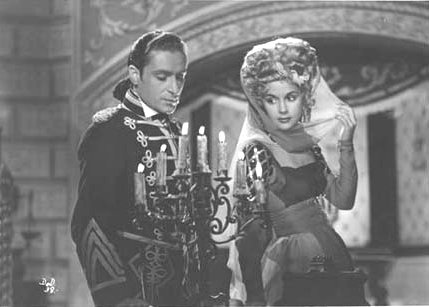
Enrique Diosdado and Delia Garcés in La dama duende (1944)

La guerra gaucha (1942) was an adaptation of a novel by Miguel de Unamuno. The partners at Artistas Argentinos Asociados decided to make the film with their own funds. These proved insufficient and they had to partner with San Miguel Studios and undersell the exhibition rights for the movie earlier in some areas. These decisions allowed them to make the film with "a little less belt-tightening but without splurging". The film was shot almost entirely within the Estudios San Miguel apart from two scenes in the Tigre delta in the Río de la Plata. The film won three Silver Condor awards, including Best Film, Best Director (Lucas Demare), and Best Adapted Screenplay (Ulyses Petit de Murat and Homero Manzior).

The 1943 comedy-drama Juvenilia was directed by Augusto César Vatteone. At the 1944 Argentine Film Critics Association Awards the film won the Silver Condor Award for Best Film. The Argentine Academy of Cinematography Arts and Sciences gave the studio the "Best Picture" award for Juvenilia (1943), La dama duende (1945) and Los isleros (1951). The studio had difficulty with the censors in 1944 over El fin de la noche (End of the Night) which was anti-Nazi, while Argentina was neutral during World War II (1939–45).

The 1945 musical La cabalgata del circo (The Circus Cavalcade) was a vehicle for the female star of the moment, Libertad Lamarque. Due to her performance, the film drew huge audiences. The film also included Eva Duarte, soon to become Eva Perón as wife of the president of Argentina, in a minor role. Eva would arrive late at the studio, and would interrupt the shooting any time she was wanted on the phone, without the director daring to complain. However, Eva's participation made it possible for Machinandiarena to obtain celluloid from the military government's Ministry of Communications. Later in 1945 María Eva Duarte starred in La Pródiga (The Prodigal). On 3 August 1946 Machinandiarena signed over all rights to this film to the president's wife.

In 1945 the studio produced La dama duende (The Phantom Lady), produced by Machinandiarena and directed by Luis Saslavsky, based on a 17th-century cloak-and-dagger comedy by Pedro Calderón de la Barca. The director and the leading lady, Delia Garcés, were Argentine. Otherwise the film was made by Spanish Republican refugees, including the script, decor, cinematography and principal actors.

== Filmography ==
- Petróleo 1940
- Melodías de América (Melodies of America) Musical comedy, 1942
- En el viejo Buenos Aires (In Old Buenos Aires) Comedy, 1942
- Eclipse de sol (Eclipse of the Sun) 1943
- Casa de muñecas (Doll's House) 1943
- Los hombres las prefieren viudas (Men Prefer Widows), 1943
- Juvenilia Comedy-drama, 1943
- Cuando florezca el naranjo (When the Oranges Blossom) 1943
- Los hijos artificiales (The Artificial children) 1943
- Tres hombres del río (Three Men of the River) Crime drama, 1943
- El fin de la noche (End of the Night) Drama, 1944
- Cuando la primavera se equivoca (When Spring Makes a Mistake) 1944
- La cabalgata del circo (The Circus Cavalcade) Musical, 1945
- La pródiga (The Prodigal) 1945
- La dama duende (The Phantom Lady), 1945
- Camino del infierno (Road to Hell) Drama, 1946
- Las tres ratas (The Three Rats) Drama, 1946
- Milagro de amor (Miracle of Love) 1946
- Romance musical (Musical Romance) Musical comedy, 1947
- Madame Bovary Drama, 1947
- La cumparsita (The Little Parade) 1947
- La senda oscura (The Dark Path) 1947
- Vacaciones (Vacations) Comedy romance, 1947
- Don Bildigerno de Pago Milagro 1948
- La serpiente de cascabel (The rattlesnake) Comedy, 1948
- Pobre, mi madre querida (My Poor Beloved Mother) Musical comedy, 1948
- Historia del 900 (A Story of the Nineties) Musical, 1949
- El extraño caso de la mujer asesinada (The Strange Case of the Murdered Woman) 1949
- La barra de la esquina (The Corner Bar) 1950
- El último payador 1950
- Los árboles mueren de pie (Trees Die Standing) 1951
- Los isleros (The Islanders) 1951
- Buenos Aires, mi tierra querida (Buenos Aires, My Beloved Land) 1951
- Si muero antes de despertar (If I Die Before I Wake) 1952
- No abras nunca esa puerta (Don't Ever Open That Door), Thriller, 1952

== Sources ==
- Academia Nacional de la Historia Argentina (2003). Nueva Historia de la Nación Argentina. Buenos Aires: GeoPlaneta.
- "ARCHIVO · Premios Anuales 1941 - 1953" (in Spanish). Academia de Artes y Ciencias Cinematográficas. Archived from the original on 2014-05-31.
- Barnard, Timothy; Rist, Peter (2013-08-21). South American Cinema: A Critical Filmography, 1915-1994. Routledge. ISBN 978-1-136-54548-1.
- Borrás, Eduardo (2006-01-01). Las aguas bajan turbias. Editorial Biblos. ISBN 978-950-786-557-2.
- Cirio, Norberto Pablo (2012). Rita Montero, memorias de piel morena: una afroargentina en el espectáculo. Editorial Dunken. ISBN 978-987-02-6285-5.
- Coll, Edna (1974). Indice informativo de la novela hispanoamericana (in Spanish). La Editorial, UPR. ISBN 978-0-8477-2012-5.
- Contreras, Marily (2003). Niní Marshall: el humor como refugio (in Spanish). Libros del Zorzal. ISBN 978-987-1081-20-2.
- Coscia, Jorge (2012-11-01). Juan y Eva: El amor, el odio y la revolución. La historia de amor jamás contada. Penguin Random House Grupo Editorial Argentina. ISBN 978-950-07-4065-4.
- Elena, Alberto (2005). Cruces de destinos. Intercambios cinematográficos entre España y América Latina. Liceus, Servicios de Gestió. ISBN 978-84-9822-220-3.
- Elena, Alberto; Diaz Lopez, Marina (2012-08-07). The Cinema of Latin America. Wallflower Press. ISBN 978-0-231-50194-1.
- Gilbert, Isidoro (2011-06-01). La Fede: Alistándose para la revolución. La federación juvenil comunista 1921-2005 (in Spanish). Penguin Random House Grupo Editorial Argentina. ISBN 978-950-07-3412-7.
- Girona i Albuixec, Albert; Fernanda Mancebo, María (1995). El exilio valenciano en América. Obra y memoria (in Spanish). Universitat de València. ISBN 978-84-370-2312-0.
- Gutierrez Pechemiel, Ismael C. (2005). Los bienes del ex dictador. Editorial Dunken. ISBN 978-987-02-1520-2.
- "Juvenilia" (in Spanish). Cinenacional.com.
- Kriger, Clara (2009). Cine y Peronismo. El estado en escena. Buenos Aires: Siglo XXI Editores. ISBN 978-987-629-085-2.
- "Los ganadores, año por año" (in Spanish). Cine.ar. Archived from the original on 13 August 2014.
- Morató, Cristina (2010-11-12). Divas rebeldes: María Callas, Coco Chanel, Audrey Hepburn, Jackie Kennedy y otras mujeres. Penguin Random House Grupo Editorial España. ISBN 978-84-01-39099-9.
- Oliveri, Ricardo García (1994). Lucas Demare (in Spanish). Centro Editor de América Latina.
- Plazaola, Luis Trelles (1989-01-01). South American Cinema/ Cine De America Del Sur: Dictionary of Film Makers/ Diccionario De Los Productores De Peliculas. La Editorial, UPR. ISBN 978-0-8477-2011-8.
- Ricagno, Alejandro; Bence, Amelia (2001). "toda una mujer / une vraie femme". Cinémas d'Amérique Latine (in Spanish) (9). Presses Universitaires du Midi. JSTOR 42598768.
- Zolezzi, Emilio (2006). Noticias del viejo cine criollo (in Spanish). Buenos Aires: Ediciones Lumiere S.A. ISBN 987-603-018-3.
