= Antonio Momplet =

Spanish screenwriter and director

- Born: Antonio Momplet Guerra; 1899; Cádiz, Andalusia, Spain
- Died: 19 August 1974 (aged 74–75); Cadaqués, Catalonia, Spain
- Occupation: Filmmaker
- Years active: 1935–1964

Antonio Momplet (1899 – 10 August 1974) was a Spanish film director and screenwriter. He worked in Spain, France, Argentina (during the Golden Age of Argentine cinema) and Mexico.

== Life and career ==
Antonio Momplet was born in Cádiz, Andalusia. He worked as a journalist and translator of foreign films in Barcelona until 1927, when he moved to Paris and began to work for Gaumont. In the mid-1930s he moved back to Spain where he directed four feature films and founded the film journal Cine Art, which quickly became influential. To avoid the Spanish Civil War, he moved to Argentina in 1937, and made eight feature films the following years. In 1943 he moved to Mexico to join the film industry there, and made a number of Mexican films both as director and writer for others, before he moved back to Buenos Aires in 1946. In 1952 he returned to Spain. During his final Spanish period he made films such as the Spaghetti Western parody Due contro tutti, before he retired in 1964. He settled in Cadaqués where he died in 1974.

== Filmography ==
Director

- La farándula (1935)
- Hombres contra hombres (1937)
- La millona (1937)
- Turbión (1938)
- El hermano José (1941)
- Novios para las muchachas (1941)
- En el viejo Buenos Aires (1942)
- Los hijos artificiales (1943)
- Amok (1944)
- Remolino de pasión (1945)
- Dizziness (Vértigo) (1946)
- Bel Ami (1947)
- La cumparsita (1947)
- A media luz (1947)
- La otra y yo (1949)
- Yo no elegí mi vida (1949)
- Toscanito y los detectives (1950)
- Café Cantante (1951)
- La mujer sin lágrimas (1951)
- La hija del mar (1953)
- Viento del norte (1954)
- Buongiorno primo amore! (1957)
- Las de Caín (1959)
- Julia y el celacanto (1961)
- The Invincible Gladiator (El gladiador invencible) (1962)
- Due contro tutti (1962)

Writer

- Petróleo (1936)
- Hombres contra hombres (1937)
- La millona (1937)
- Turbión (1939)
- Napoleón (1941)
- Los hijos artificiales (1943)
- Amok (1944)
- El corsario negro (1944)
- He Who Died of Love (1945)
- Lágrimas de sangre (1946)
- La mujer de todos (1946)
- Vértigo (1947)
- A media luz (1947)
- Café Cantante (1951)
- Viento del norte (1954)
- Julia y el celacanto (1961)
- Jandro (1965)
- The Invincible Gladiator (El gladiador invencible) (1962)
