= Catrano Catrani =

Italian-Argentine film director and producer

Catrano M. Catrani
- Born: October 31, 1910; Città di Castello, Umbria, Italy
- Died: December 19, 1974 (aged 64); Buenos Aires, Argentina
- Occupation(s): Film director Producer
- Spouse: Vlasta Lah

Catrano M. Catrani (October 31, 1910 — December 19, 1974) was an Italian-Argentine film director and producer.

Catrani was born in 1910 in Città di Castello, Umbria, Italy. He studied film at the Centro Sperimentale di Cinematografia in Rome. He emigrated to Argentina in 1937 and settled in Buenos Aires, where he joined San Miguel Studios. He directed many short advertising films and documentaries, and in 1942 he completed his first major work, the comedy En el último piso with Zully Moreno as the lead.

His first big success was Alto Paraná, a costumbrista comedy screenwritten by novelist Velmiro Ayala Gauna, with Ubaldo Martínez in the lead role as Frutos Gómez, a sardonic and astute policeman. In 1963, he directed La fusilación or El último montonero, co-written with Félix Luna and with music by Ariel Ramírez, about the bloody death of caudillo Ángel Vicente Peñaloza, which won the prize for best director at the San Sebastian International Film Festival.

He died on December 19, 1974, in Buenos Aires, Argentina.

== Filmography ==
=== As director ===
- En el último piso (1942)
- Llegó la niña Ramona (1945)
- Los hijos del otro (1947)
- Los secretos del buzón (1948)
- Lejos del cielo (1950)
- La Comedia inmortal (1951)
- Mujeres en sombra (1951)
- Codicia (1955)
- Al sur del paralelo 42 (1955)
- Alto Paraná (1958)
- Álamos talados (1960)
- El último montonero (1963)
- Santiago querido! (1965)
- Tacuara y Chamorro, pichones de hombres (1967)
- He nacido en la ribera (1972)
- ¿De quiénes son las mujeres? (1972)
