= Alberto Bello =

Argentine actor

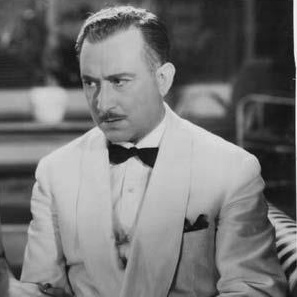
- Alberto Bello in 1945.
- Born: 22 June 1897; Buenos Aires, Argentina
- Died: December 11, 1963 (aged 66); Buenos Aires, Argentina
- Occupation: Actor
- Years active: 1935 - 1963 (film)

Alberto Bello (1897–1963) was an Argentine actor who appeared in more than 40 films during his career including Madame Bovary (1947). He committed suicide by throwing himself under a train.

== Selected filmography ==
- Marriage in Buenos Aires (1940)
- Isabelita (1940)
- El tesoro de la isla Maciel (1941)
- El Fin de la Noche (1944)
- Back in the Seventies (1945)
- Road of Hell (1946)
- The Gambler (1947)
- Madame Bovary (1947)
- The Black Market (1953)

== Bibliography ==
- Goble, Alan. The Complete Index to Literary Sources in Film. Walter de Gruyter, 1999.
