= Joaquín Abati =

Spanish writer (1865–1936)

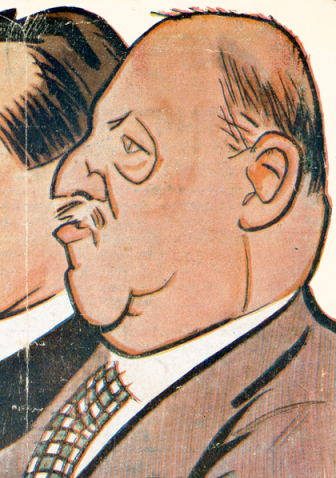
La Novela Teatral, Antonio Paso y Joaquín Abati, Tovar (cropped) Joaquín Abati

Joaquín Abatí y Díaz (29 June 1865, in Madrid – 30 July 1936) was a Spanish writer and Zarzuela Librettist.

== Education and career ==
Joaquín Abatí was born to an Italian father and a Spanish mother. He studied law and, though licensed, he never practised. He published a book entitled Respuestas a los Temas de Derecho Administrativo (Responses to Issues of Administrative Law), intended to help those who had to deal with these issues. Curiously, he never managed to practise any of the principles although the book was helpful to many of those who had used his book. For this reason he decided to leave the legal profession and devote himself to literature, that appealed to him more.

== Artistic career ==
Abatí's first play was the comic sketch Entre doctores (Among doctors), which premiered at the Teatro Lara in 1892. This was followed by works from simple monologues, humorous in nature, such as El Conde Sisebuto (The Sisebuto Count) and Las cien doncellas (The hundred maidens) to pieces with three or more acts, some in collaboration with Carlos Arniches.

He was a prolific author and achieved successes and produced more than 120 titles, resulting in him being regarded as a writer of the highest rank in his time. His works include El debut de la chica (The girl's debut), La conquista de México (The Conquest of Mexico), Doña Juanita (written in collaboration with Francisco Flores Garcia), Genio y figura (1910), No te ofendas (No offense), Beatriz (1920) (both with Carlos Arniches), España nueva (New Spain), El Conde de Lavapies (The Count of Lavapies) and La Viuda alegre (The Merry Widow).

He excelled in his role as author of operettas, a field in which he collaborated with other authors such as Carlos Arniches and Antonio Paso.

Several of his plays were intended as operetta booklets, such as Los amarillos (The yellow ones), a one-act piece, La corte de Risalia (The Risalia Court) in two acts, La mujer artificial (The artificial woman), La mulata (The mulatto woman) and his most famous work, El asombro de Damasco (The wonder of Damascus), which he wrote in collaboration with Antonio Cano Paso and to which Maestro Pablo Luna put music and premiered it in 1916.

== Legal career ==
Abatí returned to practising law and became professor at the Real Academia de Jurisprudencia y Legislación.

Joaquín Abatí died in Madrid in 1936.

== Operettas and lyrical works ==
- 1899– Los Besugos (the Breams) (Emilio Mario; Music, Valverde)
- 1900– Los Amarillos (the Yellow ones) (Francisco Flores García; Music, Saco del Valle)
- 1901– Tierra por medio (Through) (Sinesio Delgado; Music, Chapí)
- El Código penal (The penal code) (Eusebio Sierra; Music, Tomás Barrera)
- 1904– El Trébol (The Clover) (Antonio Paso Cano; Music, Serrano)
- 1905– La Mulata (The Mulatto) (Antonio Paso Cano; Music, Valverde)
- 1906– La Marcha real (The Royal March) (Antonio Paso Cano; Music, Vives)
- La Taza de thé (The cup of tea) (Antonio Paso Cano y Maximiliano Thous; Music, Lleó)
- El Aire (The air) (Antonio Paso Cano; Music, Lleó y Mariani)
- 1907– La Hostería del Laurel (The Laurel Inn) (Antonio Paso Cano; Music, Lleó)
- 1908– Mayo florido (May flower) (Antonio Paso Cano; Music, Lleó)
- 1909– Los Hombres alegres (The happy men) (Antonio Paso Cano; Music, Lleó)
- Los Perros de presa (Attack dogs) (Antonio Paso Cano; Music, López Torregrosa)
- 1910– La Partida de la porra (The Departure of the baton) (Antonio Paso Cano; Music, Lleó)
- Los Viajes de Gullivert (Gulliver's travels) (Antonio Paso Cano; Music, Giménez)
- Mea Culpa (My fault) (Antonio Paso Cano; Music, Lleó)
- 1911– La Gallina de los huevos de oro (The hen that lays golden eggs) (Antonio Paso Cano; Music, Vives)
- El Verbo amar (The word love) (Antonio Paso Cano; Music, López Torregrosa)
- 1913– Baldomero Pachón (Antonio Paso Cano; Music, Alonso)
- El orgullo de Albacete (The pride of Albacete).
- 1914– La Corte de Risalia (The Risalia Court) (Antonio Paso Cano; Music, Luna)
- El Dichoso verano (The Blessed Summer) (Antonio Paso Cano; Music, Alonso)
- España Nueva (New Spain) (Antonio Paso Cano; Music, Lleó)
- El Potro salvaje (The Wild Pony) (Antonio Paso Cano; Music, Quinito Valverde y Luna)
- 1915– La Cena de los húsares (The Hussar's Dinner) (Antonio Paso Cano; Music, Vives)
- Sierra Morena () (Antonio Paso Cano; Music, Lleó)
- El Velón de Lucena (The Velon of Lucena) (Antonio Paso Cano; Music, Alonso)
- Las Alegres colegialas (The Merry schoolgirls) (Antonio Paso Cano; Music, Lleó)
- 1916– El Asombro de Damasco (The Wonder of Damascus) (Antonio Paso Cano, Music, Luna)
- 1918– La Mujer artificial (The Artificial Woman) (Carlos Arniches; Music Luna)
- 1920– El Conde de Lavapiés (The Count of Lavapiés) (Carlos Arniches; Music, Calleja Gómez)
- 1931– La Princesa Tarambana (Princess Tarambana) (Carlos Arniches, Abatí; Music, Francisco Alonso)

=== Monologues ===
- Causa criminal (criminal Cause)
- La buena crianza o tratado de urbanidad (Good parenting or attempt at civility)
- Un hospital (A hospital) (with Emilio Mario, hijo)
- La cocinera (The cook)
- El himeneo (The Hymen)
- El Conde Sisebuto (Count Sisebuto)
- El debut de la chica (The girl's debut) (with Antonio Paso)
- La pata de gallo ()The crow's feet (with Antonio Paso)

== Single act comedies ==
- Entre Doctores (Among Doctors)
- Azucena (Lily)
- Ciertos son los toros (Some are bulls)
- Condenado en costas (Condemned in costs)
- El otro Mundo (The other World) (with Carlos Arniches)
- La conquista de Méjico (The conquest of Mexico)
- Los litigantes (Litigants)
- La enredadera (The vine)
- De la China (From China) (with Emilio Mario, hijo)
- Aquilino Primero (Aquilino the First) (with Emilio Vaamonde)
- El intérprete (The interpreter) (with Emilio Mario, hijo)
- El aire (Air) (with Antonio Paso)
- Los vecinos (The neighbours) (with Antonio Paso)

== Two-act comedies ==
- Doña Juanita (with Francisco Flores García)
- Los niños (Children)
- El Paraíso (The paradise) (with Antonio Paso)
- La mar salada (The salty sea)

== Three-act comedies ==
- Tortosa y Soler ((in English): Tortosa and Soler) (with Federico Reparaz)
- El 30 de Infantería ((in English): The 30th Infantry) (with Luis de Olive)
- Los hijos artificiales ((in English): Artificial Children) (with Federico Reparaz, adapted into the 1943 film Artificial Sons)
- Fuente tónica ((in English): Tonic fountain) (with Emilio Vaamonde)
- Alsina y Ripoll ((in English): Alsina and Ripoll) (with Eusebio Sierra)
- Los reyes del tocino ((in English): Kings of bacon) (Written under a pseudonym, with Emilio Mario hijo)
- El gran tacaño ((in English): The great miser) (with Antonio Paso)
- Genio y figura ((in English): Genius and figure) (with Carlos Arniches, Enrique García Alvarez and Antonio Paso)
- La alegría de vivir ((in English): The joy of living) (with Antonio Paso)
- La divina providencia ((in English): Divine Providence) (with Antonio Paso)
- El Premio Nobel ((in English): The Nobel Prize) (with Carlos Arniches)
- El cabeza de familia ((in English): The householder) (with Antonio Paso)
- La Piqueta ((in English): The Pickaxe) (with Antonio Paso)
- El tren rápido ((in English): The fast train) (with Antonio Paso and Ricardo Viguera)
