= Así te deseo =

- Screenshot
- Directed by: Belisario García Villar
- Written by: Belisario García Villar
- Produced by: Belisario García Villar
- Starring: Roberto Airaldi
- Cinematography: Hugo Chiesa
- Edited by: Nicolás Proserpio
- Release date: February 18, 1948
- Running time: 85 minutes
- Country: Argentina
- Language: Spanish

Así te deseo is a 1948 Argentine drama film directed and written by Belisario García Villar during the classical era of Argentine cinema.

== Cast ==
- Roberto Airaldi
- Anaclara Bell
- Daniel de Alvarado
- Carmen Idal
- Carlos Morganti
- Angelina Pagano
- Amalia Sánchez Ariño
- Ernesto Vilches
