= Hugo del Carril =

Argentine film actor, director and singer

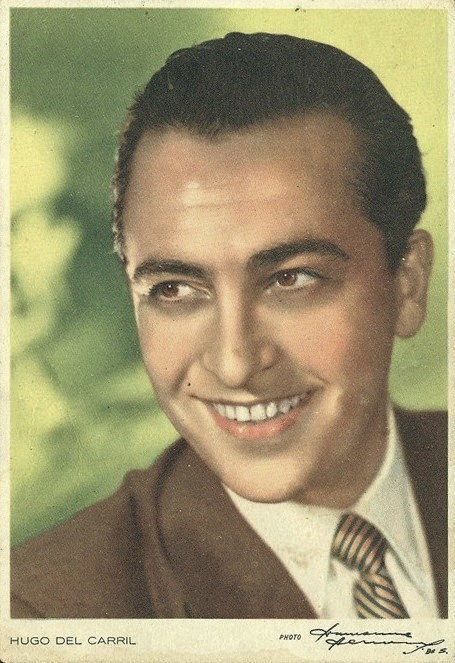
- Hugo del Carril by Annemarie Heinrich
- Born: Pierre Bruno Hugo Fontana; 30 November 1912; Buenos Aires, Argentina
- Died: 13 August 1989 (aged 76)

Pierre Bruno Hugo Fontana, otherwise known as Hugo del Carril (30 November 1912 – 13 August 1989), was an Argentine film actor, film director and tango singer of the Golden Age of Argentine cinema.

== Early life ==
Born in Buenos Aires, del Carril was the son of parents of a rich economic position, his mother Orsolina Bertani was born in Argentina (daughter of the Italian Anarchist Orsini Bertani), but his father Hugo Fontana was an Italian architect, born in Milan. His parents separated, and young Hugo was left in the charge of a family friend.

== Career ==
Del Carril originally began as a popular personality on Argentine radio, and parlayed that into a film career that began in late 1936. He was an immediate hit, and developed into one of Argentina's major film stars. He made some 50 film appearances as an actor between then and his retirement in 1976 but he turned to directing in 1949 and simultaneously directed, acted and produced many of his films becoming one of the industry's highest earners of the period. In 1952 he directed the widely acclaimed Argentine film, Las Aguas Bajan Turbias, known as "River of Blood" in English. He also sang the "Peronist March" (Marcha Peronista), which served as the anthem of the Peronist movement. Del Carril was himself a committed Peronist and was briefly blacklisted and sent into exile in Mexico following Peron's overthrow in 1955.

His 1961 film Esta tierra es mía was entered into the 2nd Moscow International Film Festival.

He died in 1989.

== Filmography ==
=== Actor ===
Hugo del Carril in 1950

- El canto cuenta su historia (1976)
- La malavida (1973)
- Siempre fuimos compañeros (1973)
- Amalio Reyes, un hombre (1970)
- ¡Viva la vida! (1969)
- El día que me quieras (1969)
- Buenas noches, Buenos Aires (1964)
- La sentencia (1964)
- La calesita (1963)
- Esta tierra es mía (1961)
- Amorina (1961)
- Buenos días, Buenos Aires (corto - 1960)
- Culpable (1960)
- The White Land (1959)
- Más allá del olvido (1956)
- El último perro (1956)
- Vida nocturna (1955)
- Las aguas bajan turbias (1952)
- Surcos de sangre (1950)
- El último payador (1950)
- A Story of the Nineties (1949)
- My Poor Beloved Mother (1948)
- Buenos Aires Sings (1947)
- A media luz (Salón Fru Fru) (1947)
- The Associate (1946)
- The Circus Cavalcade (1945)
- Los dos rivales (1944)
- La piel de zapa (1943)
- Pasión imposible (1943)
- Amor último modelo (1942)
- Story of a Poor Young Man (1942)
- When the Heart Sings (1941)
- By the Light of a Star (1941)
- The Song of the Suburbs (1941)
- Confesión (1940)
- The Tango Star (1940)
- Gente bien (1939)
- The Life of Carlos Gardel (1939)
- La vida es un tango (1939)
- Honeysuckle (1938)
- Three Argentines in Paris (1938)
- La vuelta de Rocha (1937)
- The Boys Didn't Wear Hair Gel Before (1937)

=== Director ===
- Yo maté a Facundo (1975)
- Buenas noches, Buenos Aires (1964)
- La sentencia (1964)
- La calesita (1963)
- Esta tierra es mía (1961)
- Amorina (1961)
- Culpable (1960)
- The White Land (1959)
- Una cita con la vida (1958)
- Más allá del olvido (1956)
- La Quintrala, doña Catalina de los Ríos y Lisperguer (1955)
- Las aguas bajan turbias (1952)
- Surcos de sangre (1950)
- A Story of the Nineties (1949)

=== Screenwriter ===
- Yo maté a Facundo (1975)
- Historia del 900 (1949)

=== Producer ===
- Buenas noches, Buenos Aires (1964)
- La sentencia (1964)
- La calesita (1963)
- Las tierras blancas (1959)
- Una cita con la vida (1958)
- Más allá del olvido (1956)
- La Quintrala, doña Catalina de los Ríos y Lisperguer (1955)
- Surcos de sangre (1950)
- Historia del 900 (1949)

== Bibliography ==
- Finkielman, Jorge. The Film Industry in Argentina: An Illustrated Cultural History. McFarland, 2003.
- Rist, Peter H. Historical Dictionary of South American Cinema. Rowman & Littlefield, 2014.
