= Twenty-Four Hours in the Life of a Woman (disambiguation) =

Twenty-Four Hours in the Life of a Woman is a 1927 novel by Stefan Zweig

Twenty-Four or 24 Hours in the Life of a Woman may also refer to:

- 24 Hours in the Life of a Woman (1931 film), 1931 German film
- 24 Hours in the Life of a Woman (1944 film), 1944 French film
- 24 Hours in the Life of a Woman (1968 film), 1968 French film
- 24 Hours in the Life of a Woman (2002 film), 2002 French film

== See also ==
- 24 Hours of a Woman's Life, 1952 British film
