= That's the Woman I Want =

1950 Venezuelan-Argentine comedy film

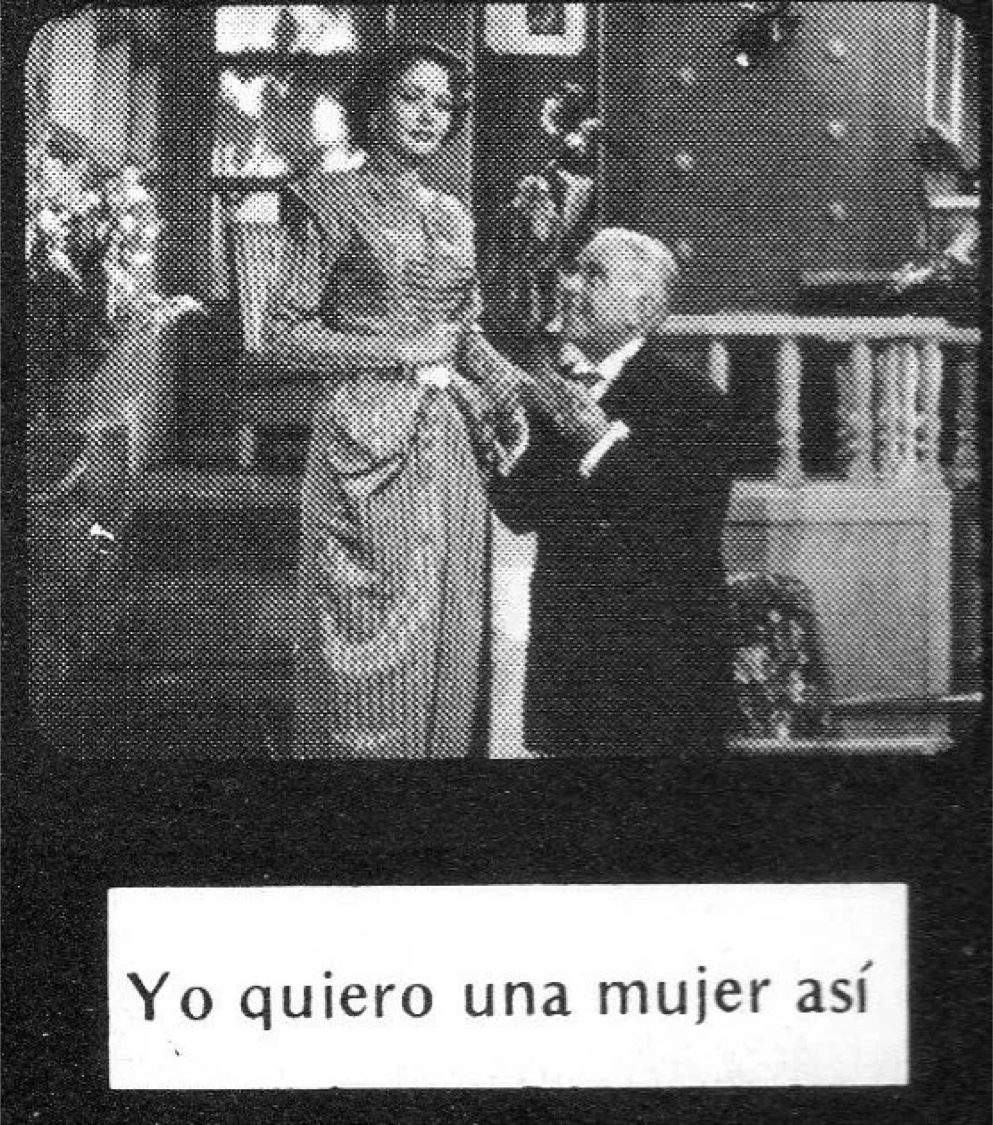
- Yo quiero una mujer así (Spanish)
- Directed by: Juan Carlos Thorry
- Written by: Aquiles Nazoa; Juan Corona
- Starring: Olga Zubarry; Francisco Álvarez; Amador Bendayán; Héctor Monteverde; Luis Salazar
- Production company: Bolívar Films
- Release date: 23 August 1950 (Venezuela)
- Country: Venezuela
- Language: Spanish

That's the Woman I Want (Spanish:Yo quiero una mujer así) is a 1950 Venezuelan-Argentine comedy film directed by Juan Carlos Thorry and starring Olga Zubarry, Francisco Álvarez, Héctor Monteverde and Amador Bendayán. It was Thorry's directorial debut, though he had gone to Venezuela to act, and was commercially successful. The film has been analyzed as part of Venezuelan film history, in particular by Central University of Venezuela academic María Gabriela Colmenares.

== Plot ==
Lindolfo Chaves is the president of a Havana-based tobacco company, but also president of a group dedicated to virtue and morals. In reality, he is an incorrigible libertine until, after a wild night out, his doctor diagnoses him with a heart murmur and advises him to rest somewhere peaceful. Lindolfo goes to his nephew's, lawyer Ruperto Chaves, house in Caracas.

However, Ruperto is not prepared for Lindolfo's arrival: as well as having serious economic problems, his recently released wife Ana María has decided to leave him after a heated argument concerning Lindolfo's apparent moralistic and demure character. Ruperto looks for her, promptly finding Silvia, their dressmaker. Desperate, Ruperto proposes that she temporarily pretend to be his wife.

Silvia accepts the offer and, with the help of Ruperto's butler Sócrates, the three characters play out the farce in front of Uncle Lindolfo. He believes the ruse and ends up naming his nephew president of a new branch of his tobacco company that is being set up in Venezuela. Ana María then returns home to apologize, but then threatens her husband to reveal everything to Lindolfo when they tell her of the act. At the same time, Vuitremundo, an aspirational singer and Silvia's fiancé, has been looking for her for several hours, coming to fight Ruperto because he thinks he has kidnapped her.

== Cast ==
- Olga Zubarry as Ana María
- Francisco Álvarez as Lindolfo Chaves
- Héctor Monteverde as Vuitremundo
- Amador Bendayán as Sócrates
- Luis Salazar as Ruperto Chaves
- Elena Fernán as Silvia
- Leon Bravo
- Esther Monasterio
- Pura Vargas
- Amparo Riera
- Luis Zamora
- Carmen Porras
- Martha Olivo
- Renny Ottolina

== Production ==
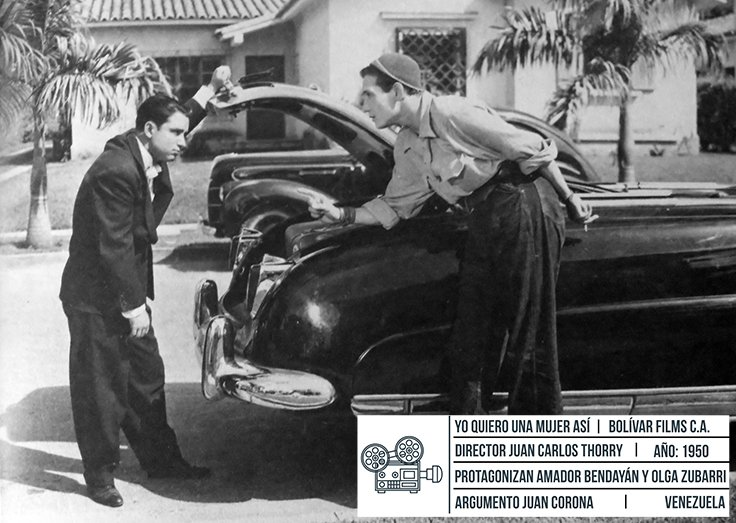
A frame from a scene in the film, preserved in Venezuelan archives

The director of That's the Woman I Want, Juan Carlos Thorry, was one of a group of filmmakers brought to Venezuela from Argentina and Mexico by film company Bolívar Films, which had seen some success producing shorts and newsreels. Bolívar Films intended to invigorate the national film production with features in the late 1940s and early 1950s. The Argentine Thorry had starred in his compatriot Carlos Hugo Christensen's Venezuela-produced film El demonio es un ángel, which was released the same year (1950) as That's the Woman I Want, which also stars an Argentine actor in the main role. The film was the first to be directed by Thorry.

In about 1995, Thorry recalled how the film came to be. Having been in the group summoned to Venezuela, he had only intended to act, however, after El demonio es un ángel and while director Christensen began filming The Yacht Isabel Arrived This Afternoon, Thorry found himself with three months to spare. Having been an assistant director on some productions in Argentina, he was encouraged by producers to use the time as an opportunity to create his own feature film in Venezuela. He received the approval of the production company, and had Juan Corona's story in mind when he briefly returned to Buenos Aires to hire Olga Zubarry and Francisco Álvarez. He then passed the story to the Venezuelan poet and comic Aquiles Nazoa to adapt as a screenplay, and hired Venezuelan actors for the other roles and used the same crew from El demonio es un ángel. This movement of Argentine stars for the film was reported on by Variety in early 1950, in regards to the national Argentine film production unit expanding to the United States – Variety contrasted the news with the fact that "from time to time more Argentine talent clippers off to Venezuela for work [at] Bolívar Films" with the "latest departures [of] Olga Zubarry and comedian Francisco Álvarez"; it refers to the film with the direct English translation I Want a Wife Like That.

Some of the film was shot in La Guaira, specifically scenes of Lindolfo arriving at the airport and Ruperto driving him up the mountains to enter the city of Caracas. It features music by Billo's Caracas Boys and composer Eduardo Serrano.

== Marketing and release ==
María Gabriela Colmenares of Central University of Venezuela looks at the marketing and release of the film as part of its paratext and of Bolívar Films' commercial strategy. She writes that the published materials prior to the film's release follow a pattern similar to the studio system and star system of Hollywood. In terms of the film, the marketing had "explicit genre labels, [...] elements such as the production company and the participation of national artists and international stars" as well as slogans. Some of these slogans explicitly promoted the Venezuelan composer Eduardo Serrano, while others took on the style of a notice to advertise the leisure opportunity of cinema, one reading: "Forget the war and the earthquakes and foot-and-mouth disease watching the comic hit of the year! [...] 99 minutes of unbroken laughter!" Some of the promotions of the film before its release also include newspaper interviews, which lean more into the 'star' aspect by introducing Argentine actor Francisco Álvarez as "the popular comedian". This form of marketing also highlighted the "accentuated local flavor" of the film's Venezuelan setting as an attraction of it.

In terms of distribution, she writes that Bolívar Films had a good handle on the commercialization of its films, but was weaker in the market as it did not have a distribution-exhibition branch of its own. Unlike other Venezuelan attempts at production houses, Bolívar Films was not afraid to market to outside of its country as well as the local market.

Regarding the press release issued by Bolívar Films on the day of the premiere, Colmenares explains that it "[highlighted] its industrial creation, production values and the seal of the production company, [referred] to musical attractions, [...] the comic situations of the plot and the comic feats of some of its actors", writing both of the fame of its international stars and the successful debuts of the Venezuelans. The film was successful, staying in Caracas cinemas for two weeks. This would have been very lucrative, but the typical arrangement of the time was for the production to only receive a quarter of the profits.

== Analysis ==
Colmenares writes that "the analysis of That's the Woman I Want [...] shows great pitfalls derived from the unavailability of studies on comedy as a genre", but that comedy was important within production at the time nevertheless. Colmenares then examines the genre of the film, writing that the plot is driven by a hypocrisy and moral double standard in some of its characters and by the humorous use of a more-stable facade by others, explaining that "ambiguity, deception and impersonation articulate the whole story" until the plots are resolved and truth uncovered. She concludes that the film, therefore, demonstrates the "beliefs and values of the petty bourgeoisie". In terms of storytelling, Colmenares notes the use of dramatic irony and juxtaposition, saying that:

...much of the film's comedy depends on the viewers' ability to contrast the actions and reactions of the characters; on the other hand, the alternating editing in conjunction with the entrances and exits of the characters in situations that threaten the revelation of identities and the end of the farce, creates a suspense that, wisely managed, reinforces the interest of the spectator...

— María Gabriela Colmenares, Diversidad en los estudios cinematográficos, p. 38

Colmenares compliments the use of this system, but notes that the film feels "disharmonious" because of a disparity between the styles of the Venezuelan and Argentine actors in it.

In his thesis, Jesús Ricardo Azuaga García adds to Colmenares' analysis by writing that "the truth is that this comedy tries to respond [...] to a mode of representation institutionalized by Hollywood and followed by the Argentine industry", aligning the format whereby viewers know even the characters' most hidden secrets and those between the lines to a United States ideal. Azuaga García also notes that That's the Woman I Want, along with The Yacht Isabel Arrived This Afternoon, are "the most representative, due to the reception they received from public and critics," of Venezuelan popular film in the early development period, but it is harder to tell how it relates to the typical Argentine films of the time. However, he still says that in certain canons it is classed in the generic style of Argentine comedy.

In 2009, Colmenares observed the credits of the film, writing that the style of them "authorized the reading of [the film] in comic terms" by the use of "drawings and animated cartoons that represent the characters of the plot" and "music that [...] is cheerful and goes from tropical to playful" among other light sounds.

== Sources ==
- Alvaray, Luisela (2009). "Melodrama and the emergence of Venezuelan cinema". In Sadlier, Darlene J. (ed.). Latin American Melodrama: Passion, Pathos, and Entertainment. Champaign, Illinois: University of Illinois Press. pp. 33–49. ISBN 9780252034640. JSTOR 10.5406/j.ctt1xcrbr.6. OCLC 316232668 – via Scribd.
- Azuaga García, Jesús Ricardo (2015). Pandemonium: La Filmografia de Roman Chalbaud en el Cine Venezolano: Contexto y Analisis [Pandemonium: The Filmography of Roman Chalbaud and the Cinema of Venezuela] (PDF) (Thesis) (in Spanish). Valencia: Universitat de Valencia.
- Colmenares, María Gabriela (2005). Azuaga, Ricardo (ed.). Diversidad en los estudios cinematográficos [Diversity in film studies] (in Spanish) (1 ed.). Caracas: Fondo Editorial de Humanidades y Educación, Universidad Central de Venezuela. ISBN 980-00-2245-7. OCLC 64336979.
- Colmenares, María Gabriela (2009a). "El paratexto y la construcción de la imagen genérica en los largometrajes de Bolívar Films (Venezuela, 1949-1955)" [Paratext and the construction of generic image in the feature films of Bolívar Films (Venezuela, 1949-1955)] (in Spanish). Caracas: X Jornadas de investigación Humanística y Educativa. pp. 74–97.
- Colmenares, María Gabriela (2009b). Herrera, Bernardino (ed.). "El paradigma del cine industrial y su imitación en los largometrajes de Bolívar Films (Venezuela, 1949-1955)" [Paradigm of industrial cinema and its imitation in the feature films of Bolívar Films]. Extramuros (in Spanish) (30). Caracas: Fondo Editorial de Humanidades y Educación, Universidad Central de Venezuela: 155–177. ISSN 1316-7480.
- Gallina, Mario (2017). "Juan Carlos Thorry". In Ormaechea, Luis (ed.). Homenajes II. Buenos Aires: Festival Internacional de Cine de Mar del Plata. pp. 60–73 – via Issuu.
- León Frías, Isaac (2019). Más allá de las lágrimas: Espacios habitables en el cine clásico de México y Argentina [Beyond tears: Livable spaces in the classic cinema of Mexico and Argentina] (in Spanish). Lima: Fondo editorial Universidad de Lima. ISBN 9789972454868.
- La Guaira en Retrospectiva (13 March 2016). "Película Venezolana: Yo quiero una mujer así, en los escenario..." [Venezuelan film: Yo quiero una mujer así, on the scene...]. Facebook (in Spanish). La Guaira.
- La Nacion (13 February 2000). "La escena está de luto: murió Thorry" [The stage is in mourning: Thorry has died] (in Spanish). Buenos Aires.
- Variety (31 January 1950). "Arg. Pix Producers Setting Up Single Distrib Unit in the U.S. With 400G". New York.
