= Olga Zubarry =

Argentine actress (1929–2012)

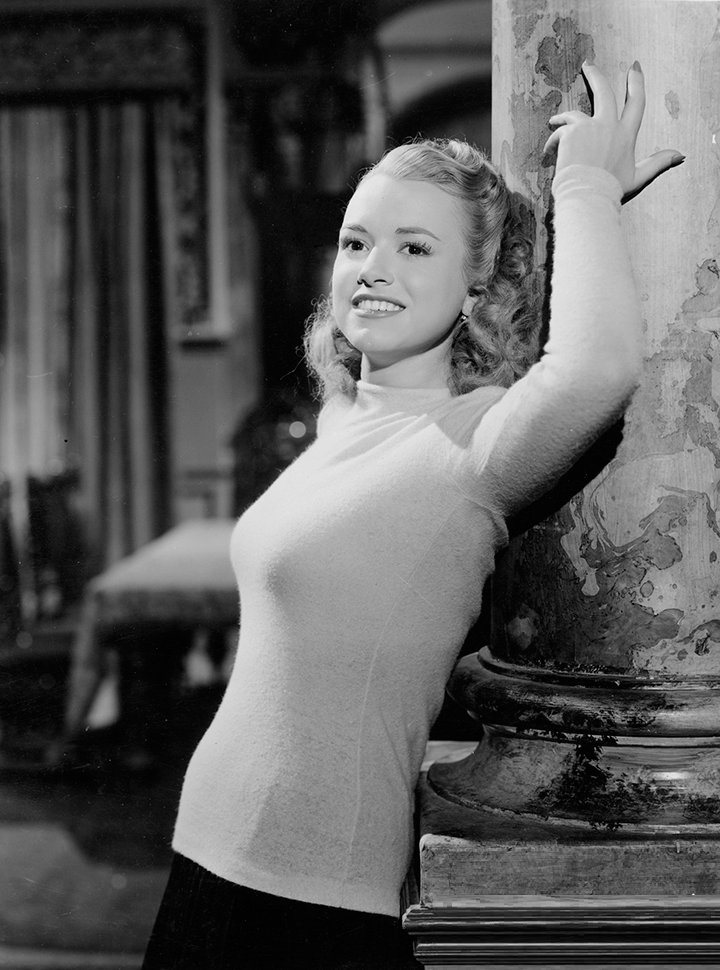
- Zubarry in La muerte camina en la lluvia (1948)
- Born: Olga Adela Zubiarraín; 30 October 1929; Parque de los Patricios, Buenos Aires, Argentina
- Died: 15 December 2012 (aged 83); Buenos Aires, Argentina
- Occupation: Actress
- Years active: 1943–1997
- Known for: First Argentine film with partial nudity
- Notable work: El ángel desnudo

Olga Zubarry (30 October 1929 – 15 December 2012) was an Argentine actress who appeared in film between 1943 and 1997. She made over 60 appearances in film, spanning six decades of Argentine cinema, but is best known for her work during the Golden Age of Argentine cinema. Throughout the course of her career, she received four Silver Condor Awards, two Martín Fierro Awards, a Konex Foundation Award and several others for her films and television performances. She is credited with starring in the first film in Argentina which featured nudity, though only her back was shown and she stated repeatedly that she wore a flesh-colored mesh and was not truly nude.

== Biography ==
Olga Adela Zubiarriaín was born on 30 October 1929 in the Buenos Aires neighborhood of Parque de los Patricios. She attended 3 years at the Liceo Nacional de Señoritas Nº1 José Figueroa Alcorta, but quit school when her acting career began.

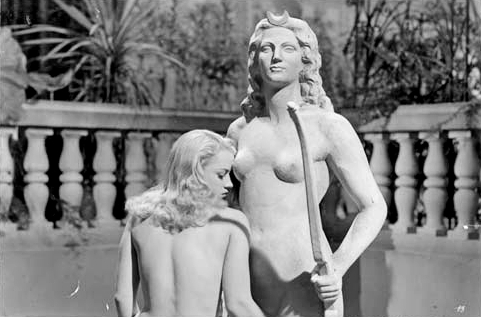
Promotional photo for El ángel desnudo, 1946.

She started as an extra at Lumiton studios in 1943 in the movie Safo, historia de una pasión directed by Carlos Hugo Christensen and starring Mecha Ortiz and Roberto Escalada. In 1944 she starred in La pequeña señora de Pérez with Mirtha Legrand and Juan Carlos Thorry. Her rise to fame occurred with the film adaptation (El ángel desnudo) of the novel Frau Elsie, by Arthur Schnitzler. Often billed as the first nude film in Argentina, in reality, the film showed only her bare back, which she claimed was not nude, but was covered with flesh-colored mesh. Zubarry won the 1946 Silver Condor Award of the Film Critics Association for Best New Actress for "El ángel desnudo".

In 1950, she made Yo quiero una mujer así for Bolívar Films in Venezuela, directed by Juan Carlos Thorry and in 1951, was in El extraño caso del hombre y la bestia, an adaptation of Robert Louis Stevenson's the Strange Case of Dr Jekyll and Mr Hyde, which was directed by Mario Soffici. She starred with Nathan Finch, in the 1953 film El Vampiro Negro directed by Uruguayan Román Viñoly Barreto, which was Viñoly's remake of the classic M by Fritz Lang. Zubarry won the Film Critics Association Silver Condor Award for Best Actress for her performance in "El vampiro negro".

In 1955 she played the main character of the same name in Marianela, under director Julio Porter. It won herthe Film Critics Association Silver Condor Award for Best Actress of 1955. In 1959 she starred in La sangre y la semilla, a historical film set in 1870 during the War of the Triple Alliance and shot in Itauguá and Capiatá, Paraguay. In 1961 she appeared in the role of "Salui" in "Hijo de hombre", one of her personal favorites, which was an adaptation of the novel of the same name by Paraguayan writer Augusto Roa Bastos and directed by Lucas Demare and with Spanish actor Francisco Rabal. She won a "Concha de Oro" (Golden Shell) at the San Sebastian Festival for her work on the film.

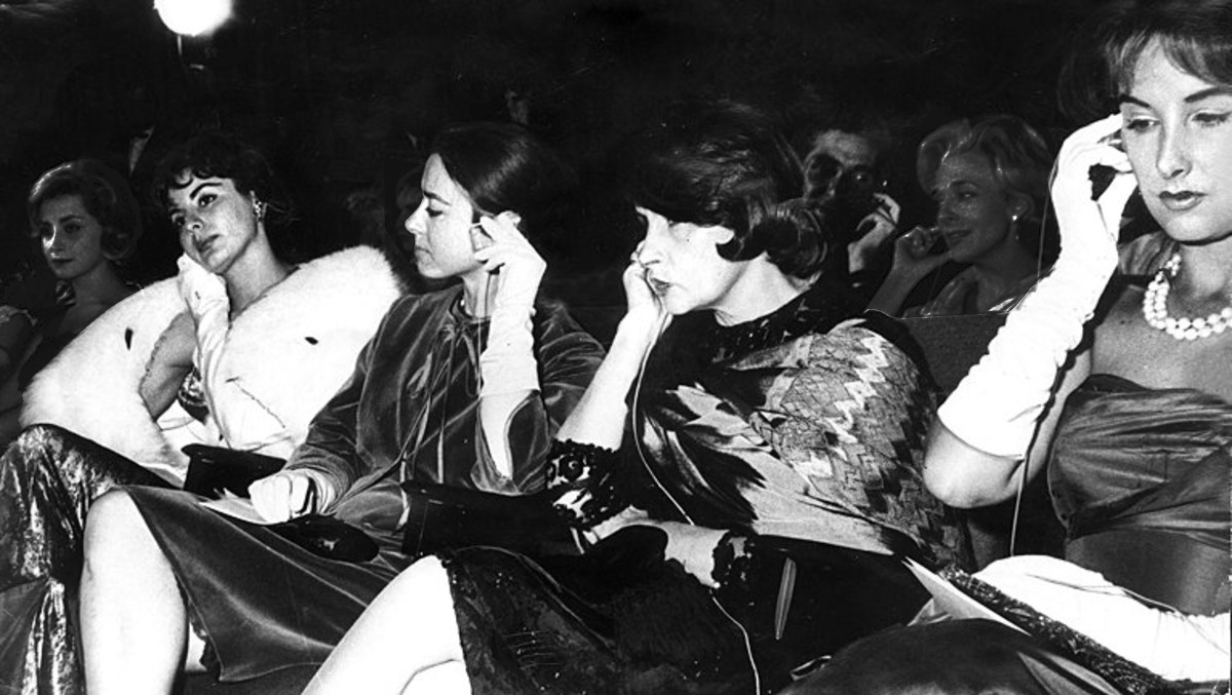
Zubarry at the premier of the Berlin (Germany) Film Festival in 1961. Left to right: unknown woman, Isabel Sarli, Zubarry, Tita Merello, unknown actress in second row and Mirtha Legrand.

Zubarry appeared in A hierro muere in 1962 with Alberto de Mendoza, Invasión by writer Jorge Luis Borges (1969), Crecer de golpe (1976), ¿Somos? (1982) and Plaza de almas (1997). In her career, she made over 60 films.

Beginning in the early 1970s, she started doing television. Her television debut was with the series La comedia de la noche, and she followed that with Alta comedia, Nosotros y los miedos, Situación límite, Atreverse, El precio del poder, El Sillón de Rivadavia and "Fulanas y menganas". She earned two Martín Fierro Awards, one in 1972 for "Alta Comedia" and one in 1988 for "De Fulanas y Menganas". In 1991, Zubarry received a Diploma of Merit from the Konex Foundation for best dramatic actress in radio and television.

In 1997, she won the Silver Condor Award for Best Supporting Actress for "Plaza de almas" and retired. She said, "You have to retire at the right time." The following year, she won the ACE award for Best Actress for the same film.

Beginning in 1983 she served as matron to two MAMA (Mis Alumnos Más Amigos) homes. The organization is an NGO, which provides homes for street children, giving them a pace to live, study and train for employment. She was also a staunch fan of the Club Atlético Huracán (Hurricane Football Club of Buenos Aires).

She died in Buenos Aires on 15 December 2012, aged 83.

== Awards ==
- 1946: Silver Condor Award of the Film Critics Association for Best New Actress for "El ángel desnudo"
- 1953: Silver Condor Award of the Film Critics Association for Best Actress for "El vampiro negro"
- 1955: Silver Condor Award of the Film Critics Association for Best Actress for "Marianela".
- 1961: Spanish American Award "Concha de Oro" (Golden Shell) at the San Sebastian Festival for "Hijo de hombre"
- 1972: Martín Fierro APTRA Award as best actress for "Alta Comedia"
- 1983: Santa Clara de Asis Award for "El sillón de Rivadavia"
- 1988: Martín Fierro Protagonista Award for best female performance for "De Fulanas y Menganas"
- 1991: Konex Diploma of Merit for best dramatic actress in radio and television
- 1994: Podestá Award for Lifetime Achievement.
- 1997: Silver Condor Award of the Film Critics Association for best supporting actress for the film "Plaza de almas"
- 1998: ACE for Best Actress for "Plaza de almas"

== Filmography ==
=== Films ===
- 1943: Safo, historia de una pasión
- 1943: Dieciséis años (uncredited)
- 1944: La pequeña señora de Pérez
- 1945: Las seis suegras de Barba Azul
- 1946: El ángel desnudo
- 1946: No salgas esta noche
- 1946: Adán y la serpiente
- 1948: Los pulpos
- 1948: La muerte camina en la lluvia
- 1949: Yo no elegí mi vida
- 1950: Valentina
- 1950: Abuso de confianza
- 1951: Yo quiero una mujer así
- 1951: El extraño caso del hombre y la bestia
- 1951: La comedia inmortal
- 1951: ¡Qué hermanita!
- 1951: El honorable inquilino
- 1952: El baldito
- 1952: Ellos nos hicieron así
- 1953: Mercado negro
- 1953: El vampiro negro
- 1954: Sucedió en Buenos Aires
- 1954: Maleficio
- 1954: Tres citas con el destino
- 1955: Concierto para una lágrima
- 1955: La simuladora
- 1955: Vida nocturna
- 1955: De noche también se duerme
- 1955: Marianela
- 1956: Pecadora
- 1958: Los dioses ajenos
- 1959: En la vía
- 1959: La sangre y la semilla
- 1959: The Candidate
- 1960: Todo el año es Navidad
- 1960: Las furias
- 1961: Hijo de hombre
- 1962: Misión 52
- 1962: A hierro muere
- 1964: Proceso a la conciencia or Proceso a la ley
- 1965: Los guerrilleros
- 1965: Ahorro y préstamo... para el amor
- 1968: Amor y un poco más
- 1968: Asalto a la ciudad
- 1969: Somos novios
- 1969: Invasión
- 1970: El hombre del año
- 1972: Mi hijo Ceferino Namuncurá
- 1973: Si se calla el cantor
- 1974: La Mary
- 1974: Yo tengo fe
- 1974: El Encanto del amor prohibido or Sobre gustos y colores
- 1975: El inquisidor de Lima or El inquisidor
- 1975: Las procesadas
- 1976: Los chicos crecen
- 1977: La nueva cigarra
- 1977: Crecer de golpe
- 1978: Mi mujer no es mi señora
- 1980: Desde el abismo
- 1982: Los pasajeros del jardín
- 1982: ¿Somos?
- 1984: Los tigres de la memoria
- 1985: Contar hasta diez
- 1985: Luna caliente
- 1986: En busca del brillante perdido
- 1996: Luces de ayer (short)
- 1997: El ángel y el escritor (short)
- 1997: Plaza de almas

=== Television ===
- 1970 approx.: La comedia de la noche (ciclo de televisión), con el actor Raúl Rossi, dirigida por María Herminia Avellaneda, en Canal 13.
- 1971: Narciso Ibáñez Menta presenta: Un hombre extraño (película de televisión, por Canal 9).
- 1971: Alta comedia, episodio "Todos eran mis hijos" (Canal 9).
- 1971: Alta comedia, episodio "Véndame su hijo" (Canal 9).
- 1971: Alta comedia, episodio "De carne somos" (Canal 9).
- 1972: Alta comedia, episodio "La sombra" (Canal 9).
- 1972: Alta comedia, episodio "Como tú me deseas" (Canal 9).
- 1972: Estación Retiro (Canal 9), como Andrea Adalguía
- 1973: Alta comedia, episodio "Panorama desde el puente" (Canal 9), como Beatrice
- 1973: Alta comedia, episodio "Cuando estemos casados" (Canal 9), como María
- 1973: ¡Qué vida de locos! (Canal 9), como Inés
- 1974: Alta comedia, episodio "El mar profundo y azul" (Canal 9).
- 1974: Alta comedia, episodio "Pasión en Mallorca" (Canal 9).
- 1974: Alta comedia, episodio "La casa de los siete balcones" (Canal 9).
- 1974: Alta comedia, episodio "De Bécquer con amor" (Canal 9).
- 1974: Alta comedia, episodio "Cartas de amor" (Canal 9).
- 1974: Alta comedia, episodio "Alfonsina" (Canal 9).
- 1974: Teatro para sonreír (Canal 11).
- 1974: Narciso Ibáñez Serrador presenta a Narciso Ibáñez Menta, episodio "La zarpa" (Canal 11), como Teresa
- 1974: Narciso Ibáñez Serrador presenta a Narciso Ibáñez Menta, episodio "El regreso" (Canal 11), como Teresa
- 1975: Tu rebelde ternura, serie de televisión (Canal 13).
- 1976 o 1979: La posada del sol, serie de televisión (Canal 13).
- 1977: Aventura 77, miniserie de televisión (Canal 13).
- 1978: Nuestro encuentro (Canal 9).
- 1979: El león y la rosa, serie de televisión (Canal 13), como Clara
- 1979: Propiedad horizontal, serie de televisión (Canal 9), como Mónica Dalton.
- 1980: Hombres en pugna, película de televisión.
- 1981: Los especiales de ATC (Hombres en pugna" (ATC).
- 1981: Laura mía (ATC), como Caridad.
- 1982: Nosotros y los miedos, serie de televisión, episodio "Miedo a los jóvenes" (Canal 9), como Antonia.
- 1982: Nosotros y los miedos, episodio "Miedo a recomenzar" (Canal 9), como Virginia.
- 1982: Nosotros y los miedos, episodio "Miedo a la traición" (Canal 9), como Haydée.
- 1982: Nosotros y los miedos, episodio "Miedo a asumir las responsabilidades" (Canal 9), como farmacéutica.
- 1982: Nosotros y los miedos, episodio "Miedo a la violencia" (Canal 9), como Teresa.
- 1982: Nosotros y los miedos, episodio "Miedo a la desilusión " (Canal 9), como Berta.
- 1982: Nosotros y los miedos, episodio "Miedo a las culpas" (Canal 9), como Graciela.
- 1982: Nosotros y los miedos, episodio "Miedo al abandono" (Canal 9), como Raquel.
- 1982: Nosotros y los miedos, episodio "Miedo a equivocarse" (Canal 9), como Isabel.
- 1982: Nosotros y los miedos, episodio "Miedo a la injusticia" (Canal 9), como Margarita.
- 1982: Nosotros y los miedos, episodio "Miedo a compartir" (Canal 9), como Elia.
- 1982: Nosotros y los miedos, episodio "Miedo al régimen" (Canal 9), como Isabel.
- 1982: Nosotros y los miedos, episodio "Miedo a afrontar" (Canal 9). como Elena.
- 1982: Nosotros y los miedos, episodio "Miedo a los demás" (Canal 9), como Lidia.
- 1982: Nosotros y los miedos, episodio "Miedo al análisis" (Canal 9), como Berta.
- 1982: Nosotros y los miedos, episodio "Miedo a la infidelidad" (Canal 9), como Inés.
- 1982: Nosotros y los miedos, episodio "Miedo al mundo" (Canal 9), como Irene.
- 1982: Nosotros y los miedos, episodio "Miedo a cumplir con el deber" (Canal 9), como madre de Fernando.
- 1982: Nosotros y los miedos, episodio "Miedo a dar" (Canal 9), como Rosario.
- 1982: Nosotros y los miedos, episodio "Miedo a decidir" (Canal 9), como Aída.
- 1982: Nosotros y los miedos, episodio "Miedo a la paz" (Canal 9), como Inés.
- 1982: Nosotros y los miedos, episodio "Miedo a ver" (Canal 9), como Esther.
- 1982: Nosotros y los miedos, episodio "Miedo a reintegrarse" (Canal 9), como Aída.
- 1982: Nosotros y los miedos, episodio "Miedo al cáncer" (Canal 9), como Sonia.
- 1983: Nosotros y los miedos, episodio "Miedo a la vejez" (Canal 9), como Amanda.
- 1983: Nosotros y los miedos, episodio "Miedo a la mediocridad" (Canal 9), como María.
- 1983: Nosotros y los miedos, episodio "Miedo a la realidad" (Canal 9), como Nieves.
- 1983: Nosotros y los miedos, episodio "Miedo a denunciar" (Canal 9), como Irene.
- 1983: El sillón de Rivadavia (ganadora del Premio Santa Clara de Asís en 1983).
- 1985: El puente de coral vivo (Canal 13).
- 1985: La única noche, serie de televisión (ATC).
- 1986: Navidad: variaciones sobre un mismo tema (ATC).
- 1986: Situación límite, episodio "Exámenes" (ATC).
- 1986: Soñar sin límite (ATC).
- 1987–1989: De fulanas y menganas (ATC).
- 1990–1991: Atreverse, serie de televisión (Telefé).
- 1991: Socorro, sobrinos (ATC).
- 1992: Amores
- 1992: El precio del poder (Canal 9).
