= 1945 Argentine Film Critics Association Awards =

Argentine film awards ceremony in 1945

The 1945 Argentine Film Critics Association Awards ceremony was held in Buenos Aires on 4 January 1945 to honour the best films and contributors to Argentine cinema in 1944.

== Awards given ==
- Best Film (Mejor Película): Su mejor alumno
- Best Director (Mejor Director): Lucas Demare for Su mejor alumno
- Best Actor (Mejor Actor): Enrique Muiño for Su mejor alumno
- Best Actress (Mejor Actriz): Mirtha Legrand for La pequeña señora de Pérez
- Best Actor in a Comic Role (Mejor Actor Cómico): Pepe Iglesias for Mi novia es un fantasma
- Best Supporting Actor (Mejor Actor de Reparto): Sebastián Chiola for The Corpse Breaks a Date (El muerto falta a la cita)
- Best Supporting Actress (Mejor Actriz de Reparto): Elsa O'Connor for El deseo
- Best Original Screenplay (Mejor Guión Original): Roberto Talice, Eliseo Montaine for Centauros del pasado
- Best Adapted Screenplay (Mejor Guión Adaptado): Ulises Petit de Murat, Homero Manzi for Su mejor alumno
- Best Cinematography (Mejor Fotografía): Adolfo W. Slazy for Pachamama
- Best Sound (Mejor Sonido): Mario Fezia for 24 horas en la vida de una mujer
- Best Music (Mejor Music): Alejandro Gutiérrez del Barrio for Pachamama
- Best Camera Operator (Mejor Càmara): Humberto Peruzzi for Su mejor alumno
- Best Foreign Film (Mejor Película Extranjera): Leo McCarey's Going My Way (1944)
