= Adolfo Mazzone =

Argentine comics artist and humorist

Adolfo Mazzone

Adolfo Mazzone (6 June 1914 – 19 February 2001) was a prolific Argentine comics artist and humorist. His characters included the convict Piantadino, who became the subject of a 1950 film, and Mi Sobrino Capicúa (My Nephew Palindrome), whose adventures were published for almost forty years.

== Career ==
Mazzone was born on 6 June 1914 in the neighbourhood of Balvanera and died on 19 February 2001. He created the classic characters of Piantadino, Capicúa, Afanancio, Batilio, Perkins and Macoco, among others. Mazzone, who held many jobs before succeeding as a cartoonist, was known for his simplicity, charm and grace. He was an unassuming person and avoided publicity.

Mazzone was not only a prolific artist and creator of characters, but founded his own publishing house, which housed dozens of artists for many years and in various publications, including Norberto Vecchio, Walter Casadei, Jose Miguel Heredia, Victor Braxator, and Felix Sabol.

== Work ==
Mazzone's best-known character, Piantadino, first appeared in El Mundo in 1941, and was also published in the magazine Rico Tipo. The comic strip was published during the 1940s and 1950s. Piantadino is a convicted robber skilled in escaping from jail - as long as there were no pies to be eaten. The comic strip was the subject of a 1950 Emelco-American comedy film in which the elusive convict was played by Pepe Iglesias, known for his title role in El Zorro pierde el pelo. The film was directed by Francisco Múgica and also stars Norma Giménez and Juan José Porta.

Mazzone's comic strip Mi Sobrino Capicúa (My Nephew Palindrome) appeared in Patoruzú magazine beginning in 1939. Palindrome lasted into the 1970s.

The strip deals with the adventures of a not-too-bright boy who has bulletproof good luck. The good-natured Palindrome, a voracious devourer of Gruyere cheese, is accompanied by his uncle and by Professor Olegario Bambufoca. Both try to take advantage of the boy, but without success.
