= El Politigato =

Venezuelan YouTuber

GamerKevMo
- Born: Kevin Monsalve

YouTube information
- Channel: MasKevMo
- Years active: 2018–present
- Genres: Comedy; politics
- Subscribers: 607 thousand
- Views: 168 million
- Last updated: 4 August 2026

Kevin Monsalve, also known by his pseudonym GamerKevMo, is a Venezuelan YouTuber and creator of the El Politigato (lit. 'The Politicat') animated shorts series. He is a cartoonist and has also been a professor at the National Film School (Escuela Nacional de Cine) of Caracas.

== Career ==
Kevin Monsalve is a cartoonist and has been a professor of editing at the National Film School (Escuela Nacional de Cine) of Caracas.

On 5 March 2018 Monsalve started a series of animated shorts on his Instagram account called "El Politigato" (lit. 'The Politicat'), which went viral. The cartoon delivers social criticism and analysis of the Venezuelan situation with black humor and satire, starring a witty cat arguing with his Chavista owner; the first chapter was dedicated to the Petro token (PTR) launched by Nicolás Maduro. Monsalve said he takes his ideas from Twitter, and the moods of Politigato reflect those of his cat, Hercules; he believes the comedian's role is to offer reflective solutions to the facts they attack.

Monsalve originally did not expect the project to be successful, but the simple animation allowed him to continue with the production and he began to practice scripts.

By 2023 the series had reached over 90 episodes, published on platforms such as YouTube and Facebook, and has included other characters, including the "MUD Dog" (allusive to the political opposition and its Democratic Unity Roundtable coalition), the "Demented Oppositionist" and "Martin" (a rat with a degree in sociology).

== Appearances ==
Monsalve was the speaker for the Future Present Foundation's presentation on the role of humor in Venezuelan society in September 2019, and in December of that year, he participated as a speaker in the colloquium "The new generation of visual storytellers" at the Cocuyo Festival, held at the Metropolitan University of Caracas and supported by the DW Akademie. He appeared on NOES FM radio in 2018 to discuss the Venezuelan reality with respect to human rights. He was interviewed by César Miguel Rondón about technology, and was a panelist at the National Film School in a discussion of the importance of sound in film.
