= Six Months of Life =

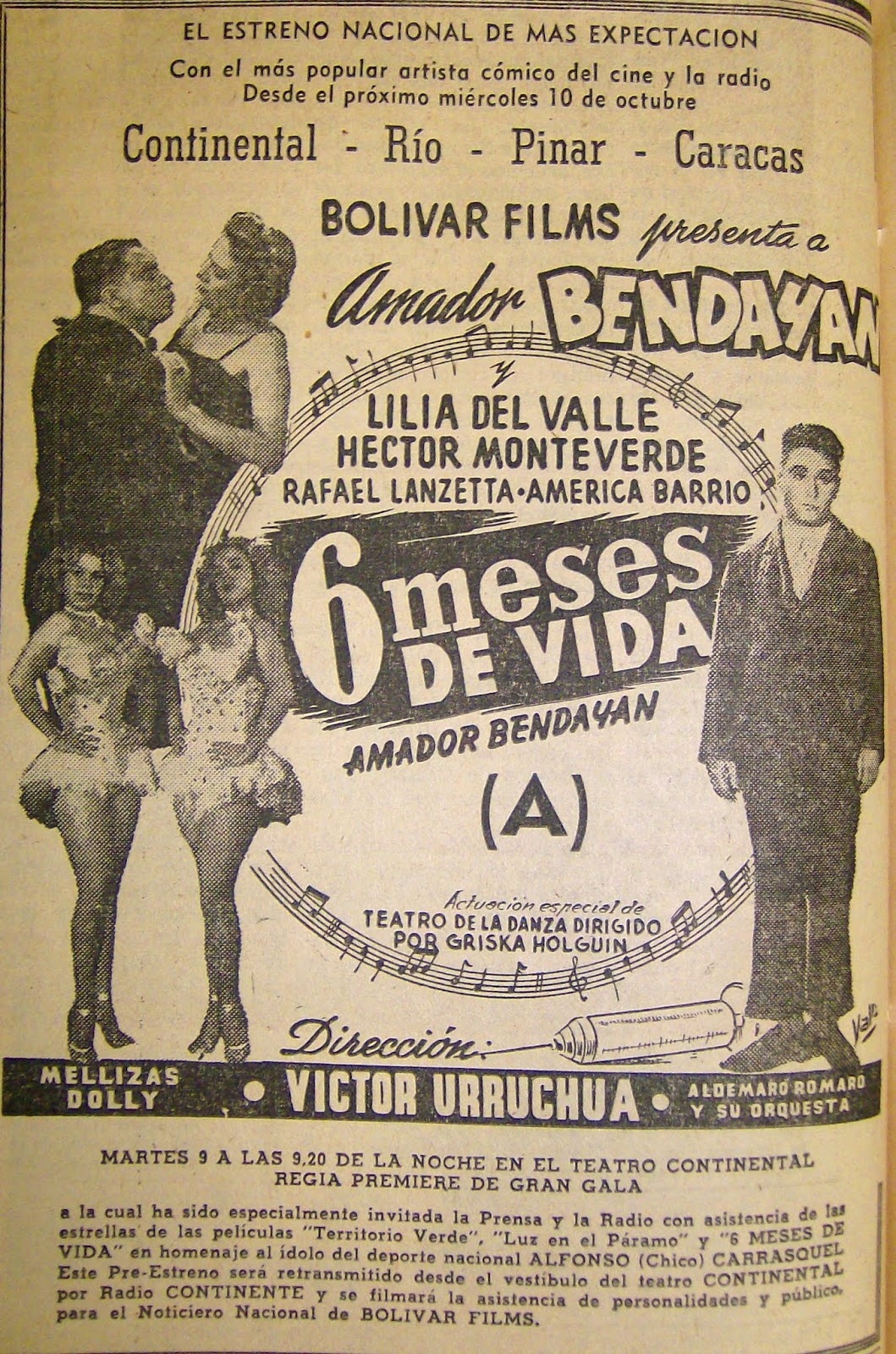
- Directed by: Víctor Urruchúa
- Written by: Francisco Baus; Víctor Urruchúa
- Produced by: Luis Guillermo Villegas Blanco
- Cinematography: Adam Jacko
- Edited by: Juana de Jacko
- Music by: Aldemaro Romero; Eduardo Serrano
- Production companies: Bolívar Film; Peliculas Venezolanas
- Distributed by: Bolívar Film
- Release date: 1951
- Running time: 109 minutes
- Country: Venezuela
- Language: Spanish

Six Months of Life (Spanish:Seis meses de vida) is a 1951 Venezuelan drama film directed by Víctor Urruchúa.

== Cast ==
- Hermelinda Alvarado
- Amador Bendayan
- Francisco Bernalche
- Aldo Bogni
- América Bravo
- Pedro Contreras
- Camelia Coronado
- Herminia de Martucci
- Lilia del Valle
- Mireya Delgado
- Ildemaro Garcia
- Max Gil
- Helvia Hazz de Zapata
- Norberto Juz
- José Labarrera
- Rafael Lanzetta
- Carlos Latorre
- Edda Margolis
- Carmen Mendoza
- Héctor Monteverde
- Juan Olaguivel
- Saúl Peraza
- Jorge Reyes
- Pedro M. Risson
- Francisco Rodríguez
- Aldemaro Romero
- José Luis Sarzalejo
- Carmen Seyer
- Marco Strodi
- Víctor Urruchúa
- Pura Vargas
- Ramón Zavalsa

== Bibliography ==
- Darlene J. Sadlier. Latin American Melodrama: Passion, Pathos, and Entertainment. University of Illinois Press, 2009.
