= 24 Hours in the Life of a Woman (1968 film) =

1968 film

- Film poster
- Directed by: Dominique Delouche
- Screenplay by: Dominique Delouche; Paul Hengge; Eberhard Keindorff; Marie-France Rivière; Johanna Sibelius; Albert Valentin
- Based on: Twenty-Four Hours in the Life of a Woman by Stefan Zweig
- Produced by: Louis-Emile Galey
- Starring: Danielle Darrieux; Robert Hoffmann
- Cinematography: Walter Wottitz
- Edited by: Edith Schuman; Geneviève Winding
- Music by: Jean Prodromidès
- Production companies: Progéfi; Roxy Film, Pathé Consortium Cinéma
- Distributed by: Pathé Consortium Cinéma
- Release dates: June 1968 (Austria); 25 December 1968 (France)
- Running time: 84 minutes
- Countries: France; West Germany
- Language: French

24 Hours in the Life of a Woman (French: Vingt-Quatre Heures de la vie d'une femme) is a 1968 French-West German drama film directed by Dominique Delouche, based on the novella Twenty-Four Hours in the Life of a Woman by the Austrian author Stefan Zweig. It was listed to compete at the 1968 Cannes Film Festival, but the festival was cancelled due to the events of May 1968 in France. The book on which the film is based had previously been adapted as 24 Hours of a Woman's Life in 1952, and was later adapted as 24 Hours in the Life of a Woman in 2002.

== Plot ==
In Monte Carlo, the 42-year-old widow Alice observes a young man with a frightening passion for gambling, who completely ruins himself in the casino. She saves Thomas from suicide and spends a night in a hotel with him in a frenzy of helpful pity. In the morning, Alice reacts with shame and horror. Anxious to bring the matter to a good conclusion, she meets again during the day with the young man, who now, with overflowing gratitude, venerates her like a maternal saint. In German, Thomas quotes the first stanza of the poem "Du meine Seele, du mein Herz" ("You, my soul. You, my heart") by Friedrich Rückert. And that is what hurts this woman and awakens in her more than motherly love. She secretly prepares to leave on the same train with Thomas and to stay with him. When she finally reaches the station, the train has already left. And her disappointment at having lost him as a man is joined by an even more bitter one: when she enters the casino again, looking for memories, her protégé, who had fervently renounced gambling even in a church, is playing with the money advanced by Alice for his trip home. Worse still, he gives it back to her in a wild riot of a temporary win and deeply humiliates her in front of all the casino guests.

== Cast ==
- Danielle Darrieux as Alice
- Robert Hoffmann as Thomas
- Romina Power as Mariette
- Léna Skerla as Mademoiselle Georges
- Marthe Alycia as Madame Di Stefano
- Even de Tissot as Le pianiste
- Helga Eilendrop
