= Eduardo Serrano =

Eduardo Serrano may refer to:

- Eduardo Serrano (musician) (1911–2008), Venezuelan musician, conductor and composer
- Eduardo Serrano (actor) (1942–2025), Venezuelan actor
