= Juana Sujo =

Argentine stage and film actress

- Born: 14 July 1913; Buenos Aires, Argentina
- Died: 12 July 1961; Caracas, Venezuela
- Other name: Juana Sujovolsky
- Occupation: Actress
- Years active: 1939-1950 (film)

Juana Sujo (1913–1961) was an Argentine stage and film actress. Sujo was a noted stage actress, and in 1939 appeared in her first film. In 1948 she left Argentina due to her opposition to the regime of Juan Perón and settled in Venezuela where she lived until her death.

== Biography ==
She was born as Juana Sujovolsky to an Argentine Jewish family in Buenos Aires and spent some of childhood in Brazil and Germany. She was educated alongside her sisters Berta and Ana in Berlin where they were currently living in 1923. She studied with the renowned Max Reinhardt and Ilka Grüning, and was the companion and friend of actress Lilli Palmer. During her studies, she met Stefan Schnabel and Franz Schnyder in Berlin where she played her first role in a film, The Cold Heart by Karl Ulrich Schnabel. She was contracted to work with Otto Falckenberg in the Munich Kammerspiele.

She was forced to flee to England after the rise of Nazism and returned to Argentina where she debuted in Enrique Susini's theater company with Lola Membrives. In 1948 she began traveling through Ecuador, Chile, and Peru, where she found acting work. In April 1949 Sujo moved to Venezuela to star in the Bolívar Films movie El demonio es un ángel. In 1950 she founded the Estudio Dramático Juana Sujo at the Museo de Bellas Artes, which she converted into the Escuela Nacional de Arte Escénico in 1952. She founded the Sociedad Venezolana de Teatro in 1955.

An opponent of the repressive regime of Venezuelan President Marcos Pérez Jiménez, she was credited with sparking the popular uprising that led to his removal from power. Aaron Copland had come to Caracas to conduct the first Venezuelan performance of his Lincoln Portrait on March 27, 1957. A New York Times reviewer said it had a "magical effect" on the audience. As Copland recalled, "To everyone's surprise, the reigning dictator, who had rarely dared to be seen in public, arrived at the last possible moment." On that evening Juana Sujo was the narrator who performed the spoken-word parts of the piece. When she spoke the final words, "...that government of the people, by the people, for the people (el gobierno del pueblo, por el pueblo y para el pueblo) shall not perish from the earth," the audience rose and began cheering and shouting so loudly that Copland could not hear the remainder of the music. Copland continued, "It was not long after that the dictator was deposed and fled from the country. I was later told by an American foreign service officer that the Lincoln Portrait was credited with having inspired the first public demonstration against him. That, in effect, it had started a revolution."

== Selected filmography ==
- The Cold Heart (1932, finished in 2016)
- The Life of Carlos Gardel (1939)
- Flecha de oro (1940)
- Dama de compañía (1940)
- La hora de las sorpresas (1941)
- Último refugio (1941)
- Eclipse of the Sun (1943)
- Cuando florezca el naranjo (1943)
- Our Natacha (1944)
- Lost Kisses (1945)
- Como tú lo soñaste (1947)
- The Demon is an Angel (1949)
- The Trap (1949)
- The Yacht Isabel Arrived This Afternoon (1950)

== Bibliography ==
- Finkielman, Jorge. The Film Industry in Argentina: An Illustrated Cultural History. McFarland, 2003.
- Marquez, Carlos. Juana Sujo: impulsora del teatro contemporáneo venezolano. Fondo Editorial FUNDARTE, Alcaldia de Caracas, 01.01.1996
- Dembo, Miriam. Juana Sujo: (1913 1961). Editora El Nacional : Fundación Bancaribe, [2009]
