= The Yacht Isabel Arrived This Afternoon =

- Directed by: Carlos Hugo Christensen
- Written by: Carlos Hugo Christensen; Guillermo Meneses; Aquiles Nazoa
- Produced by: Carlos Hugo Christensen; Enrique Faustin; Luis Guillermo Villegas Blanco
- Starring: Arturo de Córdova
- Cinematography: José María Beltrán
- Edited by: Nello Melli
- Music by: Eduardo Serrano
- Production company: Bolívar Films
- Release date: April 1949
- Running time: 96 minutes
- Countries: Argentina; Venezuela
- Language: Spanish

The Yacht Isabel Arrived This Afternoon (Spanish: La Balandra Isabel llegó esta tarde) is a 1949 Venezuelan-Argentine film directed by Carlos Hugo Christensen during the classical era of Argentine cinema. It was shown at the 1951 Cannes Film Festival, where it also won for Best Cinematography.

The film was part of an ultimately failed effort by the producer Luis Guillermo Villegas Blanco to establish a Venezuelan film industry during the era. Despite this, it is seen as marking the "true birth of Venezuelan cinema".

For the film, Blanco brought in established film personnel and actors from Argentina and Mexico. It was shot on location and at the Bolivar Studios in Caracas.

== Synopsis ==
The captain of a small vessel regularly sailing between his home island of Margarita Island in the Caribbean and the Venezuelan mainland has two separate and very different relationships. At home he is happily married, having named his boat Isabel after his wife. He also has a young son Juan who aspires to become his father's cabin boy. Yet on his visits to the port of La Guaira he has a passionate affair with Esperanza, a woman working in a seedy cabaret.

Having decided to give up his mistress, even considering selling his boat so that he can no longer visit her, she arranges to have a voodoo spell placed on him which sends him into an obsessive trance. Only through the intervention of his son, and a violent confrontation, is he finally able to break free from her control.

== Cast ==
- Arturo de Córdova as Segundo Mendoza
- Virginia Luque as Esperanza
- América Barrios as Maria
- Juana Sujo as Isabel Mendoza
- Tomás Henríquez as Bocú
- Juan Corona
- Luis Galíndez
- Máximo Giráldez
- Pura Vargas
- María Gámez
- Blanca Pereira
- José Luis Sarzalejo
- Paul Antillano
- Carlos Flores
- Néstor Zavarce as Juan Mendoza

== Production ==
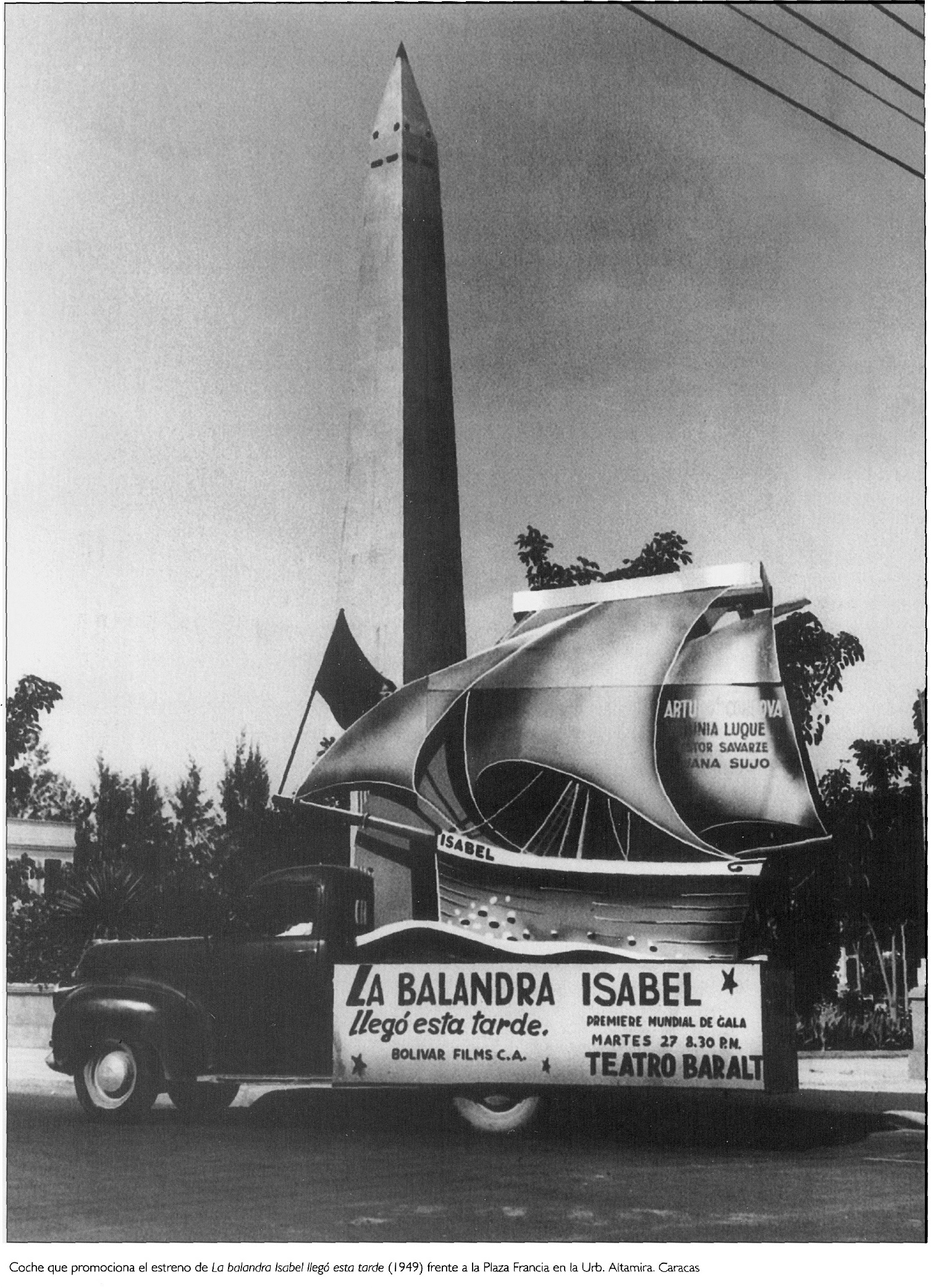
A photograph of a model yacht advertising the film, parked in Plaza Francia, Caracas

The film was produced by Bolívar Films through Luis Guillermo Villegas Blanco. The associate producers were Enrique Faustin and Christensen. Christensen was also chosen by the Venezuelan production to be director; Aguilar and Ortiz suggest that he was chosen to direct in large part because of his "audacity [...] when he introduced eroticism in the Argentine melodrama, especially in Safo, historia de una pasión". Román Chalbaud was the second assistant director.

Filming locations include Caracas, Margarita, Costa de Barlovento, and Muchinga de la Guaira. The neighborhood of Muchinga had been abandoned shortly before the film was made, seen as a place of destitution, but was in part rebuilt for the film, with El Nacional reporting at the time that dozens of tradesmen were deployed to the coast. Actor Arturo de Córdova both visited this area and moved to Margarita, living among the fishermen for several months to get into character.

The music used in the film, under direction and composition of the Venezuelan Eduardo Serrano, reflects the traditional music of the locations in the film and incorporates Afro-Venezuelan music. Serrano had minimal experience with music for film. Within the music department was Leopoldo Orzali, who had worked with Christensen on films before.

The story of the film is based on the novel of the same name written by Guillermo Meneses, and is described as a political narrative that intends to break traditional regionalism.

== Bibliography ==
- Aguilar, Emiliano; Ortiz, Milagros (2012). Manetti, Ricardo; Piedras, Pablo (eds.). "La Balandra Isabel llegó esta tarde: Crónicas de un viaje: del éxito al olvido" (PDF). Historia del Cine Latinoamericano y Argentino. Universidad de Buenos Aires.
- Rist, Peter H. (2014). Historical Dictionary of South American Cinema. Rowman & Littlefield. ISBN 9780810880368.
- González Peña, Efraín (2000). "'La balandra Isabel llegó esta tarde', problemas de recepción de un discurso literario con función de revaloración estética". Letras. 61. Instituto Pedagógico de Caracas: 133–150. ISSN 0459-1283.
