= List of Argentine films of 1944 =

A list of films produced in Argentina in 1944:

Argentine films of 1944
Title	Director	Release	Genre
A - J
Apasionadamente	Luis César Amadori	19 May	
La Casta Susana	Benito Perojo	11 October	
Centauros del pasado	Belisario García Villar	13 September	
The Corpse Breaks a Date	Pierre Chenal	7 December	Thriller
Cuando la primavera se equivoca	Mario Soffici	31 October	
La Danza De La Fortuna	Luis Bayón Herrera	3 April	comedy
Delirio	Arturo García Buhr	17 March	Drama
El deseo	Carlos Schlieper	27 September	comedy
Los dos rivales	Luis Bayón Herrera	4 February	Drama
El fin de la noche	Alberto de Zavalía	1 November	Drama; Bélica
Hay que casar a Paulina	Manuel Romero	31 March	comedy
La importancia de ser ladrón	Julio Saraceni	28 July	comedy
El juego del amor y del azar	Leopoldo Torres Ríos	23 June	comedy
K - Z
Mi novia es un fantasma	Francisco Mugica	2 June	comedy
Nuestra Natacha	Julio Saraceni	7 September	Drama
Pachamama	Roberto de Ribón	26 May	
La pequeña señora de Pérez	Carlos Hugo Christensen	8 January	comedy
Se rematan ilusiones	Mario C. Lugones	28 April	
Siete mujeres	Benito Perojo	30 March	Drama
Su esposa diurna	Enrique Cahen Salaberry	12 May	comedy
Su mejor alumno	Lucas Demare	22 May	drama histórico
Un muchacho de Buenos Aires	Julio Irigoyen	3 April	Musical
Veinticuatro horas en la vida de una mujer	Carlos Borcosque	17 August	Drama
La verdadera victoria	Carlos Borcosque	7 March	

== Images ==
Apasionadamente

== External links and references ==
- Argentine films of 1944 at the Internet Movie Database
