= Bolívar Films =

Venezuelan film production company

Bolivar Films
- Founder: Luis Guillermo Villegas Blanco
- Location: Caracas
- Region served: Latin America

Bolívar Films is a Venezuelan film production company headquartered in Caracas, which works on films, advertisements, post-production, and television. The Cine Archivo Bolívar Films is also one of the most important film archives in Venezuela.

== History ==
Short productions by Bolívar Films

Bolívar Films began in 1939, with documentaries made by Luis Guillermo Villegas Blanco and Samuel Dembo. The first known productions were a series of documentaries under the title Estampas regionales. The company was consolidated in 1942, absorbing the companies Estudios Ávila and Cóndor Films, and setting up in the El Conde area of Caracas. It became registered on 14 October 1943.

As well as government funding, Bolívar Films benefited from the first advertising boom in Venezuela, signing a contract with ARS Publicidad in 1944 to produce advertising shorts for cinema release.

By 1946, the production company had its own building in eastern Caracas, was expanding and renovating its equipment to undertake the production of feature films, and could provide technical services to other producers. In addition, it produced the country's first weekly newscast with government commissions and advertising reporting. Between 1946 and 1947, Villegas Blanco planned to shoot fictional feature films for commercial theaters, inspired by the model of Argentine and Mexican cinema. He hired technical and artistic personnel in these countries, trained Venezuelan personnel, bought new equipment, built a filming studio, and sought out - albeit with little success - national and Latin American distribution and exhibition contracts. The result of this was a variety of films, of varying prestige and quality, made by foreign directors: The Demon is an Angel (1949, Carlos Hugo Christensen), The Yacht Isabel Arrived This Afternoon (1950, Christensen), That's the Woman I Want (1950, Juan Carlos Thorry), Dawn of Life (1950, Fernando Cortés), Venezuela también canta (1951, Cortés), Six Months of Life (1951, Víctor Urruchúa), Green Territory (1952, Ariel Severino and Horacio Peterson), and Light in the High Plains (1953, Urruchúa). Distribution and exhibition problems made these films commercial failures, with the company continuing to run by producing documentaries, advertisements, and newscasts.

The films were more critically successful, with The Yacht Isabel... winning the Best Cinematography award at the 1951 Cannes Film Festival.

== Film Archive ==
The Cine Archivo Bolívar Films, holds six million feet of film in 35 mm format and over 20,000 film reels, and offers film transfer in various video formats (Betacam, MiniDV, XDCAM, and DVD).
