= Cine Mestizo =

Venezuelan streaming service platform

- Available in: Spanish
- Area served: Worldwide
- Industry: Technology, entertainment industry
- Products: Streaming media; Video on demand
- Services: Film distribution
- Website: cinemestizo.com

Cine Mestizo was a subscription streaming service focused on Venezuelan films. As of 2024 the sitw is no longer available

== History ==
The film Once Upon a Time in Venezuela was available on the platform during its nomination for the Academy Awards. Cine Mestizo was among the platforms that offered the film catalog of the second edition of the Miradas Diversas International Human Rights Film Festival, which took place between 25 November and 19 December 2020.

In 2021, it initiated the film heritage recovery program "Visual Thinking: Beyond Competition" in conjunction with the Foundation for the Development of Arts and Culture (Fundearc) to contribute to the formation of audiovisual education centers in Venezuela. Between April 7 and 14, 2021 presented the VI Annual Exhibition of Short Films of the Escuela Nacional de Cine (ENC).

Cine Mestizo has offered online options to watch screenings of the Venezuelan Film Festival in the state of Merida in 2021 and 2022.
