= Como yo no hay dos =

1952 film

- Directed by: Kurt Land
- Written by: Ariel Cortazzo
- Produced by: Raimundo Horvilleur
- Starring: Pepe Iglesias; Pepita Muñoz; Olga Gatti; Margarita Padín; Marcos Caplán
- Edited by: José Cardella
- Release date: 1952
- Running time: 77 min.
- Country: Argentina
- Language: Spanish

Como yo no hay dos is a 1952 film of the classical era of Argentine cinema written by Ariel Cortazzo and directed by Kurt Land. The film stars Pepe Iglesias, Pepita Muñoz, Olga Gatti, Margarita Padín, and Marcos Caplán.

== Synopsis ==
The film revolves around a dishonest person living in a boarding house who ends up becoming a radio star.

== Cast ==
- Pepe Iglesias as Pepe Céspedes
- Pepita Muñoz as Doña Cirila
- Olga Gatti as Rosita
- Margarita Padín as Josefa
- Juan José Porta as Morales
- Toti Muñoz as Florinda
- Iván Casado as himself
