= Neither Blood nor Sand =

1941 film

- Directed by: Alejandro Galindo
- Written by: Alfredo B. Crevenna; Alejandro Galindo; Alfredo Robledo; Jaime Salvador
- Produced by: Francisco Cabrera; Jacques Gelman; Santiago Reachi
- Starring: Mario Moreno «Cantinflas» Susana Guízar; Elvia Salcedo
- Cinematography: Gabriel Figueroa
- Edited by: Charles L. Kimball
- Music by: Elías Breeskin; Fernando V. Silva
- Production company: Posa Films
- Release date: 22 May 1941 (Mexico)
- Running time: 104 minutes
- Country: Mexico
- Language: Spanish

Neither Blood nor Sand (Spanish: Ni sangre, ni arena) is a 1941 Mexican comedy film directed by Alejandro Galindo and starring Mario Moreno «Cantinflas», Susana Guízar and Elvia Salcedo. It was intended as a parody of the big-budget Hollywood film Blood and Sand, which portrays the world of bullfighting. It was shot at the Clasa Studios in Mexico City. The film's sets were designed by the art director Jorge Fernandez.

It was Cantinflas' second full feature film, and its popularity cemented his rising success. He did not get on well with the film's director, but bonded with his assistant Miguel M. Delgado who became his favourite director and directed many of his films. Cantinflas rapidly followed the film with another success, The Unknown Policeman.

== Cast ==
- Mario Moreno «Cantinflas» as El Chato / Manuel Márquez "Manolete"
- Susana Guízar as Anita
- Elvia Salcedo as Lupita
- Pedro Armendáriz as Frank
- Alfredo del Diestro as Don Ramón
- Fernando Soto "Mantequilla" as Charifas
- Miguel Inclán as Jefe de Policía
- Paz Villegas as Doña Remedios
- Salvador Quiroz as Don Pancho
- Arturo Soto Rangel as Juez
- Armando Velasco

== Bibliography ==
- Mora, Carl J. Mexican Cinema: Reflections of a Society, 1896–2004. McFarland & Co, 2005.
