= Mi novia es un fantasma =

- Theatrical release poster
- Directed by: Francisco Múgica
- Screenplay by: Sixto Pondal Ríos
- Cinematography: Alfredo Traverso
- Edited by: Alfredo Rampoldi
- Music by: Bert Rosé
- Production company: Lumiton
- Release date: June 2, 1944 (Buenos Aires)
- Running time: 75 minutes
- Country: Argentina
- Language: Spanish

Mi novia es un fantasma is a 1944 Argentine romantic comedy film of the classical era of Argentine cinema, directed by Francisco Múgica and starring Mirtha Legrand, Pepe Iglesias, and Nuri Montsé. At the 1945 Argentine Film Critics Association Awards Iglesias won the Silver Condor Award for Best Actor in a Comic Role for his performance in the film.

== Cast ==
- Pepe Iglesias
- Mirtha Legrand
- Nuri Montsé
- Osvaldo Miranda
- Benita Puértolas
- Olga Casares Pearson
- Lalo Malcolm
- Susana Campos
- Vicente Rubino
- Mario Giusti
