= Kill and Be Killed =

A hierro muere
- Directed by: Manuel Mur Oti
- Produced by: Manuel Mur Oti
- Starring: Olga Zubarry, Alberto de Mendoza and Luis Prendes
- Cinematography: Manuel Berenguer
- Edited by: Juan Serra
- Music by: Miguel Asins Arbó and Isidro B. Maiztegui
- Distributed by: Filmayer
- Release date: 1962
- Running time: 99 minutes
- Countries: Spain and Argentina
- Language: Spanish

Kill and Be Killed (Spanish: A hierro muere) is a 1962 Spanish-Argentine crime film directed by Manuel Mur Oti and written by Enrique Llovet. Starring Olga Zubarry, and Alberto de Mendoza.

== Plot ==
A former opera singer lives alone with her fortune and a housekeeper. Her daughter Elisa leaves prison and becomes a personal attendant and auxiliary nurse to the aging singer, a profession she has learnt in prison for the sake of reintegration. The old lady's only relative is her nephew Fernando. He comes to the big house every evening and plays the piano to her aunt's joy, and Elisa's too, who feels attracted to him. Fernando receives a monthly allowance, but it is not enough to pay his debts. Her aunt refuses to give him more, and Fernando approaches Elisa, and together they plan to poison her.

== Release and acclaim ==
The film was produced by Argentina Sono Film in 1962.

== Cast ==
Fernando (Alberto de Mendoza) and Elisa (Olga Zubarry)

- Olga Zubarry as Elisa
- Alberto de Mendoza as Fernando
- Luis Prendes
- Katia Loritz
- José Nieto
- Eugenia Zúffoli as Fernando's aunt
- José Bódalo
- Manuel Dicenta
- Luis Peña

== Other cast ==
- Félix Dafauce
- Ana María Noé
- Porfiria Sanchíz
- Jesús Tordesillas
- Jorge Vico
