= The Black Vampire =

- Directed by: Román Viñoly Barreto
- Written by: Alberto Etchebehere, Román Viñoly Barreto
- Starring: Olga Zubarry; Roberto Escalada; Nelly Panizza
- Cinematography: Aníbal González Paz
- Edited by: Jorge Gárate, Higinio Vecchione
- Music by: Juan Ehlert
- Release date: 1953
- Running time: 80 minutes
- Country: Argentina
- Language: Spanish

The Black Vampire (Spanish: El vampiro negro) is a 1953 Argentine film noir of the classical era directed by Román Viñoly Barreto, starring Olga Zubarry and Roberto Escalada. It is inspired by Fritz Lang's M.

== Plot ==
Amalia, a glamorous nightclub singer, witnesses, through a small barred window in her basement dressing room, the figure of a man dumping a small body into a storm drain in the alley behind the nightclub. The man, nicknamed the vampire serial killer by police, has been murdering little girls and disposing of their bodies without leaving a trace of his own identity. Government Prosecutor Dr. Bernard questions Amalia and she falsely denies having seen anything; if her occupation as a nightclub singer (a less-than-respectable job) is exposed, she could be deprived custody of her daughter. A merchant seaman seen furtively hiding in the dark environs of the crime is arrested as the first suspect, but he is merely an adulterer having an affair with a married woman. Dr. Bernard realizes he is not the guilty party.

In the meantime, a peculiarly shy, self-effacing language teacher, Professor Ulber, who is always dressed in a black overcoat, is seen stalking a little girl. He disables the elevator in her apartment building and catches her on the stairs and kills her. The police set a trap for the killer by staking out a little girl on a sidewalk while they watch from a nearby car. The Professor, though tempted by this bait, narrowly evades it. By coincidence, however, the Professor is an admirer of Cora, one of Amalia’s co-workers at the nightclub, whom the Professor frequently visits, but only to stare at her because he is pathologically inhibited, and Cora merely tolerates while ridiculing him, which aggravates his deviant lust for children’s blood.

Dr. Bernard, the Prosecutor, is very solicitous of his wheelchair-using wife, who exhibits the virtues of a saint. He is sexually frustrated, and when he questions Amalia again because he is sure she lied to him, he cannot resist the opportunity to seize and kiss her, although Amalia rebuffs him. Amalia does, however, admit to Dr. Bernard that she saw the vampire through her window and explains to him why she did not want to become involved. The police suspect that the owner of the nightclub, Gastón, has returned to trafficking in narcotics, and they stage a raid of his club in which he is shot and killed and the club is closed. Out of a job, Amalia brings her daughter home from school and one afternoon leaves her with Cora while she departs on an errand.

It is at this point that Professor Ulber, the vampire, comes to visit Cora, who, not realizing that Ulber is the vampire, gets rid of him by telling him to take Amalia’s daughter out for a walk, during which Ulber takes her on rides at an amusement park, creating suspense that he may kill her too. Ulber has a habit of whistling a tune that he was heard whistling by some homeless street beggars while escorting one of the little girls he is going to kill. The tune, not identified in the film, is one of the numbers from the Norwegian composer Edvard Grieg’s Peer Gynt Suite, “The Hall of the Mountain King.” One of the street beggars, a Norwegian, recognizes it, and when he hears it again while Ulber is walking by with Amalia’s daughter, he sounds the alarm and all the beggars as well as the police chase and catch Ulber, rescuing Amalia’s daughter in the process. Unlike the dénouement in the film “M” (which inspired this film), in which the outcome of the serial killer’s trial is left untold, Ulber is sentenced to death, by hanging.

== Cast ==
- Olga Zubarry as Amalia / Rita
- Roberto Escalada as Dr. Bernard
- Nathán Pinzón as Teodoro Ulber, 'El profesor'
- Nelly Panizza as Cora
- Georges Rivière as Presunto culpable
- Pascual Pelliciota as Gastón
- Gloria Castilla as Sra. Bernard
- Mariano Vidal Molina as Lange
- Mathilde García Lange
- Enrique Fava as El noruego
- Ricardo Argemí as Juez
- Absalón Bernal
- Emma Bernal as Srta. Fermina
- Lucía Besse
- Alberto Barcel as defense lawyer

== Reception ==
This adaptation of Fritz Lang’s M is highly regarded but not widely known. The Film Noir Foundation regards it as “extraordinary in every respect.”
