= Dawn of Life =

1950 Venezuelan film

- Directed by: Fernando Cortés
- Written by: Guillermo Fuentes
- Produced by: Luis Guillermo Villegas Blanco
- Starring: Susana Guízar; Luis Salazar; Néstor Zavarce
- Music by: Eduardo Serrano
- Production company: Bolívar Film
- Distributed by: Bolívar Film
- Release date: 1 November 1950
- Country: Venezuela
- Language: Spanish

Dawn of Life (Spanish: Amanecer a la vida) is a 1950 Venezuelan drama film directed by Fernando Cortés and starring Susana Guízar, Luis Salazar and Néstor Zavarce.

== Cast ==
- Susana Guízar
- Luis Salazar
- Néstor Zavarce
- Tomás Henríquez
- Jorge Reyes
- Helvia Hazz de Zapata
- Leon Bravo
- Leopoldo Alvarez
- David Peraza
- Olga Corser
- Herminia de Martucci
- Berta Moncayo
- Jorge Tuero
- Paul Antillano
- Maria Garcia
- Josefina Briseño
- Gilberto Pinto
- Eva y Miguel as Pareja de Baile

== Bibliography ==
- Darlene J. Sadlier. Latin American Melodrama: Passion, Pathos, and Entertainment. University of Illinois Press, 2009.
