= Piantadino =

1950 Argentine film by Francisco Múgica

- Directed by: Francisco Múgica
- Written by: Carlos A. Petit; Rodolfo Sciammarella
- Starring: Pepe Iglesias; Norma Giménez; Juan José Porta
- Music by: Juan Ehlert
- Release date: 1950
- Running time: 65 minutes
- Country: Argentina
- Language: Spanish

Piantadino is a 1950 Argentine comedy film directed by Francisco Múgica during the classical era of Argentine cinema. The film is based on the cartoon character of the same name created by Adolfo Mazzone.

== Plot ==
While working for an insurance company, Piantadino, a shy man, is selected by sly characters to insure some things that they will later make disappear. Though Piantadino lacks courage, he nonetheless uncovers the fraudulent activity, making a positive impression on his fiancée's father.

== Cast ==
- Pepe Iglesias as Piantadino
- Norma Giménez
- Juan José Porta
- Carlos Fioriti
- Rodolfo Onetto
- Arturo Arcari
- Gregorio Barrios
- Max Citelli
- Rafael Diserio
- Cirilo Etulain
- José Maurer
- Enrique Vico Carré

== Comic strip character ==
Piantadino was a classic comic strip character created by one of Argentina's most notable comics artists and humorists, Adolfo Mazzone. Piantadino was Mazzone's best known character. The name Piantadino is a diminutive of "Piantado", which means mentally disturbed person, half-mad or, a person who escapes, whether that be physically or just from a situation.

First appearing in the newspaper El Mundo in 1941, Piantadino, the daily comic strip, followed the adventures of a convict who behaved in jail as if he were on a pension. With the characters Afanancio and Barili, the three formed a sympathetic trio of scoundrels. The character subsequently appeared in Guillermo Divito's magazine Rico Tipo. Piantadino was adapted for cinema in 1950. In the 1970s and 1980s, the comic strip was re-published as a comic magazine.

== Film production ==
Piantadino was made into a film by Emelco-Cinematográfica Interamericana. The script was written by Carlos A. Petit and Rodolfo Sciamarella, and the film was directed by Francisco Mugica. It was filmed in black-and-white. The elusive convict was played by Pepe Iglesias, known for his title role in El Zorro pierde el pelo. Other stars were Norma Giménez, Juan José Porta and Rodolfo Onetto. Carlos Fioriti played Afanancio and Rafael Diserio played Batilio. The film premiered at the Ocean cinema on March 24, 1950.
