= Surprise Hour =

- Release date: 1941
- Country: Argentina
- Language: Spanish

Surprise Hour (Spanish: La Hora de las sorpresas) is a 1941 Argentine film of the Golden Age of Argentine cinema.

== Plot ==
As a result of a bet, a wealthy young woman (Rita Moreno) agrees to participate in a very popular radio audition, run by a handsome mogul (Pedro Quartucci)

== Cast ==
- Pedro Quartucci
- Rosita Moreno
- Esteban Serrador
- Marcos Caplán
- Héctor Calcaño
- Héctor Méndez
- Lydia Lamaison
- Juana Sujo
