= La sangre y la semilla =

- Directed by: Alberto Du Bois
- Written by: Mario Halley Mora; Augusto Roa Bastos
- Produced by: Benjamìn Bogado
- Starring: César Alvarez Blanco; Ernesto Baez; Raul Valentino Benítez
- Cinematography: Luis Galán de Tierra
- Edited by: Rosalino Caterbeti; Jorge Levillotti
- Music by: Herminio Giménez
- Release date: 12 November 1959
- Running time: 82 minutes
- Countries: Argentina; Paraguay
- Languages: Spanish; Guaraní

La sangre y la semilla is a 1959 Argentine-Paraguayan film, directed by Alberto Du Bois. Produced in Spanish and Guaraní, it was shot in the Paraguayan city of Itauguá. It stars Argentine actress Olga Zubarry and the Paraguayan Ernesto Báez in the leading roles. Written by Augusto Roa Bastos, based on a story by Mario Halley Mora, it is a historical film set in 1870 at the end of the Paraguayan War, during the exodus of the last followers of President Francisco Solano López to Cerro Corá (1870). The film premiered on 12 November 1959.

== Plot ==
Paquita, the widow of a Paraguayan officer, rescues a wounded sergeant who has been a companion of her husband. She takes care of him and nurtures him back to health. But they only have one hope, to keep fighting for Paraguay against the Argentine Army.

== Cast ==
- César Alvarez Blanco
- Ernesto Báez
- Raul Valentino Benítez
- Leandro Cacavellos
- Roque Centurión Miranda
- Celia Elís
- José Guisone
- Carlos Gómez
- Mercedes Jané
- Mario Prono
- Romualdo Quiroga
- Rafael Rojas Doria
- Miguel Angel Yegros
- Olga Zubarry
