= Susana Guízar =

Mexican actress

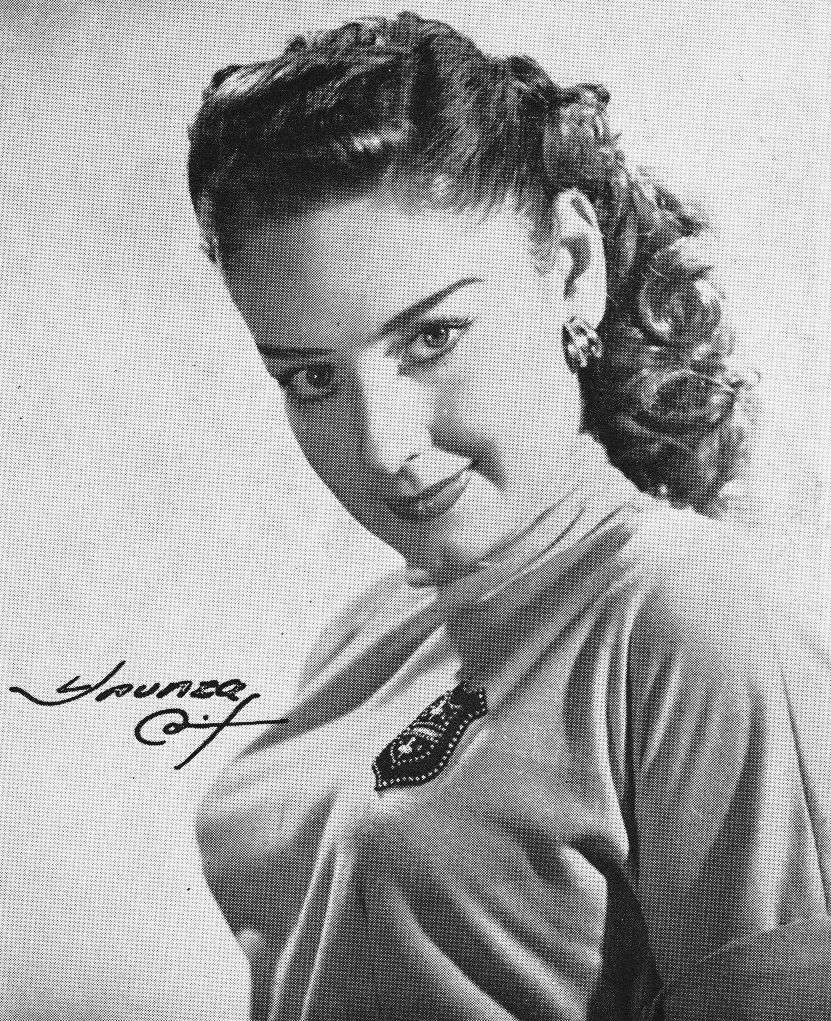
- Susana Guízar in 1954
- Born: 17 August 1922; Pátzcuaro, Michoacán, Mexico
- Died: 3 June 1997 (aged 75); Mexico City, Mexico
- Occupation: Actress
- Years active: 1939–1952 (film)

Susana Guízar (1922–1997) was a Mexican film actress.

== Selected filmography ==
- The Queen of the River (1939)
- Neither Blood Nor Sand (1941)
- Jesusita in Chihuahua (1942)
- Alejandra (1942)
- The Two Orphans (1944)
- Lady Windermere's Fan (1944)
- The House of the Fox (1945)
- The Associate (1946)
- Madam Temptation (1948)
- Dawn of Life (1950)

== Bibliography ==
- Isabel Arredondo. Motherhood in Mexican Cinema, 1941-1991: The Transformation of Femininity on Screen. McFarland, 2013.
