= Seven Women (1944 film) =

- Directed by: Benito Perojo
- Written by: Arturo Cerretani; Benito Perojo
- Based on: Los hijos de la noche 1939 play by Leandro Navarro; Adolfo Torrado
- Produced by: Kurt Land
- Starring: Olga Casares Pearson; Carlos Lagrotta; Silvia Legrand
- Cinematography: Pablo Tabernero
- Music by: Paul Misraki
- Production company: Pampa Film
- Release date: 1944
- Running time: 77 minutes
- Country: Argentina
- Language: Spanish

Seven Women (Spanish: Siete Mujeres) is a 1944 Argentine drama film of the classical era of Argentine cinema, directed by Benito Perojo and starring Olga Casares Pearson, Carlos Lagrotta and Silvia Legrand. It was based on a play which was later turned into a 1953 Mexican film of the same title.

== Cast ==
- Olga Casares Pearson as Carmen
- Tito Climent
- César Fiaschi
- Lucy Galián
- Malú Gatica
- Carlos Lagrotta as Enrique
- Silvia Legrand as Carmen
- Claudio Martino
- Nuri Montsé
- Perla Nelson as Perla
- Elsa O'Connor as Doña Isabel
- Silvana Roth as Isabel
- María Santos
- Ernesto Vilches as Miguel

== Bibliography ==
- de España, Rafael. Directory of Spanish and Portuguese film-makers and films. Greenwood Press, 1994.
