= La casta Susana =

La Casta Susana
- Directed by: Benito Perojo
- Written by: Georg Okonkowski (libretto); Maurice Desvallières (play); Antony Mars (play)
- Produced by: Pampa Films
- Starring: Mirtha Legrand; Juan Carlos Thorry; Alberto Bello
- Cinematography: Pablo Tabernero
- Edited by: Kurt Land
- Music by: Jean Gilbert (operetta)
- Release date: 1944
- Running time: 95 minutes
- Country: Argentina
- Language: Spanish

La casta Susana [Chaste Susan] is a 1944 Argentine film of the classical era of Argentine cinema, directed by Benito Perojo. It is based on the operetta Die keusche Susanne.
