= Aquiles Nazoa Cinema =

Coordinates: 10°30′02″N 66°55′13″W

The Aquiles Nazoa Cinema (also known as Aquiles Nazoa Theater) is a multipurpose facility located in the west of the city of Caracas, on the first floor of the Urdaneta Building in the San Juan parish of the Libertador Municipality in the Metropolitan District of Caracas and in the north of the South American country of Venezuela. It is used as a cultural center, cinema and theater.

== History ==
Formerly called Cine Urdaneta, it was inaugurated in 1951 initially with Mexican and American films, but became known and controversial in the past for being used to exhibit adult films since the 60s of the twentieth century until its closure. In 2013 the authorities of the Capital District government recovered it, reopened it and modified its use (Venezuelan, Latin American and world films, theater alternatively), with the name of Aquiles Nazoa, a Venezuelan writer and humorist native of the parish, who died in 1976. At the reinauguration ceremony the relatives of the Venezuelan poet received a post mortem decoration. The El Silencio and Capitolio subway stations are very close so it is easy to access the place using the Caracas Metro.

== See also ==
- Aquiles Nazoa
- Teatro Simón Bolívar
- Teatro Municipal de Caracas
