= Tomás Henríquez =

Venezuelan actor

- Born: 1921; Barlovento, Venezuela
- Died: 24 December 2002 (aged 80–81); Caracas, Venezuela
- Occupation: Actor
- Years active: 1950-1998 (film & TV)

Tomás Henríquez (1921–2002) was a Venezuelan film and television actor.

== Selected filmography ==
- The Yacht Isabel Arrived This Afternoon (1949)
- Dawn of Life (1950)
- Green Territory (1952)
- Simón Bolívar (1969)

== Bibliography ==
- Rist, Peter H. Historical Dictionary of South American Cinema. Rowman & Littlefield, 2014.
