= Adam and the Serpent =

1946 film

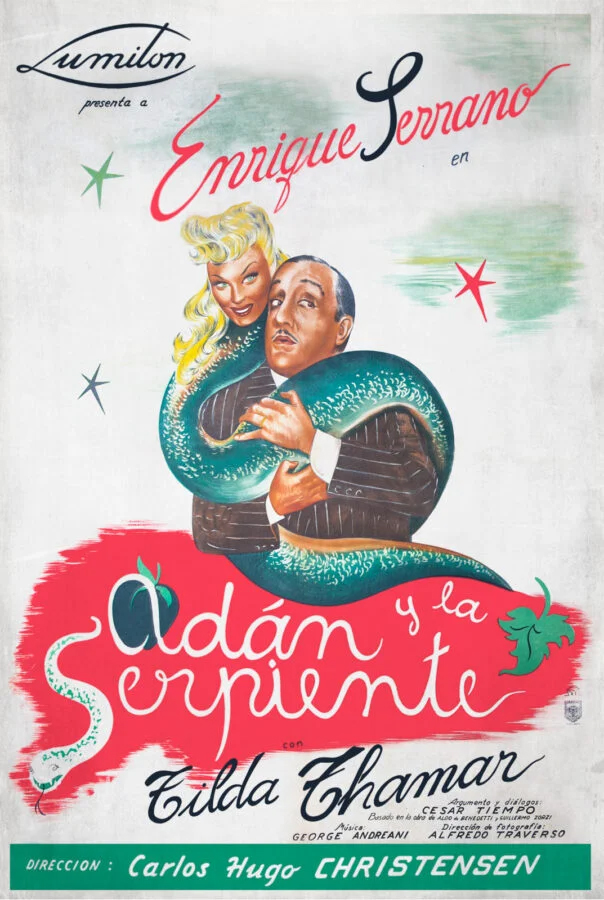
- Theatrical release poster
- Directed by: Carlos Hugo Christensen
- Written by: Aldo De Benedetti
- Starring: Olga Casares Pearson: Alberto de Mendoza; Olga Zubarry
- Music by: George Andreani
- Production company: Lumiton
- Release date: 1946
- Country: Argentina

Adam and the Serpent (Spanish: Adán y la serpiente) is a 1946 Argentine film of the classical era of Argentine cinema, directed by Carlos Hugo Christensen and written by Aldo De Benedetti. The film starred Olga Casares Pearson, Alberto de Mendoza and Olga Zubarry.

== Cast ==
Adam and the Serpent promotional image

- Olga Casares Pearson
- Alberto de Mendoza
- Yeya Duciel
- Tito Gómez
- Rita Juárez
- Ivonne Lescaut
- Diego Martínez
- Iris Martorell
- Héctor Méndez
- Gonzalo Palomero
- Santiago Rebull
- Enrique Serrano
- Juan Siches de Alarcón
- Tilda Thamar
- Olga Zubarry
