= Juan Carlos Thorry =

Argentine actor, musician, and director

- Born: June 28, 1908; Coronel Pringles, Argentina
- Died: February 12, 2000 (aged 91); Buenos Aires
- Occupations: Actor, Director, Tango performer

Juan Carlos Thorry (June 28, 1908, in Coronel Pringles – February 12, 2000 in San Antonio de Padua), born José Antonio Torrontegui, was an Argentine film actor, tango musician and director, notable for his work during the Golden Age of Argentine cinema.

Best known for his work in tango films, he entered the industry in 1935 in El caballo del pueblo, followed by Radio Bar in 1936 and made nearly 60 film appearances between then and his retirement in 1969.

He died in San Antonio de Padua on February 12, 2000, of heart failure.

== Filmography ==
=== Director ===
- Pate Katelin en Buenos Aires (inédita - 1969)
- Somos todos inquilinos (1954)
- Escándalo nocturno (1951)
- El complejo de Felipe (1951)
- That's the Woman I Want (1950)

=== Actor ===
- Las lobas (1986)
- Las barras bravas (1985)
- Superagentes y titanes (1983)
- Buenos Aires Tango (inédita - 1982)
- Esto es vida (not released - 1982)
- Ritmo, amor y primavera (1981)
- Las muñecas que hacen ¡Pum! (1979)
- Convención de vagabundos (1965)
- Cuidado con las colas (1964)
- Dr. Cándido Pérez, señoras (1962)
- Los maridos de mamá (1956)
- Somos todos inquilinos (1954)
- ¡Qué noche de casamiento! (1953)
- Suegra último modelo (1953)
- Asunto terminado (1953)
- Bárbara atómica (1952)
- Vuelva el primero! (1952)
- Especialista en señoras (1951)
- Escándalo nocturno (1951)
- Concierto de bastón (1951)
- ¡Qué hermanita! (1951)
- La comedia inmortal (1951)
- Cuando besa mi marido (1950)
- Piantadino (1950)
- The Demon is an Angel (1949)
- Cita en las estrellas (1949)
- White Horse Inn (1948)
- La serpiente de cascabel (1948)
- El retrato (1947)
- Con el diablo en el cuerpo (1947)
- La señora de Pérez se divorcia (1945)
- La Casta Susana (1944)
- Mi novia es un fantasma (1944)
- La pequeña señora de Pérez (1944)
- The Minister's Daughter (1943)
- Elvira Fernández, vendedora de tiendas (1942)
- El pijama de Adán (1942)
- A Light in the Window (1942)
- En el último piso (1942)
- Los martes, orquídeas (1941)
- I Want to Be a Chorus Girl (1941)
- Honeymoon in Rio (1940)
- Isabelita (1940)
- El solterón (1940)
- Cándida (1939)
- Paths of Faith (1938)
- Villa Discordia (1938)
- Maestro Levita (1938)
- Dos amigos y un amor (1937)
- Radio Bar (1936)
- The Favorite (1935)
