= Escuela Nacional de Cine =

National Film School
- Escuela Nacional de Cine
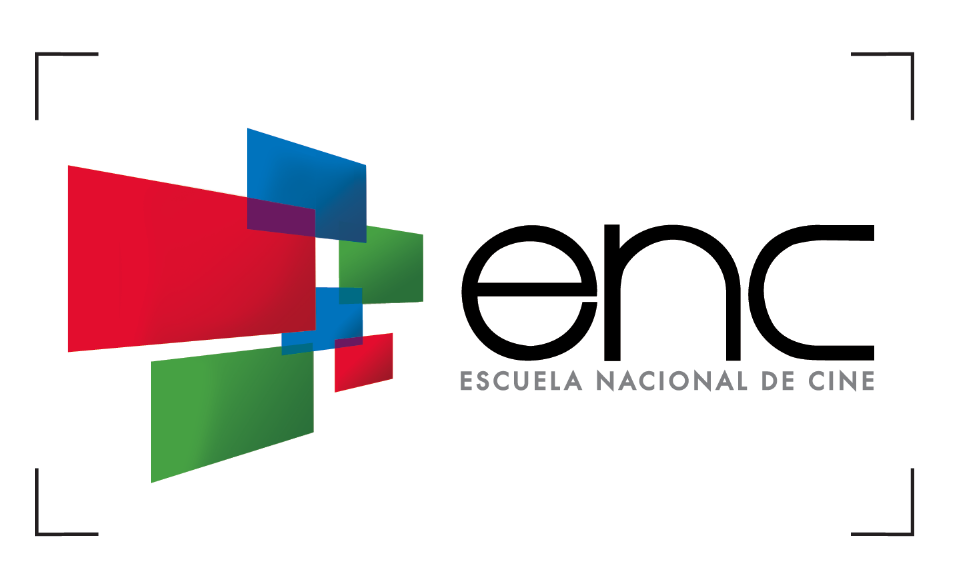
- Logo
- Caracas; Venezuela

Information
- Type: Private school
- Established: March 1, 2009
- School district: Metropolitan District
- Website: www.escuelanacionaldecine.com.ve

The Escuela Nacional de Cine (ENC) (National Film School) is a private educational institution located in Venezuela Caracas Metropolitan District. Founded at the initiative of Bolívar Films as house specializing in cinema studies March 1, 2009.

== History ==
The school has its origins in 2000 under the initiative of director Gabriel Brener who proposed to Bolívar Films to carry out educational seminars and workshops. In 2009, the ENC was formed and began offering 3-year courses the next year. In 2014, the school began partnering with Central University of Venezuela to offer diplomas and credit recognition.
