= 24 Hours in the Life of a Woman (1944 film) =

- Screenplay by: Arturo Cerretani, Tulio Demicheli, Erwin Wallfisch
- Story by: Stefan Zweig (novel)
- Cinematography: Antonio Merayo
- Edited by: Nicolás Proserpio
- Music by: Mario Maurano
- Production company: Argentina Sono Film
- Release date: August 17, 1944
- Country: Argentina
- Language: Spanish

24 Hours in the Life of a Woman (Spanish: 24 Horas en la Vida de una Mujer or Veinticuatro horas en la vida de una mujer) is a 1944 Argentine drama film of the classical era of Argentine cinema, directed by Carlos F. Borcosque and starring Amelia Bence and Roberto Escalada. It is based on the 1927 novel Twenty-Four Hours in the Life of a Woman by the Austrian author Stefan Zweig. Mario Fezia won the Silver Condor Award for Best Sound for the film.

== Cast ==
- Amelia Bence
- Roberto Escalada
- Olga Casares Pearson
- Bernardo Perrone
- Federico Mansilla
- Julio Renato
- Gloria Ferrandiz
- Dario Cossier
- Alba Castellanos
- Ada Cornaro
- Francisco de Paula
- Baby Correa
- José Antonio Paonessa
- Herminia Mas
- Francisco Bastardi
