= Twenty-Four Hours in the Life of a Woman =

1927 novella by Stefan Zweig

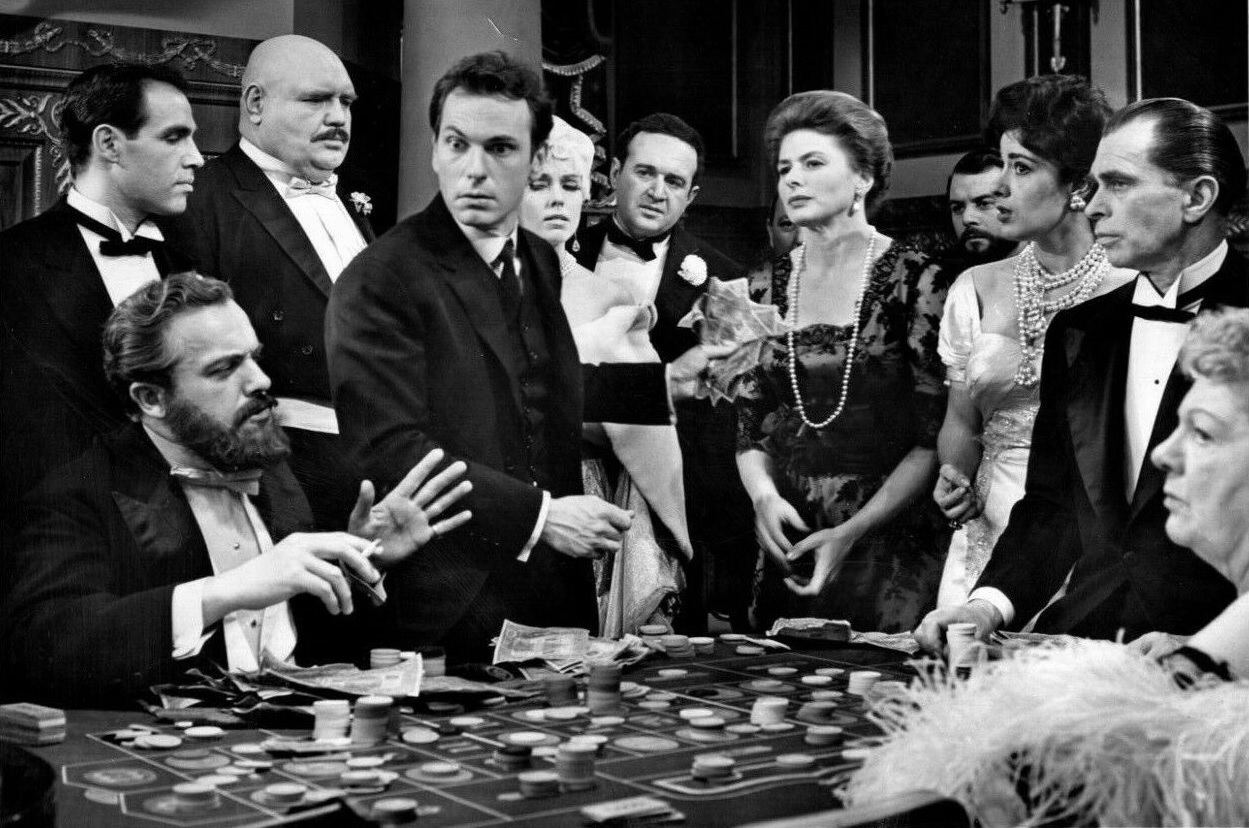
- Rip Torn and Ingrid Bergman in the film version
- Author: Stefan Zweig
- Original title: Vierundzwanzig Stunden aus dem Leben einer Frau
- Translator: Eden Paul; Cedar Paul
- Language: German
- Publisher: Insel-Verlag
- Publication date: 1927; 99 years ago
- Publication place: Germany
- English publication date: 1927

Twenty-Four Hours in the Life of a Woman (German: Vierundzwanzig Stunden aus dem Leben einer Frau) is a 1927 novella by the Austrian writer Stefan Zweig. It was filmed in 1931, 1944, 1952, 1968, and 2002. A television movie, Twenty-Four Hours in a Woman's Life, was telecast in 1961, starring Ingrid Bergman and Rip Torn.

== Plot ==
A scandal erupts at a French Riviera boardinghouse when a respectable married woman suddenly elopes with a young man she met the day before, prompting an elderly English aristocrat named Mrs. C. to confide a long-held secret to the narrator. She recounts how, years earlier as a lonely widow in Monte Carlo, she became captivated by the desperate, expressive hands of a young Polish diplomat who lost his entire fortune at the roulette table and planned to kill himself. Driven by a sudden, overwhelming urge to save him, Mrs. C. intervened, spent a passionate night with him in a cheap hotel, and gave him money to return home after making him swear to abandon gambling forever. However, when she spotted him back at the casino the very next night — where he furiously threw her money back at her in front of the crowd — she fled in humiliation, forever marked by the single day in which her repressed emotions defied reason and social convention.

== See also ==
- 1927 in literature
- Austrian literature
