= 24 Hours in the Life of a Woman (1931 film) =

1931 film

- Directed by: Robert Land
- Written by: Harry Kahn; Friedrich Raff
- Based on: Twenty-Four Hours in the Life of a Woman by Stefan Zweig
- Produced by: Seymour Nebenzal; Henny Porten; Wilhelm von Kaufmann; Ernst Wolff
- Starring: Henny Porten; Walter Rilla; Friedrich Kayßler
- Cinematography: Friedl Behn-Grund; Otto Kanturek
- Edited by: Martha Dübber
- Production companies: Nero Film; Henny Porten Filmproduktion
- Distributed by: Vereinigte Star-Film
- Release date: 12 October 1931
- Running time: 73 minutes
- Country: Germany
- Language: German

24 Hours in the Life of a Woman (German: 24 Stunden aus dem Leben einer Frau) is a 1931 German drama film directed by Robert Land and starring Henny Porten, Walter Rilla and Friedrich Kayßler. It is based on Stefan Zwieg's 1927 novella Twenty-Four Hours in the Life of a Woman. The film was produced by Seymour Nebenzal's Nero Film in conjunction with Porten's own production company. It was shot at the Terra Studios in Berlin. The film's art direction was by Franz Schroedter.

== Plot ==
Helga Vanroh never really got over the death of her husband and has withdrawn from life entirely. Her self-chosen loneliness comes to an abrupt end one day when she meets a young man in the casino who, like her, seems to be a lost soul. This man, Sascha, has misfortune written all over his face. He loses bet after bet when gambling.

Helga is fascinated by him, finally follows Sascha to his hotel and is able to stop the desperate young man from committing suicide at the last moment. The two lonely people find each other, and Helga soon realizes that he has become more for her - more than a fleeting acquaintance, more than she originally wanted to allow. She spends the following day with him and eventually provides him with the financial means to break his apparent gambling addiction and travel on.

The young man then promises Helga that he will return to his homeland in view of the unexpected windfall. But Sascha is weak, and so Helga, to her great disappointment, has to realize that he is back at the gaming table the following evening, because his passion is stronger than any good intentions.

== Cast ==
- Henny Porten as Helga Vanroh
- Walter Rilla as Sascha Lonay
- Friedrich Kayßler as Professor Merk
- Margo Lion as Frau Köhler
- Hermine Sterler as Erika
- Maria Koppenhöfer as Spielbankbesucherin
- Walter Steinbeck as Hotelgast
- Hadrian Maria Netto as Sekretär

== Bibliography ==
- Grange, William (2008). Cultural Chronicle of the Weimar Republic. Lanham, MD: Scarecrow Press. ISBN 978-0-8108-5967-8.
