= Alberto de Mendoza =

Argentine actor (1923–2011)

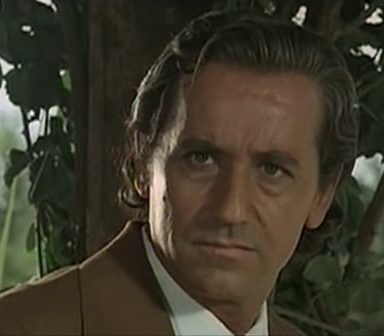
- De Mendoza in The Forgotten Pistolero (1969)
- Born: 21 January 1923; Buenos Aires, Argentina
- Died: 12 December 2011 (aged 88); Madrid, Spain
- Years active: 1945–2011
- Spouse: Mabel Taboas

Alberto Manuel Rodríguez-Gallego González de Mendoza (21 January 1923 – 12 December 2011) was an Argentine film actor who appeared in some 114 films between 1930 and 2005, spanning eight decades.

== Biography ==
A lifelong figure in Argentine films, De Mendoza appeared in film such as Adán y la serpiente in 1946 and A hierro muere in 1962 often working alongside Olga Zubarry. In the late 1960s and 1970, he appeared in a number of spaghetti Westerns, and also had a prominent role in the 1973 horror classic Horror Express, in which he co-starred alongside Christopher Lee, Peter Cushing and Telly Savalas.

De Mendoza is better known to audiences in Argentina for his role in the popular TV series El Rafa, aired from 1980 to 1982, or the less successful El Oriental, aired from 1982 to 1983. He died in Madrid on 12 December 2011, at age 88.

He was the stepfather of journalist Daniel Ruiz, better known as Daniel Mendoza, having adopted his stepfather's surname.

== Selected filmography ==
- 1930: Alma de Gaucho - Carlos
- 1939: Murió el sargento Laprida
- 1939: ...Y mañana serán hombres
- 1942: El viejo Hucha
- 1942: Un nuevo amanecer
- 1944: His Best Student
- 1944: Se rematan ilusiones
- 1945: The Phantom Lady
- 1946: Adán y la serpiente - (uncredited)
- 1946: Inspiración
- 1947: El retrato
- 1948: Story of a Bad Woman
- 1948: La novia de la marina
- 1949: Don Juan Tenorio
- 1949: Un hombre solo no vale nada
- 1949: Miguitas en la cama
- 1949: La cuna vacía
- 1950: Filomena Marturano
- 1950: Madre Alegría
- 1950: The Marihuana Story - Lt. DeLuca
- 1951: Suburb
- 1951: Pasó en mi barrio - Mingo
- 1952: Ellos nos hicieron así
- 1954: La calle del pecado
- 1954: Caídos en el infierno
- 1954: Barrio Gris - Claudio
- 1955: La mujer desnuda
- 1955: La noche de Venus
- 1956: ¡Que seas feliz! - Pablo Suárez
- 1956: La adúltera - Carlos Alatorre
- 1957: La Dulce Enemiga - Ricardo
- 1957: La bestia humana
- 1957: La mujer marcada - Rodolfo Morán alias El Sudamericano
- 1958: Socios para la aventura
- 1958: El jefe
- 1960: Yo quiero vivir contigo
- 1960: El Asalto
- 1962: Searching for Monica - Antonio Montes
- 1962: A hierro muere - Fernando Sempere
- 1962: You and Me Are Three - Rodolfo Céspedes / Adolfo Céspedes
- 1962: Queen of the Chantecler - Federico de la Torre
- 1963: The Blackmailers - Vergara 'El Americano'
- 1963: Scaramouche - Roger - Marquis de la Tour
- 1963: A Nearly Decent Girl - Carlos García-Manzanares y Soler
- 1964: Primero yo
- 1964: Un tiro por la espalda
- 1965: The Dictator's Guns - Hugo Hendrix
- 1965: Secuestro en la ciudad - José
- 1966: That Man George - Travis
- 1966: Las locas del conventillo - Manuel
- 1967: Los guardiamarinas - Comandante de Brigada Carlos Torres
- 1967: The Desperate Ones - Hamlat
- 1968: Volver a vivir - Garrido
- 1969: Rebus - Zakir, Police Captain
- 1969: Psychout for Murder - Francesco
- 1969: Las secretarias - Don Carlos
- 1969: A Bullet for Rommel - SS Major Hermann Traniger
- 1969: Una sull'altra - Henry Dumurrier
- 1969: The Forgotten Pistolero - Tomas
- 1969: A Bullet for Sandoval - Lucky Boy
- 1970: De profesión, sus labores - Juan Montesinos
- 1970: Manos torpes - Latimore
- 1971: The Strange Vice of Mrs. Wardh - Neil Wardh
- 1971: A Lizard in a Woman's Skin - Sgt. Brandon
- 1971: Los corsarios - The Duke
- 1971: Human Cobras - George MacGreves
- 1971: The Case of the Scorpion's Tail - John Stanley
- 1971: La Folie des grandeurs directed by Gérard Oury) - Charles II, King of Spain
- 1972: Las colocadas - Enrique
- 1972: Horror Express - Father Pujardov
- 1973: Special Killers - Giorgio Russo
- 1974: Hold-Up, instantánea de una corrupción - Ashley
- 1974: Open Season - Martin
- 1974: And Then There Were None - Otto Martino
- 1974: To Love Ophelia - Piero Criscione - the lawyer
- 1975: Una abuelita de antes de la guerra - Juan
- 1975: What Changed Charley Farthing? - Jumbo
- 1975: La Joven casada - Padre de Jorge
- 1975: Zorrita Martínez - Antonio
- 1976: Fulanita y sus menganos - Manolo
- 1976: Último deseo - Prof. Fulton
- 1976: El erotismo y la informática - Gonzalo Garcés
- 1977: The Man Who Knew Love - Juan de Ávila
- 1977: La violación
- 1977: Cazar un gato negro - David
- 1978: Avisa a Curro Jiménez - El Jandalo
- 1978: Venus de fuego
- 1978: Striptease - George
- 1978: Sentados al borde de la mañana, con los pies colgando - Sr. Empresa
- 1979: 7 ragazze di classe
- 1979: Manaos - Mario Buendía
- 1980: La amante ingenua
- 1980: El infierno tan temido
- 1981: The Underground Man - Diego Carmona
- 1984: Noches sin lunas ni soles - Cairo
- 1984: Los tigres de la memoria
- 1995: Y peque Carlos, peque
- 1996: Lola Mora
- 2000: Bossa Nova - Juan
- 2001: Lua de Outubro - Marcial Lopes
- 2003: Cleopatra - Víctor
- 2005: Tapas - Mariano
- 2011: La mala verdad - Ernesto (final film role)

== TV series ==
- 1980-1982 – El Rafa
- 1982 - El Oriental
