= Tres citas con el destino =

- Directed by: Fernando de Fuentes
- Written by: Alejandro Verbitzky; Alberto Girri; Emilio Villalba Welsh; Miguel Mihura
- Produced by: Gonzalo Elvira (as Gonzalo Elvira R.); Joaquín Reig; Alberto Soifer
- Starring: Manuel Arbó; Ricardo Argemí (as Argemí); Félix Briones; José Castellón
- Edited by: José W. Bustos; Joaquín Ceballos (assistant editor)
- Music by: Jesús González Gancy
- Production companies: Oro Films; Plus Ultra; Unión Films; Estudios Cinematográficos del Tepeyac; Libertador; Estudios CEA C. Lineal
- Distributed by: CEA Distribución (Spain); Unión Films S.A. (Spain)
- Release date: 1954
- Running time: 97 min
- Country: Mexico
- Language: Spanish

Tres citas con el destino ("Three Dates With Destiny") is a 1954 Mexican film directed by Fernando de Fuentes.

== Cast ==
- Manuel Arbó
- Ricardo Argemí...(as Argemí)
- Félix Briones
- José Castellón
- Fernando Cortés
- Juana Cáceres
- Fernando Galiana
- Carmela de Gracia
- Sara Guasch
- Santiago Gómez Cou
- Narciso Ibáñez Menta
- Maurice Jouvet
- Jorge Mistral
- Tito Novaro
- Nathán Pinzón
