= Olga Casares Pearson =

Argentine actress

Olga Casares Pearson (1896–1980) was an Argentine actress of the 1940s and 1950s considered the Golden Age of Argentine Cinema. She first appeared in film in 1929 but it wasn't until ten years later that her career took off in Argentine cinema.

She appeared in over 20 films, including Adán y la serpiente in 1946 alongside actors such as Olga Zubarry and Alberto de Mendoza.

== Filmography ==
- 1929: Corazón ante la ley
- 1939: La intrusa
- 1943: Casa de muñecas
- 1944: Mi novia es un fantasma
- 1944: 24 horas en la vida de una mujer
- 1944: Nuestra Natacha
- 1945: Bluebeard's Six Mothers-in-Law
- 1945: Siete mujeres
- 1945: Llegó la niña Ramona
- 1946: Adán y la serpiente
- 1947: Los hijos del otro
- 1947: El hombre que amé
- 1948: María de los Ángeles
- 1949: La otra y yo
- 1950: Esposa último modelo
- 1951: Con la música en el alma
- 1954: Valparaiso Express
- 1956: Surcos en el mar
- 1957: Operación Antartida
