= Pepe Iglesias =

Argentine comediain

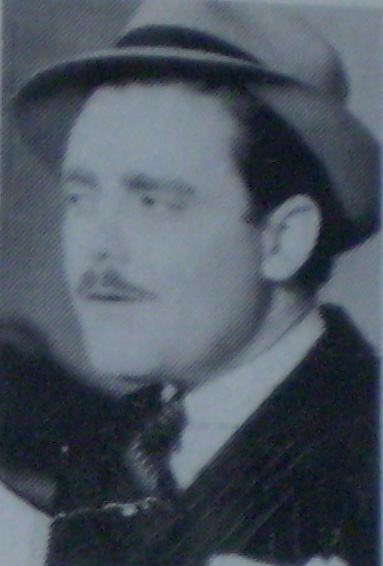
- Pepe Iglesias (unknown date).
- Born: José Ángel Iglesias Sánchez; February 11, 1915; Buenos Aires, Argentina
- Died: March 4, 1991 (aged 88); Santiago de Chile, Chile
- Other name: El Zorro
- Occupation: Actor
- Website: http://www.pepeiglesiaselzorro.com.ar/

Pepe Iglesias (February 11, 1915 in Buenos Aires – March 4, 1991 in Santiago de Chile), full name José Ángel Iglesias Sánchez, nicknamed El Zorro (The Fox), was an Argentine comedian, who, though he developed much of his career in his home country, also spent time in Chile and Spain. At the 1945 Argentine Film Critics Association Awards Iglesias won the Silver Condor Award for Best Actor in a Comic Role for his performance in Mi novia es un fantasma (1944).

== Biography ==
Son of Spanish immigrants, he developed his career in his native land of Argentina, before settling in Spain in May 1952. Soon after, he made his debut with the Spanish public through a local radio station in Barcelona.

The following year, he appeared Ramon Torrado's film Que Loco!, alongside Pepe Isbert and Emma Penella.

He was then signed by Cadena SER and became one of Spain's highest paid radio stars. He had an ability to play different voices, attributed to different people, like 'Don Tapadera' and 'Finado Fernández' who was considered one of the most popular. All of these were living in the imaginary One Bed Hotel, where there is anger all week. Iglesias, under the nickname 'The Fox' became one of the leading comics of the Spanish 50s.

The taglines of his shows soon passed into everyday language, and it became common to hear one, followed by a whistled theme tune, which was whistled by Iglesias.

With the advent of television in Spain, Iglesias tried his luck at the new media (Gran Parada). However, his form of linguistic comedy did not survive the adaptations necessary for the changing times.

== Films ==
Year	Title
1938	Dos amigos y un amor
1939	24 horas en libertad
1944	Mi novia es un fantasma
1945	Llegó la niña Ramona
1946	El tercer huésped
1947	Un ángel sin pantalones
1948	El barco sale a las diez
1948	Recuerdos de un angel
1949	Una noche en el Ta-Ba-Rín
1949	Wiseguy
1950	El Zorro pierde el pelo
1950	Piantadino
1951	El heroico Bonifacio
1951	Si usted no puede, yo sí (as Pepe Iglesias 'El Zorro')
1952	Como yo no hay dos
1952	Los sobrinos del Zorro
1953	¡Che, qué loco!
1955	Pobre pero honrado
