= Amador Bendayán =

Venezuelan actor and entertainer

- Born: November 11, 1920; Villa de Cura, Aragua, Venezuela
- Died: August 4, 1989 (aged 68)
- Occupation: television
- Years active: 1937–1989

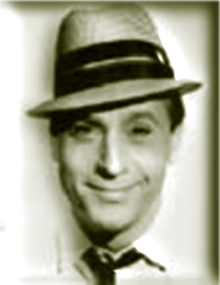
Amador in the late 1950s.

Amador Jacobo Bendayán Bendayán [ben-dah-IAN] (November 11, 1920 – August 4, 1989) was a Venezuelan actor and entertainer.

== Biography ==
The son of Moroccan Jewish immigrants, Bendayán was born in Villa de Cura, Aragua, and was raised and educated in Caracas. He started his career in radio in 1937 as an announcer and comedian.

Bendayán gained a huge popularity for his comedies El Bachiller y Bartolo (1949–59) and La Bodega de la Esquina (1950–1960), and when it went from radio to television, his popularity – and his audience – continued to grow. He also appeared in several movies in Mexico and Venezuela from 1947 through 1971 and worked in The Amador News, a satirical TV-news parody, in the mid-1960s.

In 1968, Bendayán was hired by Radio Caracas Televisión to host Sábado Espectacular, a five-hour marathon variety show which lasted through 1971. A year later he moved to Venevisión, as the show was renamed Sábado Sensacional.

Bendayán hosted his show until 1988, a few months before his death in Caracas, aged 68. Gilberto Correa succeeded him as host of the show.

Amador Bendayán was the founder and first president of Casa del Artista, a cultural center which is located in a boulevard named after him, in an area next to the Santa Rosa church, a synagogue, and a mosque.

== Selected filmography ==
- Misión atómica (1947)
- Yo quiero una mujer así (1951)
- Seis meses de vida (1951)
- Yo y las mujeres (1959)
- Si yo fuera millonario [aka If I Were a Millionaire] (1962)
- El idolo (1963)
- Napoleoncito (1964)
- Escuela para solteras (1965)
- El Pícaro (1967)
- El Reportero [aka The Reporter] (1968)
- Departamento de soltero (1971)
- O.K. Cleopatra (1971)

Media offices
Preceded by none	Host of Sábado Espectacular/Sensacional; 1968-1988	Succeeded by Gilberto Correa; 1988-1996
