= Green Territory =

- Film poster
- Directed by: Horacio Peterson; Ariel Severino
- Written by: Guillermo Fuentes
- Produced by: Luis Maria Poleo; Luis Guillermo Villegas Blanco
- Starring: Elena Fernan; Luis Salazar; Maria Luisa Sandoval
- Edited by: Alcides Longa
- Music by: Kurt Lowenthal
- Production companies: Bolívar Film; Peliculas Venezolanas
- Distributed by: Bolívar Film
- Release date: 21 January 1952
- Country: Venezuela
- Language: Spanish

Green Territory (Spanish:Territorio verde) is a 1952 Venezuelan drama film directed by Horacio Peterson and Ariel Severino and starring Elena Fernan, Luis Salazar and Maria Luisa Sandoval.

== Cast ==
- Elena Fernan
- Luis Salazar
- Maria Luisa Sandoval
- Tomás Henríquez as Maestro
- Alberto de Paz y Mateos as Cura
- Pura Vargas as La Bruja
- Alberto Castillo Arraez as Jefe Civil
- Miro Anton
- Francisco Bernal as El Bobo
- Saúl Peraza
- Ildemaro García

== Bibliography ==
- Darlene J. Sadlier. Latin American Melodrama: Passion, Pathos, and Entertainment. University of Illinois Press, 2009.
