= César Miguel Rondón =

César Miguel Rondón (born November 18, 1953, in Mexico City) is a Venezuelan writer, journalist, broadcaster, advertising executive, and radio and television presenter of Mexican origin.

== Biography ==
Born in Mexico City, he is the son of Venezuelan parents who had gone into exile during the regime of Marcos Pérez Jiménez; the family returned to Venezuela after the dictatorship was overthrown. His father, César Rondón Lovera, held diplomatic posts in Cuba, Jamaica, and Panama.

He studied philosophy at the Central University of Venezuela and Social Communication at Andrés Bello Catholic University.

== Media careerc ==
=== Print journalism ===
He began as a film critic for the magazine Summa in 1972, later taking charge of the culture pages at the newspaper El Globo. He also worked at Séptimo Día, the weekly supplement of El Nacional, and other outlets, mostly in cultural coverage. In 1975, together with Marcelino Bisbal, he was one of the student founders of Revista Comunicación.

In 1978 he moved to New York City and continued writing for Venezuelan newspapers, including El Nacional, El Diario de Caracas, and Meridiano. While living in the United States he met the leading figures of salsa music, gathering the material and research that led him to write El Libro de la Salsa ("The Salsa Book"), which a 2005 review called "a classic of Latin music" and a required reference for those wanting to learn about Caribbean music. During this period he was also part of the founding editorial team of the Spanish-language edition of Billboard.

He returned to Venezuela in 1981, where he continued working as a journalist and columnist for El Nacional.

=== Broadcasting ===
He began his broadcasting career in 1974 at Radio Nacional de Venezuela with the program A Paso de Transeúnte, and went on to produce and host music, news, interview, and opinion programs for several stations. From 1991 he hosted the morning drive-time program on Éxitos 99.9 FM, reaching a national audience through Circuito Unión Radio, until the program went off the air. From 1998 to 2006 he also hosted La Entrevista con César Miguel Rondón on the network's 90.3 FM and 1090 AM stations, as well as El Libro de la Salsa en Radio on Onda.
