= The Demon is an Angel =

- Film poster
- Directed by: Carlos Hugo Christensen
- Starring: Susana Freyre; Juana Sujo; Juan Carlos Thorry
- Production company: Bolívar Films
- Distributed by: Bolívar Films
- Release date: 1949
- Country: Venezuela
- Language: Spanish

The Demon is an Angel (Spanish:Un ángel sin pudor) is a 1949 Venezuelan comedy film directed by Carlos Hugo Christensen and starring Susana Freyre, Juana Sujo and Juan Carlos Thorry.

== Cast ==
- Susana Freyre
- Juana Sujo
- Juan Carlos Thorry

== Bibliography ==
- Darlene J. Sadlier. Latin American Melodrama: Passion, Pathos, and Entertainment. University of Illinois Press, 2009.
