= 24 Hours in the Life of a Woman (2002 film) =

24 Heures de la vie d'une femme
- French Poster
- Directed by: Laurent Bouhnik
- Screenplay by: Gilles Taurand; Laurent Bouhnik
- Produced by: Étienne Comar
- Cinematography: Gilles Henry
- Edited by: Hervé de Luze; Jacqueline Mariani
- Music by: Michael Nyman
- Release date: 7 September 2002
- Running time: 107 minutes
- Country: France
- Language: French
- Budget: $10.6 million
- Box office: $2.1 million

24 Heures de la vie d'une femme is a 2002 film by Laurent Bouhnik, based on the 1927 novel 24 Stunden aus dem Leben einer Frau by Stefan Zweig. The music is by Michael Nyman, and the accompanying soundtrack album is his 45th.

== Cast ==
- Agnès Jaoui as Marie Collins Brown
- Michel Serrault as Louis
- Clément Van Den Bergh as Young Louis
- Bérénice Bejo as Olivia
- Nikolaj Coster-Waldau as Anton
- Bruno Slagmulder as Herve
- Frances Barber as Betty
- Pascal Greggory as casino player
- Valérie Dréville as Henriette
- Serge Riaboukine as Maurice
- Chloé Lambert as boarder
- François Caron as blond boarder

== Soundtrack ==
24 Heures de la vie d'une femme

Soundtrack album by Michael Nyman
- Released: 8 January 2003
- Recorded: April, 2002, Sony Music Studios, London
- Genre: Soundtrack, Contemporary classical
- Length: 65:06
- Label: Naïve

Michael Nyman chronology
| Facing Goya (2002) | 24 Heures de la vie d'une femme (2003) | Sangam: Michael Nyman Meets Indian Masters (2003) |

=== Track listing ===
| No. | Title | English translation | Length |
|---|---|---|---|
| 1. | "Le Récit De Marie" | The Story of Marie | 1:54 |
| 2. | "Prélude" | Prelude | 2:00 |
| 3. | "24 Heures De La Vie D'Une Femme" | 24 Hours in the Life of a Woman | 2:19 |
| 4. | "Les Souvenirs De Louis" | Louis' Souvenirs | 3:24 |
| 5. | "Promenade Nocturne – Orchestre" | A Night Walk – Orchestra | 2:07 |
| 6. | "Le Cheval Blanc" | The White Horse | 5:26 |
| 7. | "Jeux Nocturnes" | Night Games | 3:22 |
| 8. | "En Quittant Le Manoir" | Leaving The Manor | 2:36 |
| 9. | "En Découvrant La Côte D'Azur" | Discovering The Riviera | 2:28 |
| 10. | "Le Casino" | The Casino | 2:47 |
| 11. | "Anton Le Flambeur" | Anton The Gambler | 3:25 |
| 12. | "Tentation Et Désespoir" | Temptation And Distress | 2:56 |
| 13. | "Nuit D'Orage" | The Rainstorm | 3:56 |
| 14. | "Amants Passionnés" | Passionate Lovers | 2:35 |
| 15. | "Au Lever Du Jour" | The Morning After | 2:43 |
| 16. | "Le Serment" | The Pledge | 3:03 |
| 17. | "Course Vers La Gare" | Rushing to the Station | 1:31 |
| 18. | "Marie Rejetée" | Marie Is Rejected | 5:35 |
| 19. | "Olivia Sous La Douche" | Olivia in the Shower | 2:33 |
| 20. | "Un Vrai Secret" | A True Secret | 3:48 |
| 21. | "Promenade Nocturne – Piano Et Orchestre" | A Night Walk – Piano And Orchestra | 2:07 |
| 22. | "Epilogue" | Epilogue | 2:09 |

=== Personnel ===
- Michael Nyman Orchestra
- Catherine Thompson, violin (leader)
- Edward Coxon, violin
- Dermot Crehan, violin
- Beverley Davison, violin
- Ian Humphries, violin
- Philippa Ibbotson, violin
- Patrick Kiernan, violin
- Buguslav Kostecki, violin
- Julian Leaper, violin
- Perry Montague-Mason, violin
- Everton Nelson, violin
- Maciej Rakowski, violin
- Sonia Slany, violin
- Phillip D'Arcy, viola
- Catherine Musker, viola
- Andrew Parker, viola
- Bruce Roberts, viola
- Rachel Roberts, viola
- Sophie Harris, cello
- Anthony Hinnigan, cello
- William Schofield, cello
- David Roach, soprano, alto sax
- Simon Haram, soprano, alto sax
- Andrew Findon, alto flute, flute, piccolo, baritone sax
- David Lee, horn
- Nigel Gomm, trumpet
- Nigel Barr, bass trombone, euphonium
- Martin Elliott, bass guitar
- Chris Laurence, double bass
- Michael Nyman, piano, conductor
- Composed and conducted by Michael Nyman
- Orchestrated by Gary Carpenter
- Music consultant: Eduard Dubois
- Orchestral contractor: Isobel Griffiths
- Engineer: Austin Ince
- Assistant engineers: Paul Richardson, Tom Hanan
- Mastered by Bob Whitney
- Mixed by Austin Ince, Michael Nyman, Snake Ranch, London, December 2002
- Mastered by Bob Whitney at Sony Music Studios, London, December 2002
- Executive producer: Elizabeth Lloyd
- Production coordinator: Sarah Morley
- Special thanks: Claude Duvivier, Matthew Freeman, Michael Connell, Emmanuelle Mérand
- Published by Chester Music Limited/Michael Nyman Limited 2002
- Photography: Martial Lorcet
- Michael Nyman photograph: James Mollison
