= 24 Hours of a Woman's Life =

1952 film by Victor Saville

- U.S. poster
- Directed by: Victor Saville
- Written by: Warren Chetham Strode
- Based on: novella Twenty-Four Hours in the Life of a Woman by Stefan Zweig
- Produced by: Ivan Foxwell
- Starring: Merle Oberon; Richard Todd; Leo Genn
- Cinematography: Christopher Challis
- Edited by: Richard Best
- Music by: Robert Gill; Philip Green
- Color process: Technicolor
- Production company: Associated British Picture Corporation
- Distributed by: Associated British-Pathé; Allied Artists (US)
- Release date: 10 September 1952 (London)
- Running time: 90 minutes
- Country: United Kingdom
- Language: English
- Box office: £95,702 (UK)

24 Hours of a Woman's Life (also known as Affair in Monte Carlo) is a 1952 British Technicolor romantic drama film directed by Victor Saville and starring Merle Oberon, Richard Todd and Leo Genn. It was written by Warren Chetham Strode based on the 1927 novella by Stefan Zweig. Produced by ABPC, it was shot at the company's Elstree Studios and on location in Monaco. The film's sets were designed by the art director Terence Verity.

== Plot ==
Monsieur Blanc, the middle-aged proprietor of a café in Antibes, is eagerly preparing for his wedding to Henriette. He is devastated, however, when Henriette runs away with a young man she apparently only met the day before. Robert Sterling, a writer and one of the café patrons, tells the other diners that he has seen the same thing before: someone falling in love with a complete stranger.

He was playing host to Linda, a young widow whom he knew well, and three other guests aboard his yacht anchored in Monte Carlo. When he persuades her to visit the casino one night, she became irresistibly attracted to an unstable young man who became suicidal after losing all his money at roulette. Sterling describes how they fell deeply in love, and how they then had to face difficult decisions about the future.

== Cast ==
- Merle Oberon as Linda
- Richard Todd as a young man
- Leo Genn as Robert Stirling
- Stephen Murray as L'Abbé Benoit
- Peter Reynolds as Peter
- Joan Dowling as Mrs. Barry
- June Clyde as Mrs. Roche
- Peter Illing as Monsieur Blanc
- Jacques B. Brunius as concierge, Pension Lisa
- Isabel Dean as Miss Johnson
- Peter Jones as Bill
- Yvonne Furneaux as Henriette
- Mara Lane as Alice Brown
- Robert Ayres as Frank Brown
- Cyril Smith as Harry
- Mark Baker as Mr. Rohe
- Moultrie Kelsall as Murdoch
- Trader Faulkner as Mr. Barry
- Jeanne Pali as Mme Blanc
- Rene Poirier as attendant, Hotel Royalo
- Marguerite D'Alvarez as Mme Benoit
- Virginia Bedard as lady in Cook's Office
- Gordon Bell as clerk in Cook's Office
- Jill Clifford as Estelle Hunter
- Peter Hobbes as David Hunter

== Production ==
Actor Peter Reynolds was under contract to Associated British at the time.

Richard Todd wrote in his memoirs that although he loved filming in Monte Carlo "I realised quite early on... that this current movie was not going to break any records; the story was twee and slow-moving, and charming and beautifully-set though it was, gorgeous backgrounds are not the only requisite for a successful box-office picture."

== Critical reception ==
The Monthly Film Bulletin wrote: "A solemn tearjerker dressed up with Riviera photography in Technicolor, a concerto, some portentous dialogue on the possibility of 'love at first sight'. The three stars perform with unusual woodenness, the direction is lifeless, the pace almost unbearably retarded."

The Spectator described it as "a film of such artificiality and bathos the very typewriter keys cling together to avoid describing it."

TV Guide called the film a "poor sudser, although the background of the romantic Riviera and its fabulous casino provides some exotic interest."

Variety called it "novelettish."
