= El Zorro pierde el pelo =

- Directed by: Mario C. Lugones
- Written by: Carlos A. Petit
- Produced by: Carmelo Vecchione
- Starring: Pepe Iglesias, Fidel Pintos, María Esther Gamas
- Cinematography: Alberto Etchebehere
- Edited by: José Serra, Enrique Vico Carré
- Music by: Anatole Pietri
- Distributed by: Argentina Sono Film S.A.C.I.
- Release date: 16 November 1950
- Running time: 1 hr 17 min (77 min)
- Country: Argentina
- Language: Spanish

El Zorro pierde el pelo is a 1950 Argentine film of the classical era of Argentine cinema, directed by Mario C. Lugones on the screenplay of Carlos A. Petit, which premiered on 16 of November 1950 and starred Pepe Iglesias, Fidel Pintos, Mary Esther Ranges, Patricia Castell, Homero Cárpena and Nathan Pinzon. He also collaborated in the frame Enrique Vico Carré.

== Synopsis ==
The bride and future father of a womanizer try to teach her a lesson.

== Cast ==
- Pepe Iglesias - Pedro Medina
- Fidel Pintos - Enrique
- María Esther Gamas - Vicky
- Patricia Castell - Liliana
- Homero Cárpena - Cayetano Orloff
- Nathán Pinzón - Loco asesino
- Pedro Pompilio - Medina padre
- Ángel Prío - Hombre en casa de empeño
- Germán Vega - Canuto
- Nelly Panizza - Maquilladora
- Celia Geraldy - Enfermera
- Adolfo Linvel - Lázaro
- Alberto Quiles - Portero 1 Círculo social
- Nicolás Taricano - Portero 2 Círculo social
- Aída Villadeamigo - Secretaria del Sr. Medina
- Tessy Raines - Fabiola
- Olga Gatti - Bailarina
- Teresa Pintos - Bailarina
- Eduardo de Labar - Tántaro
- Fernando Campos
- Ermete Meliante
- Aurelio Molina
- Sara Santana
- Jaime Saslavsky
- Virginia de la Cruz
