= Aquiles Nazoa =

Venezuelan writer (1920–1976)

- Born: 17 May 1920; Caracas, Venezuela
- Died: 26 April 1976 (aged 55); Automobile accident between Caracas and Valencia

Signature
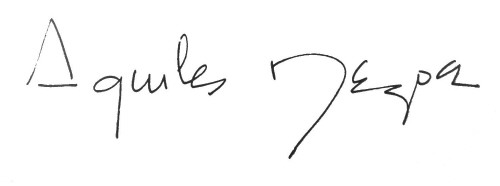

Aquiles Nazoa (Caracas, 17 May 1920 - 26 April 1976) was a Venezuelan writer, journalist, poet and humorist. His work expressed the values of popular Venezuelan culture.

== Career ==
He worked in the newspaper El Universal as a packer, later becoming a proof-reader. He had also begun to read English and French which allowed him to work simultaneously as a tourist guide in the Museo de Bellas Artes. He became the correspondent of El Universal in Puerto Cabello and was arrested in 1940 for defamation and slanderous allegations when criticising the Municipal authorities.

He worked in Tropical Radio, had a column in El Universal entitled Punta de lanza (spearhead), and was reporter for the newspaper Últimas Noticias. He collaborated in the weekly magazine El Morrocoy Azul and the newspaper El Nacional. He wrote for the Colombian magazine, Sábado (Saturday) and lived a year in Cuba. In 1945, he became editor of the magazine Fantoches. In 1956, he was expelled from the country by the regime of Marcos Pérez Jiménez, but returned in 1958.

In 1948, Nazoa obtained the Premio Nacional de Periodismo (National Journalism Prize) in the humour and customs section. He was also awarded the Premio Municipal de Literatura del Distrito Federal (Municipal Prize for Literature of the Federal District) in 1967.

== Death ==
He died in an automobile accident between Caracas and Valencia.

== Published works ==
- Caperucita criolla (Creole Little Red Riding-Hood), 1955
- Poesía para colorear (Poetry for colouring), 1958
- El burro flautista (The flautist donkey), 1958
- Los dibujos de Leo (Leo's drawings), 1959
- Caballo de manteca (Butter Horse), 1960
- Los poemas (The Poems), 1961
- Cuba de Martí a Fidel Castro (Cuba from Martí to Fidel Castro), 1961
- Mientras el palo va y viene (While the pole comes and goes), 1962
- Poesías costumbristas, humorísticas y festivas (Poems of customs, humourist and festival), 1963
- Pan y circo (Bread and Circus), 1965
- Los humoristas de Caracas (The humorists of Caracas), 1966
- Caracas física y espiritual (Caracas - physical and spiritual), 1967
- Historia de la música contada por un oyente (History of music as told by a listener), 1968
- Humor y amor de Aquiles Nazoa (The humour and love of Aquiles Nazoa), 1969
- Retrato hablado de matapalo (Spoken portrait of Ficus sp.),1970
- Venezuela suya (His Venezuela), 1971
- Los sin cuenta usos de la electricidad (The countless uses of electricity), 1973
- Gusto y regusto de la cocina venezolana (Taste and aftertaste of Venezuelan cookery), 1973
- Vida privada de las muñecas de trapo (Private life of the rag dolls), 1975
- Raúl Santana con un pueblo en el bolsillo (Raúl Santana with a town in his pocket), 1976
- Genial e Ingenioso: La obra literaria y gráfica del gran artista caraqueño Leoncio Martínez (Brilliant and Ingenious: The literary and graphical work of the great Caracas artist Leoncio Martinez), 1976
- Aquiles y la Navidad (Aquiles and Christmas), 1976

=== Notes ===
1. Aquiles is the Spanish name of the Greek hero Achilles.
2. Museo de Bellas Artes is the Museum of Fine Arts.
3. Morrocoy is a common Venezuelan species of tortoise. Azul is blue.
4. Fantoches are buffoons or puppets.
5. Mientras el palo va y viene seems figuratively to refer to his time in exile. "While the club swings, the ribs recover".

== Trivia ==
- In 2005 Ildemaro Torres made a biographical book about the life of Aquiles Nazoa, for the Biblioteca Biográfica Venezolana, with the seal of El Nacional.

== See also ==
- Aquiles Nazoa Cinema
