= La pequeña señora de Pérez =

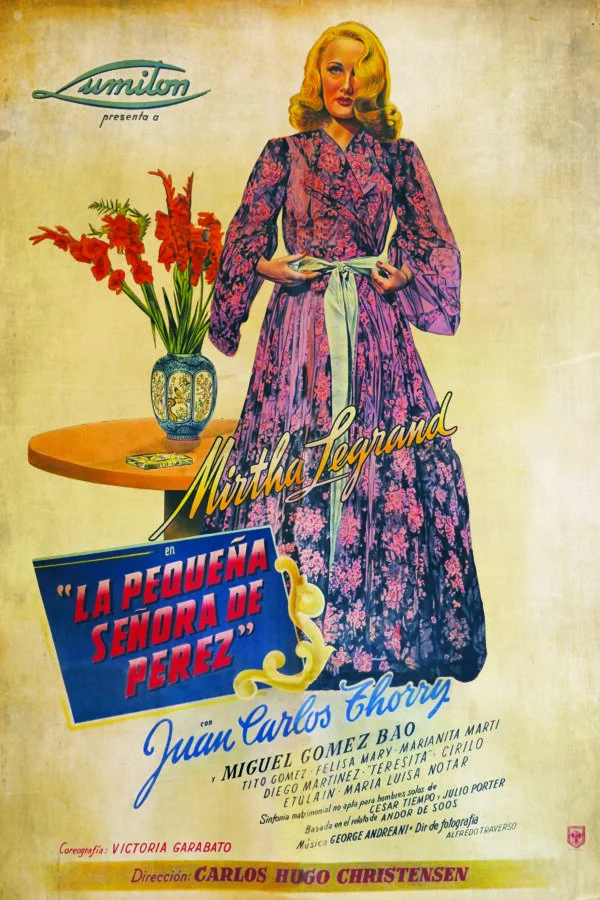
- Theatrical release poster
- Directed by: Carlos Hugo Christensen
- Screenplay by: César Tiempo; Julio Porter
- Based on: Back to School by Andor de Soos
- Starring: Mirtha Legrand; Juan Carlos Thorry
- Cinematography: Alfredo Traverso
- Edited by: Antonio Rampoldi
- Music by: George Andreani
- Production company: Lumiton
- Release date: January 28, 1944 (Buenos Aires)
- Running time: 90 minutes
- Country: Argentina
- Language: Spanish

La pequeña señora de Pérez (Spanish for "Little Mrs. Pérez") is a 1944 Argentine comedy film of the classical era of Argentine cinema, directed by Carlos Hugo Christensen and starring Mirtha Legrand and Juan Carlos Thorry. It tells the story of Julieta Ayala, a 17-year-old girl who drops out of high school to marry young doctor Carlos Pérez, only to soon re-enroll undercover after finding married life boring.

At the 1945 Argentine Film Critics Association Awards, Legrand won the Silver Condor Award for Best Actress for her performance in the film.

A sequel, titled La señora de Pérez se divorcia, was released in 1945.

== Plot ==
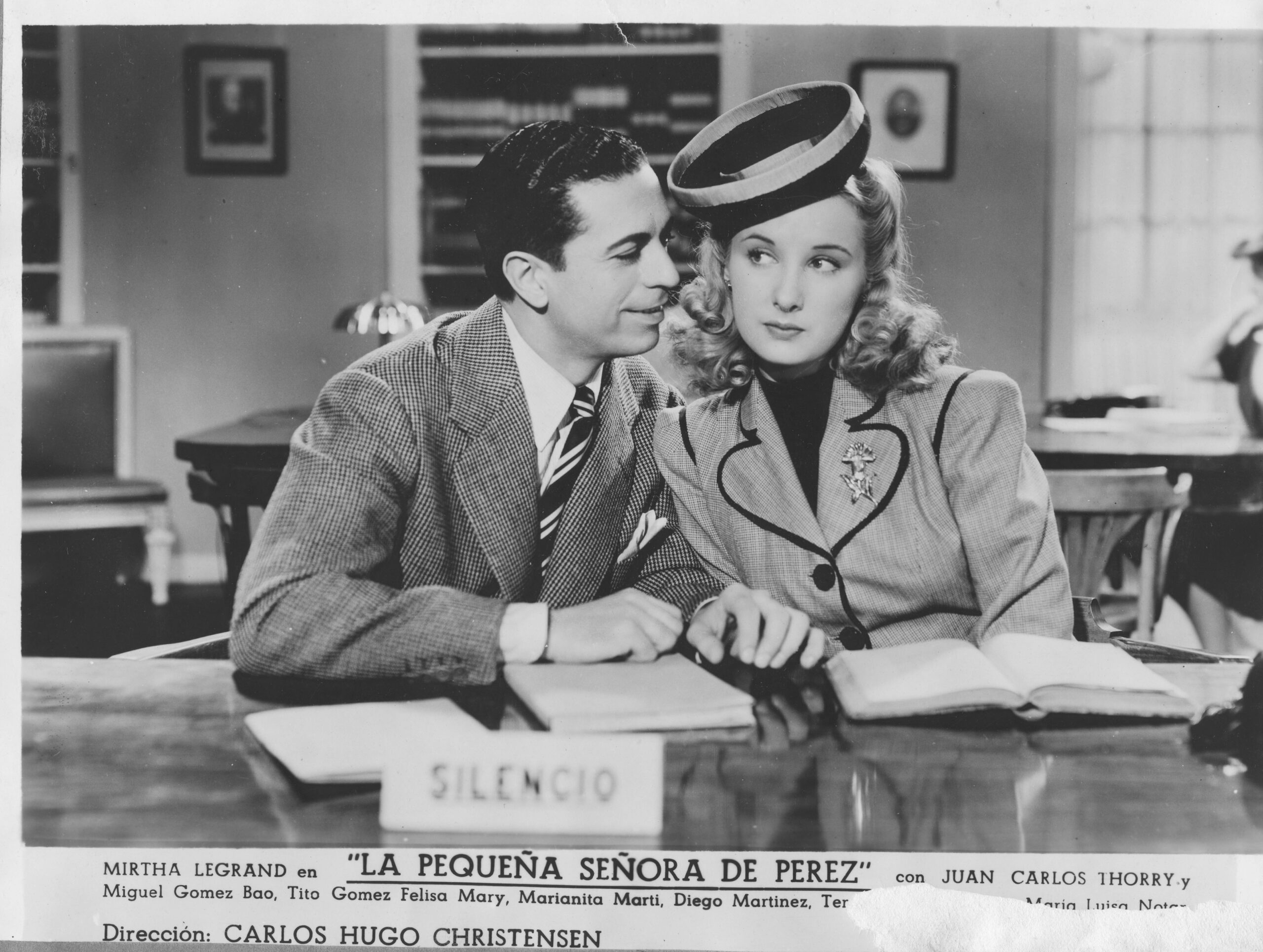
Lobby card featuring Dr. Carlos Pérez (Juan Carlos Thorry) courting high school student Juliana Ayala (Mirtha Legrand) at the library.

17-year-old student Juliana Ayala pretends to be sick to miss school and is visited by young doctor Carlos Pérez, and soon a romantic interest develops between them. After a brief courtship, the couple marries and Julieta drops out of school to pursue life as a housewife. However, her insertion into the role of a married adult woman soon turns out to be monotonous and boring, consisting of trivial activities such as going to the hairdresser's or playing bridge.

Missing her life at school, Julieta decides to secretly enroll again, posing as an orphan that lives with her guardian Dr. Pérez. The girl alternates between her social obligations as a married woman and her studies, which eventually leads her to fail in both areas. On the one hand, she constantly fails her exams because she does not have time to study, while the life she hides from her husband ends up causing suspicions and misunderstandings with him.

When confronted by her teacher about her poor performance, Julieta lies, saying that she is forced to do all the chores at home, which makes him feel sorry for her and offer her a private teacher paid by him so that she can prepare for the next exam. The girl contacts the young professor who was recommended to her and they both meet at the Parque Tres de Febrero in Palermo, where he is enchanted by the girl's beauty.

Upon returning home from Palermo, Julieta is confronted by her husband, who has just called the girl's hairdresser and dressmaker and discovered that she has been lying about her activities outside the home. Julieta quickly replies that she had actually gone to visit her parents, but at that moment they come to visit and reveal that she was lying again. In tears, Julieta confesses that she had been in Palermo, but she does not get to say what she was doing because someone knocks on the door again. Carlos leaves the discussion for a moment to open the door and receives Julieta's private teacher, who was looking to talk to him—believing that he was her tutor—to ask for her hand. This worsens Carlos's suspicions, who angrily expels the young man and upon returning to the living room discovers that Julieta had left with her family.

Julieta and Carlos spend two weeks apart, given the reluctance of the young woman to confess what she was doing in Palermo with the other man. One day before the exam that Julieta has been preparing for, Carlos is visited by her school teacher and by the private teacher, who explain the confusion. Julieta arrives at the anatomy exam and discovers that Carlos is the one who is evaluating. When he asks her about the heart, Julieta gives a sentimental answer about love and is immediately approved.

== Cast ==
- Mirtha Legrand as Julieta Ayala
- Juan Carlos Thorry as Dr. Carlos Pérez
- Miguel Gómez Bao as César, Julieta's father
- Felisa Mary as Carolina, Julieta's mother
- Tito Gómez as Professor Jacinto Mauri
- Marianita Martí as Sabina Perales, Julieta's school friend
- Diego Martínez as Professor Lagos
- Cirilo Etulain as Professor Solís
- María Luisa Notar as Olvido, the maid of the Ayala

== Reception ==
Writing for El Mundo, Calki described the film as "well done and of agile development... within its superficiality, an uncommon comic efficiency stands out."
