= Eduardo Serrano (musician) =

Venezuelan musician (1911–2008)

Background information
- Born: February 14, 1911; Caracas, Venezuela
- Died: October 13, 2008 (aged 97); Caracas, Venezuela
- Genres: Venezuelan popular music, merengue, waltzes, aguinaldos, pasodobles
- Occupation(s): musician, conductor, composer

Eduardo Valentín Serrano Torres (Caracas, February 14, 1911 – Caracas, October 13, 2008), was a Venezuelan popular musician, conductor and composer. He composed many important Venezuelan merengue; one of his most important works was the song "Barlovento". He won the National Music Prize in 1988. He died on October 13, 2008, at the age of 97.
