= List of Argentine films of 1960 =

A list of films produced in Argentina in 1960:

Argentine films of 1960
Title	Director	Release	Genre
A - D
Los acusados	Antonio Cunill	10 March	
Álamos talados	Catrano Catrani	5 May	
El Asalto	Kurt Land	5 May	
El bote, el río y la gente	Enrique Cahen Salaberry	1 June	
El campeón soy yo	Virgilio Muguerza	18 February	
Chafalonías	Mario Soffici	17 November	
El Crack	José A. Martínez Suárez	16 August	
Creo en tí	Alfonso Corona Blake	2 June	
Culpable	Hugo del Carril	2 June	
De los Apeninos a los Andes	Folco Quilici	3 March	
Dos tipos con suerte	Miguel Morayta Martínez	24 March	
E - P
Fin de fiesta	Leopoldo Torre Nilsson	23 June	
Las furias	Vlasta Lah	3 November	
El fogón de los gauchos	Julio Irigoyen	6 September	
Hombres salvajes	Richard von Schenck and Albert Arliss	31 March	
India	Armando Bó	21 January	
Los de la mesa 10	Simón Feldman	18 October	
Luna Park	Rubén W. Cavallotti	17 June	
La madrastra	Rodolfo Blasco	15 September	
Obras maestras del terror	Enrique Carreras	28 July	
La patota	Daniel Tinayre	11 August	
Plaza Huincul (Pozo Uno)	Lucas Demare	1 September	
La potranca	Román Viñoly Barreto	8 September	
La Procesión	Francis Lauric	14 July	
Q - Z
Río abajo	Enrique Dawi	28 July	
Sábado a la noche, cine	Fernando Ayala	29 September	
Shunko	Lautaro Murúa	17 November	
Tierra de nuestros mayores	Manuel Aris	21 July	
Todo el año es Navidad	Román Viñoly Barreto	25 February	
Un guapo del 900	Leopoldo Torre Nilsson	17 August	
Un tipo de sangre	León Klimovsky	19 June	
...Y el demonio creó a los hombres	Armando Bó	10 November	
Yo quiero vivir contigo	Carlos Rinaldi	25 May	

== External links and references ==
- Argentine films of 1960 at the Internet Movie Database
