= List of Argentine films of 1956 =

A list of films produced in Argentina in 1956:

Argentine films of 1956
Title	Director	Release	Genre
A - D
África ríe	Carlos Rinaldi	26 January	
Alejandra	Carlos Schlieper	19 April	
Amor a primera vista	Leo Fleider	15 March	
Bendita seas	Luis Mottura	8 March	
Catita es una dama	Julio Saraceni	7 June	
Cubitos de hielo	Juan Sires	20 September	
La dama del millón	Enrique Cahen Salaberry	26 April	
De noche también se duerme	Enrique Carreras	19 January	
Después del silencio	Lucas Demare	13 September	
E - L
Edad difícil	Leopoldo Torres Ríos	27 July	
Enigma de mujer	Enrique Cahen Salaberry	27 September	
Estrellas de Buenos Aires	Kurt Land	19 July	
Graciela	Leopoldo Torre Nilsson	10 May	
Historia de una soga	Enrique De Thomas	28 June	
El hombre virgen	Román Viñoly Barreto	7 March	
Horizontes de piedra	Román Viñoly Barreto	3 May	
M - P
Los maridos de mamá	Edgardo Togni	5 April	
Marta Ferrari	Julio Saraceni	17 August	
Más allá del olvido	Hugo del Carril	14 June	
La muerte flota en el río	Augusto César Vatteone	1 November	
Música, alegría y amor	Enrique Carreras	9 May	
Novia para dos	Leo Fleider	23 August	
Oro bajo	Mario Soffici	2 August	
Pecadora	Enrique Carreras	23 February	
La pícara soñadora	Ernesto Arancibia	24 May	
Prohibido para menores	Ignacio Tankel	14 November	
El protegido	Leopoldo Torre Nilsson	22 November	
S - Z
Sangre y acero	Lucas Demare	1 March	
El satélite chiflado	Julio Saraceni	5 July	
El sonámbulo que quería dormir	Juan Sires	8 May	
Suceso deportivo		5 July	
Surcos en el mar	Kurt Land	9 August	
Los tallos amargos	Fernando Ayala	21 June	
El tango en París	Arturo S. Mom	9 August	
Los torturados	Alberto Du Bois	18 October	
El último perro	Lucas Demare	14 March	
Una mujer diferente	Yago Blass	31 May	

== External links and references ==
- Argentine films of 1956 at the Internet Movie Database
