= Secret Ceremony (novel) =

Novel by Marco Denevi

Ceremonia secreta
- Author: Marco Denevi
- Language: Spanish
- Genre: Gothic novel
- Publisher: Ediciones Corregidor
- Publication date: 1960
- Publication place: Argentina

Ceremonia secreta (English: Secret Ceremony) is a gothic novel by Argentine writer Marco Denevi. The work, successor to the acclaimed Rosaura a las diez, was first published in 1960 in a volume titled Ceremonia Secreta y Otros Cuentos de América Latina Premiados en el Concurso Literario de Life en español edited by Doubleday, which contained the stories (the long story or novella in Denevi's case) of the three prize-winners and eight honorable mentions, including one — Jacob y el otro — by the by-then established Juan Carlos Onetti and another by the then little-known Haroldo Conti.

The first separate edition of the novel was published by Ediciones Corregidor in 1960, an authorized reproduction by Life en español.

== Plot ==
Ceremonia secreta tells the mysterious relationship between Leonides Arrufat, a 58-year-old solitary spinster, and Cecilia Engelhard, a young orphan who mistakes her for her mother.

Leonides carries out a daily ritual in which early each morning she walks past several houses in the town, leaving offerings made up of different kinds of flowers and praying in front of the doors of those who awaken her compassion. When the person deserves what she sees as divine punishment, Leonides does not leave a flower but a nettle branch, until she reaches her final destination, the cemetery of La Chacarita Cemetery, where she visits her parents and siblings, who died simultaneously in circumstances that are not detailed.

Leonides and Cecilia meet on the tram, when Cecilia fixes her gaze on Leonides and decides to follow her. Leonides, guided by a blend of curiosity and pity, allows herself to be taken and accompanies the young woman to her home, a gloomy mansion with a room full of portraits of a woman who is no longer there but who will mysteriously be revived. There Leonides discovers why the girl follows and treats her with such affection: she mistakes her for her deceased mother, Guirlanda Santos, to whom Leonides bears a remarkable resemblance.

In a dark, suffocating atmosphere inside Cecilia's decaying mansion — a typical setting of the gothic novel — Leonides becomes alienated to the point of madness, truly believing herself to be the girl's mother. Soon after, two strangers burst into their lives and unsettle the self-imposed fiction of the two lonely women. By abruptly entering their world, these characters, Mercedes and Encarnación, disrupt that universe. From the discovery of a series of letters, Cecilia's mysterious departure from the house, and the appearance of the two friends of the deceased woman, Leonides begins an inquiry to decipher the truth behind the mystery. Is Cecilia a poor, disturbed young woman who believes she sees in Leonides the living image of her mother? Or is she a lost, perfidious woman like those Leonides despises and punishes — an impostor with unclear intentions?

The novel shifts slightly by interweaving several tropes of the detective genre into the general gothic style. Leonides becomes a sort of investigator who follows clues and reconstructs events.

To discover the truth Leonides must leave the house and confront Mercedes and Encarnación. For this she adopts a new identity: Anabelí Santos, the supposed cousin of Guirlanda.

By questioning Mercedes and Encarnación she uncovers that the traumatic episode that drove Cecilia mad was not the death of her mother but another. Her cousin Belena, who had moved in with her after Guirlanda's death, arranged to have her killed to keep the inheritance. However, the young men she hired did not carry out the murder: instead they stole everything in the house and raped the girl. Cecilia became pregnant and went insane.

All these facts are finally revealed by Cecilia herself, who, as if awakening from a long stupor, regains lucidity shortly before dying. Moved, Leonides decides that fate placed her in that position and that she has a role to play in that "secret ceremony". She thus chooses to take revenge and kills Belena, after which she recovers her original identity.

== Characters ==
- Leonides Arrufat: The story's protagonist. A 58-year-old spinster: grey, solitary and gloomy, dressed in mourning, deeply religious and superstitious, with conservative ideas and values. She harbors repulsion toward humanity reflected in her aversions to Natividad González, youth, love and sex. Leonides adopts different personas that place her first in the role of Cecilia's mother and later, toward the end of the narrative, in that of the supposed cousin of Guirlanda.
- Cecilia Engelhard: A 23-year-old young woman, not very attractive, plump, short in stature with abundant blonde hair. Shy, submissive, affectionate and fearful, she has inherited a fortune after the death of her parents and lives alone in a large house. She displays childish attitudes and is deeply affected by a traumatic episode she suffered.
- Encarnación and Mercedes: Supposed friends of Cecilia's mother. They are sisters living with their mother and try to profit from Cecilia's situation by stealing items from the mansion while being watched by Leonides.
- Guirlanda Santos: Cecilia's mother, who died of cancer.
- Belena: Cecilia's cousin, aged 42. She moved into Cecilia's house after Guirlanda's death under the pretext of caring for her but is the one who devises the plan to have her killed and keep the inheritance.
- Jan Engelhard: Cecilia's father, deceased, from whom she inherits the fortune. Of Danish origin, he was an Rosicrucian devoted to esotericism and the occult sciences.
- Natividad González: Leonides’ neighbor, whom Leonides despises as indecent and against whom she attempts to act by leaving a nettle branch at her door. Natividad has an altercation with Leonides near the beginning of the narrative.

== Analysis ==
In his edition of this and other works by Denevi, Donald A. Yates notes Denevi's admiration for Wilkie Collins, whose work this novel resembles.

Cristina Piña interprets the novel as an inverted fairy tale: "this modern and ironic fairy tale reworks the traditional hero's initiatory path in his confrontation with sexuality, except that instead of resolving it in a reconciliation with it by establishing a personal relationship that includes it — the prince and princess's wedding — it expels sexuality definitively from the protagonists' universe, replacing it with the 'white' relationship of a spiritual motherhood that finds its affirmation in the crime that closes the text and the solitude that follows it."

Fernando Alegría observed that "there is something, or much, of magic in his literary production: magic to see the world and people, not in the dimensions we all know, but beneath them, where every boundary disappears and real objects acquire human presence, while men split and begin to act as enemies of themselves." He adds something applicable to Ceremonia secreta: "It is difficult, perhaps impossible, to predict what Denevi's characters will do. Perhaps the author does not even know when he begins to write his story and becomes excited by the surprises to come."

== Awards ==
Ceremonia secreta received first prize, endowed with US$50,000, in a short story contest held by the magazine Life en español, where it was first published. The jury included: Octavio Paz, Hernán Díaz Arrieta, Arturo Uslar Pietri, Emir Rodríguez Monegal and Federico de Onís.

== Adaptations ==
- The story was adapted for television in Argentina by Narciso Ibáñez Menta as a three-episode miniseries. The script was written by his son, Chicho Ibáñez Serrador. It was directed by Edgardo Borda and starred Milagros de la Vega and Estela Molly as Leonides and Cecilia, respectively. The scenes set in Cecilia's house were filmed in the mansion at 78 Suipacha Street, allowing Denevi to finally see the interior of the mysterious house that had inspired him. "It turned out to be more beautiful than I had imagined," he would say.
- It was filmed as Secret Ceremony in 1968, starring Elizabeth Taylor, Mia Farrow, Robert Mitchum and Peggy Ashcroft. The film was directed by Joseph Losey with a screenplay by George Tabori. It had previously been filmed for Argentine television when it was purchased in 1963 by Dore Schary.
- The novel was an episode in 1981 of El mundo del espectáculo, broadcast by Canal 13 and directed by Rodolfo Hoppe. The cast included Susana Campos, María Danelli and Nelly Prono.
- Ceremonia secreta was also an episode broadcast in 1997 of the television series Los especiales de Doria, transmitted by Telefe. It was directed by Alejandro Doria with a cast including Belén Blanco, Irma Córdoba, Rita Cortese, Daniela Pal, Marta Lubos and Germán Palacios.
- The novel was staged in 2011 by director Óscar Barney Finn (Oscar Barney Finn). The production featured Estela Medina (Leonides), Soledad Fandiño (Cecilia), Ana María Casó (Mercedes), Javier Díaz Santacruz, Julián Felcman, Pablo Fernández, Nicolás Fiore, Susana Lanteri (Encarnación) and Florencia Limonoff. Performances took place at the Teatro Margarita Xirgu in San Telmo.

== Bibliography ==
- Marco Denevi, Ceremonia secreta, Ediciones Corregidor, Buenos Aires, 1973, illustrated by Elbio Fernández, prologue by Fernando Alegría, 135 pages.
