= Rosaura at 10 O'Clock =

- Theatrical release poster
- Directed by: Mario Soffici
- Written by: Jacoba Tracero
- Based on: Rosa at Ten O'Clock by Marco Denevi
- Produced by: Carmelo Vecchione
- Starring: Juan Verdaguer
- Narrated by: Merche Platono
- Cinematography: Aníbal González Paz
- Distributed by: Argentina Sono Film S.A.C.I
- Release date: 6 March 1958
- Running time: 100 minutes
- Country: Argentina
- Language: Spanish

Rosaura at 10 O'Clock (Spanish: Rosaura a las diez) is a 1958 Argentine crime drama mystery film directed by Mario Soffici and starring Juan Verdaguer and Susana Campos. It was entered into the 1958 Cannes Film Festival. It is based on a 1955 novel of the same name written by Marco Denevi.

It was selected as the fourth greatest Argentine film of all time in a poll conducted by the Museo del Cine Pablo Ducrós Hicken in 2000. In a new version of the survey organized in 2022 by the specialized magazines La vida util, Taipei and La tierra quema, presented at the Mar del Plata International Film Festival, the film reached the 21 position.

== Plot ==
The story begins at La Madrileña, a boardinghouse in Buenos Aires. The owner, Mrs. Milagros, lives there with her three daughters along with Camilo Canegato, a shy, short-statured, middle-aged, painter and portrait restorer; David Réguel, a law school student; and several others.

After residing at the house for 12 years, Camilo begins to receive perfumed, love letters from a woman named Rosaura with the 10pm mail. Also, he has a painting of the young and beautiful Rosaura hidden in his room. Mrs. Milagros and her daughters read the passionate letters without Camilo's knowledge and later discover the painting. They are astonished that such a young beauty could fall in love with the shy painter. They also learn of Rosaura's life with her aunt and wealthy, domineering father who is forcing her to marry a man she doesn't love.

One evening, Rosaura unexpectedly arrives at the house asking for Camilo. Mrs. Milagros immediately recognizes her from the painting and enthusiastically welcomes her. Camilo, however, is shocked beyond words to see her and treats her coldly. Mrs. Milagros invites her to live in the house free of charge but David suspects something ugly between Camilo and Rosaura after getting to know her. Despite this, Rosaura stays and she and Camilo soon marry.

Tragedy strikes when Rosaura is found dead in the hotel room where she and Camilo spend their first night as a married couple. David, who followed the couple in a cab, discovers Rosaura's body and races back to the house to announce that Camilo has killed her. The police investigate by questioning the boarders and by reading an unmailed letter written by Rosaura to her aunt.

They discover Rosaura's name was really Maria, a young woman Camilo met several years ago who was the niece of his laundry lady. Maria's aunt gave a picture of her to Camilo and he quickly became enamored. Seeing this, Maria's aunt encouraged her to offer Camilo sex for money which he readily agreed to. The final time Camilo sought Maria for her services her aunt said she had died but in reality she had been sentenced to prison for an unspecified crime.

After five years in jail, Maria appeared at the door of an old girlfriend's apartment and asked to live with her. She agreed but soon discovered her friend was part of a prostitution ring and was working for a man named the Turk. Later, two pimps who worked for the Turk tried to force Maria into prostitution. She refused and received a beating from one of them because of it. The group tried to hold her prisoner in the apartment but Maria escaped the next morning by picking the lock to the apartment's door. She then went to La Madrileña looking for Camilo, not out of love, but to ask him for money so she could travel back to her province to be with her aunt.

After questioning Camilo, police discover the love letters were written by Camilo himself to impress Matilde, the adult daughter of Mrs. Milagros, for whom he had romantic feelings. Also, Camilo's photo of Maria served as the model for the painting of the fictional Rosaura. Maria's arrival at the boarding house and the love letters were mere coincidence.

Camilo also says, on their wedding night Maria taunted him and reminded him that he will have to pay her alimony if he divorces her. Enraged, Camilo began to strangle her but couldn't bring himself to kill her. He then ran out of the hotel and into the street in a daze to find David waiting outside. David had followed the couple out of fear for Maria's safety.

Coincidentally, the hotel that Camilo and Maria checked into was owned by the Turk, whom Maria had never met, and it was the Turk who checked them in.

The police conclude the Turk and/or his pimps killed Maria. With the investigation complete, the police arrest the Turk, the pimps and Maria's friend. Camilo is then cleared of suspicion.

== Cast ==
- Juan Verdaguer as Camilo Canegato
- Susana Campos as Rosaura / Marta Córrega / María Correa
- María Luisa Robledo as Doña Milagros Ramoneda - viuda de Perales
- Alberto Dalbés as David Réguel
- Amalia Bernabé as Srta. Eufrasia Morales
- Héctor Calcaño
- María Concepción César as Matilde
- Nina Brian
- Lili Gacel
- Beto Gianola
- Miguel Ligero
- Enrique Kossi
