= Donald A. Yates =

Writer, Translator, and Editor

- Born: April 11, 1930 Ayer, Massachusetts, United States
- Died: October 17, 2017 (aged 87) California, United States
- Occupation: Writer, Translator, Editor
- Genre: Fiction

Donald A. Yates (April 30, 1930 – October 17, 2017) was an American professor, writer, translator, and editor. His edition of Jorge Luis Borges' Labyrinths (New Directions, 1962) was crucial to the worldwide dissemination of Borges' work.

== Biography ==
Donald A. Yates was born in Ayer, Massachusetts, in 1930. He began studying Spanish in 1945 at Pioneer High School (Ann Arbor, Michigan). After serving two years in the Army, he entered Michigan State University, where he graduated with a master's degree in Spanish in 1954 and a doctorate in 1961. He wrote his doctoral dissertation, "The Argentine Detective Story", under the guidance of Enrique Anderson Imbert. At that time he became acquainted with the work of Borges, and after getting in touch with him and receiving his approval, he began to translate some of the stories included in El Aleph (transl. The Aleph) and Ficciones (transl. Fictions). Together with another graduate student at Michigan State University named James Irby, he worked on a book manuscript that was rejected several times. Finally, in 1962, it was accepted and published by New Directions as Labyrinths: Selected Stories & Other Writings by Jorge Luis Borges. This was the first collection of Borges' short stories and essays published in English. After the release of Labyrinths, Yates traveled to Argentina, where he met and became friends with Borges. The Fulbright Program sponsored that trip and most of the ones that followed. He was a Fulbright Scholar and Fulbright Lecturer in Latin American Literature (Argentina) in 1964–65; 1967–68; 1970–71, and 1974–75. He taught in Spanish and English at the University of Buenos Aires, John F. Kennedy University, and La Plata National University, and lectured in Argentina, Peru, Chile, and Uruguay. At the same time, he was a professor in Michigan State University's Spanish department. He translated novels and short stories by other Argentine authors, including Marco Denevi, Manuel Peyrou, Rodolfo Walsh (with whom he co-founded the short-lived New World Literary Agency in the 1950s), Enrique Anderson Imbert, and Adolfo Bioy Casares.

As general editor of the Macmillan Modern Spanish American Literature series, he published numerous anthologies of Spanish American authors.

He was president of the International Institute of Latin American Literature from 1971 to 1973.

From 1972 until 1976, while he was the head of Michigan State University's Spanish department, he regularly invited Borges to give classes at the institution.

In 1982, he retired from the university and settled with his wife, Joanne, in Napa Valley, California, where he lived until his death. He continued with his work as a translator, critic, and author. He published his own writings and reviews of literature and films in newspapers and magazines such as The New Yorker, The New York Times Book Review, The Washington Post, San Francisco Chronicle and The Atlantic. He began to gather material for a future biography of Borges and wrote memoirs about his friendship with the American writer Cornell Woolrich, whom he had met in New York in 1961 and visited year after year at his Manhattan residence. These memoirs were published, under the title "The Last Days of Cornell Woolrich", in the book The Big Book of Noir (Carroll & Graf Publishers, 1998).

In 2000 The National Endowment for the Arts awarded him a grant to translate into English the entire prose work of Argentine writer Edgar Brau, from whom he had previously translated a short story, The Siesta, published in Ellery Queen Mystery Magazine. A book with a selection of these translations was published in 2007 under the title Casablanca and Other Stories (MSU Press). This book was one of four finalists for the 2007 PEN Club Award in the translation category.

He made his last trip to Argentina in November 2008. The Buenos Aires City Government declared him "Guest of Honor," and the Academia Argentina de Letras (Argentine Academy of Letters) awarded him a distinction for his work in the translation and dissemination of Argentine literature. That same year, The Society of Authors (London) selected Labyrinths as one of the fifty most outstanding translations in the last fifty years, and the John Simon Guggenheim Memorial Foundation awarded him a grant to complete his biography of Borges.

Donald Yates died in October 2017 at his Napa Valley home due to aplastic anemia. A year later, fulfilling her husband's wishes, his widow gave to Michigan State University the entire collection of manuscripts, correspondence, and photos he had assembled of Borges and other writers from Argentina. In 2020, his home was destroyed by the Glass Fire that struck the Napa Valley area.

== Selected publications ==
=== Textbooks ===
- Imaginación y fantasía (Holt, Rinehart & Winston, 1960. Sixth edition, 1999).
- Rosaura a las diez (Scribners, 1964).
- Ceremonia secreta y otros cuentos (Macmillan, 1964).
- Tres cuentistas hispanoamericanos (Macmillan, 1969).
- Cuentos de la metrópoli: quince narraciones porteñas (Appleton-Century-Crofts, 1971).
- Espejos: doce relatos hispanoamericanos de nuestro tiempo (Holt, Rinehart & Wiston, 1980).

=== Editor ===
- Antología del cuento policial hispanoamericano (México, Andrea, 1964).

=== Translator and Editor ===
- Labyrinths: Selected Stories & Other Writings by Jorge Luis Borges (New Directions, 1962)
- Latin Blood: The Best Crime Stories of Latin America (Herder & Herder, 1972).
- Everything and Nothing (New Directions, 1999) by Jorge Luis Borges.

=== Translator (Books) ===
- Rosa at Ten O'Clock by Marco Denevi (Holt, Rinehart & Winston, 1964).
- Thunder of the Roses by Manuel Peyrou (Herder & Herder, 1972).
- Diary of the War of the Pig by Adolfo Bioy Casares (Herder & Herder, 1972).
- Casablanca and Other Stories by Edgar Brau (MSU Press, 2007). It is includes three books: Tres cuentos (Metzengerstein, 1998), Dos historias fantásticas (Metzengerstein, 1998), El Viaje (Metzengerstein, 1998).
- Argentine Suite (Four stories about the last Argentine military dictatorship, the Dirty War) by Edgar Brau
