= Pedro Buchardo =

Argentine actor

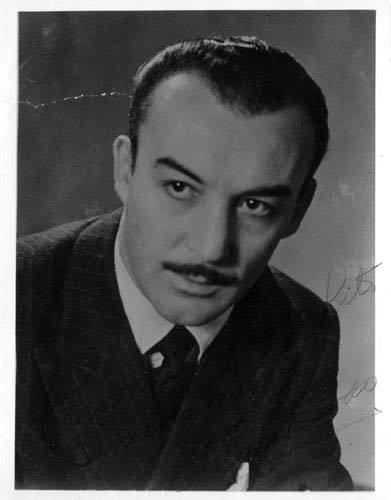
Pedro Buchardo

Pedro Buchardo (Spanish pronunciation: [ˈpeðɾo βuˈtʃaɾðo]; 1916–1971) was an Argentine actor. He was born in Carmen, Santa Fe.

== Filmography ==
- Un guapo del 900 (1971)
- Los Mochileros (1970)
- Gitano (1970)
- Amalio Reyes, un hombre (1970)
- El Señor Presidente (no estrenada comercialmente – 1969)
- Los contrabandistas (mediometraje – 1967)
- La Cosecha (1966)
- Gente conmigo (1965)
- Asalto a la ciudad (1961)
- Los de la mesa 10 (1960)
- Luna Park (1960)
- El bote, el río y la gente (1960)
- Procesado 1040 (1958)
- Captura recomendada (1950)
- Edición extra (1949)
- El muerto falta a la cita (1944)

== Sources ==
- "Pedro Buchardo". Cine Nacional (in Spanish). Archived from the original on 2007-11-19.
