= Culpable (film) =

1960 film

- Directed by: Hugo del Carril
- Written by: Eduardo Borrás
- Produced by: Hugo del Carril
- Starring: Mario Soffici; Silvia Legrand
- Cinematography: Américo Hoss
- Edited by: José Serra
- Music by: Tito Ribero
- Distributed by: Tecuara
- Release date: 1960
- Running time: 90 minutes
- Country: Argentina
- Language: Spanish

Culpable is a 1960 Argentine crime drama directed and starring Hugo del Carril. The film was based on a play by Eduardo Borrás. The film starred Mario Soffici and Silvia Legrand.

== Cast ==
- Hugo del Carril ... Leo Expósito
- Roberto Escalada
- Elina Colomer ... The Leo Expósito's wife
- Myriam de Urquijo
- María Aurelia Bisutti
- Ernesto Bianco ... The Conscience
- Luis Otero
- Diana Ingro
- Maria Esther Duckse
- Carlos Olivieri ... Raúl (as Carlitos Olivieri)
- Carlos R. Costa
- Mario Martín
- Yamandú Romero
- Mario Campodónico
