= La Quintrala (Argentine film) =

1955 Argentine historical drama film

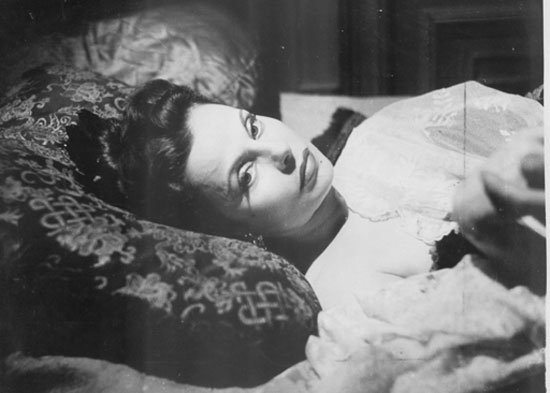
- Ana María Lynch as La Quintrala
- Directed by: Hugo del Carril
- Written by: Eduardo Borrás
- Produced by: Hugo del Carril
- Starring: Antonio Vilar; Ana María Lynch; Francisco de Paula; Milagros de la Vega
- Cinematography: Pablo Tabernero
- Edited by: Vicente Castagno
- Music by: Tito Ribero
- Release date: May 26, 1955 (Argentina)
- Running time: 99 minutes
- Country: Argentina
- Language: Spanish

La Quintrala (also known as La Quintrala, doña Catalina de los Ríos y Lisperguer) is a 1955 Argentine historical drama film directed and produced by Hugo del Carril and written by Eduardo Borrás. Set in 17th-century Chile, it stars Antonio Vilar as the priest Fray Pedro de Figueroa and Ana María Lynch as Catalina de los Ríos y Lisperguer, the historical figure known as La Quintrala. The film also stars Francisco de Paula and Milagros de la Vega. It was released in Argentina on 26 May 1955.

The film was an ambitious production that recreated colonial Chile and was photographed in black and white. It was presented internationally at the Venice Film Festival in 1954, before its Argentine commercial release the following year. It received the Silver Condor Award for Best Film, while Antonio Vilar received the Silver Condor for Best Actor.

== Plot ==
Set in 17th-century Chile, the film centers on Catalina de los Ríos y Lisperguer, a wealthy woman of the colonial aristocracy known as La Quintrala. She becomes involved with Enrique de Guzmán while pursuing a relationship with the priest Fray Pedro de Figueroa. The story combines romance, religious conflict, violence, and the legendary accounts surrounding Catalina's reputation.

== Cast ==
- Antonio Vilar as Fray Pedro de Figueroa
- Ana María Lynch as Catalina de los Ríos y Lisperguer, La Quintrala
- Francisco de Paula as Enrique de Guzmán
- Milagros de la Vega as Águeda
- Andrés Mejuto as Pedro Lisperguer
- Manuel Perales as Gonzalo de los Ríos
- Iván Grondona as Rodrigo de Castro
- Francisco López Silva as the Bishop
- Ricardo Mendoza as Ventura
- Antonio Martiánez as Father Javier
- José Comellas as Governor Osores
- María Esther Álvarez as Rosa
- Domingo Garibotto as a man in a cart
- Amalia Britos as a nun
- Oscar Guerrero as a voice-over
- Roberto Germán as a man in a tavern
- María Ferez as a woman in the plaza
- Pura Díaz as a woman in the plaza
- Félix Tortorelli
- Enrique San Miguel
- Roldán Cobos
- Roberto Croharé
- Yamandú Romero
- Héctor Dávila
- Hernaldo Hamze
- José María Rossi
- Pedro Lamarque
- Osvaldo Bruzzi
- Sara Arrieta
- Osvaldo Tempone
- Osvaldo Cala
- Aníbal Rodríguez
- Armando Moreno
- Ramón Marco
- Antonio Pascual
- Mario Díaz López
- Fernando Peliche
- Carlos Benso
- María Arrieta
- Harry Gainer
- Ricardo Larson
- Jaimito Cohen
- Félix Galimi
- Fulvio Galimi
- Juan Villarreal

Félix and Fulvio Galimi, prominent Argentine fencers, also appear in the film.

== Production ==
La Quintrala was directed and produced by Hugo del Carril from a screenplay by Eduardo Borrás. Pablo Tabernero served as cinematographer, Vicente Castagno as editor, Tito Ribero composed the music, and Gori Muñoz was responsible for the sets.

The production began in 1953 and was subject to a six-month suspension. The completed film was ready for exhibition in 1954 and was shown at the Venice Film Festival in August of that year, outside the competition, but its Argentine commercial release was repeatedly postponed. The delays have been associated with the increasingly strained relationship between the government of Juan Perón and the Catholic Church, as the film's treatment of religion was considered potentially controversial.

The film was noted for its elaborate historical reconstruction of colonial Chile for an Argentine production of the period.

== Release ==
Although the film had been completed in 1954, it was not released commercially in Argentina until 26 May 1955. Its theatrical run was short-lived. Following the September 1955 coup that overthrew Perón, the film was withdrawn from circulation, while Del Carril was among the artists associated with Peronism who faced official persecution.

== Restoration ==
The original negatives of La Quintrala were lost. The Asociación de Apoyo al Patrimonio Audiovisual (APROCINAIN) later recovered a partial internegative, which was completed using a positive print preserved by the INCAA. A new print was produced with support from Kodak and Cinecolor and was subsequently exhibited by the Museo de Arte Latinoamericano de Buenos Aires (MALBA).

The restored film was screened at MALBA in July and August 2002 as part of a program of newly restored classic films. Contemporary reports described APROCINAIN's work as involving the recovery of surviving film materials and the production of new 35 mm prints.

== Reception ==
Critical assessments of La Quintrala have varied considerably. Gustavo Cabrera, in his biography of Hugo del Carril, described the film as an unusual work in Argentine cinema and praised its elaborate craftsmanship, oppressive atmosphere, and harsh depiction of the colonial past. He characterized its setting as sordid, nocturnal, and threatening, emphasizing the film's striking visual treatment of its subject.

Raúl Manrupe and María Alejandra Portela similarly regarded the film as an ambitious and unusual treatment of its subject. They praised the visual impact of several passages and the unusually baroque quality of its characters and period setting, while describing the film as an undervalued work by Del Carril that had subsequently received little attention. Abel Posadas, writing in the magazine Crear in 1982, considered the film intellectually demanding but nevertheless fascinating. He argued that its treatment of sex, mysticism, and death distinguished it from a more conventional melodrama.

Contemporary critical reception was less uniformly favorable. A review in Gente de Cine acknowledged the film's intentions but considered the result a failure and a regression in Del Carril's development as a filmmaker, criticizing what it regarded as elaborate craftsmanship without sufficient vigor, personality, or style. Later scholarship has situated this response within the broader rejection of classical melodrama by the younger generation of Argentine critics, who increasingly favored more explicitly auteurist approaches to filmmaking.

More recent assessments have emphasized the film's expressionist visual style. Fernando Martín Peña has described its treatment of Catalina as the most expressionistic mise-en-scène of Del Carril's career, linking the style to the character's cruelty, the mythical dimensions of her legend, and the moral conflict at the center of Eduardo Borrás's screenplay. Horacio González has likewise characterized the film as a rare Gothic work, emphasizing its sordid nocturnal imagery and its treatment of Catalina as a woman struggling against the constraints of a rigid social and religious order.

== Awards ==
- Silver Condor Award for Best Film — winner, 1956
- Silver Condor Award for Best Actor — Antonio Vilar, winner, 1956
