= Días de ilusión =

- Directed by: Fernando Ayala
- Written by: Eugenio Juan Zappietro; Poldy Bird
- Produced by: Fernando Ayala; Héctor Olivera; Luis Osvaldo Repetto
- Starring: Andrea Del Boca; Luisina Brando; Fernando Siro
- Cinematography: Victor Hugo Caula
- Edited by: Carlos Piaggio
- Music by: Oscar Cardozo Ocampo
- Production company: Aries Cinematográfica Argentina
- Distributed by: Aries Cinematográfica Argentina
- Release date: 3 July 1980
- Running time: 90 min.
- Country: Argentina
- Language: Spanish

Días de ilusión (Spanish: Days of Illusion) is a 1980 Argentine film directed by Fernando Ayala. It is based on a short story Mamá de niebla by Poldy Bird.

== Cast ==
- Andrea Del Boca
- Luisina Brando
- Fernando Siro
- Hilda Bernard
- Alita Román
- Nya Quesada
