= Captura recomendada =

- Directed by: Don Napy
- Written by: Antonio Corma, Don Napy
- Produced by: Julio Oscar Villareal
- Starring: Julián Bourges, Pedro Buchardo, Margarita Corona
- Cinematography: Roque Giaccovino
- Edited by: Rosalino Caterbeti, Jorge Levillotti
- Music by: Argentino Galván
- Release date: 26 July 1950 (Argentina)
- Running time: 90 min
- Country: Argentina
- Language: Spanish

Captura recomendada is a 1950 Argentine film directed by Don Napy during the classical era of Argentine cinema.

== Cast ==
- Julián Bourges
- Pedro Buchardo
- Margarita Corona
- Elda Dessel
- Lucio Deval
- Gloria Ferrandiz
- Carmen Giménez
- Carlos Ginés
- Julia Giusti
- José Guisone
- Ricardo Lavié
- Onofre Lovero
- Domingo Mania ... Doctor
- Marcelle Marcell
- José Maurer
