= The Street Next to the Moon =

- Directed by: Román Viñoly Barreto
- Written by: Ulyses Petit de Murat
- Cinematography: Antonio Prieto
- Edited by: Alfredo Levinsky
- Music by: Isidro B. Maiztegui
- Release date: 25 October 1951
- Country: Argentina
- Language: English

The Street Next to the Moon (Spanish: La Calle junto a la luna) is a 1951 Argentine romantic drama film directed by Román Viñoly Barreto during the classical era of Argentine cinema.

== Cast ==
- Narciso Ibáñez Menta …Evaristo Carriego
- Isabel Pradas
- Diana Ingro
- Raúl del Valle
- Elisardo Santalla
- María Armand
- Silvia Labardén
- Carlos Belluci
- Iris Láinez
- Juan Carrara
- Luis de Tejada
- Ángel Laborde …Florencio Sánchez
- Néstor Atilio Yoan …Enrique Carriego
- Enrique Serrano…Charles de Soussans
- Amalia Bernabé
- Fernando Siro
- Mario Cossa …Niño inválido
- Francisco Barletta
- Nicandro Fuente
