= The Amphitheatre (film) =

- Spanish: El Reñidero
- Directed by: René Múgica
- Written by: Sergio De Cecco; René Múgica; Martín Rodríguez Mentasti
- Produced by: Guido Aletti; Martín Rodríguez Mentasti; Salvador Salias; Carlos Stevani
- Starring: Alfredo Alcón; Fina Basser
- Cinematography: Ricardo Aronovich
- Edited by: Gerardo Rinaldi; Antonio Ripoll
- Music by: Adolfo Morpurgo
- Release date: May 13, 1965 (Argentina)
- Running time: 73 minutes
- Country: Argentina
- Language: Spanish

The Amphitheatre (Spanish: El Reñidero) is a 1965 Argentine film directed by René Múgica.

== Cast ==
- Alfredo Alcón
- Fina Basser
- Rafael Chumbito - Hombre en reñidero
- Milagros de la Vega
- Francisco de Paula
- Rafael Diserio - Hombre en velorio
- Zelmar Gueñol
- Lautaro Murúa
- Haydée Padilla
- Lola Palombo
- Francisco Petrone
- Carlos Daniel Reyes - Zárate
- Jorge Salcedo
- Myriam de Urquijo
