= Corrientes, Street of Dreams =

1949 film

- Directed by: Román Viñoly Barreto
- Written by: Luis Saslavsky
- Produced by: Luis Saslavsky
- Cinematography: Gumer Barreiros
- Edited by: Oscar Carchano
- Music by: Mariano Mores, Enrique Santos Discépolo
- Distributed by: Film Andes S.A.
- Release date: 29 September 1949
- Running time: 73 minute
- Country: Argentina
- Language: Spanish

Corrientes, Street of Dreams (Spanish: Corrientes, calle de ensueños) is a 1949 Argentine musical film of the classical era of Argentine cinema, directed by Román Viñoly Barreto and starring Mariano Mores and Yeya Duciel.

== Plot ==
A humble musician triumphs by overcoming his failures, and a young woman who arrives in Buenos Aires from the interior of the country searches for triumph but meets death.

== Cast ==
- Mariano Mores
- Yeya Duciel
- Judith Sulián
- Lydia Quintana
- Maruja Roig
- Amalia Bernabé
- Diana Ingro
- Carlos Lagrotta
- Diego Marcote
- Carlos Belluci
- Chas de Cruz
- Fernando Lamas
