= Rena Costa Center for Yiddish Studies =

The Rena Costa Center for Yiddish Studies, a part of Bar-Ilan University, is dedicated to the academic study of Yiddish language and culture. The center's home is in the Faculty of Jewish Studies in the Bar-Ilan University campus in Ramat Gan, Israel. The center was named after Rena Costa, a philanthropist and refugee from German-occupied Europe circa World War II.

== Activities ==
The center is the largest university center for Yiddish language instruction in the world. Every year, hundreds of Bar-Ilan University students enroll in courses in Yiddish language and culture. The center's distinguished Yiddish scholars are mentors to a new generation of Yiddish students. They expand the spheres of Yiddish studies through research chairs and original publications which generate renewed interest in all areas of Yiddish studies. Bar-Ilan University's Rena Costa Center is unique in its requirement that master's and doctoral students submit their dissertations in Yiddish.

The center conducts activities both within the university and in the outside world. Israel's Ministry of Education has appointed Bar-Ilan University to supervise Yiddish instruction in all of Israel's public elementary and high schools. The Rena Costa Center certifies Yiddish teachers and provides in-service programs to help them enhance and enliven their school curricula. Through the center, hundreds of Israel schoolchildren—native Israelis, immigrants from the former Soviet Union, and children of immigrants of Ashkenazic and Sephardic heritage—learn to speak Yiddish and appreciate Yiddish culture. Many students qualify for their high school matriculation exams in Yiddish.

The Rena Costa Center participates in educating a new generation of Yiddish scholars and pedagogues to teach in communities across the globe. The Rena Costa Center distributes study guides to a wide range of educational institutions, and has conducted college-level seminars in the Yiddish language in Moscow, Kyiv and Odessa. In Israel, the Center brings together people from all over the world to participate in special study programs. Many of the center's seminars and symposia are open to the public, fostering interest and active participation by the community at large.

== Libraries ==
The Center comprise two main libraries. The Central Yiddish Library, located on the premises of the Bar-Ilan Central Library, encompasses some 30,000 books, as well as a collection of Yiddish films and musical performances. The other, The Lasowsky-Bronstein Seminar Library, is on the premises of the Yiddish Center. It houses, among other things, the personal archives of Emma Schaver, Dina Halpern, Yosef José Maurer, Yitzhak Shmulevitz, Mordechai Halamish, Eliezer Podriatchik, and Rabbi Dr. Heshil Klepfish.
