= Papá corazón se quiere casar =

1974 film by Enrique Cahen Salaberry

- Directed by: Enrique Cahen Salaberry
- Written by: Abel Santa Cruz
- Cinematography: Ricardo Younis
- Music by: Tito Ribero
- Release date: 6 June 1974
- Running time: 80 mins.
- Country: Argentina
- Language: Spanish

Papá corazón se quiere casar is a 1974 Argentine film directed by Enrique Cahen Salaberry and written by Abel Santa Cruz.

The film is an adaptation of the TV series Papá corazón broadcast in Argentina in 1973 and retains the same cast. It received mixed reviews.

== Cast ==
- Norberto Suárez as Maximiliano de María
- Andrea Del Boca as Angélica "Pinina" de María
- Laura Bove as Camila
- Elcira Olivera Garcés as Tía Peluca
- Liliana Benard as Sister Renata
- Nelly Prono as Mother Superior
- Elizabeth Killian as Cristina
- Diana Ingro as Cristina's mother
- Julián Bourgués
- Augusto Codecá
- Jorge de la Riestra
- Tristán Díaz Ocampo
