= Secret Ceremony =

1968 film by Joseph Losey

- Theatrical release poster
- Directed by: Joseph Losey
- Screenplay by: George Tabori
- Based on: Ceremonia secreta by Marco Denevi
- Produced by: John Heyman; Norman Priggen
- Starring: Elizabeth Taylor; Mia Farrow; Robert Mitchum
- Cinematography: Gerald Fisher
- Edited by: Reginald Beck
- Music by: Richard Rodney Bennett
- Production company: World Film Services
- Distributed by: Universal Pictures
- Release dates: 23 October 1968 (United States); 19 June 1969 (London)
- Running time: 109 minutes
- Country: United Kingdom
- Language: English
- Budget: $2.5 million or $3.1 million
- Box office: $5.2 million

Secret Ceremony is a 1968 British psychological thriller film directed by Joseph Losey and starring Elizabeth Taylor, Mia Farrow and Robert Mitchum. Based on the 1960 novel Ceremonia secreta by Argentine author Marco Denevi, the film follows an indigent prostitute who meets a strange young girl who insists that she is her long-lost mother.

== Plot ==
While on a bus in London, Leonora, an ageing prostitute, is approached by a waiflike young woman, Cenci, who utters the word "mummy". Cenci follows Leonora to a cemetery where the latter stops to mourn her daughter, who drowned five years earlier at the age of 10. Leonora is taken aback by Cenci's resemblance to her deceased daughter, and hesitantly agrees to accompany the girl to her opulent mansion, where she lives alone. Leonora soon finds that she bears a striking resemblance to Cenci's late mother, Margaret. Although initially unsettled by Cenci's childlike behaviour and need for affection, Leonora agrees to live with her as her surrogate mother.

Leonora hides when Cenci's aunts Hannah and Hilda unexpectedly visit the mansion. The aunts antagonise Cenci while surreptitiously stealing valuable objects, which is witnessed by Leonora. The next day, Leonora visits Hannah and Hilda at their antique shop, lying that she is Margaret's cousin. The aunts tell Leonora that Cenci took care of Margaret through her illness with no help, and that she refused to accept her mother's death. They also reveal that Cenci is 22 years old, despite looking and acting much younger, and that Margaret threw out Cenci's stepfather, Albert, after catching him trying to seduce Cenci. Leonora admonishes the aunts for failing to protect Cenci and warns them to stay away from the mansion.

While alone in the mansion, Cenci is visited by Albert. After she trims his beard, he asks her to make the moaning sounds she made while they had sex; she refuses but eventually obliges, leading Albert to kiss Cenci. Leonora returns to the mansion to find a shaken Cenci cowering under a sink, and Cenci mentions Albert's visit. Leonora and Cenci later check into a luxurious seaside hotel. That night, when Cenci arrives at the dining room sporting a fake baby bump, Leonora is stunned but plays along with the ruse.

The next morning, Albert arrives and confronts Leonora on the beach, declaring that Cenci is mentally unstable and had repeatedly tried to seduce him. Back in their hotel room, Cenci begins to kiss Leonora's back while giving her a back massage, before Leonora angrily tells Cenci to stop. Leonora then forces Cenci to face reality by ripping off her fake baby bump, sending Cenci into a frenzy. Later, from her balcony, Leonora witnesses Cenci and Albert having sex on the beach. When Cenci returns, she sends Leonora away, no longer seeing her as her mother.

Back in London, Cenci overdoses on pills, intending to commit suicide. Shortly afterwards, Leonora visits Cenci and begs to be allowed to stay in the mansion, but Cenci rebuffs her once again. As Leonora leaves, Cenci collapses to her death. Standing beside Albert in silence at Cenci's funeral, Leonora pulls out a knife and stabs him to death. Lying on her bed, Leonora listlessly hits the cord of a ceiling lamp while reciting a nursery rhyme about perseverance.

== Cast ==
- Elizabeth Taylor as Leonora
- Mia Farrow as Cenci
- Robert Mitchum as Albert
- Peggy Ashcroft as Hannah
- Pamela Brown as Hilda
- Robert Douglas as Sir Alex Gordon (uncredited)
- George Howell as first cleaner (uncredited)
- Penelope Keith as hotel assistant (uncredited)
- Roger Lloyd Pack as cleaner (uncredited)
- Angus MacKay as vicar (uncredited)
- Michael Strong as Dr Walter Stevens (uncredited)

== Production ==
=== Development ===
The short story on which the film is based won a $5,000 prize in a competition run by Life en Español. It had already been filmed for Argentine television when it was optioned in 1963 by Dore Schary.

In an October 1969 interview with Roger Ebert, Mitchum claimed that the film's production was "in trouble" when he arrived and that his presence did not help.

=== Filming ===
The production budget for Secret Ceremony was between $2,450,000 and $3,173,212. The main location for the film was Debenham House in London. Other London locations were St Mary Magdalene Church in Paddington, the area around the Molyneux Monument in Kensal Green Cemetery and the junction of Chepstow Road and St Stephen's Mews in Paddington. The hotel and beach scenes were shot around the Grand Hotel Huis ter Duin in Noordwijk, the Netherlands.

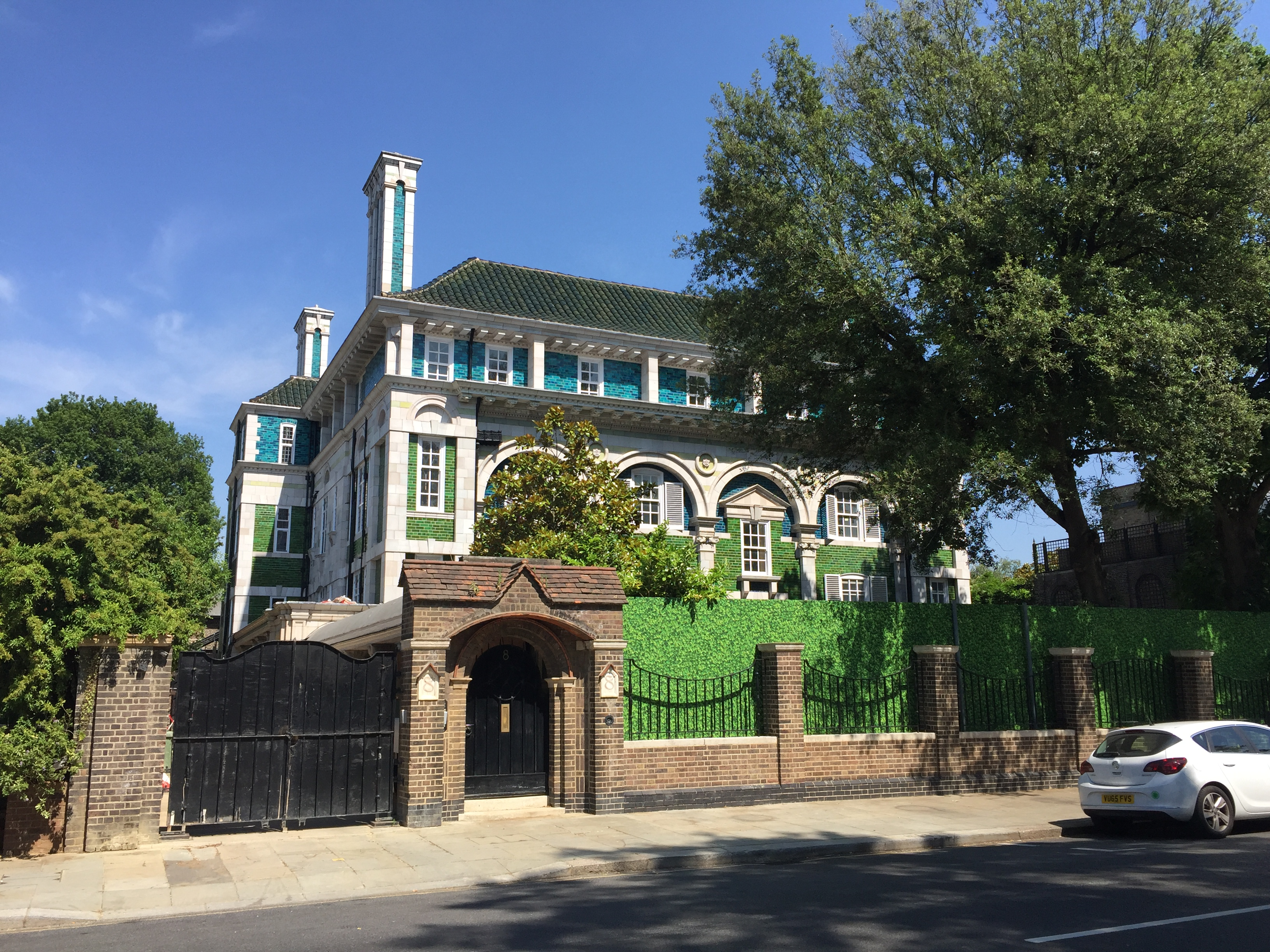
Debenham House

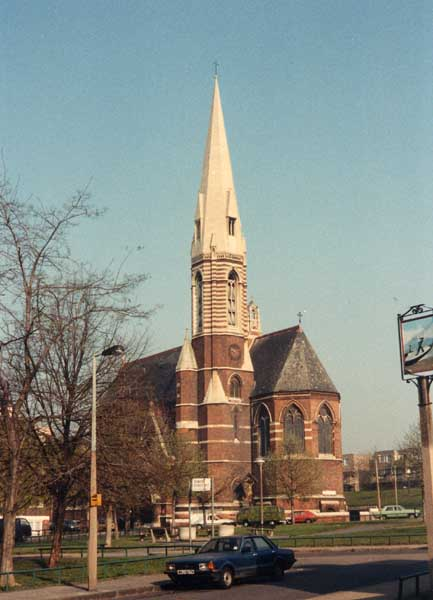
St Mary Magdalene Church

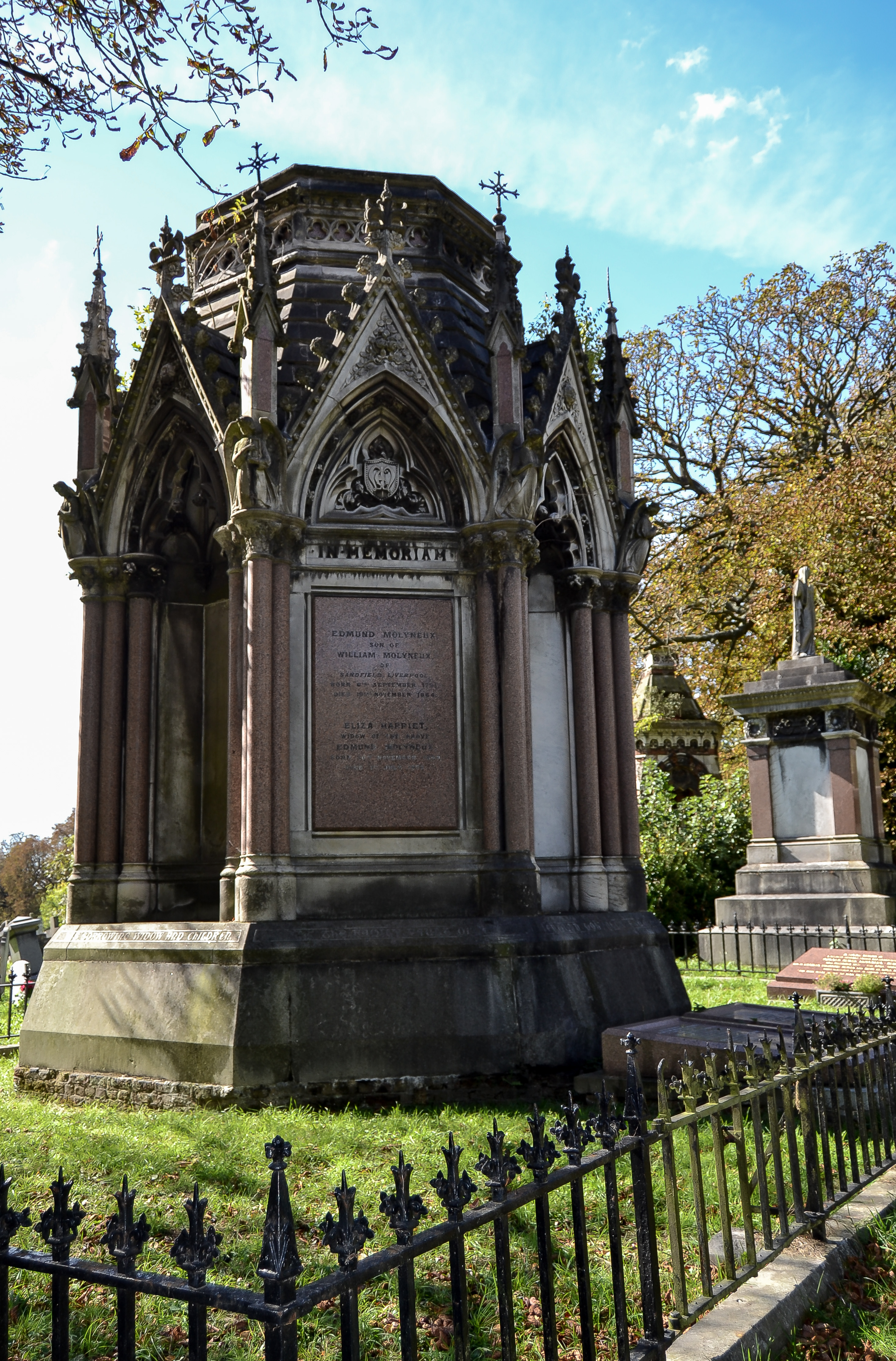
Kensal Green Cemetery

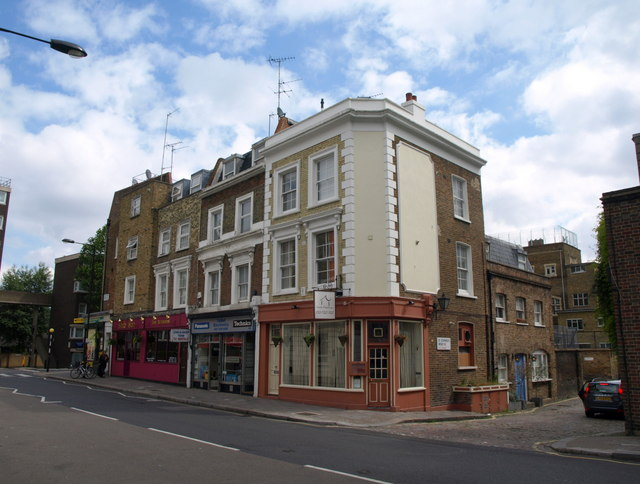
Chepstow Road corner shop

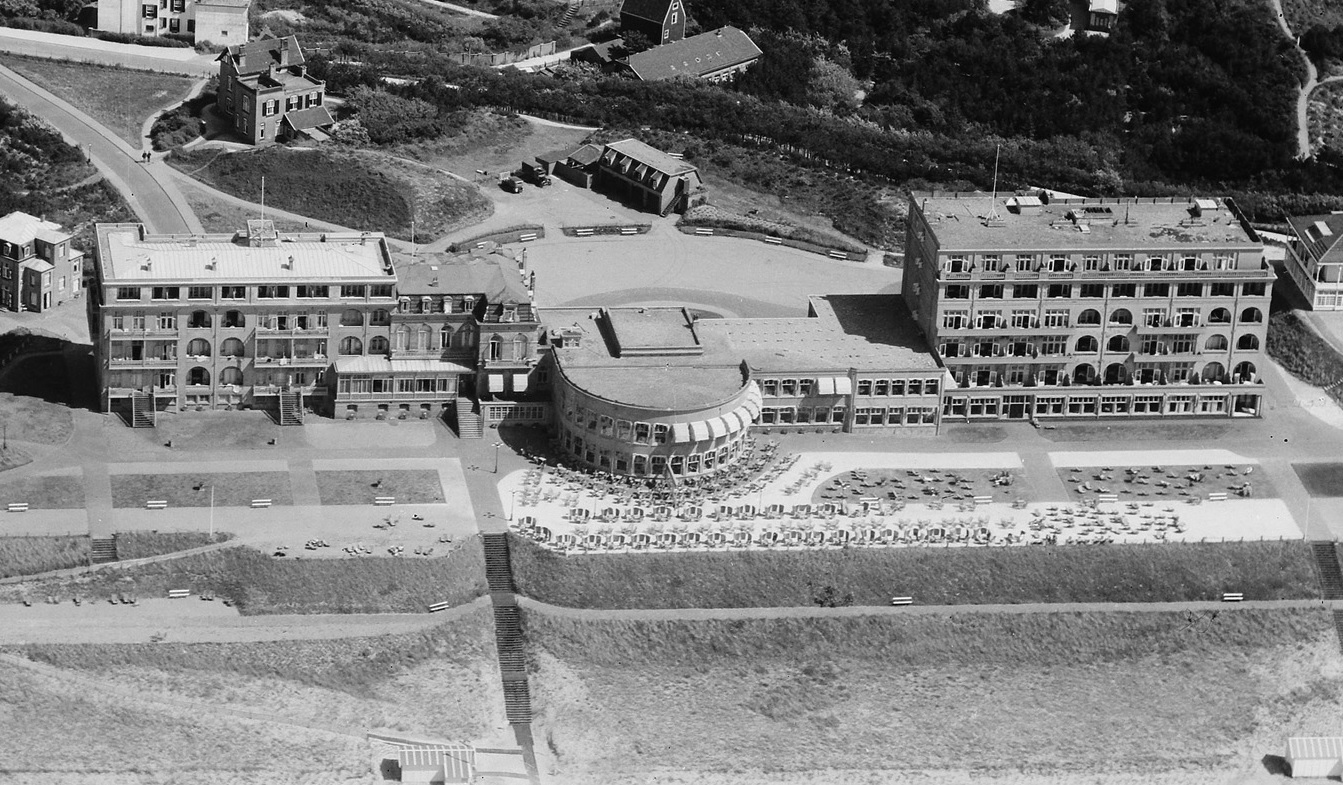
Hotel Huis ter Duin as it looked at the time

== Release ==
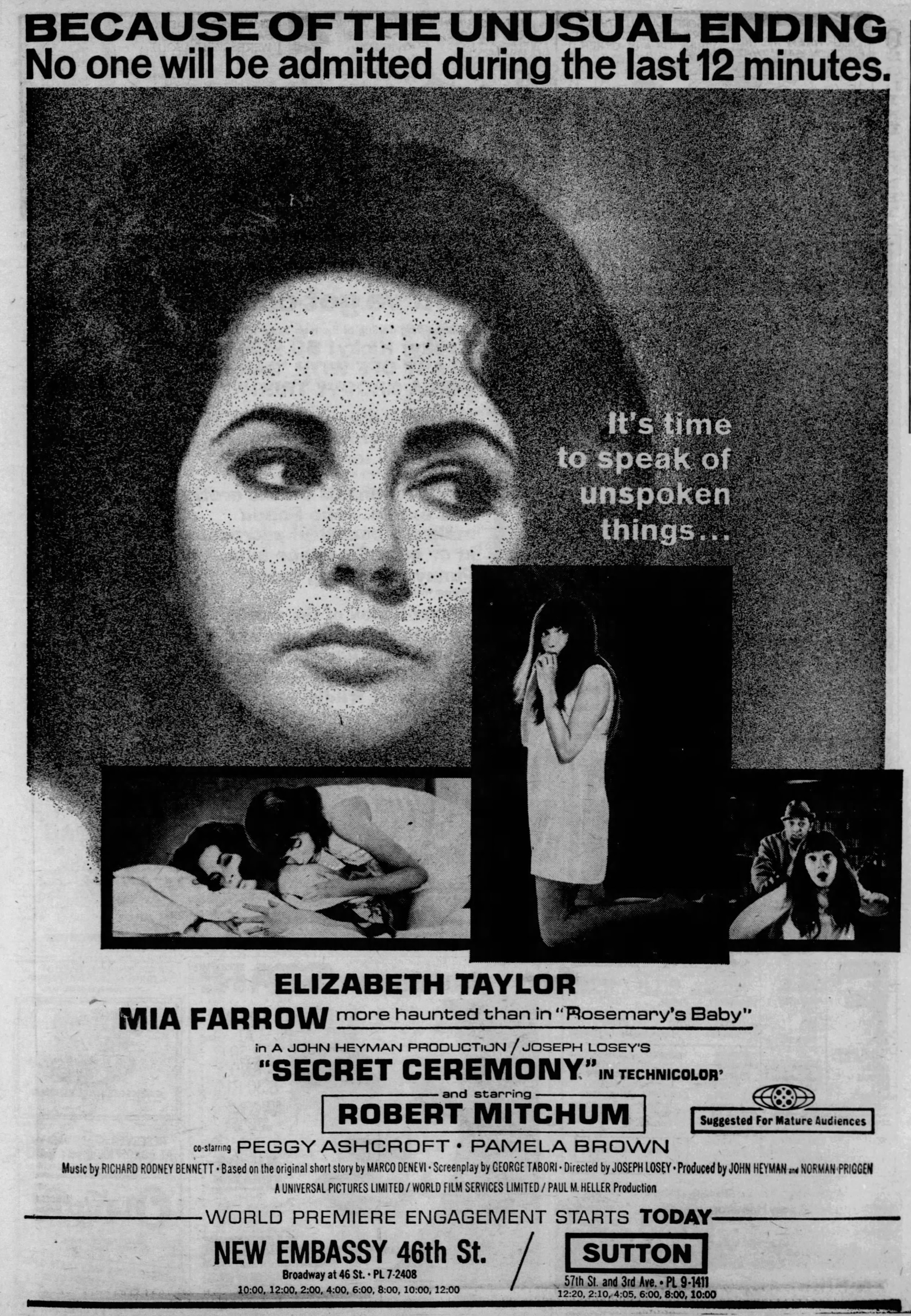
Theatrical advertisement from 1968

Secret Ceremony was released theatrically in the United States by Universal Pictures on 23 October 1968. It premiered in London the following year on 19 June 1969.

=== Home media ===
Universal Pictures Home Entertainment released Secret Ceremony on VHS on 31 October 2000 as part of their Universal Treasures line.

Kino Lorber issued a North American Blu-ray edition of the film on 21 April 2020. The British distributor Powerhouse Films subsequently released a Blu-ray in the United Kingdom.

== Reception ==
=== Box office ===
The film earned approximately $3 million in United States and Canadian rentals, with a worldwide total gross of $5,232,905.

=== Critical response ===
The Monthly Film Bulletin wrote: "Secret Ceremony is constructed on the dualist view of man as a battleground for the twin aspirations of Good and Evil. Appropriately, in view of its schizophrenic theme, two is the film's magic number: two mothers and two daughters, two aunts, two fathers, two funerals, two baptisms (one actual, one metaphorical when Leonora accepts Cenci as her daughter), and above all, two temples of communion. ... In many ways, notably in its insidious illumination of the fascination of madness, Secret Ceremony reminds one of Lilith [1964], but the style is entirely Losey's own, a return to the crystalline ellipses of Accident [1967] after the opulent undulations of Boom! [1968], and with superb, unexpectedly funny characterisations by the entire cast."

Renata Adler in the New York Times wrote that it was "incomparably better" than its predecessor, Accident, and that beneath its "elaborate fetishism and dragging prose, there is a touching story of people not helping enough," but she admitted that the film had its "longueurs, but not beyond endurance."

Ernest Callenbach of Film Quarterly wrote it was "difficult to guess" what the film was about, but felt that its "dominant note, if there is one, is of Losey's usual creepy, misanthropic disgust with sex and how people misuse each other to get it." He also praised Mia Farrow's "touching and perverse and human" performance.

=== Modern appraisal ===
Writing 30 years later after its release, John Patterson of The Guardian listed Secret Ceremony among the Losey films he dismissed as "woefully misguided material."

Dave Kehr of the Chicago Reader lambasted the film as embodying the director's "worst tendencies as a filmmaker: the movie is cold without being chilling, confusing without being challenging."

The Radio Times Guide to Films gave the film 2/5 stars, writing: "This moody mistaken-identity melodrama quickly becomes a macabre muddle of daft sexual psychosis and suspect psychology when nympho Mia Farrow adopts prostitute Elizabeth Taylor as her surrogate mother after a meeting on a London bus. The return of Farrow's stepfather Robert Mitchum provides this meandering morsel of Swinging Sixties gothic with a suitably off-the-wall climax.

Dan Callahan at Senses of Cinema suggests that Secret Ceremony's failures may serve as its virtues, comparing the film favorably to Some Like It Hot (1959) or Duck Soup (1933).

Callahan writes:

Secret Ceremony is a film that is so bad, so irredeemably, lovably foolish, that it provides the sort of life-embracing laughs many comedies fail to engender…Is there room to include such a film among a great director's great works? Unless we are unnecessarily stuffy, which would miss the point of his career entirely, the answer has to be yes.

Leslie Halliwell offers this concise critique: "Nuthouse melodrama for devotees of the director."
