= Los Ojos llenos de amor =

Los ojos llenos de amor
- Directed by: Carlos Schlieper
- Written by: Abel Santacruz
- Cinematography: Ricardo Younis
- Edited by: José Cardella
- Release date: 1954
- Running time: 85 minute
- Country: Argentina
- Language: Spanish

Los Ojos llenos de amor is a 1954 film of the classical era of Argentine cinema.

== Cast ==
- Ángel Magaña as Anibal Ferrán
- Malisa Zini
- Alicia Bellán
