= Myriam de Urquijo =

Argentine actress

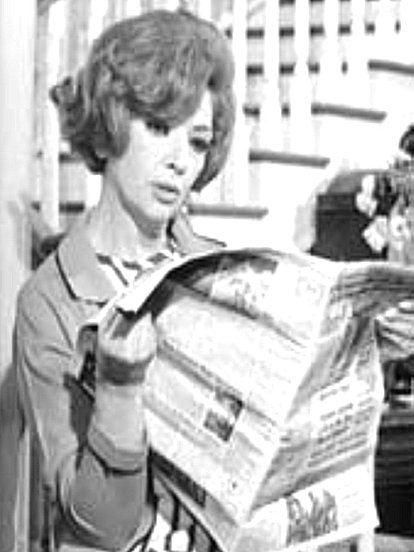
- Born: Pilar Palacios de Urquijo; 10 April 1918; Buenos Aires, Argentina
- Died: May 24, 2011 (aged 93); Buenos Aires, Argentina
- Years active: 1942–1979

Myriam de Urquijo (Buenos Aires, April 10, 1918 – May 24, 2011) born Pilar Palacios de Urquijo was an Argentine film, stage and television actress.

She first appeared on radio in 1942, with her first major film role La Vida de una mujer (1951). She died at age 93 on May 24, 2011.

== Filmography ==
- La vida de una mujer (1951)
- Dishonor (1952)
- Para vestir santos (1955)
- Angustia de un secreto (1959)
- Culpable (1960)
- La Cigarra no es un bicho (1963)
- Mujeres perdidas (1964)
- El reñidero (1965)
- Deliciously Amoral (1969)
- Las procesadas (1975)
- Crazy Women (1977)
- Los drogadictos (1979)

== Television ==
- Ligeia (1959 )
- Ciclo Myriam de Urquijo (1969 )
