= Falsificaciones =

Falsificaciones is a novel by Argentine author Marco Denevi. It was first published in 1966. The book contains 85 satirical short stories, each modeled after a different well-known literary work. "Génesis" is modeled after the first book of the Holy Bible, and describes a re-creation of the world after a nuclear apocalypse. "El dios de las moscas" (The God of the Flies) is also very similar to Genesis of the Holy Bible. Falsificaciones also includes satirical rewrites of Shakespeare's Romeo and Juliet and Miguel de Cervantes' Don Quijote.
