= Rebellion (1975 film) =

- Directed by: Carlos Biaghetti
- Produced by: Edgardo Clemente Niccolini
- Cinematography: Humberto Peruzzi
- Music by: Víctor Graña
- Release date: 1975
- Running time: 90 minute
- Country: Argentina
- Language: Spanish

Rebellion (Spanish:Rebeldía) is a 1975 Argentine film.

== Cast ==
The cast of this movie includes: Delfy de Ortega, Francisco de Paula, Linda Peretz and Gabriela Gili.
