= God's Money (film) =

- Directed by: Román Viñoly Barreto
- Written by: Ulises Petit de Murat
- Produced by: Argentina Sono Film
- Edited by: Jorge Gárate
- Release date: 1959
- Running time: 85 minutes
- Country: Argentina
- Language: Spanish

God's Money (Spanish: El dinero de Dios) is a 1959 Argentine film directed by Román Viñoly Barreto. It stars Carlos Estrada and Fina Basser.

== Plot ==
A man is led to commit a robbery by the woman he falls in love with later when he is released from the prison he takes refuge in a convent.

== Cast ==
- Francisco Petrone ...Francisco Alaria
- Fina Basser ...María de Lourdes
- Mario Lozano ...Inspector Campos
- Carlos Estrada ...Ramiro
- Carlos López Monet ...Torito
- Jorge Sobral ...Fray Mario
- Mariano Monclús ...Fray Hernando
- José Maurer ...Hombre en monasterio
- Enzo Bai ...Sacerdote
- Pedro Venturini
- Paquita Vehil ...Manicura
- Utimio Bertozzi
- Maruja Lopetegui ...Madre de Francisco
