= Chico Viola Não Morreu =

- Directed by: Román Viñoly Barreto
- Release date: 1955
- Running time: 100 minute
- Country: Argentina
- Language: Spanish

Chico Viola Não Morreu is a 1955 Argentine film directed by Román Viñoly Barreto.

== Cast ==
- Alexandre Amorim
- Paulo Gilvan Bezerril
- Blecaute
- Wilza Carla
- eArnóbio Carvalho
- Inalda de Carvalho
- Jacy de Oliveira
- Sérgio de Oliveira
- Moacyr Deriquém
- Cleonir dos Santos
- Cyl Farney ... Francisco Alves
- Edson França
- Geny França
- Wilson Grey
- Heloísa Helena
- Joe Lester
- Vera Lúcia Magalhães
- Laís Maria
- Avany Maura
- José Melo
- Tupiara Molina
- Paulo Montel
- Francisco moreno
- João Costa Neto
- D'Andréa Netto
- Domingos Pereira
- João Péricles
- Walter Quinteiro
- Maria Luiza Raposo
- Ruy Rey
- Frederico Schlee
- Túlio Varga
- Derek Wheatley
- Eva Wilma
