= The Virgin Man =

- Directed by: Román Viñoly Barreto
- Release date: 1956
- Running time: 113 minute
- Country: Argentina
- Language: Spanish

The Virgin Man (Spanish: El Hombre virgen) is a 1956 Argentine comedy film directed by Román Viñoly Barreto and starring Luis Sandrini.

== Cast ==
- Luis Sandrini
- Eduardo Sandrini
- Aída Luz
- Julie Bardot
- Antonia Herrero
- Bertha Moss

== Reception ==
Clarín wrote: “Román Viñoly Barreto’s direction is rather primitive. With few variations, it boils down to alternating long shots focused on the protagonist with brief shots focused on the other characters.” And Manrupe and Portela admitted that Sandrini "whose dialogues and monologues [were] as ornate as the set design" and the open ending could have been better.

The film is said to be part of time of transition in Luis Sandrini's career, introducing in his comedic roles a dose of sentimentalism and moralising emotions.
