= Cinco gallinas y el cielo =

- Directed by: Ruben W. Cavallotti
- Screenplay by: Agustín Cuzzani
- Starring: Narciso Ibáñez Menta
- Release date: 1957
- Running time: 75 minute
- Country: Argentina
- Language: Spanish

Cinco gallinas y el cielo is a 1957 Argentine science-fiction drama film directed by Uruguayan-born filmmaker Ruben W. Cavallotti, written by Agustín Cuzzani and starring Narciso Ibáñez Menta. The film won awards at the international festivals of Karlovy Vary and San Sebastian.

== Premise ==
A scientist conducts experiments on chickens by injecting them with a virus that causes anyone who eats them to become impulsive and daring.

== Cast ==
- Narciso Ibáñez Menta
- Luis Arata
- Irma Córdoba
- Alita Román
- Ricardo Castro Ríos
- Aurelia Ferrer
- Ignacio Quirós
- María Esther Corán
- Alberto Barcel

== Reception ==
La Razón remarked that it was "a production without major pretensions but with elements that make it interesting," while Calki (Raimundo Calcagno) noted "a degree of renewal in the themes of our cinema… a concern with the search for authentic imagery." Roland (Rolando Fustiñana) commented on "an excess of dialogue that is not very polished, a lack of unity in the narrative, and an uneven tone."

== Bibliography ==
- Manrupe, Raúl; Portela, María Alejandra (2001). Un diccionario de films argentinos (1930-1995) (in Spanish). Buenos Aires: Corregidor. ISBN 950-05-0896-6.
