= Alita Román =

Argentine actress (1912–1989)

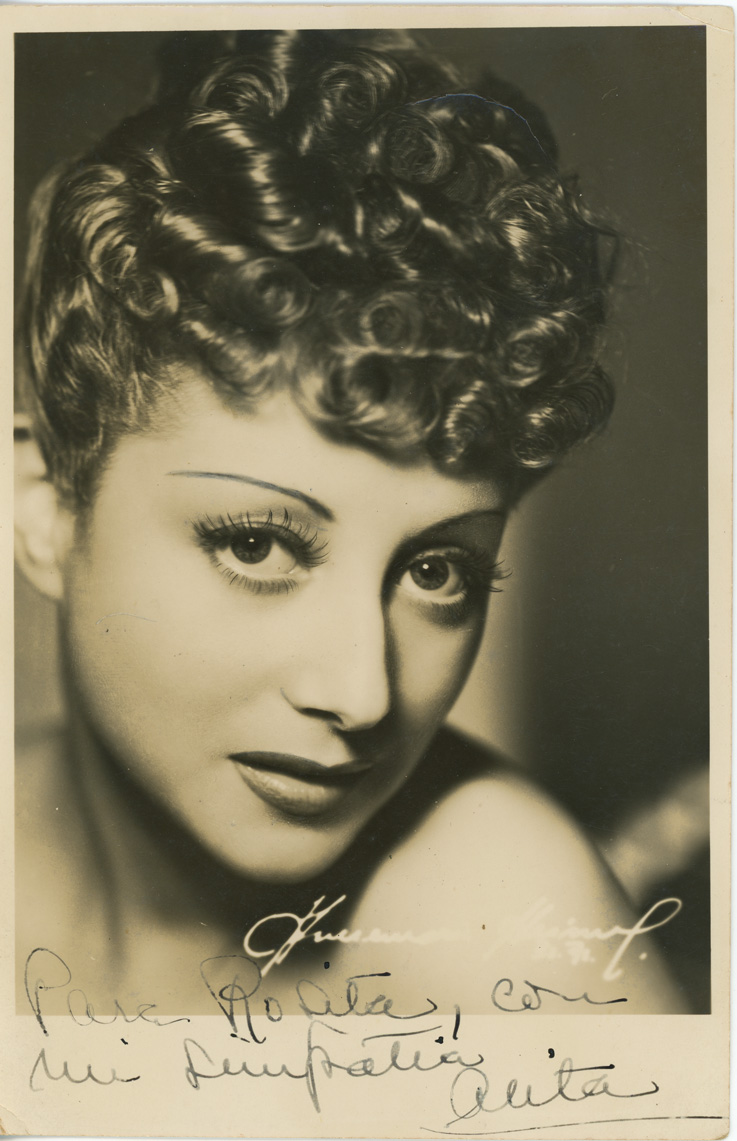
- Born: Alita Blanca Barchigia; 24 August 1912; Buenos Aires, Argentina
- Died: 15 April 1989 (aged 76)
- Years active: 1934–1983

Alita Blanca Barchigia (24 August 1912 – 15 April 1989), better known as Alita Román, was an Argentine film actress of the Golden Age of Argentine cinema.

She appeared in nearly 50 films between 1934 and 1982 and was a sought-after supporting actress, winning the Best Supporting Actress from the Argentine Academy of Cinematography Arts and Sciences for her work in Concierto de almas and playing in many box-office hits. She also performed in live theater and on television and radio.

== Biography ==
Román began her career in theater in the early 1930s, debuting with Narciso Ibáñez Menta and later joining the company of Lola Membrives. Her film debut was in a 1934 Sono Film production, Riachuelo, directed by Luis Moglia Barth starring Luis Sandrini and Héctor Calcaño.

Her next film La Barra Mendocina (1935), written and directed by Mario Soffici, was followed by El alma del bandoneón (1935) with Libertad Lamarque and Alicia Barrié.

In 1937, she made Mateo, written and directed by Daniel Tinayre and starring Luis Arata.

Simultaneously, she was working in radio. She worked with a group of actors on a program called "Compañía Juvenil de Arte" (Youth Art Troupe) which aired on Radio Splendid. One of the programs they aired was a radio drama called Reviviendo la emoción de los más bellos poemas, on which Román, along with Delia Garcés, Paul Lagarde, and Hugo Pimentel, among others, recited poems.

Her first major success came with Mujeres que trabajan (1938), which starred Mecha Ortiz, Pepita Serrador, Alicia Barrié, Sabina Olmos, Niní Marshall, and Hilda Sour, along with others. The film was Marshall's debut, after having done radio, and she was particularly praised, though all of the cast members' performances were rated highly. Román was often described as very photogenic.

Román followed that success with Mi suegra es una fiera (1939), under the direction Luis Bayón Herrera with Olinda Bozán and Paquito Busto; and El Loco Serenata (1939) directed by Luis Saslavsky for Argentina Sono Film and starring with Pepe Arias, which earned her a favorable review in The New York Times. In 1942, she made Ceniza al viento directed by Luis Saslavsky and starring Berta Singerman, María Duval, Luis Arata, Santiago Arrieta, and Tita Merello, among others; and Concierto de almas directed by Alberto de Zavalía and starring Delia Garcés.

Román won Best Supporting Actress from the Argentine Academy of Cinematography Arts and Sciences for her work in Concierto de almas.

She also did theater in the 1940s, starring with Luis Arata in Cada cual a su juego in 1944 with Arata’s Company which was performing at the Teatro Buenos Aires. In 1945, Román appeared in a musical comedy Los maridos engañan de 7 a 9 staged by "The Argentine Company of Comedy and Musical Comedy of Gloria Guzmán and Juan Carlos Thorry". The play opened in March at the Teatro Astral in Buenos Aires to excellent reviews. She performed in Delia Garcés' farewell production in Argentina, Claudia by Rose Franken, which played at the Odeón Theater in 1945.

From the late 1940s, she was a sought–after supporting actress, and participated in many award-winning films. In 1951, she made Los isleros (1951) directed by Lucas Demare and starring Tita Merello. Los isleros was submitted to the Cannes Film Festival as Argentina's entry and it was awarded a Silver Condor Award for Best Film, Best Director and Best Actress to Merello for 1952 from the Argentine Film Critics Association.

In 1956, Román appeared in Graciela, which starred Chilean actor Lautaro Murúa and earned him the 1957 Silver Condor Award for Best Actor.

In 1954 she starred in the one-woman television programme Mariquita y su teléfono, with only a phone as a prop.

In 1960, she appeared in the Antonio Cunill Jr. film Los Acusados and in 1969 she was in the comedy El Profesor hippie alongside actors such as Luis Sandrini and Roberto Escalada.

From the mid-1960s, she worked in television series such as Ella, la gata (1967), Nino, las cosas simples de la vida (1971), Novia de vacaciones (1979), Trampa para un soñador (1980) and made her last performances in Aprender a vivir (1981) and Los días contados (1983). She made her last two movies Días de ilusión, and then Toto Paniagua in 1980.

== Death ==
Alita Román died on 15 April 1989 in Buenos Aires, aged 76.

== Filmography ==
=== Film ===
- Riachuelo (1934)
- La barra mendocina (1935)
- El alma del bandoneón (1935)
- Mateo (1937)
- Mujeres que trabajan (1938)
- Jettatore (1938)
- Mi suegra es una fiera (1939)
- La modelo y la estrella (1939)
- Margarita, Armando y su padre (1939)
- El Loco Serenata (1939)
- Encadenado (1940)
- Fragata Sarmiento (1940)
- Con el dedo en el gatillo (1940)
- Confesión (1940)
- Napoleón (1941)
- Concierto de almas (1942)
- Ceniza al viento (1942)
- Ponchos azules (1942)
- Eclipse de sol (1942)
- Cuando florezca el naranjo (1943)
- Los hombres las prefieren viudas (1943)
- Casa de muñecas (1943)
- Centauros del pasado (1944)
- Besos perdidos (1945)
- Camino del infierno (1945)
- El diablo andaba en los choclos (1946)
- Edición extra (1949)
- La muerte está mintiendo (1950)
- La culpa la tuvo el otro (1950)
- Los Isleros (1951)
- Escándalo nocturno (1951)
- Sombras en la frontera (1951)
- La Calle del pecado (1954)
- Mujeres casadas (1954)
- Cuando Buenos Aires se adormece (inconclusa - 1955)
- Graciela (1956)
- Oro bajo (1956)
- Cinco gallinas y el cielo (1957)
- Spring of Life (1957)
- Los acusados (1960)
- El bote, el río y la gente (1960)
- Barcos de papel (1963)
- El profesor hippie (1969)
- Días de ilusión (1980)
- Toto Paniagua (1980)

=== Television ===
- Mariquita y su teléfono (1954)
- Ella... la gata (1967) (telenovela)
- La hora Fate (1960-1962) Episode: "Mujercitas"
- Gran teatro universal (1970) Episode: "La loca de la casa"
- Soledad, un destino sin amor (1970-1971) (telenovela)
- Ciclo de teatro argentino (1971) Episode: "Rostro Perdido"
- Alta Comedia (1971) Episode: "Recuerdo a Mamá"
- Nino, las cosas simples de la vida (1971/1972)
- La selva es mujer (1972-1973) (telenovela)
- Amar al ladrón (1973) (telenovela)
- Vermouth de teatro argentino (1974) Episode: "Historia de mi esquina"
- Novia de vacaciones (1979) (telenovela)
- Dos y Bartolo (1980)
- Trampa para un soñador (1980/1981) (telenovela)
- Quiero gritar tu nombre (1981)
- Aprender a vivir (1981-1982)
- Área peligrosa (1982) (mini-series)
- Los días contados (1983) (telenovela)
