= Maruja Montes =

Brazilian-born Argentine actress and vedette

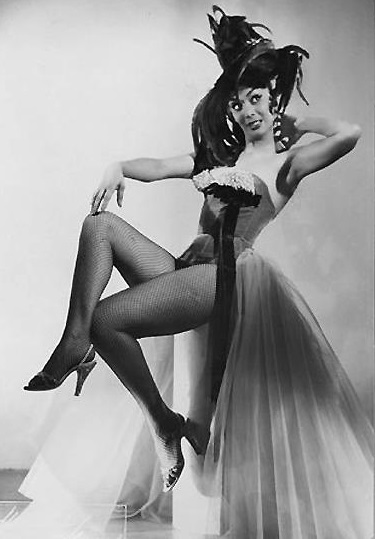
- Montes in 1960
- Born: María Miterloi Hernández; 24 March 1930; São Paulo, Brazil
- Died: 11 June 1993 (aged 63); Buenos Aires, Argentina
- Occupations: Vedette, actress
- Years active: 1946-1970

María Miterloi Hernández (24 March 1930 – 11 June 1993), better known by her stage name Maruja Montes, was a Brazilian-born Argentine actress and vedette who performed during the middle part of the 20th century.

== Biography ==
Montes was born on 24 March 1930 in São Paulo, Brazil. She came to Argentina with her mother, María Magdalena Rosario Garrido, and brother Agustín Hernández and became a naturalized Argentine citizen. She was a showgirl in the burlesque and comedy theaters of Argentina in the 1950s and made ten films. She committed suicide on 11 June 1993 in Buenos Aires, Argentina.

== Filmography ==
- Noche flamenca (1946)
- Marido de ocasión (1952)
- Ésta es mi vida (1952)
- Trompada 45 (1953)
- Corazón fiel (1954)
- Vida nocturna (1955)
- Los hermanos corsos (1955)
- Bacará (1955) .... Yvonne
- Estrellas de Buenos Aires (1956)
- Historia de una carta (1957)
- La potranca (1960)
