= Nelly Prono =

Paraguayan actress

- Born: August 7, 1926
- Died: August 29, 1997 (aged 71)
- Occupation: Actress

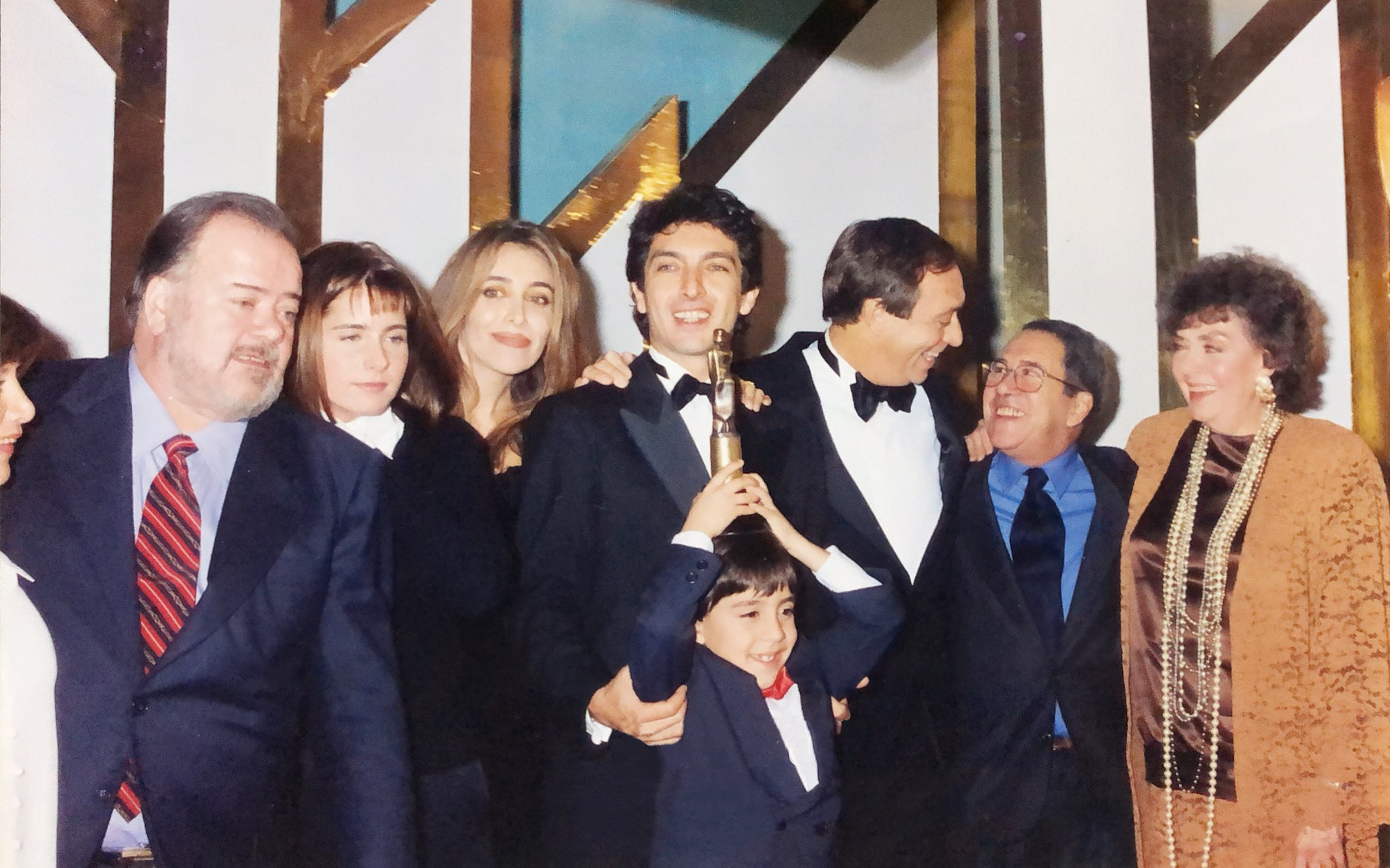
Nelly Prono (r) celebrates the Martín Fierro Award given to the sitcom Mi Cuñado ('My Brother-in-Law') with other cast members in 1994.

Nelly Prono (August 7, 1926 – August 29, 1997) was a Paraguayan actress who had a long career in Argentine theatre, radio, television and film.

She began in Argentine theatre in 1947 with María Esther Podestá. She appeared in productions such as Françoise Billetdoux's Noche de noche, Florencio Sánchez's Barranca abajo, Jacobo Langsner's Una margarita llamada Mercedes in which she appeared opposite China Zorrilla, Bertolt Brecht's Contra la seducción, and Marisé Monteiro's Hoy llega Ezequiel, among others. In the 1970s and 1980s she enjoyed a film career, appearing in pictures such as Pájaro loco (1971), Papá Corazón se quiere casar (1974), Los enemigos (1983), and Fernando Ayala's Pasajeros de una pesadilla (1984), among others. In television one of her notable roles was in Andrea Celeste, with Andrea Del Boca. Ayrıca Manuela dizisindeki Gabriela rolü ile de bilinir.

She died in 1997 after a stroke and a period in vegetative state.

== Filmography ==
- Setenta veces siete (1962) .... La dueña
- Psexoanálisis (1968)
- Deliciosamente amoral (1969)
- El señor Presidente (1969)
- Los mochileros (1970)
- Pájaro loco (1971)
- La gran ruta (1971)
- Papá Corazón se quiere casar (1974)
- Comedia rota (1978)
- Cuatro pícaros bomberos (1979)
- El poder de las tinieblas (1979)
- Este loco amor loco (1979)
- Los enemigos (1983)
- Pasajeros de una pesadilla (1984) .... Carmen
- Gracias por el fuego (1984)
- Otra historia de amor (1986)
- Tómame (1992)
- La revelación (1996)
- Comodines (1997)
