= The Accused (1960 film) =

1960 film

- Los Acusados
- Directed by: Antonio Cunill Jr.
- Written by: Antonio Cunill Jr. Marco Denevi
- Produced by: Antonio Cunill Jr.
- Starring: Mario Soffici; Silvia Legrand
- Release date: 10 March 1960
- Running time: 90 minute
- Country: Argentina
- Language: Spanish

The Accused (Spanish: Los Acusados) is a 1960 Argentine crime drama directed and written by Antonio Cunill Jr. The film was based on a screen play by Marco Denevi. The film starred Mario Soffici and Silvia Legrand.

== Plot ==
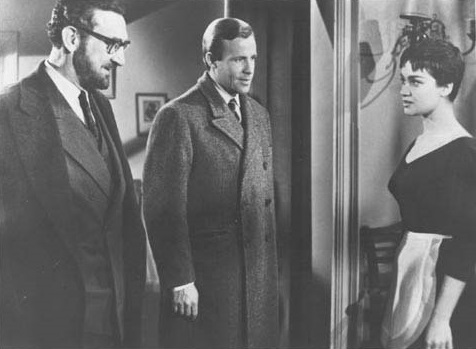

Based on a real-life case in 1925, two great lawyers argue the case for and against a science teacher accused of the crime of teaching evolution.

== Cast ==
- Mario Soffici
- Silvia Legrand
- Guillermo Battaglia
- Alita Román
- Julián Bourges
- Juan Carlos Galván
- Trissi Bauer
- Virginia Romay
- Mario Danesi
- Osvaldo Terranova
- Héctor Gance
- Enrique Kossi
- José María Fra
- Roberto Bordoni

== Release ==
The film was released on 10 March 1960.
