= Concierto de almas (film) =

- Directed by: Alberto de Zavalía
- Written by: Alejandro Casona
- Produced by: Monumental
- Starring: Delia Garces
- Cinematography: Paul Perry
- Release date: 25 May 1942
- Running time: 73 minutes
- Country: Argentina
- Language: Spanish

Concierto de almas is a 1942 Argentine film directed by Alberto de Zavalía during the Golden Age of Argentine cinema.

== Cast ==
- Delia Garcés
- Pedro López Lagar
- Alita Román
- Teresa Serrador
- Carlos Morganti
- Ernesto Raquén
