= La Barra Mendocina =

- Directed by: Mario Soffici
- Written by: Mario Soffici
- Starring: Oscar Villa
- Narrated by: Mario Soffici
- Cinematography: Francis Boeniger
- Release date: August 2, 1935
- Country: Argentina
- Language: Spanish

La Barra Mendocina is a 1935 Argentine comedy film directed and written by Mario Soffici. The film premiered on August 2, 1935 in Buenos Aires during the Golden Age of Argentine cinema.

== Synopsis ==
A play about the experiences of two young men from the city of Mendoza who travel to Buenos Aires attracted by the big city.

== Main cast ==
- Alberto Anchart Sr
- Alberto Bello
- Antonio Ber Ciani
- Dringue Farías
- José Gola
- Pilar Gómez
- Anita Jordán
- Lalo Malcolm
- Elsa O'Connor
- Alita Román
- Marcelo Ruggero
- Juan Sarcione
- Marino Seré
- Oscar Villa
