= At Night You Also Sleep =

De noche también se duerme
- Film poster
- Directed by: Enrique Carreras
- Written by: Abel Santacruz
- Produced by: Angel Zavalía
- Starring: Ana Mariscal; Olga Zubarry; Jorge Rivier; Roberto Escalada
- Cinematography: Américo Hoss
- Edited by: José Gallego
- Music by: Vlady
- Production companies: Productora General Belgrano and Quaranteed Pictures
- Distributed by: Productora General Belgrano and Quaranteed Pictures
- Release date: January 19, 1956
- Running time: 82 minutes
- Country: Argentina
- Language: Spanish

At Night You Also Sleep (De noche también se duerme) is a 1956 Argentine comedy film directed by Enrique Carreras and written by Abel Santacruz. It stars Ana Mariscal, Jorge Rivier, Roberto Escalada and Olga Zubarry, and premiered on 19 January.

== Plot ==
A divorced couple find their path to reuniting complicated by another couple. Elvira (Zubarry) swallows some powder and passes out. The doctor (Escalada) is called.

== Cast ==
- Ana Mariscal as Rosalía
- Olga Zubarry as Elvira
- Jorge Rivier as Miguel
- Roberto Escalada as Dr. Juan Carlos Carreño
- Francisco Álvarez as Don Ramiro
- Tono Andreu as Gervasio
- Héctor Armendáriz as Vicente
- Elcira Olivera Garcés as Carmen
- Emilio Vieyra
- María Esther Podestá as Doña Beba
- Julia Dalmas
- Roberto Lombard
- Nina Marqui
- Irma Román
- Fernando Reynal
- Raquel Beney
- Gogó Andreu
- Irma Álvarez

== Reception ==
La Nación called the film "equivocal and entangled in smiling comedy". El Mundo wrote: "Enrique Carreras takes the straightest and most comfortable path."
