= Amalia Bernabé =

Argentine actress (1895–1983)

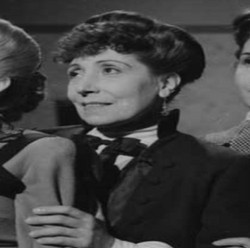
- Bernabé in 1939
- Born: 28 April 1895; Buenos Aires, Argentina
- Died: 10 September 1983 (aged 88); Buenos Aires, Argentina
- Occupation: Actress
- Years active: 1937-1982 (film)

Amalia Bernabé (1895–1983) was an Argentine stage and film actress. She appeared in around fifty films during her screen career which stretched from the Golden Age of Argentine Cinema (1930s–1950s) to the 1980s.

== Selected filmography ==
- The Boys of the Old Days Didn't Use Hair Gel (1937)
- Three Argentines in Paris (1938)
- Encadenado (1940)
- Story of a Bad Woman (1948)
- Corrientes, Street of Dreams (1949)
- Valentina (1950)
- The Street Next to the Moon (1951)
- The Beast Must Die (1952)
- The Grandfather (1954)
- Rosaura at 10 O'clock (1954)

== Bibliography ==
- Pellettieri, Osvaldo. Pirandello y el teatro argentino (1920-1990). Editorial Galerna, 1997.
