= Bacará =

- Film poster
- Directed by: Kurt Land
- Written by: Emilio Villalba Welsh
- Starring: Warly Ceriani; Mario Lozano
- Distributed by: Artistas Argentinos Asociados
- Release date: 17 November 1955
- Running time: 85 minute
- Country: Argentina
- Language: Spanish

Bacará is a 1955 Argentine drama film directed by Kurt Land and starring Ana Mariscal and Jorge Rivier.

== Cast ==
- Ana Mariscal as Lucía
- Jorge Rivier as Alberto Debreil
- Nathán Pinzón as Julián
- Maruja Montes as Yvonne
- Mario Lozano as Gastón
- Alberto Berco as Santiago Olivera
- Susana Campos as Marta
- Julio Bianquet as Genovés
- Jesús Pampín as Médico
- Warly Ceriani as Salías
- Leyla Dartel
- Miguel Ángel Olmos
- Miguel Ángel Valera
- A. Nenna False
- Elina Montiel as Felisa
