= By the Sweat of Your Brow =

- Directed by: Román Viñoly Barreto
- Written by: Tulio Demicheli, José Ramón Luna, Raimundo Calcagno
- Produced by: Armando Bo
- Starring: Armando Bo; Diana Ingro; Alba Múgica
- Cinematography: Gumer Barreiros
- Edited by: Oscar Carchano
- Music by: Alberto Gnecco
- Release date: 1949
- Running time: 76 minutes
- Country: Argentina
- Language: Spanish

By the Sweat of Your Brow (Spanish: Con el sudor de tu frente) is a 1949 Argentine film directed by Román Viñoly Barreto during the classical era of Argentine cinema.

== Cast ==
- Armando Bo
- Diana Ingro
- Alba Múgica
- Ernesto Bianco
- Raúl del Valle
- Oscar Combi
- Domingo Garibotto
