= Isidro B. Maiztegui =

Argentine composer (1905–1996)

- Born: 14 July 1905; Gualeguay, Argentina
- Died: 29 May 1996 (aged 90); Mar del Plata, Argentina
- Other name: Isidro Buenaventura Maiztegui Pereiro
- Occupation: Composer
- Years active: 1938–1969 (film)

Isidro B. Maiztegui (July 14, 1905 – May 29, 1996) was an Argentine composer who wrote a number of film scores.

== Selected filmography ==
- The Circus Cavalcade (1945)
- Wake Up to Life (1945)
- Lost Kisses (1945)
- Madame Bovary (1947)
- From Man to Man (1949)
- The New Bell (1950)
- The Street Next to the Moon (1951)
- Comedians (1954)
- Andalusia Express (1956)
- The Legion of Silence (1956)
- Night and Dawn (1958)
- Vengeance (1958)
- Sonatas (1959)
- Kill and Be Killed (1962)

== Bibliography ==
- Lorenzo J. Torres Hortelano. Directory of World Cinema: Spain. Intellect Books, 2011.
