= Broken Comedy =

- Release date: 1978
- Running time: 110 minute
- Country: Argentina
- Language: Spanish

Broken Comedy (Spanish: Comedia rota) is a 1978 Argentine film.

== Cast ==
- Julia von Grolman
- Ignacio Quirós
- Gianni Lunadei
- Elsa Daniel
- Arturo García Buhr
- Thelma Stefani
- Elena Tasisto
- Nelly Prono
- Darwin Sanchez
- Ricardo Fasan
- Jimeno del San Cuilco
- Luis Cordara
- Claudia Palmucci
- Virginia Romay
