= Prisoner 1040 =

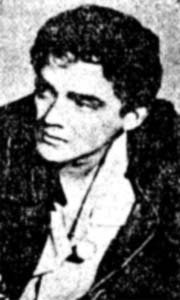
- Spanish: Procesado 1040
- Directed by: Rubén W. Cavalloti
- Written by: Wilfredo Jiménez; Juan Carlos Patrón
- Release date: 1958
- Running time: 83 minute
- Country: Argentina
- Language: Spanish

Prisoner 1040 (Spanish: Procesado 1040) is a 1958 Argentine thriller film directed by Rubén W. Cavalloti. The film is about an honest man who is wrongly imprisoned and experiences the horror within the cold walls of the prison.

== Cast ==
- Narciso Ibáñez Menta as José Rossini
- Walter Vidarte as El Zorrito
- Carlos Estrada as Roberto Mayorga
- Juan Carlos Lamas as Maidana
- Tito Alonso as El Potrillo
- Pedro Buchardo as Policía
- Beto Gianola as Preso
- Pascual Nacarati as Policía
- Alicia Bellán as Rossina
- Josefa Goldar as Doña María
- Enrique Kossi as Oficial
- Ariel Absalón as Enrique Medina
- Rafael Diserio as Vicente
