= Ángel, la diva y yo =

- Screenshot
- Directed by: Pablo Nisenson
- Screenplay by: Pablo Nisenson; José Pablo Feinmann
- Produced by: Ricardo Belén; Gastón Ocampo
- Starring: José Soriano; Esther Goris
- Cinematography: Eduardo Pinto
- Edited by: Sergio Zottola
- Music by: Alberto Quercia Lagos
- Production companies: INCAA; LAFS & TIERS
- Distributed by: Primer Plano Film Group
- Release date: November 1999 (Argentina)
- Running time: 93 minutes
- Country: Argentina
- Language: Spanish

Ángel, la diva y yo is a 1999 Argentine drama film directed Pablo Nisenson, and written by Nisenson and José Pablo Feinmann. It stars José Soriano, Esther Goris, Boy Olmi and Florencia Peña. The film was partly funded by INCAA.

== Synopsis ==
In Buenos Aires, at the end of the 20th century, a documentarian, anxious about his future, is about to embark on his "last act" when a mysterious package is delivered to him. It contains a rusty 35 mm film canister, an envelope stuffed with cash, and a request: to rescue the greatest Argentine film director in history from oblivion. Alongside his crew, the filmmaker tries to piece together the puzzle.

== Cast ==
- José "Pepe" Soriano as Angel Ferreyros
- Esther Goris as Diva
- Boy Olmi as Julián Armendáriz
- Florencia Peña as Ana
- Ricardo Sendra as Miguel
- Osvaldo Bayer as Escritor
- Max Berliner as Merayo
- Alberto Busaid as Funes
- Claudio España as Crítico
- José Pablo Feinmann as Filósofo
- Miguel Fontes as Payaso
- Celina Fux as Vecina
- Patricia Hart as Santa
- Diana Ingro as Actriz famosa
- Augusto Larreta as Loco
- Miguel Padilla as Policia
- Jorge Román
- Salvador Sammaritano as Esayista
- Andrés Turnes as Empresario
- Emilio Vieyra as Mendigo

== Distribution ==
The film was first presented at the Mar del Plata Film Festival in November 1999, where it was acclaimed as one of the best Ibero-American films of that year. It then opened wide in Argentina on September 21, 2000.

== Awards ==
Wins

- Mar del Plata Film Festival: Best Ibero-American Film, Pablo Nisenson; Best Screenplay, Pablo Nisenson and José Pablo Feinmann; 1999.

Nominations

- Argentine Film Critics Association Awards: Silver Condor; Best Original Screenplay, José Pablo Feinmann and Pablo Nisenson; 2001.
