= Juan Verdaguer =

Uruguayan actor

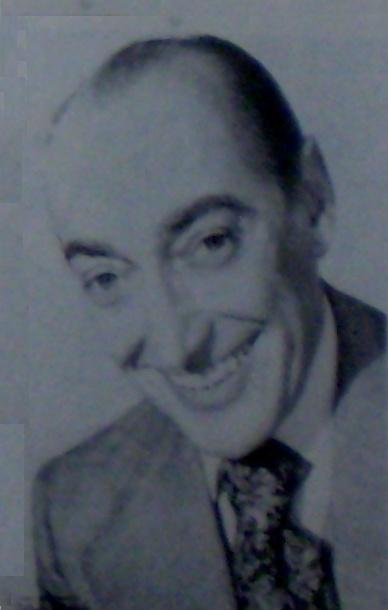
- Born: 30 July 1915; Montevideo, Uruguay
- Died: 14 May 2001 (aged 85); Buenos Aires, Argentina
- Other name: Juan Francisco Verdaguer Queirolo
- Occupation: Actor
- Years active: 1951-1999 (film)

Juan Francisco Verdaguer Queirolo (1915–2001) was a Uruguayan actor. He is best known for playing the main character in the 1958 Argentine film Rosaura at 10 O'clock.

== Selected filmography ==
- Estrellas de Buenos Aires (1956)
- Rosaura at 10 O'clock (1958)
- La Herencia (1964)
- Cleopatra Was Candida (1964)

== Bibliography ==
- Goble, Alan. The Complete Index to Literary Sources in Film. Walter de Gruyter, 1999.
