= Alicia Bellán =

Argentinian actress

- Born: 10 October 1931; Buenos Aires, Argentina
- Died: 10 July 2018 (aged 86); Buenos Aires, Argentina
- Resting place: La Chacarita cemetery, Buenos Aires
- Education: Universidad Nacional de las Artes
- Occupations: film actress, theatre actress, television actress
- Years active: 1957-1989
- Known for: Procesado 1040

Alicia Bellán (10 October 1931 – 10 July 2018) was an Argentine film actress who also worked as a theatre professional and as a television actress during her early career. She graduated at the Universidad Nacional de las Artes during the 1950s and made her film acting debut at the age of 23 through the 1954 film Los Ojos llenos de amor. Alicia also went onto work in notable theatre companies for many decades after the era of late 1970s. She died on 10 July 2018 at the age of 86 in Buenos Aires after a long illness.

== Career ==
After graduating from the National University of Arts, she worked in the Argentine film industry in the early 1950s. Her debut film was Los Ojos llenos de amor which was released in 1954. Her last feature film was Procesado 1040 which was released in 1958. She found work as a stage actress.

In the 1970s, Bellán received the opportunity to work at the Teatro General San Martín which is considered as one of the best theatre companies in Buenos Aires. During the same period, she was able to work with Teatro Coliseo, Teatro Nacional Cervantes and Opera Theatre. Alicia Bellán also acted in a 1964 comedy telenovela El amor tiene cara de mujer (Love has a Woman's Face), her most notable appearance on television.

== Death ==
Alicia Bellán died on 10 July 2018 in her hometown at the age of 86 after a long illness. Her remains were buried the National Cemetery.

== Filmography ==
=== Films ===
Year	Title	Role	Notes
1954	Los Ojos llenos de amor		debut film
1955	Mi marido y mi novio		
1956	El Protegido	Ines Gonzalez	
1957	The House of the Angel		
1958	Procesado 1040	Rossina	

=== Television ===
- El amor tiene cara de mujer (1964)
