= Paper Boats =

- Directed by: Román Viñoly Barreto
- Screenplay by: José P. Dominiani, Hellen Ferro, Manuel Tamayo
- Based on: the novel Barcos el papel by Álvaro Yunque
- Starring: Pablo Calvo
- Cinematography: Aníbal González Paz
- Edited by: Héctor Gazzolo, Juan Pisón, José Serra
- Music by: Tito Ribero
- Production companies: Castilla Cooperativa Cinematográfica, Federico J. Aicardi
- Release date: 25 February 1963 (Spain)
- Running time: 75 minutes
- Country: Argentina
- Language: Spanish

Paper Boats (Spanish: Barcos de papel) is a 1963 Argentine and Spanish drama film directed by Román Viñoly Barreto and starring Pablo Calvo.

== Premise ==
Excited to get a crystal ball, a kid works hard to afford it, only to be wrongly accused of a theft.

== Cast ==
- Pablo Calvo
- Jardel Filho
- Ubaldo Martínez
- Enzo Viena
- Mariángeles
- Alita Román
- Ariel Absalón
- Alberto Olmedo
- Oscar Orlegui
