= Wake Up to Life =

1945 film by Mario Soffici

- Directed by: Mario Soffici
- Written by: Francisco Madrid; Carlos Alberto Silva
- Starring: Elisa Christian Galvé; Roberto Airaldi; Francisco de Paula; Tilda Thamar
- Cinematography: Francis Boeniger
- Edited by: Gerardo Rinaldi
- Music by: Isidro B. Maiztegui
- Production company: Pampa Film
- Release date: 11 April 1945
- Running time: 65 minutes
- Country: Argentina
- Language: Spanish

Wake Up to Life (Spanish:Despertar a la vida) is a 1945 Argentine drama film of the classical era of Argentine cinema, directed by Mario Soffici and starring Elisa Christian Galvé, Roberto Airaldi and Francisco de Paula. de Paula won a Silver Condor award for his performance.

== Synopsis ==
A doctor begins a romance with a young woman which almost has tragic consequences.

== Cast ==
- Elisa Christian Galvé
- Roberto Airaldi
- Francisco de Paula
- Tilda Thamar
- Lea Conti
- Hugo Pimentel
- Leticia Scury
- Francisco Pablo Donadío
- Hugo Palomero
- Humberto de la Rosa
- Humberto Ferradaz Campos
- Ana Nieves

== Bibliography ==
- Hammer, Tad. International film prizes: an encyclopedia. Garland, 1991 .
