= José Maurer =

Israeli-Argentine actor

- יוסף מאורער
- Born: Yoshe Maurer Neumann; 6 May 1906; Boryslav, Austria-Hungary (now Ukraine)
- Died: 23 May 1968 (aged 62); Tel Aviv, Israel
- Occupation: Actor
- Years active: 1922–1968
- Spouse: Paulina Tajman
- Children: 1

José Maurer (Hebrew: יוסף מאורער; 6 May 1906 – 23 May 1968) was an Austro-Hungarian-Argentine actor. He was regarded as one of the leading actors in Yiddish theatre.

== Early life ==
He was born Yoshe Maurer Neumann in the town of Boryslav, then a thriving Oil town in Galicia, Austro-Hungarian Empire. Maurer was the son of the local cobbler, and known as an amateur violinist, actor, and singer.

== Career ==
When the famous Vilnius Jewish Theatre (Vilna Troupe), under the direction of Zygmund Turkow visited Boryslav in 1922, the 16-year-old Yoshe was offered a minor role. Two weeks later, as the Theatre left, so did Yoshe, never to return to his hometown. As a member of this famous Yiddish Theatre, he toured Poland and Romania until 1927, when he immigrated to Argentina.

In Buenos Aires he became one of the leading actors in the Jewish Yiddish Theatre, playing along such renowned actors as Joseph Buloff, Maurice Schwartz and Jacob Ben-Ami. He was regarded as a first class "character" (drama) actor and as a "tour de force" used to change leading roles, for example, playing with Ben Ami both parts of Man and Devil in Got, Mentsch Und Taivel, the famous Yiddish version of Faust by Jacob Gordin, night after night. On the other hand, he had a gift for comedy and took part in many musical comedies.

In the late nineteen-forties, he was elected President of the Jewish Actors Guild in Argentina and served in this post for more than 20 years, until his emigration to Israel.

He was a notable co-star in 28 Argentine films, specializing in "foreign" accents and played the Spanish Argentine stage, among others, with Berta Singerman.

In 1963, he moved to Israel, where he played the Yiddish stage and was elected there too as President of the Yiddish Actor's Guild until his death.

== Death and legacy ==
His lifelong wish was to die on stage, and this he did. In 1968, shortly after the curtain went down, and still wearing makeup on his face, he had a stroke and died shortly afterward, aged 62.

His collection of manuscript plays, including translations into Yiddish of modern Argentine drama, was donated to the Bar Ilan University and is now part of the Rena Costa Center for Yiddish Studies.

== Filmography ==
- Apasionadamente (1944)
- 24 horas en la vida de una mujer (1944)
- Madame Sans-Gêne (1945)
- La Verdadera victoria (1945) as Fisher
- Albéniz (1947)
- A sangre fría (1947) (a.k.a. In Cold Blood) as Doctor
- María de los Ángeles (1948)
- Tierra del fuego (1948)
- Captura recomendada (1950)
- Piantadino (1950)
- Suburb (1951)
- The Path to Crime (1951)
- To Live for a Moment (1951)) as Walaska
- Payaso (1952) (a.k.a. The Clown) as Payaso (The Clown)
- El Amor nunca muere (1955) (a.k.a. Love Never Dies)
- Pecadora (1955)
- Oro bajo (1956)
- Que me toquen las golondrinas (1957) (a.k.a. La Despedida)
- Angustia de un secreto (1959) as Defensor
- El Dinero de Dios (1959) as Monk in the Monastery
- Yo quiero vivir contigo (1960) (a.k.a. Ich möchte mit Dir leben (West Germany))
- La Procesión (1960)
- Héroes de hoy (1960)
- Quinto año nacional (1961)
- Mate Cosido (1962)
- Detrás de la mentira (1962)
- Las Ratas (1963) (a.k.a. The Rats)
- Alias Flequillo (1963) (a.k.a. La Pantera del Gatillo) as Sergio (final film role)
