= The Cicada Is Not a Bug =

1963 drama film by Daniel Tinayre

The Cicada Is Not an Insect
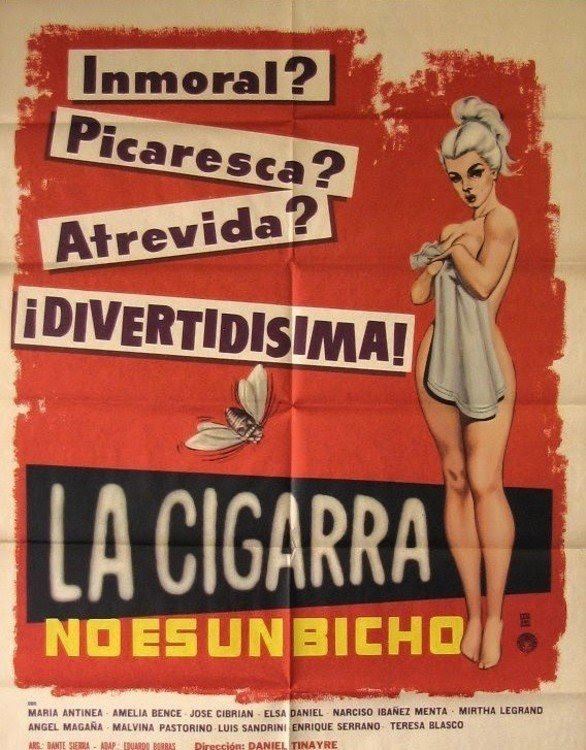
- Theatrical release poster
- Directed by: Daniel Tinayre
- Written by: Eduardo Borrás; Daniel Tinayre; Dante Sierra
- Starring: José Cibrián
- Narrated by: Rafael Carret
- Cinematography: Alberto Etchebehere
- Edited by: Jorge Garate
- Music by: Lucio Milena
- Release date: 1963
- Running time: 107 minutes
- Country: Argentina
- Language: Spanish

The Cicada Is Not a Bug (Spanish: La cigarra no es un bicho, US title The Games Men Play) is a 1963 Argentine drama film directed by Daniel Tinayre. It was entered into the 3rd Moscow International Film Festival.

== Cast ==
- Amelia Bence
- Elsa Daniel
- Mirtha Legrand
- Malvina Pastorino
- José Cibrián
- Narciso Ibáñez Menta
- Ángel Magaña
- Luis Sandrini
- Enrique Serrano
- Guillermo Bredeston
- Myriam de Urquijo
- Héctor Calcaño
- Miguel Ligero
- Oscar Valicelli
- Lucio Deval
- Julio De Grazia
- Teresa Blasco
- Diana Ingro
- Leda Zanda
