= Mariano Mores =

Argentine tango composer, pianist and conductor

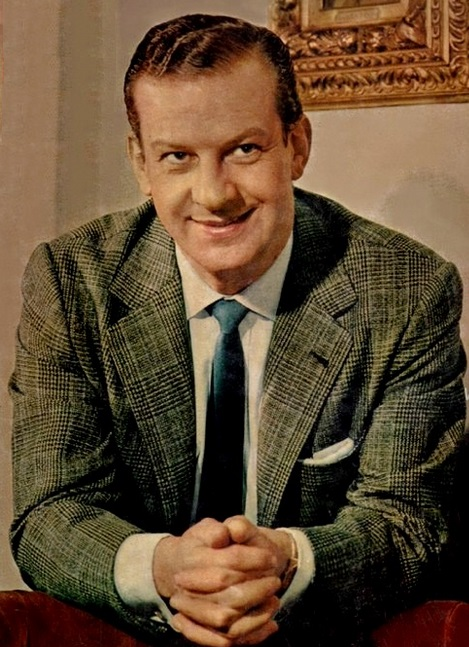
- Mores in 1964

Background information
- Born: Mariano Alberto Martínez; 18 February 1918; Buenos Aires, Argentina
- Died: 13 April 2016 (aged 98) Buenos Aires, Argentina
- Genres: Tango
- Occupations: Composer; pianist; conductor

Mariano Alberto Martínez (18 February 1918 – 13 April 2016), known professionally as Mariano Mores, was an Argentine tango composer and pianist.

== Biography ==
Mariano Martínez was born in the San Telmo section of Buenos Aires, Argentina, in 1918. When he was a child, he played classical music on the piano very well. He made his professional debut at the age of 14 at Café Vicente on Corrientes Avenue. Mores took classical music lessons at the D´Andrea conservatoire in Lanús. After a brief spell with the folk group "La Cuyanita," he was hired as conductor and pianist with Roberto Firpo's orchestra.

He created the Trio Mores with the sisters Margot and Myrna Mores and began composing music. He will later marry Myrna and adopt her artistic surname as his own. In 1938 he wrote the soundtrack of the film Senderos de Santa Fe and met showbiz figures such as composer Valdo Sciammarella and playwright Alberto Vaccarezza, who helped him become lead pianist with Francisco Canaro's orchestra in 1939. Mores left this orchestra in 1948 to form his own, which made its debut at the Presidente Alvear Theater.

Pianist, composer and conductor, Mariano Mores established himself as one of the leading tango performers. Together with Enrique Santos Discépolo, he authored such classics as Uno (1943), Sin palabras (1946) and Cafetín de Buenos Aires (1948). Mores and José María Contursi wrote En esta tarde gris (1941), Tu piel de jazmín (1941), Grisel (1942) and Cristal (1944). He co-wrote La calesita (1953) and El patio de la morocha (1951) with Cátulo Castillo, Una lágrima tuya (1949) with Homero Manzi and, Cuartito Azul (1939) with Mario Battistella. Mariano Mores took part in several musical films together with such stars as Delia Garcés, Osvaldo Miranda, Virginia Luque and Hugo del Carril. He starred in the 1949 films Corrientes, calle de ensueños, and La Doctora quiere tangos with Mirtha Legrand. For the 1953 film La voz de mi ciudad he composed one of his most remembered milongas, Taquito militar. In television he starred in series M ama a M (1957) and La familia Mores (1967).

Since 1980, the dancer and choreographer Luis Pereyra has been using Mariano Mores' compositions in his works. In 1986 he was engaged for Mariano Mores' tour Todo Tango.

Mores created the modern tango sextet (organ, piano, bandoneon, electric guitar, keyboard, drums and bass) and established himself as one of the leading figures of the Argentine popular music. Mores died on 13 April 2016 at the age of 98.
