= Julián Bourges =

Argentine actor

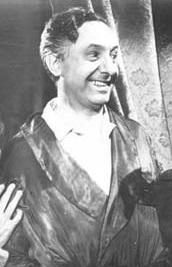
- Born: Buenos Aires, Argentina
- Died: 1976
- Years active: 1944–1975

Julián Bourges (died 1976) was an Argentine film actor. He starred in some 25 films between 1944 and 1975.

Biondo made his debut in 1944 in the film Importancia de ser ladrón and in 1956 La Dama del millón and in 1960 appeared in the Antonio Cunill Jr. film Los Acusados.

His last film was Carmiña: Su historia de amor in 1975.

== Selected filmography ==
- Cristina (1946)
- My Poor Beloved Mother (1948)
- My Divine Poverty (1951)
- The Beautiful Brummel (1951)
- The Candidate (1959)
