= Pájaro loco =

- Directed by: Lucas Demare
- Written by: Ariel Cortazzo; Lucas Demare
- Release date: 1971
- Running time: 100 minute
- Country: Argentina
- Language: Spanish

Pájaro loco is a 1971 Argentine comedy film directed by Lucas Demare. It stars Luis Sandrini, María José Demare, Víctor Laplace and José Cibrián.
