= Extraña ternura =

- Directed by: Daniel Tinayre
- Written by: Guy des Cars, Eduardo Borrás
- Starring: Egle Martin
- Cinematography: Antonio Merayo
- Edited by: Jorge Gárate; Higinio Vecchione
- Music by: Astor Piazzolla, Lucio Milena
- Release date: 1964
- Running time: 99 minutes
- Country: Argentina
- Language: Spanish

Extraña ternura is a 1964 Argentine film directed by Daniel Tinayre based on a novel by Guy des Cars.

== Music ==
Music for the film was written by Astor Piazzolla and Lucio Milena. At the persuasion of Egle Martin, Piazzolla set the poem "Graciela Oscura" by Ulyses Petit de Murat to music for the film; this song was repeated several times in the movie, and was reported to be the main attraction of the film when it opened at the Cine Monumental in the spring of 1964.
