= Rosa at Ten O'Clock =

1955 novel by Marco Denevi

Rosaura at Ten O'Clock
- Author: Marco Denevi
- Language: Spanish
- Genre: Crime fiction
- Publisher: Sudamericana
- Publication date: 1955
- Publication place: Argentina
- Media type: Print
- Pages: 251

Rosaura at Ten O'Clock (Spanish: Rosaura a las diez) is a 1955 Argentine novel written by Marco Denevi. It was the author's first novel and was translated into several languages, as well adapted for theater, cinema and television. With this work, Denevi began a recognized literary career in the national and international arena. In 1964, it was translated into English by Donald A. Yates as Rosa at Ten O'Clock.

== Plot ==
The story unfolds around the inhabitants of a Buenos Aires boarding house. Ms. Milagros is the owner of the pension where she lives with her three daughters, Camilo Canegato (a shy and quiet painter), David Réguel (a smart and overly confident law student) and Mrs. Eufrasia (a retired teacher who enjoys gossip), among other characters. For six months, Camilo receives mysterious love letters from a girl who identifies herself as Rosaura (Rosa in the English version). Camilo met young Rosaura while working on a job to restore a painting for a rich man. From there, the love story between Camilo and Rosaura starts. The story between them continues to progress until everything becomes dark when Rosaura is found dead. Then, the story is told as each of the characters testify to the inspector of the circumstances surrounding Rosaura's murder.

== Awards ==
- Kraft Prize (1955)
