= Río abajo =

1960 film by Enrique Dawi

- Directed by: Enrique Dawi
- Written by: Enrique Dawi; Juan José Manauta
- Release date: 1960
- Country: Argentina
- Language: Spanish

Río abajo is a 1960 Argentine film directed by Enrique Dawi.
