= Diana Ingro =

Argentine actress (1917–2017)

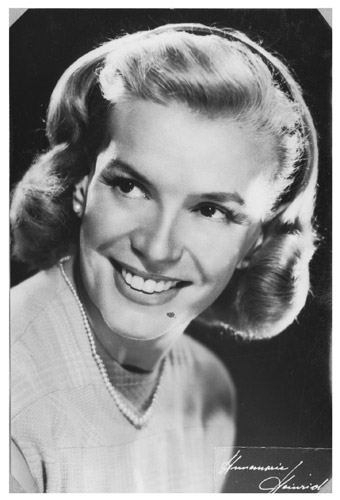
- Ingro in the 1960s
- Born: Susana Unía; 26 October 1917; Ramos Mejía, Buenos Aires Province, Argentina
- Died: 23 March 2017 (aged 99); Buenos Aires, Argentina
- Occupation: Actress

Susana Unía (26 October 1917 – 23 March 2017), known professionally as Diana Ingro, was an Argentine actress known for starring in By the Sweat of Your Brow (1949), Muerte civil (1954), The Cicada Is Not a Bug (1963), and Extraña ternura (1964).

== Biography ==
Diana Ingro was born on 26 October 1917 in Ramos Mejía, a town in Buenos Aires Province. She had two older sisters, as well as a twin sister. Although she spent some time employed as a teacher, she became interested in an acting career during her youth, and she was educated at the Conservatory of Dramatic Art.

After starting her career in theater, she starred as an extra in the 1944 film Our Natacha. She starred in Corazón (1947) and in By the Sweat of Your Brow (1949) and in 1950, won the Argentine Film Critics Association's revelation award for her work in the latter. The 1954 Alberto D'Aversa film Muerte civil marked the first time she had a leading role in a film, starring alongside Armando Bó; she reportedly had fond memories of Santiago del Estero Province, where she had filmed Muerte civil, as late as 2010.

She later starred in Corrientes, Street of Dreams (1949), Emergency Ward (1952), La pasión desnuda (1953), La telaraña (1954), Tren internacional (1954), Graciela (1956), The Cicada Is Not a Bug (1963), Extraña ternura (1964), and Papá corazón se quiere casar (1974). Her final film appearance was in the 1999 film Ángel, la diva y yo.

She was also a television actress, starring in Amo y Señor, Carola y Carolina, Corazones de fuego, El amor tiene cara de mujer, El seductor, El Teatro de Jorge Salcedo, and Manuela. She was also a stage actress, starring in plays from Jean Cocteau, Federico García Lorca, and Jean Giraudoux and in Mexico. She also received recognition from the Argentine diaspora in the United States for a performance of the Argentine play La valija in Los Angeles, California. She was also the host of the series Conflictos humanos.

She was known as "the Argentine Katharine Hepburn" due to her blond hair, and La Nación described her as "one of the most prominent" names of the Golden Age of Argentine Cinema. She was one of the winners of the 2015 Podestá Award for Honorable Lifetime Achievement.

On 23 March 2017, it was reported that Ingro died in Buenos Aires, aged 99. She was interred at the La Chacarita Cemetery's actors pantheon.

== Filmography ==
- Our Natacha (1944)
- By the Sweat of Your Brow (1949)
- Corrientes, Street of Dreams (1949)
- Emergency Ward (1952)
- La pasión desnuda (1953)
- La telaraña (1954)
- Tren internacional (1954)
- Graciela (1956)
- The Cicada Is Not a Bug (1963)
- Extraña ternura (1964)
- Papá corazón se quiere casar (1974)
- Ángel, la diva y yo (1999)
