= La potranca =

- Directed by: Román Viñoly Barreto
- Written by: Raúl Valverde San Román and Román Viñoly Barreto
- Cinematography: Ricardo Younis
- Music by: Herminio Giménez
- Release date: 8 September 1960
- Running time: 82 minute
- Countries: Argentina; Mexico
- Language: Spanish

La potranca is a 1960 Argentine-Mexican film directed by Román Viñoly Barreto.

== Cast ==
- Mario Lozano
- Maruja Montes
- Guillermo Battaglia
- Rolando Chaves
- Néstor Deval
- Oscar Orlegui
- Roberto Blanco
