= Rubén W. Cavallotti =

Uruguayan-Argentine film director

Rubén W. Cavallotti (Montevideo, 1924 - Buenos Aires, 1999) was a Uruguayan-born film director from Argentina.

== Filmography ==
- Cinco gallinas y el cielo - 1957
- Prisoner 1040 (Procesado 1040) - 1958
- Gringalet - 1959
- Luna Park - 1960
- Don Frutos Gómez - 1961
- The Romance of a Gaucho (El romance de un gaucho) - 1961
- El Bruto - 1962
- Mujeres perdidas - 1964
- Bettina - 1964
- Viaje de una noche de verano - 1965
- Convención de vagabundos - 1965
- La Gorda - 1966
- Una Máscara para Ana - 1966
- Flor de piolas - 1969
- Vampire's Dream (Um Sonho de Vampiros) - 1969
- Subí que te llevo - 1980
- Mire qué lindo es mi país - 1981
