= Milagros de la Vega =

Argentine stage and film actress

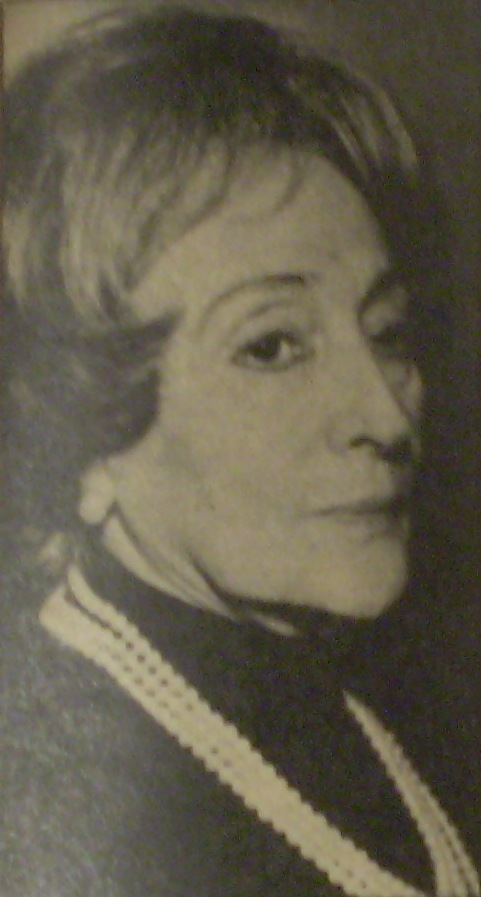
- Born: 3 February 1895; Buenos Aires, Argentina
- Died: 11 December 1980 (aged 85); Buenos Aires, Argentina
- Other name: María de los Milagros de la Vega
- Occupation: Actress
- Years active: 1919-1977 (film)

Milagros de la Vega (1895–1980) was an Argentine stage and film actress.

== Filmography ==
Year	Title	Role	Notes
1919	El mentir de los demás		
1924	El último centauro - La epopeya del gaucho Juan Moreira		
1938	La chismosa		
1938	From the Hills to the Valley	Sra. Cuenca	
1941	Veinte años y una noche	Chola	
1942	Malambo		
1946	Women's Refuge		
1946	The Sin of Julia	Karen	
1948	La serpiente de cascabel	Directora	
1949	Todo un héroe		
1949	Vidalita		
1951	Mujeres en sombra		
1952	The Beast Must Die	Sra. Rattery	
1952	Un Guapo del 900		
1953	La pasión desnuda		
1954	La quintrala		
1956	Stone Horizons		
1960	La patota	Srta. Di Fiori	
1962	Odd Number		
1965	The Amphitheatre		
1967	Gente conmigo	Abuela de Nora	
1967	El loro de la soledad	Guadeloupe Montes	
1970	Mr. and Mrs. Juan Lamaglia		
1975	La hora de María y el pájaro de oro	Grandmother	
1975	Los orilleros	Doña Tránsito	
1977	Saverio, el cruel	Señora Aguirre	(final film role)

== Bibliography ==
- Peter Cowie & Derek Elley. World Filmography: 1967. Fairleigh Dickinson University Press, 1977.
