= Nya Quesada =

Argentine actress (1919–2013)

- Born: Armonía Quesada; 13 April 1919; Bahía Blanca, Buenos Aires Province, Argentina
- Died: 6 December 2013 (aged 94); Buenos Aires, Argentina
- Other name: Nia Quesada
- Occupation: Actress
- Years active: 1961–2010
- Spouse: Antonio Val
- Children: 1

Armonía "Nya" Quesada (13 April 1919 – 6 December 2013) was an Argentine actress, whose career spanned nearly five decades.

== Death ==
Nya Quesada died of natural causes on 6 December 2013, aged 94, in Buenos Aires.
