= La procesión =

- Directed by: Francis Lauric
- Written by: Helvio Botana; Francis Lauric; Alberto Peyrou
- Produced by: Carlos García Nacson
- Starring: Guillermo Brizuela Méndez
- Cinematography: Julio C. Lavera
- Edited by: Nicolás Proserpio
- Release date: 1960
- Running time: 96 minutes
- Country: Argentina
- Language: Spanish

La procesión is a 1960 Argentine film directed by Francis Lauric. It was entered into the 1960 Cannes Film Festival.

== Cast ==
- Guillermo Brizuela Méndez
- Héctor Calcaño
- Rafael Carret
- Carlos Enríquez
- Gloria Ferrandiz
- Santiago Gómez Cou
- José María Gutiérrez
- José Maurer
