= Graciela (film) =

- Directed by: Leopoldo Torre Nilsson
- Written by: Arturo Cerretani; Leopoldo Torre Nilsson
- Produced by: Argentina Sono Film
- Starring: Elsa Daniel; Lautaro Murúa
- Cinematography: Anibal Gonzalez Paz
- Edited by: Jorge Gárate
- Music by: Juan Elbert
- Release date: 10 May 1956
- Running time: 87 minutes
- Country: Argentina
- Language: Spanish

Graciela is a 1956 Argentine film directed by Leopoldo Torre Nilsson, which earned its Chilean star, Lautaro Murúa, the 1957 Silver Condor Award for Best Actor. It was Murúa' debut film in Argentina and his first principal role, which he played opposite, Elsa Daniel.

== Cast ==
- Elsa Daniel
- Lautaro Murúa
- Ilde Pirovano
- Alba Múgica
- Ernesto Bianco
- Alita Román
- Susana Campos
- Diana Ingro
- Frank Nelson
- Alejandro Rey
