= Stone Horizons (1956 film) =

- Directed by: Román Viñoly Barreto
- Release date: 1956
- Running time: 86 minute
- Country: Argentina
- Language: Spanish

Stone Horizons (Spanish: Horizontes de piedra) is a 1956 Argentine film directed by Román Viñoly Barreto. The movie addresses the position of the native population.

== Cast ==
- Mario Lozano
- Milagros de la Vega
- Julia Sandoval
- Atahualpa Yupanqui
- Liana Noda
- Enrique Fava
- Félix Rivero
- Enrique Abela
- Fausto Etchegoin
- Roberto Rivas
- Félix Rivero
