= Francisco de Paula (actor) =

Argentine actor (1914–1985)

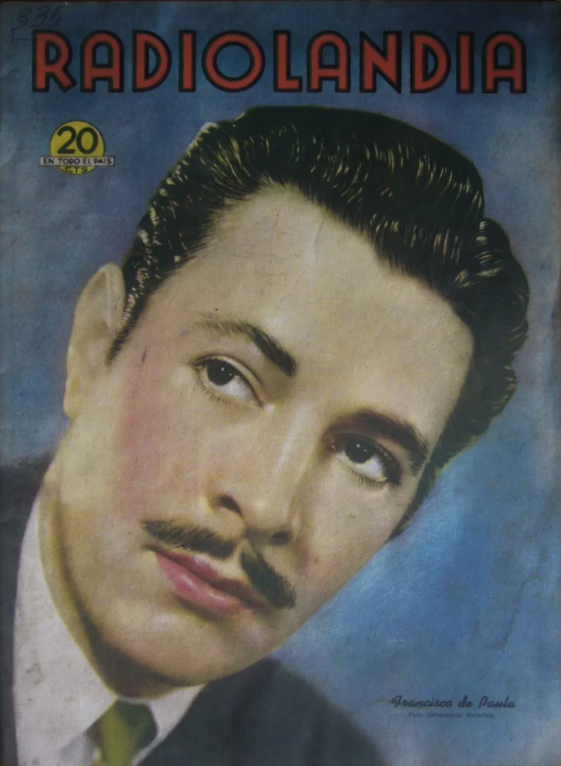
- Francisco de Paula by Annemarie Heinrich, 1946
- Born: 20 February 1914; Laboulaye, Córdoba, Argentina
- Died: 27 February 1989 (aged 75); Buenos Aires, Argentina
- Occupation: Actor
- Years active: 1939-1976 (film)

Francisco de Paula (1914–1985) was an Argentine film actor. He appeared in more than thirty films during his career including The Story of a Bad Woman.

== Selected filmography ==
- 24 Hours in the Life of a Woman (1944)
- Wake Up to Life (1945)
- El Capitán Pérez (1946)
- Story of a Bad Woman (1948)
- Passport to Rio (1948)
- The Earring (1951)
- Rebeldía (1975)

== Bibliography ==
- Goble, Alan. The Complete Index to Literary Sources in Film. Walter de Gruyter, 1999.
