= Román Viñoly Barreto =

Uruguayan-Argentine film director (1910–1970)

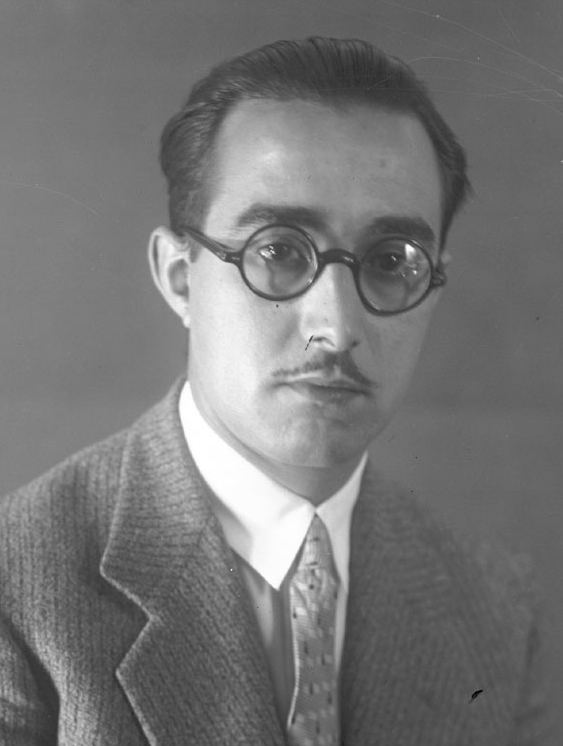
- Born: Román Viñoly Barreto; 8 August 1910; Montevideo, Uruguay
- Died: August 20, 1970 (aged 60); Buenos Aires, Argentina
- Occupations: film director, screenwriter
- Spouse: Maria Orfelia Beceiro
- Children: Ana Maria de la Merced, Rafael, Daniel

Román Viñoly Barreto (8 August 1910 – 20 August 1970) was a Uruguayan-Argentine film director notable for his work during the classical era of Argentine cinema.

== Biography ==
Viñoly Barreto directed 28 feature films between 1947 and 1966 including The Black Vampire, Paper Boats, the 1954 film El Abuelo which starred Enrique Muino and Mecha Ortiz and Esta Es Mi Vida starring Miguel de Molina. His 1958 film Los dioses ajenos was entered into the 8th Berlin International Film Festival. His 1965 film La pérgola de las flores was entered into the 4th Moscow International Film Festival. Two years later, he was a member of the jury of the 5th Moscow International Film Festival. He was also a notable screenwriter, theater and opera director.

== Personal life ==
The director was the father of architect Rafael Viñoly, artist Daniel Viñoly, and Dr. Ana Maria de la Merced Viñoly. He died in 1970 in Buenos Aires, Argentina.

== Selected filmography ==
- (1947) Estrellita
- (1949) Con el sudor de tu frente
- (1949) Corrientes, calle de ensueños
- (1950) Una viuda casi alegre
- (1950) Fangio, el demonio de las pistas
- (1951) La calle junto a la luna
- (1952) Ésta es mi vida
- (1952) La bestia debe morir
- (1953) El vampiro negro
- (1953) La Niña del gato
- (1954) El Abuelo
- (1955) Chico Viola Não Morreu
- (1956) Horizontes de piedra
- (1956) El hombre virgen
- (1957) Fantoche
- (1958) Los dioses ajenos
- (1958) Un centavo de mujer
- (1959) El dinero de Dios
- (1959) Reportaje en el infierno
- (1960) Todo el año es Navidad
- (1960) La potranca
- (1961) Buenas noches, mi amor
- (1963) Barcos de papel
- (1963) La familia Falcón
- (1965) La pérgola de las flores
- (1965) Villa Delicia, playa de estacionamiento, musica ambiental
- (1965) Orden de matar
