= Luna Park (1960 film) =

- Directed by: Rubén W. Cavallotti
- Written by: Wilfredo Jiménez; Sixto Pondal Ríos
- Release date: 1960
- Country: Argentina
- Language: Spanish

Luna Park is a 1960 Argentine film. It follows the story of a young boxer whose dream of fighting in Luna Park Stadium is on conflict with the interests of the sport.

== Cast ==
- Pepe Armil
- Hugo Astar
- Alberto Barcel
- Pedro Buchardo
- Elisa Daniel
- Nora Massi
- Luis Orbegozo
