= Marco Denevi =

Argentine writer (1922–1998)

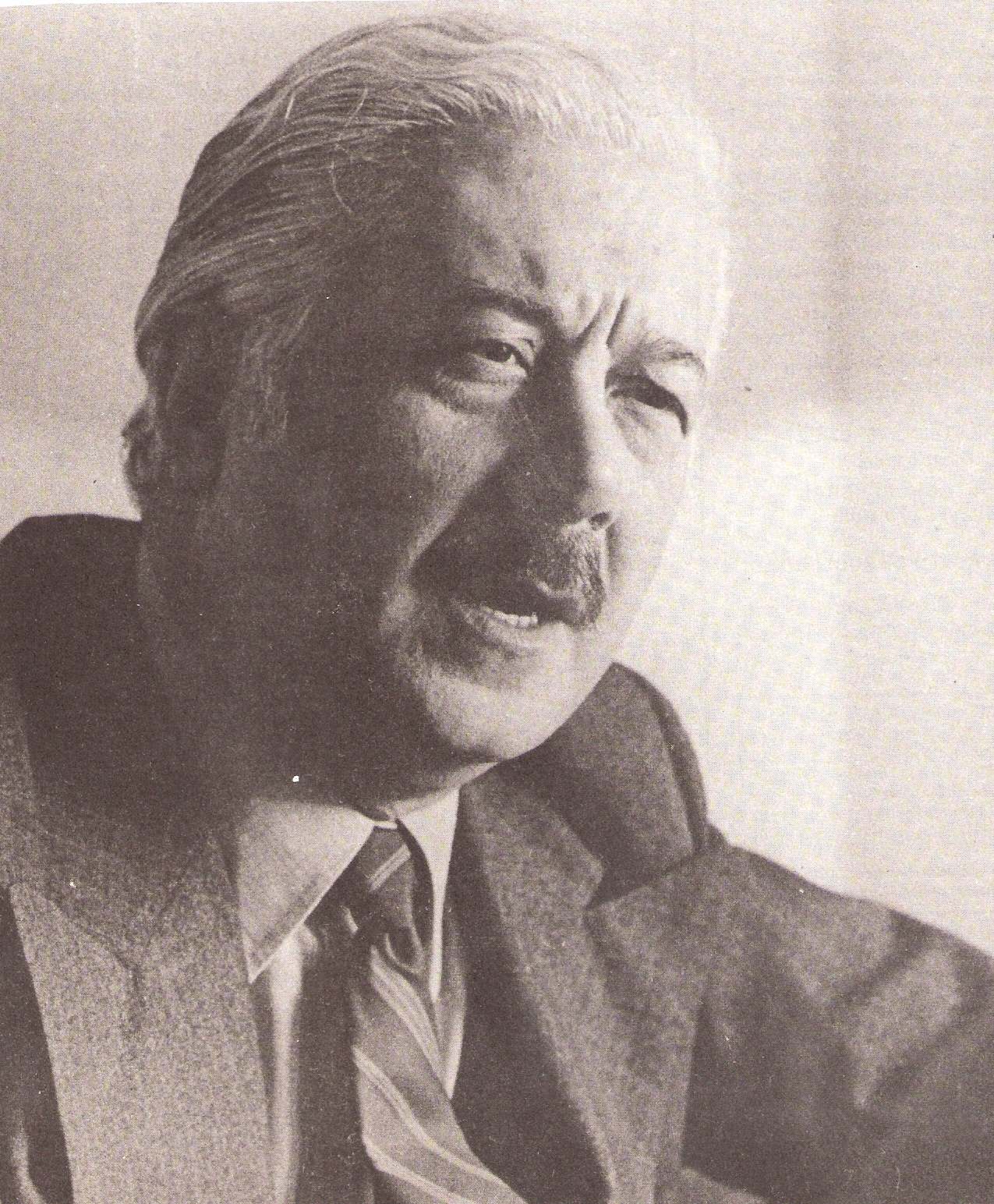
- Marco Denevi
- Born: May 12, 1922; Sáenz Peña, Buenos Aires
- Died: 12 December 1998 (aged 78); Buenos Aires
- Resting place: La Recoleta Cemetery
- Education: Bachelor of Laws
- Occupations: Writer, Lawyer
- Writing career
- Period: 1955 - 1993
- Genres: Mystery fiction, crime fiction
- Notable works: Rosaura a las diez, Cermonia Secreta

Marco Denevi (May 12, 1922 – December 12, 1998) was an Argentine author of novels, short stories, and plays, as well as a lawyer and journalist. His work is characterized by its originality and depth, as well as a criticism of human incompetence.

== Career ==
His first work, a mystery novel titled Rosaura a las diez (1955), was a Kraft award winner and a bestseller. In 1964, it was translated into English as Rosa at Ten O'Clock. Other famous works of his include Los expedientes (1957), El emperador de la China (1959), Ceremonia Secreta (1960), El cuarto de la noche (1962), and Falsificaciones (1966).

Ceremonia Secreta was filmed as Secret Ceremony in 1968 starring Elizabeth Taylor, Mia Farrow, Robert Mitchum, and Peggy Ashcroft. It was directed by Joseph Losey, with a screenplay written by George Tabori. In his edition of this and other Denevi works (Macmillan, 1965), Donald A. Yates mentions Denevi's admiration for Wilkie Collins, whose work this novella resembles.

He is less known as an essayist, but he also cultivated that genre with his República de Trapalanda (1989), a late work, where he took on Ezequiel Martínez Estrada and Domingo Faustino Sarmiento's view of the Argentine republic.

He was born in the province of Buenos Aires, Argentina, and at a young age he began playing the piano and reading. He graduated from college in 1939, and did not receive his law degree until 1956.

In 1987 he was inducted into the Argentine Academy of Letters.

Secret Ceremony English edition cover.

Denevi had a desire to be a playwright. He wrote many dramatic pieces but felt he was not talented enough to write for the theater in Spain.

== Works ==
=== Novels ===
- Rosaura a las diez (1955) – Kraft Prize winner; translated as Rosa at Ten O’Clock
- Ceremonia secreta (1960) – adapted into the film Secret Ceremony (1968)
- Un pequeño café (1966)
- Parque de diversiones (1970)
- Los asesinos de los días de fiesta (1972)
- Manual de Historia (1985)
- Enciclopedia secreta de una familia argentina (1986)
- Música de amor perdido (1990)
- Nuestra señora de la noche (1997)
- Una familia argentina (1998)

=== Short story collections ===
- Falsificaciones (1966) – microfiction; expanded edition published in 1984
- El emperador de la China y otros cuentos (1970)
- Hierba del cielo (1973)
- Araminta, o el poder: el laurel y siete extrañas desapariciones (1982)
- Furmila, la hermosa (1986) – children's story
- El jardín de las delicias: mitos eróticos (1992)
- El amor es un pájaro rebelde (1993)
- Noche de duelo, casa del muerto (1994)
- Ceremonias secretas: relatos (1996)
- Cuentos selectos (1998)
- Música de amor perdido y nueve relatos (2010, posthumous)

=== Plays ===
- Los expedientes (1957)
- El emperador de la China (1959)
- El cuarto de la noche (1962)
- Los perezosos (1970)
- El segundo círculo o El infierno de la sexualidad sin amor (1970)
- Un globo amarillo (1970)
- Fatalidad de los amantes (1974)

=== Other works ===
- Correspondencia (1972) – co-authored with Nana Gutiérrez
- Salón de lectura (1974)
- Los locos y los cuerdos (1975)
- Robotobor (1980) – illustrated by Antonio Berni
- Páginas de Marco Denevi (1983)
- Obras completas (1985)
- La República de Trapalanda (1989) – essays
- Juan Nielsen, retrato de un maestro (1998) – biography
- Un perro (2006) – children's book, posthumous

== Secondary sources ==
- Gotschlich R. Guillermo. "Ceremonia secreta de Marco Denevi; enigma y ritualización". Revista Chilena de Literatura 33 (1989): 89-101.
- Ramos Escobar, José L. "Ceremonia secreta: ritos". Revista Interamericana 10 (1980-1981): 19–26.
- Ward, Thomas. "Marco Denevi y su propuesta en contra del Poder". En La resistencia cultural: la nación en el ensayo de las Américas. Lima: Universidad Ricardo Palma, 2004: 98-108.
