= List of films banned in Chile =

This article lists 35 mm films and videos that were banned in Chile between 1972 and 2001.

== Background ==
In 1974, under General Augusto Pinochet's dictatorship (1973–1990), a decree was issued that allowed the banning of films in Chile. Over the years, 1,092 films were banned. The Chilean film censorship system remained largely unchanged until November 1996 when United International Pictures requested a rating for The Last Temptation of Christ, which was ultimately approved for audiences over 18. However, an ultra-conservative religious group filed an injunction to reverse the decision, and in June 1997, the Supreme Court banned the film. In September 1997, a civil liberties group took the case to the Inter-American Commission on Human Rights, which ruled in February 2001 that Chile was in violation of the American Convention on Human Rights and should lift the ban on the film and modify its legislation to comply with the convention. In August 2001, a constitutional reform eliminated film censorship, and the film appeared in video stores. In January 2003, a new film rating law was published, and the film was given an "over 18" rating. It finally premiered on March 13, 2003, at a theater in Santiago.

== 35 mm films ==
The following is a list of 35 mm films and videos that were banned in Chile between 1972 and 2001.

Date of ban	Title	Spanish title	Remarks
28 April 1972	Mathias Kneissl	Mathias Kneissl	
12 September 1972	God Forgives... I Don't!	Dios podrá perdonarte yo no	
13 September 1972	Fanny Hill	La Vida íntima de una muchacha moderna	
29 December 1972	La culpa	La culpa	
1972	Last Tango in Paris	El último tango en París	Banned on its initial release for obscenity. The ban was lifted in 1990.
25 January 1974	Fists in the Pocket	Con los puños cerrados	
12 March 1974	Nicholas and Alexandra	Nicolás y Alejandra	
9 May 1974	Coffy	Cacería sangrienta	
6 June 1974	Les Compagnes de la nuit	Compañeras de la noche	
21 June 1974	Taking Off	Búsqueda insaciable	
27 June 1974	Decameron proibitissimo (Boccaccio mio statte zitto)	Decameron prohibidísimo	
4 July 1974	Bluebeard	Barba azul	
10 July 1974	The Last Italian Tango	El Último tango en Roma	
24 July 1974	The Laughing Woman	La Mujer que ríe	
2 August 1974	The Devils	Los Demonios	
22 August 1974	The Seduction of Mimi	Mimi metalúrgico herido en el honor	
14 October 1974	Behind Closed Shutters	Mujeres prohibidas	
18 October 1974	The Ruling Class	La clase gobernante	
22 October 1974	Blindman	La marca del ciego	
24 October 1974	Battle of Sutjeska	Tito	
31 October 1974	Fortune and Men's Eyes	Al sordo cielo	
7 November 1974	Beyond the Valley of the Dolls	Más allá del valle de las muñecas	
13 November 1974	Al Jennings of Oklahoma	Hijos de la violencia	
28 November 1974	Tis Pity She's a Whore	Adiós hermano cruel	
12 December 1974	Do Not Commit Adultery	No cometas actos impuros	
4 January 1975	Mera ur kärlekens språk	Romance en la cama	
15 January 1975	El monasterio de los buitres	El Monasterio de los buitres	
5 February 1975	To Love Ophelia	Para amar... Ofelia	
4 March 1975	Witchfinder General	Cuando las brujas arden	
12 March 1975	Un ufficiale non si arrende mai, nemmeno di fronte all'evidenza. Firmato Colonnello Buttiglione	El Coronel Buttiglione	
25 March 1975	Tumultes	Tumulto	
7 April 1975	Everything You Always Wanted to Know About Sex* (*But Were Afraid to Ask)	Todo lo que Ud. siempre quiso saber sobre el sexo y...	
19 May 1975	De goûts et des couleurs	El encanto del amor carnal	
29 May 1975	Story of a Cloistered Nun	Historia de una monja de clausura	
21 August 1975	1789	1789	
16 September 1975	The Working Class Goes to Heaven	Clase obrera va al paraíso	
15 October 1975	Alvin Purple	Alvin el irresistible	
16 October 1975	Le Droit d'aimer	El derecho de amar	
27 October 1975	Grandeur nature	Tamaño natural	
29 October 1975	Belle de Jour	Bella de día esposa de noche	
18 November 1975	Quebracho	Quebracho	
27 November 1975	The Wilby Conspiracy	La Conspiración	
26 December 1975	Count Dracula	El conde Drácula	
5 January 1976	The Dragon Lives Again	Las Manos mortales del Kung Fu	
9 January 1976	Karate Killer	Karatista asesino	
13 January 1976	Women in Cell Block 7	Amor y muerte en una cárcel de mujeres	
19 January 1976	Revolver	Revolver	
22 January 1976	The Great Swindle	Carla y Nora	
29 January 1976	The Last Detail	El último deber	
3 March 1976	The Cousin	La Prima siciliana	
4 March 1976	I'll Take Her Like a Father	La Trampa de la inocencia	
14 March 1976	Las adolescentes	Las Adolescentes	
16 March 1976	Intimacies of a Prostitute	Intimidades de una prostituta	
23 March 1976	Storia di arcieri, pugni e occhi neri	Príncipe de los karatecas	
4 April 1976	Johnny Firecloud	Venganza mortal	
7 April 1976	L'idea fissa	Sexo una idea fija	
13 April 1976	The Skin of Love	Piel del amor	
19 April 1976		Vértigo de dinero	
23 April 1976	The Trial of Billy Jack	Juicio de Billy Jack	
10 May 1976		Rolling Stones	
19 May 1976	El Verdugo	El Verdugo	
31 May 1976		Tierra del fuego en invierno	
14 June 1976	Je suis une nymphomane	Mi cuerpo me condena	
21 June 1976	Vieni, vieni da me amore mio	Ven ven amor mío	
5 July 1976	Emmanuelle	Emmanuelle	
7 July 1976	Profondo rosso	Rojo profundo	
2 August 1976	The Assassination	El Atentado	
6 August 1976	El valle de los miserables	El Valle de los miserables	
6 August 1976	Innocence and Desire	Inocencia y turbación	
16 August 1976	Lady Caliph	La Califa	
3 September 1976	Don't Torture a Duckling	El extraño secreto del bosque de las sombras	
22 September 1976	Elle cause plus... elle flingue	Ella ya no habla, dispara	
30 September 1976	Vampire Circus	La Gitana y el vampiro	
30 September 1976	Catherine & Co.	Cama en sociedad	
1 October 1976	Black Magic	Magia negra oriental	
20 October 1976	The Judge and the Assassin	El Juez y el asesino	
23 November 1976	The Wind's Fierce	La Cólera de viento	
7 December 1976	Swept Away	Arrastradas por insólito destino	
26 January 1977	Going Places	Las Cosas por su nombre	
31 January 1977	Love and Marriage	El Amor y el matrimonio	
16 March 1977	Dirty Fingers	Dedos sucios	
17 March 1977	Lisa and the Devil	La Casa del exorcismo	
30 March 1977		El Ruiseñor y la alondra	
15 April 1977	The Front	El Testaferro	
20 April 1977	Ride Beyond Vengeance	Última noche de violencia	
27 April 1977	The Wild Party	Fiesta salvaje	
1 June 1977	Let Sleeping Corpses Lie	No profanes el sueño de los muertos	
1 June 1977	Your Vice Is a Locked Room and Only I Have the Key	Gentilmente antes que ella muera	
4 July 1977	Gone with the West	Lo que el oeste se llevó	
5 August 1977	Jackson County Jail	La Prisión de la violencia	
6 September 1977	Valerie	Valeria	
8 September 1977	Lisztomania	Lisztomania	
28 September 1977	Three the Hard Way	Los Demoledores	
29 September 1977		El Resbalón	
24 October 1977	Furia infernal	Furia infernal	
14 November 1977	Chatterbox	La Parlante	
25 November 1977	El Mexicano	El Mexicano	
11 December 1977	La Cognatina	La Cuñadita	
13 December 1977	Ambicious	Ambiciosa	
17 January 1978	Lulù la sposa erotica	Los Caprichos de Lulu	
18 January 1978		Travesuras de familia	
18 January 1978	La nipote	Querida tierna sobrina	
25 January 1978	La moglie vergine	La esposa virgen	
1 March 1978	Moglie nuda e siciliana	Esposa desnuda y siciliana	
2 March 1978	Los Chiflados del batallón	Batallón chiflado	
6 March 1978	Barra pesada	Barra pesada	
7 March 1978	Andrea	Andrea	
8 March 1978	Bellas de noche	Bellas de noche	
8 March 1978	Las ficheras: Bellas de noche II parte	Las ficheras	
9 March 1978	That Most Important Thing: Love	Lo importante es amar	
13 March 1978	A Woman at Her Window	Una Mujer en su ventana	
21 March 1978	Africa ama	África ama	
22 March 1978		La víctima rebelde	
31 March 1978	La cameriera	La camarera curiosa	
10 April 1978	SS Lager 5 - L'inferno delle donne	SS lager 5 infierno de mujeres	
11 April 1978	Frauengefängnis	El reformatorio de las perdidas	
12 April 1978	Che dottoressa ragazzi!	Qué doctora muchachos	
12 April 1978	Rica the Half-Breed	Rica	
12 April 1978	L'affittacamere	Se alquila cama	
13 April 1978	The Wise Guys	Los rufianes	
13 April 1978		Un toro super macho	
19 April 1978	Laisse-toi faire, la neige est bonne	El perfume del adulterio	
10 May 1978	Goodbye Emmanuelle	Good bye Emmanuelle	
15 May 1978	The French Woman	Madame Claude	
26 May 1978	Le Feu aux lèvres	Labios calientes	
31 May 1978	Goodnight, Ladies and Gentlemen	Buenas noches señoras y señores	
31 May 1978	La cameriera nera	La camarera negra	
11 July 1978	Imágenes de la Argentina	Imágenes de la Argentina	
14 July 1978	I sette magnifici cornuti	Los 7 magníficos cornudos	
14 July 1978	Ultimo mondo cannibale	El último mundo del caníbal	
22 July 1978	Mein Kampf	Mein kampf	
28 July 1978	Black Emanuelle	Emmanuelle negra	
3 August 1978	Nenè	A mi padre y a mi hijo (nene)	
16 August 1978	Erotomania	El Erotomano	
31 August 1978	Wizards	Los hechiceros de la guerra	
1 September 1978	Prisión de mujeres	Prisión de mujeres	
6 September 1978	Oh, mia bella matrigna	Oh! Mi querida madrastra	
7 September 1978	Ragazza alla pari	Doménica, la ragazza sin par	
13 September 1978	La amiga de mi madre	La amiga de mi madre	
13 September 1978	Beautiful and Dangerous	Bella y peligrosa	
31 October 1978	Carnal Knowledge	Conocimiento carnal	
8 November 1978		5 chicas sensuales	
10 November 1978	The Clear Motives of Desire	Los claros motivos del deseo	
23 November 1978	Four of the Apocalypse	Los 4 del Apocalipsis	
29 November 1978	Wifemistress	Esposa amante	
5 December 1978	La lozana andaluza	La casona andaluza	
11 December 1978	La cognatina	La cuñadita	
15 December 1978	Lady on the Bus	La Dama del ómnibus	
8 January 1979	Alligator	Cocodrilo	
31 January 1979	The Hills Have Eyes	La Pandilla abominable	
7 March 1979	Private Lessons	La profesora privada	
13 March 1979	The Magnificent Two	Revolución femenina	
16 March 1979	Le Jardin des supplices	Jardín de los suplicios	
28 March 1979	The Rocky Horror Picture Show	Orgía de horror y de locura	
30 March 1979	The Last House on the Beach	La séptima mujer	
3 May 1979	The Carabineers	Los carabineros	
23 May 1979	Luto riguroso	Luto riguroso	
28 May 1979		La fuga del delincuente	
1 June 1979	Il vizio di famiglia	Vicios en la familia	
6 June 1979		Aniversario de porcelana	
19 June 1979	La Corea	La Corea	
19 June 1979	The Place Without Limits	El lugar sin límites	
20 June 1979	Fin de la inocencia	Fin de la inocencia	
25 June 1979	La figliastra	La hijastra	
27 June 1979	Alle Kätzchen naschen gern	Placeres de mujer	
4 July 1979	Annie, la vierge de Saint-Tropez	Annie, la virgen de Saintropest	
5 July 1979	The Hellbenders	Los despiadados	
9 July 1979	Lady Bangkok Boy	Pan Pan en Bankok	
19 July 1979	Hardcore	¿Dónde está mi hija?	
19 July 1979	Sex with a Smile	Juegos de amor y picardía	
1 August 1979	The Lady Medic	Doctora en las grandes maniobras	
17 August 1979	Slumber Party '57	Confesiones de quinceañeras	
23 August 1979	Strip First, Then We Talk	Desnúdate y después hablamos	
12 September 1979	The Warriors	Los guerreros	
16 November 1979		El crimen casual	
19 November 1979		Josefina la gatita	
28 November 1979	Pecado de juventud	Pecado de juventud	
28 November 1979	Delirious Saturdays	Sábado alucinante	
3 December 1979	The Visitor	Primas carnales	
6 December 1979	Game of Death	Juego mortal	
11 December 1979		Bocas ardientes	
11 December 1979	Lemon Popsicle	Barquillo de limón	
12 December 1979	Una vergine in famiglia	Una virgen en la familia	
2 January 1980	Forbidden Love Game	Juego de amor prohibido	
17 January 1980	Piccole labbra	Historia de Eva	
18 January 1980	La liceale	La bachiller	
19 January 1980	La professoressa di scienze naturali	La profesora de Ciencias Naturales	
21 January 1980	Change of Sex	Cambio de sexo	
31 January 1980	To Milo tou Satana	Relaciones íntimas	
12 March 1980	Na Boca do Mundo	En la boca del mundo	
17 March 1980	Néa	Cartas a Emmanuella	
24 March 1980	Cuba	Cuba	
9 April 1980	Cuando tejen las arañas	Cuando tejen las arañas	
9 April 1980	Canción de Juventud	Canción de juventud	
7 May 1980	Ratas del asfalto	Ratas del asfalto	
8 May 1980	Roads to the South	Rutas del sur	
13 May 1980	Cinderella (1977)	La Cenicienta	
20 May 1980	La playa del amor	La playa del amor	
16 June 1980	Fellini's Casanova	Casanova	
17 June 1980		La llamaban Jesucristo	
27 June 1980	L'Italia in pigiama	Italia en pijama	
8 July 1980	El sexo me da risa	El sexo me da risa	
10 July 1980	The Great Gundown	Pandilla de renegados	
14 July 1980	Girls on the Road (1972)	Chicas de la carretera	
10 September 1980		Las frías manos de la muerte	
24 September 1980	República dos Assassinos	República de asesinos	
28 October 1980		Un galán de pieles para Venus	
23 January 1981	Fuego	Fuego	
26 January 1981	Sensualidad (1975)	Sensualidad	
27 January 1981	Desnuda en la arena	Desnuda en la arena	
4 March 1981	Fiebre	Fiebre	
18 March 1981	The Brawl Busters	Shaolin el rey dragón	
25 March 1981	Wholly Moses!	El Otro Moisés	
27 March 1981	Black Emanuelle	Emmanuelle negra	
1 April 1981		Caine	
3 April 1981	Fischia il sesso	Los malos pensamientos	
6 April 1981	Naughty Nun	La bella Antonia	
8 April 1981	The Loving Ones	Las cariñosas	
29 April 1981		Las chicas de al lado	
11 May 1981	This is America Part 2	La locura americana 2	
19 May 1981	Possessed	Amor que mata	
28 May 1981	O Prisioneiro do Sexo	Prisionero del sexo	
5 June 1981	Arrête ton char... bidasse!	Maniobras en la cama	
8 June 1981	Last Stop on the Night Train	Violencia en el tren de medianoche	
9 June 1981	La patata bollente	La papa caliente	
17 June 1981	Don't Answer the Phone!	No contesten el teléfono	
17 June 1981	La perversa (1954)	La perversa	
23 June 1981	Looker	Ojos asesinos	
6 July 1981		Entre tanto hemos despertado	
31 July 1981	Monty Python's Life of Brian	La Vida de Brian	
14 August 1981	Tanya's Island	Isla de Tanya	
18 August 1981	The Fruit is Ripe	Fruta madura	
21 August 1981	Tres mujeres en la hoguera	3 mujeres en la hoguera	
26 August 1981		Revelaciones de una cámara indiscreta	
2 September 1981	2069: A Sex Odyssey	Odisea sexual	
4 September 1981	Ms .45	Ángel de la venganza	
7 September 1981	Il ladrone	El ladrón	
9 September 1981	Dead & Buried	El despertar de los muertos	
25 September 1981	Master of Love	Cuentos prohibidos y nada vestidos	
9 October 1981	How to Seduce Your Teacher	La colegiala se enamora	
16 October 1981	It's a Wonderful Life	Que bello es vivir	
21 October 1981	Maniac	Maníaco	
9 November 1981	Hotel Room	Cuarto de hotel	
24 November 1981	El huerto del Francés	El huerto del francés	
4 December 1981	Fearless Fighters	Vengadores de Formosa	
30 December 1981	Runaway	Brigada especial	
13 January 1982	I Spit on Your Grave	El día de una mujer	
22 January 1982	Os 7 Gatinhos	7 gatitos	
22 January 1982	The Agony and the Ecstasy	Temor y éxtasis	
25 January 1982	Histórias Que Nossas Babás não Contavam	Historias que nuestras madres nos contaron	
26 January 1982	Carnada	La carnada	
29 January 1982	Bonitinha Mas Ordinária	Bonita pero ordinaria	
3 March 1982	Der neue Schulmadchen-Report 13. Teil: Sex die Liebe nicht	Reportaje a las colegialas	
10 March 1982	The Beyond	Las 7 puertas del infierno	
29 March 1982		18 torbellinos de jinetes	
31 March 1982	Cannibal Holocaust	Holocausto caníbal	
1 April 1982		Esposa a dieta	
1 April 1982		El larguísimo verano	
12 April 1982		Pecadoras detenidas	
13 April 1982		El casamiento	
15 April 1982	O Torturador	El torturador	
16 April 1982	As Borboletas Também Amam	Las mariposas también aman	
22 April 1982	Nos embalos de Ipanema	Nos embalos de Ipanema	
28 April 1982	Emanuelle's Revenge	Emanuelle y Fracoise	
28 April 1982	La clinica dell'amore	La clínica del amor	
30 April 1982	Peccati a Venezia	Pecados en Venecia	
5 May 1982		Limpieza y masaje	
6 May 1982	Messalina, Messalina!	Mesalina, Mesalina	
12 May 1982	L'adolescente	La Sobrina precoz	
12 May 1982		Obsesión y deseo	
25 May 1982	Making Love	Su otro amor	
30 May 1982	Fiorina la vacca	Fiorina	
7 June 1982	Gungala la pantera nuda	La pantera desnuda	
13 July 1982	Pugni, pirati e karatè	Puños piratas y karates	
13 July 1982		Historia de un amor prohibidísimo	
13 July 1982		Dulces picardías	
26 July 1982		Cuando las camas tiemblan	
10 August 1982	Nightmares	Terror a media noche	
16 August 1982	Pixote	Pixote, la ley del mas débil	
18 August 1982	Primitif (1978)	Caníbales	
23 August 1982		Soltero con música	
8 September 1982	Perversion d'une jeune mariée	Las perversiones de un inmoral	
8 September 1982	Hitch-hike	Corrupción se escribe con sangre	
22 September 1982	Flesh for Frankenstein	Carne para Frankenstein	
30 September 1982	Eye of the Cat	Cuidado con el payaso	
4 October 1982	La sorella di Ursula	La hermana de Urzula	
6 October 1982	The Cousin	Amores y pecados de una adolescente	
6 October 1982	Don't Go Near the Park	Refugio de la maldad	
20 October 1982	The Coming of Sin	La visita del vicio	
5 November 1982	Psycho	Psicópata	
17 November 1982	La Boum	La fiesta	
24 November 1982	Christiane F. – We Children from Bahnhof Zoo	Christiane	
3 December 1982	Cuentos colorados	Cuentos colorados	
9 December 1982	Insaciable	La Viuda insaciable	
10 December 1982	Sex and Astrology	Horóscopo del sexo	
13 December 1982	Les Folies d'Élodie	Memoria de una prenda íntima	
14 December 1982		Confesiones de un amante	
1982	Missing	Desaparecido	Banned during Augusto Pinochet's regime for criticizing his government and the violent actions of his coup. The ban was lifted in 1990.
3 January 1983	W la foca	Dulcemente erótica	
1 February 1983	The Island of Prohibited Pleasures	La Isla de los placeres prohibidos	
14 April 1983		Aventuras eróticas de un provinciano	
11 July 1983	The Hunger	El Ansia	
11 July 1983	The Climax	La inmoral	
1 August 1983		Prisión maldita	
4 August 1983	La casa delle orchidee	La casa orquídeas	
5 December 1983		Penitenciaria	
9 December 1983	No Place to Hide	Sin lugar donde esconderse	
12 January 1984		Deseos eróticos	
25 January 1984	Nana	Nana	
20 March 1984	The Secret Nights of Lucrezia Borgia	Las Noches secretas de Lucrecia Borgia	
23 March 1984	The Last American Virgin	La última virgen de América	
9 April 1984	The Island of the Bloody Plantation	La Isla de las esclavas desnudas	
16 April 1984	A Night in Heaven	Noches de pasión	
25 April 1984	The Evil That Men Do	Justicia salvaje	
3 May 1984	The Honorary Consul	Borrasca de pasiones	
30 May 1984	How to Succeed with Girls (1964)	Como tener éxito con las mujeres	
1 June 1984	Scusi lei è normale?	Las locas vuelven la jaula	
13 June 1984	Fêmeas em Fuga	Chicas en fuga	
27 June 1984	Los Jóvenes pandilleros (1983)	Los Jóvenes pandilleros	
29 June 1984	El Esperado Amor Desesperado (1976)	El Esperado Amor Desesperado	
6 December 1984	2020 Texas Gladiators	Gladiadores del 2000 en Texas	
11 December 1984		El lenguaje del amor	
26 December 1984		Historia de un amor	
1 February 1985	Pacific Banana	Líneas aérea bananas	
4 February 1985	Schulmädchen-Report	Las colegialas se confiesan	
8 February 1985	Kill Squad	Brigada de dragones	
18 March 1985		Insaciable	
27 March 1985		Tinieblas	
9 April 1985	Nathalie dans l'enfer nazi	Campo de perversión	
10 April 1985		Desnuda para el deseo	
22 May 1985	Dezenove Mulheres e Um Homem	19 mujeres y un hombre	
28 May 1985	Crimes of Passion	Crímenes de pasión	
11 July 1985		Relaciones de mujeres	
21 August 1985		Fabricante de erotismo	
22 August 1985	Sex with a Smile	Juego de amor y picardía	
27 August 1985		El cuerpo de la muchacha	
25 September 1985	American Drive-In	Ese loco loco autocine americano	
25 September 1985	Screwballs	Los rompecocos	
5 December 1985	Der neue Schulmädchen-Report. 2. Teil: Was Eltern den Schlaf raubt	Las colegialas se confiesan 2 parte	
5 May 1986	Girl with the Golden Panties	La muchacha de las bragas de oro	
6 May 1986		La corrupción	
27 May 1986		Implora tu muerte	
14 August 1986	Melody in Love	Melody in love	
24 September 1986		Cruel idolatría	
24 October 1986	Ninfas Diabólicas	Ninfas diabólicas	
5 November 1986	Gros Dégueulasse	El Gordo inbancable	
6 November 1986		Los últimos caníbales	
6 November 1986		Los violentos bastardos	
12 March 1987	Catherine Chérie	Catherine Cherie	
14 April 1987	Ultraje	Ultraje salvaje	
27 April 1987		La primera vez siempre duele	
5 May 1987		Sueño de una viciosa	
13 May 1987		Knockout	
15 May 1987	L'isola delle svedesi	La isla de las suecas	
19 May 1987	The Unfaithful Wife	Una esposa infiel	
10 June 1987		Ángeles del sexo	
22 June 1987	Classe mista	Las colegialas quieren aprender	
6 August 1987		Karina	
27 August 1987		Propiedad privada	
12 November 1987	Evil Dead II	Los muertos diabólicos	
1987	The Last Temptation of Christ	La última tentación de Cristo	Banned under the regime of Augusto Pinochet for its blasphemic themes. The ban was later lifted, with the film premiering in Santiago in 2003.
21 January 1988		Sin escape	
12 April 1988	Schulmädchen-Report 5. Teil - Was Eltern wirklich wissen sollten	Cuando los padres ignoran lo que hacen las colegialas	
12 April 1988	Schulmädchen-Report 6. Teil - Was Eltern gern vertuschen möchten	Cuando las colegialas pecan	
13 April 1988	Schulmädchen - Report 3 : Was Eltern nicht mal ahnen	Cuando las colegialas crecen	
14 April 1988	Young Lucrezia	Lucrecia Borgia la amante de todos	
14 April 1988	Schulmädchen-Report 7. Teil - Doch das Herz muß dabei sein	Las colegialas aman de corazón	
27 April 1988		Cuerpos para el amor	
8 June 1988	Black Aphrodite	Afrodita la diosa del sexo y la venganza	
10 June 1988	Dragon Against Vampire	El dragón contra el vampiro	
12 July 1988	Quiet Cool	Unidos para la venganza	
10 August 1988	Sucedió en el internado	Sucedió en el internado	
7 September 1988	La segretaria privata di mio padre	La secretaria particular de mi padre	
21 September 1988	Docteur Françoise Gailland	La doctora privada	
3 October 1988		Ardientes y sexuales	
21 December 1988		Ciudad prohibida	
20 January 1989		Salvaje deseo de amar	
3 April 1989	Last Rites	Mafia rito de sangre	
3 May 1989		Demonios	
24 May 1989	Desnuda en la arena	Furia sexual/ Desnuda en la arena	
12 June 1989	Historias de amor y de masacre	Historia de amor y de masacre	
15 June 1989	La gatita	La gatita	
15 June 1989		Prostitution	
23 August 1989	Brothers in Arms	Amarga pesadilla 2	
12 September 1989		El imperio	
20 September 1989	Too Hot to Handle	Ardiente y pecadora	
26 September 1989	Domino	Domino	
17 November 1989	Reform School Girls	Motín en el reformatorio de mujeres	
2 January 1990		Orgía de placeres	
22 March 1991		La hembra	
1 January 1991		Intimidad fatal	
1 January 1991	Perversión	Perversión	
18 March 1991	El fin de la inocencia	Fin de la inocencia	
22 March 1991		Las hembras	
28 March 1991	The Girls of Penthouse	Las chicas de Penthouse	
16 April 1991	Angels of Passion	Angel de pasión	
4 June 1991	The Night Porter	El portero de la noche	
10 June 1991	Black Cobra	Cobra negra	
9 September 1991	Hot T-Shirts	Camisetas mojadas	
10 September 1991	Penthouse Pet of the Year Play-Off 1991	Penthouse I	
3 October 1991	Underground	Underground	
3 December 1991	Body Parts	Body Parts	
19 December 1991	The Return of Superfly	El Regreso de Superfly	
31 December 1991	Paganini	Paganini	
11 March 1992	Lady of the Night	La señora de la noche	
6 April 1992	Pepi, Luci, Bom	Pepi Luci Bom y otras chicas del montón	
15 April 1992	Secrets of a French Maid	Los secretos de una mucama	
24 April 1992	Burning Desire	Deseos calientes	
10 July 1992	Bilbao	Bilbao	
14 July 1992	The Lawnmower Man	El hombre en el jardín	Re-rated and released on theaters.
13 January 1993	Martial Law III: Mission of Justice	Misión de justicia	
14 December 1994		Deseo perverso	
19 January 1995	The Mutilator	El mutilador	
14 June 1995	Playtime - Spiele der Leidenschaft	Juegos de pareja	
16 June 1995	Tropic of Desire	Trópico de deseo	
4 July 1995		La guía del amor	
29 January 1996	Last Rites	Los Ultimos ritos	

== Videos ==
Date of ban	Title	Spanish title
1 January 1974	The Disappearance of Flight 412	Vuelo 412 en peligro
1 January 1976		Violación
1 January 1978	Madame Claude 2	Madame Claude 2
18 May 1983	Sexo vs. sexo	Sexo contra sexo
30 November 1983	Maniac	Venganza diabólica
1 January 1984	La donna della calda terra	Mujer de la tierra caliente
11 April 1984	The Key	Llave, La
23 July 1984	Montonera	Montonera
6 August 1984	Chained Heat	Cadenas calientes
16 August 1984	La nuora giovane	Nuera joven, La
5 November 1984	Parahyba Mulher Macho	Parahyba mujer macho
9 January 1985	Come to My Bedside	Ven a mi cama
10 April 1985	Under Fire	Bajo fuego
2 August 1985	Rolf	Rolf - El Ultimo Mercenario
21 October 1985	Savage Streets	Calles salvajes
30 October 1985	El pico	El Pico
3 December 1985	The Future Is Woman	El Futuro es mujer
26 May 1986	The Warning	Atención, La
30 July 1986	Dog Day	Dog Day
11 August 1986	Invasion U.S.A.	Invasión USA
21 August 1986	Una donna allo specchio	Una mujer en el espejo
22 August 1986	Reform School Girls	Motín en la cárcel de mujeres
29 September 1986	Me siento extraña	Me siento extraña
16 October 1986		Duran duran (clip musical)
28 October 1986	The Happy Hooker	Happy hooker
30 October 1986		A propósito de cometas
5 November 1986		Dibujando con el lado derecho del cerebro
13 November 1986		Son esta mis ultimas imágenes
26 November 1986	Another Love Story	Otra historia de amor
27 November 1986	Hell Of The Living Dead	El Infierno de los muertos vivientes
12 January 1987		Motherland, The
13 January 1987	The Hotel New Hampshire	Hotel new hampshire
11 February 1987	Faceless	Cazadores nocturnos
16 April 1987	White Fire	Fuego blanco
24 April 1987	Goodbye Emmanuelle	Goodbye Emmanuelle
5 June 1987	Todo o nada	Todo o nada
23 June 1987	Velvet Smooth	Suave terciopelo
2 July 1987	American Nightmare	Pesadilla americana
11 August 1987		Vidente, La
20 August 1987		Juguemos al doctor
3 September 1987	Hell Night	Noche infernal
3 September 1987		Aprendamos a amar
9 September 1987		Cama pecadora
10 September 1987	Night of the living dead	Noche de los muertos vivientes, La
10 September 1987	If You Don't Stop It... You'll Go Blind!	No sigas así o quedaras ciego
15 September 1987		Escape sangriento
23 September 1987	El despertar del sexo	El Despertar del sexo
16 October 1987		Prisión infernal
20 October 1987	Women's Prison Massacre	Emmanuelle esclava de la corrupción
20 October 1987		Hanna d una adolescente en el infierno
28 October 1987		El Pan nuestro de cada día
10 November 1987		Vendetta
12 November 1987	Behind Closed Shutter	Tras la persiana
12 November 1987	Angel	Angel de día demonio de noche
25 November 1987	Brigade des moeurs	Brigada de moralidad
11 December 1987		Acorraladas por el terror
29 December 1987		Gritos nocturnos
6 January 1988	The Trap	Trampa, La
3 February 1988		Las Amantes de Venecia
11 February 1988	Acta general de Chile	Acta general de chile
16 February 1988		5 veces el diablo
2 March 1988		Aborto clandestino
2 March 1988	Caligula... The Untold Story	Las Esclavas de caligula
4 April 1988	Train spécial pour SS	SS tren de prisioneros
5 April 1988	Lemon Popsicle	Chicle caliente
28 April 1988		Viaje de egresadas
3 May 1988		Sexo móvil
4 May 1988		Ciudad de pobres corazones
5 May 1988		Todo lo que Ud. soñó con las estrellas y no pudo rea
10 May 1988	Nate and Hayes	Isla salvaje
10 May 1988		Todo el horror de Dario Argento
12 May 1988	Exploits of a Young Don Juan	La Iniciación
25 May 1988		Día violento
9 June 1988		Circulo sexual
15 June 1988	Victims of Vice	Brigada de moralidad 2
15 June 1988	The Driller Killer	El Asesino del taladro
17 June 1988	Body Count	Campamento del terror
17 June 1988	Goodbye Uncle Tom	Adiós Tío Tom
1 July 1988	Steamy Windows	Ventanas eróticas
11 July 1988	A Nightmare on Elm Street/Children of the Night	Pánico a la muerte/Los hijos de la noche
12 July 1988	Because of the Cats	A causa de los gatos
19 July 1988		Gatas, Las
19 July 1988	Las colegialas	Colegialas, Las
25 July 1988		Secuestro
2 August 1988		Túnel
24 August 1988		Amantes hasta la muerte
29 August 1988		Herederos, Los
29 August 1988		Placeres ocultos
31 August 1988		Pesadilla en la ultima casa
3 October 1988		Dios los cría ellos se juntan
10 October 1988		Volvamos a querernos
10 October 1988	La France interdite	Francia prohibida
14 October 1988	The Evil Dead	Despertar del diablo
15 October 1988	The Public Woman	Mujer publica, La
17 October 1988		Ardiente objeto del deseo
17 October 1988		Vídeo violencia
20 October 1988	Jennifer	Jenifer internado de señoritas
25 October 1988	The Black Gestapo	Gestapo negra, La
3 December 1988		Wild pair, The
3 December 1988		El Maleficio
22 December 1988		Mujer en el salvador
22 December 1988		Dulce patria
28 December 1988		El Beso del asesino
9 January 1989		Martes
9 January 1989		Hembras en celo
11 January 1989		Delirante radioactivo
12 January 1989		Guerrillas centroamericanas
3 February 1989	A Ilha do Amor	Xavana the island of love
10 February 1989	The Daughter of Emanuelle	Hija de emmanuelle, La
9 March 1989		Hembra diabólica
9 March 1989		Reclusorio de muchachas malas
9 March 1989		Breaking tras las rejas
10 March 1989		Antropófago
10 March 1989		Hiena, La
13 March 1989		Al acecho
15 March 1989		Racing fury
20 March 1989		Los Gatitos cariñosos
27 March 1989		Bloody birthday
7 April 1989		Cuerpos calientes
10 April 1989	Alice Goodbody	Alice god body
10 April 1989		Hard rock zombies
14 April 1989	Zombiethon	Zombiethon
20 April 1989	Chile, the Obstinate Memory	Recuerdo de Salvador Allende
20 April 1989		Tv opresión
25 April 1989	L.A. Crackdown	Angeles crack down
2 May 1989		Enredo familiar
5 May 1989	Bloody Mama	Mama sangrienta
7 May 1989		For a millon
7 May 1989		Summer rain
11 May 1989		Terror en la oscuridad
17 May 1989	Fresh Kill	Fresh kill
2 June 1989		Crímenes por encargo
2 June 1989		Estudiante superdotado
2 June 1989		La Otra Gabriela
2 June 1989		Newly deads, The
7 June 1989	A Taste of Hell	Una Prueba del infierno
13 June 1989		El Informante
13 June 1989	Raw Deal	Ejecutor, El
15 June 1989	Carmen nue	Carmen nue
26 June 1989	Tokugawa sekkusu kinshi-rei: Shikijô daimyô	El Imperio del sexo
28 June 1989	Der Mann mit dem goldenen Pinsel	El Hombre del pincel de oro
5 July 1989	Armed and Dangerous	Armados y peligrosos
5 July 1989	Il mondo di notte nº 3	Mundo al desnudo
12 July 1989	Cheerleader Camp	El Cazador de cheerleaders
13 July 1989	Hell of the Living Dead	El Infierno de los muertos vivientes
19 July 1989	Manhunter	El Cazador de hombres
19 July 1989	Hanna D. - The Girl from Vondel Park	A 16 ans dans l'enfer de la drogue a Amsterdam
28 July 1989	Stripped to Kill	Desnuda para matar
4 August 1989		Le cromicon sed de sangre
8 August 1989		Angel del deseo, El
10 August 1989	Possession	Una mujer poseída
14 August 1989		Amor en primavera
18 August 1989	Till Marriage Do Us Part	Pecado a la italiana
22 August 1989		Modelo del crimen
22 August 1989	The Brawl Busters	Dragón del shaolin
31 August 1989	Cannibal Holocaust	Caníbal holocaust
12 September 1989	La legge della Camorra	Ley de la camorra
12 September 1989	Soft Beds, Hard Battles	Camas blandas batallas duras
12 September 1989		Cementerio sangriento
12 September 1989	The Last Executioner	Ejecutor final
12 September 1989		¿Y donde esta el mástil?
13 September 1989		Esa loca noche americana
15 September 1989	Put Your Devil In My Hell	Mete tu diablo en mi infierno
15 September 1989	Naked and Cruel	Naked and cruel
15 September 1989		Madrastra, La
22 September 1989	Toy Soldiers	Soldados de juguetes
28 September 1989	The Eleventh Commandment	El Onceavo mandamiento
29 September 1989		Cacería de un criminal
29 September 1989		Contacto en los ángeles
29 September 1989		Cacería de traficantes
29 September 1989		Bodas del demonio
2 October 1989		Diversiones del tercer sexo, Las
3 October 1989		Conspiración macabra
8 October 1989		Escuela del terror
8 October 1989	Confessions of a Pop Performer	Confesiones de un cantante
19 October 1989		Fuerzas de asalto
30 October 1989		Bruto leopardo
3 November 1989		Reza por tu muerte sartana
3 November 1989		Canción triste del soho
10 November 1989	The World Is Full of Married Men	El Mundo esta lleno de hombres casados
10 November 1989		Juego de amor
16 November 1989		Agujero infernal
17 November 1989		Almuerzo fatal
20 November 1989		Posando para morir
24 November 1989		Violada
24 November 1989	Spicy Chile	Chile caliente
27 November 1989		Reformatorio de mujeres
30 November 1989		Terror en la ciudad
1 December 1989		Inocente y delincuente
5 December 1989		Cueca de la esperanza
7 December 1989		Dagman y CIA
12 December 1989	Buona come il pane	Tan buena como el pan
15 December 1989	Scorpion Thunderbolt	Escorpión thunderbolt
15 December 1989		Un cornudo en vacaciones
15 December 1989		Lucas el contrabandista
8 January 1990		Alguien te está mirando
16 January 1990		Holocausto 2, recuerdos delirios venganza part 2
26 January 1990		Che Guevara
26 January 1990		Prisión Mortal
26 January 1990		Une Cage dore
31 January 1990		Asilo el gran escape
13 February 1990		Sangrienta premonición
16 February 1990		Secuestro Animal
18 February 1990		La Mucama negra
19 February 1990	Enforcer from Death Row	Enforcer from death row
19 February 1990		Horror nuclear (El Show)
28 February 1990		Conspiración nocturna
28 February 1990	Red Light in the White House	Luz roja en la Casa Blanca
1 March 1990		Defensa Personal Proteja su familia – Karate 1
13 March 1990		Vida me hizo delincuente, La
19 March 1990		Música nocturna
19 March 1990	Mañosas pero sabrosas	Nos reímos de la migra
25 March 1990		Blood bath
30 March 1990	The Perils of Gwendoline in the Land of the Yik-Yak	Vírgenes Guerreras
4 April 1990	Satan's Blade	La Espada de Satanás
4 April 1990		Guerra de los Ninjas, La
4 April 1990	Breeders	Invasión Sexual, La
4 April 1990		Locuras de la naturaleza
20 April 1990		Camino sangriento
20 April 1990		El Nombre del mal
23 April 1990	Pink Salon: "We're Waiting For You With Tissue Paper"	Casa de masaje en Tokio
23 April 1990		Muchacho no bailan, Los
23 April 1990		Mujeres diabólicas
30 April 1990		Patines de la muerte
4 May 1990	Reform School Girls	Motín en la cárcel de mujeres
9 May 1990	Deadly Reactor	Deadly reactor
14 May 1990	The Toolbox Murders	Herramientas mortales
14 May 1990		Revenger, The
15 May 1990		Terror en la oscuridad
17 May 1990	The Scoundrel	Scoundrel, The
18 May 1990		Venganza mortal
23 May 1990		Braceras, Las
30 May 1990		Casa de muñecas para adultos
30 May 1990		La Graduación de un delincuente
30 May 1990		Llueve sobre Santiago
30 May 1990	La primavera de los escorpiones	Primavera de los escorpiones, La
30 May 1990		Viuda Negra, La
4 June 1990		Dos caras para el crimen
4 June 1990		Gatos, Los
11 June 1990		Y donde esta el hotel?
18 June 1990	Rockula	Rockula
22 June 1990	Raiders of the Golden Triangle	Cazadores del triángulo dorado
27 June 1990		Secuestradores, Los
28 June 1990		Desde atrás
4 July 1990	Joe Versus the Volcano	Joe v/s Volcano
18 July 1990		Fiesta de togas
3 September 1990		Tomar revancha
10 September 1990		El Ultimo mercenario
14 September 1990		Punk rock movies, The
14 September 1990	Rainbow Bridge	Rainbow bridge
14 September 1990		Regreso a la vida
3 October 1990	Qué buena está mi ahijada	Que buena esta mi ahijada
3 October 1990	El Semental	El Semental de Palo Alto
10 October 1990		4 Hermanas seductoras (PAL)
10 December 1990	The Everlasting Secret Family	Everlasting Secret Family, The
1 January 1991	Savage Attraction	Atracción Salvaje
1 January 1991		Intimidad fatal
1 January 1991		Perversión
18 January 1991	The Invisibile Maniac	El Maníaco Invisible
19 February 1991	Smooth Velvet, Raw Silk	Black Emanuelle; White Emanuelle
18 March 1991	Blue Belle	Fin de la inocencia
22 March 1991	Una cavalla tutta nuda	Yegua, La
27 March 1991	Playboy: Sexy Lingerie II	Sexy lingerie II
28 March 1991	Girls of Penthouse	Chicas de Penthouse, Las
16 April 1991	Angel of Passion	Angel de Pasión
3 May 1991	La Noche de Venus	Noche de Venus, La
23 May 1991		Hacha asesina, El
28 May 1991		Herederos del mal, Los
28 May 1991	Young Nurses in Love	Jóvenes enfermeras
28 May 1991	La Mujer Ajena (1954)	Mujer ajena, La
4 June 1991	The Night Porter	El Portero de la Noche
10 June 1991	The Black Cobra	Cobra Negra
10 June 1991	Black Cobra Woman	Emanuelle's Black Cobra
26 July 1991	Ai no Ekusutashi	Extasis de amor
26 July 1991	Gestapo's Last Orgy	Gestapo el escuadrón de la tortura (sadismo)
1 August 1991	Zombie Lake	Lago de los Zombies, El
16 August 1991		Emmanuelle y los placeres de una mujer
9 September 1991	Hot T-Shirts	Camisetas Mojadas
10 September 1991		Penthouse I
3 October 1991		Underground
9 October 1991	Tre pesci, una gatta nel letto che scotta	Tres para una (Deseo sin limite)
16 October 1991		Tiffany
17 October 1991	Girls of Penthouse 2	Penthouse II
10 November 1991	Bar Girls	Chicas de la Barra, Las
12 November 1991		Sexy Strip's
18 November 1991		Sentidos
2 December 1991	Young Lady Chatterley II	Los Amantes de Lady Chatterley II
3 December 1991	Body Parts	Body Parts
19 December 1991	The Return of Superfly	El Regreso de Superfly
23 December 1991		América al desnudo
31 December 1991		Paganini
3 January 1992		Noche de póker
7 January 1992		Intimo
7 January 1992	Girls of Penthouse 3	Penthouse III
24 January 1992	The Great American Beauty Contest	Great American bikini challenge, The
27 January 1992	The Bikini Open	Bikini Open
6 February 1992		Deseos ocultos
11 February 1992		Any time any play
17 February 1992		Rivals of love
18 February 1992		Thrilling love
25 February 1992		Canto de sirenas
11 March 1992		La Señora de la noche
12 March 1992		Hollywood fantasy's II
31 March 1992	Girls of Penthouse 4	Penthouse IV
3 April 1992		Pequeños labios
17 April 1992		Amantes hasta la muerte
20 April 1992		Los Amores de Laurita
12 May 1992		La Ceni también se sienta
22 May 1992		House 6, el terror continua
26 May 1992		Inicio de Pamela, El
28 May 1992		Culto para Afrodita
14 June 1992		La Sutil fascinación del pecado
22 June 1992		Gira del terror, La
24 June 1992		Amor sucio (PAL)
16 July 1992		Muerte en el bronx
7 September 1992		Warm and wet
14 September 1992		Guardianes de la cárcel de mujeres
30 September 1992		Salvaje sueño americano
27 October 1992		Compañeras de cuarto
28 October 1992		Madame (La amante prohibida)
2 November 1992		Hágalo Con seguridad
13 November 1992		Masacre en el infierno II
30 November 1992		Furia de Pasiones
1 December 1992		Amor y Pasión
15 December 1992		Amantes modernos
30 December 1992		Confesiones de un asesino en serie
19 January 1993		Intriga
25 January 1993	Penthouse Passport to Paradise: Hawaii	Pasaporte al Paraíso
26 January 1993		Sex Appel
1 February 1993		Baby Blood
28 April 1993		El Cónsul Honorario
29 April 1993		Eros
11 May 1993		Erotic fantasies II
24 June 1993		Venus Negra, La
22 July 1993		Después de la rutina
10 August 1993		Georgia Poder que mata
13 September 1993		Penthouse 1,2 y 3
23 September 1993		Jugar con fuego
1 October 1993		Fuerza de impacto
11 October 1993		Deadly Deception
13 October 1993	The True Story of the Nun of Monza	La Monja de Monza la verdadera historia
22 October 1993	The Ages of Lulu	Las Edades de Lulu
3 November 1993		Making love – The French way
6 December 1993		Amantes millonarias
6 December 1993		Gata rosada, La
6 December 1993		Pasión Letal
6 December 1993		Tres hijas
12 January 1994		Estafa, La
19 January 1994		Carne para el placer
30 January 1994		El Destripador de New York
10 February 1994		Sirvientas del sexo
20 April 1994		Propuesta Excitante
6 July 1994	Aswang	Aswang
6 July 1994		Trampa Caliente
13 July 1994		Instinto sexual
15 July 1994		Ardiente sadismo IV
27 July 1994	A Better Tomorrow II	Amenaza final II La revancha
27 July 1994	El fontanero, su mujer, y otras cosas de meter...	El Fontanero, su mujer y otras cosas de meter
29 July 1994	Anything that moves	Anything that moves
2 August 1994		Los Demonios
23 August 1994	Dirty Love	Amor sucio
23 August 1994	Otra historia de amor	Otra historia de amor
25 August 1994	The Lover	Amante, La
5 September 1994	Erotique	Erotique
7 September 1994	Roxy: A Gang Bang Fantasy	Roxy
7 September 1994		Tentaciones intimas
26 September 1994	Untamed Cowgirls of the Wild West	Vaqueras salvajes
5 October 1994	The Trap	Trampa, La
26 October 1994	Caligula... The Untold Story	Caligula una historia que jamas se ha contado
16 November 1994	Erotic Showcase I	Erotic show case: Best friends – The painter – Clowning arou
16 November 1994	Play Time	Play Time
16 November 1994	Playboy: Secrets of Making Love... to the Same Person Forever, Volume II	Secrets of making love to the same persons for ever vol II
17 November 1994	Temptress	Temptress
6 December 1994	Miami Spice II	Miami Spice II (2)
14 December 1994		Deseo perverso
19 January 1995		El Mutilador
30 January 1995	Cannibal Holocaust	Cannibal Holocaust
30 January 1995		Della Morte dell Amore
30 January 1995	H.P. Lovecraft's: Necronomicon	Necronomicon
10 February 1995		Lasse Braun's American desire
27 March 1995		Hermandad del Sexo La II
7 April 1995	Center Spread Girls	Centers Pread erotic Vídeo
18 April 1995		Deep inside Hollywood
21 April 1995	The Story of O	Story of O., The
14 June 1995	Playtime	Juegos de pareja
16 June 1995	Tropic of Desire	Trópico de deseo
4 July 1995		La Guía del amor 3
14 July 1995		Pussy Galore
19 July 1995	John Wayne Bobbitt Uncut	John Wayne Bobbit sin corte
29 August 1995	Getting Personal	Getting personal
5 September 1995	Nothing to Hide II: Justine	Nothing to hide II
1 October 1995	Boy	Boy
3 October 1995		Maestro de la exitación
11 October 1995		Gatas Salvajes
11 October 1995	House of Lust (1985)	Mansión de la Lujuria
11 October 1995	On Trial 3: Takin' It to the Jury	On trial part 3 Taking it to the Jury
11 October 1995	Wicked at Heart (1995)	Wicked at Heart
17 October 1995		Pintura fresca
2 November 1995		Siempre
10 November 1995	Babewatch	Babe watch
10 November 1995		Dark Angel
10 November 1995		Frankenstein
10 November 1995		Guía para amantes
15 November 1995		El Super sexo
16 November 1995		Therapist, The
23 November 1995	Super Boobs Vol. 1	Super Boops
29 November 1995		Difícil de parar
15 December 1995		Bad girls # 3 cellblock 69
20 December 1995	Mind Games	Mind Games
21 December 1995	X Factor (1984)	Factor X
21 December 1995		Videos de mejoramiento sexual vol 3
27 December 1995		Solo por una noche
27 December 1995		Strip search
18 January 1996		Casanova
29 January 1996		Ultimos ritos, Los
31 January 1996		Altered Paradise
31 January 1996		Sweet as money
12 March 1996	Malcolm XXX	Malcom XXX
3 April 1996	Carlita's Backway	Carlita's Backway
4 April 1996	Saloon Kiss	Fuhrer's Dolls
4 April 1996	Secrets	Secrets
11 April 1996	Busted (1989)	Busted sex Search
6 May 1996		Violación el regreso de Emanuelle
29 May 1996	Sex and Zen	Sex and Zen
8 July 1996	Game of Seduction	Relaciones peligrosas de un Aristócrata
17 July 1996	Urotsukidōji III: Return of the Overfiend	Urotsuki Doji III Ep. 2 El retorno del Sr. del Mal
5 September 1996	Soft Places	Soft places
12 September 1996	Fanny Hill	Fanny Hill
2 December 1996	Flesh and Boner	Flesh and Boner
4 December 1996	Insatiable	Insatiable
5 February 1997	Independence Day	El Día De La Independencia
3 December 1997	Hooter In The Hood	Hooter In The Hood
16 June 1998	The Erotic Adventures of the Three Musketeers	Erotic Adventures Of The Three Musketeers, The
18 June 1998	Laura, un gran amor	El Amor De Laura
18 June 1998		Presidiarios Y Prostitutas
22 July 1998	Racquel In The Wild	Raquel In The Wild
24 August 1998	Above The Knee (1995)	Above The Knee
24 August 1998	Allure (1996)	Allure
24 August 1998	American Beauty 2: The Devil in Miss Angel	American Beauty 2
24 August 1998		Broad Daylite # 2
24 August 1998	Fais-moi tout	Fee Moi Tout
24 August 1998		Superstar Of Lesbianism # 13
24 August 1998		Superstar Of Lesbianism # 14
24 August 1998		Superstar Of Lesbianism # 15
24 August 1998		Superstar Of Lesbianism # 5
24 August 1998		Superstar Of Lesbianism # 8
24 August 1998		Superstar Of Lesbianism # 9
24 August 1998		Swift Kick
24 August 1998		Tits And Tats
16 September 1998		Nalgas Intimas
7 October 1998		Tower III, The
7 October 1998	Private Film 13: Virgin Treasures 2	Virgin Treasures II
8 October 1998		Forbidden Desires
8 October 1998		Tower, The
8 October 1998		Tower The 2
15 October 1998		Wide Open Spaces
18 January 1999	Better Sex Video Vol. 7: Advanced Sexual Fantasies	Better Sex Videoserie The Vol 7 – Advanced Sexual Fantasies
25 March 1999		Fotos
14 June 1999	Hustler White	Hustler White
23 August 1999	Shayla's House Of Bondage	Shayla's House Of Bondage Parte 1
31 May 2000	Glory Holes of San Francisco	Agujeros de San Francisco
31 May 2000		Jóvenes Perdidos
31 May 2000		Refrescante
31 May 2000	Sleepaway Camp	Campamento de Verano
31 October 2000	Perro Golfo	Un Perro Golfo
31 October 2000		3 Girl and a dog
6 December 2000		Cuentos Calientes
