= Carne (1968 film) =

- Theatrical release poster
- English: Meat
- Directed by: Armando Bó
- Written by: Armando Bó
- Produced by: Amando Bó
- Starring: Isabel Sarli; Víctor Bó; Vicente Rubino; Pepita Muñoz
- Cinematography: Ricardo Younis
- Edited by: Rosalino Caterbetti
- Music by: Eligio Ayala Morín; Rodolfo Ubriaco
- Production company: Sociedad Independiente Filmadora Argentina (SIFA)
- Release date: 24 October 1968
- Running time: 90 minutes
- Country: Argentina
- Language: Spanish

Carne (English: Meat or Flesh) is a 1968 Argentine sexploitation film written and directed by Armando Bó. It stars Isabel Sarli as Delicia, a worker in a meat-packing factory where she becomes the victim of rapists.

== Cast ==
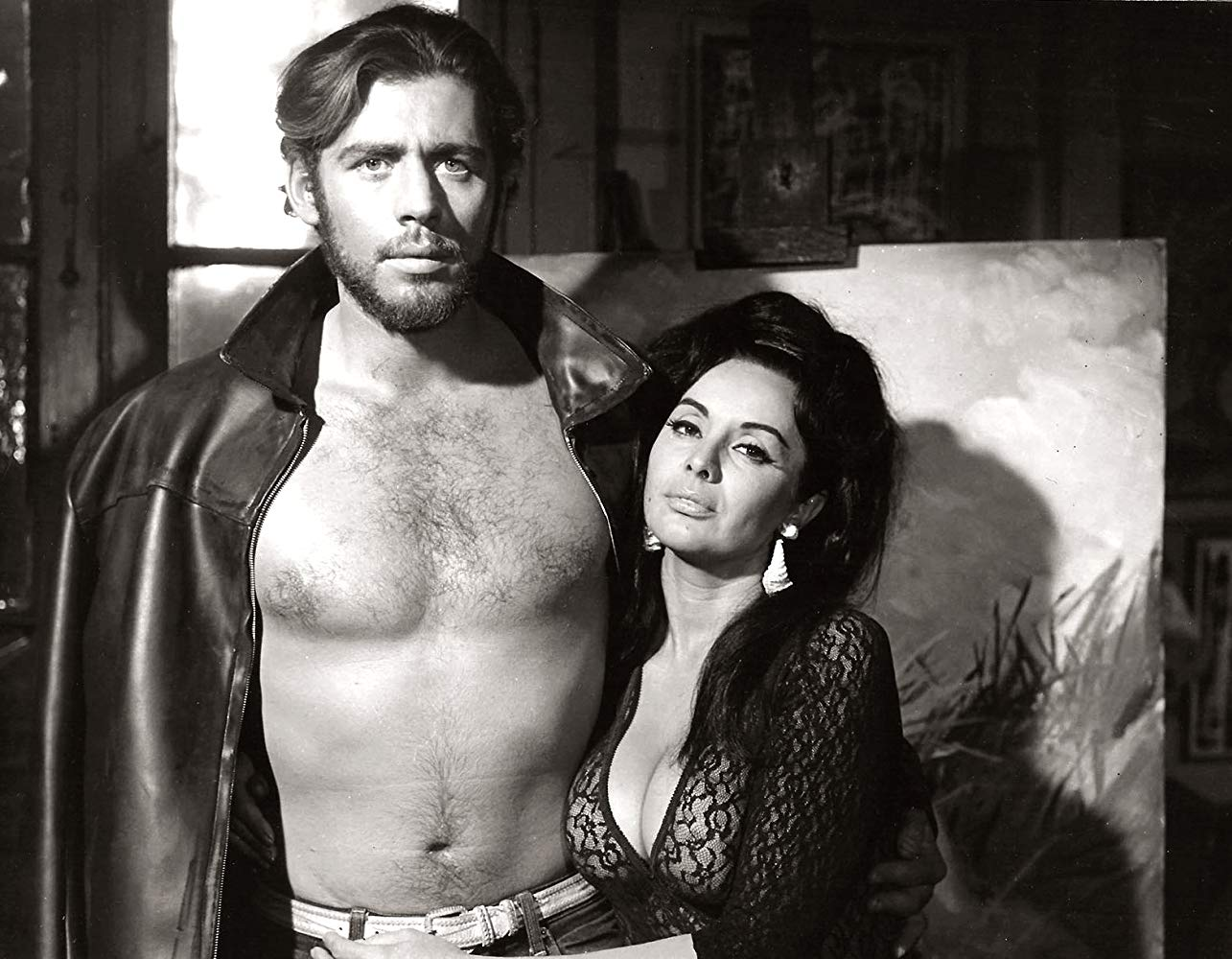
Víctor Bó and Isabel Sarli as Antonio and Delicia.

- Isabel Sarli as Delicia
- Víctor Bó as Antonio Aicardi
- Romualdo Quiroga as Humberto "el macho"
- Vicente Rubino as a homosexual
- Juan Carlos Altavista as José García
- Alba Solís as a singing worker
- Oscar Valicelli as Jacinto
- Pepita Muñoz as a worker

== Production ==
In the film Isabel Sarli has explicit sex scenes with Víctor Bó, who was Armando Bo's son. Armando and Isabel were lovers at the time so Victor was her stepson. In interviews, Victor later talked about the difficulty of filming the erotic scenes with Isabel "Coca" Sarli: "With Coca it was a very particular relationship, because when we had love scenes we both laughed because we were so nervous."

== Release ==
Carne premiered on October 24, 1968 in various theaters in Buenos Aires and the Ocean Rex cinema in Mar del Plata. Reportedly, on its premiere day more than two thousand spectators made long lines to watch the movie. In the important Buenos Aires theaters Hindú and Callao, which were used for statistics, the turnout was 2,633 people, being the most watched movie of those that premiered that day.

== Critical analysis ==
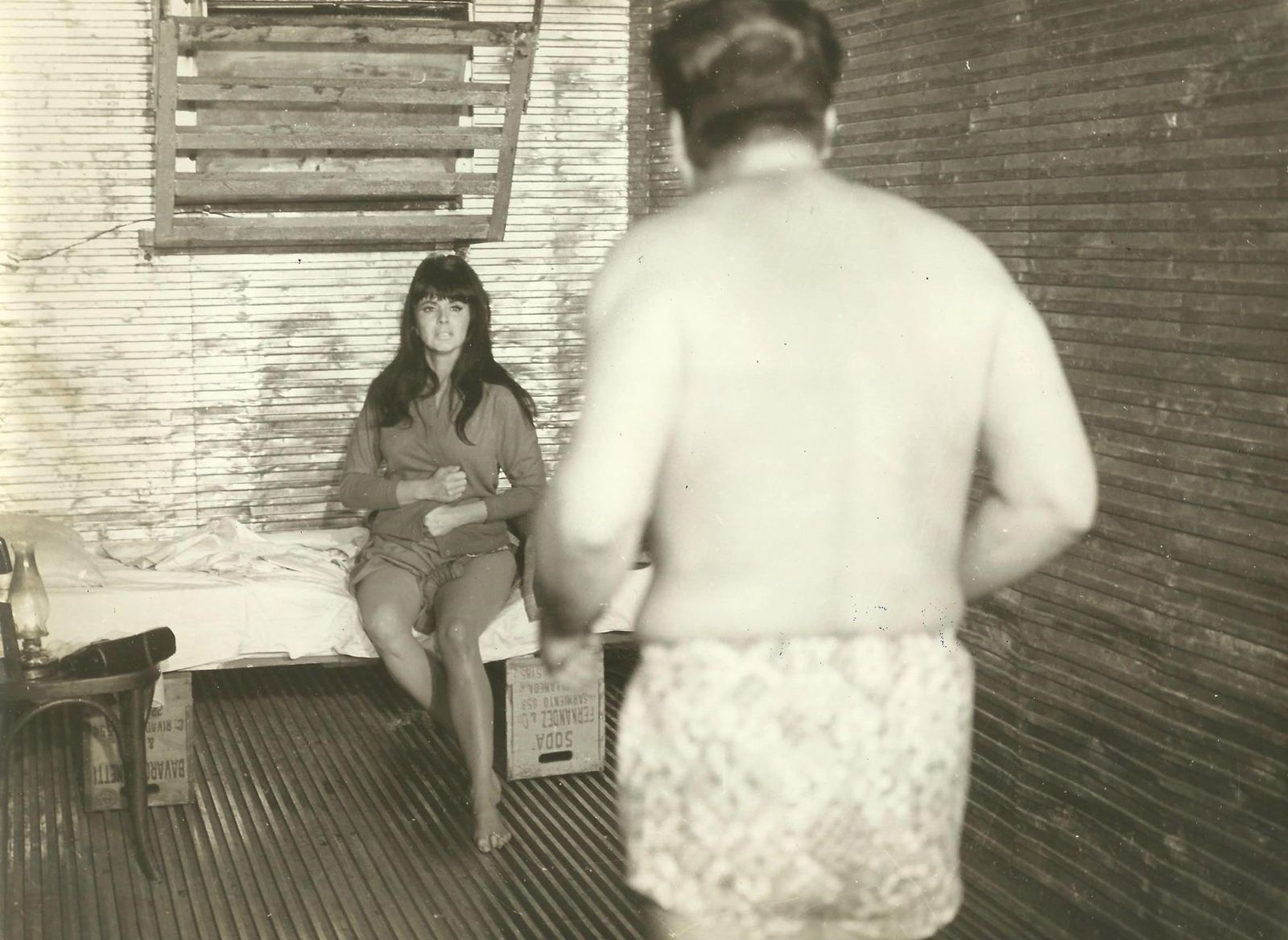
Delicia (Sarli) about to be raped in a truck where she was abducted by her co-workers.

Writers Raúl Manrupe and María Alejandra Portela characterized the film as having "black and white footage without any explanation, red as the dominant color and camp carried to its ultimate consequences." Throughout the film, the female body is objectified as "a piece of meat", featuring overlays of images of cuts of meat and Sarli's body. Writer Tamara Drajner Barredo felt that "this identification of the female body with the meat has as a correlate an identification of the sexual desire with an animalized and irrational carnal desire." This is made explicit in the final dialogue, in which Antonio tells Delicia that they raped her "to satisfy the animal instinct that we all carry inside. But without soul, without love." Bó always maintained that his films dealt with social issues, evident in early films such as Thunder Among the Leaves from 1958 and Sabaleros from 1959. However, this intention of social criticism and realism of his first films was diluted as the director and Sarli acquired national and international recognition, replacing them with traditional melodrama, crime and picaresque, where the erotic scenes "acquired their own autonomy." Nevertheless, in a 1974 interview for magazine Siete Días Bó still claimed that his films "deal with social issues, but since Isabel acts in them, sex has implications in the argument." The social problem depicted in Carne is that of violence; it might even be argued that the film seeks to draw attention to violence against women. In this matter, Bó stated:

What was inside that truck was not a person. It was meat, nothing but meat. Because if those guys had seen the soul, the suffering of that woman, they would not have done it. I tried to make a parameter, between the meat that we consume every day and the meat as a sexual object.

In addition to violence, love plays a leading role in the film: it appears a common thread that "moves the protagonists to be together, to have sexual relations, to express their desires, and it is also what allows Delicia to move forward despite the rapes." This is explicitly the message that Bó wanted to give with the film, with a text reading at the conclusion: "The true pure love, without concessions, and the goodness of God will triumph over the violence and the wave of terror that invades the world." With Carne, on the one hand, Bó seeks to denounce the violence and drama to which the worker is subjected and, on the other, to exalt the values of family, progress, work and love.

Carne inaugurated a new era of "excess" in Bó and Sarli's filmography.

== Legacy ==
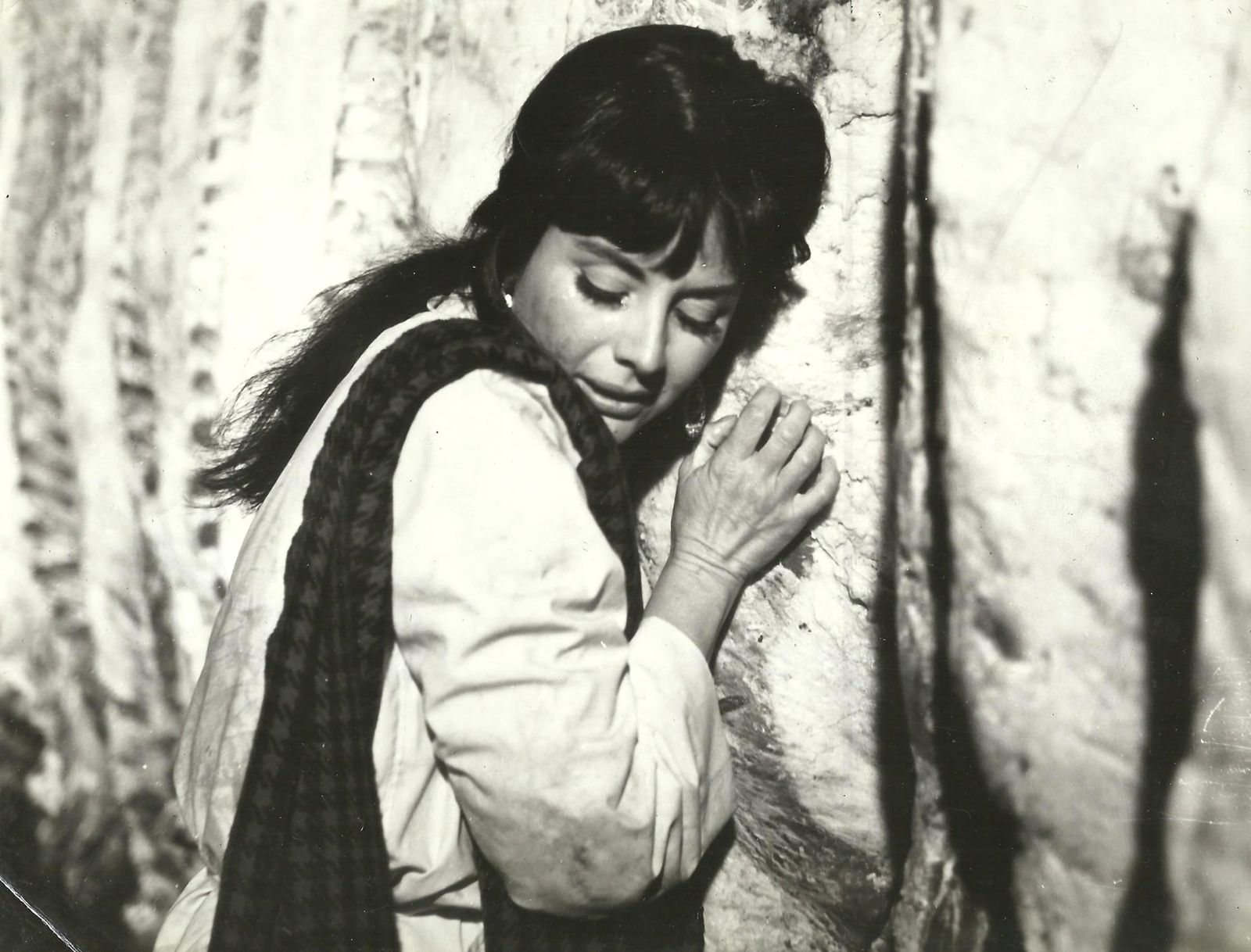
Delicia (Sarli) hiding behind meat during the iconic "Meat on meat" rape scene.

One of the most emblematic films by Bó and Sarli, Carne is considered a landmark in their filmography. The Spanish edition of Vanity Fair described it in 2017 as "their masterpiece". Years after its release, especially since the democratic stability that began with the presidency of Raúl Alfonsín in 1983, their work—including films such as Carne, Fiebre, Una mariposa en la noche and Desnuda en la arena—began to be revalued as cult classics and pop icons. In 2015, Télam placed Carne at number 4 in its list of "20 classic films of erotic cinema", considering it "the total representation" of Bó's work. Regarding the film's cultural influence in Argentina, the news agency stated: "Something very striking happens with this film: it is present in our memory without necessarily having seen it, a total synthesis of the popularity of the dame of national erotic cinema. A couple of phrases have remained in history." One of these phrases is "canalla ¿qué pretende usted de mí?" (English: "scoundrel, what do you want from me?"), commonly attributed to Sarli's character before being raped in a truck. Although the phrase is "engraved in Argentine popular culture", it was actually never said in the film, constituting "a true popular myth." The scene in which Sarli is raped on a piece of beef as the perpetrator cries "Carne sobre carne" (English: "Meat on meat") constitutes the defining moment of the film and is widely remembered in Argentine cinephilia. "Carne sobre carne" has been considered "the most famous phrase that has come out of [Bó's] characters."

Argentine rock band Bersuit Vergarabat recreated part of the film in their 2004 music video for "La argentinidad al palo". The group wanted to include the famous "¿qué pretende usted de mí?" quote, so they had to contact Sarli to "record it and paraph it once and for all." The 2007 documentary film Carne sobre carne, directed by Diego Curubeto, takes its name from Carne and features scenes from the film. American director John Waters claims to be a great admirer of Carne and has cited the films of Bó and Sarli as an inspiration. He told Mariano Kairuz of Página/12 in 2012:

"Armando Bo and Isabel Sarli are like Joseph von Sternberg and Marlene Dietrich," he says enthusiastically.

Maybe a little less elegant...

–Not for me! When we play their movies here, people laugh with them, not at them: you can tell Armando was absolutely fascinated with this goddess, and there was nothing ironic in them, in any case they were pieces from another era, great innocent sex films, politically incorrect for our current standards. I also love this other movie, I think it's called Carne, when Isabel walks to her work in a meat packing plant every day following the train tracks in high heels and with the complete look of a prostitute..

== See also ==
- 1968 in film
- Exploitation film
- List of Argentine films of 1968
- Nudity in film
- Rape and revenge film
- Sex in film
