= List of Argentine films of 1964 =

A list of films produced in Argentina in 1964:

Argentine films of 1964
Title	Director	Release	Genre
A - C
Aconcagua	Leo Fleider	18 June	
Acosada	Alberto Du Bois	10 September	
Bettina	Rubén W. Cavallotti	27 February	
La Boda	Lucas Demare	26 March	
Buenas noches, Buenos Aires	Hugo del Carril	1 October	
Canuto Cañete y los 40 ladrones	Leo Fleider	2 July	
Carlos Gardel, historia de un ídolo	Solly	16 April	
Circe	Manuel Antín	30 April	
Cleopatra era Cándida	Julio Saraceni	23 April	
El Club del Clan	Enrique Carreras	12 March	
Cuidado con las colas	Julio Saraceni	12 November	
Los culpables	José María Forqué	25 June	
D - M
El Demonio en la sangre	René Mugica	19 June	
El desastrólogo	Carlos Rinaldi	26 February	Comedy
La diosa impura	Armando Bó	5 November	
Disloque en Mar del Plata	Conrado Diana	20 August	Comedy
Los evadidos	Enrique Carreras	14 May	
Extraña ternura	Daniel Tinayre	24 September	
El gordo Villanueva	Julio Saraceni	11 June	Comedy
La gran carrera	Paul Rouger and Máximo Berrondo	19 March	
La herencia	Ricardo Alventosa	10 December	
La leona	Armando Bó	17 September	
Lujuria tropical	Armando Bó	2 January	
María M.	Emilio Vieyra	15 October	
Mujeres perdidas	Rubén W. Cavallotti	13 August	
O - Z
El octavo infierno, cárcel de mujeres	René Mugica	20 August	
Placeres conyugales	Luis Saslavsky	8 July	
Primero yo	Fernando Ayala	19 February	
La sentencia	Hugo del Carril	10 June	
Sombras en el cielo	Juan Berend	17 September	
La Tigra	Leopoldo Torre Nilsson	10 September	
Tres alcobas	Enrique Carreras	24 September	
Tres historias fantásticas	Marcos Madanes	Hugo del Carril	
Tú y yo somos tres	Rafael Gil	30 January	
Un momento muy largo	Piero Vivarelli	5 March	
Un soltero en apuros	Alberto Du Bois	19 November	
Un sueño y nada más	Diego Santillán	Inédito	
Un Viaje al más allá	Enrique Carreras	28 May	

== External links and references ==
- Argentine films of 1964 at the Internet Movie Database
