= Paco Jamandreu =

Argentine fashion designer and actor

- Born: October 17, 1925; Veinticinco de Mayo Partido, Buenos Aires Province, Argentina
- Died: March 9, 1995 (aged 69); Buenos Aires, Argentina
- Occupations: Fashion designer, custom designer

Francisco Vicente Jaumandreu, also known as Paco Jamandreu (October 17, 1925 – March 9, 1995) was an Argentine fashion designer and actor. He was a friend of Eva Perón and served as a costume designer on several Argentine films.

== Early life ==
Jamandreu was born on October 17, 1925, on a farm in Veinticinco de Mayo Partido, Buenos Aires Province, Argentina. His father, Francesc Jaumandreu, worked for a local newspaper and his mother, Herminia Giogia, was a school teacher. His grandmother was Spanish. Jamandreu moved to Buenos Aires in the 1930s.

== Career ==
Jamandreu began his career as a fashion writer for Tiempo Argentino, Selecta, and El Hogar. He made his debut as a movie costume designer in 1942, working for leading lady Zully Moreno in a movie named Historia de crímenes ("Crime Story"). He followed that by designing for El muerto falta a la cita ("The Dead One Missed the Appointment"), released in 1944, and in 1947's El misterioso Tío Silas ("The Mysterious Uncle Silas").

Jamandreu first met Eva Duarte before she married populist leader Juan Perón in 1945. Their relationship was initially of a business nature, and Jamandreu began a long series of designs for the actress and, later, First Lady. He became her confidant, and vice versa. His friendship with Eva Perón was dramatized in Juan Carlos Desanzo's Eva Perón: The True Story (1996); he was portrayed by actor Horacio Roca. Before her death in 1952, he was asked by Perón to design sketches of dresses to make her feel better.

Following a relative absence from Argentine cinema credits during the 1950s, Jamandreu became more active as film fashion designer during the 1960s thanks to Isabel Sarli, for whom he designed costumes in Carne and Embrujada. He also acted in her 1980 movie named Una Viuda descocada ("A Crazy Widow"). In 1986, he acted in Soy paciente ("I'm Patient"), but that film was never released because the producers could not finish recording it.

In 1996, Jamandreu's last work as a film costume designer was displayed in Argentine theaters, when Amor de otoño, directed by José Conrado Castelli, was released. Jamandreu had been working on Amor de otoño by the time of his death.

Jamandreu authored two books: a memoir and another book about his friendship with Perón.

== Personal life and death ==
Jamandreu, who admitted his homosexuality to his father at age 15, became known among friend and clients not only for his talent, but also for his candor. According to Eva Perón: The True Story, Jamandreu admitted to Ms. Perón that he was homosexual, telling her that "being homosexual in Argentina is just like being poor." He was arrested and sent to prison for it several times, and bailed out by Perón.

Jamandreu died from a heart attack, on March 9, 1995, in Buenos Aires.

== Works ==
- Jamandreu, Paco (1975). La cabeza contra el suelo : memorias. Buenos Aires: d. de la Flor. OCLC 839840687.
- Jamandreu, Paco (1983). Evita fuera del balcón. Ediliba. OCLC 912795359.
