= Américo Hoss =

Hungarian-Argentine cinematographer

Américo Hoss (29 February 1914 in Budapest, Hungary - 20 October 1990 in Buenos Aires, Argentina) was a prolific Hungarian-Argentine cinematographer.

Hoss worked on over 90 films in his career between 1947 and 1980.

He died on October 20, 1990, in Buenos Aires, Argentina.

== Filmography ==
- Los hijos del otro (1947)
- La cumparsita (1947)
- No me digas adiós (1947)
- La dama del collar (1947)
- Las aventuras de Jack (1948)
- La barra de la esquina (1950)
- Campeón a la fuerza (1950)
- No me digas adiós (1950)
- El ladrón canta boleros (1950)
- Paraíso robado (1951)
- El hermoso Brummel (1951)
- Buenos Aires, mi tierra querida (1951)
- Volver a la vida (1951)
- Mi vida por la tuya (1951)
- Donde comienzan los pantanos (1952)
- Stella Maris (1953)
- Detective (1954)
- Casada y señorita (1954)
- La telaraña (1954)
- Se necesita un hombre con cara de infeliz (1954)
- El cartero (1954)
- La delatora (1955)
- Concierto para una lágrima (1955)
- En carne viva (1955)
- Ensayo final (1955)
- Pobre pero honrado (1955)
- Música, alegría y amor (1955)
- Pecadora (1956)
- Música, alegría y amor (1956)
- África ríe (1956)
- Luces de candilejas (1956)
- De noche también se duerme (1956)
- Spring of Life (1957)
- Sección desaparecidos (1958)
- Alto Paraná (1958)
- Socios para la aventura (1958)
- Una cita con la vida (1958)
- Las tierras blancas (1958)
- Mi esqueleto (1959)
- El candidato (1959)
- Salitre (1959)
- Culpable (1960)
- Obras maestras del terror (1960)
- Los asesinos las prefieren rubias (1961)
- La maestra enamorada (1961)
- Tercer mundo (1961)
- Libertad bajo palabra (1961)
- Una americana en Buenos Aires (1961)
- El mago de las finanzas (1962)
- Cristóbal Colón en la Facultad de Medicina (1962)
- El noveno mandamiento (1962)
- Socia de alcoba (1962)
- Il mondo sulle spiaggie (Documentary) (Italia) (1962)
- Carnaval del crimen (1962)
- Canuto Cañete, conscripto del siete (1963)
- La calesita (1963)
- Cleopatra era Cándida (1964)
- La herencia (1964)
- El gordo Villanueva (1964)
- Circe (1964)
- Proceso a la ley (Inédita) (1964)
- Esquiú, una luz en el sendero (1965)
- Canuto Cañete, detective privado (1965)
- Nacidos para cantar (1965)
- Muchachos impacientes (1965)
- La pérgola de las flores (1965)
- El galleguito de la cara sucia (1966)
- ¡Cómo te extraño...! (1966)
- La mujer de tu prójimo (1966)
- La cigarra está que arde (1967)
- Tacuara y Chamorro, pichones de hombre (1967)
- Las pirañas (1967)
- Escándalo en la familia (1967)
- Humo de marihuana (1968)
- El día que me quieras (1969)
- El bulín (1969)
- En una playa junto al mar (1971)
- El caradura y la millonaria (1971)
- Las píldoras (1972)
- Fiebre (1972)
- Furia infernal (1973)
- Lucharon sin armas (1973)
- Los caballeros de la cama redonda (1973)
- Los doctores las prefieren desnudas (1973)
- Rolando Rivas, taxista (1974)
- El sexo y el amor (1974)
- Intimidades de una cualquiera (1974)
- Carmiña (Su historia de amor) (1975)
- Solamente ella (1975)
- Un mundo de amor (1975)
- Embrujada (1976)
- Una mariposa en la noche (1977)
- Las aventuras de Pikín (1977)
- El divorcio está de moda (de común acuerdo) (1978)
- El último amor en Tierra del Fuego (1979)
- Alejandra, mon amour (1979)
- Insaciable (1979)
- No apto para menores (1979)
- El diablo metió la pata (1980)
- Operación Comando (1980)
