= Víctor Bó =

Argentine actor and film producer

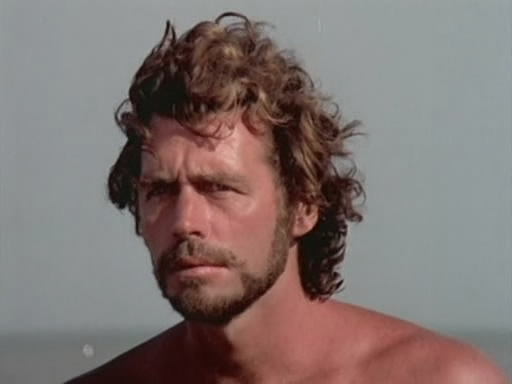
- Bó in Los Superagentes y el Tesoro Maldito (1978)
- Born: 8 April 1943 (age 83)
- Occupations: Actor, film producer
- Children: Armando Bó
- Relatives: Armando Bó (father); Nicolás Giacobone (nephew)

Víctor Bó (born 8 April 1943) is an Argentine retired actor and film producer. He is the son of classic actor and director Armando Bó, who directed Bó Junior in several films in which he co-starred with his father's muse, Isabel Sarli. He is also the father and uncle of filmmakers and Academy Award Winners for Best Original Screenplay Armando Bo and Nicolás Giacobone, respectively.

== Biography ==
Bó broke into acting aged 16 in 1959, in the film ... y el Demonio creó a los hombres, and costarred in several films directed by his father and starring Isabel Sarli. In 1971 he appeared in Así es Buenos Aires, and achieved greater fame as one of the protagonists in the Superagentes ("Super Agents") saga of spy-adventure films (1974–1983). He played villain roles for two movies in a series of nine sword and sorcery films that Roger Corman produced in Argentina during the 1980s, in association with Aries Cinematográfica Argentina: Deathstalker (1983) and the classic B-movie Barbarian Queen (1984).

Bó started to distance himself from acting after the release of the comic-based comedy film Las Puertitas del señor López (1988), and turned into film production. He helped produce two movies directed by Jorge Polaco: the controversial cult film Kindergarten (1989), which was deemed "obscene", "bordering on pornography" and censored by a judge's order at the time of its release, resulting in a 30-year ban for the film, which was officially released in 2010; and the black comedy Siempre es difícil volver a casa (1992), which was a critical and commercial failure at the time of its release, but has slowly gained some critical reappraisal over the years.

Except for a few roles on TV series or documentary interviews, and a supporting role in a new Superagentes film (Los superagentes, nueva generación, 2008), Bó has been mostly retired from the filmmaking world in any capacity, focusing instead in being interviewed and appearing in film retrospectives and showings dedicated to his father Armando's body of work.

== Filmography ==
=== Actor ===
- Y el demonio creó a los hombres (1959)
- Pelota de cuero (1963)
- La Tentación desnuda (1966) (as Víctor Bó) as Cholo
- La señora del intendente (1967) as Rosendo Fernández
- La Mujer de mi padre (1968) as Mario
- Carne (1968) as Antonio
- Embrujada (1969) as Juan
- Desnuda en la arena (1969)
- Los Mochileros (1970)
- Los Neuróticos (1971)
- Así es Buenos Aires (1971)
- Yo gané el prode, ¿y usted? (1973)
- Hipólito y Evita (1973)
- Furia infernal (1973) as Land owner's older son
- La Gran aventura (1974) as Hércules
- La Super, super aventura (1975)
- La Aventura explosiva (1977)
- Los Superagentes biónicos (1977)
- Una Mariposa en la noche (1977)
- Los Superagentes y el tesoro maldito (1978)
- Los Superagentes no se rompen (1979)
- Hormiga negra (1979)
- La Aventura de los paraguas asesinos (1979)
- El Último amor en Tierra del Fuego (1979)
- Los Superagentes contra todos (1980)
- Los Superagentes y la gran aventura del oro (1980)
- Superagentes y titanes (1983) as Delfín
- Deathstalker (1983) as Kang
- Barbarian Queen (1985) as Strymon
- Los Superagentes contra los fantasmas (1986)
- Las Puertitas del señor López (1988)
- Los superagentes, nueva generación (2008)

== Television appearances ==
- El Sodero de mi vida (a.k.a. The Bubbleman of My Life; 2001) as Verónica's husband
