= El Trueno entre las hojas =

El trueno entre las hojas meaning ("Thunder Among the Leaves") may refer to:

- El Trueno entre las hojas (book), a 1953 collection of short stories by Augusto Roa Bastos
- Thunder Among the Leaves (Spanish: El trueno entre las hojas), a 1958 Argentine drama film directed by Armando Bó
