= List of Argentine films of 1977 =

A list of films produced in Argentina in 1977:

Argentine films of 1977
Title	Director	Release	Genre
A - L
Así es la vida	Enrique Carreras	19 May	drama
La aventura explosiva	Orestes A. Trucco	24 February	
Las Aventuras de Pikín	Alberto Abdala	21 July	
Basta de mujeres	Hugo Moser	31 March	
Brigada en acción	Palito Ortega	21 July	
El Casamiento de Laucha	Enrique Dawi	18 August	
Crecer de golpe	Sergio Renán	30 June	
El Gordo catástrofe	Hugo Moser	8 September	
Hay que parar la delantera	Rafael Cohen	7 July	
Jacinta Pichimauida se enamora	Enrique Cahen Salaberry	6 January	
Las locas	Enrique Carreras	21 April	
M - Z
La Nueva cigarra	Fernando Siro	2 June	
La Obertura	Julio Saraceni	29 September	
Los Pequeños aventureros	Daniel Pires Mateus	1 September	
El productor de espectáculos	Martin Maisler		
¿Qué es el otoño?	David José Kohon	5 May	
Saverio el cruel	Ricardo Wullicher	1 September	
El soltero	Carlos Borcosque (hijo)	17 March	
Los superagentes biónicos	Adrián Quiroga	11 August	
Las turistas quieren guerra	Enrique Cahen Salaberry	16 June	
Una Mariposa en la noche	Armando Bó	15 September	
Un toque diferente	Hugo Sofovich	4 August	

== External links and references ==
- Argentine films of 1977 at the Internet Movie Database
