= La Mujer de mi padre =

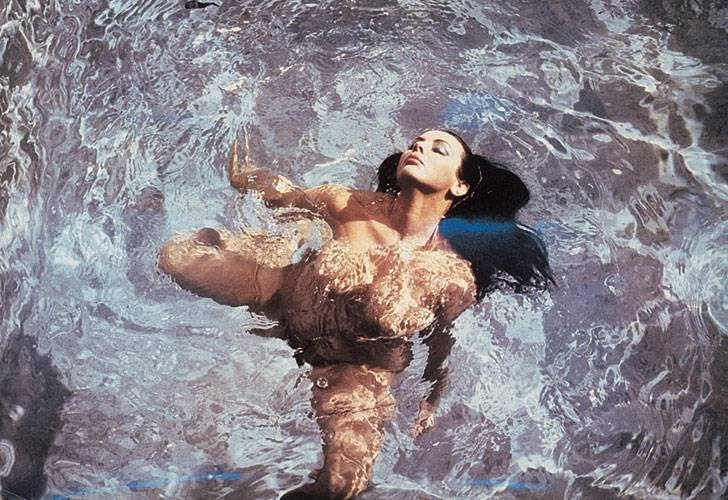
- Still image from a scene of the film, featuring a naked Sarli swimming.
- Directed by: Armando Bó
- Written by: Armando Bó
- Produced by: Armando Bó
- Starring: Isabel Sarli; Víctor Bó; Armando Bó; Mario Lozano
- Cinematography: Aníbal González Paz
- Edited by: Rosalino Caterbetti
- Music by: Armando Bó
- Release date: 1968
- Running time: 84 minute
- Country: Argentina
- Language: Spanish

La Mujer de mi padre ("My Father's Woman", also translatable as "My Father's Mistress") is a 1968 Argentine sexploitation drama film directed by Armando Bó and starring Isabel Sarli, Víctor Bó and Armando Bó.
