= Juan José Míguez =

Argentine actor (1918–1995)

Juan José Miguez
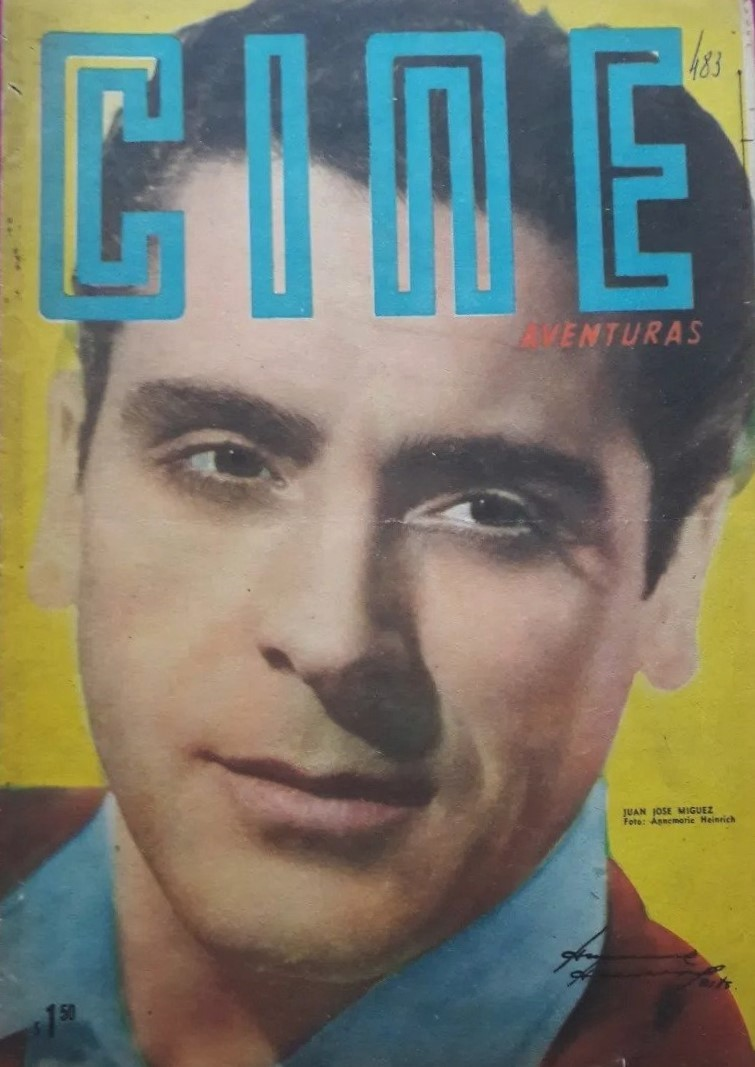
- Juan José Miguez (1956)
- Born: 1918; Argentina
- Died: 1 September 1995 (aged 76–77); Buenos Aires, Argentina
- Occupation: Actor
- Years active: 1943-1983 (film)

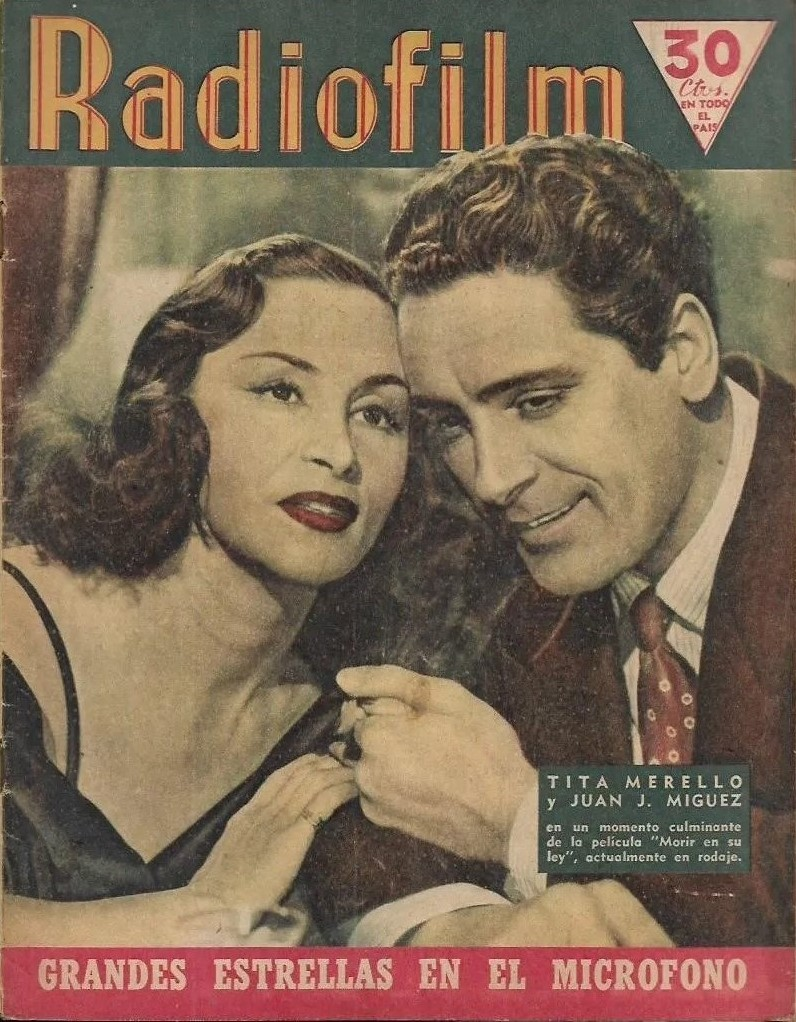
Tita Merello and Juan José Miguez (1949)

Juan José Miguez (1918–1995) was an Argentine actor. He appeared in more than thirty films during his career including co-starring alongside Eva Perón in The Prodigal (1946) during the Golden Age of Argentine Cinema. Later in his career he appeared several times in Isabel Sarli films. Miguez also appeared frequently on the television, stage and radio. He was married to the actress Lia Casanova.

== Selected filmography ==
- Three Men of the River (1943)
- El Fin de la Noche (1944)
- The Circus Cavalcade (1945)
- The Prodigal (1946)
- Musical Romance (1947)
- Santos Vega Returns (1947)
- Juan Mondiola (1950)
- Valentina (1950)
- Emergency Ward (1952)
- Plaza Huincul (Pozo Uno) (1960)
- The Horny Days (1973)
- A Butterfly in the Night (1977)

== Bibliography ==
- Mizraje, María Gabriela. Argentinas de Rosas a Perón. Editorial Biblos, 1999.
