= A Butterfly in the Night =

- Directed by: Armando Bó
- Written by: Armando Bó
- Produced by: Armando Bó
- Cinematography: Américo Hoss
- Music by: Armando Bó
- Production company: Sociedad Independiente Filmadora Argentina (S.I.F.A.)
- Release date: 15 September 1977
- Running time: 95 minutes
- Country: Argentina
- Language: Spanish

A Butterfly in the Night (Spanish: Una mariposa en la noche) is a 1977 Argentine comedy-drama film directed by and starring Armando Bo alongside Isabel Sarli.

== Cast ==
- Isabel Sarli as Yvonne
- Armando Bo as Jorge
- Víctor Bó as Lorenzo
- Vicente Rubino as Vicente
- Juan José Miguez as Pedro
- Horacio Bruno as the pirate
- Claude Marting as policeman
- Mario Casado as Cholo
- Adelco Lanza as Manolo
- Carlos Lagrotta as Escrilano
- Enrique Vargas
- Nino Udine
- Pancho Jiménez
- Arturo Noal
- Juan Carlos Cevallos
