= La Burrerita de Ypacaraí =

1962 film

- Directed by: Armando Bó
- Release date: 1962
- Running time: 95 minute
- Country: Argentina
- Language: Spanish

La Burrerita de Ypacaraí is a 1962 Argentine film. The film contains music and an appearance from Paraguayan singer Luis Alberto del Paraná. Also was the first Argentinian film to be dubbed in French.

== Plot ==
Beautiful farmer's daughter Isabel can have any man in the village, but she falls in love with the wrong man and his sins cost both of them their lives at the Iguazú Falls.

== Cast ==
- Isabel Sarli as Isabel
- Ernesto Báez as Vergara
- Armando Bó as Quiroga
- Luis Alberto del Parana as Luis
