= La señora del intendente =

- Pot for the film
- Written by: Armando Bó
- Story by: Armando Bó
- Starring: Isabel Sarli and Pepe Arias
- Cinematography: Alfredo Traverso
- Music by: Elijio Ayala Morín
- Production company: Sociedad Independiente Filmadora Argentina
- Release date: 1967
- Running time: 90 minutes
- Country: Argentina
- Language: Spanish

La señora del intendente (The mayor's wife) is a 1967 Argentine comedy film directed by Armando Bó and starring Isabel Sarli and Pepe Arias. The film had a sequel "Una Viuda descocada" (1980), which was Bó's last film.

== Production ==
The 90-minute comedy film was made in 1967 for Sociedad Independiente Filmadora Argentina by director Armando Bó. The script was by Armando Bó and music by Elijio Ayala Morín. The film was shot entirely in San Pedro, Buenos Aires Province. This was the last film in which Pepe Arias appeared, and was released after his death. He looks tired beside Isabel Sarli.

== Synopsis ==
The film is one of several made by Bó that depicted stupid men who desire Isabel Sarli, others being La mujer del zapatero and La viuda descocada. The characters that Sarli plays exploit men's lust to obtain money and power. The comedies, set in villages, take the form of a series of sketches with an improvisational element, similar to classical stage revues.

In La señora del intendente Flor Tetis (Isabel Sarli) has the entire male population of the small village of "Ombú Quemado" under her thumb. The local doctor, Amable Gambetta (Pepe Arias), offers to marry her, since it will improve his chances of being elected mayor. Soon the combination of her sexual demands and political problems make him want to resign. There is a strong political element in the film, made at a time when Peronism was banned. Reality intrudes into the action. In one scene, a committee of censors arrives at the mayor's office to ban presentation of a cycle of films by Bó starring Sarli.

== Complete cast ==
The complete cast was:

- Isabel Sarli
- Pepe Arias
- Pepita Muñoz
- Victor Bó
- Héctor Calcaño
- Oscar Valicelli
- Semillita
- Adelco Lanza
- Inés Murray
