= My Days with Gloria =

- Film poster
- Spanish: Mis días con Gloria
- Directed by: Juan José Jusid
- Written by: Laura Cuffini; José Menchaca; Santiago Fernández Calvete (collaborating writer); Mariano Starosta
- Starring: Isabel Sarli; Luis Luque; Nicolás Repetto; Isabelita Sarli
- Music by: Federico Jusid
- Distributed by: SP Films
- Release date: March 2010 (Pantalla Pinamar Festival)
- Country: Argentina
- Language: Spanish

My Days with Gloria (Spanish: Mis días con Gloria) is a 2010 Argentine crime drama film directed by Juan José Jusid and starring Isabel Sarli and Luis Luque. The film was the official comeback of Isabel Sarli from acting after a ten plus years hiatus following La Dama Regresa (1996). It received mixed reviews.

== Cast ==
- Isabel Sarli as Gloria Saten
- Luis Luque as Roberto
- Nicolás Repetto as Teniente Crinal
- Isabelita Sarli as Rita
