= Dottie Gets Spanked =

Dottie Gets Spanked is a sexual comedy television short film released in 1993. It was written and directed by Todd Haynes, and produced by Christine Vachon, Lauren Zalaznick, Craig Paull, and James Schamus. It was featured in John Waters Presents Movies That Will Corrupt You.

== Cast ==
- J. Evan Bonifant as Steven Gale (as Evan Bonifant)
- Barbara Garrick as Lorraine Gale
- Julie Halston as Dottie Frank
- Robert Pall as Steven's father
- Harriet Sansom Harris as Sharon's mother (as Harriet Harris)
