= Não Me Digas Adeus =

1947 film directed by Luis Moglia Barth

- Directed by: Luis Moglia Barth
- Screenplay by: Joracy Comargo
- Cinematography: Hugo Chiesa, Américo Hoss
- Edited by: José Gallego
- Music by: George Andreani
- Production company: São Miguel Filmes
- Distributed by: Marte Filmes
- Release date: 1947
- Countries: Brazil, Argentina
- Languages: Spanish, Portuguese

Não Me Digas Adeus (Spanish: No me digas adios) is a 1947 Argentine-Brazilian romantic musical film directed by Luis Moglia Barth during the classical era of Argentine cinema. The film was shot in Petrópolis, Rio de Janeiro (state).

== Cast ==
- Linda Batista
- Lourdinha Bittencourt
- Luiz Bonfá
- Moraes Cardoso
- Darcy Cazarré
- Older Cazarré
- Hugo Chemin
- Manuel Collado
- Pablo Cumo
- Regina Célia
- Nelly Darén
- Luz del Fuego
- Anselmo Duarte
- Josefina Díaz
- Oswaldo de Moraes Eboli
