= La Leona (film) =

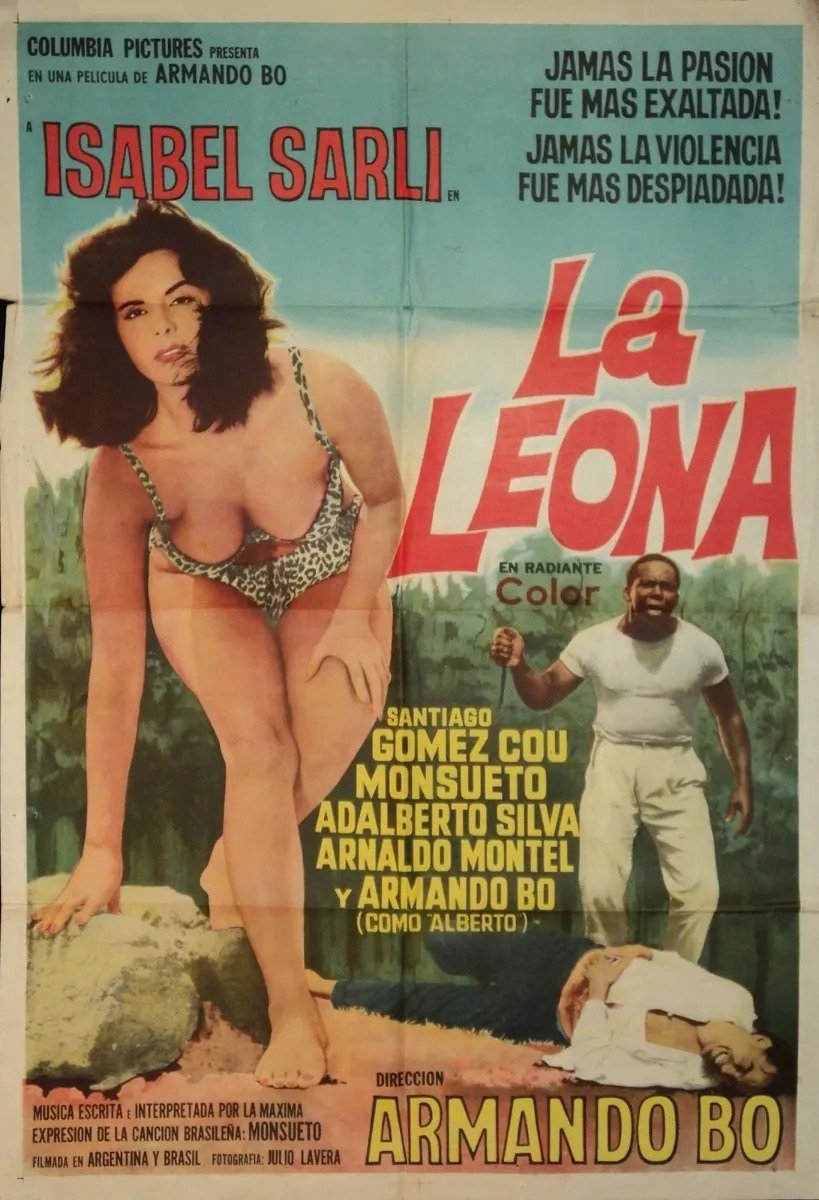
- Directed by: Armando Bó
- Written by: Armando Bó
- Produced by: Armando Bó
- Starring: Armando Bó; Isabel Sarli
- Cinematography: Julio C. Lavera
- Edited by: Rosalino Caterbeti, Jorge Levillotti
- Music by: Elijio Ayala Morín, Armando Bó, Monsueto
- Release date: 17 September 1964
- Running time: 93 minutes
- Country: Argentina
- Language: Spanish

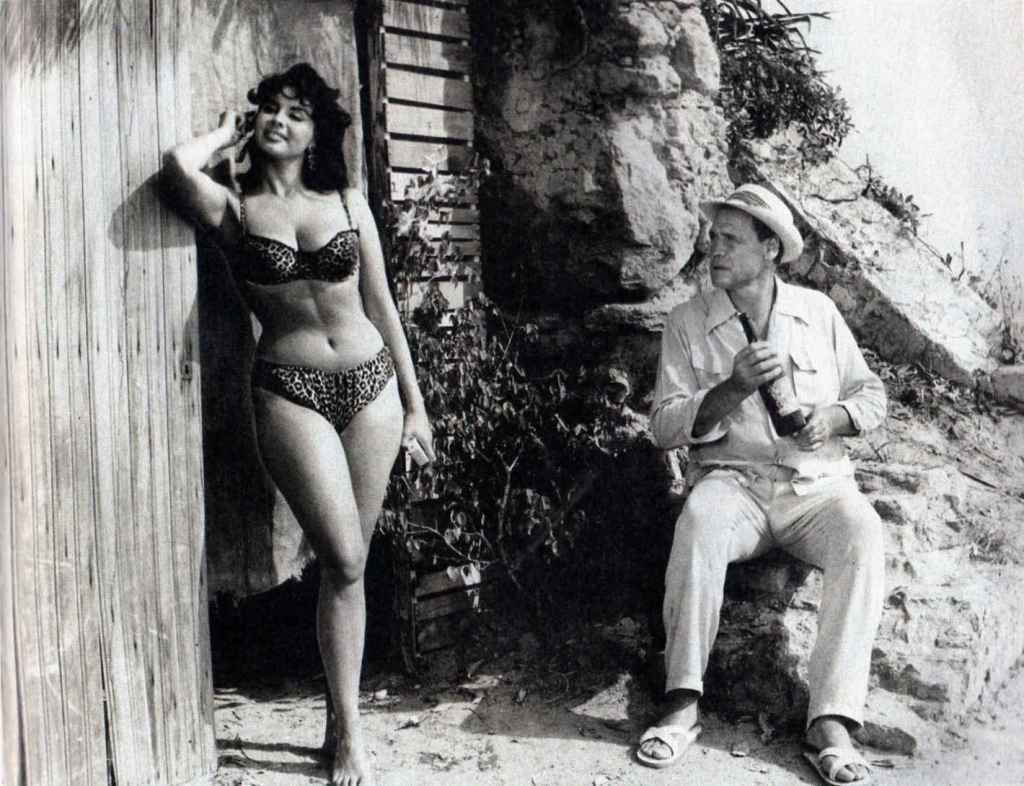
Isabel Sarli and Armando Bó

La Leona is a 1964 Argentine film directed by and starring Armando Bó with Isabel Sarli.

== Cast ==
- Isabel Sarli
- Armando Bó
- Santiago Gómez Cou
- Mónica Grey
- Monsueto
- Arnaldo Montel
- Gilberto Sierra
- Adalberto Silva
