= Una Viuda descocada =

- Directed by: Armando Bó
- Written by: Armando Bó
- Produced by: Armando Bó
- Starring: Isabel Sarli; José Marrone; Jorge Barreiro
- Cinematography: Pedro Marzialetti
- Edited by: Vicente Castagno; Roselino Caterbetti
- Music by: Eligio Ayala Morin; Armando Bó; Julio Presas (songs); Luis Alberto del Paraná (songs)
- Production company: Sociedad Independiente Filmadora Argentina (S.I.F.A.)
- Distributed by: Films AM
- Release date: 1980
- Running time: 95 minutes
- Country: Argentina
- Language: Spanish

Una Viuda descocada is a 1980 Argentine comedy film written and directed by Armando Bó and starring Isabel Sarli. It is a sequel to the Bó's 1967 film La señora del intendente and it was also the last film he directed before his death.

== Synopsis ==
The alluring, vivacious, and stunning Flor Tetis Soutién de Gambetta (Sarli), a flamboyant femme fatale, has recently been widowed for the eighth time. Her vast fortune has gradually dwindled, leaving her on the brink of ruin. However, her fortunes take an unexpected turn when she encounters a benevolent newspaper vendor, Pepe Mangiabróccoli (Marrone), who, out of nowhere, becomes a millionaire by winning the lottery and falls head over heels in love with her.

== Cast ==
- Isabel Sarli as Flor Tetis Soutién de Gambetta
- José Marrone as Pepe Mangiabróccoli
- Jorge Barreiro as Carlos
- Vicente Rubino as Vicente Rodríguez Luque
- Pepita Muñoz as Doña Flora de Tetis
- Elena Lucena as La primera chismosa
- Adelco Lanza as Manolo
