= The Female: Seventy Times Seven =

1962 film

- Theatrical release poster
- Directed by: Leopoldo Torre Nilsson
- Written by: Ricardo Becher; Beatriz Guido; Ricardo Luna; Dalmiro Sáenz
- Based on: El Prostíbulo and Sur viejo by Dalmiro Sáenz
- Produced by: Antonio Motti
- Starring: Isabel Sarli
- Cinematography: Ricardo Younis
- Edited by: Jacinto Cascales
- Release date: 30 August 1962
- Running time: 92 minutes
- Country: Argentina
- Language: Spanish

The Female: Seventy Times Seven (Spanish: Setenta veces siete) is a 1962 Argentine drama film directed by Leopoldo Torre Nilsson starring Isabel Sarli. It was entered into the 1962 Cannes Film Festival.

== Cast ==
- Isabel Sarli as Cora / Laura
- Francisco Rabal as Pascual / The Sheepherder
- Jardel Filho as Pedro / The Horsethief
- Blanca Lagrotta as The Mother
- Ignacio Finder as The Father
- Nelly Prono as The Duena
- Jacobo Finder
- Hilda Suárez
- Alberto Barcel
- Walter Santa Ana
- Juan Carlos Berisso
- Berta Ortegosa

== US release ==
After 5 years, the film was picked up for distribution in the United States by Cambist Films. They re-edited the film and gave it a new name The Female with the director listed as Leo Towers. Sarli had refused to do nudity for this film, as she considered Torres Nilsson an "intellectual" director. But when the film was released in the US, scenes with a Sarli body double appeared nude. Sarli started a lawsuit against the distributors, but ended up losing since she continued to do nudes and did not damage her image. The film opened at Prudential's Tower Art in Milwaukee at Christmas 1967.

== Reception ==
The film was one of the highest-grossing "sex art" films in the United States.
