= Embrujada =

- Theatrical release poster
- Directed by: Armando Bó
- Written by: Armando Bo
- Produced by: Armando Bó
- Starring: Isabel Sarli
- Cinematography: Américo Hoss
- Edited by: Rosalino Caterbetti
- Music by: Luis Alberto del Paraná
- Release date: 1976
- Running time: 79
- Country: Argentina
- Language: Spanish

Embrujada is a 1976 Argentine sexploitation horror film directed by Armando Bó and Egídio Eccio.

== Cast ==
- Isabel Sarli as Ansisé
- Víctor Bó as Juan
- Daniel de Alvarado as Leandro
- C. Adolpho Chadler as Jacinto
- Miguel A. Olmos as Peralta
- Gilberto Sierra as Doctor
- Josefina Danieli as Doña Marculina
- Sonia Brasil as Mujer
