= La Diosa impura =

- Directed by: Armando Bó
- Written by: Alfredo Ruanova and Armando Bó
- Produced by: Carmelo Santiago
- Starring: Isabel Sarli
- Music by: Enrique Rodríguez
- Release date: 1963
- Running time: 104 minute
- Countries: Mexico; Argentina
- Language: Spanish

La Diosa impura is a 1963 Argentine-Mexican film, directed by Armando Bó and directed by Carmelo Santiago.

== Plot ==
Laura, played by Isabel Sarli runs away to Mexico after being implicated in a murder. There she meets a painter who asks her to pose for him. She later meets his brother, Julio played by Julio Alemán and falls in love but everything goes wrong when her mobster boyfriend comes looking for her.

== Cast ==
- Isabel Sarli as Laura
- Julio Alemán as Julio Molina Vargas
- Mario Lozano as Martín
- Víctor Junco as Pedro Molina Vargas
- Armando Bó as Reynoso
- Mario Casado as Martin's accomplice
