= Intimacies of a Prostitute =

1974 film by Armando Bó

- Directed by: Armando Bó
- Written by: Armando Bo and Dalmiro Sáenz
- Produced by: Armando Bo
- Starring: Isabel Sarli; Jorge Barreiro; Sabina Olmos
- Cinematography: Américo Hoss
- Edited by: Rosalino Caterbeti
- Music by: Los Iracundos
- Release date: 2 May 1974
- Running time: 90 minutes
- Country: Argentina
- Language: Spanish

Intimacies of a Prostitute (Spanish: Intimidades de una cualquiera) is a 1974 Argentine sexploitation drama film directed by Armando Bó and starring Isabel Sarli, Jorge Barreiro, and Sabina Olmos. Various dates of the release have been given, some as early as 1971 or 1972.

== Cast ==
- Isabel Sarli as Maria
- Jorge Barreiro as Pocho
- Sabina Olmos as Olga
- Guillermo Battaglia as Antonio
- Fidel Pintos as Hombre
- Ricardo Passano as Comisario
- Raúl del Valle as Correa
- Virginia Romay as Maria's mother
- Reynaldo Mompel as Carlos Moreno
- Horacio Bruno as Correntino
- Olanka Wolk as Betty
- Armando Bó as Jose Luis
