= Insaciable =

- Theatrical release poster
- Directed by: Armando Bó
- Written by: Armando Bó
- Produced by: Armando Bó
- Starring: Isabel Sarli; Jorge Barreiro; Santiago Gómez Cou; Armando Bó
- Cinematography: Américo Hoss
- Edited by: Víctor Villarreal
- Music by: Elijio Ayala Morín
- Production company: Sociedad Independiente Filmadora Argentina (S.I.F.A.)
- Release date: 1976
- Running time: 86 minutes
- Country: Argentina
- Language: Spanish

Insaciable (also known as The Insatiable Widow) is a 1976 Argentine erotic drama film written and directed by Armando Bó. It stars Isabel Sarli as a "worried nymphomaniac in search of satisfaction or cure". The film was highly controversial in Argentina due to its nudity and sexual content and lesbianism. This was played upon with a film poster documenting extracts from the Argentine press condemning the film and documenting those calling for it to be banned or censored.

== Cast ==
- Isabel Sarli
- Jorge Barreiro
- Santiago Gómez Cou
- Armando Bó
- Horacio Bruno
- Mario Casado
- Claude Marting
- Enrique Vargas
- Olga Walk
- Lechuguita
- Amelia Sanguinetti
