= Desnuda en la arena =

- Directed by: Armando Bó
- Written by: Armando Bó
- Starring: Isabel Sarli; Jorge Porcel
- Music by: Eligio Ayala Morín, Humberto Ubriaco
- Release date: 1969
- Running time: 87 minutes
- Country: Argentina
- Language: Spanish

Desnuda en la arena is a 1969 Argentine comedy film written and directed by Armando Bó. It stars sexploitation icon Isabel Sarli and comedian Jorge Porcel.

== Plot ==
The well known star of erotic movies, Isabel Sarli, plays Alicia, a single mother who moves to Panama and starts working as a stripper, deceiving men and making them the victims of her extortions.

== Cast ==
- Isabel Sarli
- Jorge Porcel
- Víctor Bó
- Mónica Grey
- Virginia Romay
- Eduardo Frangías
- Raúl del Valle
- Reynaldo Mompel
