= John Waters Presents Movies That Will Corrupt You =

- Series logo
- Starring: John Waters
- Country of origin: United States
- No. of seasons: 1
- No. of episodes: 13

Production
- Running time: Variable

Original release
- Network: here!

John Waters Presents Movies That Will Corrupt You is a film anthology series produced by here! in 2006. Shot on location in the Baltimore, Maryland home of director John Waters, each film is introduced by him and includes closing comments as well.

== Films showcased (in the series' premiere order) ==
- Freeway
- L.I.E.
- Fuego
- Baxter
- The Fluffer
- Clean, Shaven
- Beefcake
- Criminal Lovers
- The Hours and Times, Sissy Boy Slap Party, Dottie Gets Spanked
- Pink Narcissus
- Who Killed Pasolini? (Pasolini, un delitto italiano)
- Glowing Eyes
- Irréversible
