= Fiebre (film) =

1971 film by Armando Bó

- Japanese theatrical release poster
- Directed by: Armando Bó
- Written by: Armando Bó
- Produced by: Armando Bó
- Starring: Isabel Sarli; Armando Bó
- Cinematography: Américo Hoss
- Edited by: Rosalino Caterbeti
- Music by: Jorge Leone; Carlos Alonso
- Distributed by: Sociedad Independiente Filmadora Argentina
- Release dates: 24 June 1971 (USA); 22 June 1972 (Argentina)
- Running time: 90 minutes
- Country: Argentina
- Language: Spanish

Fiebre, also known as Fever, is a 1971 Argentine sexploitation film directed, produced and written by Armando Bó and starring Isabel Sarli. It was released on 22 June 1972 in Argentina. Fiebre is the name of the horse in the film.

== Plot ==
The two passions of a woman: horses and the man who caused her husband's suicide.

== Cast ==
- Isabel Sarli
- Armando Bó as Juan
- Horacio Priani as Fernando
- Mario Casado as Marco
- Álex Castillo
- Santiago Gómez Cou
- Adelco Lanza
- Claude Marting
- Juan José Míguez
- Pablo Moret
- Miguel Paparelli

== Reception ==
Eduardo Saglul in La Opinión said: "Equal distance from absurdism and realism, some feverish moments create a certain unreal climate". Manrupe and Portela write: "Quite a horse classic, listed that year in Variety as one of the 50 highest-grossing films in the world. It includes unmissable dream sequences."
