= Fuego (1969 film) =

- American theatrical release poster
- Directed by: Armando Bó
- Written by: Armando Bó
- Produced by: Armando Bó
- Starring: Isabel Sarli; Armando Bó
- Cinematography: Ricardo Younis
- Edited by: Rosalino Caterbetti
- Music by: Humberto Ubriaco; Armando Bó
- Production company: Sociedad Independiente Filmadora Argentina (S.I.F.A.)
- Distributed by: Haven International Pictures (U.S.)
- Release dates: 10 October 1969 (U.S.); 23 September 1971 (Argentina)
- Running time: 84 minutes
- Country: Argentina
- Language: Spanish

Fuego (Spanish for "fire") is a 1969 Argentine sexploitation film written, produced and directed by Armando Bó and starring Isabel Sarli. It is one of the many erotic films that the couple made between 1959 and 1980.

== Cast ==
- Isabel Sarli as Laura
- Armando Bó as Carlos
- Alba Mujica as Andrea
- Roberto Airaldi as Dr. Salazar
- Hugo Mujica as Jorge
- Oscar Valicelli as Mechanic
- Miguel A. Olmos as Driver

== Production ==
The film was shot between 1968 and 1969 in the Patagonian town of San Martín de los Andes and New York City.

Starting in 1968, the Sarli-Bo films began to focus more on sex. Columbia regularly called Bo to ask how many sex scenes were in the movie.

== Release ==
The film became the first Argentine film banned following new censorship rules under military dictator Juan Carlos Onganía. Advised by Jaime Cabouli, a well-known distributor, Bó and Sarli went to New York City with the film's negative where it was released, following a $150,000 publicity campaign, at the Rialto West and Rialto East on October 10, 1969.

== Critical reception ==
American film critic Roger Greenspun gave the film a positive review, writing in The New York Times that "Isabel Sarli squeezes more sexual frisson into the space between breathing in and breathing out than most of us could spread over a lifetime of ordinary love-making."

== Legacy ==
If you watch some of my films, you can see what a huge influence Fuego was. I forgot how much I stole. ... Look at Isabel's makeup and hairdo in Fuego. Dawn Davenport, Divine's character in [Female Trouble], could be her exact twin, only heavier. Isabel, you inspired us all to a life of cheap exhibitionism, exaggerated sexual desires and a love for all that is trash-ridden in cinema. We salute you, Isabel Sarli, a truly outstanding woman in film.

— John Waters, John Waters Presents Movies That Will Corrupt You, 2006.

Fuego has been considered "a milestone in the history of Argentine cinema" and one of Sarli's "erotic peaks". The relationship between Isabel Sarli and Alba Mujica's characters is one of the first representations of lesbianism in Argentine cinema. Lucía Brackes of Los Andes reflected in 2012 that "Coca is such a whore that she becomes a lesbian, a revolutionary and almost militant idea about the oppressed condition of women."

John Waters has declared himself a big fan of Sarli's films, citing Fuego as his favorite. He and Divine were admirers of Sarli and watched her movies in New York City's grindhouses. Waters presented Fuego as his annual selection in the 2002 Maryland Film Festival and featured it in his 2006 Here! network original series John Waters Presents Movies That Will Corrupt You, where he described it as "a hetero film for gay people to marvel at." The director and Sarli finally met in 2018 on the occasion of the BAFICI film festival in Buenos Aires, where he gave her an award for her career and interviewed her on video.

In 2010, the Film Society of Lincoln Center paid tribute to Sarli with a retrospective titled "Fuego: The Films of Isabel 'Coca' Sarli", screening five of her films in addition to Diego Curubeto's Carne Sobre Carne: Intimidades de Isabel Sarli, a documentary focusing on her career. Richard Corliss of Time wrote: "Seeing them today, nearly a half-century after they were made, a moviegoer thinks of lurid Hollywood love stories like Duel in the Sun, but with a much higher body temperature, and especially of Latin American telenovelas, those churning mixtures of female concupiscence and narrative coincidence. The world-class Spanish writer-director Pedro Almodóvar learned much from them, though it's not known if he used the Sarli-Bó films as his models."
