= Thunder Among the Leaves =

- Theatrical release poster
- Directed by: Armando Bó
- Written by: Augusto Roa Bastos
- Based on: La hija del ministro by Augusto Roa Bastos
- Produced by: Nicolas Bó
- Starring: Isabel Sarli; Armando Bó; Ernesto Báez; Andrés Laszlo
- Cinematography: Enrique Walfisch
- Edited by: Roselino Caterbetti
- Music by: Eladio Martínez; Emigdio Ayala Báez; Martín Leguizamón
- Distributed by: Films AM
- Release dates: July 1958 (First screening); October 1958 (National release)
- Running time: 99 minutes
- Countries: Argentina; Paraguay
- Languages: Spanish; Guaraní

Thunder Among the Leaves (Spanish: El trueno entre las hojas) is a 1958 Argentine-Paraguayan drama film directed by Armando Bó, starring himself, Isabel Sarli, Ernesto Báez and Andrés Laszlo. The screenplay by Paraguayan writer Augusto Roa Bastos was based on his short story La hija del ministro. Set in Paraguay, the story is about a strike at a sawmill.

The first film to feature full frontal nudity in Latin American cinema, Thunder Among the Leaves scandalized audiences and became a major box office success on the continent. It rocketed Sarli to stardom and is now considered a cult classic.

== Synopsis ==
The arrival of the boss's young wife unearths laborer tensions accumulated after many years of deprivation and maltreatment. The story is a social drama about the exploitation of man.

== Cast ==
- Armando Bó as Julio Guillén
- Isabel Sarli as Flavia Forkel
- Andrés Laszlo as Max Forkel
- Ernesto Báez as Capanga
- Félix Ribero
- Luis Leguisamón
- Eladio Martínez
- Leandro S. Cacavelos
- Roque Centurión Miranda
- Aníbal Romero
- Matías Ferreira Díaz
- Javier Franco
- Alejo Vargas
- Nieves Esquivel
- Tabú
- Adolfo Cuellar
- Luis Guastalla
- Kika Da Silva
- Manuel E. B. Argüello
- Guillermo Ketterer
- Rafael Rojas Doria
- Amador García
- César Alvarez Blanco

== Production ==
Sarli's inclusion in the film was inspired by Brigitte Bardot's role in And God Created Woman. Thunder Among the Leaves was filmed with the same camera used in Leopoldo Torres Ríos' Pelota de trapo in 1948 and Leopoldo Torre Nilsson's Días de odio in 1954.

During principal photography, Bó convinced Sarli to get naked in a scene in which she bathed in a lake though he had told her earlier that she would wear a flesh-colored bodystocking. Although Bó told Sarli they would shoot from afar, the camera lens had magnification.

== Reception ==
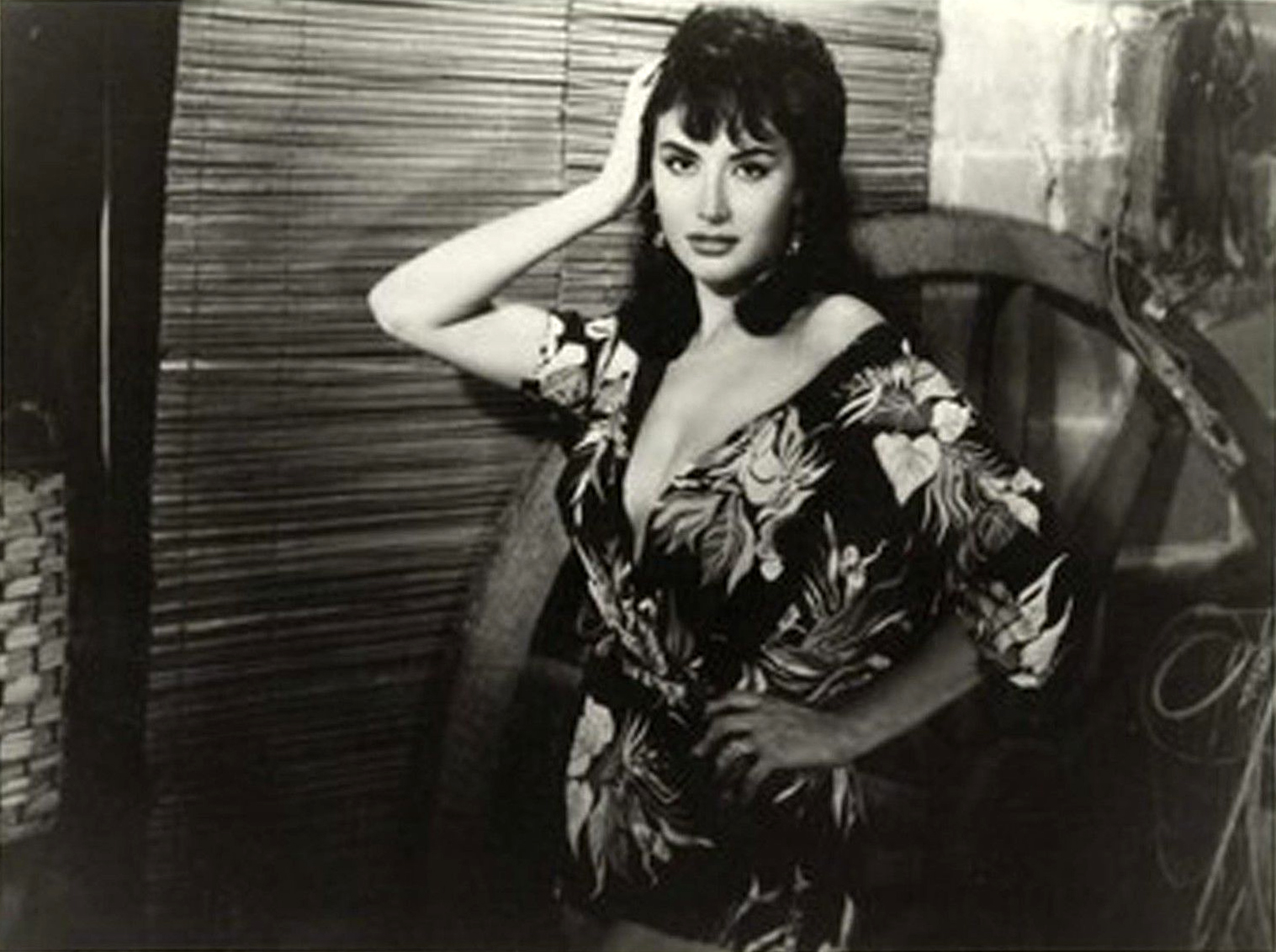
Isabel Sarli in a film still of Thunder Among the Leaves

Critic Gustavo J. Castagna felt that the aesthetic of Thunder Among the Leaves was reminiscent of the social commentary films by Hugo del Carril and Mario Soffici. Critic Sergio Wolf described Bó's films during this time as serial and each followed the generic pattern described by Arnold Hauser: the exaggerated and sharp, the harsh and exotic. Wolf said that Thunder Among the Leaves exhibits this pattern when Julio, who has nothing to lose, lets his passion boil over and rapes Flavia.

The film was a highly controversial box-office success. Argentine newspaper La Nación wrote in 1969 that the film left an extraordinary international mark and was one of Argentina's biggest blockbusters over recent years. In November 1958, The News and Courier reported that "a saucy Latin lass has smashed South American box office records with the most daring dunking since Hedy Lamarr disrobed to fame in Ecstasy." The movie's premiere in Montevideo, Uruguay, broke box office records, and Sarli's bath scene "rocked some Latin American capitals". In April 1959 Brian Bell of the Pittsburgh Post-Gazette wrote, "There was nothing particularly exciting about the movie except Miss Sarli, in a birthday suit swimming scene. It was a box office smash in South America." However, Sarli was panned by fellow filmmakers for the nude scene.

== Cultural impact ==
Movie audiences have discovered that a dip in the nude can be extremely refreshing. ... Bathing sequences in Isabel's first movie, The Thunder Among the Leaves, made the film an instantaneous box-office smash and Isabel a star. In pointed contrast to the Bardot school of scenery, it is interesting to note that there is virtually nothing childish about Isabel's charms.

— Playboy Magazine, April 1960

The film featured Isabel Sarli in her first starring role and made her a sex symbol. It also marked the beginning of her partnership with Armando Bó. The partnership spanned almost three decades and made numerous sexploitation films. Now considered a classic, the bath scene was the first one to feature full frontal nudity in Argentine cinema, and in all of Latin America. The News and Courier wrote "the opening in Buenos Aires was hailed as the start of a new era for Argentina's movie industry" after the end of Juan Perón's service as president and his propaganda techniques. Thunder Among the Leaves was the star vehicle for Sarli and made her and Bó internationally renowned. The nude scene, particularly, is said to have "[sparked] her star phenomena". The scandal caused by it attracted the international press and Sarli soon appeared in publications such as Time and Life. The film made her popular and at the premiere of her second film with Bó, Sabaleros (1959), a crowd of young fans mobbed her as she got to the cinema, ripped her dress and broke through a police cordon, which caused Sarli to faint twice. The Star-Banner reported "Buenos Aires moviegoers could not remember a more surprising and delirious reception for an Argentine movie actress."

== See also ==
- 1958 in film
- List of Argentine films of 1958
- Nudity in film
