= La herencia (1964 film) =

La Herencia
- Directed by: Ricardo Alventosa
- Written by: Ricardo Alventosa, Guy de Maupassant
- Edited by: Gerardo Rinaldi; Antonio Ripoll
- Release date: 10 December 1964
- Running time: 78 minutes
- Country: Argentina
- Language: Spanish

La Herencia is a 1964 Argentine film. The film was screened at the International Critics' Week of the 1964 Cannes Film Festival.

== Synopsis ==
A married couple must have a child in order to collect an inheritance, so when they realize they are unable to conceive, they consider replacing the man.

== Selected cast ==
- Juan Verdaguer
- Nathán Pinzón
- Ernesto Bianco
- Alberto Olmedo
- Silvio Soldán
- Marisa Grieben
