= Furia infernal =

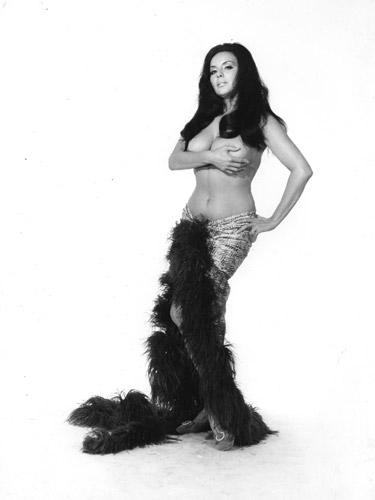
- Promotional still with Sarli
- Directed by: Armando Bó
- Written by: Armando Bó
- Starring: Isabel Sarli
- Release date: 1973
- Running time: 90 minute
- Country: Argentina
- Language: Spanish

Furia infernal, known in English-speaking territories as Ardent Summer, The Hot Days or, in the Carne Sobre Carne: Intimidades de Isabel Sarli documentary rendering, The Horny Days, is a 1973 Argentine drama film directed by Armando Bó and starring Isabel Sarli.

== Cast ==
- Isabel Sarli as Barbara Serrano
- Jorge Barreiro as Martin's Son
- Hugo Mújica as Martin's Son
- Víctor Bó as Juan / Martin's Younger Son
- Roberto Landers as Ruiz / Henchman
- Pancho Jiménez as Berto / Henchman
- Juan José Miguez as Martin Sottomayor / Land Owner
- Mario Casado as Indian Peon
- R. Casatti as Judge
