= Lujuria tropical =

- Directed by: Armando Bó
- Release date: 1962
- Running time: 95 minute
- Country: Argentina
- Language: Spanish

Lujuria tropical is a 1962 Argentine erotic film directed by Argentinian Filmmaker/Actor Armando Bó. It is considered a lost film.
