= Isabel Sarli =

Argentinian actress (1935–2019)

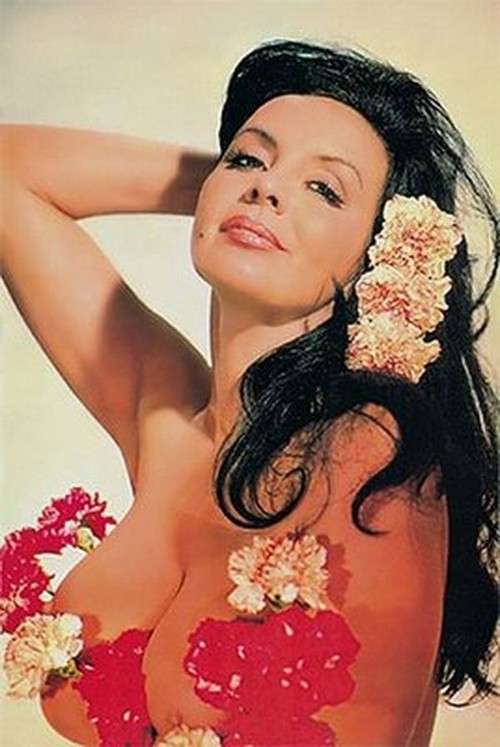
- Sarli in the late 1960s
- Born: Hilda Isabel Gorrindo Sarli; 9 July 1929; Concordia, Entre Ríos, Argentina
- Died: 25 June 2019 (aged 89); Buenos Aires, Argentina
- Occupations: Actress; model
- Years active: 1954–1980; 1996–2009
- Known for: Starring in several cult films directed by Armando Bó being a sexploitation film icon
- Notable work: Thunder Among the Leaves; The Female: Seventy Times Seven; Carne; Fuego; Fiebre
- Spouse: Ralph Heinlein (m. 1953; div. 1954)
- Partner: Armando Bó (1956–1981, his death)
- Children: 2

Hilda Isabel Gorrindo Sarli (Spanish: [isaˈβel ˈsaɾli]; 9 July 1929 – 25 June 2019), nicknamed Coca, was an Argentine actress. She was known for starring in several sexploitation films by Armando Bó, especially in the 1960s and 1970s. She began her career as a model, becoming Miss Argentina and reaching the semi-finals of Miss Universe 1955. She was discovered by Bó in 1956 and made her acting debut the following year with Thunder Among the Leaves, in which a controversial nude scene featuring Sarli made it the first film to feature full frontal nudity in Argentine cinema.

As the muse and protagonist of Bó's films, Sarli became the quintessential sex symbol of her country and a popular figure worldwide. After Bó's death in 1981, Sarli virtually retired from acting until the 1990s, when she appeared in a handful of film roles and TV cameos before her death in 2019. Since the year 2000 and onwards, her films have been revalued for their camp and kitsch content and are recognised as cult classics, while Sarli has established herself as a pop icon.

== Early life ==
Hilda Isabel Sarli Gorrindo Tito was born in Concordia, Entre Ríos Province, into a very poor family, as one of the daughters of Antonio Gorrindo and María Elena Sarli. Her father left the family when she was 3 years old. Those he had left behind, including Isabel and her mother, then moved to Buenos Aires. Her youngest sibling, and only brother, died at the age of five. Although, years later, her father tried to contact her, she refused angrily.

Sarli trained to become a secretary and, upon completing this training, started working for a publicity agency to support her mother. Then she was offered to work as a model, at which she proved to be so successful that she ended up resigning from her secretarial work. She won an award as the "most photographed model".

Contrary to what has sometimes been stated, she was nicknamed "Coca" by her mother.

== Career ==
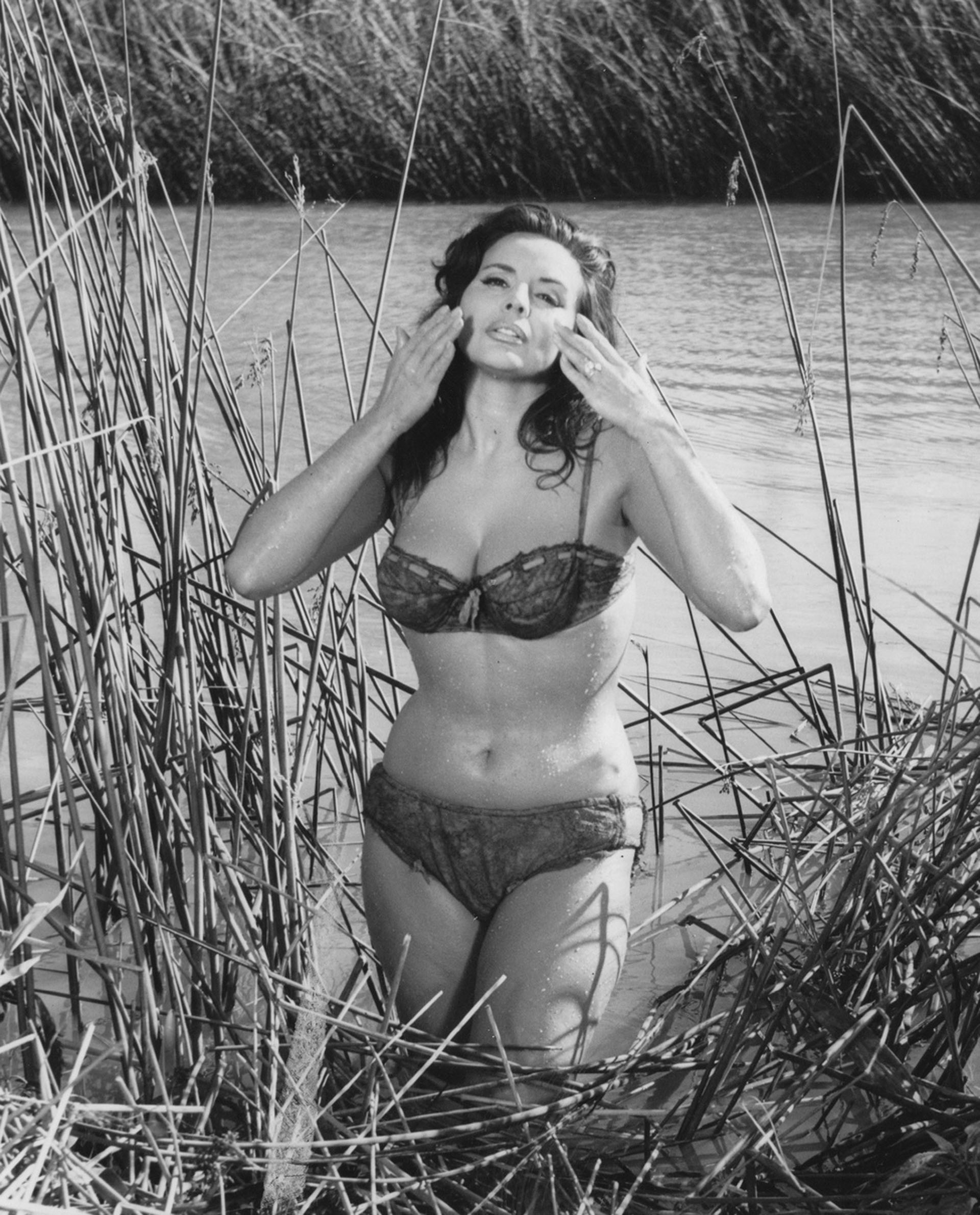
Sarli circa 1966

In 1955 she was chosen Miss Argentina and met the then Argentinian President, Juan Domingo Perón.

In June 1956, she met Armando Bó on a television show. He later offered her the opportunity to star in El trueno entre las hojas (Thunder in the Leaves). Bó convinced Sarli to be naked in a scene in which she bathed in a lake, though she had previously been told she would wear a flesh-colored body stocking. Bó likewise told Sarli they would shoot from afar and that the camera possessed no facility for magnification. The film became the first to feature full frontal nudity in Argentinian cinema. She went on to become an international Latin American star and made international headlines for the nude scene. She appeared in Time, Life, and Playboy magazines, the first Argentine actress to accomplish that feat. Bó and Sarli became lovers and she became the primary star of his films until his death in 1981. During this time, Sarli refused many offers to work with other directors, with the exception of Leopoldo Torre Nilsson on Setenta veces siete (The Female: Seventy Times Seven) and Dirk DeVilliers on The Virgin Goddess, her only English language film.

Bó's films were controversial at the time and most of them were banned, but this ban led them to be even more successful. Films like Fuego (1969) and Fiebre (1970) reached the American and European markets.

She received offers to work in the United States with Robert Aldrich, along with two offers extended to her from the United Kingdom, to appear in the Hammer Film production The Two Faces of Dr. Jekyll and the American co-production The Guns of Navarone, but she declined them; Sarli chose to work instead in Latin America, although always under Bó's direction: she made La Diosa Impura in México, Lujuria tropical in Venezuela, Desnuda en la arena in Panamá, La Burrerita de Ypacaraí in Paraguay and Favela and La Leona in Brazil.

Following Bó's death in 1981, Sarli retired from the cinema industry altogether but came back in the mid-'90s for Jorge Polaco's picaresque film, La Dama Regresa (1996). The film was inspired largely by her life and her public image, serving as an homage of sorts. In 2009 she teamed once more with Polaco in Arróz con Leche for a bit part.

In 2011, she starred in the movie Mis días con Gloria, where she played a character based on herself. The film was her first major role since La Dama Regresa in 1996. In a later radio interview, Sarli said the film did not do well at the box office because of the poor promotion it had received.

== Personal life ==
Before meeting Bó, Sarli was married to Ralph Heinlein and later divorced. Contrary to popular belief, Bó and Sarli never married. Sarli had two adopted children, Martin and Isabelita, who was her goddaughter. In June 2016, she and her daughter Isabelita were living in Martínez, Buenos Aires.

Sarli was very close to her mother, who refused to leave Argentina; this prevented her from accepting major offers such as Hollywood contracts and an invitation from Christian Dior.

== Recognition ==
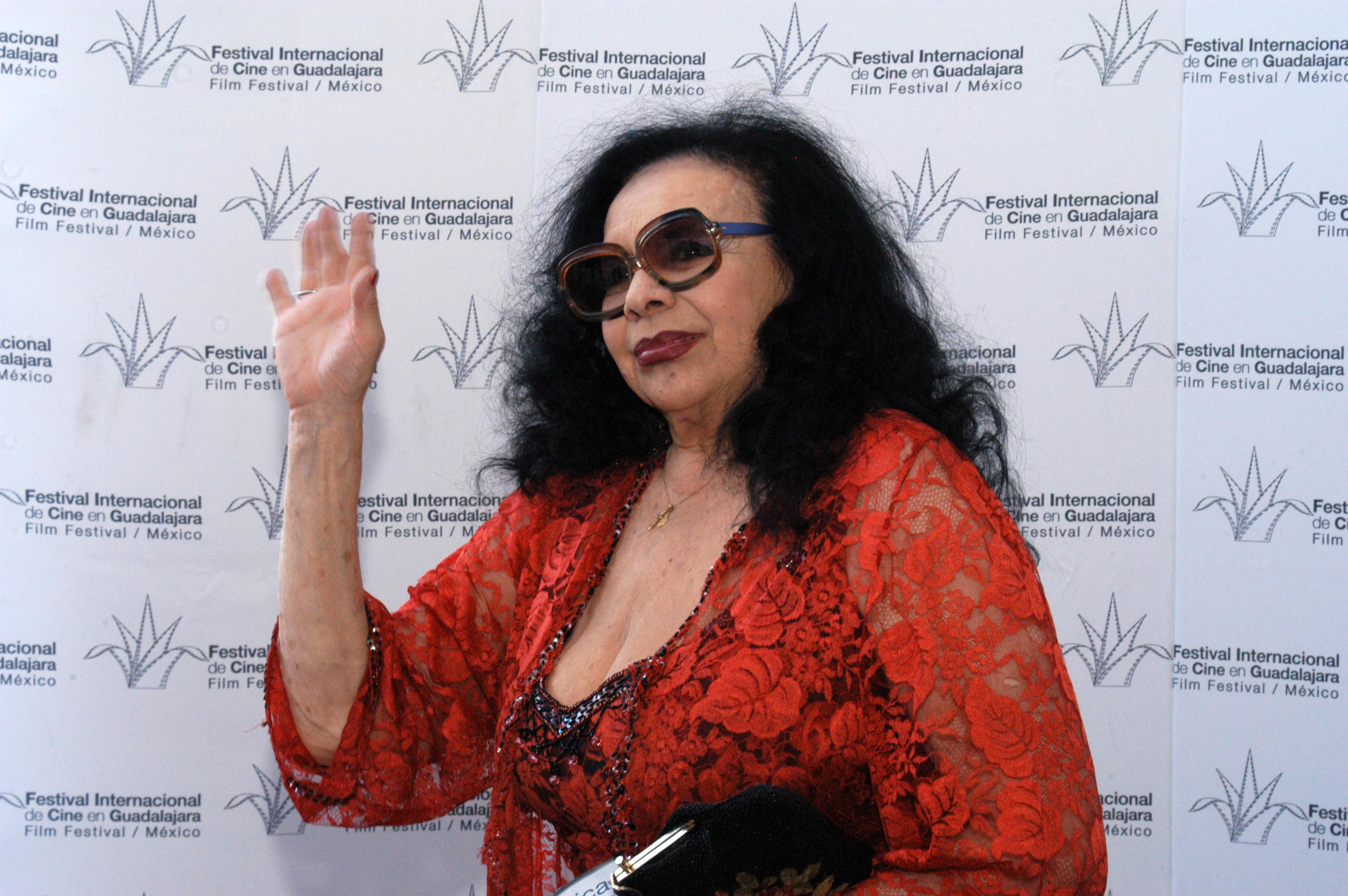
Sarli in the Guadalajara International Film Festival, 2008

In 2007, Argentinian film critic Diego Curubeto made the documentary Carne sobre carne – Intimidades de Isabel Sarli (Flesh on Flesh – Isabel Sarli's Personal Matters), with the collaboration of Isabel, Argentine actor Gastón Pauls and Spanish director Álex de la Iglesia. It is a well-received homage that includes deleted scenes from her films, censored material, rehearsals, anecdotes and interviews.

On 12 October 2012, it was reported that the Argentine President Cristina Fernández de Kirchner had named Sarli as Argentinian Ambassador of Popular Culture. The Boletín Oficial de la República Argentina, under Decree 1876/2012, stated:

"Isabel Sarli is considered a true representative of the national culture, as much for her acting skills in films as for being considered a popular icon of her day and an emblematic figure of Argentine cinema."

In 2010, the movie Fuego premiered at the Lincoln Center in New York, where it was shown with English subtitles. This showing was covered in Time Magazine by its then film critic Richard Corliss in his piece "Isabel Sarli: A Sex Bomb at Lincoln Center".

The popular expression "What do you want from me?", erroneously believed to have been spoken by Sarli in the movie Carne (1968), has become a catchphrase in Argentina. In fact, the line was originally used for the movie ...y el Demonio creó a los hombres.

Film director John Waters has stated several times that Sarli's movies have inspired some of his own films. In April 2018, Waters presented Fuego in Argentina and met Sarli.

== Filmography ==
Year	Title	Role
1958	El Trueno entre las hojas	Flavia Forkel
1959	Sabaleros	Angela
1960	India	Ansisé
1960	... y el Demonio creó a los hombres	
1961	Favela	
1962	La burrerita de Ypacaraí	
1962	Setenta veces siete	Cora / Laura
1964	La leona	
1964	La diosa impura	Laura
1964	Lujuria tropical	
1965	La mujer del zapatero	
1966	La tentación desnuda	Sandra Quesada
1966	Los días calientes	
1967	La señora del intendente	Flor Tetis
1968	Fuego	Laura
1968	Carne	Delicia
1968	La mujer de mi padre	Eva
1969	Éxtasis tropical	Monica
1969	Desnuda en la arena	Alicia
1969	Embrujada	Ansisé
1972	Fiebre	
1973	Furia infernal	Barbara
1974	Intimidades de una cualquiera	María
1974	El sexo y el amor	
1977	Una mariposa en la noche	Yvonne
1979	El último amor en Tierra del Fuego	
1979	Insaciable	
1980	Una viuda descocada	Flor Tetis Soutién de Gambetta
1996	La dama regresa	
2007	Carne sobre carne	Herself (archive material)
2009	Arróz con leche	Cameo
2010	Parapolicial negro, apuntes para una prehistoria de la AAA	Herself (interviewed)
2010	Mis días con Gloria	Gloria Saten
