= Armando Bó =

Argentine actor, director and screenwriter (1914–1981)

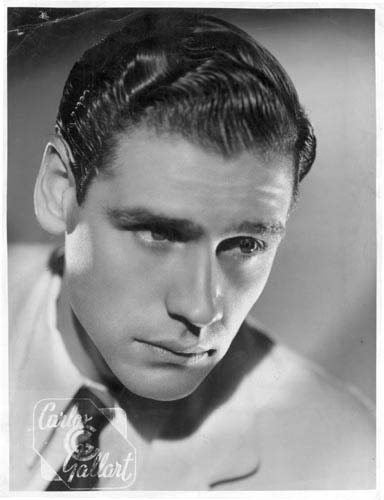
- Armando Bó in the 1940s, photographed by Annemarie Heinrich
- Born: 3 May 1914; Buenos Aires, Argentina
- Died: 8 October 1981 (aged 67); Buenos Aires, Argentina
- Years active: 1939–1979
- Spouse: Teresa Machinandiarena (m. 1956)
- Partner: Isabel Sarli (1956–1981, his death)
- Children: 3, including Víctor Bó
- Relatives: Armando Bó (grandson); Nicolás Giacobone (grandson)

Armando Bó (3 May 1914 – 8 October 1981) was an Argentine film actor, director, producer, screenwriter and score composer. He began his career as an actor and producer during the Golden Age of Argentine cinema of the 1930s and 1940s. In 1956, Bó met Isabel Sarli and cast her as the lead actress in his film Thunder Among the Leaves (1957), in which she made the first full frontal nude in the history of Argentine cinema. Bó and Sarli became both romantic and commercial partners, and the duo turned to the sexploitation genre in the 1960s and 1970s, these films being considered emblematic of the genre.

Bó's son is the actor/producer Víctor Bó and his grandson is the screenwriter and director Armando Bó.

== Biography ==
Bó began acting for film in 1939 in Ambición and made some 50 film appearances as an actor, but by the late 1940s he had already taken up an interest in film production and began as a director, producer, actor, and screenwriter in the early 1950s. He was involved in almost 100 different films during his career.

In June 1956, he met Isabel Sarli on a television show. He later offered her the opportunity to star in El trueno entre las hojas (Thunder in the Leaves). Bo tricked Sarli to appear naked in a scene in which she bathed in a lake, though she had previously been told she would wear a flesh-colored body stocking. The film became the first to feature full frontal nudity in Argentine cinema. Bo and Sarli became lovers and he continued to exploit her in his films, many, in which she was asked to perform sex acts on film always starring him as her lover. She became the primary star of his films until his death in 1981. Upon his death Sarli was given no rights to any of the films they made together.

Their films were controversial at the time and most of them were banned, but this ban led them to be even more successful. Films like Fuego (1969) and Fiebre (1970) reached the American and European markets. The banning of Fuego led to them moving into exile.

He was married to Teresa Machinandiarena, and had three children: María Inés, María Jesús, and Víctor. His son, Víctor Bó, was a prominent actor in Argentina during the 70s and 80s. His grandsons are Academy Award winners Nicolás Giacobone and Armando Bó Jr., credited as Armando Bó.

== Filmography ==
Year	Film	Role	Notes and Awards
1939	Ambition		
1939	Chimbela		
1939	...Y mañana serán hombres		
1940	Un señor mucamo		
1940	Nosotros, los muchachos		
1940	Fragata Sarmiento		
1941	Melodies of America		
1941	El más infeliz del pueblo		
1941	Mamá Gloria		
1941	La maestrita de los obreros		
1941	Si yo fuera rica		
1941	Joven, viuda y estanciera	Invitado	
1941	Cándida millonaria		
1942	Tú eres la paz		
1942	Story of a Poor Young Man		
1944	The Abyss Opens		
1945	Villa Rica del Espíritu Santo		
1945	The Circus Cavalcade		
1946	The Three Musketeers	D'Artagnan	
1947	La caraba		
1947	Si mis campos hablaran	Simon	
1948	Su última pelea		
1948	Pelota de trapo		
1949	Con el sudor de tu frente		
1950	Fangio, el demonio de las pistas		
1950	Sacachispas		
1951	My Divine Poverty		
1951	Honour Your Mother		
1951	En cuerpo y alma	Antonio Núñez	
1953	Muerte civil		
1953	El Hijo del crack	Héctor 'Balazo' López	
1955	Adiós, muchachos		
1956	El trueno entre las hojas		
1958	Sabaleros		
1959	...Y el demonio creó a los hombres		
1962	Lujuria tropical		
1962	La Burrerita de Ypacaraí		
1963	Pelota de cuero		
1963	La Diosa impura	Reinoso	
1964	La mujer del zapatero		
1964	La leona		
1966	La tentación desnuda		
1968	La mujer de mi padre	Jose	
1969	Éxtasis tropical		
1969	Fuego	Carlos	
1970	Fiebre	Juan	
1972	Intimidades de una cualquiera	Jose Luis	
1973	La diosa virgen		
1973	Furia infernal	Barbara's husband	
1974	El sexo y el amor		
1976	Insaciable		
1977	Una mariposa en la noche		
1979	El último amor en Tierra del Fuego		

== Legacy ==
Renowned filmmaker John Waters has claimed to be a big fan of Bó's filmography, and to have been influenced by it as well. Waters presented Bó's 1969 cult film Fuego as his annual selection within the 2002 Maryland Film Festival, and it was also a featured film in episode three of the Here! network original series John Waters Presents Movies That Will Corrupt You.
