= Silver Condor Award for Best Film =

Argentine film award

The Silver Condor Award for Best Film (Spanish: Premio Cóndor de Plata a la mejor película), given by the Argentine Film Critics Association, awards the best film in Argentina each year: There were no ceremonies held (or awards given) in 1958, from 1974 until 1980, and in 1983.

Year	Film	Director
2020	Los sonámbulos (2019)	Paula Hernández
2019	El Angel (2018)	Luis Ortega
2018	Zama (2017)	Lucrecia Martel
2017	La luz incidente (2016)	Ariel Rotter
2016	El patrón: radiografía de un crimen (2015)	Sebastián Schindel
2015	Refugiado (2014)	Diego Lerman
2014	Wakolda (2013)	Lucía Puenzo
2013	Infancia clandestina (2012)	Benjamín Ávila
2012	Las acacias (2011)	Pablo Gioreglli
2011	Carancho (2010)	Pablo Trapero
2010	El secreto de sus ojos (2009)	Juan José Campanella
2009	Aniceto (2008)	Leonardo Favio
2008	XXY (2007)	Lucía Puenzo
2007	Crónica de una fuga (2006)	Adrián Caetano
2006	El aura (2005)	Fabián Bielinsky
2005	Roma (2004)	Adolfo Aristarain
2004	Valentín (2002)	Alejandro Agresti
2003	Historias mínimas (2002)	Carlos Sorín
2002	El hijo de la novia (2001)	Juan José Campanella
2001	Nueve reinas (2000)	Fabián Bielinsky
2000	El mismo amor, la misma lluvia (1999)	Juan José Campanella
1999	Pizza, birra, faso (1998)	Bruno Stagnaro and Adrián Caetano
1998	Buenos Aires Vice Versa (1996)	Alejandro Agresti
1997	Sol de otoño (1996)	Eduardo Mignogna
1996	Casas de fuego (1995)	Juan Bautista Stagnaro
1995	Cortázar (1994)	Tristán Bauer
1994	Gatica, el mono (1993)	Leonardo Favio
1993	Un lugar en el mundo (1992)	Adolfo Aristarain
1992	Después de la tormenta (1991)	Tristán Bauer
1991	Últimas imágenes del naufragio (1989)	Eliseo Subiela
1990	La ciudad oculta (1989)	Osvaldo Andéchaga
1989	Verónico Cruz: La deuda interna (1988)	Miguel Pereira
1988	Hombre mirando al sudeste (1986)	Eliseo Subiela
1987	El exilio de Gardel (Tangos) (1986)	Fernando Solanas
1986	La historia oficial (1985)	Luis Puenzo
1985	Darse cuenta (1984)	Alejandro Doria
1983	Plata dulce (1982)	Fernando Ayala
1982	Tiempo de revancha (1981)	Adolfo Aristarain
1981	El infierno tan temido (1980)	Raúl de la Torre
1974	Juan Moreira (drama) (1973); Las Venganzas de Beto Sánchez (comedy) (1973)	Leonardo Favio; Héctor Olivera
1973	La maffia (1972)	Leopoldo Torre Nilsson
1972	Nosotros los monos (drama) (1971); La valija (comedy) (1971)	Edmund Valladares; Enrique Carreras
1971	Juan Lamaglia y señora (1970)	Raúl de la Torre
1970	Don Segundo Sombra (1969)	Manuel Antín
1969	Martín Fierro (1968)	Leopoldo Torre Nilsson
1968	El Romance del Aniceto y la Francisca (1967)	Leonardo Favio
1967	Del brazo y por la calle (1966)	Enrique Carreras
1966	Crónica de un niño solo (1965)	Leonardo Favio
1965	Los evadidos (1964)	Enrique Carreras
1964	Paula cautiva (1963)	Fernando Ayala
1963	Los Jóvenes viejos (1962)	Rodolfo Khun
1962	Alias Gardelito (1961)	Lautaro Murúa
1961	Shunko (1960)	Lautaro Murúa
1960	La caída (1959)	Leopoldo Torre Nilsson
1959	El jefe (1958)	Fernando Ayala
1957	Los tallos amargos (1956)	Fernando Ayala
1956	La Quintrala (1955)	Hugo del Carril
1955	Barrio gris (1954)	Mario Soffici
1954	Caballito criollo (1953)	Ralph Pappier
1953	Las aguas bajan turbias (1952)	Hugo del Carril
1952	Los isleros (1951)	Lucas Demare
1951	Escuela de campeones (1950)	Ralph Pappier
1950	Almafuerte (1949)	Luis César Amadori
1949	Dios se lo pague (1948)	Luis César Amadori
1948	Albéniz (1947)	Luis César Amadori
1947	Celos (1946)	Mario Soffici
1946	La dama duende (1945)	Luis Saslavsky
1945	Su mejor alumno (1944)	Lucas Demare
1944	Juvenilia (1943)	Augusto César Vatteone
1943	La guerra gaucha (1942)	Lucas Demare
