= List of Argentine films of 1975 =

A list of films produced in Argentina in 1975:

Argentine films of 1975
Title	Director	Release	Genre
A - F
El acomodador	Edgardo Rosso	1 December	
Bodas de cristal	Rodolfo Costamagna	3 April	
Carmiña (Su historia de amor)	Julio Saraceni	27 March	
Los chantas	José A. Martínez Suárez	3 April	
Los chiflados dan el golpe	Enrique Dawi	9 October	
Los Chiflados del batallón	Enrique Dawi	6 February	
Los Días que me diste	Fernando Siro	15 March	
Difunta Correa	Hugo Reynaldo Mattar	18 September	
Las Dos culpas de Bettina	Ignacio Tankel	22 May	
El familiar	Octavio Getino	9 October	
G - O
Los gauchos judíos	Juan José Jusid	22 May	
La guerra del cerdo	Leopoldo Torre Nilsson	7 August	
La Hora de María y el pájaro de oro	Rodolfo Kuhn	28 August	
Los irrompibles	Emilio Vieyra	17 July	
Más allá del sol	Hugo Fregonese	26 June	
Maridos en vacaciones	Enrique Cahen Salaberry	26 June	Comedy
Mi novia el...	Enrique Cahen Salaberry	13 March	Comedy
El muerto	Héctor Olivera	21 August	
Nazareno Cruz y el lobo	Leonardo Favio	5 June	
No hay que aflojarle a la vida	Enrique Carreras	24 July	
Los orilleros	23 October	Ricardo Luna	
P - Z
La film	José María Paolantonio	2 October	
Petete y Trapito	Manuel García Ferré	17 July	Animated
El pibe cabeza	Leopoldo Torre Nilsson	17 April	drama
Las Procesadas	Enrique Carreras	15 May	
La Raulito	Lautaro Murúa	10 July	
Rebeldía	Carlos Biaghetti	17 July	
Solamente ella	Lucas Demare	25 September	
Las sorpresas	Luis Puenzo, Carlos Galettini and Alberto Fischerman	4 September	
La super, super aventura	Enrique Carreras	27 February	
Triángulo de cuatro	Fernando Ayala	10 April	
Una mujer	Juan José Stagnaro	11 September	
Un mundo de amor	Mario Sábato	17 July	
Yo maté a Facundo	Hugo del Carril	29 May	

== External links and references ==
- Argentine films of 1975 at the Internet Movie Database
