= Nora Cullen =

Argentine actress (1905–1990)

- Born: 1905
- Died: 1990 (aged 84–85)
- Occupation: Actress

Nora Cullen (1905–1990) was an Argentine actress. Cullen starred in several films with director Leonardo Favio, including El dependiente (1969), Nazareno Cruz y el Lobo (1975) and Soñar, soñar (1976). For her performance opposite Walter Vidarte and Graciela Borges in El dependiente, the Argentine Film Critics Association awarded her the Silver Condor Award for Best Supporting Actress in 1970. Cullen also worked in TV and radio and on television she was known for her role in La pasión de Florencio Sánchez opposite Alfredo Alcón. In radio theatre she worked on Radio Splendid. Guillermo Battaglia, who also featured with her, became her husband.

== Filmography ==
- Los bañeros más locos del mundo (1987) Dir. Carlos Galettini.
- Pubis angelical (1982) Dir. Raúl de la Torre.
- Plata dulce (1982) Dir. Fernando Ayala.
- Los crápulas (1981) Dir. Jorge Pantano.
- Los viernes de la eternidad (1981) Dir. Héctor Olivera.
- El infierno tan temido (1980) Dir. Raúl de la Torre.
- Brigada en acción (1977) Dir. Palito Ortega.
- Soñar, soñar (1976) Dir. Leonardo Favio.
- La casa de las sombras (1976) Dir. Ricardo Wullicher.
- La película (1975) Dir. José María Paolantonio.
- Solamente ella (1975) Dir. Lucas Demare.
- Nazareno Cruz y el Lobo (1975) Dir. Leonardo Favio.
- Las venganzas de Beto Sánchez (1973) Dir. Héctor Olivera.
- Con alma y vida (1970) Dir. David José Kohon.
- Fuiste mía un verano (1969) Dir. Eduardo Calcagno.
- El dependiente (1969) Dir. Leonardo Favio.
- Turismo de carretera (1968) Dir. Rodolfo Kuhn.
- Los tímidos visten de gris (inédita - 1965) Dir. Jorge Darnell.
- Pesadilla (1963) Dir. Diego Santillán.
