= El dependiente =

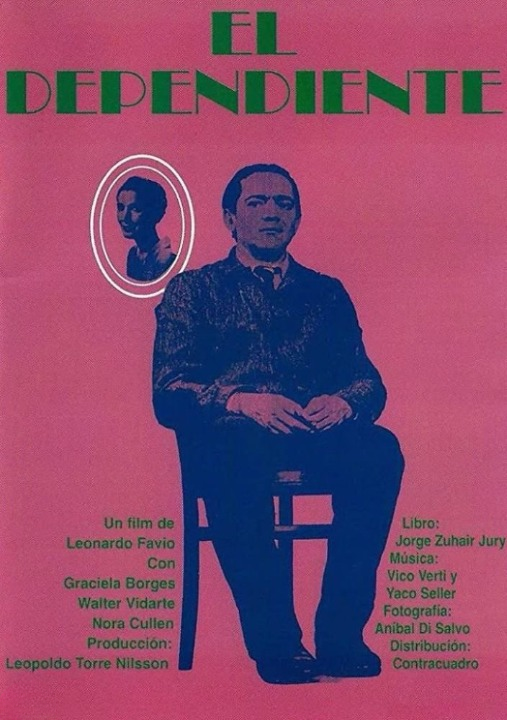
- Theatrical release poster
- Directed by: Leonardo Favio
- Screenplay by: Jorge Zuhair Jury; Leonardo Favio
- Based on: "El dependiente" by Jorge Zuhair Jury
- Produced by: Leopoldo Torre Nilsson
- Starring: Graciela Borges; Walter Vidarte; Fernando Iglesias; Nora Cullen
- Cinematography: Aníbal Di Salvo
- Edited by: Antonio Ripoll
- Music by: Vico Berti
- Production company: Contracuadro
- Release date: 1969
- Running time: 87 minutes
- Country: Argentina
- Language: Spanish

El dependiente (Spanish for "the shop assistant" but also "the dependent") is a 1969 Argentine drama film directed by Leonardo Favio and starring Graciela Borges, Walter Vidarte, Fernando Iglesias and Nora Cullen. It is based on the short story of the same name by Jorge Zuhair Jury, Favio's brother and frequent collaborator, with whom he also co-wrote the screenplay alongside Roberto Irigoyen. Set in a small provincial town, the film tells the story of Mr. Fernández, a lonely shop assistant in a hardware store that falls in love with Miss Plasini, a mysterious and isolated woman who lives with her mother. It is the last installment of an unofficial trilogy of films Favio made in the 1960s, after Crónica de un niño solo (1965) and El romance del Aniceto y la Francisca (1967), which have earned him recognition as one of the most important auteurs of Argentine cinema, despite not being so well known outside the country. The film was produced by Leopoldo Torre Nilsson through his company Contracuadro, and was shot in the spring of 1968 in the then small town of Derqui, in the Pilar district of the province of Buenos Aires.

Upon completion, El dependiente was screened in the main competition of the 1968 San Sebastián Film Festival, where it received the Cine Nuevo (English: New Cinema) award and an honorable mention from the Federation of Cine Clubs of Spain, and the Cartagena Film Festival, where it received the award for best film. The film had its commercial release on 1 January 1969 at the Paramount and Libertador theaters in Buenos Aires. Like Favio's previous films, El dependiente was well-received by critics but a box-office failure, which prompted the director to reinvent himself as a successful popular singer. At the 1970 Argentine Film Critics Awards, Vidarte received the Silver Condor Award for Best Actor and Cullen the Silver Condor Award for Best Supporting Actress.

In 2000, it was selected as the 14th greatest Argentine film of all time in a poll conducted by the Museo del Cine Pablo Ducrós Hicken. In a new version of the survey organized in 2022 by the specialized magazines La vida util, Taipei and La tierra quema, presented at the Mar del Plata International Film Festival, the film reached the 4th position. In 2022, a print of the film was declared of National Artistic Interest by the Argentine government, along with other Favio films that were part of the holdings of a company that went bankrupt that passed to the protection of the National Commission for Monuments, Places and Historical Property.

== Release and reception ==
Upon release, El dependiente was generally well-received by Argentine film critics. The reviewer for specialized film magazine Heraldo del Cinematografista highlighted the film's "stimulating critical vision of moral vulgarity and small-town lack of perspective." Gente magazine described it as a "rare cinema (...), magical realism of a naive world with a brutally simple anecdote, but with an incredible audacity in the treatment of editing and direction of the actors." For its part, the review of newspaper La Prensa noted: "In this strange and fascinating film (...) Favio defines with much greater clarity than in his previous works the essential springs of his art (...) he manages to impose his poetic world with remarkable balance and ease (...) The film impresses above all by a certain poetics of immobility, the description of a strangely suspended and frozen way of life in which madness, the grotesque and the sinister burst into the scene." In a less favorable review, Boom magazine stated that: "the characters are too far from reality, the lines too thick, too exaggerated, and grotesque to feel them as real." In addition, the review of Panorama magazine described the film as a simple imitation of Spanish "truculent" cinema, in the manner of Marco Ferreri's El cochecito (1960).

Despite the favorable critical reception, El dependiente was a box-office failure, as had happened with Favio's previous films. This can be partly explained by the decision of the Instituto Nacional de Cinematografía—established in 1957 after the civic-military dictatorship that overthrew President Juan Perón—to classify El dependiente as "category B" instead of "category A", a common practice by the agency to obstruct support for independent filmmakers in the 1960s.
