= Hernán Piquín =

Argentine dancer and actor

- Born: Hernán Javier Piquín; November 13, 1973 (age 52); Los Polvorines; Partido de Malvinas Argentinas; Buenos Aires; Argentina
- Known for: Dancing for a dream in Showmatch and videoclip of Abel Pintos - Tanto amor
- Partners: Agustín Barajas (2018-present); Mariela Anchipi (1994-1995)

Hernán Javier Piquín (Los Polvorines, November 13 from 1973) is an Argentine dancer and choreographer. He was born in the city of Los Polvorines, in the northwest of Greater Buenos Aires, 33 km from the center of the Federal Capital. He attended the Higher Institute of Art of the Teatro Colón.

== Biography ==
In 1985 he was invited as an honor student by the School of the English National Ballet (in London), where he was named "solo dancer" and as "principal dancer" at Le Jeune Ballet de France (in Paris).

In 1992 he joined the Teatro Colón's Stable Ballet. Since 1994 he has worked as principal dancer in the Argentine Ballet of Julio Bocca, with which he toured Europe, Asia, Africa and the entire American continent.

In 1998 he joined the Smuin Ballets/SF (San Francisco Ballet), with whom he performed Medea, Q to V and Homeless.

In 2002 he replaced Julio Bocca in the main role of the show Boccatango which was presented at the International Transplant Congress, at the Jackie Glackson Theater (in Miami).

In 2003, Andrea Candela (Julio Bocca's assistant) created the play September, especially for Hernán Piquin and Cecilia Figaredo, which they premiered that same year at the Teatro Ópera in Buenos Aires.

In October 2004 he starred in Orfeo (by José Limón) at the Teatro Ópera in the city of Buenos Aires.

He premiered "Tango", "Coven" and "Ketiak" at the Borges Cultural Center, with choreographies by Ana María Stekelman and Oscar Aráiz.

In 2005 he participated in the «Eighty Years Gala» of the Stable Ballet of the Teatro Colón. the AlternativaTeatral.com website.

In 2006 he premiered Hernán Buenosayres, angel and demon .

In 2007 he worked as principal dancer for the Teatro Colón Ballet.

In 2008 he starred in the film Aniceto, by Leonardo Favio.

In 2009 he participated in the soap opera Herencia de amor (by Telefé).

In 2010 he coached the media character Fabio La Mole Moli, in the television contest Dancing for a Dream, by Marcelo Tinelli.

In 2011 he participated in this same contest (along with Noelia Pompa) and won it. For this he was criticized by several Argentine dancers.

He participated in the second consecutive year in Dancing for a dream, since as the winner of 2011 he had the opportunity to return to Dancing for a drem 2012 and became champion of the contest, thus becoming the first two-time champion in the history of this dance contest.

In 2014, for the third time in a row, he reached the final of Dancing for a Dream (this time with Cecilia Figaredo), he became runner-up losing against the couple made up of the comedians Anita Martínez and Bicho Gómez.

In 2016, he presents his new show Let It Be a love story.

In 2017, he tours with: "Let It Be, a love story".

In 2019, he will participate for the third consecutive year with Macarena Rinaldi in Dancing for a dream.

In 2021 he was launched as a councilor of avanza libertad, in the Pilar Party, together with Juan Martin Tito.

== Ballets and theater plays ==
| Year | Production | Organization | Direction | Choreography | Character | Country |
|---|---|---|---|---|---|---|
| 1985 | English National Ballet | | | | | England |
| 1985 | Le Jeune Ballet | | | | Various roles | France |
| 1986 | Caracas Youth Ballet | | | | Various roles | Venezuela |
| 1992- 1994 | Stable Ballet of the Teatro Colón. | | | | Various roles | Argentina |
| 1998 | Swan Lake | Argentine Ballet | Julio Bocca | Jean-Pierre Aviotte | Main Role | Argentina |
| 2000 | Medea | Smuin Ballets of San Francisco | | | Main Role | United States |
| 2000 | QaV | Smuin Ballets of San Francisco | | | Main Role | United States |
| 2001 | Homeless | Smuin Ballets of San Francisco | | | Main Role | United States |
| 2002 | Boccatango | Argentine Ballet | Julio Bocca | | Main Role | Argentina |
| 2003 | Night Chase | Lino Patalano | Julio Bocca | Chet Walker | Main Role | Argentina |
| 2003 | September | Argentine Ballet | Julio Bocca | Andrea Candela | Main Role | Argentina |
| 2004 | The man with the red tie | Argentine Ballet | Julio Bocca | Ana Stekelman | Soloist Role | Argentina |
| 2005 | Nine Sinatra Songs | Argentine Ballet | Julio Bocca | Ana Stekelman | Main Role | Argentina |
| 2004 | Orpheus | | | Jose Limon | Main Role | Argentina |
| 2005 | Tango | Argentine Ballet | Julio Bocca | Ana Stekelman - Oscar Aráiz | Main Role | Argentina |
| 2005 | Aquellarre | Argentine Ballet | Julio Bocca | Ana Stekelman - Oscar Aráiz | Main Role | Argentina |
| 2005 | Ketiak | Argentine Ballet | Julio Bocca | Ana Stekelman - Oscar Aráiz | Main Role | Argentina |
| 2005 | Desiderata | Argentine Ballet | Julio Bocca | Andrea Candela | Main Role | Argentina |
| 2005 | Tango Brujo | Argentine Ballet | Julio Bocca | Ana Stekelman | Main Role | Argentina |
| 2005 | The River, by Alvin Ailey | Argentine Ballet | Julio Bocca | Ana Stekelman | Main Role | Argentina |
| 2005 | Gala of the 80 years of the Ballet | Teatro Colón | | | Special Role | Argentina |
| 2006 | Hernán BuenosAyres | | Laura Roatta | Margarita Fernandez | Main Role | Argentina |
| 2007 | Bayadera | Colón Theater | | | Main Role | Argentina |
| 2007 | Boléro | Teatro Colón | | | Main Role | Argentina |
| 2008 | Marathon | Maipo Group | | | Main Role | Argentina |
| 2009 | The party is at the Tabarís | Gerardo Sofovich | Gerardo Sofovich | | Main Role | Argentina |
| 2010 | The Great Burlesque | Maxi Oliva - M. Gallardo | Flavio Mendoza | Flavio Mendoza | Main Role | Argentina |
| 2010 | Nazareno Cruz and the wolf | Mariana Gonzales Pozzi | N. González Pozzi | | Special Role | Argentina |
| 2010 - 2011 | Tango Passion | Veronica Scally | Laura Roatta | Sol Viviano - Osmar Odone | Main Role | Argentina |
| 2010 | Captive loves | | Laura Roatta | M. Fernández - Laura Roatta | Main Role | Argentina |
| 2011 - 2013 | Freddie | GRG Range | Ricardo Auraz | Margarita Fernandez- Laura Roatta | Main Role | Argentina |
| 2014 | Signum | Berenstein, Gallardo and Camaño | Sean Mac Mckeown | Andrea Candela | Main Role | Argentina |
| 2014 | Ballad for my Death | Marcelo Gallardo | | Sol Viviano - Osmar Odone | Main Role | Argentina |
| 2014 - 2015 | Pasional | Marcelo Gallardo | | Sol Viviano - Osmar Odone | Main Role | Argentina |
| 2016 - 2017 | Let it be - A Love Story | Marcelo Gallardo | | Georgina Tirotta | Main Role | Argentina |
| 2017 - 2018 | Between Boleros and Tangos | JUST ART | Hernán Piquín, Osmar Odone and Sol Viviano | | Main Role | Argentina |
| 2018 | Dionisio | Dance Company - Rafael Amargo Theater | Pablo Mori | Rafael Amargo and Ramón Oller | Apollo | Spain |
| 2019 | Fire and Passion between Boleros Tango and Flamenco | JUST ART | Hernán Piquín, Osmar Odone and Sol Viviano | | Main Role | Argentina |

- Carmen
- Le corsaire
- Giselle
- Serenade
- Apollo
- Mixture, Dance in the Park (dancer).
- Stars in dance (dancer).

== Filmography ==
| Year | Film | Production | Address | Character | Notes | Country |
|---|---|---|---|---|---|---|
| 2008 | Aniceto | Juan Martín Treffinger | Leonardo Favio | El aniceto | Protagonist | Argentina |
| 2018 | The scourge of the devil | | | | Protagonist | Argentina |

== Television ==
| Year | Program | Character | Grades | Channel | Country |
|---|---|---|---|---|---|
| 2008 | ShowMatch - Dancing for a dream 2008 / Reality | Himself | Opening Jazz - Special Participation | eltrece | Argentina |
| 2009 | ShowMatch - Dancing for a dream Kids / Reality | Himself | Opening - Special Participation | eltrece | Argentina |
| 2009 | Heritage of Love - Telenovela | Eugenio | Special Participation | Telefe | Argentina |
| 2010 | ShowMatch - Dancing for a dream 2010 / Reality | Himself | Apenue aquadance - Special Participation | eltrece | Argentina |
| 2011 | ShowMatch - Dancing for a dream 2011 / Reality | Himself | Participant (winner) | eltrece | Argentina |
| 2012 | ShowMatch - Dancing for a dream 2012 / Reality | Himself | Participant (winner) | eltrece | Argentina |
| 2014 | ShowMatch - Dancing for a dream 2014 / Reality | Himself | Participant (runner-up) | eltrece | Argentina |
| 2017 | ShowMatch - Dancing for a dream 2017 / Reality | Himself | Participant (semifinalist) | eltrece | Argentina |
| 2018 | ShowMatch - Dancing for a dream 2018 / Reality | Himself | Invited participant | eltrece | Argentina |
| 2019 | ShowMatch - Dancing for a dream 2019 / Reality | Himself | Participant (abandon at 7 ° Gala) | eltrece | Argentina |
| 2021 | Showmatch - The Academy / Reality | Himself | Judge | eltrece | Argentina |

== Other jobs ==
| Year | Means, medium | Program | Role | Country |
|---|---|---|---|---|
| 2014 | Video clip | Abel Pintos - Tanto amor | Special Participation | Argentina |

== Awards and nominations ==
| Year | Prize | Category | Nominated work | Result |
|---|---|---|---|---|
| 2000 | Trumpet Shows | Dancer of the Year | Colon Theater | Won |
| 2001 | San Francisco Chronicle Awards | "Dancer of the Year" | San Francisco Ballet | Won |
| 2005 | Maria Ruanova Awards - granted by the Argentine Dance Council | Trajectory | | Won |
| 2005 | Trumpet Shows | dance figure | Colon Theater Ballet | Won |
| 2008 | Trumpet Shows | Breakout Actor | Aniceto | Won |
| 2008 | Silver Condor | Breakout Actor | Aniceto | Won |
| 2008 | South Award | Revelation Film Actor | Aniceto | Won |
| 2012 | Starfish Awards | Best Dance Show | Freddie | Won |
