= La Película =

1975 film

- Directed by: José María Paolantonio
- Written by: Ernesto Frers; José María Paolantonio
- Produced by: Sabina Sigler
- Starring: Ernesto Bianco; Alejandra Boero; Nora Cullen; Ricardo Espalter; Cacho Espíndola; Diana Maggi; Héctor Pellegrini; Horacio Roca; Marilina Ross; Hugo Soto; Osvaldo Terranova; María Valenzuela
- Cinematography: Miguel Rodríguez
- Edited by: Antonio Ripoll
- Music by: Gustavo Beytelman
- Release date: 1975
- Running time: 95 min.
- Country: Argentina
- Language: Spanish

La Película is a 1975 Argentine film. It won the "Opera Prima" prize at the San Sebastian International Festival in 1976.

== Plot summary ==
The film features movies within movies. At one level is the filming of a silent western entitled "El Corazon del gaucho" (lit. "the Cowboys's Heart"). The western's plot focuses on the kidnapping of a bride-to-be (Diana Maggi) and her rescue by the groom played by Ernesto Bianco. Another level of the film is about the reaction of the residents of San Benito to the arrival of the actors. The third thread of the movie follows a young film-buff named Truffini, a reference to François Truffaut. Truffini documents the making of the movie and its intersection with local life.

== Cast ==
- Ernesto Bianco
- Alejandra Boero
- Nora Cullen
- Ricardo Espalter
- Cacho Espíndola
- Diana Maggi
- Héctor Pellegrini
- Horacio Roca
- Marilina Ross
- Hugo Soto
- Osvaldo Terranova
- María Valenzuela
