= Elsa Daniel =

Argentine actress

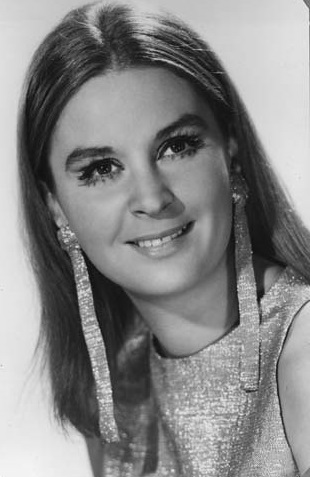
- Born: Elsa Nilda Gómez Scapatti; 13 November 1936; San Lorenzo, Santa Fe Province, Argentina
- Died: 25 June 2017 (aged 80); Buenos Aires, Argentina
- Years active: 1950–1987

Elsa Daniel born Elsa Nilda Gómez Scapatti (13 November 1936 – 25 June 2017) was an Argentine film actress. She started in movies in the 1954 classic The Grandfather and made some 30 appearances in film between then and 1987.

Daniel, a blonde, played ingenues in many of Leopoldo Torre Nilsson's masterpieces such as La Casa del ángel, La Caída, and La Mano en la trampa. She was shortly married to director Rodolfo Khun, who directed her in the film Los Inconstantes. She retired from cinema in 1987.

== Death ==
Elsa Daniel died on 25 June 2017, aged 80.

== Filmography ==
| Year | Title | Role | Notes |
|---|---|---|---|
| 1954 | The Grandfather | Dorotea | |
| 1955 | Vida nocturna | Nelly | |
| 1955 | El Juramento de Lagardere | | |
| 1956 | Graciela | Graciela Aliaga | |
| 1957 | La Casa del ángel | Ana Castro | |
| 1958 | Isla brava | | |
| 1958 | Un centavo de mujer | | |
| 1959 | La Caída | Albertina | |
| 1960 | Las furias | Hija | |
| 1960 | Luna Park | | |
| 1961 | La Mano en la trampa | Laura Lavigne | |
| 1962 | La Novia | | |
| 1962 | Los inconstantes | | |
| 1963 | The Dragonfly Is Not an Insect | The Bride | |
| 1964 | Il vuoto | Barbara Nielsen | |
| 1965 | Viaje de una noche de verano | | |
| 1965 | Cosquín, amor y folklore | | |
| 1967 | El Romance del Aniceto y la Francisca | Francisca | |
| 1968 | Psexoanálisis | | |
| 1968 | Ufa con el sexo | Evangelina | |
| 1968 | Amor y un poco más | | |
| 1970 | Amalio Reyes, un hombre | | |
| 1974 | La balada del regreso | Tomasa | |
| 1975 | Los chantas | Patricia aka Ana | |
| 1978 | Broken Comedy | | |
| 1980 | Comandos azules | | |
| 1982 | Buenos Aires tango | | |
