= The Hand in the Trap =

- Theatrical release poster
- Directed by: Leopoldo Torre Nilsson
- Written by: Beatriz Guido; Leopoldo Torre Nilsson; Ricardo Muñoz Suay; Ricardo Luna
- Story by: Beatriz Guido
- Produced by: Leopoldo Torre Nilsson
- Starring: Francisco Rabal; Elsa Daniel; Leonardo Favio
- Cinematography: Juan Julio Baena
- Edited by: Jacinto Cascales; Pablo G. del Amo; Jorge Gárate
- Release date: 8 June 1961
- Running time: 91 minutes
- Country: Argentina
- Language: Spanish

The Hand in the Trap (Spanish: La mano en la trampa) is a 1961 Argentine film directed by Leopoldo Torre Nilsson and starring Francisco Rabal, Elsa Daniel and Leonardo Favio. It was entered into the 1961 Cannes Film Festival, where it won the FIPRESCI Prize.

In a survey of the 100 greatest films of Argentine cinema carried out by the Museo del Cine Pablo Ducrós Hicken in 2000, the film reached the 17th position. In a new version of the survey organized in 2022 by the specialized magazines La vida útil, Taipei and La tierra quema, presented at the Mar del Plata International Film Festival, the film reached the 47th position.

== Plot ==
Laura is back home for the holidays after spending the entire year as a boarder at a convent school. Waiting for her are her mother and aunt, both professional embroiderers, living in a large, dark mansion. The prospect of a summer filled with boredom and loneliness looms, but this time, Laura, having matured, starts questioning the family secrets.

She's aware that there's a mysterious "guest" confined to the second floor of the house, whom she's forbidden to see. With the help of her suitor, Miguel, Laura attempts to catch a glimpse of this creature. However, merely seeing it won't unravel the mysteries. She must also uncover secrets involving an unknown aunt in the United States, her ex-partner, and the correspondence between her and her mother.

This journey leads her to rediscover old passions and confront past embarrassments, ultimately revealing the horror hidden within her own home.

== Cast ==
- Elsa Daniel - Laura Lavigne
- Francisco Rabal - Cristóbal Achával
- Leonardo Favio - Miguel
- María Rosa Gallo - Inés Lavigne
- Berta Ortegosa - Laura's Mother
- Hilda Suárez - Lisa Lavigne
- Enrique Vilches - Postman
