= List of number-one hits of 1969 (Argentina) =

This is a list of the songs that reached number one in Argentina in 1969, according to Billboard magazine with data provided by Rubén Machado's "Escalera a la fama".

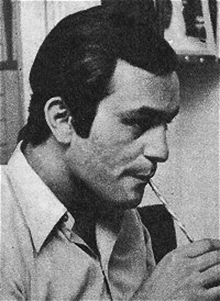
Singer and filmmaker Leonardo Favio (pictured) replaced himself twice at the No. 1 position in the Argentine charts.

Issue date	Song	Artist
January 11	"Fuiste mía un verano"	Leonardo Favio
January 18	"Ella...ella ya me olvidó, yo la recuerdo ahora"	Leonardo Favio
January 25	"Ella...ella ya me olvidó, yo la recuerdo ahora"	Leonardo Favio
February 1	"Ella...ella ya me olvidó, yo la recuerdo ahora"	Leonardo Favio
February 8	"Ella...ella ya me olvidó, yo la recuerdo ahora"	Leonardo Favio
February 15	"Ella...ella ya me olvidó, yo la recuerdo ahora"	Leonardo Favio
February 22	"Ella...ella ya me olvidó, yo la recuerdo ahora"	Leonardo Favio
March 8	"Ella...ella ya me olvidó, yo la recuerdo ahora"	Leonardo Favio
March 15	"Ella...ella ya me olvidó, yo la recuerdo ahora"	Leonardo Favio
March 22	"Ella...ella ya me olvidó, yo la recuerdo ahora"	Leonardo Favio
March 29	"Ella...ella ya me olvidó, yo la recuerdo ahora"	Leonardo Favio
April 5	"Ella...ella ya me olvidó, yo la recuerdo ahora"	Leonardo Favio
April 12	"Ella...ella ya me olvidó, yo la recuerdo ahora"	Leonardo Favio
April 19	"Ella...ella ya me olvidó, yo la recuerdo ahora"	Leonardo Favio
April 26	"Ella...ella ya me olvidó, yo la recuerdo ahora"	Leonardo Favio
May 3	"Ding dong, ding dong, estas cosas del amor"	Leonardo Favio
May 17	"Ding dong, ding dong, estas cosas del amor"	Leonardo Favio
May 24	"El extraño del pelo largo"	La Joven Guardia
June 14	"El extraño del pelo largo"	La Joven Guardia
June 21	"Rosa, rosa"	Sandro
August 2	"Tiritando"	Donald
August 9	"Tiritando"	Donald
August 16	"Tiritando"	Donald
August 23	"Tiritando"	Donald
August 30	"Tiritando"	Donald
September 6	"Tiritando"	Donald
September 13	"Tiritando"	Donald
October 25	"La extraña de las botas rosas"	La Joven Guardia
November 1	"La extraña de las botas rosas"	La Joven Guardia
November 8	"La extraña de las botas rosas"	La Joven Guardia
November 15	"Yo en mi casa y ella en el bar"	Los Náufragos
November 22	"Yo en mi casa y ella en el bar"	Los Náufragos
November 29	"Yo en mi casa y ella en el bar"	Los Náufragos
December 6	"Yo en mi casa y ella en el bar"	Los Náufragos

== See also ==
- 1969 in music
