= Shaila =

Shaila may refer to:

- Shaila (band), an Argentine band
- Shaila (album), a 2004 album by Shaila Dúrcal
- Shaila (film), an upcoming Indian Hindi-language film
