= Nazareno Cruz and the Wolf =

1975 film

Nazareno Cruz y el lobo
- Theatrical release poster
- Directed by: Leonardo Favio
- Screenplay by: Leonardo Favio; Jorge Zuhair Jury
- Based on: Nazareno Cruz y el lobo (radio program) by Juan Carlos Chiappe
- Produced by: Leonardo Favio; Orlando De Benedetti
- Starring: Juan José Camero; Marina Magalí; Alfredo Alcón; Lautaro Murúa
- Cinematography: Juan José Stagnaro
- Edited by: Cristián Kaulen; Antonio Ripoll
- Music by: Juan José García Caffi and Jorge Candia
- Production company: Choila Producciones Cinematográficas
- Distributed by: Producciones del Plata S.A.
- Release date: 1975
- Running time: 92 minutes
- Countries: Argentina; Mexico
- Languages: Spanish; Quechua

Nazareno Cruz and the Wolf (Spanish: Nazareno Cruz y el lobo, las palomas y los gritos; original title translatable as "Nazareno Cruz and the Wolf: The Doves and the Screams") is a 1975 fantasy drama film coproduced and directed by Leonardo Favio and starring Juan José Camero, Marina Magali and Alfredo Alcón. It was written by Favio and Jorge Zuhair Jury, Favio's brother and frequent script collaborator. The story works as an adaptation of the classical myth of the Lobizón, and it has become a classic film. It is also widely known as the most successful of all time in its country. With 3.4 million viewers it holds the national record ahead of El secreto de sus ojos. The film is a co-production between Argentina and Mexico.

It was selected as the Argentine entry for the Best Foreign Language Film at the 48th Academy Awards, but was not accepted as a nominee. It was also entered in the 9th Moscow International Film Festival.

In a survey of the 100 greatest films of Argentine cinema carried out by the Museo del Cine Pablo Ducrós Hicken in 2000, the film reached the 30th position. In a new version of the survey organized in 2022 by the specialized magazines La vida útil, Taipei and La tierra quema, presented at the Mar del Plata International Film Festival, the film reached the 17th position. Also in 2022, the film was included in Spanish magazine Fotogramas's list of the 20 best Argentine films of all time.

== Synopsis ==
Nazareno Cruz is a young farmer living in a rural town. He is known for being the seventh son of his father, and so he is seen by the locals as the victim of the werewolf curse. Despite this, he lives happily in the community. When Nazareno is about to turn 18, he meets Griselda and they both fall in love. Soon after, "Mandinga" (the Devil) presents himself to Nazareno and explains that his curse is real. Mandinga makes Nazareno a proposition: if Nazareno gives up his love, he will receive in exchange his freedom and many riches. Nazareno refuses the deal and eventually turns into a werewolf, becoming involved in a series of tragedies.

== Cast ==
- Juan José Camero ... Nazareno Cruz
- Marina Magali ... Griselda
- Alfredo Alcón ... The Powerful/Mandinga
- Lautaro Murúa ... Julián
- Nora Cullen ... The Lechiguana
- Elcira Olivera Garcés ... Damiana
- Saul Jarlip ... The Old Man Pancho
- Juanita Lara ... Fidelia
- Yolanda Mayorani ... The Powerful's Godmother
- Marcelo Marcote ... The Child
- Josefina Faustín
- Augusto Kretschmar

== See also ==
- List of submissions to the 48th Academy Awards for Best Foreign Language Film
- List of Argentine submissions for the Academy Award for Best Foreign Language Film
