= El Juramento de Lagardere =

- Film poster
- Directed by: León Klimovsky
- Written by: Emilio Villalba Welsh (screenwriter), Paul Féval (novel)
- Starring: Carlos Cores; Elsa Daniel
- Cinematography: Alberto Etchebehere
- Edited by: Jorge Garate
- Music by: Teddy Giorgio
- Distributed by: Argentina Sono Film
- Release date: 1955
- Running time: 100 minutes
- Country: Argentina
- Language: Spanish

El Juramento de Lagardere is a 1955 Argentine film directed by León Klimovsky, based on a screenplay by Emilio Villalba Welsh after the French novel Le Bossu -El jorobado by Paul Féval. The film stars Carlos Cores, Elsa Daniel, Andres Mejuto and Golde Flami, and premiered on December 11, 1955.

== Plot ==
Set in the 17th century, the film is about the adventures of the French knight Henri de Lagardere. He disguises himself as a hunchback character, to avenge the death of a friend, and an affair with his widow.

== Cast ==
- Carlos Cores as Enrique de Lagardere
- Elsa Daniel as Aurora de Nevers
- Andrés Mejuto as Duque de Gonzaga
- Golde Flami as María de Cailou
- Ricardo Castro Ríos as Felipe de Nevers
- Ernesto Bianco as Marcel
- Tito Licausi
- André Norevó
- Mariano Vidal Molina
- Miguel Ligero as Pascual
- Benito Cibrián
- Pepita Meliá as Reina Regente
- Nathán Pinzón as Josafat
- Fernando Segundo
- Festik Kuc

== Reception ==
Set magazine opined (translated from Spanish): "A book already taken to the international screen with other versions with famous interpreters. At this point it detracts from our values, whose effort would have been better applied to more attractive and more Argentinean themes". NG wrote that "It lacks sincerity, for not keeping the style demanded in such demonstrations, indispensable agility in movements, and in the handling of the sword."
