= Gatica, el mono =

1993 film by Leonardo Favio

- DVD cover
- Directed by: Leonardo Favio
- Written by: Leonardo Favio
- Starring: Edgardo Nieva
- Cinematography: Alberto Basail
- Edited by: Darío Tedesco
- Music by: Pérez Prado; Iván Wyszogrod
- Production company: Choila Producciones Cinematográficas
- Distributed by: Transmundo Films
- Release date: 13 May 1993
- Running time: 136 minutes
- Country: Argentina
- Language: Spanish
- Box office: $1.1 million (Argentina)

Gatica, el mono is a 1993 Argentine drama film directed by Leonardo Favio. It is a biopic of Argentine boxer José María Gatica.

It won the Silver Condor for Best Film. It was selected as the Argentine entry for the Best Foreign Language Film at the 66th Academy Awards, but Leonardo Favio asked the Instituto Nacional de Cinematografía (INC) to remove it as a nominee in order to protest in delays of the Congress' approval of the Foreign Films taxes.

In a survey of the 100 greatest films of Argentine cinema carried out by the Museo del Cine Pablo Ducrós Hicken in 2000, the film reached the 24th position. In a new version of the survey organized in 2022 by the specialized magazines La vida útil, Taipei and La tierra quema, presented at the Mar del Plata International Film Festival, it reached the 20th position.

== Cast ==
- Edgardo Nieva as Gatica
- Horacio Taicher as El Ruso
- Juan Costa as Jesús Gatica
- María Eva Gatica as Madre
- Erasmo Olivera as Gatica (teen)
- Kika Child as Ema
- Virginia Innocenti as Nora
- Adolfo Yanelli as El Rosarino

== See also ==
- List of submissions to the 66th Academy Awards for Best Foreign Language Film
- List of Argentine submissions for the Academy Award for Best Foreign Language Film
