= Dark River (1952 film) =

- Theatrical release poster
- Directed by: Hugo del Carril
- Screenplay by: Eduardo Borrás
- Based on: El río oscuro by Alfredo Varela
- Produced by: Hugo del Carril
- Starring: Hugo del Carril; Adriana Benetti; Raúl del Valle
- Cinematography: José María Beltrán
- Edited by: Gerardo Rinaldi
- Music by: Tito Ribero
- Distributed by: Cinematográfica Cinco; Del Carril-Barbieri
- Release date: 9 October 1952
- Running time: 91 minutes
- Country: Argentina
- Language: Spanish

Dark River (Spanish: Las aguas bajan turbias) is a 1952 Argentine drama film directed by Hugo del Carril, starring del Carril, Adriana Benetti and Raúl del Valle. It is based on a novel by Alfredo Varela. The storyline is about exploitation of peons, and the film has a populist message that ties in with the director's sympathy for Peronism. The film won the Silver Condor Award for Best Film.

One of the most emblematic films of Argentine classical cinema, it was selected as the sixth greatest Argentine film of all time in a poll conducted by the Museo del Cine Pablo Ducrós Hicken in 1977, while it ranked 4th in the 1984 edition and 3rd in the 2000 edition. In a new version of the survey organized in 2022 by the specialized magazines La vida util, Taipei and La tierra quema, presented at the Mar del Plata International Film Festival, the film reached the 14 position.

== Synopsis ==
The brothers Santos and Rufino Peralta are used like animals in the workplace at the Parana Stop. There they encounter enormous hardship and inhuman conditions of work as a consequence of the immense greed of the managers. A worker's rebellion is maturing, to the point that it is developed into trade union of workers who respond against their grief. Finally, the workers plot a counterattack and punish their corrupt employers.

== Cast ==
- Hugo del Carril as Santos Peralta
- Adriana Benetti as Amelia
- Raúl del Valle as Aguilera
- Pedro Laxalt as Rufino Peralta
- Gloria Ferrandiz as Doña Flora
- Eloy Álvarez as Alí
- Herminia Franco as Flor de Lis
- Luis Otero as A Peon
- Joaquín Petrocino as Barreiro
- Francisco Audenino
- Carlos Escobares
- Mecha López
- Domingo Garibotto as Amelia's Father
- Jacinto Aicardi
- Ricardo Carenzo

== Production ==
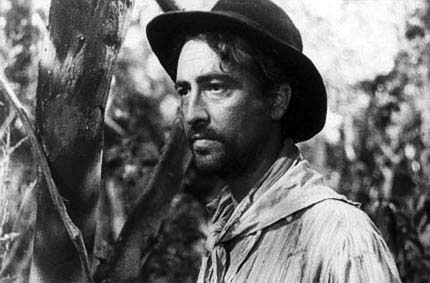
Hugo del Carril in the film

The film is based on a novel by Alfredo Varela, but Varela is not mentioned in the credits because he was in prison as a consequence of his communist activities. The film was shot on location in the upper Paraná region.

== Release ==
The film premiered on 9 October 1952 in Buenos Aires and on 25 February 1956 in the United States. It was distributed by Cinematográfica Cinco and Del Carril-Barbieri (DCB) in Argentina and the Times Film Corporation in the United States. Argentina released the film again in 2005 at the Mar del Plata Film Festival on 11 March 2005.

== Reception ==
=== Critical response ===
A. H. Weiler of The New York Times wrote that the film "makes its points realistically and, occasionally, with harrowing effects" but "is somewhat less than striking as professionally-wrought drama". "As a tract against man's inhumanity to man," Weiler wrote, "it is sincere and powerful. But the spinning of this somber tale, like its outrages, is routine and more primitive than polished." The critic wrote about the performances: "Although Señor Del Carril has not extracted outstanding performances from some of his principals, his portrayal is restrained yet forceful. And, while the climactic scene is rudimentary melodrama, some of his supporting players contribute seemingly dedicated characterizations."

=== Accolades ===
The film received the awards for Best Picture, Director and Supporting Actor (Pedro Laxalt) from the Argentine Academy of Cinematography Arts and Sciences. It received four awards, including Best Film and Best Director, from the Argentine Film Critics Association in 1953. It also won a Special Mention at the Venice Film Festival.
