= Dalmiro =

Dalmiro is a given name. Notable people with the name include:

- Dalmiro Finol (1920–1994), Venezuelan baseball player
- Dalmiro Sáenz (1926–2016), Argentinian writer and playwright
- Dalmiro Videla Balaguer (1905–1994), Argentinian military personnel
