= El romance del Aniceto y la Francisca =

1967 film directed and written by Leonardo Favio

El Romance del Aniceto y la Francisca
- Directed by: Leonardo Favio
- Written by: Leonardo Favio
- Based on: El cenizo by Jorge Zuhair Jury
- Produced by: Armando Bresky; Walter Achugar
- Starring: Federico Luppi; Elsa Daniel; María Vaner; Edgardo Suárez
- Cinematography: Juan José Stagnaro
- Edited by: Antonio Ripoll; Armando Blanco
- Music by: Los Wawancó
- Production company: Renacimiento Films
- Release date: 1 June 1967
- Running time: 63 minutes
- Country: Argentina
- Language: Spanish

Este es el romance del Aniceto y la Francisca, de cómo quedó trunco, comenzó la tristeza y unas pocas cosas más..., or simply El Romance del Aniceto y la Francisca, is a 1967 Argentine romantic drama film directed and written by Leonardo Favio, based on the short story El cenizo by Jorge Zuhair Jury. The film stars Federico Luppi, Elsa Daniel, María Vaner and Edgardo Suárez.

== Premise ==
A love story from a small town where Aniceto, accustomed to solitude, finds himself entangled in a seductive dance between the decency and sweetness of Francisca, also known as "La Santita", and the fiery allure of Lucía, his provocative muse.

== Cast ==
- Federico Luppi as Aniceto
- Elsa Daniel as Francisca
- María Vaner as Lucía
- Edgardo Suárez as Renato

== Awards ==
Year	Award	Category	Recipient(s)	Result	Ref.
1968	Argentine Film Critics Association	Best Film	El Romance del Aniceto y la Francisca	Won	
1968	Argentine Film Critics Association	Best Actor	Federico Luppi	Won	
1968	Argentine Film Critics Association	Best Actress	Elsa Daniel	Won	
1968	Argentine Film Critics Association	Best Supporting Actor	Edgardo Suárez	Won	

== Recognition ==
It was selected as the 9th Greatest Argentine Film of All Time in a poll conducted by the Museo del Cine Pablo Ducrós Hicken in 1984, while it ranked 5th in the 2000 edition.

In a new version of the survey organized in 2022 by specialized magazines La vida util, Taipei and La tierra quema, presented at the Mar del Plata International Film Festival, the film reached the 13th position.

In an interview with Vulture, filmmaker Guillermo del Toro expressed admiration for the film and for Federico Luppi's performance.

== Remake ==
Aniceto, a remake of the film also directed by Favio, was released in 2008.
