= La caída =

1959 film

- Directed by: Leopoldo Torre Nilsson
- Written by: Beatriz Guido; Leopoldo Torre Nilsson
- Produced by: Adolfo Cabrera; Leopoldo Torre Nilsson
- Starring: Elsa Daniel
- Cinematography: Alberto Etchebehere
- Edited by: Jorge Gárate
- Release date: 26 February 1959
- Running time: 84 minutes
- Country: Argentina
- Language: Spanish

La caída ("The Fall") is a 1959 Argentine drama film directed by Leopoldo Torre Nilsson. It won the Silver Condor Award for Best Film was entered into the 9th Berlin International Film Festival.

In a survey of the 100 greatest films of Argentine cinema carried out by the Museo del Cine Pablo Ducrós Hicken in 2000, the film reached the 38th position.

== Cast ==
- Elsa Daniel - Albertina
- Duilio Marzio - José María
- Lautaro Murúa - Uncle Lucas
- Lydia Lamaison - Marta
- Hebe Marbec - Laura
- Oscar Orlegui - Diego
- Carlos López Monet - Gustavo (as Carlos Monet)
- Mariela Reyes
- Mónica Grey
- Nora Singerman
- Pinky - Delfina
- Óscar Robledo
- Emma Bernal - Tía
- Enrique Kossi
- Miguel Caiazzo
- Mónica Linares
