= En la ardiente oscuridad (film) =

- Directed by: Daniel Tinayre
- Release date: 1958
- Running time: 90 minute
- Country: Argentina
- Language: Spanish

En la ardiente oscuridad (In the Burning Darkness) is a 1958 Argentine film based on a play of the same name by Antonio Buero Vallejo.

== Plot ==
This conventional drama by director Daniel Tinayre handles a distinctive subject—the onset of blindness in an adult—and raises issues about the disability without diving far under the surface. The setting is an institution for the blind, and the featured protagonist is a man who rails against his misfortune, his energy and thinking distorted by a need to fight his blindness. Unhappy and unable to come to grips with his condition, he stirs a sympathetic chord in another blind inmate. She in turn, slowly enters into a relationship with him that starts to transform the ways he perceives himself and his blindness.

== Cast ==
- Mirtha Legrand
- Lautaro Murúa
- Duilio Marzio
- Luisa Vehil
- Elida Gay Palmer
- María Vaner
- Leonardo Favio
- Ignacio Quirós
- Nora Massi
- Osvaldo Terranova
- Enrique Kossi
- Isidro Fernán Valdez
- Omar Tovar
- Alberto Rinaldi
