= Recordando =

Studio album by Shaila Dúrcal
- Released: September 2, 2006
- Recorded: 2005–2006
- Label: EMI

Shaila Dúrcal chronology
| Shaila (2004) | Recordando (2006) | Tanto Amor (2008) |

Recordando is the second studio album by Shaila Dúrcal. It was released on September 2, 2006. A special edition was released on February 26, 2008.

== Track listing ==
=== Standard Edition ===
1. No Sirvo Para Estar Sin Ti
2. Volverte A Ver
3. Déjame Vivir
4. Amor Eterno
5. Si Yo Tuviera Rosas
6. Como Tu Mujer
7. Jamás Me Cansaré De Ti
8. Por Ti
9. Tarde
10. No Lastimes Más
11. Vuélvete La Luna
12. Costumbres

=== Special Edition ===
1. No Sirvo Para Estar Sin Ti
2. Volverte A Ver
3. Déjame Vivir
4. Amor Eterno
5. Si Yo Tuviera Rosas
6. Como Tu Mujer
7. Jamás Me Cansaré De Ti
8. Por Ti
9. Tarde
10. No Lastimes Más
11. Vuélvete La Luna
12. Costumbres
13. Vivir Así Es Morir De Amor
14. Si Nos Dejan
15. Volver Volver
16. De Que Manera Te Olvido
17. Sola

DVD Track list

1. No Sirvo Para Estar Sin Ti
2. Vuélvete La Luna
3. Por Ti
4. EPK Un Dia En La Gira De Shaila Dúrcal
5. Entrevista Personal En Casa de Shaila Dúrcal
