= Dalmiro Sáenz =

Argentine novelist and playwright (1926-2016)

Dalmiro Antonio Sáenz (June 13, 1926 – September 11, 2016) was an Argentine novelist and playwright.

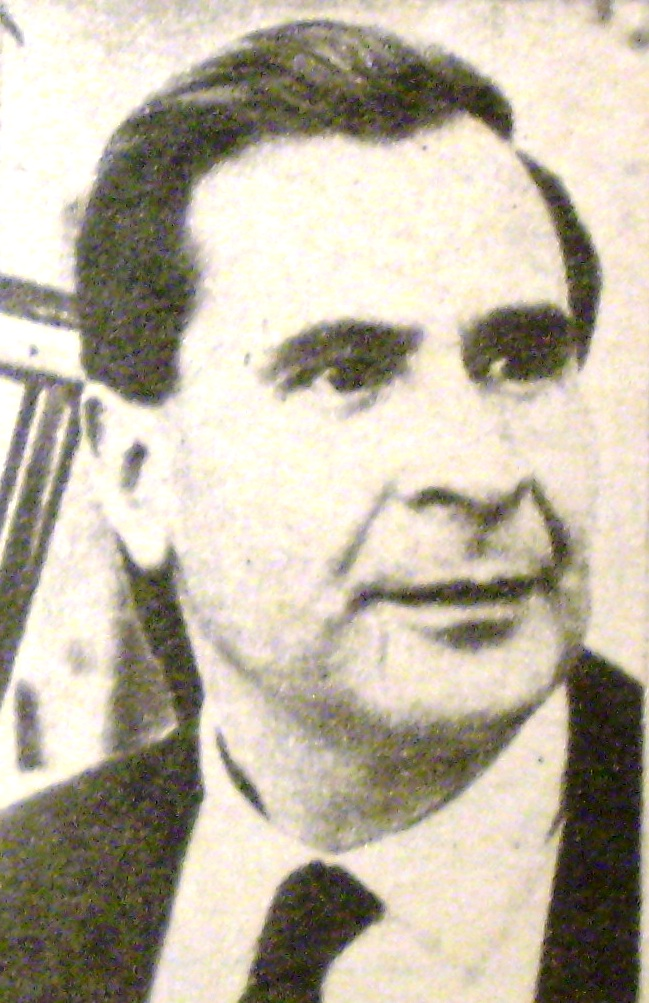
Image of Dalmiro Antonio Sáenz

== Biography ==
Dalmiro Antonio Saenz was born in Buenos Aires, in 1926. He began his literary activity early on, and began to publish by his 30s after he traveled during several seasons by ship through Patagonia, he settled there for almost 15 years, where he developed his first storybook: "Seventy Times Seven," which won the prestigious award of Editorial Emecé, and became a bestseller, based in a vision that is violent, erotic, and with solid precepts and moral questions about religion. That is what would become the hallmark of Sáenz for several years. The critics agree in indicating that a religious axis always passes through the stories of this author; either through one of his characters or as in "Christ Pie", where religiosity is in controversy with the established religion, as opposed to the individual dialogue that the character has with God). Later on, he participated in the screenplay adaptation for the big screen of the two stories in "Seventy Times Seven", that were joined to assemble the frame for the homonymous film directed by Leopoldo Torre Nilsson (1962).

After this onset, Sáenz won the Award of Life magazine in Spanish, in 1963, with his storybook "No".

The same year, he won the award Argentores by the Sociedad Argentina de Autores with "Thirty Thirty", a tale raised in the manner of an American western, but located in Patagonia.

In 1964 he published in the Editorial Emecé The Necessary Sin, a novel that was later adapted to create the script for the film version, called Nobody heard Cecilio Fuentes scream directed by Fernando Siro, and winner of the Silver Shell (Concha de Plata) in the International Film Festival of San Sebastian, Spain (1965). Then he began to write plays and very soon he was awarded the prize “Casa de las Américas”, in Cuba in 1966, with Hip Hip Ufa, published by Editorial Emecé, and was adapted to create the script for the film version with the title Ufa con el sexo (1968) under the direction of Rodolfo Kuhn. Then he worked again in its adaptation with Pablo Silva, for the well-known play "Sex, Lies and Money" (Bs As. 2002/3).

According to his statements, Sáenz took literary vacations between books by writing small books of humor, which were very successful. Among them stands out "I Also Was A Spermatozoid" published by the editorial Torres Agüero. Then began an intimate and detailed description of the feminine universe, with a vision that is surprising and original, and promptly became a bestseller titled "Open Letter To My Future Ex-wife" published by editorial Emecé in 1968, and re-edited several times, until the last version in 1999. Saenz is an author who can capture the essence of the feminine sensibility, characters that he treats with a great deal of tenderness.

His next play Who me? was published in 1969 and re-edited by Gargoyle editions in 2004, was played almost without interruption since its publication, and it became a classic of the absurd in the Argentine theater scene. He also worked as a screenwriter for various characters, including one for comic actor Luis Sandrini in the film Kuma-ching, under the direction of Daniel Tinayre.

When Argentina was under military dictatorship between 1976 and 1983, Sáenz received death threats and had to leave the country in exile. After touring for a while, he settled in Punta del Este, Uruguay. During that period he did not write at all.

He returns in 1983 with the historical novel "El Argentinazo", winning the “Faja de Honor” of the SADE (Sociedad Argentina de Escritores) that later would become a play, in which he worked together with Francisco Javier, director of the piece, in its adaptation, staged by his group Los Volatineros (The Acrobats) at the Cervantes National Theatre in 1985.

Then he returns to police stories, already hinted in his early tales, with "On His Open Eyelids Walked A Fly" a novel of 1986, that also turned into a theatrical version, written by Saenz and entitled “The Boludas", also turned into a film. And "the Satyr of The Roaring Laugh" based on real events.

Later on, he began to investigate the Dead Sea Scrolls and the figure of Jesus Christ in association with Dr. Alberto Cormillot. They traveled together through Israel, Egypt, and New York, interviewing personalities related to the subject, and all of this led to the publication of "Christ standing" (Editorial Planeta 1995 and 1998).

Later he continues its unique, human, erotic, and poetic vision of the Argentine caudillos in his historical novels "The Wrong Patria" (Editorial Planeta, 1991), " White Malón " (Editorial Emecé 1995) and "My Forgetfulness / O what General Paz Didn’t Said In His Memoirs "(1998, Editorial Sudamericana).

In 2004 he published "As A Writer" with some formulas on how he wrote his best stories, and the novel "Pastor Of Bats" (Gárgola Ediciones, 2005)

Many of his works have been translated and published in different languages, and his stories show up in numerous compilations, as in "Latin Blood" by Donald Yates (The best crime and detective stories of South America / Editorial Herder and Herder New York 1972); or "The Best Patagonian Narrations" by Mary Belts & Cristian Aliaga, Editorial Ameghino Buenos Aires 1988, among others. He currently lives in Buenos Aires, Argentina, where he works as a writer, coordinates its literary workshop and also makes cultural commentaries on the radio, in addition to writing articles as free-lance for the most prestigious newspapers and magazines. A prolific writer and author of numerous bestselling, the plays of Dalmiro Sáenz are among the most represented in Argentina. His style is characterized by a relentless sarcasm accompanied by a hilarity that reaches absurdity.

He died on 11 September 2016 at the age of 90.
