= The ABC of Love =

1967 film by Rodolfo Kuhn, Eduardo Coutinho

- Directed by: Eduardo Coutinho; Rodolfo Kuhn; Helvio Soto
- Written by: Roberto Arlt; Eduardo Coutinho; Carlos Del Peral; César Fernández Moreno; Rodolfo Kuhn; Helvio Soto; Francisco Urondo
- Produced by: Jose Luis Contereras; Leon Hirszman; Marcelo Simonetti; Helvio Soto
- Starring: Jorge Rivera López; Vera Vianna; Reginaldo Faria; Susana Rinaldi; Federico Luppi
- Cinematography: Fernando Bellet; Dib Lufti; Juan José Stagnaro
- Edited by: Nello Melli; Antonio Ripoll
- Music by: Tito Ledermann; Oscar López Ruiz; Sidney Waismann
- Distributed by: Difilm
- Release date: 7 September 1967 (Argentina)
- Running time: 95 minutes
- Countries: Argentina; Brazil
- Language: Spanish

The ABC of Love (Portuguese: ABC do amor, Spanish: Noche terrible) is a 1967 Brazilian-Argentine drama film directed by Eduardo Coutinho, Rodolfo Kuhn, and Helvio Soto. It stars Jorge Rivera López and Bárbara Mujica. The film revolves around a suicide pact and a marriage.

The film premiered in June 1967 at the 17th Berlin International Film Festival, where it was nominated for the Golden Bear. It was released in Argentina on 7 September 1967. It was also released in Brazil and later in Chile.

== Cast ==
- Jorge Rivera López
- Vera Vianna
- Reginaldo Faria
- Susana Rinaldi
- Federico Luppi
- Joffre Soares
- Héctor Pellegrini
- Isabel Ribeiro
- Mário Petráglia
- María Luisa Robledo
- Corrado Corradi
- Marta Gam
- Cláudio MacDowell
- Gloria Pratt
- Adriana Aizemberg
