= The Terrace =

1963 film

- Directed by: Leopoldo Torre Nilsson
- Written by: Beatriz Guido; Leopoldo Torre Nilsson; Ricardo Luna; Ricardo Becher
- Story by: Beatriz Guido
- Produced by: Juan Sires; German Szulem
- Starring: Graciela Borges; Leonardo Favio; Marcela López Rey; Héctor Pellegrini
- Cinematography: Ignacio Souto
- Edited by: Jacinto Cascales
- Music by: Jorge López Ruiz
- Release date: 1963
- Running time: 90 minutes
- Country: Argentina
- Language: Spanish

The Terrace (Spanish: La terraza) is a 1963 Argentine drama film directed by Leopoldo Torre Nilsson and starring Graciela Borges, Leonardo Favio, Marcela López Rey and Héctor Pellegrini. It was entered into the 13th Berlin International Film Festival.

== Cast ==
- Graciela Borges – Claudia
- Leonardo Favio – Rodolfo
- Marcela López Rey – Vicky
- Héctor Pellegrini – Alberto
- Dora Baret – Valeria
- Norberto Suárez – Luis
- Enrique Liporace – Horacio
- Luis Walmo – Pablo
- Mirtha Dabner – Mercedes
- Óscar Caballero – Guille
- Belita – Herself
- Susana Brunetti – Cuban woman
- Bernardo Kullock – Gaspar
- Fernando Vegal – Father Alfonso
- Maria Esther Duckse – Grandmother
- Alfredo Tobares – Alberto's Father
