= Alejandra Boero =

Argentine theater actress and director

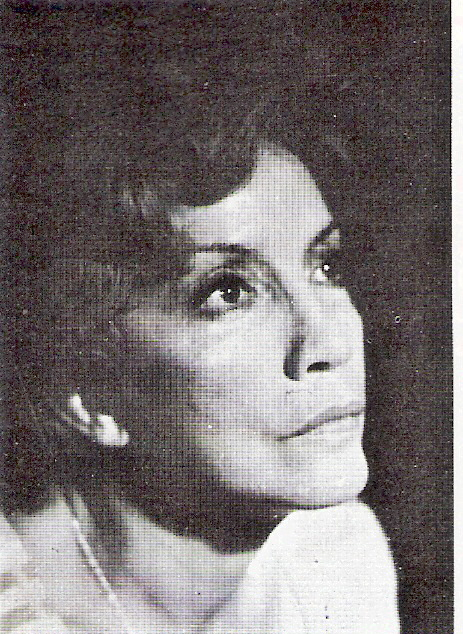
- Born: December 9, 1918; Buenos Aires, Argentina.
- Died: May 4, 2006 (aged 87)
- Occupation: Actress

Alejandra Boero (December 9, 1918 – May 4, 2006) was an Argentine theater actress and director born in Buenos Aires.

Her career started in 1942 at the La Máscara theater. In 1950 she founded Nuevo Teatro, an institution that aimed to renew stage forms and built two theaters in Buenos Aires. She acted or directed more than 40 plays and then, in 1970, she founded a drama school and the experimental Andamio 90 theater.

Besides her work in theater, she acted in three films: Todo sol es amargo (1966), Don Segundo Sombra (1969), and La Película (1975).

Boero received the Konex Award and the Molière Award, and was also named Illustrious Citizen of Buenos Aires. She died at the age of 87, having suffered for many years of pulmonary hypertension.
