= Amor y un poco más =

- Directed by: Derlis M. Beccaglia
- Written by: Augusto Giustozzi
- Starring: Olga Zubarry; Elsa Daniel
- Release date: 1968
- Country: Argentina
- Language: Spanish

Amor y un poco más (English language:Love and A Little More) is a 1968 Argentine film directed by Derlis M. Beccaglia and written by Augusto Giustozzi. Starring Olga Zubarry and Elsa Daniel.

== Release ==
The film premiered in Argentina in May 1968.

== Cast ==
- Atilio Marinelli
- Elsa Daniel
- Gilda Lousek
- Fernando Siro
- Olga Zubarry
- Marcela López Rey
- Vicente Rubino
- Enzo Viena
