= Love Never Dies (1955 film) =

- Mirtha Legrand and Alfredo Alcón in a still from the film.
- Spanish: El amor nunca muere
- Directed by: Luis César Amadori
- Written by: Luis César Amadori; Pedro Miguel Obligado; Luis Martin de San Vicente
- Produced by: Eduardo Bedoya
- Starring: Zully Moreno; Mirtha Legrand; Tita Merello; Alfredo Alcón
- Cinematography: Francis Boeniger
- Edited by: Ricardo Rodríguez Nistal; Atilio Rinaldi
- Music by: Tito Ribero
- Distributed by: Artistas Argentinos Asociados
- Release date: August 11, 1955
- Running time: 124 minutes
- Country: Argentina
- Language: Spanish

Love Never Dies (Spanish: El amor nunca muere) is a 1955 Argentine romantic drama film directed by Luis César Amadori, written by Amadori with Pedro Miguel Obligado and starring Zully Moreno, Tita Merello, Mirtha Legrand and Alfredo Alcón.

== Cast ==
- Zully Moreno
- Mirtha Legrand
- Tita Merello
- Carlos Cores
- Duilio Marzio
- Alfredo Alcón
- José De Angelis
- Héctor Méndez
- Enrique Chaico
- Carmen Monteleone
- Herminia Franco
- Juan Bono
- Benito Cibrián
- Marta González (Uncredited)
- José Maurer
- Aída Villadeamigo
