= Corazón Ranchero =

Studio album by Shaila Dúrcal
- Released: June 23, 2009
- Recorded: 2008–2009
- Genres: Regional Mexican, mariachi
- Label: EMI

Shaila Dúrcal chronology
Tanto Amor (2008)	Corazón Ranchero (2009)

Corazón Ranchero is the fourth studio album by Shaila Dúrcal. It was released on June 23, 2009. The album received a Grammy nomination for Best Regional Mexican Album at the 52nd Annual Grammy Awards. It also garnered a Latin Grammy nomination for Best Ranchero Album at the Latin Grammy Awards of 2009.

== Track listing ==
1. Cenizas
2. Tatuajes
3. Tu Infame Engaño
4. Y Llegaste Tú
5. Dos Coronas A Mi Madre
6. Las Llaves De Mi Alma
7. Tu Cárcel
8. Verdad Que Duele
9. Un Dolor
10. En Mi Viejo San Juan
11. Tu Cárcel (Versión Pop)
12. Tatuajes (Versión Pop)
