= Humo de Marihuana =

- Film poster
- Directed by: Lucas Demare
- Written by: Wilfredo Jiménez
- Starring: Carlos Estrada; Marcela López Rey; Thelma Biral; Sergio Renán
- Cinematography: Américo Hoss
- Edited by: Jorge Gárate
- Production company: Argentina Sono Film S.A.C.I.
- Release date: 17 May 1968
- Running time: 105 minutes
- Country: Argentina
- Language: Spanish

Humo de Marihuana (English: Marijuana Smoke) is an Argentine black-and-white film directed by Lucas Demare. The film was released on May 17, 1968.

== Plot ==
A doctor investigates the death of his wife and realizes that drugs were beginning to affect the country.

== Cast ==
- Carlos Estrada ...Carlos Ocampo
- Marcela López Rey ...Fabiana
- Thelma Biral ...Marcela
- Sergio Renán ...Julián Macedo
- Héctor Pellegrini ...Martínez
- Enrique Fava ...Di Pietro
- Horacio Nicolai
- Juan Carlos Galván ...Marco
- Zelmar Gueñol ...Police
- Elida Marletta ...Strip teaser
- Fabiana Gavel ...Fabiana's sister
- David Llewellyn ...Chico
- Guillermo Helbling ...Jorge
