= Las Locas del conventillo =

- Directed by: Fernando Ayala
- Written by: Augusto Giustozzi
- Release date: 1966
- Running time: 103 minute
- Country: Argentina
- Language: Spanish

Las Locas del conventillo is a 1966 Argentine film scored by Astor Piazzolla.

== Cast ==
- Analía Gadé as Lola
- Alberto de Mendoza as Manuel
- Vicente Parra as Manolo
- Concha Velasco as María (as Conchita Velasco)
- José María Ruiz Isasi as José M. Ruiz Isasi
- Daniel Santalucía as Daniel Santa Lucía
- Raúl Ricutti as Raúl Ricuti
- Juan Alberto Domínguez as Juan A. Domínguez
- Cacho Espíndola as Óscar Espíndola
- Mecha Ortiz as Tía Remedios
- Irma Córdoba as Tía Soledad

== Bibliography ==
- Manrupe, Raúl; Portela, María Alejandra (1995). Un diccionario de films argentinos (in Spanish). Corregidor. ISBN 978-950-05-0896-4.
