= Alfredo Varela (Argentine writer) =

Argentine writer

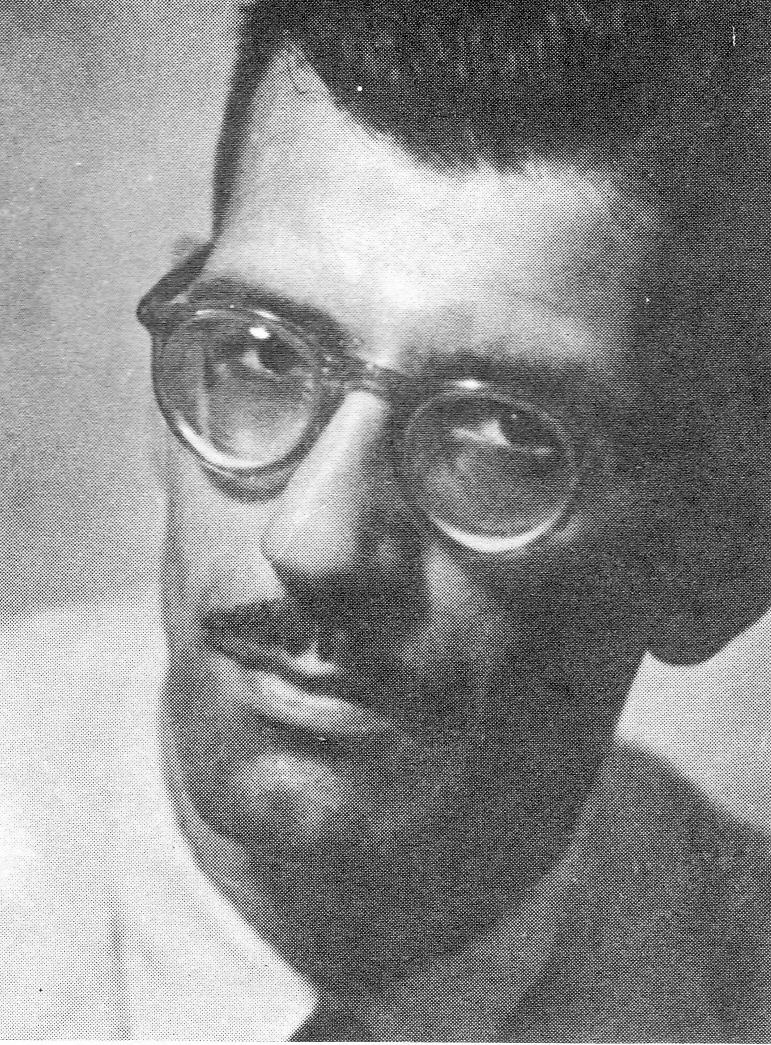
Alfredo Varela

Alfredo Varela (24 September 1914 – 25 February 1984) was an Argentine writer. A communist, he won the Lenin Peace Prize 1970-1971 and was awarded with the Order of Friendship of Peoples by the Soviet Union. His most famous novel was The Dark River (Spanish: Río oscuro; German: Die Matepflücker oder der dunkle Fluß), adapted into a film by his friend Hugo del Carril in 1952 as Las aguas bajan turbias.

He was born in Buenos Aires in 1914. He started as a journalist in Crítica newspaper. He was jailed many times due to his communist activities.
