= Ufa con el sexo =

1968 film

- Directed by: Rodolfo Kuhn
- Written by: Rodolfo Kuhn
- Based on: Hip Hip Ufa by Dalmiro Sáenz
- Starring: Elsa Daniel; Héctor Pellegrini; Marilina Ross
- Cinematography: Adelqui Camuso
- Edited by: Armando Blanco
- Production company: Trama Producciones
- Release date: 1968
- Running time: 90 min.
- Country: Argentina
- Language: Spanish

Ufa con el sexo ("Enough with sex") is a 1968 Argentine comedy film directed by Rodolfo Kuhn.

== Plot ==
The film narrates the story of a young bourgeois man who uses deceit in order to seduce women and is shocked when he finds out he himself is the victim of an appearance.

== Cast ==
- Elsa Daniel as Evangelina
- Héctor Pellegrini as Juan Adams
- Marilina Ross as Guillermina
- Maurice Jouvet as Mr. Eliot
- Iris Marga as Madre de Juan Adams
- Jorge Rivera López as Dr. Casini
- Nacha Guevara as Cantante de café concert
- Silvia Piñeiro
- Emilio Gaete as Padre de Juan Adams
- María Vargas
- Mora Furtado
- Nissim Sharim
- Jaime Celedón
- Lili Gacel
- Luis Guthmann
- Arnaldo André
- Ana María Vinokur
- Luis Politti
- Graciela Martinez
- Alicia Romano
- Tony Vilas as Vendedor de camas
- Cristina Larreta
- Roberto Braceras
- Danilo Gale
- Karin

== Censorship ==
Although Ufa con el sexo does not include any nudity or sex scenes, Argentina banned the film, which includes themes of love and prostitution, for violating morality standards. It was not shown in the country until 2007.
