= El jefe (1958 film) =

Argentine crime film

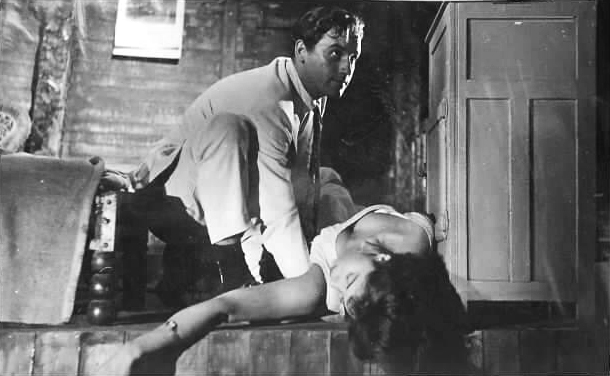
- Directed by: Fernando Ayala
- Written by: Fernando Ayala; David Viñas
- Produced by: Fernando Ayala; Héctor Olivera
- Starring: Alberto de Mendoza
- Production company: Aries Cinematográfica Argentina
- Release date: October 23, 1958 (Argentina)
- Running time: 90
- Country: Argentina
- Language: Spanish

El jefe (transl. The boss) is a 1958 Argentine crime drama film directed by Fernando Ayala. The film follows a group of petty criminals and their boss, played by Alberto de Mendoza. The dynamic between the group of young criminals and their masculine, charismatic leader has widely been interpreted as a criticism of Peronist government in 1950s Argentina.

The film was well-received, winning the Silver Condor Award from the Argentine Film Critics Association and Best Film in Spanish at the Mar del Plata International Film Festival. It has often been included on lists of the greatest Argentine films.
