= Héctor Pellegrini =

Argentine actor

- Born: 6 August 1931; Buenos Aires, Argentina
- Died: 1 November 1999 (aged 68); Mar del Plata, Argentina
- Years active: 1961–1988

Héctor Pellegrini (6 August 1931 – 1 November 1999) was an Argentine film actor.

Pellegrini rose to fame in the 1961 acclaimed film Alias Gardelito and made over 50 appearances mostly in film between 1961 and 1988.

== Partial filmography ==
- Alias Gardelito (1961)
- La Flor de Irupé (1962)
- The Terrace (1963)
- Aconcagua (1964)
- Pajarito Gómez (1965)
- Un Lugar al sol (1965)
- The ABC of Love (1967)
- Humo de Marihuana (1968)
- Ufa con el sexo (1968)
- El Santo de la Espada (1970)
- Los Neuróticos (1971)
- Bajo el signo de la patria (1971)
- Rebellion in Patagonia (1974)
- La Película (1975)
- El Fausto criollo (1979)
- Queridas amigas (1980)
- Camila (1984)
- Adiós, Roberto (1985)
- The Loves of Kafka (1988)
