= Shaila Dúrcal =

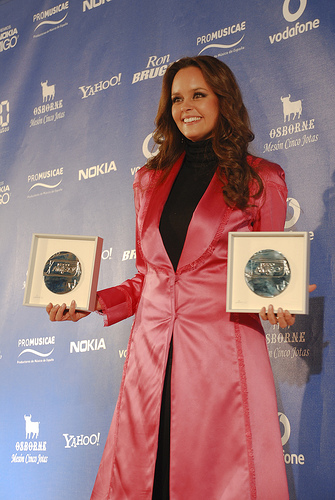

Background information
- Birth name: Shaila de los Ángeles Morales de las Heras
- Also known as: Shaila Dúrcal
- Born: 28 August 1979 (age 45); Madrid, Spain
- Genres: Latin pop; Mariachi
- Occupations: Singer; songwriter
- Instrument: Vocals
- Years active: 2004–present
- Labels: Capitol Latin
- Website: Official website

Shaila de los Ángeles Morales de las Heras (born 28 August 1979), better known as Shaila Dúrcal, is a Spanish singer and songwriter. Her parents are singers Rocío Dúrcal and Antonio Morales ("Junior").

== Biography ==
She was born in Madrid, daughter of Rocío Durcal, made her musical debut at the age of 12 on TVE singing for Nikka Costa. She studied singing under the tutelage of Robert Jeantal before touring extensively with her mother Rocío as a back-up singer throughout Spain, Mexico and the United States. While continuing her studies in Miami, she was courted by several major record labels, recording a series of demos including a session of songs by English songwriter Richard Daniel Roman.

In 2001 she moved to Mexico and signed to BMG who later released her eponymous debut album which was largely ignored by both critics and public alike. This album was followed by Recordando in 2006 on EMI, an album dedicated to her mother and which went straight to number one in Spain, going platinum in its second week after selling over 80,000 singles. She has sold more than 200,000 albums in Spain and 30,000 in Mexico as of 2014. She performed at the Latin Grammy Show, singing "Amor Eterno".

== Discography ==
=== Albums ===
- 2004: Shaila (BMG) No. 99 MÉX
- 2006: Recordando (EMI) No. 1 ESP; No. 52 MÉX; No. 87 USA; No. 36 EUROPA
- 2008: Tanto Amor (EMI) No. 5 ESP; No. 80 MÉX
- 2009: Corazón Ranchero (EMI) No. 30 ESP; No. 27 MÉX
- 2011: Asi
- 2015: Shaila Dúrcal

=== Singles ===
- "No Sirvo Para Estar Sin Ti"
- "Vuélvete La Luna" No. 1 Spain
- "Por Ti"
- "Vivir Asi Es Morir De Amor"
- "Sola"
- "Tanto Cielo Perdido" No. 16 Chile
- "Convenceme"
- "No Me Interesa"

== Charts and sales ==
=== "Recordando" ===
Chart (2006/2007)	Peak	Certification	Sales
US Latin	87		
Spain	1	2× Platinum	+160,000
Mexico	52		+15,000
European Top 100	36		

=== "Tanto Amor" ===
Chart (2008)	Peak	Certification	Sales
Spain	5	Gold	+40,000
Mexico	80		+5,000

=== "Corazón Ranchero" ===
Chart (2009)	Peak	Certification	Sales
Spain	30		+10,000
Mexico	27		+20,000
