= El Caradura y la millonaria =

- Film poster
- Directed by: Enrique Cahen Salaberry
- Written by: Luis César Amadori, Enrique Cahen Salaberry
- Produced by: Eugenio Gersbach, Angel Aloie
- Cinematography: Américo Hoss
- Edited by: Ricardo Rodríguez Nistal
- Music by: Horacio Malvicino
- Production company: Tachis Films
- Distributed by: Lumiere Sudamericana
- Release date: March 6, 1971
- Running time: 1 hr 30 minutes
- Country: Argentina
- Language: Spanish

El Caradura y la millonaria, also known as No estoy enamorada de tí, pero te quiero. is a 1971 Argentine comedy film directed by Enrique Cahen Salaberry. It was one of several films by Cahen Salaberry after his return from Spain to Argentine cinema in the 1960s. The screenplay was written by Luis Cesar Amadori and Antonio Botta. It is a remake of the 1938 film El canillita y la dama. The film premiered on 6 March 1971, and starred Juan Carlos Altavista and María Vaner, with Vaner performing her own songs.

== Plot ==
A wealthy man repents and traces his son from his first wife whom he abandoned while pregnant.

== Cast ==
- Juan Carlos Altavista
- María Vaner
- Santiago Bal
- Aldo Bigatti
- Susana Brunetti
- Pablo Codevila
- Dringue Farías
- Guido Gorgatti
- Fidel Pintos
- Menchu Quesada
- Virginia Romay
- León Sarthié
- Semillita
- Tomás Simari
- Emilio Vidal
- Oscar Villa
- Susana Rubio
