= Plata dulce =

Plata dulce Easy Money
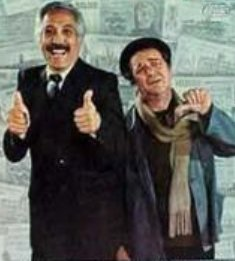
- Federico Luppi and Julio De Grazia in the movie's poster
- Directed by: Fernando Ayala
- Screenplay by: Oscar Viale; Jorge Goldemberg
- Based on: Idea y argumento de Héctor Olivera
- Produced by: Héctor Olivera; Luis Osvaldo Repetto
- Starring: Federico Luppi; Julio De Grazia; Gianni Lunadei; Nora Cullen; Adriana Aizemberg
- Edited by: Eduardo López
- Music by: Emilio Kauderer
- Production company: Aries Cinematográfica Argentina
- Distributed by: Aries Cinematográfica Argentina
- Release date: 8 July 1982
- Running time: 97 minutes
- Country: Argentina
- Language: Spanish

Plata dulce (transl. Easy Money, lit. 'Sweet Money') is an Argentine comedy drama-historic film. It was released on 8 July 1982 and directed by Fernando Ayala, starring Federico Luppi, Julio de Grazia and Gianni Lunadei. It received a Cóndor de Plata award for best film in 1983.

During this historic period in Argentina, many labour rights were suspended and industrial production fell to extremely low levels, while banks started rising and external debt grew practically exponentially. The result of these policy (which aimed for easy money) was one of the biggest financial disasters in the country's history, producing a large loss of its industry and bringing large part of the population into poverty.

== Plot ==
Two businessmen dedicated to manufacturing and selling bathroom cabinets struggle to keep their factory running through a series of deep deindustrialization politics being pushed by the country's military dictatorship. One of them, Carlos Bonifatti, gets a chance at working in a bank and decides to stop manufacturing cabinets and dedicate fully to financial businesses which seem to be rising. The other partner, Rubén Molinuevo, sticks to the factory work. At the beginning the choice seems good for Bonifatti, who highly improves his living standards, but shortly after the tables will turn for both of them.

== Cast ==
- Federico Luppi: Carlos Bonifatti
- Julio De Grazia: Rubén Molinuevo
- Gianni Lunadei: Arteche
- Nora Cullen
- Adriana Aizemberg
- Flora Steinberg
- Alberto Segado
- Hernán Gené
- Marina Skell: Patricia
- Emilio Vidal
- Ricardo Hamlin
- Eduardo Alcoba
- Rubén Cosenza
- Max Berliner

== Awards ==
- Premios Cóndor de Plata 1983: Best film
