= The Grandfather (1954 film) =

- Screenshot
- Directed by: Román Viñoly Barreto
- Written by: Benito Pérez Galdós; Emilio Villalba Welsh
- Produced by: Román Viñoly Barreto
- Starring: Enrique Muiño; Mecha Ortiz; Santiago Gómez Cou; Elsa Daniel
- Cinematography: Aníbal González Paz
- Edited by: Jorge Gárate
- Music by: Juan Ehlert
- Distributed by: Argentina Sono Film S.A.C.I.
- Release date: 2 July 1954
- Running time: 94 minutes
- Country: Argentina
- Language: Spanish

The Grandfather (Spanish: El abuelo) is a 1954 Argentine melodrama film of the classical era of Argentine cinema, directed by Román Viñoly Barreto and written by Emilio Villalba Welsh. It was based on the novel of the same name by Benito Pérez Galdó and stars Enrique Muiño, Mecha Ortiz and Elsa Daniel.

== Cast ==
- Enrique Muiño as Don Rodrigo de Achával
- Mecha Ortiz as Lucrecia Vélez
- Santiago Gómez Cou as narrator
- Elsa Daniel as Dorotea
- Erika Mandel as Leonor
- Florindo Ferrario as Zenén
- Enrique Fava as Prior
- Julián Pérez Ávila as Pio
- José Ruzzo as Venancio
- Amalia Bernabé as Gregoria
- Carlos Lagrotta as Dr. Gutiérrez
- Alberto Barcel as Monseñor
- Pedro Pompillo as Don Carmelo
- Víctor Martucci as Amigo de Lucrecia
- Lina Bardo as Vicenta

== Other adaptations ==
The novel has also been adapted in 1925 and 1998, both by Spanish directors.
