= Gianni Lunadei =

Italian-Argentine actor

- Born: May 1, 1938; Rome, Italy
- Died: June 17, 1998 (aged 60); Buenos Aires, Argentina
- Occupation: Actor
- Website: facebook: Gianni Lunadei

Gianni Lunadei (May 1, 1938 – June 17, 1998) was an Italian Argentine actor. He is considered one of the most versatile actors of his generation, and is best known for his work in Argentine comedy.

== Biography ==
Lunadei was born in Rome in 1938. His mother was a seamstress and his father a brick mason, and the young Lunadei first developed an interest in acting when at age five, his parents introduced him to the cinema and theater. The family struggled during World War II, however, and his mother emigrated to Buenos Aires, Argentina, where Gianni arrived in 1950, followed by his father shortly afterward.

He debuted in the local theater in 1954 playing George in a local production of Arthur Miller's All My Sons, and was later cast in Seán O'Casey's The Shadow of a Gunman and Anton Chekhov's Platonov. His career on the stage flourished, and he worked as a resident actor in the National Comedy for eleven years, and in the General San Martín Theatre for six. Beyond the stage, he had a turn as Count Dracula in a 1968 made-for-television special starring veteran horror film actor Narciso Ibáñez Menta. Among Lunadei's notable stage roles from this era include those in Peter Weiss' Marat/Sade, Carlo Goldoni's Servant of Two Masters, as well as the title role in Pantaleon, a commedia dell'arte work by Argentine playwright Villanueva Cosse. This latter role won Lunadei the city of Mar del Plata's "Star of the Sea" in 1975 with co-star China Zorrilla. He earned a Molière Award for this role, and won a second one in 1977. He married actress Stella Maris Lanzani, and they had four children.

Lunadei ventured into Argentine cinema in 1976 with a minor part in Carlos Galettini's tragedy Juan que reía (Juan Who Once Laughed). He had a leading role in Manuel Antín's Allá lejos y hace tiempo (Long Ago and Far Away, 1978); but in subsequent years he became known for portraying manic characters in picaresque comedy films and on television. Lunadei explained in a 1984 interview that his childhood dream had been to be a clown. One notable exception was his role as the unscrupulous financier Arteche in Fernando Ayala's tragicomic Plata dulce (Sweet Money, 1982), whose title referred to the economic bubble and collapse caused by José Alfredo Martínez de Hoz's financial deregulation policies of the late 1970s.

Lunadei was cast by comedy writer Juan Carlos Mesa in the sitcom Mesa de noticias (News Desk). The prime time show, which premiered on ATC in December 1983, was set in a struggling network news program, where Lunadei played De La Nata, an obsequious correspondent who showered the hapless programming director (Mesa) with compliments such as "benemérito señor director, le pertenezco" ("I belong to you, my honorable director"), while sabotaging coworkers and dispensing ad hominem attacks such as "infeliz!" ("loser!"/"wretch!") and his trademark interjection: "SHAQ!" (typically with a chopping motion of the hand). The sitcom was a success and ran until New Year's Eve 1987, appealing to audiences of an unusually varied demographic.

Lunadei returned to cinema in a 1987 lampoon of profiteering in the medical industry, La clínica del Doctor Cureta, and in a 1988 film adaptation of cartoonist Horacio Altuna'a Las Puertitas del señor López. Lunadei earned a Konex Award for lifetime achievement in comedy in 1991. He then joined Mesa in a spin-off of Mesa de Noticias, El gordo y el flaco (akin to Laurel and Hardy), which aired from 1991 to 1994, and appeared in a number of sitcoms in subsequent years.

However, Lunadei's often manic on-screen persona belied his struggle with clinical depression. Separated from his wife, he began a relationship with television actress Perla Caron in 1993, and in 1997 moved to her Belgrano home. He continued to work despite his worsening condition, and had memorable roles such as in the mystery mini-series Archivo negro (Black File), for which he was nominated for a Martín Fierro Award in 1997, and in the film-noir El inquietante caso de José Blum (The Troubling Case of José Blum). Alone in Perla Caron's home, he shot himself with a .32 caliber pistol on June 17, 1998. Lunadei was interred in the Actors' Pantheon at La Chacarita Cemetery.

The respected stage, television and film actor was renowned in the local entertainment industry for his improvisational skills. A production company operated by Juan Carlos Mesa and others announced that a remake of Mesa de noticias was being considered; Mesa himself expressed that "bringing back a hit such as that inevitably leads to criticism that it's somehow not the same, and it wouldn't be the same: Gianni is no longer here".
