= Susana Brunetti =

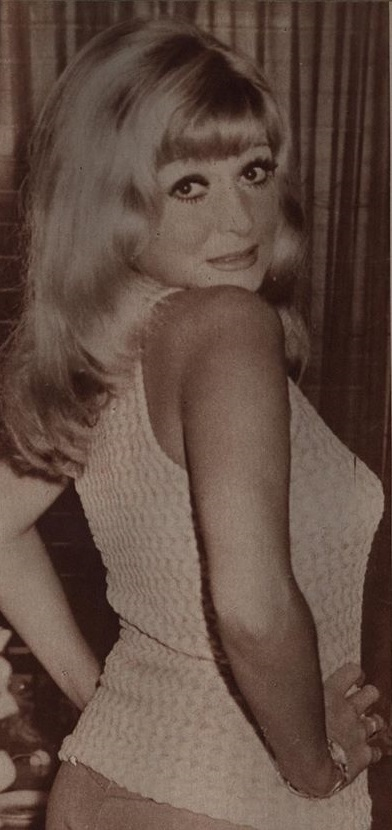
- Susana Brunetti in 1970
- Born: October 25, 1941; Buenos Aires, Argentina
- Died: June 20, 1974 (aged 32); Buenos Aires, Argentina
- Occupation: Actress

Susana Brunetti (1941–1974), was an Argentine vedette, actress and singer, known for the films La fin del mundo (1963), ¿De quiénes son las mujeres? (1972), Este loco, loco, Buenos Aires (1973) and television shows like J.C. Buenos Aires-Roma-Paris (1964), El pastito (1972) and the popular sitcom Gorosito y señora (1973). She died due to cancer on June 20, 1974, in Buenos Aires.

== Filmography ==
=== Film ===
Year	Title	Role	Notes
1962	Hombre de la esquina rosada		
1963	The Terrace	Cuban Woman	
1963	La fin del mundo		
1967	Villa Cariño		
1970	Un gaucho con plata		
1971	El Caradura y la millonaria		
1972	Todos los pecados del mundo		
1972	¿De quiénes son las mujeres?		
1972	Las píldoras		
1973	Este loco, loco, Buenos Aires	Ana María	

=== Television ===
Year	Title	Role	Notes
1973	Gorosito y señora	Gina de Gorosito	TV Series, 19 episodes
