= En la ardiente oscuridad =

1947 play by Antonio Buero Vallejo

En la ardiente oscuridad (In the Burning Darkness) is a play by Antonio Buero Vallejo, written in 1947, which made its debut in the Teatro María Guerrero in Madrid on 1 December 1950. A film of the same name was produced in 1958.

== Synopsis ==
The play centers around Ignacio, who is admitted to an institute for the blind, managed by Don Pablo. Everything there is so perfectly arranged that the students do not mind the fact that they cannot see. Ignacio, however, refuses to accept his blindness and struggles to find his way around. He meets a group of blind people who appear to be happy, but his sense of dissatisfaction at losing the most marvelous of the senses is contagious and spreads through the group.

Carlos, one of the students at the institute, attempts to ease Ignacio's depression but does not succeed. Carlos is suspicious of the friendship between his girlfriend Juana and Ignacio, who ends up seducing her. Juana feels more compassion for Ignacio than anyone else.

One fateful night, Ignacio and Carlos are arguing. Ignacio tries to convey to Carlos what a blind person who longs to see feels, which profoundly disturbs Carlos. Don Pablo and Doña Pepita walk in. Ignacio goes outside to the playground. The remaining three talk for a while and reaffirm the sentiment that Ignacio has to leave. Carlos then also goes out to the playground. Pepita idly stands by the window and sees something that horrifies her.

Suddenly, Ignacio is brought in by other boys, who lay him on the sofa. He is dead—murdered by Carlos because Carlos could not stand Ignacio forcing him to face reality. The immediate assumption is that Ignacio committed suicide. However, Doña Pepita admits to Carlos that she knows he murdered Ignacio but can't confirm it. She says, "It occurred to me to get up and go to the windowsill. I didn't do it. But if I had, I would have seen someone climb the stairs of the slide with the body of Ignacio, unconscious or dead. Later, from above, the body would fall, without thinking about the eyes of others... But I didn't see anything, because I didn't get up."

The uncertainty is never resolved because the students at the school seem content with the accidental ruling. It is only then that Carlos realizes he is more affected by being blind than he was willing to admit, and the play ends with this realization.

== Interpretation ==
The play has been interpreted by some critics as an allegory, with the blindness of the students seen as a metaphor for the Spanish people's "blindness" in their passive acceptance of the Francoist State. The role of Carlos in the play is analogous to that of Franco: like the caudillo, Carlos convinces the blind students into believing they are happy with their current state. Carlos also murders the resistance (i.e., Ignacio), much as Franco ordered the assassination of republican resistance leaders.

One of Buero Vallejo's stage effects in this play is the darkening of the theater during a crucial conversation between Ignacio and Carlos to simulate for the audience the experience of blindness.

== Adaptation ==
The play was adapted for cinema, and the film En la ardiente oscuridad was released in 1958, though not in the United States. Performances of the play in the US are rare; for example, none of Buero Vallejo's plays has been presented on Broadway.

The play has also been adapted as an opera for a cast of 12 singers and piano by composer Omar Najmi. Its world premiere performance took place in Watertown, MA, in 2019, with Najmi singing the role of Ignacio.

A musical adaptation was created, and the production was premiered in Seoul, South Korea in 2023. It was licensed to Japan in 2024.

== Translation ==
An English translation of the play by Dr. Marion P. Holt was published in 1987. This translation had its first staging at the University of Missouri in October 1969.
