= Mi novia el... =

- Promotional poster
- Directed by: Enrique Cahen Salaberry
- Written by: Oscar Viale
- Based on: Victor and Victoria
- Produced by: Enrique Carreras; Nicolás Carreras
- Starring: Alberto Olmedo; Susana Giménez
- Cinematography: Oscar Piruzanto
- Music by: Buddy McCluskey
- Distributed by: Aries Cinematográfica Argentina
- Release date: 13 March 1975
- Running time: 83 minutes
- Country: Argentina
- Language: Spanish

Mi novia el... (My Girlfriend the...) is a 1975 Argentine comedy film. The original title, Mi novia el travesti ("My Girlfriend the Transvestite") was edited by Argentine censors when the film was first released. The original script was about a real travesti supposed to be protagonized by Jorge Perez, a famous travesti under the name of Jorge Perez Evelyn. However, the censorship was so strong that the script was changed and Perez was replaced with actress Susana Giménez.

The plot is based on the 1933 German film Victor and Victoria.

== Plot ==
Alberto is a regular middle-aged man who lives with his elder mother and works at a factory. After a night out where he attends a show by transvestite artist Dominique, he develops an unexpected fixation with the artist. What started out as a loud reaction of disgust and bigotry, slowly turns into him realizing that he is in fact attracted to Dominique. This newfound interest fills Alberto's mind with guilt and doubt, while his coworkers start mocking him for dating a "weirdo", and his family grieve his lost decency. In the midst of Alberto's predicament, a revelation by Dominique will shake the board.

== Cast ==
- Alberto Olmedo as Alberto aka Laucha
- Susana Giménez as Dominique/María Isabel
- Cacho Espíndola as Lince
- Tristán as Alfonso
- Marcos Zucker as Serafín
- Tincho Zabala as Gustavo aka Tordo
- María Rosa Fugazot as Delia
- Menchu Quesada as Alberto's Mother
- Nené Malbrán as Margarita
- Adolfo Linvel as Don Francisco
- Alita Román as María Isabel's Mother
- Pedro Quartucci as María Isabel's Father
- Pablo Cumo
- Ricardo Jordán
- Constanza Maral as Alberto's coworker
- Daniel Miglioranza as Alberto's coworker
- Alfonso Pícaro as Amigo despedida soltero
- Raúl Ricutti
- Jorge Porcel
