= Psexoanálisis =

- Directed by: Héctor Olivera
- Release date: 1968
- Running time: 88 minute
- Country: Argentina
- Language: Spanish

Psexoanálisis is a 1968 Argentine film directed by Héctor Olivera.
