= Tanto amor =

Tanto Amor

Studio album by Shaila Dúrcal
- Released: September 30, 2008
- Recorded: 2007–2008
- Label: EMI

Shaila Dúrcal chronology
Recordando (2006)	Tanto Amor (2008)	Corazón Ranchero (2009)

Tanto Amor is the third studio album by Shaila Dúrcal. It was released on September 30, 2008.

== Track listing ==
1. Para Darte Mi Vida
2. Hasta La Eternidad
3. Hay Milagros
4. Juego Perdido
5. Tanto Amor
6. Pobre Tonto
7. Esperaré Un Poco Más
8. Crees Que Me Engañas
9. Tanto Cielo Perdido
10. Te Quiero Cerca
11. Para Darte Mi Vida (Versión En Portugués)
