= So Feared a Hell =

- Release date: 1980
- Running time: 110 minute
- Country: Argentina
- Language: Spanish

So Feared a Hell (Spanish: El infierno tan temido) is an Argentine drama film from 1980 directed by Raúl de la Torre and starring Graciela Borges and Alberto de Mendoza. It is based on the eponymous short story by Uruguayan writer Juan Carlos Onetti. The film was released on August 7, 1980, and won the Silver Condor Award for Best Film in 1981.

== Summary ==
A young woman sends her ex-husband and other acquaintances cruel photographs of herself engaging in sexual relationships with other men. The resulting degradation pushes him into a desperate situation.

== Cast ==
- Graciela Borges
- Alberto de Mendoza
- Arturo García Buhr
- Ana María Castell
- Nora Cullen
- Delfi Galbiatti
- Augusto Larreta
- Aníbal Morixe
- Flora Steinberg
- Enrique Almada
- Cacho Espíndola
- Pamela M. Jáuregui
- Tacholas
- Ricardo Bartis
- Isidro Fernán Valdez
- Miguel Tarditti
- Gerardo Goldberg
- Oscar Pereyra
- Andrés Barragán
- Lelio Lesser
- Beba Bidart
- Lucrecia Capello
- Jorge Varas
