= Shaila (album) =

Studio album by Shaila Dúrcal
- Released: May 25, 2004
- Recorded: November 2003 – March 2004
- Label: BMG

Shaila Dúrcal chronology
Shaila (2004)	Recordando (2006)

Shaila is the debut studio album by Shaila Dúrcal. It was released in 2004.

== Track listing ==
1. Perdóname
2. Qué Tienes Tú
3. Fuego En Las Venas
4. Si Yo Me Vuelvo A Enamorar
5. Como Vivir Sin Ti
6. Dame Alas
7. Uno En Dos
8. En Ti
9. Se
10. Quédate En Mis Brazos
