= Emilio Villalba Welsh =

Argentine screenwriter

Emilio Villalba Welsh (died 7 September 1992) was a prolific Argentine screenwriter.

Welsh wrote the scripts for almost 50 films between 1943 and 1987 including the script for the 1954 Román Viñoly Barreto film The Grandfather which starred actors such as Enrique Muino and Mecha Ortiz.

Welsh appeared as a member of the jury at the 16th Berlin International Film Festival in 1966.

== Selected filmography ==
- El Abuelo (1954)
- Dance of Fire (1949)
- Juan Mondiola (1950)
