= El Pibe Cabeza =

- Directed by: Leopoldo Torre Nilsson
- Release date: 1975
- Running time: 105 minute
- Country: Argentina
- Language: Spanish

El Pibe Cabeza is a 1975 Argentine crime drama film directed by Leopoldo Torre Nilsson.

== Cast ==
- Alfredo Alcón – Roberto Gordillo, El Pibe Cabeza
- Marta González – Julieta Dunne
- José Slavin – Caprioli
- Edgardo Suárez – el Nene Martínez
- Raúl Lavié – el Negro Mota
- Emilio Alfaro – Romano
- Silvia Montanari – El Pibe Cabeza's lover
- Ana Casares – Lucía
