= Martín Fierro (film) =

- Theatrical release poster
- Directed by: Leopoldo Torre Nilsson
- Screenplay by: Beatriz Guido; Luis Pico Estrada; Edmundo Eichelbaum; Héctor Grossi
- Story by: Leopoldo Torre Nilsson; Ulises Petit de Murat
- Based on: Martín Fierro by José Hernández
- Produced by: André Du Rona; Leopoldo Torre Nilsson
- Starring: Alfredo Alcón; Lautaro Murúa; Graciela Borges
- Cinematography: Aníbal Di Salvo
- Music by: Ariel Ramírez
- Production company: Contracuadro
- Release date: 1968
- Running time: 134 minutes
- Country: Argentina
- Language: Spanish

Martín Fierro is a 1968 film based upon José Hernández's poem Martín Fierro, widely considered Argentina's national poem. The story centers on the life of a renegade gaucho.

The film was directed by Leopoldo Torre Nilsson and featured Alfredo Alcón in the title role, Lautaro Murúa, Graciela Borges, Sergio Renán and Leonardo Favio. It won the Silver Condor Award for Best Picture.

== Summary ==
This story is taken from the 1872 poem written by Argentine poet Jose Hernandez. Martin (Alfredo Alcon) is a gaucho and a happily married family man who is drafted by the army. Sent to a remote outpost to fight Indians, he is relegated to working on the camp commandant's farm. After his tour of duty, Martin is held at gunpoint and forced to continue working the farm. He finally escapes, but returns home to find his family gone and his home destroyed. Drunk and dependent, he kills a black man in a fight and is forced to flee. When the deputy Craze (Altar Mural) sees how bravely Martin fights against the posse, he helps Martin kill off his adversaries. The two move out to an Indian camp where white men are accepted. They are content for many years until Martin leaves when his friend Craze dies. He returns to civilization and relocates his estranged sons before having a showdown with the brother of the man he killed.
