= The Old Young People =

1962 film

- Directed by: Rodolfo Kuhn
- Written by: Rodolfo Kuhn
- Starring: María Vaner
- Cinematography: Ricardo Aronovich
- Edited by: Gerardo Rinaldi; Antonio Ripoli; Antonio Ripoll
- Release date: 5 June 1962
- Running time: 106 minutes
- Country: Argentina
- Language: Spanish

The Old Young People (Spanish: Los jóvenes viejos, and also known as The Sad Young Men) is a 1962 Argentine film written and directed by Rodolfo Kuhn. The film won the Silver Condor Award for Best Film and was selected as the Argentine entry for the Best Foreign Language Film at the 35th Academy Awards, but was not accepted as a nominee.

== Cast ==
- María Vaner
- Alberto Argibay
- Marcela López Rey
- Jorge Rivera López
- Graciela Dufau
- Emilio Alfaro

== See also ==
- List of submissions to the 35th Academy Awards for Best Foreign Language Film
- List of Argentine submissions for the Academy Award for Best Foreign Language Film
