= El Familiar =

- Directed by: Octavio Getino
- Written by: Octavio Getino; Jorge Honig
- Release date: 9 October 1975
- Running time: 100 minutes
- Country: Argentina
- Language: Spanish

El Familiar is a 1975 Argentine film.

== Cast ==
- Martín Adjemián
- Emilio Alfaro
- Hugo Álvarez
- Octavio Getino
- Ricardo Gil Soria
- Carlos Lagos
- Morena Lynch
- Noemí Manzano
- Carlos Muñoz
- Víctor Proncet
