= Cacho Espíndola =

Argentine actor (1940–2004)

Cacho Espíndola (1940 – August 21, 2004) was an Argentine actor. He starred in the 1962 film Una Jaula no tiene secretos.

== Partial filmography ==
- Héroes de hoy (1960)
- Alias Gardelito (1961)
- Una jaula no tiene secretos (1962)
- Dar la cara (1962)
- La chacota (1962)
- Sombras en el cielo (1964)
- Chronicle of a Boy Alone (1965) – Physical Training
- Hotel alojamiento (1966)
- Las locas del conventillo (1966)
- Buenos Aires, verano 1912 (1966)
- Cuando los hombres hablan de mujeres (1967)
- Invasión (1969) – Dueño de motoneta (uncredited)
- Juan Lamaglia y señora (1970)
- Los mochileros (1970)
- La cosecha (1970)
- Balada para un mochilero (1971)
- Un guapo del 900 (1971)
- La gran ruta (1971) – Bebe
- Mi novia el... (1975) – Lince
- Los Chantas (1975) – Bicicleta
- Una mujer (1975)
- La película (1975)
- Juan que Ria (1976)
- Donde duermen dos... duermen tres (1979)
- So Feared a Hell (1980)
- La pulga en la oreja (1981)
- Noches sin lunas ni soles (1984) – Gato Félix
- Tacos altos (1985) – Julián
- Las lobas (1986)
- Johnny Tolengo, el majestuoso (1987)
- El amateur (1999) – Intendente
- Tobi y el libro mágico (2001) – El abuelo
- El fondo del mar (2003) – police officer (voice)
- India pravile (2003) – (final film role)
