= Chronicle of a Boy Alone =

1965 film

Crónica de un niño solo
- Directed by: Leonardo Favio
- Written by: Leonardo Favio; Zuhair Jury
- Produced by: Luis DeStefano
- Starring: Diego Puente
- Cinematography: Ignacio Souto
- Edited by: Gerardo Rinaldi; Antonio Ripoll
- Release date: 5 May 1965
- Running time: 79 minutes
- Country: Argentina
- Language: Spanish

Chronicle of a Boy Alone (Spanish: Crónica de un niño solo), also known as Chronicle of a Lonely Child, is a 1965 Argentine film directed by Leonardo Favio. It won the Silver Condor Award for Best Film.

It was selected as the greatest Argentine film of all time in a poll conducted by the Museo del Cine Pablo Ducrós Hicken in 2000. In a new version of the survey organized in 2022 by the specialized magazines La vida util, Taipei and La tierra quema, presented at the Mar del Plata International Film Festival, the film reached the 5 position.

== Plot ==
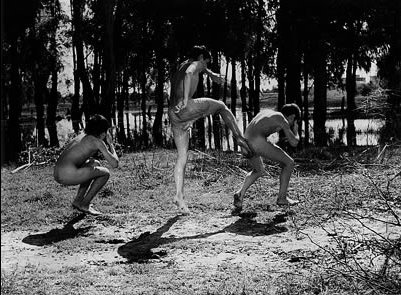
A scene from the film

Polin is an eleven-year-old troublemaker in reform school for unknown reasons. After suffering from harsh treatment at the hands of the staff there, Polin finally reaches a breaking point and snaps, punching one of the supervisors in the face. He is then sent to the police station where he is locked up in a cell and left alone. Polin soon breaks out and travels back to his hometown, a rural fishing village, where he meets up with his best friend and falls back into his old routine—smoking, pickpocketing, shoplifting, skinny dipping with his friends and picking fights with the neighborhood bullies—all the while trying to avoid a run-in with the law, which he knows is inevitable.

== Cast ==
- Diego Puente as Polín
- Tino Pascali as Justice Officer
- Óscar Espíndola as Physical Trainer
- Victoriano Moreira as Fiori
- Beto Gianola as Police Officer
- Leonardo Favio as Fabián
- María Vaner as The Girl

== Controversy ==
While on the surface a film about children, at the time of its release in 1965 the film was viewed by many as a critique on Argentina's regime. In addition to this, the film's brutal and realistic depiction of Argentina's state-run orphanages at the time caused a great deal of controversy.

The film also contains a controversial scene containing extensive, explicit nudity involving several young Argentine boys skinny dipping.
