= Cinemateca Argentina =

Film archive in Buenos Aires, Argentina

Cinemateca Argentina is a film archive located in Buenos Aires, Argentina. It was established in 1949. It holds more than 22,000 films, 80,000 photographs and a library.

== See also ==
- List of film archives
- Cinema of Argentina
