= Aniceto =

Aniceto is a 2008 Argentine musical drama film directed by Leonardo Favio and starring Hernán Piquín. The film is a remake of El romance del Aniceto y la Francisca, a 1967 drama film also directed by Favio. Both films are based on the short story El cenizo ("The Pigweed") by Zuhair Jury.

It was Favio's last film. It won several Silver Condor Awards, including Best Film and Best Director.
