= Alfredo Alcón =

Argentine theatre and film actor

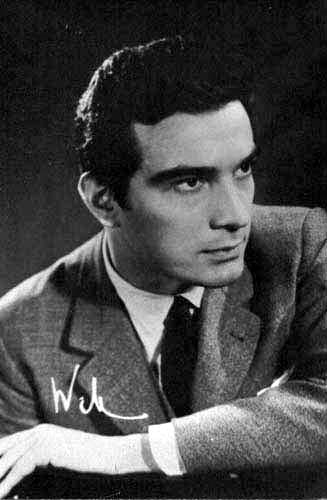
- Born: Alfredo Félix Alcón Riesco; 3 March 1930; Buenos Aires, Argentina
- Died: 11 April 2014 (aged 84); Buenos Aires, Argentina
- Occupation: Actor
- Years active: 1955–2014

Alfredo Félix Alcón (Spanish pronunciation: [alˈfɾeðo alˈkon]; 3 March 1930 – 11 April 2014) was an Argentine theatre and film actor born in Buenos Aires. Widely regarded as one of the best and most important Argentine actors of the 20th century.

He worked in more than 50 movies since his first one, El amor nunca muere (Love Never Dies), in 1955, and received many recognitions for his work: among others, the Silver Condor, the Martin Fierro Award and the 1981 Diamond Konex Award.

He died on April 11, 2014, at the age of 84.

== Biography ==
Alfredo Alcón was born on March 3, 1930, in Liniers. His family has Spanish ancestry: his paternal grandmother immigrated from Cádiz, and his mother from Castile. As a result, he had a fluent Spanish accent, which helped him when he worked in Spain. His father died soon after his birth, and so the family moved to Ciudadela, Buenos Aires. One of his early influences was Richard III by William Shakespeare, which he read at the age of 11.

He began working as a radio host, announcing news from the Liniers market (the main market of livestock in Argentina). His first famous film was the 1955 Love Never Dies, starred by Mirtha Legrand. The film was directed by Luis César Amadori. The success of the film made them work again as lead actors in La Pícara soñadora, directed by Ernesto Arancibia, and Con gusto a rabia, directed by Fernando Ayala.

He made his most successful films with the director Leopoldo Torre Nilsson. Un guapo del 900 (1960) was followed by three historical films: Martín Fierro (based in the poem Martín Fierro) in 1968, El Santo de la Espada in 1970 (based in the life of José de San Martín), and Güemes: la tierra en armas in 1971 (based in the life of Martín Miguel de Güemes). They also filmed La Mafia in 1972, The Seven Madmen in 1973, Boquitas pintadas in 1974 and El Pibe Cabeza in 1975.

He has worked in theater as well, both as actor and director. Some of his plays were directed by Margarita Xirgu, Carlos Gandolfo and Omar Grasso, and he directed the plays Los caminos de Federico, Bocca-Alcón, Homenaje Ibsen, ¡Shakespeare todavía! and Final de partida. He played Hamlet during the Dirty War, amid concerns for its potential political connotations.

His last work in television was a cameo in Herederos de una venganza (2011), as the leader of a masonic lodge. He had worked before in Por el nombre de Dios and Vulnerables (both from 1999). He also worked in the play Los reyes de la risa with Guillermo Francella.

Alcón was hospitalized on November 28, 2013. He did not recover, and died on April 11, 2014, of respiratory failure. He was mourned at the Argentine National Congress, and the coffin was taken to La Chacarita Cemetery, with a brief stop at the Teatro General San Martín.

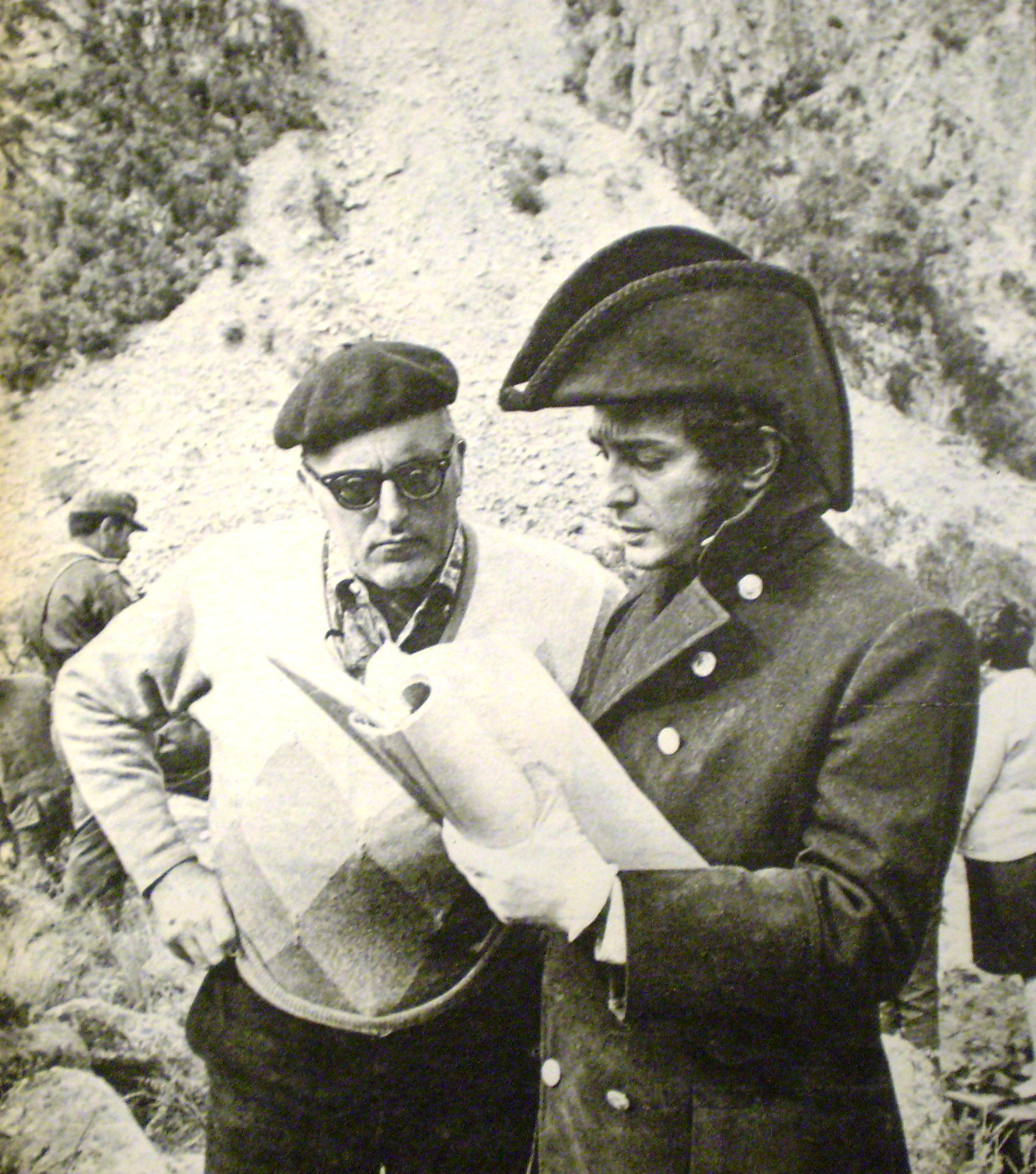
El Santo de la Espada, 1970

== Selected filmography ==
- Love Never Dies (1955)
- Sugar Harvest (1958)
- The Candidate (1959)
- Summer Skin (1961)
- The Innocents (1963)
- Martín Fierro (1968)
- El Santo de la Espada (1970)
- The Seven Madmen (1973)
- Nazareno Cruz and the Wolf (1975)
- What's Autumn? (1977)
- Son of the Bride (2001)
- In the City Without Limits (2002)
