= The 100 Greatest Films of Argentine Cinema =

List of the greatest films of Argentine cinema

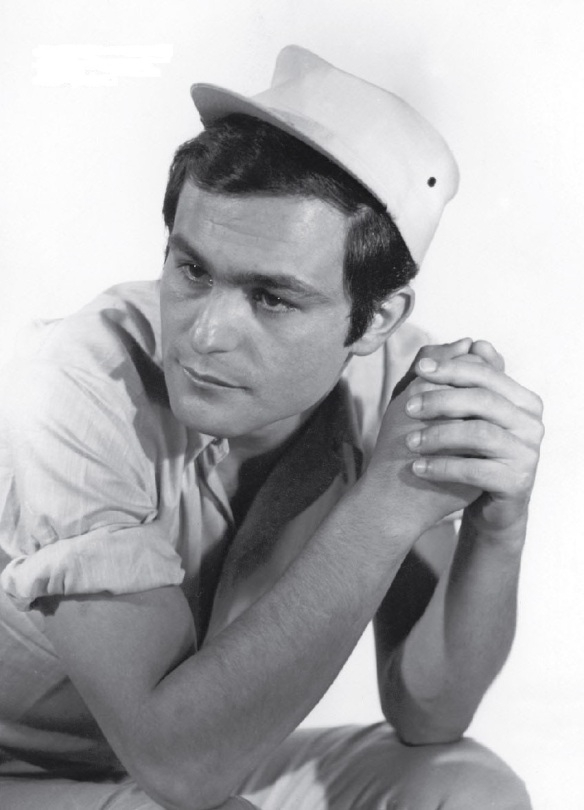
In the 2022 list, Leonardo Favio was the director with the greatest presence among the top 100 films, with eight titles.

The 100 Greatest Films of Argentine Cinema (Spanish: Las 100 mejores películas del cine argentino), also known as the Survey of Argentine cinema (Spanish: Encuesta de cine argentino), are a series of opinion polls carried out to establish a list of the greatest films of Argentine cinema of all time. The original survey was carried out by the Museo del Cine Pablo Ducrós Hicken in the years 1977, 1984, 1991 and 2000. In 2022, a new edition was held, organized by the film magazines La vida útil, Taipei and La tierra quema, with support from INCAA, the Mar del Plata International Film Festival, the FestiFreak International Film Festival of La Plata, the Casa de la Cultura of General Roca and the Museo del Cine Pablo Ducrós Hicken.

In the 1977 and 1984 lists, Prisioneros de la tierra (1939) by Mario Soffici reached first place, while Crónica de un niño solo (1965) by Leonardo Favio was the most voted in 2000. In the 2022 survey, the first place went to La Ciénaga (2001) by Lucrecia Martel by a wide margin. The 2022 list generated debate regarding the need for a national Cinematheque (a longtime demand of the local film community), since the difficult or non-existent access to many works from the past, like the classical era of Argentine cinema, greatly affected the result.

== Surveys by the Museo del Cine Pablo Ducrós Hicken ==
The original surveys were carried out by the Museo del Cine Pablo Ducrós Hicken in Buenos Aires in the years 1977, 1984, 1991 and 2000. The results of the last survey were published in the 4th issue of La mirada cautiva, the museum's magazine, which also included the top ten from the 1977 and 1984 polls.

== Survey of 2022 ==
=== Development ===
In 2022, the film magazines La vida útil, Taipei and La tierra quema decided to carry out a new survey inspired by the previous ones. In the editorial accompanying the list, they stated: "When members of our magazines found out about their existence, almost simultaneously and through different channels, we immediately thought it would be a good idea to carry out a new version of the survey." The project was carried out with the support of INCAA, the Mar del Plata International Film Festival, the FestiFreak International Film Festival of La Plata, the Casa de la Cultura of General Roca and the Museo del Cine Pablo Ducrós Hicken.

Various critics, journalists, researchers, historians, programmers, collectors, directors, screenwriters, producers, actors, cinematographers, editors and sound engineers, among other film-related jobs, participated in the 2022 survey. More than 1,000 invitations were sent, of which 546 responses were obtained, including 812 different titles; each participant chose their 10 favorite Argentine films, of any year and length, with all of them having the same value at the time of counting. Due to the coincidences in the number of votes, 62 ranking positions were formed, and the "Top 100" actually consists of 103 films divided into 52 positions.

The results of the Encuesta de cine argentino 2022 (English: "2022 Survey of Argentine cinema") were presented at the 37th Mar del Plata International Film Festival on 11 November 2022. During the presentation of the list, Paula Félix-Didier, director of the Museo del Cine Pablo Ducrós Hicken, declared that the "survey has the specific and explicit idea of developing a canon of Argentine cinema and serves to discuss, open doors and draw attention about some things." The first place went to La Ciénaga (2001) by Lucrecia Martel by a wide margin.

== Results ==
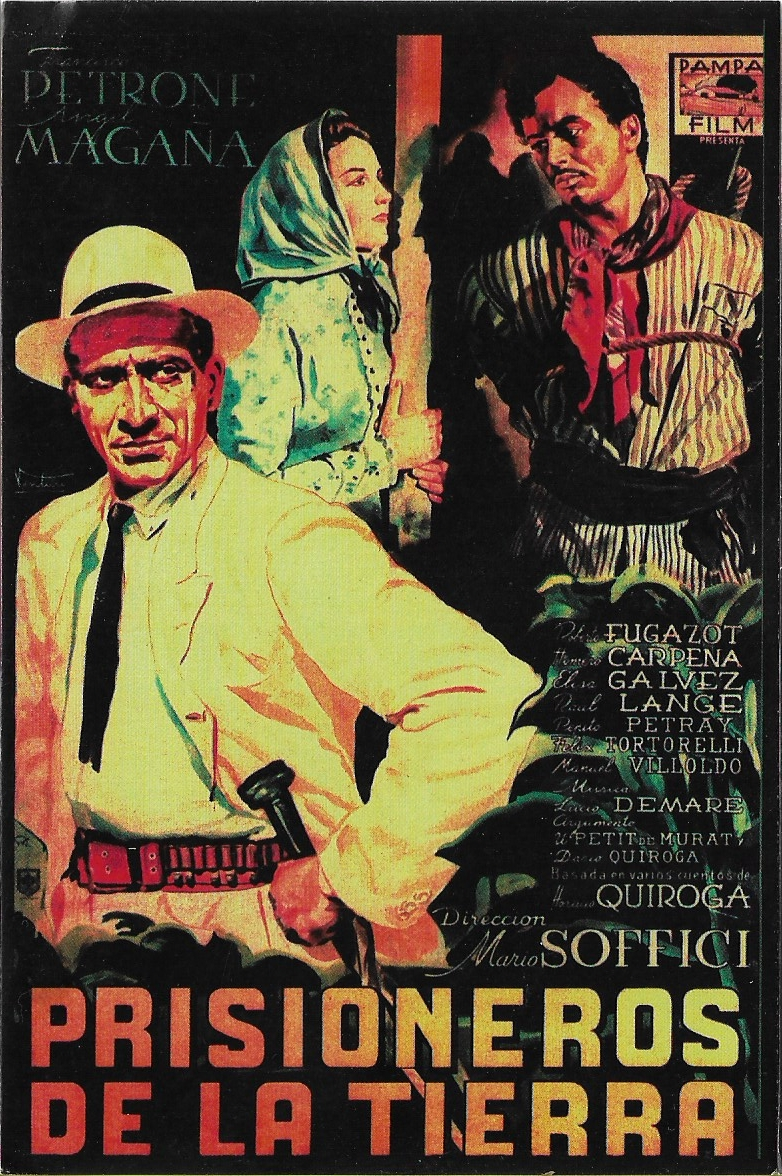
Prisioneros de la tierra (1939) by Mario Soffici was chosen as the best Argentine film of all time in the 1977 and 1984 polls.

The top 10 positions in the 1977 and 1984 polls, as well as the top 100 in the 2000 poll, were published in 4th issue of La mirada cautiva, the magazine of the Museo del Cine Pablo Ducrós Hicken.

=== Top 10 of 1977 ===
Pos.	Title	Director	Year
1	Prisioneros de la tierra	Mario Soffici	1939
2	La casa del ángel	Leopoldo Torre Nilsson	1957
3	La guerra gaucha	Lucas Demare	1942
4	Así es la vida	Francisco Mugica	1939
5	La vuelta al nido	Leopoldo Torres Ríos	1938
6	Las aguas bajan turbias	Hugo del Carril	1952
7	El jefe	Fernando Ayala	1958
8	La dama duende	Luis Saslavsky	1945
9	Malambo	Alberto de Zavalía	1942
10	Fuera de la ley	Manuel Romero	1937

=== Top 10 of 1984 ===
Pos.	Title	Director	Year
1	Prisioneros de la tierra	Mario Soffici	1939
2	La Patagonia rebelde	Héctor Olivera	1974
3	La guerra gaucha	Lucas Demare	1942
4	Las aguas bajan turbias	Hugo del Carril	1952
5	Tiempo de revancha	Adolfo Aristarain	1981
6	La casa del ángel	Leopoldo Torre Nilsson	1957
7	Los isleros	Lucas Demare	1951
8	La tregua	Sergio Renán	1974
9	Este es el romance del Aniceto y la Francisca, de cómo quedó trunco, comenzó la tristeza y unas pocas cosas más...	Leonardo Favio	1967
10	El jefe	Fernando Ayala	1958

=== Top 100 of 2000 ===
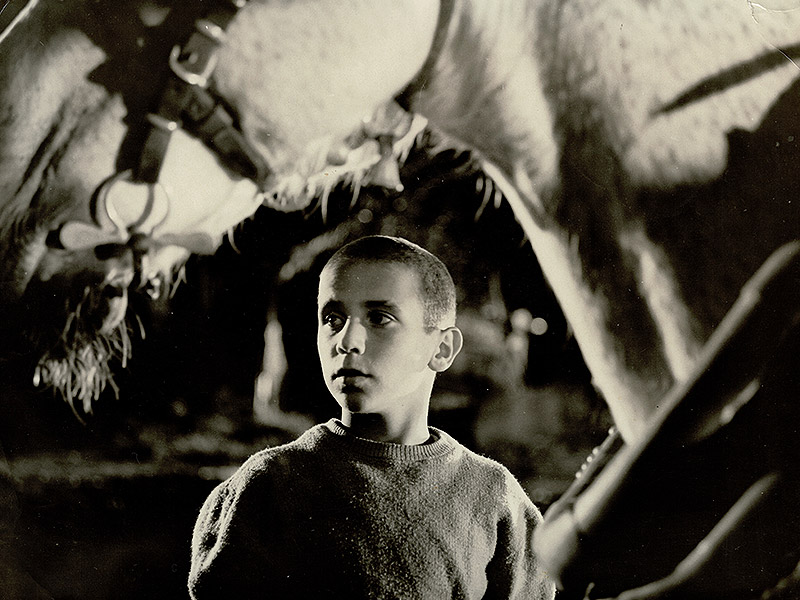
Crónica de un niño solo (1965) by Leonardo Favio was chosen as the best Argentine film of all time in the 2000 survey.

Due to the coincidences in the number of votes, the list of the 100 greatest films actually consists of 101 films divided into 43 positions.

Pos.	Title	Director	Year	Votes
1	Crónica de un niño solo	Leonardo Favio	1965	76
2	Camila	María Luisa Bemberg	1984	75
3	Las aguas bajan turbias	Hugo del Carril	1952	72
3	La Patagonia rebelde	Héctor Olivera	1974	72
4	Rosaura a las diez	Mario Soffici	1958	68
5	Este es el romance del Aniceto y la Francisca, de cómo quedó trunco, comenzó la tristeza y unas pocas cosas más...	Leonardo Favio	1967	67
6	Prisioneros de la tierra	Mario Soffici	1939	66
6	La tregua	Sergio Renán	1974	66
7	La guerra gaucha	Lucas Demare	1942	65
8	La historia oficial	Luis Puenzo	1985	63
9	Juan Moreira	Leonardo Favio	1973	62
9	Mundo grúa	Pablo Trapero	1999	62
9	Tiempo de revancha	Adolfo Aristarain	1981	62
10	La casa del ángel	Leopoldo Torre Nilsson	1957	61
10	Apenas un delincuente	Hugo Fregonese	1949	61
10	Hombre mirando al sudeste	Eliseo Subiela	1986	61
10	Pizza, birra, faso	Bruno Stagnaro e Israel Adrián Caetano	1998	61

=== Top 100 of 2022 ===
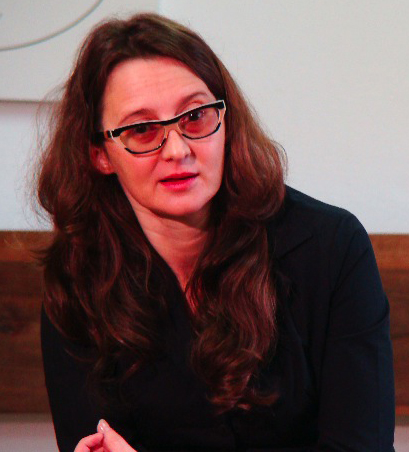
In the 2022 list, La Ciénaga (2001) by Lucrecia Martel (pictured) was the most voted film by a wide margin, and all her films appear in the Top 100.

Due to the coincidences in the number of votes, the "Top 100" of the Encuesta de cine argentino 2022 actually consists of 103 films divided into 52 positions. The total list has 812 titles and 62 ranking positions, belonging to the latter all the titles that had only one vote.

Pos.	Title	Director	Year	Votes
1	La Ciénaga	Lucrecia Martel	2001	224
2	Invasión	Hugo Santiago Muchnik	1969	136
3	Tiempo de revancha	Adolfo Aristarain	1981	124
4	El dependiente	Leonardo Favio	1969	108
5	Crónica de un niño solo	Leonardo Favio	1965	100
6	La hora de los hornos	Fernando "Pino" Solanas and Octavio Getino	1968	99
7	Juan, como si nada hubiera sucedido	Carlos Echeverría	1987	96
8	Pizza, birra, faso	Bruno Stagnaro and Israel Adrián Caetano	1998	88
9	Silvia Prieto	Martín Rejtman	1999	86
10	Nueve reinas	Fabián Bielinsky	2000	80

== See also ==
- Latin American cinema
- List of films considered the best
