= Octavio Getino =

Argentine film director and writer (1935–2012)

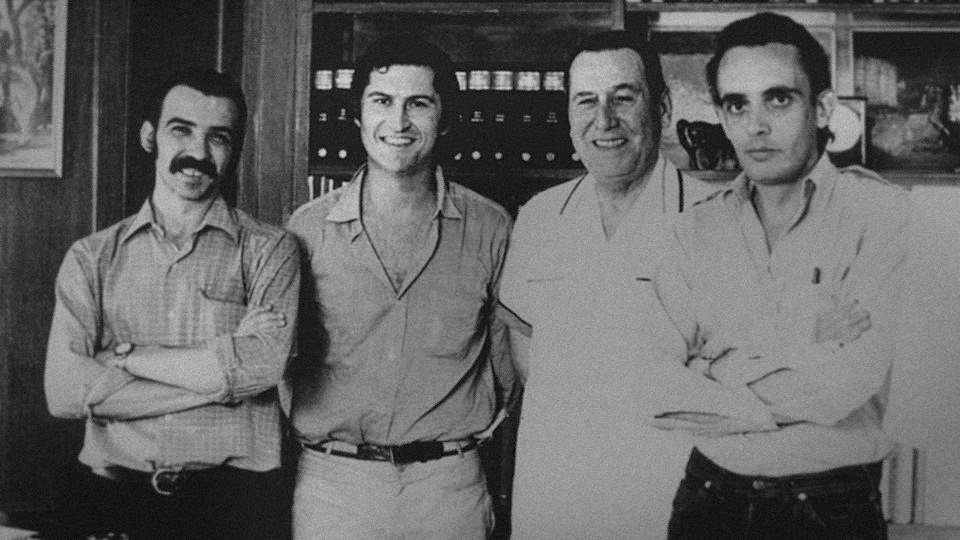
The directors Gerardo Vallejo, Fernando Solanas and Octavio Getino together with Juan Domingo Perón (1971).

Octavio Getino (August 6, 1935 in León, Spain – October 1, 2012 in Buenos Aires, Argentina) was an Argentine film director and writer who is best known for co-founding, along with Fernando Solanas, the Grupo Cine Liberación and the school of Third Cinema.

Getino was born in Spain and migrated to Argentina in the 1950s.

In 1964 he was awarded the Premio Casa de las Américas for his short-stories book Chulleca. Getino also left a number of essays on cinema and sociology.

From 1989 to 1990, Getino led the Instituto Nacional de Cinematografía (INCAA).

He died of cancer at 77, on October 1, 2012.

== Filmography ==
- The Hour of the Furnaces (Hora de los hornos, 1968)
- Argentina, mayo de 1969: Los caminos de la liberación (1969)
- Perón: La revolución justicialista (1971)
- Perón: Actualización política y doctrinaria para la toma del poder (1971)
- El Familiar (1975)

== Works as writer ==
- Chulleca (short stories, Casa de las Américas, La Habana, 1963)
- A diez años de "Hacia un tercer cine" (Filmoteca UNAM, 1982)
- Notas sobre cine argentino y latinoamericano (Edimedios, 1984)
- Perú (CIMCA, 1985)
- Cine latinoamericano (Editorial Legasa, 1988)
- Cine y dependencia (Puntosur Editores, 1990)
- Turismo y Desarrollo en América Latina (Limusa, 1994)
- Las industrias culturales en la Argentina (Ediciones Colihue, 1995)
- La Tercera mirada (Paidós, 1996)
- Cine argentino (Fundación CICCUS, 1998)
- Cine y televisión en América Latina (Ediciones CICCUS, 1999)
- El cine de "las historias de la revolución" (Grupo Editor Altamira, 2002)
- Turismo entre el ocio y el neg-ocio (Ediciones CICCUS, La Crujía, 2002)

== See also ==
- Cinema of Argentina
