= María Vaner =

Spanish actress

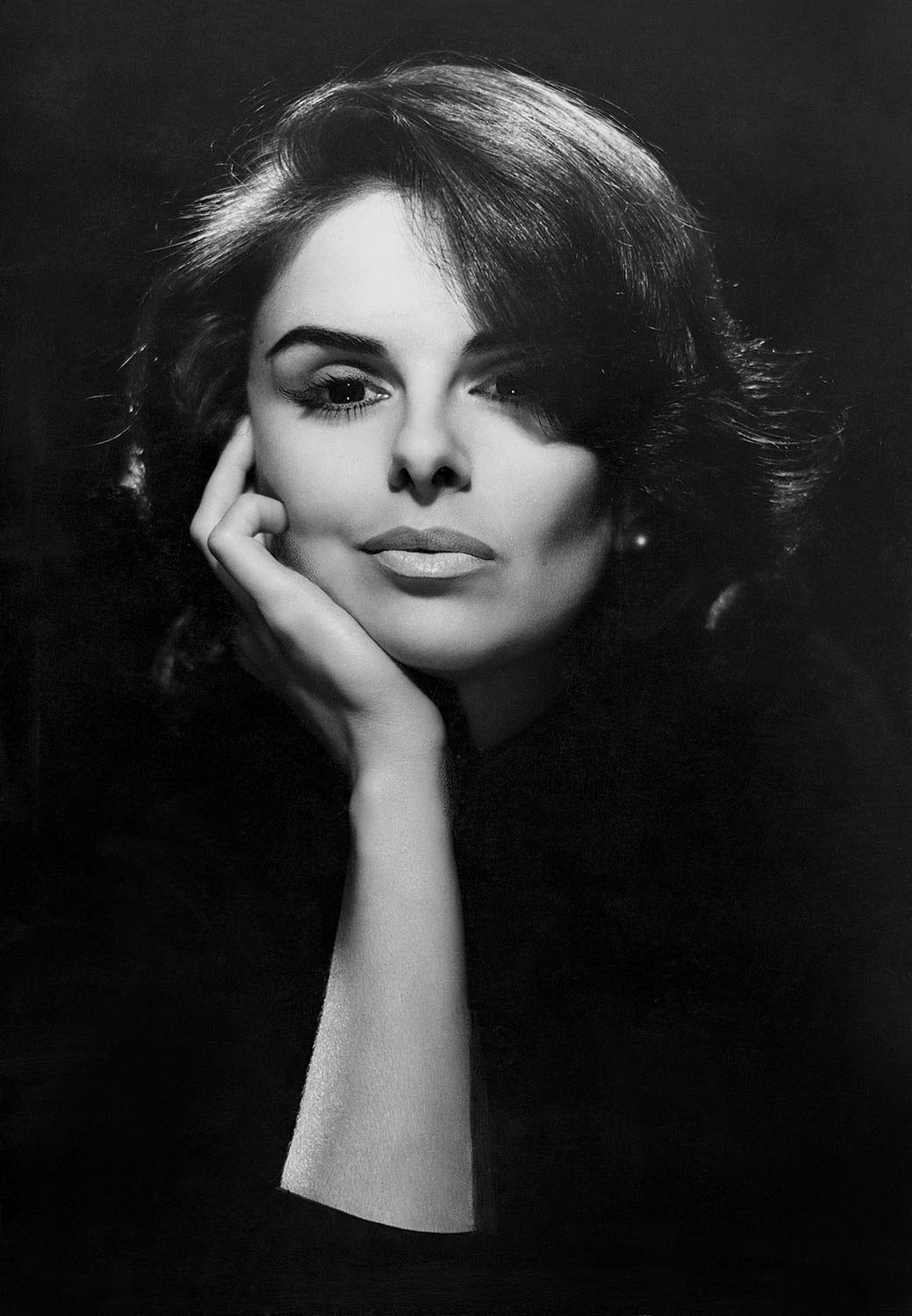
- Photograph by Annemarie Heinrich in 1959
- Born: María Aleandro Robledo; 23 March 1935; Madrid, Spain
- Died: 21 July 2008 (aged 73); Buenos Aires, Argentina
- Occupation: Actress
- Years active: 1958–2008

María Vaner (23 March 1935 – 21 July 2008) was a Spanish actress. She appeared in nearly 50 films and television shows between 1958 and 2008. The daughter of Pedro Aleandro, her sister was actress Norma Aleandro. She had two sons with Argentine singer Leonardo Favio.

== Selected filmography ==
- The Kidnapper (1958)
- The Old Young People (1962)
- Me First (1964)
- Chronicle of a Boy Alone (1965)
- El Caradura y la millonaria (1971)
- The Bad Life (1973)
- La Raulito (1975)
- Kargus (1981)
- Adiós, Roberto (1985)
