= Leonardo Favio =

Argentine singer, actor and filmmaker (1938–2012)

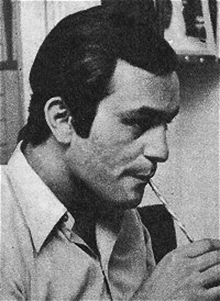
- Favio in 1968

Background information
- Also known as: El Juglar de América (The Troubadour of the Americas); La voz del pueblo (The Voice of the People)
- Born: Fuad Jorge Jury; 28 May 1938; Luján de Cuyo, Mendoza, Argentina
- Died: 5 November 2012 (aged 74) Buenos Aires, Argentina
- Genres: As a filmmaker: Drama; historical; biopic; fantasy; musical; focumentary; As a singer: Pop music; latin ballad
- Occupations: Singer; actor; screenwriter; filmmaker
- Years active: 1958–2012

Fuad Jorge Jury (28 May 1938 – 5 November 2012), better known by his stage name Leonardo Favio (Spanish pronunciation: [leoˈnaɾðo ˈfaβjo]), was an Argentine singer, actor and filmmaker. He is considered one of Argentina's best film directors and one of the country's most enduring cultural figures, as well as a popular singer-songwriter throughout Latin America.

Much beloved in Latin America, Favio was one of the most successful Argentine singers in the 1960s and 1970s, with big hits like "Ding, dong, estas cosas del amor" (with Carola Leyton), "O quizás simplemente le regale una rosa", "Fuiste mía un verano", "Ella ya me olvidó", "Quiero aprender de memoria", "Mí tristeza es mía y nada más", "Para saber cómo es la soledad", "Mi amante niña mi compañera", "Ni el clavel ni la rosa", "La foto de carnet", "No jueges más", "Chiquillada" and "La cita". He also starred in many films before establishing himself as a director.

At the time he began his singing career (mid-1960s), Favio was already an established film director. His first feature movie – Chronicle of a Boy Alone – and the second one – El Romance del Aniceto y la Francisca – are considered to be some of the best Argentine movies of all times. He continued writing and directing, releasing the now-classic films El dependiente (1969), Juan Moreira (1973) and Nazareno Cruz y el Lobo (1975), which remains the highest-grossing Argentine film in country's history. In 1976, he released the comedy-drama Soñar, soñar, with Gian Franco Pagliaro and Carlos Monzón, which had a mixed critical reception at the time of its release; it is currently considered a cult film. That same year, right after the beginning of the Argentina's last civil-military dictatorship (1976–1983), Favio was forced to go into exile to save his life from the State-sponsored terrorism which prevailed in the country. He returned to Argentina after democracy was reestablished during the 1980s onwards, later breaking a 17-year gap without filming when he released the successful biopic Gatica, el mono, before embarking in the making of his colossal six-hours' documentary Perón, sinfonía del sentimiento. Favio's last film was Aniceto (2008), a musical remake of El romance del Aniceto y la Francisca, refashioned as a ballet-inspired drama.

== Biography ==
Favio was born Fuad Jorge Jury, the son of Syrian-Lebanese Jorge Jury Atrach. His brother is writer and director Jorge Zuhair Jury. Favio was married to actress María Vaner, with whom he had two children, one being the composer Nico Jury.

On 9 October 2010, Favio was appointed Argentina's Ambassador of Culture by national decree of president Cristina Fernández de Kirchner. He died on 5 November 2012 in Buenos Aires, at the age of 74.

== Works ==
=== Discography ===
- Me miró, LP
- Aquí está, LP
- Yo soy, LP
- De amor nadie muere, LP
- Una cita con Leonardo Favio, LP
- Leonardo Favio, LP
- Favio 73, LP
- Hola Che, LP
- Favio, LP in Spain
- Vamos a Puerto Rico, LP
- En Concierto, LP
- Era... cómo podría explicar, LP
- En Concierto, LP
- Leonardo Favio, LP (1969)
- Fuíste mía un verano, LP (1968)
- No jueges más, LP
- Más Que Un Loco, LP (1989)

=== Filmography ===
==== Director ====
- Aniceto (2008)
- Perón, sinfonía del sentimiento (1999)
- Gatica, el mono (1993)
- Soñar, soñar (1976)
- Nazareno Cruz y el Lobo (1975)
- Juan Moreira (1973)
- El dependiente (1969)
- Éste es el romance del Aniceto y la Francisca, de cómo quedó trunco, comenzó la tristeza y unas pocas cosas más.. (1966)
- Crónica de un niño solo (1965)
- El amigo (1960)
- El señor Fernández (1958; unfinished)

==== Actor ====
- Tobi y el libro mágico (2000)
- Campo de sangre (1999)
- Gatica, "El Mono" (1993)
- Simplemente una rosa (1971)
- Fuiste mía un verano (1969)
- El dependiente (1969)
- Martín Fierro (1968)
- El ojo de tu madre (1966)
- Crónica de un niño solo (1965)
- Paula cautiva (1963)
- La terraza (1963)
- La Mano en la trampa (1961)
- Fin de fiesta (1960)
- En la ardiente oscuridad (1958)
- El ángel de España (1958)
- The Kidnapper (1958)
- El jefe (1958)
- El Ángel de España (1958; de extra)

==== As producer ====
- Gatica "el Mono" (1993)
- Nazareno Cruz y el Lobo (1975)
