= Rodolfo Kuhn =

- Born: 29 December 1934; Buenos Aires, Argentina
- Died: 3 January 1987 (aged 52); Mexico
- Occupations: Film director Screenwriter; Film producer

Rodolfo Kuhn (29 December 1934 – 3 January 1987) was an Argentine film director, screen writer and producer.

Kuhn was born in Buenos Aires.

He directed and wrote the script to the 1967 popular Brazilian film, El ABC del amor with Eduardo Coutinho near the beginning of his career. The film was entered into the 17th Berlin International Film Festival.

Kuhn was head of the jury at the 24th Berlin International Film Festival in 1974.

He died in Mexico.

== Selected filmography ==
- The Old Young People (1962)
- Los Inconstantes (1963)
- Pajarito Gómez (1965)
- Viaje de una noche de verano (1965)
- El ABC del amor (1967)
- Ufa con el sexo (1968)
