= Museo del Cine Pablo Ducrós Hicken =

Film museum and archive in Argentina

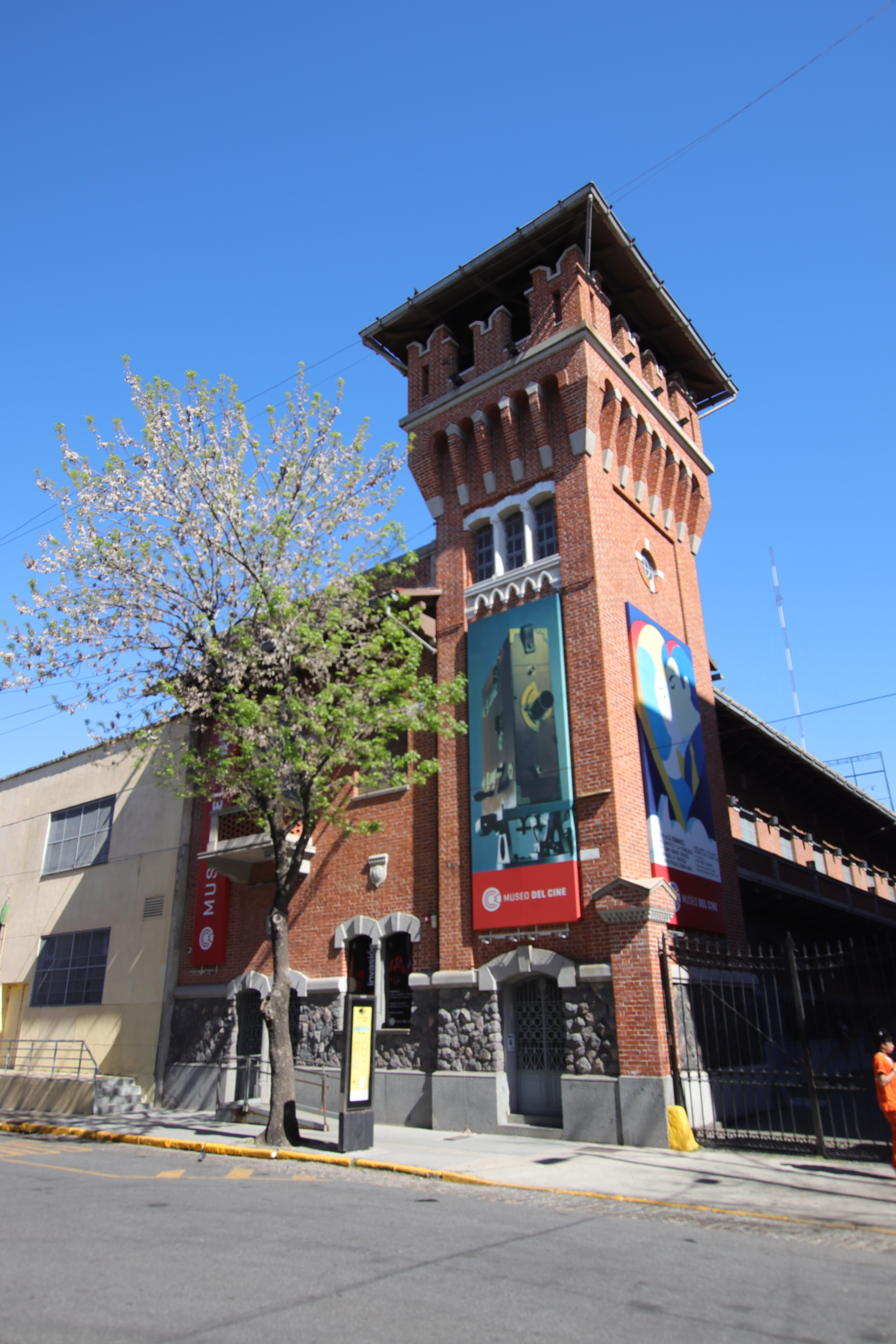
- The museum in 2019
- Established: October 1, 1971; 54 years ago
- Location: Buenos Aires, Argentina
- Coordinates: 34°37′47″S 58°21′26″W

The Film Museum Pablo Ducrós Hicken (Spanish: Museo del Cine Pablo Ducrós Hicken), is a museum dedicated to Argentine cinema located in Buenos Aires, Argentina. Established in 1971, the museum preserves and exhibits the history of the country's film industry through an extensive collection that includes approximately 90,000 film reels, along with photographs, posters, scripts, costumes, and cinematic equipment.

== History ==
The Cinema Museum of the City of Buenos Aires was created on October 1, 1971, from the film collection donated by the widow of researcher and collector Pablo C. Ducrós Hicken. In its founding act, it defines the central objectives that remain to this day: to exhibit and preserve the objects that are part of its heritage and to increase the collection dedicated to Argentine cinema. In this way, the elements that the Museum of Cinema preserves are not only films, but also cameras, projectors, moviolas and other elements of cinematographic technique, which were added -from their beginnings- to pieces of costumes and sets, models, props, scripts, filming plans, production reports, newsletters, photographs, advertisements and reviews.

The first director of the museum was the critic and researcher Jorge Miguel Couselo, who was succeeded during the Military Coup by the critic Rolando Fustiñana (Roland), founder of the Cinemateca Argentina. Once the democratic order was restored, other directors were the critic and filmmaker Guillermo Fernández Jurado, the critic and researcher José María Poirier Lalanne and the documentary maker David Blaustein. Since 2008, its director is the researcher and specialist in audiovisual preservation Paula Félix-Didier.

The museum previously operated in six places: Teatro General San Martín, the former Di Tella Institute, the Centro Cultural Recoleta, the Sarmiento building at 2500, Defensa street 1220, the old textile company Piccaluga building at Feijóo 525, that on August 1, 2011, the historic building of La Boca neighborhood in Caffarena 51, part of the former Compañia Electrica Italo Argentina built in 1916, arrived at its current location. To this headquarters was added a few blocks, in 2013, another administrative technical headquarters -in Minister Brin 615-, which contains the deposits of film material and archive in general as well as the technical areas of film, conservation and cataloging of scripts and photographs .

== Heritage ==
Since its foundation, under Ministry of Culture of the City of Buenos Aires, has been carrying out an important task of rescue, preservation, research and dissemination of the Argentine audiovisual heritage.

Among other activities, the museum organizes and projects film cycles and exhibitions; carries out projects destined to the enrichment and diffusion of the Argentine cinematographic culture; performs exchange programs with archives and museums in different countries; offers courses and workshops and provides support for research and teaching.

The museum develops its activities in two venues, both located in the neighborhood of La Boca:

The headquarters-exhibition of Caffarena 51 is located in a historic building in La Boca, part of the former power plant of the Italo Argentina Electricity Company built in 1916. The renovated headquarters has an auditorium with capacity for 70 people and a cabin equipped for analogue and digital projection and will include among its programming the material of the film archive of the museum. This space incorporates an educational area for workshops and seminars and the new permanent exhibition «Dream, dream».

Located in Ministro Brin street 615, its archive-site contains a library and a video library open to the public, a film library that holds more than 90 thousand rolls of film in various formats and supports, several collections such as the 400 teams, mostly cameras and projectors, more than three thousand original posters of Argentine films, 360 sketches of scenery and costumes and 400 pieces of costumes used in Argentine films, along with around 60 thousand photographs of films and personalities of our cinema.

The museum, dedicated to preserving and disseminating Argentine cinema past and present, seeks to be an open space for research, education and artistic production.

== See also ==
- List of film archives
- Cinema of Latin America
- Golden Age of Argentine cinema
