= Pampa Film =

- Industry: Film production
- Founded: January 1937
- Headquarters: Argentina

Pampa Film was an Argentine film production company that was active during the Golden Age of Argentine cinema in the 1930s and 1940s. It is known for its classic Prisioneros de la tierra (1939).

== History ==
Pampa Film was founded in January 1937 by Warner Bros. in partnership with the local entrepreneur Olegario Ferrando. The company used the Lumiton facilities at first, and Lumiton was to distribute its films. Later the link with Lumiton was severed.

Luis Saslavsky directed Sueño de Una Vide Nueva for Pampa Film, released in Argentina as La fuga by Warner Bros. on 28 July 1937 with music by César Gola. It was one of the hits of the year. Jorge Luis Borges praised the romantic comedy, saying it did not "suffer from fruitless images" but flowed "the way American films do." In La fuga Amelia Bence supported Tita Merello and Santiago Arrieta. Her performance earned Bence a contract at Pampa Film and three other film appearances.

On 17 August 1939 Pampa Film released Prisioneros de la tierra, directed by Mario Soffici and starring Ángel Magaña, Francisco Petrone, Eliza Gálvez, Raúl Lange, Homero Cárpena and Roberto Fugazot. The film, based on short stories by Horacio Quiroga, has become a classic. The Argentine film historian Domingo di Núbila has called the genre launched by this film "social folkloric". It inspired many later filmmakers in Argentina, although in the short term the industry did not take up the challenge.

== Filmography ==
- La fuga 1937
- Los caranchos de la Florida 1938
- Nativa 1939
- ...Y los sueños pasan 1939
- Prisioneros de la tierra 1939
- Encadenado 1940
- La carga de los valientes (Only the Valiant) 1940
- Chingolo 1940
- La quinta calumnia 1941
- El mozo número 13 1941
- El cura gaucho (The Gaucho Priest) 1941
- Yo quiero morir contigo (I Want to Die with You) 1941
- Stella 1943
- Oro en la mano (Gold in the Hand) 1943
- Siete mujeres 1944
- La Casta Susana 1944
- Villa rica del Espíritu Santo 1945
- The Abyss Opens (1945)
- Lauracha 1946
- Chiruca 1948

== Sources ==
- Barnard, Timothy; Rist, Peter (2013-08-21). South American Cinema: A Critical Filmography, 1915-1994. Routledge. ISBN 978-1-136-54548-1.
- Bence, Amelia; Etchelet, Raúl (2011). La niña del umbral: Amelia Bence: memorias (in Spanish). Buenos Aires, Argentina: Corregidor. ISBN 978-9-500-51934-2.
- Finkielman, Jorge (2003-12-24). The Film Industry in Argentina: An Illustrated Cultural History. McFarland. ISBN 978-0-7864-1628-8.
- Waldman, Harry (1994-01-01). Beyond Hollywood's Grasp: American Filmmakers Abroad, 1914-1945. Scarecrow Press. ISBN 978-0-8108-2841-4.
