= Ralph Pappier =

Ralph Pappier (16 January 1914 in Shanghai – 17 August 1998 in Buenos Aires) was an Argentine production designer, set decorator and film director.

== Career ==
Pappier was most prolific in Argentine cinema in the 1940s, and contributed to a range of acclaimed films during the period. He was production designer for the Silver Condor Award for Best Film award-winning The Gaucho War (1942) and Best Cinematography winner Three Men of the River (1943), and director of the Silver Condor for Best Film winning films School of Champions (1950) and Caballito criollo (1953). He was also cinematographer for the 1945 film Circus cavalcade. The Argentine Academy of Cinematography Arts and Sciences gave him awards for Best Scenography for En el viejo Buenos Aires (1942) and Su mejor alumno (1944).

== Filmography ==
=== Director ===
- Esquiú, una luz en el sendero (1965)
- Allá donde el viento brama (inédita - 1963)
- Operación "G" (1962)
- Delito (1962)
- El festín de Satanás (1955)
- La morocha (1955)
- Caballito criollo (1953)
- Escuela de campeones (1950)
- El último payador (1950)
- My Poor Beloved Mother (1948)

=== Scenography ===
- El último payador (1950)
- Las aventuras de Jack (1949)
- La otra y yo (1949)
- Pobre, mi madre querida (1948)
- La serpiente de cascabel (1948)
- El precio de una vida (1947)
- La cumparsita (1947)
- Madame Bovary (1947)
- Los hijos del otro (1947)
- Musical Romance (1947)
- Cumbres de hidalguía (1947)
- María Rosa (1946)
- The Circus Cavalcade (1945)
- Cuando la primavera se equivoca (1944)
- Su mejor alumno (1944)
- Eclipse de sol (1943)
- Cuando florezca el naranjo (1943)
- Los hijos artificiales (1943)
- Tres hombres del río (1943)
- La Guerra Gaucha (1942)
- El gran secreto (1942)
- En el viejo Buenos Aires (1942)
- El viejo Hucha (1942)
- Cruza (1942)
- En el último piso (1942)
- Yo quiero morir contigo (1941)
- The Gaucho Priest (1941)
- El mozo número 13 (1941)
- La quinta calumnia (1941)
- Volver a vivir (1941)
- Chingolo (1940)
- La carga de los valientes (1940)
- Encadenado (1940)
- El hijo del barrio (1940)
- Corazón de turco (1940)
- Prisioneros de la tierra (1939)
- Atorrante (La venganza de la tierra) (1939)
- Nativa (1939)
- ...Y los sueños pasan (1939)
