= Tita Merello =

Argentine actress and singer (1904–2002)

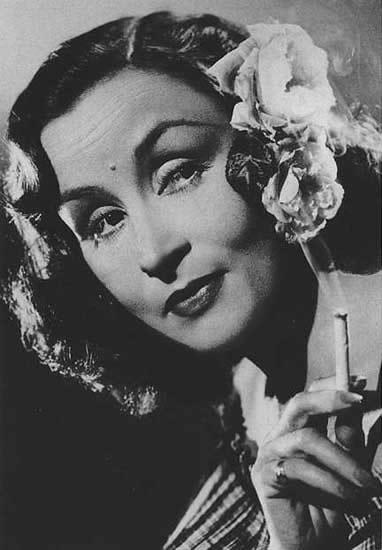
- Born: Laura Ana Merello; 11 October 1904; Buenos Aires, Argentina
- Died: 24 December 2002 (aged 98); San Telmo, Buenos Aires, Argentina
- Resting place: La Chacarita Cemetery
- Occupations: Actress; dancer; singer
- Years active: 1930–1985

Laura Ana Merello (11 October 1904 – 24 December 2002), better known as Tita Merello, was an Argentine film actress, tango dancer and singer of the Golden Age of Argentine cinema. In her six decades in Argentine entertainment, at the time of her death, she had filmed over thirty movies, premiered twenty plays, had nine television appearances, completed three radio series and had had countless appearances in print media. She was one of the singers who emerged in the 1920s along with Azucena Maizani, Libertad Lamarque, Ada Falcón, and Rosita Quiroga, who created the female voices of tango. She was primarily remembered for the songs "Se dice de mí" and "La milonga y yo".

She began her theater career as a vedete in Buenos Aires revue, and may have also acted in silent films. She debuted on the first sound movie produced in Argentina, ¡Tango!, with Libertad Lamarque in 1933. After making a series of films throughout the 1930s, she established herself as a dramatic actress in La fuga (1937), directed by Luis Saslavsky. In the mid-1940s, she moved to Mexico, where she filmed Cinco rostros de mujer (1947), which earned her an Ariel Award from the Mexican Academy of Film. She returned to Argentina and starred in Don Juan Tenorio (1949) and Filomena Marturano (1950), which were subsequently taken to the theater. Her period of greatest popularity came in the following decade, when she led films like Los isleros (1951), considered her best performance, Guacho (1954) and Mercado de abasto (1955). She also received praise for her work in Arrabalera (1950), Para vestir santos (1955) and El amor nunca muere (1955).

From the 1960s, most of her work was directed by Enrique Carreras. During the period, she had a recurring role in the television series Sábados Circulares and continued making films, like Amorina (1961). Her role in 1974 as La Madre María, directed by Lucas Demare, was highly acclaimed as was her collaboration with Alejandro Doria in Los miedos (1980). She retired from theater in 1984 and films in 1985 but continued to act on TV and radio and was honored as "Citizen of the City of Buenos Aires" in 1990. Until her death at age 98, she continued to make appearances on television and radio.

== Biography ==
=== Early years ===
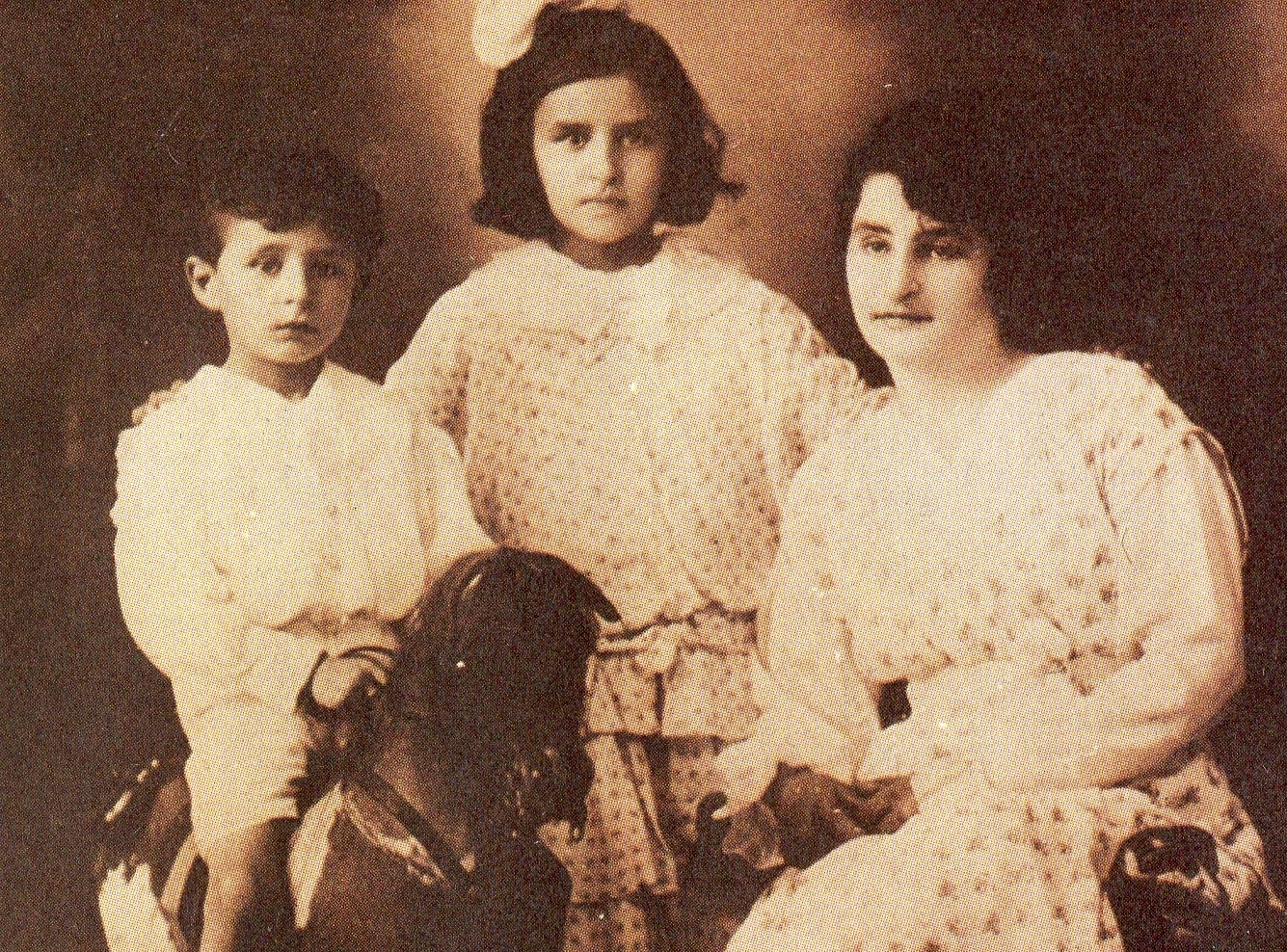
Tita Merello in the center with her brother Pascual (left) and their mother, Ana (right)

Laura Ana Merello, known as "Tita" was born on 11 October 1904 in a tenement in the neighborhood of San Telmo, Buenos Aires to the coachman Santiago Merello and an ironer, Ana Gianelli. The house where she was born has been designated as a historical site. Her birth certificate did not show her mother's name, but when she was four, her mother's name was recorded with the mother's nationality of Uruguayan. She had a younger half-brother, Pascual Anselmi, who had a different father.

Her father died of tuberculosis when she was less than a year old. Merello had a difficult childhood marked by poverty. She was sent to an orphan asylum at age five because her mother had to work. While still a child, she was taken to Montevideo, Uruguay, where she worked as a maid without pay. At age 9, she was diagnosed with tuberculosis and sent to a farm near Magdalena, where she worked in exchange for room and board, milking cows, cutting yerba mate and grilling food for the workers. She said she knew hunger and fear firsthand, as she lived it every day of her childhood, never going to school or learning to read or write. As an adult, she said of her childhood that it was brief, "Poor childhood is shorter than that of the rich. It was sad, poor and ugly".

At age 12, she returned to the tenement to live with her mother She went to work in a seedy club called Ba Ta Clán, where the chorus girls became known as bataclanas. The place had a reputation and women who worked there were thought to be employed somewhere between the "lunfardo" (the Argentine underworld) and a bordello. Around 1917, Merello began working as a showgirl in the Rosita Rodriguez Company at Teatro Avenida and debuted in a play called Las vírgenes de teres. She was booed off the stage and vowed never to sing again, but hunger forced her to look for work in the cafés along the Avenida de Mayo.

She soon earned popularity with her interpretation of the tango "Titina". She met the editor of the newspaper, La Nacion, Eduardo Borrás when she was fifteen, who began helping her learn to read. He later introduced her to Simón Yrigoyen Iriondo, who took charge of ending her illiteracy. Around 1919, she was performing at the Teatro Porteño in the chorus line and was fined 20 pesos because she wasn't wearing stockings. Years later, in the 1930s, Morello commented how things had changed and women were being paid to go without them.

Some sources have claimed that Merello filmed silent movies in this period; others claim that "a" movie happened a decade later in 1928; and some claim her first film was not until ¡Tango! in 1933. Some claim there were three films, Buenos Aires tenebroso (1918), a crime drama; La garra porteña; (1918), and Amor de primavera (1918–1919) both directed by Juan Glizé and Vicente Marracino. Multiple sources claim she made Buenos Aires tenebroso directed by Juan Glizé but the year varies from 1917 to 1928.

Tragedy befell her again at the age of 16, when her mother succumbed to tuberculosis and she began wandering from house to house, family to friends and back again. She became a vedette and was known as "La Vedette Rea", but her repertoire and fiery temper gave her a reputation that was counter to other performers, like Sofía Bozán. Her interpretation often incorporated deliberate farce to express the complexities of life. and while she was not known for having a great voice, she gained admiration for the expressiveness of her interpretations, which was well suited for the drama of tango.

=== Legitimate theater and recording beginnings (1923–1933) ===
In 1923, she got a part as a show girl in the revue Las modernas Scherezadas playing at the renowned Teatro Maipo, performing with the stars Luis Arata, Pepe Arias, and Marcos Caplán. The show's playbills are dated 1924 and list her as the star "La vedette rea". She sang "Trago amargo", a tango, to wide acclaim. That same year, she was in the cast of Cayol's Revue ¿Quién dijo miedo?

In 1925, she performed in the revue Mujeres, flores y alegría, in which she sang the tango "Pedime lo que Querés" by Francisco Canaro with lyrics by Juan Andrés Caruso. Later that year she premiered the tango "Leguisamo Solo" by Modesto Papavero, which had been written as homage to Uruguayan jockey Irineo Leguisamo. The tango appeared in the revue En la raya lo esperamos by Luis Bayón Herrera at the Teatro Bataclán.

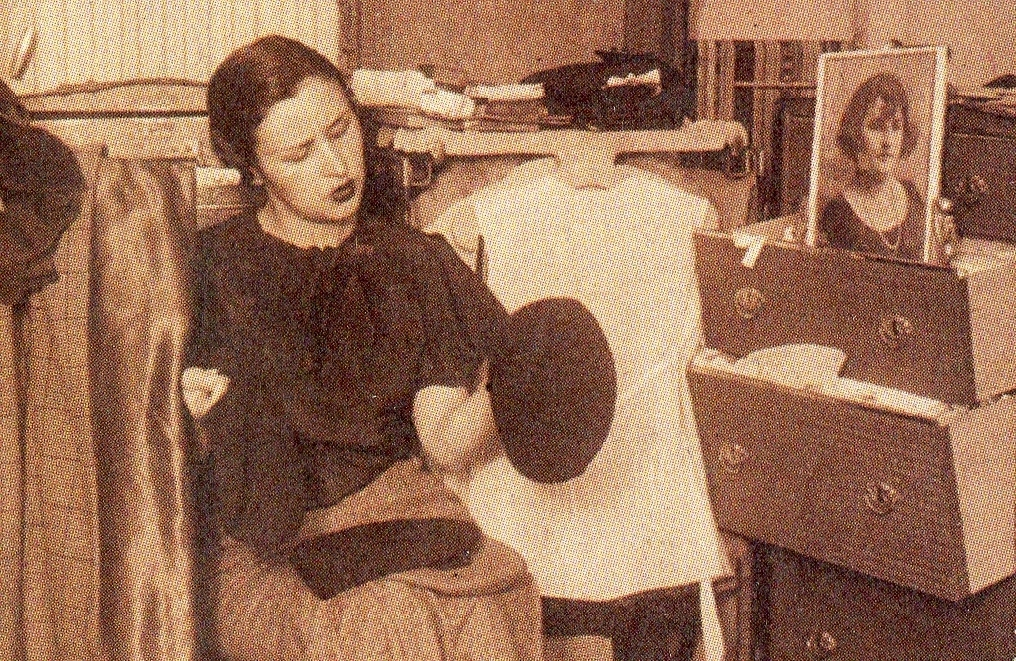
Tita Merello working in the wardrobe room, c. 1930.

She finally was asked to play a role in a dramatic play, El Lazo; her performance earned her an introduction to Pascual Carcavallo, owner of the Teatro Nacional. In 1927, she returned to the Maipo theater to perform the tango "Un tropezón" with Elías Alippi and Sofia Bozán. The performance was criticized harshly by Carlos Gardel, considered the greatest tango performer at the time.

Merello alternated acting with a few forays into recording. In 1927, she recorded two songs for the Nacional-Odeon disc label: "Te acordás reo" and "Volvé mi negra". Between 1927 and 1929 she recorded 18 tangos, in her typical theatrical style. Between 1929 and 1930, she recorded twenty songs for the label RCA Victor, including "Tata... Llevame pal centro", "Che... Pepinito", and "Te has comprado un automovil". In 1930, she performed onstage in El rancho del hermano.

In 1931, Merello began working at the Revista Voces (Voices Magazine). She was paid 200 pesos for the first article she published. In addition, she wrote pieces for the publisher Abril's Revista Nocturno (Night Magazine) and obtained a journalist's press card.

A big opportunity presented itself in 1931. Libertad Lamarque had been playing the role of Doce Pesos in "El conventillo de la Paloma" for two years and had over 1,000 performances. She was ready to quit the production and she offered the part to Merello, who quickly accepted. The following year, in 1932, as part of the Compañia de Canaro she worked on the play "La muchachada del centro" and performed the tangos "La muchachada del centro" and a milonga "Me enamore una vez" in the play. It was very successful, running for nearly 900 performances.

=== Early film career (1933–1945) ===
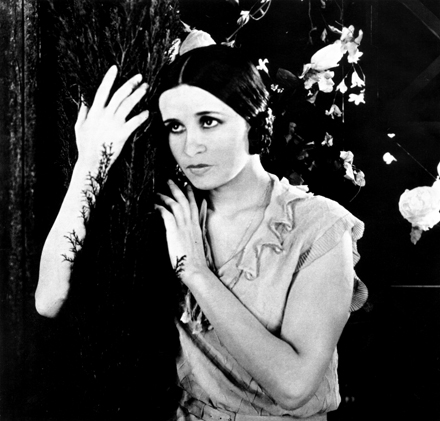
Merello in the influential ¡Tango! (1933), the first sound film in Argentine cinema.

She made her debut in talking films in Argentina's first sound film, ¡Tango! (1933), directed by Luis José Moglia Barth, for which she received 200 pesos. The stars of the film were Pepe Arias and Libertad Lamarque. She would also meet a young comic in the film, Luis Sandrini, who had a small part in the film. She followed it with Ídolos de la radio (1934) a production by Francisco Canaro directed by Eduardo Morera and written by Nicolás de las Llanderas and Arnaldo Malfatti. The musical starred many of Argentina's radio stars. The film was successful and led to the creation of both radio magazines and a new genre of film.

In 1935, she starred in Noches de Buenos Aires directed by Manuel Romero with Fernando Ochóa, Severo Fernández and Irma Córdoba.

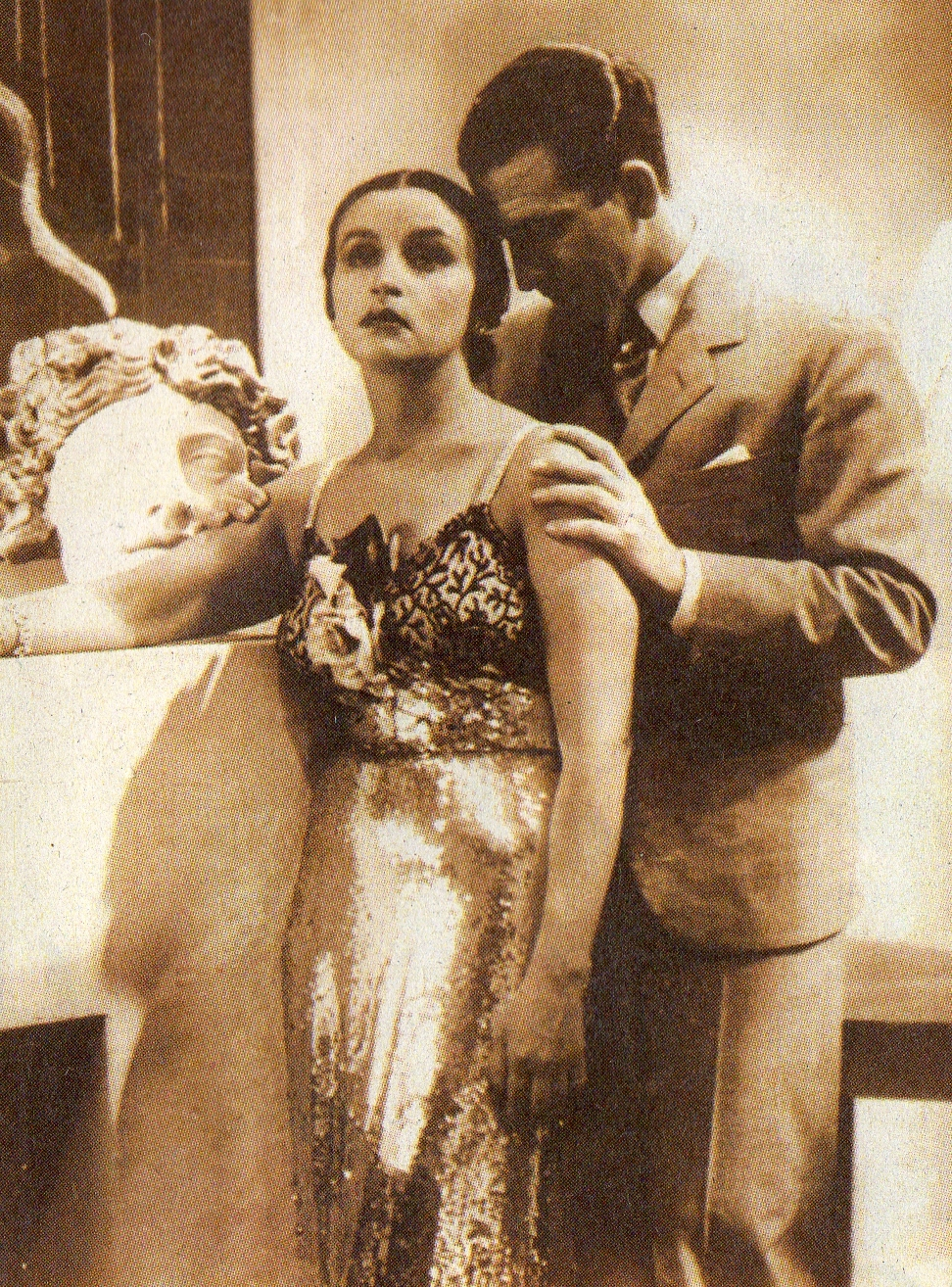
Tita Merello and Francisco Petrone in La fuga (1937).

In Así es el tango (1937), directed by Eduardo Morera with Olinda Bozán, Merello played a comic role opposite the heroine's role assigned to Luisa Vehil. That same year she followed in a dramatic role in the film, La fuga under the direction of Luis Saslavsky which featured the tango "Niebla del Riachuelo" performed by Merello and written by Enrique Cadícamo. The movie starred Santiago Arrieta and Francisco Petrone and earned praise from the critics. Following the trend, she began a theatrical run in Montevideo, Uruguay in the play Santa María del Buen Ayre written by Enrique Larreta, which was one of her most acclaimed theatrical roles.

Merello was in the play Sexteto by Ladislao Fodor, under the direction of Edmundo Guibourg opened in 1941 in Montevideo at the Teatro Artigas, starring Gloria Guzmán. She made two films in 1942, Ceniza al viento directed by Luis Saslavsky with Pedro López Lagar, Alita Román, and Berta Singerman and 27 millones directed by José Bohr and not released until 1947.

In 1943, she premiered the play Buenos Aires de ayer y de hoy by Ivo Pelay and Francisco Canaro in Montevideo. The play contained a song that would become recognized as a signature song for Merello, "Se dice de mí". The cast was led by Merello and included the actors Amalia Bernabé, Lalo Malcolm, Maruja Pibernat, Elvira Prada, Enrique Roldán, and Tomás Simari; and singers Eduardo Adrián and Carlos Roldán. After the opening in Uruguay, the play moved in 1944 to the Teatro Alvear in Buenos Aires, where it enjoyed 600 performances. That same year, she also starred in Dos corazones by Pelay at the Alvear with Merello singing "Todo es mentira" and "¿Qué tal?". After completing the season in Argentina, the play moved to the Teatro Artigas of Montevideo.

In 1945, she performed in Una mujer y un hombre by Pelay under the direction of Manuel Romero and then Merello brought Sexteto from Uruguay to Argentina and premiered the play in Mexico. In January 1946, she took it to Chile, premiering at the Lux.

=== Middle career (1946–1955) ===
In late 1946, Merello went with Sandrini to Mexico. She was contracted to play the cabaret woman who seduced the star Arturo de Córdova in Cinco rostros de mujer The film was directed by Gilberto Martínez Solares and starred Merello, Córdova and Ana María Campoy. Originally three films were to have been made, but the production company went into receivership after one film. She won an Ariel Award as Best Supporting Actress for her work in "Faces" at the 1948 ceremonies. She returned to Argentina in 1947 and appeared in the musical comedic play Malena Luce Sus Pistolas, which opened at the Teatro Casino and starred Merello, Roberto Castillo and was the musical debut of Blanquita Amaro.

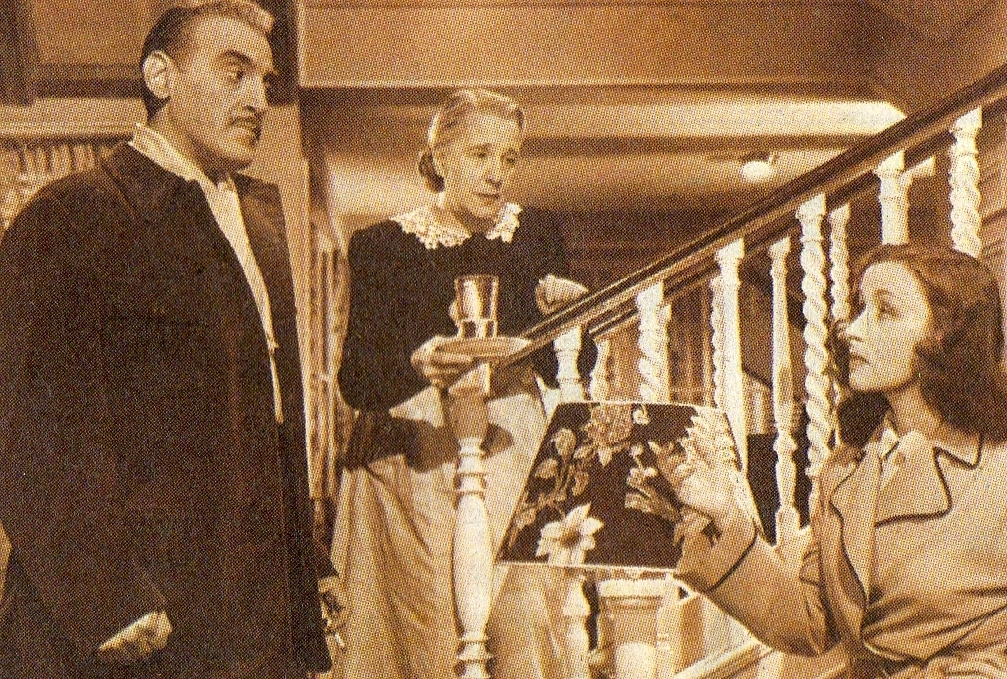
Guillermo Battaglia, Gloria Ferrandiz and Tita Merello in Filomena Marturano (1950)

In 1948, Sandrini returned and he starred with Merello in Don Juan Tenorio, which was released in early 1949. In 1948, she starred in the play Filomena Marturano by Eduardo De Filippo, which premiered at the Politeama and went on to performances at the Smart and Odeón Theaters, reaching over 400 performances before it closed in September 1949 and earning wide acclaim. It was so successful, the play was turned into a movie of the same name directed by Luis Mottura in 1950 starring Merello with Guillermo Battaglia, Gloria Ferrandiz and Alberto de Mendoza.

In 1949, she released Morir en su ley directed by Manuel Romero with Roberto Escalada, Juan José Míguez and Fanny Navarro and La historia del tango directed by Manuel Romero with Fernando Lamas, Virginia Luque and Tito Lusiardo. Merello also started appearing at this time on a weekly radio show called Ahora habla una mujer which aired Monday to Friday at 20:30 on the Private Broadcasting Network.

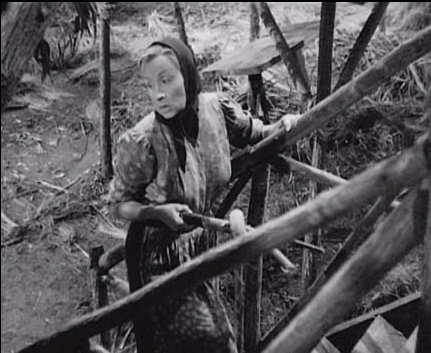
Tita Merello in Los Isleros (1951)

In 1950, Merello starred in one of her most acclaimed films, Arrabalera, directed by Tulio Demicheli in his solo debut with Santiago Gómez Cou. In 1950, she won the Premios Sur Award for Best Actress for her performance in Arrabalera and in 1951 won the Silver Condor Award for Best Actress for it.

Those successes were followed with three films that were directed by Lucas Demare: Los isleros (1951), Guacho (1954) and Mercado de abasto (1955). Los isleros received the Premios Sur Award for Best Actress in 1951, followed by the 1952 Silver Condor Award for Best Actress and Guacho received the 1955 Silver Condor Award for Best Actress. In 1953, she was performing at the Teatro Odeón in Hombres en mi vida by Eduardo Pappo. 1955 proved to be a busy year as she made three other films: Para vestir santos, El Amor Nunca Muere and La Morocha. Para vestir santos was directed by Leopoldo Torre Nilsson with supporting roles by Beatriz Taibo and Yuki Nambá. El amor nunca muere was directed by Luis César Amadori and she starred with Mirtha Legrand and Zully Moreno. Her last film in the period would be La morocha directed by Ralph Pappier with Alfredo Alcón and Luis Arata, which was not released until 1958, because of the 1955 military coup d'état which ended the presidency of Juan Perón and sent many into exile.

In the 1950s, Uruguayan travesti Gloria Meneses impersonated Merello as part of her cabaret performances.

=== Exile and underground (1955–1958) ===
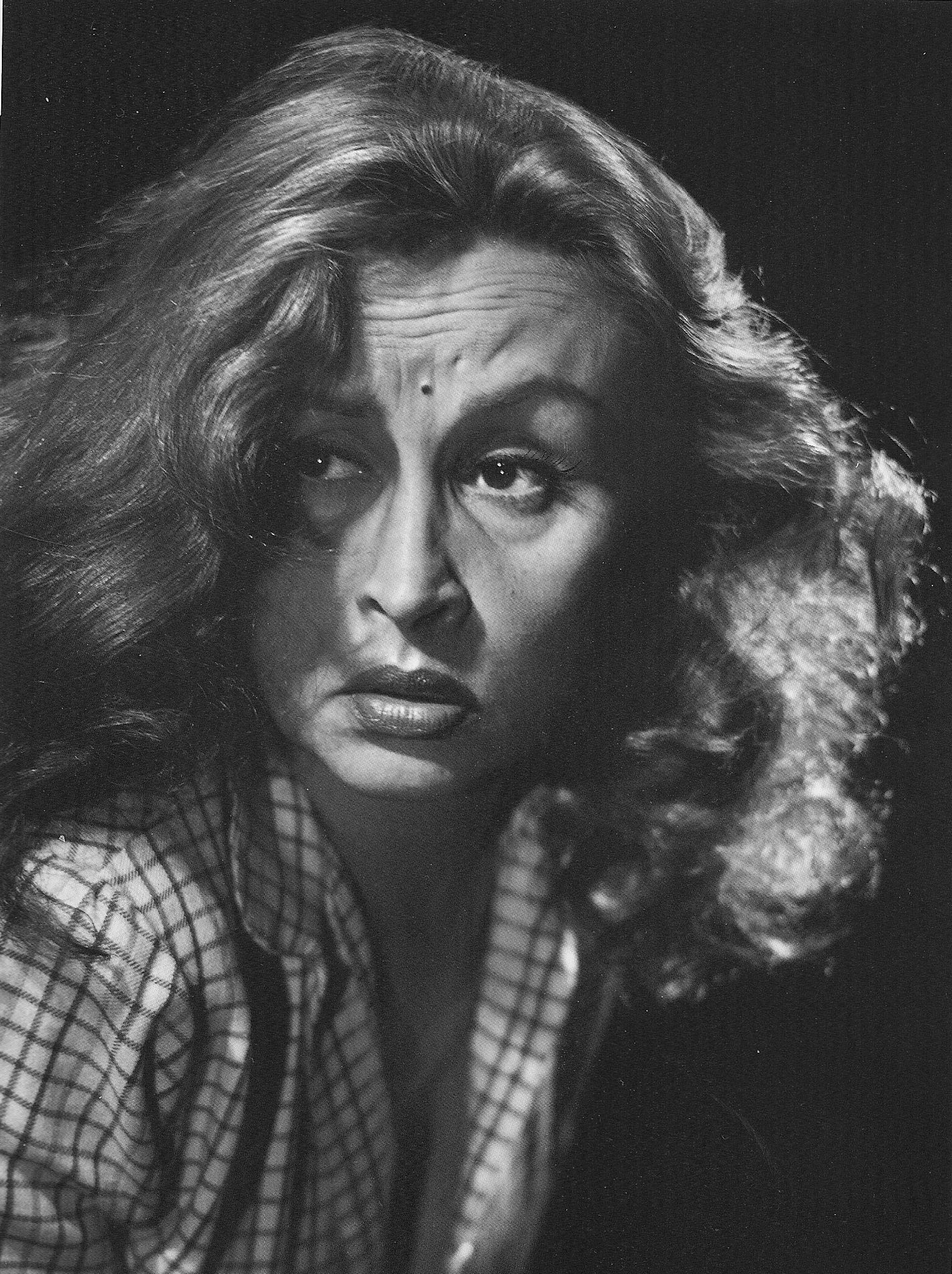
Tita Merello in 1952

Though Merello was not political, her success under the Perón regime made her a target and she was accused of trafficking Ceylon tea by an investigating commission. Fleeing to Mexico to escape, she thought she might never work again. There were many artists whose careers came to an end, many who believed that "laughing either at or with a working-class" person would never be possible again. There were no protections in place for artistic expression, leaving artists vulnerable to the whims of whoever was in power.

She tried to settle in Mexico, but was unable to find work. Merello returned to Argentina at the invitation of Hugo del Carril and worked in an amusement park. As she was banned from working in mainstream theater, she worked out of sight of the censors with del Carril, with the pianist and composer Héctor Stamponi, and by recording music with Francisco Canaro.

At one point, she worked for a time in the circus and in 1957, she returned to Mexico and did a television production of Eugene O'Neill's Before Breakfast (Antes del desayuno). In 1958, when Arturo Frondizi was elected to the Argentine presidency, Merello was able to return to the country and resume work in movies and the theater.

=== Late career (1958–1985) ===
She immediately returned to the stage in 1958 with two productions: Amorina by Eduardo Borrás followed by Luces de Buenos Aires starring Merello, Hugo del Carril and Mariano Mores. She starred in Miércoles de ceniza by Luis Basurto in 1959 under the direction of Cecilio Madanes, sharing the lead alternately with Eva Frano and in 1961 she performed Estrellas en el Avenia under the direction of Cecilio Madanes. In 1961, she also made a film of the earlier play she had been in Amorina under the direction of Hugo del Carril, who also acted in the film with Golde Flami.

She returned to the theater in 1962 with La Moreira by Juan Carlos Ghiano and the following year performed Carolina Paternóster by Eduardo Pappo. In 1964, Merello accepted a television role starring in the Channel 11 telenovela Acacia Montero under the direction of Martín Clutet. That same year, she also made three films. Los evadidos was directed by Enrique Carreras and Merello played opposite Jorge Salcedo. Mercedes Carreras and Ángel Magaña starred with her in Ritmo nuevo, vieja ola, directed by Carreras and it wouldn't be released until 1965. In La industria del matrimonio, she again teamed with Magaña and Enrique Carreras.

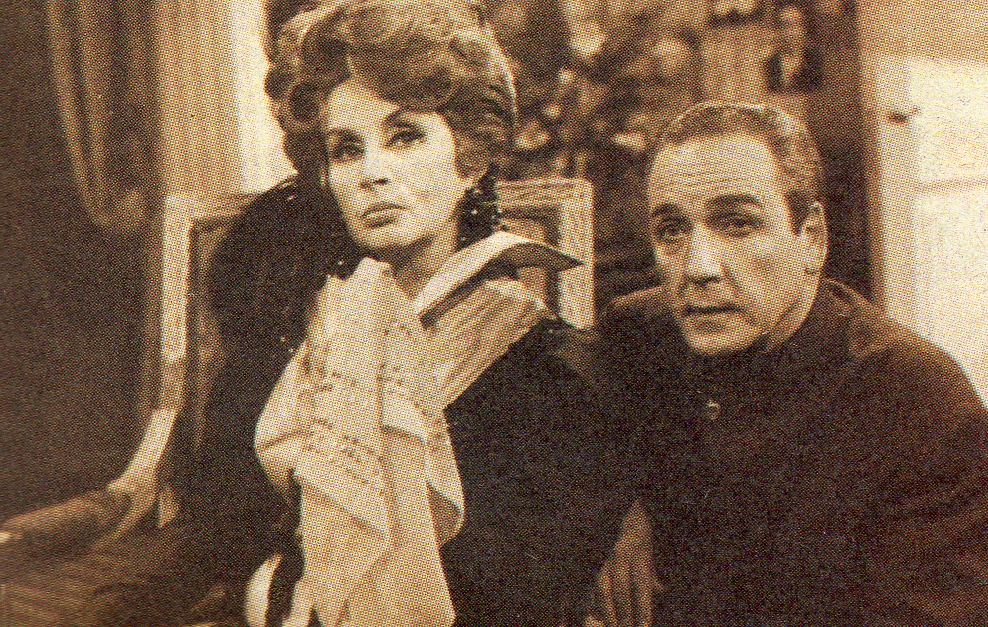
Tita Merello and Osvaldo Miranda in Ídolos de entrecasa (1968)

Merello filmed Los hipócritas in 1965 under the direction of Enrique Carreras and in 1966 returned to the stage appearing in El andador by Norberto Aroldi, which was made into a film of the same name in 1967 under the direction of Enrique Carreras. She made two more films with Carreras directing, ¡Ésto es alegría! (1967) and ¡Viva la vida! (1969) to finish the 1960s. According to her autobiography, Merello also made nearly 40 recordings during this period with the orchestra of Carlos Figari and Héctor Varela.

Merello hosted a talk show, Charlando de todo con Tita on channel 13 from 1970 to 1971 where she told anecdotes, sang and gave advice. In 1972, she played in Mar del Plata with a production of Astros y estrellas. Merello published her autobiography La calle y yo (The Street and I) in 1972.

She starred in the production of En vivo y al desnudo by Gerardo and Hugo Sofovich in 1973 and, in 1974, made the film La Madre María under the direction of Lucas Demare, which was well received.

Merello starred in La risa es salud by Hugo Moser in 1976 and then joined the cast of the Teatro Astros in a theatrical revue led by Adolfo Stray and Thelma Tixou. She filmed El canto cuenta su historia (1976) and finished out the year at Mar del Plata in a revue with Los Chalchaleros and Mariano Mores.

In 1980, she filmed Los miedos under the direction of Alejandro Doria with Soledad Silveyra and Miguel Ángel Solá. The following year, she revived a talk show format for television with the ATC Channel's Todo Tita. She received a Konex Foundation Diploma of Merit for Best Actress of Dramatic Film and Theater in 1981 and a building, called the Tita Merello Complex on Suipacha Street was named in her honor by the Institute of Cinema and Audiovisual Arts to acknowledge her stature in Argentine film.

After a cancer scare in the 1980s, Merello became the spokeswoman for a series of PSAs reminding women to get annual Pap tests and gynecological exams. In 1984, Merello made her last theatrical appearance in Para alquilar balcones as 1/3 of the lead trio with Hugo del Carril and Osvaldo Pacheco. She made her last film in 1985, Las barras bravas and later that same year won a second Diploma of Merit from the Konex Foundation for recognition as Female Tango Singer.

In the late 1980s and early 1990s she did many guest appearances on television. She was also impersonated by Usha Didi Gunatita, part of the ensemble Trans Faces. In 1987 Merello was awarded the title "honorable neighbor" of the city of Villa Gesell and shortly thereafter named "Living Legend Citizen of the City of Buenos Aires". From 1990 to 1992 she appeared in the ATC series Polémica en el bar.

She received the Argentina Association of Actors (AAA) Premio Pablo Podestá in 1991, a plaque was affixed marking the place of her birth in 1993, in 1996 she was honored by the National Endowment for the Arts and in 1999 the Neighborhood Association of San Cristobal named a city square after her.

== Personal life and death ==
Merello never married, but she had a decade-long affair with the actor Luis Sandrini. They met in the 1930s on the set of ¡Tango! but for several years were just friends who went to events together. In the late 1930s the affair became passionate and Merello referred to Sandrini as the love of her life. She followed him to Mexico in 1946, but was unable to go with him to Spain during his 1948 trip. When he returned, Sandrini met and married the actress Malvina Pastorino in Uruguay in 1952.

Merello died on Christmas Eve 2002, aged 98.

== Autobiography ==
- Merello, Tita. La Calle Y Yo Buenos Aires: Editorial Kier (1972) (in Spanish)

== Awards ==
- 1948 Ariel Award Best Supporting Actress, Mexico for Cinco rostros de mujer
- 1950 Premios Sur Best Actress Award for Arrabalera
- 1951 Silver Condor Best Actress award for Arrabalera
- 1951 Premios Sur Best Actress Award for Los Isleros
- 1952 Silver Condor Best Actress award for Los Isleros
- 1955 Silver Condor Best Actress Award for Guacho
- 1981 Konex Foundation Diploma of Merit - Actress Dramatic Film and Theatre
- 1985 Konex Foundation Diploma of Merit – Female Tango Singer
- 1991 Premio Pablo Podestá Argentina Association of Actors (AAA)
- 1996 Statuette Luna del Fondo Nacional de la Artes
- 2005 National University of Lanus (UNLa) revealed a mural on the wall of the theater auditorium in tribute to Merello.

== Filmography ==
- ¡Tango! (1933)
- Idolos de la radio (1934)
- Buenos Aires Nights (1935)
- Así es el tango (1937)
- La fuga (1937)
- Ceniza al viento (1942)
- 27 millones (1942)
- Five Faces of Woman (1947)
- Don Juan Tenorio (1949)
- La historia del tango (1949)
- Morir en su ley (1949)
- Filomena Marturano (1950)
- Arrabalera (1950)
- Los isleros (1951)
- To Live for a Moment (1951)
- Pasó en mi barrio (1951)
- Deshonra (1952)
- Gaucho (1954)
- Mercado de abasto (1955)
- Para vestir santos (1955)
- El Amor Nunca Muere (1955)
- La Morocha (1955)
- Amorina (1961)
- Los evadidos (1964)
- Ritmo nuevo, vieja ola (1964)
- La industria del matrimonio (1964)
- Los hipócritas (1965)
- Al Corazón (1966)
- ¡Ésto es alegría! (1967)
- El Andador (1967)
- ¡Viva la vida! (1969)
- La Madre María (1974)
- El canto cuenta su historia (1976)
- Los miedos (1980)
- Las barras bravas (1985)
