= Silver Condor Award for Best Director =

Annual Argentine film award

The Silver Condor Award for Best Director (Spanish: Premio Cóndor de Plata a la mejor director), given by the Argentine Film Critics Association, awards the best director in Argentina each year:

Year	Director	Film
2021	Paula Hernández	Las siamesas
2020	Paula Hernández	Los sonámbulos
2019	Benjamín Naishtat; Luis Ortega	Rojo; El Ángel
2018	Lucrecia Martel	Zama
2017	Lorena Muñoz	Gilda, no me arrepiento de este amor
2016	Pablo Agüero	Eva no duerme
2015	Damián Szifrón	Relatos salvajes
2014	Lucía Puenzo	Wakolda
2013	Benjamín Ávila	Infancia clandestina
2012	Carlos Sorín	El gato desaparece
2011	Pablo Trapero	Carancho
2010	Juan José Campanella	El secreto de sus ojos
2009	Leonardo Favio	Aniceto
2008	Esteban Sapir	La antena
2007	Daniel Burman	Derecho de familia
2006	Fabián Bielinsky	El aura
2005	Adolfo Aristarain	Roma
2004	Alejandro Agresti	Valentín
2003	Carlos Sorín	Historias mínimas
2002	Juan José Campanella	El hijo de la novia
2001	Fabián Bielinsky	Nueve reinas
2000	Marco Bechis; Juan José Campanella	Garage Olimpo; El mismo amor, la misma lluvia
1999	Eduardo Mignogna	El faro
1998	Adolfo Aristarain	Martín (Hache)
1997	Eduardo Mignogna	Sol de otoño
1996	Juan Bautista Stagnaro	Casas de fuego
1995	Tristán Bauer	Cortázar
1994	María Luisa Bemberg; Leonardo Favio	De eso no se habla Gatica, el mono
1993	Adolfo Aristarain; Eliseo Subiela	Un lugar en el mundo El lado oscuro del corazón
1992	Tristán Bauer	Después de la tormenta
1991	Eliseo Subiela	Últimas imágenes del naufragio
1990	Osvaldo Andéchaga	La ciudad oculta
1989	Miguel Pereira	Verónico Cruz: La deuda interna
1988	Eliseo Subiela	Hombre mirando al sudeste
1987	Fernando Solanas	El exilio de Gardel (Tangos)
1986	Luis Puenzo	La historia oficial
1985	Alejandro Doria	Darse cuenta
1983	Adolfo Aristarain	Últimos días de la víctima
1982	Adolfo Aristarain	Tiempo de revancha
1981	Raúl de la Torre	El infierno tan temido
1974	Leopoldo Torre Nilsson	Los siete locos
1973	Leopoldo Torre Nilsson	La maffia
1972	Fernando Ayala; Enrique Carreras	Argentino hasta la muerte La valija
1971	David José Kohon	Con alma y vida
1970	Manuel Antín	Don Segundo Sombra
1969	Leopoldo Torre Nilsson	Martín Fierro
1968	Leonardo Favio	El romance del Aniceto y la Francisca
1967	Leopoldo Torre Nilsson	El ojo que espía
1966	Rodolfo Kuhn	Pajarito Gómez
1965	Enrique Carreras	Los evadidos
1964	Juan Antonio Bardem	Los inocentes
1963	Manuel Antín	La cifra impar
1962	Lautaro Murúa	Alias Gardelito
1961	Leopoldo Torre Nilsson	Un Guapo del '900
1960	Leopoldo Torre Nilsson	La caída
1959	Fernando Ayala	El jefe
1957	Fernando Ayala	Los tallos amargos
1956	Fernando Ayala	Ayer fue primavera
1955	Lucas Demare	Guacho
1954	Ralph Pappier	Caballito criollo
1953	Hugo del Carril	Las aguas bajan turbias
1952	Lucas Demare	Los Isleros
1951	Ralph Pappier	Escuela de campeones
1950	Daniel Tinayre	Danza del fuego
1949	Luis César Amadori	Dios se lo pague
1948	Luis César Amadori	Albéniz
1947	Mario Soffici	Celos
1946	Luis Saslavsky	La dama duende
1945	Lucas Demare	Su mejor alumno
1944	Augusto César Vatteone	Juvenilia
1943	Lucas Demare	La guerra gaucha
