= María Rosa Gallo =

Argentine actress

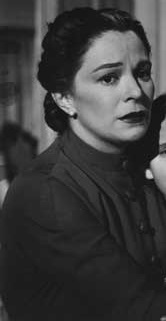
- Born: December 20, 1925
- Died: December 7, 2004 (aged 78)
- Occupation: Actor
- Years active: 1945–2004

María Rosa Gallo (December 20, 1925 – December 7, 2004) was an Argentine actress.

== Career ==
Born of a Calabrian father and Spanish mother on 20 December 1925, Gallo studied at the Conservatorio Nacional de Música y Arte Dramático (National Conservatory of Music and Performing Arts) under Antonio Cunill Cabanellas. She graduated in 1943 with a gold medal and made her debut the same year in Eva Franco's El Carnaval del Diablo ("The Carnival of the Devil"). She received rave reviews and compared favorably to Margarita Xirgu.

In 1947, following the election of Juan Perón, Gallo left Argentina for Chile and, eventually, Italy. In Rome she studied at the Silvio D'Amico Academy of Dramatic Arts with the director Silvio D'Amico, director, and Orazio Costa. After graduating in 1952, she appeared in Dialogues of the Carmelites at the Piccolo Teatro Della Città Di Roma and starred in the world premiere of Diego Fabbri's Processo a Gesù ("The Trial of Jesus") at the Piccolo Teatro di Milano.

Returning to Argentina in 1958, she performed in many successful plays including The Dog in the Manger, with Alfredo Alcón and Osvaldo Bonet, and Les Troyens, which received the Critics Award from the National Endowment for the Arts. Television performances include Romeo y Julieta, Perla Negra ("The Black Pearl") (for both of which she received two separate Martin Fierro Awards for her performances), and, more recently, 22 El Loco alongside Adrián Suar, where she played the grandmother of the protagonist. Her film credits include The Hand in the Trap, winner of the FIPRESCI Prize at the 1961 Cannes Film Festival.

She has been honored at the Sea Star Awards (Premios Estrella de Mar), at the Silver Condor Awards, received the Diamond Konex Award in 1991, and was presented with the ACE Gold Award at the 1995 ACE Awards for her performance in the Three Tall Women.

== Personal life ==
Maria Rosa Gallo was married to actor Camilo Da Passano and had two children, Alejandra Da Passano and Claudio Da Passano, both actors.

She was active in the labor and democratic movements, particularly during and after the military dictatorship of the National Reorganization Process. In 2002, she participated in the cycle Teatro por la Identidad ("Theater for Identity"), organized by Grandmothers of the Plaza de Mayo (Asociación Civil Abuelas de Plaza de Mayo), in support of children stolen and illegally adopted during the Argentine Dirty War.

She died at age 78 on December 7, 2004.

== Credits ==
=== Theatre ===
- 1943: El carnaval del diablo, by Juan Oscar Ponferrada.
- 1946: Fascinación, by M. Winter. Premio de la Crítica and Revista Talía.
- 1946: Todos los hijos de Dios tienen alas, by Eugene O'Neill. Teatro Odeón.
- 1946: El mercader de Venecia, by W. Shakespeare. Teatro Nacional Cervantes.
- 1949: La sonrisa de la Gioconda, by A. Huxley. Dir. Orestes Caviglia. Teatro Splendid.
- 1950: Prontuario, Teatro Astral and Teatro Municipal de Chile.
- 1952: Dialogues of the Carmelites, by Georges Bernanos. Dir. Orazio Costa. Compañía Piccolo Teatro Della Città Di Roma. Italy.
- 1954: Proceso a Gesù, Dir. Orazio Costa. Compañía del Piccolo Teatro Di Milano. Tour around Italy.
- 1955: Il pianto della Madonna, by Iacopone Da Todi. Adap. Silvio D´amico. Outdoor theater in Taormina and Firenze.
- 1956: La vida de Cristo, Dir. O. Costa. Teatro Verde of the Island of San Gregorio, Venezia. Italy.
- 1958: El perro del hortelano, by Lope de Vega. Dir. Osvaldo Bonet.
- 1958: Recordando con ira, by J. Osborne.
- 1959: El farsante más grande del mundo, by J. M. Synge. Dir. Osvaldo Bonet.
- 1960: Orfeo desciende, by Tennessee Williams. Dir. Osvaldo Bonet.
- 1960: Liliom, de Molnar. Dir. Osvaldo Bonet.
- 1963: Tungasuka, by Bernardo Canal Feijo. Dir. Francisco Petrone.
- 1963: Rashomon, Teatro San Telmo. (American version of a Japanese legend).
- 1964: Amoretta, by Osvaldo Dragún.
- 1965: Una mujer por encomienda, by Osvaldo Dragún.
- 1968: El amasijo, by Osvaldo Dragún.
- 1972/73 y 1977: Las troyanas, by Euripides, Adap. Sartre. Dir. Osvaldo Bonet. Choirmaster: José Antonio Gallo. Teatro Municipal General San Martín.
- 1973/74/75: Amor y locura, monologues of great works in literature. Tour around Argentina, Paraguay and Uruguay.
- 1976: La Gallo y yo, by Carlos Gorostiza. Dir. José A. Gallo. Teatro de la Casa de Castagnino.
- 1976: Los rústicos, by Carlos Goldoni. Dir. Rodolfo Graziano. Teatro Municipal Gral. San Martín.
- 1977 y 1982: La casa de Bernarda Alba, by Federico García Lorca. Dir. Alejandra Boero. Tour around URSS by the Teatro Municipal Gral. San Martín.
- 1978 y 1983: De nuevo aquí, monologue. Tour in Argentina and Paraguay.
- 1978: El amor, by Gregorich. Dir. Kive Staif. Teatro Municipal Gral. San Martín.
- 1978: La libertad, by Gregorich. Dir. Osvaldo Bonnet. Teatro Municipal Gral. San Martín.
- 1979: El sombrero de paja de Italia, by Nabiche and Michele. Dir. Rodolfo Graziano. Teatro Nacional Cervantes.
- 1980: Doña Rosita la soltera, by Federico García Lorca. Dir. Osvaldo Cattone. Teatro Marsano de Lima, Peru.
- 1980/81: El conventillo de la Paloma, by Alberto Vaccarezza. Teatro Nacional Cervantes. Mar del Plata.
- 1982: Fedra, by Racine, translated by Manuel Mujica Láinez. Teatro Nacional Cervantes.
- 1984: Adiós, mamá, Teatro Ateneo.
- 1985: Sólo cuando me río, by Neil Simon. Teatro Regina.
- 1987: Sábato, doménica e lunedí, by Eduardo De Filippo. Dir. Cecilio Madanes. Teatro Blanca Podestá.
- 1987: Jugando, with several texts. Teatro Presidente Alvear.
- 1989: Duse, Teatro Municipal Gral. San Martín.
- 1990: Querido Tennessee, Dir. Oscar Barney Finn. Teatro Regina.
- 1991: Confesiones de una sirvienta, Teatro San Martín. Dir. Emilio Alfaro.
- 1994/95: Tres mujeres altas, Dir. Inda Ledesma.
- 1996: El comedor.
- 1998: El jardín de los cerezos, Dir. Agustín Alezzo.
- 1999: Diciendo a Homero.
- 2001: Supongamos by Alicia Muñoz. Dir. Agustín Alezzo.
- 2001: El cerco de Leningrado, by Sanchis Sinisterra. Dir. Osvaldo Bonet.
- 2002: Las extras, by Pepe Cibrián Campoy. Dir. Pepe Cibrián Campoy.
- 2003: Guernica, un llamado a la memoria, voice-over. Dir. María Marta Jiménez, Alejandra Condomí, Germán Suárez.

=== Cinema ===
- 1945: Éramos seis.
- 1946: Albergue de mujeres.
- 1949: Diez segundos, as Elisa.
- 1950: La barca sin pescador.
- 1950: La muerte está mintiendo, as Marta Ferrari.
- 1956: Después del silencio, as Laura.
- 1960: Tire dié (medium length film).
- 1961: La mano en la trampa.
- 1962: El terrorista.
- 1962: La cifra impar.
- 1962: El perseguidor.
- 1964: Canuto Cañete y los 40 ladrones, as «la espiritista».
- 1968: Turismo de carretera.
- 1972: Nino.
- 1973: La malavida, as Taiva.
- 1974: La Mary, as doña Consuelo.
- 1974: Los gauchos judíos, as Brane.
- 1975: Más allá del sol.
- 1975: Una mujer.
- 1975: El grito de Celina, as Juliana.
- 1982: La casa de las siete tumbas, as Azucena.
- 1982: Volver, as Laura.
- 1986: Juegos diabólicos.
- 1987: Con la misma bronca (unfinished).
- 1988: El acompañamiento.
- 1996: El mundo contra mí.
- 2001: La rosa azul (unpublished).

=== Television ===
- 1957: La fierecilla domada, by William Shakespeare. Dir. Raúl Rossi, in Canal 7.
- 1957: Juan del Sur (television theatre).
- 1958: El vals, de Neville. Dir. Raúl Rossi. Canal 7.
- 1959: Historia de jóvenes (television theatre).
- 1960: Dos en la ciudad (television theatre).
- 1962: María, yo, ustedes... (television theatre).
- 1966: Mi querido Luis (television theatre).
- 1966: Romeo y Julieta (television film).
- 1971: Alta comedia, Canal 9.
- 1971: Nino, las cosas simples de la vida
- 1977: El Grupo de los Seis (unitario).
- 1977: Teatro Argentino (unitario).
- 1978: Pueblo Pueblo, de Carlos Lozano Dana. Canal 11.
- 1979: Profesión: ama de casa, by Delia González Márquez. Canal 9.
- 1980: El solitario, miniserie with texts by Guy de Maupassant. Dir. Fernando Heredia. Canal 7.
- 1980: Living room, with Graham Greene. Canal 9.
- 1982: Las brujas (unitario).
- 1982: Mujeres (unitario).
- 1983: Usted y nosotros (unitario).
- 1984/85: Situación límite, Dir. Alejandro Doria.
- 1984/85: De madres e hijas, cycle unitarios with her daughter, the actress Alejandra Da Passano.
- 1985: Libertad condicionada, television theatre.
- 1986: Soñar sin límites, unitarios.
- 1986: Muchacho de Luna, tribute to Federico García Lorca. Dir. Oscar Barney Finn. Awarded in Biarritz.
- 1987: Homenaje a Tennessee Williams, Dir. Oscar Barney Finn.
- 1988: Mi nombre es Coraje, telenovela.
- 1989: La extraña dama, telenovela, Canal 9.
- 1991: Manuela, telenovela, in Canal 13.
- 1992: Soy Gina, telenovela.
- 1995: Perla negra, Telefé.
- 1995: Alta comedia, Canal 9.
- 1995: Zíngara, Telefé.
- 1996: Teatro argentino, «Segundo tiempo».
- 1998: Casa natal, Canal 2.
- 1999: Teatro argentino, «Las de Barranco», ATC.
- 1999/2000: Cabecita, Telefé.
- 2001: 22 (el loco), Canal 13.
- 2002: Kachorra, Telefé.
- 2004: La niñera, Telefé.
