= Después del silencio =

- Directed by: Lucas Demare
- Written by: Sixto Pondal Ríos
- Produced by: Eduardo Bedoya
- Starring: Arturo García Buhr; María Rosa Gallo; Guillermo Battaglia; Mario Passano; Morenita Galé; Enrique Fava; Pedro Laxalt; Blanca Tapia; Gloria Bayardo; Raúl del Valle; Josefa Goldar; Violeta Antier; Domingo Mania; Orestes Soriani
- Music by: Lucio Demare and Bernardo Stalman with themes of Manuel Gómez Carrillo (h) y Manuel Rodríguez Ocampo (h)
- Release date: 1956
- Country: Argentina
- Language: Spanish

Después del silencio (After the silence) is a 1956 Argentinian movie filmed in black and white directed by Lucas Demare on the script by Sixto Pondal Ríos whose main characters were Arturo García Buhr, María Rosa Gallo, Guillermo Battaglia and Mario Passano, which premiered on 13 September 1956. It is a film classified as a pamphleteer that while filming was called Aurora of freedom (Aurora de libertad). It was the last film in which Gloria Bayardo intervened.

== Production ==
The film was made in early 1956, and premiered as part of the celebrations for the first anniversary of the coup, which overthrew the government of Juan Domingo Perón. It was part of a group of films related to the new government regime.

== Synopsis ==
In the mid-1950s a doctor who must attend a detainee by the police who has been tortured begins to be prosecuted. It is freely inspired in the case of student Ernesto Mario Bravo.

== Cast ==
- Arturo García Buhr …Dr. Anselmo Demarco
- María Rosa Gallo …Laura
- Guillermo Battaglia …Pablo Garrido
- Mario Passano …Jacinto Godoy
- Morenita Galé ...Amante de Garrido
- Enrique Fava …Comisario Portela
- Pedro Laxalt …Comisario Blanco
- Blanca Tapia …Beatriz
- Gloria Bayardo …Directora de escuela
- Raúl del Valle…Giordano
- Josefa Goldar …Sra. Godoy
- Violeta Antier ...Srta. Daneri
- Domingo Mania …Inspector de escuelas
- Orestes Soriani …Juez
- Enrique Borrás
- Miguel Dante
- Julio Bianquet …Policía 1
- Tito Grassi
- Aurelia Ferrer …Benita
- Romualdo Quiroga …Torturador
- Warly Ceriani …Médico
- Stella Maris Closas …Kuky
- Rogelio Romano
- Francisco Audenino
- Jorge Villoldo …Delegado
- Lucía Barause …Detenida
- Mercedes Llambí
- Domingo Garibotto …Detenido
- Fernando Campos
- Eduardo Humberto Nóbili …Secretario de Garrido
- Jorge Aries
- Laura Saniez …Enfermera 1
- Teresa Blasco …Enfermera 2
- Roberto Bordoni
- Luis de Lucía
- Alfredo Santa Cruz
- Rafael Diserio …Policía 2
- Mónica Linares
- Eduardo Primo
- Carlos A. Tapia
- Jacinto Curtis
- Luis Odierna
- Jorge Hilton …Extra
