= Zafra (disambiguation) =

Zafra is a city in Badajoz, Spain.

Zafra may also refer to:

- Zafra (agriculture), harvest time, especially that of sugar in the Spanish-speaking Caribbean
- Zafra (film), a 1958 Argentine film
- Zafra (gastropod), a gastropod genus in the family Columbellidae
