= Only the Valiant (1940 film) =

- Directed by: Adelqui Migliar
- Written by: Belisario García Villar
- Starring: Santiago Arrieta; Domingo Sapelli; Anita Jordán
- Cinematography: Gumer Barreiros
- Edited by: Gerardo Rinaldi
- Music by: Lucio Demare
- Production company: Pampa Film
- Release date: 12 June 1940
- Country: Argentina
- Language: Spanish

Only the Valiant or The Charge of the Brave (Spanish:La carga de los valientes) is a 1940 Argentine historical drama film directed by Adelqui Migliar and starring Santiago Arrieta, Domingo Sapelli and Anita Jordán. Produced during the Golden Age of Argentine cinema, it was one of the most films made in Argentina up to that point. It portrays the 1827 defence of Carmen de Patagones against Brazilian forces during the Cisplatine War.

The film's sets were designed by the art director Ralph Pappier. Eva Perón, the future wife of Juan Perón, had a supporting part in the film.

== Cast ==
- Santiago Arrieta
- Domingo Sapelli
- Anita Jordán
- Froilán Varela
- Juan Sarcione
- Roberto Fugazot
- Carlos Fioriti
- Eduardo Trino
- Blanca Orgaz
- Amalia Bernabé
- Alberto Terrones
- Toti Muñoz
- Eva Duarte
- Nelo Cosimi
- Néstor Deval
- Rafael Smurro
- Héctor Torres
- René Mugica
- Roberto Velázquez
- Joaquín Larrazábal
- Ricardo de Rosas

== Bibliography ==
- Plazaola, Luis Trelles. South American Cinema. La Editorial, UPR, 1989.
