= Arrabalera =

Arrabalera may refer to:

- Arrabalera (1950 film), an Argentine musical drama film
- Arrabalera (1951 film), a Mexican comedy drama film
