= Miedo =

Miedo or El miedo or variants may refer to:

- El Miedo, play by Francisco Tobar García
- "El Miedo", poem by Pablo Neruda
- Los Miedos, 1980 Argentine horror film
- Miedo, 1953 horror film directed by León Klimovsky
- "Miedo" (song), by Pablo Alborán, 2011
- "Miedo", a song by Allison, 2017
- "Miedo", a song by María Daniela y su Sonido Lasser, 2005
- "Miedo", a song by Paulina Rubio from Planeta Paulina, 1996
- "Miedo", a song by Pepe Aguilar, 2004
- "Miedo", a song by Tini from Un Mechón de Pelo, 2024
