= Mercado de abasto =

- Directed by: Lucas Demare
- Release date: 1955
- Running time: 90 minute
- Country: Argentina
- Language: Spanish

Mercado de abasto is a 1955 Argentine musical comedy film of the classical-industrial era directed by Lucas Demare.

== Cast ==
- Tita Merello
- Pepe Arias as Lorenzo
- Juan José Miguez
- Pepita Muñoz
- José De Angelis
- Luis Otero
- Marcelle Marcell as Julian
- Joaquín Petrocino
- Luis Tasca
- Inés Murray
- Bertha Moss
- Blanca Lagrotta
- Alberto Terrones
- José Ruzzo
