= The Bastard (1954 film) =

Argentine film

- Directed by: Lucas Demare
- Written by: Lucas Demare; Sergio Leonardo
- Based on: El Jayón by Concha Espina
- Produced by: Lucas Demare; Atilio Mentasti
- Starring: Tita Merello; Carlos Cores
- Cinematography: Alberto Etchebehere
- Edited by: José Serra
- Music by: Lucio Demare; Bernardo Stalman
- Production company: Argentina Sono Film
- Release date: 1954
- Running time: 97 minutes
- Country: Argentina
- Language: Spanish

The Bastard (Spanish: Guacho) is a 1954 film of the classical era of Argentine cinema, directed by Lucas Demare, produced by Argentina Sono Film, and starring Tita Merello. The film won two awards at the eleventh Silver Condor Awards: Best Director and Best Actress, for Merello.

== Synopsis ==
A woman married to a sailor must raise her own son and also the one her husband had with another woman. The two children are quite different from each other: the woman's son is sickly, while the other one is strong. She is thus inclined to claim motherhood of the strong boy and switches their identities. However, her biological son dies in a shipwreck, and the woman's guilt leads her to commit suicide.

== Cast ==
- Tita Merello
- Carlos Cores
- Julia Sandoval
- Enrique Chaico
- Margarita Corona
- Luis Medina Castro
- Néstor Deval
- Alberto Barcel
- Alejandro Rey
- Félix Rivero
- Antonia Volpe
- Orestes Soriani
- Carmen Giménez
- Aída Villadeamigo
- Francisco Audenino
- Mecha Corbo
- María Ferez
- Domingo Garibotto
- Ricardo Carenzo
- Juan Villarreal
- Elvira Quiroga
