= Prisoners of the Earth =

1939 film by Mario Soffici

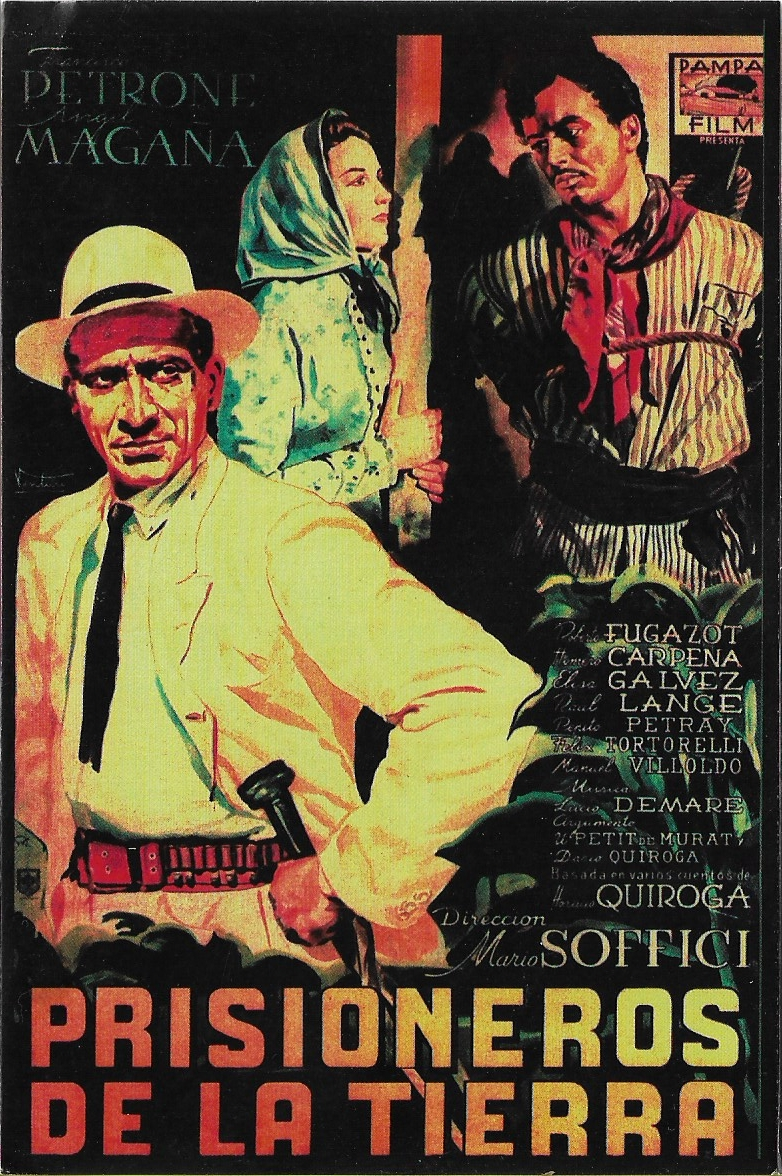
- Theatrical release poster
- Prisioneros de la tierra
- Directed by: Mario Soffici
- Written by: Ulyses Petit de Murat; Darío Quiroga
- Based on: "Una bofetada", "Un peón" and "Los destiladores de naranjas" by Horacio Quiroga
- Starring: Francisco Petrone; Ángel Magaña
- Cinematography: Pablo Tabernero
- Edited by: José de Nico; Gerardo Rinaldi
- Music by: Lucio Demare
- Production company: Pampa Film
- Distributed by: Argentina Sono Film
- Release date: 1939
- Running time: 85 minutes
- Country: Argentina
- Languages: Spanish; Guaraní

Prisoners of the Earth, also known as Prisoners of the Land, (Spanish: Prisioneros de la tierra) is a 1939 Argentine drama film directed by Mario Soffici, one of the most celebrated films of the Golden Age of Argentine cinema. The film premiered in Buenos Aires. The film is often cited as one of the greatest in the history of Argentine cinema, and established Soffici as a "social" filmmaker. It was awarded by the Municipality of Buenos Aires as the best film of the year, and the Silver Condor Award instituted by the Argentine Association of Film Critics.

It was selected as the greatest Argentine film of all time in the polls conducted by the Museo del Cine Pablo Ducrós Hicken in 1977 and 1984, while it ranked 6th in the 2000 edition. In a new version of the survey organized in 2022 by the specialized magazines La vida util, Taipei and La tierra quema, presented at the Mar del Plata International Film Festival, the film reached the 19th position.

== Synopsis ==
Esteban Podeley is a mensú laborer on an isolated yerba mate plantation in Argentina owned by the German Köhner, who acquires laborers through unscrupulous means. He boards Köhner's river ship to the plantation with other laborers including his friends as well as Dr. Else and his daughter Andrea. Dr. Else is sought by Köhner to help address the illnesses of the workers on board the ship and the plantation, but his drunkenness inhibits his ability to perform his duty. Podeley is punished by Köhner for his role in another laborer escaping overboard, but is consoled by Andrea.

On the plantation, the laborers are treated cruelly by Köhner and his overseers. The characters express their disdain for their situations and the oppressive jungle environment. Dr. Else continues to struggle with alcohol and begins to see hallucinations. Andrea and Podeley begin a relationship, but Podeley is later kept from leaving the plantation to join Andrea by Köhner on account of unsettled debts. Podeley later stages an escape with other laborers by ambushing a group of overseers. He isolates Köhner and drives him to the river, where he whips him and forces him to board a raft and leave the area. Köhner's body is later found downriver and the overseers regroup and search for Podeley, who goes into hiding.

Podeley sends a message to Andrea that she and her father should meet him so they can escape together. Andrea shares this with her father who accepts. The night before they are due to meet, Andrea leaves her room to investigate the noise of her drunken father at night. Dr. Else opens his door and because he is unable to make out the shape of his daughter, he strikes her with his cane, leading to her death shortly afterwards. The next day, Podeley is waiting for Andrea and her father, but instead is met by his friend who relays what has happened. He then sees Andrea's funeral procession. Distraught, Podeley runs out to reveal himself to the overseers in the procession and is shot. The film ends with Podeley grasping the loose dirt before letting go as he passes away.

== Cast ==
- Ángel Magaña as Esteban Podeley
- Elisa Galvé as Andrea Else (Chinita)
- Raúl De Lange as Dr. Else
- Francisco Petrone as Köhner
- Homero Cárpena as Podeley's friend
- Roberto Fugazot as orange distiller
- Pepito Petray
- Félix Tortorelli
- Manuel Villoldo

== Restoration ==
In 2019, the Museo del Cine of Argentina, with the support of Martin Scorsese's The Film Foundation and the laboratory of the Cineteca di Bologna, restored Prisoners of the Land from two 35mm prints of the film found both in Paris at the Cinémathèque Française and in Prague at the Czech Film Archive. The discovery of this two prints was crucial, due to the lack of a national cinematheque and protective cultural politics the original Argentine negative was lost during the last century, and the only copy left in the country was a degraded 16mm. Paula Felix-Didier, head of the Museo del Cine and principal responsibility of the restoration, said about the significance of this new copy: "This is a new possibility of seeing one of the fundamental films of the history of Argentine cinema again as it had been decades ago could not be seen, and once again having a deep heritage rescue to understand the history of Argentine cinema and its evolution".

This 2019 restoration was first shown at the Il Cinema Ritrovato Festival in Bologna and later, in December, it was first screened in Argentina at the MALBA, in Buenos Aires.
