= La Muerte está mintiendo =

- Directed by: Carlos F. Borcosque
- Release date: 1950
- Country: Argentina
- Language: Spanish

La Muerte está mintiendo is a 1950 film of the classical era of Argentine cinema.

== Cast ==
- Narciso Ibáñez Menta as Emilio Marín.
- María Rosa Gallo as Marta Ferrari.
- Alita Román as Carmen Noguera.
- Perla Mux as Isabel Pradas.
- Francisco Martínez Allende as Roberto Marín.
