= Anita Jordán =

Argentine film and stage actress

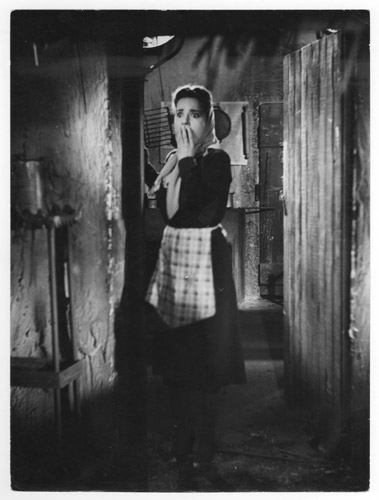
- Jordan in the 1940 film The Englishmen of the Bones
- Born: 1917; Santa Fe, Argentina
- Died: 20 March 1946 (aged 28–29); Argentina
- Occupation: Actress
- Years active: 1934 - 1944 (film)

Anita Jordán (1917-1946) was an Argentine film and stage actress.

== Selected filmography ==
- Only the Valiant (1940)
- The Englishman of the Bones (1940)

== Bibliography ==
- Goble, Alan. The Complete Index to Literary Sources in Film. Walter de Gruyter, 1999.
