= Marriage Italian Style =

1964 film by Vittorio De Sica

- Italian theatrical release poster
- Italian: Matrimonio all'italiana
- Directed by: Vittorio De Sica
- Screenplay by: Renato Castellani; Tonino Guerra; Leo Benvenuti; Piero De Bernardi
- Based on: Filumena Marturano by Eduardo De Filippo
- Produced by: Carlo Ponti
- Starring: Sophia Loren; Marcello Mastroianni; Aldo Puglisi; Tecla Scarano; Marilù Tolo
- Cinematography: Roberto Gerardi
- Edited by: Adriana Novelli
- Music by: Armando Trovajoli
- Production companies: Compagnia Cinematografica Champion; Les Films Concordia
- Distributed by: Interfilm (Italy); SNC (France)
- Release dates: 19 December 1964 (Italy); 30 December 1964 (France)
- Running time: 102 minutes
- Countries: Italy; France
- Languages: Italian; Neapolitan
- Box office: $3.7 million (Italy); $4.1 million (US and Canada rentals); $9.1 million (US and Canada)

Marriage Italian Style (Italian: Matrimonio all'italiana [matriˈmɔːnjo allitaˈljaːna]) is a 1964 romantic comedy-drama film directed by Vittorio De Sica, starring Sophia Loren and Marcello Mastroianni. The film was adapted by Leonardo Benvenuti, Renato Castellani, Piero De Bernardi, and Tonino Guerra from the play Filumena Marturano by Eduardo De Filippo. Filumena Marturano had previously been adapted as a 1950 Argentine film.

== Plot ==
Set during the World War II era, the film follows a cynical but successful 28-year-old businessman named Domenico (Mastroianni), who, after meeting a naive 17-year-old country girl, Filumena (Loren), during a bombing outside a Neapolitan brothel, starts an on-again, off-again relationship spanning 22 years. From the very beginning, Filumena is deeply in love with Domenico, but her love is not reciprocated. After Filumena expresses her wish to be solely his woman, Domenico arranges a leased home for her, with Rosalie as a maid and Alfredo (Aldo Puglisi) as the butler, and arranges a job for her in his shop. He eventually takes her into his house as a semi-official mistress under the pretence that she is the niece of Carmela (his mother's former maid) there to take care of his ailing, senile mother. Domenico's mindset about Filumena's past keeps him from taking their relationship seriously.

After falling for the 20-year-old cashier in his store, Domenico (now 50) plans to marry her; however, he finds himself cornered when Filumena feigns illness and, while "on her deathbed", asks him to marry her. Thinking she will be dead in a matter of hours and the marriage won't even be registered, he agrees. After being proclaimed his legal bride, the shrewd and resourceful Filumena drops the charade of feigning death. This sends Domenico into a fit of rage, as he feels that Filumena tricked him for his money. But Filumena reveals the real reason for the marriage: she did it for the three children she had borne (Umberto, Riccardo, and Michele). As the children were coming of age, she wanted them to have Domenico's family name.

Domenico won't accept this and decides to contest the marriage. The law rules in his favour, and the marriage is annulled. Filumena accepts the annulment but tells Domenico that he had fathered one of the children. She does not say which one, as she considers all of them equal. However, she gives him a hint that his child was conceived on the night Domenico had said "to pretend we are in love" and had given her a 100-lira note, on which she had written the date and kept it in a locket ever since. She gives the note to Domenico, having torn off the corner containing the date. Domenico is visibly rattled by this revelation but can't solve the clue.

Domenico tries desperately to figure out which child he had fathered. He visits the children at their workplaces and tries other means but hits a dead end. He meets up with Filumena and tries to force an answer out of her, but she reveals nothing more. As a last resort, Domenico decides to confront the children directly, but Filumena vehemently opposes this, as the prospect of Domenico's money would drive a wedge between the children. As Filumena and Domenico scuffle, they tumble down, fall into each other's arms, and passionately kiss. They then declare their love for each other and decide to (re)marry.

At the church, the boys wait, and Domenico arrives. Domenico mentions that, because he will be marrying their mother, he will give them his name. He continues to prod them for clues but again comes out with nothing, as they each share some of his traits. Filumena rushes in; Domenico, smiling with joy, tells her how wonderful she looks, and the marriage takes place. Back at home, the boys bid their mother goodnight. As, one after another, they say goodnight to Domenico calling him their father, he smiles broadly and says that he will see them tomorrow. Filumena sits and weeps with joy at this. When Domenico asks why she is crying, she states that it’s a wonderful day to cry.

== Cast ==
- Sophia Loren as Filumena Marturano
- Marcello Mastroianni as Domenico Soriano
- Aldo Puglisi as Alfredo
- Tecla Scarano as Rosalia
- Marilù Tolo as Diana
- Gianni Ridolfi as Umberto
- Generoso Cortini as Michele
- Vito Moricone as Riccardo
- Rita Piccione as Teresina, seamstress
- Lino Mattera
- Alfio Vita as pastry chef
- Alberto Castaldi as (credited as Alberto Gastaldi)
- Anna Santoro
- Enza Maggi as Lucia, maid
- Mara Marilli

== Reception ==
=== Box office ===
It was the second-highest-grossing Italian film in Italy for the year, behind only A Fistful of Dollars, with a gross of $3,725,000.

=== Critical response ===
The film was received favourably. Marriage Italian Style has an approval rating of 86% on review aggregator website Rotten Tomatoes, based on 7 reviews, and an average rating of 8/10. The New York Times noted that it was the fourth quality collaboration between director Vittorio De Sica and Sophia Loren, and the second to include Marcello Mastroianni in the mix, with the "warmup" for this movie having been 1963's Yesterday, Today and Tomorrow. The review described it as a "wonderfully flamboyant" film, and provided some context for the film, noting that Naples (at least in 1964) was "a quite unusual place, where the people are highly individual and may have bizarre relationships".

=== Awards and nominations ===
The film was nominated for two Academy Awards: Best Actress in a Leading Role (for Loren) in 1964 and Best Foreign Language Film in 1965. It was also entered in the 4th Moscow International Film Festival in 1965.

== See also ==
- List of submissions to the 38th Academy Awards for Best Foreign Language Film
- List of Italian submissions for the Academy Award for Best Foreign Language Film
