= The Gaucho Priest =

- Directed by: Lucas Demare
- Written by: Hugo Mac Dougall; Miguel Mileo
- Cinematography: Bob Roberts
- Edited by: Carlos Rinaldi
- Music by: Lucio Demare; Juan Ehlert
- Production company: Pampa Film
- Release date: 25 June 1941
- Running time: 82 minutes
- Country: Argentina
- Language: Spanish

The Gaucho Priest (Spanish: El cura gaucho) is a 1941 Argentine historical film of the Golden Age of Argentine cinema, directed by Lucas Demare and written by Hugo Mac Dougall and Miguel Mileo. The film's art direction was by Ralph Pappier.

== Cast ==
- Aída Alberti
- Graciliano Batista
- José Casamayor
- Homero Cárpena
- José De Angelis
- Salvador Lotito
- Mecha López
- Enrique Muiño
- René Múgica
- Horacio Priani
- Marino Seré
- Héctor Torres
- Eloy Álvarez

== Bibliography ==
- Rist, Peter H. Historical Dictionary of South American Cinema. Rowman & Littlefield, 2014.
