= Alejandra Da Passano =

Argentine actress

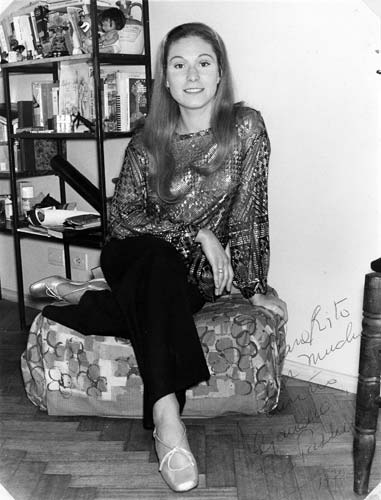
Alejandra Da Passano, date unknown

María Alejandra Ana Da Passano (26 July 1947 – 30 June 2014), better known as Alejandra Da Passano, was an Argentine actress of film, stage and television. Her best known films were El Señor Presidente (1970), Malevo (1972), and La Madre María (1974).

Da Passano was born in Buenos Aires to actors María Rosa Gallo and Camilo da Passano. Da Passano made her film debut in Pajarito Gómez (1964). Da Passano acted in film, television, and theater.

Da Passano was married to actor Rodolfo Ranni.

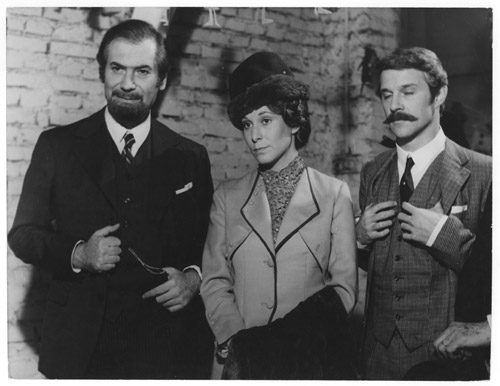
Arturo García Buhr, Alejandra Da Passano and Adrián Ghio in the film La Madre María (1974).

Da Passano died at the age of 66 in Buenos Aires. Da Passano is buried in Chacarita Cemetery.

== Other websites ==
- Alejandra Da Passano at IMDb
