= A Story of the Nineties =

- Directed by: Hugo del Carril
- Written by: Hugo del Carril
- Produced by: Ángel Zavalia; Hugo del Carril
- Starring: Hugo del Carril; Sabina Olmos; Santiago Arrieta; Guillermo Battaglia
- Cinematography: Bob Roberts
- Edited by: José Gallego
- Music by: Tito Ribero
- Production company: San Miguel Films
- Distributed by: Distribuidora Panamericana
- Release date: 19 May 1949
- Running time: 105 minutes
- Country: Argentina
- Language: Spanish

A Story of the Nineties (Spanish:Historia del 900) is a 1949 Argentine musical film of the classical era of Argentine cinema, written and directed by Hugo del Carril and starring himself, Sabina Olmos and Santiago Arrieta. The film marked del Carril's directorial debut. Set in the 1890s, it was one of a number of tango-influenced films produced in Argentina.

== Cast ==
- Hugo del Carril as Julián Acosta
- Sabina Olmos as María Cristina
- Santiago Arrieta as The Friend
- Guillermo Battaglia as 'Pardo' Márquez
- Angelina Pagano as The Mother
- José Olarra
- Sara Guasch as Rosa
- Florindo Ferrario
- Paquita Garzón
- Ubaldo Martinez
- Alberto Contreras
- Leticia Scury
- Vicente Álvarez
- Joaquín Petrocino
- Franca Boni
- Manuel Alcón
- Lily del Carril
- Ricardo Land

== Bibliography ==
- Rist, Peter H. Historical Dictionary of South American Cinema. Rowman & Littlefield, 2014.
