= José Ruzzo =

Argentine stage and film actor

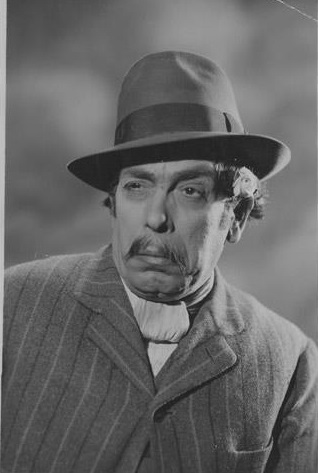
- Ruzzo in 1949.
- Occupation: Actor
- Years active: 1936–1967 (Film)

José Ruzzo was an Argentine stage and film actor.

== Biography ==
José Ruzzo was born in Buenos Aires, Argentina. He was character actor who appeared in more than thirty Argentine films over the course of his career, working alongside actors such as Mario Soffici, Hugo del Carril, Mecha Ortiz, Enrique Muiño, Jorge Salcedo, Julia Sandoval, Ricardo Galache, José María Gutiérrez, Elsa Daniel, Zully Moreno, Ángel Magaña, Orestes Caviglia, Malisa Zini, Margarita Corona, and Florindo Ferrario, among others.

== Selected filmography ==
- By the Light of a Star (1941)
- I Want to Die with You (1941)
- Son cartas de amor (1943)
- Gold in the Hand (1943)
- Savage Pampas (1945)
- Women's Refuge (1946)
- La Secta del trébol (1948)
- Los secretos del buzón (1948)
- The Goddess of Rio Beni (1950)
- The Unwanted (1951)
- Mercado de abasto (1955)

== Bibliography ==
- José Manuel Valdés Rodríguez. El cine en la Universidad de La Habana. Empresa de Publicaciones Mined, Unidad "André Voisin", 1966.
