= Para vestir santos (film) =

1955 film directed by Leopoldo Torre Nilsson

- Directed by: Leopoldo Torre Nilsson
- Written by: Sixto Pondal Ríos; Carlos Olivari
- Starring: Tita Merello; Jorge Salcedo; Tomás Simari; José de Ángelis; Myriam de Urquijo; Beatriz Taibo
- Cinematography: Alberto Etchebehere
- Edited by: Jorge Gárate
- Music by: Tito Ribero
- Production company: Argentina Sono Film
- Release date: 4 August 1955
- Running time: 78 minutes
- Country: Argentina
- Language: Spanish

Para vestir santos is a 1955 Argentine romantic drama film directed by Leopoldo Torre Nilsson, from a screenplay by Sixto Pondal Ríos and Carlos Olivari. It stars Tita Merello, Jorge Salcedo, Tomás Simari, José de Ángelis, Myriam de Urquijo and Beatriz Taibo.

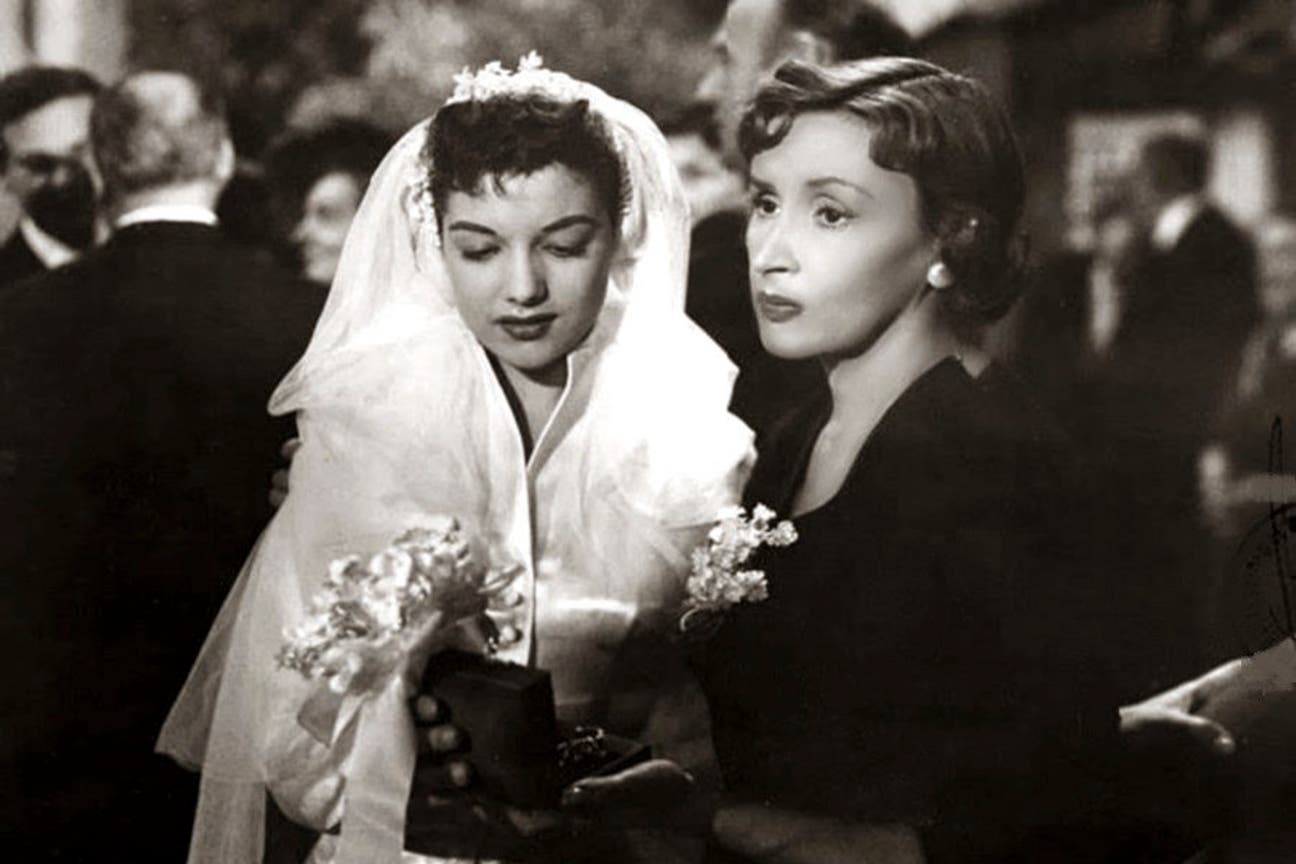
Beatriz Taibo and Tita Merello in the film.

== Cast ==
- Tita Merello as Martina Brizuela
- Jorge Salcedo as José Luis Ordóñez
- Tomás Simari as Don Aldo
- José de Ángelis
- Myriam de Urquijo
- Beatriz Taibo as Carlota Brizuela
- Frank Nelson as Pichín Brizuela
- Alba Mujica as Donata
