= Los Lobos del palmar =

- Directed by: Homero Cárpena
- Written by: Raúl Daniel Padilla
- Starring: Carlos Perelli; Ricardo de Rosas
- Edited by: Jacinto Cascales
- Release date: 1954
- Country: Argentina
- Language: Spanish

Los Lobos del palmar is a 1954 black-and-white Argentine film directed by Homero Cárpena.

== Cast ==
- Carlos Perelli
- Ricardo de Rosas
- Luis Abel Huce
- Mora Milton
- Enrique Alippi
- Aída Villadeamigo
- Fausto Etchegoin
