= La fuga (1937 film) =

1937 film

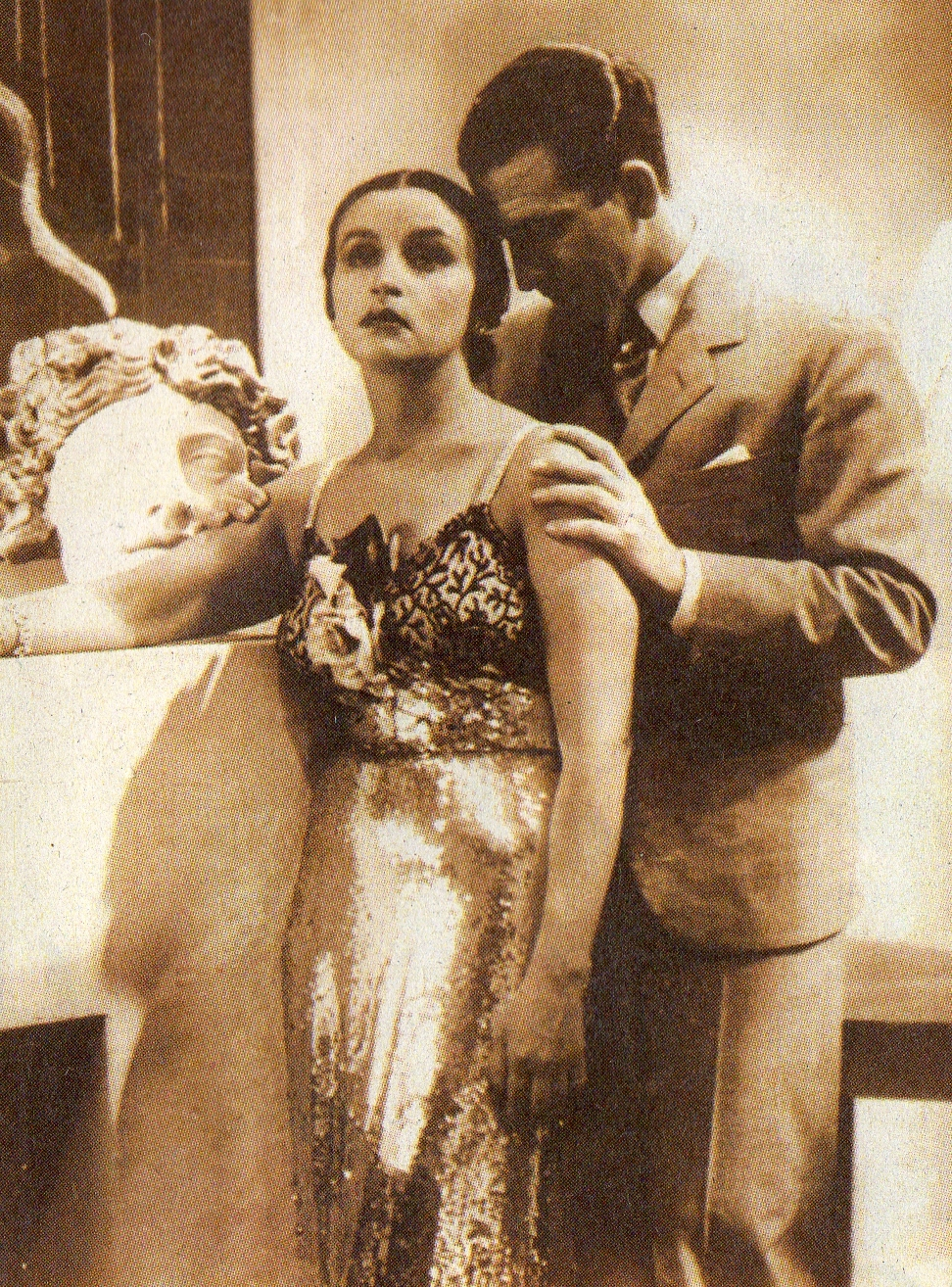
- Tita Merello and Francisco Petrone in La fuga
- Directed by: Luis Saslavsky
- Written by: Miguel Mileo; Alfredo G. Volpe
- Starring: Santiago Arrieta
- Cinematography: Gerhard Huttula
- Production company: Pampa Film
- Release date: 28 July 1937
- Running time: 92 minutes
- Country: Argentina
- Language: Spanish

La fuga is a 1937 Argentine drama film directed by Luis Saslavsky and starring Santiago Arrieta.

It is an emblematic film of the Golden Age of Argentine cinema. In a survey of the 100 greatest films of Argentine cinema carried out by the Museo del Cine Pablo Ducrós Hicken in 2000, the film reached the 32nd position.

== Cast ==
- Santiago Arrieta as Daniel
- Tita Merello as Cora
- Francisco Petrone as Robles
- Niní Gambier as Rosita
- María Santos as María Luisa
- Homero Cárpena as Don Onofrio
- Augusto Codecá as Sr. Pallejac
- Sebastián Chiola as Puentecito
- Amelia Bence as Sara
