= Strange Gods =

1958 film

- Directed by: Román Viñoly Barreto
- Written by: Hugo Moser
- Produced by: Luis Giudici
- Starring: Enrique Fava; Olga Zubarry
- Cinematography: Ricardo Younis
- Edited by: José Serra
- Release date: 1958
- Running time: 84 minutes
- Country: Argentina
- Language: Spanish

Strange Gods (original title, Los dioses ajenos) is a 1958 Argentine film directed by Román Viñoly Barreto and starring Enrique Fava and Olga Zubarry. It was entered into the 8th Berlin International Film Festival.

== Cast ==
- Enrique Fava
- Olga Zubarry
