= María Santos =

Argentine actress

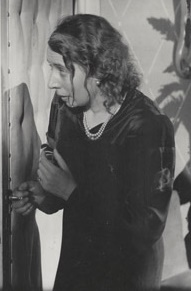
María Santos

María Santos was an Argentine actress. In 1943, she starred in Benito Perojo's Stella. Other notable roles include: Maestro Levita (1938), La fuga (1937) and La serpiente de cascabel (1948).

== Selected filmography ==
- La fuga (1937)
- Melodies of America (1941)
- Seven Women (1944)
- Lauracha (1946)
- Story of a Bad Woman (1948)
- The Trap (1949)
