= Los Isleros =

Los isleros
- Theatrical release poster
- Directed by: Lucas Demare
- Written by: Ernesto L. Castro; Lucas Demare
- Starring: Tita Merello
- Cinematography: Mario Pagés
- Edited by: José Cañizares
- Production company: Estudios San Miguel
- Release date: 1951
- Running time: 112 minutes
- Country: Argentina
- Language: Spanish

Los isleros is a 1951 Argentine film directed by Lucas Demare, during the classical era of Argentine cinema. It was entered into the 1951 Cannes Film Festival. It won the Silver Condor Award for Best Film.

It was selected as the seventh greatest Argentine film of all time in a poll conducted by the Museo del Cine Pablo Ducrós Hicken in 1984, while it ranked 11th in the 2000 edition. In a new version of the survey organized in 2022 by the specialized magazines La vida util, Taipei and La tierra quema, presented at the Mar del Plata International Film Festival, the film reached the 49 position.

== Cast ==
- Tita Merello
- Arturo García Buhr
- Roberto Fugazot
- Enrique Fava
- Graciela Lecube
- Alita Román
- Cayetano Biondo
- José Cañizares
- Max Citelli
- Lucas Demare
- Aurelia Ferrer
- Salvador Fortuna
- Mecha López
- Luis Otero
- Mario Passano
- Matilde Rivera
- Orestes Soriani
