= I Want to Die with You =

Yo quiero morir contigo
- Directed by: Mario Soffici
- Written by: Enrique Amorim; Ramón Gómez Macía
- Cinematography: Pablo Tabernero
- Edited by: Carlos Rinaldi
- Music by: Lucio Demare
- Production company: Pampa Film
- Release date: 1941
- Running time: 92 minutes
- Country: Argentina
- Language: Spanish

I Want to Die with You or Yo quiero morir contigo is a 1941 Argentine screwball comedy film directed by Mario Soffici during the Golden Age of Argentine cinema.

== Plot ==
Ángel Magaña and Elisa Galvé play a constantly bickering young couple who draw up a suicide pact and prepare to kill themselves. However they are constantly interrupted by surprises, particularly the timely arrival of a dying gangster, who gives them $30,000 worth of ill goods.

== Cast ==
- Ángel Magaña
- Elisa Galvé
- José Olarra
- Carlos Perelli
- Federico Mansilla
- Ilde Pirovano
- Héctor Ugazzio
- Vicky Astory
- Julio Magaña
- Gogó Andreu
- Alfredo Mileo
- José Ruzzo
- Miguel Coiro
- Adela Velich
