= Chingolo =

- Directed by: Lucas Demare
- Written by: Carlos A. Olivari; Nicolas Olivari; Sixto Pondal Ríos
- Cinematography: Gumer Barreiros
- Edited by: Carlos Rinaldi
- Production company: Pampa Film
- Release date: 1940
- Running time: 79 minute
- Country: Argentina
- Language: Spanish

Chingolo is a 1940 Argentine film of the Golden Age of Argentine cinema.

== Cast ==
- Luis Sandrini as Chingolo
- Nuri Montsé as Elvira
- Homero Cárpena as Carbonillo
- Rosa Catá as Leocadia
- Cirilo Etulain as Fernando
- Haydeé Larroca
- Carlos Morganti
