= La Boda (1964 film) =

1964 film

- Release date: 1964
- Running time: 88 minute
- Country: Argentina
- Language: Spanish

La Boda is a 1964 Argentine film directed by Lucas Demare from the novel by Ángel María de Lera. It depicts Luciano, a middle-aged social outcast who has made his fortune in the slave trade, and his efforts to woo the young and beautiful Iluminades and win over her parents and other townspeople with his money.

== Cast ==
- Manuel Alexandre
- Mercedes Barranco
- Conchita Bautista
