= Story of a Bad Woman =

1948 film

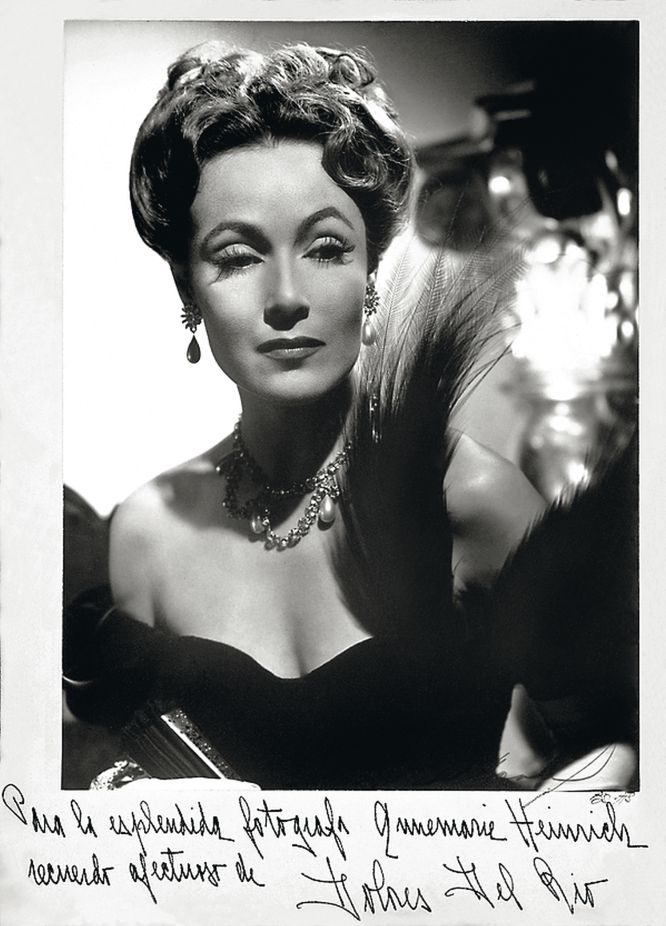
- Dolores del Río (Mrs. Erlynne) by Annemarie Heinrich, 1948
- Directed by: Luis Saslavsky
- Written by: Ariel Cortazzo; Pedro Miguel Obligado; Luis Saslavsky
- Based on: Lady Windermere's Fan by Oscar Wilde
- Starring: Dolores del Río; María Duval; Alberto Closas; Bertha Moss
- Cinematography: Alberto Etchebehere
- Edited by: Jorge Gárate
- Music by: Victor Slister
- Production company: Argentina Sono Film
- Distributed by: Argentina Sono Film
- Release date: 18 May 1948
- Running time: 93 minutes
- Country: Argentina
- Language: Spanish

Story of a Bad Woman (Spanish: Historia de una mala mujer) is a 1948 Argentine drama film of the classical era of Argentine cinema, directed by Luis Saslavsky and starring the Mexican superstar Dolores del Río, María Duval, and Alberto Closas. It is based on the 1892 Oscar Wilde play Lady Windermere's Fan. The film's art direction was by Raúl Soldi. It was made by Argentina Sono Film, one of the country's biggest studios during the era.

== Cast ==
- Dolores del Río as Mrs. Erlynne
- María Duval
- Alberto Closas
- Fernando Lamas
- Amalia Sánchez Ariño
- Homero Cárpena
- María Santos
- Bertha Moss
- Ricardo Castro Ríos
- Luis Otero
- Amalia Bernabé
- Francisco de Paula
- Roberto Bordoni
- Aurelia Ferrer
- Berta Ortegosa
- Alberto de Mendoza
- Iris Martorell
- Manuel Alcón
- Diana Montes
- Pablo Cumo

== Bibliography ==
- Hall, Linda. Dolores del Río: Beauty in Light and Shade. Stanford University Press, 2013.
