= Filumena Marturano =

1946 stage play

Filumena
- Written by: Eduardo De Filippo
- Original language: Italian; Neapolitan
- Subject: After 35 years living together, Filumena is to be thrown over for a younger woman; pretense of death cures all
- Genre: Comedy
- Setting: Domenico Soriano's house in Naples, Italy

Premiere
- Date premiered: 1946
- Place premiered: Naples

Filumena Marturano (Neapolitan: [filuˈmɛːnə martuˈrɑːnə], Italian: [filuˈmɛːna martuˈraːno]), sometimes performed in English as The Best House in Naples, is a play written in 1946 by Italian playwright, actor and poet Eduardo De Filippo. It is the basis for the 1950 Spanish-language Argentine musical film Filomena Marturano, multiple Italian adaptations under its original title, and the 1964 film Marriage Italian Style.

== Plot ==
The curtain opens on Domenico Soriano, 50, a wealthy Neapolitan shop-keeper who is raging against Filumena, 48, a former prostitute. They have lived together for many years (but with him frequently having trysts with other women). Now, when he was intending to marry the younger Diana, Filumena has tricked him into marrying her instead: she pretended to be dying, and so coaxed him into a marriage in articulo mortis, but as soon as they were married she sprang up from her bed to send away Diana, whom Domenico had disguised as a nurse to have her nearby. Filumena reveals her reason for wanting to be Domenico's wife: she wants him to legitimise her three sons (Umberto, Michele and Riccardo) who have grown up in foster care and have no idea of who their mother is.

Domenico is not going to have any of this, and briefs his lawyer Nocella to have the marriage declared null and void. When the lawyer explains to Filumena that he'll easily win the case, she accepts the failure of her ruse, but tells Domenico that one of the three young men is actually his child, then leaves him. Ten months later, with all his attempts to find out which of the three young men is his son having failed, Domenico remarries Filumena, accepting all three as his sons.

In the play, Filumena memorably tells Domenico that "children are children, and they're all equal" (I figli sono figli e sono tutti uguali).

== Productions ==
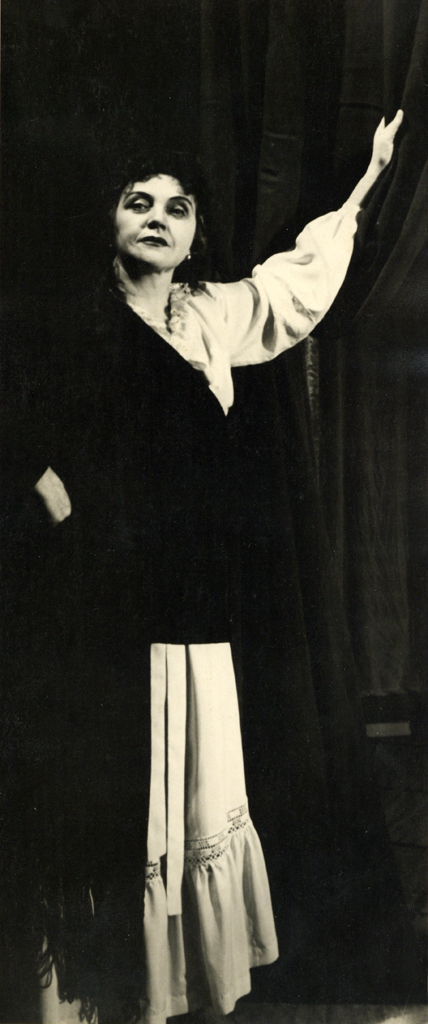
Mira Danilova as Filomena Marturano in a 1955 play by Ljubljana City Theatre

Filumena Marturano initially was written as a tribute to Eduardo's sister Titina De Filippo, a famous Neapolitan theatrical actress, who took the title role in the first production in Naples in 1946. The play followed the success of Napoli milionaria, which Eduardo had written and which had premiered the year before to general acclaim. However, the first night of the new play proved a disappointment and received lukewarm notices from the Neapolitan theatre-going public. Titina decided to address this by following her own instincts and performing as she felt the role required. She was proved right. The play achieved great success, so great in fact that for many years afterwards Titina was called Filumena in Italy rather than her own.

Thanks to an arrangement made by Carlo Trabucco, the editor of the daily Italian Christian Democrat newspaper Il Popolo, an audience was arranged for the cast to meet Pope Pius XII in a private audience in the Vatican. At the audience, the pope unexpectedly asked to hear one of the monologues, and Titina recited for him the prayer of Filumena to the Madonna of the Roses.

Despite the strong connection between Titina De Filippo and the role in the mind of the Italian public, another actress, Regina Bianchi, was able to achieve cult status as Filumena in subsequent years.

In 1977, an English-language translation by Keith Waterhouse and Willis Hall was produced at the Lyric Theatre in London, directed by Franco Zeffirelli and starring Colin Blakely and Joan Plowright. This won The London Theatres Comedy of the year award in 1978. The production was taken to New York City, where it opened on 10 February 1980 at the St. James Theatre on Broadway where it ran for 32 performances. Before the New York transfer, it had a run in Baltimore where it was directed by Laurence Olivier (husband of Joan Plowright).

The play was performed at the Piccadilly Theatre, London, opening on 30 September 1998 and running until 27 February 1999. It was directed by Peter Hall with Judi Dench in the title role. Michael Pennington played Domenico.

== Film adaptations ==
In 1950, Eduardo De Filippo directed Filomena Marturano, an Argentine, Spanish-language film of the play, in which he starred as Domenico alongside his sister Titina. They also co-starred in the 1951 Italian film Filumina Marturano, again directed by De Filippo, although Ms. De Filippo received no screen credit. He also made a TV version in 1962, in which Regina Bianchi played the title role.

In 1964, another screen version was directed by Vittorio De Sica, titled Matrimonio all'italiana (Marriage Italian Style), starring Sophia Loren and Marcello Mastroianni. It was nominated for several international awards, winning the Golden Globe Award for Best Foreign Language Film.

In 2010 Italian television, RAI Uno, made a miniseries starring Massimo Ranieri as Domenico and Mariangela Melato as Filumena.
