= Argentino hasta la muerte =

- Directed by: Fernando Ayala
- Written by: Fernando Ayala, Félix Luna
- Produced by: Fernando Ayala, Héctor Olivera
- Starring: Héctor Alterio, Arnaldo André, Thelma Biral, Rey Charol
- Cinematography: Victor Hugo Caula
- Edited by: Oscar Montauti
- Music by: Óscar Cardozo Ocampo
- Release date: 6 May 1971
- Running time: 120 minutes
- Country: Argentina
- Language: Spanish

Argentino hasta la muerte (English language: Argentine Until Death) is a 1971 Argentine war film set during the Paraguayan War (1864-1870), directed by Fernando Ayala, who wrote it along with Félix Luna. The film premiered on 6 May 1971 in Buenos Aires.

== Cast ==
- Héctor Alterio
- Arnaldo André
- Thelma Biral
- Rey Charol
- Héctor da Rosa
- Gabriela Gili
- José María Gutiérrez
- Susana Lanteri
- Víctor Laplace
- Leonor Manso
- José Luis Mazza
- Eduardo Muñoz
- Lautaro Murúa
- Roberto Rimoldi Fraga
- Martha Roldán
- Fernando Siro
- Walter Soubrie
- María Valenzuela (as María del Carmen Valenzuela)
- Myriam Van Wessen
- Fernando Vegal
- Jorge Villalba
