= Amorina (film) =

1961 film

- Directed by: Hugo del Carril
- Written by: César Tiempo; Eduardo Borrás (play)
- Starring: Tita Merello; Hugo del Carril
- Cinematography: Ignacio Souto
- Distributed by: Argentina Sono Film
- Release date: 6 April 1961
- Running time: 90 minutes
- Country: Argentina
- Language: Spanish

Amorina (aka Amor atormentado) is a 1961 Argentine black and white film directed by Hugo del Carril and written by César Tiempo. It is based on a play by Eduardo Borrás. It stars Hugo del Carril and Tita Merello.

The film is a drama about marital infidelity. It premièred in Argentina on 6 April 1961 and the film and the performances of del Carill and Merello were well received by critics.

== Cast ==
- Tita Merello - Amorina
- Hugo del Carril - Humberto
- María Aurelia Bisutti - Humberto's lover
- Alberto Bello - The Pshychoanalyst
- Golde Flami - Amorina's sister
- Alicia Paz - The daughter
- Rodolfo Ranni - The son
- Juan Carlos Palma -
- Orestes Soriani -
- Walter Reyna -
- Mercedes Román -
