= Filomena Marturano =

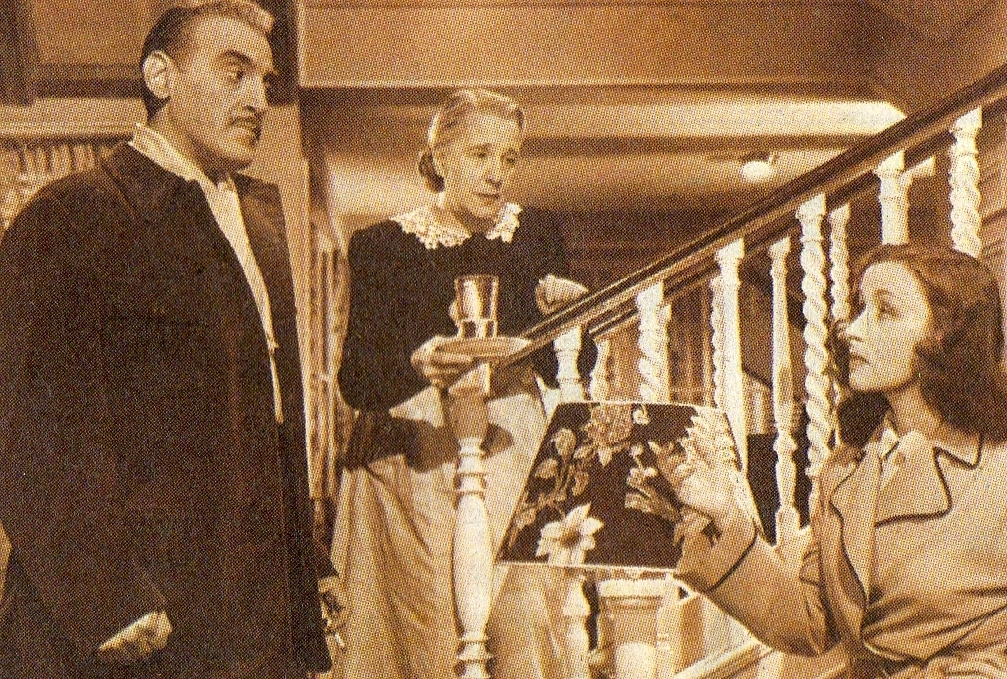
- Guillermo Battaglia, Gloria Ferrandiz, and Tita Merello in the film.
- Directed by: Luis Mottura
- Written by: Ariel Cortazzo; Eduardo De Filippo; María Cruz Regás; María Luz Regás
- Starring: Tita Merello; Guillermo Battaglia; Gloria Ferrandiz Alberto de Mendoza; Tito Alonso; Domingo Márquez Agustín Barrios; Lía Casanova; Luis Hector San Juan; Aída Villadeamigo
- Cinematography: Ricardo Younis
- Edited by: A. Rampoldi
- Music by: George Andreani
- Release date: January 20, 1950 (Argentina)
- Running time: 85 minutes
- Country: Argentina
- Language: Spanish

Filomena Marturano is a 1950 Argentine musical film directed by Luis Mottura. A production of the classical era of Argentine cinema, it is based on the theatrical piece Filumena Marturano by the Neapolitan actor and author Eduardo De Filippo, which had been previously performed in Argentina with great success by the company of Tita Merello. It was adapted by Ariel Cortazzo and María Cruz Regás. It starred Tita Merello, again, and Guillermo Battaglia.

Costumes were designed by Héctor Fernández Gómez.

The film was remade in 1964 as the Italian film Marriage Italian Style (Matrimonio all'italiana).

== Reception ==
The film is remembered for offering to Merello what is considered one of her best film roles.

It was also noted for its focus on biological and fictional paternity and the strong resonance of the theme in Argentinian society.
