= Leticia Scury =

Argentine actress

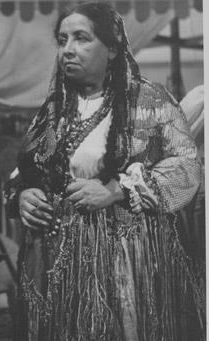
Scury in 1947

Leticia Scury, also spelled Leticia Scuri, (c. 1890 – 27 April 1950) was an Argentine actress. In 1928 she joined the Compañía Dramática de la “Casa del Arte”in Montevideo, Uruguay. She entered film in 1938 in Mario Soffici's Kilómetro 111 (1938). At the 1944 Argentine Film Critics Association Awards she won the Silver Condor Award for Best Supporting Actress for her performance in the drama Three Men of the River. Other films include The Gaucho War (1942), Todo un hombre (1943), Albergue de mujeres (1946) and Arrabalera (1950).

== Filmography ==
- Kilómetro 111 (1938)
- Héroes sin fama (1940)
- El tercer beso (1942)
- La guerra gaucha (1942)
- Tres hombres del río (1943)
- Todo un hombre (1943)
- Valle negro (1943)
- Pachamama (1944)
- Wake Up to Life (1945)
- Rosa de América (1946)
- Albergue de mujeres (1946)
- Una mujer sin cabeza (1947)
- Vacaciones (1947) .... Filomena
- Tierra del Fuego (1948)
- El tambor de Tacuarí (1948)
- My Poor Beloved Mother (1948)
- A Story of the Nineties (1949)
- Vidalita (1949)
- Arrabalera (1950)
