= Women's Refuge (film) =

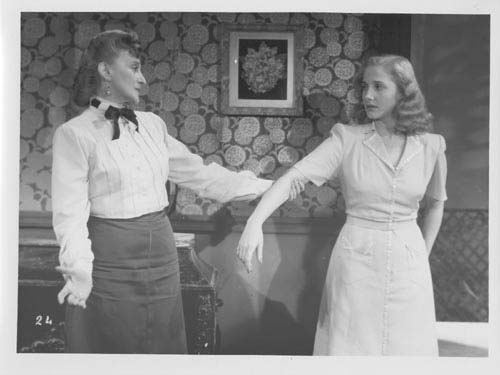
- Screen shot of 1946 Argentine film Women's Refuge (Albergue de mujeres)
- Directed by: Arturo S. Mom
- Written by: Arturo S. Mom; Emilio Villalba Welsh
- Produced by: Arturo S. Mom
- Starring: Aída Alberti; Orestes Caviglia
- Cinematography: Roque Funes
- Edited by: José Cardella
- Music by: Alejandro Gutiérrez del Barrio
- Release date: 16 August 1946
- Running time: 87 minutes
- Country: Argentina
- Language: Spanish

Women's Refuge (Spanish: Albergue de Mujeres) is a 1946 Argentine film of the classical era of Argentine cinema, directed and written by Arturo S. Mom with the script written by Emilio Villalba Welsh. The film starred Aída Alberti and Orestes Caviglia, and Bertha Moss. The film is centred on women with feminist themes.

== Cast ==
In alphabetical order:

- Aída Alberti
- Orestes Caviglia
- Milagros de la Vega
- Golde Flami
- María Rosa Gallo
- Bertha Moss
- Horacio Priani
- Lydia Quintana
- José Ruzzo
- Leticia Scury
- Marino Seré

== Release ==
The film premiered on 16 August 1946.
