= Cecilio Madanes =

Argentinian theater director

Cecilio Madanes (Ukraine, 2 December 1921 - Buenos Aires, Argentina, 1 April 2000) was a Ukrainian theater director, set designer, and producer. He was one of the leading figures in Argentine theatre from 1950 through 1960. Madanes founded the Teatro Caminito.

Madanes studied Fine Arts at the Prilidiano Pueyrredón school. In 1947, he received a scholarship to France to continue his theater studies in Paris. When the scholarship ended eight months later, Madanes settled in France for eight years, where he met Jean Cocteau and Georges Braque, and studied at the Conservatoire national supérieur d'art dramatique in Paris with Louis Jouvet.

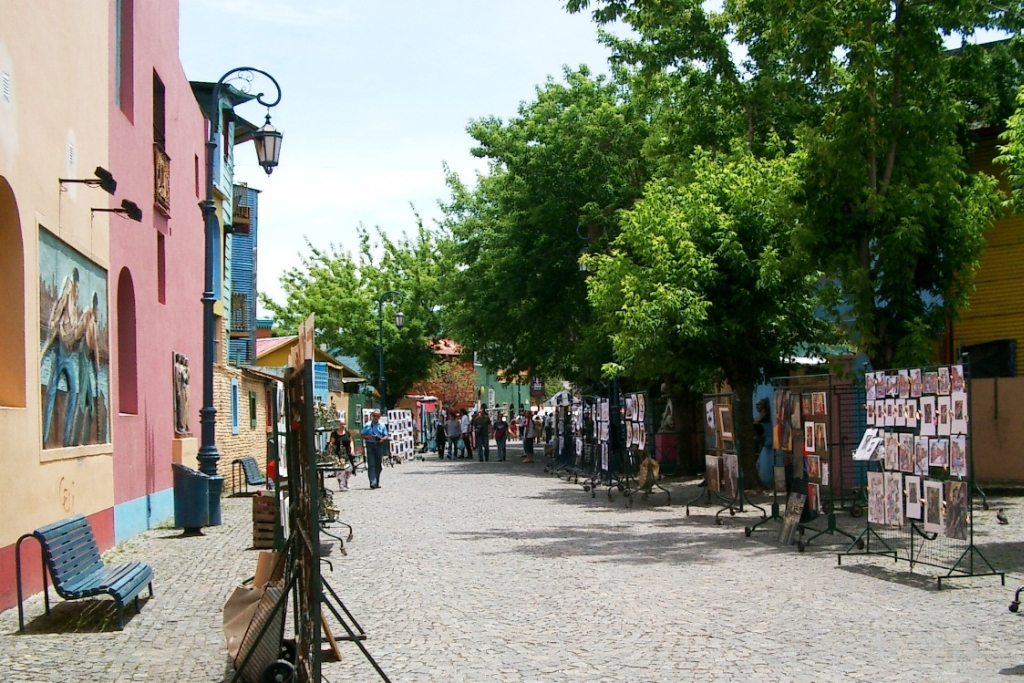
Theater Caminito

In 1957, Madanes created "theater Caminito", a street theater experience in the neighborhood of La Boca, Buenos Aires, and it lasted until 1973. The theater featured the works of Shakespeare, Molière, and García Lorca, among others, with the participation of leading Argentine actors such as Aida Luz and Beatriz Bonnet. He also worked in television on Channel 7, where he became responsible for overall programming.

He directed several plays including Estrellas en el Avenida in 1961, starring Tita Merello, Tato Bores, Hugo del Carril, and María Antinea; Amadeus and Las relaciones peligrosas with Oscar Martinez and Cecilia Roth; and Equus, which launched the career of Miguel Angel Sola. In the period between 1983 and 1986, he was director of the Teatro Colón. In 1984, he starred in the film Camila, which was nominated for an Oscar).

Madanes died in 2000 of leukemia.

== Selected works ==
=== Theatre ===
- 1957 Los chismes de las mujeres by Carlo Goldoni, Teatro Caminito.
- 1958 La zapatera prodigiosa by Federico García Lorca, Teatro Caminito.
- 1960 Así es la vida by Malfatti, Teatro Odeón.
- 1961 Las picardías de Scapin by Molière, Teatro Caminito.
- 1961 Estrellas en el Avenida with Tita Merello, Hugo del Carril and others.
- 1962-63 Las de barranco by Gregorio de Laferrere, Teatro Caminito.
- 1964-65 La pérgola de las flores by O.Flores, Teatro Caminito/Teatro Avenida.
- 1964 Los millones de Orofino by Eduardo Labiche, Teatro Caminito/Teatro Municipal Gral.San Martín.
- 1965-66 Una viuda difícil by Conrado Nalé Roxlo, Teatro Caminito.
- 1969-70 Sueño de una noche de verano by William Shakespeare, version of Manuel Mujica Láinez and Guillermo Whitelow.
- 1974 Locos de verano by Gregorio de Laferrere, Teatro Nacional Cervantes.
- 1976 and 1979 Equus by Peter Shaeffer with Duilio Marzio and Miguel Ángel Solá.
- 1976 Anillos para una dama by Antonio Gala with Nati Mistral.
- 1980 Doña Rosita la soltera by García Lorca con Thelma Biral.
- 1983 Amadeus by Peter Shaffer with Carlos Muñoz, Oscar Martínez and Leonor Manso, Teatro Liceo.
- 1995 Las amistades peligrosas by Choderlos de Laclos with Oscar Martínez and Cecilia Roth.

=== Opera and zarzuela ===
- 1965 La Traviata by Giuseppe Verdi with Anna Moffo, Teatro Colón.
- 1966 Manon Lescaut by Giacomo Puccini with Montserrat Caballé and Richard Tucker, Teatro Colón.
- 1966 La verbena de la Paloma by Tomás Bretón, Teatro Avenida.
- 1968 La zapatera prodigiosa by Juan José Castro, Teatro Colón.
- 1974 Juana de Arco en la hoguera by Arthur Honegger, Teatro Colón.
- 1974 Die Fledermaus (El murciélago) by Johann Strauss, Teatro Colón.
- 1975 Luisa Fernanda by Moreno Torroba, Teatro Avenida / Teatro Colón.
- 1981 Romeo et Juliette by Charles Gounod, Teatro Colón.
- 1992 Falstaff by Giuseppe Verdi, Teatro Colón.

== See also ==
- List of theatre directors in the 20th and 21st centuries
