= Rey Charol =

Uruguayan film and television actor

- Born: Lázaro Pedraíta García; 1936; Uruguay
- Years active: 1960- 1987

Lázaro Pedraíta García, best known as Rey Charol (1936–1990) was an Uruguayan film and television actor of African descent. Best known for his role as Cirilo Tamayo's father in "Jacinta Pichimahuida" and "Señorita maestra" TV series, he entered Argentina's film industry in 1960 and made some twenty appearances in film between then and 1987.

== Filmography ==
- Me sobra un marido (I have a spare husband, 1987)
- Patolandia nuclear (Nuclear Duckland, 1978)
- Así es la vida (That's the way life is, 1977) as Rosendo the policeman.
- Las aventuras de Pikín (The adventures of Pikín, 1977)
- La guerra de los sostenes (War of the Brassieres, 1976)
- Furia en la isla (Fury in the island,1976) as singer
- El muerto (The dead, 1975)
- Operación Guante Verde (Green Glove Operation, 1974)
- La Madre María (Mother Mary, 1974)
- La gran aventura (The great adventure, 1974) as Ruiz.
- Argentino hasta la muerte (Argentinian until I die, 1971)
- Muchacho que vas cantando (Boy who sing as you walk, 1971)
- Un elefante color ilusión (An illusion-coloured elephant, 1970)
- El sátiro (The pervert, 1970) as Charol.
- Kuma Ching (1969) as taxi driver.
- Corazón contento (Happy heart, 1969)
- Extraña ternura (Strange tenderness, 1964) as Alí.
- La fin del mundo (The end of the world, 1961)
- Testigo para un crimen (Witness of a crime, 1961)
- Luna Park (Luna Park, 1960)
