= Enrique Fava =

Argentine actor (1920–1994)

- Born: 1920; Puerto Deseado, Argentina
- Died: 13 June 1994 (aged 73–74); Buenos Aires, Argentina
- Occupation: Actor
- Years active: 1948–1986

Enrique Fava (1920 – 13 June 1994) was an Argentine actor. He appeared in 32 films and television shows between 1948 and 1986. He starred in the film Los dioses ajenos, which was entered into the 8th Berlin International Film Festival.

== Selected filmography ==
- The Honourable Tenant (1951)
- Los Isleros (1951)
- The Tunnel (1952)
- El Vampiro negro (1953)
- Los dioses ajenos (1958)
- Sugar Harvest (1958)
- That Forward Center Died at Dawn (1961)
- The Innocents (1963)
- El Ayudante (1971)
