= La Morocha =

- Directed by: Ralph Pappier
- Written by: Sixto Pondal Ríos; Carlos Olivari
- Cinematography: Francis Boeniger
- Music by: Tito Ribero
- Release date: 1958
- Running time: 91 minute
- Country: Argentina
- Language: Spanish

La Morocha is a 1958 Argentine film, which was actually filmed in 1955. Due to the military coup d'état which ended the presidency of Juan Perón, the film was not released until 1958. The film is in black and white, directed by Ralph Pappier and written by Sixto Pondal Ríos and Carlos Olivari and the premier date was on 30 January 1958. The stars were Tita Merello, Alfredo Alcón, Luis Arata y Rolando Chávez. This was the last film of Luis Arata.

== Synopsis ==
A prostitute girl helps a student to finish school even though he has a greedy uncle.

== Cast ==
- Tita Merello
- Alfredo Alcón
- Luis Arata
- Rolando Chávez
- Héctor Calcaño
- Yuki Nambá
- Carlos Barbetti
- Fernando Salas
- Eduardo de Labar
- Miguel Dante
- Nicolás Taricano
- Cayetano Biondo
- Diego Marcote
- Alberto Quiles
- Armando Lopardo
- Raquel Cariboni
- Aurelia Ferrer
- Susana Vargas
- Julio Bianquet
- Rafael Diserio
- Francisco Iriarte
- Teresa Blasco
- Mercedes Llambí
