= The Old Skinflint =

- Directed by: Lucas Demare
- Written by: Carlos Damel, Camilo Darthés
- Starring: Enrique Muiño, Francisco Petrone, Nuri Montsé
- Release date: 29 April 1942
- Running time: 90 min
- Country: Argentina
- Language: Spanish

The Old Skinflint (Spanish: El Viejo Hucha) is a 1942 Argentine film of the Golden Age of Argentine cinema.
