= El Hijo del barrio =

- Directed by: Lucas Demare
- Written by: Claudio Martínez Payva
- Produced by: Pampa Films
- Starring: Herminia Mancini, Roberto Fugazot, Fanny Navarro
- Cinematography: Pablo TAbernero
- Edited by: Carlos Rinaldi
- Release date: 29 February 1940
- Running time: 80 minutes
- Country: Argentina
- Language: Spanish

El Hijo del barrio is a 1940 Argentine comedy film directed by Lucas Demare during the Golden Age of Argentine cinema.
