= Fears (film) =

- Spanish: Los Miedos
- Directed by: Alejandro Doria
- Release date: 1980
- Running time: 99 minute
- Country: Argentina
- Language: Spanish

Fears (Spanish: Los Miedos) is an Argentine horror film shot in Eastmancolor, released on August 14, 1980. It was directed by Alejandro Doria and written by Alejandro Doria and Juan Carlos Cernadas Lamadrid. The film stars renowned actress Tita Merello in the lead role, with Soledad Silveyra, Miguel Ángel Solá, Sandra Mihanovich, Aníbal Morixe, and Lito González in supporting roles. It also features a special performance by María Leal. The movie includes outdoor scenes filmed in Comodoro Rivadavia, Gaiman, Puerto Madryn, Rawson, Sarmiento, and Trelew in the province of Chubut.

== Plot summary ==
An elderly woman, a killer, a pregnant woman, a soccer player, a mentally disabled person, and a prostitute escape from a plague and head south.

== Cast ==
- Tita Merello
- Soledad Silveyra
- Miguel Ángel Solá
- Sandra Mihanovich
- Aníbal Morixe
- Lito González
- María Leal
- Pablo Brichta
- Silvia Fernández Vita
- María Pla
- Jorge Ferrero
- Agustín Barrilli

== Reception ==
Fernando Masllorens commented in Convicción: "Does the film reach the viewer with this universal sense? Only partially, since the fantastic treatment at the beginning is limited to the specific problem of the pregnant woman, and the final sequence is purely realistic."

Alfredo Andrés wrote in La Razón: "Doria has crafted a story as concise as it is expressive."

Manrupe and Portela wrote: "An apocalyptic parable with good performances but excessively drawn out."
