= Lucas Demare =

Argentine film director, screenwriter and film producer

- Born: July 14, 1910; Buenos Aires, Argentina
- Died: September 6, 1981 (aged 71); Buenos Aires, Argentina
- Occupations: Film director, screenwriter, Film producer
- Years active: 1938-1977

Lucas Demare (July 14, 1910 – September 6, 1981) was an Argentine film director, screenwriter, and film producer notable for his work during the classical era of Argentine cinema and beyond.

== Biography ==
At the 1943 Argentine Film Critics Association Awards, Demare won Silver Condor awards for Best Director, Best Film and numerous other awards for The Gaucho War (1942), a film which is considered by critics in Argentina to be one of the best films in its history. He won further awards including Best Film and Director for Su mejor alumno (1944) at the 1945 Argentine Film Critics Association Awards. He wrote and directed other films such as El cura gaucho (1941), La calle grita (1948), Mi noche triste (1951), Zafra (1958) and La Boda (1964). His last film as a director was Hombres de mar in 1977. In 1964, he was a member of the jury at the 14th Berlin International Film Festival. He died of a heart attack at the age of 71 in 1981.

His brother was the composer Lucio Demare who wrote several film scores for Lucas' productions.

== Filmography as director ==
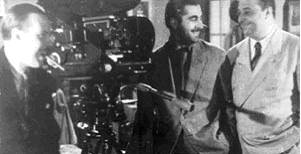
Lucas Demare between the screenwriters Homero Manzi (right) and Ulyses Petit de Murat (1942)

- Dos amigos y un amor (1938)
- 24 horas en libertad (1939)
- Corazón de turco (1940)
- El Hijo del barrio (1940)
- Chingolo (1940)
- The Gaucho Priest (1941)
- El Viejo Hucha (1942)
- The Gaucho War (1942)
- His Best Student (1944)
- Savage Pampas (1945)
- Nunca te diré adiós (1947)
- Como tú lo soñaste (1947)
- La Calle grita (1948)
- La Culpa la tuvo el otro (1950)
- Mi noche triste (1951)
- Los Isleros (1951)
- Payaso (1952)
- Un guapo del 900 (1952)
- The Seducer of Granada (1953)
- Guacho (1954)
- Mercado de abasto (1955)
- Después del silencio (1956)
- Sangre y acero (1956)
- El Último perro (1956)
- Zafra (1958)
- Behind a Long Wall (1958)
- Mi esqueleto (1959)
- Plaza Huincul (Pozo Uno) (1960)
- Thirst (1960)
- Italia di notte n. 1 (1964)
- La Boda (1964)
- Los Guerrilleros (1965)
- Sentencia para un traidor (1967)
- La Cigarra está que arde (1967)
- Rutas para la Mesopotamia (1968)
- Humo de Marihuana (1968)
- Pájaro loco (1971)
- La Madre María (1974)
- Solamente ella (1975)
- Hombres de Mar (1977)
