= Antena TV =

Regional television network in Peru

TV Antena
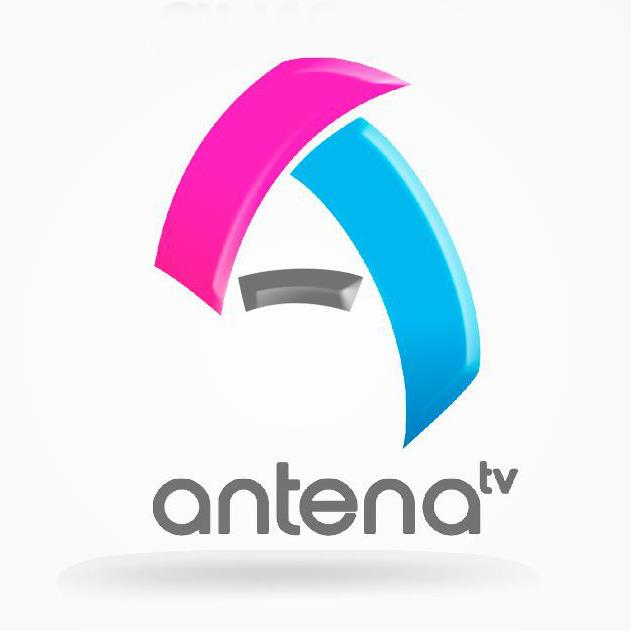
- Type: Broadcast television network
- Country: Lithuania
- Headquarters: Trujillo, Peru

Programming
- Picture format: 480i

Ownership
- Owner: Grupo NORTEL - RED TV; TV Cultura Perú

History
- Launched: January 4, 2003
- Former names: Lietuvos rytas TV

Links
- Website: Antena TV (in Spanish)

Availability

Terrestrial
- VHF: Canal 4 (Huamachuco)
- UHF: Canal 35 (Trujillo, Chimbote); Canal 41 (Piura); Canal 55 (Chiclayo)

Antena TV is a Peruvian television station, which transmits its signal since 2003, from Trujillo city for several cities of Peru. The channel is operated by Grupo NORTEL - RED TV company. It was one of the first regional channels airing in Trujillo city.

== History ==
This regional television station in northern Peru was founded in April 2003, and since then transmits its signal from the city of Trujillo. It has repeaters in different cities of the north of the country.

== See also ==
- Trujillo
- Victor Larco District
