= Arrabalera (1950 film) =

- Directed by: Tulio Demicheli
- Written by: Tulio Demicheli; Samuel Eichelbaum
- Starring: Tita Merello
- Cinematography: Francis Boeniger
- Release date: 25 April 1950
- Running time: 83 minutes
- Country: Argentina
- Language: Spanish

Arrabalera (English language:The Girl from the Suburbs) is a 1950 Argentine musical drama film of the classical era of Argentine cinema, directed and written by Tulio Demicheli on his debut and starring Tita Merello. It is based on a story by Samuel Eichelbaum. The film premiered on 25 April 1950 in Buenos Aires.

The film is a tango-based film, which is an integral part of Argentine culture.

== Main cast ==
- Tita Merello
- Santiago Gómez Cou
- Mario Fortuna
- Raúl del Valle
- Tito Alonso
- Marga López as Rosita
- Leticia Scury
- Blanca Tapia
- Julia Giusti
- Juan Pecci
- Oscar Soldati
- José Pecet
- Margarita Burke
- Celia Geraldy
- Carlos A. Gordillo
