= Sugar Harvest =

1958 film

- Directed by: Lucas Demare
- Written by: Sixto Pondal Ríos
- Produced by: Lucas Demare; Sixto Pondal Ríos
- Starring: Ariel Absalón
- Cinematography: Antonio Merayo
- Edited by: Jorge Gárate
- Release date: 1958
- Running time: 77 minute
- Country: Argentina
- Language: Spanish

Sugar Harvest (Spanish: Zafra) is a 1958 Argentine film directed by Lucas Demare. It was entered into the 1959 Cannes Film Festival.

== Cast ==
- Ariel Absalón
- Alfredo Alcón
- Graciela Borges
- José De Angelis
- Enrique Fava
- Domingo Garibotto
- Pedro Laxalt
- Luis Medina Castro
- Iris Portillo
- Romualdo Quiroga
- Félix Rivero
- Martha Roldán
- Rafael Salvatore
- Atahualpa Yupanqui
- Rossana Zucker
