= Francisco Petrone =

Argentine actor

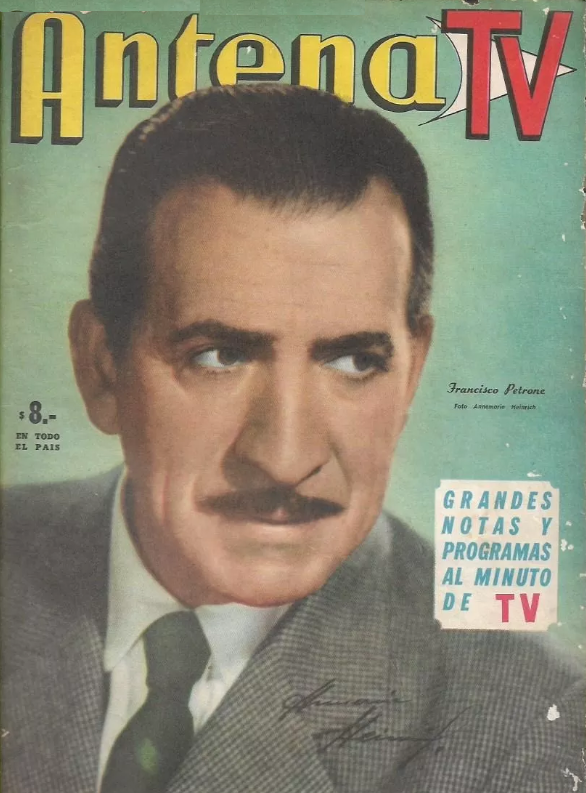
- Petrone on Antena TV cover, November 1961. Photograph by Annemarie Heinrich
- Born: August 14, 1902; Buenos Aires, Argentina
- Died: March 11, 1967 (aged 64); Buenos Aires

Francisco Petrone (August 14, 1902 – March 11, 1967) was an Argentine film actor, notable for his work during the Golden Age of Argentine cinema. He is best known for his roles in the 1940s in the classic film La Guerra Gaucha (1942) and A Real Man (Todo un hombre) (1943), for which he won the Silver Condor Award for Best Actor at the 1944 Argentine Film Critics Association Awards.

== Selected films ==
- 1935 Monte Criollo
- 1936 Sombras porteñas
- 1937 La fuga
- 1939 Hermanos (Brothers)
- 1939 Prisioneros de la tierra
- 1939 Turbión
- 1941 Persona honrada se necesita (Honest Person Needed)
- 1941 White Eagle
- 1942 La guerra gaucha (The Gaucho War)
- 1942 El viejo Hucha (The Old Skinflint)
- 1943 Todo un hombre (What a Man)
- 1945 Savage Pampas
- 1947 Como tú lo soñaste
- 1954 La duda (The Doubt)
- 1956 Historia de un marido infiel
- 1957 Todo sea para bien
- 1959 El dinero de Dios (God's Money)
- 1962 El hombre de la esquina rosada (Man on Pink Corner)
- 1965 El reñidero
