= Santiago Arrieta =

Uruguayan film actor

Santiago Arrieta (1897, Uruguay – 1975, Buenos Aires, Argentina) was a Uruguayan film actor, also known as Santiago Donadío. After emigrating to Argentina, Arrieta appeared in 26 films between 1935 and 1962, and is thus notable for his work during the Golden Age of Argentine cinema

== Selected filmography ==
- La fuga (1937)
- Only the Valiant (1940)
- The Soul of the Accordion (1935)
- The Boys Didn't Wear Hair Gel Before (1937)
- A Story of the Nineties (1949)
- I Was Born in Buenos Aires (1959)
- The Last Floor (1962)

== Bibliography ==
- Finkielman, Jorge. The Film Industry in Argentina: An Illustrated Cultural History. McFarland, 24 December 2003.
