= Luis Otero (actor) =

Argentine actor

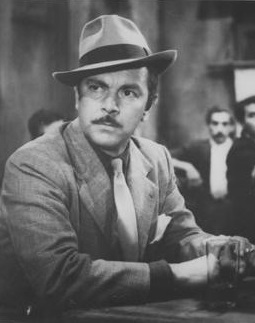
- Otero in 1952
- Born: Buenos Aires, Argentina
- Died: Buenos Aires, Argentina
- Occupation: Actor
- Years active: 1930-1967 (film)

Luis Otero was an Argentine film actor. He appeared in more than thirty films including Dark River (1952).

== Selected filmography ==
- Savage Pampas (1945)
- Madame Sans-Gêne (1945)
- Lost Kisses (1945)
- Story of a Bad Woman (1948)
- Don't Ever Open That Door (1952)
- Dark River (1952)
- The Black Market (1953)

== Bibliography ==
- Hammer, Tad. International film prizes: an encyclopedia. Garland, 1991.
