= Homero Cárpena =

Argentine actor

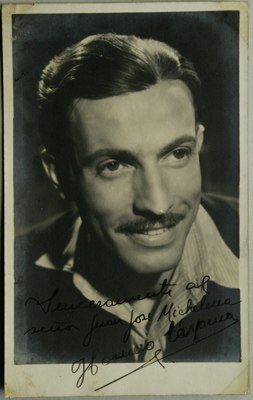
- Born: 14 February 1910; Mar del Plata, Buenos Aires, Argentina
- Died: 17 January 2001 (aged 90); Mar del Plata, Buenos Aires, Argentina
- Occupation: Actor
- Years active: 1933–1972

Homero Cárpena (14 February 1910 – 17 January 2001) was an Argentine film actor born in Mar del Plata, notable for his work during the Golden Age of Argentine cinema. He appeared in 72 films between 1933 and 1972 although the bulk of his work was in the late 1930s and 1940s. He starred in El hombre señalado, which was entered into the 7th Berlin International Film Festival. He was the father of actresses Claudia Cárpena and Nora Cárpena.

== Selected filmography ==
- Los tres berretines (1933)
- The Boys of the Old Days Didn't Use Hair Gel (1937)
- La fuga (1937)
- The Caranchos of Florida (1938)
- Encadenado (1940)
- El Fin de la noche (1944)
- Our Natacha (1944)
- Madame Sans-Gêne (1945)
- La Amada Inmóvil (1945)
- The Abyss Opens (1945)
- Buenos Aires Sings (1947)
- Story of a Bad Woman (1948)
- Hardly a Criminal (1949)
- The Gaucho Priest (1941)
- Los Lobos del palmar (1954)
- El hombre señalado (1957)
- El Rufián (1960)
