= Lucio Demare =

Argentine composer

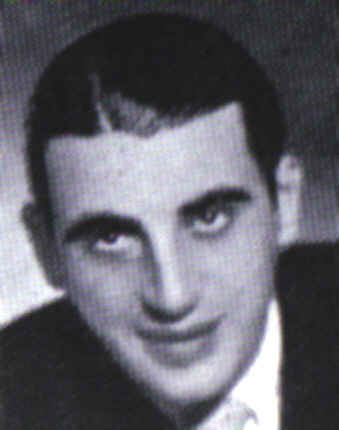
- Born: 9 August 1906; Buenos Aires, Argentina
- Died: 6 March 1974 (aged 67); Buenos Aires, Argentina
- Occupation: Composer
- Years active: 1933 - 1971 (film)

Lucio Demare (August 9, 1906 – March 6, 1974) was an Argentine composer who worked on a number of film scores. He was the brother of the film director Lucas Demare, and scored several of his films.

== Selected filmography ==
- Prisoners of the Earth (1939)
- The Gaucho Priest (1941)
- The Gaucho War (1942)
- His Best Student (1944)
- The Corpse Breaks a Date (1944)
- Savage Pampas (1945)
- Behind a Long Wall (1958)

== Bibliography ==
- Finkielman, Jorge. The Film Industry in Argentina: An Illustrated Cultural History. McFarland, 2003.
