= The Flamethrowers =

The Flamethrowers may refer to:

- The Flamethrowers (Arlt novel), a 1931 novel by Roberto Arlt
- The Flamethrowers (Kushner novel), a 2013 novel by American author Rachel Kushner

== See also ==
- Flamethrower (disambiguation)
