= Arlt =

Arlt is a surname. Notable people with the name Arlt include:

- Carl Ferdinand von Arlt (1812–1887), Austrian ophthalmologist
- Fritz Arlt (1912–2004), German Nazi Party official
- Johannes Arlt (born 1984), German politician
- Lewis Arlt, American director, actor, and writer
- Paul Theodore Arlt (1914–2005), American painter
- Mirta Arlt (1923–2014), Argentine writer and theatre scholar
- Roberto Arlt (1900–1942), Argentine writer
- Tobias Arlt (born 1987), German luger
- Willi Arlt (1919–1947), German footballer

== See also ==
- Association for the Reform of Latin Teaching (ARLT)
