= Russian Argentines =

Argentines of Russian birth or descent

Pусские аргентинцы (Russian) Ruso-argentinos (Spanish)
- (Argentina) (Russia)
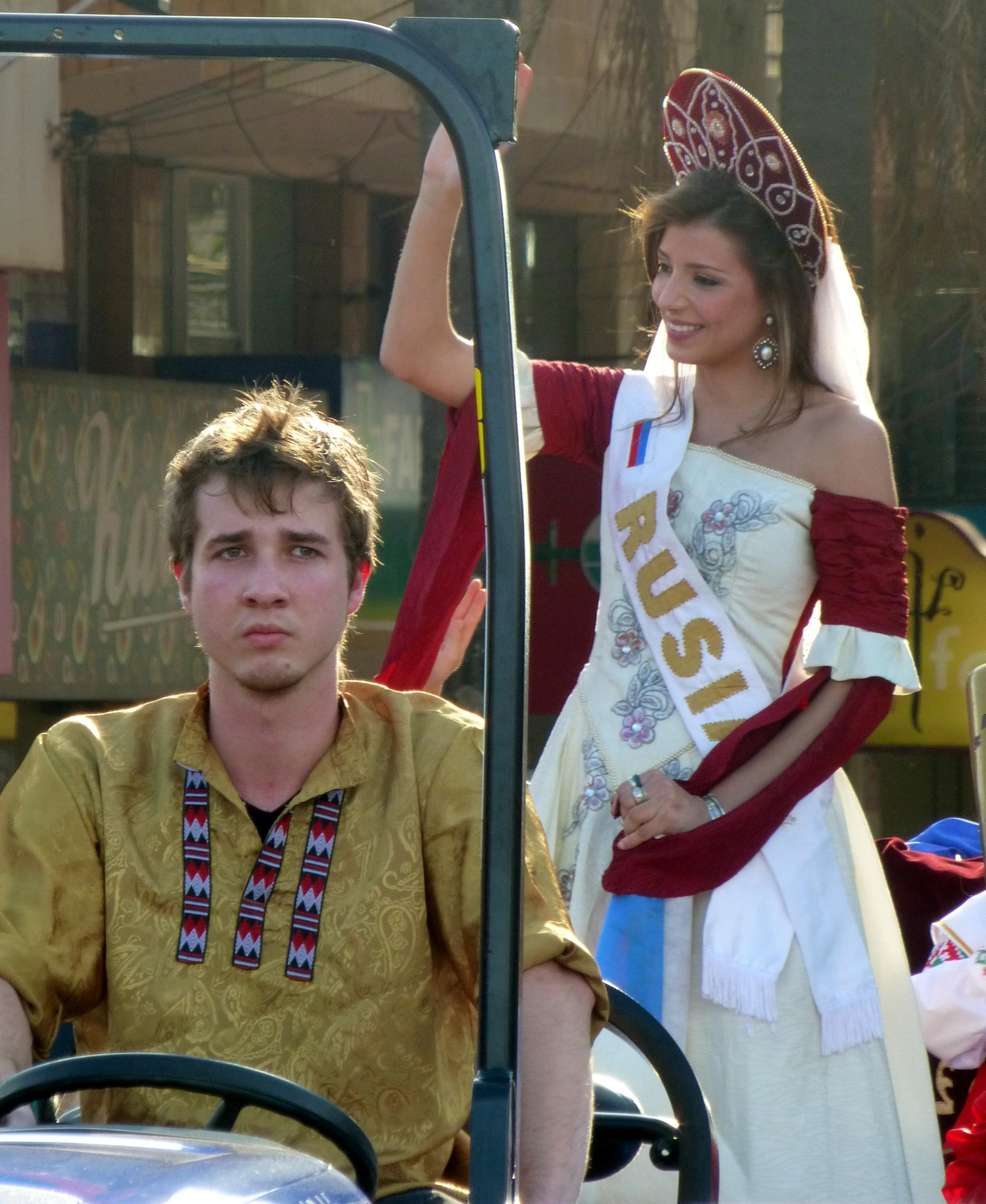
- Argentines of Russian origin during Immigrant's Festival in Oberá, Misiones

Total population
- Unknown (by birth) + 400,000 (by ancestry); 0.8% of Argentina's population

Regions with significant populations
- Predominantly in the Pampas and in Misiones

Languages
- Spanish · Russian

Religion
- Majority: Christianity (Roman Catholicism · Eastern Orthodoxy); Minority: Judaism · Irreligion

Related ethnic groups
- Russians · Russian Brazilians · Russian Uruguayans · Russian Americans

Russian Argentines are people from Russia living in Argentina, and their Argentine-born descendants. The estimates of the number of Argentines of Russian descent vary between 370,000 and 400,000. They are mostly living in Buenos Aires and Greater Buenos Aires.

Most Russian immigrants arrived in Argentina between 1880 and 1921, while a smaller number arrived in the 1990s. Russian movement into Argentina can be divided into five waves of immigration, the last three consisting of actual ethnic Russians, while the first one consists of immigrants categorized as "Russian" due to their origin in the Russian Empire even though a substantial number were not in fact ethnic Russians (but included substantial numbers of Volga Germans and Jews).

Since the beginning of the Russian invasion of Ukraine in 2022, thousands of Russians migrated to Argentina. Up to 23,000 Russian citizens were granted extended visa rights to stay in Argentina between 2022 and 2023. Many of these immigrants did not stay long in Argentina, as they were attracted primarily by lax migration and citizenship laws and the ease of attaining an Argentinian passport. The remaining bulk of Russian immigrants have since settled in the Greater Buenos Aires area.

== Immigration history ==
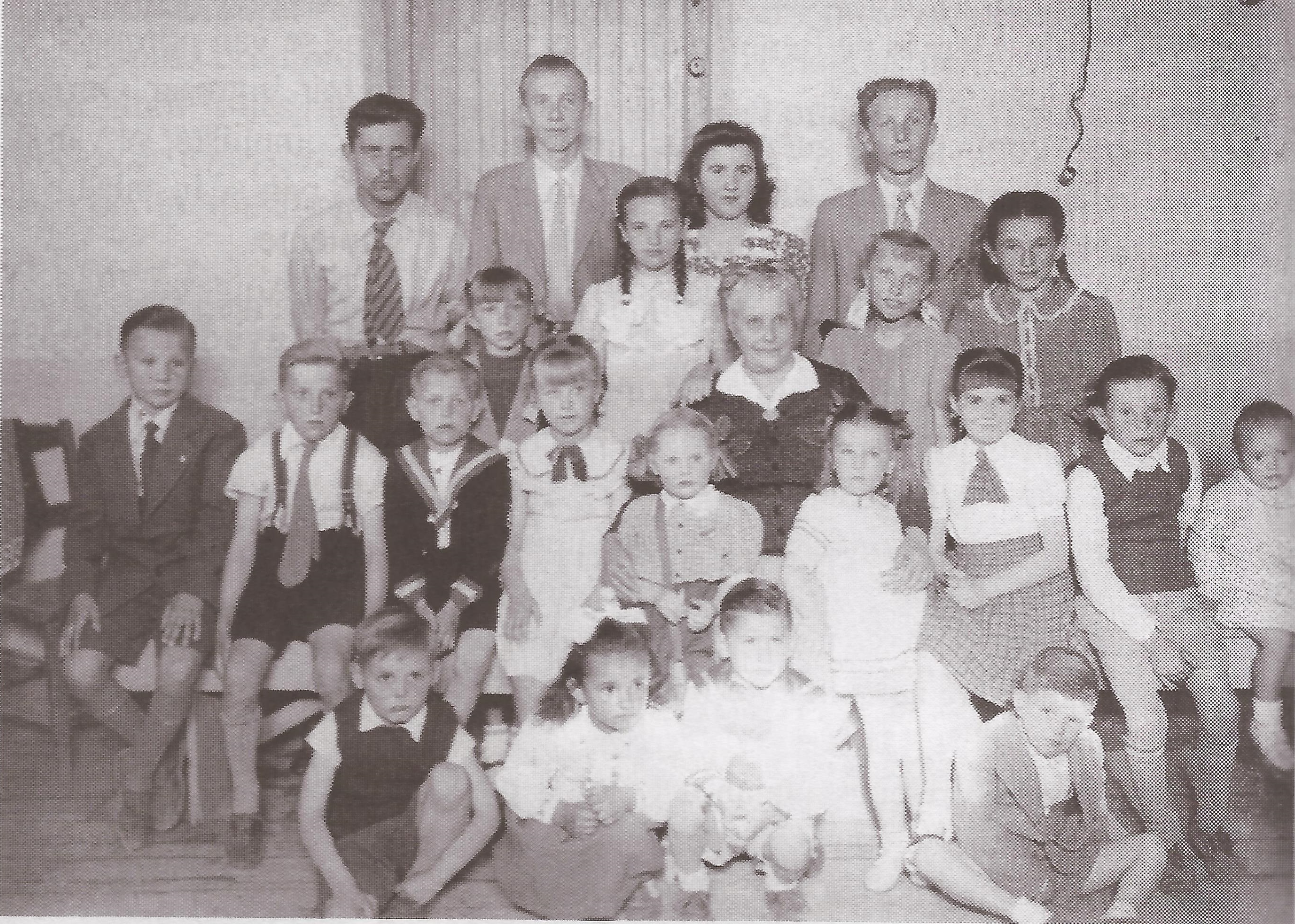
Russian Argentine children with their Russian language and dance teacher in Comodoro Rivadavia, Chubut, around 1945.

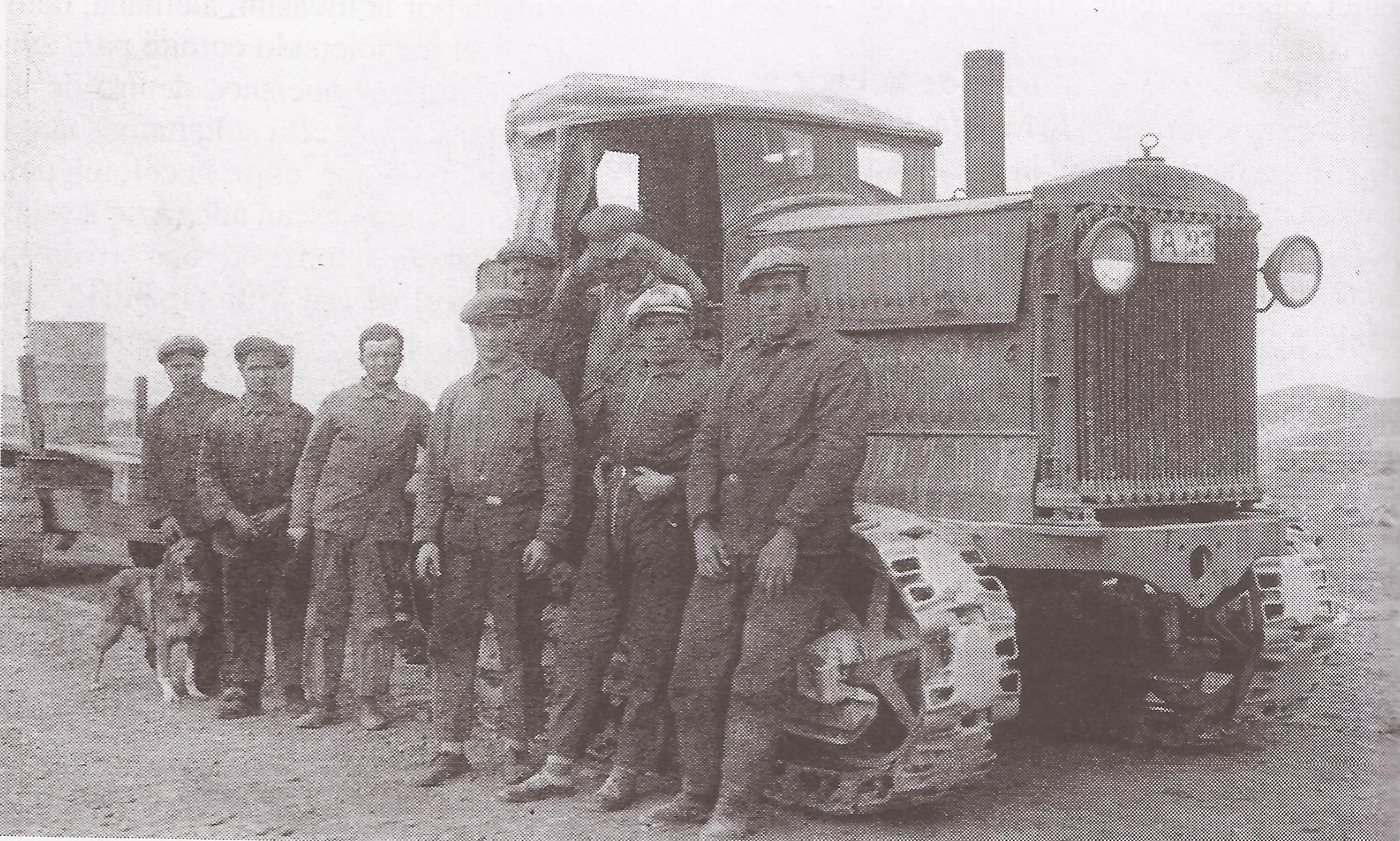
Russian workers at the Astra oil field, Chubut in 1936.

During the late 19th century and early 20th century, a variety of groups from the Russian Empire emigrated to Argentina. From 1901 to 1920, Russia was the third most common country of origin for immigrants in Argentina. By ethnicity, the immigrants primarily consisted of Jews and Volga Germans, but also included Poles, Finns, and Ukrainians. By 1910, Argentina's population included 45,000 Germans. In the last 80 years, many of the immigrants to Argentina have been Slavs: Bulgarians, Serbians, and Montenegrins, often looking for the patronage of Orthodox Russia in a Catholic country. Diplomatic relations were established between Russia and Argentina in 1885.

Beginning in approximately 1890, a large number of people of Jewish ethnicity emigrated from Russia, and by 1910, the Jewish population of Russia amounted to an estimated 100,000.

Percentage of people registered as Russian in the 1914 Argentine census.

Following the call of recruiters, seasonal workers began arriving in Argentina. These were mostly peasants from the western provinces of Russia. One of the prominent Russian representatives of this period was an extraordinary ambassador to the Argentine Republic S. Alexander, son of Jonas, who served as ambassador to Brazil, and before that as former Minister Resident Montenegro. Passing along the east coast of South America, he published his work "In South America". His efforts helped root Orthodox Christians in Argentina. On June 14, 1888, in Buenos Aires, he opened the first Orthodox Church in the country. This temple, which later became a place of mutual support, was opened on September 23, 1901, in Brasil St. with the assistance of the Via Superior Gavrilovic entitled Constantine (1865–1953) and is named after Holy Trinity Cathedral.

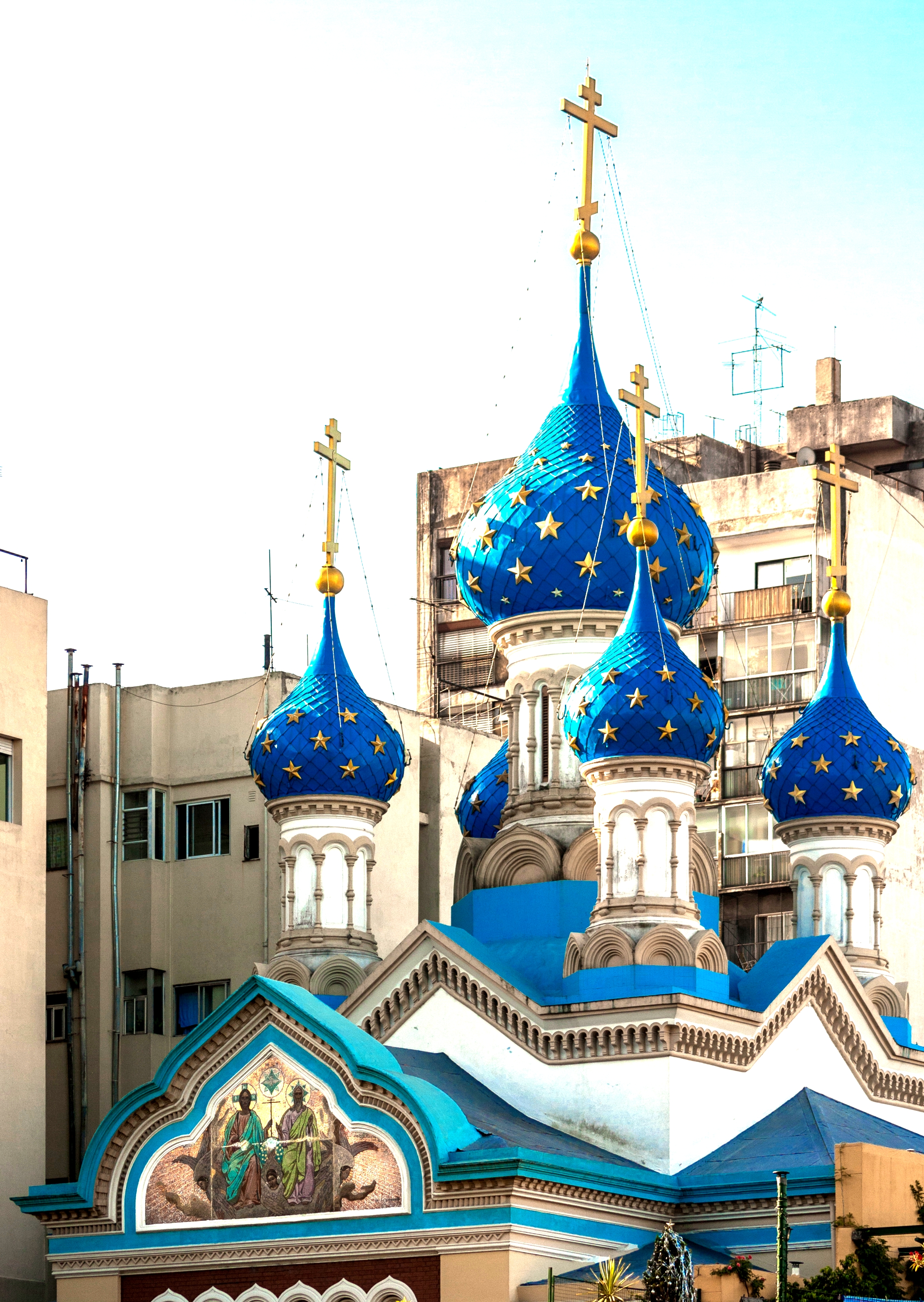
Russian Orthodox Cathedral of the Most Holy Trinity located in the neighborhood of San Telmo, Buenos Aires. It was designed by Norwegian Argentine architect Alejandro Christophersen.

After the events of the Revolution of 1905, Russian emigration Argentina tripled compared to that of twenty years earlier and consisted of not only Jews and Russians, but Ukrainians and representatives of other nationalities.

After the Russian Revolution and the start of the Russian Civil War, some White émigrés also settled in Argentina. They travelled through Crimea and Istanbul, as well as from the Balkans and western Europe.

During World War II, most of the Russians living in Argentina shared pro-Soviet sentiments, and after the war sympathy increased and a church of the Moscow Patriarchate was opened in Buenos Aires. There was also a new exodus of émigrés from Europe.

Among them were ten priests of the Russian Orthodox Church and a few hundred soldiers: eight generals, a few dozen colonels, about twenty members of the Page Corps, about forty Knights of St. George and more than twenty officers of the Imperial Russian Navy. About 250 cadets also emigrated.

In the 1950s after the victory of Mao Zedong's Communist forces over the Kuomintang forces of Generalissimo Chiang Kai-shek Russian Old Believers, who were previously forced into exodus to China by the Russian Revolution of 1917 (see Russians in China), fled to Hong Kong where the UN provided support to them for migrating to different parts of the world, including Argentina. Since then about 20 families of «White Russians», as they are known locally, maintain their original "peasant" way of life, many of them living a subsistence economy, in Choele Choel in Río Negro Province.

In 1969, Archbishop Leontius (Vasily Konstantinovich Filipovich) came to Buenos Aires. He set about the task of overcoming the split between the Soviet and the monarchist-minded congregations. He died in 1971, and the split was overcome only in the 1990s. The last significant wave of emigration coincided with the Perestroika and included Russians who came in search of permanent work and residence in Argentina.

However, since the start of the Russian invasion of Ukraine in 2022, in light of the international sanctions on Russian passports, various Russian couples and pregnant Russian women, started to emigrate to Argentina in hopes of acquiring Argentine passport to, rather continuing their journey to Europe or to permanently establish in Argentina with their children. As of July 2023, more than 18,500 Russians have come to Argentina after Russia invaded Ukraine. Argentina does not require a visa for Russians citizens to enter the country as tourists and it also allows the parents of children born on Argentinian soil to receive residency, and, later, a passport. This opportunity led to that about 10,500 pregnant Russians traveled to Argentina to give birth in 2022.

The migratory “boom” of Russian families peaked between 2022 and 2023 but it began to decrease in 2024. Now, the trend seems to be changing: many of them are leaving, driven out by the high dollar-based cost of living in Argentina. Data provided by the National Directorate of Migration to LA NACION confirm the slowdown. In 2022, 1,700 residence permits were requested; in 2023, 7,123; in 2024, 4,915. By July 2025, 2,290 had been requested. And, for the first time since 2022, in 2025 applications for temporary residence exceeded those for permanent residence. Moreover, the situation for immigrants have worsened after the enactment of DNU 366/2025, published in May in the Boletín Oficial, which amends Migration Law 25.871 and, among other things, raises the minimum requirements for foreigners to access the different categories of residence in the country, as well as healthcare and higher education.

The current ruling bishop of the Russian Orthodox Church Outside of Russia in the Argentine and South American dioceses is Bishop John of Caracas (Peter Berzin before monasticism). The previous was Archbishop Platon (Vladimir Udovenko).

== Notable people ==
- Eugenio Bulygin, philosopher, legal scholar
- Stepan Erzia, sculptor
- Nicolás Gorobsov, footballer
- Vasily Kharlamov, politician
- Jorge Remes Lenicov, finance minister
- Coti Sorokin, singer-songwriter

== See also ==
- Russians
- Russian diaspora
- Argentina–Russia relations
- Immigration to Argentina
- Cathedral of the Most Holy Trinity, Buenos Aires
