= Café Tortoni =

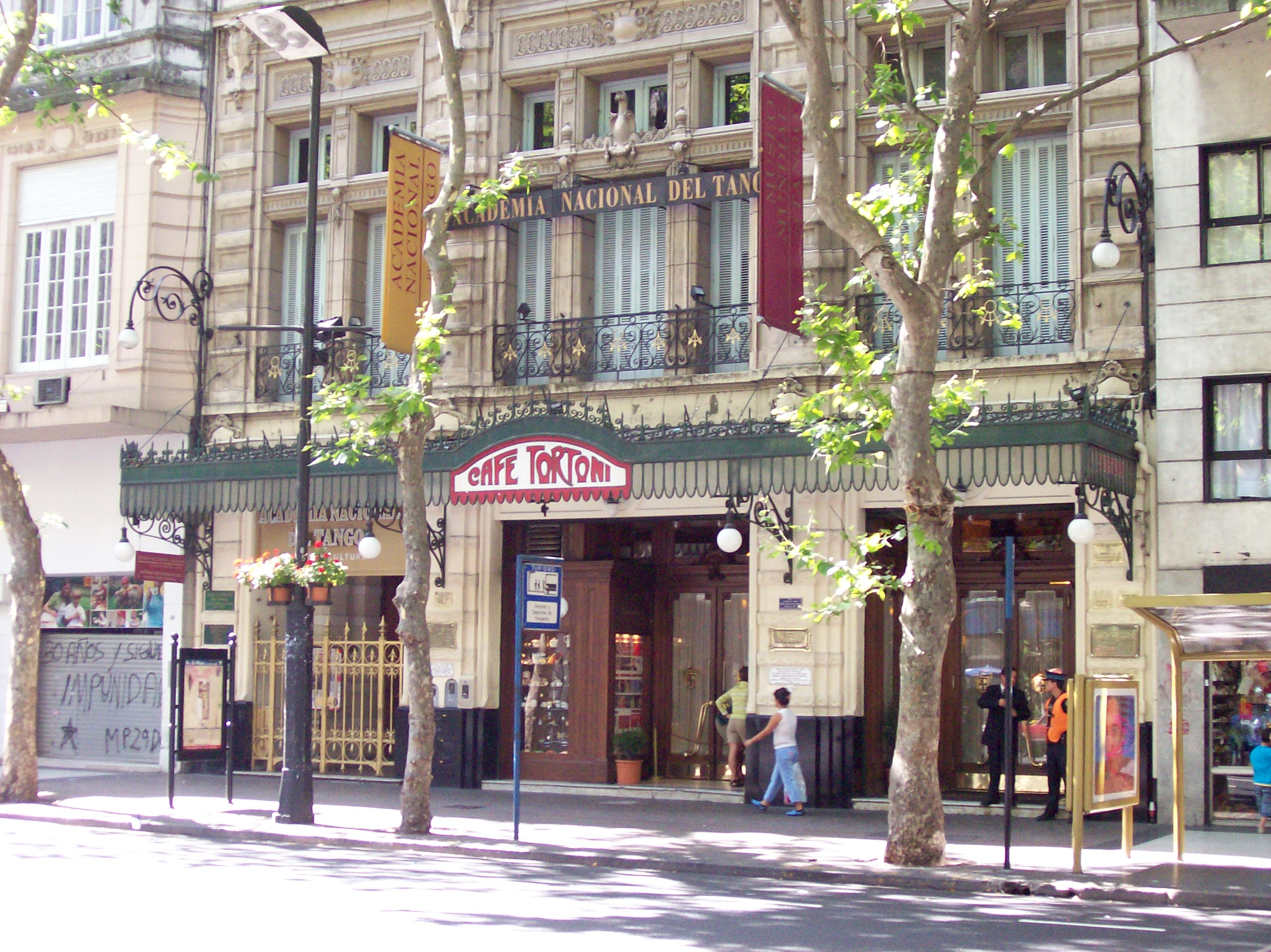
- Front facade of the café in 2006 Café Tortoni (Buenos Aires) Location in Buenos Aires
- Interactive map of Café Tortoni
- Location: 1. 825 Avenida de Mayo, Buenos Aires, Argentina

History
- Built: 1858

Site notes
- Architect: Alejandro Christophersen
- Website: cafetortoni.com.ar

National Historic Monument of Argentina

The Café Tortoni is a coffeehouse located at 825 Avenida de Mayo in Buenos Aires, Argentina. First opened in 1858 by a French immigrant whose surname was Touan, it was named Tortoni after the Parisian café of the same name located on Boulevard des Italiens (where the elite of Parisian culture gathered in the 19th century). The café itself was inspired by Fin de siècle coffee houses. Café Tortoni was selected by UCityGuides as one of the ten most beautiful cafes in the world.

== History ==
The café in 1910

The area the café currently occupies was previously the location of the Templo Escocés ("Scottish Temple"), and the Tortoni was located on the corner of Rivadavia and Esmeralda. In 1880 it moved to its present location, but had its entrance on the other side of the block in Rivadavia Street. In 1898 the entrance on Avenida de Mayo was opened, and the facade was redesigned by architect Alejandro Christophersen. At the end of the 19th century, the café was bought by another Frenchman, Celestino Curutchet.

In the basement, La Peña (see peña) was established in 1926, which fomented the protection of the arts and literature until its disintegration in 1943. Among its visitors were Alfonsina Storni, Baldomero Fernández Moreno [es], Juana de Ibarbourou, Arthur Rubinstein, Ricardo Vines, Roberto Arlt, José Ortega y Gasset, Jorge Luis Borges, Florencio Molina Campos, and Benito Quinquela Martín.

Over the years the café has been visited by many renowned people including politicians Lisandro de la Torre and Marcelo Torcuato de Alvear, popular idols Carlos Gardel and Juan Manuel Fangio, international figures like Albert Einstein, Federico García Lorca, Hillary Clinton, Robert Duvall and Juan Carlos de Borbón.

Currently the basement works as a stage for jazz and tango artists, and for the presentation of book and poetry contests. The café has conserved the decoration of its early years, has a library and at the back facilities to play billiards, dominoes and dice.

== Notable visitors ==
- Albert Einstein
- Hillary Clinton
- Francis Ford Coppola
- Federico Garcia Lorca
- Abiy Ahmed
- Vittorio Gassman
- Katy Perry
- Robert Duvall
- Luigi Pirandello
- Patti Smith
- Juan Carlos de Borbón

== Gallery ==
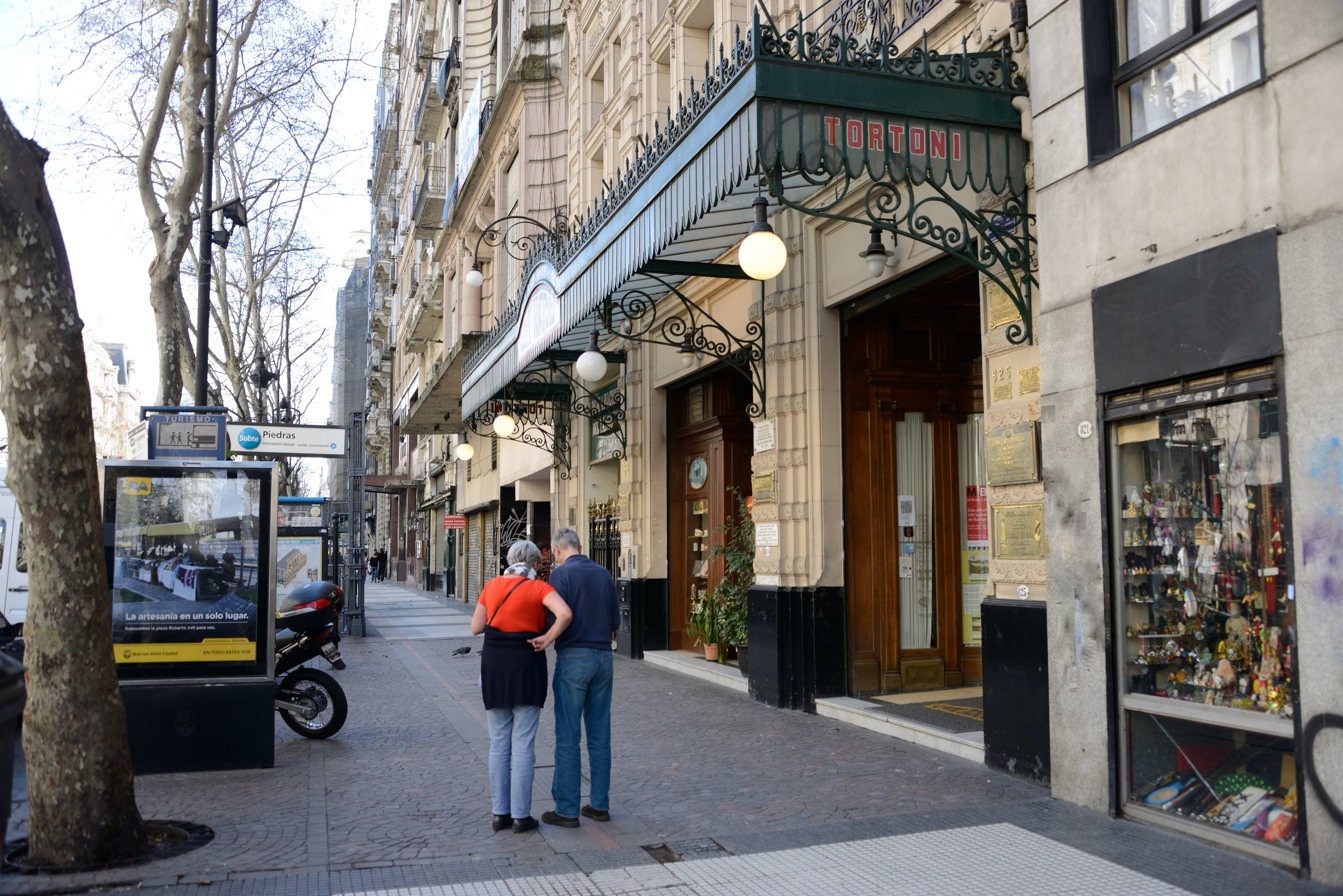
Tortoni exterior

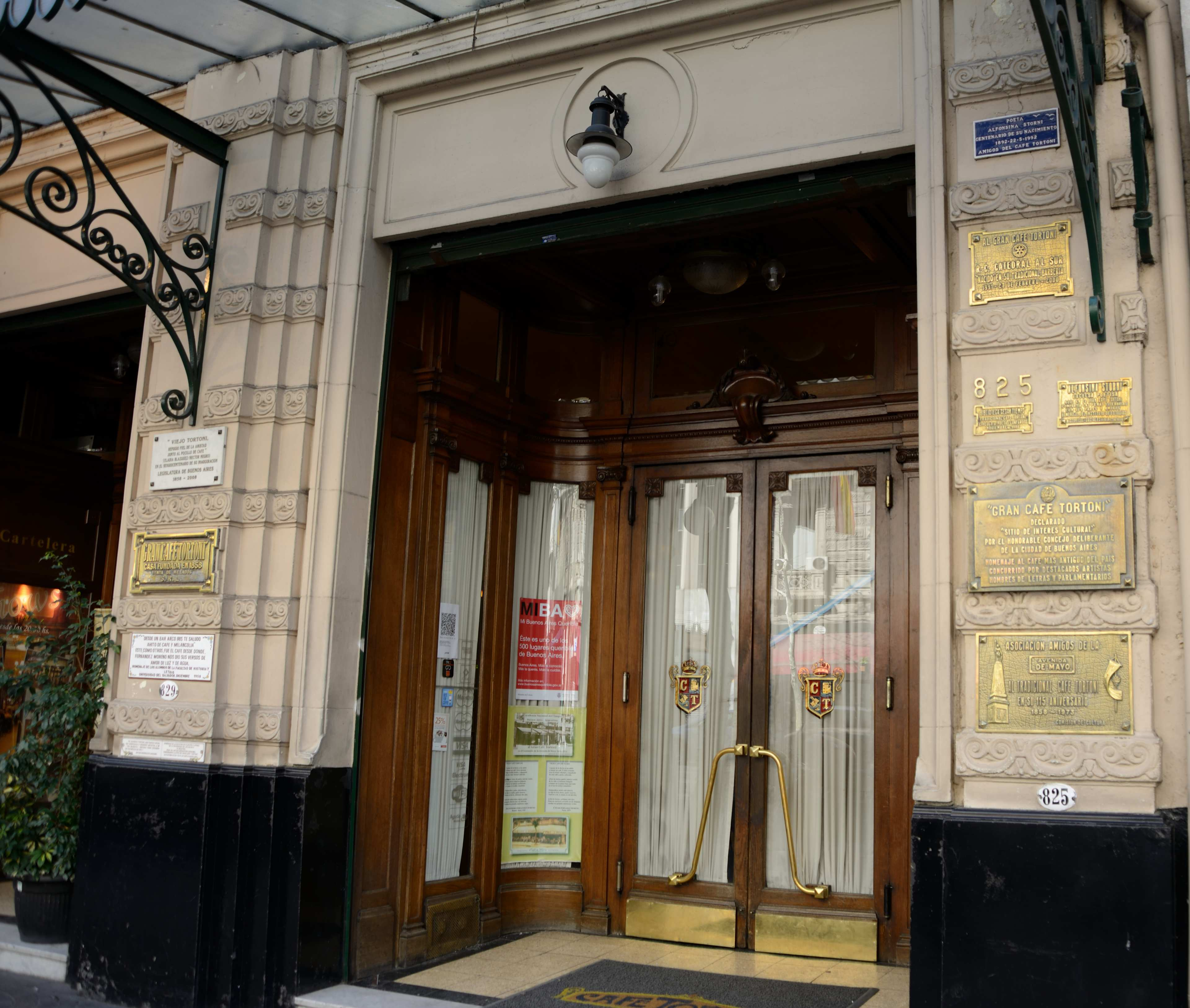
Entrance to the Café

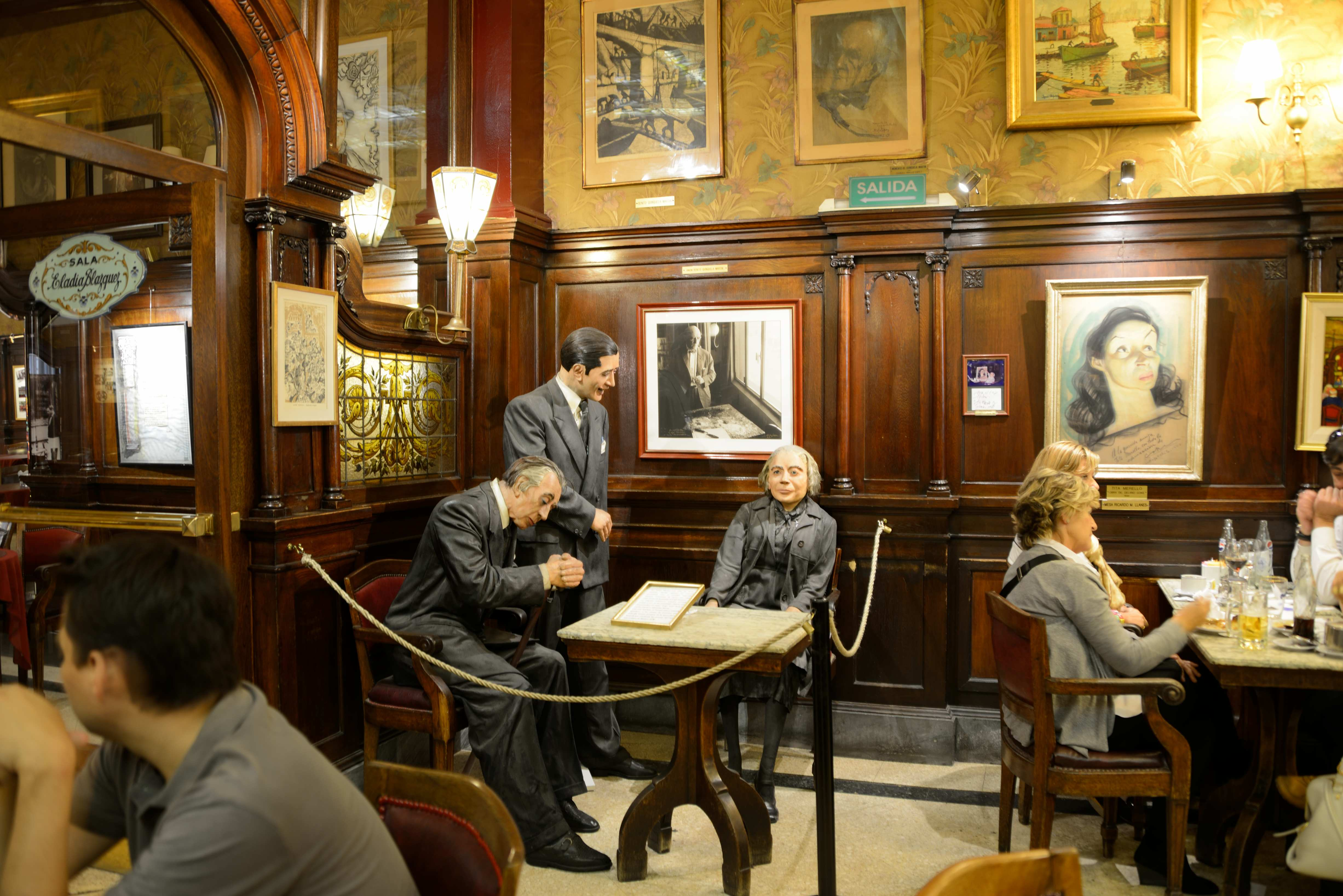
Jorge Luis Borges's regular table, with wax sculpture

Vitraux

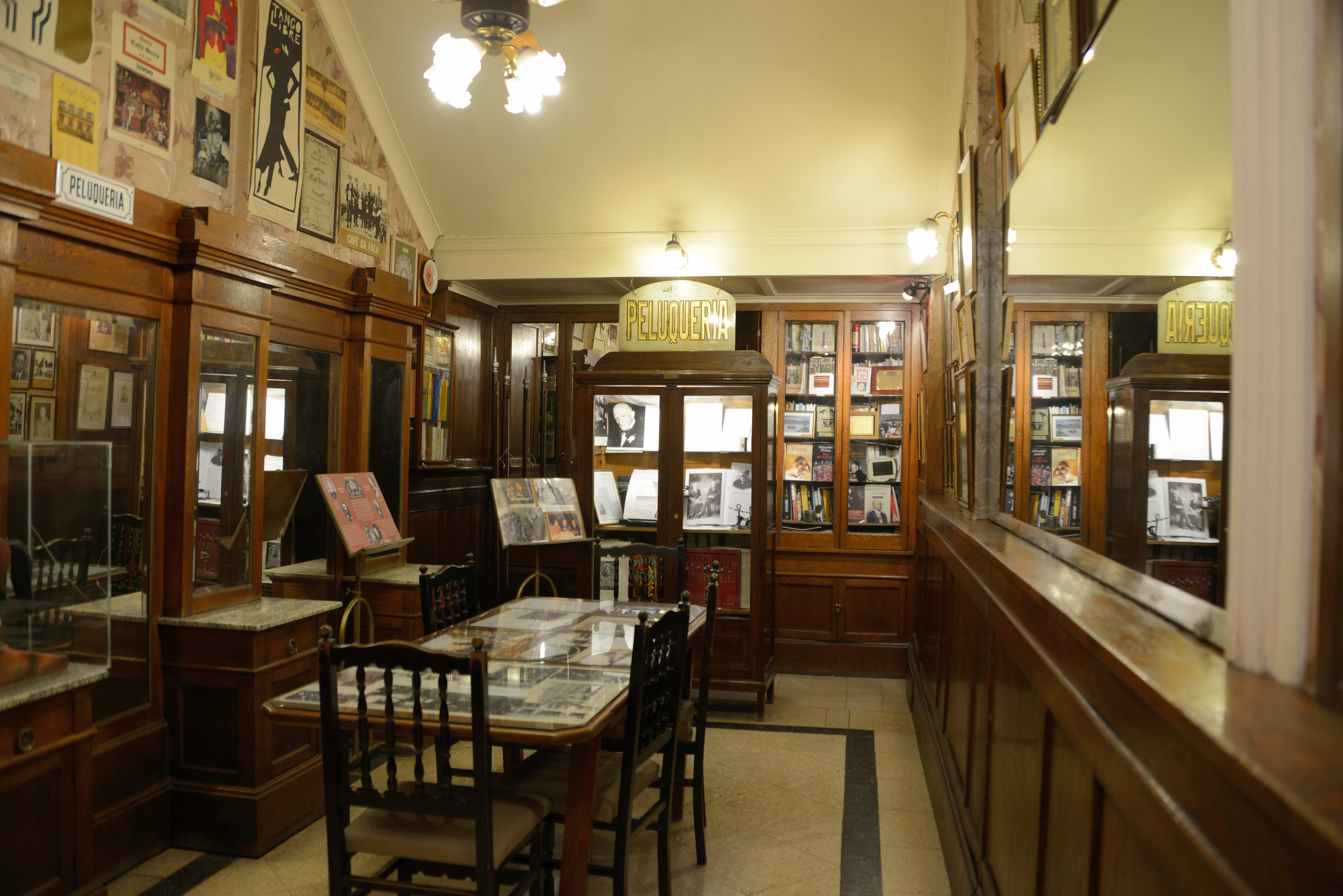
Old barber area

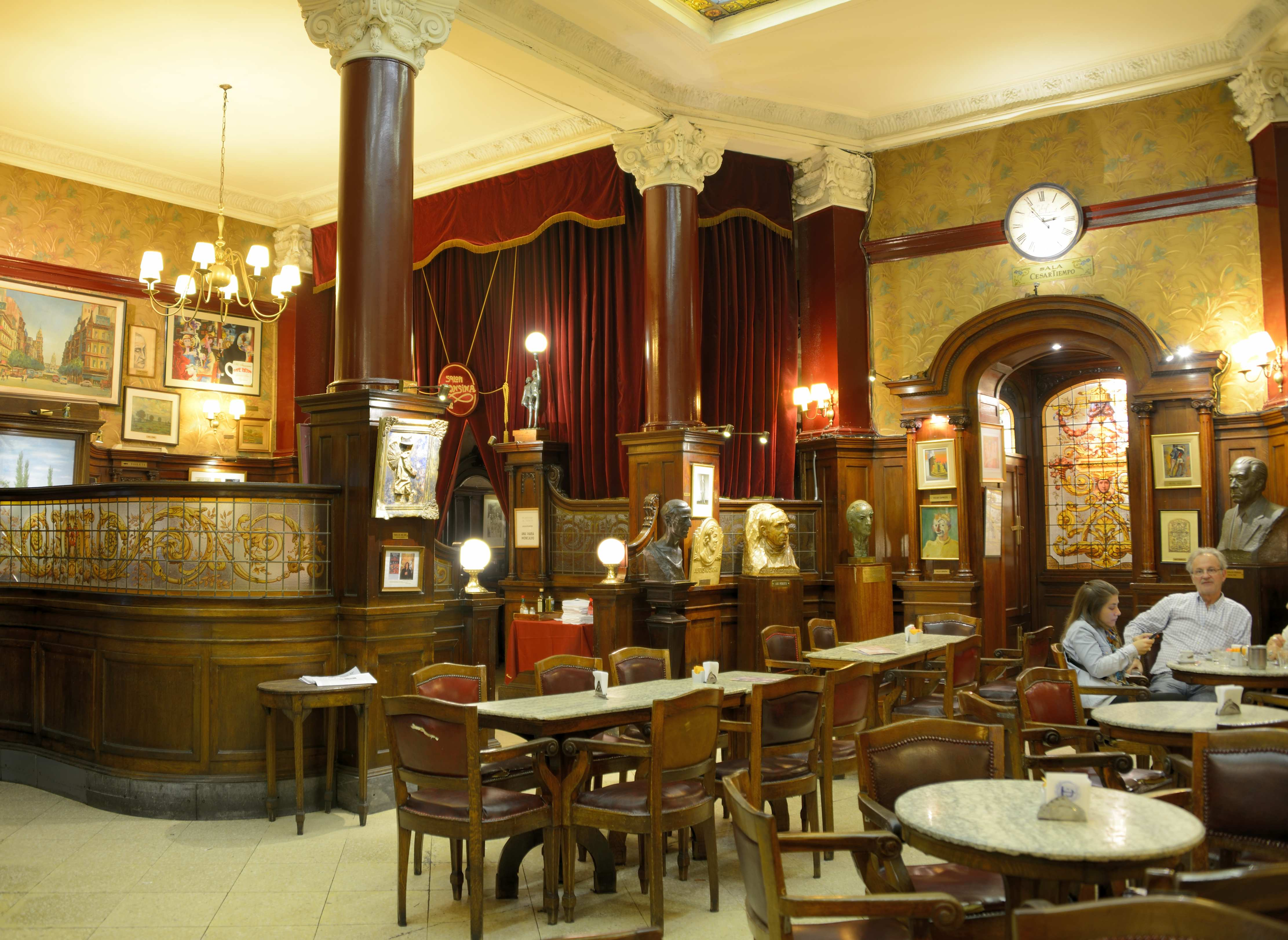
Display of busts

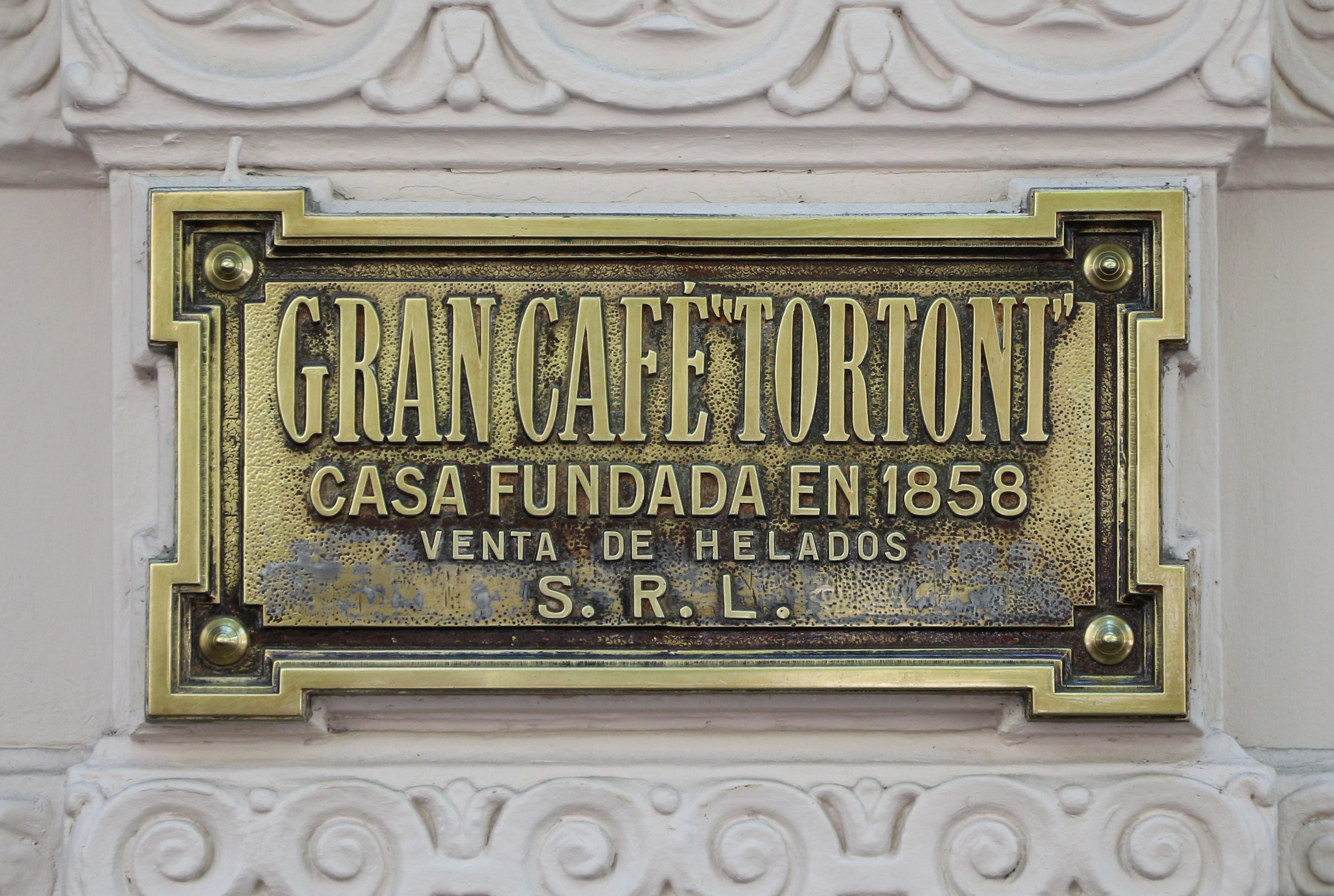
Plaque in front of the Cafe

Whole building

Tortoni at night

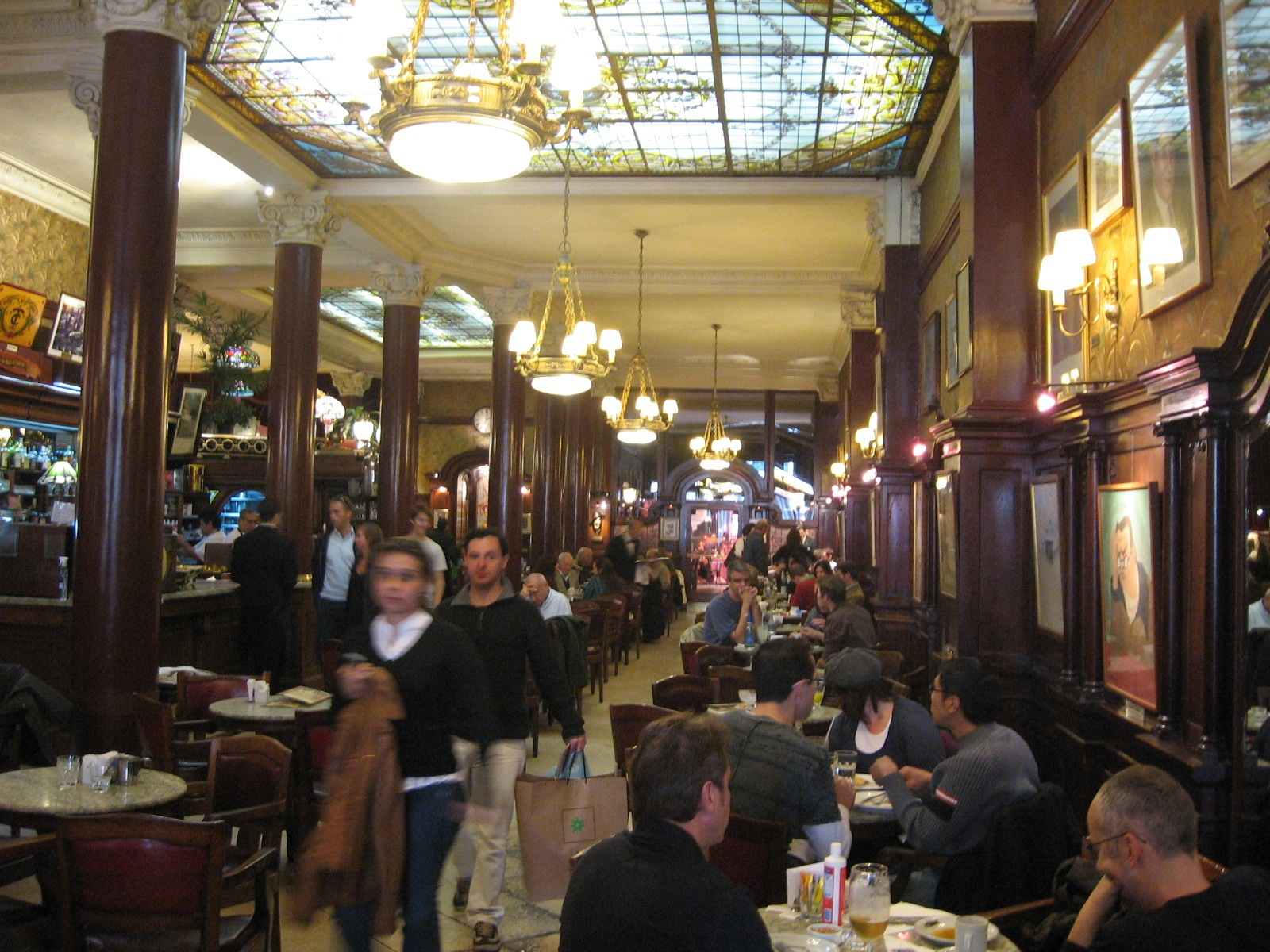
View of the interior
