= Osvaldo Terranova =

Argentine actor

- Born: 30 August 1923; Villaguay, Entre Ríos
- Died: 4 October 1984 (aged 61)
- Years active: 1949–1984

Osvaldo Terranova (30 August 1923 – 4 October 1984) was an Argentine film actor.

Terranova made over 50 appearances mostly in film between 1949 and 1985. In the early 1980s he made several TV appearances. His last film was Adios Roberto, which was released in 1985 after his death.

== Selected filmography ==
- From Man to Man (1949)
- The Kidnapper (1958)
- The Party Is Over (1960)
- The Seven Madmen (1973)
- Rebellion in Patagonia (1974)
