= Mad Toy =

Book by Roberto Arlt

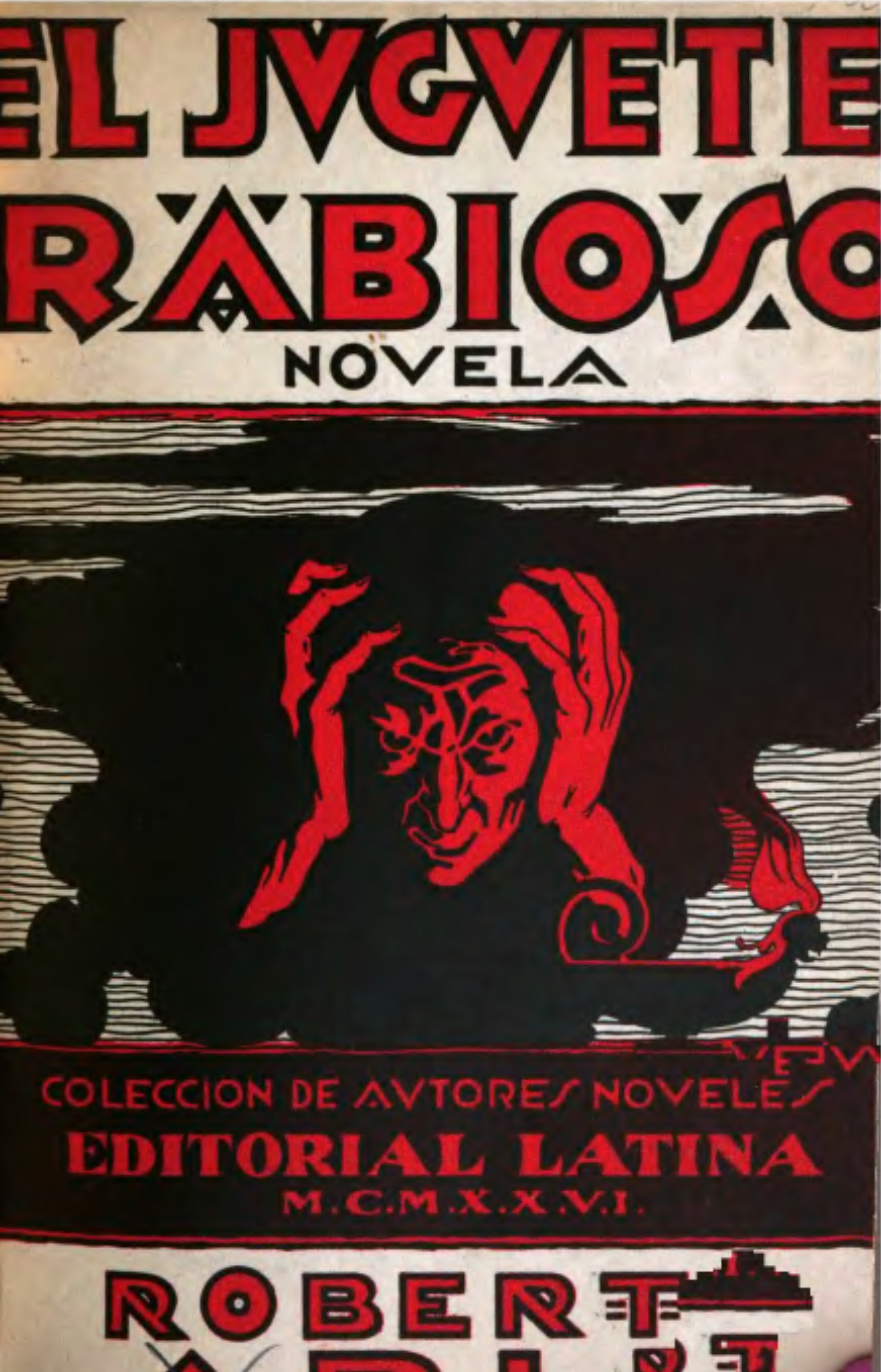
- Cover to the first edition
- Author: Roberto Arlt
- Original title: El juguete rabioso
- Cover artist: Unknown
- Language: Spanish
- Subject: Childhood, juvenile delinquency
- Genre: Novel
- Publisher: Editorial Latina, Duke University Press
- Publication date: 1926
- Publication place: Buenos Aires
- English publication date: 2002
- Media type: Print
- Followed by: Los siete locos

Mad Toy (original title: El juguete rabioso: "The rabid toy") is the debut novel by Argentinean author Roberto Arlt. Published in 1926 by Editorial Latina, it is markedly autobiographical in nature. The original manuscripts were written in the 1920s and were drafted by Arlt in the mountains of Córdoba, in a time when his wife, Carmen, who suffered complications from tuberculosis, needed to move to the mountains to recover from her illness. Arlt invested a considerable amount of money in businesses that did not grow, and had to accompany his wife, so he began work on Mad Toy.

Upon his return to Buenos Aires, Arlt tried to publish his novel in the Los Nuevos collection of the publisher Claridad, but the editor of the collection, Elías Castelnuovo, did not like the book. It was then when chance brought him to Ricardo Güiraldes, who, after hearing readings of the book, encouraged Arlt to continue looking for a publisher, and gave him a job as a secretary.

The novel was translated into English by Michele McKay Aynesworth and published in 2002 by Duke University Press.

== Plot summary ==
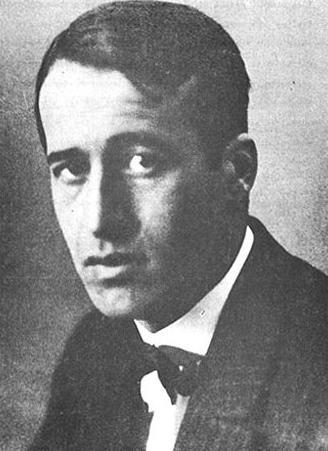
Roberto Arlt's friend Ricardo Güiraldes (pictured) encouraged him to publish the novel

The book is narrated in first person and is cleanly constructed. The apprenticeship of the protagonist, Silvio Astier, develops in four separate episodes. In the first, “The Band Of Thieves,” Silvio, influenced by reading melodramas, and, perhaps more, by his deplorable position in society, founds the “Club of the Gentlemen of Midnight” with two other adolescents, which is dedicated to petty theft in the neighborhood. After a failure, the club stops its activities.

In the second, “Work and days,” Silvio, after moving neighborhoods, finds work at a bookstore and moves to the house of don Gaetano, the owner of the store. There he sees terrible scenes of meanness and suffers several humiliations. At the end he tries to burn the bookstore that he works in, but fails and then leaves his post.

In the third, “Mad Toy,” Silvio tries to attend the School of Aviation as a mechanic's apprentice. At first he is accepted, and the school directors are surprised at his brilliance, but later, suddenly, they expel him, because they say they do not need intelligent people, but brutes for work. Following this, Silvio lives through a strange adventure with a homosexual in a miserable hotel room. After leaving, he buys a revolver and tries to commit suicide, but he fails at this too.

In the fourth part, “Judas Iscariote,” the protagonist, a little older, has become a door-to-door paper salesman, a job that seems as vile and humiliating as all of his previous employments. He meets one of his partners in the “Club of the Gentlemen of Midnight” who has become a detective and “regenerated” in the fight for life.

Silvio becomes friends with Rengo, a marginal character, who works as a caretaker for cars in the fair of Flores. Certain intimacy seems to flourish between Silvio and Rengo. Rengo tells Silvio about his plan to steal from Vitri, the engineer's, house, who is the boss of Rengo's lover. Silvio accepts the job. Later, almost mechanically, Silvio asks himself, “But what if I betray him?” Later, Silvio goes to see Vitri, betrays Rengo, who is arrested. Silvio has one final conversation with Vitri, in which he communicates his desire to move to the south of the country.

This dark tradition does not have precedents in Argentinean literature. Arlt follows, perhaps unknowingly, the steps of the Marquis de Sade, and of the Count Lautréamont. The structure of the first three episodes are homologous: Silvio's attempt to affirm himself as an individual (through antisocial acts in the first two cases and through a suicide in the third), and then he fails miserably. In the fourth episode, this game of opposites and interrelations complicates itself- Silvio seems to find the possibility of a human relationship with Rengo, and then he betrays him- this is the only time when he doesn't fail, when he commits an act that is socially good but individually evil.

Bitterly, the book closes and the reader suspects that there is salvation neither for Silvio nor for the society in which he lives. The book doesn't explain the social situation, nor the thoughts of its characters; all explanation is given through action, and through the telling of the facts. In the first episode, fiction penetrates reality; the adventure novels are, at the same time, material and motive of the occurrences; life of the characters mimics the life of other characters, those of fiction inside of fiction.

== Film adaptations ==
Mad Toy was adapted for cinema twice: by José María Paolantonio in 1984 and by Javier Torre in 1998. Referring to the 1984 version, Alicia Aisemberg wrote that the movie “tried to capture Arlt's writing in film. Some of the resources used were silence and still shots, the use of voice-over to represent the monologue of Asier, and a production that passes through dirty and miserable spaces that show a filthy reality.

With respect to the 1998 version, the critic of Clarín, Rafael Granado said that it was a respectful, sensitive adaptation, loyal to the original (except for minimal modifications), which shows the director's admiration for the writer.

== See also ==
- Roberto Arlt
