= Sergio Olguín =

Argentine author, journalist and literary critic

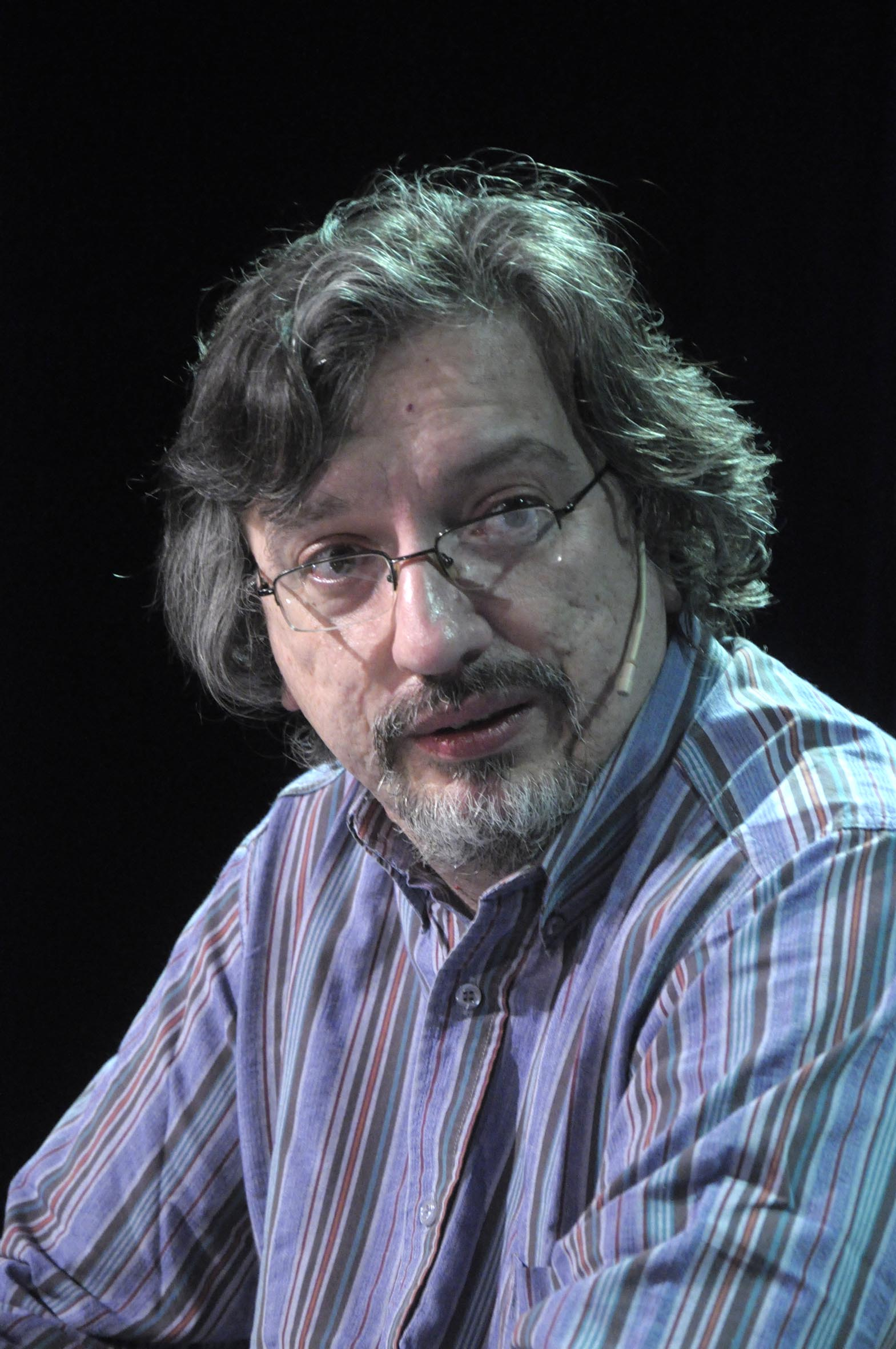
Sergio Olguín in 2011

Sergio Olguín is an Argentine author, journalist and literary critic born on 29 January 1967 in Buenos Aires. Whereas most of the novels that he has published to date can be categorised as youth literature, he has also published stories and novels that do not fall in this category.

== Biography ==
He grew up in a middle class suburb of Buenos Aires called Lanús and studied Literature at the University of Buenos Aires.

In 1983 he won the First Prize of the Short Story Competition organized by the magazine Humor & Juegos.

He began his journalistic activity in 1984. Throughout his career, he has published articles in newspapers such as Página/12, La Nación, El País (Montevideo) and La Capital and the magazines trespuntos, Playboy, La Maga, Noticias, Film, Karavan (Stockholm) and other media. Until 1989, he worked as editor of the magazine Famiglia Cristiana, the publication of the Congregation of the Daughters of St Paul.

In 1989 he was the joint winner of the First Prize in the poetry category at the Primera Bienal de Arte Joven (First Biennial of Youth Art) of the City of Buenos Aires. He also obtained a special mention in the story category. The next year he founded the cultural magazine V de Vian, which he managed until 2000. The magazine set out to shock the establishment and always carried a picture of a nude woman on its cover. The Argentina Book Chamber awarded this magazine the Julio Cortázar Prize for alternative media in 1998.

He was co-author of the play "Imakinaria" that premiered in Cemento in 1990. The play was also staged at the Centro Cultural Ricardo Rojas of the University of Buenos Aires in 1990. In the same year he was a founding member of the magazine El amante cine, that he directed until 1992.

From 1992 until 1998, he was responsible for the Books section of the magazine Página/30. He was also the coordinator for the literature segment of the cultural event Desde el Borde, organized by the Fundación Banco Patricios in 1993.

The next year he obtained a First Mention in the Concurso de Narrativa del Concejo Deliberante of the City of Buenos Aires. He edited the books Secretos femeninos. Aguafuertes inéditas and Tratado de delincuencia. Aguafuertes inéditas which collected previously uncollected journalistic and critical writings of the Argentine cult writer Roberto Arlt and were published by Ediciones 12 and Página/12 in 1996. From 1997 until 1999, he was responsible for the publishing house Vian Ediciones and manager of the Culture and Entertainment sections of the business daily Buenos Aires Económico (B.A.E.).

His collection of short stories Las griegas (The Greek) was published by Vian Editions in 1999. In the same year he edited the book Najdorf X Najdorf, written by Liliana Najdorf and he edited and wrote a foreword for the anthology Los mejores cuentos argentinos (The best Argentine short stories). He was also the editor in charge of the sections on Literature and Myths of the Twentieth Century of the portal operated by Advance Telecomunicaciones under Telefonica Group.

In 2000 he started working as a reader and consultant of Tusquets Editores Argentina. He edited and wrote the foreword for Cross a la mandíbula, Perón vuelve (Norma) and La selección argentina. Until 2003, he was chief editor of the portal TangoCity.

His novel Lanús was published in 2002. One of his stories Hecha una furia (became a Fury) was included in the German anthology Zerfurchtes Land. Neue Erzählungen aus Argentinien (Furrowed land. New stories from Argentina)(Hainholz-Verlag, Göttingen) published in the same year.

The publisher Tusquets published his novel Filo in 2003. In the same year Olguín edited and wrote the foreword of the book Escritos con sangre (Written in Blood) (published by Standard), an anthology of stories based on Argentine police cases. He also became a member of the governing board of the journal Lamujerdemivida (Thewomanofmylife), of which he would later become the chief editor.

The novel El equipo de los sueños (The dream team) was published in 2003 and won the Premio Destacados awarded by the Asociación Argentina de Literatura Infantil y Juvenil (the Argentine Association for Children's and Youth Literature) in the fiction category. The French translation of El equipo de los sueños was a finalist for the 2006 Prix Libbylit "for best novel in a French language edition" (Brussels).

== Bibliography ==
- Las griegas. Short stories. Sergio S. Olguín, Vian Ediciones, Buenos Aires, 1999.
- Lanús. Novel. Sergio S. Olguín, Editorial Norma, Buenos Aires, 2002.
- Hecha una furia ("Und wurde zur Furie"). Short story. Sergio S. Olguín, in the German language anthology Zerfurchtes Land. Neue Erzählungen aus Argentinien, Burkhard Pohl, Patricio Pron (Hrsg.): Hainholz-Verlag, Göttingen, 2002.
- Filo. Novel. Sergio S. Olguín, Tusquets Editores, Buenos Aires, 2003.
- El equipo de los sueños. Novel. Sergio S. Olguín, Editorial Norma, Buenos Aires, 2004; Siruela, Madrid, 2005; (Translations: Une équipe de rêve, Seuil-Métailié, París, 2006; Die Traummannschaft, Suhrkamp Verlag, Frankfurt, 2006.)
- Springfield. Novel. Sergio S. Olguín, Editorial Norma, Buenos Aires, 2007.
- Oscura monótona de sangre. Novel. Sergio Olguín. Tusquets. Barcelona, 2010.
- La fragilidad de los cuerpos. Novel. Sergio Olguín. Tusquets. Buenos Aires, 2012. [English translation (Miranda France): The Fragility of Bodies. Bitter Lemon Press. London, 2019.]
