= Argentina–Russia relations =

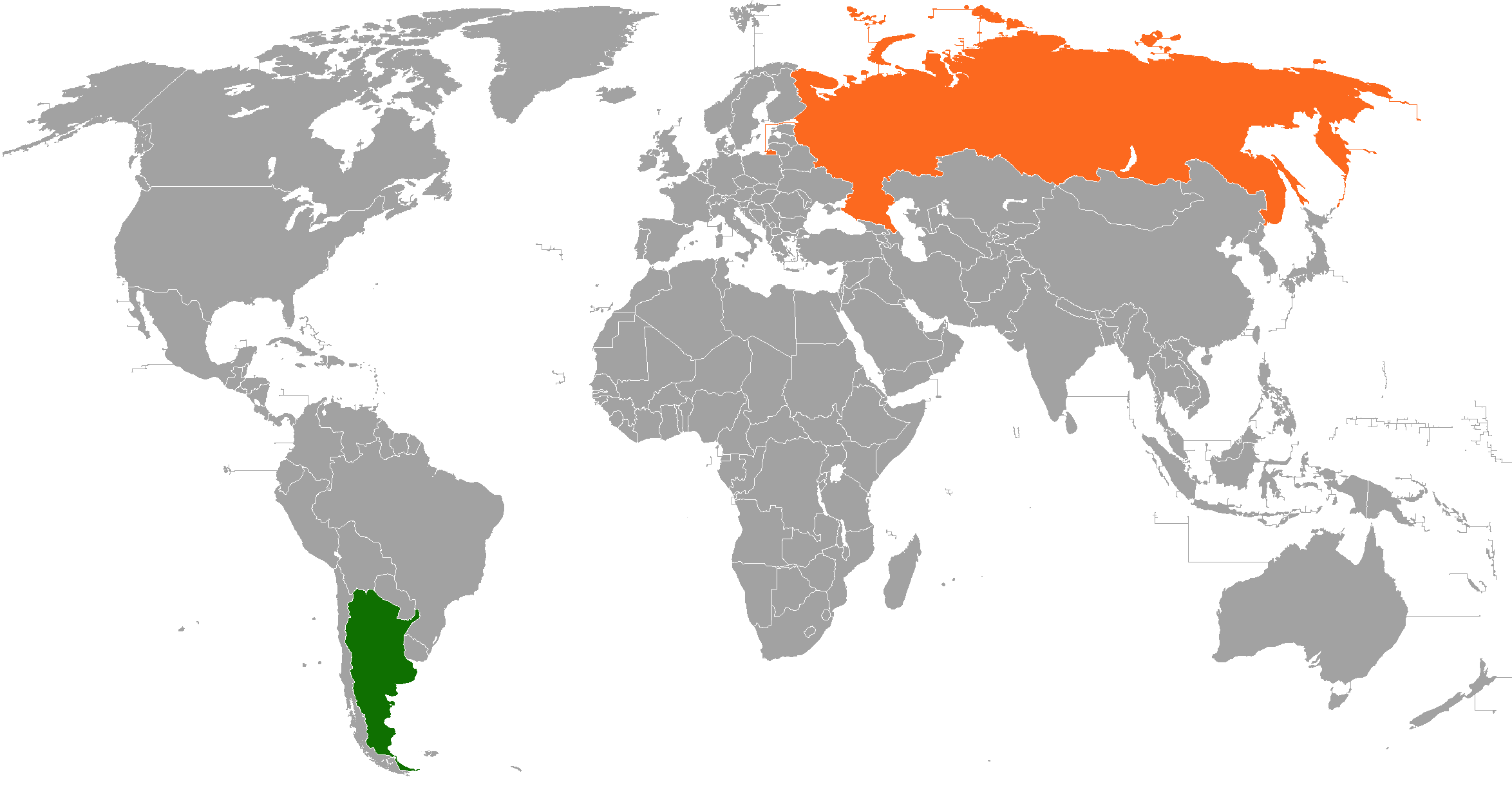
- Argentina: Russia

Current and historical relations between the Argentine Republic and the Russian Federation have existed for decades. Both nations are members of the G20 and the United Nations.

== History ==
In 1866, Russia opened a consulate in Buenos Aires. Diplomatic relations between Argentina and Russia were established on 22 October 1885. Most Russian migrants arrived to Argentina between 1880 and 1921, in three waves. The first wave was caused by events such as the 1905 Russian Revolution; the second wave from the October Revolution of 1917 and the third wave caused by the Russian Revolution that took place between 1917 and 1922. In October 1917, Argentina suspended diplomatic relations with Russia as a result of its revolution. Diplomatic relations were restored with the Soviet Union soon after World War II in 1946.

According to Russian historian Briliov, USSR assisted Argentina in Falklands War with satellite surveillance of the British fleet, which helped in the sinking of HMS Coventry. In 1986, Argentine President, Raúl Alfonsín, paid an official visit to Moscow, the first by an Argentine head-of-state. In December 1991, Argentina recognized the Russian Federation as the successor state of the USSR. In April 2010, Russian President, Dmitry Medvedev, became the first Russian head-of-state to visit Argentina. In April 2015, Russian president Vladimir Putin publicly supported Cristina Fernández and Argentina's claims to the Falkland Islands.

On 24 October 2018, a videoconference was organized between the Friendship Groups of the upper houses of the Russian and Argentine Parliaments. The delegations of the Federation Council and the State Duma took part in the Parliamentary Forum and the Summit of the Presidents of the Group of 20 Parliaments and held bilateral meetings with members of the Argentine Parliament. On 18 June 2019, a second videoconference was held dedicated to the problems of deepening economic integration between Mercosur and the Eurasian Economic Union on the basis of the Memorandum of Understanding signed in December 2018.

Each year, Argentines participate in international law enforcement events held in Russia. From November 2017 to April 2018, the Argentine and Russian military specialists carried out a joint search for the missing Argentine submarine ARA San Juan (S-42) with 44 crew members on board.

Since the inauguration of President Javier Milei in 2023, relations between Argentina and Russia have cooled due to Milei's strong support for Ukraine in the ongoing Russo-Ukrainian War. Bilateral ties deteriorated further in 2026 following revelations that a Russian intelligence-linked network had financed a disinformation campaign targeting the Argentine government in an effort to undermine its public image and influence domestic opinion.

== Invasion of Ukraine ==
In February 2023, the Argentine foreign ministry said in a statement: "Argentina reaffirms its commitment to the principles of sovereignty and territorial integrity of states and human rights, permanent pillars of our country's foreign policy, it rejects the use of force as a mechanism to resolve conflicts and, in this way, reiterates its condemnation of Russia's invasion of Ukrainian territory."

It was reported in February 2023 that Argentine immigration authorities were cracking down on pregnant Russian women who, since the invasion of Ukraine, have started travelling to Buenos Aires to give birth in order to gain Argentine citizenship for their children. Some 10,500 pregnant Russians have arrived in Argentina in the past year, with about 7,000 women returning home after giving birth. The head of Argentina's immigration office said on Twitter that "mafia organizations were profiting by offering packages to obtain our passport to people who do not actually want to reside in our country."

As of July 2023, more than 18,500 Russians have come to the country. Argentina does not require a visa for Russian citizens to enter the country as tourists, and it also allows the parents of children born on Argentinian soil to receive residency.

== High-level visits ==
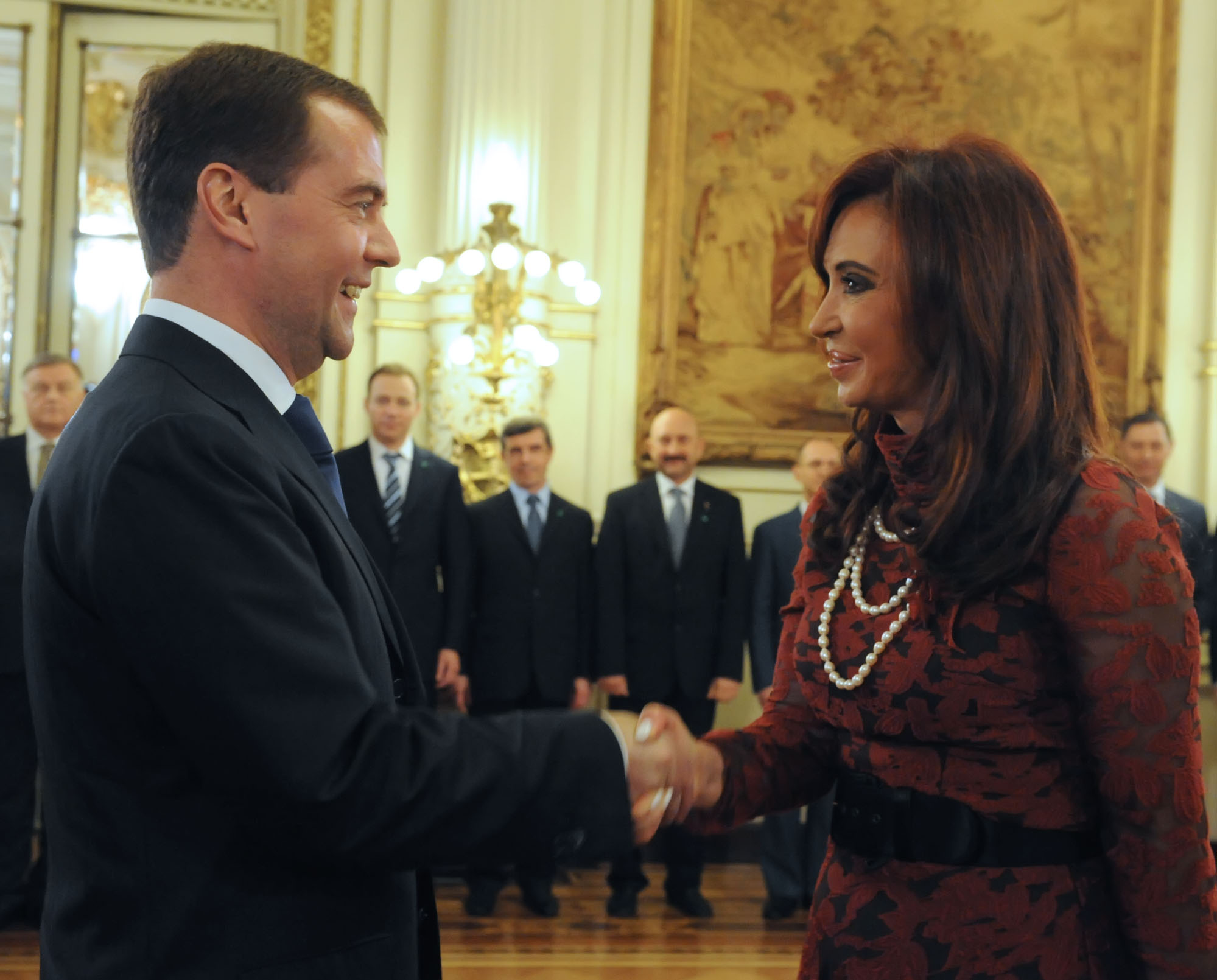
Argentine President Cristina Fernández de Kirchner and Russian President Dmitry Medvedev in Buenos Aires; April 2010.

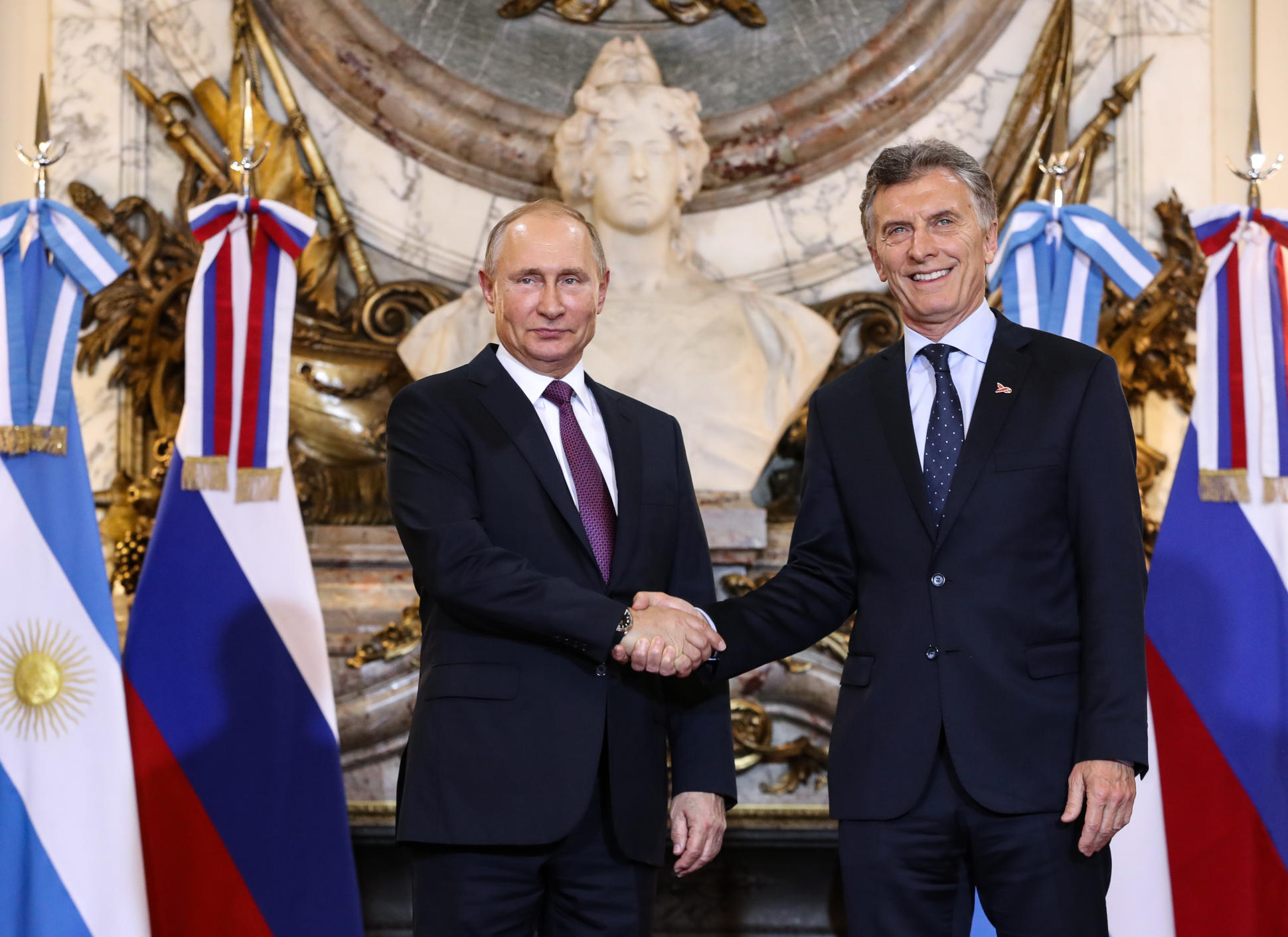
Argentine President Mauricio Macri and Russian President Vladimir Putin in Buenos Aires; December 2018.

High-level visits from Argentina to Russia

- Foreign Minister Dante Caputo (1986)
- President Raúl Alfonsín (1986)
- President Carlos Menem (1990, 1998)
- Foreign Minister Guido di Tella (1994)
- Foreign Minister Adalberto Rodríguez Giavarini (2000)
- Foreign Minister Rafael Bielsa (2004)
- Foreign Minister Jorge Taiana (2006, 2008)
- President Cristina Fernández de Kirchner (2008, 2013, 2015)
- Foreign Minister Héctor Timerman (2011, 2014)
- Foreign Minister Susana Malcorra (2016)
- Foreign Minister Jorge Faurie (2017)
- President Mauricio Macri (2018)
- President Alberto Fernández (2022)

High-level visits from Russia to Argentina

- Foreign Minister Igor Ivanov (1997, 2003)
- Foreign Minister Sergey Lavrov (2006, 2013)
- President Dmitry Medvedev (2010)
- President Vladimir Putin (2014, 2018)

== Bilateral agreements ==
Both nations have signed several bilateral agreements such as an Agreement on Maritime Transport (1974); Agreement to Eliminate Double Taxation in the field of International Maritime and Air Transport (1979); Agreement on Cooperation to Combat Abuse of Illicit Production and Trafficking of Narcotic Drugs (1990); Agreement on Judicial Assistance in Civil Matters (2000); Agreement on technical military cooperation (2004); Agreement on the removal of visa requirements for citizens of both nations (2009); Agreement on mutual legal assistance in criminal matters (2014); Extradition treaty (2014); Agreement on transfer of convicted persons for the completion of criminal sentences (2014); Agreement of cooperation on the peaceful uses of nuclear energy (2014); and an Agreement on the mutual protection of secret information in the field of technical-military cooperation (2015).

== Resident diplomatic missions ==
- Argentina has an embassy in Moscow.
- Russia has an embassy in Buenos Aires.

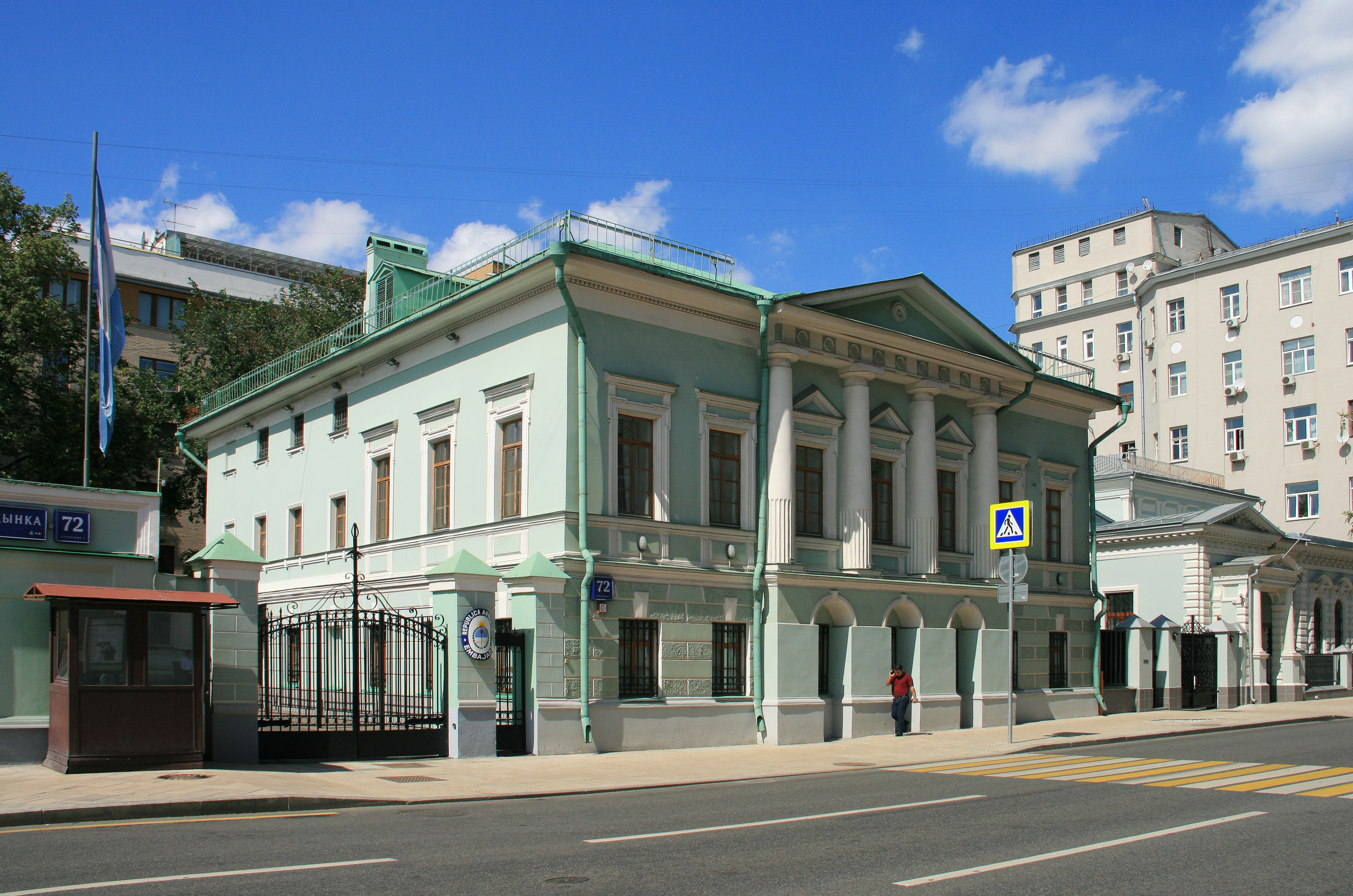
Embassy of Argentina in Moscow

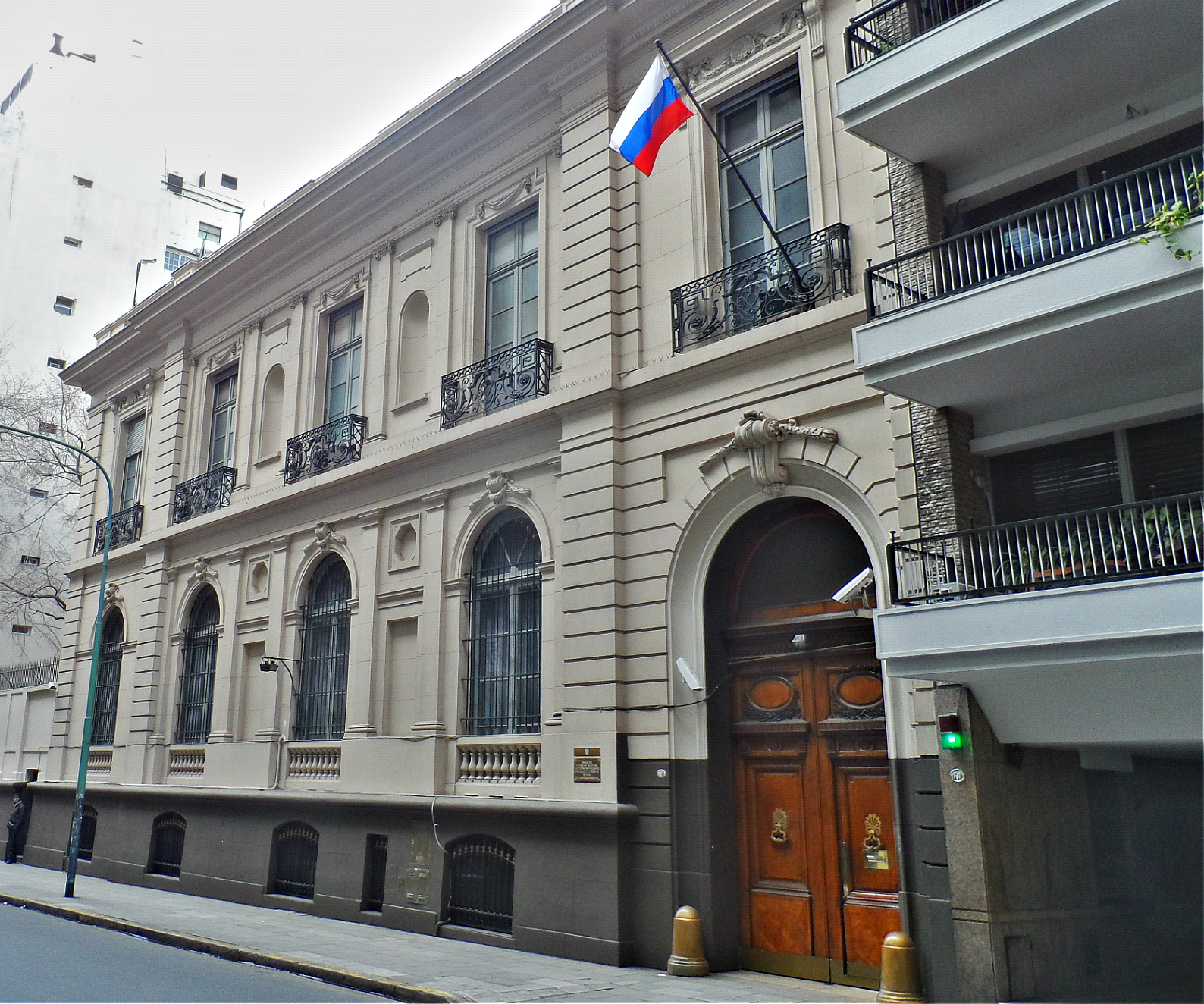
Embassy of Russia in Buenos Aires

== See also ==
- Foreign relations of Argentina
- Foreign relations of Russia
- Russian Argentines
