= Cathedral of the Most Holy Trinity, Buenos Aires =

Church building in Buenos Aires, Argentina

Coordinates: 34°37′30″S 58°22′12″W

Catedral de la Santísima Trinidad
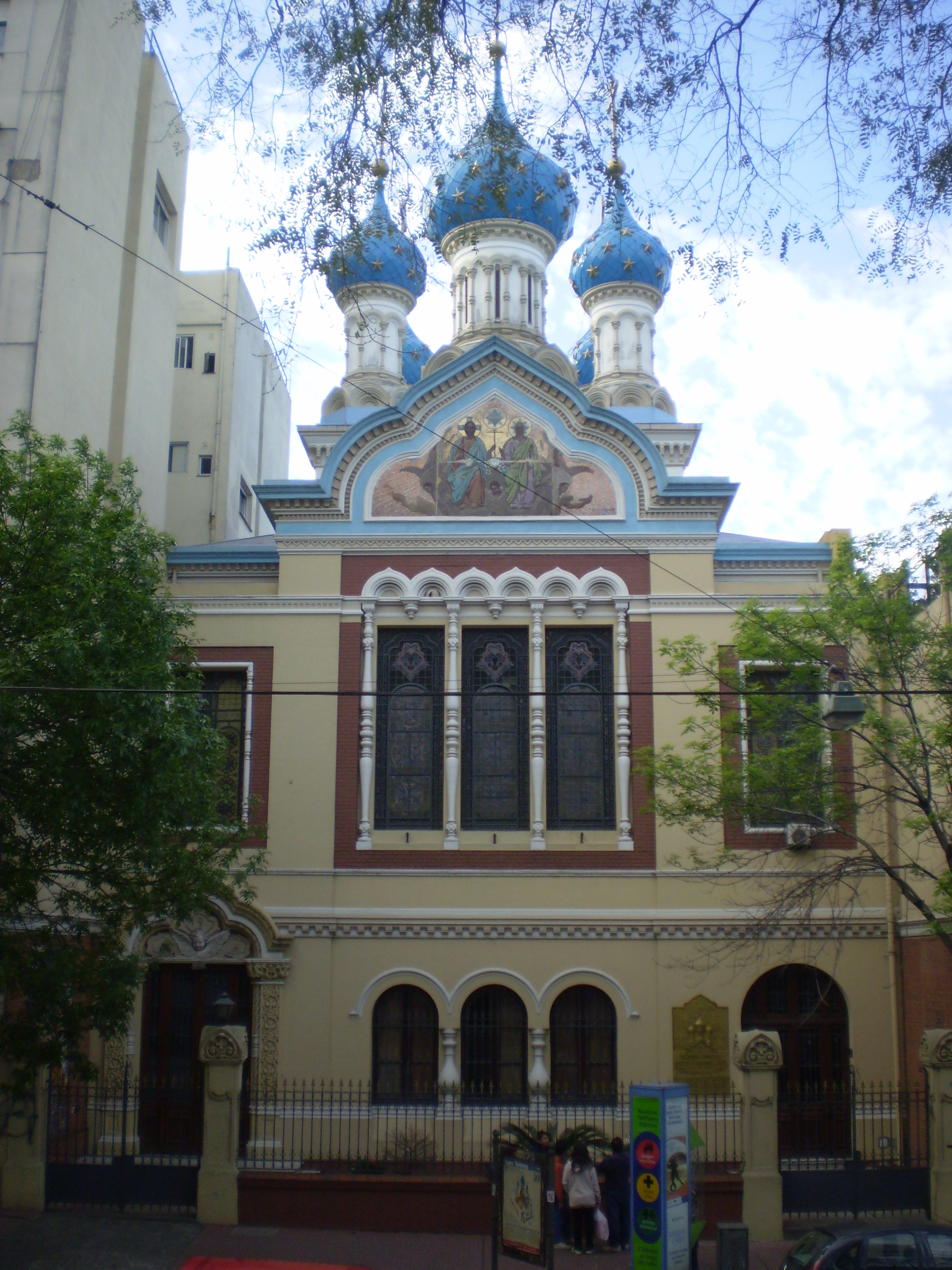

Religion
- Affiliation: Russian Orthodox
- Year consecrated: 1901

Location
- Location: Brasil 315; Buenos Aires, Argentina
- Interactive map of Catedral de la Santísima Trinidad

Architecture
- Architect: Alejandro Christophersen
- National Historic Monument of Argentina

The Russian Orthodox Cathedral of the Most Holy Trinity (Spanish: Catedral Ortodoxa Rusa de la Santísima Trinidad) is an Eastern Orthodox church building in Buenos Aires, Argentina. Located in the neighborhood of San Telmo, in front of Lezama Park.

== History ==
In front of the Argentine National Historical Museum, is this structure, designed in Saint Petersburg by the architect of the Most Holy Synod of Russia, Mikhail Preobrazensky, started in 1898, and finally built and adapted in 1901, and honorably, by the Norwegian architect (based in Argentina) Alejandro Christophersen, in collaboration with the engineer Pedro Coni. The funds for its construction were donated by Russia.

It is currently an Argentine National Historic Monument.

== Structure ==
Neo-Byzantine Architecture and Neo-Russian Style

The church consists of a plot of 2352 ft and 53 ft wide (716.6 m^{2} and 16 m) by 144 ft deep (44 m).

It is designed in a typical 17th-century Russian style, with five blue Onion domes and golden stars, crowned by Orthodox crosses attached with chains pointing to the east.

On its sides you can see two murals, one called "Baptism of Russia" and another with motifs about the Theotokos, Jesus and Saint John.

Finally, on the front, a bronze bas-relief reproduces the facade of the church.

The temple is on the second floor of the structure, and it is accessed through a richly decorated door to the left of the facade. Its altar is intentionally oriented towards the east, it also has several icons, highlighting among all the one dedicated to the Holy Trinity, which gives the church its name. To the left of the altar, is the space for the choir.

== See also ==
- Russian Orthodox Church in Argentina
- Russians in Argentina
