= Flamethrower (disambiguation) =

A flamethrower is a weapon that projects long streaks of flames.

- See List of flamethrowers

It can also refer to:

- Flame tank, a tank that does the same effect as a flamethrower
- Flamethrower radio station, another name for a clear-channel radio station
- "Flamethrower" (song), a song by J. Geils Band on their album Freeze Frame
- "Flamethrower", a song by King Gizzard & the Lizard Wizard on their album PetroDragonic Apocalypse
- Flamethrower (album), 2000 album by Chicago Underground Trio
- A model of brightly colored salmon fly, from its appearance

== See also ==
- Flamethrower palm, a name for the plant Chambeyronia macrocarpa.
- Greek fire, a Byzantine weapon
- The Flamethrowers (Arlt novel), a 1931 novel by Roberto Arlt
- The Flamethrowers (Kushner novel), a 2013 novel by American author Rachel Kushner
