= The Flamethrowers (Arlt novel) =

1931 novel by Roberto Arlt

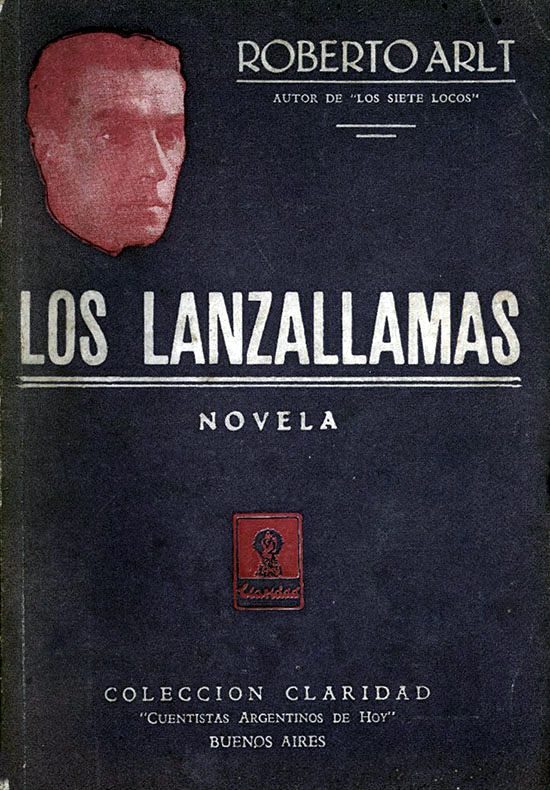
- First edition cover
- Author: Roberto Arlt
- Original title: Los lanzallamas
- Language: Spanish
- Genre: Novel
- Publisher: Editorial Claridad
- Publication date: 1931
- Publication place: Argentina
- Media type: Print (paperback)
- Pages: 310 pp (first edition, paperback)
- ISBN: 9780965475693 (first edition, paperback)
- Preceded by: The Seven Madmen
- Followed by: El amor brujo

The Flamethrowers (Spanish: Los lanzallamas) is a novel by the Argentine writer Roberto Arlt, that continues the story of Remo Erdosain, a lowlife criminal who, plagued by vital anxieties, joins a secret society, and was first introduced in the novel Los siete locos.

The book was published by Editorial Claridad in Buenos Aires in 1931. It was included in the second volume of Novelas completas y cuentos (English: Complete Novels and Stories) published by Compañía General Fabril Editora in Buenos Aires in 1963. It was published by Compañía General Fabril Editora in Buenos Aires in 1968 and 1972, and by Editorial Losada in Buenos Aires in about 1977. It was published by Bruguera in Barcelona in 1980.

The book was translated into French by Lucien Mercier and published under the title Les lance-flammes by Belfond in Paris in 1983. It was translated into German by Bruno Keller and published under the title Die Flammenwerfer by Insel Verlag in 1973. It was translated into Italian by Luigi Pellisari and published under the title I lanciafiamme by Bompiani in Milan in 1974. The novel was translated into English by Larry Riley as The Flamethowers and published in 2021 by corona\samizdat (Slovenia), with an introduction by the press's publisher Rick Harsch.

It has been said that Los lanzallamas is title of the second installment of a single novel, the first instalment having been published in 1929 under the title Los siete locos. or an "unofficial" sequel to, Los siete locos. Nevertheless, contrary opinions have also been stated.

The Flamethrowers has been called a "fully realized" masterpiece. Characters in the book include Erdosain, Hipolita and Arturo Haffner.
