= Alejandro Christophersen =

Argentine architect & artist (1866–1946)

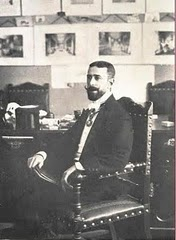
- Alejandro Christophersen
- Born: 1866; Cádiz, Spain
- Died: 1946 (aged 79–80); Buenos Aires, Argentina
- Known for: Architect and Artist
- Notable work: Anchorena Palace

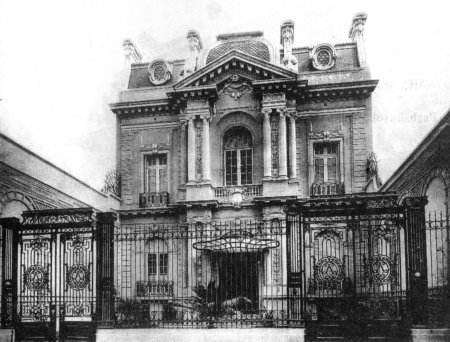
Círculo Italiano

Alejandro Christophersen (1866–1946) was an Argentine architect and artist who designed many important buildings in the city of Buenos Aires, including the renowned Anchorena Palace.

== Biography ==
Christophersen was born in Cádiz, Spain in 1866, the son of the Norwegian diplomat Otto Thorvald Alexander Christophersen, Consul to Spain. He studied architecture in Belgium and art in Paris. In 1888 he arrived in Argentina, and settled in Buenos Aires, during his career as an architect he gave the port city many of its most important buildings.

He was a professor at the School of Architecture of the Faculty of Natural and Exact Sciences at the University of Buenos Aires, he is considered to be one of the central figures of eclectic architecture in Argentina, where he was one of the founder members of the Central Society of Architects. His earlier works were influenced by French Second Empire architecture, though his later projects were Rationalist.

Christophersen was also an accomplished painter, and became well known for his impressionist portraits of local society ladies. He died in Buenos Aires in 1946.

== Works ==
His most important works include:

- Astoria Hotel at 902 Avenida de Mayo, 1895.
- Façade of Café Tortoni in Avenida de Mayo, 1898.
- Private residence for Adela Unzué de Leloir at 1264 Libertad street, 1903 (since 1944 the headquarters of Círcolo Italiano).
- Russian Orthodox Church of the Holy Trinity at 323 Brasil street, 1905.
- Construction of Anchorena Palace at 761 Arenales street for the family of Mercedes Castellanos de Anchorena (today the headquarters of the Ministry of Foreign Affairs), 1910.
- Headquarters for the Argentine Association of Actors at 1762 Adolfo Alsina street, 1914.
- Buenos Aires Stock Exchange at 299 Sarmiento street, inaugurated 1916.
- Basílica of Santa Rosa de Lima at the junction of Belgrano Avenue and Pasco street, 1928–34.
- Transradio Building, Corrientes Avenue, 1940.
- Hotel Marcel de Buenos Aires - Calle Venezuela - 2763/65 - 1 de 3 casas de renta - 1898

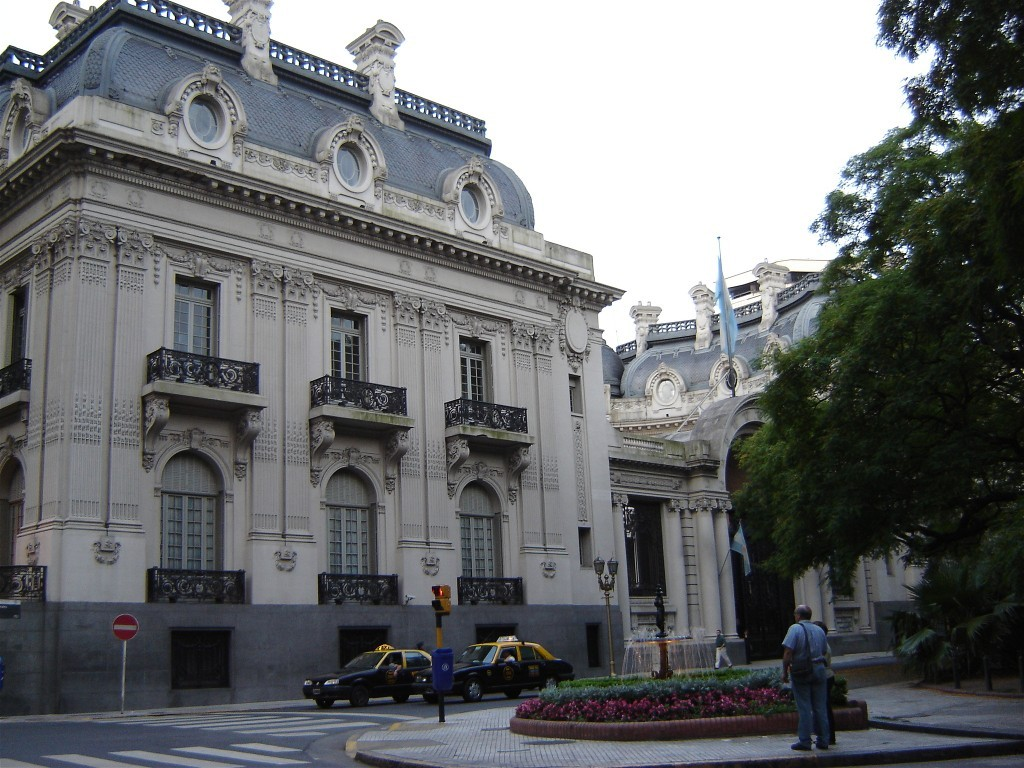
San Martín Palace

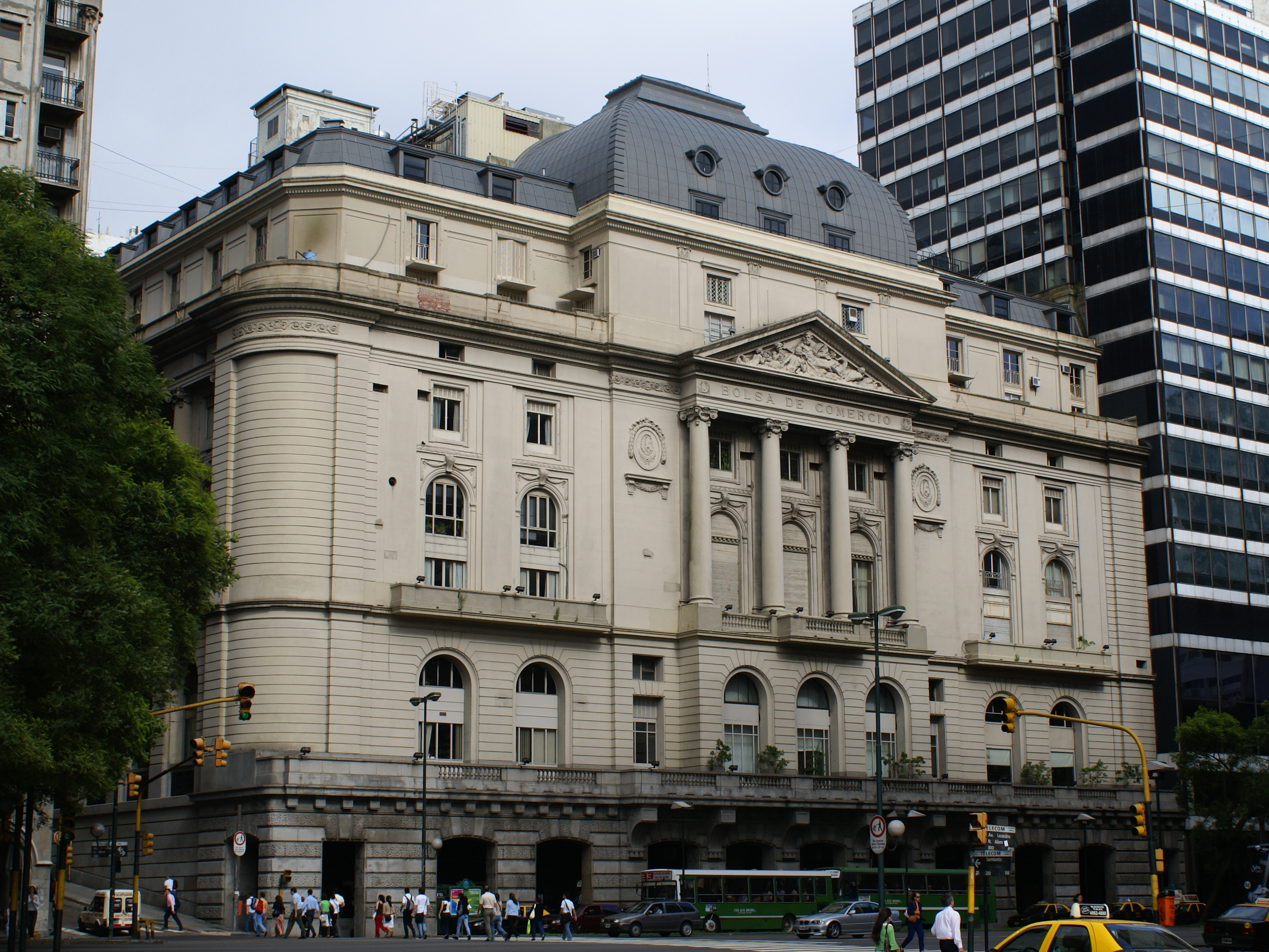
Buenos Aires Stock Exchange

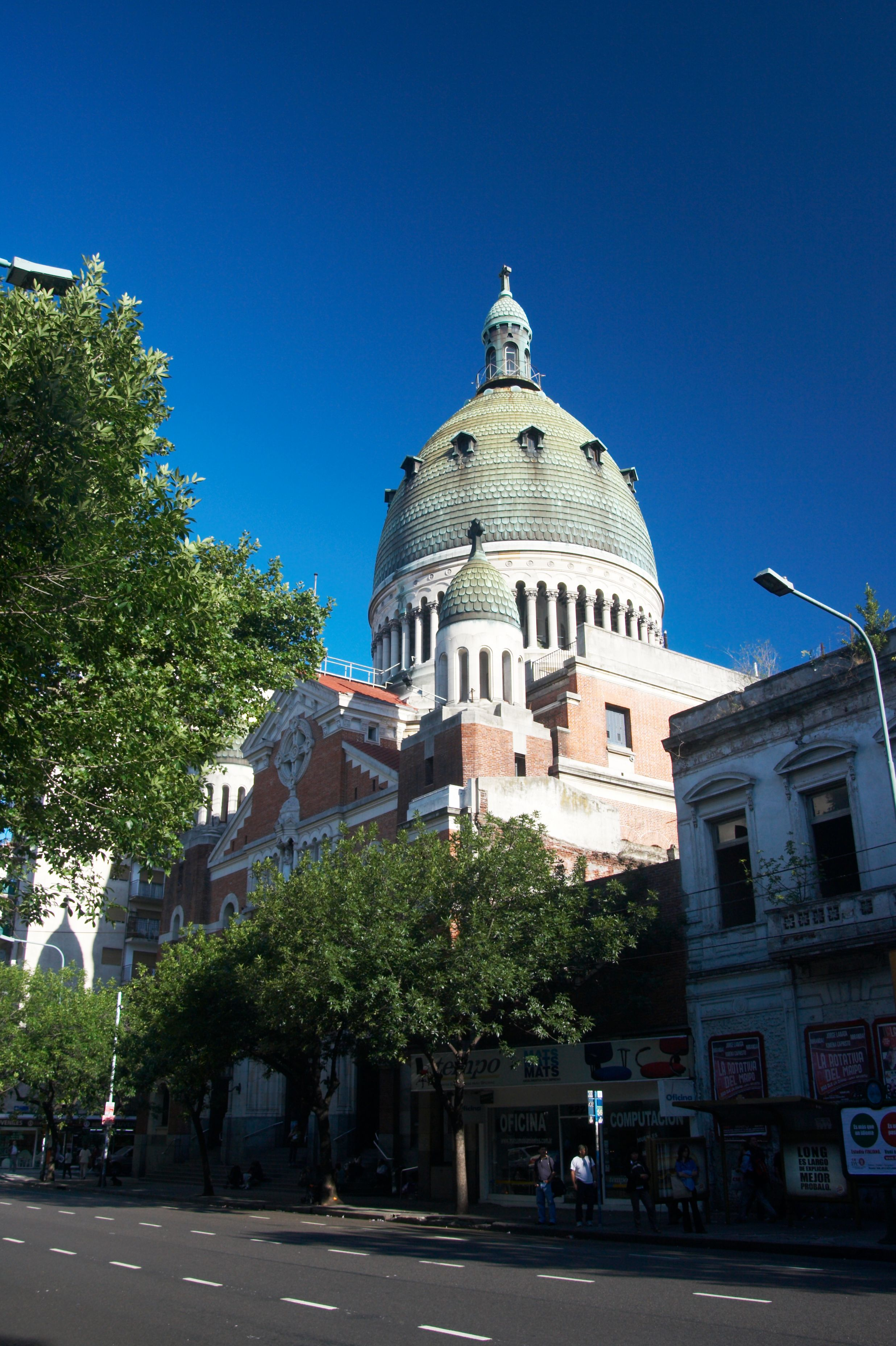
Basilica of Santa Rosa de Lima

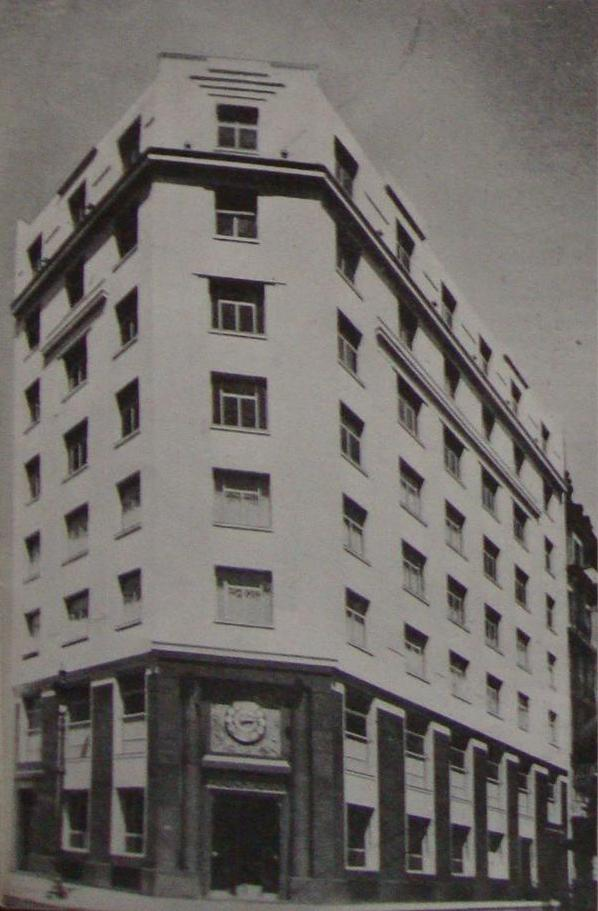
Transradio Building
