= Mirta Arlt =

Argentine writer, translator, professor and researcher

Electra Mirta Arlt
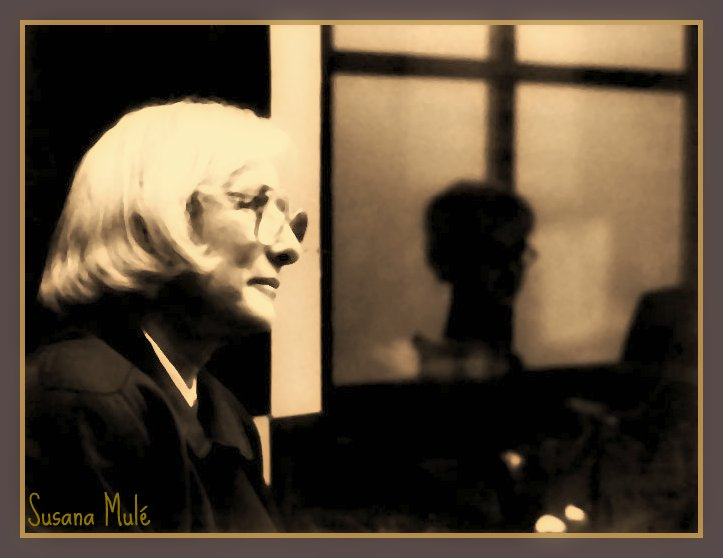
- Arlt in 2008
- Born: 25 January 1923; Córdoba, Argentina
- Died: 12 November 2014 (aged 91)
- Occupations: Writer; Professor
- Parent: Roberto Arlt

Academic background
- Education: National University of Córdoba

Academic work
- Discipline: Theater
- Institutions: University of Buenos Aires; UNLZ

Electra Mirta Arlt (25 January 1923 – 12 November 2014) was an Argentine writer, translator, professor and researcher specializing in theater. She was the daughter of the writer, Roberto Arlt.

== Early life and education ==
Mirta Arlt was born in Córdoba, the daughter of Roberto Arlt and Carmen Antinucci. She married twice, first at the age of 15, and again at the age of 18. She completed her studies at National University of Córdoba in 1949, becoming a Professor of Language and Literature.

== Career ==
Arlt taught in several national universities, including University of Buenos Aires and National University of Lomas de Zamora. She wrote numerous papers and books, including the novel El sobreviviente, in 1973, for which she was honored. She also wrote numerous essays on the work of her father, and forewords to several of his works, such as Los siete locos, 300 millones, La juerga de los polichinelas and El desierto entra a la ciudad, among others. Arlt worked on film adaptations of two of her father's works, Los siete locos (1973), and El juguete rabioso (1984). Arlt died in 2014, at the age of 91, of a heart attack. Her remains were buried in Cementerio de la Chacarita.

== Selected works ==
- El teatro como fenómeno colectivo (1967)
- El sobreviviente (1973)
- Prólogos a la obra de mi padre (1985)
- Para leer a Roberto Arlt (1984, in collaboration with Omar Borré)
- La verdadera historia del pañuelito blanco y Antígona (1994)

== Honors ==
- Municipal prize for novels, El sobreviviente (1970)
- Raul Doblas award, presented by Argentores (1971)
