= El amor brujo (novel) =

1932 novel by Roberto Arlt

El amor brujo ("Love The Magician") is the last novel by Argentinian writer Roberto Arlt, published in 1932. It tells the story of an affair between a married man called Balder and a music student called Irene in Buenos Aires, shortly before the 1930 Argentine coup d'état. It is dedicated to Arlt's wife.

== Style ==
El amor brujo has been described as "strongly political and nihilistic: intimate relationships are portrayed as being largely fantasy or lie".

== Reception ==
The novel was not well received critically or popularly, and is the least-known of Arlt's four novels.

== Works ==
- Jordan, Paul (1999). ""But my writing has nothing to do with Arlt's": Trace and Silence of Arlt in Onetti". In Gustavo San Román (ed.). Onetti and Others: Comparative Essays on a Major Figure in Latin American Literature. SUNY Press. pp. 65–82. ISBN 978-0-7914-4236-4.
- Jordan, Paul (2014). "Alrt, Robert". In Smith, Verity (ed.). Concise Encyclopedia of Latin American Literature. Taylor & Francis. pp. 35–36. ISBN 978-1-135-96033-9.
- Shaw, Donald L. (2002). A Companion to Modern Spanish American Fiction. Boydell & Brewer Ltd. p. 79. ISBN 978-1-85566-078-6.
