= The Seven Madmen =

1973 film

- Directed by: Leopoldo Torre Nilsson
- Screenplay by: Mirta Arlt; Beatriz Guido; Luis Pico Estrada; Leopoldo Torre Nilsson
- Based on: Los siete locos and Los lanzallamas by Roberto Arlt
- Produced by: Leopoldo Torre Nilsson
- Starring: Alfredo Alcón; Norma Aleandro; Héctor Alterio; Thelma Biral; Sergio Renán; Osvaldo Terranova
- Cinematography: Aníbal Di Salvo
- Edited by: Armando Blanco; Antonio Ripoll
- Music by: Mariano Etkin; Osvaldo Requena
- Production company: Producciones Cinematográficas Litoral S.A.C.I.F.I.
- Distributed by: Contracuadro
- Release date: 1973
- Running time: 118 minutes
- Country: Argentina
- Language: Spanish

The Seven Madmen (Spanish: Los siete locos, also known as The Revolution of the Seven Madmen) is a 1973 Argentine drama film directed by Leopoldo Torre Nilsson and starring Alfredo Alcón, Norma Aleandro and Héctor Alterio. It was based on the novels Los siete locos (The Seven Madmen) and Los lanzallamas (The Flamethowers), by Roberto Arlt. The film was entered into the 23rd Berlin International Film Festival, where it won the Silver Bear Award.

== Cast ==
- Alfredo Alcón as Remo Erdosain
- Norma Aleandro as Hipólita, Ergueta's wife
- Héctor Alterio as Gregorio Barsut
- Thelma Biral as Elsa, Erdosain's wife
- Sergio Renán as Haffner, "El Rufián Melancólico"
- José Slavin as "El Astrólogo"
- Osvaldo Terranova as Ángel Ergueta
- Leonor Manso as "La bizca"
- Lilian Riera as Mother of "La bizca"
- Luis Politti as Bromberg, "El hombre que vio a la partera"
- Noemí Granata
- Oscar Pedemonti
- Saul Jarlip
- Jorge Povarché
- Mario Nervi
- Laura Conte
