= Roberto Arlt =

Argentine writer (1900–1942)

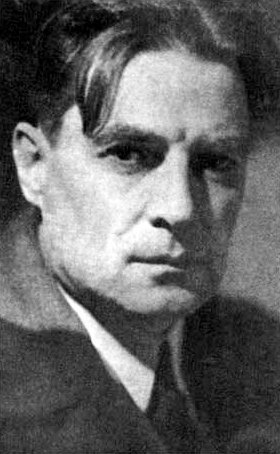
- Born: 26 April 1900; Buenos Aires, Argentina
- Died: 26 July 1942 (aged 42); Buenos Aires, Argentina
- Resting place: Ashes scattered in Paraná River
- Occupations: Novelist, dramatist and journalist
- Spouse(s): Carmen Antinucci (died in 1940); Elizabeth Shine
- Children: Mirta Electra, Roberto
- Writing career
- Language: Spanish
- Subject: Argentine literature

Roberto Arlt (April 2, 1900 – July 26, 1942) was an Argentine novelist, storyteller, playwright, and journalist.

== Biography ==
Roberto Godofredo Christophersen Arlt was born in Buenos Aires on April 2, 1900. His parents were both immigrants. His father, Karl Arlt, was from Posen (now Poznań in present-day Poland) and his mother was Ekatherine Lobstraibitzer, born in the Austro-Hungarian Empire, a native of Trieste and Italian speaking. German was the language commonly used at their home. His relationship with his father was stressful, as Karl Arlt was a very severe and austere man, by Arlt's own account. The memory of his oppressive father would appear in several of his writings. For example, Remo Erdosain (a character at least partially based on Arlt's own life) often recalls his abusive father and how little if any support he would give him. After being expelled from school at the age of eight, Arlt became an autodidact and worked at all sorts of different odd jobs before landing a job at a local newspaper: a clerk at a bookstore, apprentice to a tinsmith, painter, mechanic, welder, manager in a brick factory, and dock worker.

His first novel, El juguete rabioso (1926) ("Mad Toy"), was the semi-autobiographical story of Silvio, a dropout who goes through a series of adventures trying to be "somebody." Narrated by Silvio's older self, the novel reflects the energy and chaos of the early 20th century in Buenos Aires. The narrator's literary and sometimes poetic language contrasts sharply with the street-level slang of Mad Toy's many colorful characters.

Arlt's second novel, the popular Los siete locos (The Seven Madmen) was rough, brutal, colloquial, and surreal, a complete break from the polite, middle-class literature more typical of Argentine literature. Los lanzallamas (The Flame-Throwers) was the sequel, and these two novels together are thought by many to be his greatest work. What followed were a series of short stories and plays in which Arlt pursued his vision of bizarre, half-mad, alienated characters pursuing insane quests in a landscape of urban chaos. In 1932 he published El amor brujo.

During his lifetime, however, Arlt was best known for his "Aguafuertes" ("Etchings"), the result of his contributions as a columnist - between 1928 and 1942 - to the Buenos Aires daily "El Mundo". Arlt used these columns to comment, in his characteristically forthright and unpretentious style, on the peculiarities, hypocrisies, strangeness, and beauty of everyday life in Argentina's capital. These articles included occasional exposés of public institutions, such as the juvenile justice system ("Escuela primaria de delincuencia", 26–29 September 1932) or the Public Health System. Some of the "Aguafuertes" were collected in two volumes under the titles Secretos femeninos. Aguafuertes inéditas and Tratado de delincuencia. Aguafuertes inéditas which were edited by Sergio Olguín and published by Ediciones 12 and Página/12 in 1996.

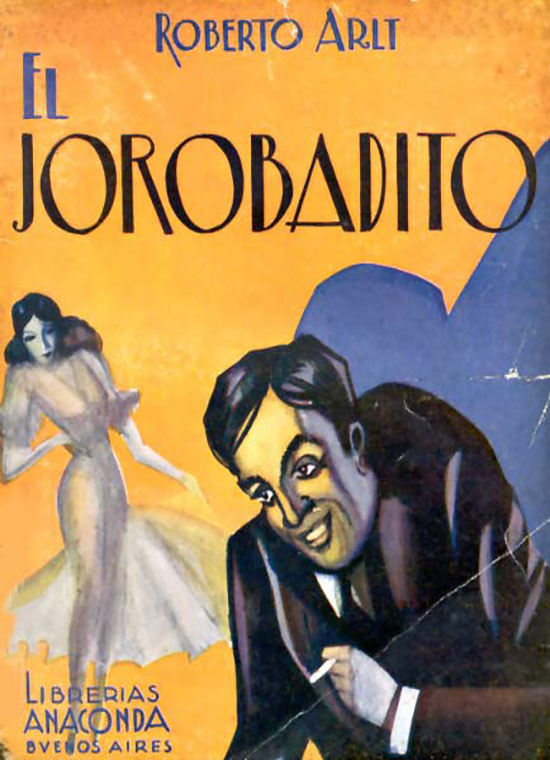
El Jorobadito - Cover First Edition - 1933

Between March and May 1930, Arlt wrote a series of "Aguafuertes" as a correspondent to "El Mundo" in Rio de Janeiro. In 1935 he spent nearly a year writing as he traveled throughout Spain and North Africa, on the eve of the Spanish Civil War. At the time of his death, Arlt was hoping to be sent to the United States as a correspondent.

Worn out and exhausted after a lifetime of hardships, he died from a stroke on July 26, 1942. His coffin was lowered from his apartment by an operated crane, an ironic end, considering his bizarre stories.

Arlt has been massively influential on Latin American literature, including the 1960s "Boom" generation of writers such as Gabriel García Márquez. "Let's say, modestly, that Arlt is Jesus Christ," propounded Roberto Bolaño. Analogues in English literature are those who avoid literary 'respectability' by writing about the poor, the criminal and the mad: writers like William Burroughs, Iceberg Slim, and Irvine Welsh. Arlt, however, predated all of them. He is widely considered to be one of the founders of the modern Argentine novel; among those contemporary writers who claim to have been influenced by Arlt are Abelardo Castillo, Ricardo Piglia and César Aira. At least two Argentine movies were based on his novels, Los siete locos (1974) and El juguete rabioso (1985). Peter Damian Bellis, an editor of the independent press River Boat Books of Minneapolis, became resolved to make Los siete locos and Los lanzallamas available together in English translation. Although a plan to publish the two closely linked novels in the same volume initially proved unfeasible, The Seven Madmen and The Flamethrowers, respectively translated by Naomi Lindstrom and Larry Riley, appeared simultaneously in July 2018. River Boat's combined edition of both novels eventually appeared in January 2022 under the title Madmen in Revolt. In 2002 Duke University Press published Mad Toy translated and introduced by Michele McKay Aynesworth.

== Novels ==
- El diario de un morfinómano (1920) (Diary of a Morphimaniac) - (lost)
- El juguete rabioso (1926) (Mad Toy)
- Los siete locos (1929) (Seven Madmen)
- Los lanzallamas (1931) (The Flame-Throwers)
- El amor brujo (1932) (Bewitching Love)

== Plays ==
- El humillado (1930)
- 300 millones (1932)
- Prueba de amor (1932)
- Escenas de un grotesco (1934)
- Saverio el Cruel (1936)
- El fabricante de fantasmas (1936)
- La isla desierta (1937)
- Separación feroz (1938)
- África (1938)
- La fiesta del hierro (1940)
- El desierto entra a la ciudad (1952) (posthumous)
- La cabeza separada del tronco (1964) (posthumous)
- El amor brujo (1971) (posthumous)

== Short story collections ==
- El jorobadito (1933) (The Little Hunchback)
- El criador de gorilas (1941) (The Gorilla Handler)

== Journalism ==
- Aguafuertes porteñas (1933) (Etchings from Buenos Aires)
- Aguafuertes españolas (1936) (Etchings from Spain)
- Nuevas aguafuertes españolas (1960) (New Etchings from Spain)
- Secretos femeninos. Aguafuertes inéditas (1996) (Female Secrets. Unpublished Etchings)
- Tratado de delincuencia. Aguafuertes inéditas (1996) (Treatise on Delinquency. Unpublished Etchings)
- Al margen del cable. Crónicas publicadas en El Nacional, México, 1937-1941 (2003) (On the Margin of Cables. Chronicles Published in El Nacional, México, 1937-1941)
