= Argentine Academy of Motion Picture Arts and Sciences =

Defunct film industry association

- Academia de Artes y Ciencias Cinematográficas de la Argentina
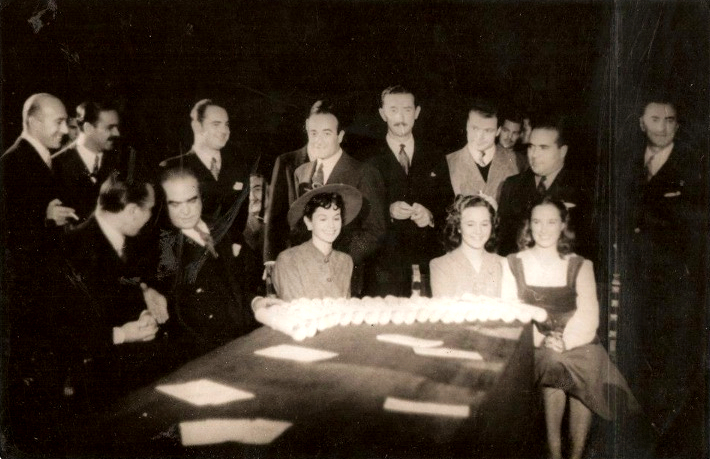
- View of the first Argentine Academy Awards in 1942, with Orson Welles, Enrique Muiño, Delia Garcés, María Duval, Mirtha Legrand, Mario Soffici, Luis Saslavsky, Francisco Múgica and Sebastián Chiola in the crowd.
- Formation: 1941
- Dissolved: 1955
- Type: Professional association
- Headquarters: Buenos Aires
- Region served: Argentina
- Official language: Spanish
- President: Mario Soffici

The Argentine Academy of Motion Picture Arts and Sciences (Spanish: Academia de Artes y Ciencias Cinematográficas de la Argentina) was an Argentine film industry association founded in 1941—during the Golden Age of Argentine cinema—as a local counterpart to the U.S. academy of the same name. The organization emerged from an initiative of the First Argentine Cinematographic Museum (Spanish: Primer Museo Cinematográfico Argentino), a film collection and dissemination project founded by Manuel Peña Rodríguez, a renowned critic at La Nación. Inspired by and based on the Hollywood organization, Peña Rodríguez conceived the Argentine Academy alongside fellow critic Chas de Cruz, a supporting member of the Museum. The Academy was founded as a non-profit organization, divided into branches that grouped members by their craft, such as directors, cinematographers, production designers, composers, and laboratory technicians, among others, with each branch electing its representatives. Like its American counterpart, the Academy presented its own annual film awards, regarded as Argentina's equivalent of the Oscars. The first edition of the awards, which honored 1941 productions, took place in 1942 and was attended by Orson Welles.

== Foundation ==
The First Film Museum of Argentina encouraged the foundation of the original Argentine Academy of Motion Picture Arts and Sciences. Manuel Peña Rodriguez and Chas de Cruz, members of the museum outlined an approach based on the organization and experience of the similar Academy of Motion Picture Arts and Sciences in Hollywood. The basic idea was to organize members of each specialty into associations that would form the different branches of the Academy. They would then nominate delegates to meet and establish the academy. The task proved difficult, since only producers, exhibitors and actors had associations. Peña and Chas had to meet with directors, cinematographers, sound engineers, musicians and so on and persuade them to organize. Eventually the delegates met on 22 November 1941 at the headquarters of the First Film Museum and agreed to establish the academy.

== History ==
The first officers included the director and actor Mario Soffici as president, and the journalist and writer Chas de Cruz and businessman Carlos Connio Santini as secretaries. The Academy was born a year before the Film Critics Association (Asociación de Cronistas Cinematográficos), but began to present awards for local productions a year later, in 1943. The film selected for the Cóndor prize for production that year was Juvenilia by Augusto César Vatteone, while the prize for director went to Soffici for Tres hombres del río.

Over the years, and during the peak of Peronism, the academy became increasingly politicized. However, until 1949 the academy agreed with the main entry of the critics, and it again agreed with the critics in 1951 and 1952. Throughout the first period the academy was accused of being a political lobby whose members were favored by the state in getting credit for unexposed film, which was scarce. The last set of Academy Awards was presented in 1954, shortly before the 1955 coup that ousted the Peronists. Some of the academy members had to leave the country, such as Luis César Amadori, author of classics such as Dios se lo pague (God will pay) and Nacha Regules.

== Awards ==
The awards given by the academy for films made in 1941-54 were as follows:

Award	Year	Winner	Film
Best Picture	1941	Lumiton	Los martes orquídeas
Best Picture	1942	Artistas Argentinos Asociados	La guerra gaucha
Best Picture	1943	Estudios San Miguel	Juvenilia
Best Picture	1944	Artistas Argentinos Asociados	Su mejor alumno
Best Picture	1945	Estudios San Miguel	La dama duende
Best Picture	1946	Argentina Sono Film	Celos
Best Picture	1947	Argentina Sono Film	Albéniz
Best Picture	1948	Argentina Sono Film	Dios se lo pague
Best Picture	1949	Argentina Sono Film	Almafuerte
Best Picture	1950	Argentina Sono Film	Nacha Regules
Best Picture	1951	Estudios San Miguel	Los isleros
Best Picture	1952	Hugo del Carril-Barbieri	Las aguas bajan turbias
Best Picture	1953	Argentina Sono Film	La mujer de las camelias
Best director	1941	Luis Saslavsky	Historia de una noche
Best director	1942	Lucas Demare	La guerra gaucha
Best director	1943	Mario Soffici	Tres hombres del río
Best director	1944	Lucas Demare	Su mejor alumno
Best director	1947	Luis César Amadori	Albéniz
Best director	1948	Luis César Amadori	Dios se lo pague
Best director	1949	Daniel Tinayre	Danza del fuego
Best director	1950	Luis César Amadori	Nacha Regules
Best director	1951	Lucas Demare	Los isleros
Best director	1952	Hugo del Carril	Las aguas bajan turbias
Best director	1953	Ernesto Arancibia	La mujer de las camelias
Best original story	1941	Sixto Pondal Ríos and Carlos Olivari	Los martes orquídeas
Best original story	1942	Hugo Mac Dougall	Malambo
Best original story	1943	Rodolfo González Pacheco, Hugo Mac Dougall and Eliseo Montaine	Tres hombres del río
Best original story	1944	Ulyses Petit de Murat and Homero Manzi	Su mejor alumno
Best original story	1947	Alejandro Verbitzky and Emilio Villalba Welsh	El retrato
Best original story	1948	Ulyses Petit de Murat	Tierra del Fuego
Best original story	1949	Pedro Miguel Obligado and Belisario García Villar	Almafuerte
Best original story	1950	Homero Manzi	El último payador
Best original story	1951	Sixto Pondal Ríos and Carlos Olivari	Pasó en mi barrio
Best original story	1952	Rodolfo M. Taboada	Rescate de sangre
Best original story	1953	Sixto Pondal Ríos and Carlos Olivari	Dock Sud
Best adaptation	1941	Luis Saslavsky and Carlos Adén	Historia de una noche
Best adaptation	1942	Ulyses Petit de Murat and Homero Manzi	La guerra gaucha
Best adaptation	1943	Pedro E. Pico	Juvenilia
Best adaptation	1944	Alejandro Verbitzky and Emilio Villalba Welsh	El deseo
Best adaptation	1947	Carlos Borcosque	Corazón
Best adaptation	1948	Pedro Miguel Obligado	Historia de una mala mujer
Best adaptation	1949	Ariel Cortazzo and Enrique Cahen Salaberry	Avivato
Best adaptation	1950	Lucas Demare	La culpa la tuvo el otro
Best adaptation	1951	Lucas Demare and Ernesto L. Castro	Los isleros
Best adaptation	1952	Alejandro Casona	Si muero antes de despertar
Best adaptation	1953	Abel Santa Cruz	La mejor del colegio
Best Actress	1941	Delia Garcés	Veinte años y una noche
Best Actress	1942	Delia Garcés	Malambo
Best Actress	1943	Amelia Bence	Todo un hombre
Best Actress	1944	Mirtha Legrand	La pequeña señora de Pérez
Best Actress	1945	Delia Garcés	La dama duende
Best Actress	1947	Amelia Bence	A sangre fría
Best Actress	1948	Zully Moreno	Dios se lo pague
Best Actress	1949	Amelia Bence	Danza del fuego
Best Actress	1950	Tita Merello	Arrabalera
Best Actress	1951	Tita Merello	Los isleros
Best Actress	1952	Mirtha Legrand	La de los ojos color del tiempo
1953	Zully Moreno	La mujer de las camelias	
Best Actor	1941	Enrique Muiño	El cura gaucho
Best Actor	1942	Francisco Petrone	La guerra gaucha
Best Actor	1943	Francisco Petrone	Todo un hombre
Best Actor	1944	Enrique Muiño	Su mejor alumno
Best Actor	1947	Pedro López Lagar	Albéniz
Best Actor	1948	Arturo de Córdova	Dios se lo pague
Best Actor	1949	Narciso Ibáñez Menta	Almafuerte
Best Actor	1950	Luis Sandrini	La culpa la tuvo el otro
Best Actor	1951	Mario Soffici	El extraño caso del hombre y la bestia
Best Actor	1952	Francisco Martínez Allende	Facundo, el tigre de los llanos
Best Actor	1953	Enrique Muiño	Caballito criollo
Best supporting actress	1941	Amelia Bence	La casa de los cuervos
Best supporting actress	1942	Alita Román	Concierto de almas
Best supporting actress	1943	Leticia Scuri	Tres hombres del río
Best supporting actress	1947	Sabina Olmos	La gata
Best supporting actress	1948	Sabina Olmos	Tierra del Fuego
Best supporting actress	1949	Eva Caselli	Almafuerte
Best supporting actress	1950	Diana Maggi	Nacha Regules
Best supporting actor	1941	Sebastián Chiola	Historia de una noche
Best supporting actor	1942	Ernesto Vilches	Su primer baile
Best supporting actor	1943	Orestes Caviglia	Casa de muñecas
Best supporting actor	1947	Alberto Bello	Madame Bovary
Best supporting actor	1948	Enrique Chaico	Dios se lo pague
Best supporting actor	1949	Alberto Closas	Danza del fuego
Best supporting actor	1950	Ricardo Trigo	Captura recomendada
Outstanding female performance	1951	Malvina Pastorino	Sombras en la frontera
Outstanding female performance	1952	Golde Flami	Deshonra
Outstanding female performance	1953	Nelly Panizza	Mercado negro
Outstanding male performance	1951	Santiago Gómez Cou	La orquídea
Outstanding male performance	1952	Pedro Laxalt	Las aguas bajan turbias
Outstanding male performance	1953	Eduardo Cuitiño	La pasión desnuda
Best original musical score	1941	Jean Gilbert	Novios para las muchachas
Best original musical score	1942	Alberto Ginastera	Malambo
Best original musical score	1943	Julián Bautista	Cuando florezca el naranjo
Best original musical score	1944	Julián Bautista	Cuando la primavera se equivoca
Best original musical score	1947	Julián Bautista	Mirad los lirios del campo
Best original musical score	1948	Alejandro Gutiérrez del Barrio	Juan Moreira
Best original musical score	1949	Alberto Ginastera	Nace la libertad
Best original musical score	1950	Julián Bautista	La barca sin pescador
Best original musical score	1951	Juan Ehlert	La orquídea
Best original musical score	1952	Alberto Ginastera	Facundo, el tigre de los llanos
Best original musical score	1953	Tito Ribero	Del otro lado del puente
Best scenography	1941	Jorge Arancibia	Veinte años y una noche
Best scenography	1942	Ralph Pappier and Carlos Ferrarotti	En el viejo Buenos Aires
Best scenography	1943	Gori Muñoz	Juvenilia
Best scenography	1944	Ralph Pappier	Su mejor alumno
Best scenography	1947	Gori Muñoz	La copla de la Dolores
Best scenography	1948	Gori Muñoz	Historia de una mala mujer
Best scenography	1949	Álvaro Durañona y Vedia	Danza del fuego
Best scenography	1950	Abel López Chas	Escuela de campeones
Best scenography	1951	Gori Muñoz	Sangre negra
Best scenography	1952	Álvaro Durañona y Vedia	Deshonra
Best scenography	1953	Gori Muñoz	Un ángel sin pudor
Best cinematographer	1941	Alberto Etchebere	Historia de una noche
Best cinematographer	1942	José Suárez, Roque Funes and Antonio Merayo	Malambo
Best cinematographer	1943	Francis Boeniger	Tres hombres del río
Best cinematographer	1944	Bob Roberts	Su mejor alumno
Best cinematographer	1947	Pablo Tabernero	Siete para un secreto
Best cinematographer	1948	Antonio Merayo	Pasaporte a Río
Best cinematographer	1949	Humberto Peruzzi	Danza del fuego
Best cinematographer	1950	Alberto Etchebehere	Nacha Regules
Best cinematographer	1951	Antonio Merayo	Sangre negra
Best cinematographer	1952	Alberto Etchebehere	Deshonra
Best cinematographer	1953	Antonio Merayo	La mujer de las camelias
Best sound	1941	Ramón Ator	Los afincaos
Best sound	1942	Jorge Di Lauro and Alfredo Pablo Murúa	La guerra gaucha
Best sound	1943	Ramón Ator	Juvenilia
Best sound	1944	Ramón Ator	Su mejor alumno
Best editing	1941	Carlos Rinaldi	Yo quiero morir contigo
Best editing	1942	Carlos Rinaldi	La guerra gaucha
Best editing	1943	José Cañizares	Juvenilia
Best editing	1944	Carlos Rinaldi	Su mejor alumno
Best individual production	1947	Luis Saslavsky	A sangre fría
Best child interpretation	1947	Luis Zavalla	Corazón
Best child interpretation	1948	Andresito Poggio	Pelota de trapo
Best child interpretation	1949	Panchito Lombard	Almafuerte
Best child interpretation	1950	Julio Esbrez	Surcos de sangre
Best camera	1941	Humberto Peruzzi	El cura gaucho
Best camera	1942	Humberto Peruzzi	La guerra gaucha
Best camera	1943	Leo Fleider	Tres hombres del río
Best camera	1944	Humberto Peruzzi	El muerto falta a la cita
Best research	1942	Laboratorios Alex	For its work with color films
Best foreign film	1941	John Ford	Hombres del mar
Best short film	1941	Catrano Catrani	Catamarca, la tierra de la Virgen del Valle
Special mention	1941	Mirtha Legrand (actriz)	Los martes orquídeas
Special mention	1941	María Duval (actriz)	Canción de cuna
Special mention	1941	Nicolás Proserpio (montajista)	Tigre
Special mention	1941	Disney (productora) - Leopold Stokowsky (director)	Fantasía
Special mention	1943	Mariana Martí (actriz)	Dieciséis años
Special mention	1947	Pedro Miguel Obligado (guionista)	Albéniz
Special mention	1947	Sabina Olmos (actriz)	Albéniz
Special mention	1947	Raúl Soldi (escenógrafo)	Albéniz
Special mention	1947	Guillermo Cases (director musical)	Albéniz
Special mention	1947	Antonio Merayo (director de fotografía)	Albéniz
Special mention	1947	Mario Fezia (operador de cámara)	Albéniz
Special mention	1947	José María Paleo (sonidista)	Albéniz
Special mention	1947	Jorge Garate (montajista)	Albéniz
Special mention	1947	Roque Giacovino (director de fotografía)	Albéniz
Special mention	1948	Mario Soficci (director)	Tierra del Fuego
Special mention	1948	Curt G. Lowe (productor)	Tierra del Fuego
Special mention	1948	Armando Bo (actor)	Pelota de trapo
Special mention	1948	Leo Fleider and Francisco Madrid	Los pueblos dormidos
Special mention	1948	Arturo S. Mom (director)	Cómo se hace una película argentina
Special mention	1948	Tulio Demicheli (guionista)	Dios se lo pague
Special mention	1948	Alberto Etchebehere (director de fotografía)	Dios se lo pague
Special mention	1948	Juan Ehlert (músico)	Dios se lo pague
Special mention	1948	Mario Fezia (operador de cámara)	Dios se lo pague
Special mention	1948	Carlos Marín	Dios se lo pague
Special mention	1948	Jorge Garate (montajista)	Dios se lo pague
Special mention	1948	Roque Giacovino (director de fotografía)	Dios se lo pague
Special mention	1948	José Olarra (actor)	Por su trayectoria actoral
Special mention	1949	Luis Sandrini (actor)	Por su brillante actuación en el cine argentino
Special mention	1949	Manuel Romero (director y guionista)	Por su apreciable contribución al cine nacional
Special mention	1949	Arturo S. Mom (director)	For the first color documentary Mar del Plata
Special mention	1949	Alberto Etchebehere (director de fotografía)	Almafuerte
Special mention	1949	Alejandro Gutiérrez del Barrio (músico)	Almafuerte
Special mention	1949	Mario Fezia (operador de cámara)	Almafuerte
Special mention	1949	José María Paleo (sonidista)	Almafuerte
Special mention	1949	Jorge Garate (montajista)	Almafuerte
Special mention	1949	Alberto Curchi (operador de cámara)	Almafuerte
Special mention	1950	Zully Moreno (actriz)	Nacha Regules
Special mention	1950	Arturo de Córdova (actor)	Nacha Regules
Special mention	1950	Gori Muñoz (escenógrafo)	Nacha Regules
Special mention	1950	Juan Ehlert (músico)	Nacha Regules
Special mention	1950	Mario Fezia (operador de cámara)	Nacha Regules
Special mention	1950	Carlos Marín (sonidista)	Nacha Regules
Special mention	1950	Jorge Garate (montajista)	Nacha Regules
Special mention	1950	Alberto Curchi (operador de cámara)	Nacha Regules
Special mention	1951	Documentary film	Soñemos
Special mention	1951	Diana Myriam Jones	Soñemos
Special mention	1951	Federico Valle (productor)	Por su contribución al desarrollo inicial de la cinematografía argentina
Special mention	1952	Secretaría de Prensa y Difusión de la Presidencia de la Nación (productora)	Eva Perón inmortal
Special mention	1952	Daniel Tinayre (director)	Deshonra
Special mention	1952	Juan José Guthman (productor)	Deshonra
Special mention	1952	Sucesos Argentinos, Noticiario Panamericano and Semanario Argentino	Eva Perón inmortal
Special mention	1952	Adrianita (actriz)	La melodía perdida
Special mention	1953	Secretaría de Prensa y Difusión de la Presidencia de la Nación (productora)	Argentina de fiesta
Special mention	1953	Paramount Film (Major foreign film)	Antesala del infierno
Special mention	1953	Carlos Thompson (protagonista)	La mujer de las camelias
Special mention	1953	Wassen Eisen (adaptador)	La mujer de las camelias
Special mention	1953	José Serra (montajista)	La mujer de las camelias
Special mention	1953	Mario Fezia (operador de cámara)	La mujer de las camelias
Special mention	1953	Carlos Marín (sonidista)	La mujer de las camelias
Special mention	1953	Alberto Curchi (operador de cámara)	La mujer de las camelias

== Bibliography ==
- Di Núbila, Domingo (1998). La época de oro. Historia del cine argentino I (in Spanish). Buenos Aires: Ediciones del Jilguero. ISBN 978-987-957-865-0.
