= Rita Montero =

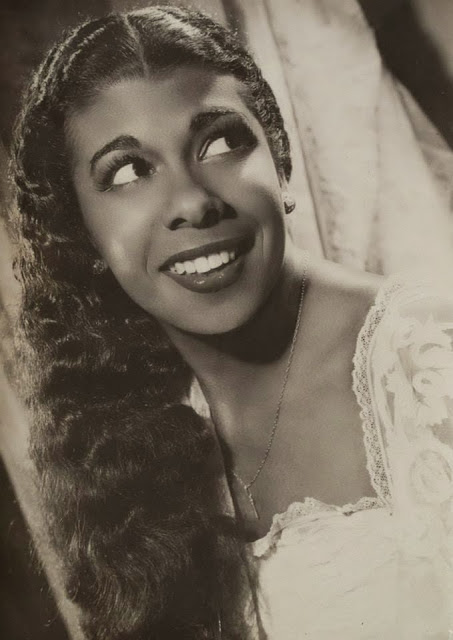
- Rita Lucía Montero by Annemarie Heinrich c1957

Background information
- Born: 4 May 1928; Buenos Aires, Argentina
- Died: 28 June 2013 (aged 85) Argentina
- Occupation: singer
- Years active: 1943–1955

Rita Lucía Montero (4 May 1928 – 28 June 2013) was an Argentine theatre, cinema and television actress and singer of the classical era of Argentine cinema.

== Biography ==
Montero was born into an Afro-Argentine family in the Palermo neighborhood of Buenos Aires in 1928. Her parents were Severo Miguel Montero and Zelmira Oturbé. Her paternal grandparents were Sergio Pantaleón Montero and Emilia Solari. Montero's family's oral history maintained that they were descended from enslaved Africans taken to Argentina by Guillermo Brown in the mid-19th century.

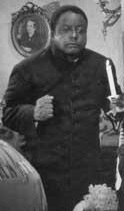
Montero's uncle, Vicente Álvarez, was also an actor

While still in primary school she worked with Argentina's first children's theatre company, Teatro Infantil de Angelina Pagan, appearing in the play La Venganza de Las Mariposas (The Revenge of the Butterflies). She made her film debut aged 15 when her uncle, film actor Vicente Álvarez, who was also a booking agent for black actors and performers in Buenos Aires theatres and film industry, got her a part as an extra in the 1943 film Juvenilia.

== Career ==
In 1946, when she starred in a major theatre role, the newspapers carried the headline "Una morena asoma en el teatro porteño", translated as "A black women peeks out in Buenos Aires theatre". This was particularly significant because the stars of "el teatro porteño" were almost exclusively white.

Montero starred in several films in what is considered to be Argentine cinema's golden age, starring alongside important stars like George Rigaud, Silvana Roth, Olga Zubarry, José Ruzzo, Guillermo Battaglia, Alberto Barcel, Enrique Chaico, Pablo Cumo, Enrique Muiño, Amalia Sánchez Ariño, and Margarita Tops.

Domestically, she performed in various locations, including: Buenos Aires, Chubut, Córdoba, Mendoza, Neuquén, San Juan, Santa Fe and Tucumán. She also performed international, travelling to Montevideo (1957 and 1976), Santiago of Chile (1957, 1959, and 1963), Lima (1964), Porto Alegre and São Paulo (both in 1973).

She studied singing with the Italian opera singer María Naftri. She interpreted tangos and jazz, performing in coffee houses, nightclubs and bars. She recorded three records, including an album for RCA Víctor in 1961 with the Carlos García Orchestra and Tangos de piel morena with Juan Pugliano in 2003. She was also the female vocalist for Barry Moral's orchestra and Tito Alberti's "Jazz Casino".

== Filmography ==
- 1943: Juvenilia
- 1945: Savage Pampas
- 1946: Musical Romance
- 1948: La Muerte Camina en la Lluvia
- 1948: María de los Ángeles
- 1949: ¿Por Qué Mintió la Cigüeña?
- 1950: Escuela de Campeones
- 1951: Sangre Negra
- 1954: El Grito Sagrado
- 1955: ¡Adiós Problemas!!

== Television ==
- Cajita Of Music, Channel 7
- 1960: The Show of Pinocho
- 1954: Hit of the One
- 1984: Saturdays of the Goodness
- The Show of the Grandparents, by Channel 13

== Theatre ==
- Black Blood (1945), with Narciso Ibáñez Mint in the National Theatre.
- My Wanted to Ruth (1946), directed by Antonio Cunill Cabanellas in the Theatre Empire.
- In an Old Playground Porteño (1950), with Sara Barrié, Olga Mom, Pablo Lagarde, Perla Grecco, Fernando Borel, among others.
- The Bikini Went in Orbit (1959)
- Go to the Follies (1959)
- To the Hour of the Tea, Food and Boíte (1959)
- Carnival of the Flowers (1959)
- Carnival Carioca (1962)
- Look that Crazy Head (1964)
- Nude 64 (1964)
- Tuesday of Tango (1977)
- Passion and Death of Silverio Leguizamón (1983), in the Municipal Theatre Saint General Martín.
- As a Rain of Magnolias (2010)

She also sang in the company of Katherine Dunham in the Theatre Casino.

== Homages ==
In 2010, she received a prize for her outstanding work and for her contribution to African-Argentinian Culture.
