= La Guerra Gaucha (novel) =

1905 book by Leopoldo Lugones

La Guerra Gaucha is the first book, outside of his published poems, of the Argentine writer Leopoldo Lugones (1874–1938). Published in 1905, it is a book of stories about the gaucho guerrilla war they fought, commanded by Martín Miguel de Güemes, against the Spanish royalists during the Argentine War of Independence, between 1815 and 1825. It is written in the fictional gaucho slang of the time and it is difficult to understand for anyone not versed in it. The strength of the epic nature of the stories made it a very successful book.

Based on this book, years later in 1941, it was adapted to the screen for the film La Guerra Gaucha, directed by Lucas Demare, with a screenplay by Ulyses Petit de Murat and Homero Manzi and with starring Enrique Muiño, Francisco Petrone, Ángel Magaña, Sebastián Chiola and Amelia Bence, among others.

== Characteristics ==
To write the book, Lugones travelled to Salta Province to see the actual places where the battles took place and to record the oral traditions of the locals. The book is therefore very descriptive, spending a lot of time in the descriptions of the nature and landscape of the area.

== Stories ==
Some of the stories from La Guerra Gaucha are:

- "Juramento": moved by his love for a patriot widow, a young royalist officer deserts to align himself with the rebels.
- "Carga": describes a combat action where the gaucho guerrillas raid the Spanish camp using horses in a wild run with their tails on fire.
- "Al rastro": one lone gaucho drives a horse cart full of gunpowder to make it explode against a royalist battalion, then fighting with the survivors until his death.
- "Dianas": A village priest, disguising himself as a royalist, rings the church bells to tell the patriots about the Spanish movements.
- "Alerta": A patriot weaver is raped by the Spaniards, and a messenger boy is murdered.
- "Sorpresa": About a gaucho militia captain who could read and write.
- "Un lazo": About a man that can "communicate" with horses and know their secrets.
- "Güemes": About Salta's caudillo Martín Miguel de Güemes, commanding general of the gaucho militia.

In Lugones' stories (though not the film), all the heroes are anonymous, trying to fortify the idea of a "people in arms".

== Author's rights ==
Leopoldo Lugones died in 1938, thus his work is public domain since January 1, 2009 (Article 5 of Argentine Law #11,723).
