= Savage Pampas =

Savage Pampas (Spanish: Pampa bárbara) may refer to:

- Savage Pampas (1945 film), an Argentine film directed by Lucas Demare and Hugo Fregonese
- Savage Pampas (1966 film), an English-language remake directed by Hugo Fregonese
