= Santos Vega (1936 film) =

1936 film

- Directed by: Luis Moglia Barth
- Written by: Eduardo Gutiérrez (novel); Hugo Mac Dougall
- Cinematography: Bob Roberts
- Edited by: Nicolás Proserpio
- Music by: Alejandro Gutiérrez del Barrio
- Release date: 17 September 1936
- Running time: 89 minutes
- Country: Argentina
- Language: Spanish

Santos Vega is a 1936 Argentine historical film directed by Luis Moglia Barth during the Golden Age of Argentine cinema. It is based on the story of Santos Vega.

== Cast ==
- Mario Baroffio
- Cayetano Biondo
- Enrique Chaico
- Max Citelli
- Miguel Coiro
- Pablo Cumo
- Floren Delbene
- Dora Ferreiro
- Carlos Fioriti
- José Franco
- Nedda Francy
- Ana Gryn
- Pascual Nacarati
- Fernando Ochoa
- Nathán Pinzón
- Alfonso Pisano
- Domingo Sapelli
- Juan Sarcione
- Marino Seré
- Jorge Villoldo
- Luis Zaballa
- Enrique Zingoni

== Bibliography ==
- Emilio Pedro Portorrico. Diccionario biográfico de la música argentina de raíz folklórica. 2004.
