= To Live for a Moment =

1951 film

- Directed by: Tulio Demicheli
- Written by: Tulio Demicheli; Ulises Petit de Murat
- Produced by: Eduardo Bedoya
- Starring: Tita Merello; Alberto Closas; Eduardo Cuitiño
- Cinematography: Francis Boeniger
- Edited by: Atilio Rinaldi; Raúl Rinaldi
- Music by: Catulo Castillo; Sebastián Piana; Tito Ribero
- Production company: Artistas Argentinos Asociados
- Distributed by: Artistas Argentinos Asociados
- Release date: 3 January 1951
- Running time: 98 minutes
- Country: Argentina
- Language: Spanish

To Live for a Moment (Spanish: Vivir un instante) is a 1951 Argentine drama film of the classical era of Argentine cinema, directed by Tulio Demicheli and starring Tita Merello, Alberto Closas and Eduardo Cuitiño. The film's sets were designed by the art directors Germán Gelpi and Mario Vanarelli.

== Cast ==
- Tita Merello as Julia Lombardo
- Alberto Closas as Pepe
- Eduardo Cuitiño as Dominico
- Diana Toldy as Walaska
- José Maurer as Walaska
- Jorge Closas as Secuaz de Dominico
- Nelly Meden as Mujer en cabaret
- Rafael Diserio as Comprador
- Margarita Linton as Gaby
- Domingo Mania as Juan
- Zita Szeleczky as Vilma

== Bibliography ==
- Cabrera, Gustavo. Tita Merello (1904-2002): el mito, la mujer y el cine. BPR Publishers, 2006.
- King, John & Torrents, Nissa. The Garden of Forking Paths: Argentine Cinema. British Film Institute, 1988.
