= Leopoldo Lugones =

Argentine poet

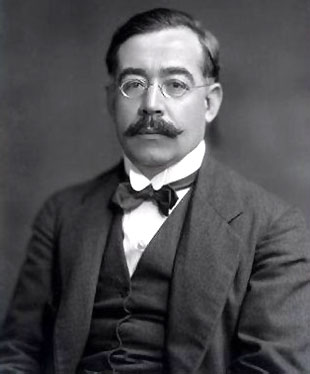
- Born: 13 June 1874 Villa de María del Río Seco, Argentina
- Died: 18 February 1938 (aged 63) Tigre, Argentina
- Occupation: Journalist, writer
- Genre: Fantasy, Christian apologetics, Catholic apologetics, Mystery
- Literary movement: Modernism

Signature
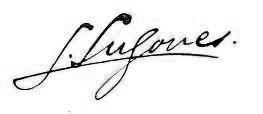

Leopoldo Antonio Lugones Argüello (13 June 1874 – 18 February 1938) was an Argentine poet, essayist, novelist, playwright, historian, professor, translator, biographer, philologist, theologian, diplomat, politician and journalist. His poetic writings are often considered to be the founding works of Spanish-language modern poetry (not, however, according to some sources, modernismo, although other sources claim that he was the father of modernismo). His short stories made him a crucial precursor and also a pioneer of both the fantastic and science fiction literature in Argentina.

== Early life ==
Born in Villa de María del Río Seco, a city in Córdoba Province, in Argentina's Catholic heartland, Lugones belonged to a family of landed gentry. He was the firstborn son of Santiago M. Lugones and Custodia Argüello. His father, son of Pedro Nolasco Lugones, was returning from the city of Buenos Aires to Santiago del Estero when he met Custodia Argüello while stopping in Villa de María, a locality that was at that time disputed territory between the provinces of Santiago del Estero and Córdoba. It was his mother who gave young Leopoldo his first lessons and was responsible for his strict Catholic upbringing.

When Lugones was six years old and following the birth of a second child, the family moved to the city of Santiago del Estero and later to Ojo de Agua, a small town situated in the south of the province of Santiago del Estero close to the border with Córdoba, where the poet's two younger brothers were born: Ramón Miguel Lugones (1880, Santiago del Estero), and the youngest of the four children, Carlos Florencio Lugones (1885, Ojo de Agua). Later his parents sent him to study at the Colegio Nacional de Monserrat, in Córdoba, where his maternal grandmother lived. In 1892 the family would move to that city, at the time when Lugones was beginning his forays into the fields of journalism and literature.

He first worked for La Montaña, a newspaper, and was in favour with the aristocratic Manuel Quintana, a candidate to become a president of Argentina. This brought him first to Buenos Aires in 1896, where his literary talent developed quickly.

That year, he married Juana Agudelo, from whom he had a son, Leopoldo Polo Lugones, who would become the notorious chief of the Federal Police during the dictatorship of José Félix Uriburu. In 1899, he became an active Freemason.

== Career ==
Lugones was the leading Argentine exponent of the Latin American literary current known as Modernismo. This was a form of Parnassianism influenced by Symbolism. He was also the author of the incredibly dense and rich stories of La Guerra Gaucha (1905). He was an impassioned journalist, polemicist and public speaker who at first was a Socialist, later a conservative/traditionalist and finally a supporter of Fascism and as such an inspiration for a group of rightist intellectuals such as Juan Carulla and Rodolfo Irazusta.

Leopoldo Lugones went to Europe in 1906, 1911, 1913 and in 1930, in which latter year he supported the coup d'état against the aging Radical party president, Hipólito Yrigoyen. Between 1924 and 1931, Lugones took part in the works of the International Committee on Intellectual Cooperation of the League of Nations.

On February 18, 1938, the despairing and disillusioned Lugones committed suicide by taking a mixture of whisky and cyanide while staying at the river resort of El Tigre in Buenos Aires. Political frustration has been the most widely cited cause of his suicide. Nevertheless, recent publications in Argentina have shed light on another possible motivation: Lugones was very enamored of a girl he met at one of his lectures in the university. He maintained a passionate and emotional relationship with her until, discovered and pressured by his son, he was forced to leave her, causing in him a depressive decline that would end his life.

His descendants have had similarly tragic fates. It is believed that his son Polo, the chief of police during Uriburu's dictatorship, was the creator of the picana and the one who introduced it as a method of torture. Polo Lugones committed suicide in 1971. Polo's younger daughter, Susana "Pirí" Lugones, was detained and disappeared in December 1977 as a victim of the Dirty War. His older daughter, Carmen, whom he called Babú, is still alive. One of Pirí's sons, Alejandro, committed suicide, like his great-grandfather, in Tigre. This comprises Lugones' tragic familial fate, similar to that of Horacio Quiroga's, himself a friend and admirer of Leopoldo Lugones.

== Selected bibliography ==
=== Novella ===
- El ángel de la sombra (1926)

=== Short story collections ===
- La guerra gaucha (1905)
- Las fuerzas extrañas (1906). Strange Forces, trans. Gilbert Alter-Gilbert (Latin American Literary Review Press, 2001).
- Cuentos fatales (1924)

=== Poetry ===
- Las montañas del oro (The Mountains of Gold) (1897)
- Los crepúsculos del jardín (The Twilight of the Garden) (1905)
- Lunario sentimental (Lunario sentimental) (1909)
- Odas seculares (Secular Odes) (1910)
- El libro fiel (The Faithful Book) (1912)
- El libro de los paisajes (The Book of Landscapes) (1917)
- Las horas doradas (The Golden Hours) (1922)
- Romances del Río Seco (Romances of the Seco River) (posthumously, 1939)

=== Essays ===
- 1903: La reforma educacional. Un ministro y doce académicos
- 1904: El imperio jesuítico
- 1910: Didáctica
- 1910: Las limaduras de Hephaestos. Piedras liminares
- 1910: Las limaduras de Hephaestos. Prometeo (un proscripto del sol)
- 1915: El ejército de la Ilíada
- 1916: El problema feminista
- 1917: Mi beligerancia
- 1919: Las industrias de Atenas
- 1919: La torre de Casandra
- 1923: Acción. Las cuatro conferencias patrióticas del Coliseo
- 1924: Estudios helénicos
- 1925: La organización de la paz
- 1928: Nuevos estudios helénicos
- 1930: La grande Argentina
- 1930: La patria fuerte
- 1931: Política revolucionaria
- 1932: El estado equitativo. Ensayo sobre la realidad argentina

== In popular culture ==
La guerra gaucha (The Gaucha War) is a 1942 Argentine historical drama and epic film directed by Lucas Demare and starring Enrique Muiño, Francisco Petrone, Ángel Magaña, and Amelia Bence. The film's script, written by Homero Manzi and Ulyses Petit de Murat, is based on the short story collection by Leopoldo Lugones published in 1905. The film premiered in Buenos Aires on November 20, 1942, and is considered by critics of Argentine cinema as one of the most successful films in the history of the cinema.

Jorge Luis Borges dedicated one of his books, Dreamtigers, to Lugones.

== See also ==
- List of Argentines
