= Elías Isaac Alippi =

Argentine actor (1883–1942)

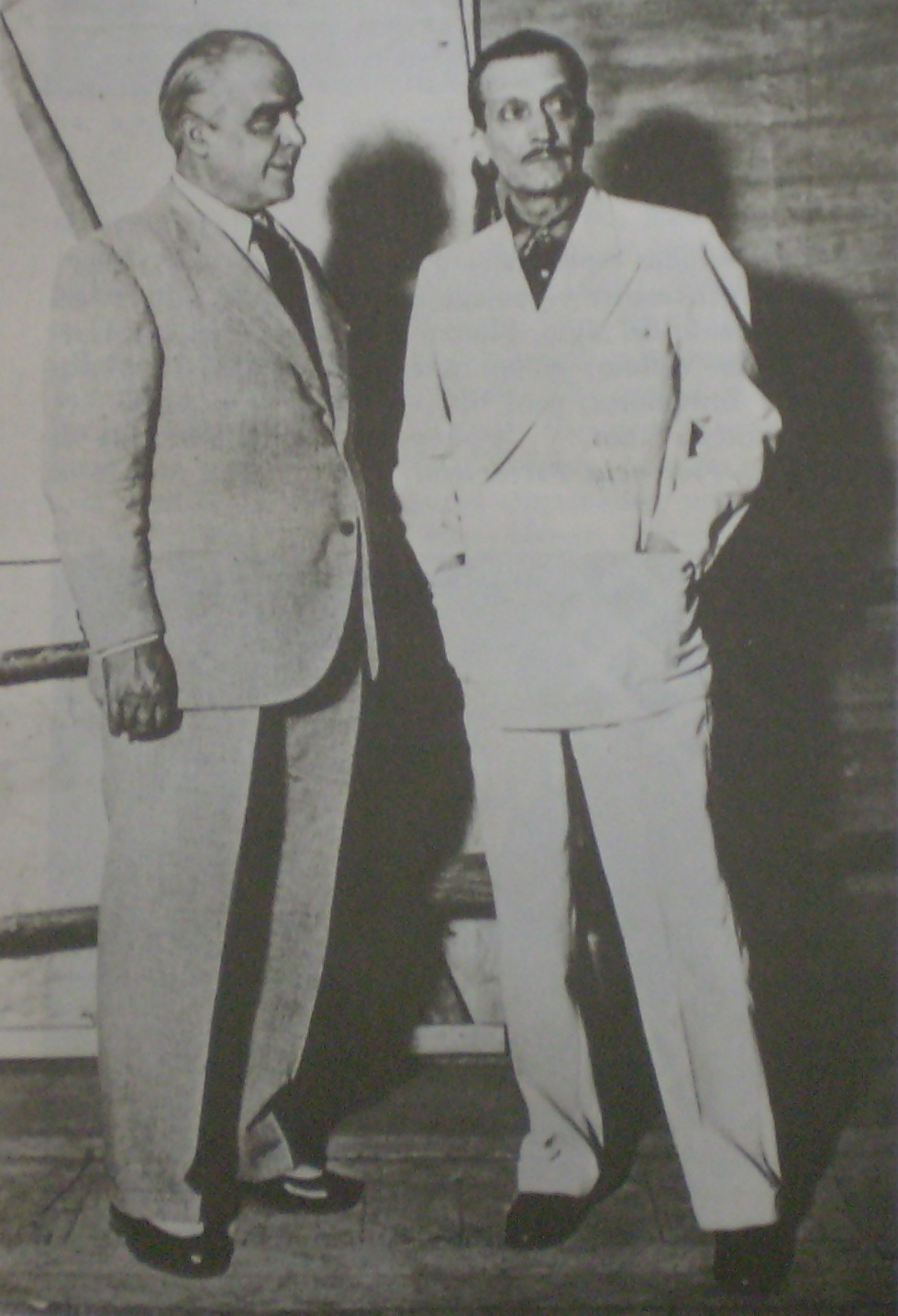
- Argentine actors Enrique Muiño (left) and Elías Alippi
- Born: January 21, 1883; Buenos Aires, Argentina
- Died: May 3, 1942 (aged 59); Buenos Aires

Elías Isaac Alippi (January 21, 1883 – May 3, 1942) was an Argentine actor from the Golden Age, theatrical impresario, film director and theater director, who was born and died in Buenos Aires. He is also remembered as an excellent tango dancer.

== His work with the theater ==
Alippi started in the theater in 1903 at the "Comedia de Buenos Aires" theater with Jerónimo Podestá's company. He formed his own acting company which was joined by Francisco Ducasse, José González Castillo, Miguel Ligero, Héctor Quiroga, Carlos Morganti among others known actors of the era.

He traveled with Carlos Gardel to Brazil in 1915, failed and returned with no money. He then formed the "Compañía Tradicionista Argentina" (Argentine Traditionalist Company) which, with the direction of José González Castillo played at the San Martín theater in 1915, Juan Moreira, Santos Vega and Martín Fierro with the musical help of Gardel and Razzano and their songs, plus Alippi's who wrote several tangos.

In 1916 he was joined by Enrique Muiño and formed the Muiño-Alippi Company, which would become one of the most important popular theater production companies of the time. Among the plays and musicals presented were La taba del querer by Carlos Schaeffer Gallo at the Nuevo theater in 1916, Las entrañas del lobo by Carlos De Paoli, Los novios de Genoveva by Alberto Vacarezza, El candidato del pueblo by José Antonio Saldías in 1917 and Avanti Foot-ball club by Juan Fernando Camilo Darthés and Carlos Santiago Daniel in 1918.

In 1918 Elías Alippi, who worked in the production the sainete Los dientes del perro (The Dog's teeth) by José González Castillo an Alberto T. Weisbach had the idea of presenting a scene in a cabaret live with the best orchestra of the time, he hired Roberto Firpo's orchestra, to play tangos as proposed by his friend Gardel. They included the tango piece Mi noche triste (My sad night) by Samuel Castriota and Pascual Contursi to be sung by Manolita Poli, a 19-year-old actress and singer, daughter of zarzuela parents. The play opened on 20 April 1918 at the Esmeralda theater (later called Maipo), and stayed open the whole season and renewed for a subsequent season the next year. The principal factor of such a success was the incorporation of the tango piece to the theatrical play, and especially the public's applause to the playing of Mi noche triste.

The company also played Premios a la virtud (Prizes for virtue) by Ulises Favaro in July 1920, El testamento de Fausto (Faust's testament) by Miguel Escuder on 23 December 1921, Pepita de oro (Gold nugget) by Roberto Cayol on 15 May 1924. Also played El debut de la piba (The girl's debut) by Roberto Cayol in 1916, Los bailes de la famosa (The dances of the famous woman) by Roberto Cayol in 1917, Chacarita by Alberto Vacarezza in 1924, La familia de don Giacumín (Don Giacumin's family) by Alberto Novión in 1924, among others.

He produced many more theater plays, including El Indio Rubio (The blond Indian); El Dolor Ajeno (Somebody else's pain), with José de Lara; ¡Viva la República! (Long live the Republic!), with Maroni and Sanromá; Hay que hacer algo por la revista (Must do something with the review) with Maroni and Alberti; Mi mujer quiere casarse (My woman wants to marry), El conventillo de las catorce provincias (The fourteen provinces tenement), El cantar de los tangos (The singing of the tangos), La borrachera del tango (Tango's drunkenness), Tarantini y Cía (Tarantini and Company), with Antonio Botta; Con esta...sí (With this one...yes), Atención al fogonazo (Beware of the spark), Hasta el San Martín no para (He doesn't stop till the San Martín) referring to the San Martín Theater, with Pascual Contursi, Telones y Bambalinas (Stage and curtains) and Del tango al Charleston (From tango to Charleston).

== His work in the cinema ==
He debuted on the silent movies acting in Tierra baja (Low ground) (1912) and Mariano Moreno y la Revolución de Mayo (Mariano Moreno and the May Revolution) (1915). Then in the sound movie era eh acted in several films, among others: Cadetes de San Martín (San Martín's cadets) (1936), Viento Norte (North wind) and Así es la Vida (Such is life). Also in El mejor papá del mundo (The best dad in the world); Medio millón por una mujer (Half a million for a woman), with Eva Franco and Callejón sin salida (Dead-end alley), with Maruja Gil Quesada. Lastly, after his death a few scenes he had filmed were inserted in Se llamaba Carlos Gardel (He was named was Carlos Gardel) (1949).

In 1941 a group of performers usually met at the El Ateneo coffee house ubicado in the corner of Carlos Pellegrini and Cangallo (today's Teniente General Juan D. Perón) streets in Buenos Aires, including Enrique Muiño, Elías Alippi, Francisco Petrone and Ángel Magaña and also director Lucas Demare.

Enrique Faustín Jr., who worked in a movie production company, and also assisted to the meetings brought the idea of forming a production company as a Coop similar to United Artists in the United States. The company was founded on 26 September 1941 with the name of Artistas Argentinos Asociados (associated Argentine Artists).

The planned to film La Guerra Gaucha where Elías Alippi would act in the role of captain Del Carril, but as he fell ill to cancer and was not in shape to survive the rigorous filming conditions, his friends and colleagues, not wanting to replace him during his life, postponed the start of the project with an excuse and only started after his death, on 3 May 1942. The city of Buenos Aires named a city squared after him "Elías Alippi square" at the corner of Estado de Israel Ave. and Lambaré and Guardia Vieja streets.

== Filmography ==
As an actor

- Se llamaba Carlos Gardel (1949)
- El mejor papá del mundo (1941)
- Medio millón por una mujer (1940)
- Así es la vida (1939)
- Callejón sin salida (1938/I)
- Viento norte (1937)
- Cadetes de San Martín (1937)
- Mariano Moreno y la Revolución de Mayo (1915)
- Tierra baja (1912)

As director

- Retazo (1939)
- Callejón sin salida (1938)

== Theater plays ==
- Conferencia contra la mujer
- No se jubile, Don Pancho! in colaboraction with Antonio Botta.
- El cantar de los tangos in colaboraction with Botta.
- Es zonzo el cristiano macho cuando el amor lo domina in colaboraction with Carlos Schaeffer Toro
- Sos bueno, vos también! in colaboraction with Folco Testena.
- Fresco el Andarín in colaboraction with Augusto Garrido.
