= 1946 Argentine Film Critics Association Awards =

Argentine film awards ceremony in 1946

The 1946 Argentine Film Critics Association Awards ceremony was held in Buenos Aires to honour the best films and contributors to Argentine cinema in 1945.

== Awards given ==
- Best Film (Mejor Película): La dama duende
- Best Director (Mejor Director): Luis Saslavsky for La dama duende
- Best Actor (Mejor Actor): Narciso Ibáñez Menta for Cuando en el cielo pasen lista
- Best Actress (Mejor Actriz): Mecha Ortiz for El canto del cisne
- Best Supporting Actor (Mejor Actor de Reparto): Froilán Varela for Pampa bárbara
- Best Supporting Actress (Mejor Actriz de Reparto): Judith Sulian for Se abre el abismo
- Best New Actor (Revelación masculina): Francisco de Paula for Despertar a la vida
- Best New Actress (Revelación femenina): Delfy de Ortega for Santa Cándida
- Best Original Screenplay (Mejor Guión Original): Tulio Demicheli for Cuando en el cielo pasen lista
- Best Adapted Screenplay (Mejor Guión Adaptado): María Teresa León and Rafael Alberti for La dama duende
- Best Cinematography (Mejor Fotografía): Bob Roberts, Humberto Peruzzi and José María Beltrán for Pampa bárbara
- Best Music (Mejor Music): Julián Bautista for La dama duende
- Best Foreign Film (Mejor Película Extranjera): Charles Vidor's A Song to Remember (1945)
