= The Gaucho War =

1942 Argentine historical drama film

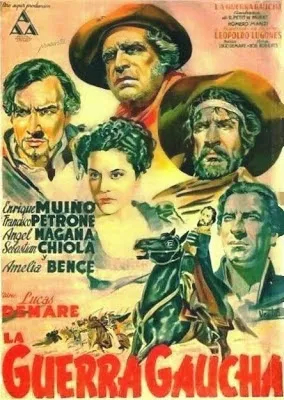
- Theatrical poster
- Directed by: Lucas Demare
- Written by: Ulyses Petit de Murat; Homero Manzi; Novel; Leopoldo Lugones
- Starring: Enrique Muiño; Francisco Petrone; Ángel Magaña; Sebastián Chiola; Amelia Bence; René Mugica
- Cinematography: Bob Roberts
- Music by: Lucio Demare; Jorge Di Lauro
- Distributed by: Artistas Argentinos Asociados; Estudios San Miguel
- Release date: November 20, 1942
- Running time: 95 minutes
- Country: Argentina
- Language: Spanish

The Gaucho War (La guerra gaucha) is a 1942 Argentine historical drama and epic film directed by Lucas Demare and starring Enrique Muiño, Francisco Petrone, Ángel Magaña, and Amelia Bence. It is one of the most celebrated works of the Golden Age of Argentine cinema. The film's script, written by Homero Manzi and Ulyses Petit de Murat, is based on the novel by Leopoldo Lugones published in 1905. The film premiered in Buenos Aires on November 20, 1942, and is considered by critics of Argentine cinema to be one of the most successful films in history.

It won three Silver Condor awards, including Best Film, Best Director (Lucas Demare), and Best Adapted Screenplay (Ulises Petit de Murat and Homero Manzi), given by the Argentine Film Critics Association at the 1943 Argentine Film Critics Association Awards for the best films and performances of the previous year.

The film is set in 1817 in the Salta Province of northwest Argentina during the Argentine War of Independence. It is based on the actions taken by the guerrillas under the command of the general Martin Güemes against the royalist army, loyal to the Spanish monarchy. For exterior filming, a village was established in the same area where the actual conflict had taken place. The cast of some thousand participants was unprecedented in Argentine cinema until that time.

The origins and content of the film are linked to a particular moment in Argentine history in which there was an intense debate over whether the country should take the side of either the Axis or the Allies during World War II, or maintain its neutrality during the war. The film stresses the values associated with nationalism as expressed in the union of the people, the army, and the church in defense of the country, which was considered by some a prelude to the revolutionary ideology that led to, on June 4, 1943, the overthrowing of the government of president Ramón Castillo.

The film was produced by Artistas Argentinos Asociados (Associated Argentine Artists), a cooperative of artists created just a short time before production began. It required an investment far beyond other productions of the period but the commercial success of the film allowed it to recover the cost in the first-run theaters, where it remained for nineteen weeks.

It was selected as the third greatest Argentine film of all time in the polls conducted by the Museo del Cine Pablo Ducrós Hicken in 1977 and 1984, while it ranked 7th in the 2000 edition. In a new version of the survey organized in 2022 by the specialized magazines La vida util, Taipei and La tierra quema, presented at the Mar del Plata International Film Festival, the film reached the 49 position.

== Plot ==
=== Prologue ===
The film begins with a prologue on screen providing the historical circumstances of the place and time in which the action is placed, and advancing the position of its authors. From 1814 to 1818, General Martín Miguel de Güemes and his gauchos resisted the Spanish royalist armies that systematically ransacked the country, attacking Argentina's Northwest from the Spanish base in Upper Peru since the withdrawal of the country's regular troops. This conflict consisted in Guerrilla warfare movements designed by Güemes and constant small battles characterized by the heroism of the irregular patriot forces commanded by Güemes.

The opening states:

"The thickness of the bushes gave cover to hundreds of partisans. The war of resources opened up like a mortal fan over the fields. Dented sables, clubs lances and bolas were the weapons of the gauchos. Neither hunger nor misery stopped these primitive hordes. To them, to the ones that died far from the pages of history we'd like to remember in these images"

=== Summary ===
1817: in Argentina's Salta Province, during the War of Independence, the irregular gaucho forces commanded by General Martín Miguel de Güemes carry out a series of guerrilla actions against the Spanish Royalist Army. The commander of a Spanish army contingent, Lieutenant Villarreal, is wounded, captured by the guerrillas, and put under the medical care of Asunción, the mistress of an estancia. Asunción finds out from Villarreal's identification papers that the Lieutenant, though serving in the Spanish army, was born in Lima (Peru). She persuades him in understanding the importance and true justice of liberating America from Spain's colonial rule.

The patriot forces receive help from the Sacristan of a chapel located next to the grounds of the royalist troops. The sacristan fakes loyalty to the Spanish king, but in the midst of the battles he sends messages to the gaucho guerrillas hiding in the mountains by means of a messenger boy and by the ringing of a bell. When the royalists discover this, they attack and burn the chapel and smash the sacristan's eyes. Blinded, the sacristan unwittingly guides the royalists to the patriot camp. The royalists then proceed to annihilate the gauchos.

After the battle, the only four survivors are the dying sacristan, an old man, a young boy, and Lieutenant Villarreal, who has fallen in love with Asunción and converted to the patriot cause. Though the group seems doomed, they suddenly see Güemes' arriving troops, which will continue the battle against the invader troops.

== Cast ==
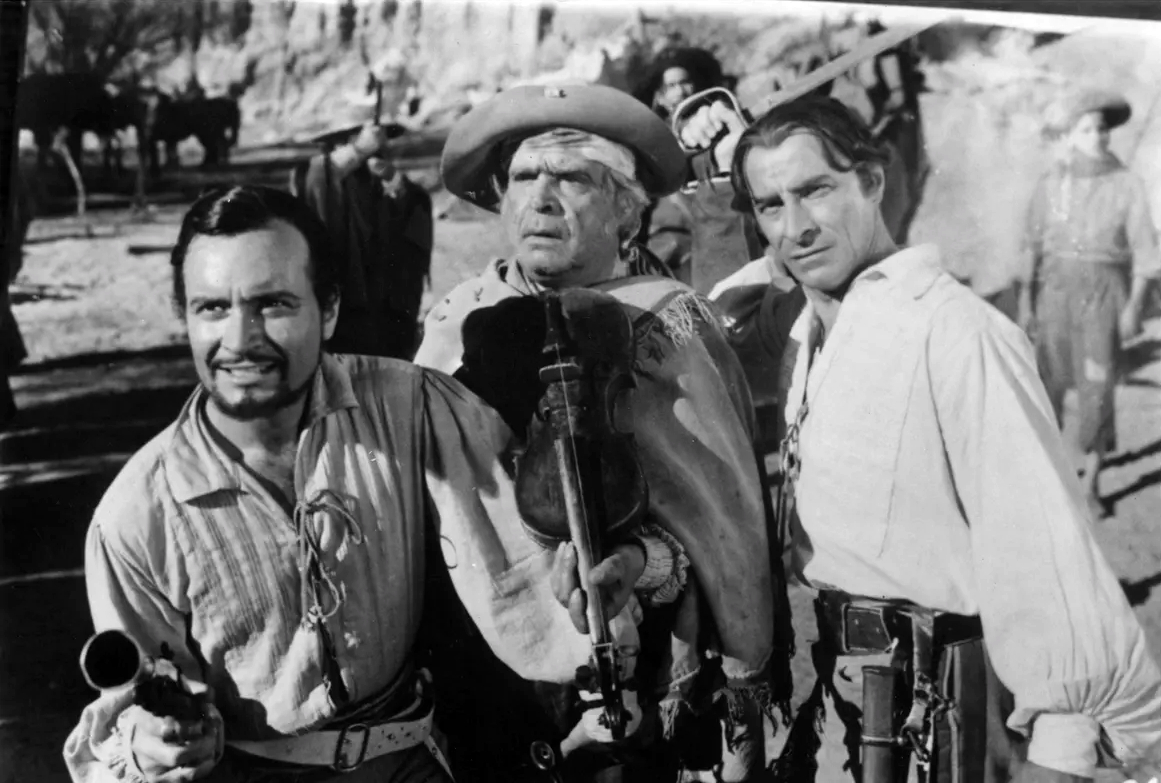
Ángel Magaña, Enrique Muiño and Sebastián Chiola

- Enrique Muiño as Sacristán Lucero
- Francisco Petrone (Francisco Antonio Petrecca Mesulla) as Capitán Miranda
- Ángel Magaña as Teniente Villarreal
- Sebastián Chiola as Capitán Del Carril
- Amelia Bence as Asunción Colombres
- Ricardo Galache
- Dora Ferreiro
- Elvira Quiroga
- Juan Pérez Bilbao
- Carlos Campagnale
- Aquiles Guerrero
- Roberto Combi
- Amílcar Leveratto
- Antonio Cytro
- Carlos Enzo
- Roberto Prause
- René Mugica
- Raúl Merlo
- Ricardo Reinaldo
- Alberto Contreras (son)
- Antonia Rojas
- Laura Moreno
- José López
- Jacinta Diana

== Production ==
=== The novel ===
Leopoldo Lugones (June 13, 1874 – February 18, 1938) was a prolific Argentine writer and journalist of whom Ricardo Rojas said:

"His verbal inventiveness was tremendous and he went through all the literary schools; as his mind was impressionable and he went through all the political parties. The variety of his themes, genres, and styles, in verse and in prose, is the most evident characteristic of his "complete works", if looked at as a whole, even though if they are studied separately his erudition can be appreciated, the fantasy, the verbal richness."

To write La guerra gaucha Lugones traveled to Salta Province, to visit the actual places where the events happened and to record the oral tradition of the area. It is an epic story composed of several histories described with a wide vocabulary full of metaphors. Dialogs are short, but descriptions and subjective vision are plentiful. The landscape characteristics and Salta's nature are described in detail and have great importance in the book.

=== Historical context in Argentina ===
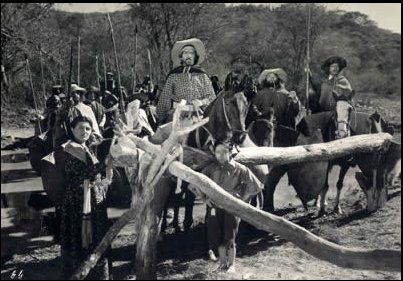
Francisco Petrone in a scene from the film

On February 20, 1938 Roberto M. Ortiz became president of Argentina. A member of the Unión Cívica Radical Antipersonalista party, he expressed his intention of ending the systemic electoral fraud imposed since the 1930 military coup. This idea found resistance within the political coalition named "The Concordance" ("La Concordancia") to which he belonged. Finally the worsening of his diabetes forced him to relinquish the presidency to his vice president Ramón Castillo, first in provisionally and after June 27, 1942, permanently. The new president was not in agreement with Ortiz's policies and from his post he condoned the fraud practices, disappointing the followers who believed in the changes proposed by his predecessor.

At the start of World War II the Argentine government declared itself neutral (on September 4, 1939), repeating the position taken during the First World War (1914–1918). Great Britain supported the decision as it was interested in Argentina being neutral and continuing the supply of food during the war.

In December 1941, the United States of America declared war on the Axis powers after the attack on Pearl Harbor. In January 1942, the Third Consulting Meeting of Chancellors of the American Republics met in Rio de Janeiro as the U.S. wished other American nations to break relations with the Axis powers. Argentina, which had had frictions with the U.S. in previous years, was opposed to said goals and influenced successfully to "recommend" the breakup of relations instead of making it mandatory.

The problems associated with foreign policy took on more importance in Argentina and revived the conflict between the three political factions, the one pushing for siding with the Allies, the neutrals, and the one more in tune with the Axis. This latter minority group included the followers of nationalism and some officers of the army. The subject of the position the country should take on the war displaced other issues in the national political arena.

Starting in the 1930s, and following a general tendency in Latin America, nationalist ideas were fortified in the countryside and many diverse sectors of Argentina. Political parties such as the Unión Cívica Radical, the Socialist Party of Argentina, and in the unions organized under the umbrella of the Confederación General del Trabajo the favorable currents for the State to become interventionist were growing, in order to push the preservation on the national interests and promote industrialization.

This ideological change was also observable in the cultural movements, with the vindication of the tango and the indigenous "gaucho roots". La guerra gaucha was then selected as the subject, written and filmed in the context of expansive nationalism and debates over issues of war.

=== State of the film industry in Argentina ===
In 1938, 41 films opened and 16 new directors debuted. In 1939, the number increased to 51 films. Argentine cinema was very popular. In Mexico, almost all Argentine films were shown. In 1940, 49 films opened, despite the shortage of celluloid due to the war. In 1941, there were 47 openings and in 1942, 57.

Francisco Petrone

=== Artistas Argentinos Asociados ===
A group of unemployed artists, Enrique Muiño, Elías Alippi, Francisco Petrone, Ángel Magaña, the director Lucas Demare and the chief of production of a movie company Enrique Faustín (son) met regularly at the beginning of the 1940s at the "El Ateneo" cafe in Buenos Aires.

The Ateneo Group ("Barra del Ateneo") decided to found a cooperative film production company following the style of the American United Artists, so on September 26, 1941, they started "Artistas Argentinos Asociados Sociedad Cinematográfica SRL".

=== Origins of the film ===
Artistas Argentinos Asociados had the idea of making this movie since the company had been established. Homero Manzi had the idea since he wrote the script to the film "Viento Norte" ("North Wind") and convinced director Lucas Demare of the project's viability. Francisco Petrone proposed that the script be written by Manzi and Ulyses Petit de Murat. The rights for the movie were purchased from Leopoldo "Polo" Lugones (son of the writer) for 10,000 pesos received two jazz records that were unavailable in the country.

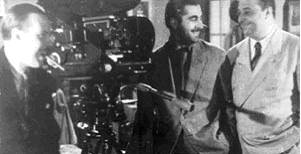
Ulyses Petit de Murat, Lucas Demare y Homero Manzi

Meanwhile, Elías Alippi, who would star in the role of captain Del Carril, fell ill with cancer (he would die on May 3, 1942). The company, knowing he was not in physical condition to survive the tough filming schedule and not wishing to replace him for another actor while he was alive, postponed the filming with an excuse and started to film El viejo Hucha ("Old Man Hucha"), in which he had no role.

Remembering the proposal to write the screenplay, Ulyses Petit de Murat said:

"I still think there was nothing movie-like in that book. Lugones was a formidable poet, but he was not conducive to the narrative. Manzi, with the strategic efforts of Petrone acted as if every issue was already resolved, by having myself fixed three short stories by Quiroga for "Prisioneros" ("Prisoners"). But, how to appease the great Lugones, against whom we battled some time ago, for his emphasis in the poetic orthodoxy of the rhyme, in the meter with which he always impressed us, beginning with the reading of his memorable "Montañas de oro" ("Gold Mountains")?

Due to having had spent all the budget needed for La guerra gaucha on El viejo Hucha, the partners at Artistas Argentinos Asociados decided to fund the film with their own fees. This financial effort was insufficient and they had to partner with San Miguel Studios and undersell the exhibition rights for the movie earlier in some areas. These decisions allowed them to make the film with "a little less belt-tightening but without splurging".

=== Script ===
==== Homero Manzi ====
Homero Manzi

Homero Manzi was born November first of 1907 in Añatuya (province of Santiago del Estero), Argentina. He was interested in literature and tango since he was young. After a brief incursion in journalism, Manzi worked as a literature and castilian professor but for political reasons (in addition to his membership in the Unión Cívica Radical) he was expelled of his professorship and decided to dedicate himself to the arts.

In 1935 he participated on the beginnings of FORJA (Fuerza de Orientación Radical de la Joven Argentina – Force of Radical Orientation of the Young Argentina), a group whose position has been classified as “peoples nationalism”. It was centered in the problematic Argentina and Latin America and on its discussions suggested “reconquer the political Sunday from our own land” since it considered the country was still under a colonial situation. It supported neutrality in WWII on the premise that was no great interest was in play in Argentina or Latin America, it was more of a rejection position towards fascism just as much as communism.

In 1934, Manzi founded Micrófono ("Microphone") magazine which covered subjects related to radiotelephony, Argentine movies and film making. He wrote the screenplay for Nobleza Gaucha in 1937 in collaboration with Hugo Mac Dougall, and a remake of Huella ("Footprint") (1940), for which they received second prize from Buenos Aires City Hall and also Confesión ("Confession") (1940), without achieving commercial success with any of these movies.

In 1940 Manzi started what would be a long collaboration with Ulyses Petit de Murat, writing the screenplay for Con el dedo en el gatillo ("Finger on the trigger") (1940) and later Fortín alto ("High Fort") (1940).

==== Ulyses Petit de Murat ====
Ulyses Petit de Murat was born in Buenos Aires on January 28, 1907, and was interested in literature and journalism from a young age. He was in charge of the music page in the daily magazine Crítica and, with Jorge Luis Borges, co-directed its literary supplement.

Ulyses Petit de Murat.

In 1932 he moved to the motion film section of Crítica and in 1939 wrote his first cinematographic script for the movie Prisioneros de la Tierra, an adaptation of four tales of Horacio Quiroga, made with his son, Dario Quiroga, who later in 1940 wrote Con el Dedo en el Gatillo, with the collaboration of Homero Manzi.

The screenwriters started by selecting the stories that would provide them with the elements for the work. Dianas was chosen as the main source, some characters were taken from Alertas and some from other stories. They compiled the words, traditions, life styles and idioms from that era for which they used books and even a trip was made to Salta to talk with the locals. A script Then a text was made from the tales and a first draft of the images. At this point the director and actors collaborated with their comments and finally the final script was written.

=== Direction ===
Born July 14, 1907, Demare was a music scholar. In 1928, he traveled to Spain as a bandoneón player for the Orchestra Típica Argentina, where his brother Lucio also played. In 1933 he worked as an interpreter and singer for Spanish movies Boliche and Aves sin rumbo.

Lucas Demare

Demare quit the orchestra and started working in the film industry; he quickly rose from chalkboard holder to director assistant. Some time later he was hired to debut as a director, but the civil war broke out and he returned to Buenos Aires.

Emilio Zolezzi, aside from being a movie critic, was also the Artistas Argentinas Associados attorney. He tells about the director:

"The civil war -and its set backs- put an end to the work Demare had in the Spanish theater. But he learned his job. Demare boasts about learning all the jobs on the film making world, that he started learning in Orphea Films, of Barcelona. From sweaping the floor to chalkboard holder, the way he progressed, all the way to director, the entire journey was traveled step by step... He is self-taught. That implied he had to start his theater career with a wall in front of him: the unknown. Which he overcame it through long and hard phases. Readings and learning techniques “stolen” on the set, with no guide other than his eagerness."

When he returned to Spain, his brother Lucio got him a job as custodian in the Rio de la Plata cinematographic studios. In 1937, he was hired as director and screenwriter for the movies Dos amigos y un amor (Two friends and one love) and Veinticuatro horas de libertad (Twenty-four hours of liberty), both starring comedy actor Pepe Iglesias. In 1939, he directed El hijo del barrio (1940, Son of the neighborhood), Corazón the Turco (1940, Turkish Heart) and Chingolo (1941) all of them with their own script. This movie was well received by the public and critics, “It consolidated the exceptional tech team accompanied by Artistas Argentinos Asociados: his brother Lucio on the music band, the assistant Hugo Fregones, the montajussta Carlos Rinaldi, the set builder Ralph Pappier, the lighting specialist from the United States Bob Roberts (from the American Society of Cinematographers), the cinematographer Humberto Peruzzi, the electrician Serafín de la Iglesia, the make up artist Roberto Combi and some others.” The following movie was El cura gaucho, in which he met Enrique Muriño, but even with his abundant commercial success, he was fired from Pampa Films.

=== Filming ===
Lucas Demare thought that January and February (summer) were the best months to work on the filming in Salta but they were told that it was better to do it in winter due to summer being flood season. Demare travelled to Salta to reconnoiter the area. Later, the crew and equipment moved to an old estate and big house. They worked on a big ballroom and had two small rooms; each crewman had a cot and an upside down beer wooden box as night-stand. The actresses and Enrique Muiño, due to his age, stayed in a hotel.

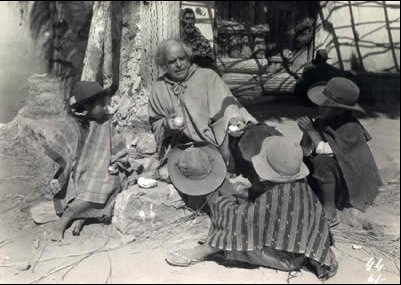
Enrique Muiño

At their arrival in Salta, they met with the local military commander, Colonel Lanús, but he was not eager to help, instead placing obstacles in their way. Demare told how they solved the problem:

"Then I asked the team, Muiño, Petrone, if they'd allow me to read the book to them. We gathered governor Aráoz, the chief of police, and local citizens and politicians for a reading. I put so much enthusiasm in it, that at the end, all of Salta was eager to help. Afterwards Lanús even have us an army fencing teacher to train the actors."

Demare had brought gaucho clothing for the cast, but he realized they were not appropriate for the feel he wanted in the movie as they were brand-new, so he traded the new clothing for local gauchos' own clothing. Demare sent Magaña and Chiola on long horse rides to "weather" their uniforms and accustom the actors to riding. The locals were surprised to encounter two soldiers in antiquated uniforms.

Lucas Demare shows up in the film as an extra a few times. The scene in which the town burns had to be done in one take as they could not afford to rebuild it. Demare had the cameramen and the rest of the crew dressed as gauchos or royalist troops so that if they were accidentally included, they would not ruin the shot. While directing this scene, a sudden wind change moved the fire towards Demare himself making him lose his wig and singeing his fake beard and mustache.

In another scene, Demare played the part of a Spanish soldier who, being attacked by the gauchos, receives a lance hit through the chest. Magaña tells

I threw the lance from above the camera; and hit him full on the chest. I made him such a black-and-blue mark that he required medical attention. He had big beruises and hematomas from so many hits, and he still ordered: "Again! Again!. I thought they would kill him...".

In another scene where the characters played by Amelia Bence, Petrone and Magaña argue, the latter was supposed to fall down the stairs but doubted his ability to do so. Demare stood at the top of the stairs with his back to it and rolled down, to demonstrate that the scene could be done without undue risk. This was in fact the sequence shown in the movie.

A scene where a group of horses ran down a hill with burning branches tied to their tails needed to be filmed from in front, so the crew built a hut made of wood, stones, and rocks in which stood Peruzzi the cameraman, who tells that "At the order of Action! I saw this mass of heads and hooves coming at me at full speed, and did not breath until I saw them open up to the sides of the hut, right in front of me. We had to improvise and replace the lack of technology with smarts, ingenuity and valor."

The filming included more than 1,000 actors as extras for the crowd scenes, although only eighty actors had speaking parts. Among the extras there were local gauchos hired by the producers and others provided as laborers by their employer, the Patrón Costa, a wealthy local family. There were also the aforementioned fencing trainer and soldiers lent by the military garrison and two pato players from Buenos Aires, experts falling from horses. As the gauchos did not want to be dressed as Spaniards, military conscripts played the part.

=== Location ===
For the scenes in the local village where the royalists had established their headquarters, they selected the village of San Fernando. Nearby is the Gallinato Creek, where they filmed the gaucho encampment scenes and the assault against Miranda's woman.

They brought material from Salta in fifty trucks to build a village. It had an area of about a thousand square meters, fifteen houses, a church with a belfry, hospital, horse barn, corrals, commander's office, cemetery, and ovens, all of which was destroyed by the fire in the final scenes. The director requested five hundred horses, four hundred cattle, oxen, mules, burros and chickens. Also many props such as wheelbarrows, wagons, and period-military equipment.

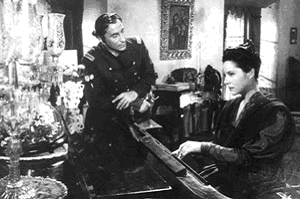
Sebastián Chiola y Amelia Bence

The interior and exterior scens of the Asunción ranch, the royalist encampment at night, the interior of the church and belfry, the death of the child and the musical number by the Ábalos Brothers group were filmed at the studios in Buenos Aires.

Filming delays meant that the producers spent part of the monies they had earned on the film El Viejo Hucha. To recoup this, they had to undersell the exhibition rights in advance in some areas. Spending as little as possible, the production ended up costing 269,000 pesos approximately 55,000 US dollars. The extras in Salta were paid between 3 and 4 pesos per workday, when a theater seat cost 3 pesos. Amelia Bence was paid 5,000 pesos for about six days of filming. This was completely recouped in the nineteen weeks the film stayed at the opening theaters.

The musical numbers and native dances were choreographed and played by the Ábalos Brothers group.

== Soundtrack and Film Score ==
The music score was done by Lucio Demare, a composer and brother of director Lucas Demare. Born in Buenos Aires on 9 August 1906, Lucio studied music from the age of six and from the age of eight he was playing piano in movie theatres –it was still the age of silent movies.

In Spain in 1933, Demare created the music for two movies in which he also acted. He started his work in Argentine cinema in 1936 with the musical score for the film Ya tiene comisario el pueblo ("The Village Now Has a Constable"), directed by Claudio Martínez Payva, and in 1938, he continued with Dos amigos y un amor ("Two Friends and One Love"), with Francisco Canaro, and also directed by his brother Lucas Demare.

== Reception ==
La guerra gaucha was well received by the critics and the public and received several awards. The article in the El Heraldo de Buenos Aires said:

"A strong story, in which combat action is combined with general combat scenes, with a level of sophistication never before reached in our cinema, with local northern flavor, with remarkable authenticity. It can stand next to epic foreign productions for its excellent technique, the beauty and majesty of the sceneries and the excellent acting."

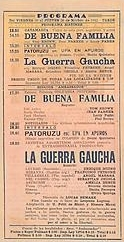
La Guerra Gaucha program

La Nación said:

"By the magnitude of the enterprise, the reality and the imagination; the dignity of the way it presents our war and for the patriotic exultation that it shows; for the vigor and interest, because they were able to show in their images of "the blood of the land" it can be said that the gaucho war accomplishes, as a high expression of our cinema, the transcendence of the fight that it evokes and the beauty of the admirable book that was its inspiration.

Claudio España wrote:

" La guerra gaucha is a classic epic in our cinematography. The stories of Leopoldo Lugones transferred to the silver screen in loose but vigorous images, within a spectacular frame un marco and recognizably national, along with a very interesting story, gave the film a quality seal that your screen required.

The opinion of film critic José Agustín Mahieu is as follows:

"A sometimes conventional story in its structure, but dynamic, full of action and adventure (a European critic referred to it as a "gaucho western") full of an epic feel. Its undoubtable sincerity and vibrance even today it reaches the Argentine spectator. If its objective effect (once the patriotic emotion is removed) is less convincing, it is due, perhaps, to its theme elements and film expression did not go deep on the historic essence of the event; preferring instead to show the classic epic elements: true heroes, pure sentiments, valor and sacrifice, in a somewhat elementary form; the film loses sight of the authentic sense, inexorable and terrible of the total movement of a people that fight for their freedom. The anecdote, the heroic vignette, of easy patriotic feel replaces the broad lines of a vision that could transcend in this epic story to a universal communication. The gaucho war can now be elementary and almost school-like, naïve and expressively elementary. Though, its basic insufficiencies of form and concept notwithstanding, it has an authentic charm, fruit of its sincerity and vigor."

Lastly, César Maranghello says:

"Justly the character of this popular epic that Lugones vindicated when he said "the gaucho war was in reality anonymous as all national resistance movements are" is proof that the screenplay writers could collect an underground force that would soon result in decisive history events: the anonymous gauchos, the military man that deserts the Spanish troops to join the creole rebels, or the gaucho priest, make a synthesis of the people, army and religion that would be present in the revolution of 1943."

The film stayed on the opening theaters for nineteen weeks where it was seen by 170,000 viewers, including four weeks in Montevideo by that time. Nonetheless, due to the producer partners' lack of business experience and their scant resources put into starting the business, critical and public acclaim did not translate into big earnings.

== Awards ==
La guerra gaucha received the following awards:

- The Silver Condor for Best Picture, Best Director (L. Demare), and Best Screenplay (Ulyses Petit de Murat y Homero Manzi) from the Argentine Film Critics Association
- The Condor Diploma for Best Picture, Best Director, Best Screenplay (Petit de Murat and Manzi), Main Actor (Francisco Petrone), Best Sound Editing and Best Cinematography, from the Argentine Academy of Cinematography Arts and Sciences
- Best Screenplay (Petit de Murat and Manzi), from the Comisión Nacional de Cultura
- First prize for Best Picture, Best Director, Best Screenplay, Best Lead Actress (Amelia Bence), Best Actor (Francisco Petrone), Best Photography, Best Music and Best Sound Editing, from Municipalidad de la Ciudad de Buenos Aires
- Best Foreign film in Cuba shown in 1947, from the Asociación de Cronistas Cinematográficos de La Habana (Cuba, 1948)

== Authorization ==
This article incorporates material from ataquenuclear.com, which has given authorization to the use of content and images and published them under GNU license.
