= Where Words Fail =

1946 film by Hugo Fregonese

- Directed by: Hugo Fregonese
- Written by: Homero Manzi; Ulises Petit de Murat
- Starring: Enrique Muiño; Dario Garzay; Héctor Méndez
- Cinematography: José María Beltrán
- Edited by: Atilio Rinaldi
- Music by: Juan José Castro
- Production company: Artistas Argentinos Asociados
- Distributed by: Metro-Goldwyn-Mayer
- Release date: 25 April 1946
- Running time: 76 minutes
- Country: Argentina
- Language: Spanish

Where Words Fail (Spanish: Donde mueren las palabras) is a 1946 Argentine drama film of the classical period directed by Hugo Fregonese and starring Enrique Muiño, Dario Garzay and Héctor Méndez. The film's sets were designed by the art directors Germán Gelpi and Mario Vanarelli.

In a survey of The 100 Greatest Films of Argentine Cinema carried out by the Museo del Cine Pablo Ducrós Hicken in 2000, the film was 43rd.

== Cast ==
- Enrique Muiño
- Dario Garzay
- Héctor Méndez
- Italo Bertini
- Aurelia Ferrer
- María Ruanova
- René Múgica
- Pablo Cumo
- Linda Lorena
- José A. Vázquez
- Milita Brandon
