= The Earring =

1951 film

- Directed by: León Klimovsky
- Written by: Samuel Eichelbaum; Ulises Petit de Murat
- Based on: The Death Stone by Cornell Woolrich
- Starring: Mirtha Legrand; José Cibrián; Francisco de Paula
- Cinematography: Francis Boeniger
- Edited by: Ricardo Rodríguez Nistal; Atilio Rinaldi
- Music by: Julián Bautista
- Production company: Associated Argentine Artists
- Distributed by: Associated Argentine Artists
- Release date: 10 August 1951
- Running time: 72 minutes
- Country: Argentina
- Language: Spanish

The Earring (Spanish: El pendiente) is a 1951 Argentine thriller film of the classical era of Argentine cinema, directed by León Klimovsky and starring Mirtha Legrand, José Cibrián, Francisco de Paula and Héctor Calcaño. It is a film noir based on the story "The Death Stone" by Cornell Woolrich. It was shot at the Estudios Baires in Buenos Aires. The film's sets were designed by the art directors Germán Gelpi and Mario Vanarelli.

== Synopsis ==
A woman pays a call on a former lover, and leaves an earring behind. This threatens to become an incriminating clue when the man is subsequently found murdered.

== Cast ==
- Graciliano Batista as Juan
- María Esther Buschiazzo as Raulito's grandmother
- Héctor Calcaño as the Inspector
- Carlos Campagnale as Raulito
- Pina Castro as Ernestina
- José Cibrián as Roberto Vélez
- Francisco de Paula as Luciano Varela
- Raúl del Valle as Aureliano Quiroga
- Rafael Diserio as Car washer
- Carmen Giménez as Raulito's mother
- Eliseo Herrero as the Milkman
- Mirtha Legrand as Hilda
- Carlitos Peckman as Birthday boy
- Raúl Miller
- Enrique Boyer
- Ivonne Montero
- Enrique Nunez
- Jorge Lezama

== See also ==
- List of Argentine films of 1951

== Bibliography ==
- Spicer, Andrew. Historical Dictionary of Film Noir. Scarecrow Press, 2010.
