= Suburb (film) =

- Directed by: León Klimovsky
- Written by: Ulises Petit de Murat
- Starring: Pedro López Lagar; Fanny Navarro; Zoe Ducós
- Cinematography: Humberto Peruzzi
- Edited by: Gerardo Rinaldi
- Music by: Julián Bautista; Sebastián Piana
- Production company: Emelco
- Release date: 1951
- Running time: 93 minutes
- Country: Argentina
- Language: Spanish

Suburb (Spanish: Suburbio) is a 1951 Argentine drama film of the classical era of Argentine cinema, directed by León Klimovsky and starring Pedro López Lagar, Fanny Navarro and Zoe Ducós. The film portrays life in one of the poorer neighborhoods of Buenos Aires. Under pressure from the Peronist authorities, Klimovsky changed the ending to suggest that the problems of such communities were now a thing of the past.

== Cast ==
In alphabetical order

- Juan Alighieri
- Leo Alza
- Arturo Arcari
- Graciliano Batista
- Olga Berg
- Félix Camino
- Rosa Catá
- Margarita Corona
- Alberto de Mendoza
- Zoe Ducos
- Roberto Durán
- Mauricio Espósito
- Roberto Guthie
- Angélica López Gamio
- Pedro López Lagar
- Pedro Maratea
- José Maurer
- Fernanda Mistral
- Yuki Nambá
- Fanny Navarro
- Juan Pecci
- Fernando Siro
- Enrique Thomas
- Aldo Vega

== Bibliography ==
- Michael Pigott & Santiago Oyarzabel. World Film Locations: Buenos Aires. Intellect Ltd, 2014.
