= Bob Roberts (cinematographer) =

American cinematographer

Bob Roberts (1899–1954) was an American cinematographer, noted for his work as a cinematographer during the Golden Age of Argentine Cinema from the late 1930s to the early 1950s. Before moving to Argentina in the late 1930s he worked on W. S. Van Dyke's White Shadows in the South Seas (1928). In 1944 the Argentine Academy of Cinematography Arts and Sciences gave Roberts the "Best Cinematographer" award for the critically acclaimed Su mejor alumno, and at the 1946 Argentine Film Critics Association Awards he won the Silver Condor Award for Best Cinematography with Humberto Peruzzi and José María Beltrán for Pampa bárbara (1945). He worked on films like The Three Musketeers (1946), Madame Bovary (1947) and Facundo, el tigre de los llanos (1952). His last film was with Julio Porter on Marianela (1955).

== Selected filmography ==
- Santos Vega (1936)
- The Gaucho Priest (1941)
- His Best Student (1944)
- The Abyss Opens (1945)
- Savage Pampas (1945)
- The Three Rats (1946)
- Juan Moreira (1948)
- A Story of the Nineties (1949)
- My Poor Beloved Mother (1948)
