= Medio millón por una mujer =

- Directed by: Francisco Múgica
- Written by: Arturo Cerretani from the play by Louis Verneuil
- Starring: Eva Franco, Elías Alippi and Enrique Serrano
- Cinematography: José María Beltrán
- Edited by: Juan Soffici
- Music by: Enrique Delfino
- Production company: Lumiton
- Release date: 6 March 1940
- Running time: 91 minutes
- Country: Argentina
- Language: Spanish

Medio millón por una mujer (Half a Million for a Woman) is a 1940 Argentine film of the Golden Age of Argentine cinema, directed by Francisco Múgica.

== Production ==
The 91-minute black and white film was directed for Lumiton by Francisco Múgica. The script was written by Arturo Cerretani. The comedy was based on a play by Louis Verneuil, and retained its theatrical structure despite being filmed with a moving camera. The film starred Eva Franco, Elías Isaac Alippi and Enrique Serrano.

== Synopsis ==
The film is a sophisticated comedy where Elías Alippi plays a playboy who plans the kidnapping of Eva Franco, unhappy wife of millionaire miser. He poses as a doctor. The consequences are unexpected.

== Reception ==
In the 1940s established film producers were looking to capture foreign markets, while others felt that films should be authentic to local traditions. The critic Raimundo Calcagno ("Calki") saw no conflict. In his view Medio millón por una mujer was an example of a film with a local theme that could be shown in foreign markets and that would give prestige to the Argentine film industry. It could compete with any frivolous comedy made in Hollywood.

== Cast ==
The cast included:

- Eva Franco
- Elías Alippi
- Enrique Serrano
- Teresa Serrador
- Juan Mangiante
- José Ruzzo
- Cirilo Etulain
- Alfredo Fornaresio
- Carlos Rodríguez
