= His Best Student =

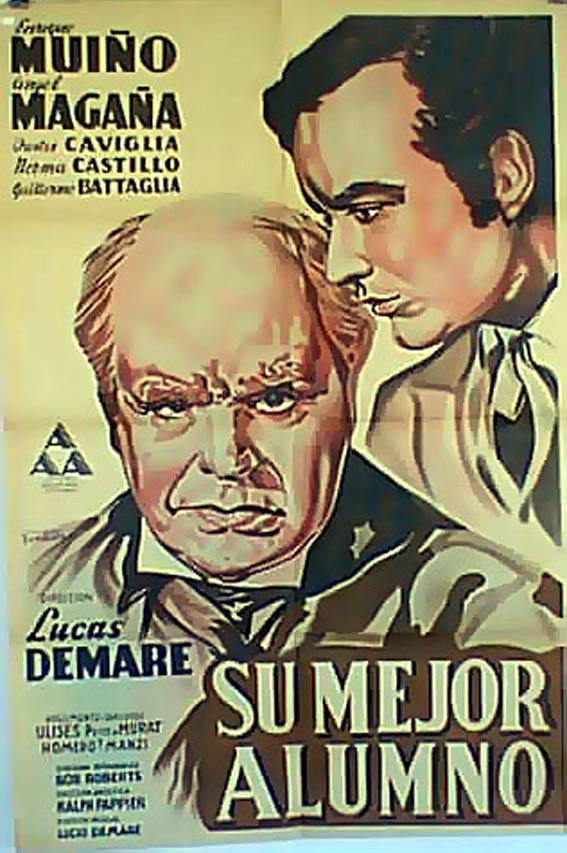
- Directed by: Lucas Demare
- Written by: Homero Manzi, Ulises Petit de Murat
- Based on: Vida de Dominguito by Domingo F. Sarmiento
- Starring: Enrique Muiño and Ángel Magaña
- Cinematography: Bob Roberts
- Edited by: Carlos Rinaldi
- Music by: Lucio Demare
- Release date: 22 May 1944 (Buenos Aires)
- Running time: 114 minutes
- Country: Argentina
- Language: Spanish

His Best Student (Spanish:Su mejor alumno) is a 1944 Argentine biographical film of the classical period directed by Lucas Demare and starring Enrique Muiño and Ángel Magaña. It was released in Buenos Aires on 22 May 1944. The film won many awards, including the award for best film of the year.

In a survey of the 100 greatest films of Argentine cinema carried out by the Museo del Cine Pablo Ducrós Hicken in 2000, the film reached the 39th position.

== Synopsis ==
The film is an emotional enactment of the life of Domingo Sarmiento, the son of a former president of Argentina and the father of public education in the country, Domingo Faustino Sarmiento (Enrique Muiño). "Dominguito" volunteers to fight in the Paraguayan War, in which he dies. It is based on Vida de Dominguito ("Dominguito's life"), written by his father.

== Cast ==
The cast included:

- Enrique Muiño (Domingo Faustino Sarmiento)
- Ángel Magaña (Dominguito)
- Orestes Caviglia
- Norma Castillo
- Guillermo Battaglia
- María Esther Buschiazzo
- Hugo Pimentel
- Alberto de Mendoza
- Judith Sulián
- Domingo Márquez
- Bernardo Perrone
- René Mugica
- Pedro Fiorito
- Horacio Priani
- Mario Lozano
- César Fiaschi
- Warly Ceriani
- Américo Sanjurjo
- Alberto Terrones
- Pablo Cumo
- Carlos Lagrotta
- Arsenio Perdiguero
- Carmen Giménez

== Awards ==
The Argentine Academy of Cinematography Arts and Sciences gave a number of awards for the film:

- Best Picture: Artistas Argentinos Asociados
- Best director: Lucas Demare
- Best original story Ulyses Petit de Murat and Homero Manzi
- Best Actor Enrique Muiño
- Best scenography Ralph Pappier
- Best cinematographer Bob Roberts
- Best sound Ramón Ator
- Best editing Carlos Rinaldi

At the 1945 Argentine Film Critics Association Awards the film won Best Film, Best Director, Best Actor (Enrique Muiño), Best Adapted Screenplay (Ulises Petit de Murat, Homero Manzi) and Best Camera Operator (Humberto Peruzzi).
