= Zoe Ducós =

Argentine actress

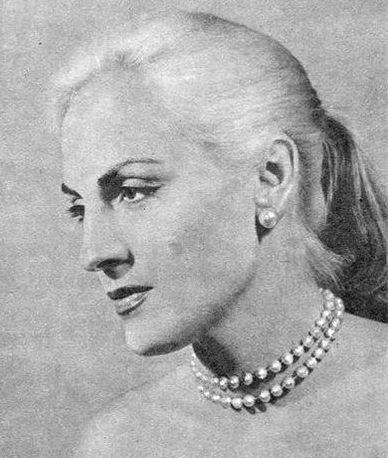
- Zoe Ducós in 1970
- Born: Zoe Celia Ducós Gallegos; March 6, 1928; Buenos Aires, Argentina
- Died: November 11, 2002 (aged 74); Caracas, Venezuela
- Occupation: Actress
- Years active: 1948–1993
- Spouses: José María Fernández Unsáin (m. 1949; div. 1966): Miguel Silvio Sanz (m. 19??; died 19??); Carlos Stevani
- Partners: Genaro Salinas; Héctor Hernández Vera

Zoe Celia Ducós Gallegos (March 6, 1928 – November 11, 2002) was an Argentine film, stage, and television actress of the classical era of Argentine cinema.

== Biography ==
Ducós studied at the National Conservatory of Music and Performing Arts and upon graduation, earned the Grand Prize of Honor bestowed by the National Commission of Culture for best actress in the National Competition of Vocational Theatres. The prize included a contract to join the cast of Teatro Nacional Cervantes, in which she performed between 1948 and 1951.

== Personal life ==
Ducós had a relationship with Mexican singer Genaro Salinas, that was married and he was acting in Buenos Aires, then she married writer and film director José María Fernández Unsáin, but they divorced. Ducós settled in Venezuela, where she married Miguel Silvio Sanz, head of the dreaded police of dictator Marcos Pérez Jiménez. In 1957 Ducós came back to Argentina, where she starred the films Libertad bajo palabra, in 1961, and ten years later Pájaro Loco. After her husband died, she returned to Venezuela at the beginning of the 1970s. She married film director Carlos Stevani. At the end of the 1990s Ducós was diagnosed with Alzheimer's disease and admitted to the nursing home Instituto geriátrico en Colinas de Bello Monte, where she died of a stroke on November 11, 2002, in Caracas, Venezuela.

== Career ==
In 1948, Ducós debuted in the critically acclaimed film Dios se lo pague, directed by Luis César Amadori. Without abandoning her stage work, she continued filming in later years. For her role in Suburban directed by León Klimovsky, she was awarded Best Actress by the Association of Cinema Writers of Argentina. In 1952, Ducós settled in Venezuela after a visit through Spain, and debuted at the Teatro Municipal. She appeared on Radio Caracas Televisión. Ducós continued her theater work and also participated in many telenovelas.

== Filmography ==
Actress

- Pájaro loco (1971)
- Libertad bajo palabra (1961) … Mujer embarazada
- La de los ojos color del tiempo (1952)
- Río turbio (1952)
- Facundo, el tigre de los llanos (1952)
- La Muerte en las calles (1952)
- De turno con la muerte (1951)
- Los árboles mueren de pie (1951)
- Suburb (1951)
- El puente (1950)
- Nacha Regules (1950)
- La cuna vacía (1949)
- Dios se lo pague (1948) ... Perikles
- Passport to Rio (1948) … Cora

Screenwriter

- Retén de mujeres (1988)

Casting director

- Retén de mujeres (1988)

== Television ==
- Amor de papel (1993) Series
- Macarena (1992) Series
- La mujer prohibida (1991) Series.... Fiorella Di Salvatori
- Pobre diabla (1990) Series.... Doña Roberta Mejía Guzmán
- La sombra de Piera (1989) Series
- Cristal (1985) Series.... Luisa
- Topacio (1984) Series.... Sor Piedad
- Luisana mía.... Estela de Bernal (1 episode, 1981)
- Elizabeth (1980) Series
- Rosangela (1979) Series.... Amanda
- Daniela (1978) Series.... Cruz Dolores
- Carolina (1976) Series.... Enriqueta Villacastin
- Tu rebelde ternura (1975) Series.... Malisa
- La loba (1973) Series.... Erika Heller
- Nacido para odiarte (1971) Series.... Clarita
