= From Man to Man =

1949 film

- Directed by: Hugo Fregonese
- Written by: Carlos Alberto Orlando
- Starring: Tito Alonso; Jorge Arias; Luis de Lucía
- Cinematography: Francis Boeniger
- Edited by: Atilio Rinaldi
- Music by: Isidro B. Maiztegui
- Release date: 1949
- Running time: 77 minutes
- Country: Argentina
- Language: Spanish

From Man to Man (Spanish:De hombre a hombre) is a 1949 Argentine film directed by Hugo Fregonese during the classical era of Argentine cinema. The film's art direction was by Germán Gelpi and Mario Vanarelli.

== Cast ==
- Tito Alonso
- Jorge Arias
- Luis de Lucía
- Cirilo Etulain
- Aurelia Ferrer
- Rene Fischer Bauer
- Norma Giménez
- Josefa Goldar
- Raúl Luar
- Enrique Muiño
- Nathán Pinzon
- Osvaldo Terranova
- Ricardo Trigo

== Bibliography ==
- Rist, Peter H. Historical Dictionary of South American Cinema. Rowman & Littlefield, 2014.
