= Domingo Sapelli =

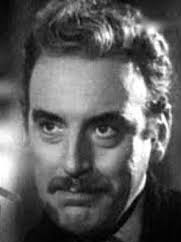
- Born: 1895; Uruguay
- Died: 1961 (aged 65–66); Buenos Aires, Argentina
- Occupation: Actor
- Years active: 1933–1960 (film)

Domingo Sapelli (1895–1961) was a Uruguayan stage and film actor. After emigrating to Argentina he appeared in around fifty films during his career.

== Selected filmography ==
- The Soul of the Accordion (1935)
- Santos Vega (1936)
- Juan Moreira (1936)
- The Caranchos of Florida (1938)
- Only the Valiant (1940)
- Savage Pampas (1945)
- María Rosa (1946)
- Juan Moreira (1948)
- Passport to Rio (1950)
- Fangio, the Demon of the Tracks (1950)
- Marianela (1955)

== Bibliography ==
- Finkielman, Jorge. The Film Industry in Argentina: An Illustrated Cultural History. McFarland, 24 Dec 2003.
