= Hugo Fregonese =

Argentina-born film director (1908–1987)

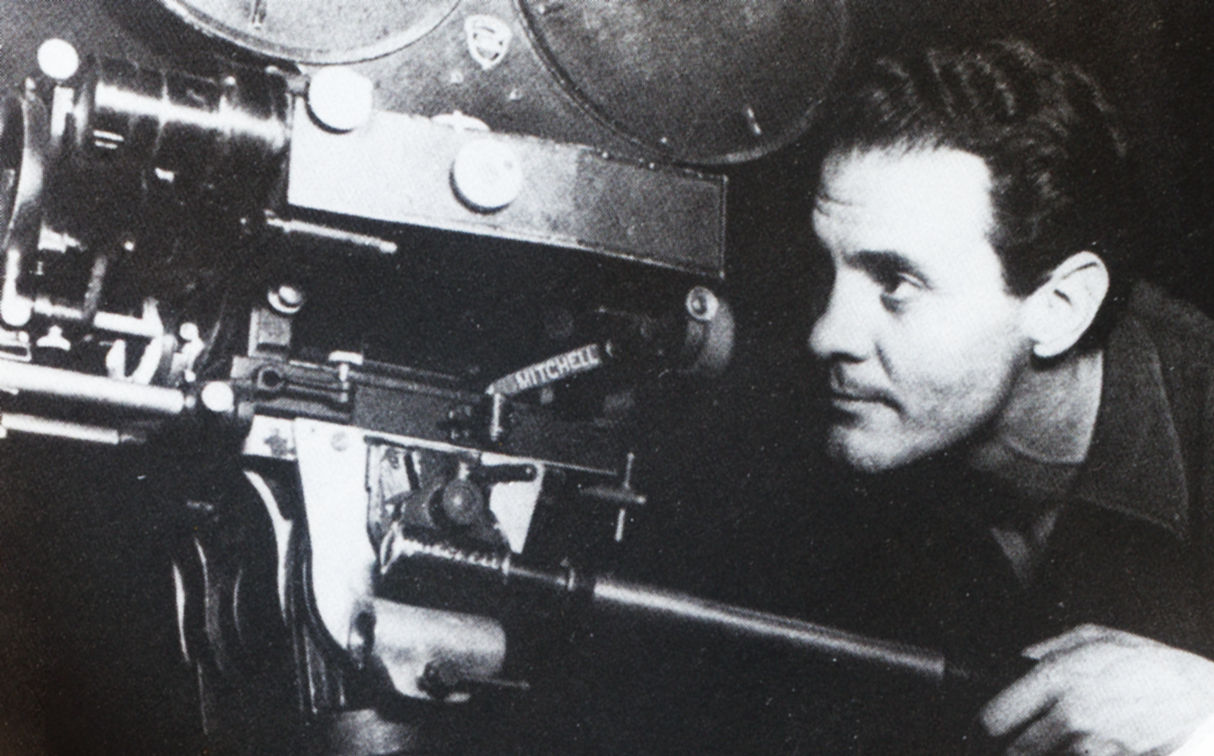
- Fregonese in the 1950s
- Born: Hugo Geronimo Fregonese; April 8, 1908; Mendoza, Argentina
- Died: January 11, 1987 (aged 78); Tigre, Buenos Aires Province, Argentina
- Education: Columbia University
- Occupations: Director, screenwriter
- Years active: 1935–1975
- Notable work: Savage Pampas; My Six Convicts; Decameron Nights; Blowing Wild; Black Tuesday; Marco Polo; The Secret of Dr. Mabuse
- Spouse: Faith Domergue (m. 1947; div. 1958)
- Children: 2

Hugo Geronimo Fregonese (8 April 1908 – 11 January 1987) was an Argentine film director and screenwriter who worked both in Hollywood and his home country during the classical era of Argentine cinema.

He made his directorial debut in 1943. In 1949, he directed Apenas un delincuente. Most of Fregonese's American films were Westerns and crime melodramas, like Man in the Attic (1953) and Black Tuesday (1954). He worked with renowned actors such as Gary Cooper, Barbara Stanwyck, Anthony Quinn, Edward G. Robinson, Luisa Vehil, Víctor Laplace, Soledad Silveyra, Paul Naschy, and Joel McCrea.

For directing the now-almost forgotten film My Six Convicts (1952), Fregonese was nominated for the Directors Guild of America Award for Outstanding Directing - Feature Film.

== Biography ==
Fregonese was born in Mendoza. A former sports journalist, Fregonese attended Columbia University in 1935, and then was hired to be a technical advisor for films with Latin American themes. By 1938, he was again living in Argentina. There he worked as an editor, assistant director, and short film director before heading to Hollywood, where he developed much of his career as a feature film director.

Fregonese and actress Faith Domergue were married in secret in Ciudad Juárez on October 8, 1947, hours after she divorced bandleader Teddy Stauffer there. Their first child, Diana Maria, was born on January 1, 1949, in Buenos Aires. Their second child, John Anthony, was born on August 22, 1951, in Los Angeles. John, who became an urban planner, died on what would have been his mother's 94th birthday. The couple separated twice before Domergue was granted an uncontested divorce on June 24, 1958.

In his later years, Fregonese directed some pictures in Europe. In 1971, he returned to Argentina, where he continued to make films. While living in the city of Tigre Fregonese suffered a heart attack and died aged 78.

== Partial filmography ==
- Savage Pampas (1945)
- Where Words Fail (1946)
- Apenas un delincuente (English title: Hardly a Criminal, 1949)
- From Man to Man (1949)
- One Way Street (1950)
- Saddle Tramp (1950)
- The Mark of the Renegade (1951)
- Apache Drums (1951)
- My Six Convicts (1952)
- Untamed Frontier (1952)
- Decameron Nights (1953)
- Blowing Wild (1953)
- Man in the Attic (1953)
- The Raid (1954)
- Black Tuesday (1954)
- The Wanderers (1956)
- Seven Thunders (1957)
- Harry Black (1958)
- Marco Polo (1961)
- Old Shatterhand (1964)
- The Secret of Dr. Mabuse (1964)
- Last Plane to Baalbek (1964)
- Savage Pampas (1966)
- Los Monstruos del Terror, also known as Dracula vs. Frankenstein (uncredited director, 1970)
- The Bad Life (1973)
- Beyond the Sun (1975)
