= It Always Ends That Way =

1939 film

- Directed by: Enrique Susini
- Written by: Robert Dieudonné (novel); Darol Fischbacher; Gherardo Gherardi; Enrique Susini
- Produced by: Walter Mocchi
- Starring: Vittorio De Sica; Nedda Francy; Roberto Rey; Noëlle Norman
- Cinematography: Arturo Gallea
- Edited by: Darol Fischbacher
- Music by: Ezio Carabella
- Production company: Excelsa Film
- Distributed by: Minerva Film
- Release date: 29 November 1939
- Running time: 68 minutes
- Country: Italy
- Language: Italian

It Always Ends That Way (Italian: Finisce sempre così) is a 1939 Italian musical comedy film directed by Enrique Susini and starring Vittorio De Sica, Nedda Francy and Roberto Rey. The film was based on a novel by Robert Dieudonné. It was shot at the Cinecittà studios in Rome with sets designed by Salvo D'Angelo.

== Plot ==
Alberto Milnar, a young organist and composer, disappointed in love by his careless cousin, marries a friend of his who lives in Budapest. He naively sends him some of his music, which the friend exploits with a publisher by pretending to be the author. He goes to the Hungarian capital, where he happens upon his friends' house just as a marital storm has erupted due to his wife's jealousy. His old love is reawakened, and he promises to help her uncover her husband's infidelity. He then accompanies her to a venue where her husband's friend is performing. But Alberto, recognizing the songs she sings as his own, declares this publicly to everyone present, much to everyone's disbelief. Meanwhile, his cousin divorces her unfaithful husband, telling Alberto that she wants to marry him for a second time. He accepts, but soon realizes that she is no longer in love with him, but still passionately in love with her ex-husband. He generously gives her back her voice, and while he is about to return to the village sad and embittered, a pretty admirer of his, Maritza, who has come to the city to look for him, will be the one who will finally open his heart to love.

== Cast ==
- Vittorio De Sica as Alberto Miller
- Nedda Francy as Elisabetta
- Roberto Rey as Renato
- Noëlle Norman as Mariza Kalmay
- Pina Renzi as La signora Kalmay
- Assia De Busny as Florika
- Eugenia Zaresca as Daisy
- Alfredo Robert as Il parrocco
- Eugenio Duse as Il regista
- Carlo Chertier as Il critico Feroski
- Alfredo Bracchi as Il paroliere
- Ernesto Calindri as Un cameriere
- Vasco Creti as L'investigatore privato
- Liana Del Balzo as La cameriera dell' albergo
- Mario Ersanilli as Un paesano
- Mimosa Favi as L'amica di Elisabetta
- Walter Grant as Un padrino
- Alfredo Martinelli as Il marchese Ignazio Kovacs
- Giovanni Onorato as Il pianista stonato
- Alda Perosino as La cameriera
- Emilio Petacci as Un contadino barbuto
- Carlo Ranieri as Un anziano paesano
- Roberto as Un ballerino
- Gustavo Serena as Janosh, il maggiordomo

== Bibliography ==
- Goble, Alan. The Complete Index to Literary Sources in Film. Walter de Gruyter, 1999.
