= José María Fernández Unsáin =

Argentine filmmaker and playwright (1918–1997)

- Born: José María Fernández Unsáin; 10 August 1918; Diamante, Argentina
- Died: 18 June 1997 (aged 78); Mexico City, Mexico
- Other names: Janos Benedek, Coco; Cacho, Pompon
- Occupations: Director, screenwriter, playwright
- Years active: 1935–1997
- Spouses: Olivia Michelle (divorced); Zoe Ducós (m. 1949; div. 1966) Jacqueline Andere (m. 1967)
- Children: 4, including Chantal Andere

José María Fernández Unsáin (10 August 1918 – 18 June 1997) was an Argentine film director, screenwriter, and playwright.

== Biography ==
Although he studied medicine, Fernández Unsain chose literature as his career.

He was exiled to Mexico after the 1955 Revolución Libertadora because of his cultural relationship with Eva Perón and the National Theatre of Comedy (Cervantes National Theatre), where he was the first director, and the Labour Worker Theatre of the General Confederation of Workers (CGT), which he co-founded with other artists and directors.

He migrated to Mexico in 1958 and worked on the screenplays of hundreds of films over the next several decades, including Sed de amor directed by Alfonso Corona Blake (1958); La diligencia de la muerte directed by Rogelio A. González (1959); De tal palo tal astilla directed by Miguel M. Delgado (1959); Ladrón que roba a ladrón directed by Jaime Salvador (1959); La nave de los monstruos directed by Rogelio A. González (1959); and Sinful. He also directed several films in the 1960s and 1970s.

In 1976, Fernández Unsain became the president of the newly formed SOGEM (Sociedad General de Escritores de Mexico), an organization which strives to guarantee the rights of authors. He held this post until his death in 1997.

Fernández Unsain is survived by his widow, actress Jacqueline Andere. He had previously been married to actress Olivia Michelle and to Argentine actress Zoe Ducós. He had four children, including actress and singer Chantal Andere.
