= Germán Gelpi =

Argentine artist and art director

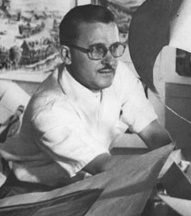
- Gelpi in 1954
- Born: 28 August 1909; Buenos Aires, Argentina
- Died: 25 November 1982 (aged 73); Buenos Aires, Argentina
- Occupations: Artist, art director
- Years active: 1943–1975 (film)

Germán Gelpi (1909–1982) was an Argentine artist and art director designing sets for films and the theatre. Gelpi worked on more than eighty films in a career that began during the Golden Age of Argentine Cinema.

== Selected filmography ==
- Savage Pampas (1945)
- Where Words Fail (1946)
- From Man to Man (1949)
- The Earring (1951)
- To Live for a Moment (1951)
- Sucedió en Buenos Aires (1954)

== Bibliography ==
- Pellettieri, Osvaldo. Historia del teatro argentino en las provincias, Volume 2. Editorial Galerna, 2005.
