= Nathán Pinzón =

Argentine actor

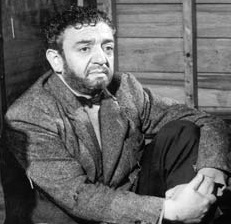
Nathán Pinzón

Nathán Pinzón (27 February 1917 – 15 August 1993) was an Argentine actor. He starred in the 1962 film Una Jaula no tiene secretos.

== Selected filmography ==
- Santos Vega (1936)
- Juan Moreira (1948)
- Passport to Rio (1948)
- Paradise (1953)
- The Count of Monte Cristo (1953)
- Carnival of Crime (1962)
- Los Neuróticos (1971)
- El Gordo catástrofe (1977)
- ,”El Vampíro Negro” (1953) Teodoro Ulber, 'El profesor'
- Los Matamonstruos en la mansion del terror (1987)
