= Savage Pampas (1966 film) =

1966 film

- Theatrical poster
- Directed by: Hugo Fregonese
- Written by: Homero Manzi; Ulises Petit de Murat; John Melson; Hugo Fregonese
- Produced by: Samuel Bronston; Jaime Prades
- Starring: Robert Taylor; Ron Randell; Marc Lawrence; Ty Hardin
- Cinematography: Manuel Berenguer
- Edited by: Juan Serra
- Music by: Waldo de los Ríos
- Production companies: Bronston International; Producciones Jaime Prades
- Distributed by: Comet Pictures (US)
- Release date: 7 July 1966
- Running time: 112 minutes
- Countries: Argentina; Spain; United States
- Language: English

Savage Pampas is a 1966 American Western film directed by Hugo Fregonese and starring Robert Taylor, Ron Randell and Marc Lawrence. The film was a co-production between Argentina, Spain and the United States, and was a remake of the 1945 Argentine film of the same title which Fregonese had co-directed. The film's location shooting took place in Spain, a popular location for westerns during the era. The film's action is set in the Argentine Pampas around the time of the Conquest of the Desert.

== Plot ==
Set during the 1870s, life is hard for soldiers on the outskirts of Argentine control. The pragmatic Captain Martin struggles to retain control over a ragtag Argentine Army, made up of largely conscripted criminals. Joined by Lt. Del Río, who just graduated from the newly created Military Institute of Buenos Aires, Cpt. Martin faces mass desertions due to soldiers refusing to serve at the garrisons for the multi-year military campaign without any women present. Some desperate troops slip off in the night to join the ranks of Padrón, a charismatic bandit who leads an army made up of indigenous fighters and army deserters. Padrón offers women to soldiers who changes sides, and many men have taken notice. Cpt. Martin looks to turn the tables: he gets approval for his new plan of bringing women the men of his garrison.

== Cast ==
- Robert Taylor as Captain Martín
- Ron Randell as Padrón
- Marc Lawrence as Sargent Barril
- Ty Hardin as Miguel Carreras
- Rosenda Monteros as Rucu
- Ángel del Pozo as Lt. Del Río
- Felicia Roc as Camila Ometio
- Charles Fawcett as El Gato, Private
- Enrique Ávila as Petizo
- José Jaspe as Luis, Private
- Julio Peña as Chicha, Private
- Laya Raki as Mimí
- Laura Granados as Carmen
- Ingrid Ohlenschläger as The Old Woman
- José Nieto as Gen. Chávez
- Willie Ellie as Chief Winkon
- Barta Barri as Priest
- José María Caffarel as Vigo
- Juan Carlos Galván as Isidro
- Sancho Gracia as Carlos
- Mario Lozano as Santiago
- Isabel Pisano as Lucy
- Lucía Prado as Chiquito
- Milo Quesada as Alfonso
- Héctor Quiroga as Pepe, Private, Batasito Pardon
- George Rigaud as Old Man
- Pastora Ruiz as Magnolia

== Production ==
In 1958 it was announced Stephen Barclay would produce 12 films in Argentina with Mendoza Films and Guaranteed Pictures. They were to include Savage Pampas which was to be produced and directed by Hugo Fregonese. Pampas was based on a true story about an encounter between white settlers and Indians in 1830 Argentina.

The film was not made for another decade.

== Release ==
The film was cut down to approximately 94 minutes in many markets (e.g. Germany).

== See also ==
- List of American films of 1966

== Bibliography ==
- Pitts, Michael R. Western Movies: A Guide to 5,105 Feature Films. McFarland, 2012.
