= La Montaña =

Argentinian socialist revolutionary journal

La Montaña ('The Mountain') was a revolutionary socialist periodical published in Argentina. The newspaper was directed by José Ingenieros and Leopoldo Lugones. The first issue was published on April 1, 1897. The first issue opened with a manifesto, titled "We are Socialists." It was continued by an article against the state ('The Society without a state'), which continued into the second and third issues. La Montaña argued that the state was the result of private property and called for its abolition.

Some of the most provocative content of La Montaña were the attacks on the influence of the Catholic Church by Ingenieros.

Ingenieros later become a prominent sociologist in Argentina whilst Lugones became a prominent national right-wing poet.

The twelve issues of La Montaña were republished by the Universidad Nacional de Quilmes in 1996.
