= Strange Forces =

- Author: Leopoldo Lugones
- Original title: Las fuerzas extrañas
- Language: Spanish
- Publication date: 1906
- Publication place: Argentina
- Media type: Print

Strange Forces (Spanish: Las fuerzas extrañas) is a collection of short stories by Argentine writer Leopoldo Lugones, first published in 1906. Despite having been Lugones' least successful work at that time, it is considered to be a key pioneer in the development of the science fiction and fantasy genres in Argentina.

The stories all deal with the concept of toying beyond the limits of human knowledge, having most a tendency to develop from a scientist’s invitation of a friend in order to share with them the results of their experiments, resulting, ultimately, in disaster.

Jorge Luis Borges, being an important admirer of Lugones, once said:

The literature of America feeds on this work of this great writer; writing well is, for many, writing as Lugones. The pages of "Las Fuerzas Extrañas" are amongst the most accomplished of hispanic literature.

— Jorge Luis Borges

Many of the pseudoscientific explanations used as a basis of the plot of the stories have greatly resembled scientific explanations accepted by mainstream science years later. Such is the case that Lugones himself, following the publishing of the 1926 second edition of the collection, said:

Some theories from this book, with twenty years passed by, notwithstanding the fact that they belong to an age even more behind in knowledge, are now accepted in the scientific field.

— Leopoldo Lugones

== Content ==
The work consists essentially of a collection of twelve short stories:

- The Omega Force (La fuerza omega)
- The Firestorm (La lluvia de fuego)
- An Inexplicable Phenomenon (Un fenómeno inexplicable)
- The Miracle of Saint Wilfred (El milagro de San Wilfrido)
- The Bloat-Toad (El escuerzo)
- Metamusic (La metamúsica)
- Origins of the Flood (El origen del Diluvio)
- The Horses of Abdera (Los caballos de Abdera)
- Viola Acherontia (Viola Acherontia)
- Yzur (Yzur)
- The Pillar of Salt (La estatua de sal)
- Psychon (El Psychon)

Amongst these stories, the most notable include: "The Omega Force”, which deals with the power of sound, "Metamusic", on the visualization of sound, "Viola acherontia", in which a gardener attempts to trigger in flowers the capacity of killing, "Psychon", on the materialization of thoughts, and “Origins of the Flood”, which describes the Earth, specifically its species and landscape, before the Great Flood.

Literature of the time had a tendency to employ monkeys as protagonists, most probably due to the commotion following Darwin's formulation of his theory of evolution, as is the case of two key stories of the collection: "An Inexplicable Phenomenon", in which a fine Englishman discovers, to his horror, his twin soul to be a mere monkey, and "Yzur", which deals with the attempts of the narrator to make a monkey speak.
