= Pedro Aleandro =

Argentine actor

Pedro Aleandro (October 11, 1910 – July 1, 1985 in Buenos Aires) was an Argentine actor. He starred in films such as Albéniz (1947), La de los ojos color del tiempo (1952) and El octavo infierno (1964). He was married to María Luisa Robledo. His daughters, María Vaner and Norma Aleandro, were also actresses.
