= Juan Moreira (1948 film) =

- Directed by: Luis Moglia Barth
- Written by: Eduardo Gutiérrez (novel); Hugo Mac Dougall
- Starring: Floren Delbene; Dorita Ferreyro; Nedda Francy; Fernando Ochoa
- Cinematography: Bob Roberts
- Edited by: Nicolás Proserpio
- Music by: Alejandro Gutiérrez del Barrio
- Production company: Estudios San Miguel
- Distributed by: Estudios San Miguel
- Release date: 11 February 1948
- Running time: 86 minutes
- Country: Argentina
- Language: Spanish

Juan Moreira is a 1948 Argentine historical action film of the classical era of Argentine cinema, directed by Luis Moglia Barth and starring Floren Delbene, Dorita Ferreyro and Nedda Francy. The film is an adaptation of the 1879 novel Juan Moreira by Eduardo Gutiérrez, portraying the life of the nineteenth century guacho and outlaw Juan Moreira.

== Cast ==
- Floren Delbene
- Dora Ferreyro
- Nedda Francy
- Fernando Ochoa
- Domingo Sapelli
- Enrique Zingoni
- Alfonso Pisano
- Enrique Chaico
- Pascual Nacaratti
- Luis Zaballa
- Juan Sarcione
- Cayetano Biondo
- Marino Seré
- Ana Gryn
- Nathán Pinzón
- Alberto Dalbes
- Néstor Feria
- Pablo Cumo

== Bibliography ==
- Goble, Alan. The Complete Index to Literary Sources in Film. Walter de Gruyter, 1999.
