= Atilio Rinaldi =

Argentine film editor

- Occupation: Film editor
- Years active: 1943–1980 (film)

Atilio Rinaldi (died 1980) was an Argentine film editor. He worked on over ninety films during his career.

== Selected filmography ==
- Savage Pampas (1945)
- Where Words Fail (1946)
- From Man to Man (1949)
- The New Bell (1950)
- The Earring (1951)
- To Live for a Moment (1951)
- The Voice of My City (1953)
- Love Never Dies (1955)
- The Candidate (1959)
- Closed Door (1962)

== Bibliography ==
- Peter Cowie & Derek Elley. World Filmography: 1967. Fairleigh Dickinson University Press, 1977.
