= Marianela (1955 film) =

- Directed by: Julio Porter
- Written by: Benito Pérez Galdós (novel), Luis Ordaz, Pablo Palant, Julio Porter
- Cinematography: Vicente Cosentino, Bob Roberts
- Edited by: Nello Melli
- Music by: George Andreani
- Release date: 15 September 1955
- Running time: 94 minutes
- Country: Argentina
- Language: Spanish

Marianela is a 1955 Argentine drama film directed by Julio Porter, and starring Olga Zubarry and José María Gutiérrez. It is based on the 1878 novel by Benito Pérez Galdós. Zubarry won the Silver Condor Award for Best Actress at the 1956 Argentine Association of Film Critics Awards for her performance as the title character.

== Cast ==
- Olga Zubarry as Marianela
- José María Gutiérrez as Pablo
- Pedro Laxalt
- Domingo Sapelli
- Juan Sarcione
- Perla Alvarado
- Julio Esbrez
- Marisa Núñez
- Nora Egle Salemme
