= School of Champions =

- Directed by: Ralph Pappier
- Written by: E. Escobar Bavio, Homero Manzi
- Cinematography: Pablo Tabernero
- Edited by: José Cañizares, O. Viloni
- Music by: Juan Ehlert
- Release date: 19 December 1950
- Running time: 95 minutes
- Country: Argentina
- Language: Spanish

School of Champions (Spanish: Escuela de campeones) is a 1950 Argentine adventure drama film of the classical era of Argentine cinema, directed by Ralph Pappier, and starring George Rigaud, Silvana Roth, and Pedro Quartucci. It won the Silver Condor Award for Best Film, given by the Argentine Film Critics Association in 1951 for the best picture of the previous year.

== Cast ==
- George Rigaud as Alexander Watson Hutton
- Silvana Roth as Margaret Budge
- Pedro Quartucci
- Enrique Muiño as Domingo Faustino Sarmiento
- Enrique Chaico
- Carlos Enríquez
- Héctor Coire
- Gustavo Cavero
- Pablo Cumo
- Hugo Mújica
- Eduardo Ferraro
- Francisco Ferraro
- Marcos Zucker
- Warly Ceriani
- Oscar Villa
