= Savage Pampas (1945 film) =

- Directed by: Lucas Demare; Hugo Fregonese
- Written by: Homero Manzi; Ulises Petit de Murat
- Starring: Francisco Petrone; Luisa Vehil; Domingo Sapelli; Froilán Varela
- Narrated by: Enrique Muiño
- Cinematography: José María Beltrán; Humberto Peruzzi; Bob Roberts
- Edited by: Atilio Rinaldi; Carlos Rinaldi
- Music by: Lucio Demare; Juan Ehlert
- Production company: Artistas Argentinos Asociados
- Distributed by: Artistas Argentinos Asociados
- Release date: 9 October 1945
- Running time: 98 minutes
- Country: Argentina
- Language: Spanish

Savage Pampas (Spanish: Pampa bárbara) is a 1945 Argentine historical epic film of the classical era of Argentine cinema, directed by Lucas Demare and Hugo Fregonese and starring Francisco Petrone, Luisa Vehil and Domingo Sapelli. The film's sets were designed by Germán Gelpi. The film is set in the nineteenth century in the semi-arid Dry Pampas region, when it represented a frontier between Argentine-controlled territory and areas still largely inhabited by Indians before the Conquest of the Desert extended Argentine control southwards. In 1966, Fregonese remade the film in English under the same title.

In a survey of the 100 greatest films of Argentine cinema carried out by the Museo del Cine Pablo Ducrós Hicken in 2000, the film reached the 24th position.

== Synopsis ==
A tough captain of the Argentine Army doggedly battles a band of outlaws composed of a mixture of Indians and Argentine deserters.

== Cast ==
- Francisco Petrone
- Luisa Vehil
- Domingo Sapelli
- Froilán Varela
- María Esther Gamas
- Judith Sulian
- Roberto Fugazot
- Margarita Corona
- Juan Bono
- María Concepción César
- Pablo Cumo
- Luis Otero
- Jorge Molina Salas
- Tito Alonso
- René Múgica
- Pedro Codina
- Aurelia Ferrer
- Francisco García Garaba
- Raúl Luar
- José Ruzzo
- Rita Montero

== Bibliography ==
- Rist, Peter H. Historical Dictionary of South American Cinema. Rowman & Littlefield, 2014.
