= Passport to Rio =

1948 film

- Directed by: Daniel Tinayre
- Written by: Daniel Tinayre; César Tiempo; Luis Saslavsky
- Produced by: Luis Saslavsky; Daniel Tinayre
- Starring: Mirtha Legrand; Arturo de Córdova; Francisco de Paula; Eduardo Cuitiño; Nathán Pinzón
- Cinematography: Antonio Merayo
- Edited by: Jorge Gárate
- Music by: Enrique Cadícamo; Juan Ehlert; Guillermo Cases
- Production company: Argentina Sono Film
- Distributed by: Argentina Sono Film
- Release date: September 29, 1948
- Running time: 100 minutes
- Country: Argentina
- Language: Spanish

Passport to Rio (Spanish: Pasaporte a Río) is a 1948 Argentine crime film of the classical era of Argentine cinema, directed by Daniel Tinayre and written by César Tiempo and Luis Saslavsky. It premiered on September 29, 1948.

== Plot ==
A thief commits a robbery but a showgirl witnesses the crime. The thief discovers this and forces her to help him take what he stole to Rio de Janeiro. With no other way out, she is shipped to Brazil by the thief. On the boat, the showgirl meets a doctor who falls in love with her while the offender is also in love with the woman.

== Cast ==
- Manuel Alcón
- Alberto Barcel
- Carlos Bellucci
- Roberto Bordoni
- Margarita Burke
- Warly Ceriani
- Eduardo Cuitiño
- Arturo de Córdova
- Francisco de Paula
- Zoe Ducós
- Rodolfo Díaz Soler
- Pilar Gómez
- Alfredo Jordan
- Mirtha Legrand
- Carmen Llambí
- Mecha López
- Pedro Maratea
- Toti Muñoz
- Fausto Padín
- Jesús Pampín
- Nathán Pinzón
- Alberto Quiles
- Domingo Sapelli
