= Sebastián Piana =

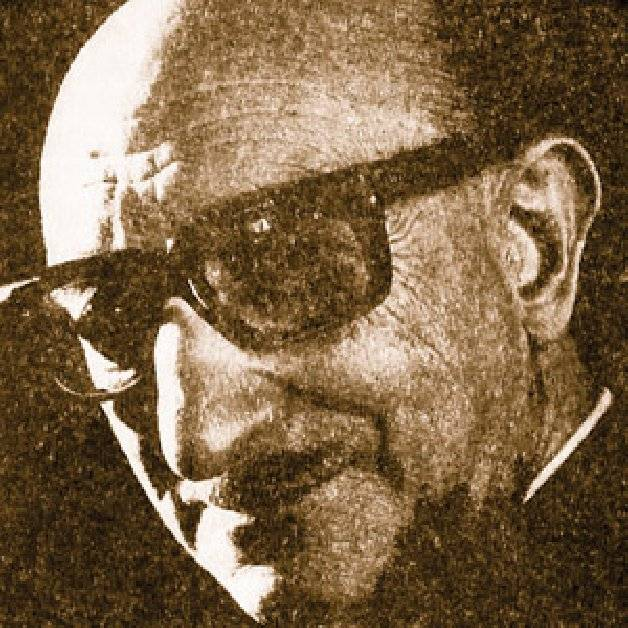
- Sebastián Piana

Background information
- Birth name: Sebastián Piana
- Born: 26 November 1903; Buenos Aires, Argentina
- Died: 17 July 1994 (aged 90); Buenos Aires, Argentina
- Genres: Tango, milonga, candombe, Milonga-candombe
- Occupation(s): Musician, pianist, conductor, composer
- Years active: 1930–1990

Sebastián Piana (26 November 1903 – 17 July 1994) was an Argentine musician, composer, orchestra conductor, and pianist, dedicated to tango music.

He was the composer of the music, among many other works, of the milongas Milonga del 900, Milonga sentimental, Milonga triste; of the tangos Viejo ciego, El pescante (with lyrics by Homero Manzi), Tinta roja (with lyrics by Cátulo Castillo), Sobre el pucho (with lyrics and musical collaboration by José González Castillo); and of the milonga-candombes Aleluya (from 1940, with lyrics by Cátulo Castillo), Pena mulata (with lyrics by Homero Manzi), among many others, and he was the creator of this genre.

And also of pure candombes and street cries from colonial Buenos Aires, with lyrics by the poet Dr. León Benarós: Cara de negro – 12 candombes y pregones de Buenos Aires (from 1790 to 1916).

He also composed the musical scores for several films such as Sombras porteñas (1936), Carnaval de antaño, He nacido en Buenos Aires, Nobleza gaucha, Las de barranco, El último payador, and Derecho viejo.

He was president of the Academia Porteña del Lunfardo.

== Life ==
=== Early years ===
He was born in Buenos Aires on November 26, 1903, in the neighborhood of Almagro, in the home of an Italian immigrant family.

His father was a barber and an amateur musician who played several instruments, such as the mandolin, guitar, and piano.

He also studied at the Odeón Music Institute with Maestro D’Agostino. He also took lessons with two important Argentine musicians: the virtuoso Ernesto Drangosch and the composer Juan Francisco Giaccobbe.

He debuted in a children’s trio when he was only 12 years old. Professionally, he made his debut at 17 years old in a neighborhood cinema, playing waltzes and opera excerpts.

=== Professional career ===
In 1922, he performed on the radio for the first time. Four years later, in 1926, he met Homero Manzi, with whom he formed a team known for writing several works in collaboration over the following years.

Around 1930, Rosita Quiroga asked Homero Manzi to write a milonga, and he in turn asked Piana to compose the music so that he could write the lyrics. It was then that he composed Milonga del 900 in just one hour.

He continued composing milongas accompanied by Manzi’s lyrics, such as Ropa blanca. Piana is also the author of Milonga de los fortines, Milonga de Juan Manuel, Milonga de Puente Alsina, and several pieces in collaboration with the poet León Benarós, such as La Milonga de Arolas. At that time, the milonga was limited to just lyrics, and Piana renewed it because, according to him, the music was fundamental.

Piana was also the author of pieces considered among the best tangos, such as Silbando, in collaboration with Cátulo Castillo on lyrics by José González Castillo in 1925; Tinta roja with lyrics by Cátulo Castillo in 1941; De barro; El pescante (lyrics by Homero Manzi, 1934); No aflojés (lyrics by Mario Battistella, music jointly with Pedro Maffia, 1934); El parque de artillería; and Son cosas del ayer, among others.

Even at 90 years old, he was still composing and teaching. He wrote around five hundred works and was president of the Academia Porteña del Lunfardo.

In 1985, he received a Diploma of Merit from the Konex Awards.

He died in Buenos Aires on July 17, 1994.

== Works ==
On the SADAIC (Argentine Society of Authors and Music Composers) website, there are 281 registered works by Sebastián Piana.

== Films ==
- He nacido en Buenos Aires (1959) dir. Francisco Mugica
- Derecho viejo (1951) dir. Manuel Romero
- Vidalita (1949) dir. Luis Saslavsky (music)
- La canción que tú cantabas (1939) dir. Miguel Mileo
- Los caranchos de la Florida (1938)
- El hombre que nació dos veces (1938)
- Una porteña optimista (1937)
