= Nedda Francy =

Argentine actress

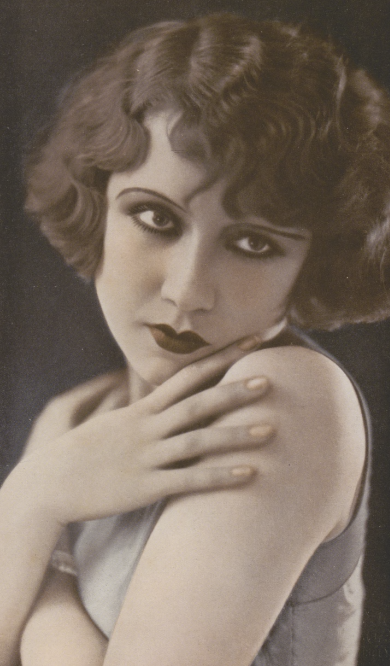
- Born: 29 November 1908; Buenos Aires, Argentina
- Died: 26 January 1982 (aged 73); Rome, Italy
- Other name: Nedda Francalanci
- Occupation: Actress
- Years active: 1928-1949 (film)

Nedda Francy (November 29, 1908 – January 26, 1982) was an Argentine stage and film actress. Working mostly in Argentina, in 1939 she appeared alongside Vittorio De Sica in the Italian comedy It Always Ends That Way. In 1948 she starred in the historical film Juan Moreira (1948).

== Filmography ==
- 1928: La borrachera del tango
- 1929; Mosaico criollo (Short)
- 1930: El drama del collar
- 1931: La despedida del unitario (Short)
- 1931: The Gold Route
- 1933: El linyera
- 1935: Monte Criollo
- 1936: Santos Vega
- 1937: Palermo
- 1937: Una porteña optimista
- 1938: Busco un marido para mi mujer
- 1939: It Always Ends That Way
- 1948: Juan Moreira
- 1949: Las aventuras de Jack

== Bibliography ==
- Goble, Alan. The Complete Index to Literary Sources in Film. Walter de Gruyter, 1999.
