= Margarita Corona =

Argentine actress (1911–1983)

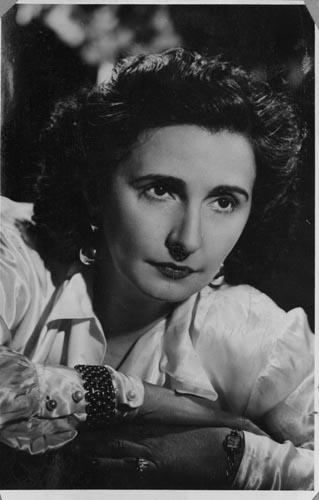
- Margarita Corona in 1960
- Born: 1911; Rio de Janeiro, Brazil
- Died: 12 October 1983 (aged 71–72); Buenos Aires, Argentina
- Occupation: Actress
- Years active: 1945-1972 (film)

Margarita Corona (1911–1983) was a Brazilian-born Argentine film actress. Corona was born in Rio de Janeiro, but moved as a small child to Argentina. After making her debut in Savage Pampas, she appeared in twenty-eight films and television episodes. She was the sister of the actor Juan Corona.

== Selected filmography ==
- Savage Pampas (1945)
- La muerte camina en la lluvia (1948)
- Suburb (1951)
- Emergency Ward (1952)
- Edad difícil (1956)
- The Romance of a Gaucho (1961)
- Caer en la tentación (1963)
- A Nation With Me (1967)

== Bibliography ==
- Cowie, Peter. World Filmography: 1967. Fairleigh Dickinson Univ Press, 1977.
