= La de los ojos color del tiempo =

- Directed by: Luis César Amadori
- Written by: Guy de Chantepleure
- Starring: Mirtha Legrand; Carlos Thompson; Zoe Ducós
- Release date: 1952
- Running time: 110 minutes
- Country: Argentina
- Language: Spanish

La De los ojos color del tiempo is a black-and-white 1952 film of the classical era of Argentine cinema directed by Luis César Amadori starring Mirtha Legrand, Carlos Thompson and Zoe Ducos. The film is based on the French writer Guy Chantepleure's 1810 novel Lil, de los ojos color del tiempo.

== Cast ==
- Mirtha Legrand
- Carlos Thompson
- Zoe Ducós
- Ricardo Galache
- Antonia Herrero
- Diana Myriam Jones
- Ángel Prío
- Pedro Aleandro
- Margarita Burke
- Enrique Chaico
- Carlos Bianquet
