= Pablo Cumo =

Argentine actor (1898–1922)

- Born: 28 July 1898; Buenos Aires, Argentina
- Died: September 7, 1992 (aged 94); Buenos Aires, Argentina
- Occupation: Actor
- Years active: 1936–1975 (film)

Pablo Cumo (28 July 1898 – 7 August 1992) was an Argentine stage and film actor. Cumo appeared in around fifty films during his career.

== Selected filmography ==
- Santos Vega (1936)
- His Best Student (1944)
- Savage Pampas (1945)
- Where Words Fail (1946)
- Juan Moreira (1948)
- My Poor Beloved Mother (1948)
- Story of a Bad Woman (1948)
- School of Champions (1950)
- The Honourable Tenant (1951)
- The Fan (1951)
- Juan Moreira (1973)

== Bibliography ==
- Etchelet, Raúl. Niní Marshall: (la biografía). La Crujía Ediciones, 2005.
