= Francis Boeniger =

- Occupation: Cinematographer
- Years active: 1934–1963 (film)

Francis Boeniger was an Argentine cinematographer. He worked on around seventy films during his career.

== Selected filmography ==
- The Soul of the Accordion (1935)
- New Port (1936)
- Three Men of the River (1943)
- The Corpse Breaks a Date (1944)
- The Prodigal Woman (1945)
- Wake Up to Life (1945)
- The Circus Cavalcade (1945)
- Lost Kisses (1945)
- Musical Romance (1947)
- From Man to Man (1949)
- The Earring (1951)
- To Live for a Moment (1951)
- The Voice of My City (1953)
- Love Never Dies (1955)

== Bibliography ==
- Jorge Finkielman. The Film Industry in Argentina: An Illustrated Cultural History. McFarland, 2003.
