= Eduardo Cuitiño (actor) =

Argentine actor

- Born: 1908; Buenos Aires, Argentina
- Died: 26 November 1963 (aged 54–55); Buenos Aires, Argentina
- Occupation: Actor
- Years active: 1941–1963 (film)

Eduardo Cuitiño (1908–1963) was an Argentine stage and film actor. He was active in the Golden Age of Argentine Cinema. He played Napoleon in the 1945 film Madame Sans-Gêne, based on the 1893 play of the same name. He was married to the actress Irma Roy.

== Selected filmography ==
- White Eagle (1941)
- Safo (1943)
- Madame Sans-Gêne (1945)
- The Naked Angel (1946)
- Passport to Rio (1948)
- La muerte camina en la lluvia (1948)
- Edición extra (1949)
- Nacha Regules (1950)
- The Marihuana Story (1950)
- The Orchid (1951)
- The Unwanted (1951)
- To Live for a Moment (1951)
- The Idol (1952)
- La pasión desnuda (1953)
- Caídos en el infierno (1954)

== Bibliography ==
- Klossner, Michael. The Europe of 1500-1815 on Film and Television: A Worldwide Filmography of Over 2550 Works, 1895 Through 2000. McFarland & Company, 2002.
- Piñeiro, Alberto Gabriel. Las calles de Buenos Aires: sus nombres desde la fundación hasta nuestros días. Instituto Histórico de la Ciudad de Buenos Aires, 2003,
