= Ulyses Petit de Murat =

Argentine poet and screenwriter

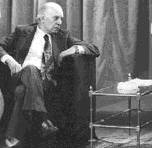
- Born: January 28, 1907; Buenos Aires, Argentina
- Died: August 19, 1983 (aged 76); Buenos Aires

Ulyses Petit de Murat (28 January 1907 – 19 August 1983) was an Argentine poet and screenwriter.

He wrote the script for The Gaucho War (1942) with Homero Manzi based on the 1905 novel by Leopoldo Lugones. At the 1943 Argentine Film Critics Association Awards, Murat and Manzi won the Silver Condor Award for Best Adapted Screenplay for their screenplay of the film which proved highly successful. His poem "Graciela Oscura" was set to music by Astor Piazzolla for the film Extraña ternura; this song was repeated several times in the movie, and was reported to be the main attraction of the film when it opened at Cine Monumental in the spring of 1964.

He was a member of the jury at the 1960 Cannes Film Festival and the 13th Moscow International Film Festival in 1983.

== Selected filmography ==
- Prisoners of the Earth (1939)
- The Gaucho War (1942)
- His Best Student (1944)
- Savage Pampas (1945)
- Where Words Fail (1946)
- The Earring (1951)
- To Live for a Moment (1951)
- Suburb (1951)
- The Orchid (1951)
- The Count of Monte Cristo (1953)
- Bluebeard (1955)
- The Romance of a Gaucho (1961)
- Savage Pampas (1966)

== Awards ==
- 1935 - Municipal Poetry Prize granting the Municipality of the City of Buenos Aires.
- 1943 - Silver Condor Award for Best Adapted Screenplay, the Film Critics Association of Argentina, shared with Homero Manzi, for The Gaucho War.
- 1962 - Argentores Prize and the National Endowment for the Arts for theater, for his work A Mirror to the Saint.
- 1967 - Argentores Trophy for Best Film by cinecomedia To Hell with This Cure.
- 1971 - Grand Prize of the National Endowment for the Arts.
- 1976 - Award "Sixto Pondal Rivers" to established authors.
- 1977 - Municipal Poetry Prize awarded by the Municipality of the City of Buenos Aires.
- 1981 - Grand Prize of Honor of the Argentina Society of Writers.
