= Dorita Ferreyro =

Argentine film actress

- Born: 31 March 1916; Buenos Aires, Argentina
- Died: 7 December 2011 (aged 95); Buenos Aires, Argentina
- Other name: Dora Ferreiro
- Occupation: Actress
- Years active: 1936-1997 (film)

Dorita Ferreyro (March 31, 1916 – December 7, 2011) was an Argentine film actress. She is also often credited as Dora Ferreiro. Ferreyro appeared in more than fifty films and television programmes during her career as well as theatre and radio work.

== Filmography ==
- 1936: Santos Vega
- 1937: Melgarejo
- 1939: Mi suegra es una fiera
- 1939: Gold in Clay
- 1939: La mujer y el jockey (Hipódromo)
- 1942: The Gaucho War
- 1948: Juan Moreira
- 1953: Las tres claves
- 1955: Para vestir santos
- 1956: Los torturados
- 1957: Alfonsina
- 1958: l festín de Satanás
- 1961: La sed
- 1967: Mujeres en presidio (TV Series, 19 episodes)
- 1967: Lo mejor de nuestra vida... nuestros hijos (TV Series, 39 episodes)
- 1968: Adorable profesor Aldao (TV Series, 29 episodes)
- 1969: Cuando vuelvas a mí (TV Series, 19 episodes)
- 1968-1970: Su comedia favorita (TV Series, 3 episodes)
- 1970: Inconquistable Viviana Hortiguera (TV Series,,29 episodes)
- 1970: Esta noche... miedo (TV Series, 2 episodes)
- 1970: El hombre que me negaron (TV Series, 19 episodes)
- 1971: Nacido para odiarte (TV Series, 39 episodes)
- 1970-1971: El teleteatro de Alberto Migré (TV Series, 3 episodes)
- 1971: Cuatro hombres para Eva (TV Series, 29 episodes)
- Un extraño en nuestras vidas (TV Series, 22 episodes)
- 1972: Mariano Marzán, un médico de Buenos Aires (TV Series, 9 episodes)
- 1972: Rolando Rivas, taxista (TV Series)
- 1973: Albina
- 1973: Teatro como en el teatro (TV Series, 2 episodes)
- 1973: Pobre diabla (TV Series, 59 episodes)
- 1973: Lo mejor de nuestra vida... nuestros hijos (TV Series, 19 episodes)
- 1973: Gorosito y señora (TV Series, 19 episodes)
- 1974: Todos nosotros (TV Series, 19 episodes)
- 1974: Mi hombre sin noche (TV Series, 19 episodes)
- 1974: Humor a la italiana (TV Series, 1 episode)
- 1974: Enséñame a quererte (TV Series, 36 episodes)
- 1974: Con odio y con amor (TV Series, 29 episodes)
- 1974: La Mary
- 1975: Tu rebelde ternura (TV Series, 74 episodes)
- 1975: Alguien por quien vivir (TV Series, 19 episodes)
- 1975: A Woman
- 1976: Los que estamos solos (TV Series, 19 episodes)
- 1976: Dos a quererse (TV Series, 19 episodes)
- 1977: Para todos (TV Series, 19 episodes)
- 1977: Pablo en nuestra piel (TV Series, 19 episodes)
- 1977: El tema es el amor (TV Series, 19 episodes)
- 1978: Vos y yo, toda la vida (TV Series, 19 episodes)
- 1979: Chau, amor mío (TV Series, 20 episodes)
- 1980: Fabián 2 Mariana (TV Series, 19 episodes)
- 1981: Quiero gritar tu nombre (TV Series, 195 episodes)
- 1981: Aprender a vivir (TV Series, 3 episodes)
- 1982: Un hombre como vos (TV Series, 19 episodes)
- 1981-1982: Teatro de humor (TV Series, 3 episodes)
- 1982: Nosotros y los miedos (TV Series, 1 episode)
- 1983: Solab (TV Series, 29 episodes)
- 1984: Tal como somos (TV Series, 125 episodes)
- 1985: Libertad condicionada (TV Series, 284 episodes)
- 1987: La cuñada (TV Series, 264 episodes)
- 1988: Vendedoras de Lafayette (TV Series, 29 episodes)
- 1990: La bonita página (TV Series, 1 episode)
- 1991: Alta comedia (TV Series)
- 1992: La elegida (TV Series, 29 episodes)
- 1994: Para toda la vida (TV Series, 19 episodes)
- 1995: Leandro Leiva, un soñador (TV Series, 20 episodes)
- 1996: Son cosas de novela (TV Series, 19 episodes)
- 1997: Rich and Famous (TV Series, 4 episodes)

== Bibliography ==
- Abel Posadas, Mónica Landro, Marta Speroni. Cine sonoro argentino: 1933-1943. El Calafate Editores, 2005.
