= José María Beltrán =

José María Beltrán Ausejo (3 June 1898 - 22 January 1962) was a prolific Spanish cinematographer who worked in Spanish, Argentine, Venezuelan and Brazilian cinema. He was involved in the cinematography of almost 80 films between 1925 and his death, and is best known for his work in Argentina in the 1940s and early 1950s.

He worked with director Francisco Múgica on a number of Argentine films including the 1942 film Adolescencia'. His photography for the 1951 film La Balandra Isabel llegó esta tarde won him significant recognition in Europe and he won best photography at the Cannes Film Festival of that year. In 1952 he worked on one of the most acclaimed films of that year Las Aguas Bajan Turbias (1952) which won the Silver Condor Award for Best Film in 1953. He died in Zaragoza.

== Selected filmography ==
- Sister San Sulpicio (1927)
- Our Lady of Sorrows (1934)
- Juan Simón's Daughter (1935)
- Paths of Faith (1938)
- The Intruder (1939)
- Isabelita (1940)
- The Englishman of the Bones (1940)
- White Eagle (1941)
- Our Natacha (1944)
- The Phantom Lady (1945)
- Savage Pampas (1945)
- Where Words Fail (1946)
