= Homero Manzi =

Argentine tango lyricist (1907–1951)

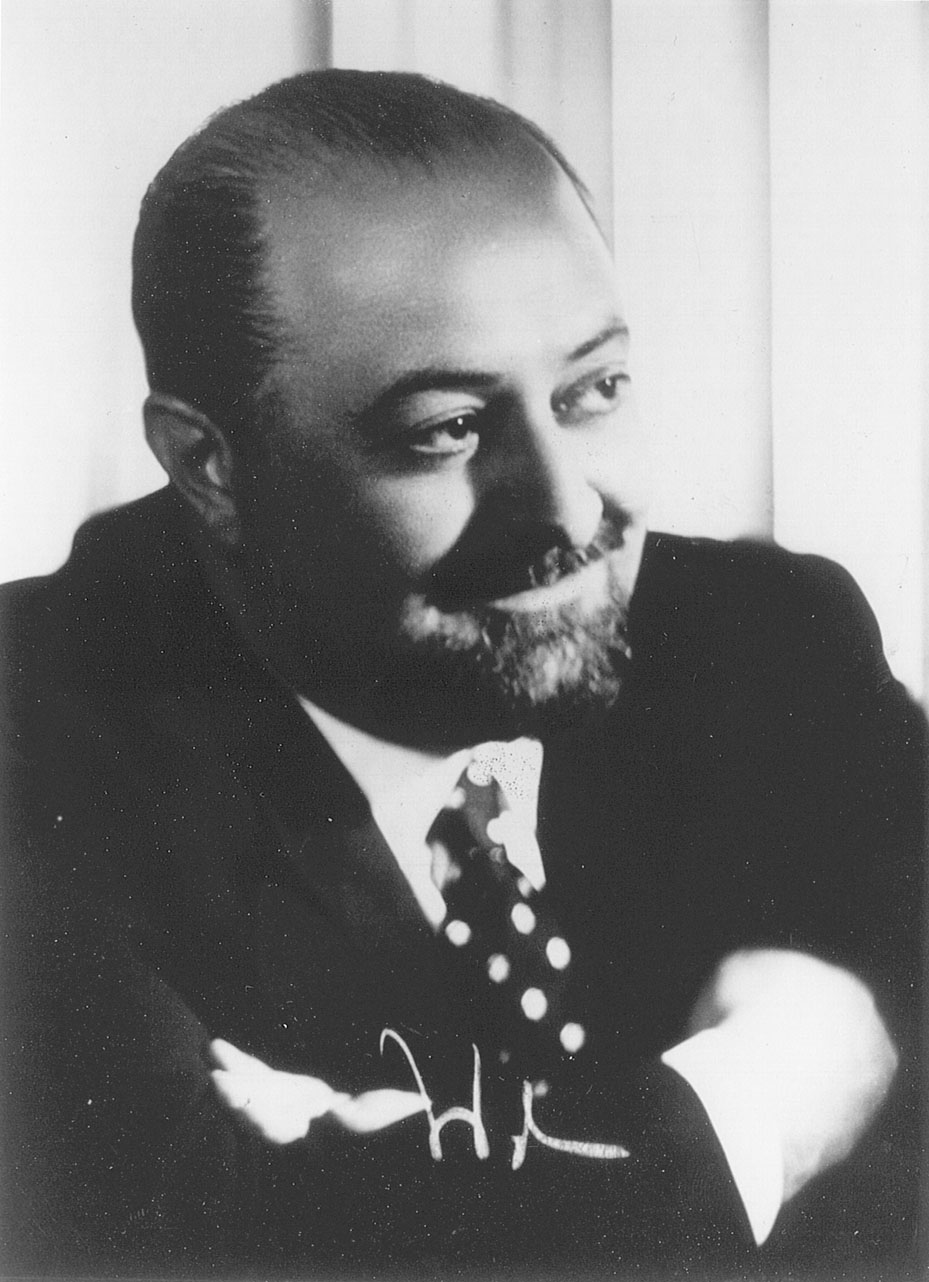
- Born: Homero Nicolás Manzione Prestera; November 1, 1907; Añatuya, Santiago del Estero, Argentina
- Died: May 3, 1951 (aged 43); Buenos Aires, Argentina
- Occupation: Tango lyricist
- Spouse: Casilda Iñíguez Vildósola
- Children: Homero Luis "Acho" Manzione
- Writing career
- Movements: Unión Cívica Radical, FORJA

Homero Nicolás Manzione Prestera, better known as Homero Manzi (November 1, 1907 – May 3, 1951) was an Argentine tango lyricist, author of various famous tangos. He was also a filmmaker, notable for his work during the classical era of Argentine cinema.

He was born on November 1 of 1907 in Añatuya (province of Santiago del Estero), Argentina. Manzi was interested in literature and tango since he was young. After a brief incursion in journalism, he worked as a literature and Spanish professor but for political reasons (in addition to his membership in the Unión Cívica Radical) he was expelled from his professorship and decided to dedicate himself to the arts.

In 1935 he participated in the beginnings of FORJA (Fuerza de Orientación Radical de la Joven Argentina – Force of Radical Orientation of the Young in Argentina), group whose position has been classified as “people's nationalism”. It was centered almost exclusively in the problems in Argentina and Latin America. They manifested to “reconquer the political Sunday from our own land” since it was considered that the country was still in a colonial situation. In relation to the European conflict at the time, it supported a neutral position sustaining that there was no great interest in play in Argentina or Latin America, it was more of a rejection position towards fascism just as much as communism.

In 1934 Manzi founded Micrófono ("Microphone") magazine which covered subjects related to radio telephony, Argentine movies and film making. He wrote the screenplay for Nobleza Gaucha in 1937 in collaboration with Hugo Mac Dougall, and a new version of the silent movie of 1915, Huella ("Footprint") (1940), for which they received second prize from Buenos Aires City Hall. He also worked in Confesión ("Confession") (1940), without achieving commercial success with any of these movies.

In 1940 Manzi started what would be a long collaboration with Ulyses Petit de Murat, writing the screenplay for Con el dedo en el gatillo ("Finger on the trigger") (1940) Fortín alto ("High Fort") (1940), and The Gaucho War (1942). At the 1943 Argentine Film Critics Association Awards, Manzi and Murat won the Silver Condor Award for Best Adapted Screenplay for their screenplay of The Gaucho War which proved highly successful.

The early death of the poet was caused by cancer on Thursday, May 3, 1951.

== Tango lyrics by Homero Manzi ==
- Arrabal Milonga
- Así Es El Tango
- Ay De Mí
- Bandoneón Amigo
- Barrio De Tango (1942), music by Aníbal Troilo.
- Betinotti (1938), music by Sebastian Piana.
- Borracho Porque Digo La Verdad
- Buenos Aires Colina Chata
- Canto De Ausencia
- Carnavalera
- Che Bandoneon (1950), music by Aníbal Troilo.
- Cornetín
- Dale Dale
- Definiciones Para Esperar Mi Muerte
- Desde El Alma (vals)
- Despues (1937), music by Hugo Gutiérrez.
- De Ayer A Hoy
- De Barro
- Discepolín (1950), music by Anibal Troilo.
- El Pescante (1934), music by Sebastian Piana.
- El Romantico Fulero
- El Último Organito (1948), music by Acho Manzi.
- Ensueño (vals)
- En Un Ranchito De Alsina - Nobleza De Arrabal
- Esquinas Porteñas (vals)
- Eufemio Pizarro
- Fruta Amarga
- Fueye
- Fuimos (1945), music by Jose Dames.
- Gato
- Gota De Lluvia (vals)
- Horizontes
- Juan Manuel
- La Mariposa Y La Flor Tango Canción
- La Pequeña Canción
- Llanto
- Llorarás, Llorarás (vals)
- Malena (1941), music by Lucio Demare.
- Mano Blanca (1939), music by Antonio de Bassi.
- Mariana Milonga
- Mañana Zarpa Un Barco (1942), music by Lucio Demare.
- Milonga Del 900
- Milonga De Los Fortines
- Milonga De Puente Alsina
- Milonga Sentimental (1932), music by Sebastian Piana.
- Milonga Triste (1937), music by Sebastian Piana.
- Milongón
- Mi Taza De Café
- Monte Criollo (1935), music by Francisco Nicolas Pracanico.
- Muchacho Del Cafetin
- Negra María (1942), music by Lucio Demare.
- Negro Lindo
- Ninguna (1942), music by Raul Fernandez Siro.
- Oro Y Plata
- Paisaje (vals)
- Papá Baltasar (1942), music by Sebastian Piana.
- Pena Mulata Milonga
- Por Qué
- Ramayón
- Recién
- Romance De Barrio (vals)
- Romántica (vals)
- Ronda De Ases
- Ropa Blanca
- Rosedal
- Se Va La Murga
- Sur (1948), music by Anibal Troilo.
- Tal Vez Será Su Voz (1943), music by Lucio Demare.
- Tango (Voz de Tango) (1942), music by Sebastian Piana.
- Tapera
- Te Lloran Mis Ojos
- Torrente
- Triste Paica
- Tu Pálida Voz
- Una Lagrima Tuya (1949), music by Mariano Mores.
- Valsecito De Antes (vals)
- Veinticuatro De Agosto
- Viejo Ciego (1926), music by Sebastian Piana and Cátulo Castillo.
- Voz De Tango
- Yo Soy Del 30

== Selected filmography ==
- The Caranchos of Florida (1938)
- His Best Student (1944)
- Savage Pampas (1945)
- Where Words Fail (1946)
- My Poor Beloved Mother (1948)
