= Enrique Muiño =

Spanish-Argentine actor

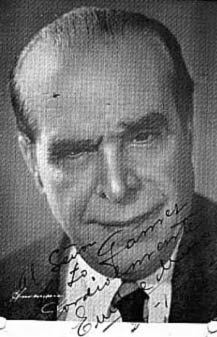
- Signed photo of Muiño, c. 1930.
- Born: July 5, 1881; A Laracha, Province of A Coruña, Galicia, Spain
- Died: May 24, 1956 (aged 74); Buenos Aires, Argentina

Enrique Muiño (July 5, 1881 – May 24, 1956) was a classic Spanish-Argentine actor who appeared in film between 1913 and his death in 1956. He is one of the greatest actors of the Golden Age of Argentine cinema.

Born in A Laracha, Spain, Muiño moved to Buenos Aires in Argentina and began a career in film. He made over 20 film appearances in Argentina and the United States, playing lead roles in films such as the 1954 film, The Grandfather with Mecha Ortiz, and Su mejor alumno (1944) for which he won the Silver Condor Award for Best Actor at the 1945 Argentine Film Critics Association Awards.

He died in Buenos Aires, Argentina, aged 74.

== Selected filmography ==
- The Gaucho Priest (1941)
- His Best Student (1944)
- Savage Pampas (1945)
- Where Words Fail (1946)
- From Man to Man (1949)
