= Associated Argentine Artists =

Argentine film distribution company

Associated Argentine Artists (Spanish: Artistas Argentinos Asociados, AAA) was a leading Argentine film distribution company. It emerged during the Golden Age of Argentine Cinema and was modeled on the Hollywood company United Artists. One of the first films released by the company following its creation was The Gaucho War (1942).

== Bibliography ==
- Rist, Peter H. Historical Dictionary of South American Cinema. Rowman & Littlefield, 2014.
