= Juan José Mantecón =

Spanish composer

Juan José Mantecón (29 July 1895 - 24 March 1964) was a Spanish composer. He was a member of Generation of '27 and the Group of Eight, the latter of which also included composers Jesús Bal y Gay, Ernesto Halffter and his brother Rodolfo, Julián Bautista, Fernando Remacha, Rosa García Ascot, Salvador Bacarisse and Gustavo Pittaluga. He composed music but was better known as a critic, writing under the name Juan del Brezo.

He was born in Vigo in Galicia to a well off family; his father, a tax official, was transferred to Oviedo and then to Madrid.
