= 1944 Argentine Film Critics Association Awards =

Argentine film awards ceremony in 1944

The 1944 Argentine Film Critics Association Awards ceremony was held in Buenos Aires on 4 April 1944 to honour the best films and contributors to Argentine cinema in 1943.

== Awards given ==
- Best Film (Mejor Película): Juvenilia
- Best Director (Mejor Director): Augusto César Vatteone for Juvenilia
- Best Actor (Mejor Actor): Francisco Petrone for Todo un hombre
- Best Actress (Mejor Actriz): Mecha Ortiz for Safo, historia de una pasión
- Best Supporting Actor (Mejor Actor de Reparto): Eloy Álvarez for Juvenilia
- Best Supporting Actress (Mejor Actriz de Reparto): Leticia Scuri for Three Men of the River (Tres hombres del río)
- Best Original Screenplay (Mejor Guión Original): Rodolfo González Pacheco, Hugo Mac Dougall, Eliseo Montaine for Three Men of the River
- Best Adapted Screenplay (Mejor Guión Adaptado): Pedro E. Pico, Manuel Agromayor, Alfredo de la Guardia for Juvenilia
- Best Cinematography (Mejor Fotografía): Francis Boeniger for Three Men of the River
- Best Sound (Mejor Sonido): Alberto López for Dollhouse (Casa de muñecas)
- Best Music (Mejor Music): Gilardo Gilardi for Three Men of the River
- Best Camera Operator (Mejor Càmara): Leo Fleider for Three Men of the River
- Best Production Design (Mejor Escenografía): Gregorio López Naguil for Stella
- Best Foreign Film (Mejor Película Extranjera): Noël Coward and David Lean's In Which We Serve (1942)
