= Julián Bautista =

Spanish composer and conductor

Julián Bautista (21 April 1901 – 8 July 1961) was a Spanish composer and conductor. He was a member of Generation of '27 and the Group of Eight, the latter of which also included composers Jesús Bal y Gay, Ernesto Halffter and his brother Rodolfo, Juan José Mantecón, Fernando Remacha, Rosa García Ascot, Salvador Bacarisse and Gustavo Pittaluga. He composed the soundtracks to 37 movies in addition to more than 30 other classical works. He worked actively as a conductor with such orchestras as the Madrid Symphony Orchestra and the Spanish National Orchestra.

Bautista was the son of Julián Bautista Swartz and Ventura Cachaza Vázquez. He began studying solfège at the age of 7 and piano at the age of 11 with Pilar Fernández de la Mora. At the age of 14 he began taking courses in harmony, counterpoint, and fugue at the Madrid Royal Conservatory where he was a pupil of Conrado del Campo.

In 1940 he emigrated to Argentina, where he lived in Buenos Aires.

== Works ==
- Sonata para Piano y Violin, 1918–20
- Cuarteto para cuerdas, 1918–20
- Canciones sobre Poesias de Bécquer, 1918–20
- Dos Impresiones Sinfónicas, 1918–20
- Interior, a lyrical drama by Maurice Maeterlinck, 1920
- La Flute de Jade, 1921
- Dos Canciones, 1921
- Juerga y Suite de Danzas, 1921
- Colores, 1921–22
- Premier Cuarteto de Cuerdas, 1922–23
- Sonatina-Trio, 1924
- Segundo Cuarteto de Cuerdas, 1926
- Tres Preludios Japoneses, 1927
- Perludio y Danza, 1928
- Suite all'Antica, 1932
- Obertura para una Opera Grotesca, 1932
- Estrambote, 1933
- Primera Sonata concertata a Quattro, 1933–34
- Sonata a Tres, 1934–36
- Concierto para Piano y Orquestra, 1934–36
- Don Perlimplin, 1934–36
- Tres Ciudades, 1937
- Camino de la Felicidad, 1937–38
- Seconda Sonata concertata a Quattro, 1938–39
- Fantasia Espanola, 1945
- Catro Poemas Galegos, 1946
- Sinfonía breve, 1956
- Romance del Rey Don Rodrigo, 1956
- Segunda Sinfonía "Ricordiana", 1957
- Tercer Cuarteto de Cuerdas, 1958

== Selected filmography ==
- An Evening of Love (1943)
- Our Natacha (1944)
- The Phantom Lady (1945)
- Back in the Seventies (1945)
- The Earring (1951)
- Suburb (1951)
- Don't Ever Open That Door (1952)
