= Silver Condor Award for Best Supporting Actor =

Annual Argentine film award

The Silver Condor Award for Best Best Supporting Actor (Spanish: Premio Cóndor de Plata a la mejor actor de reparto), given by the Argentine Film Critics Association, awards the best supporting actor in Argentina each year:

Year	Actor	Film
2022	Alfredo Castro; Carlos Portaluppi	Karnawal; El perro que no calla
2020	Luis Ziembrowski	Los sonámbulos
2019	Diego Cremonesi; Daniel Fanego	Rojo; El Ángel
2018	Claudio Rissi	La novia del desierto
2017	Lautaro Delgado	Gilda, no me arrepiento de este amor
2016	Lautaro Delgado	Kryptonita
2015	Oscar Martínez	Relatos salvajes
2014	Guillermo Pfening	Wakolda
2013	Daniel Fanego	Todos tenemos un plan
2012	Claudio Rissi	Aballay, el hombre sin miedo
2011	Luciano Cáceres; Willy Lemos	La mosca en la ceniza Paco
2010	Guillermo Francella	El secreto de sus ojos
2009	Gabriel Goity	Un novio para mi mujer
2008	Diego Peretti	La señal
2007	Arturo Goetz	Derecho de familia
2006	Hugo Arana	Cautiva
2005	Daniel Fanego	Luna de Avellaneda
2004	Gustavo Garzón	El fondo del mar
2003	Enrique Liporace	Bolivia
2002	Eduardo Blanco	El hijo de la novia
2001	Claudio Rissi	76 89 03
2000	Eduardo Blanco	El mismo amor, la misma lluvia
1999	Gabriel Goity	Secretos compartidos
1998	Eusebio Poncela	Martín (hache)
1997	Juan Leyrado	Despabílate amor
1996	Tincho Zabala	No te mueras sin decirme adónde vas
1995	Pepe Soriano	Una sombra ya pronto serás
1994	Enrique Pinti	Perdido por perdido
1993	José Sacristán	Un lugar en el mundo
1992	Patricio Contreras	Después de la tormenta
1991	Pablo Britcha	Últimas imágenes del naufragio
1990	Alberto Segado	Nunca estuve en Viena
1986	Patricio Contreras	La historia oficial
1983	Ulises Dumont	Últimos días de la víctima
1982	Ulises Dumont	Tiempo de revancha
1981	Oscar Espíndola	El infierno tan temido
1974	Sergio Renán	Los siete locos
1973	Héctor Alterio	La maffia
1971	Carlos Carella	Los herederos
1970	Juan Carlos Gené	Don Segundo Sombra; La fiaca Tiro de gracia
1968	Juan Carlos Altavista; Edgardo Suárez	Las pirañas El romance del Aniceto y la Francisca
1967	Miguel Ligero	Castigo al traidor El ojo que espía
1966	Dringue Farías	La pérgola de las flores
1964	Orestes Caviglia	Paula cautiva
1963	Jorge Rivera López	Los jóvenes viejos
1962	Jacinto Herrera	Hijo de hombre
1961	Lautaro Murúa	Fin de fiesta
1960	Alfredo Alcón; Duilio Marzio	El candidato
1959	Walter Vidarte	Procesado 1040
1956	Lautaro Murúa	Confesiones al amanecer
1955	Carlos Rivas	Barrio gris
1954	Nathán Pinzón	El vampiro negro
1953	Pedro Laxalt	Las aguas bajan turbias
1952	Santiago Gómez Cou	La orquídea
1951	Carlos Perelli	Surcos de sangre
1950	Alberto Closas	Danza del fuego
1949	Enrique Chaico	Dios se lo pague
1946	Froilán Varela	Pampa bárbara
1945	Sebastián Chiola	El muerto falta a la cita
1944	Eloy Álvarez	Juvenilia
