= Jesús Bal y Gay =

Spanish composer, music critic and musicologist

- Born: June 23, 1905
- Died: March 3, 1993 (aged 87); Torrelaguna
- Occupations: composer, music critic, and musicologis

Jesús Bal y Gay (23 June 1905 – 3 March 1993) was a Spanish composer, music critic, and musicologist. He was a member of Generation of '27 and the Group of Eight, the latter of which also included composers Julián Bautista, Ernesto Halffter and his brother Rodolfo, Juan José Mantecón, Fernando Remacha, Rosa García Ascot, Salvador Bacarisse and Gustavo Pittaluga. He married Ascot in 1933.

== Career ==
Jesús Bal y Gay was born in Lugo, where he began his musical studies. There he established contact with the group from the magazine Ronsel in whose publication he published Hacia el ballet gallego (Towards the Galician ballet) (1924), an effort which represented his launch into professional literary life.

With the collaboration of Eduardo Martinez Torner, he embarked on a project that would see him taking many trips and much time, the Galician Songbook, which would not be completed until 1974. It was his most famous and celebrated work.

He moved to Santiago de Compostela to study medicine, but he left everything to go to Madrid, where, in 1924, he joined the Residencia de Estudiantes. He died in Torrelaguna.
