= Fernando Remacha =

Spanish composer

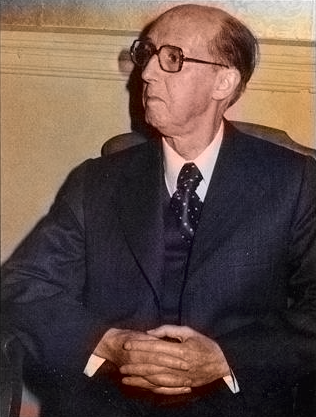
Fernando Remacha

Fernando Remacha Villar (15 December 1898 – 21 February 1984) was a Spanish composer, part of the Group of Eight which formed a sub-set of the Generation of '27.

== Early years ==
Remacha was born in Tudela, Navarre on 15 December 1898. At the age of nine he began to study the violin with the choirmaster of Tudela Cathedral, Joaquin Castellano. In 1911, Remacha travelled to Madrid for the purpose of studying to become a chartered accountant, but at the same time he continued his music studies. He took courses at the Madrid Conservatory where he passed at one time the first three courses of solfeggio, and had private violin classes with Jose del Hierro. Remacha lived in the home of his aunt, Isabel Soriano, who encouraged him to study harmony once he had completed the violin courses. That was how he began his instruction under Conrado del Campo, in whose classes he met Salvador Bacarisse and Julian Bautista, the people who formed the initial core of the Grupo de Madrid together with Remacha.

During his period as a student in Madrid, Remacha also played in the Orquesta de Revista y Zarzuela, which performed at the Teatro Apolo and provided him with a wage of twelve pesetas a day.

His first works, some of which already revealed a great talent, date from those times: the ballet "La Maja Vestida" ("The Clothed Maja") (1919), the symphonic poem "Alba" ("Dawn") (1922) and "Tres Piezas para Piano" ("Three Pieces for Piano") (1923). 1923 was also the year in which Remacha finished his composition studies under Conrado del Campo, and entered and won the Premio de Roma (Rome Prize) with a cantata and a motet for choir and orchestra, and an instrumental fugue. The grant obtained in the prize contest allowed him to travel to Rome, where he studied under Gian Francesco Malipiero, deepening his knowledge of Monteverdi and Vivaldi. In this way he gained a thorough acquaintance with the resources of the old masters, resources which he later put to use in his works through a modern idiom.

The Premio de Roma awarded to Remacha by the Royal Academy of Fine Arts of San Fernando meant four years of studies with lodging at the Accademia di San Pietro in Montorio, at that time under the direction of the painter Eduardo Chicharro. The financial situation of the Accademia at the time of Remacha's arrival in September 1923 was precarious, but the grant was maintained. At the Accademia di Roma, Remacha lived with other grant winners who were among the artistic and intellectual promises of the Spain of those years. These people included Fernando Garcia Mercadal, an architect who, years later, was to construct the present-day building of the Pablo Sarasate Conservatory of Pamplona, the painter Pablo Pascual, and the draughtsman Emilio Moya.

From the musical standpoint, the grant required that the winners prepare a set of annual works that were evaluated by a jury in Madrid. From this period date such pieces as the motet for choir and orchestra "Quam Pulchri Sunt" (1925), the "Sinfonia a tres Tiempos" ("Symphony in Three Tempos") (1925) or the "Homenaje a Gongora" ("Homage to Gongora") (1927), the latter a work in which Remacha showed his identification with the ideas of the Generation of '27.

Remacha completed his Roman period in 1927. In 1928 he took part in the competition for a position as violist in the Symphonic Orchestra of Arbos, winning first place. He supplemented his work as a musician in the small orchestra of Union Radio, in which he played the viola together with his former teacher and friend Conrado del Campo.

Bacarisse placed him in contact with Ricardo Urgoiti, who in 1929 had founded the firm Filmofono, a cinema production company that achieved enormous success with films of a commercial bent. Remacha's work at Filmofono evolved from the mere synchronisation of records (in the silent-film period) to tasks as the genuine manager and technical expert in musical affairs. He also composed incidental music for four Spanish films produced by Filmofono in the talking-film period: Don Quintin el amargao (Mr Quentin the Sourpuss) (1935). La hija de Juan Simon (Juan Simon's Daughter) (1935), ¿Quien me quiere a mi? (Who Loves Me?) (1936) and Centinela alerta (Sentinel Alert) (1936). This was precisely the work that brought him into contact with Luis Buñuel, who acted as producer and in some cases, as in Centinela alerta, as director. Remacha's cinema activity was also linked to the firm Cinematiraje Riera, engaged in copying films, which called on Remacha's services and knowledge in 1932.

In a record shop of Urgoiti's company in Avenida Pi y Margall of Madrid Remacha met Rafaela Gonzalez, whom he married on 7 October 1932.

1930 was an important year in Remacha's career as a composer since it marked the presentation of the Grupo de Madrid, formed with Salvador Bacarisse, Julian Bautista, Gustavo Pittaluga, Juan José Mantecón, Rosa García Ascot, and the brothers Rodolfo and Ernesto Halffter. The works of these composers began to be appreciated in the period marked by the advent of the Spanish Republic. Remacha received his first Premio Nacional de Música (National Music Prize) in 1933 for his "Quartet for Violin, Viola, Cello and Piano". In 1938, in the midst of the Spanish Civil War, he received his second Premio Nacional de Música for the "String Quartet", composed in 1924 as a required piece under his Italian grant. The end of the Civil War found Remacha and his wife in Barcelona, and from there they took refuge across the French border. Separated from his family, Remacha did not feel up to remaining in the refugee camps that had been hastily set up by the French government, and in the security of his not having held a political office and not having been in the army, he decided to depart for Tudela.

== Later years ==
Those years in Tudela marked Remacha's future personality. Little is known of his character before the outbreak of the Spanish Civil War and very few testimonies are available. However, there are the impressions of several people who knew Remacha after the War, either during the years he lived in Tudela or once he had settled in Pamplona. All these people concur in that Fernando Remacha was a modest, unassuming person. In Tudela Remacha took charge of the family hardware shop, which still exists. From a strictly intellectual standpoint the course of Remacha's life was one of the bitterest of those of all the musicians of the Grupo de Madrid. Accordingly, it may be said that his was one of the most arduous exiles following the War. Condemned to a brutal cultural silence, Remacha had to begin again from zero, that is, he had to start all over again, assimilating his circumstances as best he could.

With "Cartel de Fiestas" ("Festival Poster") (1947), a work that won a contest for topical and regionalist themes, he introduced himself in Pamplona, capital of Navarre. In 1951 the Pamplona City Council commissioned him to compose "Visperas de San Fermin" ("On the Eve of San Fermin") and, with the opening performance of this work in Madrid in 1952, Remacha succeeded in being noticed again by the Spanish music critics. From that moment on his production was musically variable, with the composition of such dissimilar works as "Concerto for Guitar and Orchestra" (1956) or "Rapsodia de Estella" ("Rhapsody of Estella") (1958).

In 1957 Remacha moved to Pamplona to start up the Pablo Sarasate Conservatory. In 1963 the present-day building of that institution was erected and, under Remacha's direction, it became a point of reference in the Spanish music world. Also in 1963 he composed the cantata "Jesucristo en la Cruz" ("Christ on the Cross"), which earned him the Tormo de Oro Prize of the Cuenca Religious Week, pleasantly surprising the music critics with the concept of this work. Remacha had been suffering from a devastating illness, Parkinson's disease, since the sixties. When he retired in 1975 he was already quick sick. In 1980 he received the Premio Nacional de Música for the third time, and in 1981 the Pablo Iglesias Prize. For its part, the Institucion Principe de Viana organised the Remacha Memorial, holding three concerts to promote acquaintance with some of the composer's works. Indeed, in the last years of Remacha's life it appeared that the musical circles wished to compensate him for the silence in which he had been enveloped in the post-war period.

In the last period of his life he was always open to the musical avant-garde, even though he did not generally share its criteria. This attitude aroused the admiration and respect of the most representative Spanish avant-garde composers of the times, a position that Remacha did not find comfortable because of his characteristic modesty and scant selfesteem.

Fernando Remacha died on 21 February 1984. In Tudela, a solemn funeral was held for the composer prior to his burial there, and the official days of mourning were 21 and 22 February.

== Music ==
Thus, the life of Fernando Remacha is the story of a composer conditioned by circumstances that limited his musical career. The Spanish Civil War cut off his musical evolution and his presence in the musical life of Spain. Following the war Remacha suffered an "interior exile" which, together with Spain's isolation, produced a step backwards in the aesthetics of some of his works. Remacha's activity from 1957 as the director of the Pablo Sarasate Conservatory halted his work as a composer since he devoted himself almost entirely to teaching. Additionally, the advance of his Parkinson's disease caused him to compose very little music in the seventies.

Within this context, Remacha's return to music took place through teaching and the composition of music for piano and for the Navarrese choirs with which he came into contact. In this way musical genres that Remacha had hardly dealt with prior to the war came to acquire considerable importance, since these were the works that could have the most immediate impact. Some of his piano works were based on a Bachian conception of music. This was the case with the "Prelude and Fugue in D minor" (1945), dedicated to Ricardo Urgoiti. Certain anecdotal circumstances explain the idiom used in some of Remacha's works. For example, the "Piano Sonatina" (1945) is a more peaceful work because it was intended to be performed by Urgoiti's daughter. At the same time, as a result of the contests in which Remacha took part and the commissions that were made to him, a regionalist component arose in his work which added nothing new to his compositions. Despite this, in all his compositions Remacha tried to assimilate this regionalism with his own traits. This may be observed in such works as "Cartel de Fiestas" ("Festival Poster") (1946) or "Rapsodia de Estella" ("Rhapsody of Estella") (1958), which are by no means among the best pieces composed by Remacha. Aside from this Remacha composed a large quantity of choral music which may be divided between original compositions and harmonisations or adaptations.

In the works that were composed without conditioning of any type, Remacha maintained links with the pre-war period, developing at the same time a very particular expressionistic vision. Among the imbalances and ellipses that exist in his work, we find a common denominator that is none other than musical expressiveness. In short, his music presents an evident emotional charge, but always with a personal style that arises from the composer's deep reflection and not from emotional spontaneity. His music does not reflect the personality of a highly imaginative composer but, paradoxically enough, it does show an original personal style in the way of dealing with the elements or the lines inspired by other composer. The circumstances and the haste that marked his composition is reflected in his short catalogue of pieces, to which Remacha himself referred on receiving his Third National Music Prize in 1980: "For reasons beyond my control, I am a musician without music. For years I could hardly compose anything at all and later, on devoting myself to the Conservatory, I found myself in the same situation". The carelessness and abandon he showed for his scores and the scant importance he attributed to them was also reflected in disillusionment that Remacha felt for composition in the last years of his life.
