= Centauros del pasado =

- Directed by: Belisario García Villar
- Screenplay by: Belisario García Villar; Eliseo Montaine; Roberto Talice
- Based on: Centauros del pasado (historical novel) by Eliseo Montaine and Roberto Talice
- Produced by: Juan Botsa
- Starring: Nelo Cosimi; Santiago Gómez Cou; Pedro Maratea; Alita Román; Domingo Sapelli; Froilán Varela; Ernesto Vilches; Eloy Álvarez
- Cinematography: Hugo Chiesa; Julio C. Lavera; Antonio Merayo; Fulvio Testi
- Music by: Alejandro Gutiérrez del Barrio
- Release date: April 13, 1944 (Argentina)
- Running time: 110 minutes
- Country: Argentina
- Language: Spanish

Centauros del pasado is a 1944 Argentine historical biopic of the classical era of Argentine cinema, directed by Belisario García Villar, with a screenplay by Villar, Eliseo Montaine, and Roberto Talice, as based upon the original historical novel by Montaine and Talice about Pancho Ramirez, a governor of Argentina's Entre Ríos Province during the Argentine War of Independence, and founder of the Republic of Entre Ríos.

== Plot ==
During the Argentine War of Independence, Pancho Ramirez led well-disciplined and successful forces against the Royalists, eventually founding the short-lived Republic of Entre Ríos in 1820. When opposition forces captured his wife in 1821, Ramirez was killed and beheaded during an ill-fated attempt at rescue.

== Cast ==
- Nelo Cosimi
- Santiago Gómez Cou
- Pedro Maratea
- Alita Román
- Domingo Sapelli
- Froilán Varela
- Ernesto Vilches
- Eloy Álvarez
- Lalo Bouhier
- José De Ángelis
- Francisco Pablo Donadío
- Nelly Edison
- César Fiaschi
- Anita Jordán
- Francisco López Silva
- Raúl Merlo
- Pepito Petray
- Juan Pérez Bilbao
- Elvira Quiroga
- Marino Seré
- Félix Tortorelli

== Accolades ==
In 1945, The Argentine Film Critics Association awarded Roberto Talice and Eliseo Montaine the Silver Condor Award for Best Original Screenplay.
