= Three Men of the River =

- Directed by: Mario Soffici
- Written by: Rodolfo González Pacheco, Hugo Mac Dougall, Eliseo Montaine
- Produced by: Luis Giudici
- Cinematography: Francis Boeniger
- Edited by: Carlos Rinaldi
- Music by: Gilardo Gilardi
- Production company: San Miguel Films
- Release date: April 22, 1943 (Buenos Aires)
- Running time: 93 minutes
- Country: Argentina
- Language: Spanish

Three Men of the River (Spanish: Tres hombres del río) is a 1943 Argentine crime drama film of the classical era of Argentine cinema, directed by Mario Soffici and starring Elisa Galvé and José Olarra. The film is based on an old Argentine legend about an Aztec girl who is raped and murdered by vandals and dumped in a river. A flower blossoms at the place in which she was killed and misfortune falls upon the culprits.

Three Men of the River was one of the most critically acclaimed films of 1943 in Argentina, winning five Silver Condor awards at the 1944 Argentine Film Critics Association Awards, with cinematographers Leo Fleider and Francis Boeniger winning the Silver Condor Awards for Best Camera Operator and Best Cinematography respectively, and Leticia Scuri winning the Silver Condor Award for Best Supporting Actress. The film also won Best Original Screenplay and Best Music. At the Argentine Academy of Cinematography Arts and Sciences awards it also won Best Director for Soffici, Best Original Screenplay, Best Supporting Actress for Scuri, and Best Cinematography and Best Camera Operator for Boeniger and Fleider.

== Cast ==
- Elisa Galvé
- José Olarra
- Agustín Irusta
- Luis Aldás
- Leticia Scuri
- Juan José Míguez
- Homero Cárpena
- Lucy Blanco
- Roberto Ferradás
- Luis Tortorelli
