= Rosa García Ascot =

Spanish composer and pianist

Rosa García Ascot (8 April 1902 in Madrid – 2 May 2002 in Torrelaguna, Madrid) was a Spanish composer and pianist. She was the only woman in the famed Group of Eight, whose members also included Julián Bautista, Ernesto Halffter and his brother Rodolfo, Juan José Mantecón, Fernando Remacha, Salvador Bacarisse and Jesús Bal y Gay. She married Bal y Gay in 1933. Her more notable compositions include Suite para orquesta (Suite for orchestra), Preludio (Prelude), and the Concierto para piano y orquesta (Concerto for piano and orchestra).

García Ascot was an exponent of Manuel de Falla's music as a concert pianist and is also considered the latter's last disciple. Before studying with de Falla in Madrid, she was a pupil of Felipe Pedrell, and later studied with Enrique Granados. She spent 10 years in the early part of her career actively touring as a concert soloist and recitalist. Afterwards, her public concerts were relatively few and always in very special circumstances. She died almost a month after her 100th birthday.
