= Fugazot =

Fugazot is a surname. Notable people with the surname include:

- María Rosa Fugazot (1942–2026), Argentine actress
- Roberto Fugazot (1902–1971), Uruguayan tango singer and actor
