= Claudio Rissi =

Argentine actor and stage director (1956–2024)

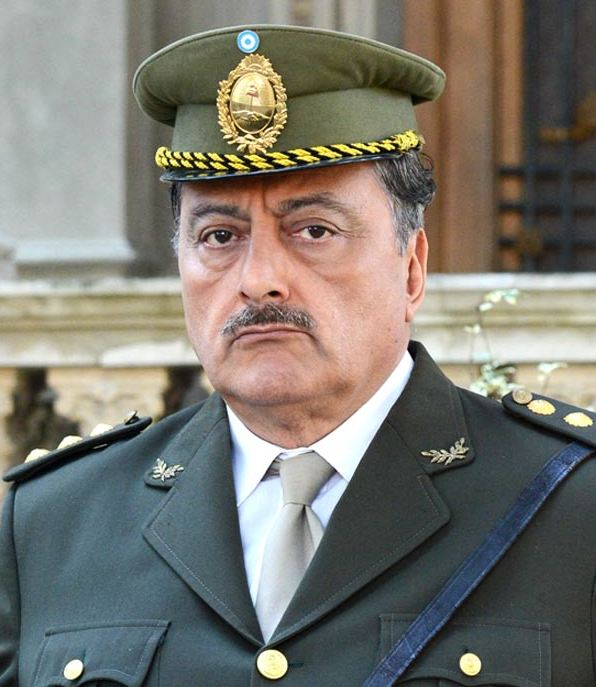
- Rissi in 2015
- Born: 22 May 1956; Boedo, Buenos Aires, Argentina
- Died: 2 February 2024 (aged 67); Palermo, Buenos Aires, Argentina
- Occupations: Actor, stage director

Claudio Rissi (22 May 1956 – 2 February 2024) was an Argentine actor and stage director.

Rissi worked for the Teatro Argentina for most of his career. He died of cancer in the Palermo neighborhood of Buenos Aires, on 2 February 2024, at the age of 67.

== Filmography ==
- Chorros (1987)
- The Girlfriend (1988)
- Rompecorazones (1992)
- Hostage (1994)
- Comix, cuentos de amor, de video y de muerte (1995)
- Historias Breves I: Guarisove, los olvidados (1995)
- Canción desesperada (1997)
- Mob Cops (1997)
- The Revenge (1999)
- 76 89 03 (2000)
- Burnt Money (2000)
- Nine Queens (2000)
- Rosarigasinos (2001)
- Common Ground (2002)
- Bottom of the Sea (2003)
- Goodbye Dear Moon (2004)
- Próxima Salida (2004)
- Erreway: 4 caminos (2004)
- Palermo Hollywood (2005)
- The Aura (2005)
- City in Heat (2007)
- Fierro (2007)
- Paco (2009)
- Black Buenos Aires (2009)
- Aballay (2010)
- La Patria Equivocada (2011)
- Juan y Eva (2011)
- Cruzadas (2011)
- Tiger, Blood in the Mouth (2016)
- The Desert Bride (2017)
- Bruno Motoneta (2018)
- La sombra del gallo (2020)
- El Marginal (2016)

== Awards ==
- Silver Condor Award for Best Supporting Actor in The Desert Bride (2018)
