= Hugo Mac Dougall =

Argentine writer, screenwriter, and journalist

Hugo Mac Dougall, born Hugo Mascías (9 December 1901 – 15 May 1976 in Buenos Aires) was an Argentine writer, screenwriter, and journalist. At the 1943 Argentine Film Critics Association Awards, Mac Dougall won the Silver Condor Award for Best Original Screenplay for his work Malambo (1942). He won it again the following year for his script co-written with Rodolfo González Pacheco and Eliseo Montaine for Three Men of the River (Tres hombres del río)(1943).

== Biography ==
His maternal grandfather was Hugh Mac Dougall, a Scottish man who emigrated to Argentina. He settled in the province of Entre Ríos, where he owned several estancias. One of his daughters was Margarita Mac Dougall. She married José María Mascías, a Catalan immigrant born in Reus, Tarragona on April 17, 1864 and from this marriage was born Hugo Mascías Mac Dougall.

== Filmography ==
- Interpol llamando a Río (1962)
- Favela (1961)
- Caballito criollo (1953)
- El tambor de Tacuarí (1948)
- Juan Moreira (1948)
- Viaje sin regreso (1946)
- Lauracha (1946) from the novel of the same name by Otto Miguel Cione
- The Three Musketeers (1946)
- Villa Rica del Espíritu Santo (1945)
- El fin de la noche (1944)
- Tres hombres del río (1943)
- Malambo (1942)
- Ceniza al viento (1942)
- The Gaucho Priest (1941)
- Confesión (1940)
- Huella (1940)
- Nobleza gaucha (1937)
- Santos Vega (1936)
