= Adolfo Salazar =

Spanish music critic

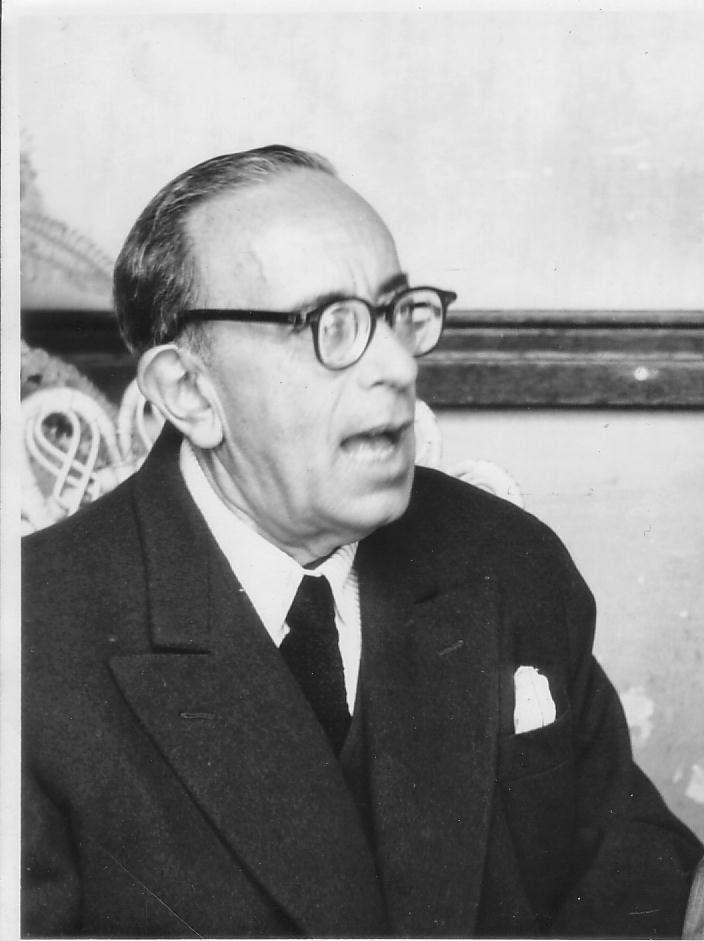
Adolfo Salazar

Adolfo Salazar Ruiz de Palacios (6 March 1890 – 27 September 1958) was a Spanish music historian, music critic, composer, and diplomat of the first half of the twentieth century. He was the preeminent Spanish musicologist of the Silver Age. Fluent in Spanish, French, and English, he was an intellectual and expert of the artistic and cultural currents of his time, and a brilliant polemicist. He maintained a close connection with other prominent Spanish intellectuals and musicians including José Ortega y Gasset, Jesús Bal y Gay, and Ernesto Halffter. In his writings, he was a defender of the French musical aesthetic of Maurice Ravel and Claude Debussy.

He composed over twenty works for orchestra, string quartet, solo piano, voice and piano, chorus, and guitar. While his compositions are significant in the context of the 1920s Spanish musical avant-garde, today his critical writings are deemed of greater importance. He is most known for his insightful commentary and analysis in his eighteen years as music critic (1918-1936) for the Madrid daily El Sol.

== Biography ==
Salazar was born in Madrid. He attended Madrid University, first studying history but then switching to music. He was co-director of the Revista Musical Hispano-Americana (1914-1918) with Rogelio Villar. He studied composition with Bartolomé Pérez Casas, and is said to have studied with Maurice Ravel, though little documentary evidence exists. In 1915, along with Manuel de Falla and M. Salvador y Carreras, he founded the Sociedad Nacional de Música, serving as secretary until 1922. In the late 1920s, he turned his attention from composing to devote himself to music criticism. In his columns for El Sol between 1918 and 1936, he both reviews concerts and discusses trends in the Spanish public's reception of classical music. His activities as critic and historian intermingle, though the second became more important over the years and is a consequence of the first. Salazar corresponded with many of the leading intellectuals and composers of his time, including José Ortega y Gasset, as well as members of the Grupo de los Ocho including Jesús Bay y Gay, Ernesto and Rodolfo Halffter, and Salvador Barcarisse. In 1932, he attended the International Congress of Arab Music in Egypt.

In 1937, Salazar went to Paris to carry out a propaganda mission on behalf of the Republican government. In 1938, he was named cultural attaché for the Spanish Embassy in Washington, D.C. While in the United States, he organized courses in folklore at the University of Middlebury in the company of Joaquín Nin-Culmell. In 1939, he moved to Mexico at the invitation of Mexican president Lázaro Cárdenas del Río, and continued to write essays and monographs on European music. From 1939, he taught at the Colegio de México, and from 1946 at the Mexico National Conservatory. In 1947, he gave a lecture series at Harvard University titled "Music in Cervantes," and two years later was awarded a Guggenheim fellowship. He died in Mexico City in 1958.

== Musical style ==
Salazar's earliest works ("Estampes," "Jaculatoria") have Spanish-style nationalism. His style evolved in the mid-1910s toward Impressionistic techniques: parallel chords, lack of clear cadences, and avoidance of major or minor modes. His most successful works are the two for string quartet, Rubaiyat and Arabia. Written correspondence shows that Manuel de Falla gave guidance to Salazar in the composition of Rubaiyat. His last composition, Cuatro letrillas de Cervantes, is more strictly tonal and closer to folksong than his early works, with clear patterns and two-measure phrases.

== Compositions ==
1913 - Melancolie (Goethe), voice and piano

1915 - Tres poemas de Rosalía de Castro, voice and piano

1916 - Tres preludios, for piano

1917 - Quartet in G minor - Schumaniana, for piano

1920 - Trois chansons de Paul Verlaine, voice and piano

1923 - Arabia, orchestra

1924 - String quartet no. 3 in B minor - Rubaiyat, string quartet

1925 - Trois petites pièces, chamber

1927 - Zarabanda, chamber - Romancillo, guitar - Deux enfantines, guitar

1929 - Paisajes, orchestra

1934 - Homenaje a Arbós, orchestra

1948 - Cuatro letrillas de Cervantes, chorus

Source: Emilio Casares Rodicio

== Written works ==
- Andrómeda. Critical essays (1921)

- Música y músicos de hoy (1928)

- Sinfonía y ballet. Idea y gesto en música y danzas contemporáneas (1929)

- La música contemporánea en España (1930)

- La música actual en Europa y sus problemas (1935)

- El siglo romántico (1936, 2nd ed. 1955)

- La música en el siglo XX (1936)

- Música y sociedad en el siglo XX (1939)

- La rosa de los vientos en la música europea (1940)

- Las grandes estructuras de la música (1941)

- Introducción a la música actual (1942)

- La música moderna (1944)

- Music in Our Time (1946)

- La danza y el ballet (1950)

- La música de España (1953)
