= Eliseo Montaine =

Argentine writer and painter (1906–1966)

Eliseo Montaine (1 August 1906 – 1966) was an Argentine writer, dramatist, screenwriter, humorist and painter. He was the writer of Pampa florida and El viaje. In the late 1940s and early 1950 he frequently collaborated in his books with Roberto Tálice. At the 1944 Argentine Film Critics Association Awards he won the Silver Condor Award for Best Original Screenplay with Rodolfo González Pacheco, and Hugo Mac Dougall for Three Men of the River (Tres hombres del río). The following year he won the same award for Centauros del pasado.
