= Stella (1943 film) =

- Directed by: Benito Perojo
- Written by: César Duáyen (novel), Benito Perojo, Ulises Petit de Murat, Pedro E. Pico
- Cinematography: Pablo Tabernero, Enrique Wallfisch
- Edited by: Kurt Land
- Music by: Paul Misraki
- Production company: Pampa Film
- Distributed by: Empa Film
- Release date: October 8, 1943 (Buenos Aires)
- Running time: 92 minutes
- Country: Argentina
- Language: Spanish

Stella is a 1943 Argentine romantic drama film of the classical era of Argentine cinema directed by Benito Perojo and starring Zully Moreno, Florindo Ferrario and Guillermo Battaglia. At the 1944 Argentine Film Critics Association Awards, Gregorio López Naguil won the Silver Condor award for Best Production Design.

== Cast ==
- Zully Moreno
- Florindo Ferrario
- Stella Río
- Rafael Frontaura
- Guillermo Battaglia
- Fernando Lamas
- María Santos
- Mary Parets
- Chela Cordero
- Carlos Lagrotta
