= Ricardo Passano =

Argentinian actor

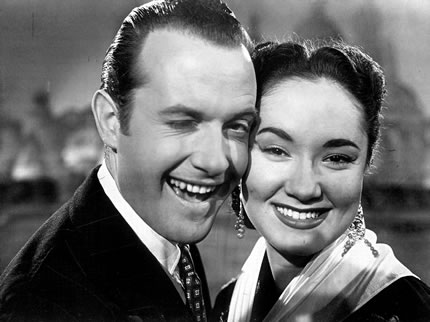
Passano and Lolita Torres in Rhythm, Salt and Pepper (1951)

Ricardo Passano (April 19, 1922 in Caballito, Buenos Aires – December 13, 2012 in Ituzaingo) was an Argentine actor. He starred in the acclaimed Silver Condor-winning 1943 film Juvenilia. Other notable roles include Cuando en el cielo pasen lista (1945) and El mal amor (1955).

== Selected filmography ==
- The Abyss Opens (1945)
- The Three Rats (1946)
- Rhythm, Salt and Pepper (1951)
