= El Capitán Pérez =

1946 film

- Directed by: Enrique Cahen Salaberry
- Written by: Mauricio Rosenthal; Pedro E. Pico
- Produced by: Sur
- Starring: Olinda Bozán; José Olarra; Alberto Bello; Francisco de Paula; Fanny Navarro
- Edited by: José Cañizares
- Music by: Alejandro Gutiérrez del Barrio
- Release date: 7 February 1946
- Running time: 70 minutes
- Country: Argentina
- Language: Spanish

El Capitán Pérez (English: Captain Pérez) is a 1946 Argentine film of the classical era of Argentine cinema, directed by Enrique Cahen Salaberry and written by Mauricio Rosenthal and Pedro E. Pico, based upon the short story of Carlos Octavio Bunge. It premiered on February 7, 1946.

== Cast ==
- Olinda Bozán
- José Olarra
- Alberto Bello
- Francisco de Paula
- Fanny Navarro
- Benita Puértolas
- Patricio Azcárate
- Federico Mansilla
- Darío Cossier
- Carlos Belluci
- Domingo Mania
- Miguel Coiro
