= Mario Medrano =

Argentine actor

Mario Medrano was an Argentine actor. He starred in the acclaimed Silver Condor-winning 1943 film Juvenilia. Other notable roles include in Ragged Football (1948), ...Y mañana serán hombres (1939) and Back in the Seventies (1945).

== Selected filmography ==
- Our Natacha (1944)
- Back in the Seventies (1945)
- Ragged Football (1948)
