= La Antorcha =

Argentinian newspaper (1921–1932)

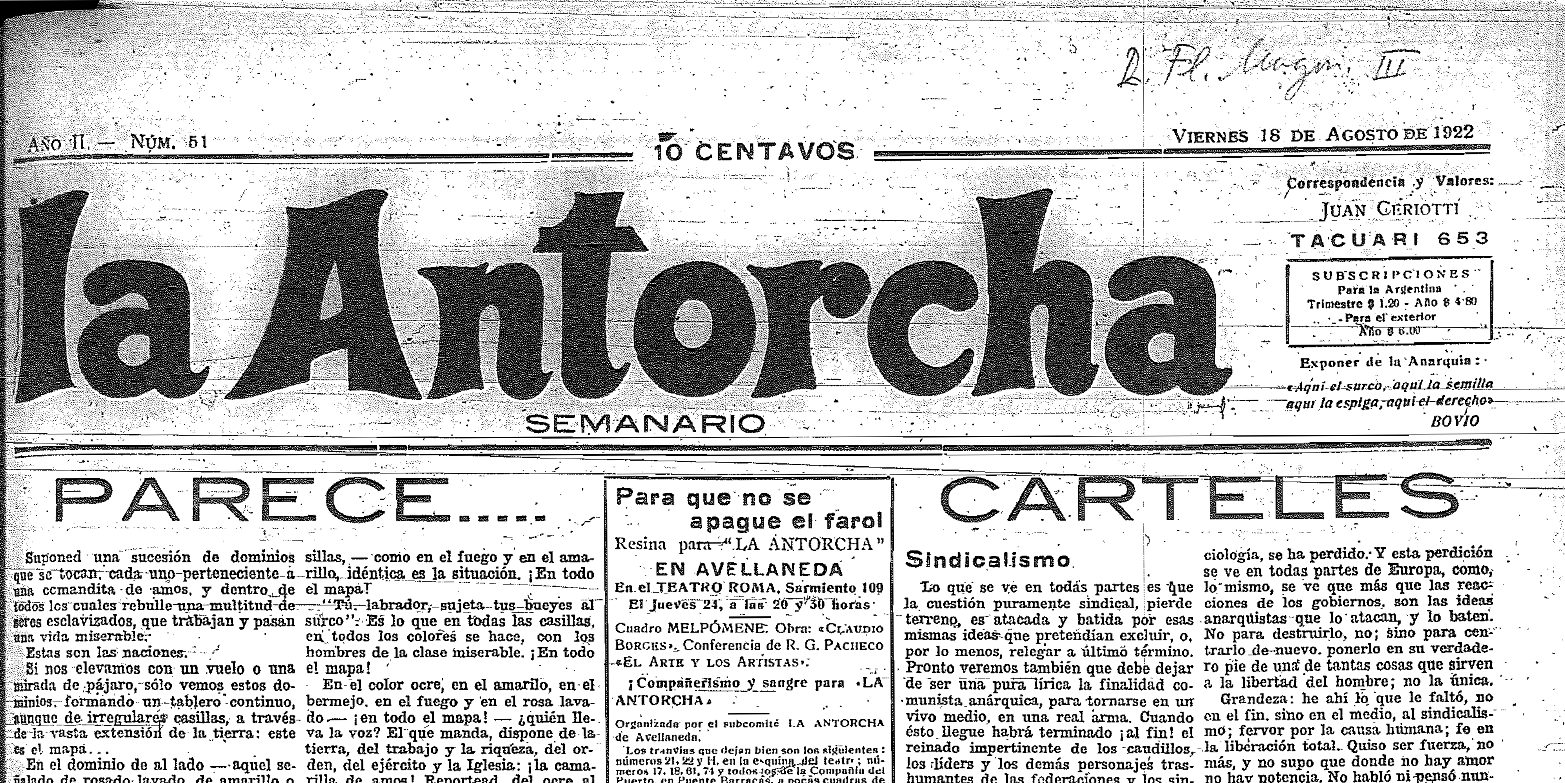
- August 18, 1922, front page
- Type: Newspaper
- Editor: Rodolfo González Pacheco Teodoro Antillí
- Founded: 1921
- Ceased publication: 1932
- City: Buenos Aires
- Country: Argentina

La Antorcha was a weekly newspaper published in Buenos Aires that played a major role in disseminating anarchist thought in Argentina during the 1920s and early 1930s.

Following the Tragic Week (La Semana Tragica) of 1919, the anarchist movement in Argentina continued to face government persecution and internal strife. La Antorcha positioned itself as an alternative to the established anarchist newspaper La Protesta, and anarchist readership was generally divided between the two influential weekly papers.

After José Félix Uriburu's coup d'état in 1930, the newspaper faced constant harassment from the military government. In 1932, La Protesta, La Antorcha, and FORA unions published a manifesto called "Eighteen Months of Military Terror" about the repression they had endured.

The final issue of La Antorcha was published on December 9, 1932.
