= Goodbye Dear Moon =

Adiós Querida Luna
- Theatrical release poster
- Directed by: Fernando Spiner
- Written by: Sergio Bizzio; Valentín Javier Diment; Alejandra Flechner; Fernando Spiner; Alejandro Urdapilleta
- Produced by: Executive Producer: Rolo Azpeitia; Producers: Laura Barroetaveña; Elena Carpman; Ricardo Preve
- Starring: Alejandro Urdapilleta; Alejandra Flechner
- Narrated by: Claudio Rissi
- Cinematography: Claudio Beiza
- Edited by: Alejandro Parysow
- Music by: Valentín Javier Diment; Horacio Fontova; Gustavo Pomeranec
- Distributed by: Primer Plano Film Group S.A.
- Release date: 14 March 2004
- Running time: 100 minutes
- Country: Argentina
- Language: Spanish

Goodbye Dear Moon (Spanish: Adiós querida luna) is a 2004 Argentine sci-fi comedy film directed by Fernando Spiner and written by Spiner, Sergio Bizzio, Valentín Javier Diment, Alejandra Flechner, Alejandro Urdapilleta, and Sergio Bizzio.

== Plot ==
In the year 2068, Earth suffers from a series of natural disasters including typhoons, tsunamis, droughts, and floods. Against this apocalyptic backdrop, an Argentine scientist named Carlos Nahuel Goldstein puts forth a theory. He suggests that Earth's tilted rotational axis, caused by the Moon's gravitational force, could be straightened through the Moon's destruction. This, in turn, would lead to climate stabilization.

Despite international rejection of this idea, the Argentine government takes unilateral action and initiates a covert mission named "Farewell, Beloved Moon" to bombard the Moon. This decision draws the ire of major world powers, who threaten Argentina with harsh economic sanctions. As a result, the mission is forced to halt. The crew of the Estanislao spacecraft, composed of three Argentine astronauts—Commander Humberto Delgado (Gabriel Goity), Subcommander Esteban Ulloa (Alejandro Urdapilleta), and Subcommander Silvia Rodulfo (Alejandra Flechner)—find themselves adrift without control.

Isolated and facing an uncertain fate, emotions and desires among the crewmembers come to the surface. Amidst this backdrop, an extraterrestrial presence observes them, leading to Commander Delgado being ejected into space. Left alone on the ship, Silvia Rodulfo confesses her deep affection for Esteban Ulloa. Her profound passion drove her to become an astronaut, all in an effort to be close to the one she loves. Touched by her confession, Ulloa reciprocates her feelings. The two find themselves akin to an Adam and Eve on the brink of a new universe.

Unexpectedly, the spacecraft is invaded by an extraterrestrial being (Horacio Fontova) who declares his love for Silvia.

== Cast ==
- Alejandro Urdapilleta as Subcommander Esteban Ulloa
- Alejandra Flechner as Subcommander Silvia C. Rodulfo
- Gabriel Goity as Commander Humberto A. Delgado
- Horacio Fontova as García, the extraterrestrial
- Luis Ziembrowsky as the voice of Loiacono
- Rita Morchio as the voice of the "Estanislao" space ship
- Claudio Rissi as the voice of the prologue narrator
- Adela Larreta as Norma
- Manu Soler as a holographic simulation of Diego Maradona

== Awards ==
Wins

- Mar del Plata Film Festival: Best Actor, Alejandro Urdapilleta; 2004.

Nominations

- Argentine Film Critics Association Awards: Silver Condor; Best Costume Design, Ricky Casali and Paola Delgado; 2006.
