= Back in the Seventies =

- Directed by: Francisco Múgica
- Written by: Manuel Agromayor; Tulio Demicheli; Alfredo de la Guardia
- Starring: Silvana Roth; Carlos Cores; María Armand; Alberto Bello
- Cinematography: Hugo Chiesa
- Edited by: José Cañizares
- Music by: Julián Bautista
- Production company: Corporación Cinematográfica Argentina
- Release date: 24 May 1945
- Running time: 90 minutes
- Country: Argentina
- Language: Spanish

Back in the Seventies (Spanish:Allá en el setenta y tantos) is a 1945 Argentine historical melodrama film of the classical era of Argentine cinema, directed by Francisco Múgica and starring Silvana Roth, Carlos Cores and Felisa Mary. Roth plays Cecilia Ramos, a fictionalized version of Élida Paso (1867-1893) an Argentine pharmacist who became the first woman from South America to graduate from a university.

The film's sets were designed by Mario Vanarelli.

== Cast ==
- Silvana Roth as Cecilia Ramos
- Carlos Cores
- María Armand
- Alberto Bello
- Carlos Bellucci
- Olimpio Bobbio
- Dario Garzay
- Gloria Grey
- José María Gutiérrez
- Virginia Luque
- Domingo Mania
- Federico Mansilla
- Felisa Mary
- Mario Medrano
- Gonzalo Palomero
- Matilde Rivera
- Jorge Villoldo
