= Silver Condor Award for Best Original Screenplay =

Annual Argentine film award

The Silver Condor Award for Best Original Screenplay (Spanish: Premio Cóndor de Plata al mejor guion original de ficción), given by the Argentine Film Critics Association, awards the best original screenplay in film in Argentina each year:

Year	Writer	Film
2024	Laura Citarella and Laura Paredes	Trenque Lauquen
2023	Santiago Mitre and Mariano Llinás	Argentina, 1985
2022	Gonzalo Delgado and Ana Katz	The Dog Who Wouldn't Be Quiet
2021	Eduardo Crespo, Lionel Braverman and Santiago Loza	Nosotros nunca moriremos
2020	Santiago Loza	Breve historia del planeta verde
2019	Mariano Llinás	La flor
2018	Diego Lerman and María Meira; Julia Solomonoff and Christina Lazaridi	Una especie de familia Nadie nos mira
2017	Ariel Rotter	La luz incidente
2016	Ana Katz and Inés Bortagaray	Mi amiga del parque
2015	Diego Lerman and María Meira	Refugiado
2014	Juan Taratuto	La reconstrucción
2013	Nicolás Giacobone and Armando Bo; Benjamín Ávila and Marcelo Müller	El último Elvis; Infancia clandestina
2012	Santiago Mitre	El estudiante
2011	Andrés Duprat	El hombre de al lado
2010	Andrés Duprat	El artista
2009	Lucia Cedrón, Santiago Giralt and Thomas Philippon Aginksi	Cordero de Dios
2008	Ariel Rotter	El otro
2007	Daniel Burman	Derecho de familia
2006	Fabián Bielinsky	El aura
2005	Leonardo Di Cesare and Hans Garrino	Buena Vida Delivery
2004	Alejandro Agresti	Valentín
2003	Pablo Solarz	Historias mínimas
2002	Juan José Campanella and Fernando Castets	El hijo de la novia
2001	Fabián Bielinsky	Nueve reinas
2000	Juan José Campanella and Fernando Castets	El mismo amor, la misma lluvia
1999	Oscar Placencia y Raúl Brambilla; Bruno Stagnaro y Adrián Caetano	Sus ojos se cerraron Pizza, birra, faso
1998	Alejandro Agresti	Buenos Aires viceversa
1997	José Pablo Feinmann	Eva Perón
1996	Juan Bautista Stagnaro and Rodolfo Mórtola	Casas de fuego
1995	Tristán Bauer and Carolina Scaglione	Cortázar
1994	Zuhair Jury and Leonardo Favio; Graciela Maglie, Lita Stantic y Gabriela Massuh	Gatica, el mono Un muro de silencio
1993	Adolfo Aristarain, Kathy Saavedra and Alberto Lecchi	Un lugar en el mundo
1992	Tristán Bauer, Rubén Álvarez and Graciela Moglie	Después de la tormenta
1991	Eliseo Subiela	Últimas imágenes del naufragio
1990	Hugo Santiago, Juan José Saer and Jorge Semprún	Las veredas de Saturno
1986	Aída Bortnik and Luis Puenzo	La historia oficial
1983	Oscar Viale and Jorge Goldenberg	Plata dulce
1982	Adolfo Aristarain	Tiempo de revancha
1971	Raúl de la Torre and Héctor Grossi	Juan Lamaglia y señora
1970	David José Kohon; Jorge Luis Borges and Adolfo Bioy Casares	Breve cielo Invasión
1969	Roberto Cossa	Tute cabrero
1968	Jorge Zuhair Jury, Carlos Flores and Leonardo Favio	El romance del Aniceto y la Francisca
1967	Beatriz Guido	El ojo que espía
1966	Jorge Zuhair Jury	Crónica de un niño solo
1962	David José Kohon	Tres veces Ana
1961	Eduardo Borrás	La patota
1960	Leopoldo Torres Ríos	Aquello que amamos
1959	David Viñas	El jefe
1955	Nora Celso and Francisco Guerreño; Luis César Amadori and Pedro Miguel Obligado	El cura Lorenzo; El grito sagrado
1954	Sixto Pondal Ríos and Carlos Olivari	Dock Sud
1953	Carlos Borcosque, Antonio Pagés Larraya and Leopoldo Torre Nilsson	Facundo, el tigre de los llanos
1951	Carlos Orlando and Homero Manzi	Escuela de campeones
1950	Pedro Miguel Obligado	Almafuerte
1947	Tulio Demicheli	Celos
1946	Tulio Demicheli	Cuando en el cielo pasen lista
1945	Roberto Talice and Eliseo Montaine	Centauros del pasado
1944	Eliseo Montaine	Tres hombres del río
1943	Hugo Mac Dougall	Malambo
