= Cirilo Etulain =

Argentine actor

- Born: Argentina
- Died: 1963
- Occupation: Actor
- Years active: 1938-1954 (film)

Cirilo Etulain was an Argentine stage and film actor. He was married to the opera singer Noemí Souza.

== Selected filmography ==
- Educating Niní (1940)
- By the Light of a Star (1941)
- The Song of the Suburbs (1941)
- The Minister's Daughter (1943)
- The Abyss Opens (1945)
- The Three Rats (1946)
- The Naked Angel (1946)
- From Man to Man (1949)
- The Bohemian Soul (1949)

== Bibliography ==
- Alma Vélez. Juan Carlos Thorry, un talentoso seductor: memorias. Corregidor, 2004.
