= Alberto Contreras =

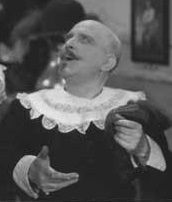
- Contreras in 1942
- Born: Spain
- Died: 1958; Argentina
- Occupation: Actor
- Years active: 1938–1955 (film)

Alberto Contreras (died 1958) was a Spanish-born stage and film actor who settled in Argentina. He portrayed don Florín in the play La sirena varada, written by Alejandro Casona.

== Selected filmography ==
- The Minister's Daughter (1943)
- Our Natacha (1944)
- The Abyss Opens (1945)
- The Sin of Julia (1946)
- A Story of the Nineties (1949)

== Bibliography ==
- Alfred Charles Richard. Censorship and Hollywood's Hispanic image: an interpretive filmography, 1936-1955. Greenwood Press, 1993.
