= Silver Condor Award for Best Adapted Screenplay =

Annual Argentine film award

The Silver Condor Award for Best Adapted Screenplay (Spanish: Premio Cóndor de Plata al mejor guion adaptado), given by the Argentine Film Critics Association, awards the best adapted screenplay in film in Argentina each year:

Year	Writer	Film	Ref.
2021 (69th)	Paula Hernández and Leonel D’Agostino	Las siamesas	
2020 (68th)	Leonel D’Agostino	El hijo	
2018 (67th)	Lola Arias	Teatro de guerra	
2018	Lucrecia Martel	Zama	
2017	Francisco Márquez and Andrea Testa	La larga noche de Francisco Sanctis	
2016	Santiago Mitre and Mariano Llinás	La patota	
2015	Ana Cohan and Miguel Cohan	Betibú	
2014	Lucía Puenzo	Wakolda	
2013	Eugenia Capizzano and Daniel Rosenfeld	Cornelia frente al espejo	
2012	Fernando Spiner, Javier Diment and Santiago Hadida	Aballay, el hombre sin miedo	
2011	Diego Lerman and María Meira	La mirada invisible	
2010	Juan José Campanella and Eduardo Sacheri	El secreto de sus ojos	
2009	Leonardo Favio, Rodolfo Mórtola and Verónica Muriel	Aniceto	
2008	Lucía Puenzo	XXY	
2007	Adrián Caetano, Esteban Student and Julián Loyola	Crónica de una fuga	
2006	Miguel Bonasso, Edgardo Esteban, Tristán Bauer and Gustavo Romero Borri	Iluminados por el fuego	
2005	José Rivera	Diarios de motocicleta	
2004	Ariel Roli Sienra and Luis César D'Angiolillo	Potestad	
2003	Adrián Caetano	Bolivia	
2002	Eduardo Mignogna, Graciela Maglie and Jorge Goldenberg	La fuga	
2001	Marcelo Piñeyro and Marcelo Figueras; Ricardo Piglia and David Lipszyc	Plata quemada El astillero	
2000	Roberto Cossa and Eduardo Calcagno	Yepeto	
1999	Jana Bokova, Gualberto Ferrari and Leslie Megahey	Diario para un cuento	
1998	Guillermo Saccomanno and Juan José Jusid	Bajo bandera	
1997	Mario Levin and Roberto Scheuer	Sotto voce	
1996	Jorge Rocca	Patrón	
1995	Juan Carlos Gené and Alejandro Saderman	Golpes a mi puerta	
1994	María Luisa Bemberg and Jorge Goldenberg; Beda Docampo Feijóo and Juan Bautista Stagnaro	De eso no se habla El marido perfecto	
1993	Deserted		
1992	Carlos Orgambide and Bernardo Roitman	El acompañamiento	
1991	María Luisa Bemberg and Antonio Larreta	Yo, la peor de todas	
1990	Deserted		
1986	Alejandro Doria	Esperando la carroza	
1983	Adolfo Aristarain and José Pablo Feinmann	Últimos días de la víctima	
1981	Raúl de la Torre	El infierno tan temido	
1974	Jorge Zuahir Jury and Leonardo Favio	Juan Moreira	
1972	Julio Mauricio	La valija	
1970	Manuel Antín	Don Segundo Sombra	
1969	Deserted		
1968	Carlos del Peral, César Fernández Moreno, Rodolfo Kuhn and Francisco Urondo	Noche terrible	
1967	Ariel Cortazzo	Del brazo y por la calle	
1962	Augusto Roa Bastos and Solly Schroeder	Alias Gardelito	
1961	Augusto Roa Bastos	Shunko	
1960	Beatriz Guido and Leopoldo Torre Nilsson	La caída	
1959	Mario Soffici and Marco Denevi	Rosaura a las diez	
1957	Sergio Leonardo	Los tallos amargos	
1955	Mario Soffici and Joaquín Gómez Bas	Barrio gris	
1954	Abel Santa Cruz; Alejandro Casona	La mejor del colegio Un ángel sin pudor	
1953	Román Viñoly Barreto and Narciso Ibáñez Menta; Alejandro Casona	La bestia debe morir No abras nunca esa puerta	
1952	Lucas Demare and Ernesto L. Castro	Los Isleros	
1949	Tulio Demicheli	Dios se lo pague	
1947	Tulio Demicheli	Celos	
1946	María Teresa León and Rafael Alberti	La dama duende	
1945	Ulyses Petit de Murat and Homero Manzi	Su mejor alumno	
1944	Pedro E. Pico, Manuel Agromayor and Alfredo de la Guardia	Juvenilia	
1943	Ulyses Petit de Murat and Homero Manzi	La guerra gaucha	
