= El Cura Lorenzo =

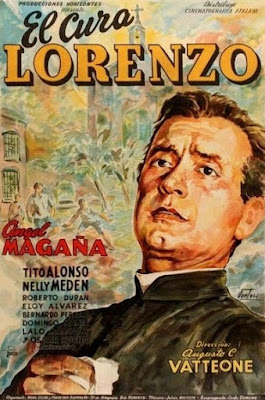
- Directed by: Augusto Cesar Vatteone
- Written by: Osvaldo Falabella, Nora Celso, Francisco Guerreño, Néstor L. Castro
- Starring: Ángel Magaña, Tito Alonso, Nelly Meden
- Cinematography: Bob Roberts
- Edited by: Nello Melli
- Music by: Julian Baptist
- Production company: Horizons Productions
- Release date: 1954
- Running time: 89 minutes
- Country: Argentina
- Language: Spanish

El Cura Lorenzo ("The Priest Lorenzo") is a 1954 Argentine biographical film of the classical era of Argentine cinema, about the life of the Argentine Catholic priest Lorenzo Massa who lived from 1882 to 1949.

== Cast ==
- Ángel Magaña
- Tito Alonso
- Roberto Durán
- Lalo Malcolm
- Domingo Mania
- Nelly Meden
- Esperanza Palomero
- Bernardo Perrone
- Oscar Rovito
- Eloy Álvarez
- Ricardo Greco
