= Rhythm, Salt and Pepper =

1951 film

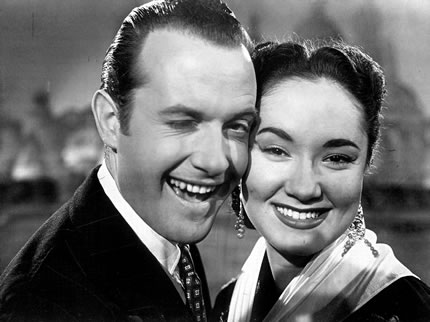
- Ricardo Passano and Lolita Torres
- Directed by: Carlos Torres Ríos
- Written by: Ricardo Lorenzo; Julio Porter
- Produced by: Enrique Carreras
- Starring: Lolita Torres; Ricardo Passano; María Esther Gamas
- Cinematography: Julio C. Lavera
- Edited by: José Cardella
- Music by: Ramón Zarzoso
- Production company: General Belgrano
- Release date: 7 February 1951
- Running time: 88 minutes
- Country: Argentina
- Language: Spanish

Rhythm, Salt and Pepper (Spanish:Ritmo, sal y pimienta) is a 1951 Argentine musical comedy film of the classical era of Argentine cinema, directed by Carlos Torres Ríos and starring Lolita Torres, Ricardo Passano and María Esther Gamas.

== Cast ==
- Lolita Torres — Lolita González Torres
- Ricardo Passano — Gerardo
- María Esther Gamas — Renée
- Mario Baroffio — mr. Alejandro González
- Gogó Andreu — Guillermo
- Tito Climent — Pablo
- María Luisa Santés — aunt Aurora
- Marcos Zucker — Ernesto
- Alfredo Barbieri — José
- Susana Vargas
- Olga Gatti
- Luis Laneri
- Pola Neuman
