= Silvana Roth =

Argentine stage and film actress

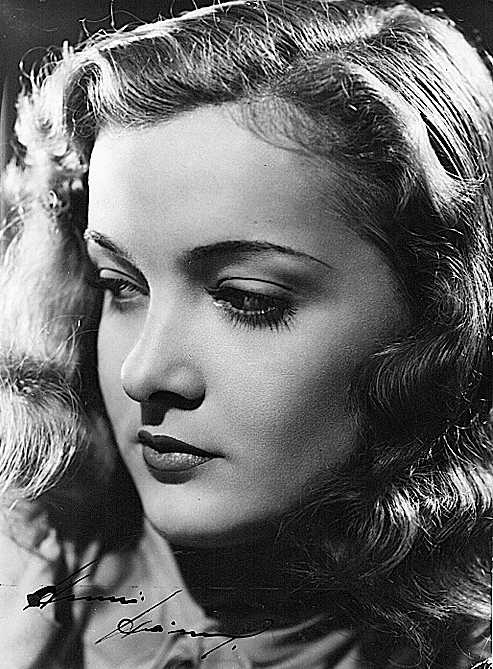
- Silvana Roth in 1942, by Annemarie Heinrich
- Born: 17 February 1924; Genoa, Italy
- Died: 3 April 2010 (aged 86); Buenos Aires, Argentina
- Other name: Silvana Rota
- Occupation: Actor
- Years active: 1940-1971 (film)

Silvana Roth (also known as Silvana Maria Rota, February 17, 1924 – April 3, 2010) was an Argentine stage and film actress. A star of the Golden Age of Argentine cinema, she appeared in twenty six films between 1940 and 1971. Sources differ over her place of birth, with some saying Genoa in Italy and others Buenos Aires.

Politically Roth was a staunch Peronist. She served in the Argentine Chamber of Deputies between 1973 and 1976 before being ousted after the coup that year. She was one of the delegates to the International Women's Year World Conference on Women in 1975.

== Selected filmography ==
- Melodies of America (1941)
- Sweethearts for the Girls (1941)
- The Minister's Daughter (1943)
- Seven Women (1944)
- Back in the Seventies (1945)
- The Abyss Opens (1945)
- School of Champions (1950)

== Bibliography ==
- Melgosa, Adrián Pérez. Cinema and Inter-American Relations: Tracking Transnational Affect. Routledge, 2012.
