= María Teresa Prieto =

Spanish composer

- Born: 1896; Oviedo (Spain)
- Died: January 24, 1982 (aged 85–86); Mexico City (Mexico)
- Occupations: Composer and pianist

María Teresa Prieto (1896 – 1982) was a Spanish composer and pianist who lived and worked in Mexico. Prieto's music was often performed in prestigious venues such as the Palacio de Bellas Artes but was largely forgotten after her death.

Her nephew, Carlos Prieto, is an acclaimed cellist, and her great-nephew, Carlos Miguel Prieto, is the conductor of the North Carolina Symphony.

== Biography ==
=== Early life ===
María Teresa Prieto was born in Oviedo in 1896 to a middle-class Asturian family. Having received musical education themselves, Prieto's parents strongly encouraged her and her siblings to study piano, singing and violin. She studied with pianist and composer Saturnino del Fresno in Asturias. In 1931, she moved to Madrid where she studied with Benito de la Parra at the Conservatory of Madrid. During this time, she was introduced to modal music which greatly influenced her later works. In 1917, she composed a miniature for piano: Escena de niños. This is one of her only surviving early works.

=== Exile ===
In 1935, Prieto's mother died, leaving her alone in Spain. Prieto went to stay with her brother Carlos in Mexico in 1936 during the Spanish Civil War. During her first years in Mexico, Prieto studied with composer Manuel Ponce. She also studied with Darius Milhaud at Mills College in Oakland, California, in 1946 and 1947. She returned to Spain briefly in 1958 to receive the Samuel Ross prize for Modal Quartet, but never returned to live there.

=== Death ===
In 1982, Prieto's health deteriorated. She died on January 24th, 1982, in Mexico City.

== Compositional style ==
During her early music education, Prieto was introduced to the works of J. S. Bach and baroque counterpoint. While studying with Rodolfo Halffter in Mexico, she became interested in the twelve-tone technique. Prieto's music draws inspiration from both Spanish and Mexican culture. She was influenced by Mexican nationalism and Indigenous culture. Her symphonic poem Chichen Itza is inspired by a trip to the Mayan ruins of Chichen Itza. Her song cycle Seis melodias uses nationalist songs from Spain and poetry from Spanish authors including Federico García Lorca and Juan Ramón Jiménez.

While her first compositions from Mexico are for piano, Prieto soon started composing for orchestra. Around the 1950s, she gained an interest in string quartets.

== Selected works ==
=== Orchestral works ===
- Impresión sinfónica (1940) piano and symphony orchestra
- Symphony No. 1 'Asturiana' (1942)
- Chichen Itza, symphonic poem (1944)
- Symphony No. 2 'Breve' (1945)
- Symphony No. 3 'De la danza prima' (1951)
- Cuadros de la naturaleza (1965–67) includes movements Asturias and El valle de México
- El palo verde, ballet suite (1967)

=== Chamber music ===
- Adagio y Fuga (1953) for violoncello and piano
- Modal String quartet (1957)

=== Voice and piano ===
- Seis melodías (1940)
- Ave Maria para Canto y Organo o Piano (1966)
- Cuatro Canciones para Canto y Piano (1971)
- Anoche, cuando dormía (1977)

=== Piano ===
- Añada (1937)
- Preludio y Fuga en Do M (1938)
- Tema y tres variaciones (1938)
