= Our Natacha =

1944 film by Julio Saraceni

- Directed by: Julio Saraceni
- Written by: Alejandro Casona (play)
- Starring: Amelia Bence; Esteban Serrador; Malisa Zini
- Cinematography: José María Beltrán
- Edited by: Oscar Carchano
- Music by: Julián Bautista
- Release date: 7 September 1944
- Running time: 95 minutes
- Country: Argentina
- Language: Spanish

Our Natacha (Spanish:Nuestra Natacha) is a 1944 Argentine drama film of the classical era of Argentine cinema, directed by Julio Saraceni and starring Amelia Bence, Esteban Serrador and Malisa Zini. It is based on Alejandro Casona's play of the same title.

The film's sets were designed by the art director Raúl Soldi.

== Cast ==
- Amelia Bence
- Esteban Serrador
- Malisa Zini
- Juana Sujo
- Homero Cárpena
- Mario Medrano
- Elina Colomer
- Alberto Soler
- Azucena Ferreira
- Francisco López Silva
- Carlos Castro
- Olga Casares Pearson
- Alberto Contreras
- Domingo Márquez
- Ángel Walk
- Adolfo de Almeida
- Ángel Boffa
- Diana Ingro
- Isabel Figlioli

== Bibliography ==
- Plazaola, Luis Trelles. South American Cinema. La Editorial, UPR, 1989.
