= Lorenzo Massa =

Argentine Catholic priest (1882–1949)

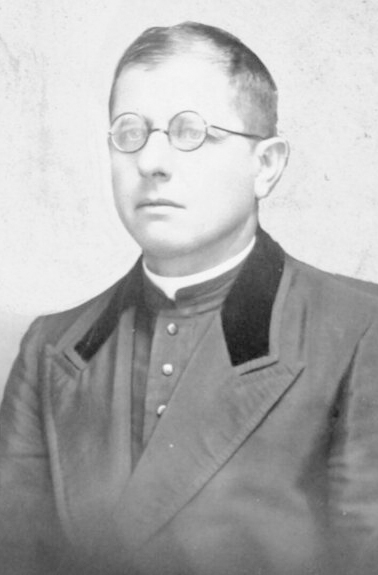
- Massa, c. 1910

Personal details
- Born: Lorenzo Bartolomé Massa; 11 November 1882 Morón Partido, Buenos Aires
- Died: 31 October 1949 (aged 66) Provincia de Buenos Aires
- Denomination: Roman Catholic Church
- Occupation: Catholic priest
- Education: Salesians of Don Bosco

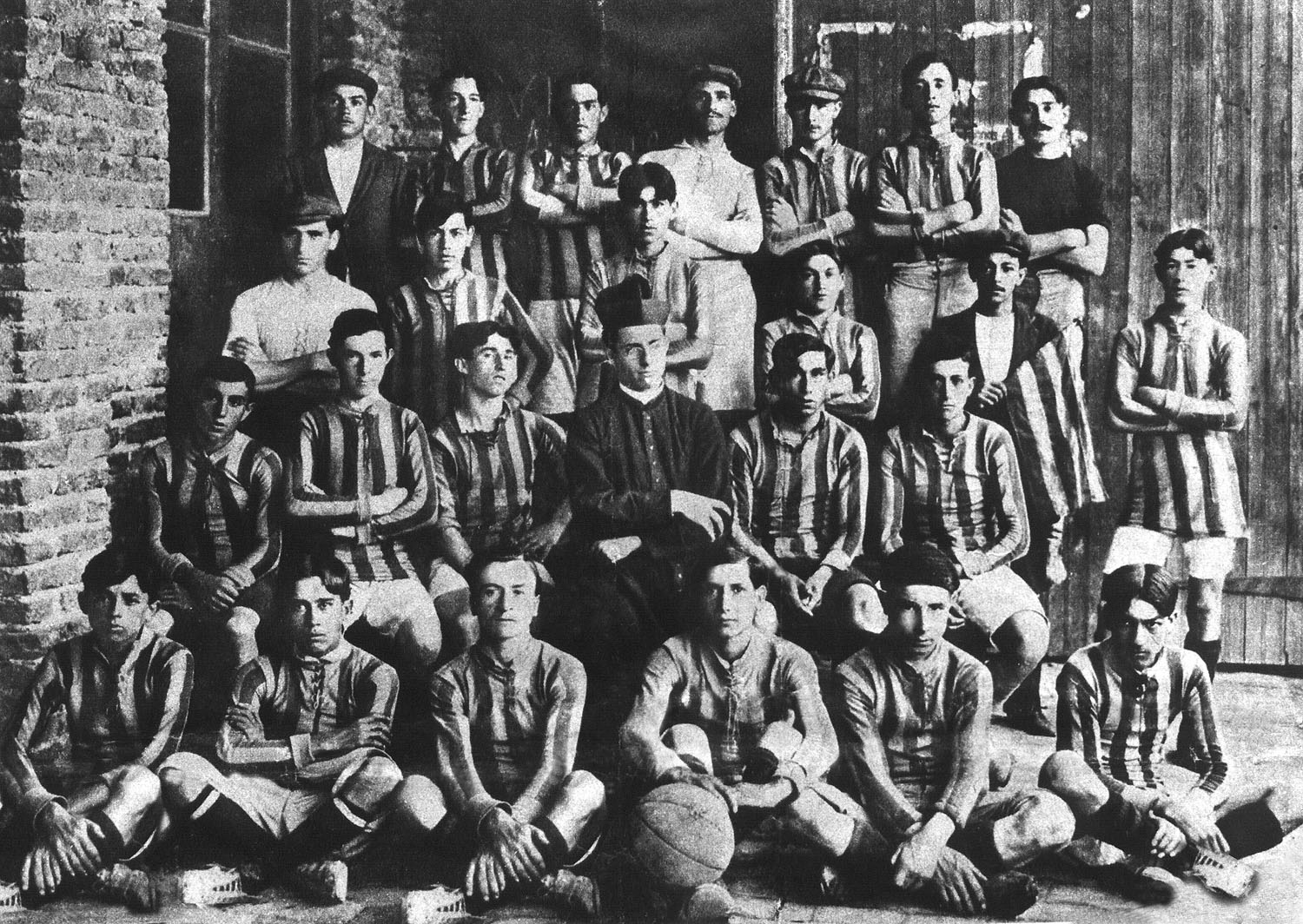
Father Massa (seated at centre) with an earlier San Lorenzo de Almagro team, c. 1908.

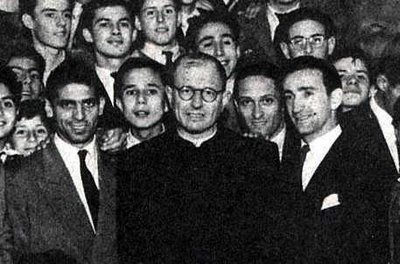
Father Massa (center) with San Lorenzo's idol Rinaldo Martino (left).

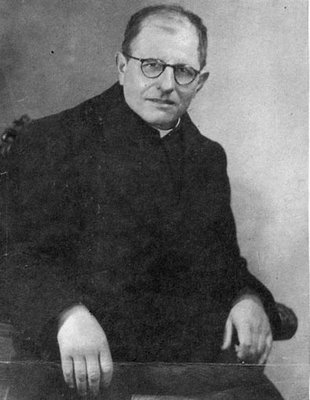
Massa in the 1940s.

Lorenzo Bartolomé Massa (November 11, 1882 – October 31, 1949) was an Argentine Catholic priest. He was one of the main founders of Club San Lorenzo de Almagro and scout group Don Bosco's Argentine Explorers.

== Early years ==
Lorenzo Bartolomé Massa was born in Morón, Buenos Aires, Argentina, and his father, Lorenzo Massa, and mother, Margarita Scanavino, were born in Genova, Italy. His sisters, Ángela and Blanca, were also religious. On February 13, 1898, Lorenza was ordained to the priesthood by Joseph Vespignani. In 1900, Massa took his first job as a Salesian of Don Bosco Agricultural School in Uribelarrea until October 1902. Massa then continued at the College Pius IX as a teacher and assistant in theology. In 1908 he was appointed as the manager of the Oratorio San Antonio, in 4050 Mexico Street in the Almagro neighborhood of Buenos Aires.

== Los Forzosos de Almagro (San Lorenzo) ==
During 1908, Massa met a group of boys from the neighborhood named Los Forzosos del Almagro. The group was led by a young man named Federico Monti. The name, "Los Forzosos del Almagro" defines the virtue of force in the game of football. Facing the drawbacks of playing in the street, the priest offered to let them play in the Oratory of San Antonio. This event would be the preliminary stage of the founding of Club Atlético San Lorenzo de Almagro.

== Explorers of Don Bosco's Argentines ==
On December 14,1875, the first 10 Salesians came to Argentina. Since then, in every city settled, they created works and activities for youth. The Salesians in Argentina turned the whole society "donboscana way to the formation of youth", concretised through the Holidays oratories, which were characterised by joy, Christian upbringing instilled slowly through techniques such as the classic "Goodnight Salesian "and many others, combined with various means of attraction: small works of theater, craft workshops, walks with his classic bands to attract people to the Mass.

The work of the Salesians continued to grow in the formation of Oratorios. Between 1908 and 1914, the bands, the brackets and Battalions Gymnasts, recorded brilliant pages. In all this, the need to beat form a stable body. It was then that Father Joseph Vespignani (at the upper point of the Salesians), which had received reports of current that attracted young people to leave the Church, and had even reached Argentine scoutist version (planned by Robert Baden-Powell, 1st Baron Baden-Powell) wanted ahead of this emerging and influence. Excited about the idea of giving concrete form to something more stable, and recalling Blossio brackets created by Don Bosco at the beginning of his work, combined with the activities of existing brackets gymnasts, he called Father Lorenzo Massa. From that moment, the theoretical and organizational framework of Dom Bosco's Argentine Scouts outlined. Besides participating in the creation, was the first Chaplain Battalion No. 1.

On Sunday, February 28, 1915, Argentine priest Lorenzo Massa received the announcement of a hiking and camping event organized by the Scouts of Argentina. "Is it possible to join this noble institution with our charism?" Massa asked. He presented his draft form, with the children of this company, a Children Battalion, for walks and excursions, as had Don Bosco. On Sunday March 7, after Mass, the children invited were present to join the Children's Battalion. The name originally adopted Child Battalion was the Defenders of the Fatherland, according to the size of each split into nine companies of 30 children. Father Vespignani undertook personally to obtain the appropriate approval of the Superior Chapter of the Salesians of Don Bosco. Some time later, Father Joseph Vespignani called Father Lorenzo Massa, and said: Let's found Don Bosco's Argentine Explorers.

On August 14, 1915, the solemn inauguration of the new school building "Saint Francis of Sales" (homage to Don Bosco on the centenary of his birth), located at the corner where the streets Hipólito Yrigoyen and Yapeyú was placed. The President was received at the entrance of the school by the principal of the house, Father Lorenzo Massa, who to greet said: "Today our house is proud to receive his visit, but we'd be more proud if the President of Argentina agreed to be escorted by our scouts, who today make his first official presentation. "Thus, for a few minutes the honor guard of the President's Office were not the traditional Regiment of Mounted Grenadiers, but was 40 by the first explorers who wore their new uniforms.

Everything became a reality on August 14, 1915 (for this reason, the day designated as Explorer), the celebration of the centenary of the birth of Don Bosco.

In founding the work, Father Jose said "Scouts will be a selection of festive Oratory, where the most prominent oratorians participate in the privileges and responsibilities inherent in Battalions" "We do not introduce anything new in the Salesians of Don Bosco; explorers of Don Bosco Oratory will just be like leaven among others. "And stressed: "You shall preserve lifelong autonomy and self-regulation."

"Explorers of Don Bosco have emerged in the name of God and country to preserve and advance the moral and religious values of youth, arousing noble sentiments of patriotism, twinned with family affection, and respect for authority in a climate of expansive joy healthy companionship. Before the end of year 1, and the battalion had 165 explodes in uniform and perfect discipline" - the first Captain and Chief of the General Command, Mr. Ramón Cortés Conde. That same year, Father Joseph Vespignani was drafted by the Law of Scouts Honor of Don Bosco, published on March 12, 1930.

== Death ==
On the morning of October 31, 1949, Massa did not open the door of his room in Buenos Aires. A janitor entered and found Father Massa dead in his bed. At sixty-six years old, it is believed that he died of cardiac arrest. On October 31, 2008, his remains were deposited in the mausoleum built in his honor located in the Oratorio San Antonio, in 4050 Mexico Street.

== Works ==
Massa arrived in Tucumán in 1916 where he founded the first Salesian work in the province, through an Arts and Crafts Workshop then called Salesian College General Belgrano. He actively participated in the foundation of other Salesian houses, one of which now bears his name: Lorenzo Massa Technical Institute.

== Legacy ==
The film El Cura Lorenzo in 1954, starring actor Ángel Magaña, freely recreates the story of Massa in the San Lorenzo de Almagro's foundation.
