= Vacations in the Other World =

Vacaciones en el otro mundo
- Directed by: Mario Soffici
- Written by: Enrique Amorim; Ramón Gómez Macía
- Release date: 1942
- Country: Argentina
- Language: Spanish

Vacations in the Other World or Vacaciones en el otro mundo is a 1942 Argentine film directed by Mario Soffici during the Golden Age of Argentine cinema. The film, a seriocomedy, explores the gap between the high-pressure world of business and the ambience of domestic living.

== Cast ==
- Elisa Galvé
- José Olarra
- Oscar Valicelli
- Enrique García Satur
- Enrique Chaico
- Lea Conti
- Julio Renato
- Semillita
- Elvira Quiroga
