= Manuel Agromayor =

Argentine screenwriter and journalist

Manuel Agromayor Santiago (21 March 1900 –) was an Argentine screenwriter and journalist from Buenos Aires. At the 1944 Argentine Film Critics Association Awards he won the Silver Condor Award for Best Adapted Screenplay with Pedro E. Pico and Alfredo de la Guardia for Juvenilia. He also wrote the script with de la Guardia for Inspiración (1945) and Allá en el setenta y tantos (1946).

== Selected filmography ==
- Back in the Seventies (1945)
