= Cuando en el cielo pasen lista =

- Directed by: Carlos F. Borcosque
- Written by: Tulio Demicheli
- Starring: Narciso Ibáñez Menta; Aída Albert
- Cinematography: Alberto Etchebehere
- Edited by: Jorge Gárate
- Music by: Alejandro Gutiérrez del Barrio
- Release date: 29 November 1945
- Running time: 123 minutes
- Country: Argentina
- Language: Spanish

Cuando en el cielo pasen lista is a 1945 Argentine film directed by Carlos F. Borcosque during the classical era of Argentine cinema.

== Cast ==
- Narciso Ibáñez Menta
- Ilde Pirovano
- Aída Alberti
- Luis Zaballa
- Juan Carlos Barbieri
- Ricardo Passano
- José Olarra
- Raimundo Pastore
- Homero Cárpena
- Froilán Varela
- Percival Murray
- Zulma de Diego
- Antonio Sember
- Juan Carlos Altavista
- Saúl Jarlip
- Carlos Alberto Campos
- Carlos Belluci
- Julio Cobo
- Margarita Burke
- Ricardo Talesnik
- Enrique Chaico
- Carmen Giménez
