= Judith Sulian =

Argentine film actress

- Born: 13 May 1920; Argentina
- Died: 18 October 1991 (aged 71); Madrid, Spain
- Other name: Amalia Judith Picozzi
- Occupation: Actor
- Years active: 1941-1951 (film)

Judith Sulian (May 13, 1920 – October 18, 1991) was an Argentine film actress. She was awarded the Silver Condor Award for Best Supporting Actress for her performance in The Abyss Opens (1945),

== Selected filmography ==
- Girls Orchestra (1941)
- The Abyss Opens (1945)
- Savage Pampas (1945)
- The Lady of Death (1946)
- The Gambler (1947)

== Bibliography ==
- Abel Posadas, Mónica Landro, Marta Speroni. Cine sonoro argentino: 1933-1943. El Calafate Editores, 2005.
