= Pedro E. Pico =

Argentine dramatist, lawyer, journalist and screenwriter

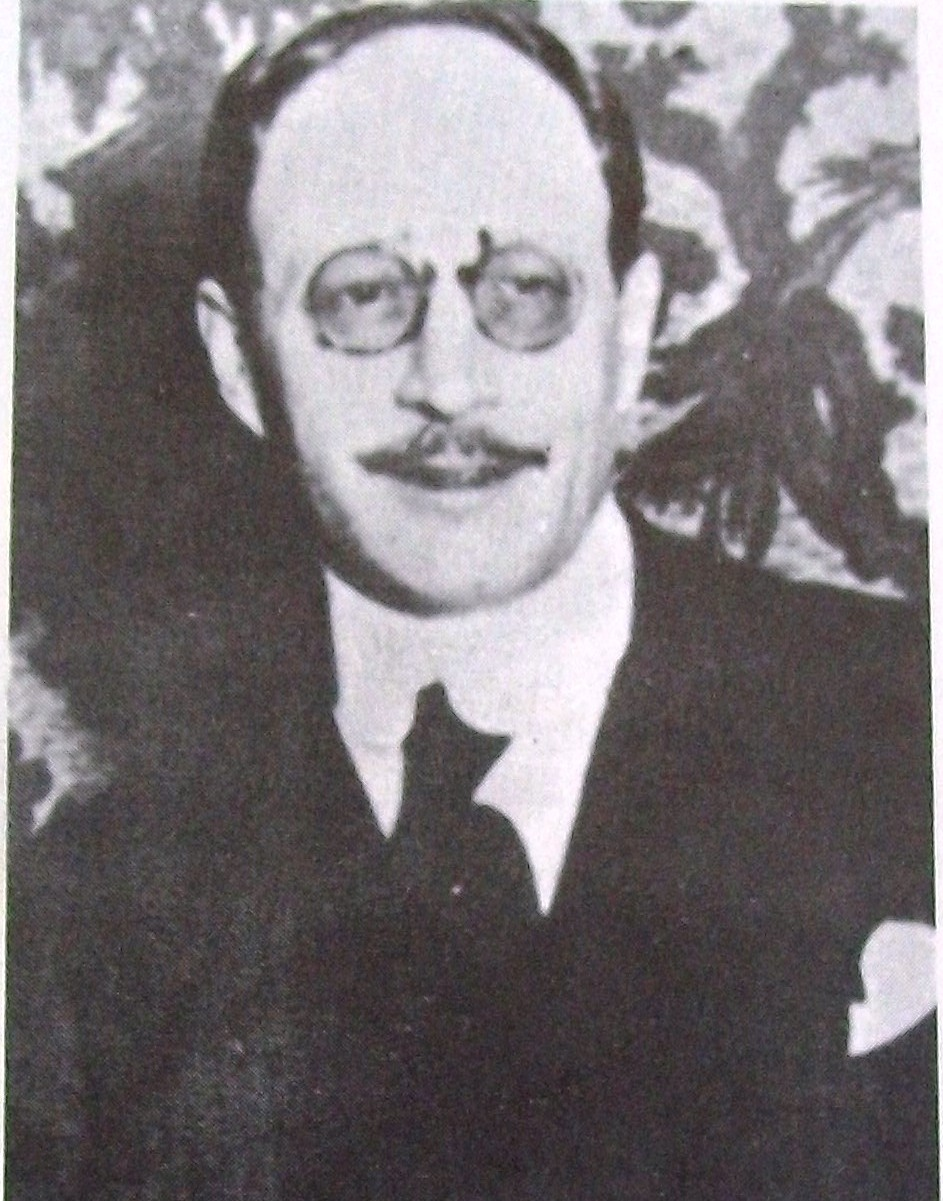
Pedro E. Pico

Pedro E. Pico (27 July 1882 – 12 November 1945) was an Argentine dramatist, lawyer, journalist, and screenwriter. His plays such as La polca del espiante and ¡Para eso se paga! were performed at the Teatro de la Comedia, and he later wrote several plays with Samuel Eichelbaum including Un romance turco (A Turkish Romance) (1920) and La Juana Figueroa (1921).

In the 1940s he became a successful screenwriter. At the 1944 Argentine Film Critics Association Awards, he won the Silver Condor Award for Best Adapted Screenplay with Manuel Agromayor and Alfredo de la Guardia for Juvenilia.

== Plays and screen credits ==
Theatre works

- Querer y cerrar los ojos
- Pueblerina
- Trigo guacho
- San Juancito de Realicó
- La novia de los forasteros
- La historia se repite
- Novelera
- Agua en las manos
- Las rayas de una cruz

Screenwriter

- Con las alas rotas (1938)
- La luz de un fósforo (1940)
- Último refugio (1941)
- Cándida millonaria (1941)
- Story of a Poor Young Man (1942)
- La novia de los forasteros (1942)
- Stella (1943)
- Juvenilia (1943)
- Los hombres las prefieren viudas (1943)
- El Capitán Pérez (1946)
- El diablo andaba en los choclos (1946)
