= Group of Eight (music) =

The Group of Eight (also known by its Spanish name Grupo de los Ocho) was a group of Spanish composers and musicologists, including Jesús Bal y Gay, Ernesto Halffter and his brother Rodolfo, Juan José Mantecón, Julián Bautista, Fernando Remacha, Rosa García Ascot, Salvador Bacarisse and Gustavo Pittaluga. The group, loosely modelled on Les Six and The Five (similar nationalist coalitions of composers), was formed in 1930 to oppose musical conservatism in Spain. Its members, who were closely allied to the literary movement Generation of '27, met in Madrid's Residencia de Estudiantes to perform avant-garde works and discuss the aesthetics of music. The group came to an end with the Spanish Civil War and the ensuing Francoist State when most of its members left Madrid or went into exile abroad.
