= María Rosa Fugazot =

Argentine actress (1942–2026)

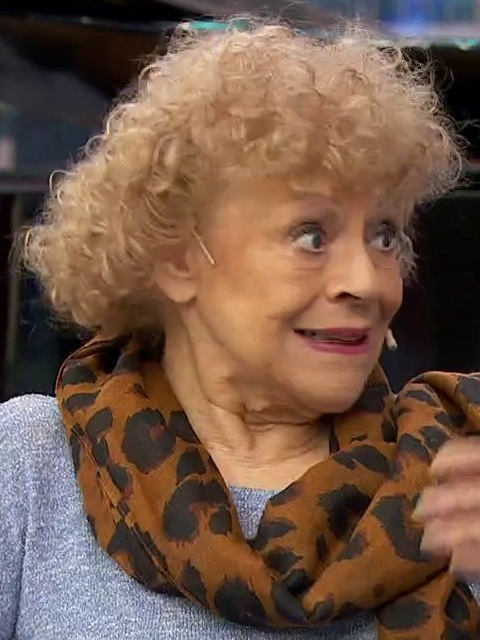
- Fugazot in 2019
- Born: 20 December 1942; Vicente López, Buenos Aires Province, Argentina
- Died: 7 June 2026 (aged 83); Buenos Aires, Argentina
- Occupation: Actress
- Relatives: Roberto Fugazot (father); María Esther Gamas (mother)

María Rosa Fugazot (20 December 1942 – 7 June 2026) was an Argentine actress.

== Life and career ==
Fugazot was born in Vicente López, Buenos Aires, the daughter of Uruguayan-born singer and actor Roberto Fugazot and actress and vedette María Esther Gamas, who was of Chilean and Galician descent. She died in Buenos Aires on 7 June 2026, at the age of 83.
