= Candida, Millionairess =

1941 film by Luis Bayón Herrera

- Directed by: Luis Bayón Herrera
- Written by: Pedro E. Pico
- Cinematography: Roque Funes
- Music by: Alberto Soifer
- Release date: 1941
- Running time: 102 minutes
- Country: Argentina
- Language: Spanish

Candida, Millionairess (Spanish: Cándida millonaria) is a 1941 Argentine musical comedy film of the Golden Age of Argentine cinema, directed by Luis Bayón Herrera and written by Pedro E. Pico.

== Plot ==
A millionaire businessman falls in love with his Galician maid, and decides to marry her despite her daughter's opposition. She mistreats her and even makes her look like a thief, until the real motives are discovered.

== Cast ==
- Niní Marshall ... Cándida
- Alberto Bello
- Armando Bo
- Osvaldo Miranda
- Pedro Vargas
- Alejandro Maximino
- Lucy Galián
- Adrián Cúneo
- María Goicoechea
- Billy Days
- Maruja Vergara
- Susana Castilla
- Regina Laval
- Carlos Roller
- José Dorado
- Lina Estévez
- Vicente Forastieri
- Los Rancheros
