= Diana Cortesina =

Spanish actress (1928–2011)

- Cortesina in 1953
- Born: 1928; Madrid, Spain
- Died: May 22, 2011 (aged 82–83)
- Years active: 1946–1454
- Relatives: Helena Cortesina (sister); Roberto Fugazot (father)

Diana Cortesina (1928 — 22 May 2011) was a Spanish actress and vedette, who worked extensively in Argentina.

== Biography ==
Cortesina was born in Madrid in 1928. Her father being the Uruguayan actor Roberto Fugazot.

Cortesina emigrated to Argentina fleeing the Spanish Civil War. Her sister was the actress and film director, Helena Cortesina. Cortesina died in Madrid on 22 May, 2011.

== Filmography ==
- Milagro de amor (1946)
- The Sin of Julia (1946)
- Un día perdido (1954)
