= Chela Cordero =

Argentine actress (1892–1982)

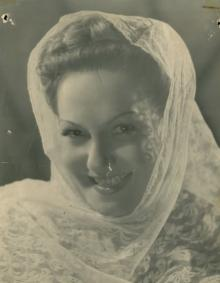
Chela Cordero

Chela Cordero (born Zaira Cordero in Mendoza, 1892–March 24, 1982, in Buenos Aires) was an Argentine actress. In 1943, she starred in Benito Perojo's Stella. She also appeared in films like I Win the War (1943), El pecado de Julia (1946) and Edición extra (1949). She was married to Luis Sandrini.

== Selected filmography ==
- The Sin of Julia (1946)
