= The Gambler (1947 film) =

1947 film

- Directed by: León Klimovsky
- Written by: Manuel Villegas López
- Based on: The Gambler by Fyodor Dostoevsky
- Starring: Roberto Escalada; Judith Sulian; Florindo Ferrario
- Cinematography: Roque Funes
- Edited by: José Cardella
- Music by: Julio Perceval
- Production company: Establecimientos Filmadores Argentinos
- Distributed by: Establecimientos Filmadores Argentinos
- Release date: 22 October 1947
- Running time: 72 minutes
- Country: Argentina
- Language: Spanish

The Gambler (Spanish: El jugador) is a 1947 Argentine drama film directed by León Klimovsky and starring Roberto Escalada, Judith Sulian and Florindo Ferrario. noirish in style, it is an adaptation of the 1866 novel The Gambler by Fyodor Dostoevsky. It changes the setting from a nineteenth century German spa town to Buenos Aires and its vicinity in the mid-twentieth century. The film's sets were designed by the art director Juan Manuel Concado. It was Klimovsky's debut as a director.

== Synopsis ==
A man develops an all-consuming obsession with gambling to cope with a disappointment in romance. His addiction increasingly dominates his entire life.

== Cast ==
- Roberto Escalada as Andrés
- Judith Sulian as Paulina
- Florindo Ferrario as Barón de Segal
- Alberto Bello as Dr Guerrero
- Amalia Sánchez Ariño as Tia
- Pedro Laxalt as Carlos
- Haydeé Larroca as Blanche
- Angel Boffa
- Walter Jacob

== Bibliography ==
- Gubern, Román. Cine español en el exilio, 1936–1939. Lumen, 1976.
- King, John & Torrents, Nissa (ed.) The Garden of Forking Paths: Argentine Cinema. British Film Institute, 1988.
- Mira, Alberto. Historical Dictionary of Spanish Cinema. Scarecrow Press, 2010.
