= Alfredo de la Guardia =

Argentine screenwriter

Alfredo de la Guardia was an Argentine screenwriter. At the 1944 Argentine Film Critics Association Awards he won the Silver Condor Award for Best Adapted Screenplay with Pedro E. Pico and Manuel Agromayor for Juvenilia. He also wrote the script with Agromayor for Inspiración (1945) and Back in the Seventies (1945).

== Selected filmography ==
- Back in the Seventies (1945)
