= Juvenilia (film) =

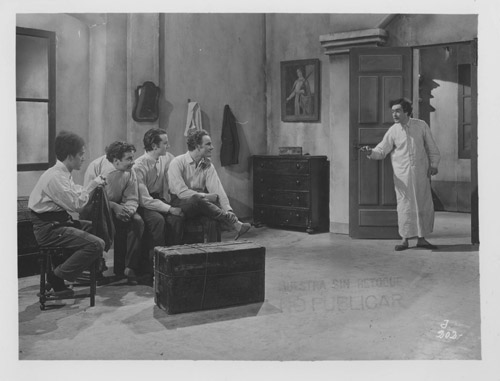
- Directed by: Augusto César Vatteone
- Written by: Pedro E. Pico, Manuel Agromayor and Alfredo de la Guardia
- Cinematography: Francis Boeniger, Hugo Chiesa, Mario Pagés
- Edited by: José Cañizares, Gori Muñoz
- Music by: Alejandro Gutiérrez del Barrio
- Production company: Estudios San Miguel
- Release date: 31 May 1943 (Buenos Aires)
- Running time: 104 minutes
- Country: Argentina
- Language: Spanish

Juvenilia is a 1943 Argentine comedy-drama film of the classical era of Argentine cinema directed by Augusto César Vatteone. One of the most critically acclaimed Argentine films of 1943, at the 1944 Argentine Film Critics Association Awards the film won the Silver Condor Award for Best Film, Best Director for Vatteone, Best Supporting Actor for Eloy Álvarez and Best Adapted Screenplay for writers Pedro E. Pico, Manuel Agromayor and Alfredo de la Guardia.

== Cast ==
- Elisa Christian Galvé
- José Olarra
- Ernesto Vilches
- Eloy Álvarez
- Ricardo Passano
- Hugo Pimentel
- Mario Medrano
- Rafael Frontaura
- Gregorio Verdi
- Domingo Márquez
