= Augusto César Vatteone =

Argentine film director and screenwriter

Augusto Cesar Vatteone (24 October 1904 – 7 December 1979 in Buenos Aires) was an Argentine film director and screenwriter of the Golden Age of Argentine cinema. His 1943 film Juvenilia was highly acclaimed in Argentina, and he won the Silver Condor Award for Best Director and Best Film for it at the 1944 Argentine Film Critics Association Awards.

== Filmography ==
Director

- Pibelandia (1935)
- Giácomo (1939)
- A Thief Has Arrived (1940)
- Juvenilia (1943)
- Al marido hay que seguirlo (1948)
- Cinco grandes y una chica (1950)
- Cinco locos en la pista (1950)
- El cura Lorenzo (1954)
- La muerte flota en el río (1956)

Screenwriter

- El último encuentro (1938)
- Giácomo (1939)
- Ha entrado un ladrón (1940)
- Mamá Gloria (1941)
- La muerte flota en el río (1956)
