= Gold in the Hand =

1943 film by Adelqui Migliar

- Directed by: Adelqui Migliar
- Written by: José Ramón Luna; Manuel Villegas López
- Starring: Sebastián Chiola; José Olarra; Pepita Serrador
- Cinematography: Gumer Barreiros
- Edited by: Gerardo Rinaldi
- Music by: Lucio Demare
- Production company: Pampa Film
- Release date: 1943
- Running time: 100 minutes
- Country: Argentina
- Language: Spanish

Gold in the Hand (Spanish:Oro en la mano) is a 1943 Argentine drama film of the classical era of Argentine cinema directed by Adelqui Migliar and starring Sebastián Chiola, José Olarra and Pepita Serrador.

== Cast ==
- Sebastián Chiola
- José Olarra
- José Ruzzo
- Domingo Sapelli
- Pepita Serrador
- Froilán Varela

== Bibliography ==
- Alfred Charles Richard. Censorship and Hollywood's Hispanic image: an interpretive filmography, 1936-1955. Greenwood Press, 1993.
