= The Abyss Opens =

1945 film

- Directed by: Pierre Chenal
- Written by: Vicente Chas Madariaga; Augusto A. Guibourg; León Klimovsky; John Knittel
- Produced by: Jaime Prades
- Starring: Sebastián Chiola; Silvana Roth; Ricardo Passano
- Cinematography: Bob Roberts
- Edited by: Pierre Chenal; Antonio Cunill Jr. Kurt Land
- Music by: Juan Ehlert
- Production company: Pampa Film
- Release date: 16 March 1945
- Running time: 96 minutes
- Country: Argentina
- Language: Spanish

The Abyss Opens (Spanish: Se abre el abismo) is a 1945 Argentine thriller film of the classical era of Argentine cinema, directed by Pierre Chenal and starring Sebastián Chiola, Silvana Roth and Ricardo Passano. The film's sets were designed by the art director Álvaro Durañona y Vedia.

== Cast ==
- Sebastián Chiola as Juez Eduardo Cáceres
- Silvana Roth as Silvia Ferry
- Ricardo Passano as Martín Ferry
- Homero Cárpena as Gregorio Andrada
- Guillermo Battaglia as Pedro Ferry
- Judith Sulian as María Ferry
- Ana Arneodo as Sra. Casares
- Carlos Bellucci as Sr. Terrada
- Armando Bo as Lucio Terrada
- Juan Bono as Juez reemplazante
- Alberto Contreras as Mariano Fábregas
- Cirilo Etulain as Empleado de juzgado
- Francisco García Garaba as Juez Bergara
- Pedro Laxalt as Dr. Morales
- Elsa O'Connor as Sra. Ferry
- Amelia Senisterra as Sra. Terrada

== Bibliography ==
- Plazaola, Luis Trelles. South American Cinema: Dictionary of Film Makers. La Editorial, UPR, 1989.
- Thompson, Currie K. Picturing Argentina: Myths, Movies, and the Peronist Vision. Cambria Press, 2014.
- Wolf, Sergio, Cine argentino: la otra historia. Letra Buena, 1994.
