= The Sin of Julia =

1946 film

- Directed by: Mario Soffici
- Written by: Tulio Demicheli; René Garzón
- Based on: Miss Julie by August Strindberg
- Starring: Amelia Bence; Aída Luz; Alberto Closas
- Cinematography: Mario Pagés
- Edited by: Nicolás Proserpio
- Music by: Alejandro Gutiérrez del Barrio
- Production company: Estudios San Miguel
- Distributed by: Estudios San Miguel
- Release date: 5 June 1946
- Running time: 90 minutes
- Country: Argentina
- Language: Spanish

The Sin of Julia (Spanish: El pecado de Julia) is a 1946 Argentine melodrama film of the classical era of Argentine cinema, directed by Mario Soffici and starring Amelia Bence, Aída Luz and Alberto Closas. It is an adaptation of August Strindberg's 1888 play Miss Julie. The film's sets were designed by the art director Gori Muñoz.

== Cast ==
- Amelia Bence as La Señorita Julia
- Aída Luz as Cristina
- Alberto Closas as Juan
- Milagros de la Vega as Karen
- Alberto Contreras as Pedro
- Carlos Lagrotta as Conrado
- Diana Cortesina as Agatha
- María Esther Emery
- Juan Pecci
- Chela Cordero
- Diana Wells
- Ana Gryn
- Jorge Villoldo
- José María Navarro
- Pepita González
- Antonio Moro
- Ricardo Monner Sáns
- Carlos Rivas

== Bibliography ==
- Ricardo García Oliveri. Cine argentino: crónica de 100 años. Manrique Zago Ediciones, 1997.
