= The Minister's Daughter (1943 film) =

1943 film

- Directed by: Francisco Múgica
- Written by: Carlos A. Olivari; Francisco Oyarzábal; Sixto Pondal Ríos
- Starring: Enrique Serrano; Silvana Roth; Juan Carlos Thorry
- Cinematography: Alfredo Traverso
- Edited by: Antonio Rampoldi
- Music by: Bert Rosé
- Production company: Lumiton
- Distributed by: Lumiton
- Release date: 3 February 1943
- Running time: 77 minutes
- Country: Argentina
- Language: Spanish

The Minister's Daughter (Spanish: La hija del ministro) is a 1943 Argentine comedy film of the classical era of Argentine cinema directed by Francisco Múgica and starring Enrique Serrano, Silvana Roth and Juan Carlos Thorry. The film's sets were designed by the art director Ricardo J. Conord. It reflects Peronist ideology even though it premiered several months before the June Revolution.

== Synopsis ==
Adriana is the daughter of a factory owner who has recently been appointed a minister. She is angered when her father is criticised by Luis Orlandi a socialist deputy. In order to assist her father she poses as one of his employees and goes to Orlandi for help, hoping to gain information that will help her father. Instead, she discovers that her father has been selling defective products. She and Orlandi ultimately fall in love and she joins his commitment to help the underprivileged.

== Cast ==
- Enrique Serrano as Gervasio Correa
- Silvana Roth as Adriana
- Juan Carlos Thorry as Luis Orlandi
- Osvaldo Miranda as César Vélez
- Juan José Porta as Olmos
- Warly Ceriani as Méndez
- Enrique Salvador as Don Fermín
- Alberto Contreras as El duque
- Domingo Mania as Gálvez
- Cirilo Etulain as Ledesma

== Bibliography ==
- Richard, Alfred. Censorship and Hollywood's Hispanic image: an interpretive filmography, 1936-1955. Greenwood Press, 1993.
- Thompson, Currue K. Picturing Argentina: Myths, Movies, and the Peronist Vision. Cambria Press, 2014.
