= Silver Condor Award for Best Animated Feature =

Annual Argentine film award

The Silver Condor Award for Best Animated Feature (Spanish: Premio Cóndor de Plata al mejor largometraje de animación), given by the Argentine Film Critics Association, awards the best animated feature film in Argentina each year. The first award was given in 2001. The award has not been granted since 2008.

Year	Film	Director
2008	El arca	Juan Pablo Buscarini
2007	El ratón Pérez	Juan Pablo Buscarini
2005	Patoruzito	José Luis Massa
2003	Mercano, el marciano	Juan Antín
2001	Cóndor Crux	Juan Pablo Buscarini, Swan Glecer and Pablo Holcer
