= Conrado del Campo =

Spanish composer (1878–1953)

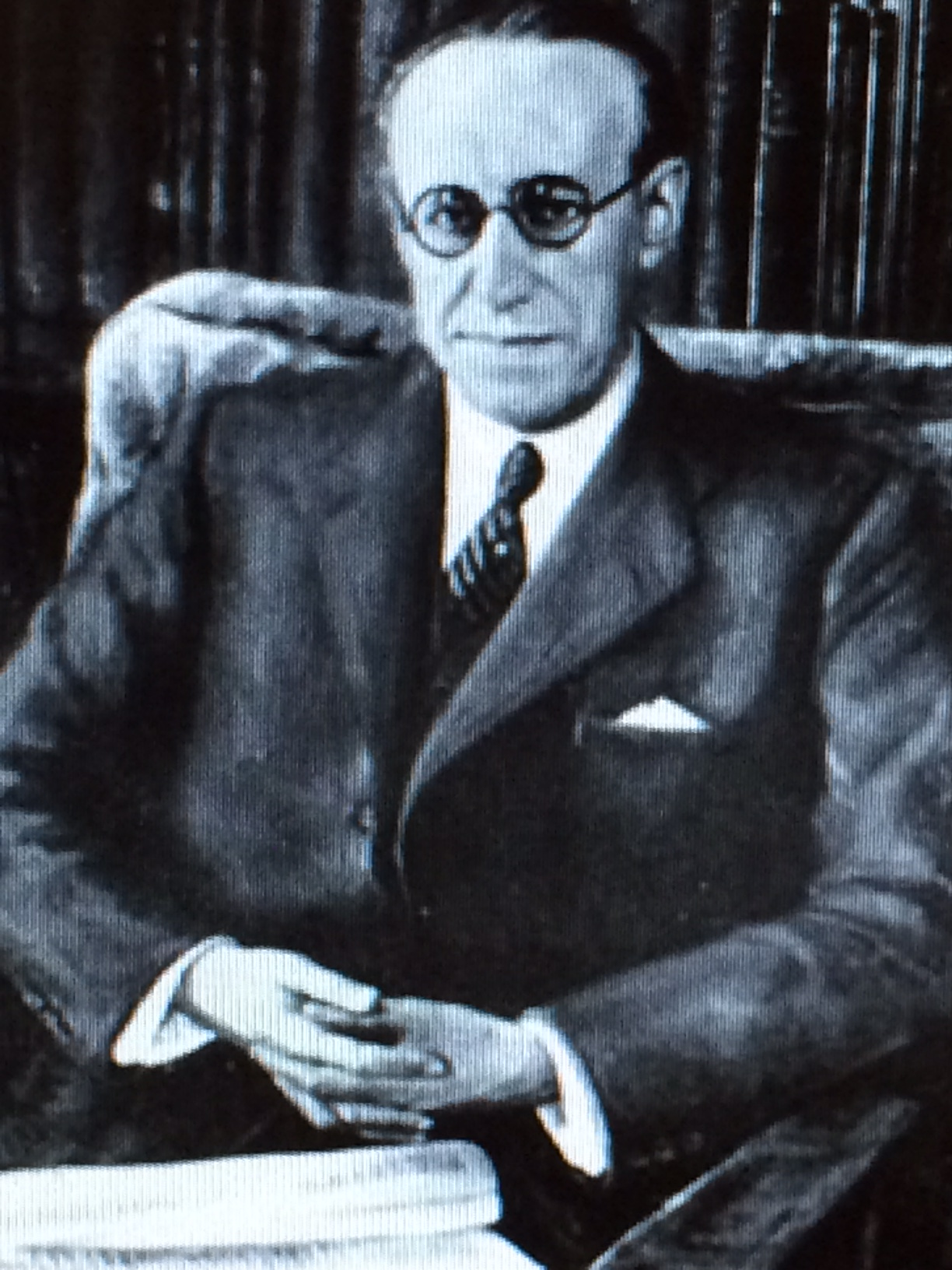
Conrado del Campo y Zabaleta

Conrado del Campo y Zabaleta (28 October 1878 – 17 March 1953) was a Spanish composer, violinist and pedagogue.

== Career ==
Del Campo was born in Madrid. He became professor at the Madrid Royal Conservatory in 1915, where he was an influential teacher. Among his pupils were Salvador Bacarisse, Julián Bautista, and Fernando Remacha. See: List of music students by teacher: C to F#Conrado del Campo.

His compositions were played in the Theatre Real of Madrid for José María Alvira. His opera Lola la Piconera made its debut at the Gran Teatre del Liceu, Barcelona, 12 December 1952. He was also the principal conductor of the Madrid Symphony Orchestra.

Del Campo was a major figure in the conservative musical climate during the period of rule by Francisco Franco, writing in a late Romantic style.

He died in Madrid aged 74.

== Selected works ==
=== Symphonic works ===
Del Campo's characteristic symphonic music takes the form of evocative tone poems.

- Ante las ruinas (Before the Ruins, 1898)
- La dama de Amboto (The Lady of Amboto, 1901)
- Two Parts from the Divina Commedia
  - Prologue (1908)
  - Inferno (1910)
- Bocetos castellanos (Castilian Sketches, 1911)
- Granada, a symphonic poem (1913)
- Fantasía sobre temas del Maestro Chapí (Fantasy on themes of Master Chapi, 1913)
- Kásida (1922)
- Obertura madrileña, a concert overture (1930)
- Suite madrileña (1934)
- Ofrenda a los caídos (Offering to the Fallen, 1944)
- Poema de Castilla (Castilian Poem, 1948)
- Poema de las Cantigas (Poem of the Songs, before 1950)
- Poema de la Natividad (Poem of the Nativity, before 1950)
- Evocación y nostalgia de los molinos de viento (Evocation and Nostalgia of Windmills, 1952)

=== Concertante works ===
- Fantasía castellana, for piano and orchestra (1939)
- Suite for viola and small orchestra (1940)
- Violin Concerto (1943)
- Evocación de Castilla for piano and orchestra (1943)
- Cello Concerto (1944)
- Evocación y nostalgia de los molinos de viento
- Tríptico castellano
- El viento de Castilla
- Poema de los loores de María, symphonic poem for viola and orchestra (1944)

=== Chamber music ===
- Romanza in F major for viola and piano, Op. 5 (1901)
- Pequeña pieza for viola and piano, Op. 6 (1906)
- String Quartet No. 1 in D minor, Oriental (1903)
- String Quartet No. 2 in A major, A buen juez mejor testigo (1907)
- String Quartet No. 3 in C minor, Cuarteto castellano (1908)
- String Quartet No. 4 in C major, El Christo de la Vega, Musical commentary to Zorrilla's poem, divided into six impressions. (with spoken word)
- String Quartet No. 5 in F minor, Caprichos Románticos (1908)
- String Quartet No. 6 in B minor, Asturian (1909)
- String Quartet No. 7 in E minor (1911)
- String Quartet No. 8 in E major (1913)
- String Quartet No. 9 in D major, Apassionado (1942)
- String Quartet No. 10 in F major, Castilian (1945)
- String Quartet No. 11 in E major (1947)
- String Quartet No. 12 in B flat major (1948)
- String Quartet No. 13 in A major, Carlos III (1949)
- String Quartet No. 14 in D major (1952)
- Piano Quintet in E major, Episodio de una vida combatida y dolorosa (1939; adaptation of String Quartet No. 8)

=== Piano Music ===
- León
- Danza del Bufón (based on a poem by Castilla)

=== Zarzuelas ===
- Aires de la Sierra
- El burlador de Toledo

=== Choral works ===
- Castilla
- El viento de Fuensaldaña
- Seis canciones Castellanas ("Six Castilian songs")

== Sources ==
- Antonio Iglesias, Monografia Nº 4: Conrado del Campo, Orquesta y Coro de la Comunidad de Madrid (in Spanish). Accessed 28 October 2008.
