= Roberto Fugazot =

Uruguayan actor (1902–1971)

- Born: 20 June 1902; Montevideo, Uruguay
- Died: 8 August 1971 (aged 69); Buenos Aires, Argentina
- Occupation: Actor
- Years active: 1933–1964 (film)

Roberto Fugazot (20 June 1902 – 8 August 1971) was a Uruguayan tango singer and film actor. Fugazot appeared in eighteen films including Savage Pampas (1945). He was the father of Diana Cortesina. He was married to the actress María Esther Gamas, with whom he had a daughter María Rosa Fugazot who also became an actress.

== Selected filmography ==
- Savage Pampas (1945)

== Bibliography ==
- Finkielman, Jorge. The Film Industry in Argentina: An Illustrated Cultural History. McFarland, 24 Dec 2003. ISBN 978-0-7864-1628-8
