= María Esther Gamas =

Argentine actress (1911–2006)

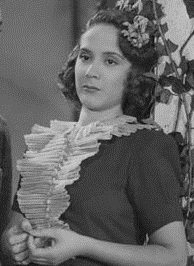
- María Esther Gamas in 1941
- Born: 21 April 1911; Rosario, Argentina
- Died: 21 September 2006 (aged 95); Buenos Aires, Argentina
- Occupation: Actress
- Years active: 1931–1976 (film)
- Relatives: María Rosa Fugazot (daughter); Gogó Andreu (sister-in-law)

María Esther Gamas (21 April 1911 – 21 September 2006) was an Argentine stage and film actress. She appeared in 20 films, including Savage Pampas (1945), and was one of the stars of the Golden Age of Argentine Cinema.

== Biography ==
María Esther was born to a Chilean mother and a Galician father in Santa Fe. She was married to musician Roberto Fugazot, with whom she had a daughter, María Rosa Fugazot, who is also an actress.

== Selected filmography ==
- By the Light of a Star (1941)
- When the Heart Sings (1941)
- Savage Pampas (1945)
- Rhythm, Salt and Pepper (1951)

== Bibliography ==
- Finkielman, Jorge. The Film Industry in Argentina: An Illustrated Cultural History. McFarland, 24 December 2003.
