= Carlos Bellucci =

Argentine actor

- Carlos Bellucci in 1946
- Born: 1895; Buenos Aires, Argentina
- Died: 1953 (aged 57-58); Buenos Aires, Argentina
- Occupation: Actor
- Years active: 1938-1954 (film)

Carlos Bellucci (1895–1953) was an Argentine actor who appeared in thirty-one films during his career. He also appeared frequently on stage.

== Selected filmography ==
- The Caranchos of Florida (1938)
- Candida, Woman of the Year (1943)
- The Abyss Opens (1945)
- Passport to Rio (1948)
- Valentina (1950)

== Bibliography ==
Pellettieri, Osvaldo. Pirandello y el teatro argentino (1920-1990). Editorial Galerna, 1997.
