= Teodoro Antillí =

Argentine journalist and anarchist

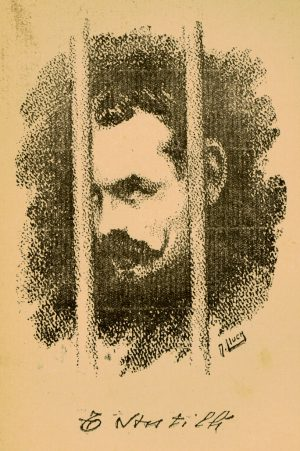
- Born: July 27, 1883; San Pedro, Buenos Aires
- Died: August 8, 1923 (aged 40); San Pedro, Buenos Aires
- Occupation: Journalist

Teodoro Antillí (1883–1923) was an Argentine anarchist and journalist.

== Early life and career ==
Teodoro Antillí was born in San Pedro, Buenos Aires, on July 27, 1883. In his youth, he worked at the city's civil registry. As a teenager, he clerked for the local police and left the job at age 21 after becoming involved in anarchism. He moved to Buenos Aires and wrote for magazines such as Fray Mocho and Mundo Argentino, and wrote for the libertarian press. When writing for Germinal in 1906, he met Rodolfo González Pacheco, who became a lifelong friend. The pair edited La Campana Nueva the next year. Their anarchist daily La Batalla was short-lived, starting and ending in 1910 with the Argentina Centennial's suppression of anarchism, as the pair were arrested and imprisoned in Ushuaia.

Upon their release, Antillí and Pacheco founded the newspaper Alberdi and, in 1911, the short-lived journal El Manifiesto. While Pacheco was out of the country, Antillí joined the staff of La Protesta and spent three additional years in prison for an article defending Simón Radowitzky. He left La Protesta in 1916 and, with Pacheco back in the country, they unsuccessfully attempted to create La Protesta Humana. Instead they created La Obra, which was originally influenced by the 1917 Russian Revolution but eventually moved away from Bolshevism and refused an "anarcho-Bolshevik" offer to launch a journal together. La Obra was suppressed and shuttered during the January 1919 Tragic Week. Their next anarchist daily, Tribuna Proletaria, was overrun by the anarcho-Bolsheviks by its end in March 1919. Antillí and Pacheco founded El Libertario in 1920 and the anarchist weekly La Antorcha in 1921. The latter veered towards insurrectionary anarchism and Antillí was among its most prolific writers.

Suffering from illness, Antillí returned to his hometown in 1923 where he died on August 8. He was buried beneath an eucalyptus tree. His unpublished articles continued to be printed in La Antorcha after his death. In 1924, Pacheco published his articles from the weekly magazine into a posthumous book, ¡Salud a la Anarquía!
