= The Desert Bride (2017 film) =

2017 film

- Film poster
- Directed by: Cecilia Atán; Valeria Pivato
- Written by: Cecilia Atán; Valeria Pivato
- Starring: Paulina García; Claudio Rissi
- Music by: Leo Sujatovich
- Release date: 18 May 2017 (Cannes)
- Running time: 85 minutes
- Countries: Argentina; Chile
- Language: Spanish

The Desert Bride (Spanish: La novia del desierto) is a 2017 Argentine-Chilean drama film directed by Cecilia Atán and Valeria Pivato. It was screened in the Un Certain Regard section at the 2017 Cannes Film Festival.

== Plot ==
The story follows Teresa, a 54-year-old domestic employee in Buenos Aires who has become accustomed to the routine of her work. However, after her employers decide to sell their home and terminate her service, she is left with few options but to accept a job in the distant province of San Juan, despite her aversion to travel. Along the way, she loses her bag and finds herself in need of assistance. This leads her to team up with a traveling salesman, who becomes her unlikely companion on a journey that offers both challenges and unexpected opportunities for personal growth. Despite the setbacks she encounters, Teresa ultimately finds redemption and renewal in the face of adversity.

== Cast ==
- Paulina García as Teresa
- Claudio Rissi as El Gringo

== Reception ==
On review aggregator Rotten Tomatoes, the film holds an approval rating of 89%, based on 28 reviews with an average rating of 7.10/10. Metacritic gives the film a weighted average score of 68 out of 100, based on 9 critics, indicating "generally favorable reviews".

Ben Kenigsberg of The New York Times called the film "a road movie of sorts" and added that "it steers clear of melodrama or sentimentality, but it also never risks hitting anything".

Guy Lodge of Variety called The Desert Bride "a loving showcase" and "equally beguiling". He also praised its star's "finely wrought powers of expression" and the film's "gentle observational acuity and surprisingly inventive visuals".

According to David Rooney of The Hollywood Reporter, the film is "delicate" and is "spareness of both the physical and emotional landscapes".
