= Eloy Álvarez =

Argentine actor

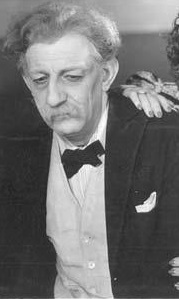
Eloy Álvarez

Eloy Álvarez (1896–1951) was an Argentine actor of the classic period of Argentine cinema. At the 1944 Argentine Film Critics Association Awards he won the Silver Condor Award for Best Supporting Actor for his performance in the critically acclaimed comedy-drama Juvenilia. He later starred in the successful picture Dark River (Las aguas bajan turbias) in 1952.

== Selected filmography ==
- The Gaucho Priest (1941)
- Paradise (1953)
