= 76 89 03 =

- Theatrical release poster
- Directed by: Cristian Bernard; Flavio Nardini
- Written by: Bernard; Nardini
- Produced by: Orlando Rodriguez
- Starring: Sol Alac; Sergio Baldini; Gerardo Chendo; Diego Mackenzie
- Cinematography: Daniel Garcia
- Edited by: Elianne Katz
- Music by: Sergio Figueroa
- Production companies: A La Produ 90'; Atomic Films
- Release date: 2000
- Running time: 85 minutes
- Country: Argentina
- Language: Spanish
- Budget: approx. $50,000

76 89 03 is a 2000 Argentinian black comedy film directed by Cristian Bernard and Flavio Nardini. The film attained cult status in Argentina, but polarized critics.

== Cast ==
- Sergio Baldini as Dino
- Gerardo Chendo as Salvador
- Diego Mackenzie as Paco
- Sol Alac as Wanda Manera

== Sources ==
- Copertari, Gabriela (March 2006). "'De tal palo tal astilla': 76 89 03 y 'los hijos del Proceso'" ['Like father, like son': 76 89 03 and 'the children of the Process']. MLN (in Spanish). 121 (2): 439–461. doi:10.1353/mln.2006.0049. ProQuest 223322420.
- Holland, Jonathan (November 26, 2000). "76 89 03". Variety. Vol. 381, no. 2. p. 28. ProQuest 236310564. Archived from the original on July 12, 2026.
