= Rodolfo Halffter =

Spanish composer

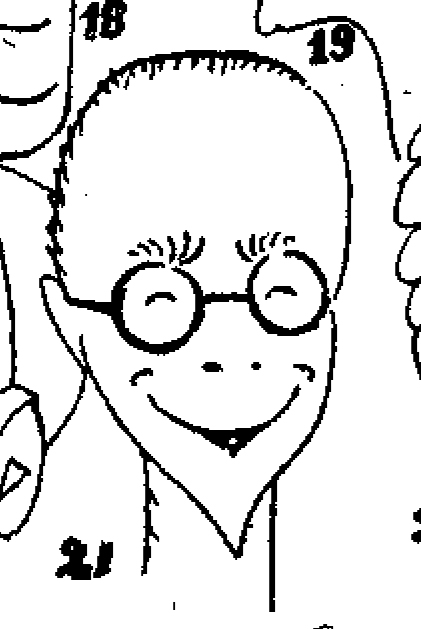
- Halffter caricatured by Bagaria in El Sol (1928)
- Born: 30 October 1900; Madrid, Kingdom of Spain
- Died: 14 October 1987 (aged 86); Mexico City, Mexico
- Occupations: Composer; music critic; professor

Rodolfo Halffter Escriche (30 October 1900 – 14 October 1987) was a Spanish composer, music critic, and professor with Mexican citizenship (from 1939). He wrote in a style always informed by his early engagement with the modernist aesthetics of Madrid's Grupo de los Ocho, finding inspiration in the music of Claude Debussy, Manuel de Falla, and Arnold Schoenberg.

Halffter came from a musical family. Though largely self-taught as a composer, he studied Schoenberg's Harmonielehre and was advised by Falla. His music has been compared to Domenico Scarlatti's in its neoclassicism and to Falla's in its mild polytonality.

Like others in his milieu, Halffter chose to leave Francoist Spain at the end of the Spanish Civil War. He emigrated to Mexico in 1939 and taught there for more than three decades, enjoying increasing recognition. Several notable composers are among his students. Starting in 1953, he became the first composer to use twelve-tone technique in Mexico.

Halffter returned to Spain beginning in the 1960s, where he also taught, and received its Premio Nacional de Música in 1986. He was also honored in Mexico, where he died. He wrote music in many genres and for many films.

== Biography ==
=== Early years ===
Born in Madrid to a family of musicians, Rodolfo Halffter was the older brother of composer-conductor Ernesto Halffter and uncle of composer Cristóbal Halffter. His father Ernest Halffter Hein was from Königsberg, Germany. His mother Rosario Escriche Erradón was of Catalan heritage and gave her children their first music lessons.

=== Spain ===
Halffter was largely self-taught as a composer and influenced by Debussy and Schoenberg, having read the latter's Harmonielehre. He was also advised by Manuel de Falla, whom he met through composer-critic Adolfo Salazar, (Note: By comparison, Halffter's younger brother Ernesto was also guided by Adolfo Salazar, who had taught and praised him as the successor to Manuel de Falla. (For this Salazar was accused of favoritism and opposed by Eduardo López-Chávarri.) By contrast, Roberto Gerhard found the autodidactic approach less fruitful and went to Vienna to study with Schoenberg in 1924. Likewise, Arturo Dúo Vital and Joaquín Rodrigo, among many international composers, went to study with Paul Dukas at the École Normale de Musique de Paris. Manuel Ponce reported that Dukas emphasized Bach, Mozart, and especially Beethoven but largely excluded opera despite some awe of Wagner. Dukas rejected "ignorant" music no matter its innovations, Ponce wrote, and insisted on counterpoint and economy of means.) and whose music then owed much to Igor Stravinsky's neoclassical style. (Note: Musicians after World War I preferred Stravinsky to "Debussyan softness", Rodrigo recalled in 1949. Ponce disparaged some 1920s composers as "Stravinskyists incapable of harmonizing a chorale".) Halffter also met artists like Salvador Dalí and Federico García Lorca at the Residencia de Estudiantes, and he set the poems of Rafael Alberti to music in Marinero en tierra (1925). Halffter became counted among the composers of the 1930s Grupo de los Ocho, or Grupo de Madrid. (Note: This group was influenced by Adolfo Salazar, who encouraged its members to innovate. Salazar introduced the group to the avant-garde music of the time, including that of Claude Debussy, Arnold Schoenberg, Maurice Ravel, and Béla Bartók.)

He worked first as a bank clerk and later as a music critic for Madrid's El Sol, El universo gráfico, and La Voz. In the last, he praised Joaquín Rodrigo's Zarabanda lejana y Villancico as "the exquisite product of a refined musician". He cofounded the Alianza de Intelectuales Antifascistas in 1936 and was also Head of the Department of Music at the Undersecretary of Propaganda in the Second Spanish Republic. His brother Ernesto, by contrast, supported Francisco Franco.

After the Spanish Civil War (1936–1939), Halffter chose to leave Francoist Spain for Mexico, as only Mexico and the Soviet Union had supported the Republican faction. He was among many Spanish Republican exiles who did so, including Falla, Salazar, Rosa García Ascot, Jesús Bal y Gay, and María Teresa Prieto.

=== Mexico ===
Halffter arrived in Mexico in 1939, where he was welcomed by Carlos Chávez and Blas Galindo in Mexico City. He first taught at the Escuela Superior de Música (1939–1940) and then at the Conservatorio Nacional de Música for 30 years. Joaquín Gutiérrez Heras, Federico Ibarra Groth, Mario Lavista, and Rocío Sanz Quirós studied music with Galindo and Halffter here before continuing their education at major institutions in Europe or the United States.

In 1946, he became editor of Nuestra música and director of Ediciones Mexicanas de Música. The same year, violinist Samuel Dushkin gave the premieres of Halffter's Violin Concerto, helping to establish Halffter's growing international reputation. Halffter may have participated in the 1954 and 1957 Festivales de Música in Caracas, perhaps placing him in the company of Roque Cordero and René Leibowitz.

=== Later career ===
Halffter returned to Spain on many occasions after 1962. He taught in Granada and Santiago de Compostela and participated in music festivals. He published a catalogue of Chàvez's music in 1971 for the composer's seventieth birthday and updated it after Chàvez's death. Halffter died in Mexico City on October 14, 1987.

== Music ==
Halffter wrote the majority of his most important works while in the Grupo de los Ocho. They are typified by their mild polytonality, asymmetric rhythms, and clear melodic writing after Falla, and their neoclassical style has been compared to the musical idiom of Domenico Scarlatti. (Note: Falla, E. Halffter, and Rodrigo also sometimes wrote in a Scarlattian idiom. In fact, hemiola and Phrygian half cadences are common in both Baroque music and the music of Spain.)

Halffter began to use twelve-tone technique, as the first composer to do so in Mexico, in Tres hojas de album (1953). This was at a time when the technique was becoming mainstream and had already become respected as somewhat antifascist. He maintained the melodic orientation of his prior style.

== Reception ==
The Spanish government honored him with a concert in his later career, and he received further honors from the Real Academia de Bellas Artes de San Fernando and the Mexican Academia de Artes. In 1986, he was awarded Spain's highest award for composition, the Premio Nacional de Música. He has been remembered as a composer working in the style established by Falla and as the first composer of twelve-tone music in Mexico. Galindo honored him in music with Homenaje a Rodolfo Halffter (1989).

== Compositions ==
=== Ballet suites ===
- Don Lindo de Almería (José Bergamín), Op. 7b, from the ballet (1935)
- La madrugada del panadero (José Bergamín), Op. 12a, from the ballet-pantomime (1940)

=== Chamber ===
- Piezas for string quartet (1923)
- Giga for guitar, Op. 3 (1930)
- Divertimento from Don Lindo de Almería for mixed ensemble, Op. 7a (1935)
- Pastorale for violin and piano, Op. 18 (1940)
- String Quartet, Op. 24 (1957–1958)
- Cello Sonata, Op. 26 (1960)
- Three Movements for string quartet, Op. 28 (1962)
- Ocho Tientos for string quartet, Op. 35 (1973)

=== Films ===
- The Lady from Trévelez, dir. Edgar Neville (1936)
- La mujer y la guerra, dir. Mauricio A. Sollín (1938)
- Christopher Columbus, dir. José Díaz Morales (1943)
- Michael Strogoff, dir. Miguel M. Delgado (1944)
- Entre hermanos, dir. Ramón Peón (1945)
- Los olvidados, dir. Luis Buñuel (1945)
- Raíces, dir. Benito Alazraki (1955), in collaboration with Galindo, José Pablo Moncayo, and Guillermo Noriega

=== Orchestra ===
- Suite, Op. 1 (1924–1928)
- Preludio atonal, homenaje a Arbós (1933)
- Violin Concerto, Op. 11 (1940)
- Tres sonatas de Fray Antonio Soler (1951)
- Obertura festiva, Op. 21 (1952)
- Tripartita, Op. 25 (1959)
- Diferencias for orchestra, Op. 33 (1970)
- Dos ambientes sonoros, Op. 37 (1975–1979)

=== Piano ===
- Dos sonatas de El Escorial, Op. 2 (1928, after Antonio Soler)
- Para la tumba de Lenin (1937)
- Homenaje a Antonio Machado, Op. 13 (1944)
- Sonata No. 1, Op. 16 (1947)
- Sonata No. 2, Op. 20 (1951)
- Tres hojas de album, Op. 22 (1953)
- Sonata No. 3, Op. 30 (1967)
- Homenaje Arturo Rubinstein (Nocturno), Op. 36 (1973)

=== String orchestra ===
- Dos impromptus y divertimento (c. 1931)
- Tres piezas, Op. 23 (1954)
- Elegía en memoriam Carlos Chávez, Op. 41 (1978)

=== Vocal ===
- Marinero en tierra (Rafael Alberti) for voice and piano, Op. 27 (1925)
- La nuez (A. del Rio) for three-part children's chorus (1944)
- Dos sonetos (Juana Inés de la Cruz) for alto and piano, Op. 15 (1946)
- Tres epitafios (Miguel de Cervantes) for chorus, Op. 17 (1947–1953)
