= Aballay (film) =

2010 film

- Theatrical release poster
- Directed by: Fernando Spiner
- Screenplay by: Fernando Spiner
- Based on: The short story Aballay by Antonio Di Benedetto
- Produced by: Eduardo Carneros; Fernando Spiner
- Starring: Pablo Cedrón
- Cinematography: Claudio Beiza
- Release date: 19 November 2010
- Running time: 100 minutes
- Countries: Argentina; Spain
- Language: Spanish

Aballay (Spanish: Aballay, el hombre sin miedo) is a 2010 action drama film written and directed by Fernando Spiner. The film was selected as the Argentine entry for the Best Foreign Language Film at the 84th Academy Awards, but it did not make the final shortlist.

== Cast ==
- Pablo Cedrón as Aballay
- Nazareno Casero as Julián
- Claudio Rissi as El Muerto
- Mariana Anghileri as Juana
- Luis Ziembrowski as Torres
- Aníbal Guiser as Mercachifle
- Lautaro Delgado as Ángel
- Tobías Mitre as Julián Niño
- Horacio Fontova as Cordobés
- Gabriel Goity as Cura

== See also ==
- List of submissions to the 84th Academy Awards for Best Foreign Language Film
- List of Argentine submissions for the Academy Award for Best Foreign Language Film
