= José Olarra =

Argentine actor

José Olarra (born 1896–1948 in Bayonne, France) was an Argentine actor.

== Biography ==
Olarra starred in the acclaimed Silver Condor-winning 1943 film Juvenilia. Other notable films include Circus Cavalcade (1945), Vacations in the Other World (1942) and Cuando la primavera se equivoca (1944).

== Selected filmography ==
- When the Heart Sings (1941)
- Gold in the Hand (1943)
- The Circus Cavalcade (1945)
- A Story of the Nineties (1949)
