= Gustavo Pittaluga (composer) =

Spanish conductor and composer (1906–1975)

Pittaluga in 1952

Gustavo Pittaluga González del Campillo (February 8, 1906, Madrid — October 8, 1975, Madrid) was a Spanish composer and member of the Grupo de los Ocho.
