= Rodolfo González Pacheco =

Argentine writer, playwright and journalist (1882–1949)

Rodolfo González Pacheco (1882–1949) was an Argentine writer, playwright, orator, anarchistic journalist and activist. He was editor of the anarchist newspaper La Antorcha (The Torch) and founder of the Teatro de Ideas (Theatre of Ideas). He died on 5 July 1949.

== Activism ==
In 1906 he founded, along with Federico Gutierrez (an ex-police turned anarchist) the satirical newspaper La Mentira (The lie). In 1908 he founded Germinal, with Teodoro Antillí; both managed La Batalla in 1910. From these years onwards he was collaborator on La Protesta. In 1911 he published the newspaper Alberdicon Apolinario Barrera. That year he was imprisoned for a few months in the Ushuaia Jail.

Once freed he founded the newspaper Libre Palabra with Titio Livio Foppa and El Manifiesto with Antilli, in 1911. In that same year he left for Mexico to collaborate with the magonistas on the Mexican Revolution. He returned to Argentina in 1914. In 1917 he published La Obra (The Work), a newspaper of the anarchist group of the same name. In 1919 he published Carteles, a miscellaneous anthological collection and some short articles. This was his most famous work.

In 1920 he founded another anarchistic newspaper, El Libertario and then released La Antorcha (The Torch) the next year. This newspaper with debate, along with La Protesta. The activities of violent direct actions at times were supported and never condemned by Pacheco's newspaper while La Protesta had a different attitude, clearly opposed to the anarchist expropriators.

In this context, in 1926 was condemned to 6 months in prison for defending Kurt Wilckens, the instigator of what is known as the tragic Patagonia massacre. After the José Evaristo Uriburu coup he was imprisoned in the Villa Devoto Jail for 8 months. There he wrote the drama Juana y Juan.

He was an active participant in the campaign for the liberation of Sacco y Vanzetti and Simón Radowitzky. He was a lecturer and activist in Argentina, Uruguay, Paraguay, Chile, Mexico, Cuba and Spain, a country to which he travelled during the Spanish Civil War of 1936. There he headed the magazine Teatro Social (Social Theatre) and, along with William Bosquets, founded the village Theatre Company. In 1938 he published Carteles de España. He returned to Argentina after the republican defeat.

== Cultural and literary activities ==
In 1907 he published Rasgos, his first book, of prose and poetry. In 1916 he opened his work Las Víboras, and in 1917 Pablo Podesta presented his drama La Inundacion (The Flood). In 1920, the Muiño-Alippi company presented his workMagdalena. In 1921 his work Hijos del Pueblo premiered at the Boedo Theatre. In 1922 he presented El Sembrador and in 1924 Hermano Lobo (Brother Wolf). In July 1926 he premiered Natividad (Nativity).

On 3 June 1927 A Contramano was released and one year later El hombre de la plaza pública (The Man in the Public Square), both produced by Enrique Muiño. On 1 April 1929 he premiered El Grillo in Rosario, on 4 June 1931 Juan y Juana and in 1936 Compañeros (Companions), in Montevideo.

After returning from Spain, he presented Manos de luz (1940) and Cuando aqui habia reyes (When there were kings here) (1941). In collaboration with Peter E. Picco, he wrote the piece Nace un pueblo (A village is born), Juan de Dios, milico y paisano and others.

Gonzalez Pacheco was one of the pioneers of Argentine cinematography, collaborating with Hugo Mac Dougall in producing Tres hombres del rio (Three men from the river) directed by Mario Soffici, which earned the Condor Academic Prize from the Academy of Arts and Cinematography Sciences of Argentina for the best original presentation in 1943.

=== Anarchistic publications ===
- Carteles, Volumes I and II.
- Collaborations on anarchist newspapers (Germinal, La Mentira, La Protesta, La Batalla, La Antorcha, Campana Nueva, La Obra, Tribuna Proletaria). Short texts with sentimental, moralistic and incendiary content, and strong criticism.

=== Theatre ===
- Las víboras (1916). - The vipers
- La inundación - The flood
- Magdalena
- Hijos del pueblo - Children of the village
- El sembrador - The sower
- Hermano Lobo - Brother wolf
- Natividad - Nativity
- A Contramano - The wrong way
- Cuando aquí había reyes - When there were kings here
