= Salvador Bacarisse =

Spanish composer

Salvador Bacarisse Chinoria (12 September 1898 – 5 August 1963) was a Spanish composer.

Bacarisse was born in Madrid and studied music at the Real Conservatorio de Música there, as a student of Manuel Fernández Alberdi (piano) and Conrado del Campo (composition). He was a leading member of the Grupo de los Ocho (founded in the spirit of Les Six to combat musical conservatism) and helped to promote new music as the artistic director of Unión Radio until 1936. At the end of the Spanish Civil War in 1939, Bacarisse exiled himself to Paris after rejecting the Francoist State of Francisco Franco. From 1945 until his death, he worked for Radio-Télévision Française as a broadcaster of Spanish-language programmes.

Bacarisse composed for the piano, mixed chamber ensembles, operas including El tesoro de Boabdil which won a French radio award in 1958, and orchestral works including four piano concertos and a violin concerto. His most famous work today is the Concertino for Guitar and Orchestra in A minor, Op. 72, composed in 1952 in a neo-romantic style. It is known in a celebrated recording by Narciso Yepes.
