= Ernesto Halffter =

Spanish composer and conductor

Ernesto Halffter

Ernesto Halffter Escriche (16 January 1905 – 5 July 1989) was a Spanish composer and conductor. He was the brother of Rodolfo Halffter and part of the Grupo de los Ocho (English: Group of Eight), which formed a sub-set of the Generation of '27.

== Early years ==
Ernesto Halffter was the third son of Prussian jeweller Ernest Halffter Hein and his wife Rosario Escriche Erradón. He was the younger brother of composer Rodolfo Halffter and the uncle of composer Cristóbal Halffter.

Halffter was born in Madrid and studied at the Colegio Alemán de Madrid. He wrote his earliest composition at the age of six, and in 1922 his piano teacher Fernando Ember performed three pieces from Crepúsculos at the Ritz Hotel in Madrid. After meeting Manuel de Falla in 1923, Halffter sent Falla the score of his "Homenajes" trio for violin, cello and piano, which began a long relationship that included composition lessons from Falla.

== Career ==
Halffter's Sinfonietta is one of his earliest and best works; it shows the influence of Domenico Scarlatti. Later, he became more nationalistic with Rapsodia portuguesa for piano and orchestra, composed in 1938, during the Spanish Civil War. He wrote music for a dozen films. Perhaps the most noteworthy is Don Quixote de la Mancha, the 1947 film version of Miguel de Cervantes's classic novel. He also adapted and conducted the music for El amor brujo (1967), based on the ballet by Falla. It was directed by Francisco Rovira Beleta, was nominated for an Oscar and features guitarist Narciso Yepes.

In 1934 Halffter became director and conductor of the Seville Conservatory of Music but, being married to the Portuguese pianist Alice Câmara Santos, chose to live in Lisbon during this period up to 1954. His only pupil was the Finnish composer Ann-Elise Hannikainen, who also became his life companion during his later life.

When Falla died in 1946, he left his opera Atlántida incomplete; Ernesto Halffter was asked to complete it. It premiered in 1962, but Halffter later revised it. The second version was completed in 1976.

In 1974, the Dalí Theatre and Museum in Figueras, Spain, was opened. Halffter was a personal friend of Salvador Dalí, and was asked to write a piece of music to celebrate the event. In response he composed Homenaje a Salvador Dalí.

Halffter was awarded Spain's Premio Nacional de Música for composition in 1984. He died in Madrid.

== Compositions ==
- Deux esquisses symphoniques pour orchestre (La chanson du lanternier; Paysage mort) (1922–1925)
- Hommages: petite suite pour trio (1922)
- Sinfonietta (1925)
- Automne malade (poem by Apollinaire), 1925/1927, published in 1929 (voice and piano or orchestra)
- Dos canciones (1927)
- L'hiver de l'enfance (1928–34)
- Canciones del niño de cristal (1931–34)
- Canzone e pastorella for cello and piano (1934)
- Amanecer en los jardines de España (1937)
- Señora (1938)
- Rapsodia portuguesa for piano and orchestra (1939)
- Seis canciones portuguesas (1940–41)
- Canção do berço (1940–41)
- Canto inca (1944)
- Seguidilla caselera (1945)
- Canción de Dorotea (1947)
- Fantasía española for cello and piano (1952)
- Atlántida (completion of Falla's work: 1961; revision 1976)
- Canticum (1964)
- Psalmi (1967)
- Concerto for guitar and orchestra (1969)
- Madrigalesca for guitar (1969)
- Homenaje a Salvador Dalí for trumpets, percussion, tenor, piano and mixed choir (1974)
- Pregón (1974)
- Sonatina, one-act ballet (first performed in a version for piano solo, played by José Cubiles on 16 November 1927; then in a concert version for orchestra, 11 February 1928, and finally as a fully staged ballet, 18 June 1928)
