= Argentine Film Critics Association =

Organization of Argentine-based journalists and correspondents

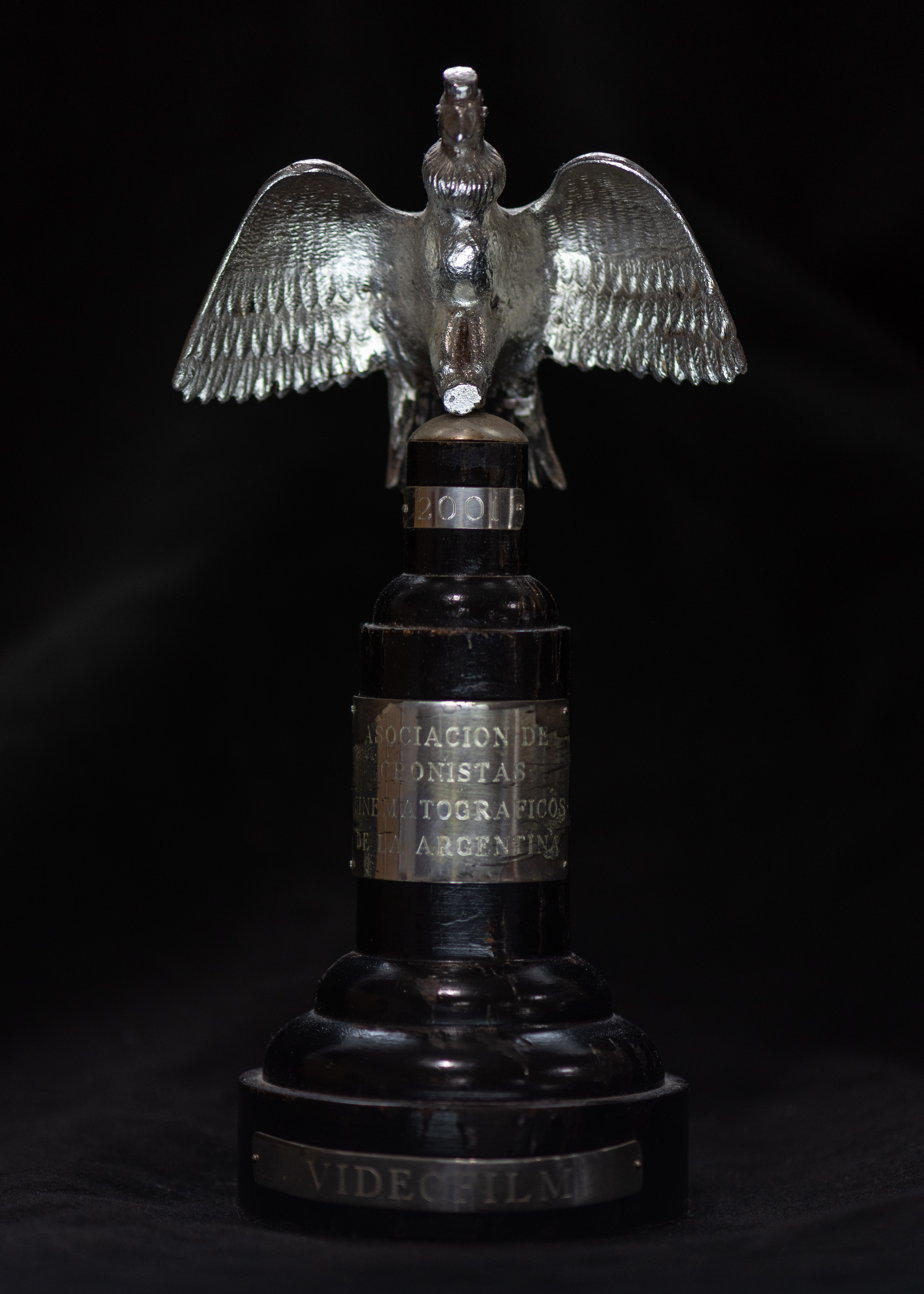
Silver Condor Award

The Argentine Film Critics Association (Spanish: Asociación de Cronistas Cinematográficos de la Argentina) is an organization of Argentine-based journalists and correspondents. The association presents the Silver Condor Awards (Premios Cóndor de Plata) honoring achievements in Argentine cinema. The awards are considered Argentina's equivalent of the Academy Awards.

The association was organized on July 10, 1942, and the annual awards have been given since 1943, with breaks in between. The Argentine Film Critics Association is a member of the International Federation of Film Critics, also known as FIPRESCI.

== Silver Condor ==
The Silver Condor (Cóndor de Plata) is awarded in various categories, the best Ibero-American film, and the best foreign film. A Special Condor is sometimes presented, and the Career Condor is awarded on a regular basis. According to the Internet Movie Database the association has given awards in the following years: 1943–1957, 1959–1974, 1981–1983, 1985–present.

As of March 2019, the association's Secretary General is Juan Pablo Russo.

== Awards ==
=== Current Award Categories ===
This is a list of the 24 prize categories presented at the last award ceremony, on 13 August 2018:

- Best Film
- Best Documentary
- Best First Film
- Best Ibero-American Film
- Best Foreign Film
- Best Director
- Best Actor
- Best Actress
- Best Supporting Actor
- Best Supporting Actress
- Best Newcomer (Male)
- Best Newcomer (Female)
- Best Original Screenplay
- Best Adapted Screenplay
- Best Cinematography
- Best Editing
- Best Music
- Best Sound
- Best Production Design
- Best Costume Design
- Makeup & Hairdressing
- Best Short Film
- Best Film on Video
- Career Award (includes journalists)

=== Former Award Categories ===
Prize categories that have been awarded in the past, but are currently not given, include:

- Best Animated Feature (2001 – 2008)
- Best Camera Operator
