= Obligado (surname) =

Obligado is a surname. Notable people with the surname include:

- Carlos Obligado (1889–1949), Argentine poet, critic and writer
- Clara Obligado (born 1950), Argentine writer
- María Obligado (1857–1938), Argentine painter
- Pastor Obligado (1818—1870), Argentine lawyer and lawmaker
- Rafael Obligado (1851—1920), Argentine poet and playwright

== See also ==
- Rafael Obligado, Buenos Aires, an Argentine town
  - Rafael Obligado Castle
- General Obligado Department, an Argentine district in Santa Fe Province
- Felipe Solo (Obligado) Peninsula, a peninsula in Antarctica
