= The Caranchos of Florida =

The Caranchos of Florida (Spanish:Los caranchos de la Florida) may refer to:

- The Caranchos of Florida (novel), a 1916 novel by Benito Lynch
- The Caranchos of Florida (film), a 1938 film adaptation directed by Alberto De Zavalia
