= The Englishman of the Bones =

The Englishman of the Bones (Spanish:El inglés de los güesos) may refer to:

- The Englishman of the Bones (novel), a 1924 Argentine novel by Benito Lynch
- The Englishman of the Bones (film), a 1940 Argentine film adaptation directed by Carlos Hugo Christensen
