= The Romance of a Gaucho =

The Romance of a Gaucho (Spanish:El romance de un gaucho) may refer to:

- The Romance of a Gaucho (novel), a 1930 Argentine novel by Benito Lynch
- The Romance of a Gaucho (film), a 1961 Argentine film adaptation directed by Rubén W. Cavalloti
