= Carlos Obligado =

Argentine poet and writer (1889–1949)

Carlos Obligado (21 May 1889, in Buenos Aires – 3 February 1949, in Buenos Aires) was an Argentine poet, crític and writer, best known for his patriotic lyrics to the song "Marcha de las Malvinas" (the Argentine name for the Falklands).

He was the son of poet Rafael Obligado (the author of "Santos Vega") and Isabel Gómez Langenheim. He pursued studies at the Colegio Nacional de Buenos Aires and took his doctorate at the Universidad Nacional de Buenos Aires in 1917.

His first book, Poemas, was published in 1920. He translated several French poets (Victor Hugo, Lamartine, Alfred de Musset and others). He was a literary critic, lecturer and university professor and served as the director of the Instituto de Literatura Argentina. In 1928 he traveled to Europe, visiting several countries. On his return to Argentina, he was named a dean of the Faculty of Philosophy and Letters. He was later named a member of the Academia Argentina de Letras and the Real Academia Española. In 1932, he produced a comprehensive translation of the poems of Edgar Allan Poe and Percy Shelley as well as a critical study of Leopoldo Lugones. The Spanish government awarded him the Civil Order of Alfonso X, the Wise in 1947. He was manager of the "Bibliotecas Populares" of the Ministry of Education when he died on February 3, 1949.

== Works ==
- Poemas (1920)
- Los Grandes Románticos (The Great Romantics, 1923)
- Las Cuevas del Fósil (Fossil Caves, 1927)
- Poemas de Edgar Allan Poe (1932)
- Temas Poéticos (Poetic Themes, 1936)
- Antología de Leopoldo Lugones (1942)
- Patria (Fatherland, 1943)
- Ausencia (Absence, 1945)
