= List of number-one hits of 1982 (Argentina) =

This is a list of the songs that reached number one in Argentina in 1982, according to Cashbox magazine with data provided by the Argentine Chamber of Phonograms and Videograms Producers.

Issue date	Song	Artist(s)
January 9	"El baile de los pajaritos"	Parchís
January 16	"El baile de los pajaritos"	Parchís
February 6	"Ana, Yo No Soy Tu Principe Azul"	Silvestre
March 6	"Ana, Yo No Soy Tu Principe Azul"	Silvestre
March 13	"Boby no me extrañes"	Gracielita
March 20	"Ana, Yo No Soy Tu Principe Azul"	Silvestre
April 3	"Envoltorio De Palabras"	Zum Zum
April 17	"Envoltorio De Palabras"	Zum Zum
April 24	"Envoltorio De Palabras"	Zum Zum
May 1	"Envoltorio De Palabras"	Zum Zum
May 8	"Marcha de las Malvinas"	Banda Original Columbia
May 15	"Marcha de las Malvinas"	Banda Original Columbia
May 22	"Marcha de las Malvinas"	Banda Original Columbia
May 29	"Marcha de las Malvinas"	Banda Original Columbia
June 19	"Marcha de las Malvinas"	Banda Original Columbia
June 26	"Marcha de las Malvinas"	Banda Original Columbia
July 10	"Puerto Pollensa"	Sandra Mihanovich
July 24	"Puerto Pollensa"	Sandra Mihanovich
August 21	"Lluvia"	Luis Ángel Márquez
August 28	"Lluvia"	Luis Ángel Márquez
September 4	"Lluvia"	Luis Ángel Márquez
September 11	"Dueño de nada"	José Luis Rodríguez
September 25	"Dueño de nada"	José Luis Rodríguez
October 23	"Yo tengo un amigo"	Lucecita Benítez
November 6	"Dueño de nada"	José Luis Rodríguez
November 13	"Dueño de nada"	José Luis Rodríguez
December 4	"Entre La Espada Y La Pared"	Dúo Manzanilla
December 11	"Entre La Espada Y La Pared"	Dúo Manzanilla
December 18	"Entre La Espada Y La Pared"	Dúo Manzanilla

== See also ==
- 1982 in music
