= 1930s in film =

The decade of the 1930s in film involved many significant films. The year 1939, in particular, was one of the biggest years (and is still considered one of the greatest years) in Hollywood with MGM's release of Gone with the Wind and The Wizard of Oz.

== Events ==
The 1930s was a decade of political turmoil and economic problems; the Great Depression affected the entire world, and Europe was dealing with both the fallout of World War I and the economic hardships of the time, both of which resulted in the rise of fascist political movements. The uncertainty resulted in the widespread popularity of fantastical escapist fiction. Swashbuckling adventures and the safe scares of the Universal Classic Monsters were highly successful.

Many full-length films were produced in the 1930s. Sound films ("talkies") were a global phenomenon by the early 1930s. Advances in color film included Technicolor and Kodachrome.

The year 1930 is the start of "the golden age of Hollywood", which lasted through at least the 1940s. The studio system was at its height in the 1930s, studios having great control over a film's creative decision. This included the creation of the Hays Code, which was the first large scale attempt at organized censorship of Hollywood films.

This was also a decade in which many memorable stars made their careers and saw their earliest starring roles.

=== Trends ===
Trends in the 1930s film industry include:

Remakes

Following the switch to talking movies c. 1926/1927, many classic films were remade in the 1930s (and later). These include Alice In Wonderland (1933), Cleopatra (1934), and The Prisoner of Zenda (1937).

Monsters

Among the numerous remakes and new films were the 'monster movies', with a wide spectrum of stereotypical monsters. Given that many of these films were produced by Universal, they are regarded as part of the 'Universal Horror' genre. The first of these films debuted in 1931, and consisted of Dracula, Frankenstein, plus Dr. Jekyll and Mr. Hyde, then a 1932 trio with The Mummy, Vampyr, and White Zombie, followed by a 1933 trio of King Kong, The Invisible Man, and Mystery of the Wax Museum. In 1935, appeared Werewolf of London and The Raven leading to 1939's The Hunchback of Notre Dame.

Sequels/spin-offs

Within five years of sound films, sequel films and spin-off plots appeared. Examples include The Son of Kong (same year, 1933), Bride of Frankenstein (1935), and Dracula's Daughter (1936).

Stars

The 1930s saw the rise of some of the best known performers in acting and film history. The aforementioned Dracula and Frankenstein films both launched the careers of Bela Lugosi and Boris Karloff, respectively; the two men would spend much of the decade starring in Universal Horror films. Actor Errol Flynn, best known for his role as Robin Hood, saw his first starring part in Captain Blood. The Marx Brothers, making their debut at the end of the silent era, rose to fame in the 1930s. The meteoric but short film career of Jean Harlow, The Blonde Bombshell, was completely contained in the 1930s. Fred Astaire, with his frequent partner Ginger Rogers, revolutionized film musicals. With charm and a "distinctive kind of nonmacho masculinity", Cary Grant became the decade's "epitome of masculine glamour". Other stars of this era included Clark Gable, Katharine Hepburn, child star Shirley Temple, Spencer Tracy, and Mae West.

A number of actors from the previous decade continued to be well regarded, such as Charlie Chaplin and Greta Garbo.

The Hays Code and the end of the Pre-Code era

In response to a number of scandals in the 1920s, the studios adopted a series of guidelines known as the "Hays Code", after its creator Will H. Hays. Hays was the head of the Motion Pictures Producers and Distributors Association, which would later be renamed as the Motion Picture Association of America in 1945. Starting in 1927, Hays began compiling a list of topics which he thought Hollywood should avoid. The code was revealed and implemented in 1930, but it was not until 1934, with the establishment of the Production Code Administration, that it was significantly enforced. Due to this delay in enforcement capability, the Pre-Code era of Hollywood is technically considered to last until 1934, despite the code itself being unveiled in 1930.

The specific date in which the Pre-Code era ends could be considered July 1, 1934. According to an amendment made on June 13, 1934, all films released after July 1 of that year had to receive a PCA certificate of approval. After this, the code was stringently enforced, though various forbidden subjects became less taboo and thus regulations regarding them were gradually relaxed. The code would remain in effect until 1968, when it was abandoned entirely. It was then replaced by the familiar letter rating system.

Non-Hollywood industries

The language barrier created by the transition to sound briefly disrupted Hollywood's international dominance, allowing several national film industries to consolidate and expand. In Europe, French, German and Italian productions flourished in the early sound era, while the decade also saw the rapid industrialization of Japanese cinema. In Latin America, the period gave rise to the Golden Age of Argentine cinema: the founding of studios Argentina Sono Film and Lumiton in 1933 launched an industrial film industry that grew from six features that year to over fifty annually by the end of the decade. Strongly rooted in popular culture—particularly tango music, radio, and popular theatre—Argentine cinema developed a distinctive melodramatic style and quickly conquered Spanish-language markets across Latin America. By 1939, Argentina had become the world's leading producer of films in Spanish, a position it would maintain until 1942. The decade also laid the groundwork for what would become the Golden Age of Mexican cinema in the following decade. Among the period's most distinctive productions was Leopoldo Torres Ríos's La vuelta al nido (1938), a psychological drama later recognized as a precursor of cinematic modernity for its intimate style and slow pace, which was rejected on release but reassessed decades later as one of the greatest Argentine films ever made. A widely celebrated title from the era, Prisioneros de la tierra (1939) has been considered the greatest Argentine film of all time on several occasions.

== Lists of films ==
- 1930 in film
- 1931 in film
- 1932 in film
- 1933 in film
- 1934 in film
- 1935 in film
- 1936 in film
- 1937 in film
- 1938 in film
- 1939 in film

== External lists ==
- Best/Worst 1930s Titles at IMDB
- List of 1930s films at IMDb
- List of 1930s deaths at IMDb
- List of 1930s births at IMDb
