= Hermanos (film) =

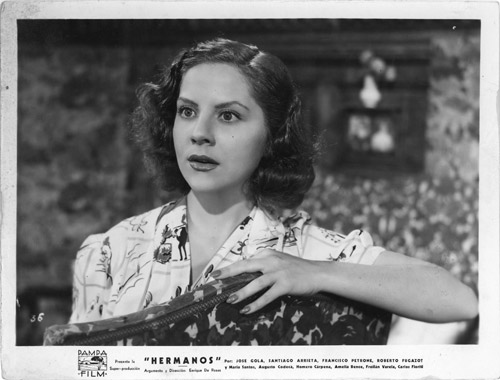
- Hermanos (1939)
- Directed by: Enrique de Rosas
- Written by: Enrique de Rosas
- Produced by: Enrique de Rosas
- Starring: Amelia Bence; José Gola
- Release date: 1939
- Running time: 79 minute
- Country: Argentina
- Language: Spanish

Hermanos is a 1939 Argentine drama film of the Golden Age of Argentine cinema directed by Enrique de Rosas. The film premiered in Buenos Aires and starred José Gola and Amelia Bence.

== Cast ==
- José Gola
- Francisco Petrone
- Santiago Arrieta
- Roberto Fugazot
- María Santos
- Augusto Codecá
- Amelia Bence
