= Ezeiza =

Ezeiza may refer to:

- Ezeiza, Buenos Aires, a city in Buenos Aires Province, Argentina
- Ezeiza Partido, in Buenos Aires Province, Argentina
- Ministro Pistarini International Airport, known as Ezeiza International Airport
- Gabino Ezeiza, Argentine musician
