= Gabino Ezeiza =

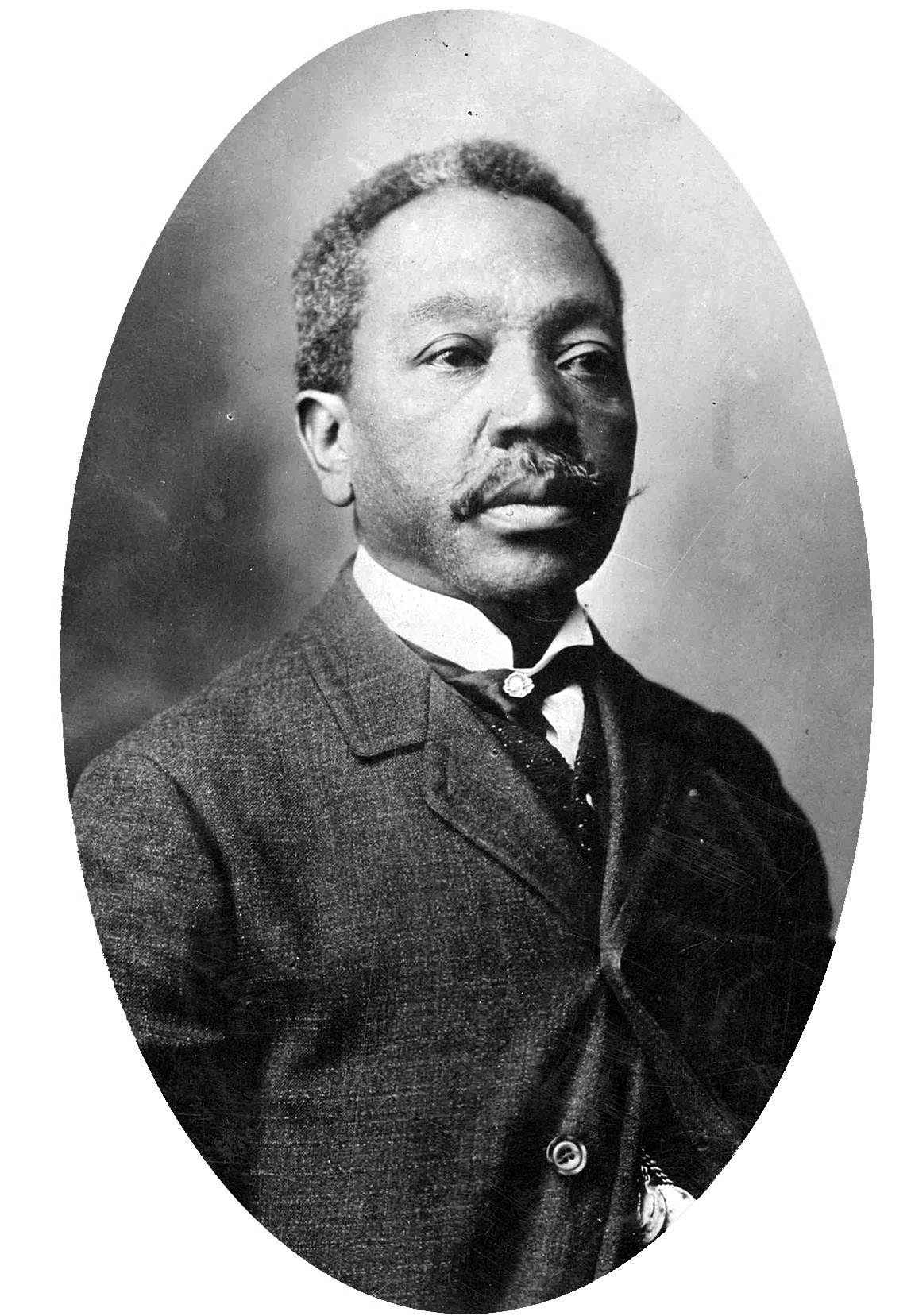

Background information
- Born: Gabino Ezeiza; February 3, 1858; Buenos Aires
- Died: October 12, 1916 (aged 58) Buenos Aires
- Genres: Payada
- Occupations: Musician, songwriter
- Instruments: Vocals, guitar

Gabino Ezeiza, nicknamed El Negro Ezeiza (February 3, 1858 – October 12, 1916), was an Argentine musician. Ezeiza was one of the greatest performers in the art of the payada. He became renowned, both in his native land and in Uruguay, after a memorable encounter with Oriental payador Juan de Nava, who carried at the time a certain halo of invincibility. This celebrated contest was held in the city of Paysandú on July 23, 1884, in front of one of the largest crowds ever to gather for a payada duel (in Argentina July 23 is established as the "Day of the Payador" in commemoration of this event).

Ezeiza was eventually proclaimed the winner with the improvisation of his famous "Saludo a Paysandú". A recording of this song is the only existing record of Ezeiza's voice. He went on to become one of the greatest payadores in the history of the art form (alongside, amongst others, Santos Vega). He was also well known for his sense of humor.

== Biography ==
Gabino Ezeiza was an Afro-Argentine born in the San Telmo barrio (a former slave neighborhood), and lived at a time when there were a considerable number of black Afro-descendants in the area of present-day Greater Buenos Aires. His teacher in the initiation of the payada, Pancho Luna, was also Afro-Argentine.

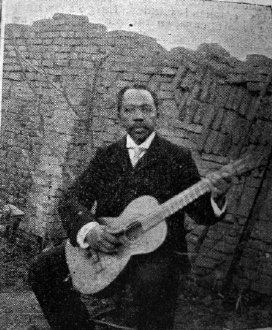
Ezeiza posing with his guitar for Caras y Caretas magazine in 1902

Ezeiza was one of the most famous payadores, both in his homeland and in Uruguay. His counterpoints became famous and the one held on July 23, 1884, at the Artigas Theater in Montevideo with the oriental singer Juan de Nava was particularly memorable, witnessed as it was by a large auditorium. In that meeting, Ezeiza improvised what would become the popular song Heroico Paysandú, with which he defeated Nava, thereby becoming one of the most important payadores in history. The day July 23 was declared "Payador's Day" throughout the territory of the Argentine Republic in honor of that historic counterpoint.

Ezeiza had memorable payadas with other rioplatense singers such as Nemesio Trejo (1880), Puanes e Hidalgo (unknown date), Pablo Vázquez (at Teatro Florida in Pergamino, 1894), Arturo de Nava (at Circo Anselmi), Cazón (both in 1896), Luis García (1900 in San Antonio de Areco).

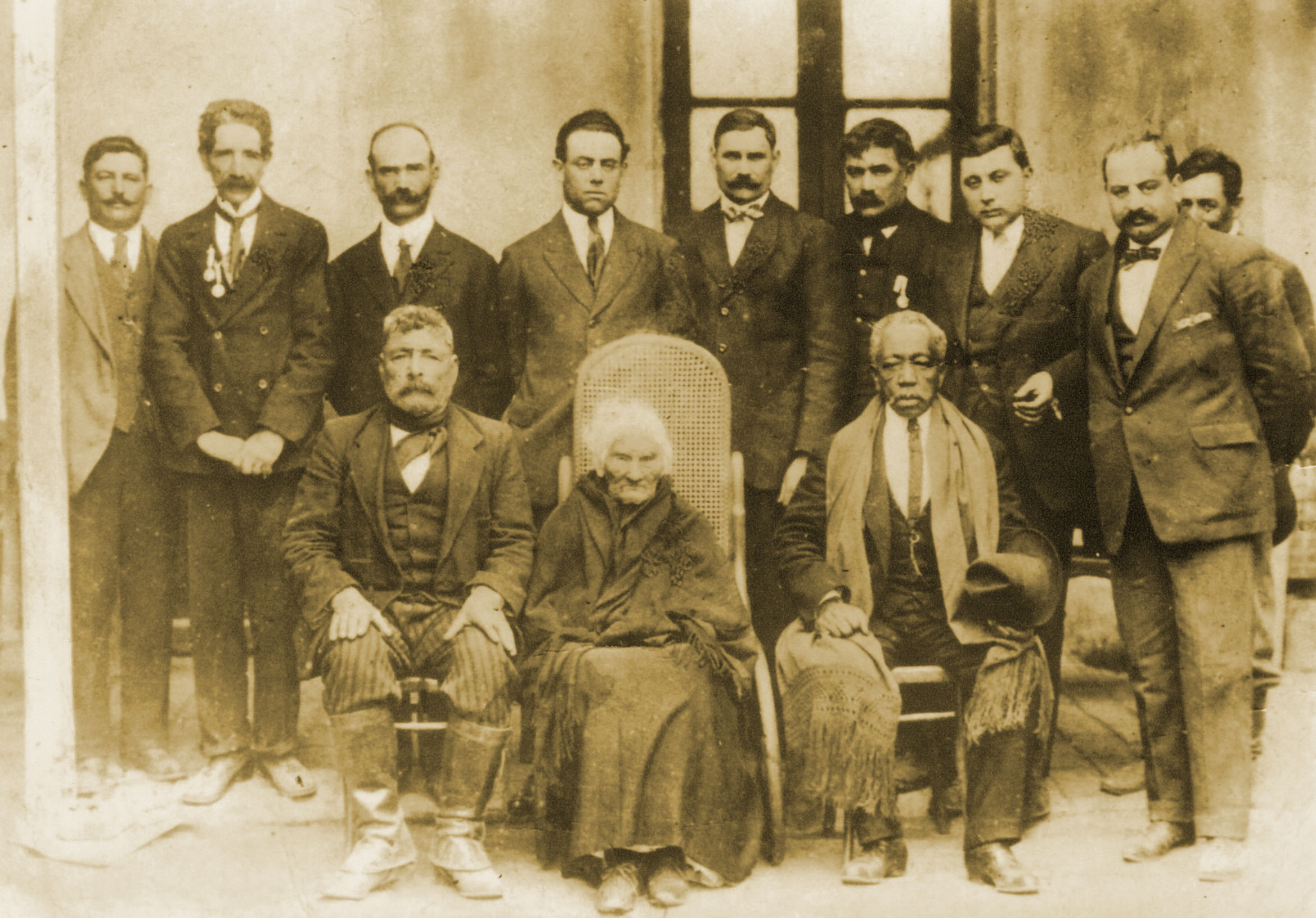
Ezeiza (first from right, below) posing with neighbors of Justiniano Posse in Córdoba Province, a few months before his death

Carlos Gardel and José Razzano met Ezeiza in the political committees, in particular, for his work in the committees of the Radical Civic Union adhering to the movement led at the time by Hipólito Yrigoyen, a story told in the film El último payador, whose script was written by tango lyricist Homero Manzi. He made friends at the popular Café de los Angelitos in Buenos Aires. Upon his death, the duo sang Heroico Paysandú in his tribute, which years later led to the Gardel album.

Ezeiza was also in jail for political reasons (according to the 1895 census data). After Argentina and Chile signed a peace treaty in May 1902 that established the present-day boundaries between both countries, Ezeiza toured on the south of Argentina. In 1905, he married Petrona del Carmen Peñaloza, whom he had met during his shows in San Nicolás de los Arroyos.

Ezeiza died in his house in Flores, Buenos Aires, on October 12, 1912. According to his doctor, the cause of death was endocarditis.

== Contribution to Argentine folklore ==
Cover to Cantares Criollos, a book that compiles songs by Gabino Ezeiza, published in 1886

There are those who consider that Ezeiza was the one who introduced the milonga rhythm to payada, and its popularity caused other payadores to spread it to other areas of Argentina, Uruguay, and Brazil (on all in the south of this country).

Ezeiza affirmed that the milonga (campera) came from the candombe, a style of music and dance that originated in Uruguay among the descendants of liberated African slaves.

In an interview to Argentine payador and journalist Nemesio Trejo, published in the newspaper La Opinión of Avellaneda on April 15, 1916, he recounts:

"In 1884 it was my first encounter with Gabino Ezeiza, the most famous of the Argentine bards, and that payada served to make a school. At that time it was sung by number, but Gabino introduced the milonga on that occasion in the tone Do Mayor" and added: "she is a villager (from the city environment) since she is the daughter of African Candombe, and tapping her forefingers on the edge of the table she began to hum" tunga...tatunga...tunga..." to demonstrate, phonetically, the link between this rhythm and Candombe."

Ezeiza considered that the milonga rhythm would have been an evolution, in classical guitar (named "creole guitar" in Argentina), of Afro-Argentine candombe carried out by Afro-Argentines in the Argentine Pampas.
