= Milonga (music) =

Musical genre originating in South America

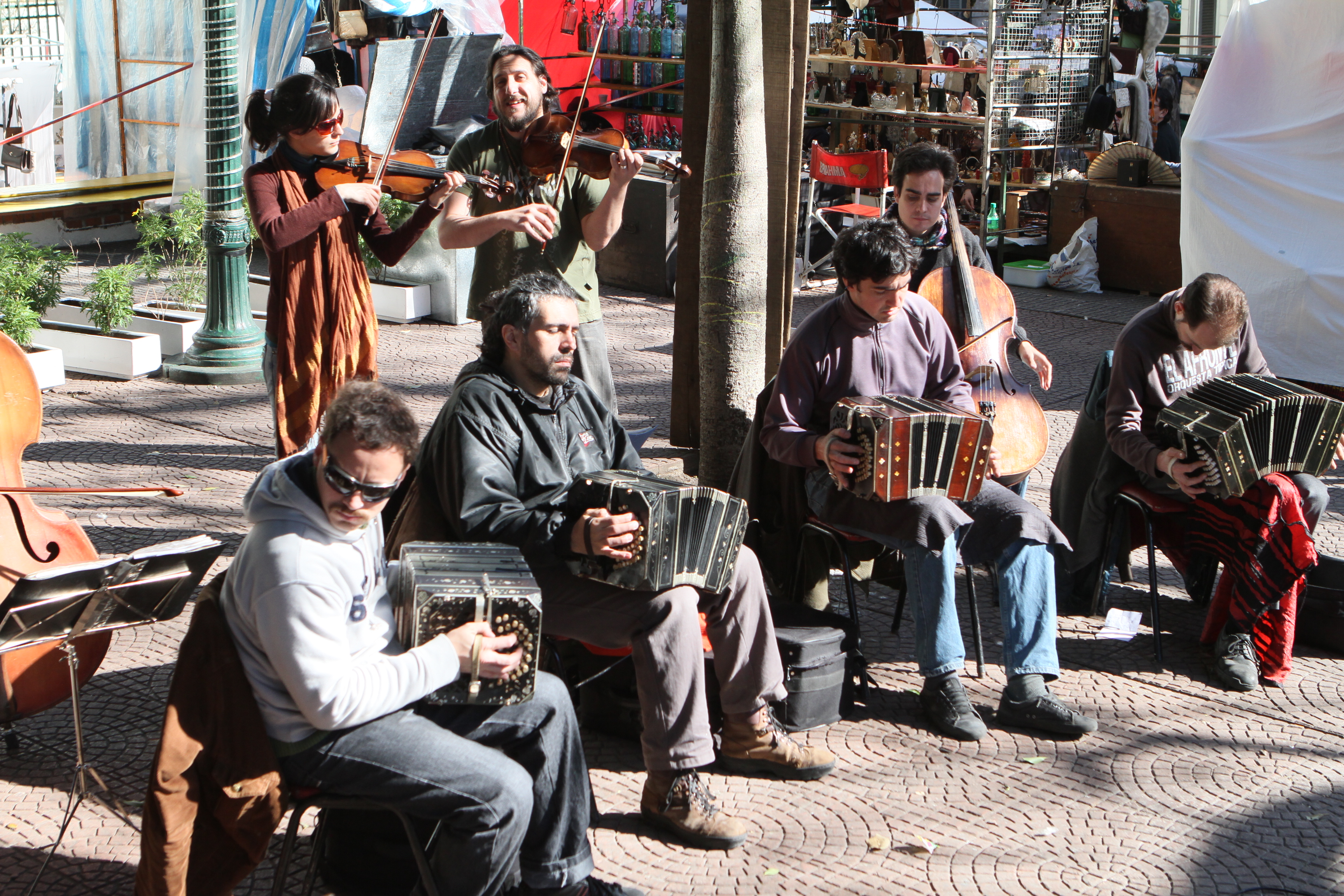
- Milonga group in Buenos Aires
- Stylistic origins: Habanera; Candombe; Payada; Guajira
- Cultural origins: 19th century, Río de la Plata region
- Typical instruments: Guitar; Voice; Bandoneon; Violin; Piano; Double bass; Harp
- Derivative forms: Tango

Subgenres
- Milonga candombe

Fusion genres
- Tango milonga

Other topics
- Gaucho culture; Afro-Argentine; Río de la Plata

Milonga is a musical genre that originated in the Río de la Plata areas of Argentina, Uruguay, and the Brazilian state of Rio Grande do Sul. It is considered a precursor of the tango, and may or may not be vocal.

"Milonga is an excited habanera." The original habanera divided into four pulses, in a standard two-four where every note was stressed. In becoming milonga, though, all four notes turned strong, as tempo was doubled. The strength of the first beat weakened the fourth giving an almost waltz-like feel to milonga: one-two-three (four), one-two-three (four). Habanera is a slower, more explicit sounding one, two, three-four. At least one modern tango pianist believes the polka influenced the speeding up of the milonga. According to milonga composer and one of the most famous payadores of his time, Gabino Ezeiza, the milonga derives from various African rhythms such as candombe, and Argentine milonga was particularly popular among Afro-Argentines in Buenos Aires at the turn of the 20th century.

Over time, dance steps and other musical influences were added, eventually contributing to the creation of tango.

== Notable artists ==
Artists known for their milonga compositions and interpretations include Roberto Firpo, Angel D'Agostino, Pedro Maffia, Pedro Laurenz, Ángel Villoldo, Francisco Canaro, Rodolfo Biagi, Jorge Drexler, Juan d'Arienzo, Edgardo Donato, Gabino Ezeiza, Aníbal Troilo, Lucio Demare, Domingo Federico, Angel Vargas, Mariano Mores, Alfredo Zitarrosa, Francisco Lomuto, Astor Piazzolla and Carlos Di Sarli. These artists are from the early years and the Golden era of tango. Los Moonlights released a song entitled "Milonga de pelo largo" (Milonga of long hair) on their debut LP, Moonlights.

In Rio Grande do Sul, milonga is an important regional genre and it is part of the repertoire of many gaucho musical groups and interpreters, not to be confused with the Argentinean gauchos. It also continues to influence other genres of the modern gaucho music. José Cláudio Machado's "Milonga Abaixo de Mau Tempo", Renato Borghetti's "Milonga para as Missões" and Jayme Caetano Braun's "Bochincho" are examples of the traditional rio-grandense form of milonga, while Vitor Ramil's "Ramilonga" and Bebeto Alves's "Milonga Orientao" are examples of modern form of this genre.

Argentine composer and pianist Fernando Otero has based many of his orchestral and chamber works on this rhythm, creating compositions for Symphonic Orchestra, String Quartet and Jazz Combos.

Kevin Johansen is a modern Argentine rock artist who has a number of songs that combine folkloric and pop music with a milonga rhythm.

== Selected recordings ==
- Milonga Negra (Mercedes Simone, 1937)
- Silueta porteña (Juan D'Arienzo, 1936)
- Cacareando (Orquesta Típica Victor, 1933)
- La milonga de Buenos Aires (Francisco Canaro, 1939)

== See also ==
- Argentine tango
- Chamarrita
- Milonga (dance event)
- Tango (dance)
- Tango music
- Vals
