= José Razzano =

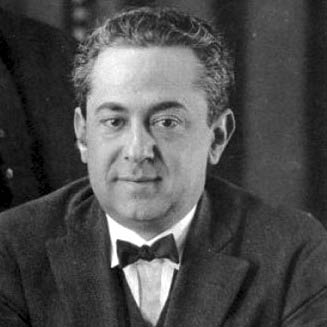

Background information
- Also known as: El Oriental
- Born: José Francisco Razzano; Montevideo
- Died: April 30, 1960 (aged 73) Buenos Aires
- Genres: Tango
- Occupations: Guitarist, Composer, Singer
- Instrument: Classical guitar

José Francisco Razzano (1887–1960) was an Uruguayan singer and composer. He joined singer Carlos Gardel on a duo until 1925 when Razzano left due to vocal cord problems. Since then, Razzano became Gardel's manager until 1933.

== Biography ==
José Francisco Razzano born in Montevideo, near Plaza Independencia, on February 25, 1887. When his father died two years later, his mother moved to Buenos Aires, establishing in Balvanera district.

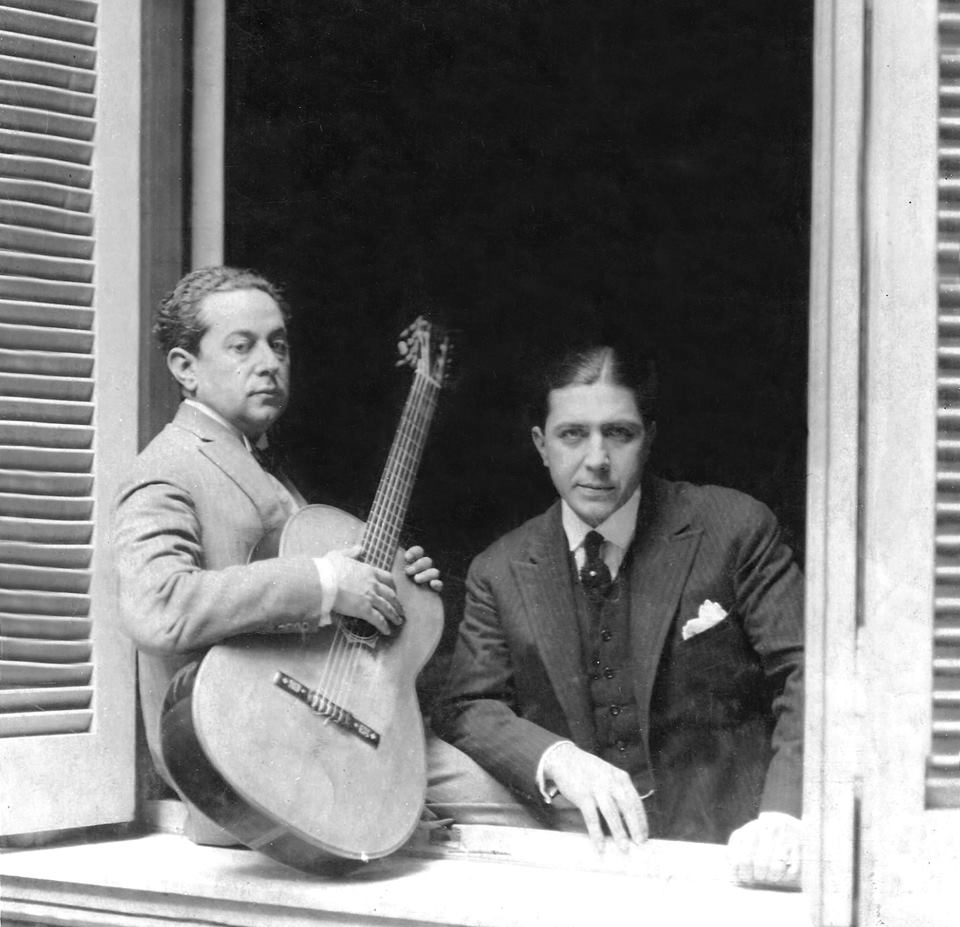
Razzano (with guitar) formed a memorable team with Carlos Gardel. Here both pictured in 1926

In 1903, he performed in the National Drama Company led by Adriana Cornaro as a singer. He also performed on Justicia Humana by Agustín Fontanella impersonating "Juancho" and singing payada with Damián Méndez in Calandria written by Martiniano Leguizamón. He also formed part of gaucho centre Los Pampeanos.

Razzano's prominent fame resulted in the signing of his first contract with Argentine filial of Victor Talking Machine Company in 1912. Razzano recorded 10 songs. La China Fiera (singing in a duo with Francisco Martino) was the first of them. A couple of years later, Razzano signed a new contract with local label "Era".

He then joined other artists such as Francisco Martino, Carlos Gardel and Raúl Salinas. The Razzano-Gardel duo signed a contract with Austro-Hungarian entrepreneur Max Glücksmann. At the beginning of their collaboration, both artists signed as authors of all the compositions, although some versions refuted this statement, because there were not authors societies that could confirm that.

The popularity of the Gardel-Razzano duo was in crescendo, touring on Uruguay, Brazil, Chile and Spain until 1925 when Razzano left his singing career due to throat problems. In October, Gardel designated Razzano as administrator of his properties.
