= Jaime Caetano Braun =

Brazilian folk musician, poet and composer

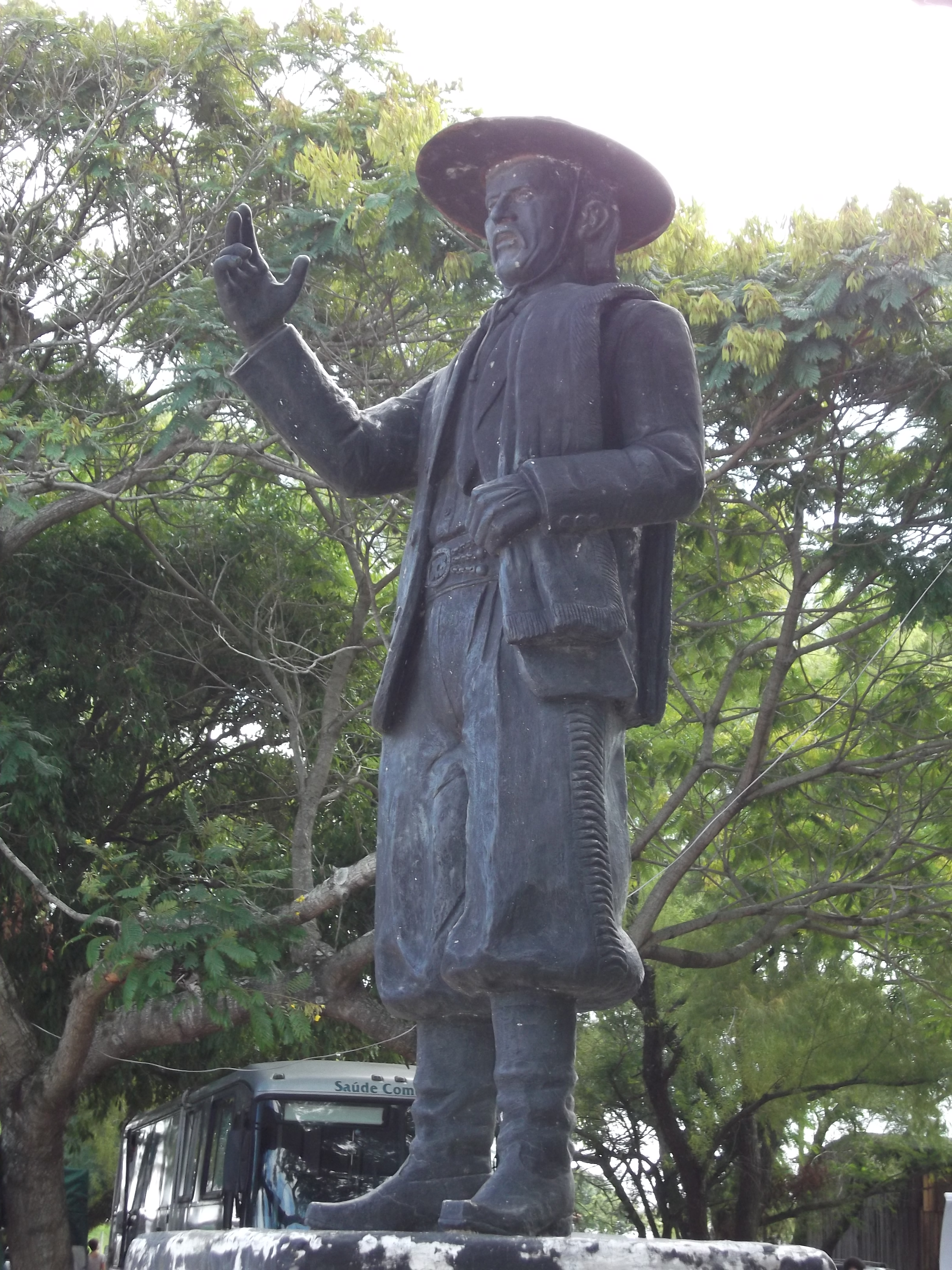
Jayme Caetano Braun statue, Parque Maurício Sirotski Sobrinho, Porto Alegre, Brasil

Jayme Guilherme Caetano Braun (Bossoroca, January 30, 1924 – Porto Alegre, July 8, 1999) was a Brazilian folk musician, poet and composer.

Jayme was the most famous payador of Rio Grande do Sul and had great participation in the dissemination of the gaúcho culture in Brazil and the world. Between 1973 and 1988, he had a weekly radio program on Radio Guaíba.

There is a statue of him Porto Alegre.

== Bibliography ==
- 1954 - Galpão de Estância
- 1958 - De Fogão em Fogão
- 1965 - Potreiro de Guaxos
- 1966 - Bota de Garrão
- 1966 - Brasil Grande do Sul
- 1966 - Passagens Perdidas
- 1990 - Payador e Troveiro
- 1996 - 50 Anos de Poesia

== Discography ==
- 1993 - Paisagens Perdidas
- 1993 - Poemas Gaúchos
