= José Gola =

Argentine actor (1904–1939)

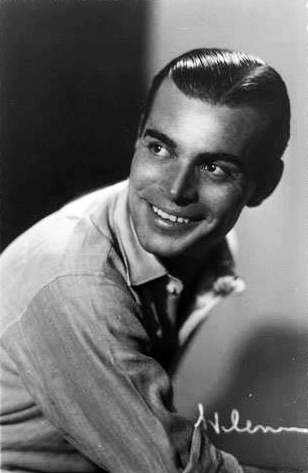
Portrait of José Gola in the 1930s.

José Gola (February 7, 1904 – April 27, 1939, in Buenos Aires) was an Argentine film actor, notable for his work during the early years of the Golden Age of Argentine cinema.

Born in La Plata, Buenos Aires Province, Argentina, Gola began acting for film in the 1934 film Mañana es domingo. He began appearing in popular films such as Puente Alsina (1935) and La muchachada de a bordo in 1936 and Mateo in 1937. In 1938 he appeared in the film The Caranchos of Florida in which he played a significant lead role. He died appear in 1939's Hermanos but his last film was Frente a la vida before he died suddenly of peritonitis.

He was an Argentine actors in the 1930s and had the potential to become renown in the Cinema of Argentina.

He died on April 27, 1939, in Buenos Aires.

== Filmography ==
- Frente a la vida (1939)
- Hermanos (1939)
- The Caranchos of Florida (1938)
- La Estancia de gaucho Cruz (1938)
- Nace un amor (1938)
- La Vuelta al nido (1938) .... Enrique Núñez
- El Pobre Pérez (1937)
- Mateo (1937)
- Fuera de la ley (1937) .... Juan Robles
- Palermo (1937)
- Puerto nuevo (1936)
- La muchachada de a bordo (1936)
- Puente Alsina (1935)
- La barra mendocina (1935)
- Por buen camino (1935)
- Mañana es domingo (1934) .... Julio
