= La vuelta al nido =

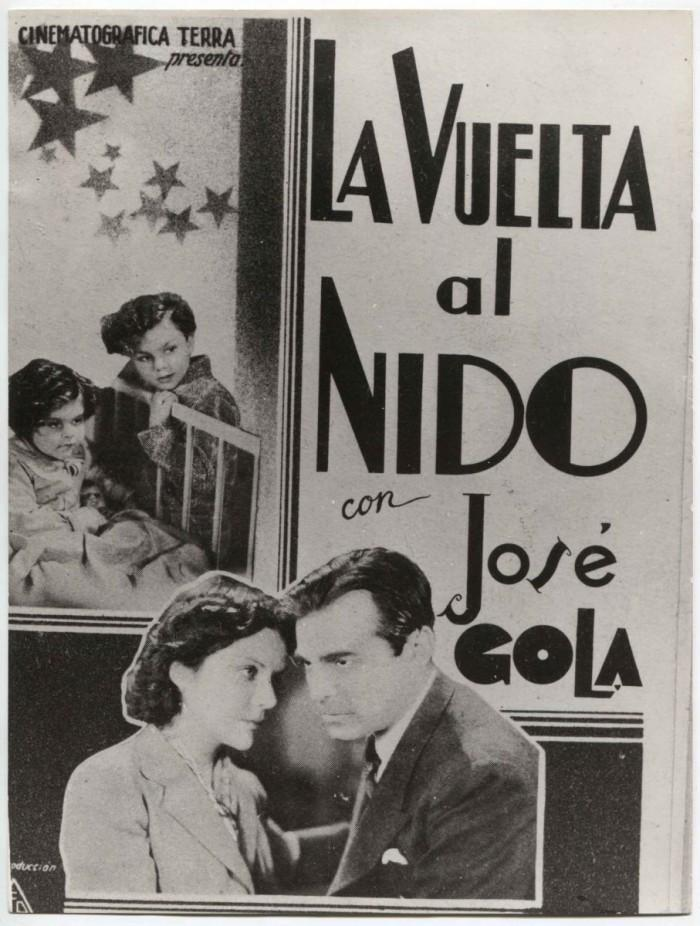
- Theatrical release poster
- Directed by: Leopoldo Torres Ríos
- Written by: Leopoldo Torres Ríos
- Produced by: A. Z. Wilson
- Starring: José Gola; Amelia Bence
- Cinematography: Carlos Torres Ríos
- Music by: Eugenio De Briganti; Abrain De Briganti
- Production company: Estudios E.F.A. (Establecimientos Filmadores Argentinos)
- Distributed by: Cinematográfica Terra
- Release date: 4 May 1938
- Running time: 77 minutes
- Country: Argentina
- Language: Spanish

La vuelta al nido (English: Return to the Nest) is a 1938 Argentine psychological drama film written and directed by Leopoldo Torres Ríos and starring José Gola and Amelia Bence. It was the first major work of Torres Ríos and the first production of Estudios E.F.A. (Establecimientos Filmadores Argentinos), founded by producers Adolfo Z. Wilson and Julio Joly in partnership with exhibitor Clemente Lococo. However, the film remained shelved for nine months due to rejection by exhibitors and critics who deemed it "uncommercial," and E.F.A. even released Adiós Buenos Aires—also directed by Torres Ríos and filmed later—before La vuelta al nido. Unlike the more commercially successful films that dominated the early years of the Golden Age of Argentine cinema, La vuelta al nido was distinguished by its poetic and intimate style, focusing on the psychology of its characters over action or dialogue.

After several months of difficulties and debates about its commercial value, the film finally premiered on 4 May 1938 at the Cine Monumental in Buenos Aires. It was a resounding commercial and critical failure due to its slow pace, with the notable exception of the influential critic Calki of El Mundo, whose backing proved fundamental to the film's eventual release and who devoted several columns to praising it as the inauguration of a new style within Argentine cinema. Torres Ríos was accused of "dirtying the celluloid" and took the failure very badly; the blow affected his reputation for a couple of years, and the films he made in the following period were markedly commercial in style.

The film began to be reassessed in the 1950s and 1960s, championed by the young critics of the Cine Club Núcleo and the journal Tiempo de Cine, who recognized it as a precursor of the cinema of the so-called "generation of the '60s". Today it is recognized as a classic of Argentine cinema, the masterpiece of Torres Ríos, and a film ahead of its time, with an experimental style that anticipates auteur cinema and cinematic modernity. It has been considered one of the greatest Argentine films of all time on several occasions.

== Plot ==
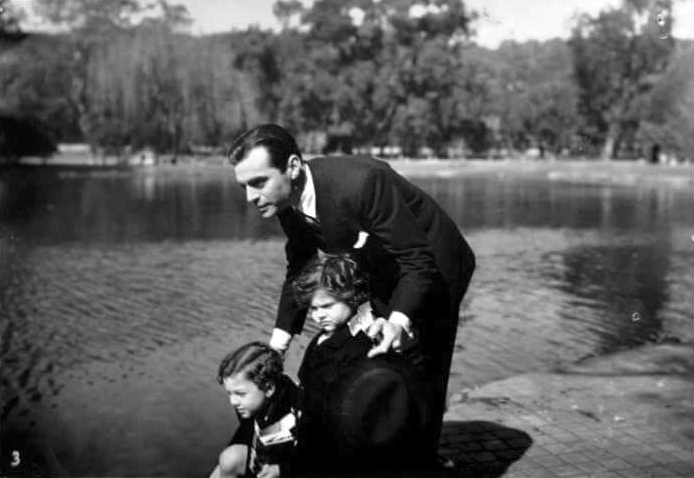
José Gola as Enrique alongside his children in the film, played by Araceli Fernández and "Cielito" González.

Enrique Núñez, a middle-class man from Buenos Aires, strolls with his young children in the park and the Buenos Aires Zoo, where they observe the caged animals. Back home, he bathes his son while his wife puts the girl to bed. Enrique is attentive and affectionate as a father, but treats his wife harshly: he scolds her for leaving doors open, for not keeping things in their proper place, for forgetting the pot on the stove, and for an alleged lack of discipline with the children. His wife, by contrast, is patient and loving, and the children, well-mannered, pray aloud before sleeping. The couple also has a minor argument in which Enrique celebrates his son's interest in football and dismisses his wife's concern about the boy's academic neglect, arguing that reading weakens the muscles.

After dinner, with the children in bed, Enrique sits down to listen to music and read the newspaper. His wife combs her hair, tidies herself up, and approaches him seeking attention: she sits on his lap, shares in the reading, caresses him, and kisses his neck. Enrique, initially indifferent, eventually smiles and kisses her back. She tells him that when they were courting he did not read so much, to which he replies that newspapers were less interesting back then, before abruptly breaking off the conversation when he thinks he hears one of the children coughing. Returning to his seat, Enrique looks at their wedding photograph and recalls the date of their marriage and the happy moments the couple once shared. His wife sews in silence while he watches her with unease. A shot shows him kneeling sorrowfully before the bed, resting his head on the mattress, which she strokes.

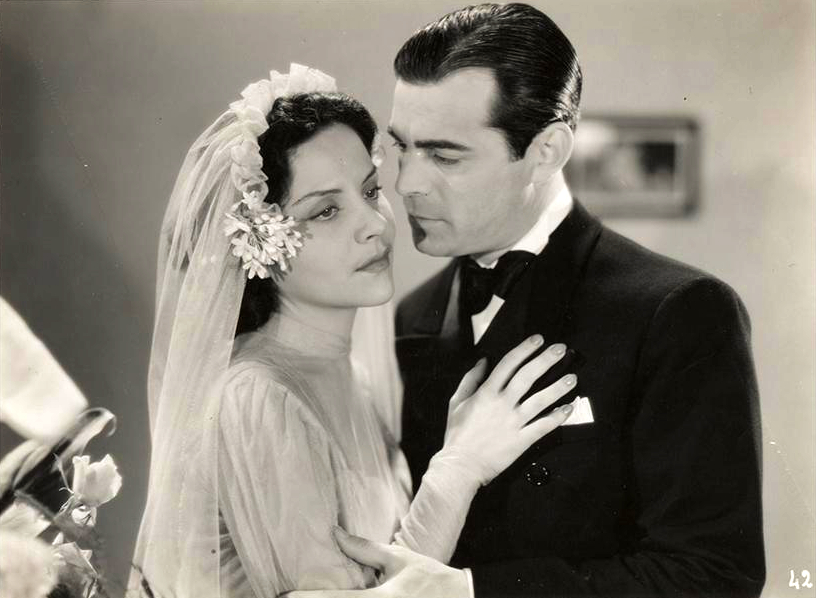
José Gola and Amelia Bence in one of the film's flashbacks.

Following images of the Canto al Trabajo (Song to Labour) monument by Rogelio Yrurtia—depicting chained figures dragging a stone—Enrique is seen at his job as an accountant. He works quietly and absently while his more undisciplined colleagues chat and argue about the lottery. His boss points out that he has been making mistakes and threatens more severe measures if it continues. Enrique maintains a cordial relationship with his office colleague Luisita, sweet and attentive, and agrees to buy a pair of shoes for his wife during the break, since she and Luisita share the same shoe size.

His boss calls him in to deliver a letter that has arrived in his name, despite employees being forbidden to receive correspondence at that address. It is an anonymous note informing him that his wife is being unfaithful and that every afternoon, while taking the children to the park, she meets a lover. Enrique falls into a state of profound anguish that follows him home as he watches his wife. In the newspaper he reads about a man who kills his wife in a fit of jealous rage. He approaches her, embraces and kisses her, but cannot conceal his horror.

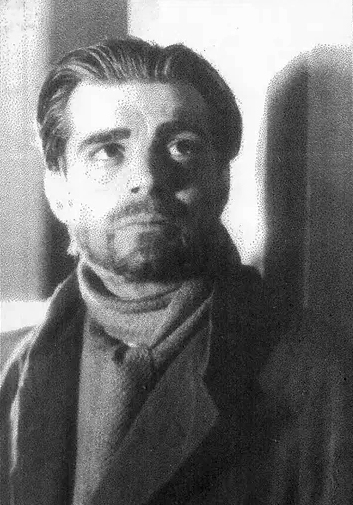
José Gola, aged, in an imagined scene near the end of the film.

At a nightclub, he drinks in silence while people dance. There he runs into an old friend, Juan, and catches up with him. Juan asks whether he has married, and Enrique returns the question by asking whether Juan is still a bachelor. Juan admits that most of his conquests are married women and fears that if he marries he will end up with such a woman himself; though he acknowledges that he sometimes longs for the stability of Enrique's domestic life. Enrique's anguish intensifies as the venue plays a tango about heartbreak and disillusionment. Amid his desolation, a woman approaches and tries to attract his attention with a smile. Meanwhile, his wife sleeps alone at home, beside the empty space in the bed.

At work, Enrique is withdrawn and distracted. His boss reproaches him again for his inattentiveness and new errors. At his limit, Enrique tells him he is bent on tormenting him and will not tolerate his bullying, threatening to break his nose. Although Luisita approaches to congratulate him, he leaves the office in silence. His colleagues, who also dislike the boss, jokingly discuss whether he will decide to fire Enrique, noting that he has two children and has been in that thankless job for ten years.

Enrique goes to the park and spies from behind a tree as his wife strolls with the children. In a daydream, he imagines newspaper headlines announcing that he has murdered her in a public park; he sees himself imprisoned and visited by Luisita, who looks after his children and tells him how they are doing: the younger one has taken an interest in studying and wants to become a doctor. Enrique laments that, by the time he leaves prison, his son will already be a grown man and that he will never be able to recover their bond. The daydream ends with him, aged and bearded, just released, returning home to find an adult son who looks at him with cold rejection, before wandering alone in the street.

Back in reality, Enrique remains behind the tree with a revolver in his hand. He then observes that his wife is not meeting any man, and she leaves the park with the children. That night, after putting the children to bed, she approaches him and, moved by his anguish, confesses that she was the one who sent the anonymous letter: she wrote it to get his attention, overwhelmed by the indifference with which he faces the pressures of daily life. Enrique smiles, his anguish lifts, and he embraces and kisses her passionately.

== Cast ==
- José Gola as Enrique
- Amelia Bence as his wife
- Araceli Fernández as their daughter
- Mario "Cielito" González as their son
- Julio Renato as the manager
- Anita Jordán as Luisita
- Vicente Forastieri as Pedro
- Mario Mario as an employee
- Pascual Pellicciotta]] as Juan
- Ernesto Villegas as an employee
- Roberto F. Torres as the judge
- Enrique del Cerro as Dr. Núñez
- Roberto Páez as the singer

== Themes and style ==
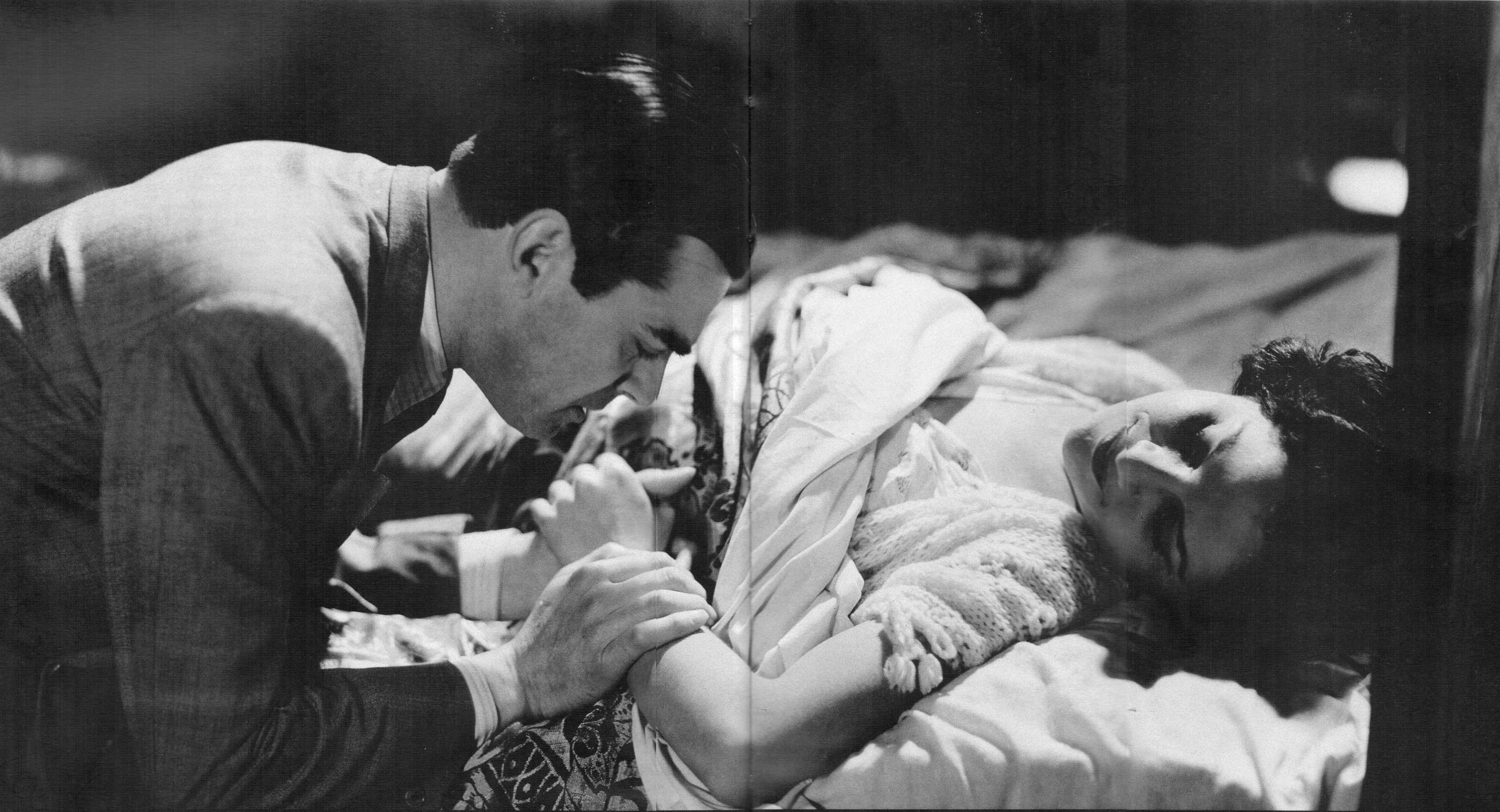
José Gola and Amelia Bence in a scene from the film.

La vuelta al nido is considered an anomaly among the productions of the Golden Age of Argentine cinema for its intimate style and experimentation with film language, in which the mise-en-scène is placed at the service of the characters' emotions rather than the written plot. Several authors have noted that the film contains elements that anticipate cinematic modernity by decades. On a formal level, it has been described as a work that reflects the transition from silent film to sound film. The film shows influences from German silent cinema, particularly the so-called "chamber film" or Kammerspielfilm, and from filmmakers of the silent era such as King Vidor, with references to his film The Crowd (1928). Against the commercial and narrative imperatives governing all Argentine cinema of the period, the film is characterized by its lack of external "action" and its slow pace, reflecting the inner world and psychology of its characters. Torres Ríos himself wrote that he was attempting "to focus on a situation and study it inwardly, taking advantage of everything that the decalogue of the good scriptwriter rejects. Namely: the absence of action and wasting time on superfluous things." The result is a naturalistic film with sparse dialogue that relied heavily on the restrained performances of José Gola and Amelia Bence, on meticulous attention to apparently insignificant everyday details that carry symbolic and emotional weight, and on the use of long scenes and takes, as well as flashbacks and imagined flash-forwards. According to Puerto Rican academic Paul A. Schroeder Rodríguez, Torres Ríos employs "the use of free indirect style to represent the distorted perspective of his protagonist."

Of all my output, the film I love the most is La vuelta al nido because in directing it I felt, for the first time, that the moment of inspiration is in cinema as important as it is in writing a poem. Making that film I believed I was discovering cinema, that everything done until then, with few exceptions... was false.

— Leopoldo Torres Ríos.

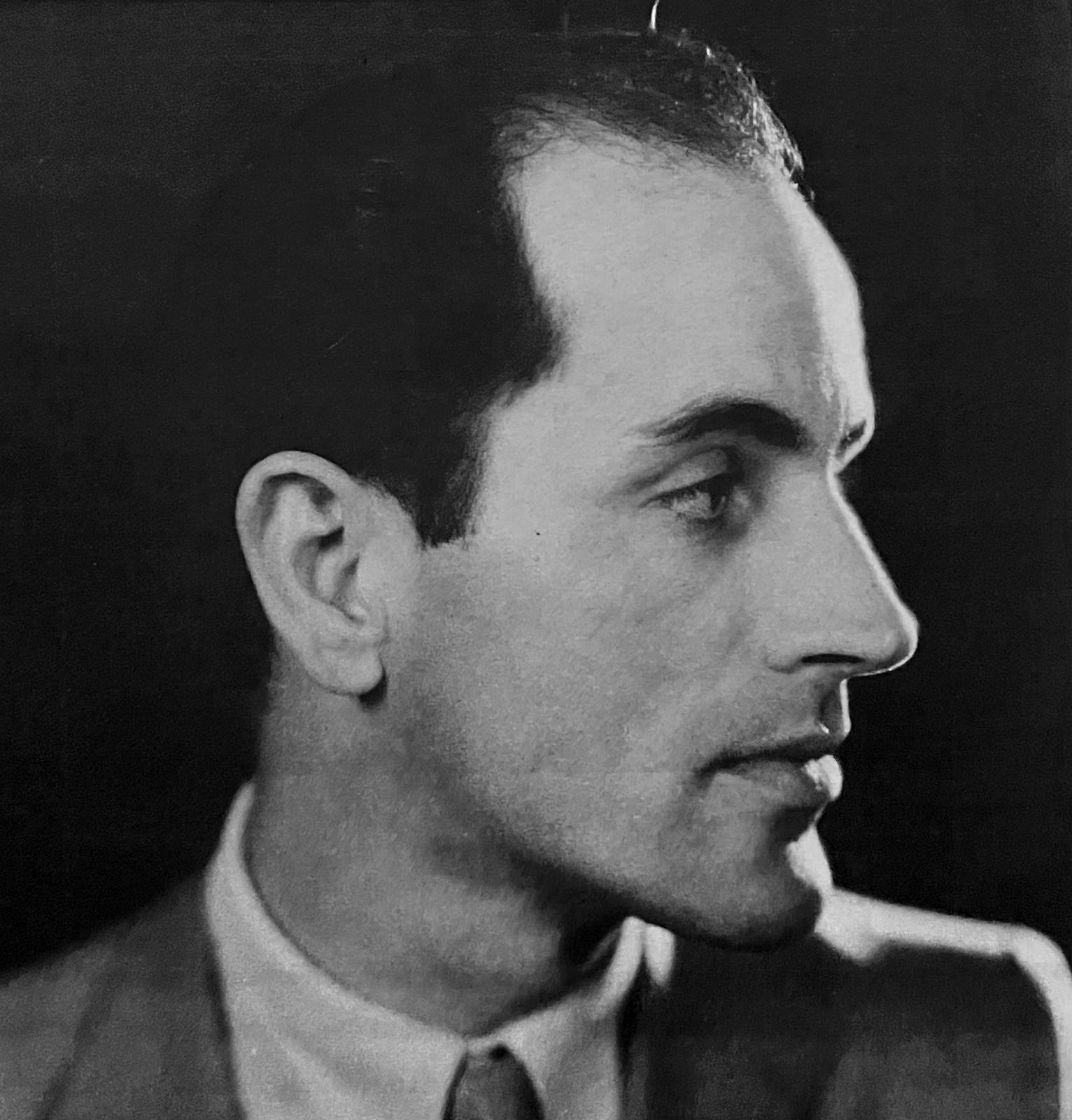
Leopoldo Torres Ríos in the 1930s.

From a formal standpoint, American historian Timothy Barnard highlighted that the film stood apart from the style of the melodramas, musicals, and comedies that dominated the era; a contemporary critic described it as carrying "a whiff of poetry." The film is characterized by a distinctive use of exterior shots, which typically open on treetops or the sky before slowly descending to street-level action, and by the abandonment of shot/reverse shot in favour of long takes that capture all the action or camera movements between two characters in dialogue. Still-life sequences—such as views of the statue in the park—interrupt the narrative line, and the protagonist's daydream was described by Barnard as an "expressionist sequence." Canadian academic Peter H. Rist highlighted the "poetic-realist, long-take style" of the exterior scenes, and noted that Torres Ríos and his brother Carlos Torres Ríos distinguished themselves in location shooting, possibly influenced by the preference of their mentor José A. Ferreyra for filming in the streets.

The film has been described as belonging to the genres of psychological drama, family drama, and melodrama. Its plot is "centred on domestic life and the deterioration that daily routine can produce in love." Several authors have identified it as a portrait of the middle class of Buenos Aires in that era. American researcher John King described it as "almost unique because, unlike other films of the period, it did not turn its gaze towards the streets of Buenos Aires and the rural areas, but instead decided to explore, slowly and meticulously, with great technical complexity, the disintegration of family relationships." The dramatic conflict does not appear until the second half of the film; before that, Torres Ríos devotes himself to exploring the family universe centred on the home.

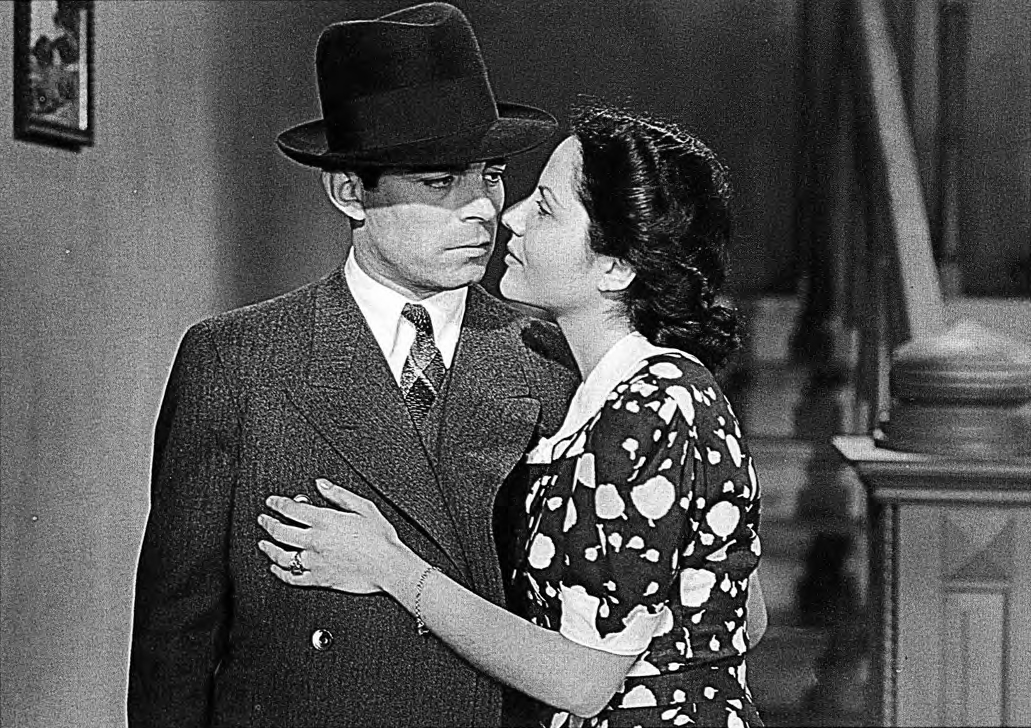
José Gola and Amelia Bence in a scene from the film.

According to Uruguayan academic Jorge Ruffinelli, La vuelta al nido is "an example of the ideological force of masculine values in Argentina at that time. Wife and children belong to the man's world, even when he himself is humiliated in the workplace. The film expresses that domestic authority, where honour is the supreme value, and the woman is the only one who tends to transgress it. What is singular about the story is that it is the woman herself who uses those values to regain her existence within the couple." Barnard further observed that the lower-middle-class milieu that Torres Ríos depicted with sociological precision—an accountant who tallies accounts by hand, a spacious yet austere modern home—would be appropriated a few years later by Argentine cinema to represent artificial studio worlds or the upper classes, thereby stripping it of the social resonance Torres Ríos had given it.

Critic and historian Claudio España characterized Torres Ríos's approach as costumbrismo, describing the film as "a depiction of the difficult and weary urban cohabitation of a young married couple with two small children," and noted that it anticipates "a restrained rhythm and a cold emotion such as those that appear in the cinema of twenty-five years later." España also included it in a list of titles representative of the great Argentine theme of "the family and the lower-middle-class home." Film historian Jorge Miguel Couselo noted that Torres Ríos's portrayal of the typical office worker was possibly the first cinematic equivalent to the descriptions of the archetypal porteño made by writers such as Raúl Scalabrini Ortiz and Roberto Arlt. Argentine critic and programmer Roger Koza wrote: "The seventh film of Torres Ríos is an example of mise-en-scène: objects speak, ellipses gloss as they should, the dialogues convey what is necessary, and the camera movements, at times scandalously modern, as in a minor argument between two office colleagues of the main character, embellish the expressive possibilities of a poetics that shows without emphasis or fuss. The drama is intimate, but not solipsistic: Buenos Aires is a presence, tenuous but real, in this intelligent inquiry into jealousy as a form of derangement."

== Production ==
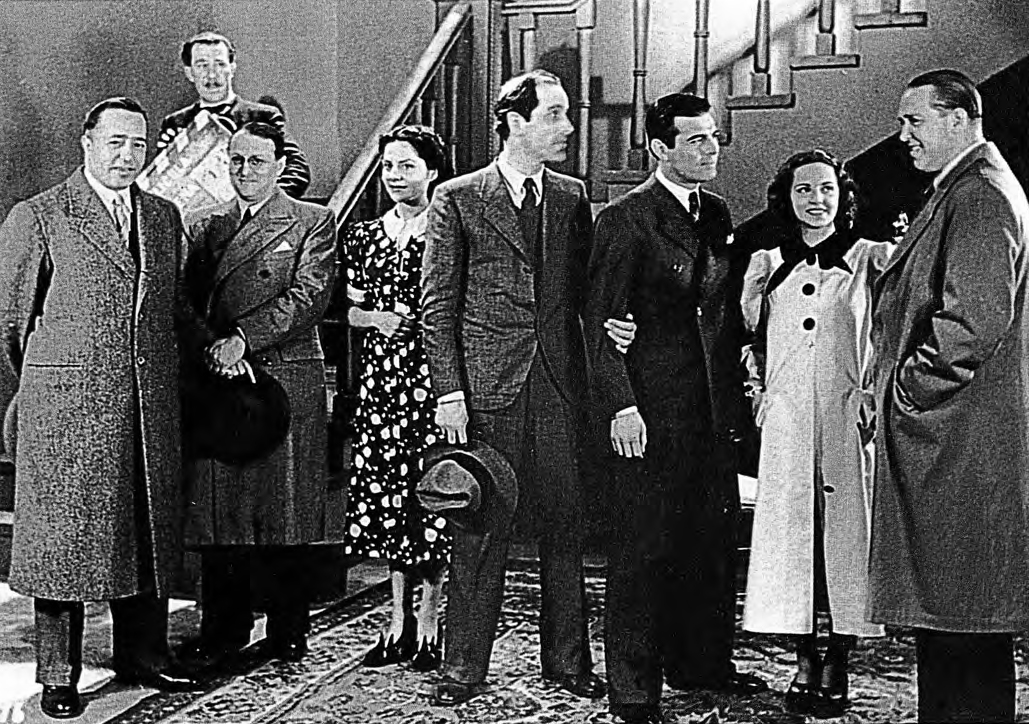
A break during filming at the E.F.A. studios in 1937, with Amelia Bence, Leopoldo Torres Ríos, and José Gola at the centre.

La vuelta al nido was the first production of Estudios E.F.A. (Establecimientos Filmadores Argentinos), created by producers Adolfo Z. Wilson and Julio Joly in partnership with exhibitor Clemente Lococo. In a context of rapid expansion of the Argentine film industry, Wilson, a successful distributor of European cinema, created E.F.A.—originally under the name Porteña Films—and built its production facilities in the Buenos Aires neighborhood of Constitución, where Canal 13 now operates. In June 1937, shortly before the studio's inauguration, the addition of Joly, who specialized in the importation of French cinema, was announced. Although the original plan was for E.F.A. not to produce its own films but to rent out its facilities to third parties, in August of that year the shoots of La casa de Quirós—an Argentina Sono Film production—and La vuelta al nido began simultaneously. The addition of the third partner, Clemente Lococo, owner of one of the largest cinema chains in the country, was announced at the same time. E.F.A. was one of many ventures that arose in a context of exponential growth in the profitability and industrial development of Argentine cinema, a process that had begun with the release of the first sound productions in 1933 and is known as the "Golden Age."

The film is considered the "first major work" of Leopoldo Torres Ríos, who had been working in cinema since the 1920s, during the silent era. During that decade he worked as a film critic (among the first in the country), wrote short stories and tangos, collaborated as a screenwriter with directors José A. Ferreyra—his mentor—and Julio Irigoyen, wrote intertitles for silent films, and worked as a film editor, adapting imported European films for Argentine audiences for the Terra distribution company (owned by Wilson). Only with the advent of sound cinema, and building on the success of at least three silent films (now lost) he had directed in that era, did he obtain the "chance to do whatever he wanted," which led to the making of La vuelta al nido. Barnard noted that Torres Ríos and José A. Ferreyra were the only two directors of the Argentine silent era to survive the transition to sound cinema, and that it was precisely the artistic freedom granted as a reward for his earlier commercial successes that allowed him to undertake such a personal project. According to España, such experimentation was made possible for Torres Ríos by "the inexperience of the producers and the fact that it was his initial attempt." The director brought in the already celebrated leading man of local cinema José Gola and Amelia Bence, to whom he had given her first starring role in Adiós Buenos Aires (1938), an E.F.A. film that, though produced later, was released before La vuelta al nido.

== Release and initial reception ==
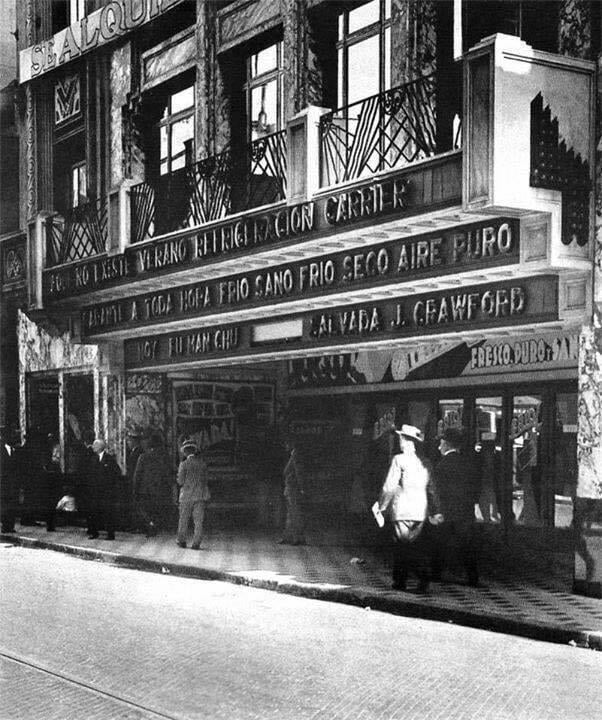
View of the Cine Monumental in Buenos Aires, where the film premiered on 4 May 1938.

Although La vuelta al nido was completed in 1937, its release was delayed nine months due to E.F.A.'s concerns that it was too "uncommercial," despite the studio's apparently favorable position as a partnership of influential figures in the film industry. Director Leopoldo Torre Nilsson, Torres Ríos's son, recalled: "I was twelve years old, a film magazine dying in my greedy little boy's hands. I read aloud: 'Can it really be that bad? For several months now, the Argentine film La vuelta al nido, by Leopoldo Torres Ríos, has been sleeping in its cans. No cinema wants to show it.'" The studio held several private screenings as a test, which included major critics and specialists, and encountered reservations about the film's commercial potential, including the reluctance of Pablo Coll, the manager of the Cine Monumental, known as the "cathedral of Argentine cinema" for being the regular venue for Argentine film premieres during the classical period. A notable exception was the critic Calki, who played a fundamental role in the film's eventual release and mounted a promotional campaign from his influential cinema column in the newspaper El Mundo.

La vuelta al nido finally premiered on 4 May 1938 at the Cine Monumental. The day before, Calki promoted the film in his column: "Tomorrow La vuelta al nido will be released. A few words are in order beforehand. This is not just another Argentine film. For a start, it has the honour of being a work that was debated before its release. La vuelta al nido has been finished for eight or nine months. In this too it is an exception. Because there is a custom in national cinema: almost all films are finished shooting or assembled in a rush because the release date is bearing down on them. Some have only been ready two or three hours before the announced premiere... La vuelta al nido waited days, weeks, months."

I had seen it privately three times and they did not want to release it. One of its producers had said it was "dirtied celluloid." (...) Don Pablo Coll, the manager of the Monumental, who was a friend of mine, told me on leaving: "No, Calki, no. I was tremendously bored; I cannot screen this." "Don Pablo," I told him, "trust me, this is a different film. You will see that audiences will like it and it will even be a success." When it was released, I went. I had already written my praise, left it at the newspaper, and it was already being published. They booed it (there were groups with an interest in booing it, mind you!). It was a great pain for me, because the director even called me and said: "How can you praise a film that was booed by the audience?" I explained: it was the first glimmer of intimate cinema. Everyone else attacked it, except Roland [Rolando Fustiñana], myself, and Zolezzi (...) The rest left poor Torres Ríos in tatters. (...) No, they didn't like it. They couldn't bear a rhythm that slow.

— Calki, interviewed in 1978.

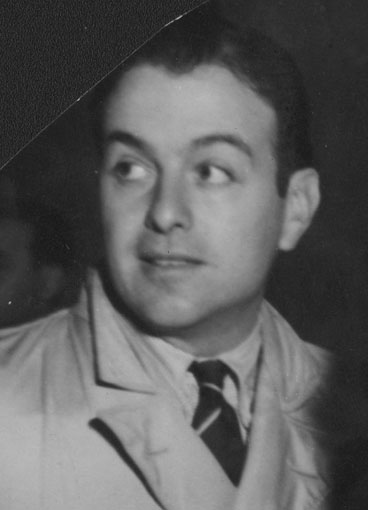
The influential critic Calki was one of the few to praise the film and promoted it frequently in his columns.

The film was a great commercial and critical failure, with the exception of Calki's laudatory review—published the day after its premiere—which described it as: "A pleasant surprise in national cinema. Everything in it is new: the subject, the rhythm, the direction. It is a film with its own spirit, profoundly human. Worthy of standing out, not only within our own output, but also among all current productions of cinema." Alongside Calki, the critic Emilio Zolezzi of El Diario was one of the few to praise the film on its release. For Zolezzi, it was the first time that Argentine cinema had "frankly tackled a psychological drama," noting that "the great masters of the genre, from Pabst and Dupont to Machaty, were present in [Torres Ríos]." However, he qualified it as a "honourable attempt" and pointed to deficiencies in the narrative construction, faulting the director for "the halfway point he traverses without managing to find an action that would fully conjoin the internal logic determining the attitude of his characters."

For its part, the review in La Nación praised the "attempt to fix on the national screen a mirror of our reality in its true dimensions," but criticized its execution, noting that it "errs on the side of slowness" and that "the articulation of the episodes or the continuity does not maintain a very precise balance." The trade magazine El Heraldo del Cine gave it a score of "artistic value: 3½; plot value: 2; category: ordinary," noting: "This production, which owing to its warmth and human feeling could have been one of the happiest expressions of our cinema, suffers from one grave defect: it is developed with extreme slowness in the exposition, with the technique of silent cinema, from which it also borrows the suggestion of images. The excessive insistence on details that repeat unnecessarily diminishes the cinematic drive of a subject which in the early acts shapes up as a family drama full of emotion and tenderness. This defect is especially noticeable in the vision scene, which should have been developed with vertiginous speed. It has excellent photography and good sound in the very scarce dialogues, and has had good performers."

"When my film La vuelta al nido achieved one of the most resounding and simultaneously unnoticed failures in our cinema, I believed I would never be able to make a real film again. I might almost say that from my own limited experience, I stopped believing in cinema, which fortunately lies far beyond all experiences and all failures or successes."

— Leopoldo Torres Ríos, 1974.

According to Zolezzi's later recollection, Roland in Crítica was the critic who came closest to capturing the film's essence, and La Prensa, more sparing in its words, limited itself to recognizing it as "a very clean and honest film." The first issue of the magazine Cine Argentino declared that La vuelta al nido was "a good intention poorly executed," noting that the decision to make a film centred on the psychology of the characters constitutes "an admirable project for making good cinema" but that Torres Ríos "did not have at his disposal the high quality of means necessary to achieve it." The review also noted: "Much was said about La vuelta al nido before its preparation. Everything bad and everything good was said about it. The former was given credence by the exhibitors who denied it their screens. The latter will be judged by the public." According to researcher Martín Batalla: "Only a climate as hostile as this can explain that, before its release, the film lacked any graphic advertising, or that only a couple of days after the premiere, newspaper announcements did not reproduce, as was customary, the opinions of the leading critics, even though they did transcribe the headlines—but only the headlines—of their reviews."

The film's resounding failure had a profound impact on Torres Ríos's career. He recalled years later: "When I made La vuelta al nido, the battering given to me by our poor little provincial world back then left me with no desire to attempt this type of film again for a long time. I spent two years unable to get a contract because people were afraid of me. The almost universal word in the industry was that I 'dirtied the celluloid' and also that I was boring. I had to live, and also to prove that I too knew how to make the same rubbish as almost everyone else, so I made El sobretodo de Céspedes and many others that have nothing to do with cinema." Both Rist and Barnard agreed that the film remained in theatres for barely three days.

== Reassessment and legacy ==
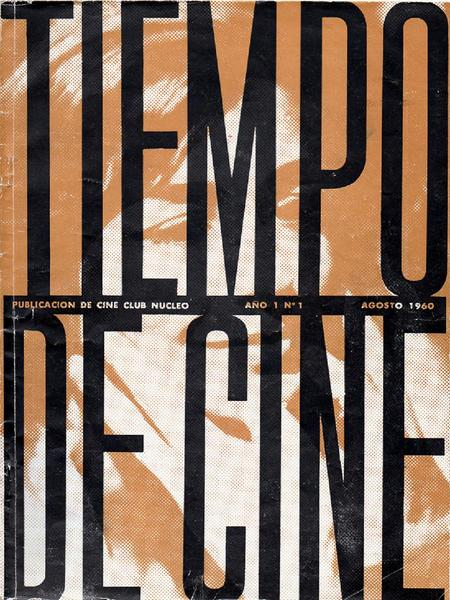
Cover of the first issue of the journal Tiempo de Cine (1960), published by the Cine Club Núcleo, whose members championed the reassessment of La vuelta al nido.

Despite its failure on release, La vuelta al nido has been vindicated over time and is celebrated as a work ahead of its era, the masterpiece of Torres Ríos, and a pioneering classic of "intimate cinema" and auteur cinema in Argentina. The belated critical reassessment took shape in the 1950s and 1960s, thanks to a rescue effort undertaken by cinephile critics of Buenos Aires film clubs. According to Fernando Martín Peña: "The film was rediscovered much later by the young critics of the Cine Club Núcleo and the journal Tiempo de Cine, who not only considered it a curiosity, but also a precursor of the type of cinema that the young directors of the generation of the '60s were about to make." José Agustín Mahieu, a critic who contributed to Tiempo de Cine, described it in 1966 as ahead of its time and with a novel filmic language, writing that "Torres Ríos proves, with La vuelta al nido, language experiments that only a contemporary perspective has appreciated in their full importance." Mahieu highlighted it as "meticulous, intimate observation, with a bold and almost experimental use of camera movements and cinematic time," while also mentioning the "uneven stretches of exposition and a certain structural untidiness."

Critic Domingo Di Núbila, who in his pioneering 1960 book on the history of Argentine cinema had given it only a brief mention echoing the criticisms the film had received in the 1930s, considerably expanded his treatment in the updated 1998 edition, reflecting the profound change that criticism and historiography had undergone with regard to it. Di Núbila described it as "the first cursed film of Argentine cinema," and noted that it "was twenty years ahead of the time when a substantial audience began to accept Bressonian dead time, and when [Torres Ríos] was able to have his revenge with Edad difícil, which won international prizes and performed at the box office." In his 1990 book on the history of Latin American cinema, American researcher John King wrote: "It now seems to us a modern film: at the time, audiences rejected it en masse, baffled by its rhythm and psychological exploration, devoid of tangos or quick jokes." Barnard described it as a film that "sank into oblivion but was rediscovered as an anomalous art film from the studio era of Argentine cinema." Rist noted the paradox that the middle-class milieu depicted in the film became in time the mainstream of Argentine cinema, and that its long-take outdoor style can be traced in the far more celebrated Pelota de trapo (1948).

"Today, La vuelta al nido is a classic of our cinema. It was rediscovered by the young people around the '60s. Among those young people who are now somewhat less young were Couselo, along with Sammaritano, Mahieu, Vena, and a few others."

— Leopoldo Torre Nilsson, 1974.

During the development of Argentine experimental film in the 1970s, the more narrative sector of the movement, led by Silvestre Byrón, was particularly influenced by the film, as recalled by his colleague Claudio Caldini: "It was a more narrative cinema, but with an avant-garde orientation, related to the Kammerspielfilm and certain currents of Argentine cinema of the 1930s. They are not very well known. They have been championed fairly recently. It is a very chamber cinema, very small, almost on the margins of the industry and completely misunderstood by critics. Especially one film called La vuelta al nido. Silvestre was going in that aesthetic direction, of sentimental narrative minimalism."

La vuelta al nido was recognized as the fifth greatest Argentine film of all time in a poll conducted by the Museo del Cine Pablo Ducrós Hicken in 1977, while it ranked 24th in the 2000 edition. In a new version of the survey organized in 2022 by the specialized magazines La vida útil, Taipei, and La tierra quema, presented at the Mar del Plata International Film Festival, the film reached 51st place. In 2010, Ruffinelli included it in his book América Latina en 130 películas, published by Chilean publisher Uqbar, which gathers the films he considers to constitute the canon of Latin American cinema. In 1999, La vuelta al nido appeared on a list of the greatest Latin American films of all time compiled by Cuban critics Carlos Galiano and Rufo Caballero, based on a survey of numerous critics from Latin America and other regions. In the 2022 edition of the Sight & Sound poll of the greatest films of all time, published decennially by the British Film Institute, La vuelta al nido received one vote from Argentine critic Lucas Granero, without reaching the final list.

== See also ==
- List of Argentine films of 1938
- Minimalist film
- Slow cinema

== Bibliography ==
- Di Núbila, Domingo (1998). La época de oro. Historia del cine argentino I (in Spanish). Buenos Aires: Ediciones del Jilguero. ISBN 978-987-957-865-0.
- España, Claudio (1999). "La cinematografía argentina (1896–1945)". Historia general del arte en la Argentina. Tomo VIII (PDF) (in Spanish). Buenos Aires: Academia Nacional de Bellas Artes. pp. 199–254. ISBN 950-612-041-2.
- Peña, Fernando Martín (2012). Cien años de cine argentino (eBook) (in Spanish). Buenos Aires: Editorial Biblos. ISBN 978-987-691-098-9.
