= Payada =

South American tradition of improvised music and poetry

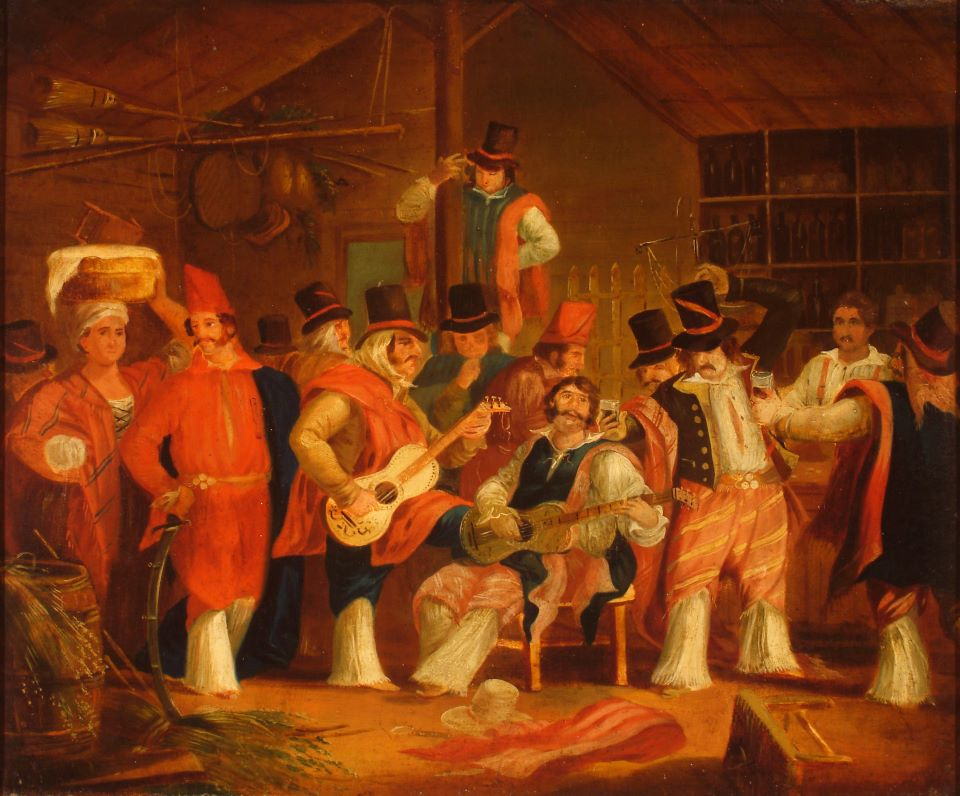
Payada in a pulpería by Carlos Morel

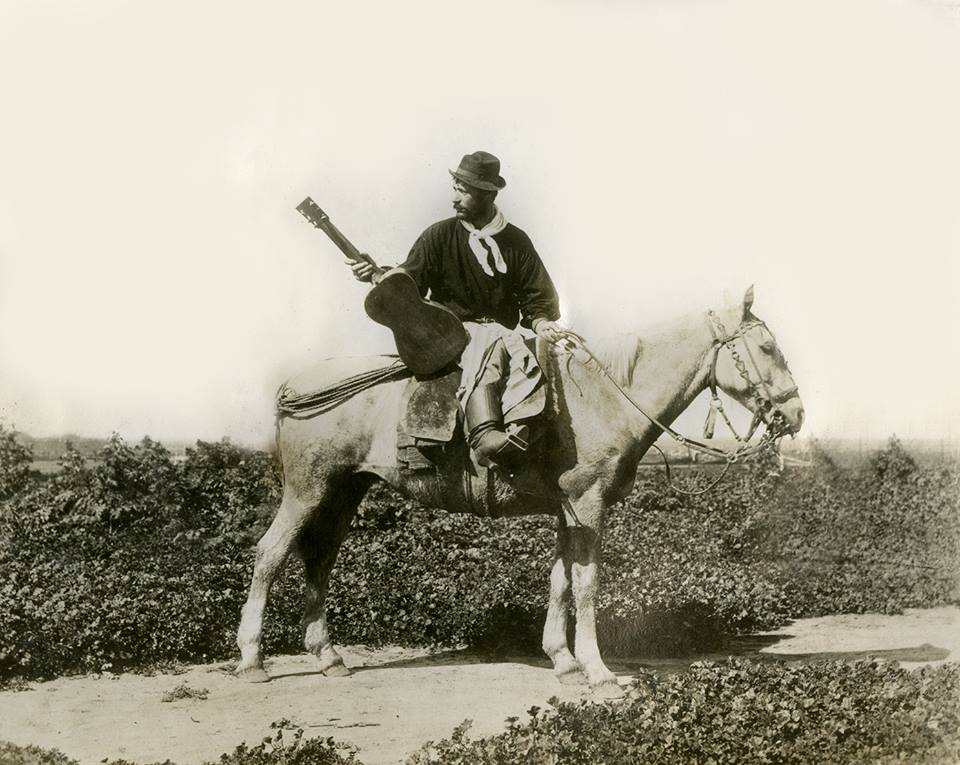
Juan Arroyo, Argentine payador, c. 1870

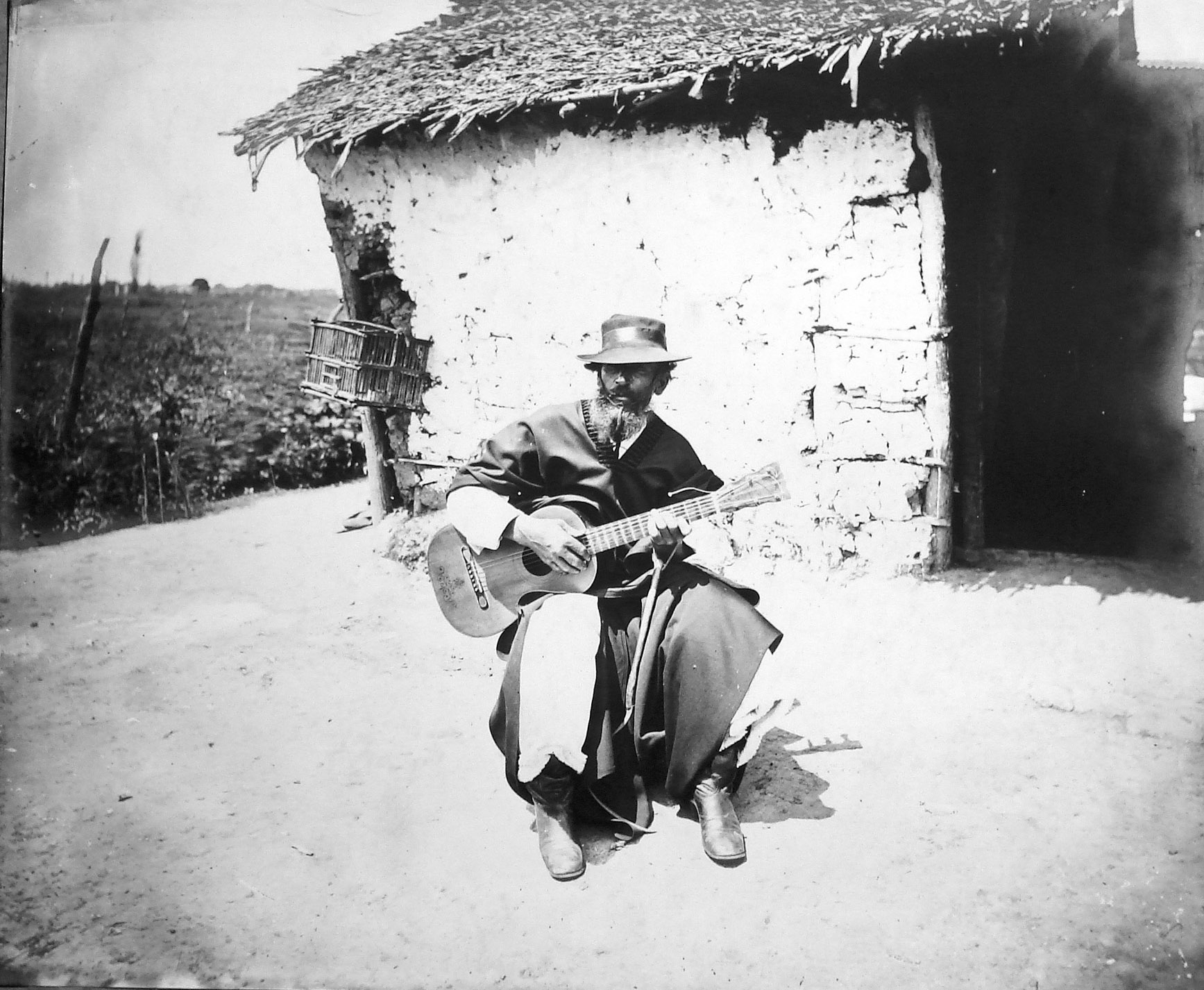
Payador playing in his rancho, c. 1890s

The payada is a folk music tradition native to Argentina, Uruguay, southern Brazil, and south Paraguay as part of the Gaucho culture and Gaucho literature. In Chile it is called paya and performed by huasos. It is a performance of improvised ten-line verse called décimas usually accompanied by guitar. The performer is called a "payador", albeit any guitar performer in the region is called by the same name. In performances of two or more payadores (the "payada"), known as contrapunto, they will compete to produce the most eloquent verse, each answering questions posed by the other, often insulting. The durations of these verse duels can be exceedingly long, often many hours, and they end when one payador fails to respond immediately to his opponent. Musical styles often used in the payada are the cifra, the huella and the milonga.

== History ==
The work of Bartolomé Hidalgo (born in Montevideo in 1788) is considered a precedent of this form of art in the Río de la Plata. Hidalgo is regarded as the first gaucho poet. His birthdate, August 24, was established as the "Day of the Payador" in Uruguay.

In Argentina, July 23 was established as the "Day of the Payador" in commemoration of the famous payada where Juan de Nava and Gabino Ezeiza contended. This payada was held in Paysandú in 1884, and Ezeiza was proclaimed the winner with the improvisation of his famous Saludo a Paysandú. A recording of this song is the only existing record of Ezeiza's voice.

The first registered payador was Simón Méndez (nicknamed Guasquita), a soldier who fought in the British invasions of the River Plate. Both in Argentina and Uruguay, the payada is considered part of the "gauchesca" culture. Santos Vega (to whom writer Rafael Obligado dedicated his most famous poem) is considered "the" payador par excellence, with successors such as Gabino Ezeiza, José Betinotti, Carlos Molina, Abel Soria, Julio Gallego, Gabino Sosa Benítez, Cayetano Daglio, among others.

The payada has also been parodied by the comedy-musical group Les Luthiers in their Payada de la vaca.

The work of Bartolomé Hidalgo, born in Montevideo in 1788, who is considered the first gaucho poet, can be found as an antecedent to the appearance of this art in the Río de la Plata. The date of his birth (August 24) was established by law as "Payador's Day" in Uruguay.

The payada can be traced back to the troubadour traditions of southern Spain, which settlers then brought the music tradition to Latin America. When it reached Argentina, its development was greatly influenced by Afro-Argentines in the late 19th century. During this time, Argentina's government were trying to "whiten" the country by encouraging European migration and marginalizing the black community. Black payadores like Gabino Ezeiza used their music to fight against the discrimination and they sought recognitionfor Afro-Argentines' deep historical contributions. Even though the government were able erase most of Afro-Argentine presence, there are still people in the Americas who practice the music traditions that originated from Afro-Argentines and African ancestry.

== See also ==
- Gaucho literature
- Olmué Festival
- Martín Fierro
- Santos Vega
- Guitarrón chileno
