= Palermo (film) =

1937 film

AOC Simping
- Directed by: Arturo S. Mom
- Written by: Guillermo Salazar Altamira
- Starring: Nedda Francy; José Gola; Orestes Caviglia; Pedro Quartucci
- Cinematography: Antonio Merayo
- Edited by: Bruno Boval
- Music by: José Vázquez Vigo
- Production company: Sono Film
- Distributed by: Sono Film
- Release date: 23 June 1937
- Running time: 90 minutes
- Country: Argentina
- Language: Spanish

Palermo is a 1937 Argentine comedy film of the Golden Age of Argentine cinema directed by Arturo S. Mom and starring Nedda Francy, José Gola and Orestes Caviglia. The film's title refers to the Palermo neighborhood of Buenos Aires. The story was written by Guillermo Salazar Altamira, a sports journalist.

== Synopsis ==
A petty criminal attempts to fleece a wealthy horse racing fan with the help of a beautiful woman who turns out to be an undercover member of the police.

== Cast ==
- Nedda Francy
- José Gola
- Orestes Caviglia
- Pedro Quartucci
- Aída Luz
- Pablo Palitos
- Sebastián Chiola
- Juan Mangiante
- Pedro Fiorito
- Fausto Fornoni
- Miguel Mileo
- Augusto Codecá
- Darío Cossier

== Bibliography ==
- Abel Posadas, Mónica Landro, Marta Speroni. Cine sonoro argentino: 1933-1943. El Calafate Editores, 2005.
