= The Caranchos of Florida (film) =

- Directed by: Alberto De Zavalia
- Written by: Benito Lynch (novel); Alfredo G. Volpe; Carlos Aden; Alberto De Zavalia
- Starring: José Gola; Amelia Bence
- Cinematography: Roberto Schmidt; José Suarez
- Edited by: Nicolás Proserpio
- Music by: Homero Manzi; José Pécora; Sebastián Piana; Rodolfo Sachs
- Production company: Pampa Film
- Distributed by: Pampa Film
- Release date: 2 November 1938
- Running time: 80 minutes
- Country: Argentina
- Language: Spanish

The Caranchos of Florida (Spanish: Los caranchos de la Florida) is a 1938 Argentine drama film of the Golden Age of Argentine cinema directed and co-written by Alberto De Zavalia. The film premiered in Buenos Aires and starred José Gola and Amelia Bence.

The film is based on a novel of the same title by Benito Lynch.

In the United States release the film was distributed by Cinexport Distributing Co.

== Cast ==
- José Gola
- Amelia Bence
- Domingo Sapelli
- Homero Cárpena
- Froilán Varela
- Herminia Mancini
- Isabel Figlioli
- Carlos Bellucci
- Miguel Ligero
- Carlos Fioriti
- Néstor Feria

== Plot ==
The film deals with the conflict between a father, master of a cattle ranch, and his son, who has coming back home after graduation, over the young's romantic involvement with the daughter of a ranch hand.
