= The Caranchos of Florida (novel) =

1916 novel by Benito Lynch

- Author: Benito Lynch
- Original title: Los caranchos de la Florida
- Language: Spanish
- Publication date: 1916
- Publication place: Argentina
- Media type: Print

The Caranchos of Florida (Spanish:Los Caranchos de la Florida) is a novel by the Argentine writer Benito Lynch, which was first published in 1916. The title refers to the crested caracara, a bird of prey known in Spanish as "Caranchos", and used as a pejorative similar to the English "vulture". The Florida in the title refers to a cattle ranch in rural Argentina, rather than the American state of the same name. It is part of the Gaucho literature genre.

In 1938 it was adapted into a film of the same title.

== Bibliography ==
- Williams, Raymond Leslie. The Twentieth-Century Spanish American Novel. University of Texas Press, 2009.
