= Juan Carlos Lamas =

Argentine actor (1921–2004)

Juan Carlos Lamas (October 13, 1921 – July 27, 2004), born Rafael Velázquez, was an Argentine actor from Rosario. He starred in the 1962 film Una Jaula no tiene secretos.

== Selected filmography ==
- Poppy (1952)
- Sunday Heroes (1952)
- The Romance of a Gaucho (1961)
