= The Englishman of the Bones (novel) =

1924 novel

- First edition
- Author: Benito Lynch
- Original title: El inglés de los güesos
- Language: Spanish
- Genre: Gaucho literature
- Publisher: Calpe
- Publication date: 1924
- Publication place: Argentina
- Media type: Print

The Englishman of the Bones (Spanish: El inglés de los güesos) is a 1924 Argentine novel by Benito Lynch. It is part of the Gaucho literature movement. A major theme of the novel is the cultural exchanges between the British and the Argentine characters. In 1940 it was adapted into a film of the same title directed by Carlos Hugo Christensen.

== Synopsis ==
A young English expert on fossils meets and has a relationship with a gaucho woman while he is investigating the remains of indigenous people in Argentina. When he leaves, she is overcome with despair and kills herself.

== Bibliography ==
- Huberman, Ariana. Gauchos and Foreigners: Glossing Culture and Identity in the Argentine Countryside. Lexington Books, 2010.
- Torres-Rioseco, Arturo. The Epic of Latin American Literature. University of California Press, 1961.
