= Hilario Ascasubi =

Argentine poet, politician and diplomat

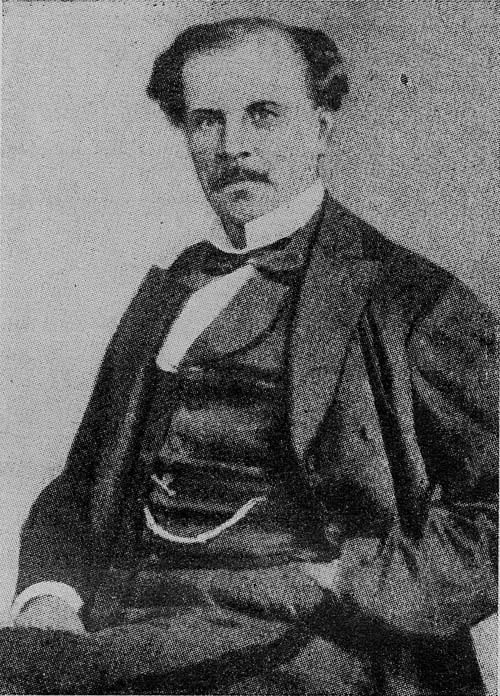
- Hilario Ascasubi
- Born: 1807; Bell Ville, Córdoba, Argentina
- Died: November 17, 1875 (aged 67–68); Buenos Aires
- Writing career
- Language: Spanish
- Genre: Gaucho literature

Hilario Ascasubi (1807 – November 17, 1875) was an Argentine poet, politician and diplomat. He played an active role in the resistance to the dictatorship of Juan Manuel de Rosas. Ascasubi was also a prominent figure in gaucho literature.

== Biography ==
Ascasubi was born in the back of a horse-drawn cart during a thunderstorm, in Bell Ville, Córdoba, while his mother was on her way to a wedding in Buenos Aires. Although in his later years, the poet was associated with the countryside, he spent his early years in the cities, particularly Buenos Aires and Córdoba.

In 1821, he boarded a ship heading to France. The ship was hijacked and diverted to Lisbon. He escaped, went to France, and lived there for two years. In the 1820s, he joined the military and fought Brazil. He then fought in the Argentine Civil War. When he started writing against Juan Manuel de Rosas, he was exiled in Montevideo, Uruguay. There he continued writing poetry and ran a bakery shop. He also founded a gauchesque paper with liberal characters in opposition to the works of Luis Perez. Ascasubi was considered the rival of Perez, who was a Federalist gazetter. In 1843, he published El gaucho Jacinto Cielo con doce números and in 1846, he published Paulino Lucero. Together with his patrician wife, he hosted expatriates including the Varelas, a family of intellectuals.

Upon his return to Buenos Aires, in 1868 he was assigned a diplomatic mission to Paris, France, by President Bartolomé Mitre. During his posting, he was assigned to head the newly created immigration office responsible for the recruitment of new immigrants and workers for the agriculture fields, unfortunately among this contingent of workers arrived in Argentina a large number of French revolutionaries.

He died in Buenos Aires in 1875, shortly after arriving from his diplomatic posting to France of an intestinal problem; there is a conspiracy theory that he was poisoned by his political enemies.

== Poetry ==
Ascasubi is noted for introducing the use of vernacular language in his poetry. During his time, the local gaucho language was not considered "literary". He wrote in the first person while his technique is considered rustic. He focused on political themes and was inspired by the works of Bartolomé Hidalgo. Ascasubi was the only poet among the authors belonging to the Unitarians and Colorados who achieved success and reached a large public. The long form poem Paulino Lucero set in the post-independence Argentina included a criticism of Rosas for his failure to carry out his promise of extermination.

Ascasubi wrote in the name of Santo Vega, earning him acclaim from 1850 to 1872. This gaucho character, a payador, was first introduced by Bartolomé Mitre in his 1838 poem A Santos Vega. Ascasubi used this character in his work Santos Vega o Los mellizos de La Flor. His version was written in verse and was described as gauchesque poem with exceptional lyric elements, featuring many dramatic episodes.

== Publications ==
Each year links to its corresponding "[year] in poetry" article:

- 1843: El gaucho Jacinto Cielo con doce números
- 1846: Paulino Lucero
- 1851: Santos Vega o los mellizos de la Flor
- 1853: Aniceto el Gallo
- 1872: Obras completas ("Complete Works"), three volumes compiled by the author

== See also ==
- Argentine literature
- Gaucho literature
