= The Romance of a Gaucho (film) =

1961 film

- Directed by: Rubén W. Cavallotti
- Written by: Benito Lynch (novel); Ulyses Petit de Murat
- Produced by: Enrique Faustin
- Starring: Walter Vidarte; Lydia Lamaison; Julia Sandoval; Rolando Chaves
- Cinematography: Aníbal González Paz
- Edited by: José Serra
- Music by: Tito Ribero
- Release date: 18 August 1961
- Running time: 86 minutes
- Country: Argentina
- Language: Spanish

The Romance of a Gaucho (Spanish:El Romance de un gaucho) is a 1961 Argentine drama film directed by Rubén W. Cavallotti and starring Walter Vidarte, Lydia Lamaison and Julia Sandoval. It is based on the 1930 novel of the same title by Benito Lynch. The film's sets were designed by Saulo Benavente.

== Cast ==
- Walter Vidarte
- Lydia Lamaison
- Julia Sandoval
- Rolando Chaves
- Guillermo Battaglia
- Juan Carlos Lamas
- Mario Casado
- Margarita Corona
- Silvia Nolasco
- Mirtha Miller
- Mariano Vidal Molina
