= March of the Malvinas =

Song
- Published: 1940
- Genre: Argentinian militar march
- Songwriter: Carlos Obligado
- Composer: Jose Tieri

The Marcha de las Malvinas (in English: March of the Falklands) is a patriotic anthem of Argentina. It is sung in demonstrations to assert Argentina sovereignty claims over the Falkland Islands (in Spanish: Islas Malvinas) and was prominently broadcast by the military government (controlled media during the Falklands War).

On March 3, 1948, it was premiered by the Argentine National Symphony Orchestra.

Since 2017, it is also the official anthem of Tierra del Fuego, Antarctica, and South Atlantic Islands province.

The lyrics were written by the Argentine poet Carlos Obligado and the music was composed by José Tieri. They won a 1939 contest organised by the Junta de Recuperación de las Malvinas (Falklands Recovery Commission).

== Lyrics ==
Spanish Lyrics	English Translation
Tras su manto de neblinas, no las hemos de olvidar; «¡Las Malvinas Argentinas!» clama el viento y ruge el mar. Ni de aquellos horizontes nuestra enseña han de arrancar, pues su blanco está en los montes Y en su azul se tiñe el mar. ¡Por ausente, por vencido; bajo extraño pabellón; ningún suelo más querido, De la Patria en la extensión! ¿Quién nos habla aquí de olvido, de renuncia, de perdón? ¡Ningún suelo más querido, De la Patria en la extensión! ¡Rompa el manto de neblinas, como un sol, nuestro ideal: «las Malvinas Argentinas», en dominio ya inmortal! Y ante el sol de nuestro emblema, pura, nítida y triunfal, brille, ¡Oh, Patria!, en tu diadema la perdida perla austral. ¡Para honor de nuestro emblema, para orgullo nacional! Brille, ¡Oh, Patria! en tu diadema, la perdida perla austral. Brille, ¡Oh, Patria! en tu diadema la perdida perla austral.	Behind their misty quilt We shall not forget them. "The Argentine Falklands"; Claims the wind and roars the sea Nor from those horizons Will our ensign be ripped apart Since its white is on the hills And the sea is dyed its blue For absent, for defeated Under a strange flag No land is more cherished Of the Fatherland as a whole Who is talking to us here of neglect Of renouncement, of forgiveness? For no land is more cherished Of the Fatherland as a whole! Break off the misty quilt As a sun, our ideal The Argentine Falkalnds! Under an already immortal dominion, And facing the sun of our emblem Pure, distinct, and victorious It shines, "Oh, Fatherland!" in your diadem The lost Southern pearl. For honour to our emblem, For the national pride, It shines, "Oh, Fatherland!" in your diadem, The lost Southern pearl. It shines, "Oh, Fatherland!" in your diadem, The lost Southern pearl.
