= Gaucho literature =

South American literary movement

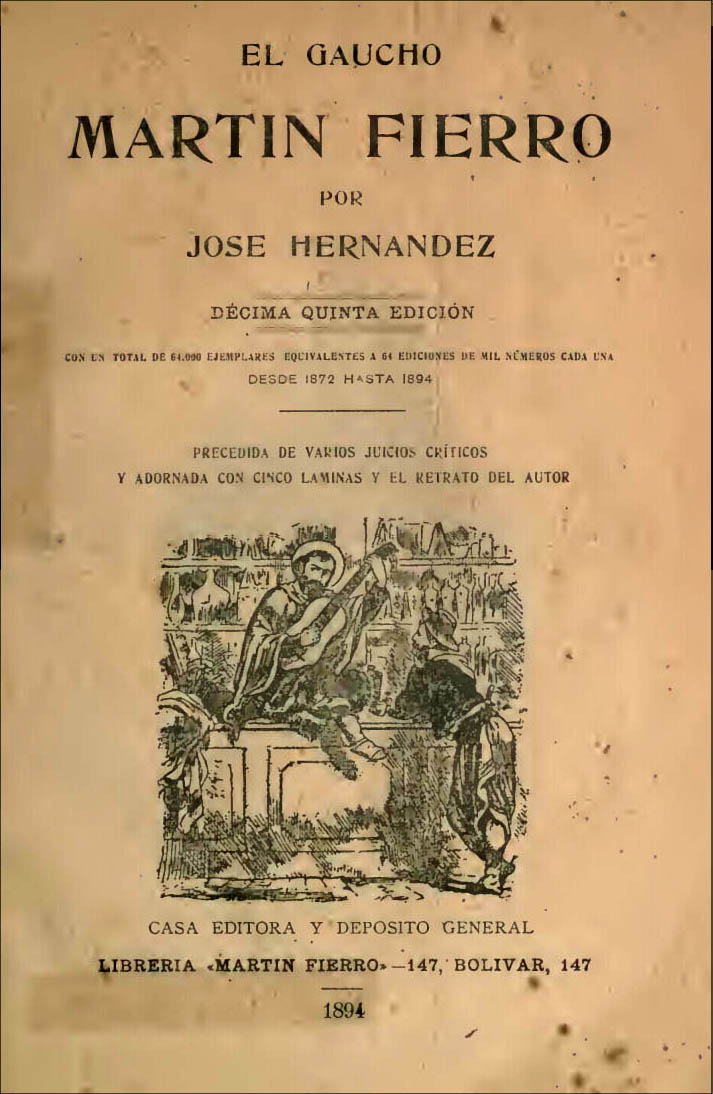
Martín Fierro, written in 1872 by José Hernández is considered the masterpiece of gaucho literature.

Gaucho literature, also known in Spanish as género gauchesco ("gauchoesque" genre) was a literary movement purporting to use the language of the gauchos, comparable to the American cowboy, and reflecting their mentality. Although earlier works have been identified as gauchoesque, the movement particularly thrived from the 1870s to 1920s in Argentina, Uruguay and southern Brazil after which the movement petered out, although some works continued to be written. Gauchoesque works continue to be read and studied as a significant part of Argentine literary history.

The movement arose as writers in those countries developed their understanding of their national identities. Three great poets in this trend were José Hernández, Estanislao del Campo and Hilario Ascasubi.

The influence of folk music and a countrified language has always, to some extent, been felt in popular literature, as, for example, in the folk-flavoured poetry of the Uruguayan gauchoesque poet Bartolomé Hidalgo (1788–1822). The influx on the soul which the gaucho exercises can be felt on the work of much later writers who loved the country scene of Argentina and Uruguay, such as Ricardo Güiraldes, Benito Lynch and Enrique Amorim. This is particularly true of even the most modern Uruguayan literature.

With Mark Twain's attempt to reproduce the dialect of Missouri boys, slaves, "injuns", etc., gauchoesque literature actually aspires to use, to perpetuate what purports to be the actual language of the gauchos.

== Significant works and authors of Gaucho literature ==
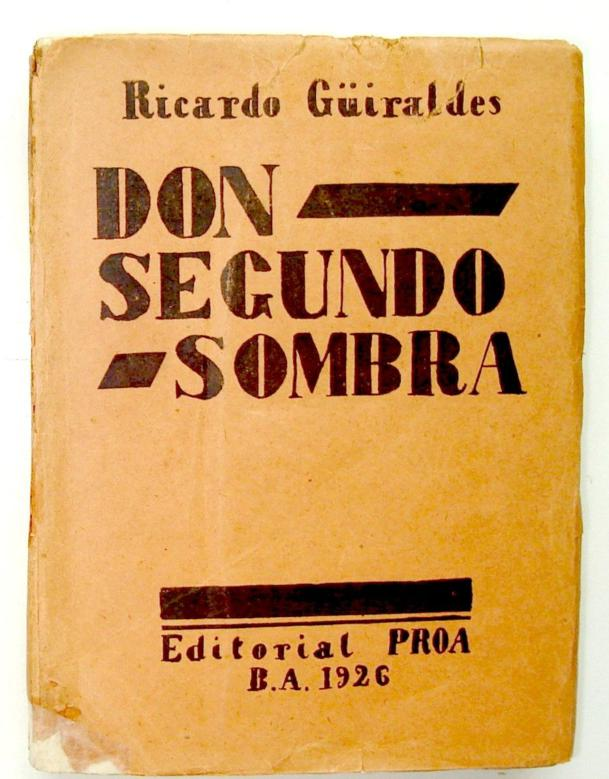
Cover of the first edition of Don Segundo Sombra, by Ricardo Güiraldes (1926).

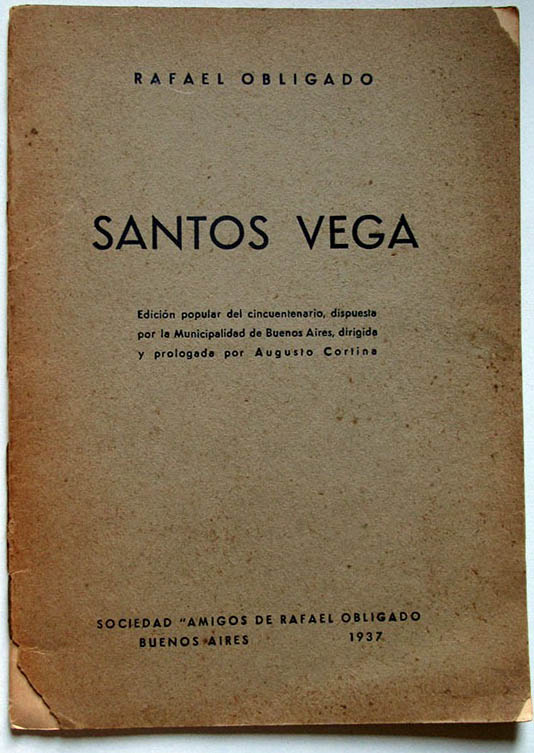
1937 edition of Santos Vega by Rafael Obligado.

Each year links to its corresponding "[year] in literature" article, except for poetry, which links to its "[year] in poetry" article:

=== Poetry ===
- Hilario Ascasubi, Santos Vega o los Mellizos de la Flor (1851)
- Estanislao del Campo, Fausto (1866)
- Jose Hernandez, Martin Fierro (first part 1872, second part 1879)
- Rafael Obligado, Santos Vega (1885)
- Leopoldo Lugones Romances del rio Seco, La guerra gaucha y otros
- Delfina Benigna da Cunha

=== Novels ===
- Eduarda Mansilla, Pablo ou la vie dans les Pampas (1869)
- Eduardo Gutiérrez, Juan Moreira (1880)
- William Henry Hudson, The Purple Land (1885)
- Benito Lynch:
  - The Englishman of the Bones (1924)
  - The Romance of a Gaucho (1930)
- Ricardo Güiraldes, Don Segundo Sombra (1926)

=== Other Argentine writers ===
In chronological order by birth year;

- Juan Gualberto Godoy (1793–1864)
- Domingo Faustino Sarmiento (1811–1888)
- Bartolomé Mitre (1821-1906)

=== Other Uruguayan writers ===
- Bartolomé Hidalgo (1788–1822)
- Eduardo Acevedo Díaz (1851–1921)
- Javier de Viana (1868–1926)
- Justino Zavala Muniz (1898–1968)
- Serafín J. García
- Alcides de María
- Orosmán Moratorio (1852-1898)
- Wenceslao Varela

=== Other Nationalities ===
- Ramiro Fortes de Barcelos (1851-1916)
- Gauchesque revival as parody:
  - Roberto Bolaño Ávalos (1953-2003)
  - Oscar Fariña (1980-)
