= Rafael Obligado Castle =

Coordinates: 33°33′05″S 59°52′11″W

General information
- Location: Buenos Aires Province, Argentina
- Completed: 1898

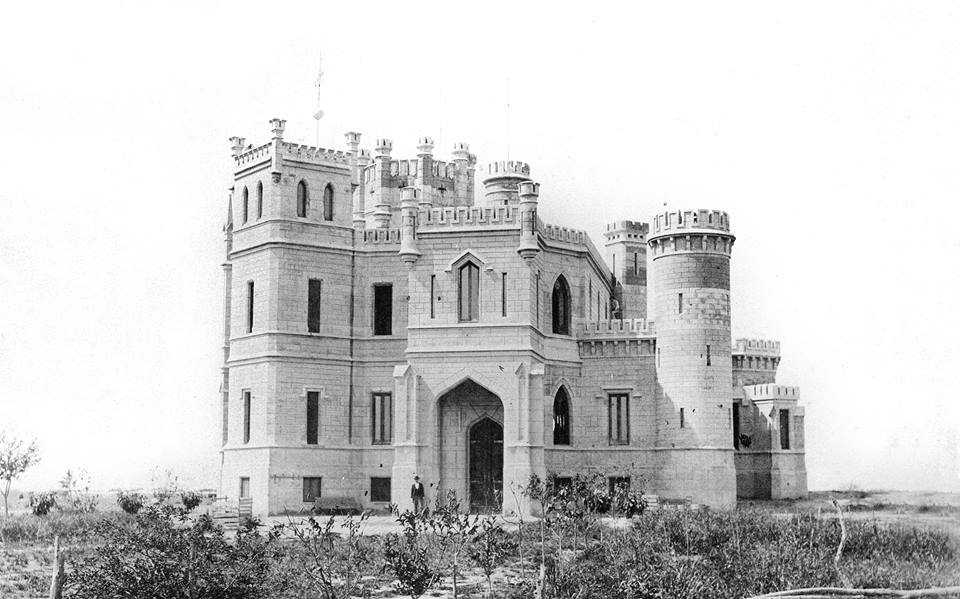
The Obligado Castle near Ramallo and the Vuelta de Obligado

The Rafael Obligado Castle is an architecturally significant private residence located between Ramallo and San Pedro, Buenos Aires Province in Argentina.

== Overview ==
Set along the banks of the Paraná River, the residence was commissioned by Argentine poet Rafael Obligado in 1896. The estate itself had belonged to the Obligado family since the land's 1789 purchase by Antonio Obligado, a Castilian merchant who had relocated from Andalucia, Spain, and was located within sight of the historic, 1845 Battle of Vuelta de Obligado in the waters of the Paraná River. The design for the home, commissioned to German Argentine architect Adolfo Büttner, was based on Neo-Gothic architecture by request of the client. Obligado wished to evoke the settings described in the works of Scottish writer Sir Walter Scott (a favorite of his wife, Isabel Gómez Langenheim).

Completed in 1898, the three-story residence includes 37 rooms and nine baths. The floors are connected via three distinct staircases accessed from a grand reception hall, and the house possesses numerous secret passageways. Known as the Estancia El Castillo, the property remains in the Obligado family and is one of a number of distinguished estancias located in the surrounding Pampas; the estate remains an agricultural holding.
