= Claudio Caldini =

Argentine experimental filmmaker

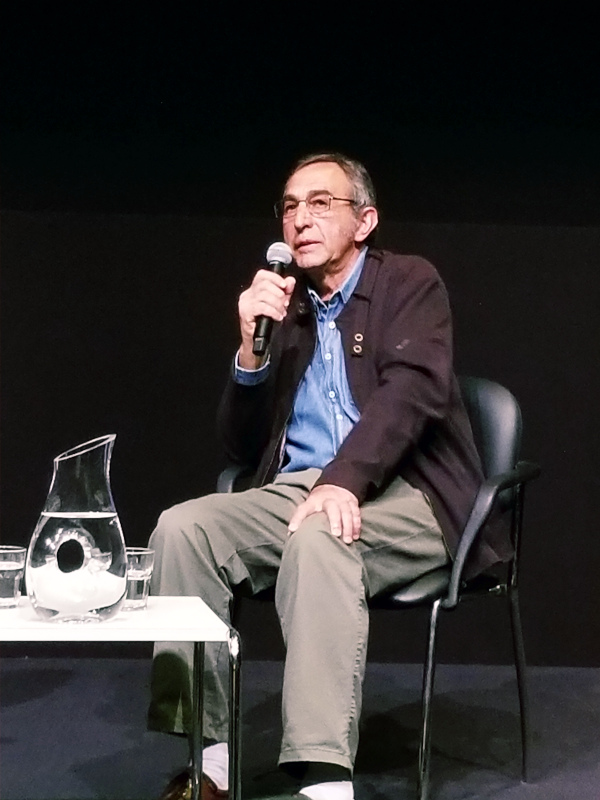
Claudio Caldini in 2017

Claudio Caldini (born 1952) is an Argentine experimental filmmaker.

== Biography ==
Caldini was born in 1952 and learned as a child how to use a camera. His earliest films, starting in the late 1960s, were silent works documenting concerts in Buenos Aires. Caldini joined the Unión de Cineastas de Paso Reducido (UNCIPAR) film collective, but his work was met with hostility there. He came to be associated with other experimental Super 8 filmmakers known as the Grupo Cine Experimental Argentino, or the Grupo Goethe. His 1975 film Ventana, in which he captured a narrow band of light coming through a window and layered it upon itself with various camera movements, marked a shift away from realism.

After a stay in a psychiatric hospital, Caldini visited the Auroville planned community in 1978. Ofrenda (1978) was made shortly after, while he was staying at his father's house. The film shows daisies from his father's garden, shot one frame at a time. For many years, Caldini moved regularly, spending time in Argentina, India, and France. His activities during the 1980s included working as a stagehand, working as a lighting technician for Batato Barea, becoming a keyboardist, and working with a dance company. Andrés Di Tella published a 2011 book Hachazos about Caldini, along with a documentary film the following year.

== Artistic style and influence ==
Caldini's films are often described as "poetic" or "lyrical". Matt Losada connects the works not through shared techniques, but rather their ability to "reveal the hypnotic power of pure forms of nature". He notes a frequent interest in plants and light, which he likens to the work of American filmmaker Nathaniel Dorsky. Caldini's late career has embraced live film performance and elements of expanded cinema.

== Bibliography ==
- Bollig, Ben (2021). Moving Verses: Poetry on Screen in Argentine Cinema. Liverpool University Press. ISBN 9781800859784.
