= The Romance of a Gaucho (novel) =

1930 novel

- 1933 edition
- Author: Benito Lynch
- Original title: El romance de un gaucho
- Language: Spanish
- Genre: Gaucho literature
- Publisher: Librerías Anaconda
- Publication date: 1930
- Publication place: Argentina
- Media type: Print

The Romance of a Gaucho (Spanish: El romance de un gaucho) is a 1930 novel by the Argentine writer Benito Lynch. It forms part of the Gaucho literature movement of the era. In 1961 the novel was adapted into a film of the same title directed by Rubén W. Cavallotti.

== Bibliography ==
- Torres-Rioseco, Arturo. The Epic of Latin American Literature. University of California Press, 1961.
