= The Englishman of the Bones (film) =

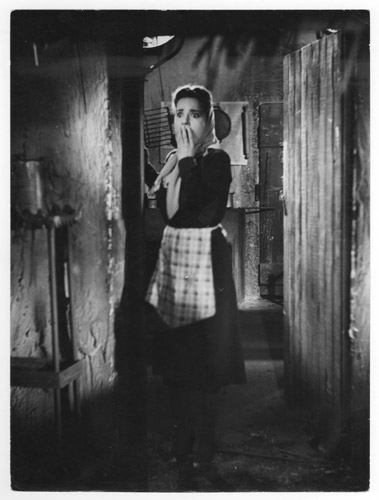
- Anita Jordán in The Englishman of the Bones
- Directed by: Carlos Hugo Christensen
- Written by: Carlos Hugo Christensen
- Based on: El inglés de los güesos by Benito Lynch
- Starring: Arturo García Buhr, Anita Jordán and Pedro Maratea
- Cinematography: José María Beltrán
- Edited by: Juan Soffici
- Music by: George Andreani
- Production company: Lumiton
- Release date: 1940
- Country: Argentina
- Language: Spanish

The Englishman of the Bones (Spanish:El inglés de los güesos) is a 1940 Argentine melodrama film of the Golden Age of Argentine cinema directed and written by Carlos Hugo Christensen, based on a novel of the same name by Benito Lynch.

== Production ==
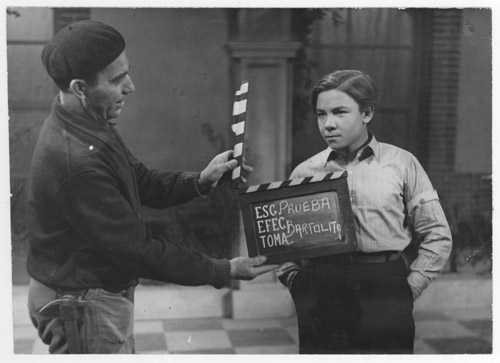
Director Christensen and Tito Alonso on set

The 79-minute black and white drama was directed for Lumiton by Carlos Hugo Christensen. Christiansen (1914–1999) was a poet, short story writer, journalist and playwright who became an assistant film director in 1939. This was one of the first films where he was credited as director. The script was written by Christensen based on the novel of the same name written by Benito Lynch. Music was by George Andreani and cinematography by José María Beltrán. It was released in Argentina on 4 September 1940. The film El inglés de los güesos starred Arturo García Buhr, Anita Jordán and Pedro Maratea.

== Synopsis ==
El inglés de los güesos tells of a hopeless love between an English anthropologist and a gaucho girl. The Englishman, who has come to study fossils, must return to his homeland. The film treats the novel with respect, and provides a true interpretation.

== Reception ==
La Nación said of the film that the simple plot had been well handled. The adaptation retained the extraordinary sense of scenery and drama. Manrupe and Portela said that despite the very slow action and the poor book, the film maintains interest because of good performances. Some elements of the framing and montage foreshadow the director's later style.

== Cast ==
The cast includes:

- Arturo García Buhr
- Anita Jordán
- Pedro Maratea
- Elisardo Santalla
- Raimundo Pastore
- Tito Alonso
- Aurelia Ferrer
- Herminia Mancini
- Alfredo Jordan
