= Augusto Codecá =

Argentine actor (1906–1978)

- Born: 7 June 1906; Buenos Aires, Argentina
- Died: 7 May 1978 (aged 71); Buenos Aires, Argentina
- Occupation: Actor
- Years active: 1935-1976 (film)

Augusto Codecá (7 June 1906 – 7 May 1978) was an Argentine film actor.

== Selected filmography ==
- Palermo (1937)
- Cándida (1939)
- Candida, Woman of the Year (1943)
- The Three Musketeers (1946)

== Bibliography ==
- Finkielman, Jorge. The Film Industry in Argentina: An Illustrated Cultural History. McFarland, 24 Dec 2003.
