= Santos Vega =

Mythical Argentine gaucho, and invincible payador

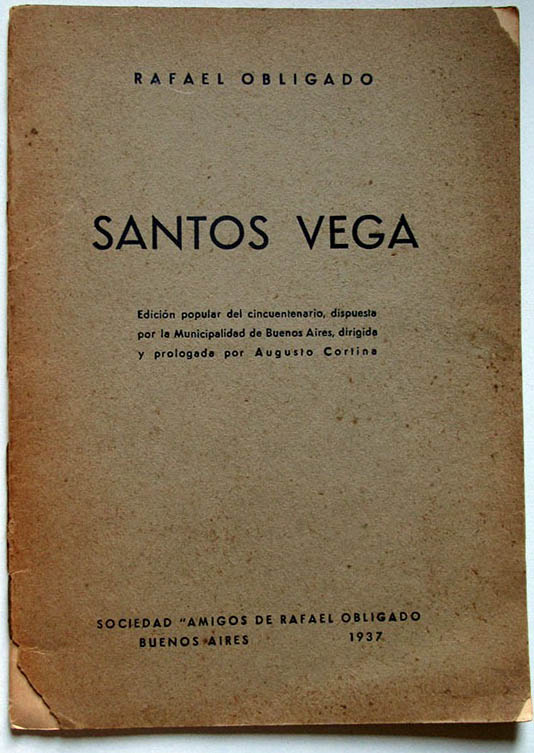
Cover to Santos Vega, by Rafael Obligado. 1937 edition.

Santos Vega was a mythical Argentine gaucho, and invincible payador (a kind of minstrel that competed in singing competitions resembling dialectic discussions), who was only defeated by the Devil himself, disguised as the payador Juan sin Ropa ("John Clothless").

The myth states he is buried near San Clemente del Tuyú.

Argentina's President Bartolomé Mitre was the first to compose a poem based on the legend. Afterwards, Hilario Ascasubi wrote "Santos Vega o los Mellizos de la Flor", a long poem in which the minstrel narrates the events. Soon after, Eduardo Gutiérrez published the "Story of Santos Vega and his friend Carmona prosecuted by justice" as a feuilleton. Finally, Rafael Obligado, inspired on Gutiérrez's work, composed his best poem "Santos Vega", one of the top works of Argentine literature.

A 1936 film Santos Vega was released.

== Rafael Obligado ==
Rafael Obligado's poem is romanticist, because it emphasizes nature, twilight, nationalism, and the four elements. It is divided in four cantos: The Minstrel's Soul, The Minstrel's Wife, The Minstrel's Hymn and The Minstrel's Death. They don't follow a chronological order since the first two feature the "ghost" that inhabits the pampas, the fourth tells his last duel with the Devil; and the third one was a later addition in which Santos Vega (alive) interrupts a match of Pato and calls the gauchos to join the May Revolution.

== See also ==
- Juan Sin Ropa, 1919 film inspired by the legend.
