= Benito Lynch =

Argentine writer (1885–1951)

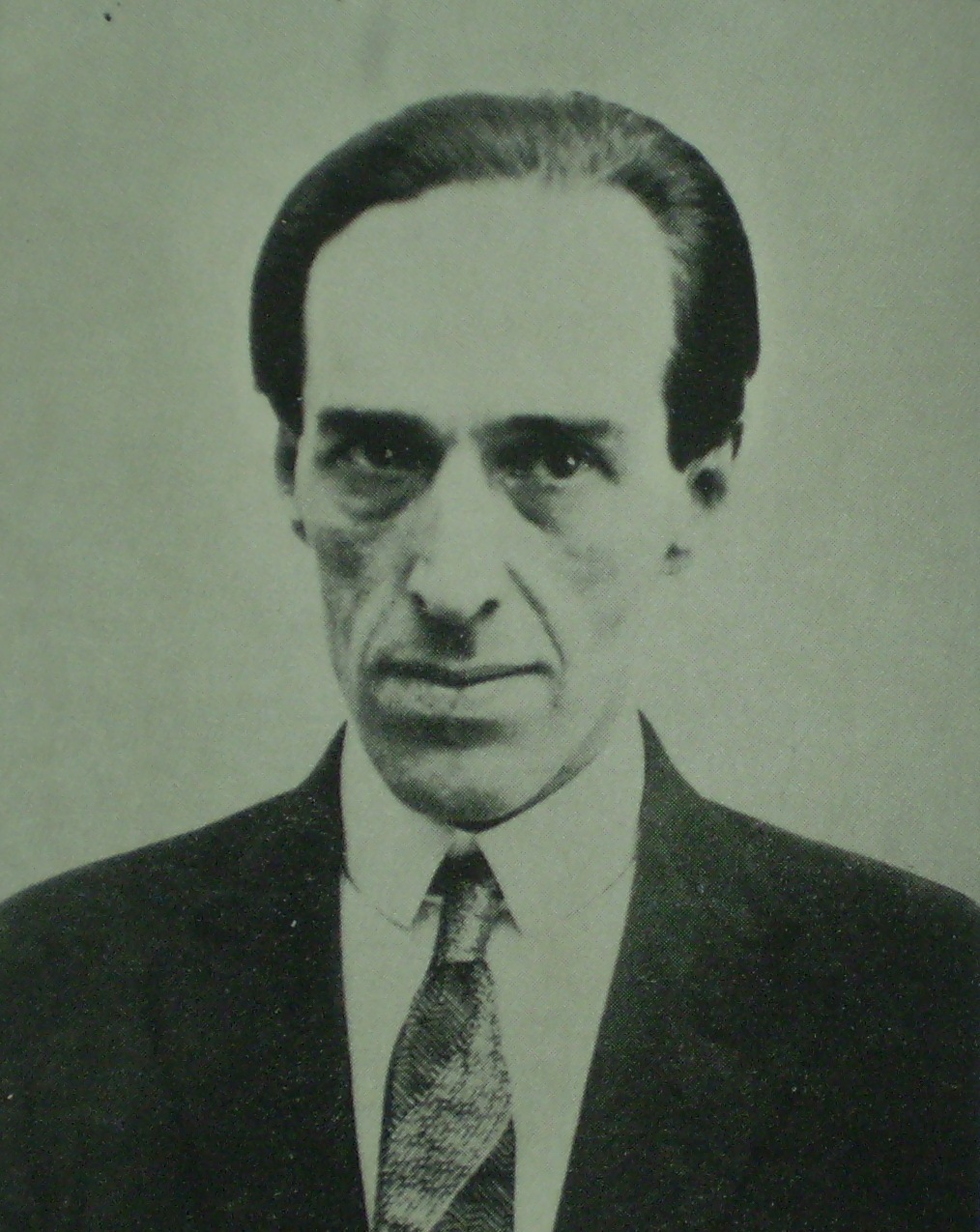
Benito Lynch.

Benito Eduardo Lynch Beaulieu (25 July 1885 – 23 December 1951) was an Argentine novelist and short story writer.

== Biography ==
Lynch was born in Buenos Aires. He came from a family of Irish origin who settled in the Río de la Plata region since the 18th century. They were descendants of Patrick Lynch from Galway. He spent his childhood and adolescence on the large country estate of his grandfather Ventura Lynch. After the estate was sold, the family settled in La Plata, the newly built capital of the Buenos Aires Province. Lynch was a lifelong recluse à la Emily Dickinson, living all his life with two unmarried sisters in a large old house in La Plata.

An eccentric, Lynch's quirky short stories have been often filmed and dramatized. He wrote more than a hundred of them, most of them in a neo-gauchoesque manner that sometimes evokes magic realism. He also strikes a genuinely and authentically popular vein.

He was also a sports fan. He played professional soccer in 1901. His club, Club de Gimnasia y Esgrima La Plata, was founded in 1887 and is now the oldest professional soccer club in America. He played in the first organized match recorded in La Plata. He died in 1951 in Mar del Plata, a seaside city in the Province of Buenos Aires, Argentina.

== Works ==
- Plata dorada (1909)
- The Caranchos of Florida (1916)
- Raquela (1918)
- Las mal calladas (1923)
- The Englishman of the Bones (1924)
- El antojo de la patrona (1925)
- Palo verde (1925)
- The Romance of a Gaucho (1930)
- De los campos porteños (1931)
- El estanciero (1931)
- Cuentos criollos (1940)

Many stories, some worthy of anthologizing, remain uncollected. They appeared in newspapers and reviews of the time such as La Nación, El Hogar, Mundo Argentino, Caras y Caretas and Leoplán.

== See also ==
- Argentine literature
