= Rafael Obligado =

Argentine poet and playwright

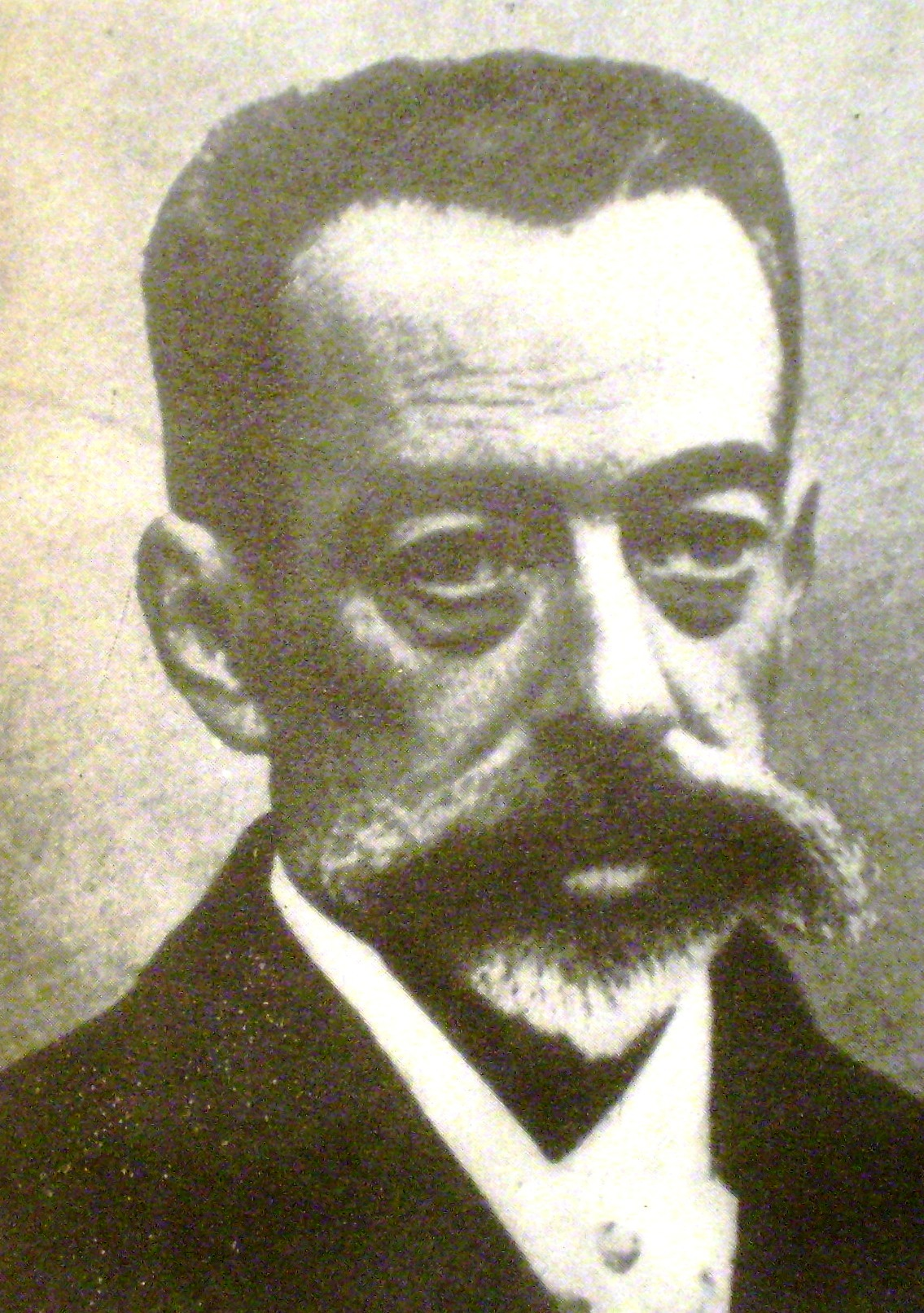
Rafael Obligado.

Rafael Obligado (27 January 1851 – 8 March 1920) was an Argentine poet, playwright and scholar.

== Biography ==
Born in Buenos Aires, Obligado was the son of María Jacinta Ortiz Urién and Luis Obligado y Saavedra. During the 1880s, he became known as el poeta del Paraná (the poet of Paraná River). He wrote poetry with gaucho themes, but using cultured and educated language. He was heavily influenced by contemporary French poetry, and became well known in Argentina for his poem Santos Vega, an ode to a gaucho-troubadour, a type of composer and performer known in Argentina under the name of payador.

He married Isabel Gómez Langenheim, and in 1896 commissioned a rural residence with a design based on her preference for the works of Sir Walter Scott, to evoke the settings described in Scott's works; the Rafael Obligado Castle, near Ramallo, Buenos Aires, is one of the premier estancias in the Pampas region.

Obligado was one of the founders of the Department of Philosophy and Literature of the University of Buenos Aires, where he served as the Assistant Dean on several occasions; in 1909 he was awarded an honorary doctorate by the university.

He died in Mendoza, Argentina, in 1920.

== Spanish wikisource ==
- Rafael Obligado (in Spanish)
