= Juan Moreira (disambiguation) =

Juan Moreira may refer to:

- Juan Moreira, a historic Argentine outlaw
- Juan Moreira (novel), an 1879 Argentine novel by Eduardo Gutiérrez
- Juan Moreira (1913 film), a silent Argentine film directed by Mario Gallo
- Juan Moreira (1936 film), an Argentine film directed by Nelo Cosimi
- Juan Moreira (1948 film), an Argentine film directed by Luis Moglia Barth
- Juan Moreira (1973 film), an Argentine film directed by Leonardo Favio

== See also ==
- Juan Morera (1947–2006), Spanish handball player
