= 1889 =

1889 in various calendars
- Gregorian calendar: 1889; MDCCCLXXXIX
- Ab urbe condita: 2642
- Armenian calendar: 1338; ԹՎ ՌՅԼԸ
- Assyrian calendar: 6639
- Baháʼí calendar: 45–46
- Balinese saka calendar: 1810–1811
- Bengali calendar: 1295–1296
- Berber calendar: 2839
- British Regnal year: 52 Vict. 1 – 53 Vict. 1
- Buddhist calendar: 2433
- Burmese calendar: 1251
- Byzantine calendar: 7397–7398
- Chinese calendar: 戊子年 (Earth Rat); 4586 or 4379 — to — 己丑年 (Earth Ox); 4587 or 4380
- Coptic calendar: 1605–1606
- Discordian calendar: 3055
- Ethiopian calendar: 1881–1882
- Hebrew calendar: 5649–5650
- Hindu calendars
- Vikram Samvat: 1945–1946
- Shaka Samvat: 1810–1811
- Kali Yuga: 4989–4990
- Holocene calendar: 11889
- Igbo calendar: 889–890
- Iranian calendar: 1267–1268
- Islamic calendar: 1306–1307
- Japanese calendar: Meiji 22 (明治２２年)
- Javanese calendar: 1818–1819
- Julian calendar: Gregorian minus 12 days
- Korean calendar: 4222
- Minguo calendar: 23 before ROC 民前23年
- Nanakshahi calendar: 421
- Thai solar calendar: 2431–2432
- Tibetan calendar: ས་ཕོ་བྱི་བ་ལོ་ (male Earth-Rat); 2015 or 1634 or 862 — to — ས་མོ་གླང་ལོ་ (female Earth-Ox); 2016 or 1635 or 863

1889 (MDCCCLXXXIX) was a common year starting on Tuesday of the Gregorian calendar and a common year starting on Sunday of the Julian calendar, the 1889th year of the Common Era (CE) and Anno Domini (AD) designations, the 889th year of the 2nd millennium, the 89th year of the 19th century, and the 10th and last year of the 1880s decade. As of the start of 1889, the Gregorian calendar was 12 days ahead of the Julian calendar, which remained in localized use until 1923.

== Events ==
=== January ===
- January 1
  - The total solar eclipse of January 1, 1889 is seen over parts of California and Nevada.
  - Paiute spiritual leader Wovoka experiences a vision, leading to the start of the Ghost Dance movement in the Dakotas.
- January 4 – An Act to Regulate Appointments in the Marine Hospital Service of the United States is signed by President Grover Cleveland. It establishes a Commissioned Corps of officers, as a predecessor to the modern-day U.S. Public Health Service Commissioned Corps.
- January 8 – Herman Hollerith receives a patent for his electric tabulating machine in the United States.
- January 15 – The Coca-Cola Company is originally incorporated as the Pemberton Medicine Company in Atlanta, Georgia.
- January 22 – Columbia Phonograph is formed in Washington, D.C.

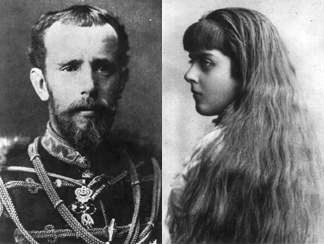
January 30: Suicide of Rudolf & Mary at Mayerling

- January 30 – Mayerling incident: Rudolf, Crown Prince of Austria, and his mistress Baroness Mary Vetsera commit a double suicide (or a murder-suicide) at the Mayerling hunting lodge in the Vienna Woods.

=== February ===
- February 11 – The Meiji Constitution of Japan is adopted; the 1st Diet of Japan convenes in 1890.
- February 15 – The first issue of the Filipino liberal newspaper La Solidaridad is published in Spain.
- February 17 – The Royal Society for the Protection of Birds is founded in Manchester (England), originally known as "The Plumage League" to campaign against the use of plumage in women's clothing.
- February 22 – President Grover Cleveland signs the Enabling Act of 1889, admitting North Dakota, South Dakota, Montana and Washington as U.S. states.
- February 25 – The landmark court decision in the case of The Moorcock establishes the concept of implied terms in English contract law.

=== March ===
- March 2 – The United States Congress proclaims the entire Bering Sea to be under US control.
- March 9 – Battle of Metemma: Yohannes IV, Emperor of Ethiopia, is killed; Sudanese forces, who have been almost defeated, rally and destroy the Ethiopian army. Yohannes is probably the world's last ruler ever to die in battle; on March 25 Menelik II proclaims himself as his successor.
- March 11 – The North Carolina Legislature issues a charter for the creation of Elon College.
- March 12 – Almon B. Strowger, an undertaker in Topeka, Kansas, files a patent in the United States for an automatic telephone exchange using the Strowger switch.
- March 15 – Samoan crisis: German and American warships keep each other at bay in a standoff in Apia Harbor, ending when a cyclone blows in and sinks them all.
- March 22 – English Association football team Sheffield United F.C. is formed at the Adelphi Hotel, Sheffield. They play their first match on September 7.
- March 23 – Claiming to be the Promised Messiah and Mahdi, Mirza Ghulam Ahmad founds the Ahmadiyya Muslim community in Punjab Province (British India).

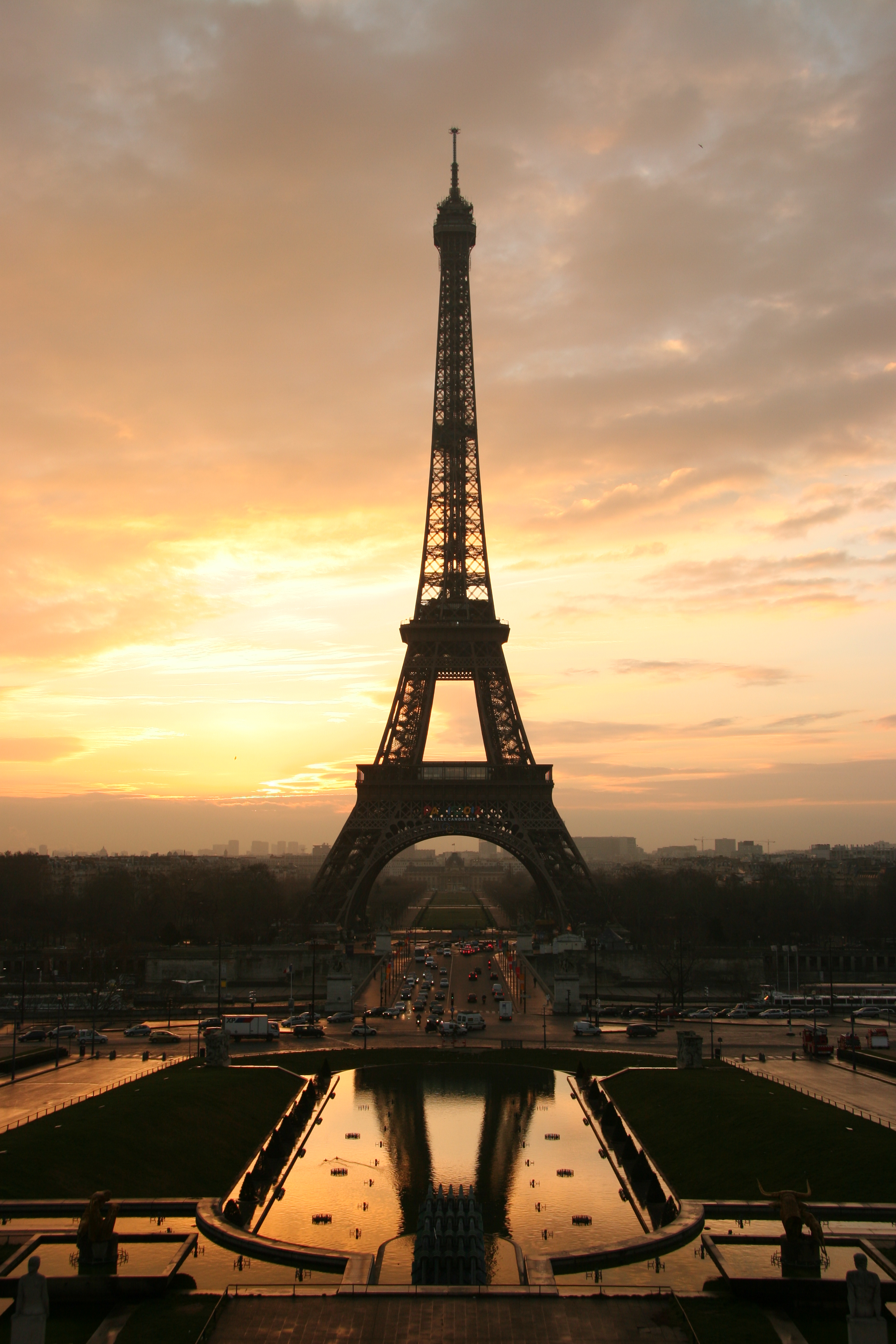
March 31: The Eiffel Tower is inaugurated, becoming the tallest structure in the world

- March 30 – Preston North End F.C. win the 1889 FA Cup final in England. Having on January 5 won the first Football League title with no defeats all season, they complete the double in Association football.
- March 31 – The Eiffel Tower is inaugurated in Paris (opens May 6). At 300 m (980 ft), its height exceeds the previous tallest structure in the world by 130 m (430 ft). Contemporary critics regard it as aesthetically displeasing.

=== April ===
- April 1 – Following a failure on January 27 to launch a coup, former French defense minister General Georges Boulanger flees to Brussels to avoid arrest for treason.
- April 10 – The Hammarby Roddförening (later Hammarby IF) sports club is founded in Sweden.
- April 20 – Birth of Adolf Hitler at Braunau am Inn in Austria-Hungary, the son of customs official Alois Hitler and his third wife, Klara.

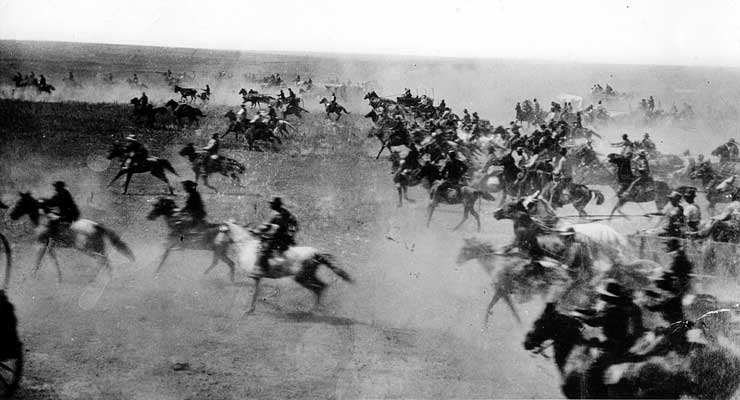
April 22: Oklahoma Land Run

- April 22 – At high noon in Oklahoma Territory, thousands rush to claim land in the Land Rush of 1889. Within hours the cities of Oklahoma City and Guthrie are formed, with populations of at least 10,000.
- April – British chemists Frederick Abel and James Dewar file their first patent for the smokeless propellant cordite.

=== May ===
- May 2 – Menelik II, Emperor of Ethiopia, signs a treaty of amity with Italy, giving Italy control over what will become Eritrea.
- May 6 – The Exposition Universelle opens in Paris, with the Eiffel Tower as its entrance arch. The Galerie des machines, at 111 m (364 ft), spans the longest interior space in the world at this time. The Exposition, which marks the centenary of the French Revolution, runs until October 31.
- May 11 – Wham Paymaster robbery: An attack upon a U.S. Army paymaster and escort in the Arizona Territory results in the theft of over $28,000, and the award of two Medals of Honor.
- May 28 – Rubber tire company Michelin is registered by Édouard and André Michelin in Clermont-Ferrand, France.
- May 31
  - Johnstown Flood: The South Fork Dam collapses in western Pennsylvania, killing more than 2,200 people in and around Johnstown, Pennsylvania.
  - The Naval Defence Act dictates that the fleet strength of the British Royal Navy must be equal to that of at least any two other countries.
- May – The first case of the 1889–1890 pandemic of is reported in the city of Bukhara in the Central Asian part of the Russian Empire.

=== June ===
- June 3 – The first long distance electric power transmission line in the United States is completed, running 14 miles (23 km) between a generator at Willamette Falls and downtown Portland, Oregon.
- June 6 – The Great Seattle Fire ravages through the downtown area without any fatalities.
- June 11 – A Neapolitan baker named Raffaele Esposito invents the Pizza Margherita, named after the queen consort of Italy Margherita of Savoy. This is the forerunner of the modern pizza.
- June 12 – The Armagh rail disaster: runaway carriages from a Sunday school excursion collide with an oncoming train near Armagh in the north of Ireland, killing 80, leading to rapid passage of the Regulation of Railways Act 1889 on railway signalling and brakes in the United Kingdom.
- June 26 – Bangui is founded in the French Congo.
- June 28 – The annular solar eclipse of June 28, 1889 is visible across the Atlantic Ocean, Africa and Indian Ocean, and is the 47th solar eclipse of Solar Saros 125.
- June 29–30 – First Inter-Parliamentary Conference held.
- June – Vincent van Gogh paints The Starry Night at Saint-Rémy-de-Provence.

=== July ===
- July 6 – Several aristocrats are implicated in the Cleveland Street scandal after police raid a male brothel in London.
- July 8
  - The first issue of The Wall Street Journal is published in New York City.
  - The last official bare-knuckle boxing title fight is held (under London Prize Ring Rules): Heavyweight Champion John L. Sullivan, the Boston Strong Boy, defeats Jake Kilrain in a world championship bout, lasting 75 rounds, in Mississippi.
- July 14 – International Workers Congresses of Paris open, and establish the Second International.
- July 15 – The Emperor of Brazil, Pedro II, survives an assassination attempt in Rio de Janeiro.
- July 31 – Louise, Princess Royal of the United Kingdom, marries Alexander Duff, 1st Duke of Fife, at Buckingham Palace in London.

=== August ===
- August 3 – Mahdist War: Battle of Toski – Egyptian and British troops are victorious.
- August 4 – The Great Fire of Spokane, Washington, destroys some 32 blocks of the city, prompting a mass rebuilding project.
- August 6 – The Savoy Hotel in London opens.
- August 10 – At the Vienna Hofburg, the grand opening ceremony is held for the Imperial Natural History Museum (German: K.k. Naturhistorisches Hofmuseum), begun in 1871; from August 13 to the end of December, the museum counts 175,000 visitors.
- August 14–September 15 – London Dock Strike: Dockers strike for a minimum wage of sixpence an hour ("The dockers' tanner"), which they eventually receive, a landmark in the development of New Unionism in Britain.
- August 26 – The Prevention of Cruelty to, and Protection of, Children Act, commonly known as the Children's Charter, is passed in the United Kingdom; for the first time it imposes criminal penalties to deter child abuse.
- August 30 – The Royal Mail Mount Pleasant Sorting Office officially opens in London.
- August – The Jewish settlement of Moisés Ville is founded in Argentina.

=== September ===
- September 10 – Albert Honoré Charles Grimaldi becomes Albert I, Prince of Monaco.
- September 17 – American Civil War veteran Charles Jefferson Wright founds New York Military Academy, with 75 students on 30 acres (120,000 m^{2}) of land in Cornwall, New York.

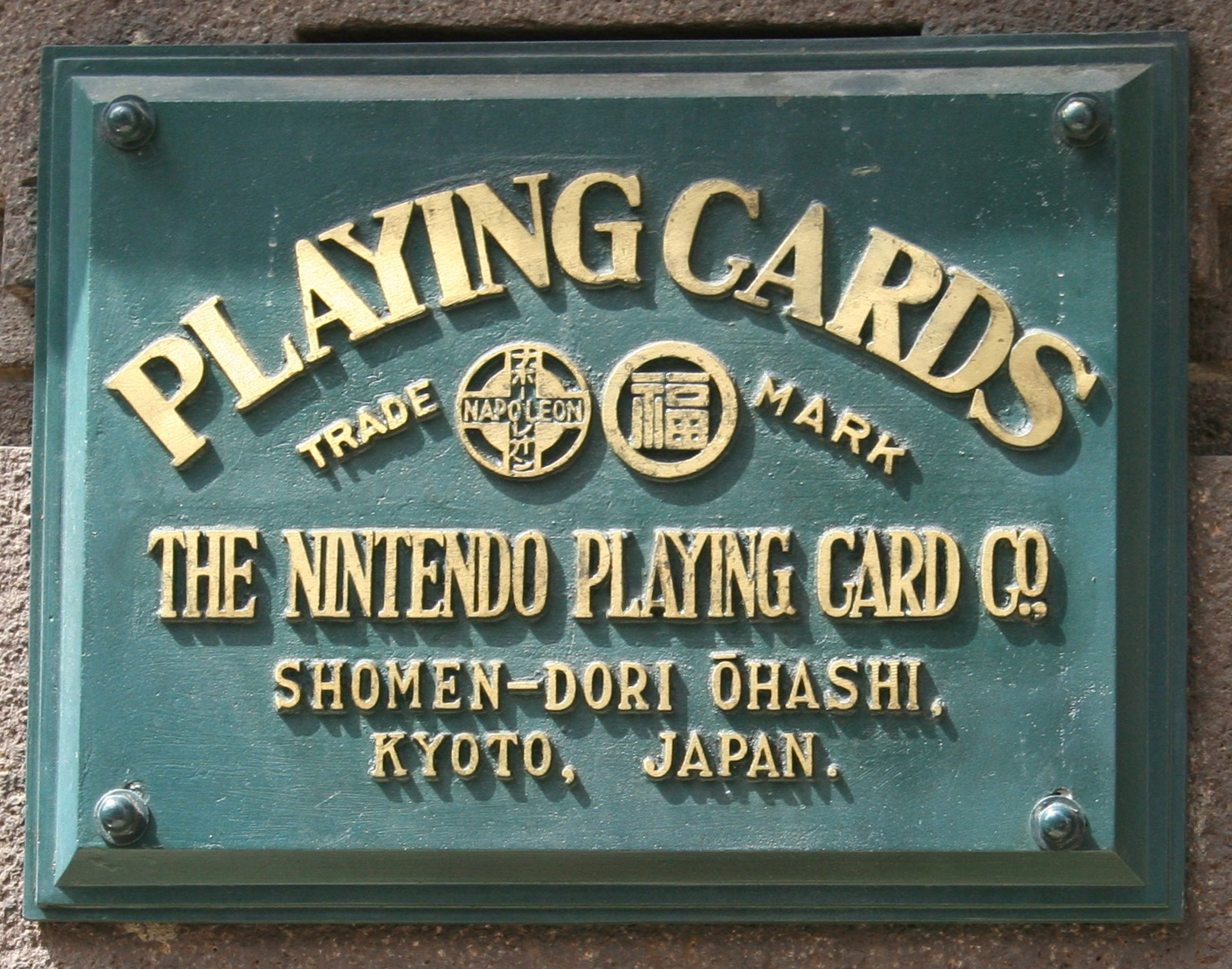
September 23: Nintendo founded as a playing card manufacturer

- September 23 – The Nintendo Koppai (later Nintendo Company, Limited) is founded in Japan by Fusajiro Yamauchi, to produce and market Hanafuda playing cards.

=== October ===
- October 2 – In Washington, D.C., the first International Conference of American States begins.
- October 6
  - Mount Kilimanjaro's summit is first reached, by German geologist Hans Meyer with Austrian mountaineer Ludwig Purtscheller.
  - The Moulin Rouge cabaret opens in Paris.
- October 12 – Gustaf Åkerhielm, previously Swedish Foreign Minister, replaces Gillis Bildt as Prime Minister of Sweden.
- October 21 – Field Marshal Helmuth von Moltke the Elder is recorded by Adelbert Theodor Wangemann, a German associate of Thomas Edison, on wax cylinders via phonograph. The two surviving wax cylinders that are produced make von Moltke, who was born in 1800, the earliest-living human whose voice has been recorded, and the only person born in the 18th century whose voice will be heard into the 21st.
- October 24 – Sir Henry Parkes, Premier of New South Wales, delivers the Tenterfield Oration, calling for the Federation of Australia.
- October 29 – The British South Africa Company receives a Royal Charter.

=== November ===
- November 2
  - North Dakota and South Dakota are admitted as the 39th and 40th U.S. states, respectively.
  - English Association football team Wimbledon F.C. plays their first match.
- November 8 – Montana is admitted as the 41st U.S. state.
- November 11 – Washington is admitted as the 42nd U.S. state.
- November 14 – Pioneer American woman journalist Nellie Bly (Elizabeth Cochrane) begins an attempt to travel around the world in less than 80 days, inspired by Jules Verne; she finishes the journey in 72 days, 6 hours and 11 minutes.
- November 15 – Field Marshal Deodoro da Fonseca organizes a military coup which deposes Emperor Pedro II of Brazil and abolishes the Brazilian monarchy. Deodoro da Fonseca proclaims Brazil a republic, and forms a provisional government.
- November 17 – The Brazilian Imperial Family is forced into exile in France.
- November 18 – Elisha P. Ferry is inaugurated as first governor of Washington.
- November 19 – The modern-day flag of Brazil is adopted by the Provisional Government of the Republic.
- November 20
  - Argentina is the first country to recognize the abolition of the monarchy in Brazil.
  - Gustav Mahler premieres his Symphony No. 1, in Budapest.
- November 23 – The first jukebox goes into operation, at the Palais Royale Saloon in San Francisco.
- November 27 – Clemson University is founded in Clemson, South Carolina.
- November 29 – FC Barcelona is founded in Barcelona, Catalonia.
- November – The first free elections are held in Costa Rica.

=== December ===
- December 14 – In U.S. college football, Wofford and Furman play the first intercollegiate football game in the state of South Carolina, starting the Furman–Wofford football rivalry.
- December 23 – The Spanish Association football team Recreativo de Huelva is formed (the oldest club in Spain by the 21st century).
- December 28 – The first interurban tram-train to emerge in the United States is the Newark and Granville Street Railway in Ohio.
- December 30 – Abdul Hamid II, Sultan of the Ottoman Empire, introduces the Kanunname of 1889 against the slave trade.

=== Undated ===
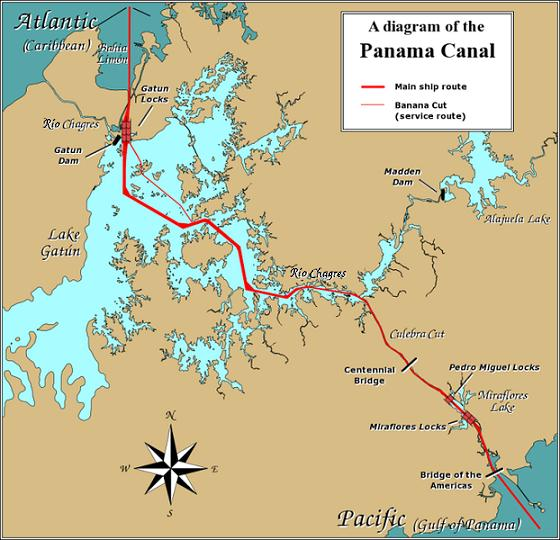
Panama, yellow fever

- Yellow fever interrupts the building of the Panama Canal.
- A huge locust swarm crosses the Red Sea and destroys crops in the Nile Valley.
- An early method of high-voltage direct current (HVDC) transmission, as developed by the Swiss engineer René Thury, is implemented commercially in Italy by the Acquedotto de Ferrari-Galliera Company. This system transmits 630 kW at 14 kV DC over a distance of 120 km (75 mi).

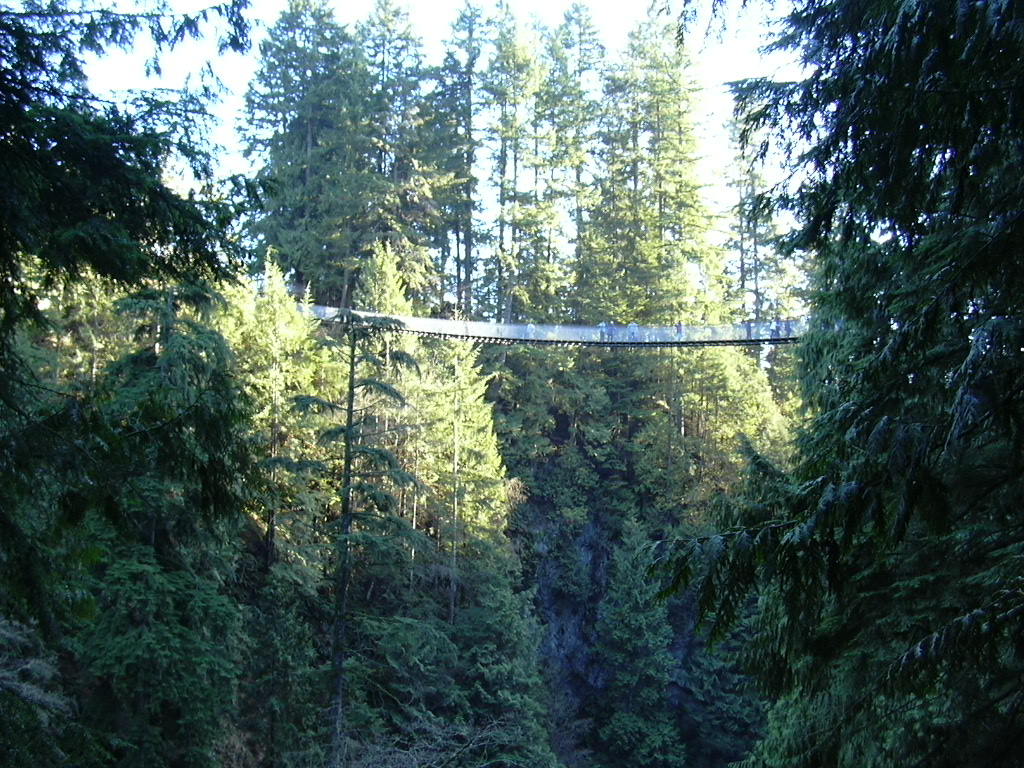
Capilano Bridge

- The Capilano Suspension Bridge (the longest suspension foot-bridge in the world) is opened in British Columbia.
- Arthur Wharton signs for Rotherham Town F.C. in England for the 1889/90 season, becoming probably the world's first black professional Association football player.
- The Wisden Cricketers' Almanack publishes its first Wisden Cricketers of the Year (actually titled Six Great Bowlers of the Year). The cricketers chosen are George Lohmann, Bobby Peel, Johnny Briggs, Charles Turner, John Ferris and Sammy Woods.

== Births ==
=== January ===
- January 2 – Walter Baldwin, American actor (d. 1977)
- January 12 – Mirza Basheer-ud-Din Mahmood Ahmad, 2nd Caliph of Ahmadiyya Muslim Community in Islam (d. 1965)
- January 21 – Edith Tolkien, English wife of, and inspiration for, J. R. R. Tolkien (d. 1971)

=== February ===
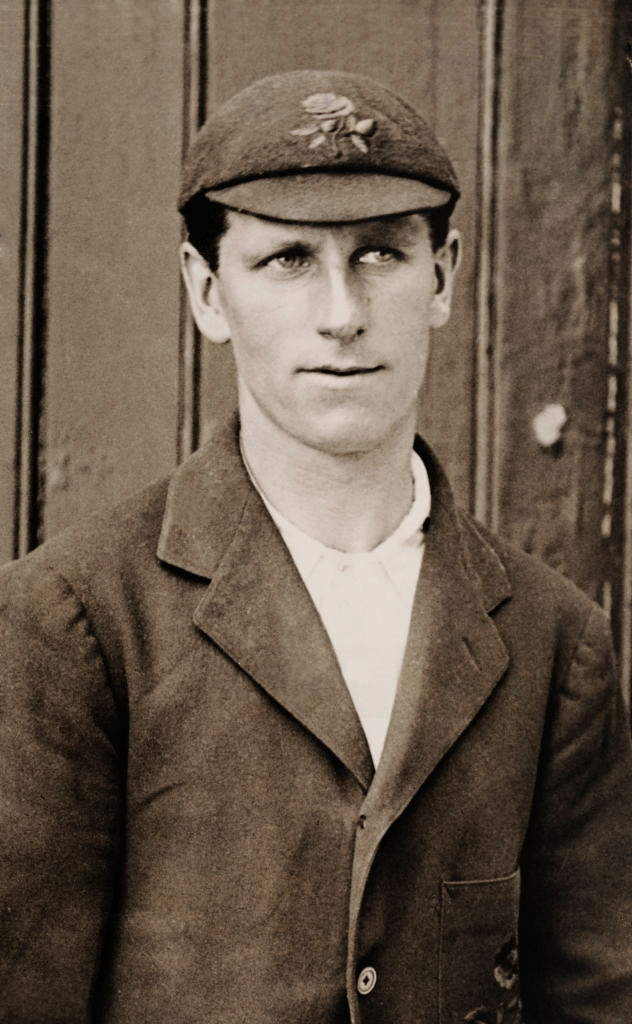
Ernest Tyldesley

- February 2 – Jean de Lattre de Tassigny, French general, posthumous Marshal of France (d. 1952)
- February 3 – Risto Ryti, Prime Minister and President of Finland (d. 1956)
- February 5 – Ernest Tyldesley, English cricketer (d. 1962)
- February 7 – Harry Nyquist, Swedish-American contributor to information theory (d. 1976)
- February 12 - Bhante Dharmawara, Cambodian-American Buddhist monk (d. 1999)
- February 16 – Hawthorne C. Gray, American balloonist (d. 1927)
- February 19 – Ernest Marsden, British physicist (d. 1970)
- February 21 – Pieter Voltelyn Graham van der Byl, South African politician (d. 1975)
- February 22
  - Olave Baden-Powell, English founder of the Girl Guides (d. 1977)
  - R. G. Collingwood, English philosopher and historian (d. 1943)
- February 23 – Victor Fleming, American motion picture director (d. 1949)
- February 25 – Homer S. Ferguson, American politician (d. 1982)

=== March ===
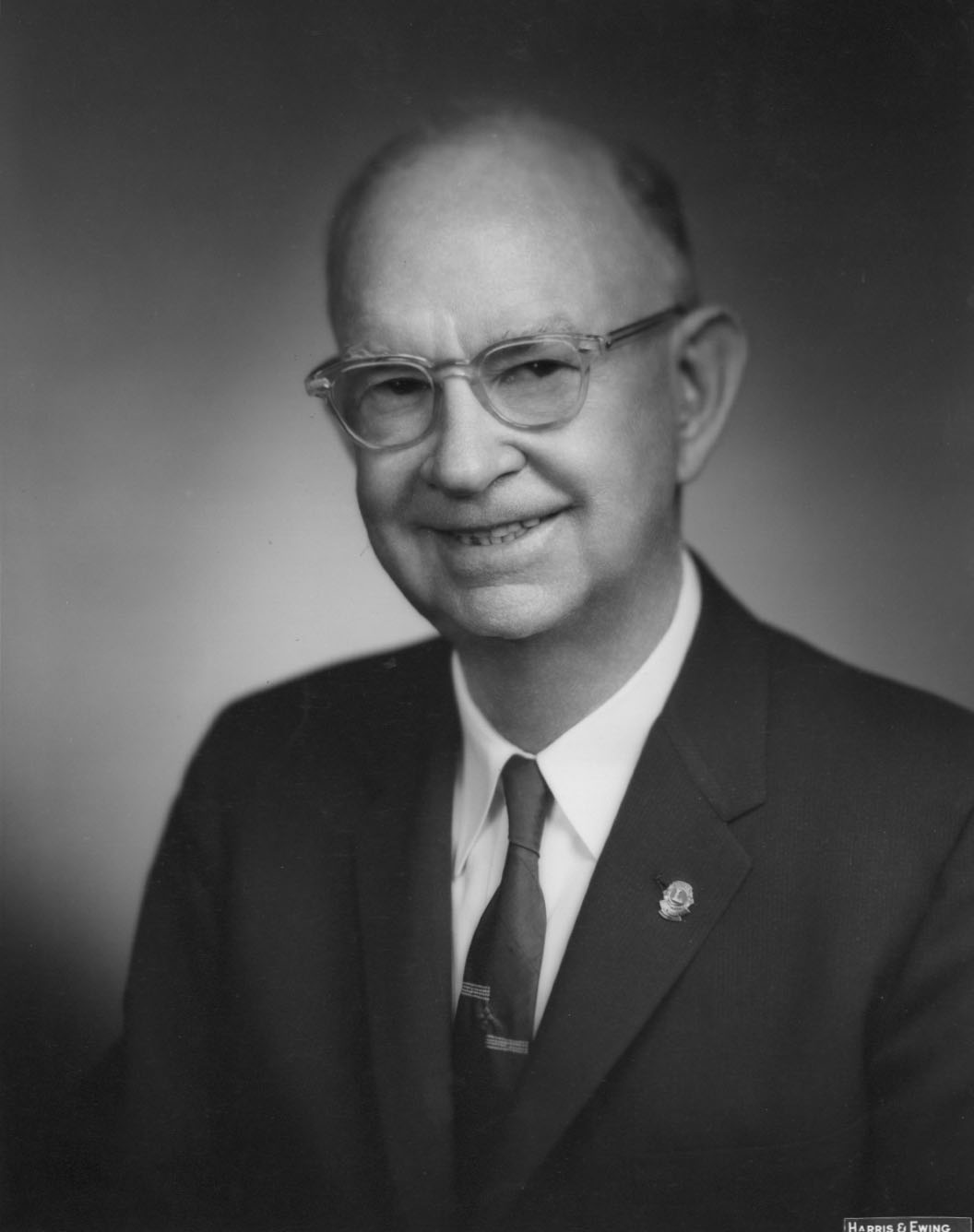
Oren E. Long

- March 1
  - Kanoko Okamoto, Japanese novelist, poet and Buddhist scholar (d. 1939)
  - Watsuji Tetsuro, Japanese philosopher (d. 1960)
- March 4
  - Oren E. Long, American politician, 10th Governor of Hawai'i (d. 1965)
  - Pearl White, American silent film actress (d. 1938)
- March 15 – Hiroaki Abe, Japanese admiral (d. 1949)
- March 16 – Reggie Walker, South African sprinter (d. 1951)
- March 21 –
  - Aleksandr Vertinsky, Russian singer, actor (d. 1957)
  - Bernard Freyberg, 1st Baron Freyberg, British army general and Governor-General of New Zealand (d. 1963)
- March 24 –
  - Albert Hill, British distance runner (d. 1969)
  - Jeanne Guiot, French engineer specialising in metallurgy (d. 11 July 1963)
- March 29 – Warner Baxter, American actor (d. 1951)
- March 30 – Herman Bing, German-American character, voice actor (d. 1947)

=== April ===
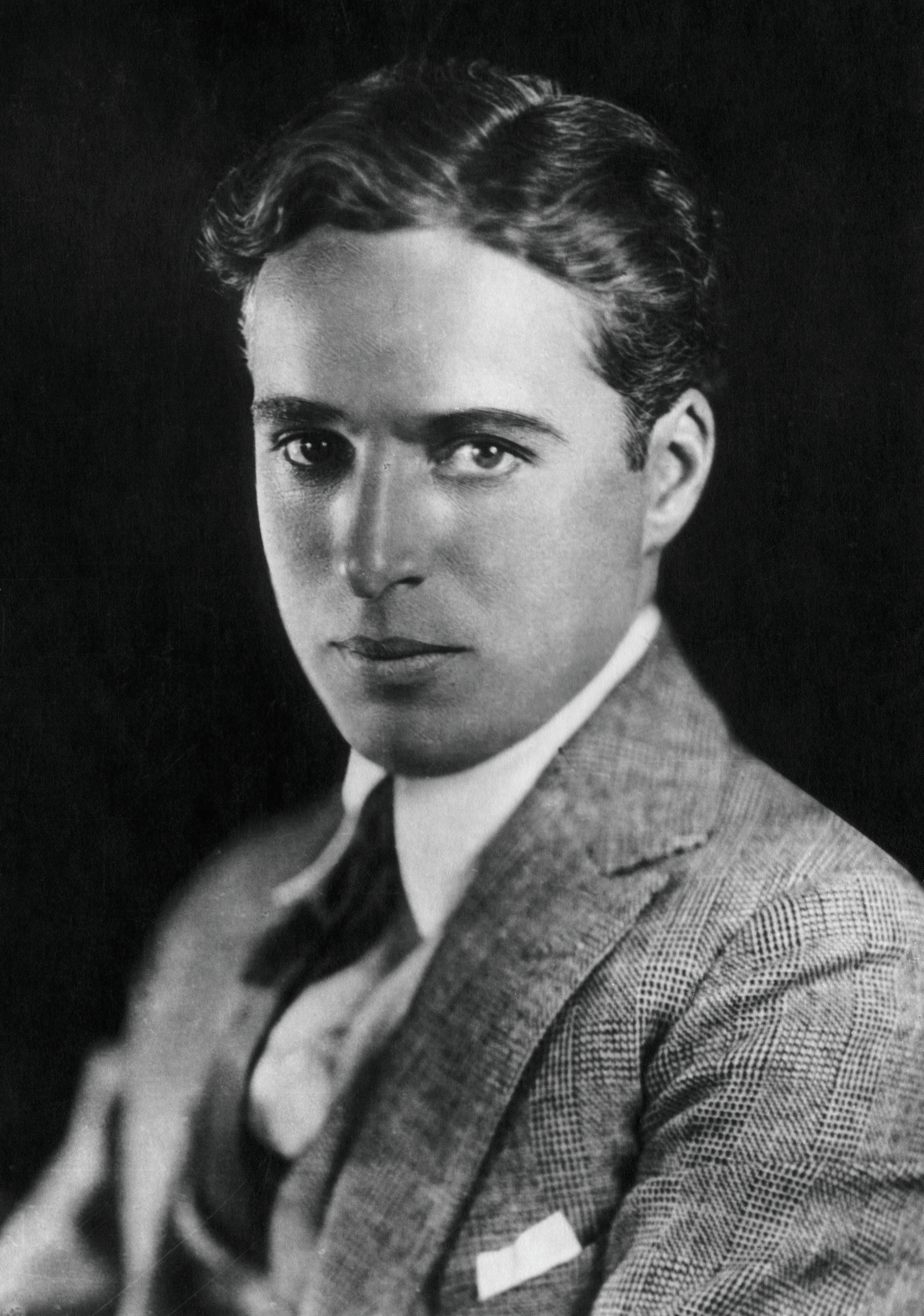
Charlie Chaplin

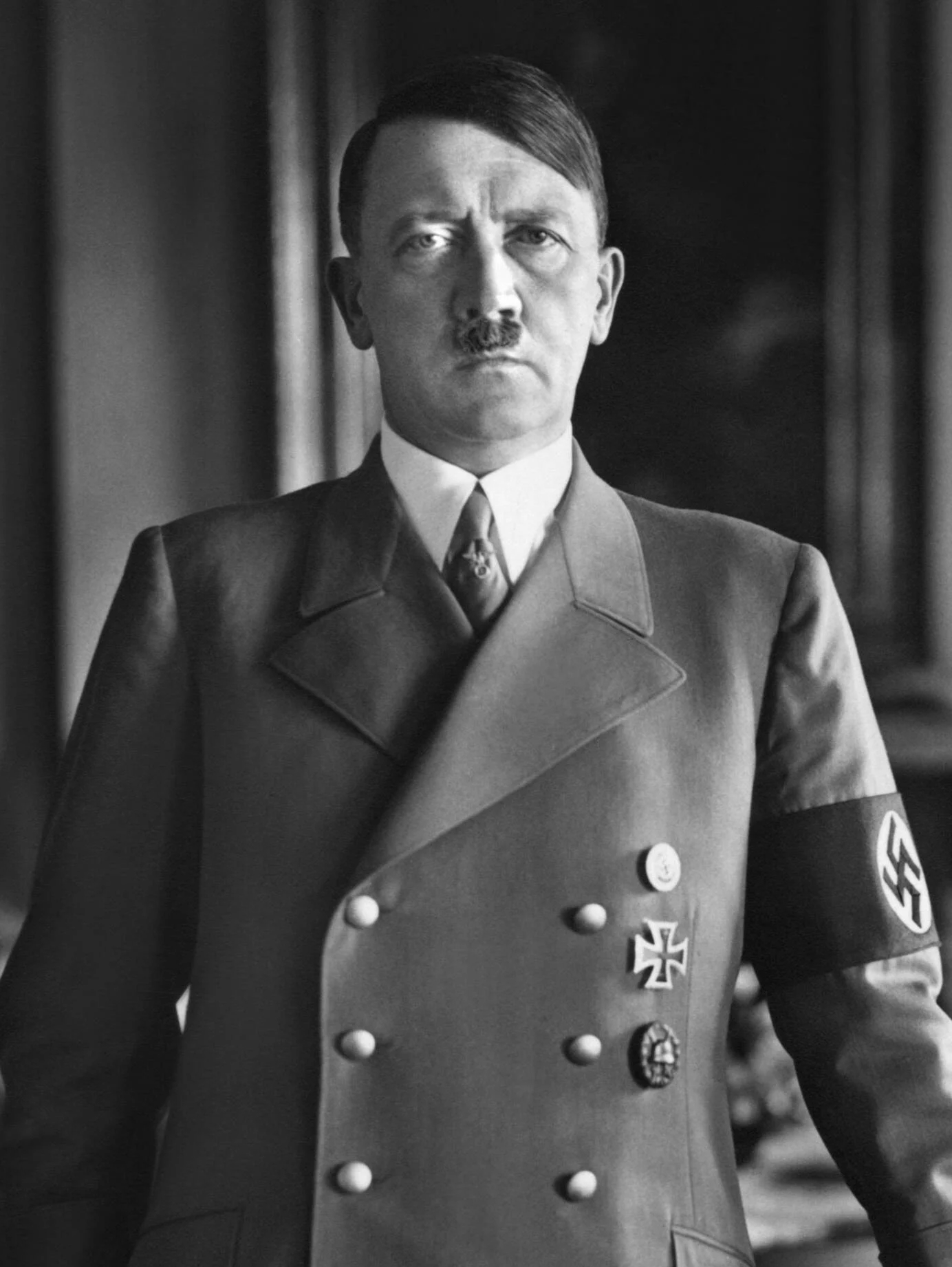
Adolf Hitler

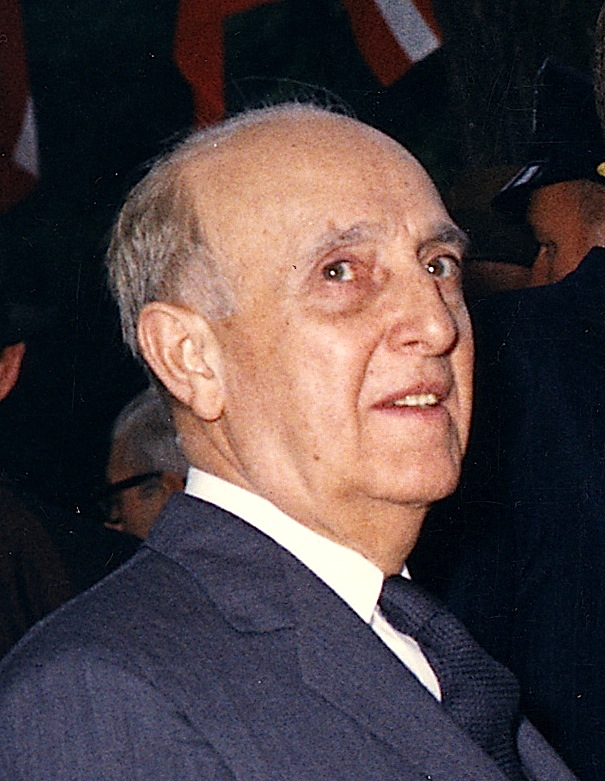
Manuel Prado Ugarteche

- April 4
  - Hans-Jürgen von Arnim, German general (d. 1962)
  - Angelo Iachino, Italian admiral (d. 1976)
- April 7 – Gabriela Mistral, Chilean writer, Nobel Prize laureate (d. 1957)
- April 8 – Adrian Boult, English conductor (d. 1983)
- April 11 – Nick LaRocca, American jazz cornetist (d. 1961)
- April 14 – Arnold J. Toynbee, English historian (d. 1975)
- April 15
  - Thomas Hart Benton, American painter (d. 1975)
  - A. Philip Randolph, African-American civil rights activist (d. 1979)
- April 16 – Charlie Chaplin, English comic actor, film director (d. 1977)
- April 20
  - Prince Erik, Duke of Västmanland, Swedish and Norwegian prince (d. 1918)
  - Adolf Hitler, Austrian-born dictator of Nazi Germany (suicide 1945)
- April 21
  - Paul Karrer, Swiss chemist, Nobel Prize laureate (d. 1971)
  - Manuel Prado Ugarteche, President of Peru (d. 1967)
- April 23 – Karel Doorman, Dutch admiral (killed in action 1942)
- April 26 – Ludwig Wittgenstein, Austrian-born philosopher (d. 1951)
- April 28
  - Takeo Kurita, Japanese admiral (d. 1977)
  - António de Oliveira Salazar, Portuguese dictator (d. 1970)
- April 30 – Fritz Pfeffer, German-Dutch housemate of Anne Frank (d. 1944)

=== May ===
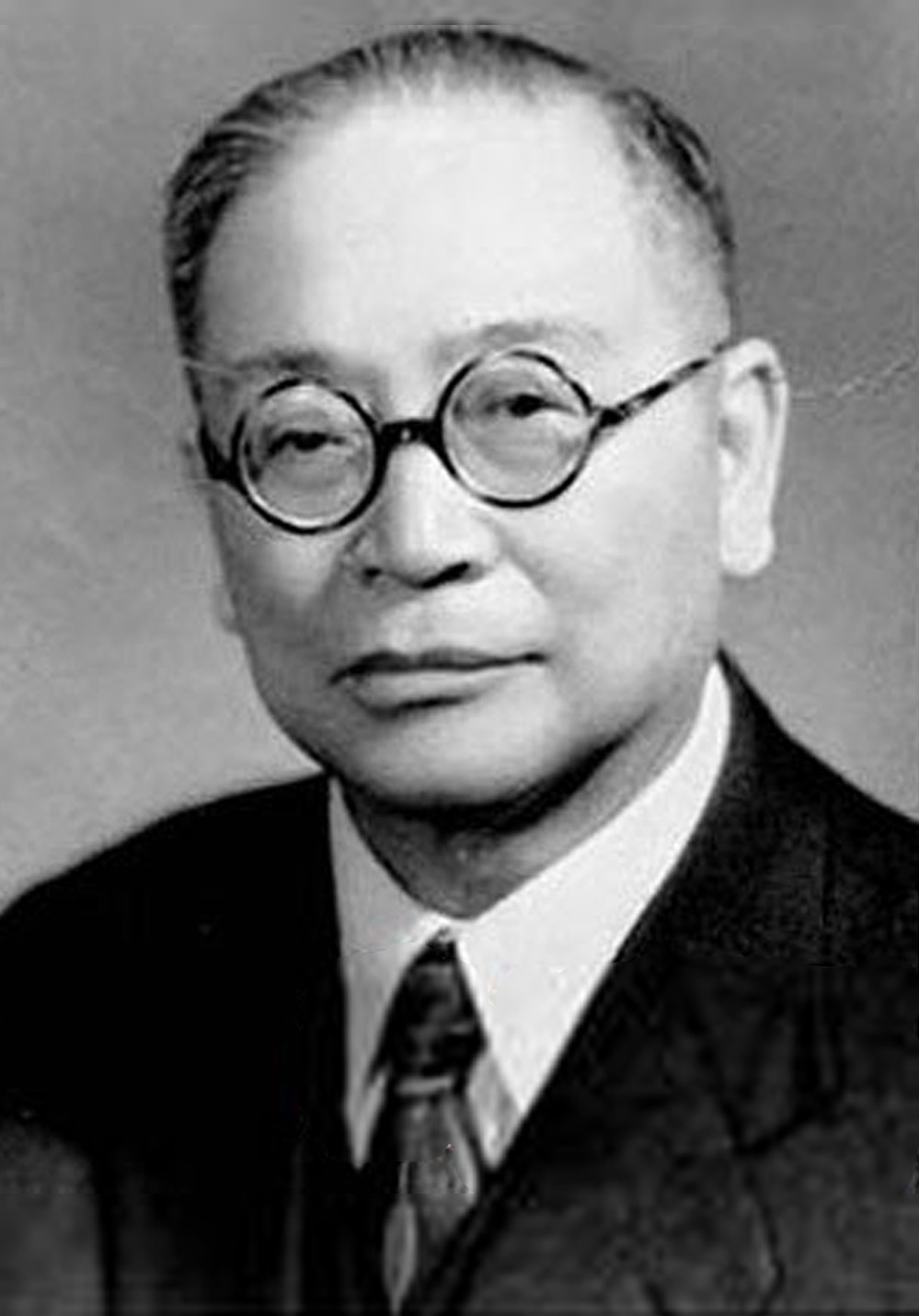
Ouyang Yuqian

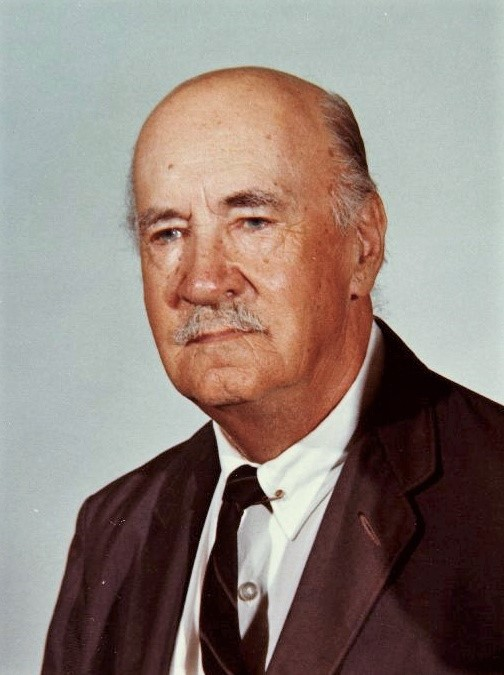
Igor Sikorsky

- May 3
  - Beulah Bondi, American actress (d. 1981)
  - Gottfried Fuchs, German-Canadian Olympic soccer player (d. 1972)
- May 12
  - Otto Frank, German publisher, businessman, father of Anne Frank (d. 1980)
  - Abelardo L. Rodríguez, Mexican professional baseball player, general and substitute President of Mexico, 1932–1934 (d. 1967)
  - Ouyang Yuqian, Chinese playwright, director and Peking opera performer (d. 1962)
- May 18 – Thomas Midgley Jr., American chemist, inventor (d. 1944)
- May 23 – Carlo Braga, Filipino Roman Catholic priest, archbishop and servant of God (d. 1971)
- May 25
  - Günther Lütjens, German admiral (d. 1941)
  - Igor Sikorsky, Russian developer of the helicopter (d. 1972)

=== June ===
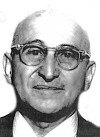
Beno Gutenberg

- June 2 – Martha Wentworth, American actress (d. 1974)
- June 4 – Beno Gutenberg, German-American seismologist (d. 1960)
- June 10 – Sessue Hayakawa, Japanese actor, film director (d. 1973)
- June 13
  - Amadeo Bordiga, Italian Marxist theorist, politician (d. 1970)
  - Gao Qifeng, Chinese painter (d. 1933)
  - Adolphe Pégoud, French acrobatic pilot, World War I fighter ace (killed in action 1915)
- June 21 – Ralph Craig, American sprinter (d. 1972)
- June 23 – Anna Akhmatova, Russian poet (d. 1966)
- June 25 – John Morton-Finney, American civil rights activist, lawyer and educator (d. 1998)
- June 27 – Moroni Olsen, American actor (d. 1954)

=== July ===
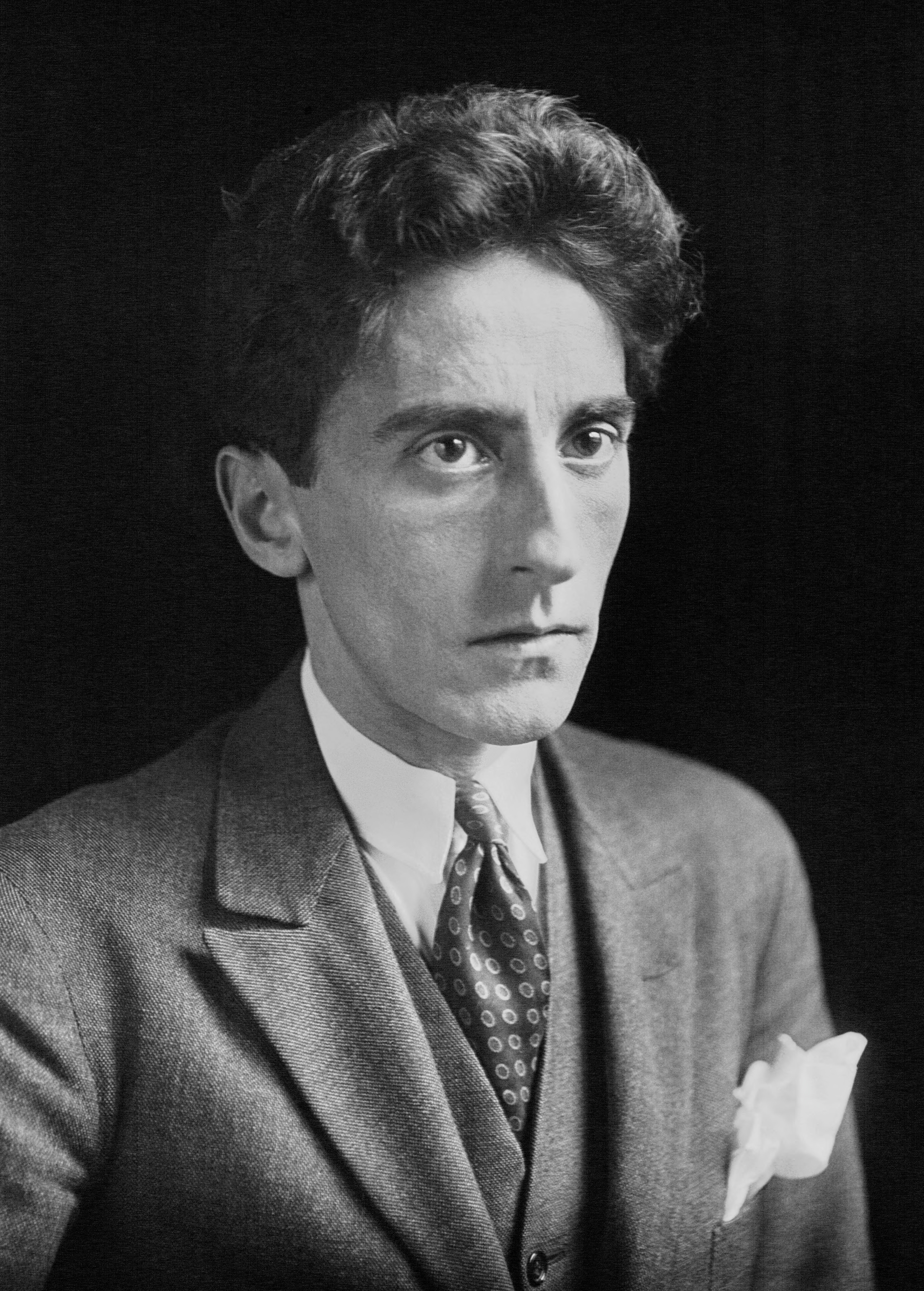
Jean Cocteau

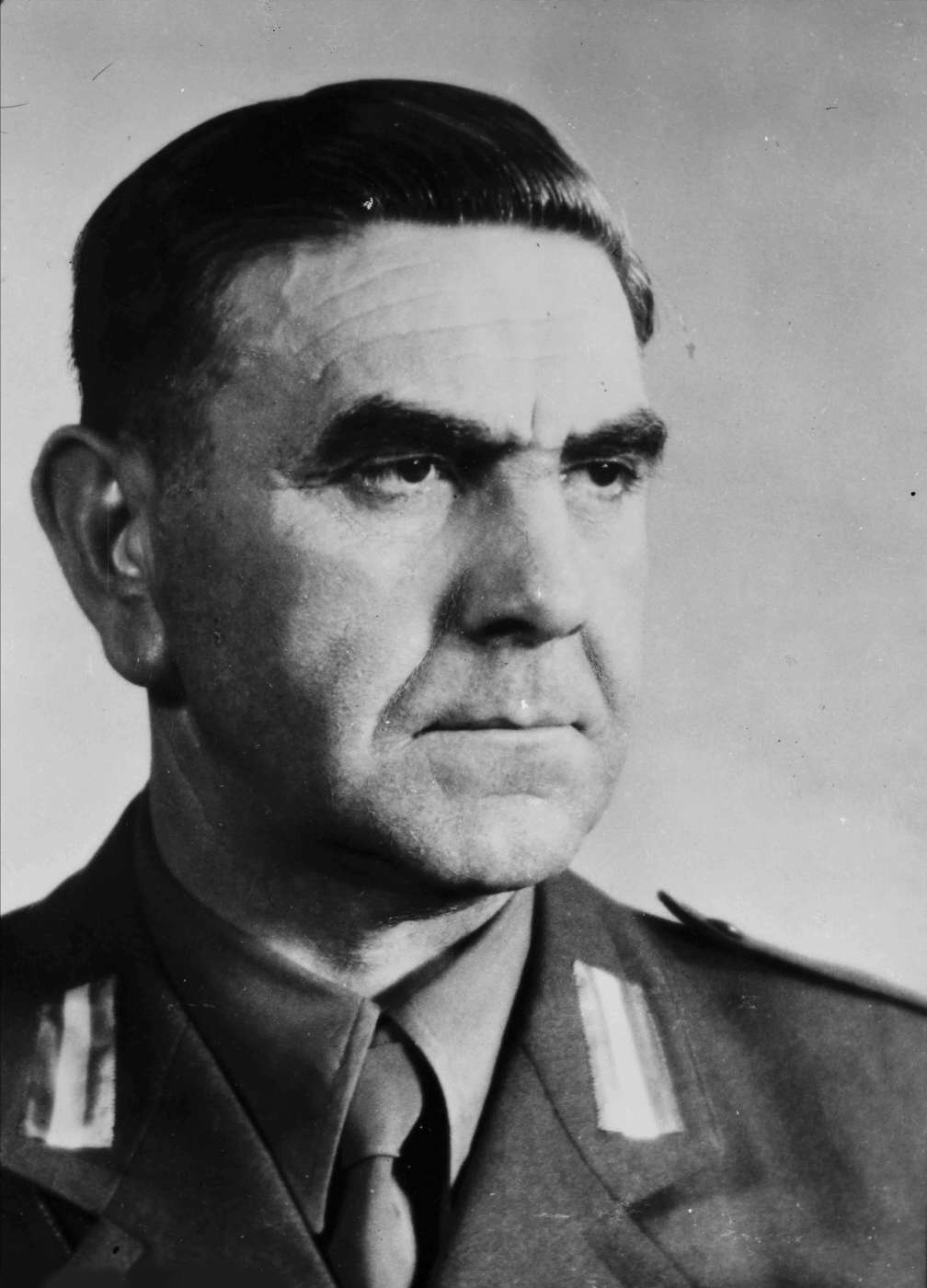
Ante Pavelić

- July 5 – Jean Cocteau, French writer (d. 1963)
- July 6 – Takeo Itō, Japanese general (d. 1965)
- July 7 – Shiro Kawase, Japanese admiral (d. 1946)
- July 8 – Eugene Pallette, American actor (d. 1954)
- July 14 – Ante Pavelić, Croatian fascist dictator (d. 1959)
- July 15 – Marjorie Rambeau, American actress (d. 1970)
- July 17 – Erle Stanley Gardner, American author (d. 1970)
- July 18 – Kōichi Kido, Japanese politician (d. 1977)
- July 22 – Tony Jannus, American aviator, aircraft designer (d. 1916)
- July 24 – Murray Kinnell, English actor (d. 1954)

=== August ===
- August 5 – Conrad Aiken, American writer (d. 1973)
- August 6 – George Kenney, World War II United States Army Air Forces general (d. 1977)
- August 10 – Norman Scott, American admiral, Medal of Honor recipient (killed in action 1942)
- August 11 – Ronald Fairbairn, Scottish psychiatrist and psychoanalyst (d. 1964)
- August 15 – Marthe Richard, French prostitute, spy and politician (d. 1982)
- August 21 – Sir Richard O'Connor, British general (d. 1981)
- August 25 – Ioan Dumitrache, Romanian general (d. 1977)
- August 29 – Alfredo Obviar, Filipino Roman Catholic bishop and Servant of God (d. 1978)

=== September ===
- September 7 – Albert Plesman, Dutch aviation pioneer (d. 1953)
- September 8 – Robert A. Taft, U.S. Senator from Ohio (d. 1953)
- September 12 – Ugo Pasquale Mifsud, 3rd Prime Minister of Malta (d. 1942)
- September 13 – Masao Maruyama, Japanese general (d. 1957)
- September 14 – María Capovilla, Ecuadorian supercentenarian, the last surviving person verified as born in 1889 (d. 2006)
- September 20 – Charles Reidpath, American sprinter (d. 1975)
- September 22 - Alice Golsen, German quantum physicist (d. 1940)
- September 26
  - Martin Heidegger, German philosopher (d. 1976)
  - Abdulkadir Inan, Bashkir/Turkish historian and Turkologist (d. 1976)

=== October ===
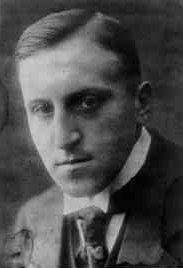
Carl von Ossietzky

- October 2 – Margaret Chung, Chinese-American physician (d. 1959)
- October 3 – Carl von Ossietzky, German pacifist, recipient of the Nobel Peace Prize (d. 1938)
- October 8 – Collett E. Woolman, American airline executive (d. 1966)
- October 10
  - Kermit Roosevelt, American explorer, author (d. 1943)
  - Han van Meegeren, Dutch painter, art forger (d. 1947)
- October 12 – Troy H. Middleton, American general and educator (d. 1976)
- October 13
  - Douglass Dumbrille, Canadian-born actor (d. 1974)
  - Cedric Holland, British admiral (d. 1950)
- October 20
  - Suzanne Duchamp, French painter (d. 1963)
  - Marie-Louise Paris, French engineer who founded l'Institut électro-mécanique féminin in 1925 (d. 1969)

=== November ===
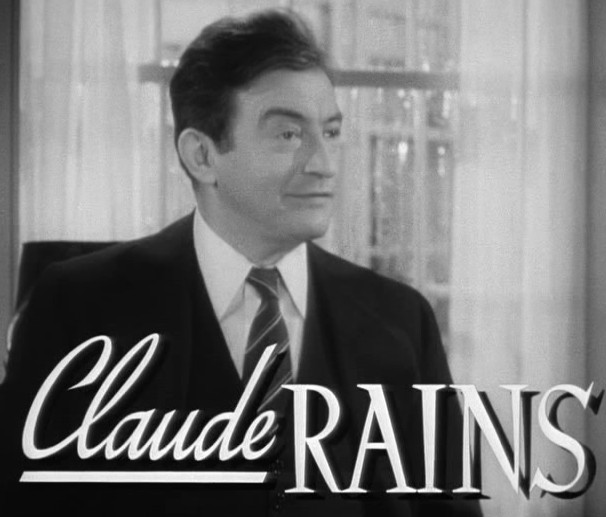
Claude Rains

- November 1 – Philip Noel-Baker, Baron Noel-Baker, Canadian-born peace activist, recipient of the Nobel Peace Prize (d. 1982)
- November 10 – Claude Rains, English-born American actor (d. 1967)
- November 12 – DeWitt Wallace, American magazine publisher (Reader's Digest) (d. 1981)
- November 14
  - Taha Hussein, Egyptian writer and intellectual (d. 1973)
  - Jawaharlal Nehru, 1st Prime Minister of India (d. 1964)
- November 15 – King Manuel II of Portugal (d. 1932)
- November 16 – George S. Kaufman, American playwright (d. 1961)
- November 18 – Zoltán Tildy, President of Hungary (d. 1961)
- November 19 – Clifton Webb, American actor, dancer and singer (d. 1966)
- November 20 – Edwin Hubble, American astronomer (d. 1953)
- November 23 – Alexander Patch, American general (d. 1945)
- November 25 – George McMillin, American admiral, last Naval Governor of Guam (d. 1983)
- November 30
  - Edgar Adrian, English physiologist, Nobel Prize laureate (d. 1977)
  - Shōji Nishimura, Japanese admiral (killed in action 1944)

=== December ===
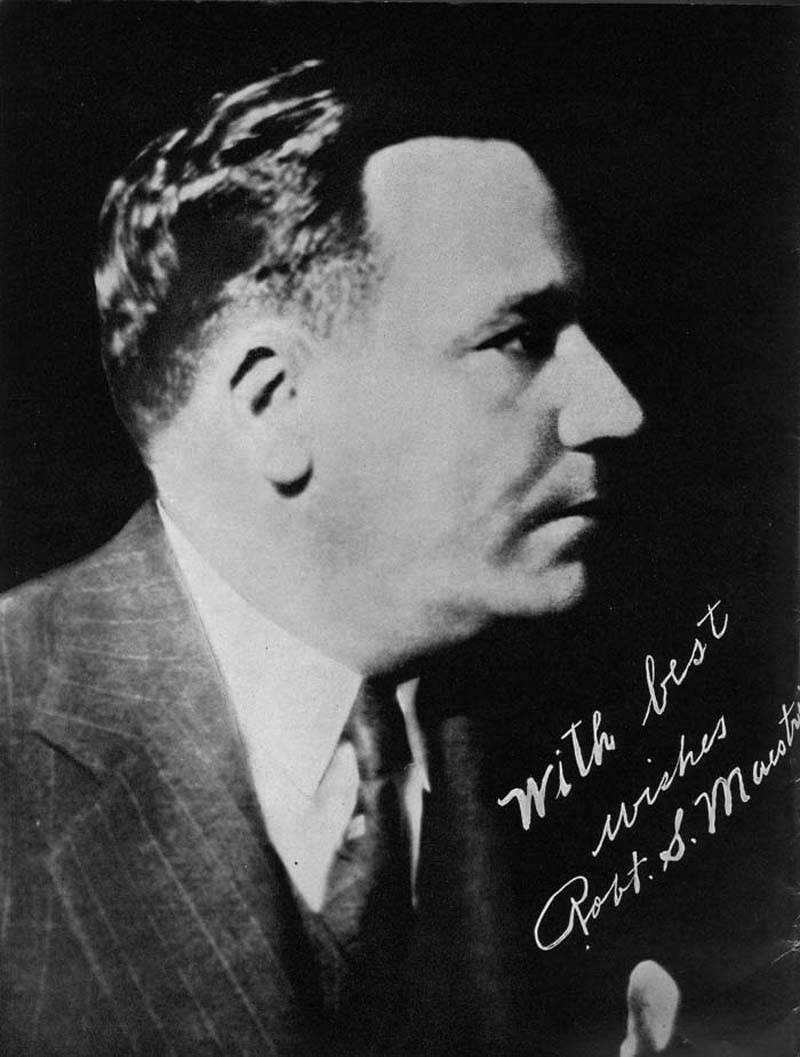
Robert Maestri

- December 1 – Vasily Blyukher, Soviet general, Marshal of the Soviet Union (k. 1938)
- December 2 – Oei Hui-lan (Madame Wellington Koo), Chinese-Indonesian socialite and First Lady of the Republic of China (d. 1992)
- December 3 – Walton Walker, American general (d. 1950)
- December 4 – Isabel Randolph, American actress (d. 1973)
- December 9
  - Shigeyoshi Inoue, Japanese admiral (d. 1975)
  - Hannes Kolehmainen, Finnish Olympic distance runner (d. 1966)
- December 11 – Robert Maestri, 53rd Mayor of New Orleans (d. 1974)
- December 23 – Daniel E. Barbey, American admiral (d. 1969)
- December 30 – Adolfo Ruiz Cortines, 47th President of Mexico (d. 1973)

=== Date unknown ===
- Nezihe Muhiddin, Turkish women's rights activist, suffragette, journalist, writer and political leader (d. 1958)

== Deaths ==
=== January–June ===
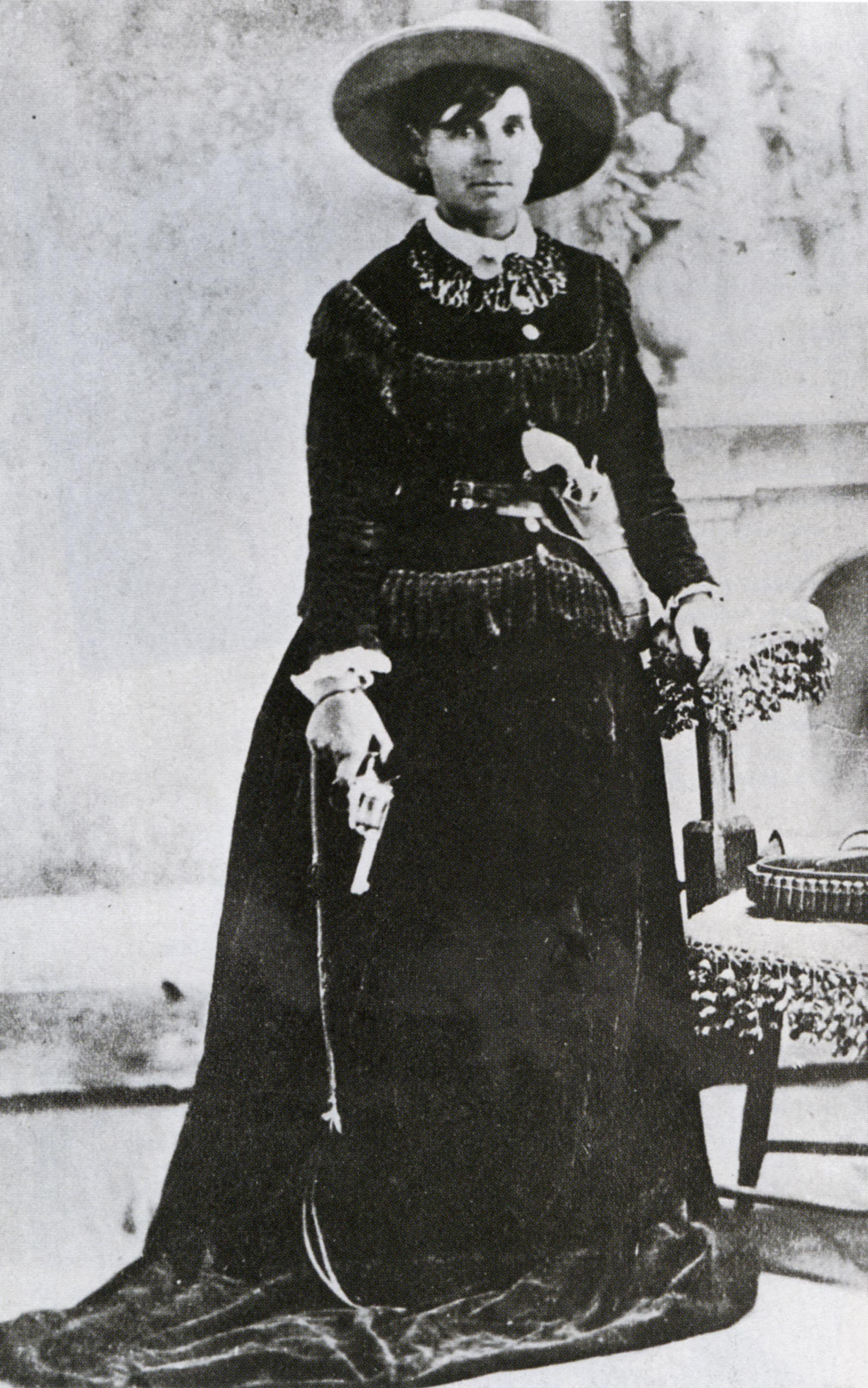
Belle Starr

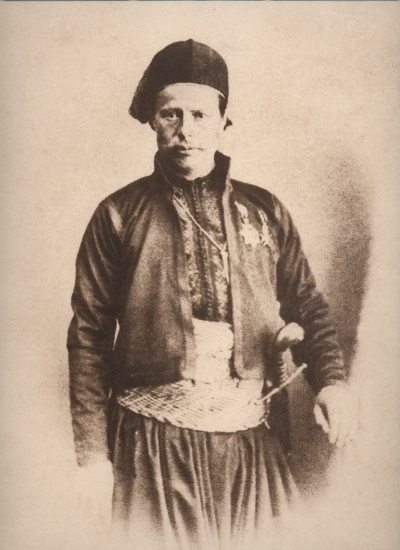
Youssef Bey Karam

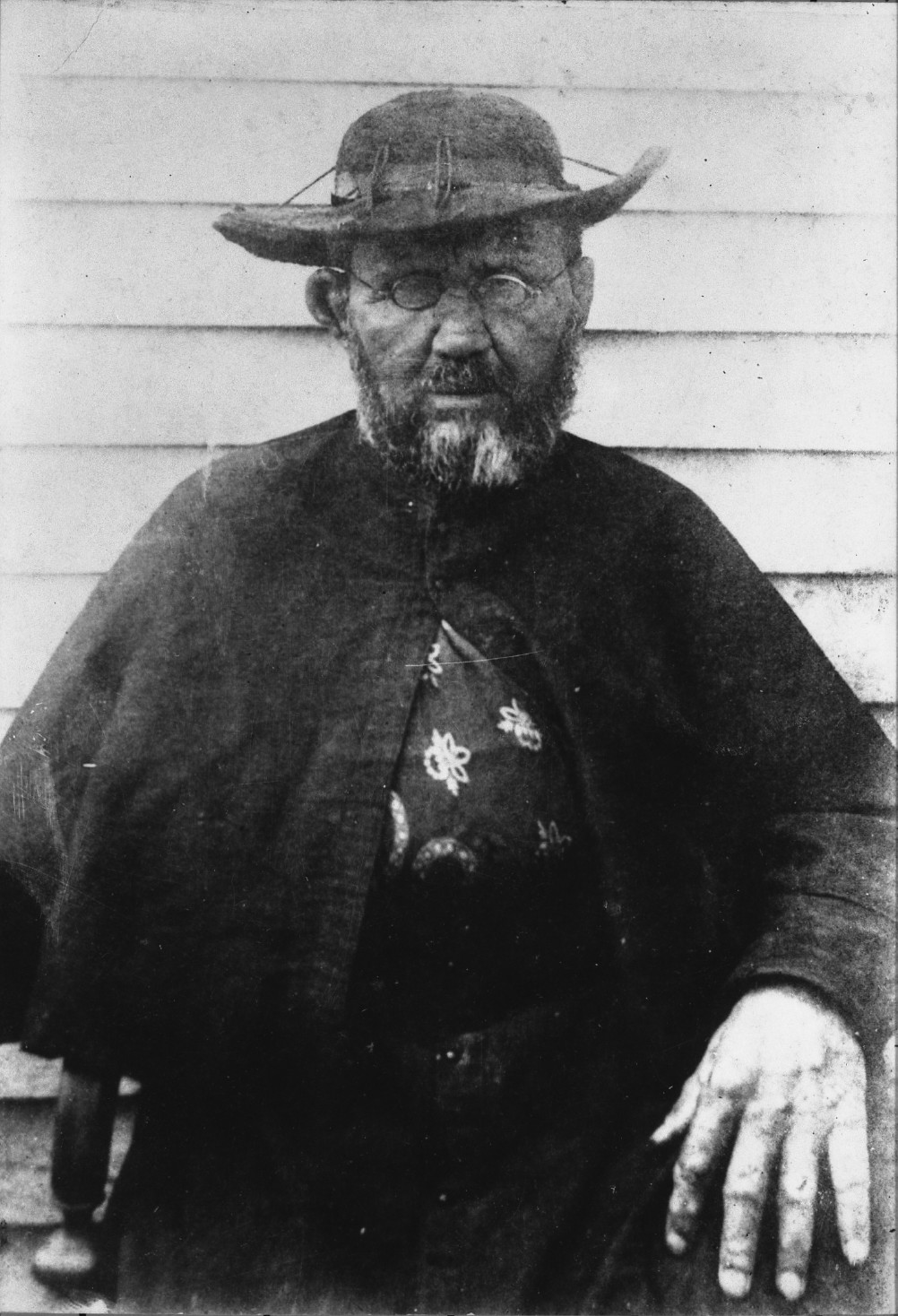
Father Damien

- January 13 – Solomon Bundy, American politician (b. 1823)
- January 22 – Carlo Pellegrini, Italian-born caricaturist (b. 1839)
- January 30 – Mayerling incident (suicide)
  - Rudolf, Crown Prince of Austria (b. 1858)
  - Baroness Mary Vetsera (b. 1871)
- February 3 – Belle Starr, American outlaw (murdered) (b. 1848)
- February 13 – João Maurício Vanderlei, Baron of Cotegipe, Brazilian magistrate and politician (b. 1815)
- March 5 – Mary Louise Booth, American editor-in-chief of Harper's Bazaar (b. 1831)
- March 8 – John Ericsson, Swedish inventor, engineer (b. 1803)
- March 9 – Emperor Yohannes IV of Ethiopia (b. 1837)
- March 13 – Felice Varesi, French-born Italian baritone (b. 1813)
- March 22 – Stanley Matthews, American judge and politician (b. 1824)
- March 24 – The Leatherman, possibly French-Canadian vagabond in the U.S. (b. c. 1839)
- March 28 – Ram Singh, Raja of Bundi. (b. 1811)
- April 6 – Princess Augusta of Hesse-Kassel (b. 1797)
- April 7 – Youssef Bey Karam, Lebanese nationalist leader (b. 1823)
- April 9 – Michel Eugène Chevreul, French chemist (b. 1786)
- April 12 – Robert Dunsmuir, Scottish-born Canadian industrialist and politician (b. 1825)
- April 15 – Father Damien, Belgian Roman Catholic priest, missionary to Hawaiians with leprosy, and saint (b. 1840)
- April 21 – Sebastián Lerdo de Tejada, Mexican jurist, 27th President of Mexico (b. 1823)
- April 25 – Mary Dominis, American settler of Hawaii (b. 1803)
- May 9 – William S. Harney, U.S. Army general (b. 1800)
- May 10 – Mikhail Saltykov-Shchedrin, Russian satirist (b. 1826)
- May 14 – Volney E. Howard, American politician (b. 1809)
- May 28 – Madeleine Vinton Dahlgren, American translator and anti-suffragist (b. 1825)
- June 8 – Gerard Manley Hopkins, English poet (b. 1844)
- June 10 – Abraham Hochmuth, Hungarian rabbi (b. 1816)
- June 15 – Mihai Eminescu, Romanian poet (b. 1850)
- June 25 – Lucy Webb Hayes, First Lady of the United States (b. 1831)

=== July–December ===
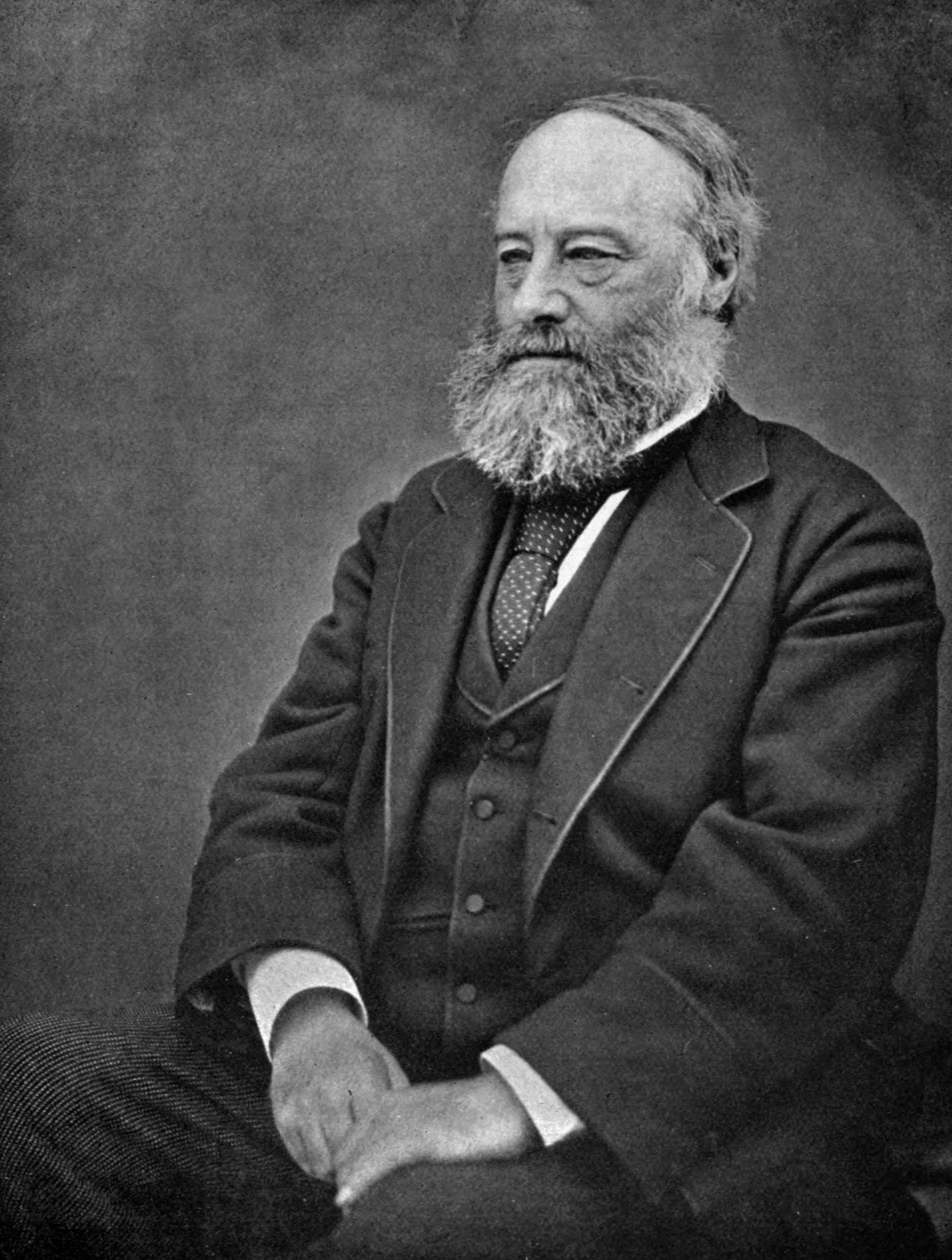
James Prescott Joule

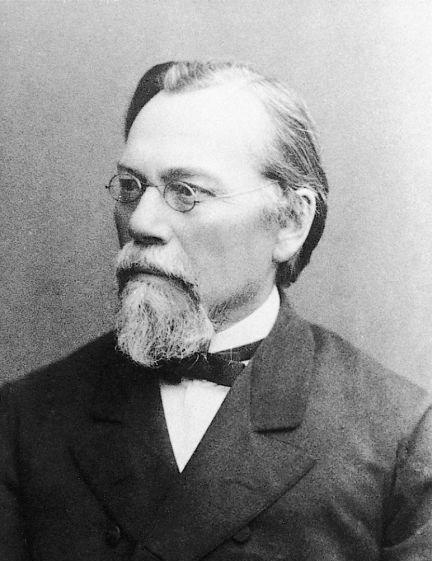
August Ahlqvist

- July 4 – Susan Catherine Koerner Wright, mother of the Wright Brothers (b. 1831)
- July 7 – Giovanni Bottesini, Italian conductor, composer and virtuoso double bass player (b. 1821)
- July 10 – Julia Gardiner Tyler, First Lady of the United States (b. 1820)
- August 2 – Eduardo Gutiérrez, Argentinian author (b. 1851)
- August 19 – Auguste Villiers de l'Isle-Adam, French writer (b. 1838)
- September 23 – Wilkie Collins, English novelist (b. 1824)
- September 24 – Charles Leroux, American balloonist, parachutist (b. 1856)
- September 29 – Louis Faidherbe, French general and colonial administrator (b. 1818)
- October 10 – Adolf von Henselt, German pianist and composer (b. 1814)
- October 11 – James Prescott Joule, English physicist (b. 1818)
- October 17
  - Rodrigo Augusto da Silva, Brazilian Senator, author of the Golden Law (b. 1833)
  - John F. Hartranft, Union Army officer, Medal of Honour recipient (b. 1830)
- October 19 – King Luís I of Portugal (b. 1838)
- October 25 – Émile Augier, French dramatist (b. 1820)
- November 16 – Sergei Bobokhov, Russian revolutionary, commits suicide as a protest against the flogging of a woman comrade in Siberia (b. 1858)
- November 18 – William Allingham, Irish author (b. 1824)
- November 20 – August Ahlqvist, Finnish professor, poet, scholar of the Finno-Ugric languages, author and literary critic (b. 1826)
- November 24 – George H. Pendleton, American politician (b. 1825)
- December 6 – Jefferson Davis, President of the Confederate States of America (b. 1808)
- December 12 – Robert Browning, English poet (b. 1812)
- December 20 – George F. Durand, Canadian architect (b. 1850)
- December 28 – Teresa Cristina of the Two Sicilies, Empress consort of Brazil (b. 1822)
- December 29
  - Glele, King of Dahomey (suicide)
  - Priscilla Cooper Tyler, de facto First Lady of the United States (b. 1816)
- December 30 – Sir Henry Yule, Scottish orientalist (b. 1820)
- December 31 – Ion Creangă, Romanian writer (b. 1837 or 1839)

== Further reading and year books ==
- 1889 Annual Cyclopedia online, Highly detailed global coverage
