= Patrocinio Díaz =

Argentine singer and actress

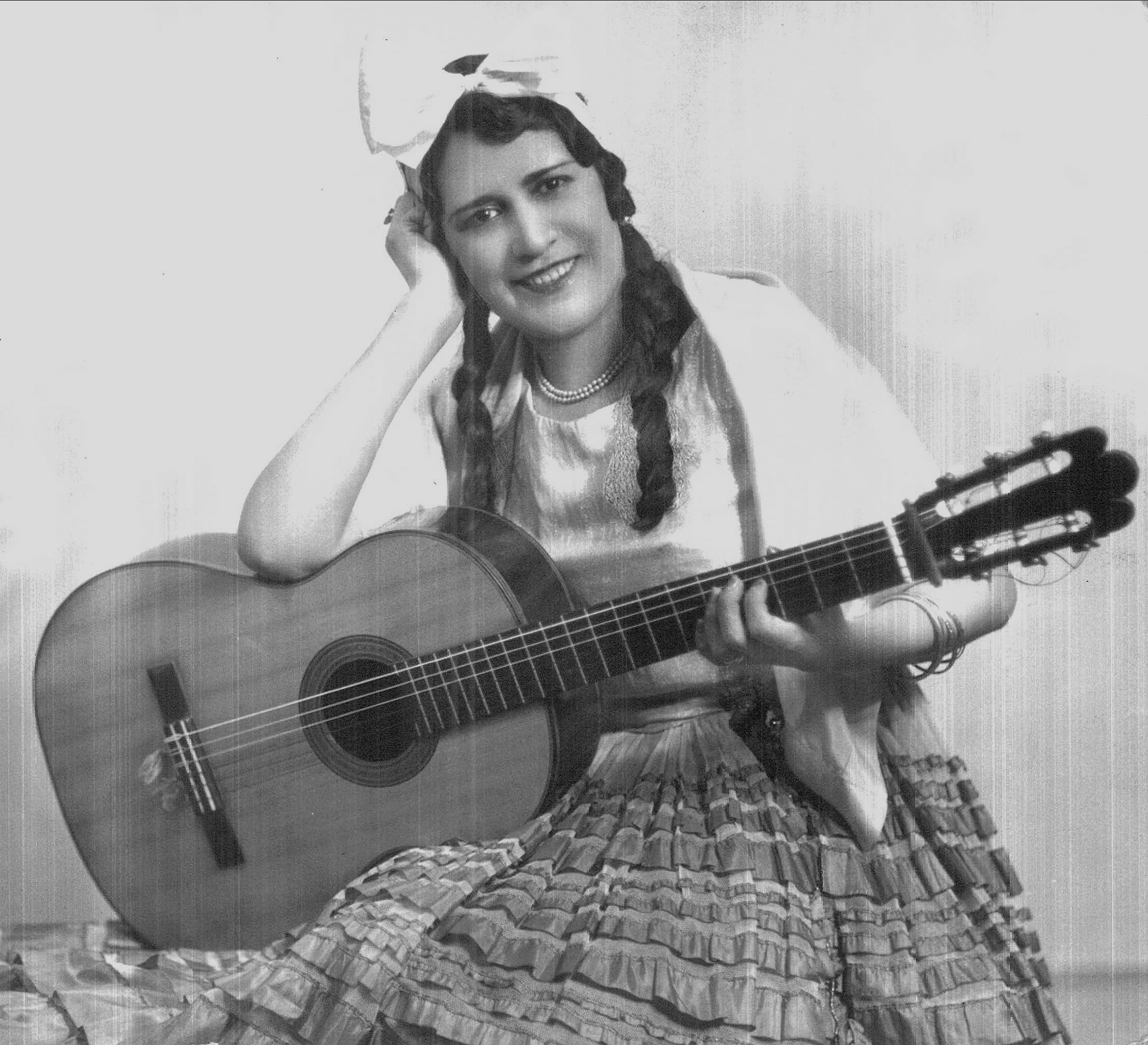
Díaz in 1933

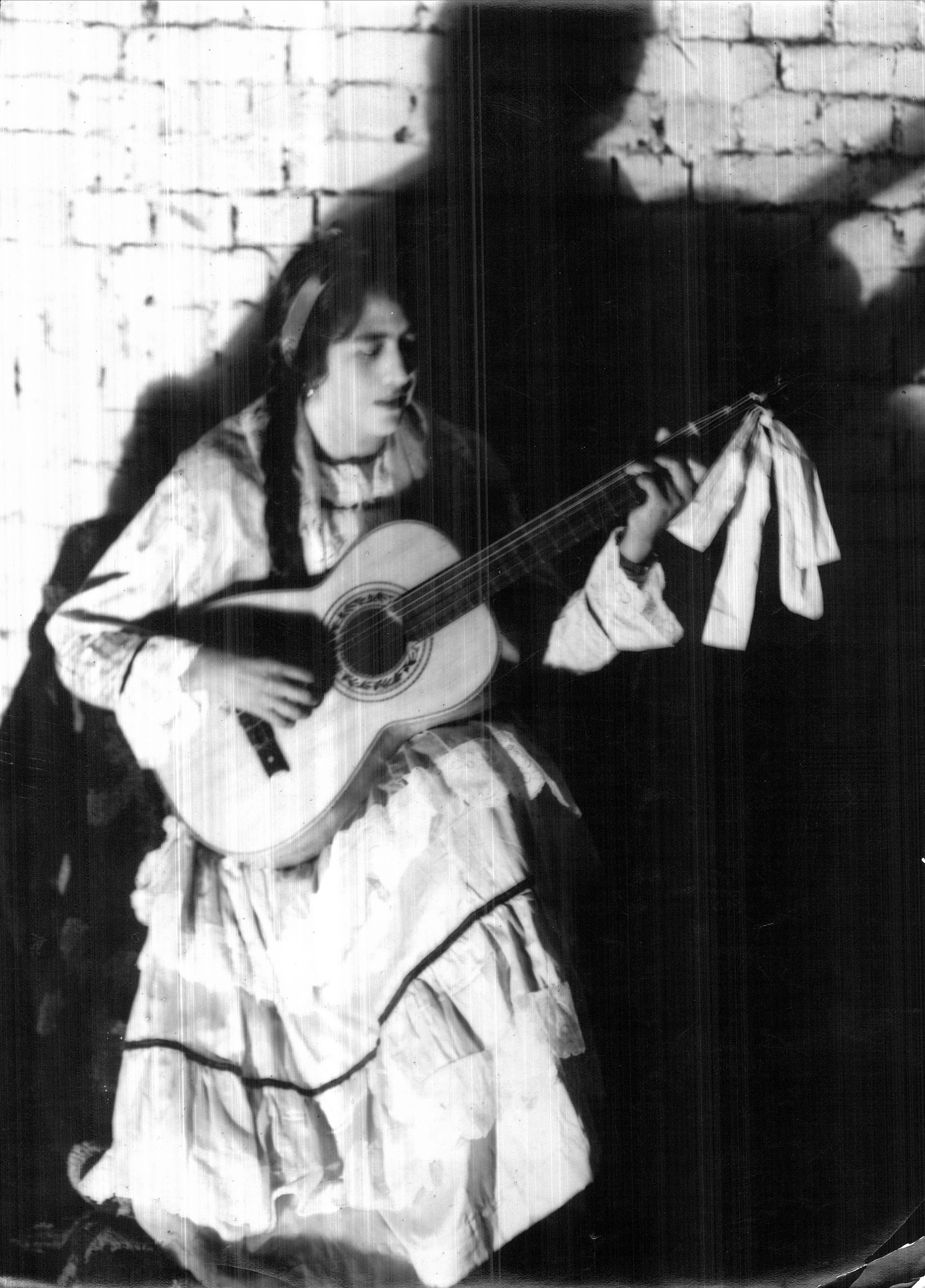
Diaz in the Chazarreta cast (1925)

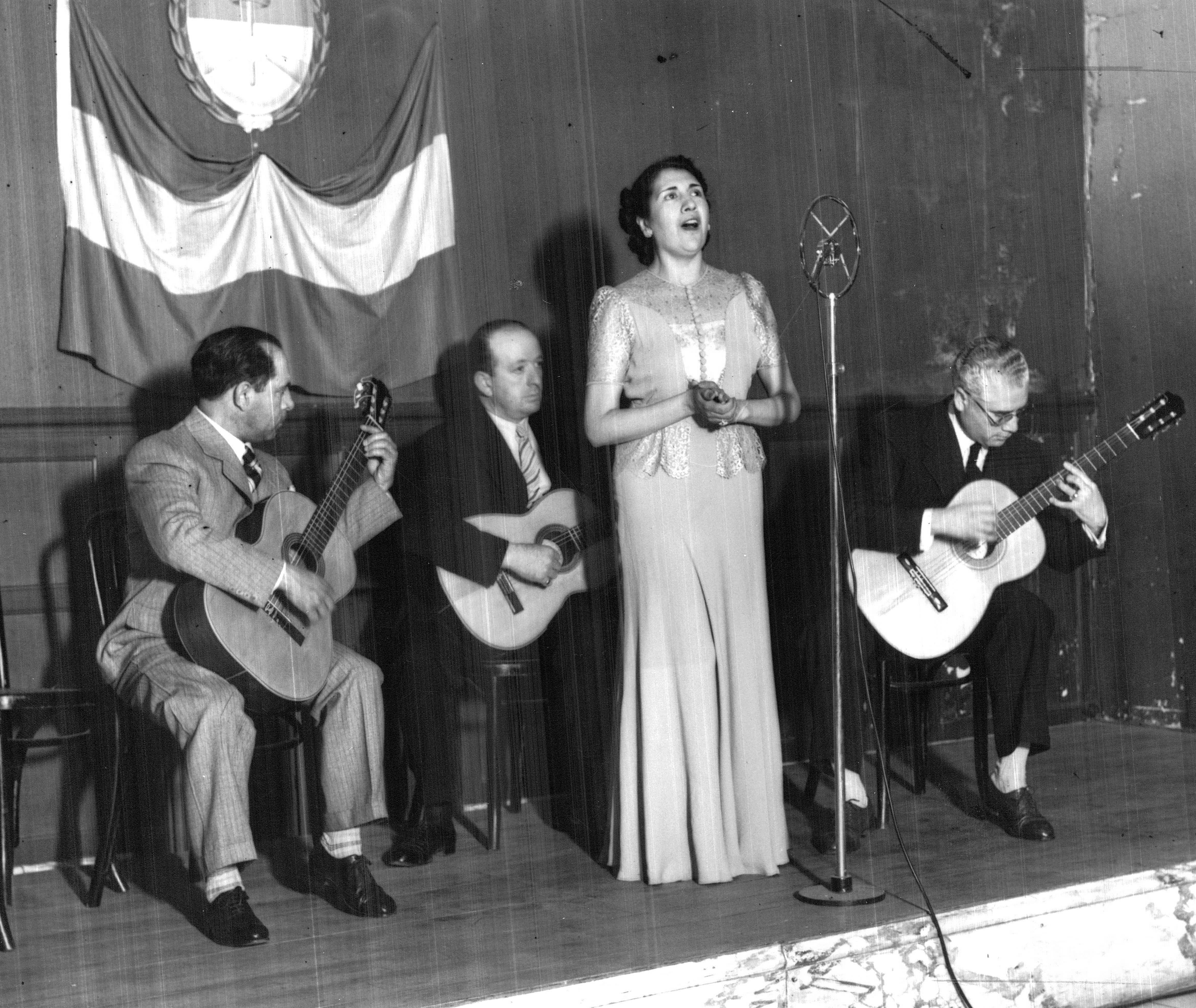
Diaz in 1939

Patrocinia Díaz, better known as Patrocinio Díaz (1905 – January 16, 1969) was an Argentine folk, lyrical, and tango singer and actress. She was one of the great exponents of Santiago del Estero folklore and tango sung by women.

== Early life and education ==
She was born at 212 Belgrano Street, an old mansion on the corner of Belgrano and Salta, in the capital of Santiago del Estero. Her parents were Rosario Valdéz and Domingo Díaz. Patrocinia had five sisters and a brother. She studied at the Colegio de Belén where a nun taught her liturgical songs, and then went to the Escuela Normal but did not finish her studies. When she got older, she studied music theory and piano with Manuel Gómez Carrillo, as well as guitar with Andrés Chazarreta.

== Career ==
She started singing opera, performing in amateur festivals directed by professionals. In that genre, she interpreted songs such as De Madrid a París, an operetta under the direction of José Óses, La Geisha with the collaboration of Paride Grandi, and Cavalleria rusticana where she played Lola.

Later, she turned to opera and then to folkloric song, in the company of Chazarreta. Together, they started in Buenos Aires after being represented by Joaquín de Vedia, so that Humberto Cairo hired them to debut at the Teatro Politeama, Buenos Aires, on March 18, 1921. In that year, they made 150 performances. Twenty years passed for such an event to happen again. Under that genre, Diaz sang songs like "La vidala del santiagueño" and "La López Pereyra". Diaz's folk music company was the first to perform at the Teatro Colón. Later, her company moved to the Solís Theatre in Montevideo, Uruguay.

After separating from Chazarreta, for three years, she distanced herself from the milieu. Together with her husband, she established a new company. The painter, Alfredo Guido collaborated. They selected dancers, singers and musicians from Santiago and, on the basis of a plan that included the different manifestations of northern songs, they made a complete show. The debut was also at the Teatro Politeama. Returning to Buenos Aires in 1927 to perform in the inaugural shows of the Paris cinema, she met Juan de Dios Filiberto, who brought her closer to the world of tango. With his orchestra, she recorded three tangos and a milonga: "El pañuelito", "Clavel del aire", "La canción" and "Porteñita", by Raúl Fernández Siro and José Cánepa. Shee also performed songs such as "Amor que muere". In 1930, she settled definitively in Buenos Aires.

In the cinema, she worked in the Juan Moreira (1936), directed by Nelo Cosimi, with Domingo Sapelli as the lead actor; it included the singers Alberto Gómez (cantor), Néstor Feria and Antonio Podestá.

== Filmography ==
- 1936: Juan Moreira
- 1931: Nobleza gaucha (1915 film) (sound version with Virginia Vera)

== Song performances ==
=== Lyrical ===
- De Madrid a París
- La Geisha
- Cavalleri Rusticana

=== Folklore, waltz, milonga, and zamba ===
- La vidala del santiagueño
- La López Pereyra
- Si tuviera un tucu tucu
- Amor que muere
- Linda Santiagueña
- Cuando llora la milonga

=== Tango and rancheras ===
- El pañuelito
- Clavel del aire
- La canción
- Porteñita
- Las margaritas
- Caminito
- Aquel nocturno
- El pañuelito
- Amor que muere
