= Juan Moreira (1936 film) =

- Directed by: Nelo Cosimi
- Written by: Eduardo Gutiérrez (novel); José González Castillo
- Starring: Antonio Podestá; Domingo Sapelli; Guillermo Casali; María Esther Podestá
- Cinematography: Antonio Prieto
- Music by: Cátulo Castillo
- Production companies: Art Film; Vaccari Alonso Film
- Release date: 17 September 1936
- Running time: 89 minutes
- Country: Argentina
- Language: Spanish

Juan Moreira is a 1936 Argentine historical action film directed by Nelo Cosimi and starring Antonio Podestá, Domingo Sapelli and Guillermo Casali. Released during the Golden Age of Argentine cinema, the film is an adaptation of the 1879 novel Juan Moreira by Eduardo Gutiérrez, portraying the life of the nineteenth century guacho and outlaw Juan Moreira.

== Cast ==
- Antonio Podestá
- Domingo Sapelli
- Guillermo Casali
- María Esther Podestá
- Adolfo Almeida
- Amalia Brian
- Juan Carula
- Raúl Castro
- Mario O. Catalán
- Max Citelli
- Patrocinio Díaz
- Néstor Feria
- Alberto Gómez
- Herminia Mancini
- Sarita Natle
- Antonio Podestá
- Samuel Sanda
- Yola Yoli

== Bibliography ==
- Goble, Alan. The Complete Index to Literary Sources in Film. Walter de Gruyter, 1999.
