= Juan Moreira =

Argentine outlaw & gaucho (1819–1874)

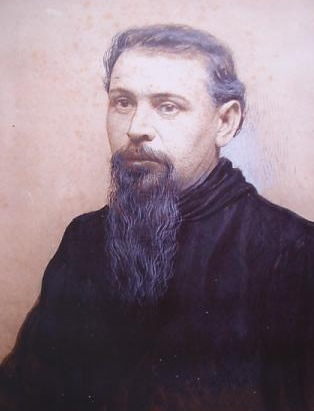
Juan Moreira

Juan Moreira (1819 - April 1874) was a well-known figure in the history of Argentina. An outlaw, gaucho and folk-hero, he is considered one of the most renowned Argentine rural bandits.

== Early life ==
Moreira was born in the administrative area of La Matanza, in the Province of Buenos Aires, Argentina. The first thirty years of his life were relatively uneventful, working in rural areas until he could buy his own ranch, some cattle, and land for farming. One characteristic that set him apart from others was that he rarely drank. Moreira devoted his free time to perfecting his skill on the guitar, which attracted the attention of Vicenta, the daughter of a local rancher. She fell in love with Moreira and eventually married him, with the full consent of her father.

Shortly after Moreira married Vicenta, his troubles began. The Deputy Mayor of the area, known as Don Francisco, had also fallen in love with La Vicenta, so as a form of vengeance he began charging Moreira fines for everything he could think of, real or imaginary. The first thing he did was charge Moreira 500 pesos for having his wedding celebration without proper authorization.

About that time, Moreira had lent Mr. Sardetti, a grocery-store owner, the sum of 10,000 pesos to buy merchandise. Fed up with asking for his money back, Moreira went to the Deputy Mayor, without any documentation, as was the custom at that time between men of their word, and reported what had happened in hopes that the Deputy Mayor would insist that Sardetti pay him back. It is unclear if Sardetti and Don Francisco were conspiring against Moreira, but Sardetti denied the story, and Moreira was thrown in jail for 48 hours for a form of attempted robbery.

== Point of no return ==
This situation made Moreira so angry that he swore that he would stab Sardetti for every single peso he had lost. Moreira fulfilled his oath when he killed Mr. Sardetti in a facon duel at Sardetti's grocery store. Returning home after a night of wandering, he found Don Francisco and four other soldiers waiting to arrest him. He resisted, and during the fight, Don Francisco and two soldiers were killed.

Extremely able in knifefights, Moreira won them all, even against more than one person. He gained such fame for this that men looked for him and picked fights with him to gain the glory of defeating him, but he never lost. He avoided fights whenever he could, and only killed after repeated provocation and in self-defense. Eventually, he served as a bodyguard for powerful politicians who promised to clean Moreira's reputation, but they never did so.

It is said that Moreira never took the saddle off his horse, just in case he had to make a quick escape. He spent much of this part of his life wandering through different towns and cities of the province of Buenos Aires, Argentina, including Navarro, Las Heras, Lobos, Veinticinco de Mayo and the lands of the Indian Cacique Coliqueo.

== Death ==
In April, 1874, Casimiro Villamayor, the justice of the peace in Lobos, was ordered by Mariano Acosta, governor of the Province of Buenos Aires, to send a posse led by Commander Bosch from the police department in Buenos Aires to arrest Moreira. They surrounded the grocery and saloon (pulpería) named La Estrella, where Moreira was holed up. Moreira fought like a wild animal against the police, and he was at the point of leaping over the wall which separated him from his horse when he was bayoneted in the left lung by one of the officers, Sergeant Chirino. Moreira managed to shoot at Chirino, who lost an eye, as well as to injure one other officer before he died. He was survived by his wife and a child, also named Juan. He was buried at the Lobos cemetery.

== Legacy ==
Juan Moreira is one of the most important figures in the popular history of Argentina. His life was laden with the violence and injustice which typified the unfair treatment received by the gauchos, treatment which led to his death. His skull and some personal belongings can be seen at Juan Domingo Perón Museum. His life inspired a very popular novel by romantic author Eduardo Gutiérrez, which in turn inspired at least four biographical films entitled Juan Moreira. The most important of these films, Juan Moreira was directed by Leonardo Favio in 1973, starring Rodolfo Bebán as the title character. The night of his death was fictionalized by Jorge Luis Borges in a short story, La noche de los dones.

== See also ==
- Juan Moreira (disambiguation)
