= Hiroaki Abe =

Imperial Japanese Navy admiral

- 阿部 弘毅
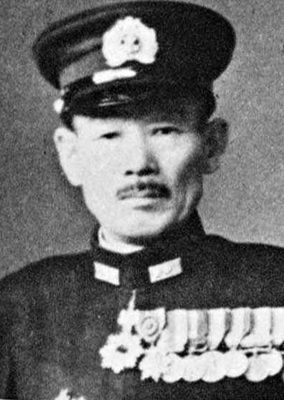
- Born: 15 March 1889; Yonezawa, Yamagata, Japan
- Died: 6 February 1949 (aged 59)
- Military career
- Allegiance: Empire of Japan
- Branch: Imperial Japanese Army
- Service years: 1911–1943
- Rank: Vice admiral
- Commands: Ushio, Hatsuyuki, Kaki, 1st Destroyer Division, 2nd Destroyer Division, 23rd Destroyer Division, Jintsū, Fusō, 14th Naval Air Group, 6th Destroyer Squadron, 8th Squadron, 11th Squadron
- Conflicts: World War II; Pacific War; Attack on Pearl Harbor; Battle of Wake Island; Battle of Midway; Battle of the Eastern Solomons; Battle of the Santa Cruz Islands; Naval Battle of Guadalcanal (WIA)

Hiroaki Abe (阿部 弘毅, Abe Hiroaki; 15 March 1889 – 6 February 1949) was an admiral in the Imperial Japanese Navy during World War II.

== Biography ==
=== Early career ===
Abe was born in Yonezawa city in Yamagata prefecture in northern Japan. He graduated from the 39th class of the Imperial Japanese Naval Academy in 1911, with a ranking of 26th out of a class of 148 cadets. As a midshipman, he served on the cruiser Soya and battleship Mikasa. After his promotion to ensign on 1 December 1912, he was assigned to the cruisers Nisshin and Chikuma, and the battleship Kongō.

After attending torpedo school and naval artillery school, he was promoted to sub-lieutenant and served on the destroyer Akebono, followed by the cruiser Chitose during World War I. However, it does not appear that Abe experienced combat during his tour of duty.

After the end of the war, he served in mostly staff positions until he was given his first command on 20 July 1922, the destroyer Ushio. He then commanded the destroyer Hatsuyuki, and was promoted to lieutenant commander the following year on 1 December 1923. He was captain of the destroyer Kaki for one year in 1925.

Abe returned to the Naval Staff College in 1926. He was promoted to commander on 10 December 1928, and captain on 1 December 1932. In 1936, he assumed command of the cruiser Jintsu, and a year later, that of the battleship Fusō.

=== Pacific War ===
On 15 November 1938, Abe was promoted to the rank of rear admiral. He was thus in command of Cruiser Division 8 (CruDiv8) during the attack on Pearl Harbor, and the subsequent Battle of Wake Island.

During the Guadalcanal campaign, as commander of Combat Division 11 (BatDiv 3 and CruDiv 8), he led his ships as the vanguard group at the Battle of the Eastern Solomons from 23–25 August 1942 and the Battle of the Santa Cruz Islands from 26–28 October. He was promoted to vice admiral on 1 November.

However, during the Naval Battle of Guadalcanal on 12–13 November, when assigned to bombard Henderson Field on Guadalcanal, he broke off his attack after encountering an almost completely crippling 40 minutes of intense combat with U.S. Navy Rear Admiral Daniel Callaghan's Task Group 67.4 (TG 67.4). Abe lost his flagship, the battleship Hiei, which he ordered scuttled after it had been seriously damaged, as well as two destroyers. Abe himself was wounded – and his chief of staff (Commander Masakane Suzuki) was killed – by machine-gun fire from the USS Laffey, a destroyer that he sank afterwards. But he still had the undamaged battleship Kirishima to bombard Henderson Field and enough destroyers to finish off damaged Allied vessels. His failure to aggressively push through his attack against an inferior enemy force created tremendous controversy, and he was relieved of his command by Admiral Isoroku Yamamoto.

Abe was forced to resign from the Imperial Japanese Navy soon afterward in March 1943. He died in 1949.

His younger brother, Toshio Abe (阿部 俊雄, Abe Toshio; 27 April 1896 – 29 November 1944), was also a career navy officer, and was captain of the aircraft carrier Shinano. Abe went down with Shinano, when she was torpedoed and sunk by the submarine USS Archerfish while performing trials.

== Notable positions held ==
- Crewmember, BB Kongō – 27 May 1914 – 1 December 1914
- Staff Officer, 3rd Fleet – 1 December 1919 – 10 November 1921
- Torpedo Officer, CL Tama – 10 May 1923 – 1 May 1924
- Senior Staff Officer, DesRon 2 – 30 November 1929 – 31 October 1931
- ComDesDiv 1 – 31 October 1931 – 16 May 1932
- ComDesDiv 2 – 15 November 1932 – 15 November 1933
- ComDesDiv 23 – 15 November 1933 – 15 November 1934
- Commanding Officer, CL Jintsu – 1 December 1936 – 1 December 1937
- Commanding Officer, BB Fusō – 1 December 1937 – 1 April 1938
- Commanding Officer, Air Group 14–1 April 1938 - 15 December 1938
- Chief Instructor of the Naval Academy - 15 December 1938 - 1 November 1940
- ComDesRon 6 – 15 November 1940 – 21 July 1941
- ComCruDiv 8 – 1 August 1941 – 14 July 1942
- ComBatDiv 11 – 14 July 1942 – 20 December 1942

== Dates of promotions ==
- Midshipman – 18 July 1911
- Ensign – 1 December 1912
- Sublieutenant – 1 December 1914
- Lieutenant – 1 December 1917
- Lieutenant Commander – 1 December 1923
- Commander – 10 December 1928
- Captain – 1 December 1932
- Rear Admiral – 15 November 1938
- Vice Admiral – 1 November 1942
