= Japanese destroyer Kaki =

Two ships of the Japanese Navy have been named Kaki:

- Japanese destroyer Kaki (1919), a Momi-class destroyer launched in 1919 and used as a training ship after being decommissioned in 1940. Renamed Ōsu in 1945 and scrapped in 1948.
- Japanese destroyer Kaki (1944), a Tachibana-class destroyer launched in 1944 and expended as a target in 1947
