= The Blue Squadron =

The Blue Squadron may refer to:

- The Blue Squadron (1934 film), an Anglo-Italian aviation drama film directed by George King
- The Blue Squadron (1937 film), an Argentine film directed and written by Nelo Cosimi
- Blue Squadron, a group of Spanish Air Force volunteers who fought for Germany during World War II
- Blue Squadron (Royal Navy), a division of the British Royal Navy 1596–1864
