= Juan Moreira (1973 film) =

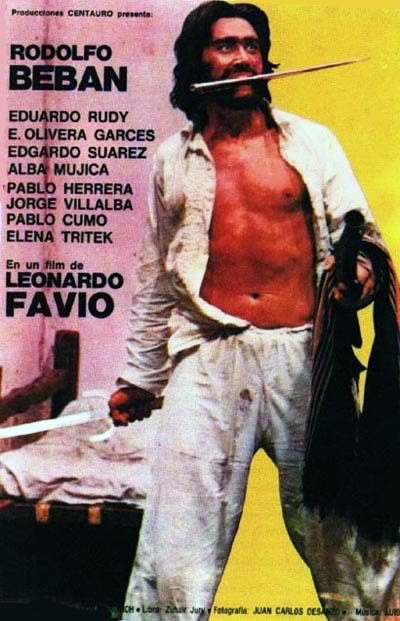
- Theatrical release poster
- Directed by: Leonardo Favio
- Screenplay by: Leonardo Favio; Jorge Zuhair Jury
- Based on: Juan Moreira by Eduardo Gutiérrez
- Produced by: Leonardo Favio; Tito Hurovich
- Starring: Rodolfo Bebán; Jorge Villalba; Pablo Cumo; Osvaldo De la Vega; Augusto Kretschmar; Alba Múgica
- Cinematography: Juan Carlos Desanzo
- Edited by: Antonio Ripoll
- Music by: Pocho Leyes; Luis María Serra
- Production company: Centauro Films
- Release date: 1973
- Running time: 102 minutes
- Country: Argentina
- Language: Spanish

Juan Moreira is a 1973 Argentine dramatic historical film directed by Leonardo Favio and starring Rodolfo Bebán. It is based on the homonymous novel by Eduardo Gutiérrez, which narrates the life of the famous Argentine outlaw, gaucho and folk hero Juan Moreira.

In a survey of the 100 greatest films of Argentine cinema carried out by the Museo del Cine Pablo Ducrós Hicken in 2000, the film reached the 9th position. In a new version of the survey organized in 2022 by the specialized magazines La vida útil, Taipei and La tierra quema, presented at the Mar del Plata International Film Festival, the film reached the 11th position.

== Cast ==
- Rodolfo Bebán ... Juan Moreira
- Jorge Villalba ... Julián Andrade
- Pablo Cumo ... Caudillo Acosta
- Osvaldo De la Vega
- Augusto Kretschmar ... Oficial
- Alba Mujica ... Death (The Grim Reaper)
- Carlos Muñoz ... Dr. Marañón
- Elcira Olivera Garcés ... La Vicenta
- Eduardo Rudy ... Lieutenant Major
- Edgardo Suárez ... El Cuerudo/Segundo, el compadre
- Elena Tritek ... Laura
