= Chita Foras =

Italian-Argentine actress

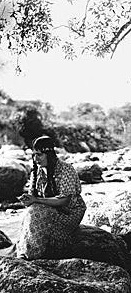
- 1929
- Born: Josefína Foras Cossini; 1900; Italy
- Died: 1986 (aged 85–86); Buenos Aires, Argentina
- Citizenship: Italy; Argentina
- Occupation: Actress
- Spouse: Nelo Cosimi

Chita Foras (1900–1986), was an Italian-Argentine actress noted for her work in silent and sound films.

== Biography ==
Born Josefína Foras Cossini, Chita Foras was an actress who appeared in numerous films during cinema's golden age. She worked in film and theater for more than three decades.

She married filmmaker Nelo Cosimi in March 1929. He directed her in several films, including a pair – Defiende tu honor (1930) and Dios y la patria (1931) – which were intended, in vain, to be released with disc-based sound systems.

She was part of the on-air staff of LRA Radio Nacional Buenos Aires who put on the radio play Las dos carátulas: El teatro de la humanidad in the 1980s, along with actors such as Adolfo Duncan, Claudia Durán, Adrián Di Stefano, Liliana Giménez, Miguel Ángel Medrano, Ricardo Lani, Haydeé Lesquer, Néstor Losadas, Norma Agüero, Rodolfo Caraballo, Enrique Conlazo, Noemí Deis, Osvaldo Demarco, and Inés Mariscal. She performed works such as Se necesita niñera by Mario Herbert Lago.

She died of natural causes in Buenos Aires in 1986.

== Theater ==
On stage, Foras appeared with stars such as Virginia Romay, Inés Murray, Mercedes Llambí, María Luisa Fernández, Lea Conti, Alicia Rojas, Chita Dufour, Elsa Angélica Fernández, Pascual Pellicciotta, Carlos Bianquet, Antonio Capuano, and Jorge Bergoechea.

She was part of "La Compañía Leonor Rinaldí", with a cast which also included Arturo Bamio and Alicia Rojas.

In the 1930s she had lead parts in several plays at the legendary theater "El Orfeón de Arturo Greco".

In April 1935 she was part of "La Compañía Argentina de Comedias Y Sainetes de Cordero-Sandrini" in the work Riachuelo, together with Luis Sandrini, Chela Cordero, María Ricard, Laila González, Roberto Ratti, and Máximo Moyano.

In 1947 she joined the "Compañía Española de Comedias de Teresa Silva y Antonio Martelo", debuting with a musical parody in the Teatro Cómico. She made an Echegaray drama titled ¡Ay!, which had a large cast, including Herminia Más, Nina Marcó Susana Sux, Lilia Bedrune, and Rodolfo Martincho.

She made the 1950 comedy El vivo vive del zonzo by Antonio Botta and Marcos Bronenmerg, with a cast including Conchi Sánchez, Olga Duncan, Chola Duby, Mabel Cabello, Pura Delgui, María T. Gutiérrez, Julio Bianquet, Arturo Bs mió, Ego Brunoldi, Leónidas Brandl, Andrés López, and Raúl Cúneo.

== Filmography ==
- 1923: Buenos Aires también tiene
- 1924: Valle negro
- 1925: Empleada se necesita
- 1926: El Lobo de la Ribera
- 1927: Federales y unitarios
- 1928: Regeneración
- 1928: La quena de la muerte
- 1928: La mujer y la bestia
- 1930: Defiende tu honor
- 1930: Corazón ante la ley
- 1931: Dios y la patria
- 1940: El cantor del circo
- 1954: Caídos en el infierno
