= Sarita Watle =

Argentinian dancer, singer and actress

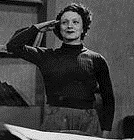
Sarita Watle (1937)

Sara Watle (better known as Sarita Watle) was a dancer, vedette, singer and actress of Argentine film, radio and theater. In 1937, she starred in her only film, El escuadrón azul. She was a protege of Battling Siki.
