= Nelo Cosimi =

Italian-born Argentine actor and film director

- Born: 1894; Macerata, Marche; Italy
- Died: 5 October 1945 (aged 50–51); Buenos Aires, Argentina
- Occupations: Actor, director, screenwriter
- Years active: 1917–1945 (film)
- Spouse: Chita Foras

Nelo Cosimi (1894 – 5 October 1945) was an Italian-born Argentine actor and film director. He directed thirteen films including the 1936 historical gaucho film Juan Moreira. He was married to the Italian-Argentine actress Chita Foras.

== Selected filmography ==
=== Actor ===
- Legend of the Inca Bridge (1923)
- Malambo (1942)
- Lauracha (1946)

=== Director ===
- Juan Moreira (1936)
- The Blue Squadron (1937)
