= Alice Golsen =

German physicist (1889-1940)

Alice Sophie Golsen
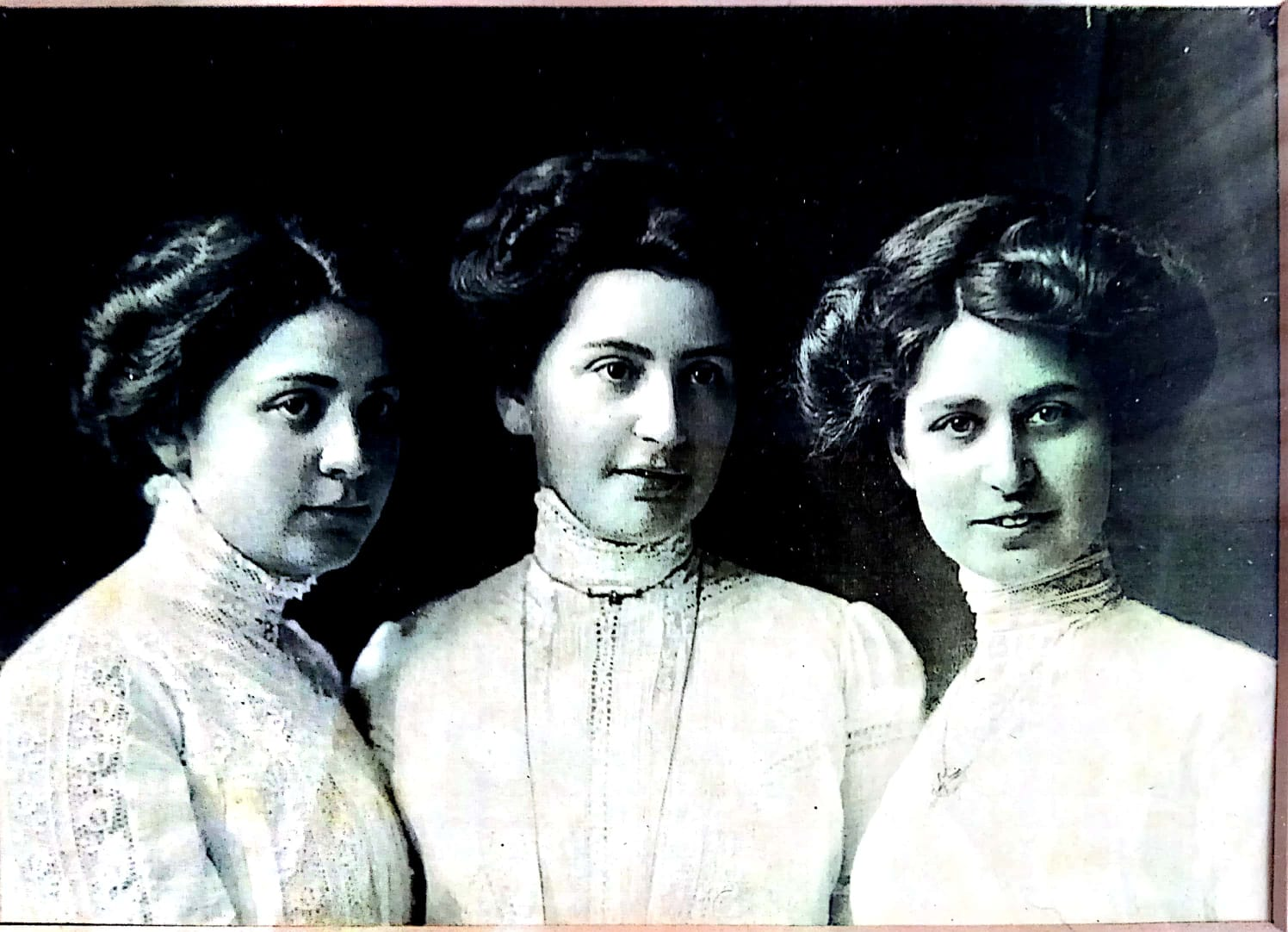
- Alice (far left) with her sisters Hedwig and Anni.
- Born: Alice Goldstein; September 22, 1889; Wiesbaden
- Died: June 14, 1940 (aged 50); Surrey
- Cause of death: Suicide
- Education: University of Berlin, University of Heidelberg, University of Frankfurt
- Scientific career
- Fields: Radiation pressure, quantum physics
- Thesis: Über eine neue Messung des Strahlungsdrucks (About a new measurement of radiation pressure) (1924)
- Doctoral advisors: Walter Gerlach, Richard Wachsmuth

Alice Sophie Golsen (born Goldstein; 22 September 1889 - 14 June 1940) was a physicist of a Jewish origin who worked in Germany between the two world wars. She obtained the first accurate measurements of light pressure, contributing to the development of modern quantum mechanics.

She features in the 2024-2025 "Light and Matter" special exhibition at the Deutsches Museum.

== Life ==
Alice was born in September 1889 in Wiesbaden into a non-practising Jewish family, the fourth of five children and the youngest of four sisters. Her father Carl and sister Jenny are both buried in the town's Jewish Cemetery. She attended the newly opened Lessing-Gymnasium Karlsruhe, the first high school for girls in Germany., and did well at school in Wiesbaden and Karlsruhe, especially in mathematics. In 1909 she began studying medicine at the University of Berlin. She struggled in her studies of anatomy and after a time moved to the University of Heidelberg to study mathematics and exact sciences, in which she had always been interested, graduating in 1915 and also completing a teaching certificate. She worked as part of the university's teaching staff until the end of the First World War. During this period she was baptised as a Protestant and changed her surname, probably to avoid discrimination due to her Jewish origins.

In 1920 she moved to the University of Frankfurt, where she completed her doctorate under Professors Richard Wachsmuth and Walter Gerlach. Her doctoral thesis dealt with the measurement of light pressure, discovered in 1900 by Pyotr Lebedev. This required great precision and so she conducted her measurements at night in order to avoid disturbances caused by passing trains during the day, teaching during the day. Her thesis was published as an article in Annalen der Physik.

She broke her ankle around 1920, leaving her lame for the rest of her life since the fracture never fully healed. After completing her doctoral thesis, Golsen remained in Frankfurt and seems to have continued to research, although no documents have been found to prove this, though there are records of her teaching at the city's Schillerschule from 1923 until the dismissal of all Jewish civil servants in December 1933. She and her four roommates in Frankfurt lived as economic partners and - after one of them inherited a large sum of money - they moved to the Frankfurt suburb of Neu-Isenburg and bought a car. Alice learned to drive and became the group's driver (a female driver at that time being as rare as several women living together).

As Nazi rule and anti-Semitic persecution in Germany worsened, she was dismissed from her job and decided to flee Germany for England. There she made her living as a maid for a family in Surrey. She committed suicide on the night of the 13-14 of June, a day after she received her internment orders. a woman from the Refugee Committee later wrote to Alice's sister in Israel that: "It was probably too much for her again to have to part from friends, whom she loved and, again at her age, to have to start a new life and get used to new conditions".
