= The Blue Squadron (1937 film) =

El escuadrón azul
- Screenshot composition
- Directed by: Nelo Cosimi
- Starring: Domingo Sapelli; María Esther Podestá; Sara Watle
- Distributed by: Società Anonima Films Attualità; Cinexport Distributing Co. (United States)
- Release date: 24 November 1937
- Country: Argentina
- Language: Spanish

The Blue Squadron (Spanish: El escuadrón azul) is a 1937 Argentine film directed and written by Nelo Cosimi during the Golden Age of Argentine cinema. The film was released in the United States on 3 June 1938 by the Cinexport Distributing Co.

== Cast ==
- Domingo Sapelli
- María Esther Podestá
- Sara Watle
- Samuel Sanda
- Adolfo Almeida
- Raúl Castro
- Amalia Brian
- Max Citelli
- Herminia Mancini
- Ángle Reyes
- Rafael Salvatore
- Alberto Terrones
- Yola Yoli
