= Juan Moreira (novel) =

Juan Moreira is an Argentine novel by Eduardo Gutiérrez. It was written during the winter of 1879 and is considered one of the most important works of Argentine literature. Shortly after its publication it was developed into a successful play, which is itself foundational in Buenos Aires's theatre. Three homonymous versions of the novel were made into a film: one in 1936, one in 1948, and the more famous, 1973 version, directed by Leonardo Favio.
