= Eduardo Gutiérrez =

Argentine writer (1851–1889)

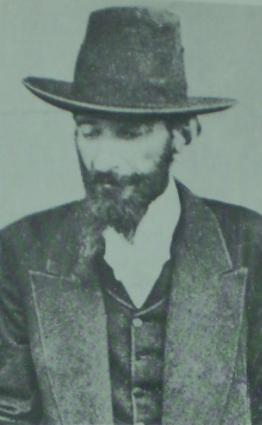
Eduardo Gutiérrez

Eduardo Gutiérrez (15 July 1851 – 2 August 1889) was an Argentine writer. His works of gauchoesque nature acquired great popularity, specially Juan Moreira, a novel successfully adapted to the stage in 1884 that popularized the gaucho as a protagonist in Argentine theatre.
