= Golden Age of Argentine cinema =

Period in Argentine cinema history

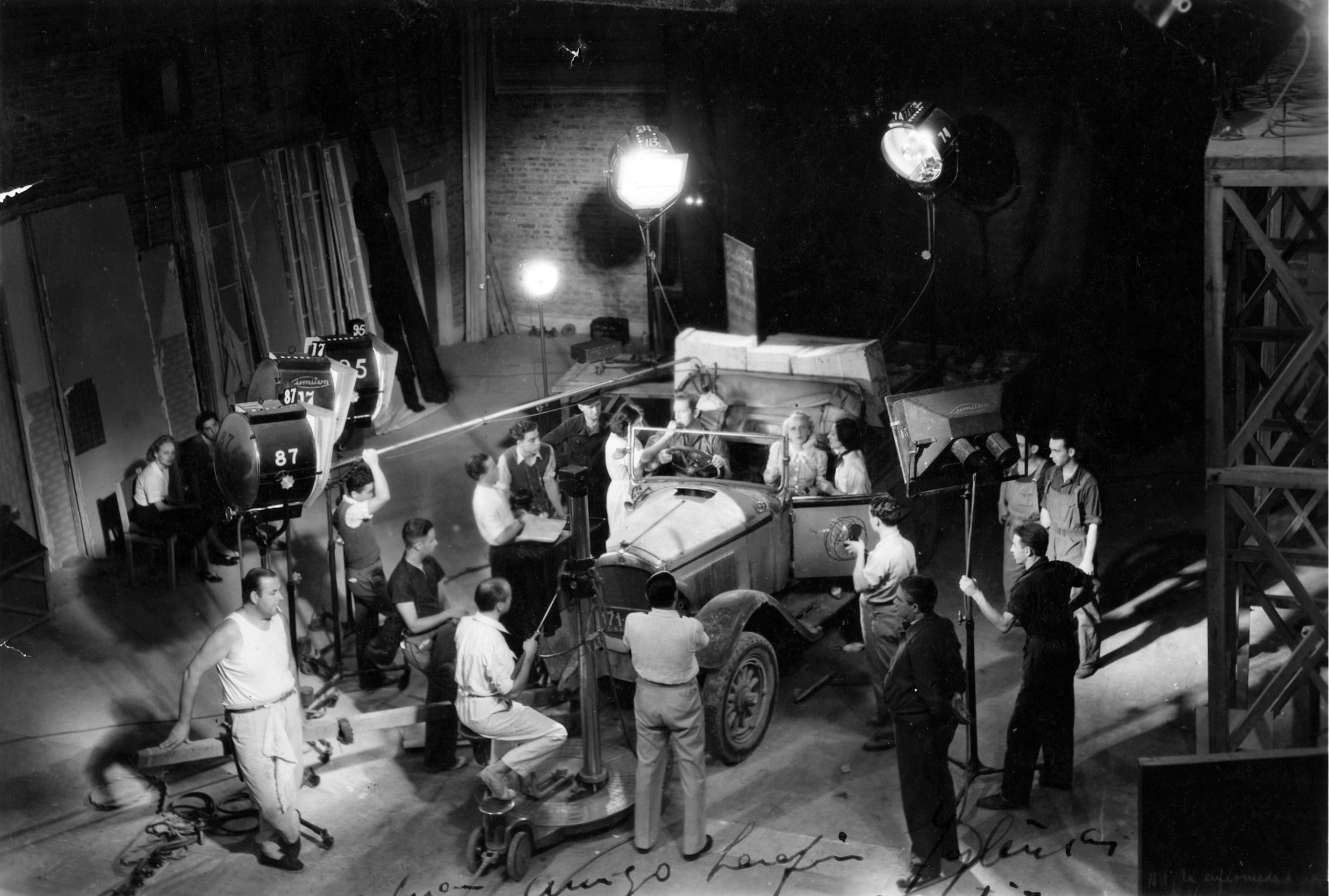
- View of the shooting of Manuel Romero's La rubia del camino (1938) at Lumiton studios.
- Years active: 1930s–1940s or 1950s (Note: It is generally agreed that the advent of the sound era in 1933 constituted the opening to industrialization in Argentine cinema. Film historian Domingo Di Núbila—who introduced the concept of the Golden Age— places the period between 1933 and 1942, the years of release of the films ¡Tango! and La guerra gaucha respectively. Writers that equate the Golden Age to the so-called "classical" or "classical-industrial" period, like Claudio España and his collaborators, date its end in 1956, with the crisis and decline of the studio system. According to Fernando Martín Peña, the Argentine film industry was consolidated as such around 1938 and ceased to exist around 1948, although he also wrote that the Golden Age ended definitively in 1956 with the crisis triggered by the new dictatorship. Other authors, like Peter H. Rist and Jorge Finkielman, narrow the Golden Age between 1937 and 1942, the years of greatest production and international dominance.)
- Location: Argentina
- Major figures: Mario Soffici; Manuel Romero; Luis Saslavsky; Carlos Schlieper; Lucas Demare; Carlos Hugo Christensen; Leopoldo Torres Ríos; Hugo del Carril; Luis César Amadori; Daniel Tinayre; José A. Ferreyra; Luis Moglia Barth; Román Viñoly Barreto; Alberto de Zavalía; Luis Bayón Herrera
- Influences: Argentine silent cinema; tango; classical Hollywood cinema; radio dramas; Argentine popular theatre; sainete; revista porteña; zarzuela; Carlos Gardel's films; Argentine literature; French cinema; world literature

The Golden Age of Argentine cinema (Spanish: Época de Oro del cine argentino or other equivalent names), (Note: In addition to Época de Oro, the Golden Age has also been referred to in Spanish as the equivalent Edad de Oro, Era de Oro, época dorada, edad dorada, período dorado, período de oro, or era dorada.) sometimes known interchangeably as the broader classical or classical-industrial period (Spanish: período clásico-industrial), is an era in the history of the cinema of Argentina that began in the 1930s and lasted until the 1940s or 1950s, depending on the definition, during which national film production underwent a process of industrialization and standardization that involved the emergence of mass production, the establishment of the studio, genre and star systems, and the adoption of the institutional mode of representation (MRI) that was mainly—though not exclusively—spread by Hollywood, quickly becoming one of the most popular film industries across Latin America and the Spanish-speaking world.

Argentine industrial cinema arose in 1933 with the creation of its first and most prominent film studios, Argentina Sono Film and Lumiton, which released ¡Tango! (1933) and Los tres berretines (1933), respectively, two foundational films that ushered in the sound-on-film era. Although they were not national productions, the 1931–1935 films made by Paramount Pictures with tango star Carlos Gardel were a decisive influence on the emergence and popularization of Argentine cinema. The nascent film industry grew steadily, accompanied by the appearance of other studios such as SIDE, Estudios Río de la Plata, EFA, Pampa Film and Estudios San Miguel, among others, which developed a continuous production and distribution chain. The number of films shot in the country grew 25-fold between 1932 and 1939, more than any other Spanish-speaking country. By 1939, Argentina established itself as the world's leading producer of films in Spanish, a position that it maintained until 1942, the year in which film production reached its peak for the decade.

In classical Argentine cinema, film genres were almost always configured as hybrids, with melodrama emerging as the reigning mode of the period. Its early audience were the urban working classes, so its content was strongly rooted in their culture, most notably tango music and dance, radio dramas, and popular theatrical genres like sainete or the revista porteña (local revue). These forms of popular culture became the main roots of the film industry, from which many of its main performers, directors and screenwriters came. Much of the themes that defined the Argentine sound cinema in its beginnings were inherited from the silent period, including the opposition between the countryside and the city, and the interest in representing the world of tango. As the industry's prosperity increased in the late 1930s, bourgeois characters shifted from villains to protagonists, in an attempt to appeal to the middle classes and their aspirations. Starting in the mid-1940s, Argentine cinema adopted an "internationalist" style that minimized national references, including the disuse of local dialect and a greater interest in adapting works of world literature.

Beginning in 1943, as a response to Argentina's neutrality in the context of World War II, the United States imposed a boycott on sales of film stock to the country, causing Mexican cinema to displace Argentina as the market leader in Spanish. During the presidency of Juan Perón (1946–1955), protectionist measures were adopted, which managed to revitalize Argentine film production. However, financial fragility of the industry led to its paralysis once Perón was overthrown in 1955 and his stimulus measures ended. With the studio system entering its definitive crisis, the classical era came to an end as new criteria for funding and shooting films emerged, including the irruption of modernism and auteur films, and a greater prominence of independent cinema. The creation of the National Film Institute in 1957 and the innovative work of figures such as Leopoldo Torre Nilsson gave rise to a new wave of filmmakers in the 1960s, who opposed "commercial" cinema and experimented with new cinematic techniques.

== History ==
=== Background (1896–1933) ===
==== 1896–1929: The Argentine silent era ====
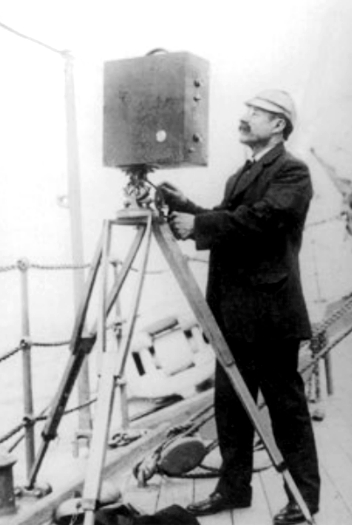
French immigrant Eugenio Py is generally considered to have made the first films of the country in the 1890s.

Thomas Edison's first kinetoscopes arrived in Buenos Aires in 1894, but public film projection onto a screen became possible only with the Lumière brothers' cinematograph, with which a series of presentations were made on 18 July 1896 at the Teatro Odeón. In 1897, the first projectors and cameras—from the Lumière and Gaumont firms—reached the country through Enrique Lepage's photography store, Casa Lepage. Their technician, the French Eugenio Py, became the first person to systematically film in Argentina; he shot the short La bandera argentina (1897), a register of the national flag which is generally considered the country's first film. Other authors believe that the first films were made by the German filmmaker Federico Fignero, who shot different views with a vitascope in 1896, with camera operator José Steimberg. In addition to Lepage and Py, the third figure who dominated film production at this time was the Austrian Max Glücksmann, who was initially an employee of Casa Lepage and later acquired the firm in 1908. The works of these early years of Argentine cinema correspond to actuality films. As noted by historian José Agustín Mahieu, this stage of national cinema "naively discovers the magic of movement, the direct capture of the landscape, of the event. The camera is still a primary eye planted in front of the facts. Over any other concern (artistic or cultural) prevails the technical curiosity, the exploration of a tool that is just beginning to be known." Thus, a small-scale commercial exploitation began, with the Casa Lepage offering projectors and films to restaurants, cafes or other entertainment venues. The company dominated the country's film production for a decade, dedicated to filming curiosities and current events such as official state visits, festivities and tourist sights. In 1900, the first movie theater, the Salón Nacional, was inaugurated, and soon more venues dedicated to the projection of films were opened.

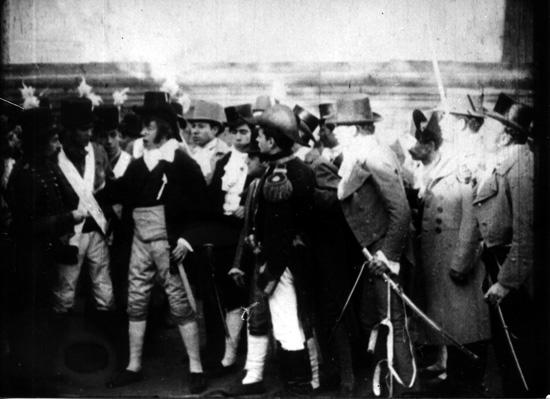
A frame from Mario Gallo's La Revolución de Mayo (1909), regarded as the first narrative film of the country.

At the end of the 1900s, Argentine cinema made significant progress with the appearance of the first narrative films, which stimulated production and distribution. Mario Gallo, an Italian who had arrived in Buenos Aires a few years before as part of an opera company, started producing narrative films. There is confusion as to which was the first narrative film in the country: those who date its release in 1908 consider it to be El fusilamiento de Dorrego, while more recent researchers point out that this film is actually from 1910 and the first one was really La Revolución de Mayo, released in 1909. For this reason, May 23 is considered National Film Day in the country, in commemoration of the release date of the latter film. In the manner of the French film d'art trend, Gallo's films were closer to photographed theatre, almost always on historical topics. In 1914, Glücksmann produced the oldest surviving feature film, Amalia, very similar in style to Gallo's films. The film was an initiative of the Buenos Aires aristocracy, and premiered at the prestigious Teatro Colón with the attendance of President Victorino de la Plaza. European film production declined due to the outbreak of World War I in 1914, which resulted in an abundance of Argentine production in the following years.

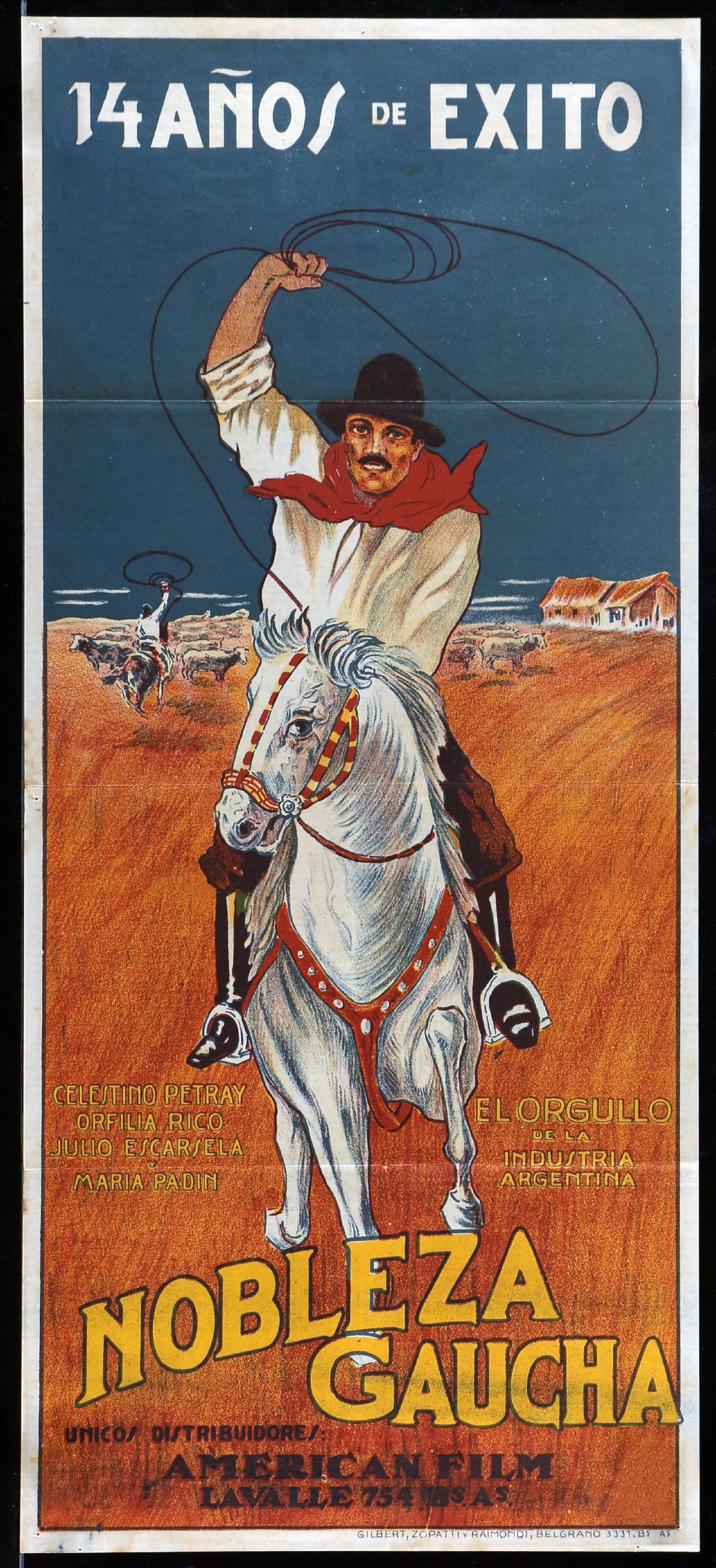
The unprecedented commercial success of Nobleza gaucha (1915) inaugurated a new boom period for Argentine silent cinema.

Before the arrival of sound films, Argentina experienced a "golden age" of silent films and led their production in Spanish, with more than 100 feature films being made between 1915 and 1924, equal to the combined total of those made in Mexico and Spain. During the first three decades of the 20th century, more than 200 feature films were produced in the country, in addition to a large number of documentaries, newsreels and shorter fictional works. The release of the 1915 film Nobleza gaucha was a turning point in Argentine film history, opening new artistic and economic paths. Nicknamed "the goldmine" by distributors and exhibitors, Nobleza gaucha was an unexpected massive commercial success which remained in theaters for more than two decades, and was also released in Spain and several Latin American countries. The artistic and commercial possibilities that the success of this film signaled translated into a growth of film activity in the country, with new producers and directors following its path; however, none were able to reach the initial success of Nobleza gaucha. Another notable production of the era was Juan Sin Ropa (1919), produced by a partnership between the prestigious actors Camila and Héctor Quiroga and the French filmmakers Paul Capellani and Georges Benoît. This period is also significant for the emergence of the country's first women filmmakers, the production of numerous newsreels and documentaries, and the first animated feature films in cinema history by Quirino Cristiani. Reflecting on the Argentine silent era, Fernando Martín Peña wrote:

If anything characterizes Argentine silent cinema, even during its most prolific period, it is its dispersion and diversity. Instead of being concentrated in large companies, production appears atomized in dozens of independent enterprises, technically assisted by a relatively small number of specialists and laboratories (or "talleres" [workshops], in the terms of the time). This phenomenon explains its wide thematic variety and its singularities: in this mode of production, opposed by definition to the mass production favored by the big studios, the exception was the rule.

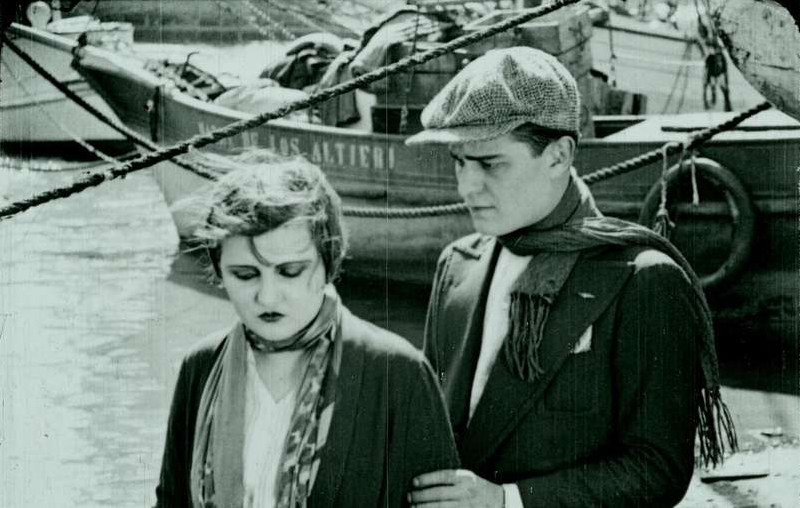
María Turgenova and Ermete Meliante in Perdón, viejita (1927), one of the many tango-based films by José A. Ferreyra, of great influence for later cinema.

In the early 1920s, Argentine silent cinema entered a crisis caused by the recovery of European industry after the end of the war and the ascent of Hollywood cinema to a position of unparalleled international dominance. The 1920s was marked by the activity of four main directors: José A. Ferreyra, Nelo Cosimi, Edmo Cominetti and Julio Irigoyen. In this decade, the first model of tango-based films was systematized, despite the absence of sound, with titles including Milonguita (José Bustamante y Ballivián, 1922), La cieguita de la avenida Alvear (Julio Irigoyen, 1924), La borrachera del tango (Edmo Cominetti, 1928) and La vendedora de Harrods (Francisco Defilippis Novoa, 1921). These silent films laid the groundwork for the tango melodramas that defined the Argentine cinema of the early classical period in the following decade.

The most complete form of the silent "tango melodrama" model was the work of José A. Ferreyra, who began his career in the mid-1910s and stands out as the most important Argentine filmmaker of the 1920s, and would continue to be a central figure during the transition to sound and later in the classical-industrial period. Considered a precursor of neorealism, Ferreyra's influential style was characterized by its profoundly local identity, with characters and situations linked to the world of tango lyrics and the urban working classes of Buenos Aires, in whose streets he filmed with low resources and often starring non-actors. Many of Ferreyra's titles point to a connection with the mythology of the city and its music: La muchacha del arrabal (1922), Buenos Aires, ciudad de ensueño (1922), Mi último tango (1925), El organito de la tarde (1925), Muchachita de Chiclana (1926), La vuelta al bulín (1926) and Perdón, viejita (1927), among others. Some of these films were based on specific tangos while others inspired the composition of new tangos, and also incorporated other elements of popular culture such as sainete and serial novels. Historian Jorge Miguel Couselo noted Ferreyra's total identification with tango and his adherence to Buenos Aires, particularly its working-class neighborhoods.

==== 1929–1933: Transition to sound films ====
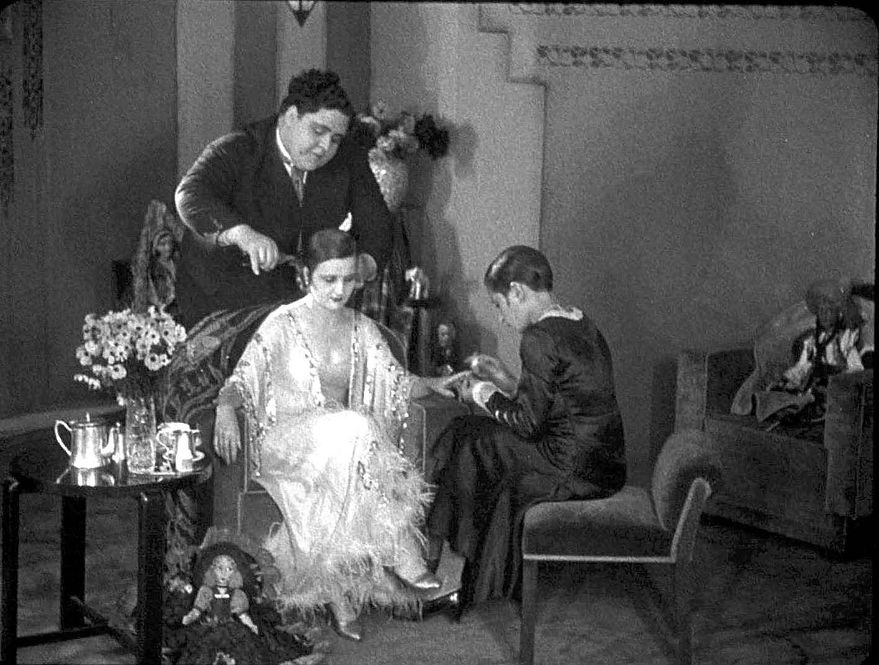
María Turgenova in José A. Ferreyra's Muñequitas porteñas (1931), one of the first sound films in the country, which used the sound-on-disc technique.

Around 1929, the inventor Alfredo Murúa—founder of Sociedad Impresora de Discos Electrofónicos (SIDE)—became a partner of the Ariel production company, and produced the short film Mosaico criollo (1929), with his own sound-on-disc system. Mosaico criollo, the first instalment of an intended series, does not have any spoken dialogue and is instead a filmed "musical revue". Murúa was responsible for the sound of most of the Argentine sound films made between 1931 and 1933, always using the sound-on-disc technique. The most important was Muñequitas porteñas (1931) by Ferreyra, for its pioneering use of spoken dialogue, although there were several others that used it partially, such as Amanecer de una raza (1931) by Cominetti, El cantar de mi ciudad (1930) by Ferreyra or La vía de oro (1931) by Cominetti; or that used sound to record only music and sound effects, among them ¡Adiós Argentina! (1930) by Mario Parpagnoli, La canción del gaucho (1930) by Ferreyra or Dios y la patria (1931) by Cosimi. Films that were originally silent were re-released with new sound added, as in the case of Nobleza gaucha and Perdón, viejita, among others. Fernando Martín Peña noted that Argentina's transition from silent to sound films was similar to the United States and Europe.

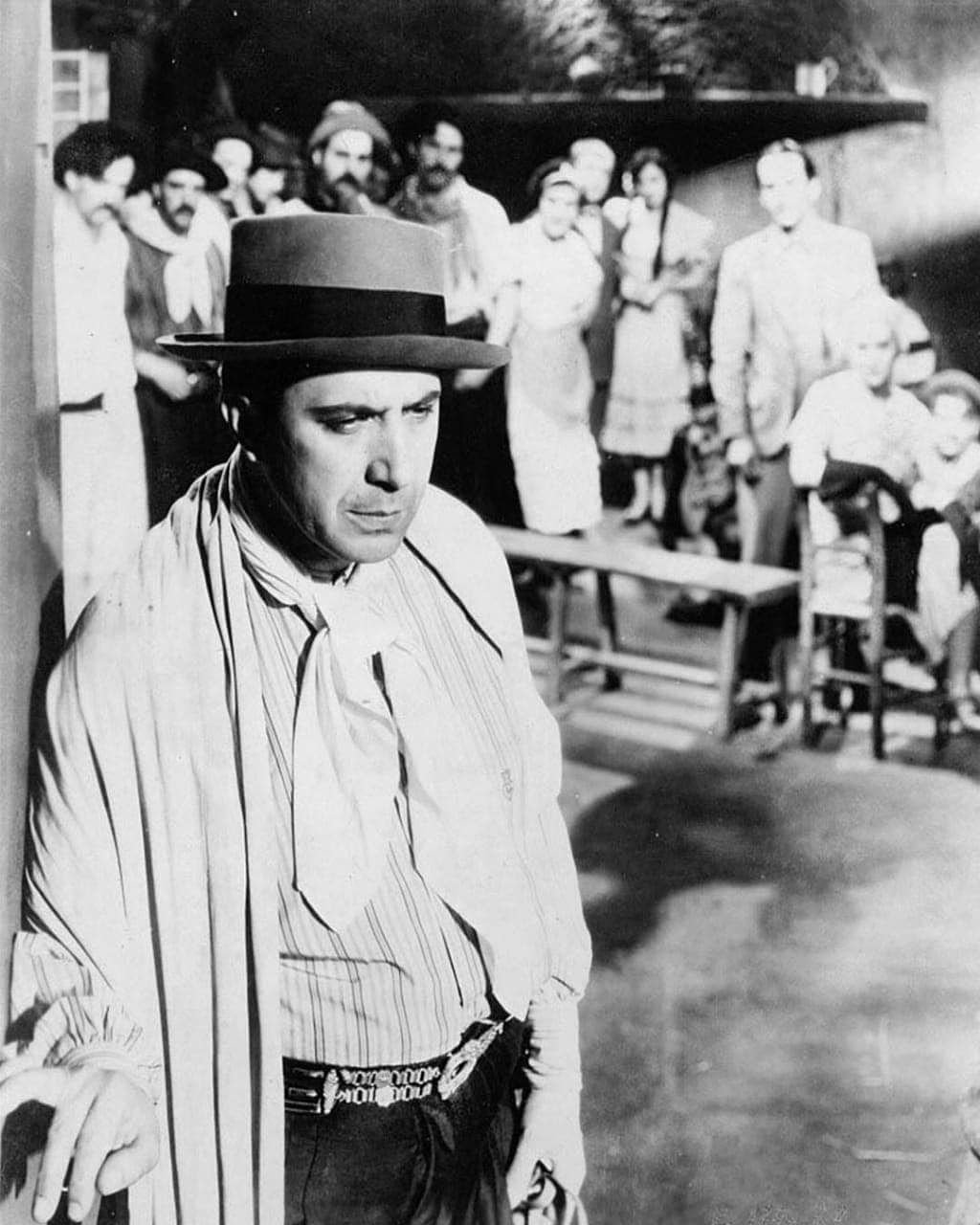
Carlos Gardel in Luces de Buenos Aires (1931), the first in a series of films produced by Paramount Pictures featuring the tango star that were decisively influential on the incipient local producers.

The arrival of sound films reduced the international dominance of American cinema due to the language barrier. This situation was analogous to the one that occurred during World War I, when the European film crisis benefited Argentine producers. Hollywood tried to deal with these difficulties with attempts at dubbing that ended up failing and also with various forms of subtitling, although this still required technical development and also excluded illiterate audiences. Eventually, the U.S. industry reacted by making little accepted Spanish-language versions of its most important productions, although they found the greatest success once they began to produce original Spanish-language films made to showcase Latin American stars. Among them, the 1931–1935 films made by Paramount Pictures starring Carlos Gardel stood out, and became a major influence on the emergence of an Argentine film industry. Before being hired by Paramount, Gardel—the most popular performer in the history of tango—had starred in a series of short films using optical sound between 1930 and 1931, which were directed by Eduardo Morera and produced by Federico Valle. The first of Gardel's feature films produced by Paramount was Luces de Buenos Aires, released in September 1931 to great success. By this time optical sound had demonstrated its advantage over disc systems, so the equipment was progressively replaced in a process that lasted throughout 1932.

Despite being foreign productions, Gardel's films may be considered part of the history of Argentine cinema, as they were conceived by the singer himself together with other Argentine artists (like his lyricist Alfredo Le Pera or revue producer Manuel Romero), and their model corresponded to that of the tango dramas directed by Ferreyra during the silent era, resulting in a strong Argentine identity. In addition, their commercial success demonstrated the viability of Argentine cinema for the incipient local producers that would inaugurate the Golden Age period in 1933. Paradoxically, Hollywood's attempt to dominate the local market resulted in the birth of the national industry, which took Gardel's films as a model to be replicated. According to Peña, the success of Gardel's films was "in fact the success of Ferreyra's and Torres Ríos' ideas taken up by a popular idol and legitimized for the local culture because of their 'foreign' condition". In an interview, Argentine film historian Clara Kriger felt that: "... we [Argentine film historians] always say 'in 1933 the industry was born in Argentina', and the truth is that I would say that until Gardel appeared in films, Argentine cinema practically did not exist on billboards; very little Argentine cinema was being seen." The last four Paramount productions with Gardel were his own productions that the studio agreed to finance, with full property rights for both creators after a first period of commercial exploitation.

=== Development (1933–1956) ===
==== 1933–1936: Birth and growth of the industry ====
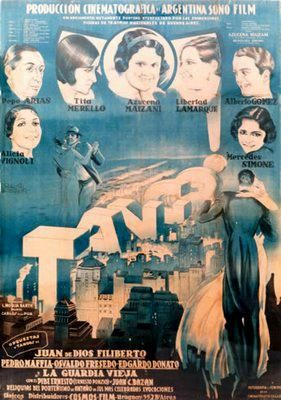
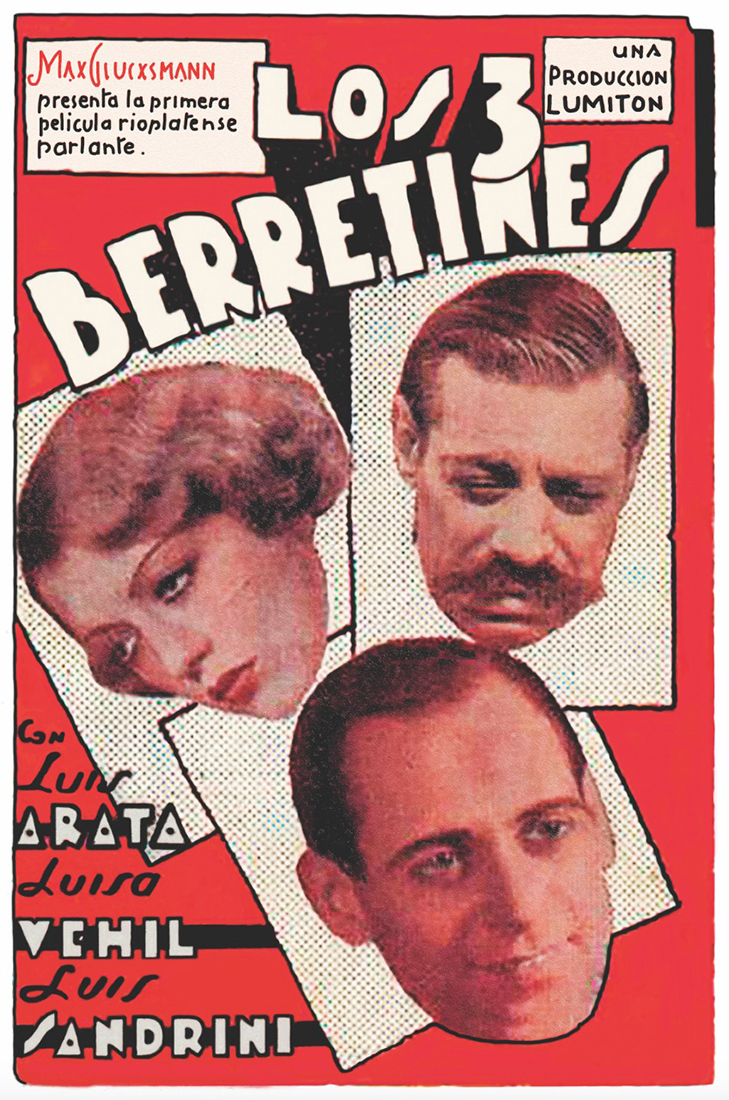
The Argentine film industry took off in 1933 with the release of the first national optical sound films: ¡Tango! (left) and Los tres berretines (right), produced by Argentina Sono Film and Lumiton, respectively.

The year 1933 meant the beginning of an industrial organization in Argentine cinema due to the emergence of Argentina Sono Film and Lumiton (the first two optical sound film studios in Latin America) and the almost simultaneous release of their first productions ¡Tango! (1933) and Los tres berretines (1933), respectively, the first feature films with optical sound in Argentine cinema. Inspired by the Hollywood model, Argentina Sono Film founder Ángel Mentasti introduced serial industrial production to local filmmaking, and his plan consisted of "[forming] a company on the basis of three films and not release the first until the second had started and the third was announced." The project started after Luis Moglia Barth contacted Mentasti with the idea of producing a film entirely starring the popular performers of revue theater, tango and radio. The duo secured financing for Argentina Sono Film and conducted serial production to give them a better chance of negotiating with distributors. The musical ¡Tango! premiered on 27 April 1933 and attracted audiences for its select cast of popular performers, including Luis Sandrini, Azucena Maizani, Mercedes Simone, Libertad Lamarque, Pepe Arias and Tita Merello, among others. While ¡Tango! was being released, Argentina Sono Film was shooting its second film, Dancing (1933), which performed poorly at the box office, while the great success of the third film, Riachuelo (1934), ensured the economic viability of the studio.

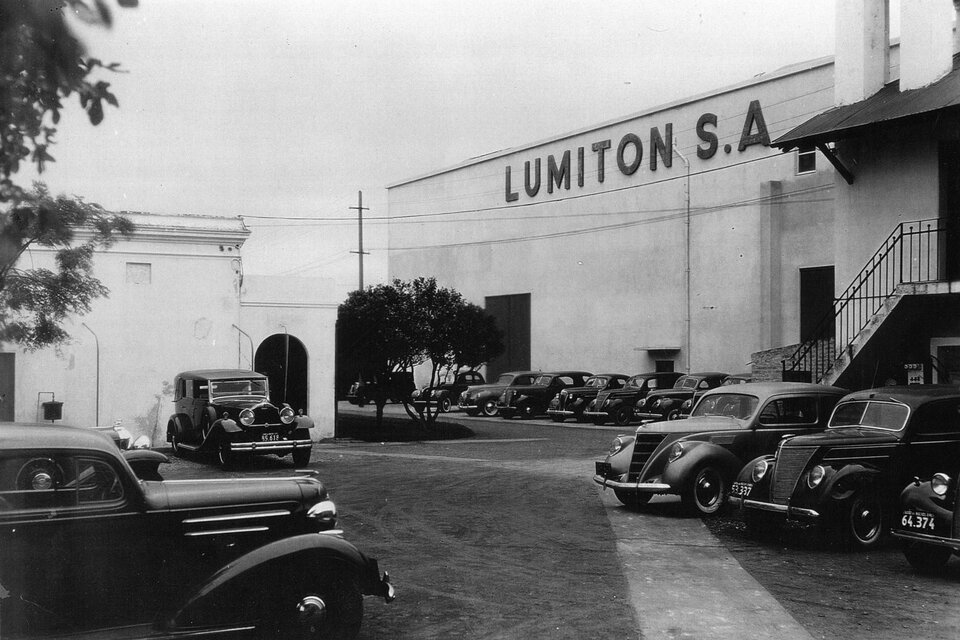
View of Lumiton in Munro, Greater Buenos Aires, c. 1930s.

Lumiton was founded by César José Guerrico, Enrique Telémaco Susini, Miguel Mugica and Luis Romero Carranza; they were a group of well-off entrepreneurs who introduced radio to the country in 1920. The group had traveled to Hollywood in 1931, where they studied the novelty of optical sound films and decided to bring the new technology to Argentina. After purchasing complete film equipment at Bell & Howell in Chicago, they returned to Buenos Aires and began building a studio in Munro, Buenos Aires Province, replicating the sound stages they had seen in Hollywood. Thanks to the financial backing of its founding partners, Lumiton became a pioneer in the industrial and autonomous conceptualization of production. The company brought in experienced technicians (including cinematographer John Alton) and opened its first film gallery in December 1932, beginning production with an adaptation of the successful play Los tres berretines, which was released on 19 May 1933. Although ¡Tango! is often considered the first success of classical Argentine cinema, research on the box-office records of the time indicates that Los tres berretines had an even greater impact on audiences. In both films, Sandrini plays an awkward, stuttering comic archetype that he had previously consecrated in the theatrical version of Los tres berretines. With some variations, Sandrini played this character in the rest of his films of the decade, which established him as a star of humorous cinema in the Spanish-speaking world during the 1930s and early 1940s.

Several new production companies formed after the success of ¡Tango! and Los tres berretines. The number of released films grew from 6 films in 1933 to 14 in 1935, half of which were directorial debuts. Among them were Manuel Romero, Mario Soffici, Daniel Tinayre, Luis Saslavsky and Alberto de Zavalía. Río de la Plata was founded by musician Francisco Canaro in 1934, and had a studio in Buenos Aires. Its first production was Ídolos de la radio (1934), which sought to attract audiences with a star-studded cast of radio personalities, including singers (including the only film performance of tango star Ada Falcon), comedians, orchestras and announcers. Daniel Tinayre's debut film Bajo la Santa Federación (1935) was produced by Productora Argentina de Filmes (PAF). Luis Saslavsky and Alberto de Zavalía presented in 1935 their first films, Crimen a las tres and Escala en la ciudad, respectively, which were produced with family money disguised under the name of the Sifal production company. Manuel Romero joined Lumiton after the commercial failure of the company's second film Ayer y hoy (1934) and brought it a new box-office success with Noches de Buenos Aires (1935). Romero would become one of the most prolific directors of classical Argentine cinema, known for the speed with which he shot and released his films, most of them with Lumiton.

In addition to new production companies, the demand for Argentine films prompted the emergence of independent productions, that is, those that were made outside the studios. However, Peña notes that the term "independent" for these films is actually a misnomer, as "in the early years of sound, Argentina Sono Film itself was not really a 'big studio' and could have disappeared like many other production companies of those years"; because all the production companies other than Lumiton lacked the financial resources to weather commercial failures, Peña says, "the mode of production remained, as in the silent period, atomized, adventurous, fragile." Alton temporarily stepped away from Lumiton to make his own film, El hijo de papá (1933) starring Sandrini, which was such a failure that it caused the latter to set the film's negatives on fire. Moglia Barth also decided to try independent production, moving away from Mentasti to make Picaflor (1935), although the following year he returned to Argentina Sono Film. Also in 1933, the film El linyera directed by Enrique Larreta was released, which is considered more of a filmed theatrical piece than a cinematographic work. The director who had the greatest success in independent filmmaking was Ferreyra, with three films released between 1934 and 1935: Calles de Buenos Aires, Puente Alsina and Mañana es domingo, all of them made with "very few resources but recovering the poetics of his best silent period."

Argentina's film industry grew in the 1930s despite American studios having advantages against Argentinians, including greater capital, scale, and distribution leverage. The Argentine film studios were very small compared to powerful companies such as Paramount, Metro-Goldwyn-Mayer, Warner Bros., Twentieth Century-Fox, Columbia, Universal and United Artists, all of which had offices in Buenos Aires and other cities in the country by 1935. Lacking the bargaining strength of foreign companies, Argentine producers could not secure a distribution system guaranteeing a share of gross receipts, thus resorting to flat fee sales. Despite financial challenges, Argentine studios did have some specific competitive advantages, including the country's long tradition of popular theater, especially the short comic plays called sainetes; by offering similar entertainment at a more affordable admission price, local filmmakers could attract an audience that already existed. Additionally, a significant portion of this audience either could not or did not prefer to read subtitles that accompanied English-language films. The gradual consolidation of the film industry impacted other areas of the broader entertainment industry, as the interplay between cinema, radio, and music led to a unified commercial approach, supported by specialized publications, fostering a star system reminiscent of Hollywood but tailored to Argentina.

According to Octavio Getino, the rapid growth of the nascent Argentine film industry was made possible by several factors, which include: the preceding industrial, technical, and commercial experience that, albeit limited, was unparalleled in Latin America; the temporary inability of the United States to retain Spanish-speaking audiences with their films; the popular style and themes of Argentine cinema, which were much more in tune with those of other Latin American countries; and the composition of the primary audience of Argentine cinema, comprising large groups of urban workers, either recently migrated from the country's interior or originating from European immigration.

==== 1936–1942: Rise to international influence ====
The industrialization process was accompanied by standardization in production, going from 6 films released in 1933, to 14 in 1935, 30 in 1937, 41 in 1938, and an average of 50 films per year in the following four years. Following Lumiton, the second company to have its own studios and an industrial production plan was Alfredo Murúa's SIDE, which began producing films at the end of 1935. Between 1936 and 1938, Ferreyra directed a trilogy of tango films for SIDE starring Libertad Lamarque and inspired by the work of Gardel. The first of these films was Ayúdame a vivir (1936), which marked a key moment in the economic history of Argentine cinema, since it "contributed enormously to its popularity throughout Latin America and was the key that finished opening the continental markets in which it expanded the most during its golden age." Followed by Besos brujos (1937) and La ley que olvidaron (1938), Lamarque's films with Ferreyra were the first Argentinian productions to dominate the international Spanish-speaking market. Argentine productions dominated the Latin American market until being overtaken by the Mexican film industry in the mid-1940s.

By the end of 1936, the profitability of the Argentine film industry attracted formerly hostile distributors and exhibitors. The initiator of this was the successful distributor of European films Adolfo Z. Wilson, who formed the company Porteña Films and built his own studios with the initial intent to rent them to other production companies. The following year, the distributor Julio Joly and the owner of movie theater chains Clemente Lococo joined the company, which was renamed Establecimientos Filmadores Argentinos (EFA).

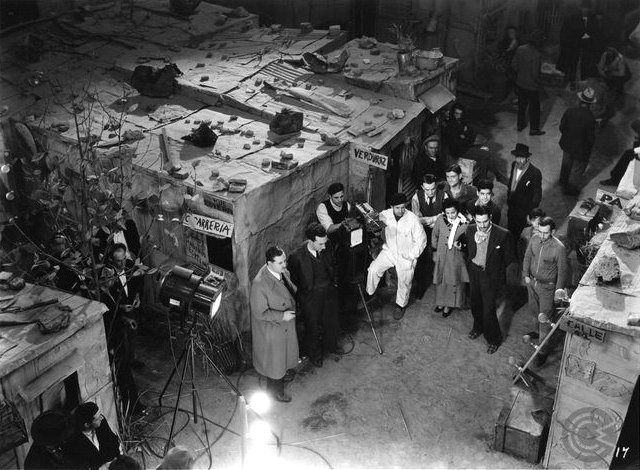
View of the shooting of Argentina Sono Film's Puerto Nuevo (1936), directed by Mario Soffici and Luis César Amadori, at SIDE's studios.

Domingo Di Núbila noted 1937 as a time of great progress for Argentine cinema as it saw over 30 films released which featured Enrique Muiño, Elías Alippi, Ángel Magaña, Florencio Parravicini, Hugo del Carril, Mecha Ortiz, León Zárate, Orestes Caviglia, Luis Arata, José Olarra, Camila Quiroga, Enrique Santos Discépolo, Santiago Gómez Cou and others. Unlike the silent era, there were no female directors during the classical period, as industry leaders firmly prevented their emergence; and the first sound film directed by a woman did not come until 1960 with Vlasta Lah's Las furias. By 1937, there were 9 film studios and 30 production companies in Buenos Aires. One of these was Baires, which was born within the Crítica newspaper, inspired by the William Randolph Hearst model. Founder Eduardo Bedoya appointed Daniel Tinayre as his main advisor and he supervised the construction of Baires' studios in Don Torcuato, Greater Buenos Aires. Therefore, its first production, Tinayre's Mateo (1937), had to be filmed at Lumiton, and Baires would concentrate on the construction of its studios until it produced another film.

Unlike companies such as Lumiton and Baires, which advanced in the construction of studios before being sure of the economic dynamics of the business, Argentina Sono Film was more prudent. In 1937, the company built its own studios and produced eight films. After the success of Riachuelo, Mentasti brought in Arturo S. Mom, who directed films such as Monte criollo (1935), Loco lindo (1936), and Palermo (1937). Moglia Barth returned to Argentina Sono Film after his failure with Picaflor, directing films such as Amalia (1936), ¡Goal! (1936), Melgarejo (1937), Melodías porteñas (1937), and La casa de Quirós (1938), which inaugurated the long trend of Argentine cinema in adapting foreign works. Also in 1936, Argentina Sono Film released the successful Puerto Nuevo, which marked the directorial debut of Luis César Amadori (co-credited with Mario Soffici), who would develop an extensive and successful career throughout the classical period.

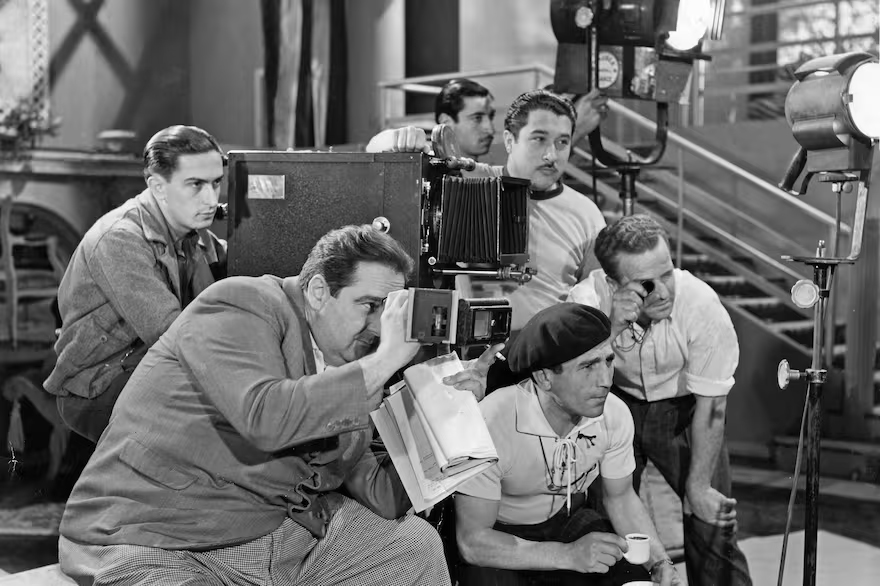
Lumiton technicians during a shoot, c. 1930s.

The year 1938 continued to break production records after the previous year's developments increased the demand for Argentine films in the country and throughout the Spanish-speaking world. In response to the expanding market, the industry intensified its production pace, imported new studio equipment, upgraded laboratories and brought in new filmmakers. That year, 16 new directors debuted, most of them coming from the theater, including Orestes Caviglia, Elías Isaac Alippi, Ivo Pelay, Ernesto Vilches, Edmundo Guibourg and Miguel Coronatto Paz, among others. Manuel Romero emerged as the most prolific filmmaker of the period, strengthening Lumiton with the release of six films between March 1937 and March 1938, including important titles like Los muchachos de antes no usaban gomina (1937), Tres anclados en París (1938) and La rubia del camino (1938). Although the initial idea was that EFA would not produce, in 1938 it released its first film, La vuelta al nido, directed by Leopoldo Torres Ríos. Although it was a commercial failure, Torres Ríos' film was years later revalued as misunderstood by the commercial spirit of its time and a precursor of modern cinema, for its intimate and reflective style and for the naturalist performances of José Gola and Amelia Bence.

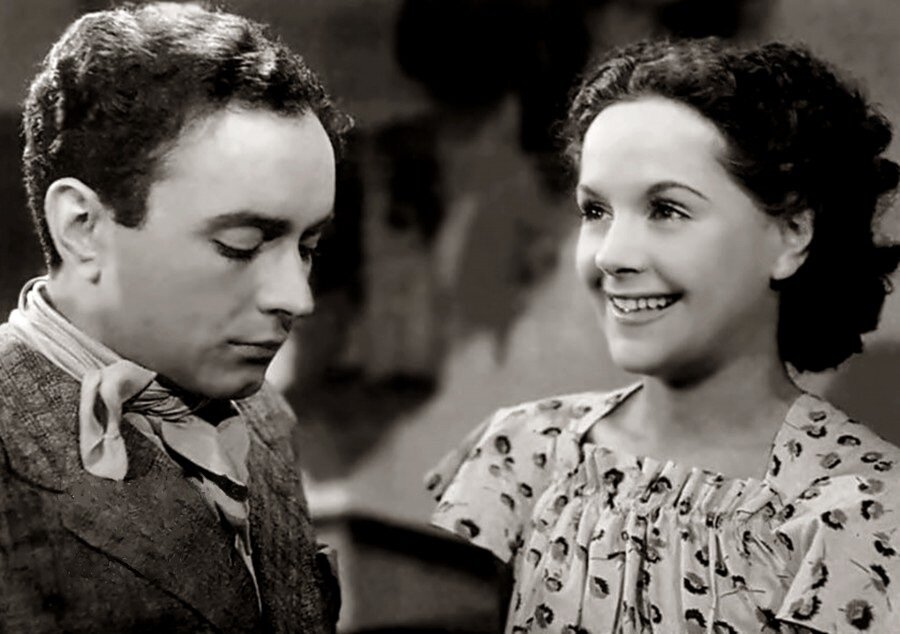
Ángel Magaña and Delia Garcés in Kilómetro 111 (1938), directed by Mario Soffici and produced by Argentina Sono Film.

Soffici was an important filmmaker of this period and directed for Argentina Sono Film El alma del bandoneón (1935), La barra mendocina (1935), Cadetes de San Martín (1937)—with which he experienced censorship for the first time after an army refusal to his original script—and Viento norte (1937).

In 1938, Soffici released social commentary films such as Kilómetro 111 (1938), El viejo doctor (1939) and Héroes sin fama (1940), which gave him greater prestige. However, Soffici's most celebrated film, Prisioneros de la tierra (1939), was released under another production company: Pampa Film. Founded by Olegario Ferrando in 1936, the company's first film was La fuga (1937) by Luis Saslavsky, who also directed Nace un amor (1938), films which sought to distance themselves from the popular cinema of Ferreyra and Romero. Saslavsky also brought Alberto de Zavalía to the company, who directed the successful Los caranchos de la Florida (1938). Pampa Film also hired Enrique de Rosas and Enrique de Rosas Jr., who directed a series of commercial failures. The company managed an improvement the following year with Prisioneros de la tierra, which was hailed as a classic practically from its release.

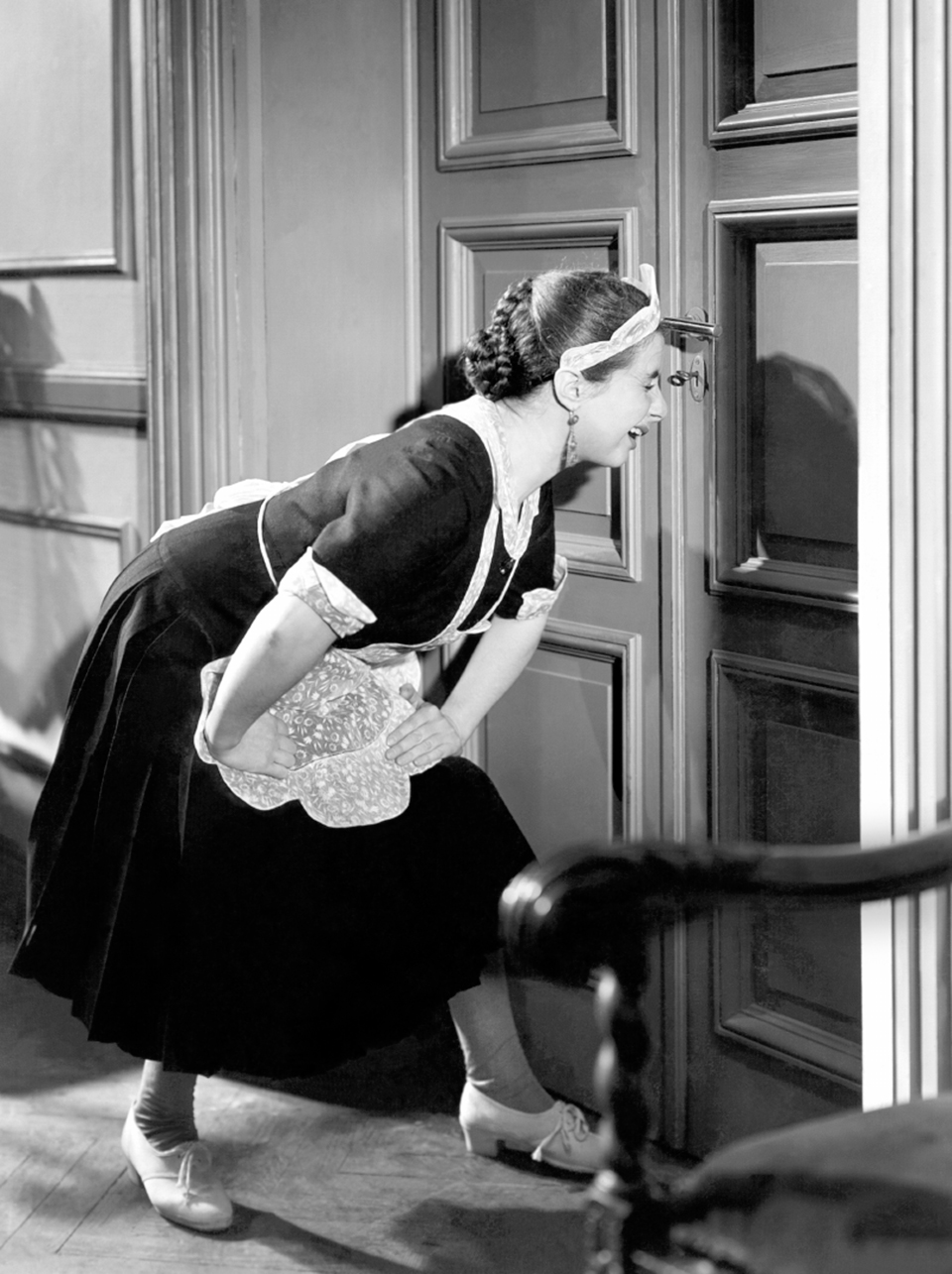
Niní Marshall as her popular character Cándida in the 1939 eponymous film by Luis Bayón Herrera.

In 1939, Argentina became the world's leading producer of Spanish-language films, with a new record of 50 feature films being made, and had consolidated industrial production, an expanding market and its own system of stars, genres and popular authors. In this year, Laboratorios Alex acquired the first flatbed editor in Argentina, and the new system would be progressively adopted by the industry in the following years. The construction of the Estudios San Miguel in Bella Vista, Greater Buenos Aires, the largest studio in Argentina, was finished in 1939.

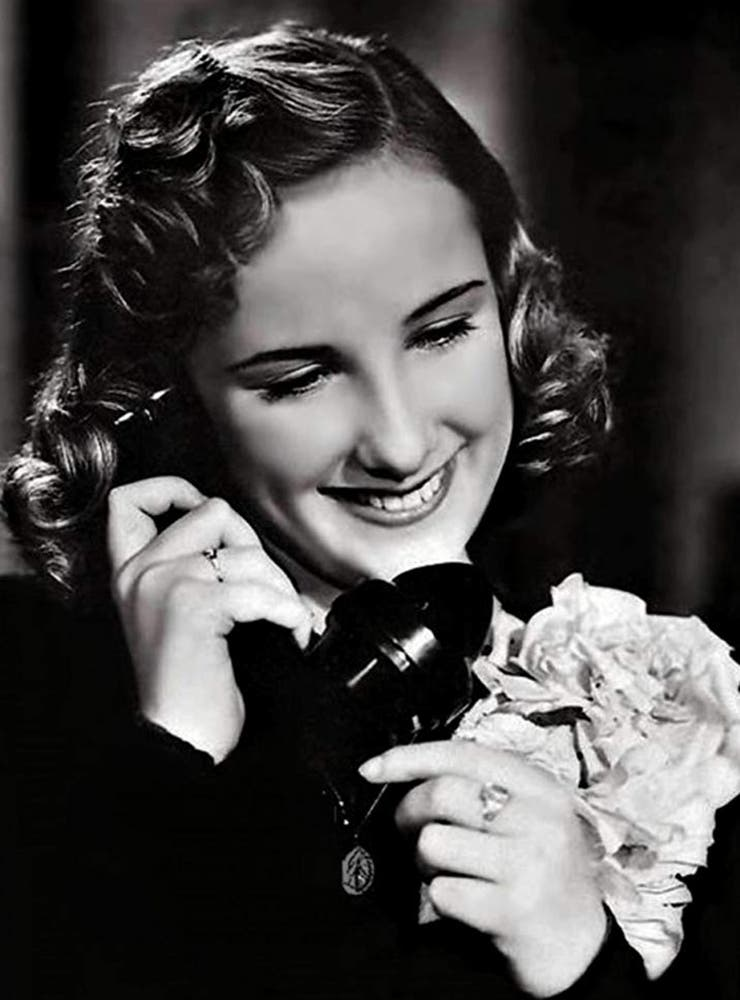
Mirtha Legrand in Los martes, orquídeas (1941), directed by Francisco Mugica and produced by Lumiton.

The new prosperity of Argentine cinema brought about a strong change in the themes and atmospheres that had characterized it until then, appealing to middle-class audiences' taste for aspirational themes and wealthy settings. The major representative of this trend at Lumiton was Francisco Mugica, who directed the successful and influential Así es la vida (1939) and Los martes, orquídeas (1941), while at Argentina Sono Film it was Luis César Amadori, who manufactured successful star vehicles for Pepe Arias, Libertad Lamarque, Luis Sandrini, Hugo del Carril, Niní Marshall and Mirtha Legrand. For its part, EFA cast all the biggest stars of the era by offering them more money than any other production company. The studio's main director was Luis Bayón Herrera, who imitated Manuel Romero's model of making low-cost, fast-production, star-driven films. Examples include Cándida (1939), Los celos de Cándida (1940) and Cándida millonaria (1941), all of them starring Marshall playing her popular comic character. Also at EFA, director Carlos Schlieper had the first important period of his career, with a more refined style than Bayón Herrera. At the end of the 1930s, with Soffici's departure from the company, Argentina Sono Film incorporated Saslavsky and Alberto de Zavalía, who stood out for introducing a more cultured and refined take on commercial filmmaking with titles such as Puerta cerrada (1939), El loco Serenata (1939) and Historia de una noche (1941) in the former, and La vida de Carlos Gardel (1939) in the latter. The sophistication of these two directors in Argentina Sono Film had its counterpart in Lumiton with the incorporation of Carlos Hugo Christensen, who directed films such as Los chicos crecen (1942), Safo, historia de una pasión (1943) and La pequeña señora de Pérez (1944).

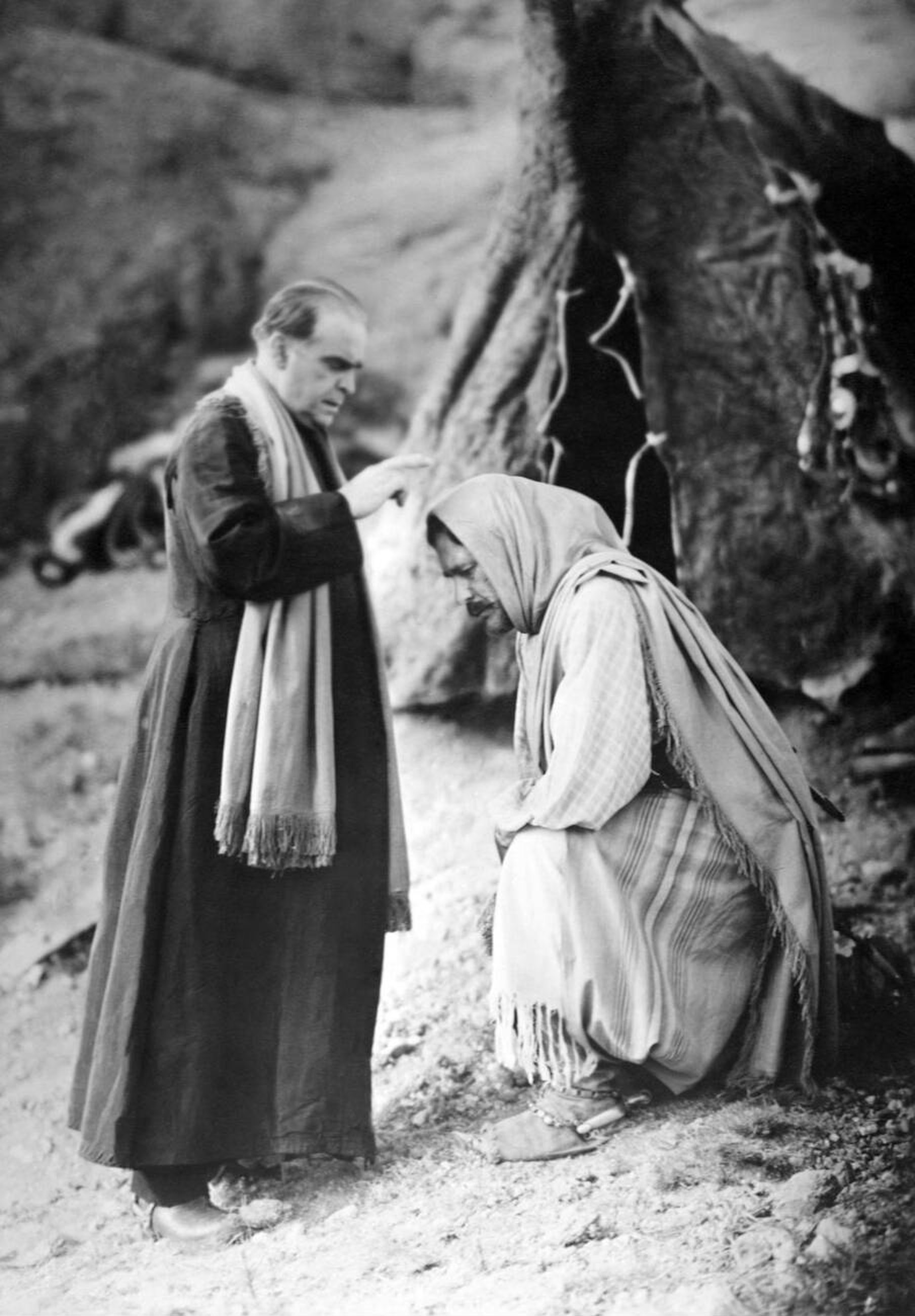
Enrique Muiño and Graciliano Batista in El cura gaucho (1941), directed by Lucas Demare and produced by Pampa Film.

The year 1941 was one of great progress for the Argentine film industry, despite some conflicts between exhibitors that began to monopolize domestic distribution. Several laboratories were modernized, such as Laboratorios Cristiani and Tecnofilm, incorporating automatic film processors, optical printers, a microcinema for dailies, among other innovations. But the most notable advance was that of the Laboratorios Alex following the knowledge acquired by Connio Santini and Alfredo Rosiano in their chemistry university studies in the U.S. This allowed Laboratorios Alex to achieve remarkable quality in their black and white films, and to begin to experiment with the possibility of color. Gradually in the following years, Alex absorbed practically all the work of the Argentine professional film industry. In 1941, the Argentine Academy of Cinematography Arts and Sciences was created, which was inspired by the U.S. Academy of Motion Picture Arts and Sciences, included some of the most prominent names in the industry, and presented its own annual awards ceremony. The first film to receive the academy's Best Picture award was Los martes, orquídeas, while Saslavsky received Best Director for Historia de una noche (1941), with Delia Garcés in Veinte años y una noche (1941) and Enrique Muiño in El cura gaucho (1941) receiving Best Actress and Actor, respectively.

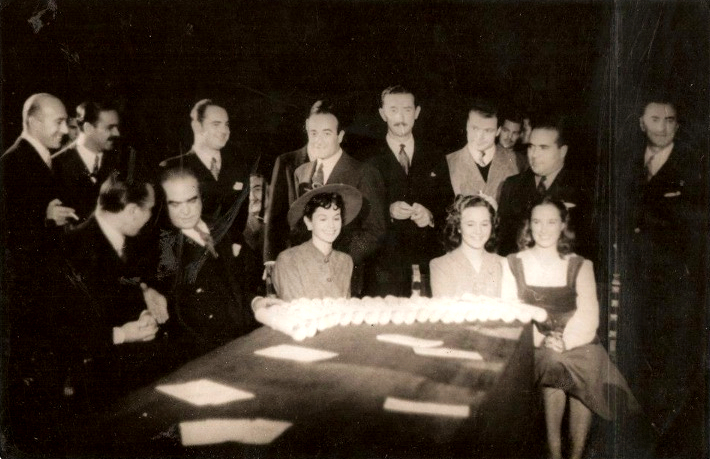
View of the first Argentine Academy Awards in 1942, with Orson Welles, Enrique Muiño, Delia Garcés, María Duval, Mirtha Legrand, Mario Soffici, Luis Saslavsky, Francisco Mugica and Sebastián Chiola in the crowd.

Also in 1941, Artistas Argentinos Asociados (English: "Associated Argentine Artists"; AAA) was established, a production company founded by director Lucas Demare, actors Elías Alippi, Ángel Magaña, Enrique Muiño and Francisco Petrone, and producer Enrique Faustín; while directors Homero Manzi and Ulyses Petit de Murat, assistant director Hugo Fregonese and actor René Mugica also took part informally, among others. According to Peña, they were united by the desire to "take the risks that other companies avoided in order to obtain a cinema of artistic quality that would also be commercial." In 1942, AAA released La guerra gaucha, which was the highest-grossing Argentine film in history and represented the peak of the Golden Age according to Di Núbila. The early 1940s also saw a brief reappearance of the Baires studios, which released a series of box office bombs and soon halted production amid legal disputes. On the other hand, Pampa Film continued its line of nationalist-themed films after Prisioneros de la tierra with titles such as Adelqui Migliar's La carga de los valientes (1940) and La quinta calumnia (1941), and the great success of Demare's El cura gaucho (1941), a biopic of Priest Brochero that was "inserted in the context of a strong discussion on the identity of Argentine cinema." However, in subsequent years the studio made a series of costly but unprofitable productions that would eventually lead to its dissolution.

==== 1942–1955: Industry crisis and state intervention ====
The Argentine film industry was affected by World War II. Several European immigrants who escaped the war joined the Argentine film industry, like musicians George Andreani and Paul Misraki, screenwriter Jacques Rémy, and director Pierre Chenal, who found success with the films Todo un hombre (1943), El muerto falta a la cita (1944), Se abre el abismo (1945) and Viaje sin regreso (1946). Some Argentine films of the period even made reference to the war, although most of them in an allusive way, such as Jewish exile James Bauer's Explosivo 008 (1940), Saslavsky's Ceniza al viento (1942), Mugica's La guerra la gano yo (1943), Carlos Borcosque's La verdadera victoria (1943), Alberto de Zavalía's Concierto de almas (1942) and El fin de la noche (1944), Bayón Herrera's Los dos rivales (1944). When World War II began, the magazine Cine argentino conducted anonymous interviews with industry figures and, although several had optimistic views, others anticipated the problems that the industry would soon face, like the following interviewee:

—The materials used in film production, which we import almost exclusively from Germany, are also used in the war industry. And since Germany is at war, it does not take a fortune teller to predict that the price of celluloid will soon be skyrocketing.
—And it can't be imported from North America?
—Don't be naive! Do you think the Americans are going to provide us with the means to continue competing with them? They will take advantage of the situation. We will have to pay for celluloid at the price of gold. What remains to be seen is whether the price of raw film will rise to the point of forcing us to close the studios...

The evolution of Argentine and Mexican film production between 1933 and 1945, measured in number of feature films released. Since the emergence of industrialization in 1933, Argentine cinema grew exponentially and became the world leader for the production of films in Spanish by 1939. This primacy ended abruptly in 1943, when the United States imposed a boycott on sales of film stock to the country and provided a series of benefits to the Mexican industry. View source data.

In the context of the war, Argentina's success in the Latin American film industry posed a challenge for American policymakers. Argentina's policy of neutrality was influenced by factors such as the Smoot–Hawley Act of 1930, which led to high U.S. tariffs on Argentine imports, fostering anti-American sentiment. This was further exacerbated by the Lend-Lease Act of 1941, where the U.S. provided arms to Argentina's regional rival, Brazil. Despite some right-wing nationalists' pro-Nazi inclinations, Argentina's neutral stance was initially supported by Britain, which relied on Argentine food imports and feared that abandoning neutrality would disrupt trade. However, Argentina's refusal to join the Pan-American alliance and its occasional censorship of Hollywood films at the behest of Germany and Spain fueled U.S. suspicions about South American Fascism and led the Office of the Coordinator of Inter-American Affairs (OCIAA) to counteract by promoting Mexican films over Argentine ones. The U.S. bolstered the Mexican film industry with investment, loans, equipment, and technical assistance, while restricting the export of raw film stock to Argentina, which resulted in severe shortages for national studios and forced them to rely on the more expensive black market. Consequently, Argentine film production plummeted from 56 films in 1942 to only 36 in 1943, while Mexican production rose from 49 to 67 in the same period. By the end of the war, Mexico had firmly supplanted Argentina as the leading producer of Spanish-language films in Latin America, with a significant increase in production. The boycott was beneficial for North American investors who had heavily invested in the Mexican film industry, ensuring that political and commercial interests were closely aligned.

The decline experienced by the Argentine industry compared to the Mexican industry is not attributed only to U.S. intervention, but also to a series of defects in its commercial management. The success of national cinema did not favor the industrial production sector so much as it did the commercial sector of distributors and exhibitors. José Agustín Mahieu noted that the growth of the industry did not increase revenue for productions and that most revenue gains were accrued by the distributors. In 1942, director Luis Saslavsky denounced the business exploitation of filmmakers. The cinema of Mexico, on the other hand, had begun to adopt a more favorable long-term policy for its development, through direct state management of production, distribution and exhibition companies, unlike the free market that reigned in Argentine cinema. For example, since 1942 the country had the National Film Bank (Spanish: Banco Nacional Cinematográfico), which helped finance the productions.

Orestes Caviglia and Enrique Muiño in Su mejor alumno (1944), directed by Lucas Demare and produced by Artistas Argentinos Asociados.

Throughout the 1930s, the Argentine state had remained largely on the sidelines of the development of the film industry. This situation began to change following the 1943 military coup. By ushering in a nationalist government that rejected liberal economic principles, the coup laid the groundwork for the state to protect the Argentine film industry. The new military government created the Undersecretariat of Information and Press of the Presidency, which included a General Directorate of Public Shows with three divisions: Cinema, Theater and Control. After the end of World War II, the United States still maintained its raw film stock restrictions on Argentina. Faced with a shortage of raw film stock, studios attempted negotiations with domestic theater chains for improved terms; when these negotiations faltered, the matter was escalated to Juan Domingo Perón's Secretariat of Labor and Welfare. In response, Perón issued a decree favoring the studios, instituting a percentage rental system and mandating a quota of Argentine films to be shown in theaters. This decree, with slight modifications, would significantly shape the film industry following Perón's election to the presidency in 1946.

A 1947 law mandated that domestic films constitute 25% of screen time in first-run porteño theaters and 40% elsewhere in the country. Simultaneously, the Banco de Crédito Industrial initiated financing options for domestic film producers, while producers also received a substantial subsidy funded by a minor fee added to ticket prices. Through the implementation of this law, the established legal and official parameters for the development of the Argentine film industry were set. Although these measures didn't restore international sales, they successfully revitalized film production levels: in 1950, the industry released 56 films, finally reaching the peak it had attained in 1942.

According to Matthew B. Karush, there was a tendency to produce low-budget films due to limited capitalization and the idiosyncrasies of Argentina's protectionist framework. These films, reliant on subsidies, were assured screen time irrespective of their quality. The Peronist government actively pursued a moralizing and nationalistic agenda in the domestic cinema. Films deemed to be "of national interest" were granted privileged access to government credit, and the government centralized the distribution of raw film stock, favoring specific producers. By 1949, with the appointment of Raúl Alejandro Apold, former press chief for Argentina Sono Film, as the undersecretary of information and press, the regime had effectively shaped a film industry where every artistic decision fell under political control. According to Clara Kriger, a researcher on the little-frequented subject of cinema and Peronism, there "was no written decalogue and there was no prior censorship", although "everyone knew that there were things that could not be said" and, in any case, what could happen was that the authorities would not give credit to certain screenplays. It was a tacit but existing censorship, which occurred not only for political but also for religious or other reasons.

Lumiton, which had been the country's first film studio, was also the first to succumb to the production crisis and was sold in 1949. It continued operating under new ownership, though with reduced activity, until its bankruptcy in 1952. The brand survived into the early 1960s, occasionally functioning as a distributor, while the studio facilities were mainly used for advertising productions before being leased to a trouser factory. Estudios San Miguel reached its artistic peak shortly before its closure. Under producer Manuel Alba it released La barra de la esquina (1950), directed by Julio Saraceni and remembered as one of Alberto Castillo's most notable films. Lucas Demare followed with Los isleros (1951), based on a script by Ernesto L. Castro, which became a landmark in Tita Merello's career. Around the same time, Carlos Hugo Christensen directed two acclaimed noir films adapted from William Irish stories, No abras nunca esa puerta (1952) and Si muero antes de despertar (1952). Despite these achievements, the studio went bankrupt in 1951. Estudios EFA, by contrast, lacked consistent critical success, and most productions ranged from uneven to unsuccessful. After the sale of the studio in 1951, its new owners continued sporadic production before operations ceased, and the original building was later adapted as the headquarters of Canal 13 television.

=== End and aftermath (1956–1962) ===
In 1955, Perón was overthrown by the Revolución Libertadora, which installed a military dictatorship. Contemporaries emphasize that the regime's impact on cinema was less a direct "mission" against film than a revelation and acceleration of a crisis that was already unfolding as the studio system unraveled. Under this new government, several exiled artists returned to Argentina, such as Francisco Petrone and María Rosa Gallo, while others remained abroad, such as Libertad Lamarque and Carlos Hugo Christensen. Figures such as Luis César Amadori and Zully Moreno went into exile while Hugo del Carril faced reprisals for his links with Peronism. The new government eliminated film subsidies, deregulated the sale of raw film stock and dissolved Peronist film policies without offering clear alternatives. In practice, this vacuum sharpened intra-sector conflicts: labor groupings and producers lobbied—sometimes through "independent" emissaries—over replacement mechanisms, and when the existing "social aid and film promotion" pact expired on 13 April 1956, exhibitors refused renewal, precipitating a production halt with only carryover releases reaching screens. This aggravated conflicts within the sector, where divisions arose between producers and directors.

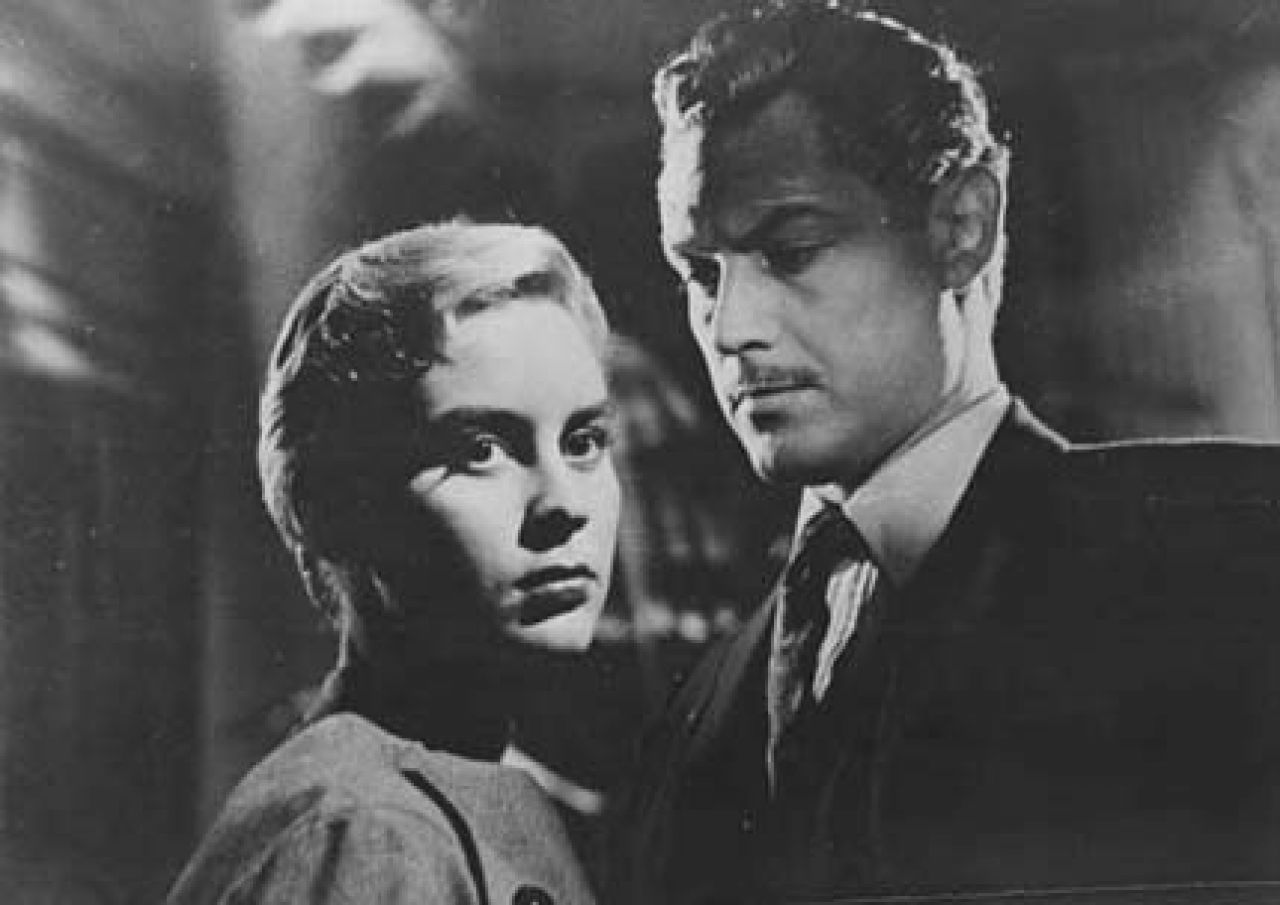
Elsa Daniel and Lautaro Murúa in La casa del ángel (1957), directed by Leopoldo Torre Nilsson and produced by Argentina Sono Film.

By 1956, the economic measures introduced by the new dictatorship triggered a crisis that the film industry was unable to overcome, as major production companies closed, sold their studios, and much of their film archives were dispersed or lost. The only releases in 1956 were films made the previous year and there were only 15 national premieres in 1957. The end of the industrial era of Argentine cinema was foreseeable as before the coup, most of the "big studios" had already closed or stopped production, and the few that remained were still afloat thanks to state support. Most films were made, as in the silent and early sound films, through isolated projects, where production companies were created to make one or two films, but these productions could not be considered "independent" because they only existed due to state support and did not represent a real alternative to the industrial model. They were, in essence, products that imitated the industry, but lacked a real industrial infrastructure, and featured a variety of companies instead of the few that existed previously.

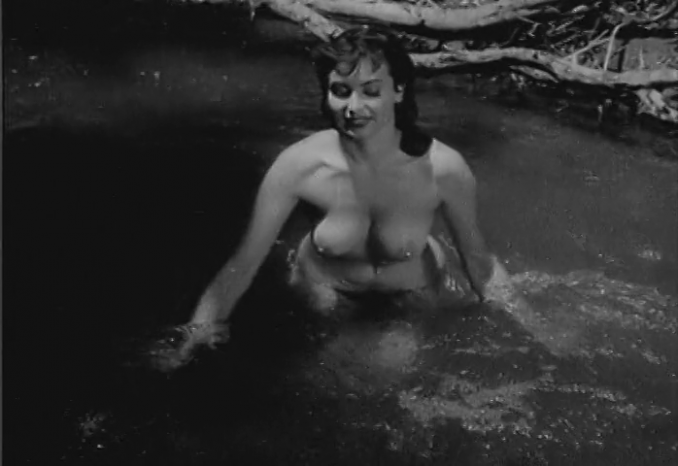
Isabel Sarli in Armando Bó's El trueno entre las hojas (1958), starring in the first fully nude scene in Argentine cinema.

The market was mutating as early television experiments began to complicate theatrical windows, distributors probed co-productions with Europe and Latin America to extend reach with uneven results, and producers tested widescreen and color even as black-and-white and standard ratios remained preferred for personal or socially critical projects. This transitional climate also fostered thematic ventures into the provinces, where cameras sought "authentic" landscapes in Catamarca, Jujuy or Tucumán. The period from 1957 to 1960 has been generally considered by Argentine film historians as one of passage between classical and modern cinema, often without going deeper into those conceptions. A pervasive but ill-defined demand for "authenticity" dominated criticism and programming rhetoric, frequently used to censure industrial formulae without clear criteria; by 1960, recognition of the director's authorial mark (auteur) provided a new evaluative framework that helped steady the debate. According to film historian María Valdez, during that period local cinema appeared to "had fallen prey to a kind of generalized derangement, where anything could find a place." Lucas Demare's Después del silencio (1956) and Detrás de un largo muro (1958) pursued social realism, while classic-era actor turned director Armando Bó's El trueno entre las hojas (1958) introduced Isabel Sarli and inaugurated a cycle of erotic melodramas that would challenge censorship under the guise of morality. In El trueno entre las hojas, Sarli performed Latin America's first full-frontal nude scene, launching her long partnership with Bó, whose internationally recognized sexploitation films secured her lasting status as a national sex symbol.

Film historian Mariano Calistro proposed in 1984 an alternative periodization for the years immediately after the classical era, extending from 1957 to 1968, grounded in the historical trajectory of the period's filmmakers and the shifting affinities of their often loosely defined groups of belonging. Some writers consider the premiere of Leopoldo Torre Nilsson's La casa del ángel in 1957 as a turning point in Argentine cinema, marking the beginning of a new stage with a different proposal both in style and conception. Nilsson's early cycle, scripted with Beatriz Guido, including La caída (1959) and La mano en la trampa (1960), consolidated a fracture with the classical-industrial model by placing interior conflicts and adolescent subjectivities at the center of the narrative. Parallel to this, Fernando Ayala, often paired with Héctor Olivera, set up Aries Cinematográfica to operate within the emerging regulatory framework. With El jefe (1958) and El candidato (1959), Ayala modeled a sustainable production firm that balanced social allegory with industrial continuity. Such projects proved crucial to stabilizing the sector and to anchoring the broader passage into modern cinema. In 1957, the government enacted Decree Law 62/57, with measures to promote national cinematography as an industry, art and means of dissemination. Passed after hard bargaining among guilds, producers and technicians, the decree created the National Institute of Cinematography (INC) to administer financing and regulation, equated cinematic freedom with press freedom, and earmarked a 10% levy on ticket sales to capitalize production credits, selective subsidies, promotion and an official film school. A later rule capping credits at one feature per company per year prompted larger firms to split into multiple labels to qualify, while "quality awards" tied to funding nudged average standards upward.

In the early 1960s a new generation of filmmakers who opposed "commercial" cinema and experimented with unconventional cinematic techniques emerged. The new trend, initially known as New Argentine Cinema (Spanish: "nuevo cine argentino") and later as the Generation of '60 (Spanish: "Generación del '60"), was not a unified movement and included a series of directors who made their feature film debut between the late 1950s and early 1960s, including Enrique Dawi with Río abajo (1960), Simón Feldman with El negoción (1959) and Los de la mesa diez (1960), David Kohon with Prisioneros de una noche (1962) and Tres veces Ana (1961), José Martínez Suárez with El crack (1960), Dino Minitti with Tiernas ilusiones (1961), René Mugica with El centroforward murió al amanecer (1961), and Lautaro Murúa with Shunko (1960) and Alias Gardelito (1961). By the mid-1960s, critics already spoke of the "end" of this first wave, yet its imprint was durable. Cine-clubs such as Núcleo and journals like Tiempo de Cine elevated the debates around modern cinema, while INC subsidies, short-film grants from the 1958 Fondo Nacional de las Artes, and project-based production models institutionalized many of the practices pioneered by the Generation of '60. These legacies shaped subsequent directors and ensured that, even after the movement's critical exhaustion, its ethos remained embedded in Argentine film culture.

== Style and themes ==
=== 1933–1939: Tango and working-class culture ===
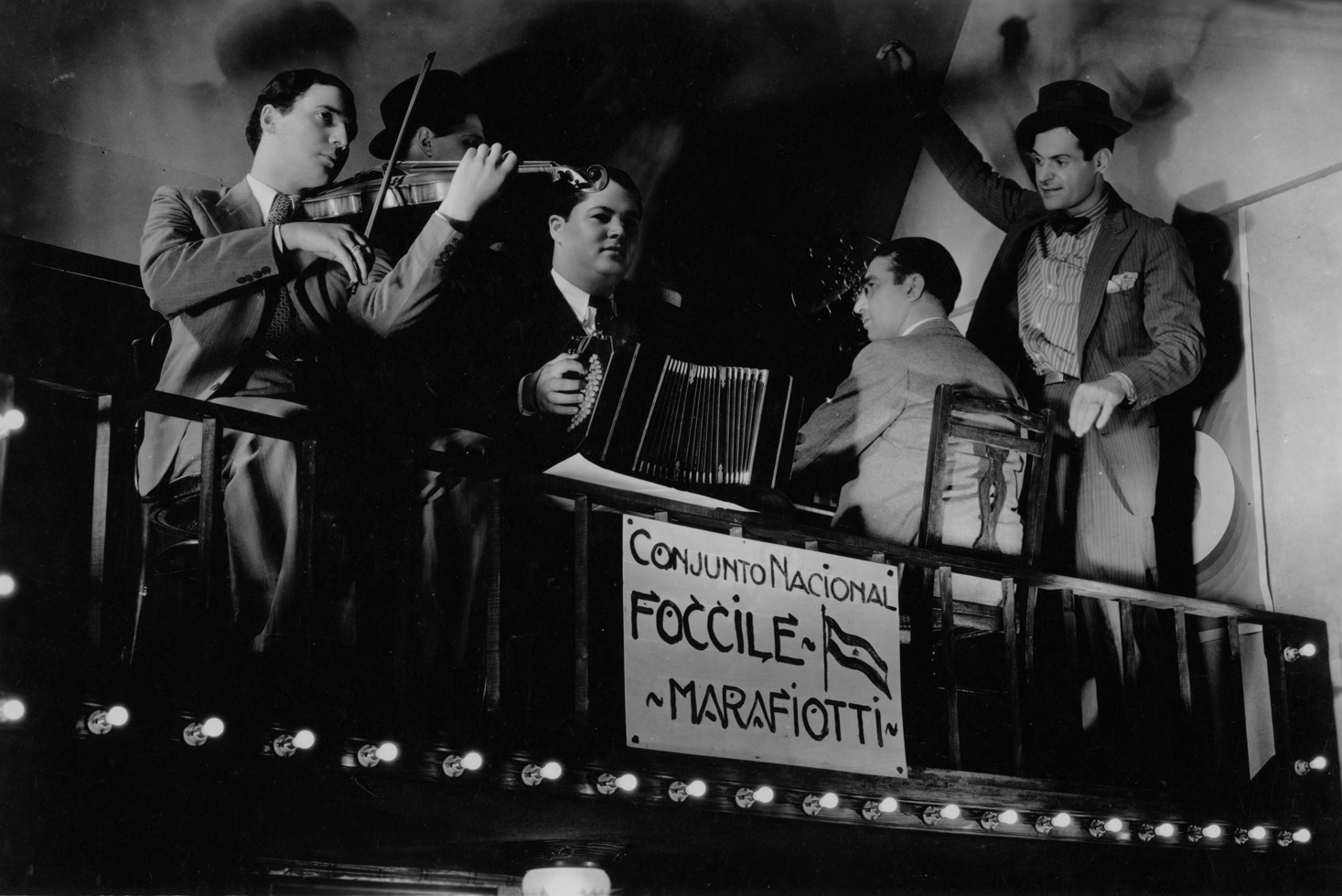
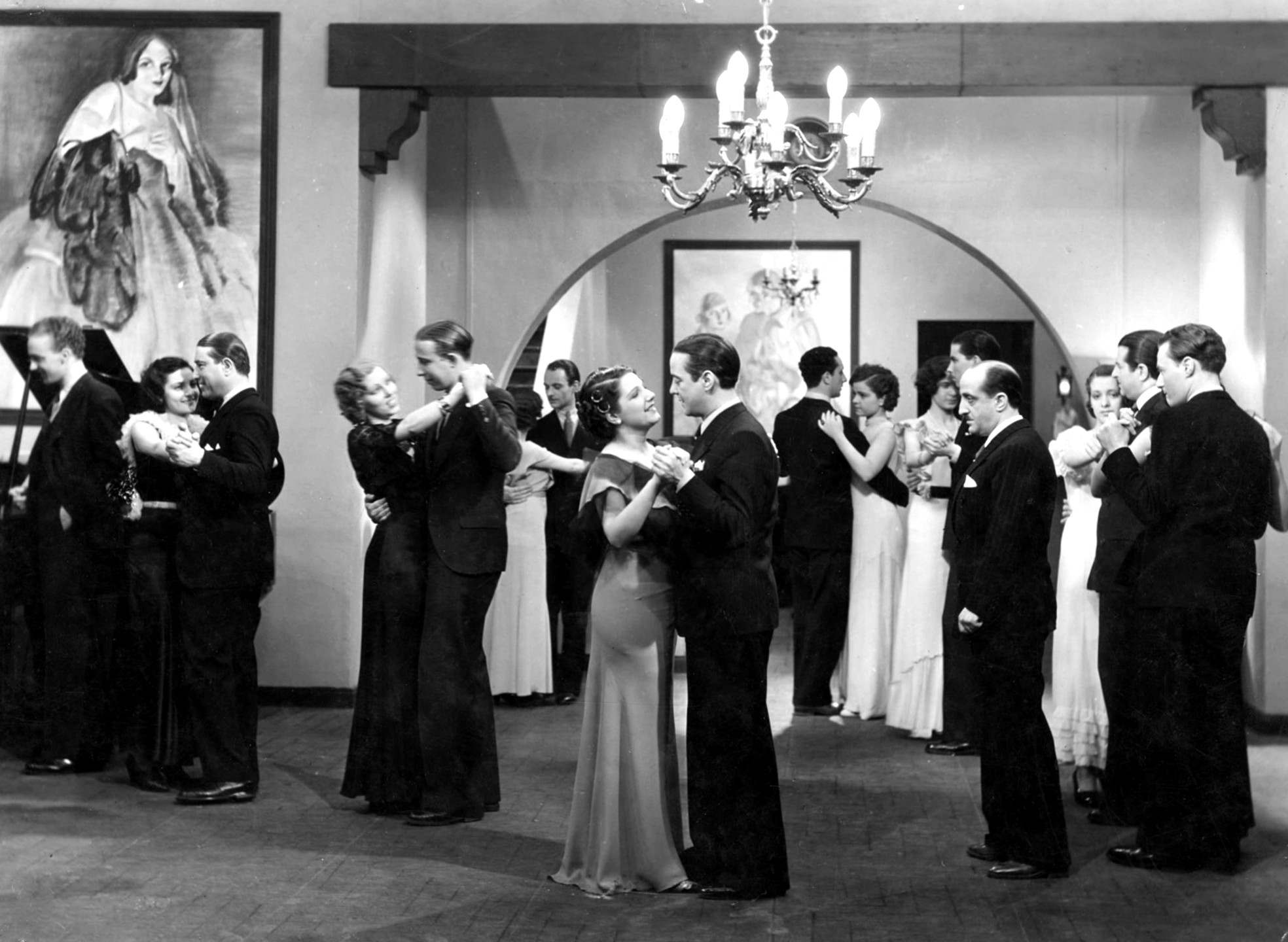
Musical numbers in Los tres berretines (1933) (left) and El alma del bandoneón (1935) (right). The early films of classical Argentine cinema were aimed at the porteño working classes, incorporating the popular tango music as one of its main attractions.

The Argentine cinema of the 1930s was characterized by a deliberate effort to portray the working classes, which, in turn, emerged as its main consumers.

The first Argentine sound films were strongly linked to theatrical performances, which was reflected in their staging and acting style. As noted by Karush: "Domestic filmmakers benefited from the long tradition of popular theater in Argentina, particularly the short comic plays known as sainetes; by providing comparable entertainment at a lower admission price, they could capture an already existing audience." In early classical films like ¡Tango! (1933), Radio bar (1936) and Por buen camino (1935), the "actors speak, move and gesticulate as if they were on a theatrical stage. The camera was limited to capturing those gestures and attitudes (which today seem excessive or exaggerated), often in fixed general shots, so that the actors could move without risk of going out of frame." Some critics, such as Domingo Di Núbila, identified these "narrative weaknesses" in terms of "backwardness" in relation to the cinema of other countries. On the other hand, writer Mario Berardi suggests that it was actually a moment of "creative freedom", in which filmmakers "made use of the impunity of the 'no one knows' to freely appropriate the resources of the new medium. On the contrary, in the 40s and 50s, filmmakers submitted to the canons of the industry, giving rise to a homogeneous and strongly structured mode of representation." According to Ricardo García Oliveri, the directors of the early sound period "have in common the intuition, the enthusiasm and the sense of the popular. These directors generally come from the middle class and they all coincide, at this stage, in a naive cinema, considered ordinary by the upper classes and hardly costumbrist by the aesthetes, but with virtues that are not harmed by its eminently local content."

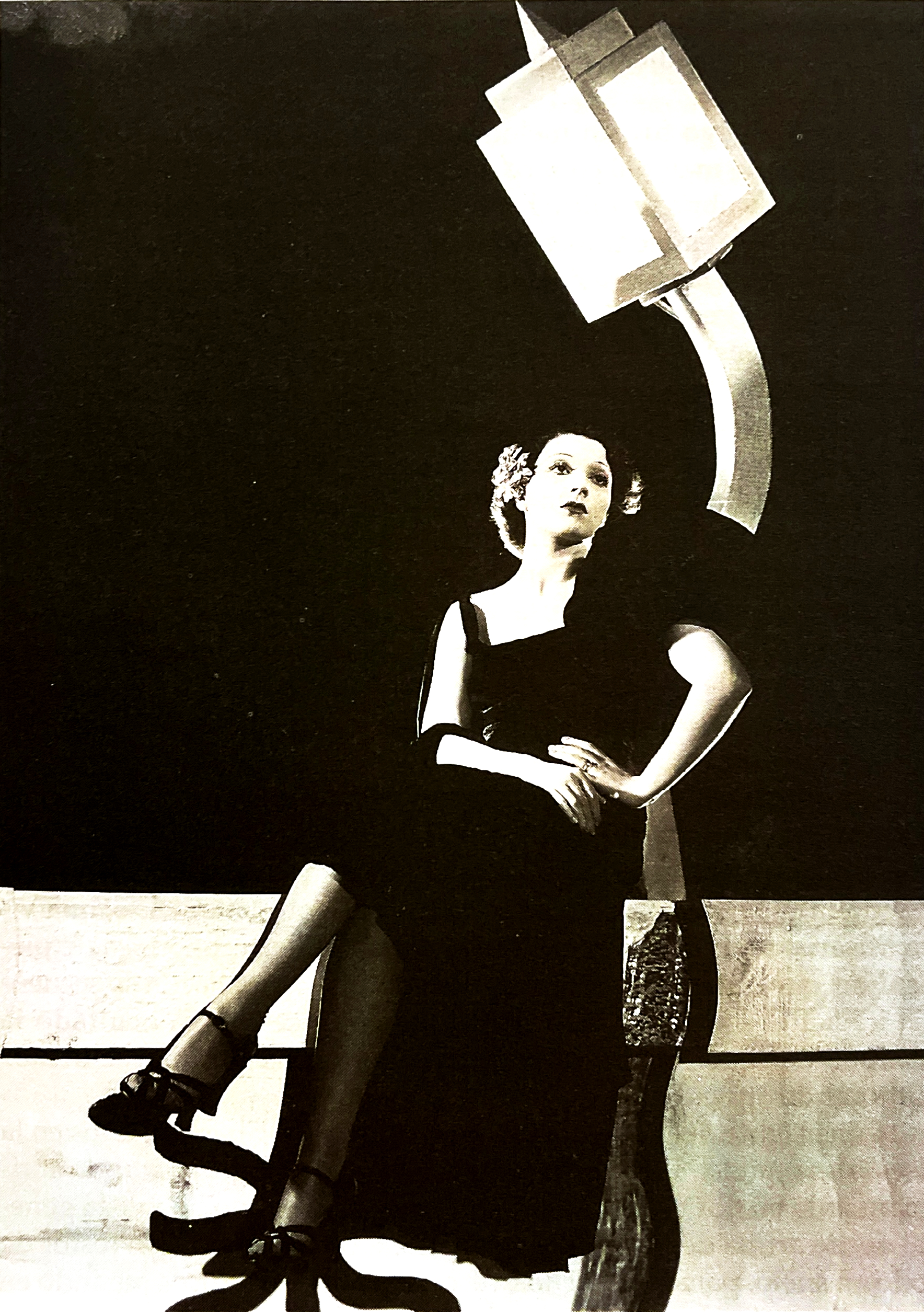
Alicia Vignoli in Soffici and Amadori's Puerto Nuevo (1936), a tango melodrama set in a villa miseria (i.e., shanty town or slum) at the port of Buenos Aires.

Sound technology broadened cinema's appeal by making films accessible to immigrants and to audiences of varying levels of literacy. For many spectators, cinema became an arena for social integration, offering models of speech, behavior and social aspiration. The early sound period thus drew heavily on the theater and radio, encouraging stage and radio performers to cross over into film. It required directors with an overarching vision, as well as scenographers and costume designers capable of imbuing productions with social prestige and period detail. Music became an essential communicative element, while editing was conceived not only as a technical process but also as the arena where ideological frameworks and generic conventions were established. The institutionalization of narrative followed what film theorist Noël Burch has termed the "institutional mode of representation", privileging transparency and immersion. Argentine classical cinema sought to present stories without noticeable mediation, allowing audiences to identify directly with characters and situations. Although later decades would expose fissures in this model, during the 1930s the dominant trend was to minimize the visible presence of the author and privilege collective identification. The approach was aimed particularly at the urban middle and working-class audiences, who found in cinema both entertainment and a framework for imagining themselves as Argentines. The star system was central to this process, and by the late 1930s an extensive constellation of actors and actresses provided Argentine cinema with a distinctive repertoire of recognizable personas that embodied class, gender and ethnic archetypes.

Shooting of a scene of Los muchachos de antes no usaban gomina (1937), directed by Manuel Romero, a film centered on the lowly settings of Buenos Aires in the early 20th century where the tango emerged.

Unlike American cinema, Argentine industrial cinema was slow to structure its production in the well-defined matrices of film genres. Peña noted that, although in terms of production the Argentine industry wanted to resemble that of the US and France, it "owes less to these other cinematographies than to its strong links with tango, radio or revue, forms of popular art from which many of its main performers, directors and screenwriters came. These roots not only conditioned a certain aesthetic in a particular way, but also the configuration of the various genres, which are almost always hybrids." Gardel's success with Paramount was also extremely influential, as it showed Argentine filmmakers that by focusing on local authenticity, settings, and dialects, they could effectively compete with Americans, taking advantage of actors "who were often recognizable to filmgoers from their previous careers in theater and radio". The first defined genre of Argentine cinema consisted of a "sentimental narrative structure originated in the tango", which has been called the "tango melodrama" (Spanish: melodrama tanguero). This style had its antecedents in the silent films of the 1920s, especially in the work of José A. Ferreyra, focused on portraying the world and characters associated with tango, a genre linked to the lower-class neighborhoods of Buenos Aires. According to Karush, Argentine classical cinema, and national mass culture of the 1930s as a whole, was most significantly influenced by melodrama. This cultural mode not only shaped the aesthetic of media content but also reflected a society starkly divided by class. Local producers, while adopting styles from the United States, often portrayed an Argentina where class divides were insurmountable, even with hard work. Argentine films promoted consumerist dreams but simultaneously critiqued the moral failings of the wealthy. The authenticity of cultural products was tied to their roots in the lower-class neighborhoods, emphasizing a narrative of class struggle. Tango, a key element of this period's culture, often told tales of moral corruption and downfall linked to the opulence of the rich, contrasting with the purity and solidarity of the poor. Melodrama's conventions were not just limited to cinema; they permeated radio, poetry, theater, and even circus performances, highlighting emotional excess and a clear division between the rich and the poor. This portrayal of Argentina as a rigidly stratified society was a stark contrast to the more nuanced, fluid class interactions in Buenos Aires neighborhoods of the time.

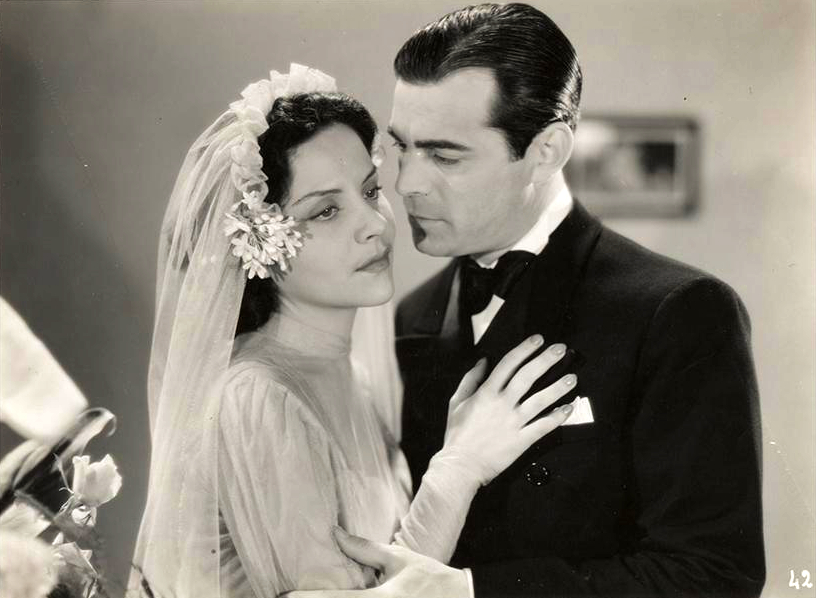
José Gola and Amelia Bence in La vuelta al nido (1938), directed by Leopoldo Torres Ríos. Initially withheld from release and a commercial failure, it was later celebrated for its unconventional narrative.

Immigration was a recurrent theme in early sound films, reflecting both optimism and ambivalence about Argentina's social composition. Portrayals of foreigners oscillated between affirmations of immigrant contribution to the middle class and tragic or grotesque depictions of failure. Urban nightlife was another important motif, with cabarets, theaters and brothels serving as settings for moral lessons and melodramatic conflicts. At the same time, the home was consistently depicted as the guarantor of virtue, education, and stability, often contrasted with the corruption or frivolity of the upper classes. Literary and theatrical adaptations were abundant, ranging from local authors such as Florencio Sánchez and Enrique Larreta to international figures including Ibsen, Balzac and García Lorca. Theater provided not only source material but also a steady flow of performers. Tango, however, was the cultural form most central to Argentine sound cinema, linking the worlds of stage, radio, record, and film. Films like El alma del bandoneón (1935) and Besos brujos (1937) combined musical performance with melodrama, reinforcing tango's association with lower-class neighborhoods and narratives of moral corruption and downfall. By the late 1930s, filmmakers such as Mario Soffici and Luis Saslavsky pushed stylistic and thematic boundaries. Prisioneros de la tierra (1939), based on stories by Horacio Quiroga, combined realism with poetic imagery in its depiction of exploited yerba mate workers, while Puerta cerrada (1939) introduced sophisticated use of flashbacks to narrate the tragic trajectory of a tango singer, Nina Miranda, played by Lamarque. Leopoldo Torres Ríos' La vuelta al nido (1938) anticipated modernist sensibilities with its restrained tone and depiction of urban alienation. These works signaled that, even within a studio-driven system, directors could assert individual styles.

Camila Quiroga and Ángel Magaña in Mario Soffici's Viento norte (1937), a historical epic that helped establish the "social-folkloric drama" style.

Over time, the rural–urban divide that had characterized silent cinema gave way to depictions of the countryside as either a site of retreat for urban dwellers or the stage for historical epics. Aside from tango-based films, film scholars, notably Ana Laura Lusnich, have also identified another important genre of the classical era of Argentine cinema, the so-called drama social-folclórico (English: "social-folkloric drama"), a local variant of the epic film that was prevalent between 1933 and 1956. The social-folkloric drama emerged as a distinctive style that weaved together influences from established cinematic traditions and local artistic expressions, such as literature, theater, and visual arts. It is defined by straightforward narratives that progress through a defined temporal and spatial journey, featuring protagonists whose lives are deeply intertwined with their social surroundings. The visual and auditory elements are crafted to heighten the storytelling and emotional impact, while the narrative structure often incorporates framed tales that create a unified whole. This model frequently delves into cultural tensions like civilization versus barbarism and rural versus urban life, reflecting broader societal themes. Within this framework, two main variants stand out: biographical films, which portray either historical figures or popular heroes, and historical dramas, encompassing stories of independence struggles, social and economic conflicts, or romantic intrigues, showcasing the versatility of this cinematic approach. Examples include biographical films such as Su mejor alumno (1944) and Santos Vega vuelve (1947); films set during the Independence era such as Viento norte (1937), La guerra gaucha (1942) and Pampa bárbara (1945); and films focused on socioeconomic conflict such as Kilómetro 111 (1938), Prisioneros de la tierra (1939), El cura gaucho (1941) and Las aguas bajan turbias (1952), among others.

=== 1939–1945: Turn to bourgeois topics ===
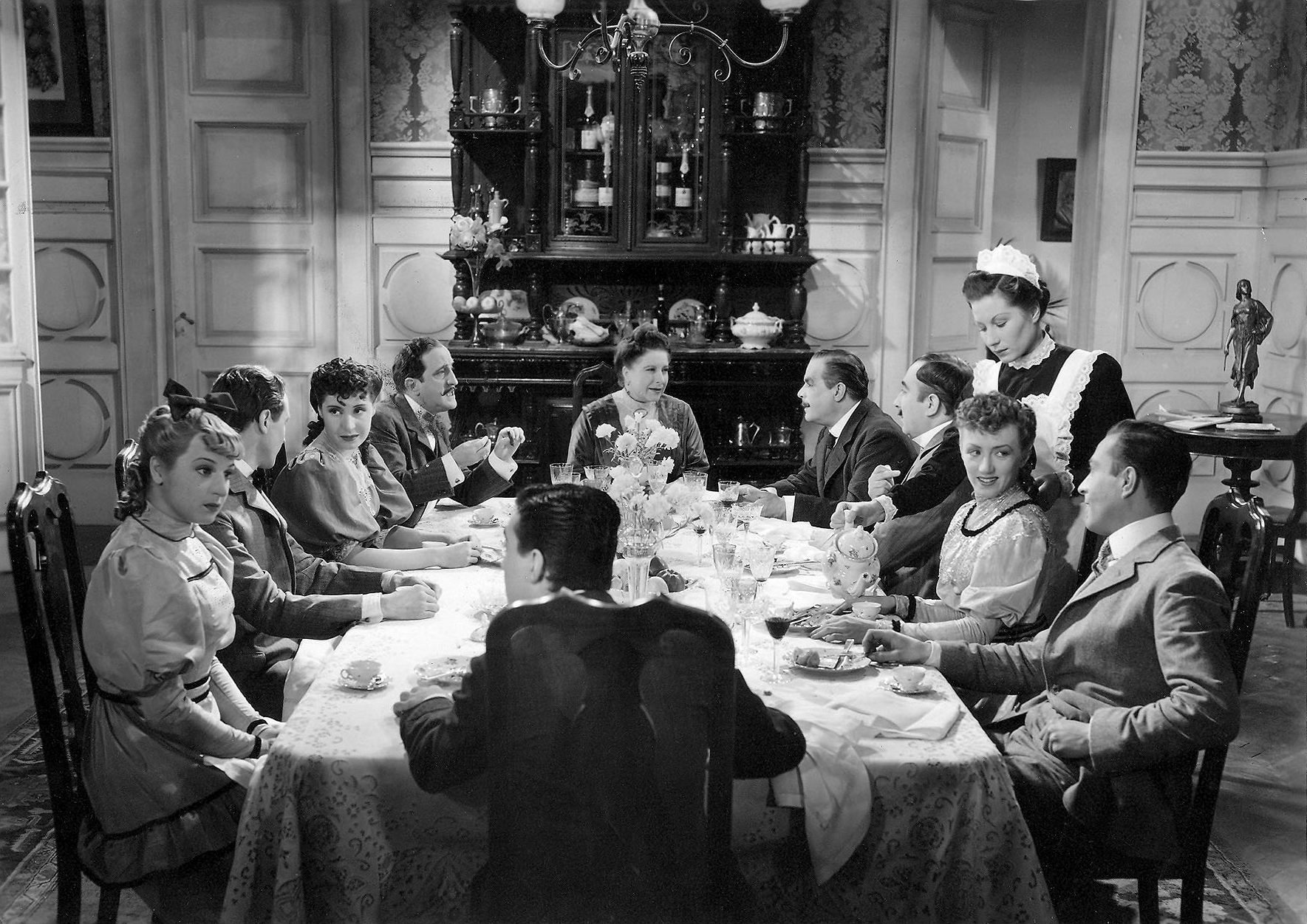
A scene from Francisco Mugica's Así es la vida (1939), which marked a turning point in the adoption of bourgeois settings.

By the early 1940s, audiences had shifted significantly: the majority of cinema-goers were women and children, and studios increasingly tailored films to domestic, family-oriented consumption. Argentina Sono Film promoted itself as "a family that makes films for families", while Lumiton emphasized its orientation toward more cosmopolitan themes.

The release of Así es la vida (1939) is regarded as a turning point for the themes, stars, directors and representation universes in Argentine cinema. For the first time, the ascending middle class and the bourgeoisie emerged as protagonists who elicited empathy and identification from the audience, in contrast to previous cinema that criticized and portrayed the upper classes as villains. Unlike the ruling classes depicted in Manuel Romero's films, associated with the imagery of an elite land-owning oligarchy, the protagonists of Así es la vida belong to an industrial and professional bourgeoisie, something that promoted ideas of social ascent and appealed to the middle classes, through its celebration of hard work and family unity. The film did not target differentiated audiences but encompassed both lower and middle to upper-class sectors, allowing identification for the latter while also shaping specific imaginations and aspirations; by integrating modernity into the national reality, it reconciled both factors through the exaltation of the family as a point of balance.

The box-office and critical success of Así es la vida led to the proliferation of films that sought to imitate its style, such as Alberto de Zavalía's Dama de compañía, Luis Bayón Herrera's Mi fortuna por un nieto and Mugica's Medio millón por una mujer, all of them premiering in 1940. However, none of these productions managed to replicate the success of Así es la vida, and debates persisted in the specialized press regarding the need to renew Argentine cinema without alienating the working classes. These debates and problems seemed to be settled with the release of Los martes, orquídeas (1941), which was a success with both audiences and critics, and even had an American remake the following year, titled You Were Never Lovelier. The film opened the doors to a new style that would enjoy great success during the 1940s: that of the so-called "bourgeois comedy" (Spanish: comedia burguesa). In particular, Los martes, orquídeas was the initiator and main exponent of the so-called cine de ingenuas (which may be translated to "ingénue cinema" or "cinema of naive women"), the first dominant model adopted by the bourgeois comedy in Argentine cinema. The cine de ingenuas introduced new themes, scenarios and imagery for the local film industry, largely thanks to the incorporation of teenage girl debutantes in leading roles. The new genre was based on the already internationally known "ingénue" type, defined as a "beautiful, pure, generous and virginal adolescent girl, who has not yet come into contact with the world." In Italy, it had its greatest exponent with the so-called Telefoni Bianchi films (Italian for "white telephones"), while American actress Deanna Durbin became a paradigmatic example of international presence. Beyond the central figure of the ingénue, the innovation of the cine de ingenuas was to radically alter the development of stories and imaginaries in local cinema, as the 1930s trend of criticizing the upper classes was abandoned in favor of depicting them as an idyllic space, where the bourgeois family served as a moral beacon for tradition in the face of the dangers of modernity.

Los martes, orquídeas was followed by other productions that introduced young female actresses, including Nury Montsé in Canción de cuna (1941), Nelly Hering in Secuestro sensacional!!! (1942) or Mariana Martí in Dieciséis años (1943). One of the main strategies in the search for new attractions were the contests promoted by magazines or companies, from which the main figures of the genre emerged: Mirtha Legrand (a main reference point after her debut in Los martes, orquídeas) and María Duval, the two actresses who most frequently embodied the ingénue role under the process of typecasting and were also incorporated into the star system. Unlike these two, the other actresses who were pigeonholed as ingenuas took part in films with more varied narrative and ideological proposals. Within the cine de ingenuas, Duval became the main star associated with the "family comedy" genre, starring in titles such as Cada hogar, un mundo (1942), Su primer baile (1942) and Casi un sueño (1943); while Legrand was the leading figure in romantic comedy, starring in titles written specifically for her ingénue figure, such as El viaje (1942), Claro de luna (1942) or Adolescencia (1942).

Although it has often been underestimated by historians, the cine de ingenuas was a genre of great relevance in Argentine cinema between 1941 and 1945, reaching 20% of national film production in 1942. However, it soon declined due to several factors, such as the increasing age of the genre's stars, the overexploitation of the same themes, and its evasion of the modern world at a time of transition for Argentine society. In response to this, the developers of the genre decided to turn to urban melodramas with a central sexual component, or to zany comedies with modern rather than naive girls. The pioneer in this sense was Carlos Hugo Christensen, with titles such as Safo, historia de una pasión (1943), Dieciséis años (1943) and La pequeña señora de Pérez (1944).

=== 1945–1956: International aspirations and Peronism ===
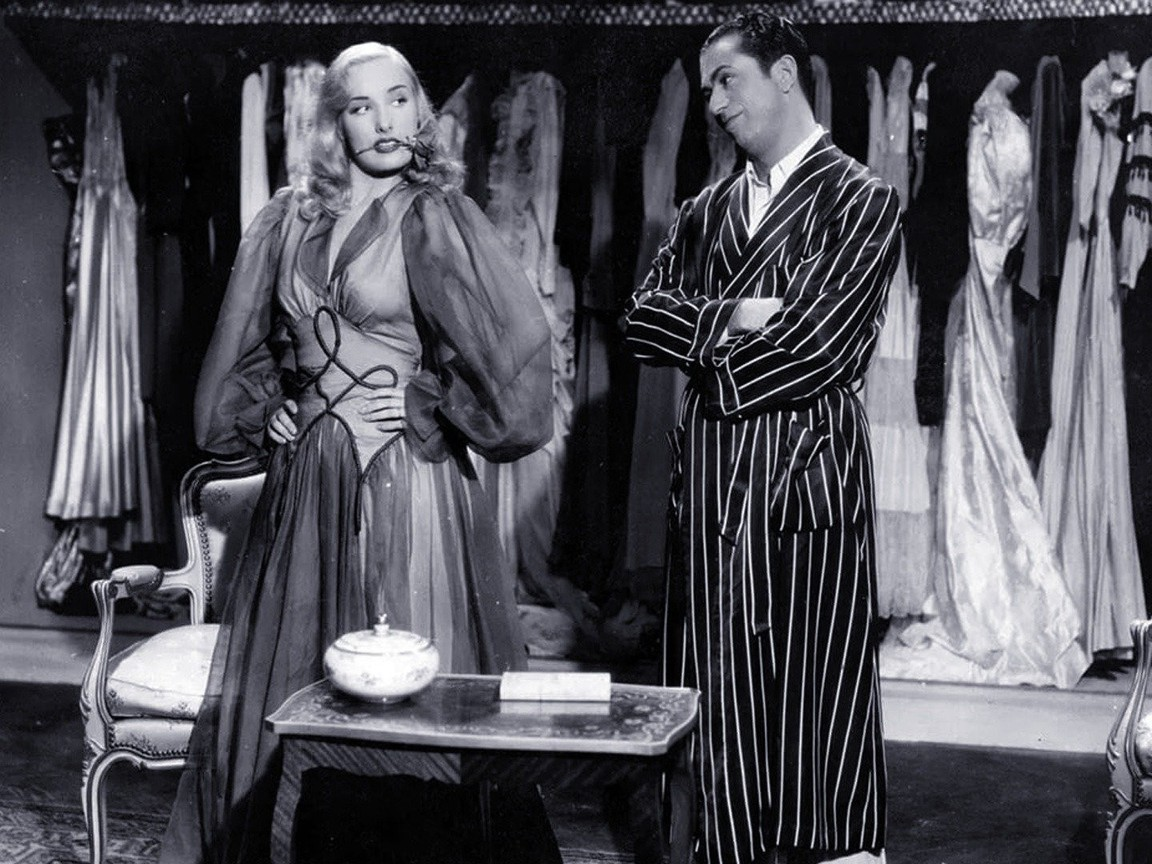
Mirtha Legrand and Juan Carlos Thorry in La señora de Pérez se divorcia (1945), directed by Carlos Hugo Christensen. Films like this overcame the ingénue model and opened the way to the more modern and cosmopolitan cine de fiesta.

The exhaustion of the comedia de ingenuas model around 1945 gave way to the second model of bourgeois comedy in Argentine cinema, the so-called cine de fiesta (literally "party cinema"), which was characterized by its celebration of urban life and focus on young, bourgeois couples who revel in leisure and entertainment while defying traditional social expectations. This subgenre signified a marked departure from the earlier cine de ingenuas, not only through its thematic content but also in its stylistic approach to filmmaking. The narrative and thematic elements of the cine de fiesta explicitly challenged the established norms of romantic love, the sanctity of monogamy, and the rigidity of social institutions. Instead, it celebrated a more liberated, joyful existence marked by the exuberance of youth and the excitement of modernity.

The directors Schlieper and Christensen were central to this genre. Their work captured a society in flux during the mid-20th century in Argentina—a time of significant social mobility, the rise of the middle class, and the political upheaval with the advent of Peronism in 1945.

This period was also marked by a surge in consumer culture and urban modernization, where comfort and access to entertainment became not just luxuries but necessities of a modern lifestyle. The cine de fiesta thus provided a cinematic mirror to these societal shifts, showcasing a world where the pursuit of pleasure and immediate gratification was celebrated. Initially, the genre was critiqued for its perceived superficiality or triviality. However, over time, there has been a reevaluation of the cine de fiesta's contribution to the evolution of comedy in Argentine cinema and connection to the screwball comedies of the United States, yet with unique influences from directors like Preston Sturges and Ernst Lubitsch. Some examples of party films include Christensen's Adán y la serpiente (1946) and Con el diablo en el cuerpo (1947), and Schlieper's Arroz con leche (1950), Cuando besa mi marido (1950), Esposa último modelo (1950) and Cosas de mujer (1951), all of them theatrical adaptations. At the same time, comedians such as Niní Marshall and Luis Sandrini sustained mass appeal with grotesque and popular humor, while Mirtha Legrand consolidated her screen persona in comedies directed by Daniel Tinayre and Luis César Amadori, which mixed genre conventions with touches of glamour and melodrama.

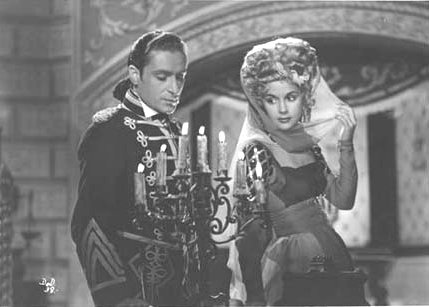
Enrique Diosdado and Delia Garcés in La dama duende (1945), directed by Luis Saslavsky, an example of the growing tendency of Argentine cinema to adapt foreign works.

As the 1940s progressed, the style of Argentine cinema became increasingly "internationalist" as a strategy to gain markets. This was reflected in an increasing interest in adapting foreign literary works, the disuse of Argentine Spanish and the elimination of other local or costumbrist references. Examples of this trend include Saraceni's Los tres mosqueteros (1946), Soffici's El pecado de Julia (1946), Schlieper's Madame Bovary (1947), and Saslavsky's Historia de una mala mujer (1948), among others. The purported elimination of Argentine identity that characterized the last stage of classical Argentine cinema was harshly evaluated by traditional Argentine historiography. Mahieu described the period as the "rise of the falsely international, hybrid cinema, the pink comedy, the hollow melodrama", although he commended the "isolated exceptions" of Pelota de trapo (1948), El crimen de Oribe (1950), Días de odio (1954) and Las aguas bajan turbias (1952). This "prestige cinema" was reinforced by star-centered melodramas. Zully Moreno, often directed by Amadori or Arancibia, became the archetypal diva in La mujer de las camelias (1953), La dama del mar (1954) or El barro humano (1955), where elaborate décor and tragic heroines displaced costumbrismo in favor of a cosmopolitan mise-en-scène. Laura Hidalgo offered a darker variant in El túnel (1952) and Armiño negro (1953), where existentialist overtones and fractured flashbacks revealed the cracks in classical narrative. The widespread use of flashback as a narrative device, fashionable both locally and internationally, fractured linearity and allowed more complex temporal structures, even if audiences sometimes complained of its overuse.

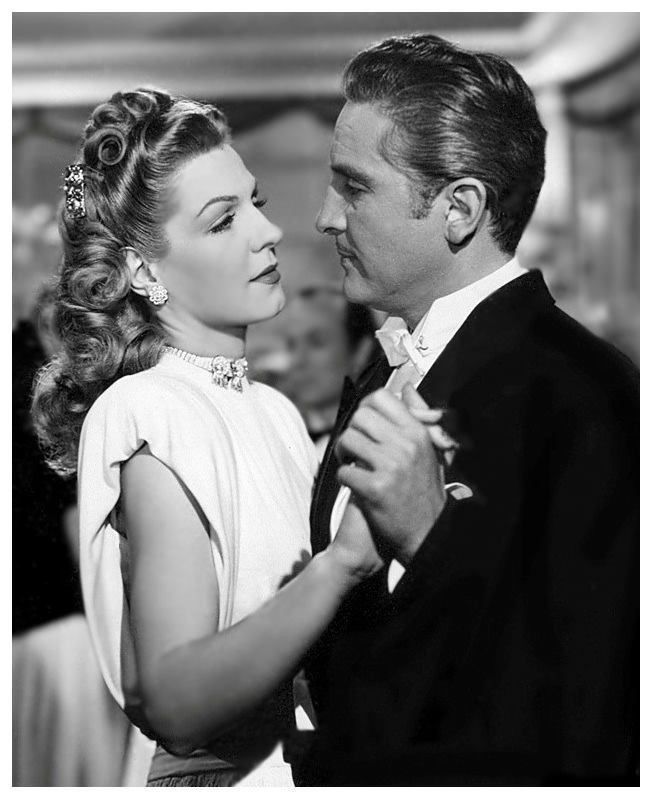
Zully Moreno and Arturo de Córdova in Dios se lo pague (1948), directed by Luis César Amadori.

During the Peronist era, Argentine cinema continued the comedic trends of the early 1940s, with films often reflecting elements of official discourse despite the absence of explicit propaganda. According to Clara Kriger, one of the greatest examples of this is the successful melodrama Dios se lo pague (1948), which, despite being labeled a typical "hybrid" film of the 1940s and early 1950s for its perceived lack of clear contextual grounding, embodies Peronism's emphasis on social reconciliation by portraying harmony between rich and poor, aligning with the movement's ideological rhetoric, while highlighting the centrality of public institutions like hospitals, reflecting the Peronist advocacy for state-driven social welfare. Additionally, the film's commercial logic capitalized on the prevailing Peronist discourse, incorporating characters like factory workers and working women in prominent roles, which echoed the social mobility and visibility of these groups under Perón's policies.

Unlike countries of the region like Mexico and Brazil, Argentina's cinematic engagement with state ideology was relatively late, emerging prominently under Perón. Globally, the era's cinema shared similarities with state-influenced filmmaking, such as American New Deal documentaries or British wartime propaganda, where governments leveraged film to communicate with citizens. However, Argentina's classical cinema stood out for its integration of Peronist themes into mainstream melodramas rather than relying solely on documentaries, blending entertainment with ideological messaging in a way that felt organic to audiences. The lack of archival records complicates understanding the production context of these films, as unlike studies of in the United States or Mexican films during Lázaro Cárdenas' rule, where detailed documentation exists, Argentina's Peronist-era archives were destroyed, leaving researchers to rely on the films themselves. Films such as Los isleros (1951) or Las aguas bajan turbias (1952) gave melodrama a socially committed dimension, linking collective labor and female sacrifice to Peronist values, while Mercado de Abasto (1955) turned a Buenos Aires market into a showcase of official anti-speculation discourse. These narratives often blended neorealist influence with heightened melodramatic codes, using chiaroscuro cinematography and voice-over to emphasize moral struggle.

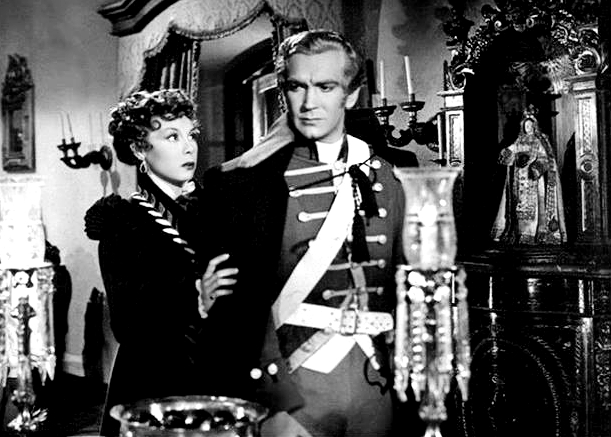
Fanny Navarro and Carlos Cores in the Mariquita Sánchez biopic El grito sagrado (1954), directed by Luis César Amadori. The film represents the heroine as a figure similar to Eva Perón, portrayed as a fighter for the poor and disadvantaged.

According to Valeria Manzano, the Peronist government supported "highly moral films, which exalted values such as solidarity, the maintenance of family unity, and patriotism, and pointed out binary oppositions that were typical of the Peronist public discourse, such as 'people-oligarchy' or 'luxury-austerity'." The emergence of the industrial nouveau riche was portrayed in contrast with old elites, often through parody, as seen in Carlos Schlieper's Esposa último modelo (1950). Manzano highlights the exaggerated style of these films: "Everything appears exaggerated, even ridiculed: exuberant costumes, overloaded sets, and the chaos that reigns in these new 'disordered' houses. (...) In this chaos, marital entanglements take place (...) the resolution of these conflicts leads to a rarely disguised moral: any 'male mischief' will be forgiven, as long as it does not endanger the security of the home."

Manzano also examines the comedies of Niní Marshall and Luis Sandrini, where "conflicts are resolved by tapping into a kind of 'popular common sense'." These films frequently depicted low-skilled workers striving for middle-class stability and highlighted the acceptance of class boundaries, like in Manuel Romero's Navidad de los pobres (1947), where "the class society of Peronism coexists (...) the classes share a code and a conflict, the relationships are friendly and pleasant, but the assigned places are never, ever subverted." Another recurring theme was a work ethic opposed to "corruption" and "idleness", exemplified by Pepe Arias' roles, where his character "usually begins by dreaming of being able to escape the harshness of work and takes on a thousand characters to achieve it." Sports dramas such as Escuela de campeones (1950) or El cura Lorenzo (1954) reinforced this ethos of discipline and sacrifice, while musical comedies starring Lolita Torres or Amelita Vargas integrated popular rhythms like tango, bolero and mambo into optimistic narratives of family, youth and nation. The cycle of "quickie" films by the Productora General Belgrano studio exploited radio and revue stars such as Pepe "El Zorro" Iglesias or Los Cinco Grandes del Buen Humor, demonstrating how comic parody and music offered escapist entertainment within the moral boundaries promoted by the regime.

The 1940s and 1950s marked the peak of Argentine noir, with directors like Carlos Hugo Christensen, Román Viñoly Barreto, Hugo Fregonese, Don Napy, Daniel Tinayre and Mario Soffici producing some of the era's most celebrated titles. Argentine cinema developed a distinctive form of film noir, shaped by both American and French influences while drawing on local cultural elements such as tango and popular literature. French critics coined the term film noir in the postwar era to describe 1940s American crime films which blurred the boundaries between good and evil and emphasized moral ambiguity, nocturnal atmospheres, and feelings of paranoia and fatalism. In Argentina, these traits appeared early on, with silent films like Bajo la mirada de Dios (1925) and the first sound-era crime successes such as Arturo S. Mom's Monte criollo (1935) and Palermo (1937), which merged crime plots with popular music and tango. Directors like Manuel Romero and Daniel Tinayre later expanded on this formula with films like Ven... mi corazón te llama (1942) and Vidas marcadas (1942), respectively, incorporating the archetype of the femme fatale. Christensen's No abras nunca esa puerta (1952) and Viñoly Barreto's La bestia debe morir (1952) showcased atmospheric visuals, psychological tension and morally complex characters. Meanwhile, Apenas un delincuente (1948) reflected Italian neorealist influences, while Los tallos amargos (1956) captured the essence of classic noir with its subjective narrative and bleak tone. The portrayal of law enforcement was often reverential due to political pressures, leading some filmmakers to create "police-less" noirs, as seen in Los tallos amargos. Complementary cycles like El vampiro negro (1953), Barrio gris (1954) or Deshonra (1952) broadened noir toward carceral melodrama and social tableaux of Buenos Aires' underworld, while adaptations from the Séptimo Círculo detective series underscored the period's interplay between literary prestige and pulp suspense. These films exploited chiaroscuro lighting, fractured temporality and grotesque villains such as Nathán Pinzón's child predator in El vampiro negro, pushing the classical codes toward darker, more disturbing registers.

== Historiography ==
=== 1959–1966: Foundational works ===
The first historiographic proposals on national cinema appeared in a very fragmentary manner and in specialized magazines shortly after the emergence of the Argentine film industry. In the mid-1940s, there was a publishing boom in the United States and Europe of books on film history, which ignored Latin American industries such as Argentina's, beyond a few brief mentions. An exception was the publication in 1944 of the Spanish version of The Cinema To-day by Douglas Arthur Spencer and Hubert D. Waley, whose translator Francisco Madrid included an epilogue focused on Argentina, becoming the earliest antecedent of the study of Argentine classical cinema.

The first proper book dedicated to the history of Argentine cinema was journalist Domingo Di Núbila's Historia del cine argentino, published between 1959 and 1960. Di Núbila's work emerged at a time in which the idea of writing the history of the different regional cinemas arose in Latin America, inspired by the growing publishing of books focused on the history and making of cinema in general. Around the same time, histories of national cinema were published in Brazil by Alex Viany and in Mexico by Emilio García Riera. These works were the first to deal with the history of cinema in the Latin American context, and it is fitting that they emerged in the only three countries that had managed to develop a local industry. In addition, García Riera's book on Mexican cinema had the novelty of being the first to historicize cinema from the Latin American academic framework.

Di Núbila's book—which introduced the concept of the "Golden Age"— became a foundational work and an unavoidable point of reference for Argentine film studies of the classical period, established concepts and assessments that were highly influential in the following decades, although questioned and reinterpreted from the late 20th century onwards. His book was published in a context of great uncertainty for local cinema, in which classical forms were disappearing and new modernizing forms were beginning to emerge. In this context, he advocated a less regulated industry that would be revitalized through the laws of supply and demand. In order to propose the new objectives that Argentine cinema should adopt in the following years, Di Núbila necessarily established a narrative of the past. His book revolves around a selection of releases that he distinguishes by their popularity, technical elements, or his own personal tastes. For Di Núbila, the problems of Argentine cinema revolved around four central elements: lack of investment to update technology, mismanagement of the business, an inadequate relationship between industry and state, and the weakening of authentically national themes and narrative forms. Another important element of Di Núbila's text is that it highlights national elements in local cinema, especially those linked to popular or urban traditions (such as tango), in order to demonstrate an independence with respect to film histories linked to traditional countries. Although it allowed to establish its own parameters to analyze Argentine cinema, this perspective had the counterpart of excluding it from comparisons with the cinema of other Latin American countries and the rest of the world.

In 1966, José Agustín Mahieu published Breve historia del cine argentino which, in addition to Di Núbila's book, became a foundational reference text for subsequent historical studies of Argentine classical cinema. Like Di Núbila, Mahieu proposed a history of Argentine cinema in evolutionary terms and with a focus on the opposition between the national and the foreign. Both authors gave special value to the films of the 1930s for their "authentically Argentine" themes and undervalued those of the 1940s for having fewer local references. In the case of Mahieu's work, there is a defense of the new cinema that was emerging in the 1960s, considering the classical-industrial period (in particular the 1940s) as a lower step and modern cinema as a final stage of maturity. This approach had a great impact and longevity in the historiography of Argentine and Latin American cinema.

=== 1969–1990: Modern criticism and minimization ===
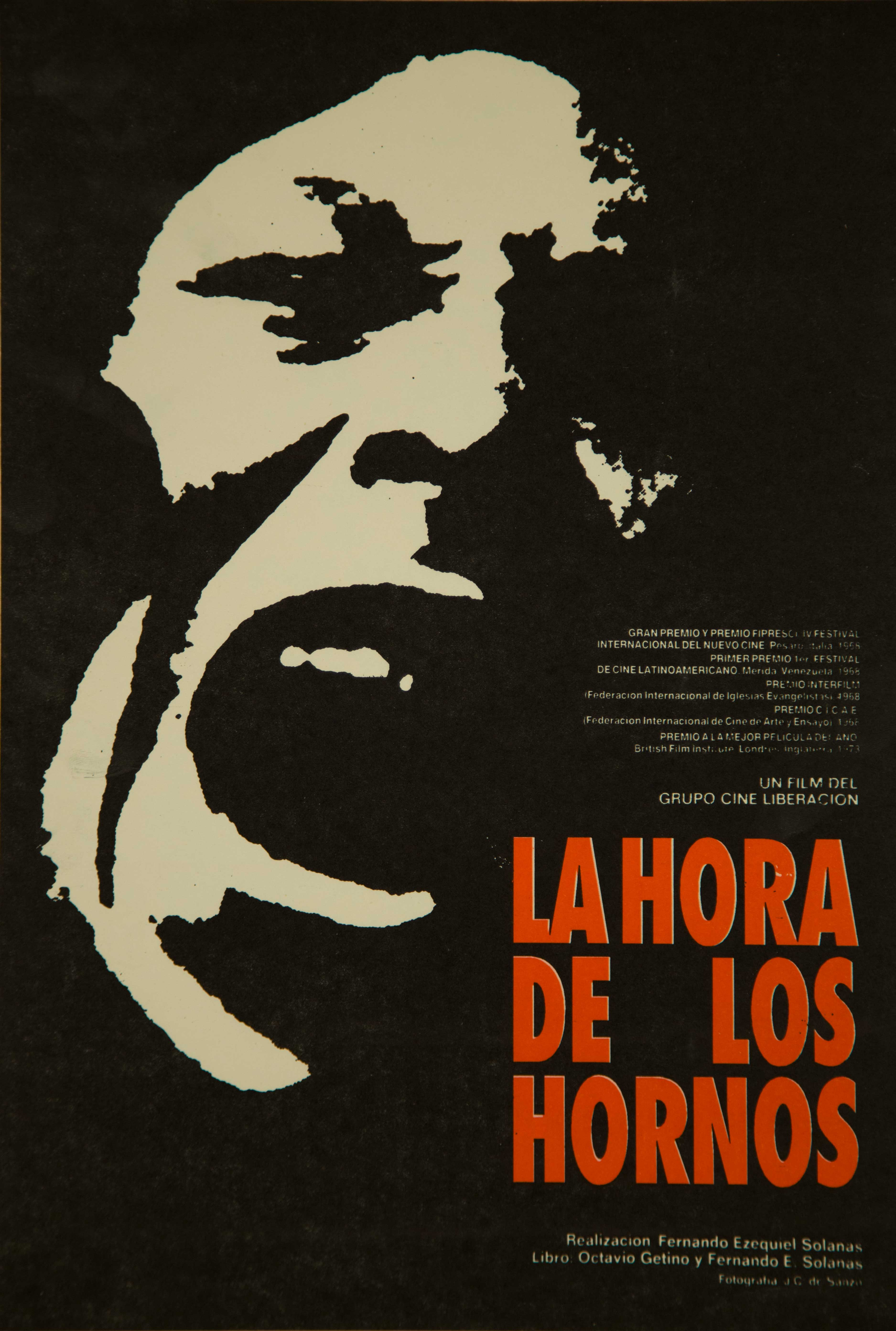
Poster for the political film La hora de los hornos (1968), directed by Octavio Getino and Fernando Solanas of Grupo Cine Liberación, a Third Cinema movement that openly rejected classical cinema and influenced the subsequent lack of interest of film historians in the period.

In 1969, the left-wing collective Grupo Cine Liberación, formed by Octavio Getino and Fernando "Pino" Solanas, elaborated its manifesto "Towards a Third Cinema", which strongly condemned classical-industrial films. In the 1970s, books were published by Estela Dos Santos (who again focused on the mimicry between classical Argentine cinema and Hollywood), Getino and Solanas (maintaining their views of the late 1960s), and Abel Posadas, who distanced himself from the positions of his time for his criticism of the validity of Di Núbila's work, the rescue of traditionally underrated films and directors of the classical period, and his opposition to leftist intellectuals.

In the 1980s, the historiography of Argentine cinema was renewed with the appearance of new works that broadened the analysis by focusing on Latin America as a whole, at a time when the conceptualization of Latin American cinema was in vogue, focused on the region's political cinema. As noted by Kriger, the texts that "had the greatest impact on the incipient group of Argentine scholars and researchers [were those which] based their hypotheses on the dependency theory—a consideration in terms of core-periphery of the functioning of the productive structures and of the aesthetic results obtained." The most important books of this trend were O cinema na América Latina (1985) by Paulo Antonio Paranaguá and Historia del cine latinoamericano (1987) by Peter Schumann. Although useful for the analysis of modern cinema, these approaches concentrated on the aspects in common in the cinema of the different countries of the region, giving very little presence to classical cinema. As noted by Soledad Pardo: "The position was very clear: in the face of a classical cinema considered conservative and heir to foreign forms that were always harmful, modern cinema burst in with its revolutionary and authentically Latin American vocation. The immediate consequence of the disqualification of [Argentine classical cinema] was the lack of interest and, therefore, the scarcity of exhaustive studies on it."

=== 1990–present: Renewal and growth ===
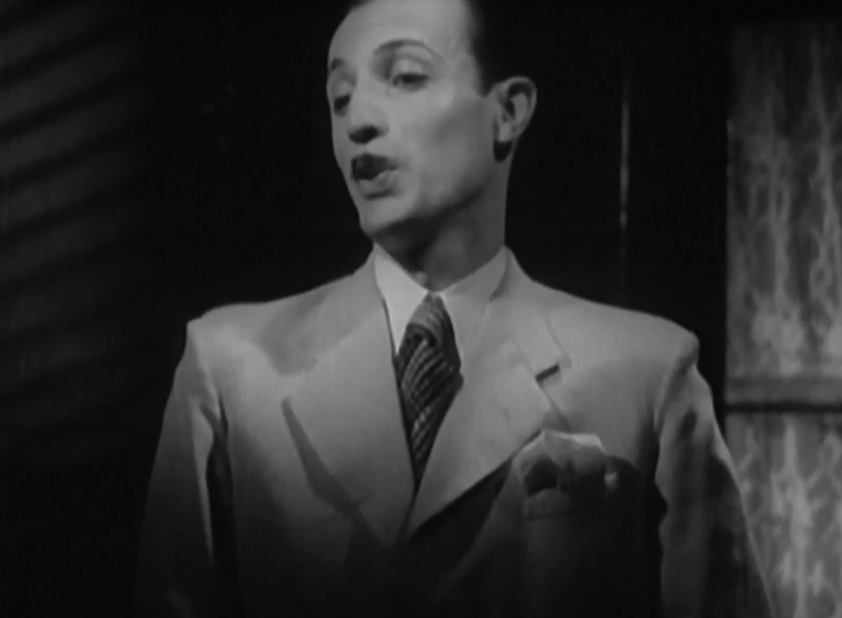
Homero Cárpena as Pocholo in Los tres berretines (1933), identified by film historian Adrián Melo as the first portrayal of a queer character in Argentine cinema. Research like Melo's were part of a renewal of Argentine film studies in the 2000s.

A turning point in classical Argentine film studies came in the 1990s, when much new scholarship on Argentine cinema began to appear, and although the classical period did not appear as the most studied, the texts still multiplied exponentially. These new texts avoided the stance of classical historiography, which viewed the history of Argentine cinema as a succession of notable films and events. They also introduced semiotic or structuralist tools to the analysis of films, which until then had been based on summarizing their plots. The publication in 1992 of the book Cine argentino. La otra historia, compiled by Sergio Wolf, was pivotal and inaugurated this new renovating stage, with texts deliberately questioning the traditional narratives of Argentine cinema. The studies from this period were characterized by not being all-encompassing but rather by focusing on specific themes selected based on different theoretical or methodological criteria. With the arrival of the 21st century came the publication of Cine argentino, industria y clasicismo (2000), a comprehensive two-volume work edited by Claudio España. This influential collective research delved deeply into the classical era of Argentine film production from 1933 to 1956.

Since the early 2000s, studies on classical Argentine cinema have undergone a significant transformation, as the longstanding disregard or indifference toward this era gave way to renewed interest from scholars who have approached it with an unprecedented level of theoretical and methodological rigor. These texts demonstrate different levels of focus on specific topics from the period, emphasizing the importance of introducing new questions and perspectives that were overlooked in traditional accounts, rather than simply rewriting the classical past. Examples include Horacio Campodónico's political-economic analysis (2005), Ana Laura Lusnich's study of the "social-folkloric drama" genre (2005), and Adrián Melo's research on LGBT representations in Argentine cinema (2009). The fields of cultural studies and transnational studies further enriched the exploration of classical Argentine cinema. In the realm of the former, Matthew B. Karush published a book in 2012 that examined classical Argentine cinema as part of the "mass cultural commodities", understanding the convergence of media industries as a phenomenon of meaning within the films themselves. Transnational studies, on the other hand, opened up new problems in the comparative study of the Argentine classical era with that of other countries, notably Mexico. Most recently, several historians identified with the New Cinema History movement—which analyzes cinema as a social phenomenon—have studied the audiences and filmgoing experiences of classical Argentine cinema, aspects until then unexplored by national film scholarship.

== Legacy ==
=== Conservation ===
"A combination of a total lack of knowledge about the best conditions for preserving the material and the high cost of preserving it led to a situation in which most of the Argentine cinema preserved to this day is preserved 'by chance'. The State never became truly aware of how important it is to preserve national cinema, as if indefinite production would replace the successive loss of material."

— Film historian Martín Miguel Pereira, 2015.

Due to a long history of neglect in the preservation of Argentine films, much of the country's classical era cinema is considered lost. It is estimated that half of Argentine sound films are lost, a figure that rises to 90% in the case of silent films. Unlike most countries, Argentina has not adopted public policies that preserve the national film heritage. This has led to the loss of a large amount of material and to the fact that of many films only a single copy survives in a poor condition, even some that are considered among the most important in Argentine cinema by critics and specialists. Many films survive but through incomplete copies, missing scenes, entire acts or musical numbers.

Between the late 1930s and mid-1940s, there were some measures for the conservation of film material, although they were interested in the documentary record rather than fiction films. In 1949, the nonprofit cinematheque Fundación Cinemateca Argentina was created as a result of the merging of two film clubs, with the objective of preserving and disseminating cinema. The relationship between the Fundación Cinemateca Argentina and the state and its financial support is complex and spans decades. In the early 1990s, the Argentine government subsidized the Fundación Cinemateca Argentina, funding the purchase of its current building in Constitución and acquiring around 400 national films from the U.S. to prevent their disposal due to the video boom. Further acquisitions of Argentine films abroad occurred between 1996 and 1997. Legal issues have kept around 300 films in the National Autonomous University of Mexico's cinematheque since 2002, unable to return. Senator Luis Falcó from Río Negro attempted in 2006 to legislate their duty-free import, but his proposal failed, and he died the following year. The initiative lapsed in 2008, leaving 700 Argentine films (of an estimated 3,000) still abroad.

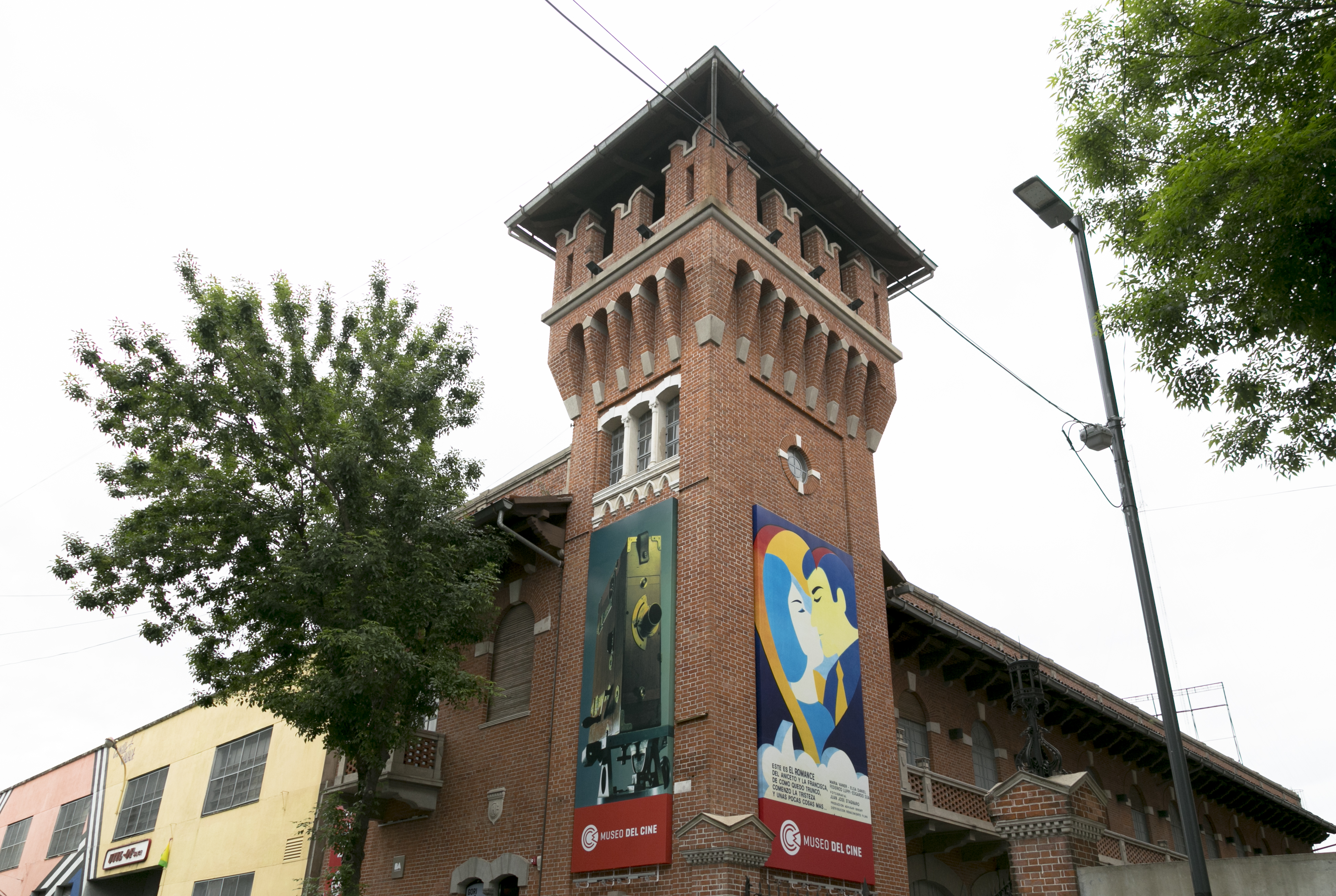
Established in 1971, the Museo del Cine Pablo Ducrós Hicken, dependent of the city of Buenos Aires, exhibits and preserves a large number of films and diverse materials from Argentine classical cinema.

The law that created the National Institute of Cinematography in 1957, decreed by the military government after the overthrow of Perón, provided for the creation of the National Cinematheque, where producers reportedly had to deliver a copy of every film made with credit or subsidy from the organization. Nevertheless, these film copies were of poor quality, either being the initial, worst "A copy" or ones heavily used in national screenings, representing the only surviving copies in most cases. Additionally, many have been lost overseas or through careless lending. In 1968, a new law established that films of special interest should be given a copy to the General Archive of the Nation, in addition to that of the new National Institute of Cinema and Audiovisual Arts (INCAA). The law also ordered the creation of a National Cinematheque dependent on the INCAA, which casts doubt as to whether what was stipulated in 1957 was ever fulfilled, and made its prerogatives explicit, making it perhaps the first action of the state in terms of film preservation. In addition, in 1971 the Museo del Cine Pablo Ducrós Hicken was created, which among its functions includes the conservation of a large film archive and is administered by the government of the city of Buenos Aires. Currently located in La Boca, the museum exhibits a large number of objects, artifacts and audiovisual material from the history of Argentine cinema, including the Golden Age. The abandoned Lumiton studios in Munro were rescued from demolition in the 1990s and converted into a museum run by the municipality of Vicente López, with a permanent collection of Lumiton's history, a screening room, and an extensive archive.

In the 1990s, Fernando "Pino" Solanas presented a national law for the creation of the Cinematheque and Archive of the National Image (Spanish: Cinemateca y Archivo de la Imagen Nacional, CINAIN), in order to unify all the scattered and poorly preserved national film heritage in a single place. After being approved by the National Congress and then vetoed by President Carlos Menem, the law was finally approved in 1999, although it was not regulated until 2010. Since then, no government has ensured that the CINAIN began to operate under the terms established by law or to fulfill the functions that correspond to it, and the demand for the need of a National Cinematheque continues to be reiterated by the country's film community. According to a study conducted by filmmaker Hernán Gaffet and film collectors Fernando Martín Peña and Octavio Fabiano, 50% of national sound films have been lost forever. In addition to the INCAA film archive (which is different from the CINAIN), the General Archive of the Nation and the Museo del Cine Pablo Ducrós Hicken, there are also films in other public organizations such as the Televisión Pública and the National Library; storage conditions vary by institution, but none prioritize preservation, restoration, and dissemination, often due to prohibitively high costs. There are also several private collections of various kinds, although they cannot afford the costs of their proper conservation. The most important of these collectors is Peña, who is also a popular film historian and communicator, individually undertaking the safeguarding of a large part of the surviving Argentine cinema at the same time that he continues the demand for a National Cinematheque.

=== Critics' lists ===
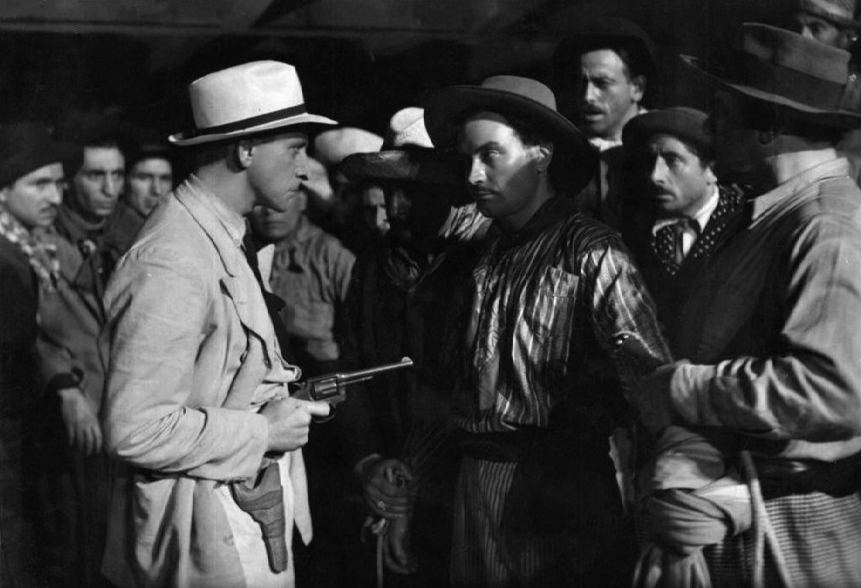
A film still of Prisioneros de la tierra (1939) by Mario Soffici, which has been considered the greatest Argentine film of all time on several occasions.

Several films from the classical period have been listed among the best in the history of Argentine cinema. The Museo del Cine Pablo Ducrós Hicken carried out polls to determine the greatest Argentine films of all time in the years 1977, 1984, 1991 and 2000. In the 1977 list, 8 of the top 10 results were films released before 1957, including Prisioneros de la tierra (1st place), La guerra gaucha (3rd place), Así es la vida (4th place), La vuelta al nido (5th place), Las aguas bajan turbias (6th place), La dama duende (7th place), Malambo (8th place) and Fuera de la ley (10th place). In the 1984 list, Prisioneros de la tierra was again selected as the greatest film of Argentine cinema, although only three other pre-1957 films reached the top 10: La guerra gaucha, Las aguas bajan turbias and Los isleros. Due to the coincidences in the number of votes, the top 100 list of the 2000 poll resulted in 43 positions comprising 101 films, of which 29 were released before 1957; these are:

- Las aguas bajan turbias (3rd place)
- Prisioneros de la tierra (6th place)
- La guerra gaucha (7th place)
- Apenas un delincuente (10th place)
- Los isleros (11th place)
- Dios se lo pague (14th place)
- Pelota de trapo (18th place)
- La vuelta al nido (24th place)
- Pampa bárbara (24th place)
- Los martes, orquídeas (27th place)
- Así es la vida (29th place)
- El crimen de Oribe (30th place)
- La fuga (32nd place)
- Kilómetro 111 (33rd place)
- El ángel desnudo (35th place)
- La muerte camina en la lluvia (35th place)
- Barrio gris (35th place)
- La dama duende (38th place)
- Viento norte (39th place)
- Su mejor alumno (39th place)
- El vampiro negro (39th place)
- Mercado de abasto (39th place)
- Si muero antes de despertar (40th place)
- No abras nunca esa puerta (41st place)
- Edad difícil (41st place)
- Más allá del olvido (41st place)
- Ayer fue primavera (42nd place)
- Historia de una noche (43rd place)
- Safo, historia de una pasión (43rd place)
- Donde mueren las palabras (43rd place)

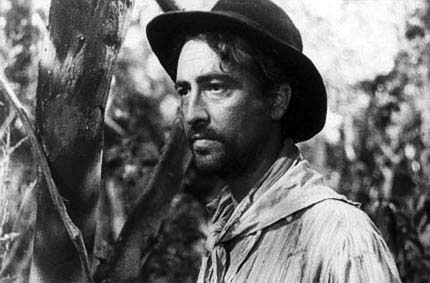
Hugo del Carril in a still of Las aguas bajan turbias (1952), the highest-rated classical-era film in a 2022 survey of the 100 greatest Argentine films of all time.

In 2022, the film magazines La vida útil, Taipei and La tierra quema carried out a new top 100 list inspired by the previous ones, which was presented at the Mar del Plata International Film Festival. Due to the coincidences in the number of votes, the total list includes 812 titles and 62 ranking positions, while the "top 100" includes places from 1 to 52 and comprises 103 films. For the first time, no pre-1960s film appeared in the top 10, and classical-era films were among those that decreased the most compared to the previous poll. The fact that more than a third of the list corresponds to films released in 2000 onwards has been interpreted as a consequence of the absence of conservation policies for the country's film heritage. As such, the results of the 2022 poll fueled the long-standing claim for the need for a national cinematheque. The films prior to 1957 that reached the top 100 of 2022 were:

- Las aguas bajan turbias (14th place)
- Más allá del olvido (18th place)
- Prisioneros de la tierra (19th place)
- Apenas un delincuente (27th place)
- Si muero antes de despertar (31st place)
- Los tallos amargos (42nd place)
- No abras nunca esa puerta (45th place)
- Mujeres que trabajan (49th place)
- La guerra gaucha (49th place)
- Los isleros (49th place)
- La vuelta al nido (51st place)
- Vidalita (51st place)
- La cabalgata del circo (52nd place)

In 2000, American Cinematographer—the magazine of the American Society of Cinematographers—listed Los tallos amargos (1956) as one of the "50 Best Photographed Films of All-Time", the work of cinematographer Ricardo Younis. In 2022, the Spanish magazine Fotogramas included Los tres berretines (1933), Los martes, orquídeas (1941) and Dios se lo pague (1948) in its list of the "20 best Argentine films in history". In the 2022 edition of Sight & Sound critics' poll, no Latin American film ranked among the top 100, and Argentine titles from the classical period only appear in individual critics' ballots, with the most-cited ones—each receiving two votes—being Mujeres que trabajan (1938), Prisioneros de la tierra (1939), Apenas un delincuente (1949), Las aguas bajan turbias (1952), Si muero antes de despertar (1952), Los tallos amargos (1956), and Más allá del olvido (1956).

== See also ==
- Golden Age of Mexican cinema
- Latin American cinema
- Lists of Argentine films

== Notes ==
=== Bibliography ===
- Berardi, Mario (2006). La vida imaginada: vida cotidiana y cine argentino (in Spanish). Buenos Aires: Ediciones del Jilguero. ISBN 987-9416-09-0 – via the Internet Archive.
- Di Núbila, Domingo (1998). La época de oro. Historia del cine argentino I (in Spanish). Buenos Aires: Ediciones del Jilguero. ISBN 978-987-957-865-0.
- España, Claudio (1999). "La cinematografía argentina (1896-1945)". Historia general del arte en la Argentina. Tomo VIII (PDF) (in Spanish). Buenos Aires: Academia Nacional de Bellas Artes. pp. 199–254. ISBN 950-612-041-2. Archived (PDF) from the original on 20 May 2026.
- España, Claudio, ed. (2000). Cine argentino: industria y clasicismo, 1933–1956 (in Spanish). Vol. 1. Buenos Aires: Fondo Nacional de las Artes. ISBN 978-950-980-759-4.
- España, Claudio (2005). "El cine argentino, 1945-1965: del clasicismo a la modernidad". Historia general del arte en la Argentina. Tomo X (PDF) (in Spanish). Buenos Aires: Academia Nacional de Bellas Artes. pp. 17–94. ISBN 950-612-005-6. Archived (PDF) from the original on 28 September 2025.
- Feldman, Simón (1990). La generación del 60 (PDF) (in Spanish). Buenos Aires: Instituto Nacional de Cinematografía; Ediciones Culturales Argentinas; Editorial Legasa.
- Finkielman, Jorge (2004). The Film Industry in Argentina: An Illustrated Cultural History. McFarland & Company, Inc. ISBN 978-078-641-628-8 – via the Internet Archive.
- Getino, Octavio (2005). Cine argentino: entre lo posible y lo deseable (in Spanish). Buenos Aires: Ediciones CICCUS. ISBN 978-987-935-524-4 – via Red de Historia de los Medios (ReHiMe) on Issuu.
- Karush, Matthew B. (2012). Culture of Class: Radio and Cinema in the Making of a Divided Argentina, 1920–1946. Duke University Press. ISBN 978-082-235-264-8 – via Google Books.
- Kriger, Clara, ed. (2018). Imágenes y públicos del cine argentino clásico (PDF) (in Spanish). Tandil: Universidad Nacional del Centro de la Provincia de Buenos Aires. ISBN 978-950-658-454-2.
- Lusnich, Ana Laura (2007). El drama social folclórico. El universo rural en el cine argentino (in Spanish). Prologue by Claudio España. Buenos Aires: Editorial Biblos. ISBN 978-950-786-613-5 – via the Internet Archive.
- Mahieu, José Agustín (1966). Breve historia del cine argentino (in Spanish). Buenos Aires: Editorial Universitaria de Buenos Aires.
- Manetti, Ricardo; Rodríguez Riva, Lucía, eds. (2014). 30-50-70. Conformación, crisis y renovación del cine industrial argentino y latinoamericano (PDF) (in Spanish). Buenos Aires: Editorial de la Facultad de Filosofía y Letras. Universidad de Buenos Aires. ISBN 978-987-361-714-0.
- Maranghello, César (2005). Breve historia del cine argentino (in Spanish). Buenos Aires: Laertes. ISBN 978-847-584-532-6.
- Peña, Fernando Martín (2012). Cien años de cine argentino (eBook) (in Spanish). Buenos Aires: Editorial Biblos. ISBN 978-987-691-098-9.
- Peña, Fernando Martín, ed. (2024). Cine argentino: hechos, gente, películas. 1896–1958 (in Spanish). Buenos Aires: Luz Fernández Ediciones. ISBN 978-631-00-4792-8.
- Rist, Peter H. (2014). Historical Dictionary of South American Cinema. Rowman & Littlefield. ISBN 978-081-088-036-8 – via Google Books.
- Schumann, Peter B. (1987). Historia del cine latinoamericano (in Spanish). Buenos Aires: Legasa. ISBN 978-950-600-099-8.
