= List of Argentine films before 1930 =

A list of earliest films produced in Argentina between 1897 and 1929 ordered by year of release. For an A-Z list of Argentine films see Category:Argentine films

== Pre 1910 ==
Year	Title	Director	Actors	Genre	Notability
1897	La bandera Argentina	Eugene Py		Short	
1900	Tango argentino	Eugene Py		Musical, Short	
1901	Bohemia criolla	Eugene Py		Short	
1901	El Calotero	Eugene Py		Short	
1901	En casa del fotógrafo	Eugene Py		Comedy, Short	
1901	La Revista de la Escuadra Argentina	Eugene Py		Short	
1903	Pica, pica compadrito	Eugene Py		Short	
1904	Abajo la careta	Eugene Py		Short	
1904	Los Políticos	Eugene Py		Short	
1905	Ensalada criolla	Eugene Py		Short	
1906	El Soldado de la Independencia	Eugene Py		Short	
1906	Gabino, el Mayora	Eugene Py		Short	
1906	El Pechador'	Eugene Py		Short	
1907	Dejá é jugar, ché, ché	Eugene Py		Short	
1907	Los Tocayos	Eugene Py		Short	
1907	Dejá é jugar, ché, ché	Eugene Py		Short	
1907	Mister Wiskey	Eugene Py		Short	
1907	El Satario			Stag	
1908	Los Carreros	Eugene Py		Drama, Short	
1908	El fusilamiento de Dorrego	Mario Gallo		Historical	
1909	Avelino Viamonte	Eugene Py		Short	
1909	Cochero de tranvía	Eugene Py		Short	
1909	La Beata	Eugene Py		Short	

== 1910s ==
Year	Title	Director	Actors	Genre	Notability
1910	Justicia criolla	Eugene Py		Short	
1910	La Trilla	Eugene Py	Eugene Py		
1910	La Revista cielo centenario	Eugene Py		Short	
1910	La Revolución de Mayo	Eugene Py		Historical	
1911	Los Escruchantes	Eugene Py		Sainete	
1914	Amalia	Eugene Py		Historical drama	
1915	Nobleza gaucha			Western	
1916	Hasta después de muerta		Florencio Parravicini	Drama	
1917	El Apóstol	Quirino Cristiani		Animation; First ever animation feature	November 9
1917	Federación o muerte			Historical Drama	
1917	Santos Vega	Carlos de Paoli		Western	
1918	En un día de gloria	Mario Gallo and Alberto Traversa			
1918	Sin dejar rastros	Quirino Cristiani		Political satire	
1918	Buenos Aires tenebroso	Juan Glize		Drama	
1918	La garra porteña	Juan Glize			
1918	Violeta o La reina del tango	Juan Glize		Drama	
1919	En buena ley			Drama	
1919	Campo ajuera			Drama	
1919	Juan Sin Ropa	Georges Benoît	Camila Quiroga	Social melodrama	

== 1920s ==
Year	Title	Director	Actors	Genre	Notability
1920	Palomas rubias	José A. Ferreyra	María Clais	Romantic comody	
1920	La Gaucha	José A. Ferreyra		Western	
1922	La Muchacha del arrabal	José A. Ferreyra		Drama	
1922	Buenos Aires, ciudad de ensueño	José A. Ferreyra		Musical	
1922	La Chica de la calle Florida	José A. Ferreyra		Romance	
1922	En un pingo pagaré				
1923	Galleguita			Drama	
1923	El guapo del arrabal			Comedy	
1923	De nuestras pampas			Drama	
1923	Corazón de criolla	José A. Ferreyra		Drama	
1923	Escándalo de medianoche			Drama	
1923	Firpo-Dempsey			Animated short	
1923	La Maleva	José A. Ferreyra		Drama	
1923	Legend of the Inca Bridge	José A. Ferreyra		Drama	
1923	Melenita de oro	José A. Ferreyra		Drama	
1924	Los Misterios del turf argentino			Drama	
1924	Buenos Aires bohemio			Musical	
1924	El Consultorio de Madame René		Ada Cornaro	Drama	Debut of Ada Cornaro
1924	Mientras Buenos Aires duerme	José A. Ferreyra		Drama	
1924	Odio serrano	José A. Ferreyra			
1925	Tu cuna fue un conventillo			Sainete	
1925	Padre nuestro			Drama	
1926	La Vuelta al Bulín			Comedy	
1927	Federales y unitarios			Drama	
1927	Perdón, viejita	José A. Ferreyra		Drama	
1928	Alma en pena	Julio Irigoyen		Drama	
1928	La Borrachera del tango			Drama	
1928	The Charge of the Gauchos	Albert H. Kelley	Francis X. Bushman, Jacqueline Logan	Historical	Co-production with the United States
1929	Destinos			Drama	
1929	Corazón ante la ley			Drama	
