= List of melodrama films =

This is a chronological list of melodrama films. Although melodrama can be found in film since its beginnings, it was not identified as a particular genre by film scholars—with its own formal and thematic features—until the 1970s and 1980s, at a time when new methodological approaches within film studies were being adopted, which placed greater emphasis on ideology, gender, and psychoanalysis. Much like film noir, melodrama was identified as a particular genre by film historians, and critics and theorists long after the films themselves had been made. However, unlike film noir, the term "melodrama" was widely used in Hollywood prior to its adoption by critics and historians, although with a very different meaning, as it referred to fast-paced action thrillers featuring violence and dangerous stunts. The definition of melodrama as a particular film genre—which emerged within film studies in the early 1970s—was eventually widely accepted by Hollywood filmmakers, reviewers, and journalists.

The academic interest in melodrama arose from a 1970s critical reappraisal of the work of Douglas Sirk, and the term evolved into a "broad category of cinema, one that often deals with highly-charged emotional issues, characterised by an extravagantly dramatic register and frequently by an overtly emotional mode of address." Despite its popularity, the exact definition of melodrama has been the subject of extensive and complex debates, and the term functions as an umbrella term that hybridises several film cycles and sub-genres, including romantic dramas, costume dramas, psychological thrillers, gothic films, domestic dramas, juvenile delinquency films, and crime films, among others. Some scholars have equated melodrama with the category of "woman's films", while others have used the term to refer to specific sub-genres, such as "family melodrama" or "maternal melodrama". As noted by John Mercer and Martin Shingler, the term "can be (and has been) applied to a large and diverse body of film spanning virtually every decade of filmmaking history and to different continents and cultures: American, European (for example, Gainsborough Melodrama) and Eastern (as with Hindi cinema)." To minimize dispute, the films included in this list should preferably be referenced with a reliable, published source by an expert in this field.

== 1900s–1910s ==
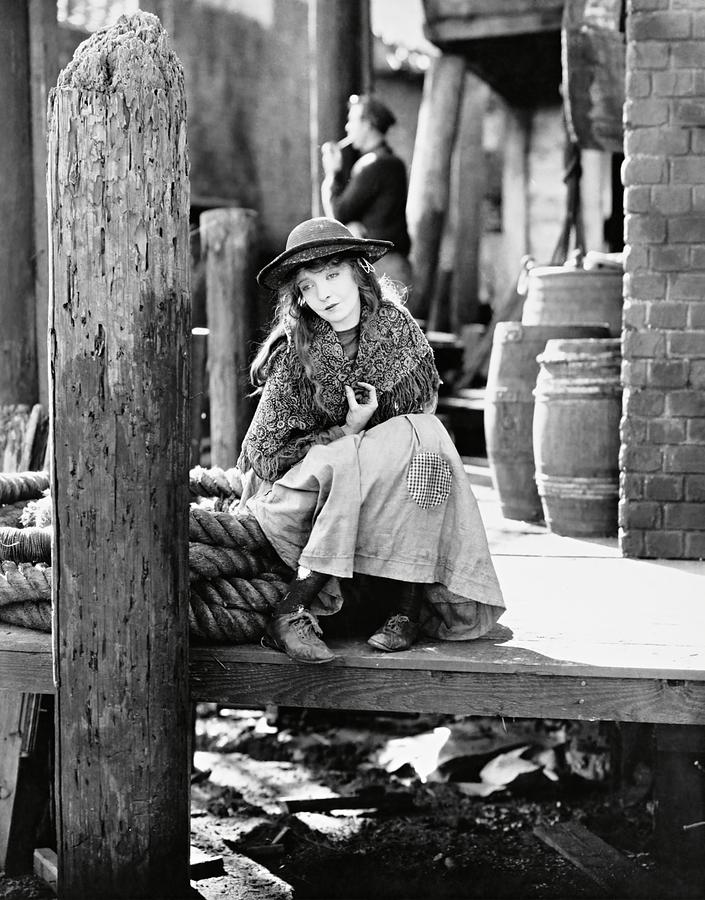
Lillian Gish in D. W. Griffith's Broken Blossoms (1919).

- The Death Disc: A Story of the Cromwellian Period (1909)
- The Battle (1911)
- The Lonedale Operator (1911)
- The Massacre (1912)
- The Mothering Heart (1913)
- The Birth of a Nation (1915)
- Alsace (1916)
- Flower of Paris (1916)
- The Gold Chignon (1916)
- Hasta después de muerta (1916)
- Intolerance (1916)
- O Guarani (1916)
- Le droit à la vie (1917)
- Mères françaises (1917)
- La Proie (1917)
- El tango de la muerte (1917)
- The Torture of Silence (1917)
- Hearts of the World (1918)
- La Route du devoir (1918)
- Broken Blossoms (1919)
- Juan Sin Ropa (1919)
- True Heart Susie (1919)

== 1920s ==
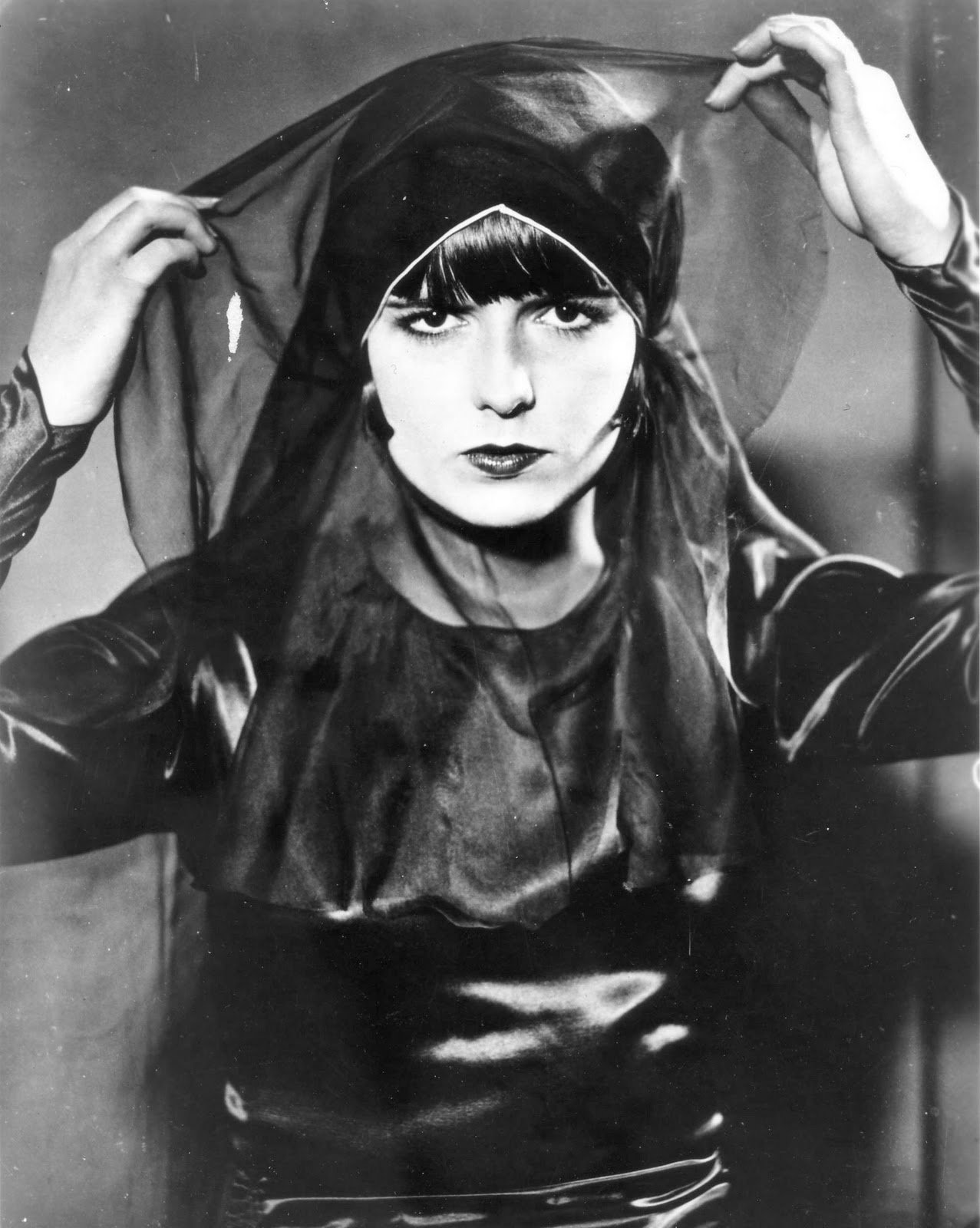
Louise Brooks in G. W. Pabst's Pandora's Box (1920).

- Madame X (1920)
- Way Down East (1920)
- The Blot (1921)
- The Four Horsemen of the Apocalypse (1921)
- Orphans of the Storm (1921)
- The Phantom Carriage (1921)
- The Sheik (1921)
- Foolish Wives (1922)
- Milonguita (1922)
- La muchacha del arrabal (1922)
- Melenita de oro (1923)
- Greed (1924)
- So Big (1924)
- The Big Parade (1925)
- The Goose Woman (1925)
- El húsar de la muerte (1925)
- Mi último tango (1925)
- My Son (1925)
- El organito de la tarde (1925)
- Smouldering Fires (1925)
- Stella Dallas (1925)
- La costurerita que dio aquel mal paso (1926)
- Dancing Mothers (1926)
- 7th Heaven (1927)
- Antoinette Sabrier (1927)
- The Lodger: A Story of the London Fog (1927)
- Love (1927)
- Perdón, viejita (1927)
- Sunrise: A Song of Two Humans (1927)
- The Crowd (1928)
- The Wind (1928)
- Destinos (1929)
- Diary of a Lost Girl (1929)
- Madame X (1929)
- Pandora's Box (1929)

== 1930s ==
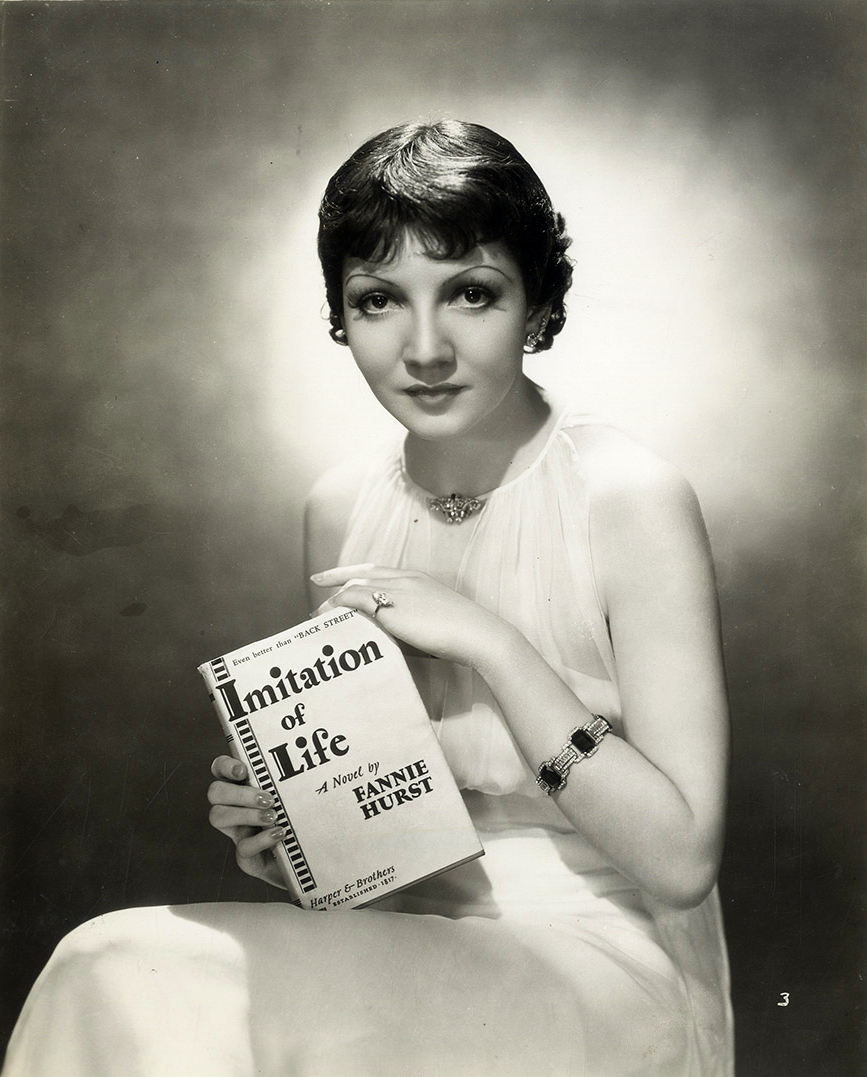
Claudette Colbert in John M. Stahl's Imitation of Life (1934).

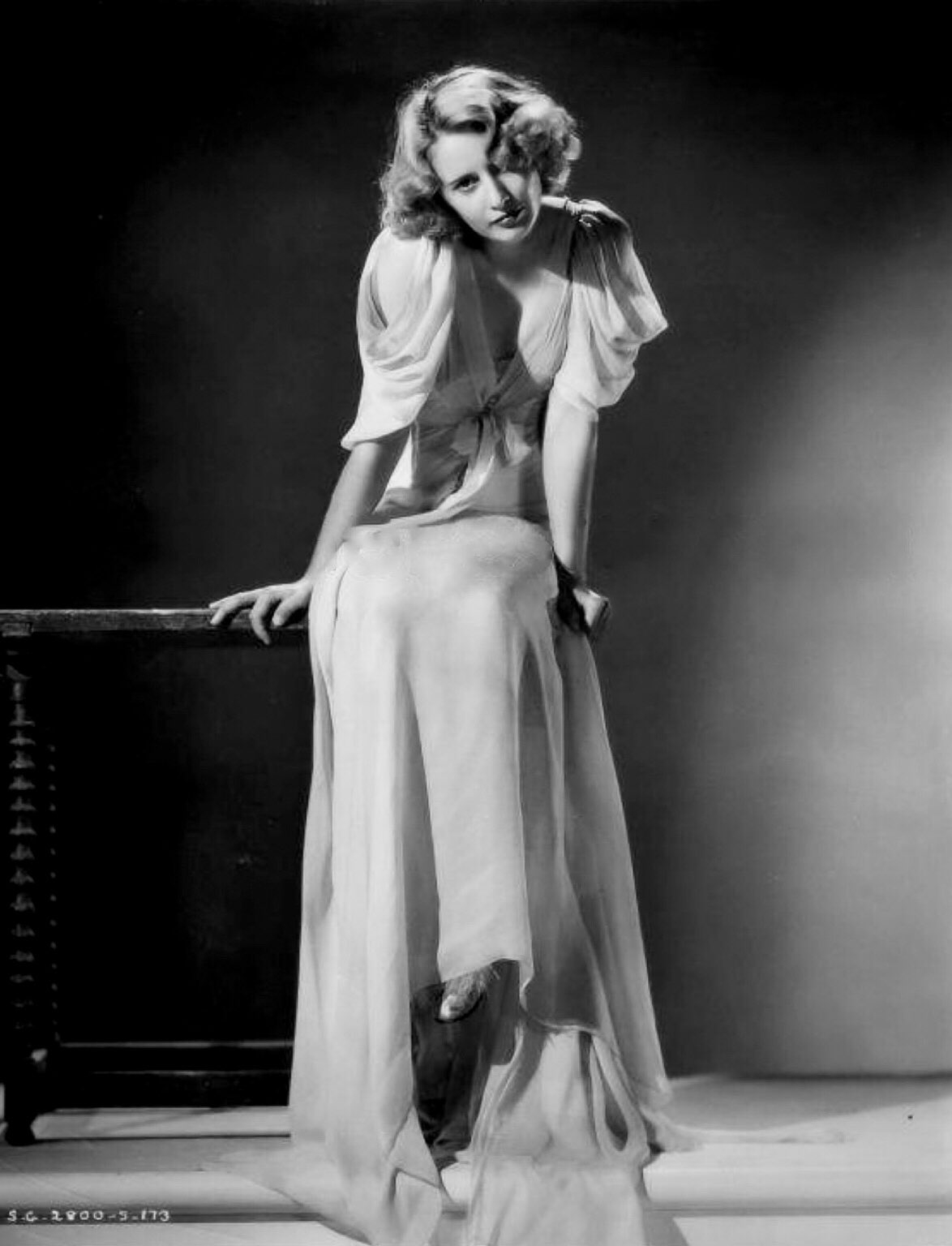
Barbara Stanwyck in King Vidor's Stella Dallas (1937).

- Common Clay (1930)
- Sarah and Son (1930)
- Wara Wara (1930)
- Born to Love (1931)
- City Lights (1931)
- East Lynne (1931)
- Muñequitas porteñas (1931)
- The Public Enemy (1931)
- The Sin of Madelon Claudet (1931)
- Back Street (1932)
- Blonde Venus (1932)
- Call Her Savage (1932)
- A Farewell to Arms (1932)
- Forbidden (1932)
- Christopher Strong (1933)
- House on 56th Street (1933)
- Jennie Gerhardt (1933)
- Man's Castle (1933)
- Only Yesterday (1933)
- El prisionero trece (1933)
- The Secret of Madame Blanche (1933)
- Ayer y hoy (1934)
- Calles de Buenos Aires (1934)
- El compadre Mendoza (1934)
- Gallant Lady (1934)
- Imitation of Life (1934)
- The Life of Vergie Winters (1934)
- La mujer del puerto (1934)
- No Greater Glory (1934)
- El alma del bandoneón (1935)
- Anna Karenina (1935)
- I Found Stella Parish (1935)
- Magnificent Obsession (1935)
- Monte criollo (1935)
- Pension Mimosas (1935)
- Puente Alsina (1935)
- Ayúdame a vivir (1936)
- Camille (1936)
- Osaka Elegy (1936)
- Private Number (1936)
- Sombras porteñas (1936)
- ¡Vámonos con Pancho Villa! (1936)
- Besos brujos (1937)
- Confession (1937)
- Conquest (1937)
- History Is Made at Night (1937)
- Lady Killer (1937)
- Madame X (1937)
- Marked Woman (1937)
- Palermo (1937)
- Stella Dallas (1937)
- Always Goodbye (1938)
- Comet Over Broadway (1938)
- Jezebel (1938)
- La ley que olvidaron (1938)
- Madreselva (1938)
- Dark Victory (1939)
- Drums Along the Mohawk (1939)
- Gone with the Wind (1939)
- The Old Maid (1939)
- The Private Lives of Elizabeth and Essex (1939)
- Puerta cerrada (1939)
- There's No Tomorrow (1939)
- Stagecoach(1939)
- When Tomorrow Comes (1939)
- Wuthering Heights (1939)

== 1940s ==
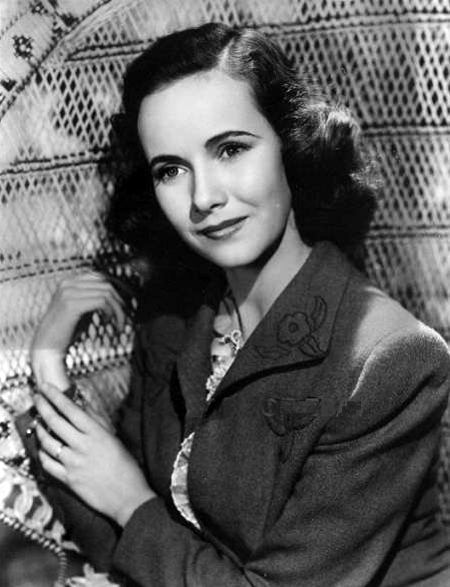
Teresa Wright in William Wyler's Mrs. Miniver (1942).

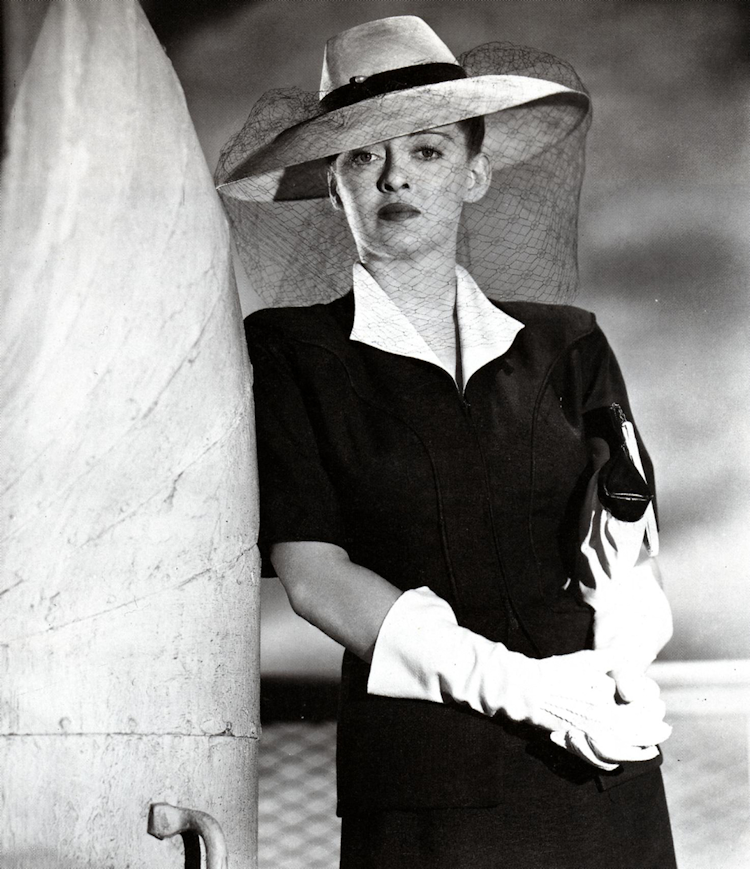
Bette Davis in Irving Rapper's Now, Voyager (1942).

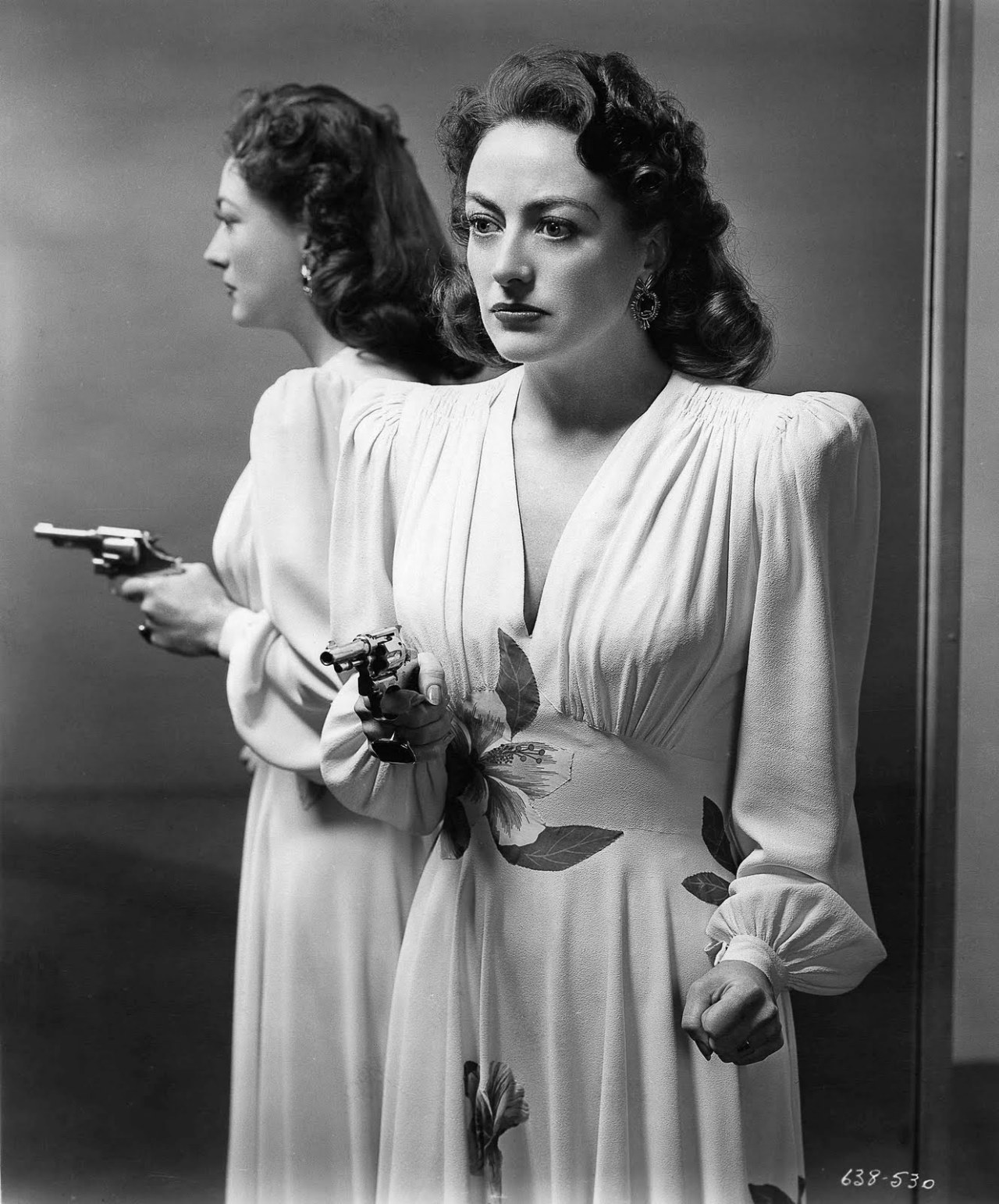
Joan Crawford in Michael Curtiz's Mildred Pierce (1945).

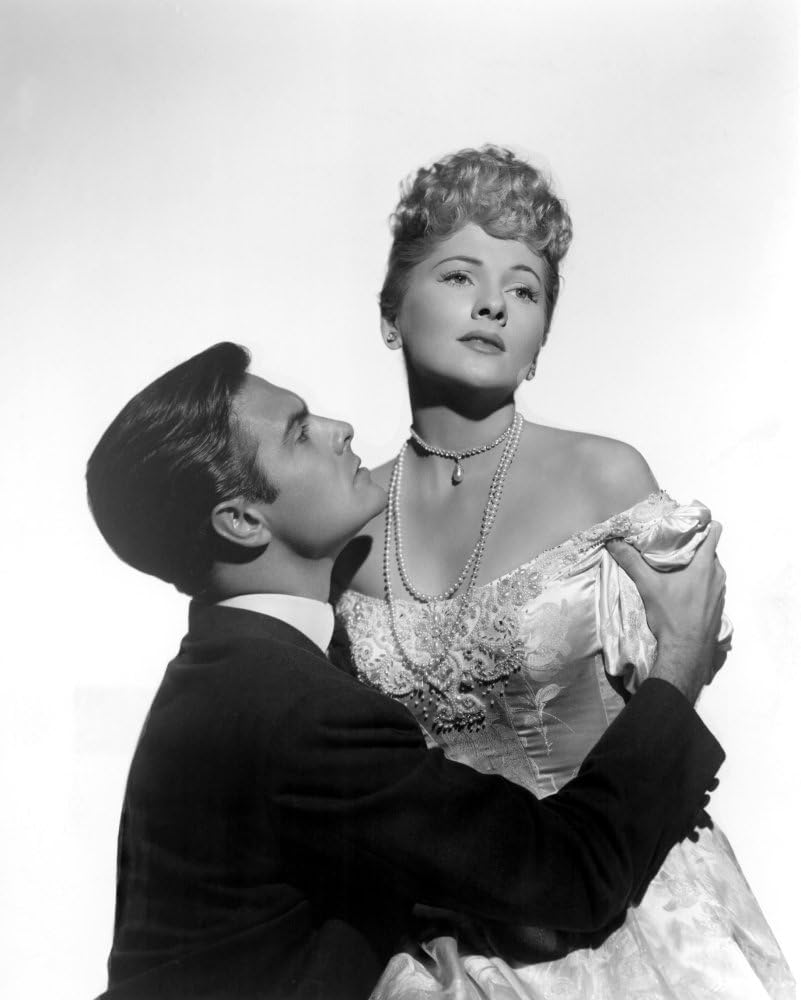
Louis Jourdan and Joan Fontaine in Max Ophüls' Letter from an Unknown Woman (1948).

- All This, and Heaven Too (1940)
- The Eternal Jew (1940)
- Jud Süß (1940)
- Kitty Foyle (1940)
- Paradise Lost (1940)
- The Thief of Bagdad (1940)
- Waterloo Bridge (1940)
- Citizen Kane (1941)
- That Hamilton Woman (1941)
- The Little Foxes (1941)
- Penny Serenade (1940)
- Casablanca (1942)
- Concierto de almas (1942)
- Hatter's Castle (1942)
- In Which We Serve (1942)
- Kings Row (1942)
- La guerra gaucha (1942)
- Mrs. Miniver (1942)
- Now, Voyager (1942)
- Random Harvest (1942)
- Yo conocí a esa mujer (1942)
- Doña Bárbara (1943)
- Jane Eyre (1943)
- Konga roja (1943)
- The Man in Grey (1943)
- María Candelaria (1943)
- Millions Like Us (1943)
- Safo, historia de una pasión (1943)
- Watch on the Rhine (1943)
- El deseo (1944)
- Double Indemnity (1944)
- Fanny by Gaslight (1944)
- Gaslight (1944)
- Laura (1944)
- Love Story (1944)
- Meet Me in St. Louis (1944)
- Romance proibido (1944)
- Since You Went Away (1944)
- Summer Storm (1944)
- This Happy Breed (1944)
- Las abandonadas (1945)
- Brief Encounter (1945)
- The Clock (1945)
- Les Dames du Bois de Boulogne (1945)
- Detour (1945)
- Fallen Angel (1945)
- I Know Where I'm Going! (1945)
- Kolberg (1945)
- Leave Her to Heaven (1945)
- Madonna of the Seven Moons (1945)
- Mildred Pierce (1945)
- Spellbound (1945)
- They Were Sisters (1945)
- The Wicked Lady (1945)
- The Best Years of Our Lives (1946)
- The Big Sleep (1946)
- Caravan (1946)
- Camino del infierno (1946)
- The Dark Mirror (1946)
- Deadline at Dawn (1946)
- Deception (1946)
- Donde mueren las palabras (1946)
- Duel in the Sun (1946)
- O ébrio (1946)
- Enamorada (1946)
- Gilda (1946)
- Great Expectations (1946)
- La honra de los hombres (1946)
- Humoresque (1946)
- It's a Wonderful Life (1946)
- Lauracha (1946)
- The Postman Always Rings Twice (1946)
- The Strange Love of Martha Ivers (1946)
- To Each His Own (1946)
- Undercurrent (1946)
- Black Narcissus (1947)
- Como tú lo soñaste (1947)
- Crossfire (1947)
- La diosa arrodillada (1947)
- Daisy Kenyon (1947)
- Estrellita (1947)
- It Always Rains on Sunday (1947)
- Jassy (1947)
- Madame Bovary (1947)
- Mirad los lirios del campo (1947)
- Nunca te diré adiós (1947)
- Out of the Past (1947)
- Possessed (1947)
- Dios se lo pague (1948)
- Force of Evil (1948)
- Johnny Belinda (1948)
- Inconfidência Mineira (1948)
- Letter from an Unknown Woman (1948)
- They Live by Night (1948)
- Mr. Perrin and Mr. Traill (1948)
- Oliver Twist (1948)
- Pasaporte a Río (1948)
- The Red Shoes (1948)
- Río escondido (1948)
- The Small Voice (1948)
- Sorry, Wrong Number (1948)
- Women of the Night (1948)
- Act of Violence (1949)
- All the King's Men (1949)
- The Bad Lord Byron (1949)
- Beyond the Forest (1949)
- Bitter Rice (1949)
- Caught (1949)
- The Heiress (1949)
- Madame Bovary (1949)
- My Home Village (1949)
- La malquerida (1949)
- My Foolish Heart (1949)
- Pueblerina (1949)
- The Reckless Moment (1949)
- The Set-Up (1949)
- Shockproof (1949)
- The Third Man (1949)
- The Window

== 1950s ==
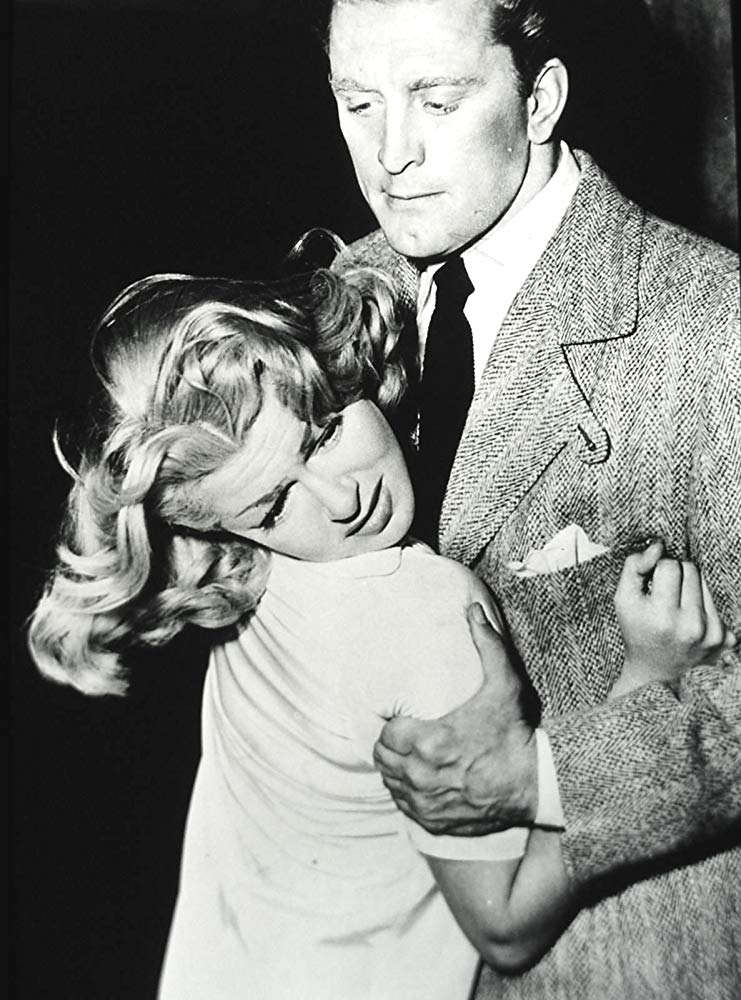
Lana Turner and Kirk Douglas in Vincente Minnelli's The Bad and the Beautiful (1952).

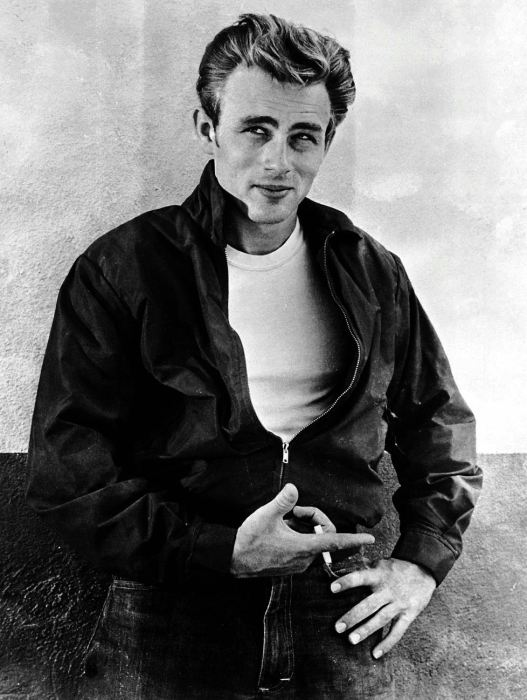
James Dean in Nicholas Ray's Rebel Without a Cause (1955).

Rock Hudson and Lauren Bacall in Douglas Sirk's Written on the Wind (1956).

- Aventurera (1950)
- La balandra Isabel llegó esta tarde (1950)
- The Blue Lamp (1950)
- The Bread Peddler (1950)
- Caiçara (1950)
- Doña diabla (1950)
- Gone to Earth (1950)
- Prelude to Fame (1950)
- Rashomon (1950)
- Seven Days to Noon (1950)
- Sunset Boulevard (1950)
- Wedding Ring (1950)
- Nobody's Children (1951)
- A Place in the Sun (1951)
- Pool of London (1951)
- Sensualidad (1951)
- A Streetcar Named Desire (1951)
- Thunder on the Hill (1951)
- The Ungrateful Heart (1951)
- Víctimas del pecado (1951)
- The Bad and the Beautiful (1952)
- Come Back, Little Sheba (1952)
- I figli non si vendono (1952)
- Mandy (1952)
- Rancho Notorious (1952)
- Ruby Gentry (1952)
- Tico-Tico no fubá (1952)
- All I Desire (1953)
- Ansiedad (1953)
- Armiño negro (1953)
- O cangaceiro (1953)
- The Drunkard (1953)
- The Earrings of Madame de... (1953)
- From Here to Eternity (1953)
- An Inlet of Muddy Water (1953)
- A Japanese Tragedy (1953)
- Shane (1953)
- Vuelve Sebastiana (1953)
- The Wild Geese (1953)
- Abismos de pasión (1954)
- Camelia (1954)
- The Country Girl (1954)
- Floradas na serra (1954)
- Johnny Guitar (1954)
- River of No Return (1954)
- A Star Is Born (1954)
- On the Waterfront (1954)
- Sansho the Bailiff (1954)
- Senso (1954)
- La strada (1954)
- Twenty-Four Eyes (1954)
- Young at Heart (1954)
- All That Heaven Allows (1955)
- The Cobweb (1955)
- Devdas (1955)
- East of Eden (1955)
- The Eternal Breasts (1955)
- Floating Clouds (1955)
- I'll Cry Tomorrow (1955)
- Kiss Me Deadly (1955)
- Love Is a Many-Splendored Thing (1955)
- Love Me or Leave Me (1955)
- The Man with the Golden Arm (1955)
- Not as a Stranger (1955)
- Picnic (1955)
- Rebel Without a Cause (1955)
- Autumn Leaves (1956)
- Baby Doll (1956)
- Bigger Than Life (1956)
- Carousel (1956)
- La escondida (1956)
- Giant (1956)
- Hilda Crane (1956)
- The King and I (1956)
- The Spanish Gardener (1956)
- Tea and Sympathy (1956)
- There's Always Tomorrow (1956)
- Written on the Wind (1956)
- Yield to the Night (1956)
- The Cranes Are Flying (1957)
- Designing Woman (1957)
- Elegy of the North (1957)
- Interlude (1957)
- Lizzie (1957)
- Peyton Place (1957)
- The Tarnished Angels (1957)
- The Three Faces of Eve (1957)
- Tokyo Twilight (1957)
- Cat on a Hot Tin Roof (1958)
- The Defiant Ones (1958)
- I Want to Live! (1958)
- The Long, Hot Summer (1958)
- Some Came Running (1958)
- Too Much, Too Soon (1958)
- Vertigo (1958)
- Imitation of Life (1959)
- Suddenly, Last Summer (1959)
- A Summer Place (1959)

== 1960s ==
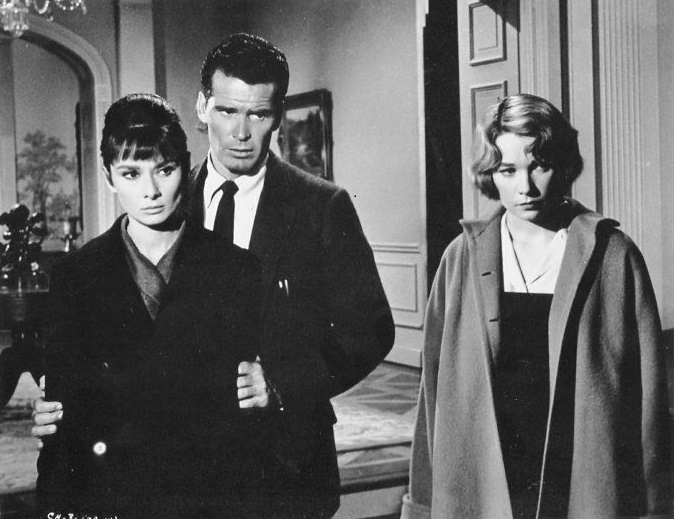
Audrey Hepburn, James Garner and Shirley MacLaine in William Wyler's The Children's Hour (1961).

- The Bramble Bush (1960)
- From the Terrace (1960)
- Home from the Hill (1960)
- La patota (1960)
- Psycho (1960)
- Rocco and His Brothers (1960)
- The Children's Hour (1961)
- Los hermanos del Hierro (1961)
- Return to Peyton Place (1961)
- West Side Story (1961)
- Days of Wine and Roses (1962)
- The Chapman Report (1962)
- The Four Horsemen of the Apocalypse (1962)
- Pueblito (1962)
- Two Weeks in Another Town (1962)
- Vivre sa vie (1962)
- Walk on the Wild Side (1962)
- Asfalto selvagem (1964)
- Marnie (1964)
- The Umbrellas of Cherbourg (1964)
- Doctor Zhivago (1965)
- The Sound of Music (1965)
- Um ramo para Luísa (1965)
- The Great Race (1965)
- Madame X (1966)
- Persona (1966)
- Who's Afraid of Virginia Woolf? (1966)
- The Graduate (1967)
- La soldadera (1967)
- Anne of the Thousand Days (1969)
- The Damned (1969)
- The Passion of Anna (1969)

== 1970s ==
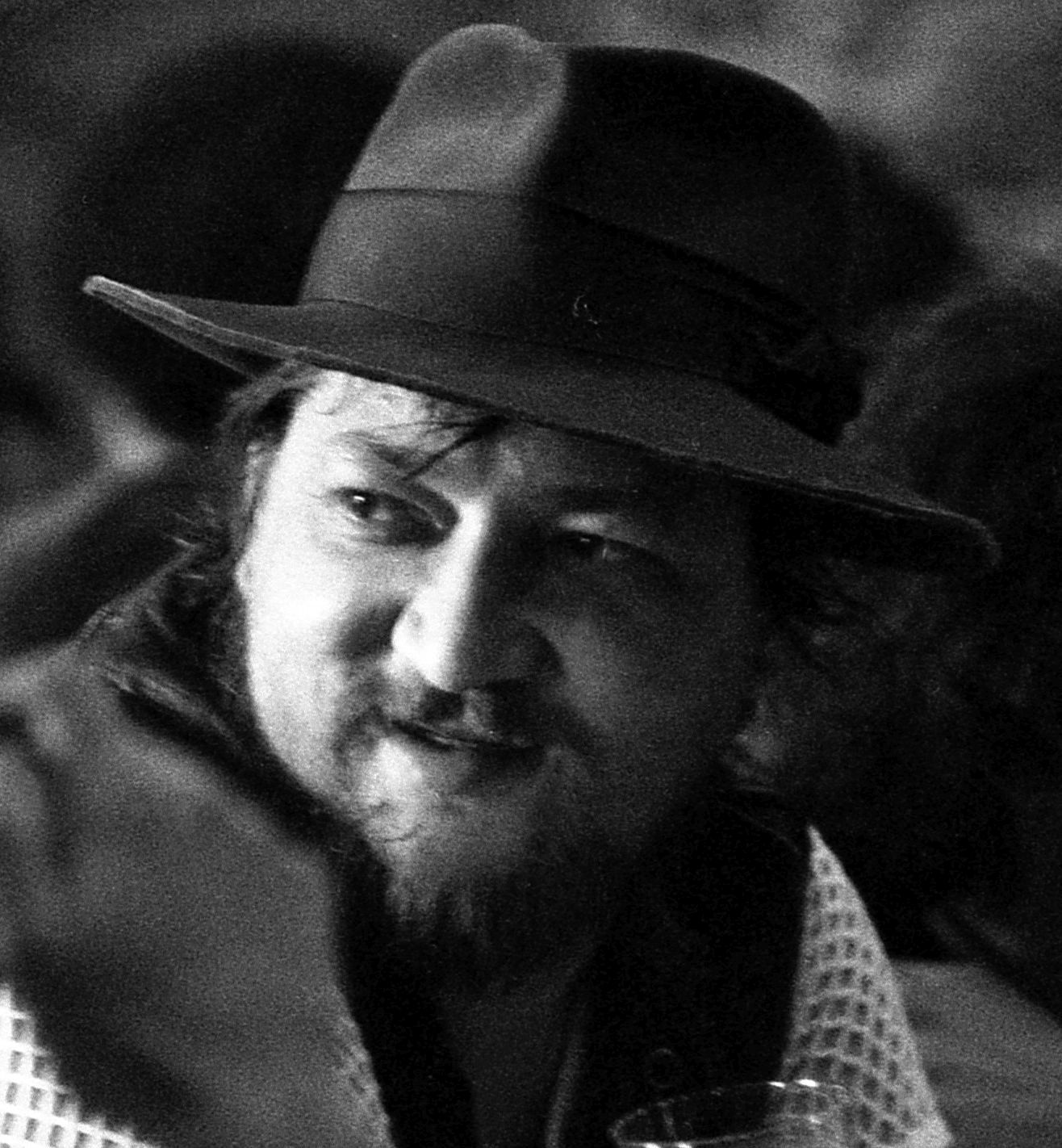
Rainer Werner Fassbinder, director of Sirk-influenced melodramas like The Bitter Tears of Petra von Kant (1972), Ali: Fear Eats the Soul (1974) and The Marriage of Maria Braun (1979), among others.

- Love Story (1970)
- A Man Called Horse (1970)
- Death in Venice (1971)
- The Bitter Tears of Petra von Kant (1972)
- Cabaret (1972)
- Cries and Whispers (1972)
- Deliverance (1972)
- Independência ou morte (1972)
- María (1972)
- The Merchant of Four Seasons (1972)
- Pakeezah (1972)
- The Way We Were (1973)
- Ali: Fear Eats the Soul (1974)
- Celine and Julie Go Boating (1975)
- La Choca (1974)
- Jeanne Dielman, 23 quai du Commerce, 1080 Bruxelles (1975)
- One Flew Over the Cuckoo's Nest (1975)
- Sholay (1975)
- Zona roja (1975)
- Chinese Roulette
- L'innocente (1976)
- Kabhi Kabhie (1976)
- Rocky (1976)
- Julia (1977)
- Autumn Sonata (1978)
- Coma (1978)
- In a Year with 13 Moons (1978)
- The Marriage of Maria Braun (1978)
- Saturday Night Fever (1978)
- Apocalypse Now (1979)
- The Champ (1979)
- Yanks (1979)

== 1980s ==
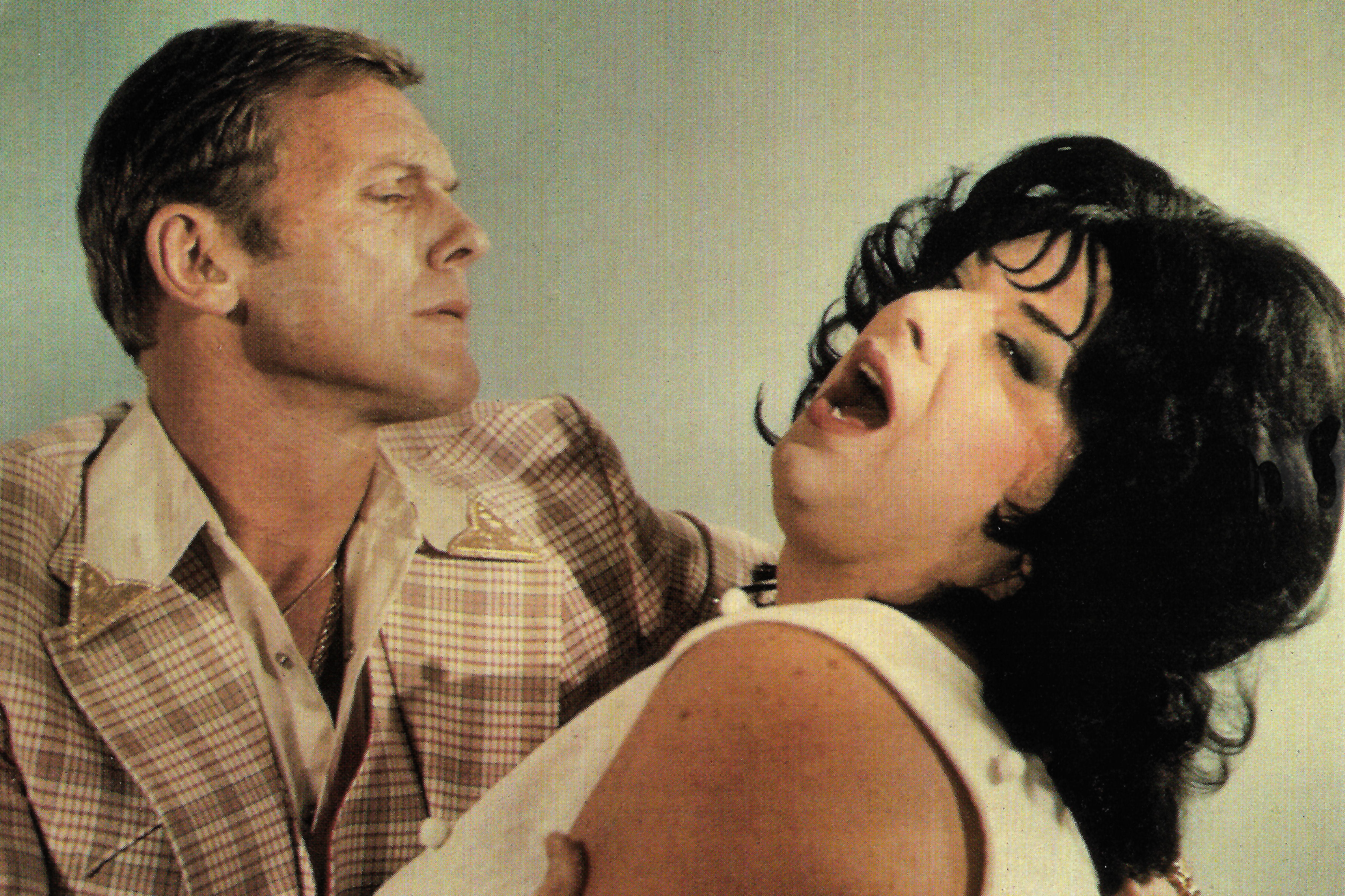
Tab Hunter and Divine in John Waters's Polyester (1981).

- Ordinary People (1980)
- Hôtel des Amériques (1981)
- Lola (1981)
- On Golden Pond (1981)
- Polyester (1981)
- Umrao Jaan (1981)
- The Woman Next Door (1981)
- Come Back to the 5 & Dime, Jimmy Dean, Jimmy Dean (1982)
- Terms of Endearment (1983)
- Yentl (1983)
- Camila (1984)
- La historia oficial (1984)
- Notre histoire (1984)
- Places in the Heart (1984)
- The Color Purple (1985)
- Dance with a Stranger (1985)
- Desert Hearts (1985)
- Kiss of the Spiderwoman (1985)
- My Beautiful Laundrette (1985)
- Rambo: First Blood Part II (1985)
- Rosa la rose, fille publique (1985)
- Mélo (1986)
- Dirty Dancing (1987)
- Maurice (1987)
- Moonstruck (1987)
- Nuts (1987)
- Predator (1987)
- Beaches (1988)
- Dangerous Liaisons (1988)
- Die Hard (1988)
- Distant Voices, Still Lives (1988)
- Torch Song Trilogy (1988)
- Dead Poets Society (1989)
- Field of Dreams (1989)
- Noce blanche (1989)

== 1990s ==
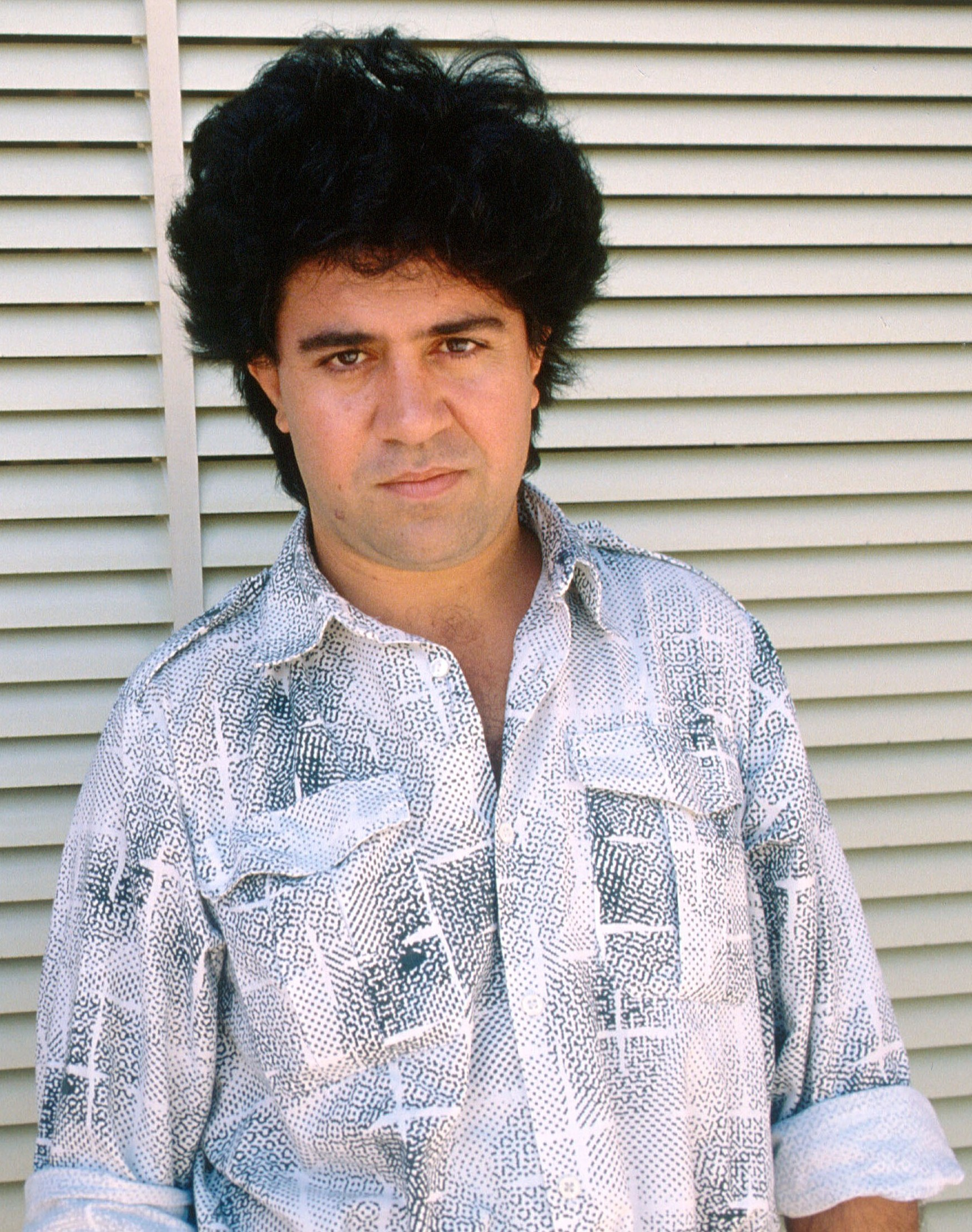
Spanish director Pedro Almodóvar, famous for his use of melodrama.

- Ju Dou (1990)
- Longtime Companion (1990)
- Fried Green Tomatoes (1991)
- Raise the Red Lantern (1991)
- Regarding Henry (1991)
- Salmonberries (1991)
- The Crying Game (1992)
- Lorenzo's Oil (1992)
- The Story of Qiu Ju (1992)
- Farewell My Concubine (1993)
- Philadelphia (1993)
- Schindler's List (1993)
- To Live (1994)
- Braveheart (1995)
- The Bridges of Madison County (1995)
- Dolores Claiborne (1995)
- La flor de mi secreto (1995)
- Safe (1995)
- Shanghai Triad (1995)
- Breaking the Waves (1996)
- Temptress Moon (1996)
- Life Is Beautiful (1997)
- Love! Valour! Compassion! (1997)
- Titanic (1997)
- Festen (1998)
- Angela's Ashes (1999)
- Boys Don't Cry (1999)
- The Insider (1999)
- Magnolia (1999)

== 2000s ==
- Billy Elliot (2000)
- Crouching Tiger, Hidden Dragon (2000)
- Dancer in the Dark (2000)
- Gladiator (2000)
- Asoka (2001)
- 8 Women (2002)
- Devdas (2002)
- Far from Heaven (2002)
- El crimen del Padre Amaro (2002)
- The Hours (2002)
- Olga (2004)
- Dois filhos de Francisco (2005)
- O primo Basílio (2007)

== 2010s ==
- The Artist (2011)
- The Help (2011)
- Les Misérables (2012)
- The Immigrant (2013)
- God's Not Dead (2014)
- Julieta (2016)

== 2020s ==
- Annette (2021)
- Parallel Mothers (2021)
- Empire of Light (2022)
- The Whale (2022)
- Emilia Pérez (2024)
- Mistura (2024)
- Nosferatu (2024)
- Perpetual Adolescent (2025)

== Bibliography ==
- Byars, Jackie (1991). All that Hollywood Allows: Re-reading Gender in 1950s Melodrama. London: Routledge. ISBN 0-415-071178 – via Internet Archive.
- Dixon, Wheeler Winston, ed. (1994). Re-Viewing British Cinema, 1900–1992: Essays and Interviews. Albany: State University of New York Press. ISBN 9780791418611 – via Google Books.
- Gledhill, Christine, ed. (1987). Home is Where the Heart Is: Studies in Melodrama and the Woman's Film. London: British Film Institute. ISBN 0-85170-200-7.
- Heins, Laura (2013). Nazi Film Melodrama. Board of Trustees of the University of Illinois. ISBN 978-0-252-03774-0.
- Karush, Matthew B. (2012). Culture of Class: Radio and Cinema in the Making of a Divided Argentina, 1920–1946. Durham & London: Duke University Press. ISBN 978-0-8223-5243-3.
- Lang, Robert (1989). American Film Melodrama: Griffith, Vidor, Minnelli. Princeton & Guildford: Princeton University Press. ISBN 0-691-04759-6 – via Internet Archive.
- Landy, Marcia, ed. (1991). Imitations of Life: A Reader on Film & Television Melodrama. Contemporary Film and Television Series. Detroit: Wayne State University Press. ISBN 0-8143-2064-3 – via Internet Archive.
- Mafud, Lucio (2016). La imagen ausente. El cine mudo argentino en publicaciones gráficas. Catálogo. El cine de ficción (1914–1923). Investigaciones de la Biblioteca Nacional (in Spanish). Buenos Aires: Biblioteca Nacional; Editorial Teseo. ISBN 978-987-723-096-3.
- Mercer, John; Shingler, Martin (2013) [2004]. Melodrama: Genre, Style, Sensibility (eBook). Short Cuts. London; New York: Wallflower, Columbia University Press. ISBN 978-0-231-50306-8.
- Peña, Fernando Martín (2012). Cien años de cine argentino (eBook) (in Spanish). Buenos Aires: Editorial Biblos. ISBN 978-987-691-098-9.
- Sadlier, Darlene J., ed. (2009). Latin American Melodrama: Passion, Pathos, and Entertainment. Urbana & Chicago: University of Illinois Press. ISBN 978-0-252-03464-0.
- Schatz, Thomas (1981). Hollywood Genres: Formulas, Filmmaking, and the Studio System. New York: Random House. ISBN 0-394-32255-X.
