= Roque Funes =

Argentine cinematographer (1897–1981)

- Roque Funes in the 1950s
- Born: 1 December 1897; Buenos Aires, Argentina
- Died: 15 June 1981 (aged 83); Buenos Aires, Argentina
- Occupations: Cinematographer; Film Director
- Years active: 1921–1964
- Notable work: La Gaucha (1921), Con la música en el alma (1951)

Roque Funes (1 December 1897 – 15 June 1981 in Buenos Aires) was the most prolific Argentine cinematographer in the history of the Cinema of Argentina whose career spanned over 40 years of cinema. Funes is also regarded as a pioneer war correspondent in Latin America for his documentary film En el infierno del Chaco ("In the Hell of Chaco").

Funes began his career in 1921 with director José A. Ferreyra in La Gaucha, working extensively with Ferreyra on films that followed such as Buenos Aires, ciudad de ensueño (1922), La Leyenda del puente inca (1923) and Odio serrano (1924).

In July 1932, Funes traveled to Paraguay, where he recorded the mobilization of Paraguayan troops to face the Bolivian Army during the first stages of the Chaco War, in the course of the battle of Boqueron. Back in Buenos Aires in September, he selected and edited the footage, added explanatory notes and maps, and assembled it into the documentary En el infierno del Chaco in what became his only experience as film director.

In 1939 Funes was the photography director in Edmundo Guibourg's adaptation of Federico García Lorca's Bodas de sangre and Amor. Funes also worked on Capitán Veneno in 1943 and Albergue de mujeres in 1946.

The successful Con la música en el alma was released in 1951 and he worked on the Bárbara atómica film in 1952. His last film was Venus perseguida before his retirement as a cinematographer in 1964.

He died on 15 June 1981 in Buenos Aires aged 83.

== Filmography ==
=== Cinematographer ===
- Venus perseguida (1964)
- Marido de Mulher Boa (1960)
- Del cuplé al tango (1958)
- Violencia en la ciudad (1957)
- El Sonámbulo que quería dormir (1956)
- Escuela de sirenas y tiburones (1955)
- Mi marido hoy duerme en casa (1955)
- Misión extravagante (1954) ... a.k.a. Misión en Buenos Aires (Argentina)
- Siete gritos en el mar (1954)
- Somos todos inquilinos (1954)
- Tres mosquiteros, Los (1953) ... a.k.a. The Three Mosquiteers (International: English title)
- ¡Qué noche de casamiento! (1953)
- Romeo y Julita (1953)
- Suegra último modelo (1953)
- Bárbara atómica (1952)
- Infortunado Fortunato, El (1952)
- ¡Qué rico el mambo! (1952)
- Mucamo de la niña, El (1951)
- Tierra extraña (1951)
- The Path to Crime (1951)
- Con la música en el alma (1951)
- Morocho del Abasto: La vida de Carlos Gardel, El (1950)
- Doctora Castañuelas, La (1950)
- Hombre de las sorpresas, El (1949)
- Todo un héroe (1949)
- Fúlmine (1949)
- Imitaciones peligrosas (1949)
- Nieto de Congreve, El (1949)
- Otra cosa es con guitarra (1949)
- Pantalones cortos (1949)
- Modern Husbands (1948))
- Cuidado con las imitaciones (1948)
- María de los Ángeles (1948)
- Romance sin palabras (1948)
- Lucrezia Borgia (1947)
- An Ideal Husband (1947)
- The Gambler (1947)
- Misterioso tío Sylas, El (1947) a.k.a. The Mysterious Uncle Silas
- Albergue de mujeres (1946)
- 3 millones y el amor (1946)
- Capitán Pérez, El (1946)
- Modelo de París, Un (1946)
- La Amada inmóvil (1945)
- A Woman of No Importance (1945)
- Danza de la fortuna, La (1944) .. a.k.a. The Dance of Fortune (International: English title)
- Dos rivales, Los (1944) ... a.k.a. The Two Rivals (International: English title)
- Deseo, El (1944)
- Sorpresas del divorcio, Las (1943)
- Piel de Zapa, La (1943)
- Captain Poison (1943)
- Pasión impossible (1943)
- Sillón y la gran duquesa, El (1943)
- Suerte llama tres veces, La (1943)
- Malambo (1942)
- Bruma en el Riachuelo (1942)
- The House of the Millions (1942)
- Mañana me suicido (1942)
- Sensational Kidnapping (1942)
- Su primer baile (1942)
- Story of a Poor Young Man (1942)
- Peluquería de señoras (1941)
- Cándida millonaria (1941)
- When the Heart Sings (1941)
- Joven, viuda y estanciera (1941)
- Si yo fuera rica (1941)
- Maestrita de los obreros, La (1941)
- Mother Gloria (1941)
- Más infeliz del pueblo, El (1941)
- Papá tiene novia (1941)
- Mi fortuna por un nieto (1940)
- Celos de Cándida, Los (1940)
- The Tango Star (1940)
- Amor (1940 film)
- De México llegó el amor (1940)
- Pueblo chico, infierno grande (1940)
- Señor mucamo, Un (1940)
- Our Land of Peace (1939)
- Bodas de sangre (1938)
- Barranca abajo (1937)
- Murió el sargento Laprida (1937)
- Mañana es domingo (1934)
- Streets of Buenos Aires (1934)
- Mi último tango (1925)
- Arriero de Yacanto, El (1924)
- Mientras Buenos Aires duerme (1924)
- Odio serrano (1924)
- La Leyenda del puente inca (1923)
- El Puñal del mazorquero (1923)
- Buenos Aires, ciudad de ensueño (1922)
- La Gaucha (1921)

=== Director ===
- En el infierno del Chaco (1932)
