= List of Argentine films of 1938 =

A list of films produced in Argentina in 1938:

Argentine films of 1938
Title	Director	Release	Genre
A - C
Adiós Buenos Aires	Leopoldo Torres Ríos	January 19	Drama
Los apuros de Claudina	Miguel Coronatto Paz	November 9	Comedy
Bodas de sangre	Edmundo Guibourg	November 16	Drama
Busco un marido para mi mujer	Arturo S. Mom	September 21	Comedy
El cabo Rivero	Miguel Coronatto Paz	March 22	Drama
Callejón sin salida	Elías Alippi	March 30	Drama
El canillita y la dama	Luis César Amadori	June 8	Drama
Cantando llegó el amor	James Bauer	September 1	Musical Drama
The Caranchos of Florida	Alberto de Zavalía	November 1	Drama
El casamiento de chichilo	Isidoro Navarro	March 10	Comedy
La chismosa	Enrique Telémaco Susini	May 18	Drama
Con las alas rotas	Orestes Caviglia	June 15	Drama
D - K
De la sierra al valle	Antonio Ber Ciani	December 28	Drama
El diablo con faldas	Ivo Pelay	April 20	Drama
Dos amigos y un amor	Lucas Demare	February 8	Musical
La estancia del gaucho Cruz	Leopoldo Torres Ríos	July 27	Comedy
El hombre que nació dos veces	Oduvaldo Vianna	September 28	Action, Drama, Mystery
Honeysuckle	Luis César Amadori	October 5	Musical
Jettatore	Luis Bayón Herrera	August 10	Comedy
Kilómetro 111	Mario Soffici	August 31	Drama
L - M
La que no perdonó	José A. Ferreyra	September 14	Drama
Las de Barranco	Tito Davison	June 29	Drama
La ley que olvidaron	José A. Ferreyra	Mach 16	Musical Drama
Maestro Levita	Luis César Amadori	February 9	Drama
El mono relojero	Quirino Cristiani	unknown	Animation
Mujeres que trabajan	Manuel Romero	July 6	Comedy
N - S
Nace un amor	Luis Saslavsky	April 27	Drama
Noches de Carnaval	Julio Saraceni	March 2	Comedy
Pampa y cielo	Raúl Gurruchaga	August 24	Western
Plegaria gaucha	Julio Irigoyen	July 7	Western
La rubia del camino	Manuel Romero	April 6	Comedy
Ronda de estrellas	Jack Davison	August 3	Comedy
Senderos de fe	Luis José Moglia Barth	October 26	Musical
Sierra Chica	Julio Irigoyen	May 13	Drama
T - Z
Tres anclados en París	Manuel Romero	January 26	Musical comedy
Turbión	Antonio Momplet	October 18	Drama
El último encuentro	Luis José Moglia Barth	May 22	Drama
Una prueba de Cariño	Ernesto Vilches	June 3	Comedy
Un tipo de suerte	Carlos Calderón de la Barca	October 19	Comedy
Villa Discordia	Arturo S. Mom	March 9	Comedy
La Voz del tambor	Constantino Ambrosione	May 19	Documentary, Propaganda
La vuelta al nido	Leopoldo Torres Ríos	May 4	Drama
