= Carlos Torres Ríos =

Argentine cinematographer, film director, screenwriter, film editor and film producer

Carlos Torres Ríos (1898–1956) was an Argentine cinematographer, film director, screenwriter, film editor and film producer of the classic era.

Born in Buenos Aires, he worked as a cinematographer in films beginning with Palomas rubias (1920), La Gaucha (1921) and Buenos Aires, ciudad de ensueño (1922) and films such as Adiós Buenos Aires (1938) and Al marido hay que seguirlo (1948). He later worked with his brother Leopoldo Torres Ríos in films of the 1940s and 1950s, a highly influential pair in Argentine cinema.

He had a number of credits as a director, screenwriter, editor and film producer in his own right, directing and screenwriting Bólidos de acero in 1950.

== Filmography ==
=== Director ===
- Un hombre bueno (1941)
- La luna en el pozo (1942)
- Fuego en la montaña (1943)
- Santos Vega Returns (1947)
- Con los mismos colores (1949)
- Mary tuvo la culpa (1950)
- Bólidos de acero (1950)
- Rhythm, Salt and Pepper (1951)
- Tierra extraña (1951)
- La niña de fuego (1952)
- Somos todos inquilinos (1954)
