= Figner =

The surname Figner may refer to:

- Aleksandr Figner (1787—1813), Russian colonel
- Vera Figner (1852–1942), Russian revolutionary
- Lydia Figner (1853–1920), Russian revolutionary
- Nikolay and Medea Figner, Russian opera duo
  - Nikolay Figner (1857–1918), lyric tenor
  - Medea Figner (1859–1952), mezzo-soprano, later soprano
- Federico Figner, German-born Argentine cinematographer
- Fred Figner, Czech-born Jewish emigrant, pioneer in recording and selling Brazilian popular music
