= Muñequitas porteñas =

1931 film

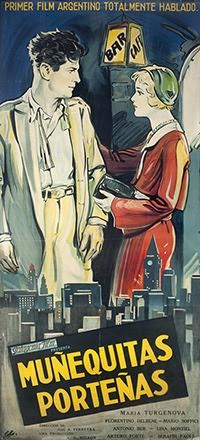
- Theatrical release poster.
- Directed by: José A. Ferreyra
- Release date: 7 August 1931
- Running time: 73 minute
- Country: Argentina
- Language: Spanish

Muñequitas porteñas (also known as Muñequita porteña) is a 1931 Argentine film directed by José A. Ferreyra. A pioneering sound film, it is widely considered to be the first Argentine feature film with spoken dialogue, using the sound-on-disc Vitaphone system. Although the film has been preserved and restored, the sound discs were lost, leaving it silent. Two years after the release of Muñequitas porteñas, the premiere of the country's first optical sound films ushered the Golden Age of Argentine cinema.

== Cast ==
- Antonio Ber Ciani ... Rodolfo
- Julio Bunge ... Peluquero
- Floren Delbene ... Alberto
- Arturo Forte ... Héctor Laborda
- Dionisio Giácomo ... Marinero
- Laura Montiel ... Adela
- Serafín Paoli ... Don Nicola
- Edel Randon ... Blanca
- Mario Soffici ... Don Antonio
- Rivela Toñetti ... Margot
- María Turgenova ... María Esther
