= Amelia Mirel =

Argentine vedette, singer and silent-film actress

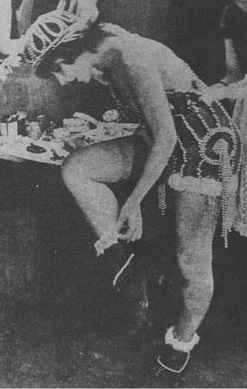
- Amelia Mirel in the film Midinettes porteñas (1923)
- Born: Amelia Ruggero ca. 1907; Buenos Aires, Argentina
- Died: 14 June 1987; Buenos Aires, Argentina
- Occupation(s): actress, vedette
- Years active: 1920s–1950s

Amelia Mirel or Alma Bambú was the stage name of Amelia Ruggero, an early Argentine vedette, singer, and silent-film actress. After making approximately 20 movies, Mirel changed her stage name to Alma Bambú and began dancing in musical revues and burlesque theater.

== Filmography ==
- Aves de rapiña (1921)
- Patagonia (1921)
- Jangada florida (1922)
- Allá en el sur (1922)
- Escándalo de medianoche (1923)
- La leyenda del puente inca (1923)
- Midinettes porteñas (1923)
- Fausto (1923)
- La casa de los cuervos (1923)
- Carne de presidio (1924)
- Criollo viejo (1924)
- El Viejo Morador de las Montañas (1924)
- Muñecos de cera (1925)
- El penado catorce (1930)
