= Chimbela =

- Directed by: José A. Ferreyra
- Produced by: José A. Ferreyra
- Release date: 1939
- Running time: 69 minutes
- Country: Argentina
- Language: Spanish

Chimbela is a 1939 Argentine musical film drama directed by José A. Ferreyra. The film stars Floren Delbene and Armando Bo. It premiered in Buenos Aires during the Golden Age of Argentine cinema.

== Cast ==
- Elena Lucena
- Floren Delbene
- Eloy Álvarez
- Nuri Montsé
- Salvador Lotito
- Mary Dormal
- Carlos Castro
