= Antonio Capuano (actor) =

Argentine actor

Antonio Capuano (died 1963) was an Argentine actor. He starred in the 1950 film Bólidos de acero under director Carlos Torres Ríos.

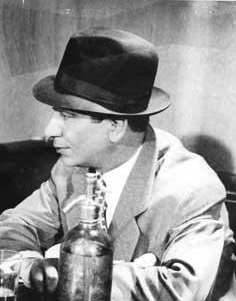
Antonio Capuano

== Selected filmography ==
- Santos Vega Returns (1947)
- The Black Market (1953)
- The White Land (1959)
