= Viamonte =

Viamonte may refer to:

- Juan José Viamonte, 19th century Argentine general.
- General Viamonte Partido, a political division in Buenos Aires Province, Argentina.
- Avelino Viamonte, 1908 Argentine film.
- Juan Bitrián de Viamonte y Navarra, colonial governor of Cuba.
- Town in Unión Department, Córdoba Province, Argentina.
- Carlos Sánchez Viamonte, member of the Argentine University Federation.
- Barão de Viamonte da Boa Vista, Portuguese baron.
- Modesto Sánchez Viamonte, member of the Civic Youth Union of Argentina.
- Viamonte FC, an Association Football club in Argentina.
- 6th "General Viamonte" Mechanized Infantry Regiment in Argentina.
- Florinda Viamontes, javelin throw competitor at the 1938 Central American and Caribbean Games.
