= Estaciones Porteñas =

Tango compositions by Ástor Piazzolla

The Cuatro Estaciones Porteñas, also known as the Estaciones Porteñas or The Four Seasons of Buenos Aires, are a set of four tango compositions written by Astor Piazzolla, which were originally conceived and treated as different compositions rather than one suite, although Piazzolla performed them together from time to time. The pieces were scored for his quintet of violin (viola), piano, electric guitar, double bass and bandoneón. By giving the adjective porteño, referring to those born in Buenos Aires, the Argentine capital city, Piazzolla gives an impression of the four seasons in Buenos Aires. The order of performance Piazzolla gave to his "Estaciones Porteñas" is: Otoño (Autumn), Invierno (Winter), Primavera (Spring), Verano (Summer). It was different from Vivaldi's order, and reflects the different seasons experienced simultaneously in the Northern and Southern hemispheres.

== The Seasons ==
1. Verano Porteño (Buenos Aires Summer)
  written in 1965, originally as incidental music for the play 'Melenita de oro' by Alberto Rodríguez Muñoz.
2. Invierno Porteño (Buenos Aires Winter)
  written in 1969.
3. Primavera Porteña (Buenos Aires Spring)
  premiered in 1969, contains counterpoint.
4. Otoño Porteño (Buenos Aires Autumn)
  premiered 1969.

From 1996-1998, the Russian composer Leonid Desyatnikov made a new arrangement of the above four pieces with a more obvious link between Vivaldi's 'Four Seasons' and Piazzolla's by converting each of Piazzolla's movements into three sections and arranging the suite for solo violin and string orchestra. In each movement, Desyatnikov includes several quotations from Vivaldi's original work. Desyatnikov reflects the inversion of the seasons between the hemisphere in his placement of the Vivaldi quotations; for example, Verano Porteño (Summer) has added elements of L'invierno (Winter) from Vivaldi.
