= Bárbara atómica =

- Directed by: Julio Saraceni
- Written by: Abel Santa Cruz
- Starring: Juan Carlos Thorry; Blanquita Amaro
- Cinematography: Roque Funes
- Edited by: Jacinto Cascales
- Music by: Tito Ribero
- Release date: 1952
- Running time: 92 minutes
- Country: Argentina
- Language: Spanish

Bárbara atómica is a 1952 Argentine film of the classical era of Argentine cinema, directed by Julio Saraceni and written by Abel Santa Cruz based on Michel Duran's play, "Barbara Bow". It was released on May 23, 1952.

== Cast ==
- Juan Carlos Thorry
- Blanquita Amaro
- Adolfo Stray
- Ubaldo Martínez
- Lalo Maura
- Ramón J. Garay
- María Esther Duckse
- Guido Gorgatti
