= Dos amigos y un amor =

- Directed by: Lucas Demare
- Release date: 1938
- Country: Argentina
- Language: Spanish

Dos amigos y un amor is a 1938 Argentine musical film comedy directed by Lucas Demare during the Golden Age of Argentine cinema. The film was premièred in Buenos Aires.

== Cast ==
- Pepe Iglesias
- Juan Carlos Thorry
- Norma Castillo
- Santiago Gómez Cou
- María Esther Buschiazzo
- Francisco Bastardi
- Francisco Canaro
- Ángela Fernández
