= In the Hell of Chaco =

1932 film

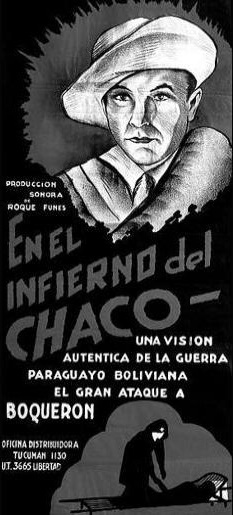
En el Infierno del Chaco original poster

In the Hell of Chaco (Spanish: En el infierno del Chaco) is an Argentine black-and-white, silent war documentary directed and filmed by Roque Funes from his own script. It premiered on 21 December 1932.

== Cast ==
- President Eusebio Ayala ... Himself
- Mariscal José Félix Estigarribia ... Himself
- Julia Miranda Cueto ... Herself

== Overview ==
The Chaco War between Bolivia and Paraguay originated in a dispute over the sovereignty of the Chaco Boreal region. The Argentine cameraman and cinematographer Roque Funes traveled to the region in July 1932 and recorded the first three months of the conflict, focusing specially on the battle of Boqueron. Back in Buenos Aires, Funes assembled and edited the footage and added maps and explanatory texts into a documentary. The film was thought lost for many years, but an original copy to nitrate was retained by the Estragó family in Paraguay. Hugo Gamarra, President of the Cinematheque of Paraguay, worked with the Asociación de Apoyo al Patrimonio Audiovisual (APROCINAIN) on the restoration of this copy in Buenos Aires, with the cooperation of Cinecolor and Kodak.

Appearing in the film were Eusebio Ayala, President of Paraguay, Marshal José Félix Estigarribia, commander of the Paraguayan troops, and his wife Julia Miranda Cueto. Shortly after being elected president of Paraguay on 15 August 1939, Estigarribia died alongside his wife on 7 September 1940 in a plane crash in Loma Grande.

== Comments ==
The film is said to be: "Elemental in ideology, the enemy is demonized as Bolivian counterpart to the heroic deeds performed by Paraguay at a disadvantage. It is also a unique historical document, by the fact that records, such as film (with creative resources and improbable mood for your theme) and as journalism". Roque Funes said: "Nobody can give a full account of what this is. The fighting leaves a trail of mangled bodies and the stench from the decay of rapidly decomposing corpses".

== Advertisement ==
The advertisement banner of the film, whose ticket cost two pesos, reads: "The only film of the Paraguayan-Bolivian war, filmed with the permission of the Government of Paraguay. The real expression of the struggle in the Chaco Boreal, under a sky of fire, shot by the Argentine 'cameraman' Roque Funes, who with the kind collaboration of the Government of Paraguay, managed to take the most interesting notes of the current war. The attack on Boquerón. The Bolivian offensive. Flying over the line of fire. Troops pushing through the jungle. Bayonet charge. Artillery in action. Fall of Boqueron. Wounded and prisoners up to Asuncion and a thousand scenes of war taken in the same fields from the front. The horror and heroism of the man in front of thirst, hunger and death."
