= Fred Figner =

Austrian Empire-born entrepreneur, cinema, and music industry pioneer

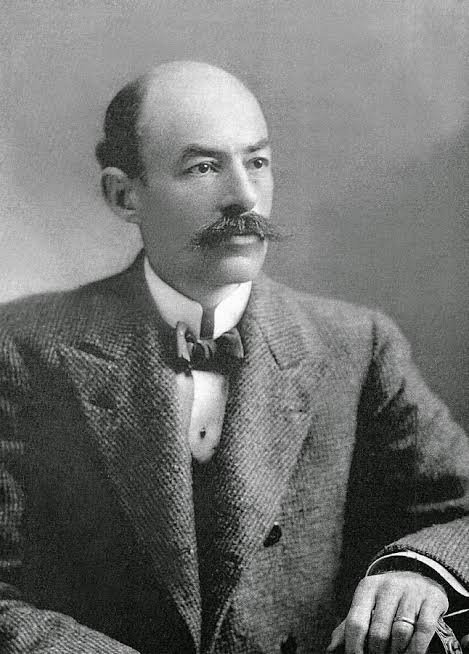
- Born: 2 December 1866; Milevsko, Austrian Empire
- Died: 19 January 1947 (aged 80)
- Occupations: Salesman, entrepreneur

Fred Figner (2 December 1866 Milevsko - 19 January 1947), also known as Frederico Figner, born as Friedrich Figner, was an Austrian Empire-born entrepreneur, and cinema and music industry pioneer mostly in South America.

== Biography ==
Figner was a Jewish emigrant who lived in the United States and landed in Belém, Brazil in 1891. He traveled to many regions of Brazil doing public exhibitions of Edison's phonograph. Nine years later Figner settled down in Rio de Janeiro, where he established in 1900 the Casa Edison, the first commercial recording company in Brazil. The company is considered a pioneer in recording and selling Brazilian popular music. He also founded Odeon, the first Brazilian factory of phonograph records.

In 1896 he filmed in Argentina what are now considered the first three films of the country. Figner's three films consisted of short depictions of sights of the city of Buenos Aires (named Vistas de Palermo, La Avenida de Mayo and La Plaza de Mayo) and were screened 24 November 1896.

Little is known of Figner regarding his filming activities, and his work is usually obscured by that of Eugenio Py's, a Frenchman who filmed in 1897 La Bandera Argentina ("The Argentine Flag").
