= Amor (film) =

1940 film

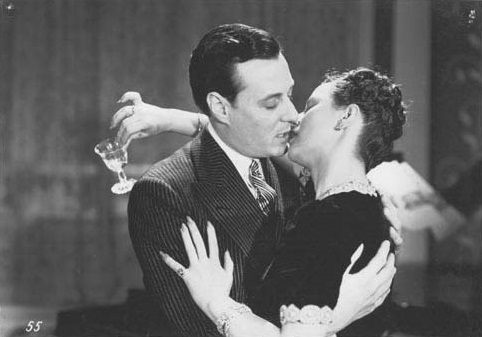
- A scene from the film Amor
- Directed by: Luis Bayón Herrera
- Written by: Luis Bayón Herrera
- Starring: Salvador Arcella; Severo Fernández
- Cinematography: Roque Funes
- Edited by: José Cardella
- Music by: Alejandro Gutiérrez del Barrio; Alberto Soifer
- Release date: 1940
- Running time: 106 minutes
- Country: Argentina
- Language: Spanish

Amor (English: Love) is a 1940 Argentine comedy film of the Golden Age of Argentine cinema directed and written by Luis Bayón Herrera and starring Severo Fernández.

== Cast ==
- Salvador Arcella
- Severo Fernández
- Regina Laval
- Aída Luz
- Mirtha Montchel
- Pepita Muñoz
- Ernesto Raquén
- Pepita Serrador
- Adolfo Stray
- Iris Tortorelli
