= Blood Wedding =

Play by Federico García Lorca

- Original language: Spanish
- Written by: Federico García Lorca
- Characters: Bridegroom; Bridegroom's Mother; Bride; Bride's Father; Leonardo; Leonardo's Wife; Leonardo's Mother-in-law; Maid; Neighbour; Moon; Death; Three Woodcutters; Two Young Men; Girl; Three Girls; Little Girl; Three Guests; Woman; Neighbours
- Genre: Rural tragedy

Premiere
- Date: 1933

Blood Wedding (Spanish: Bodas de sangre) is a tragedy by Spanish dramatist Federico García Lorca. It was written in 1932 and first performed at Teatro Beatriz in Madrid in March 1933, then later that year in Buenos Aires, Argentina.

The play is set in rural Spain and according to some sources was inspired by real life events which took place in Almeria in the 1920s. Theatre critics often group Blood Wedding with García Lorca's Yerma and The House of Bernarda Alba as the "rural trilogy". García Lorca's planned "trilogy of the Spanish earth" remained unfinished at the time of his death, as he did not include The House of Bernarda Alba in this group of works.

== Characters ==
- La Madre – The Mother of the Groom
- El Novio – The Groom
- La Novia – The Bride
- El Padre De La Novia – The Father of The Bride
- Leonardo
- La Mujer De Leonardo – Leonardo's wife
- La Suegra de Leonardo – Leonardo's Mother-in-law
- La Criada – The Maid
- La Vecina – The Neighbour (woman)
- Muchachas – Young Women
- Muchachos – Young Men
- La Luna – The Moon
- La Muerte (como mendiga) – Death (as a beggar)
- Leñadores – Woodcutters

== Plot summary ==
=== Act I ===
As the play opens, the Mother speaks with her son, the Groom. It is revealed that the Groom's father and brother were killed a few years ago by men from the Felix family. When the Groom asks for a knife to cut olives in the vineyard, the Mother reacts cautiously. Before giving him the knife, she discusses the cycles of violence and her trepidation. The Groom leaves after hugging his mother goodbye.

The Neighbor arrives to chat with the Mother and reveals to her that the Bride was previously involved with a man named Leonardo Felix, a relative of the men who killed the Mother's husband and son. The Mother, who still hates the Felix family, is furious, but decides to visit the girl before bringing the matter up with the Groom.

Leonardo, now married, returns to his home after work. When he enters, the Mother-In-Law and the Wife are singing a lullaby to his son. The lullaby's lyrics foreshadow the tragedies that will occur later in the play. It is clear that Leonardo's marriage is not a happy one. A Little Girl enters the house and tells the family that the Groom is preparing to marry the Bride. Leonardo flies into a rage, scaring his Wife, the Mother-In-Law, and the Little Girl as he storms out of the house.

The Mother goes to the Bride's house, along with the Groom, where she meets the Bride's Servant and the Father of the Bride. The Father tells the Mother about his dead wife and his desire to see his daughter marry and bear children. The Bride enters and speaks with the Mother and the Groom. The Father then shows them out, leaving the Servant with the Bride. The Servant teases the Bride about the gifts that the Groom brought, then reveals to her that Leonardo has been coming to the house at night to watch the Bride's window.

=== Act II ===
On the morning of the wedding, Leonardo comes to see the Bride again. He speaks of his desire for her and the pride that kept him from marrying her before. The Bride, disturbed by his presence, attempts to silence him, but cannot deny that she still has feelings for him. The Servant sends Leonardo away, and guests begin arriving. The Father, the Mother and the Groom arrive, and the wedding party moves to the church. The Bride begs the Groom to keep her safe. Leonardo and his Wife go as well, after a short and furious argument.

After the wedding, the guests, the families and the newlywed couple return to the Bride's house. The party progresses, with music and dancing, but the Bride retires to her room, claiming that she feels tired. Leonardo's Wife tells the Groom that her husband left on horseback, but the Groom brushes her off, saying that Leonardo simply went for a quick ride. The Groom returns to the main room and speaks with his Mother.

The guests then begin searching for the Bride and Groom, hoping to begin a traditional wedding dance. However, the Bride is nowhere to be found. The Father orders the house searched, but Leonardo's Wife bursts into the room and announces that her husband and the Bride have eloped. The Father refuses to believe it, but the Groom angrily rides off with a friend to kill Leonardo. The Mother, frenzied and furious, orders the entire wedding party out into the night to search for the runaways as the Father collapses in grief.

=== Act III ===
In the forest (to which Leonardo and the Bride have fled), three woodcutters emerge to discuss the events (in a manner somewhat similar to that of a Greek chorus, except that they speak to each other, not to the audience). They reveal that searchers have infiltrated the entire forest, and that Leonardo will be caught soon if the Moon comes out.

As they flee the stage, the Moon appears in the form of a young woodcutter with a white face. She states that by the end of the night, blood will be spilt. Death, disguised as an old beggar woman, enters and speaks of the finiteness of life and how the night will end in death. She orders the Moon to provide much light before exiting.

Up in fury, the Groom enters along with a Youth from the wedding party. The Youth is disturbed by the dark forest and urges the Groom to turn back, but the Groom refuses, vowing to kill Leonardo and reclaim his Bride. Death, disguised, re-enters, telling the Groom that she has seen Leonardo and can lead the Groom to him. The Groom exits with her.

Elsewhere in the forest, the woodcutters are chopping wood, praying that the lovers will be spared before exiting. Leonardo and the Bride run on and discuss their future together. Both are consumed by their burning, unsustainable love for each other, as passion like no other is shared between the two of them. The Bride begs Leonardo to flee, but he refuses. The couple hear footsteps; the Groom and Death are coming near. Leonardo exits, and two screams ring out in the darkness. The Moon and Death reappear at the end of the scene. Leonardo and the Groom have killed each other.

In the town, the women (including Leonardo's Wife and the Mother-in-Law) have gathered near the church to whisper of the events. Death arrives and, before departing, announces that doom has visited the forest. The Mother enters the church, full of anger and bitterness, only to see the Bride returning—her dress covered in the blood of both her lovers. Presumably (although this is never explicitly stated), the Bride is afterwards killed as a sacrifice to restore the family's honour. Still, in some incarnations of the play, it is suggested that the Mother allows the Bride to live based on the idea that living with the pain of her lovers' deaths is a more severe punishment than death.

== Published editions ==
- García Lorca, Federico – Blood Wedding, tr. Langston Hughes (Theatre Communications Group: New York) ISBN 1-55936-080-1
- García Lorca, Federico – Blood Wedding, ed. Tanya Ronder (Nick Hern Books: London) ISBN 978-1-85459-855-4
- García Lorca, Federico – Bodas de sangre (Alianza Editorial: Spain) ISBN 84-206-6101-5
- García Lorca, Federico – Bodas de sangre (Ediciones Catedra: Spain) ISBN 84-376-0560-1
- García Lorca, Federico – Bodas de sangre (Ediciones Colihue: Argentina) ISBN 950-581-110-1

== Productions and adaptations ==
- The play, translated into English and retitled Bitter Oleander, had a brief Broadway run in 1935.
- In 1938, the play was adapted in Argentina as a film of the same title, starring Margarita Xirgu and her theatre company.
- Denis ApIvor composed a ballet version in 1953 for The Royal Ballet.
- The 1957 opera Bluthochzeit by Wolfgang Fortner is adapted from Henrique Beck's German translation of the play.
- In 1959, BBC Television made an adaptation of the play.
- In 1964, Vérnász, an operatic adaptation of the play with a score by Hungarian composer Sándor Szokolay, was first produced in Budapest. The opera has been produced again in the years since.
- In 1973, the play was produced in English translation at La MaMa Experimental Theatre Club in Manhattan, New York.
- The play was adapted as a Moroccan film in 1977, also titled Blood Wedding.
- In 1981, Spanish film director Carlos Saura directed a dance film based on the play, also titled Blood Wedding.
- In 1986, the BBC World Service broadcast a radio adaptation of the play starring Anna Massey, Juliet Stevenson, and Alan Rickman.
- A 2006 Haitian operatic adaptation of the play, titled Le Maryaj Lenglensou, was produced by Dutch filmmaker Hans Fels with a score by Haitian composer Iphares Blain. A documentary about this production premiered at the 2007 Netherlands Film Festival.
- In 2007, BBC Radio 3 broadcast a new production of the play directed by Pauline Harris, and featuring Barbara Flynn as The Mother. It used Ted Hughes' translation from 1996.
- In 2015, a Spanish film adaptation titled The Bride directed by Paula Ortiz was released.
- In August/September 2016, the play was produced at a theater in Tegucigalpa, Honduras.
- An adaptation by Marina Carr, directed by Yael Farber, was performed at The Young Vic from September to November 2019.
- A Dutch translation by Dolf Verspoor, directed by Wim Vandekeybus, was performed by Toneelgroep Amsterdam at the Internationaal Theater Amsterdam in 2023.
