= North Wind (film) =

- Directed by: Mario Soffici
- Written by: Lucio V. Mansilla (book "Una excursión a los indios ranqueles"); Mario Soffici; Alberto Vacarezza
- Cinematography: Antonio Merayo
- Edited by: Nicolás Proserpio
- Release dates: 13 October 1937 (Argentina); 15 September 1939 (U.S.)
- Running time: 92 minute
- Country: Argentina
- Language: Spanish

North Wind (Spanish: Viento norte) is a 1937 Argentine film of the Golden Age of Argentine cinema directed by Mario Soffici.

In a survey of the 100 greatest films of Argentine cinema carried out by the Museo del Cine Pablo Ducrós Hicken in 2000, the film reached the 39th position.

== Cast ==
- Camila Quiroga
- Enrique Muiño
- Elías Alippi
- Ángel Magaña
