= Mientras Buenos Aires duerme =

1924 film

- Directed by: José A. Ferreyra
- Written by: José A. Ferreyra
- Produced by: José A. Ferreyra
- Cinematography: Roque Funes
- Release date: 1924
- Country: Argentina
- Languages: Silent film Spanish intertitles

Mientras Buenos Aires duerme is a 1924 silent Argentine film directed and written by José A. Ferreyra. The film premiered in 1924 in Buenos Aires.

== Cast ==
- Anselmo Aieta
- Mary Clay
- Julio Donadille
- Augusto Gocalbes
- Jorge Lafuente
- Percival Murray
