= Bólidos de acero =

- Theatrical release poster
- Directed by: Carlos Torres Ríos
- Written by: Carlos Torres Ríos
- Produced by: Carlos Torres Ríos
- Starring: Mario Baroffio; Antonio Capuano; Rodolfo Crespi
- Cinematography: Julio C. Lavera
- Edited by: José Cardella
- Music by: Ástor Piazzolla
- Release date: 1950
- Running time: 80 minutes
- Country: Argentina
- Language: Spanish

Bólidos de acero (English language: Racecars of Steel) is a 1950 Argentine melodrama musical film of the classical era of Argentine cinema, directed and written by Carlos Torres Ríos with music by Ástor Piazzolla.

The film is based on tango dancing, an integral part of Argentine culture.

== Cast ==
- Mario Baroffio
- Antonio Capuano
- Rodolfo Crespi
- Nelly Darén
- Alberto del Solar
- Roberto Durán
- Jorge L. Fossati
- Luis Laneri
- Francisco Lizzio
- Ricardo Lorenzo
- Domingo Márquez
- Tito Martínez
- Mario Medrano
- Ermete Meliante
- Francisco Monet
- Ricardo Passano hijo
- Roberto Real
- María Luisa Santés
- Semillita
- Oscar Villa
- Jorge Villoldo
- Diana Wells
