= El diablo con faldas =

- Directed by: Ivo Pelay
- Release date: 1938
- Running time: 87 minute
- Country: Argentina
- Language: Spanish

El diablo con faldas is a 1938 Argentine drama film directed by Ivo Pelay during the Golden Age of Argentine cinema. The film premiered in Buenos Aires.

== Synopsis ==
A revue theater company alters the life of the mayor when it arrives in his town.
