= Blood Wedding (1938 film) =

- Spanish: Bodas de sangre
- Directed by: Edmundo Guibourg
- Written by: Edmundo Guibourg
- Based on: Blood Wedding; 1931 play by Federico García Lorca
- Release date: 1938
- Running time: 98 minutes
- Country: Argentina
- Language: Spanish

Blood Wedding (Spanish: Bodas de sangre) is a 1938 Argentine film written and directed by Edmundo Guibourg, the first film adaptation of Federico García Lorca's 1931 tragic play of the same name. It stars Spanish actress Margarita Xirgu—the main actress with whom Lorca had worked—alongside a cast that included mainly members of her theater company: Pedro López Lagar, Amelia de la Torre, Helena Cortesina, Eloísa Vigo, Amalia Sánchez Ariño, Enrique Diosdado, Alberto Contreras and Luisa Sala. The making of the film was intended as a tribute to Lorca, who had been assassinated in 1936.

== Cast ==
- Margarita Xirgu
- Pedro López Lagar
- Enrique Diosdado
- Amalia Sánchez Ariño
- Amelia de la Torre
- Helena Cortesina

== See also ==
- List of Argentine films of 1938
