= Camila Quiroga =

Argentine actress (1891–1948)

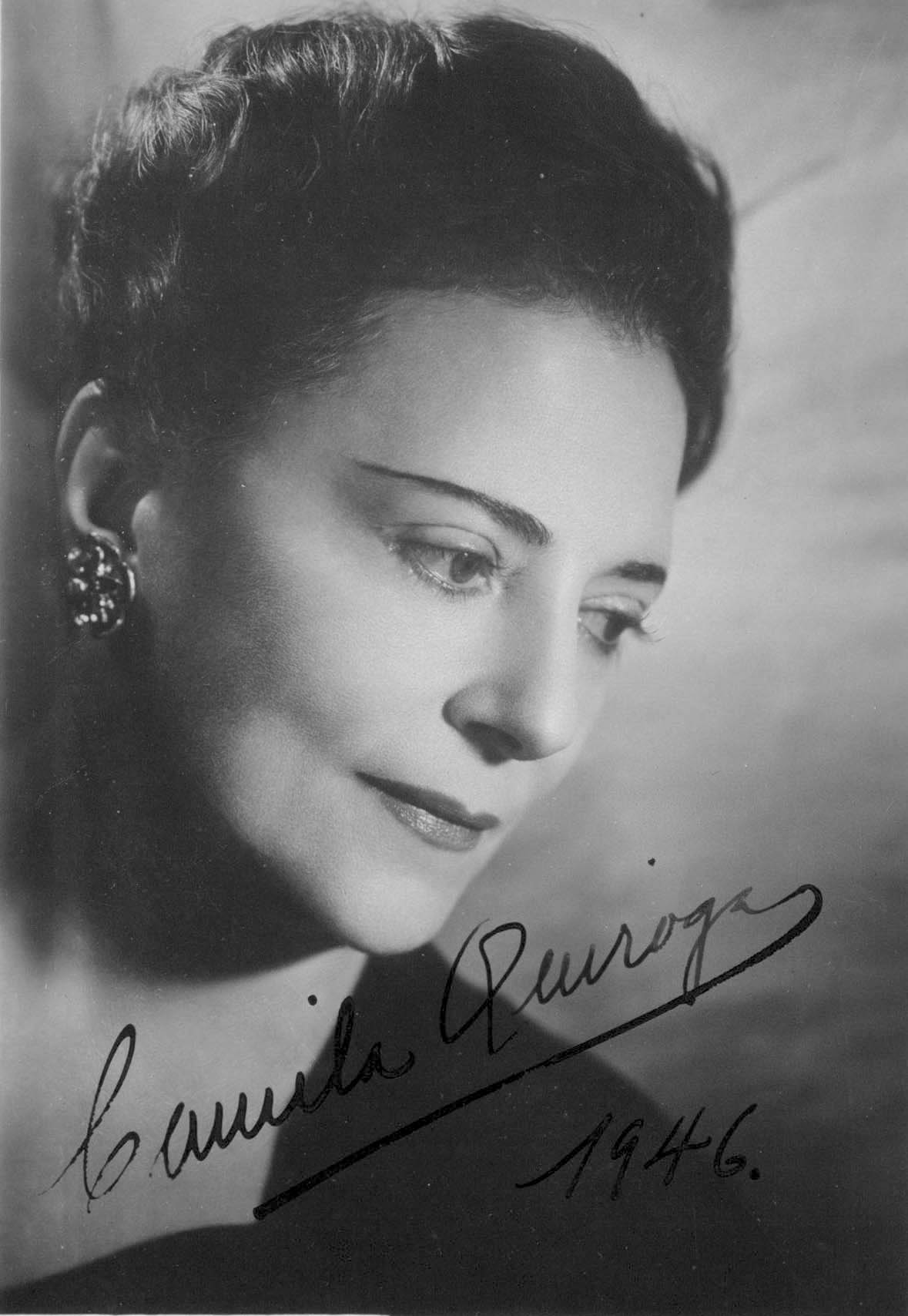
- Signed portrait of Camila Quiroga, 1946.
- Born: Camila Josefa Ramona Pássera; March 19, 1891; Chajarí, Entre Rios, Argentina
- Died: February 28, 1948 (aged 56); Buenos Aires, Argentina
- Occupation: Actress

Camila Josefa Ramona Pássera (March 19, 1891, in Chajarí, Entre Rios, Argentina – February 28, 1948, in Buenos Aires, Argentina) was an Argentine actress acclaimed in America and Europe. She was also one of the founding members of "Asociación Argentina de Actores" (Argentine Actors Association).

== Biography ==
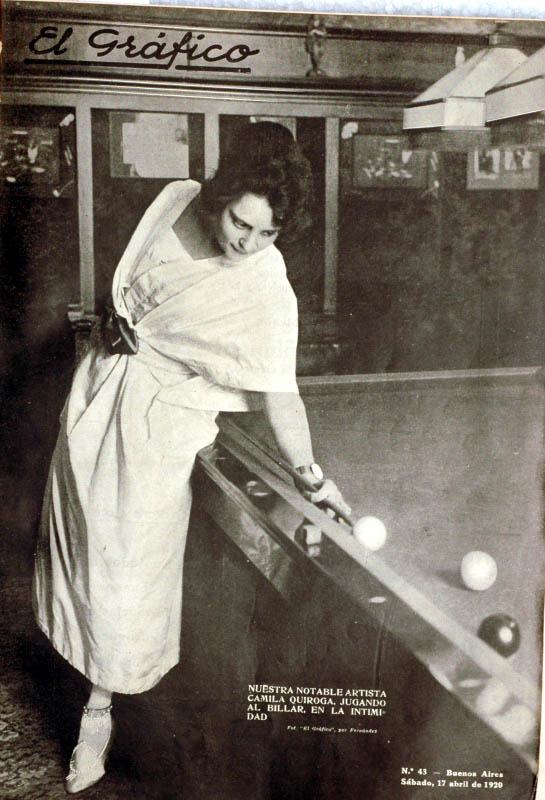
Camila Quiroga playing billiard on the cover of El Gráfico, 1920.

Quiroga arrived in Buenos Aires in 1906 to start her career as actress. He debuted in the "Compañía Nacional de Aficionados", an amateur company directed by Armando Discéplo and Rafael Da Rosa. Quiroga's professional debut was in 1909 being part of José Tallavi's company, moving then to Teatro Marconi where she met entrepreneur Héctor Quiroga, who would be her husband.

Years later, Quiroga joined the Jerónimo and Pablo Podestá companies, starring the theatre play Con las Alas Rotas (written by Emilio Berisso), that was played more than 350 times.

In 1918 Quiroga created her own company, with the purpose of introducing the "criollo" theatre through the world. She played in Nueva York, París, Lisboa, Madrid, Barcelona, Rio de Janeiro, Lima, La Habana, México DF, La Paz, Quito, Bogotá, Caracas and Asunción, among other cities. The repertory were plays by Argentine notable writers such as Roberto Payró, Florencio Sánchez, Gregorio de Laferrere, Alberto Vacarezza, José de Maturana, José González Castillo, Luis Bayón Herrera, Vicente Martínez Cuitiño, Emilio Berisso, Francisco Defilippis Novoa, Roberto Cayol.

Camila and Héctor toured successfully on Europe, with a notable success in Spain, Portugal and France. Camila Quiroga also worked with Tango singer Carlos Gardel, and other remarkable artists such as Florencio Parravicini, Lola Membrives, Pablo Podestá, Blanca Podestá, Enrique Muiño, Angel Magaña, Delia Garcés, Gogó Andreu, Milagros de la Vega y Pedro López Lagar and Alfonsina Storni.

Camila Quiroga is the first woman I met who thought Latin American culture as a whole. Camila is the revelation of ourselves

— Gabriela Mistral

After the "Tragic Week" of 1919, Quiroga's engagement with social causes led her to establish the Argentine Actors Association,

Apart from her wide stage career, Quiroga starred nine movies between 1916 and 1918 until Juan Sin Ropa (inspired on Santos Vega and directed by Georges Benoît) which brought Quiroga to massive audiences. Other films where she took part where Viento Norte and Veinte Años y Una Noche. Quiroga also worked on several radio dramas between 1930 and 1945.

Camila Quiroga died at 56 years old after spent her vacations in Villa Giardino, Córdoba. Her daughter, Nélida Quiroga, was also an actress. Camila Quiroga's born house was opened in 1978 as a museum.

== Filmography ==
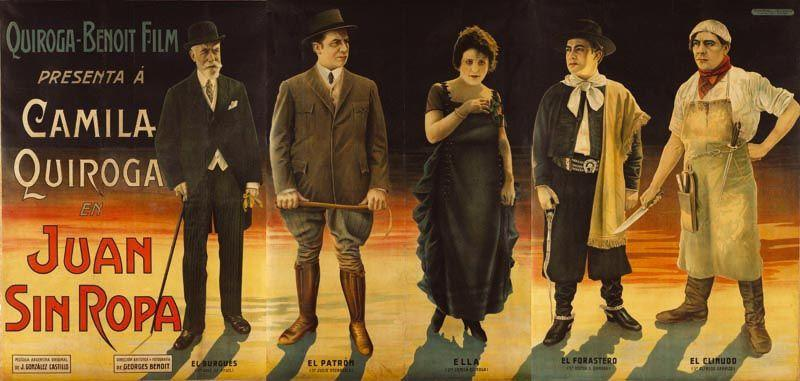
Poster for Juan Sin Ropa, 1919

- 1915 - Mariano Moreno y la Revolución de Mayo
- 1916 - Resaca
- 1919 - Juan Sin Ropa
- 1937 - Viento norte
- 1941 - 20 años y una noche

== Bibliography ==
- Hermosa, Claudio (2010). Camila Quiroga: Glorias en vísperas del olvido. Buenos Aires: Editorial De Los Cuatro Vientos. ISBN 978-987-08-0343-0.
