= Odio serrano =

1924 film

- Directed by: José A. Ferreyra
- Written by: José A. Ferreyra
- Produced by: Marcelo Corbicier
- Cinematography: Roque Funes
- Release date: 1924
- Country: Argentina
- Languages: Silent film Spanish intertitles

Odio serrano is a 1924 silent Argentine film directed and written by José A. Ferreyra. The film premiered in 1924 in Buenos Aires.

== Cast ==
- Nelo Cosimi
- Yolanda Labardén
- Héctor Míguez
- Antonio Prieto
