= Help Me to Live =

- Poster
- Directed by: José A. Ferreyra
- Written by: José A. Ferreyra; Libertad Lamarque
- Produced by: Alfredo P. Murúa
- Starring: Libertad Lamarque; Floren Delbene
- Cinematography: Gumer Barreiros
- Edited by: Daniel Spósito
- Music by: Cátulo Castillo; Alfredo Malerba; Atilio Supparo; José Vázquez Vigo
- Distributed by: Sociedad Impresora de Discos Eletrofónicos
- Release date: August 26, 1936 (Argentina)
- Running time: 76 min
- Country: Argentina
- Language: Spanish

Help Me to Live (Ayúdame a Vivir) is a 1936 Argentine musical melodrama film directed and written by José A. Ferreyra with Libertad Lamarque. Starring Libertad Lamarque and Santiago Gómez Cou, the film premiered on 26 August 1936 in Buenos Aires. A typical tango-based film of the Golden Age of Argentine cinema, its international success gave a great boost to the booming Argentine film industry.

== Main cast ==
- Libertad Lamarque as Luisita
- Floren Delbene as Julio
- Perla Mary as Mariluz
- Delia Durruty as Teresa
- Lalo Harbín as Federico
- Santiago Gómez Cou as Enrique
