= Bewitching Kisses =

Besos Brujos / Bewitching Kisses
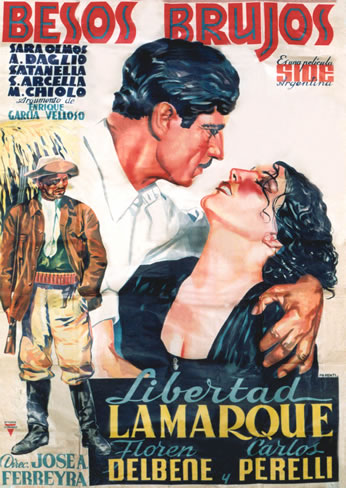
- Theatrical release poster
- Directed by: José A. Ferreyra
- Written by: José A. Ferreyra; Enrique García Velloso
- Produced by: Alfredo P. Murúa
- Cinematography: Gumer Barreiros
- Edited by: Emilio Murúa; Daniel Spósito
- Distributed by: Sociedad Impresora de Discos Eletrofónicos, Sociedad Impresora de Discos Eletrofónicos (SIDE)
- Release date: 30 June 1937
- Running time: 78 minutes
- Country: Argentina
- Language: Spanish

Bewitching Kisses (Spanish: Besos Brujos) is a 1937 Argentine romantic drama film musical of the Golden Age of Argentine cinema directed and written by José A. Ferreyra, based on a story by Enrique García Velloso. Starring Libertad Lamarque and Floren Delbene.

== Plot ==
The film tells the story of a singer estranged from her fiancé and abducted by an admirer to a backwoods hovel.
