= Puente Alsina (film) =

- Directed by: José A. Ferreyra
- Written by: José A. Ferreyra
- Produced by: Pedro Gonzalez
- Starring: José Gola; Miguel Gómez Bao
- Cinematography: Gumer Barreiros
- Edited by: Daniel Spósito
- Music by: César Gola
- Release date: 6 August 1935
- Running time: 82 minutes
- Country: Argentina
- Language: Spanish

Puente Alsina is a 1935 Argentine tango musical film directed and written by José A. Ferreyra. It premiered on 6 August 1935 in Buenos Aires, during the Golden Age of Argentine cinema.

== Plot ==
Lidia is a woman who recently rejected her boyfriend Alfredo's proposal to her. She then leaves and goes to a river afterward. While standing at the river, she falls in. Edmundo, one of Lidia's coworkers, rescues her from the water.

Edmundo takes Lidia to her house, as she is unconscious. Her boyfriend, Alfredo, begins worrying. Not knowing where she is, Alfredo hires a detective to locate Lidia.

== Main cast ==
- Miguel Gómez Bao
- Alberto Bello
- Pierina Dealessi
- José Gola
- José Mazilli
- Rafael Salvatore
- Delia Urruty

== Reception ==
The film was unsuccessful due to the plot and terribly written dialogue.
