= Streets of Buenos Aires =

1934 film by José A. Ferreyra

- Directed by: José A. Ferreyra
- Written by: José A. Ferreyra
- Produced by: José A. Ferreyra
- Cinematography: Alberto Etchebehere; Roque Funes
- Music by: Guillermo Casali
- Release date: 16 March 1934
- Running time: 58 minutes
- Country: Argentina
- Language: Spanish

Streets of Buenos Aires (Spanish:Calles de Buenos Aires) is a 1934 Argentine musical film written and directed by José A. Ferreyra during the Golden Age of Argentine cinema.

== Cast ==
- Nelly Ayllón
- Guillermo Casali
- Delia Elías
- Leonor Fernández
- Miguel Gómez Bao
- Enrique Mazza
- Mario Soffici
- Francisco Verding

== Bibliography ==
- Leslie Bethell. A Cultural History of Latin America: Literature, Music and the Visual Arts in the 19th and 20th Centuries. Cambridge University Press, 1998.
