= The Girl from Florida Street =

1922 film

La Chica de la calle Florida
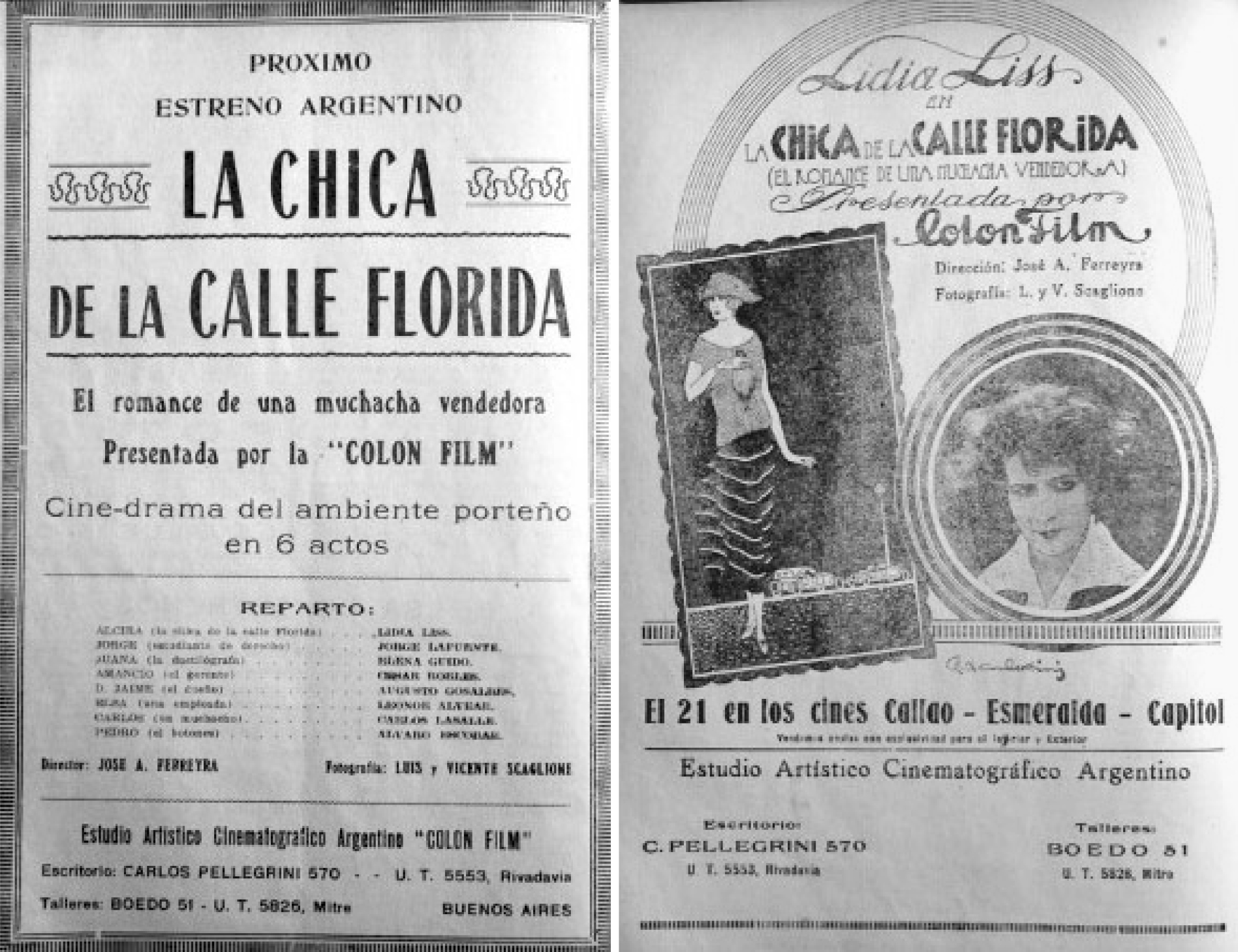
- Directed by: José A. Ferreyra
- Written by: José A. Ferreyra
- Starring: Álvaro Escobar; Elena Guido; Lidia Liss
- Cinematography: Luis Scaglione; Vicente Scaglione
- Release date: 1922
- Country: Argentina
- Languages: Silent film Spanish intertitles

The Girl from Florida Street (Spanish: La Chica de la calle Florida) is a 1922 Argentine silent film directed and written by José A. Ferreyra.

== Cast ==
- Leonor Alvear as Elsa, una empleada
- Álvaro Escobar as Pedro, el botones
- Augusto Gocalbes as Don Jaime, el dueño
- Elena Guido as Juana, la dactilógrafa
- Jorge Lafuente as Jorge, estudiante de derecho
- Carlos Lasalle as Carlos, un muchacho
- Lidia Liss as Alcira
- César Robles as Amancio, el gerente
