= Juan Sin Ropa =

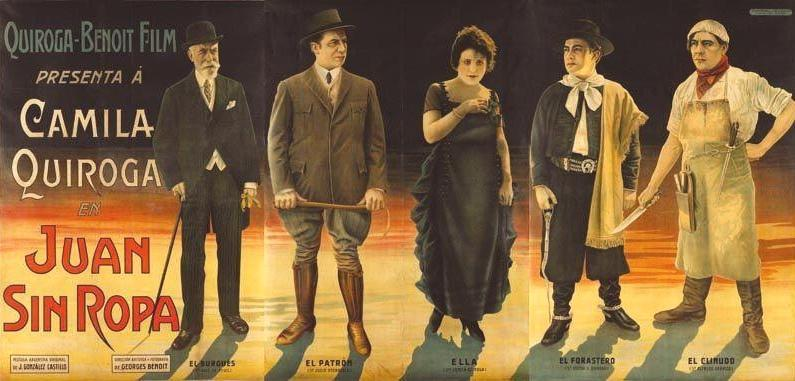
- Theatrical release poster
- Directed by: Georges Benoît
- Story by: José González Castillo
- Produced by: Héctor G. Quiroga; Georges Benoît
- Starring: Camila Quiroga; Héctor G. Quiroga; Julio Escarsela; José de Ángel; Alfredo Carrizo
- Cinematography: Georges Benoît
- Production company: Quiroga-Benoît Film
- Release date: June 3, 1919 (Buenos Aires)
- Running time: Unknown (6 acts)
- Country: Argentina
- Language: Silent (Spanish intertitles)

Juan Sin Ropa (lit. 'Juan Without Clothes') is a 1919 mostly lost Argentine silent melodrama film directed by Georges Benoît and starring Camila Quiroga, Héctor G. Quiroga, José de Ángel, Julio Escarsela and Alfredo Carrizo. It was produced during a brief flourishing period of silent films in Argentina in the second half of the 1910s, when the country became one of the most important producers in Latin American cinema and a leader in the Spanish-speaking world. In this context, Juan Sin Ropa was part of a trend that relied on considerable investment in renowned theatrical actors, successful playwrights and experienced foreign directors to produce a "quality cinema", comparable to the big U.S. productions but with national themes. It was the only film released by Quiroga-Benoît Film, a production company formed by Camila and Héctor G. Quiroga—a prestigious acting couple in Argentine theater—along with Benoît, a French photographer then active in the U.S. film industry.

The film had its commercial premiere in Buenos Aires on 3 June 1919 at the theaters Teatro Grand Splendid (today the iconic bookshop El Ateneo) and Teatro Palace, both of them owned by businessman Max Glücksmann. The film was also sold for its screening in other countries such as Chile, the United States, France and Spain, among others.

Juan Sin Ropa tells the story of Juan Ponce, a rural laborer who travels to the city and is employed in a meat-packing plant, where he later leads a strike that culminates in violent repression. As such, the film has been traditionally misidentified as a depiction of the Tragic Week (Spanish: Semana Trágica) of January 1919, a violent repression of workers' strikes in Buenos Aires during the presidency of Hipólito Yrigoyen that ended in the massacre of hundreds of people. However, film historian Héctor Kohen found in 1994 that Juan Sin Ropa was finished before the onset of the Tragic Week, so the film could not have been inspired by the events.

Juan Sin Ropa is regarded as one of the most important films of the silent period of Argentine cinema.

== Plot ==
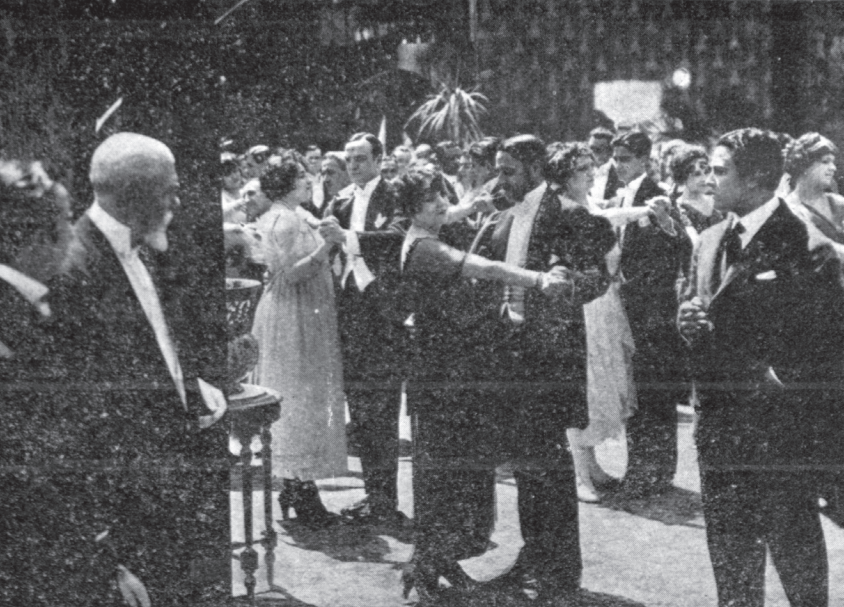
Image of a lost scene from the film, showing Juan (right) attending a party with the family of his former employer, Alvarado (left), with his daughter Elena in the center and her brother Oscar behind.

Juan Ponce, a young farmhand, finds work at a meatpacking plant and, through hard work and determination, rises through the ranks to become a leader among the workers. During a period of labor unrest, he actively participates in a strike, but his involvement puts him in grave danger. At a critical moment, he manages to escape thanks to Elena, a young woman who rescues him in her car. Elena turns out to be the daughter of the meatpacking plant's owner, and she recognizes Juan's potential, believing he could become a man of great value.

Determined to change his path, Juan leaves the city and returns to the countryside, where he dedicates himself to farming. Over time, he becomes a respected and influential farmer. It is then that he faces a new challenge: fighting against speculators who drive up grain prices, harming both farmers and the general population.

Meanwhile, Elena, the woman who once helped him, has married Aldunate, a powerful and authoritarian grain merchant and landowner. Her marriage becomes a nightmare as Aldunate subjects her to a despotic and oppressive life. When Juan learns of Elena's plight, he decides to confront Aldunate, not only to defend the exploited farmers but also to free Elena from her suffering.

Juan's struggle becomes even more complicated when Oscar, Elena's brother, conspires with two criminals to seize the farmers’ lands. Juan manages to thwart their plans, once again proving his integrity and courage.

After Aldunate's death, Elena is left widowed, and Juan can finally fulfill his dream of happiness with her. His perseverance, honesty, and fight for justice are rewarded not only with Elena's love but also with the respect and admiration of his community.

== Cast ==
Cast and roles adapted from the researches of Héctor Rodolfo Kohen (1994) and Lucio Mafud (2016).

- Camila Quiroga as Elena, daughter of Alvarado
- Héctor Quiroga as Juan Ponce, symbol of work
- Julio Escarsela as Aldunate, a rich landowner
- José de Ángel as Alvarado, owner of the meat-packing plant
- Alfredo Carrizo as "El Clinudo", a rebel worker
- Carlos Bouhier as Oscar, brother of Elena
- Santos Casabal as Benítez, friend of Oscar
- Haydée Passera as Aldunate's young daughter
- José Rubens as Don Pietro Bonomi, a chacarero
- María Rando as María, daughter of Bonomi
- Ángel Cuartucci as "El Tuerto", friend of "El Clinudo"
- Livia Zapata in an unknown role
- Margarita Lawson in an unknown role

== Style and themes ==
Through its title, the film is associated with the legend of Santos Vega, a mythical gaucho hero who is defeated by a diabolic being called Juan Sin Ropa in a payada song duel. While the original Juan Sin Ropa character "represents the onset of a modern Argentina in which the state's sovereignty over its territory spells the end of the gaucho's way of life", the Juan Sin Ropa film "shifts the signifier of modernity away from the mysterious supernatural character onto a gaucho protagonist who, unlike Santos Vega's passing into history, is able to successfully negotiate the transition from a traditional rural economy to the urban industrial economy." As noted by hispanist Matt Losada:

The original story's social Darwinism—shared by [Leopoldo] Lugones, who considers the gaucho unfit for a modern rationalized economy and thus destined to be replaced by the criollo elite—is neutralized as Juan Sin Ropa's protagonist manages to refashion himself for success in the new capitalist economy. In my reading, this new lineage is less important as an attempt to redeem the already disappeared gaucho than as a transference of his symbolic capital (as authentically Argentine) to the recently disembarked proletariat.

== Background and production ==
Juan Sin Ropa was produced and released during the pinnacle of silent film production in Argentina, a "golden age" in which the country began to "lead in the production of Spanish-language silent films, with more than 100 feature films being made from 1915 to 1924, equal to the combined total of films made in Mexico and Spain." The film was the only production by Quiroga-Benoît Film, a production company formed by Camila and Héctor Quiroga—a prestigious acting couple—along with French photographer Georges Benoît. Its filming galleries were located in the barrio of Boedo.

On July 17, 1918, the shooting of exterior scenes began and, following several interruptions caused by the theater commitments of some cast members, the production was finally completed in early December. The state of the film's shooting was sustainedly reported with advertisements by Quiroga-Benoît Film in the specialized magazine La Película, published from October to December of that year.

== Release and reception ==
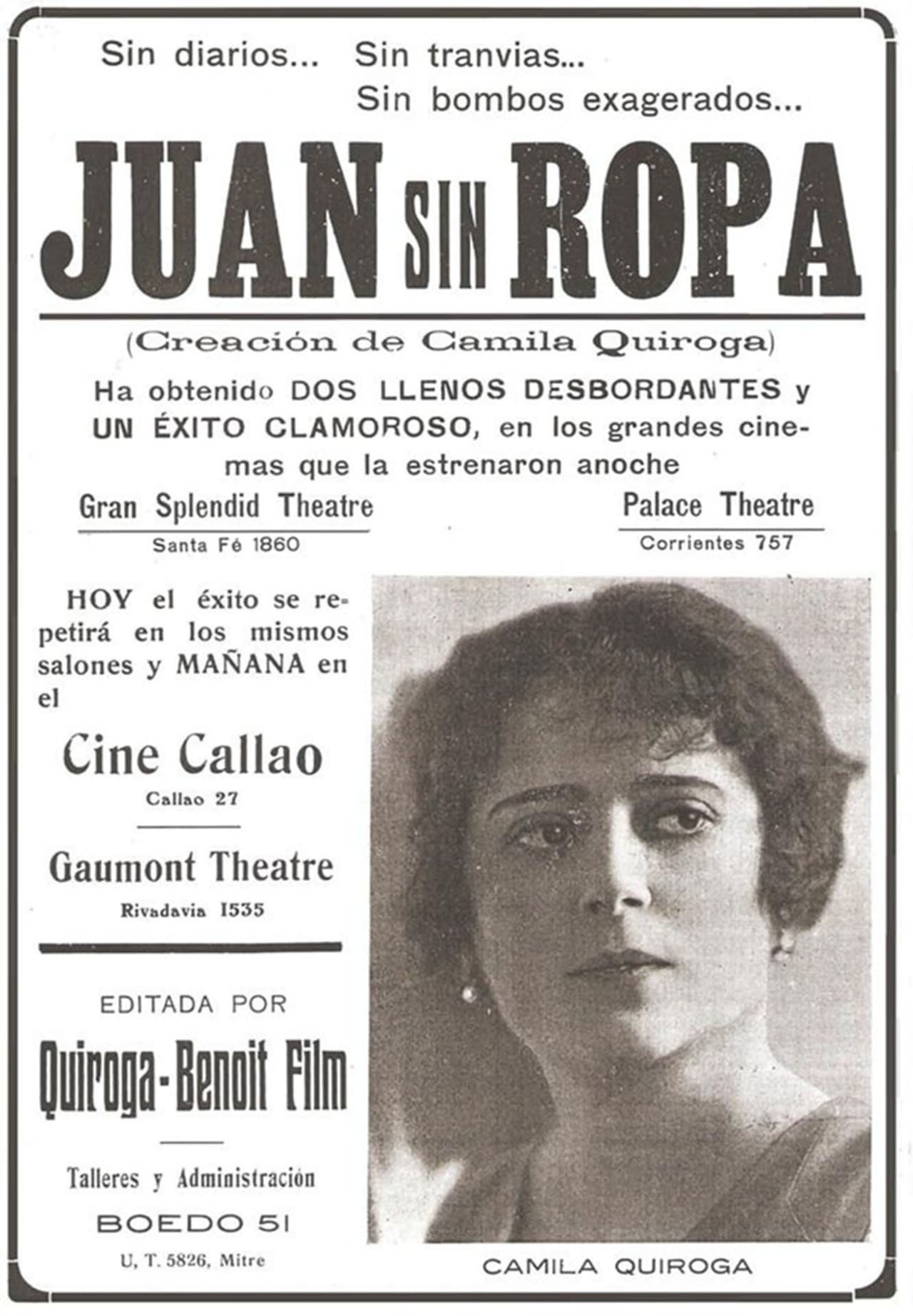
Advertisement of the film featuring Camila Quiroga, published the day after its premiere in Buenos Aires.

The private presentation of the film in Buenos Aires was originally set to take place on 2 January 1919, although it was later postponed to 8 January. However, the events of the Tragic Week forced to cancel the function.

Likely owing to its blend of novel American techniques and a timely, popular theme, the film became one of the greatest audience successes of Argentine silent cinema, being screened 800 consecutive times in Buenos Aires alone during the year of its premiere.

The film was also well received by the Argentine press. The reviewer for the trade magazine Excelsior wrote: "Confident framing; backlighting techniques; surprising effects and scenes where the characters are strikingly vivid. There is a sunset that is pure poetry. Benoît has captured, in various twilight nuances, the intense poetry of the pampas." The also specialized magazine La Película praised the film's portrayal of rural life and work, as well as its inclusion of Argentine traditions, the educational value of its scenes showing factory work, and its depiction of social class contrasts, with the review noting that "scenes of tango in low-life cabarets" are set against a "dance with its splendid party at a luxurious family reception, rich in mise-en-scène."

In August 1919, following the film's release, Benoît announced his return to the United States, where he resumed his job as a cameraman in Hollywood.

== Legacy and conservation ==
The only print of the film known to exist is in fragments and without intertitles, only lasting 27 minutes.

The theatrical release poster of the film has been conserved and is at permanent exhibition of the Museo del Cine Pablo Ducrós Hicken in Buenos Aires, which carried out an extensive restoration in 2021. Considered a reflection of the film's ambitious production, the poster is 3 times larger than a traditional one, measuring 140 centimetres (4 ft 7 in) high by 290 centimetres (9 ft 6 in) wide and being formed by 3 separated units.

According to Lucio Mafud, Juan Sin Ropa was "perhaps the best film of the [Argentine] silent period."

In 1959, influential film historian Domingo Di Núbila described it as the "first Argentine film that sided with the proletariat with total combativeness and that, in the world order, is much earlier than what can be called a social movement within cinema."

Writing in 2012, Fernando Martín Peña described Juan Sin Ropa as a "surprising film due to the modernity of its mise-en-scène, the expressive use of its close-ups and the dynamism of its editing, which anticipates later European avant-garde experiences, such as those of Abel Gance. The British historian Kevin Brownlow went so far as to affirm that the formal resolution of the strike sequence seems to him far superior to the similar scene that can be seen at the beginning of Intolerance."

== See also ==
- List of Argentine films before 1930
- List of films dealing with anarchism
- List of incomplete or partially lost films

== Bibliography ==
- Mafud, Lucio (2016). La imagen ausente. El cine mudo argentino en publicaciones gráficas. Catálogo. El cine de ficción (1914-1923). Investigaciones de la Biblioteca Nacional (in Spanish). Buenos Aires: Biblioteca Nacional; Editorial Teseo. ISBN 978-987-723-096-3.
- Rist, Peter H. (2014). Historical Dictionary of South American Cinema. Rowman & Littlefield. ISBN 978-081-088-036-8 – via Google Books.
