= Corazón de criolla =

1923 film

- Directed by: José A. Ferreyra
- Written by: José A. Ferreyra
- Produced by: Juan Glize
- Starring: Elena Guido; Gloria Grat
- Cinematography: Luis Scaglione; Vicente Scaglione
- Release date: 1923
- Country: Argentina
- Languages: Silent film Spanish intertitles

Corazón de criolla (English language: Heart of Criole) is a 1923 silent Argentine film directed and written by José A. Ferreyra.

== Cast ==
- Gloria Grat
- Elena Guido as Rosa
- Yolanda Labardén as Magna
- Jorge Lafuente as Juan Carlos
- César Robles
