= Escándalo de medianoche =

1923 film

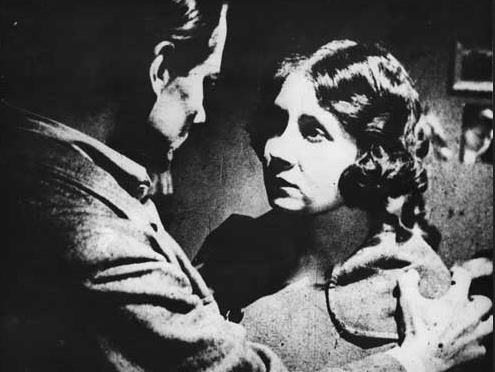
- Felipe Farah and Amelia Mirel
- Directed by: Roberto Guidi
- Starring: Felipe Farah; Amelia Mirel; José Pla
- Release date: 1923
- Country: Argentina
- Language: Spanish

Escándalo de medianoche is a 1923 Argentine black and white silent film. The film is starred by Felipe Farah, Amelia Mirel and José Pla

Escándalo de medianoche is based on El sombrero de tres picos, work of Pedro Antonio de Alarcón.
