= La bandera Argentina =

La Bandera Argentina
- Directed by: Eugene Py
- Release date: 1897
- Running time: 3 minutes
- Country: Argentina
- Language: Silent film

La Bandera Argentina (in English: 'the Argentine flag') was for a time considered the first film ever produced in the cinema of Argentina. It was directed by French-Argentine cinema pioneer Eugene Py in 1897 in which he captured the flag of Argentina in 1897.

The film - which was screened in 1897 - was actually fourth or fifth to three short recorded images of the city of Buenos Aires (filmed by German Federico Figner in 1896) known as Vistas de Palermo, Avenida de Mayo and Plaza de Mayo. The film is usually presented as the country's first film because of its title and patriotic significance, even though Figner's shorts are clearly dated as being screened on 24 November 1896 (the first film to ever be screened on the country was a Lumière production, July the 18th of the same year). Both Py's and Figner's films are nowadays lost.

The film has a major historical significance for film history in Argentina, and was produced as a result of French immigrants in Buenos Aires, including Py whose colleague imported the first photographic cinema equipment into Argentina in late 1896.
