= La Maleva =

1923 film

- Directed by: José A. Ferreyra
- Written by: José A. Ferreyra
- Produced by: Juan Glize
- Starring: Álvaro Escobar; Gloria Grat
- Cinematography: Luis Scaglione; Vicente Scaglione
- Release date: 1923
- Country: Argentina
- Languages: Silent film Spanish intertitles

La Maleva is a 1923 silent Argentine film directed and written by José A. Ferreyra.

== Cast ==
- Álvaro Escobar
- Gloria Grat
- Elena Guido
- Yolanda Labardén
- Jorge Lafuente
- José Plá
- César Robles
