= Floren Delbene =

Argentine actor

- Born: 1898; Buenos Aires, Argentina
- Died: 1978 (aged 79–80); Buenos Aires, Argentina
- Other name: Florentino Delbene
- Occupation: Actor
- Years active: 1926–1974 (film)

Floren Delbene (1898 – 1978 in Buenos Aires) was an Argentine film actor and writer of the Golden Age of Argentine Cinema.

Delbene began acting for film in 1926 and made some 60 film appearances between then and his retirement in 1969, appearing in films such as Amalia and Ayúdame a Vivir in 1936 and Besos Brujos, often working alongside Libertad Lamarque. He was one of the leading Argentine actors of the 1930s and 1940s, playing the classic tall, dark and handsome leading gentleman in film.

== Selected filmography ==
- Amalia (1936)
- Ayúdame a Vivir (1936)
- Santos Vega (1936)
- Besos Brujos (1937)
- Paths of Faith (1938)
- Ambition (1939)
- An Evening of Love (1943)
- The Three Rats (1946)
- La senda oscura (1947)
- Juan Moreira (1948)
- Dance of Fire (1949)
- The Age of Love (1954)
