= Eugène Py =

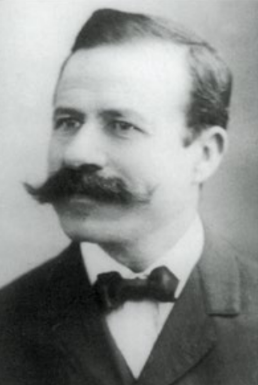
- Eugène Py c. 1890–1910
- Born: 19 May 1859; Carcassonne, France
- Died: 26 August 1924 (aged 65); San Martín, Argentina
- Other names: Eugenio Py
- Occupation: Filmmaker
- Known for: Being a pioneer in Argentine cinema
- Notable work: La bandera Argentina (1897)

Eugène Py (19 May 1859 – 26 August 1924), Hispanized as Eugenio Py, was a French-born Argentine cameraman, cinematographer and film director. Py is widely considered the founding pioneer of the cinema of Argentina.

== Life and career ==
Born in Carcassonne, Py moved to Buenos Aires in the late 1880s.

Py's early films included Visita del Dr Campos Salles a Buenos Aires (1900) (the first Argentine documentary), and La Revista de la Escuadra Argentina and Visita del general Mitre al Museo Históric (1901). Py introduced the concept of recording history in the making in Argentina, by filming the arrival of the Brazilian president at the time accompanied by the Argentine president, and filming Alberto Santos-Dumont during a small recording that went on to capture what is probably the first "gag" in the country's history (a third man kept standing between Py and Dumont, interrupting the film, until he received a spit in the face, upon which recording finished).

Py was one of the Lumière brothers' "operators".

He died in 1924 in San Martín, Buenos Aires.
