= Legend of the Inca Bridge =

1923 film

Leyenda del puente inca
- Directed by: José A. Ferreyra
- Written by: José A. Ferreyra
- Produced by: Marcelo Corbicier
- Cinematography: Roque Funes
- Release date: November 1923
- Country: Argentina
- Languages: Silent film Spanish intertitles

Leyenda del puente inca (English language: Legend of the Inca Bridge) is a 1923 silent Argentine film directed and written by José A. Ferreyra. The film premiered in November 1923 in Buenos Aires.

== Cast ==
- Nelo Cosimi as Incano
- Amelia Mirel as María Rosa
- Yolanda Labardén as Mavelina
- Héctor Míguez as Raimundo
