= Palomas rubias =

1920 film

- English: Blond Doves
- Directed by: José A. Ferreyra
- Written by: Leopoldo Torres Ríos
- Produced by: Italo Fattori
- Starring: María Clais; Modesto Insúa; Jorge Lafuente; Lidia Liss; Enrique Parigi; José Plá; Rodolfo Vismara
- Cinematography: Carlos Torres Ríos
- Release date: August 18, 1920 (Argentina)
- Country: Argentina

Palomas rubias (English language:Blond Doves) is a 1920 Argentine romantic comedy film directed and written by José A. Ferreyra with Leopoldo Torres Ríos. The film premiered in Argentina on 18 August 1920.

== Cast ==
- María Clais
- Modesto Insúa as Marcelo Agudo
- Jorge Lafuente as Carlos Roig
- Lidia Liss as Elena Carter
- Enrique Parigi as Héctor Carter
- José Plá as El Cuervo
- Rodolfo Vismara as Roberto Recto
