= La Muchacha del arrabal =

1922 film by Jose Ferreyra

- Directed by: José A. Ferreyra
- Written by: José A. Ferreyra; Leopoldo Torres Ríos
- Starring: Elena Guido
- Cinematography: Luis Scaglione
- Music by: Roberto Firpo
- Release date: 1922
- Country: Argentina
- Languages: Silent film Spanish intertitles

La Muchacha del arrabal is a 1922 Argentine silent film directed and written by José A. Ferreyra with Leopoldo Torres Ríos.

== Cast ==
- Angel Boyano
- Carlos Dux
- Elena Guido
- Carlos Lasalle
- Lidia Liss
