= The Law They Forgot =

La ley que olvidaron
- Directed by: José A. Ferreyra
- Release date: 1938
- Running time: 77 minute
- Country: Argentina
- Language: Spanish

The Law They Forgot (Spanish: La ley que olvidaron) is a 1938 Argentine musical melodrama film directed by José A. Ferreyra during the Golden Age of Argentine cinema. The film premiered in Buenos Aires.
