= Perdón, viejita =

1927 film

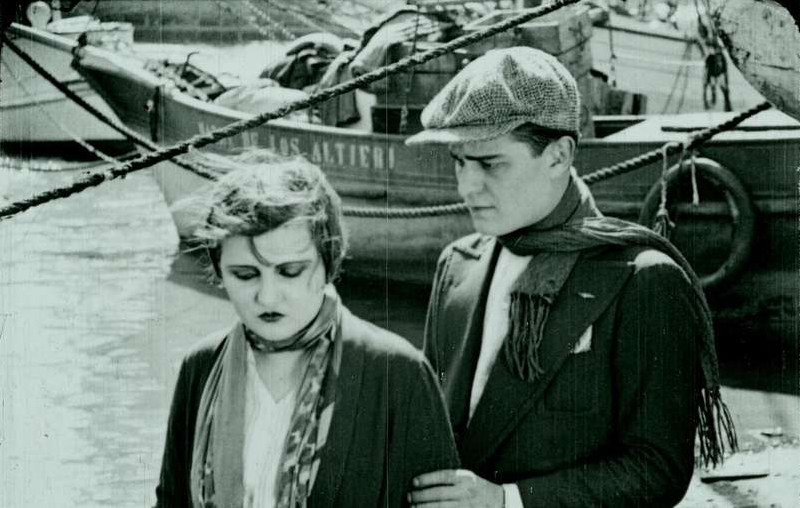
- María Turgenova and Ermete Meliante in a frame from the film
- Directed by: José A. Ferreyra
- Written by: José A. Ferreyra
- Starring: Álvaro Escobar; Stella Maris
- Release date: 1927
- Running time: 30 minutes
- Country: Argentina
- Languages: Silent film Spanish intertitles

Perdón, viejita is a 1927 silent Argentine film directed and written by José A. Ferreyra. Ferreyra was born on 28 August 1889 in Buenos Aires, Argentina. He was a director and writer also known for Bewitching Kisses (1937) and La vuelta al Bulín (1926). Ferreyra died on 29 January 1943, at age 53. A fragment (34-minutes) of the film is currently available on YouTube. The restored version will be presented in the San Isidro Film and Music Festival on 15 November. 2016. The nitrate copy of the film was provided by the Fundación Cinemateca Argentina and the restoration work was done by GOTIKA,

== Synopsis ==
Perdón, viejita (which means "Sorry, Old Woman" in English) revolves around a lower-class family: Doña Camila, the aging mother, and Elena and Carlos, her children. Carlos is, unbeknownst to her, a reformed thief. One day he meets Nora, a prostitute, in the park, and decides to bring her home after falling in love with her. Elena, who is being courted by a shady Don Juan, is given a ring as a gift, but Nora takes it away from her complaining that she knows men like Don Juan and the ring is probably stolen. This is evidenced when the police arrive in search for the ring, and Nora takes the fall for Elena.

Prudencio, Elena's other pretender, takes an interest in Don Juan and after following him forces him to accompany him to the police and confess about the stolen ring. Don Juan is then imprisoned and Nora let go, but she feels her honor has been tainted and her meddling has caused trouble to the family, so she leaves and goes back to her job under the wing of El Gavilán ("The Hawker"). Carlos follows suit, and confronts El Gavilán, who in the confrontation wounds Nora from gunshot.

In the epilogue, Nora recovers in bed, nursed by Carlos and Prudencio. Elena, who had confessed to accepting the ring from Don Juan to her mother, comes visit with Doña Camila, who apologizes for her mistrust and scorn of Nora. The family reconciles, and live happily ever after.
