= Melenita de oro =

1923 film

- Directed by: José A. Ferreyra
- Written by: José A. Ferreyra
- Produced by: Juan Glize
- Starring: Álvaro Escobar
- Cinematography: Luis Scaglione; Vicente Scaglione
- Music by: Carlos Vicente Geroni Flores
- Release date: 4 June 1923
- Country: Argentina
- Languages: Silent film Spanish intertitles

Melenita de oro (English language: Hair of Gold) is a 1923 silent Argentine film directed and written by José A. Ferreyra. The film premiered on 4 June 1923 in Buenos Aires.

== Cast ==
- Álvaro Escobar
- Jorge Lafuente
- Lidia Liss
- José Plá
