= La Gaucha =

1920 film

- Directed by: José A. Ferreyra
- Written by: José A. Ferreyra
- Starring: Álvaro Escobar; Elena Guido
- Release date: 27 April 1920
- Country: Argentina
- Languages: Silent film Spanish intertitles

La Gaucha is a 1920 Argentine silent film directed and written by José A. Ferreyra with Leopoldo Torres Ríos. The film premiered in Argentina on 27 April 1920.

== Cast ==
- Álvaro Escobar as Lamento, el trovador del pago
- Elena Guido as Justiniana, la malquerida
- Rosa Guido as Juanita, la ardilla
- María Halm as another victim
- Jorge Lafuente as José María, el peón de campo
- Lidia Liss as Marga, la gaucha
- Antonio Magatón as Don Braulio, tata viejo
- Yolanda de Maintenon as Judith, la víctima
- Enrique Parigi as Ernesto Valvi, el hijo del patrón
- Eduardo Leal Pizano as Jorgito, el impecable
- José Plá as Don Pablo, el capataz
- Elsa Rey .... Rosita, la hija del capataz
- Armando René Sentous .... Juancho, el buen muchacho
