= Buenos Aires, Ciudad de Ensueño =

1922 film

Buenos Aires, ciudad de ensueño
- Directed by: José A. Ferreyra
- Written by: José A. Ferreyra
- Starring: María E. Castro; Carlos Dux
- Release date: 26 September 1922
- Country: Argentina
- Languages: Silent film Spanish intertitles

Buenos Aires, ciudad de ensueño (English language:Buenos Aires, City of Dreams) is a 1922 Argentine musical film directed and written by José A. Ferreyra. The film premiered in Argentina on 26 September 1922.

It is a tango-based film, one of many directed by José A. Ferreyra.

== Cast ==
- María E. Castro as Rosa Juana, la soñadora
- Carlos Dux as Demetrio
- Elena Guido as Lina, la sacrificada
- Jorge Lafuente as Juan de Dios, el campesino
- Carlos Lasalle as Alberto, el patoterito
- Lidia Liss as Magdalena
- Enrique Parigi as Enrique, el de la ciudad
- Elsa Rey as Elsa, la campesina
