= José A. Ferreyra =

Argentine film director, screenwriter and film producer

José A. Ferreyra

José A(gustín) Ferreyra (28 August 1889 – 29 January 1943), popularly known as "Negro Ferreyra" (Black Ferreyra, due to his partially African ancestry), was an early Argentine film director, screenwriter and film producer. He was also sometimes credited as production designer.

Ferreyra was one of the most notable directors of the silent period of Argentine cinema, and later became an influence and also a participant of the Golden Age of Argentine cinema, famous for his melodramas with a strong tango content.

Ferreyra was born in Vicente López, Gran Buenos Aires. His father was of White European descent, while his mother was Afro-Argentine, likely descended from slaves.

He began simultaneously directing and screenwriting for film in 1915, and moved on to success directing films such as Palomas rubias in 1920. His films tended to focus on lower-class family drama, most notably Perdón, viejita (1927), and were filmed on a low budget and with little to no script as a guide. Ferreyra prevailed through the 1920s and 1930s as a distinguished filmmaker of the masses, but was displaced in the late 1930s and early 1940s by big budget cinema. He directed over 40 films and wrote the scripts for the majority of them between 1915 and 1941, working with noted actors such as Libertad Lamarque and Mario Soffici on his screen debut, before moving on to directing.

He died on 29 January 1943 from laryngeal cancer.

== Filmography ==
- Chimbela (1939)
- La Ley que olvidaron (1938)
- Besos Brujos (1937)
- Ayúdame a Vivir (1936)
- Puente Alsina (1935)
- Streets of Buenos Aires (1934)
- El Cantar de mi ciudad (1930)
- Perdón, viejita (1927)
- Muchachita de Chiclana (1926)
- La costurerita que dio aquel mal paso (1926)
- La vuelta al Bulín (1926)
- Mi último tango (1925)
- El organito de la tarde (1925)
- El arriero de Yacanto (1924)
- Mientras Buenos Aires duerme (1924)
- Odio serrano (1924)
- La Leyenda del puente inca (1923)
- Melenita de oro (1923)
- Corazón de criolla (1923)
- La Maleva (1923)
- La Chica de la calle Florida (1922)
- La Muchacha del arrabal (1922)
- Buenos Aires, ciudad de ensueño (1922)
- La Gaucha (1921)
- Palomas rubias (1920)
- De vuelta al pago (1919)
- Campo ajuera (1919)
- El tango de la muerte (1917)
- Venganza gaucha (1917)
- La fuga de Raquel (1916)
- La isla misteriosa (1916)
- Una noche de garufa (1915)
