= Cinema of Argentina =

- No. of screens: 978 (2017)
- Main distributors: United International Pictures 23.7% The Walt Disney Company 22.4% Warner Bros. 16.2%

Produced feature films (2023)
- Total: 235

Number of admissions (2023)
- Total: 44,447,934
- National films: 3,267,857 (7.3%)

Gross box office (2023)
- Total: ARS 53.8 billion
- National films: ARS 4.83 billion (8.9%)

The cinema of Argentina has historically been among the most developed in Latin America and one of the most recognized and influential in the Spanish-speaking world. What is known as Argentine cinema is often equated to the cinema of Buenos Aires, as the city and its metropolitan area have historically concentrated the majority of film production, although in every era there have been more or less isolated cinematic experiences outside the capital. Throughout the 20th century, film production in Argentina, supported by the State and by the work of a long list of directors and actors, became one of the major film industries in the Spanish-speaking world. The Golden Age of Argentine cinema took place between the 1930s and 1950s.

Argentina holds the record for the most Academy Awards for Best International Feature Film in Latin America, with two wins: The Official Story (1985) and The Secret in Their Eyes (2009); and has had a total of 8 nominations, making it the most recognized Latin American country in this category. Additionally, Argentina has won 19 Goya Awards for Best Ibero-American Film, more than any other country. In Sight and Sound's Greatest Films of All Time 2022, Lucrecia Martel's La Ciénaga (2001) was the highest-placed Latin American film and the only one to appear in the directors' top 100, appearing in 62nd place.

== History ==
=== 1894–1914: Pioneering years ===
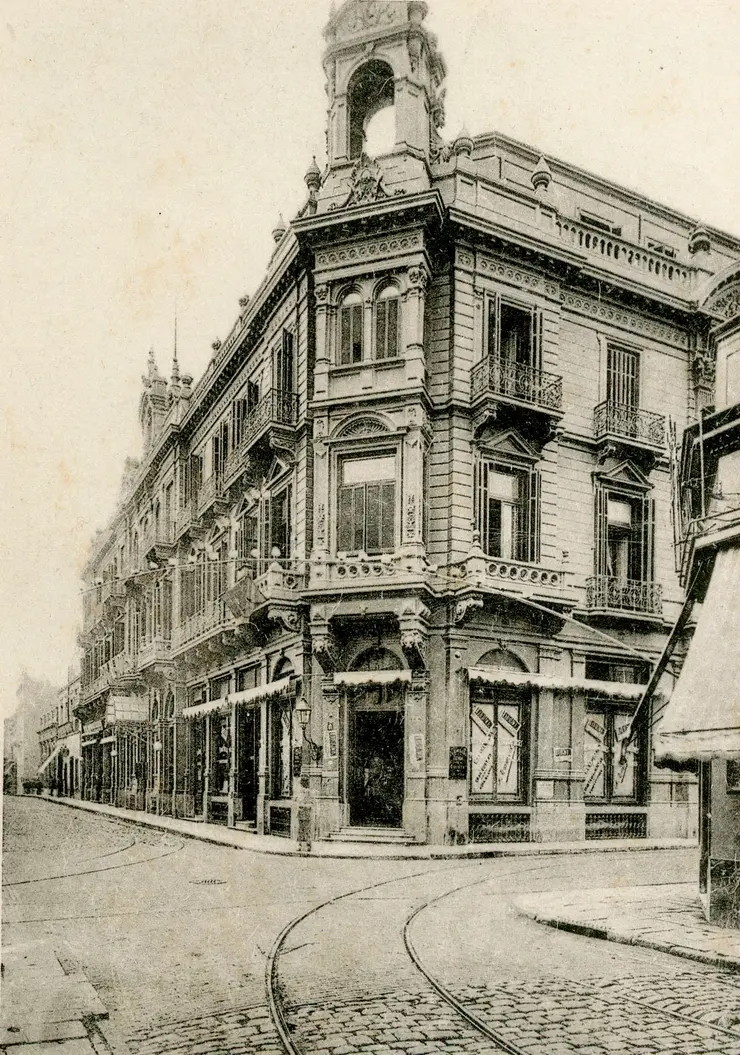
View of the Teatro Odeón c. 1900, where the cinematograph was presented for the first time in 1896.

Argentine cinema is almost as old as cinema in the world. The first early motion pictures introduced to Buenos Aires were Thomas Edison's kinetoscopes, which were brought by Czech businessman Frederico Figner and presented on 18 September 1894—a few months after its first ever exhibition in New York City—in a special press screening. Although they consisted of small, single-view tapes, the kinetoscopes familiarized the local press and the general public with the concept of moving pictures, and the device came to be used as a parameter for all technical explanations regarding cinema. True film projections were only possible thanks to the Lumière brothers' cinematograph, with which a series of presentations were made on 28 July 1896 at the Teatro Odeón.

In 1897, the first projectors and cameras—from the Lumière and Gaumont firms—reached the country through Enrique Lepage's photography store, Casa Lepage. Their technician, the French Eugenio Py, became the first person to systematically film in Argentina; he shot the 1897 short La bandera argentina, a register of the national flag which is generally considered the country's first film. Other authors consider that the first films belong to Frederico Figner, who shot different views with a vitascope in 1896, aided by the camarographer José Steimberg. In addition to Lepage and Py, the third figure who dominated film production at this time was the Austrian Max Glücksmann, who was initially an employee of Casa Lepage and later acquired the firm in 1908. The works of these early years of Argentine cinema correspond to actuality films. As noted by historian José Agustín Mahieu, this stage of national cinema "naively discovers the magic of movement, the direct capture of the landscape, of the event. The camera is still a primary eye planted in front of the facts. Over any other concern (artistic or cultural) prevails the technical curiosity, the exploration of a tool that is just beginning to be known." Thus, a small-scale commercial exploitation began, with the Casa Lepage offering projectors and films to restaurants, cafes or other entertainment venues. The company dominated the country's film production for a decade, dedicating to filming curiositites and current events such as official state visits, festivities and tourist sights. In 1900, the first movie theater, the Salón Nacional, was inaugurated, and soon more venues dedicated to the projection of films were opened.

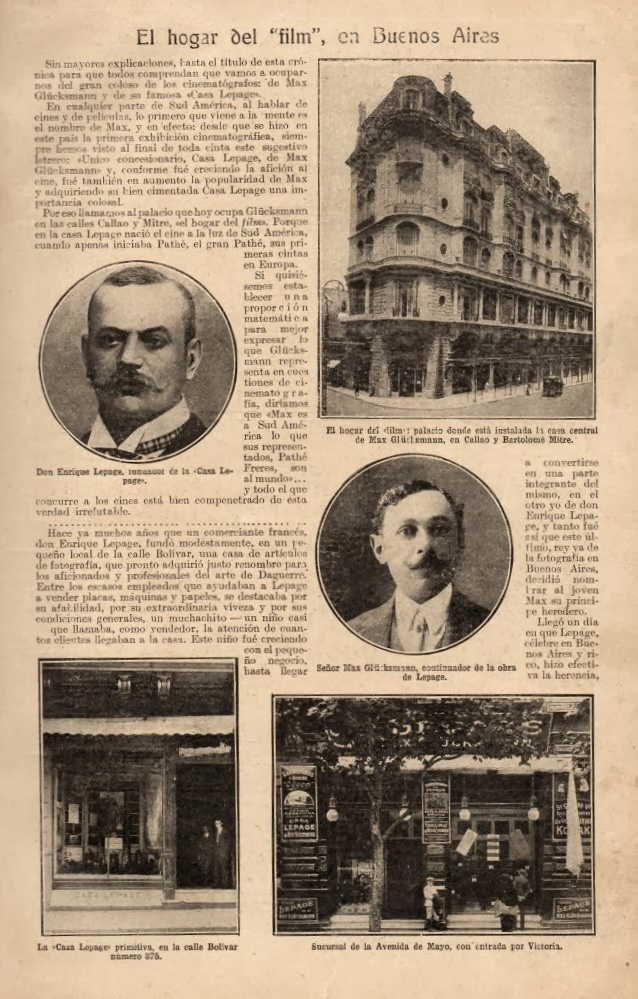
An article published in 1914 in the magazine Caras y Caretas about Max Glücksmann and the Casa Lepage.

Although the topic has been little explored by Argentine film historiography, the country notably emerged as possibly the first major center for the production of pornographic films worldwide in the early 20th century. While pornographic cinema is generally considered to have originated in France alongside the birth of the medium, Buenos Aires became a hub for clandestine stag films, also known as "smokers". Around 1905, the French companies Pathé and Gaumont are reported to have shifted part of their production to Argentina in order to circumvent censorship in France. According to David Kerekes and David Slater, the red-light district of Buenos Aires at the time hosted the filming, projection and export of some of the earliest pornographic films, which were distributed to private buyers abroad. These productions were not intended for local or popular audiences but were marketed as a form of "sophisticated entertainment for the enjoyment of the wealthy classes of the Old Continent". Film historians Arthur Knight and Hollis Alpert noted that hardcore stag films were shipped by boat from Argentina to private clients, mainly in France and England, but also in Russia and the Balkans. Biographer Louis Sheaffer, in his account of Eugene O'Neill's life, mentions that the playwright traveled to Buenos Aires during this period and frequented pornographic screening rooms in the Barracas neighborhood. The Argentine film El Sartorio (sometimes referred to as El Satario) is often cited as the earliest surviving pornographic film. Believed to have been shot between 1907 and 1912 on the banks of the Río de la Plata in Quilmes or along the Paraná River near Rosario, it depicts six nude nymphs surprised by a satyr or faun who captures one and engages in sexual acts, including the 69 position. A copy of El Sartorio is preserved at the Kinsey Institute, which holds the world's largest collection of stag films.

At the end of the 1900s, the incipient Argentine cinema made significant progress with the appearance of the first narrative films, which encouraged production and distribution. These were the work of the Italian Mario Gallo, who had arrived in Buenos Aires a few years before as part of an opera company. There is confusion as to which was the first narrative film in the country: those who date its release in 1908 consider it to be El fusilamiento de Dorrego, while more recent researchers point out that this film is actually from 1910 and the first one was really La Revolución de Mayo, released in 1909. For this reason, 23 May is considered National Film Day in the country, in commemoration of the release date of the latter film. In the manner of the French film d'art trend, Gallo's films were closer to photographed theatre, almost always on historical topics.

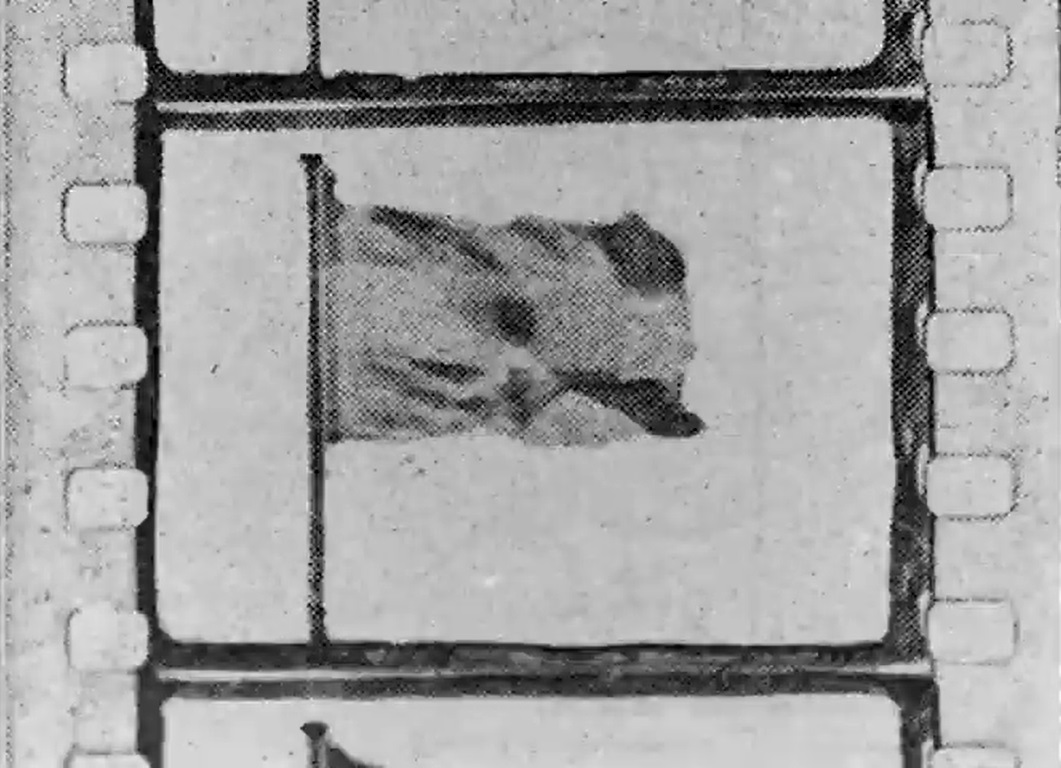
A frame of the Eugenio Py's La bandera Argentina (1897), long considered the first Argentine film in history.

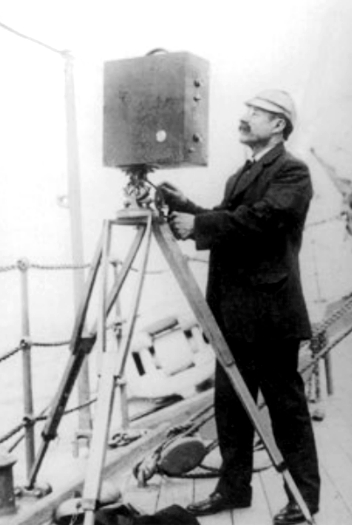
French immigrant Eugenio Py is generally considered to have made the first films of the country in the 1890s.

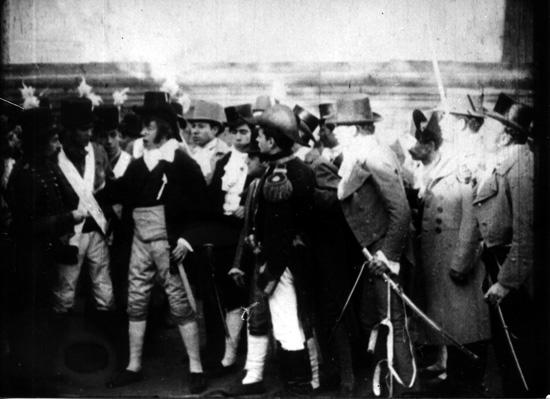
A frame from Mario Gallo's La Revolución de Mayo (1909), regarded as the first narrative film of the country.

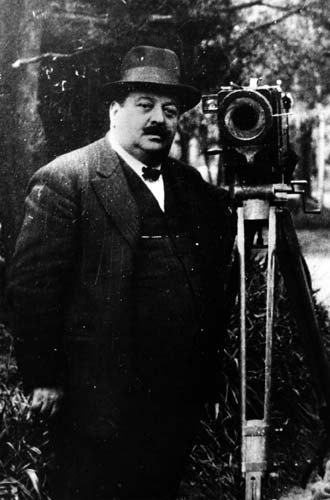
Portrait of Mario Gallo.

=== 1914–1920: Peak and decline of the silent era ===
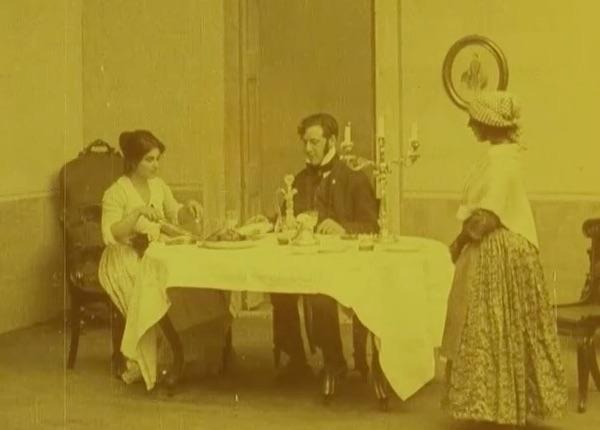
A tinted scene from Amalia (1914), a film financed by and starring members of Buenos Aires high society that offered new prospects of prestige and economic success to Argentine cinema.

The 1914 release of the film Amalia—based on the novel of the same name by José Mármol—was highly influential and marked a milestone in the development of Argentine cinema. The film's premiere on 12 December 1914 was an unprecedented event for national filmmaking, as it took place at the Teatro Colón, the most prestigious venue for the high society and aristocracy of Buenos Aires, with the presence of President Victorino de la Plaza and his ministers. Amalia was produced by Glücksmann, directed by playwright Enrique García Velloso and photographed by Py, shot in a very similar style to Gallo's films. The film was an initiative of the charity society Asociación del Divino Rostro, and its premiere was held with the "stated purpose of raising funds for the construction of a chapel and a school for girls." The characters were played by a long list of members of Buenos Aires' high society, presented in what Peña called "one of the longest title sequences in the entire history of cinema." Described as a "self-celebration show" for Buenos Aires' high society, the premiere of Amalia featured an unusually expensive ticket for a film screening and was accompanied by the Teatro Colón's orchestra. Contrary to popular belief, Amalia was not Argentina's first feature-length film, nor did it represent a stylistic breakthrough, as Nelly o la prima pobre was released the previous year, a 60-minute production sponsored by and starring members of elite charitable societies. Nevertheless, Amalia was the longest film up to that time, with an original running time of 3,000 meters, and is also the oldest surviving feature film of the country. As in 1912 and 1913, it was the only film released that year, but as Mafud pointed out, "unlike the previous ones, the trail that Amalia would leave would be much more important, both in 'artistic' prestige and in commercial possibility." By then, national production of fiction films had been stagnant for years, following a brief boom during on the occasion of the Centennial celebrations. Amalia had a pedagogical purpose centered on the ideals and tastes of the upper classes, which gave national cinema a new "moral and artistic prestige", as it was not only featured prominently in the society sections of major newspapers but also in theater reviews, initiating film criticism in Argentina.

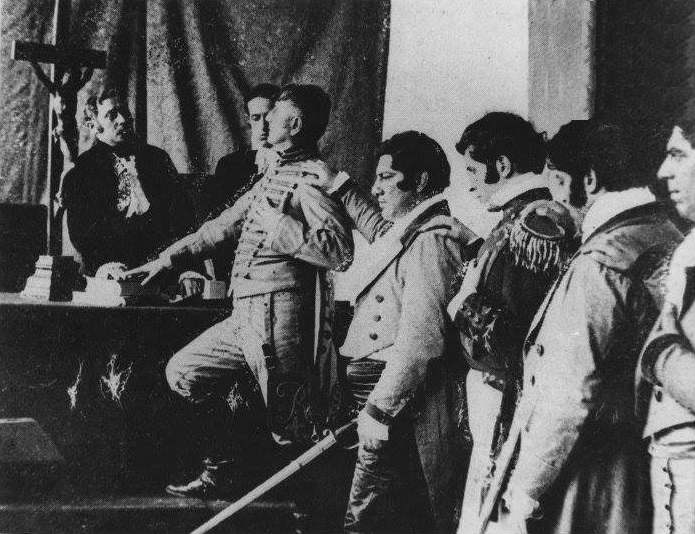
Film still of Mariano Moreno y la Revolución de Mayo (1915). Produced by Glücksmann in an attempt to replicate the success of Amalia, it became the most expensive production of Argentine cinema up to that moment.

The influence of Amalia is evident in most of the following year's film production. On the one hand, it gave a notable boost to films linked to the elite's institutions, with at least three—El tímido, Deuda sagrada, and Un romance argentino—of the seven films released in 1915 being produced by benevolent societies. Additionally, the film demonstrated the financial potential of national cinema, pulling in over 35,000 pesos from just a few high-end screenings, where the cost of admission was set high for an exclusive, affluent crowd. For example, director Julio Irigoyen, who became the "paradigm of low-budget cinema", declared that he made his first film inspired by the economic success of Amalia and the high price of its tickets, stating: "Fifteen pesos a seat when in the best cinemas downtown you paid twenty... cents to see Pearl White, Charlie Chaplin, Maciste, etcetera!". Glücksmann himself was the first to try to replicate the success of Amalia and shortly after its premiere began filming Mariano Moreno y la Revolución de Mayo (1915), and in the course of the year built his own filming studio in the barrio of Belgrano. Unlike its predecessor, Mariano Moreno y la Revolución de Mayo premiered in commercial theaters, where it competed directly with the European productions that dominated the local screen. It also featured leading Argentine stage actors, such as members of the Podestá family and Camila Quiroga, who combined artistic prestige with wide popular appeal. With a budget of 70,000 pesos, the film was the most ambitious Argentine production to date and would remain so for several years, considering that film investments between 1915 and 1916 generally ranged from 4,000 to 50,000 pesos. Nevertheless, the film failed to achieve the expected success, and Glücksmann's plans to continue producing large-scale historical works—timed to coincide with the centennial of independence in 1916—collapsed. His subsequent films were made on much smaller budgets, and by 1916 he withdrew permanently from fiction production.

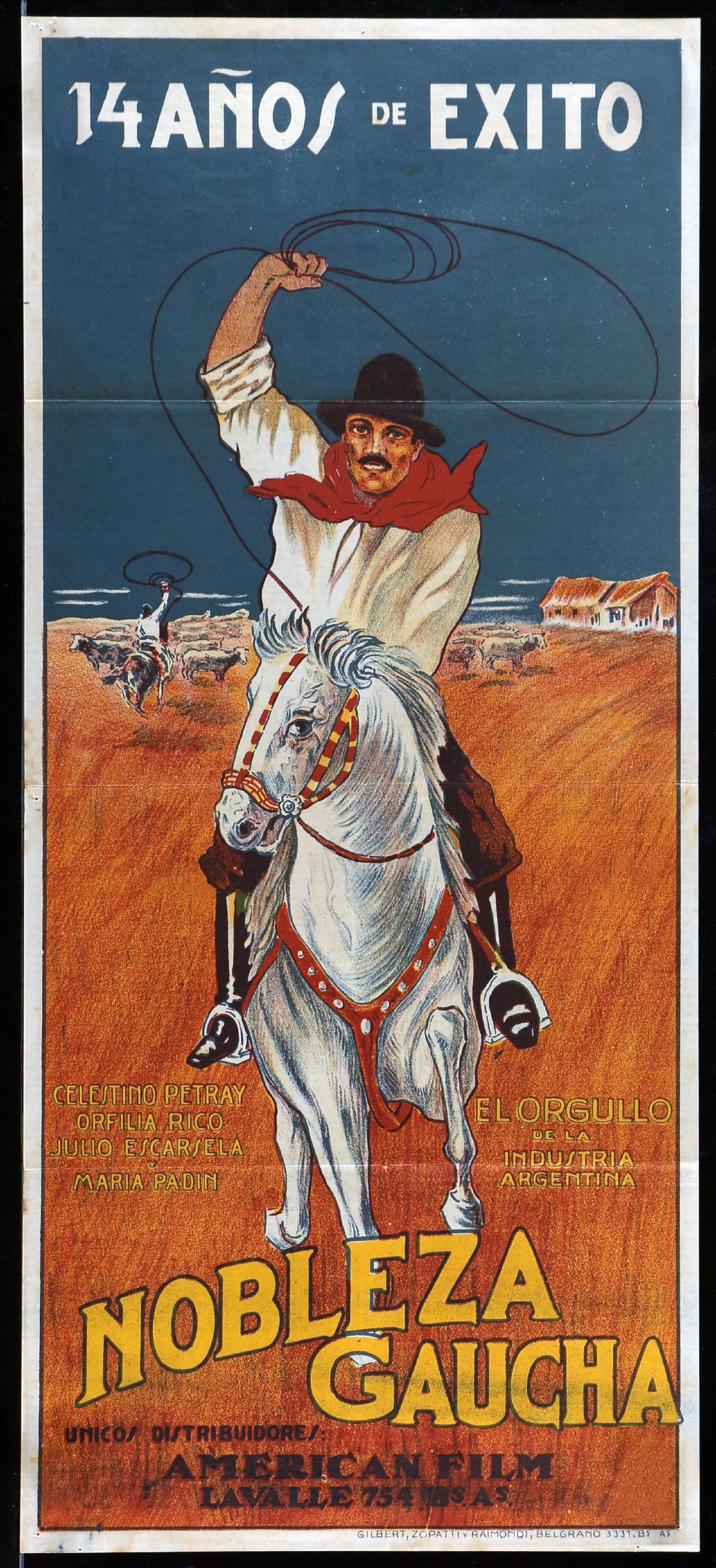
The unprecedented commercial success of Nobleza gaucha (1915) inaugurated a new boom period for Argentine silent cinema.

Glücksmann's efforts were informed by his role as the leading importer of films in 1914–1915, seeing local production as a way of addressing the crisis in a market heavily dependent on European cinema. With the outbreak of World War I in 1914, the film industries of France and Italy, the most important at the time, were severely affected and reduced their exports to markets such as Argentina and the rest of Latin America. At the same time, domestic demand for film was rapidly expanding, and the shortage of imports created an opening that could be filled with national productions. In this context, the retreat of European film production due to the war resulted in an abundance of Argentine production in the following years. As noted by Mahieu, during this time Argentine cinema "tends to abandon its character of empirical adventure, to become an entertainment industry. New distributors appeared, and in 1914 Pampa Film was founded, which produced several films." Argentina emerged as one of the most significant producers of fiction films in Latin America, notable for both the number of films made and the recognition they received. Favored by the war in Europe, the country experienced a "golden age" of silent films and led their production in Spanish, with more than 100 feature films being made between 1915 and 1924, equal to the combined total of those made in Mexico and Spain. During the first three decades of the 20th century, more than 200 silent feature films were produced in the country, in addition to a large number of documentaries, newsreels and shorter fictional works. By 1918, Buenos Aires counted roughly 120 cinemas, and trade journals alternated between enthusiasm and complaint about uneven programming, rushed projection speeds that distorted running times, and thin musical accompaniment, which pointed to a market expanding faster than its technical standards.

The release of the 1915 film Nobleza gaucha—a project by Humberto Cairo, Eduardo Martínez de la Pera and Ernesto Gunche—was a turning point in Argentine film history, opening new artistic and economic paths and paving the way for the profitability of national cinema. Unlike Amalia or Mariano Moreno, this rural drama set within the gauchesque tradition achieved success by featuring popular-class protagonists—a gaucho and an Italian smallholder—whose conflict over the abduction of a woman allowed broad social sectors to see themselves represented. Nicknamed "the goldmine" by distributors and exhibitors, Nobleza gaucha was an unexpected massive commercial success which remained in theaters for more than two decades,and was also released in Spain and several Latin American countries. The film received wide acclaim from the press, which praised it as comparable to the best foreign productions, and it became the highest-grossing film of Argentine silent cinema. Its influence was evident in the wave of explicitly national titles that followed its success, as distributors, programmers and exhibitors recognized their commercial potential, leading to a sharp growth of film activity with new producers and directors entering the field—though none matched the initial success of Nobleza gaucha. Martínez de la Pera and Gunche followed with the release of Hasta después de muerta (1916), Brenda (1921), Fausto (1922) and La casa de los cuervos (1923). Following the success of Nobleza gaucha, between 1915 and 1916 several investors in national films built or acquired shooting galleries and laboratories in Buenos Aires, among them Glücksmann, Martínez and Gunche, Cinematografía del Río de la Plata, Cóndor Film and Ortiz Film. By 1917, new companies such as Colón Film, Argentina Film, Austral Film, Platense Film S.A., and Mario Gallo's Talleres Cinematográficos had emerged, while other producers, lacking infrastructure, were forced to rent facilities or partner with these firms or smaller workshops for the technical production of their films. As noted by Fernando Martín Peña:

If anything characterizes Argentine silent cinema, even during its most prolific period, it is its dispersion and diversity. Instead of being concentrated in large companies, production appears atomized in dozens of independent enterprises, technically assisted by a relatively small number of specialists and laboratories (or "talleres" [workshops], in the terms of the time). This phenomenon explains its wide thematic variety and its singularities: in this mode of production, opposed by definition to the mass production favored by the big studios, the exception was the rule.

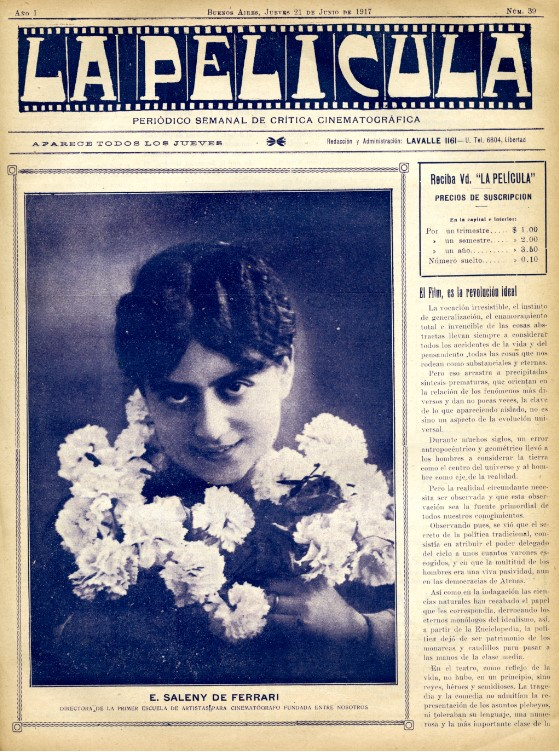
Cover of film periodical La Película in 1917 featuring Emilia Saleny, a pioneering woman filmmaker.

Unlike the later industrial system, the context of dispersed, small-scale production of silent films allowed the emergence of the first women filmmakers in Argentina. Among the earliest was Angélica García de García Mansilla, whose Un romance argentino (1915) was linked to the nationalist atmosphere preceding the centenary of independence; produced within charitable circles, it sought to associate the upper classes with the essence of the nation while also signaling cultural affinities with Europe and the United States. Around the same time, Emilia Saleny, originally an actress, founded an Academy of Cinematographic Arts and directed at least two children's films, while Antonieta Capurro de Renauld—also a teacher—produced a contested but early example of educational cinema for children, both cases rooted in contemporary debates about juvenile delinquency and the moral dangers of commercial film. María B. de Celestini, with a background in theater, directed Mi derecho (1920), a protofeminist work that challenged social conventions by depicting the right of a single woman to motherhood, a theme that echoed in her later plays. Another important figure was Elena Sansinena de Elizalde, later founder of Amigos del Arte, who was credited in some accounts as director of Blanco y negro (1920), based on a play by Henri Bernstein and possibly co-directed with Victoria Ocampo. According to Julio Noé, Sansinena's strong personality and leadership style suggested that any collaborators "were chosen, encouraged, and infused with her fervor". Although these contributions were scattered and often tied to elite cultural projects, they reveal how women directors and screenwriters helped shape segments of Argentine silent cinema before the rise of industrial production in the 1930s effectively excluded them for decades.

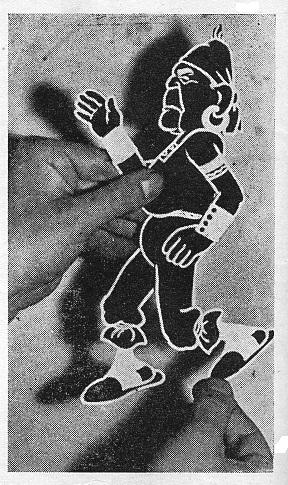
A cutout figure of President Hipólito Yrigoyen used in Quirino Cristiani's El apóstol (1917), the world's first animated feature film.

Between 1916 and 1917, national film production grew sharply, rising from 7 releases in 1915 to 26 in 1916 and 21 in 1917. Successful titles like Bajo el sol de la pampa (1916), Resaca (1916), Hasta después de muerta (1916) and Santos Vega (1917) reflected audiences' desire to see familiar actors and local themes on screen. The emerging film industry drew heavily on established cultural forms, particularly the national theater. Producers frequently recruited leading stage actors, whose popularity was highlighted in advertising, and film schedules often had to adjust to their theatrical commitments or tours. Theatrical circles, in turn, were attracted by the new medium, which promised fame and financial reward comparable to that enjoyed by foreign film stars. The commercial theater provided plots and adaptations, while variety theaters integrated film into their shows and performers carried over their characters and styles to the screen, creating a process of cross-pollination between stage and cinema. At the same time, exhibitors and publicists embraced modern promotion: large color posters, richly illustrated magazines and prominent press ads became routine. The local press also intensified coverage, dedicating regular columns to film news and inflating anticipation for national releases with lists of costs, stars and production details. Cinema's ties with the press were strong, with periodicals such as Fray Mocho, Crítica and PBT organized screenwriting contests to finance and promote films. Newspapers also inspired genres, as caricaturists supplied early animation, comic strips were adapted into films, and crime reporting fed both documentaries and fiction features. Cartoonist Quirino Cristiani directed El apóstol (1917), the first animated feature film in world history. Combining political satire with innovative cut-out techniques, the work established Argentina as a pioneer in animation, though it is now lost.

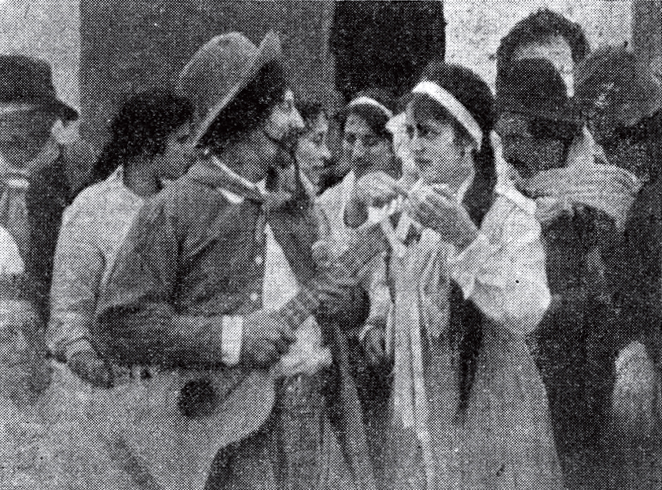
A scene from Santos Vega (1917), directed by Carlos de Paoli, with José Juan Podesta in the title role.

Nevertheless, the momentum was fragile and the nascent industry could not withstand the massive influx of U.S. films beginning in 1917, which quickly reasserted foreign dominance over the Argentine market. The outbreak of World War I not only curtailed European film production and exports but also facilitated the emergence of the United States as the world's leading cinematic power. American films were perceived as more naturalistic and dynamic, contrasting with the theatricality of Italian productions, and their arrival reshaped audience tastes while exposing the technical and aesthetic limitations of Argentine films. The massive influx of U.S. productions, supported by aggressive publicity, quickly dominated the exhibition circuit, restricting the distribution of national works. U.S. companies flooded the market not only with recent releases but also with previously unavailable titles, including superproductions like The Birth of a Nation (1915), Intolerance (1916) and Cleopatra (1917), all of which premiered in Buenos Aires in 1919 with unprecedented publicity campaigns. The absence of fixed weekly programming meant that competition among exhibitors for access to foreign releases was intense, and local films were often relegated to marginal slots or excluded from downtown theaters altogether. The high cost of U.S. exclusivity contracts further disadvantaged Argentine distributors, who paid much more than their French or Brazilian counterparts, while producers were forced to charge ticket prices equal to or higher than those of technically superior foreign films. Dependence extended beyond exhibition: most raw film stock, especially Kodak celluloid, also had to be imported from the United States at inflated prices. These structural conditions, compounded by the fragility of the local industry, led to stagnation: Argentine film output fell to 16 in 1918 and 1919, and to only 9 in 1920. Press outlets began calling for protective measures, such as tariff exemptions on raw film stock, subsidies for local production, or tax reductions for cinemas showing Argentine films. By late 1917, journals openly described a "heavy and unpleasant" climate; unions of exhibitors and operators drafted statutes to defend the sector from punitive taxes and patent fees, while the same magazines admitted that close to 90% of their pages now celebrated U.S. cinema at the expense of local work. Despite demands, no government policies were implemented during this period.

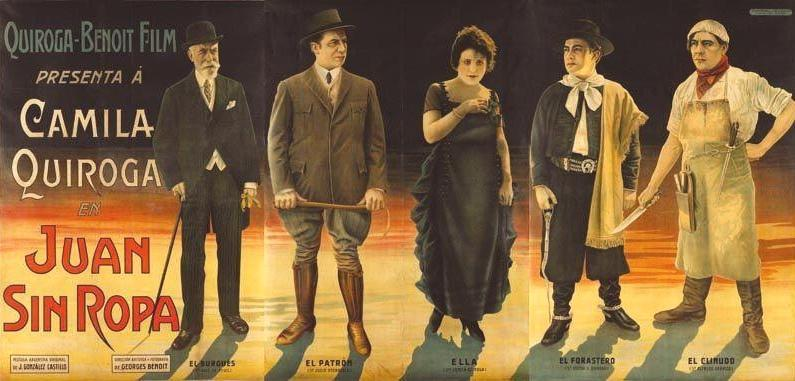
Juan Sin Ropa (1919), directed by Georges Benoît and produced alongside its protagonists Camila and Héctor Quiroga, is one of the most celebrated films of the Argentine silent era.

In the aftermath of U.S. dominance, two opposing tendencies emerged in Argentine cinema in 1919, both paradoxically influenced by U.S. models. One sought to attract major investment by hiring renowned stage actors, successful playwrights, and experienced foreign directors to create "quality" productions comparable to U.S. films but rooted in national themes. This approach was exemplified by En buena ley (1919), a rural drama written by José Mazzanti and directed by Italian Alberto Traversa, and Juan Sin Ropa (1919), a social melodrama by playwright José González Castillo and French director Georges Benoît. Regarded as one of the greatest Argentine films of the silent era, Juan Sin Ropa has been praised for its expressive close-ups and dynamic editing, which Kevin Brownlow judged superior to comparable sequences in Griffith's Intolerance. The other trend during the era was defined by low-budget productions from small publishers, aesthetically shaped by American techniques and genres but adapted to local elements. Represented by works such as José A. Ferreyra's Campo ajuera (1919) and Roberto Guidi's El mentir de los demás (1919), it found its main advocate in Leopoldo Torres Ríos (a future filmmaker and one of the country's first film critics), who urged filmmakers to avoid costly failures, form actors and directors within cinema itself rather than importing theatrical conventions, and cultivate new talent from among young film enthusiasts. The coexistence of both models proved difficult. Producers like Mario Gallo and Héctor Quiroga soon abandoned fiction filmmaking, despite Juan Sin Ropa's success, citing the overwhelming presence of foreign films and the need to conquer external markets through coproductions with European capital. Torres Ríos, in contrast, argued that only sustained low-cost, technically solid production could attract audiences and eventually larger investments, while warning against amateurs and opportunistic distributors who undermined the reputation of national cinema. It was filmmakers aligned with this second current who would carry Argentine production forward through the silent era, though both approaches contributed to the technical advances recognized by critics in the early 1920s. By late 1919, discussion turned to the need for a consolidated national industry, though the absence of adequate legislation on raw film stock, burdened by high import tariffs and the lack of government support left local production at a disadvantage. Despite isolated artistic successes, the industry found itself increasingly cornered as it entered the 1920s.

=== 1920–1933: The 1920s and the transition to sound ===
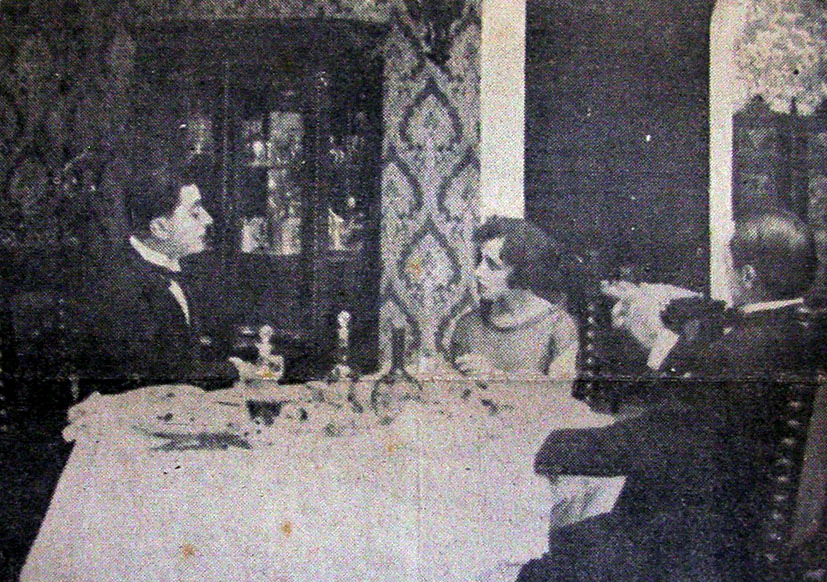
Argentino Gómez, Berta Singerman and Santos Casabal in La vendedora de Harrods (1921), directed by Francisco Defilippis Novoa.

In the early 1920s, Argentine cinema was going through a period of uncertainty caused, on the one hand, by the recovery of the European film industry after the end of World War I and, on the other, by the ascent of Hollywood cinema to a position of unparalleled international dominance. This situation was explicitly denounced in 1922 by Leopoldo Torres Ríos, who lamented: "When they show an Argentine production, they do it as if it were alms. Those same gentlemen endure daily the cinematographic detritus sent from the East to the West and our public, on their immense, broad backs, carries it without a protest." The most notable successes of this period in Argentine cinema did not stem from the competing trends that had defined the previous decade. The first major box-office hit was La vendedora de Harrods (1921), directed by Francisco Defilippis Novoa, an adaptation of Josué Quesada's popular novel. Premiering under adverse conditions on a Monday, the film achieved exceptional public acclaim despite receiving lukewarm reviews from critics. Its success continued a line inaugurated in 1917 with Delfina (1917–1919), based on the novel by Manuel T. Podestá, and Flor de durazno (1917), adapted from Hugo Wast. These productions brought to the screen works by widely read, if not always critically prestigious, authors whose novels were published in mass-market series such as La Novela Semanal, Biblioteca La Nación and La Novela del Día. The release of a film often boosted the circulation of these novels, while in reverse, short novels were sometimes written to accompany or expand upon the storylines of recently released films.

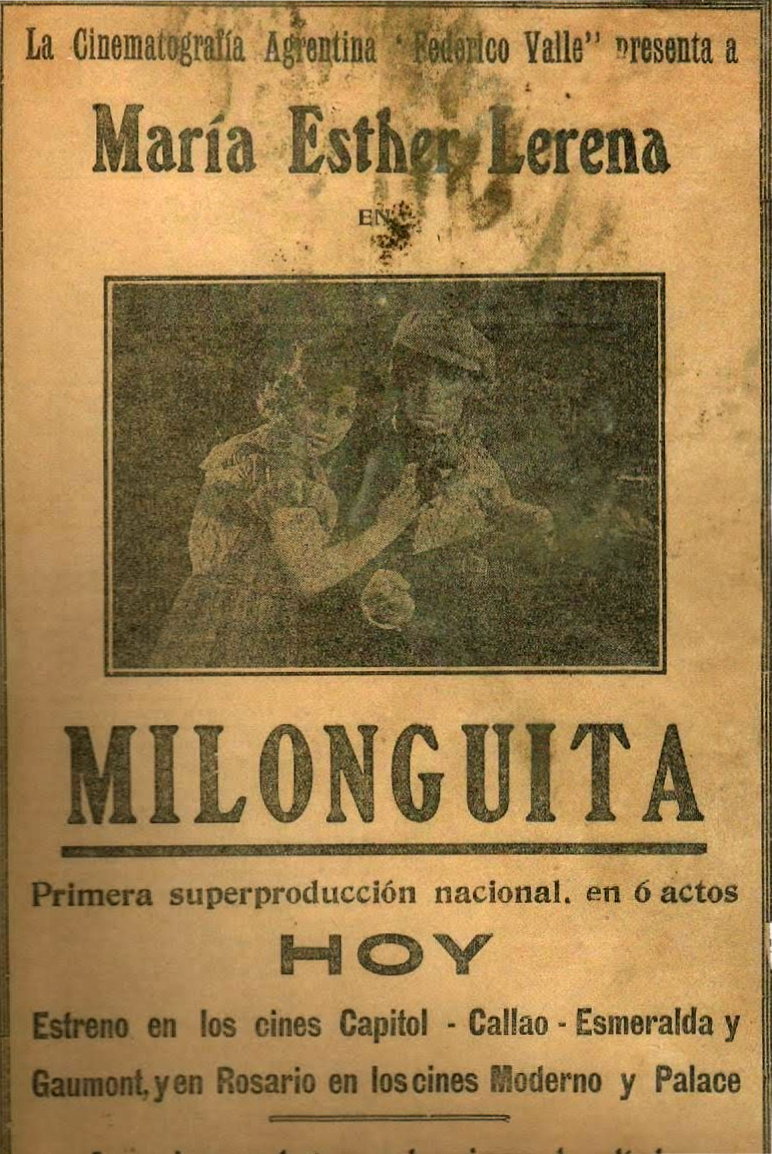
Advertisement for Milonguita (1922), directed by José Bustamante y Ballivián.

This model of adaptation attracted other popular writers. Juan B. Lecuona founded Estrella Film to bring his novel El triunfo de la verdad to the screen, while Hugo Wast established Hugo Wast Film in 1922 to produce adaptations of his own works, including La casa de los cuervos (1923), Valle negro (1924) and Pata de zorra (1924). At the same time, literary classics of the 19th century were also adapted, as in Martín Fierro (1923), El Fausto criollo (1922), El puñal del mazorquero (1923, based on Juana Manuela Gorriti), and La epopeya del gaucho Juan Moreira (1924). Another major success was Milonguita (1922), directed by José Bustamante y Ballivián, which highlighted cinema's growing association with tango, then at the height of its popularity. The film extended a cultural cycle that began with the tango of the same name by Enrique Delfino and Samuel Linning, premiered in the sainete Delikatessen Haus in 1920, subsequently recorded by Carlos Gardel, and widely disseminated through printed sheet music. Linning also authored a sainete titled Milonguita in 1922, the same year the film was released. For the film version, Delfino himself provided the score, performed live by his orchestra during screenings. This marked the consolidation of the first "tango melodrama" model in Argentine silent cinema, a trend that would continue with titles such as La cieguita de la avenida Alvear (Julio Irigoyen, 1924) and La borrachera del tango (Edmo Cominetti, 1928). Tango soon became a dominant presence in the music accompanying films, including foreign productions. Its influence expanded with La muchacha del arrabal (1922, José A. Ferreyra), where music by Roberto Firpo was performed live, and Melenita de oro (1923), inspired by another tango by Linning.

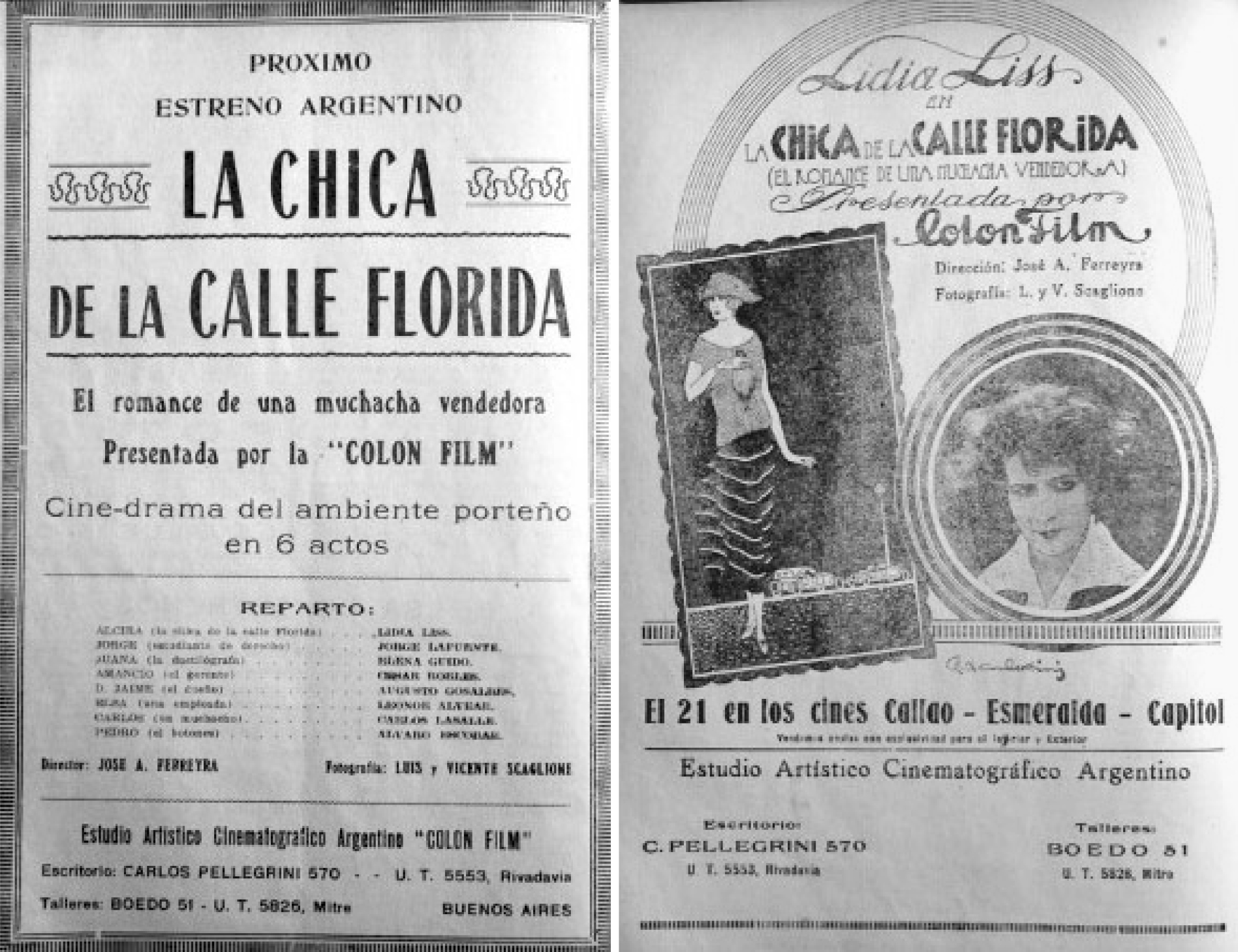
Advertisements for José A. Ferreyra's La chica de la calle Florida (1922) published in trade magazine Excelsior.

The combined success of La vendedora de Harrods and Milonguita, along with other profitable productions such as Ferreyra's La chica de la calle Florida (1922) and Nelo Cosimi's El remanso (1922), signaled the possibility of a sustainable national cinema industry. Film production increased from around 15 titles in 1921 and 12 in 1922 to 24 in 1923. This growth sparked renewed debate in the press on measures to protect and encourage local cinema, including proposals for tax exemptions, an annual state-sponsored prize for the best film, and the creation of a national cinema day. None of these initiatives were implemented, and the fragile industry relied instead on self-organized institutions. These included the Unión Filmadores Argentinos (1923), which briefly sought to consolidate producers; the distributor Selección Nacional, dedicated exclusively to Argentine films; and the Asociación Cinematográfica Nacional, which brought together professionals from across the field to promote local productions. Public attention also expanded through media coverage of film actors, with magazines and newspapers publishing photographs, interviews, and feature articles. This culminated in the publication of Roberto Gustavino Molinari's Estrellas del cine (1923), a book of interviews with leading actors, reflecting the early formation of a local star system.

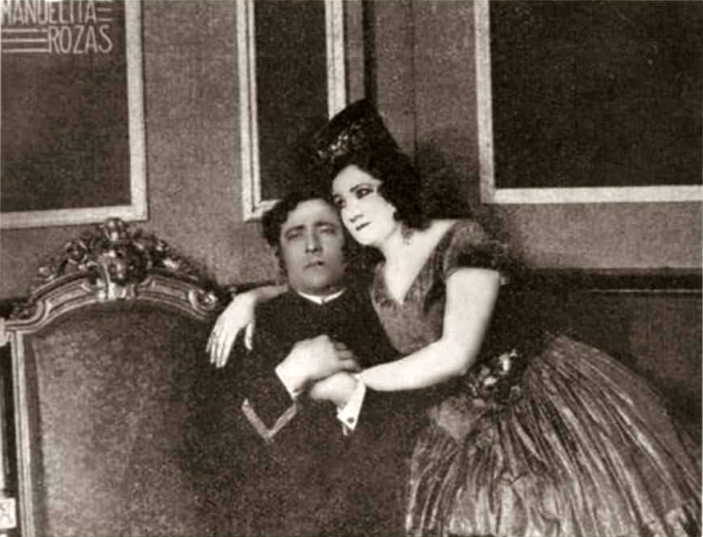
Nelo Cosimi and Blanca Podestá in Manuelita Rosas (1925), directed by Ricardo Villarán.

Despite this apparent boom, the industry remained precarious. Organizations like the Unión Filmadores Argentinos quickly dissolved, Selección Nacional ceased operations in 1924, and the local star system proved unstable. Production was dominated by small companies such as Julio Irigoyen's Buenos Aires Film, which in 1923–1924 released 7 films, including Sombras de Buenos Aires and De nuestras pampas. Irigoyen, who had founded Buenos Aires Film as early as 1913, specialized in rapid, very low-budget productions of melodramatic and popular subjects. His film De nuestras pampas (1923) also marked the screen debut of José Gola, later a celebrated star of the sound era. While financially successful, these works were often criticized for their low budgets, brief shooting schedules, and aesthetic shortcomings when measured against the dominant American narrative model. In this way, Buenos Aires Film came to epitomize precisely the type of cinema that earlier pioneers such as Mario Gallo, Héctor Quiroga and Roberto Guidi—and even the inconsistent José A. Ferreyra—had sought to overcome. Alongside Irigoyen, other directors were central to sustaining silent film production in the 1920s. Nelo Cosimi, an Italian-born actor who turned to directing with El remanso (1922), often combined the roles of filmmaker, screenwriter and actor, and later remained active as an actor in the sound era until his death in 1945. His films included El lobo de la víbora, La mujer y la bestia and Federales y unitarios (1927). Edmo Cominetti, with prior experience in photography, directed his first film in 1920 and gained attention with Bajo la mirada de Dios (1926)—which was even screened in the United States—and La borrachera del tango, acclaimed by critics and audiences alike.

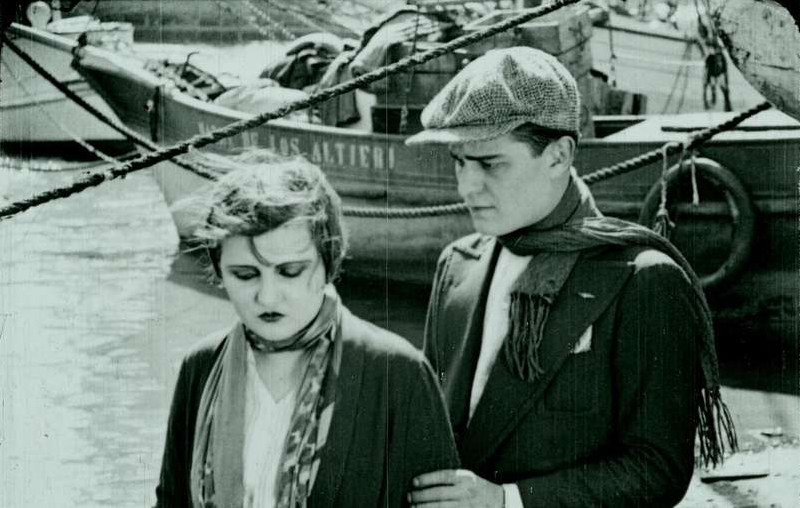
María Turgenova and Ermete Meliante in Perdón, viejita (1927), directed by José A. Ferreyra.

Ferreyra, who began his career in the mid-1910s, is considered the most important Argentine filmmaker of the 1920s, and continued to be a central figure during the transition to sound and later in the classical-industrial period. His prolific output during the silent period positioned him as an intuitive and popular chronicler of Buenos Aires life, and his work became the most complete form of the silent "tango melodrama" model. Considered a precursor of neorealism, Ferreyra's influential style was characterized by its profoundly local identity, with characters and situations linked to the world of tango lyrics and the urban working classes of Buenos Aires, in whose streets he filmed with low resources and often starring non-actors. His films, often melodramatic but deeply rooted in the everyday world of the arrabal, earned him the nickname of a "minor poet of the suburbs" for their portrayal of archetypal characters with a fresh and simple authenticity, akin to the tone of poet Evaristo Carriego. Many of Ferreyra's titles point to a connection with the mythology of the city and its music: La muchacha del arrabal (1922), Buenos Aires, ciudad de ensueño (1922), Mi último tango (1925), El organito de la tarde (1925), Muchachita de Chiclana (1926), La vuelta al bulín (1926) and Perdón, viejita (1927), among others. Some of these films were based on specific tangos while others inspired the composition of new tangos, and also incorporated other elements of popular culture such as sainete and serial novels. As noted by film historian Jorge Miguel Couselo: "In Ferreyra, also a sporadic lyricist, the identification with tango is total. His adherence to Buenos Aires, to the most needy and suffering face of Buenos Aires, is a porteñismo of soul, temperament and habit, synonymous with tango. The subject matter of his films is tango, an eager search to discover the dramatizable facets of the city song, its habitat, its types, its conflicts, its symbolic candor, its accessible tragedy."

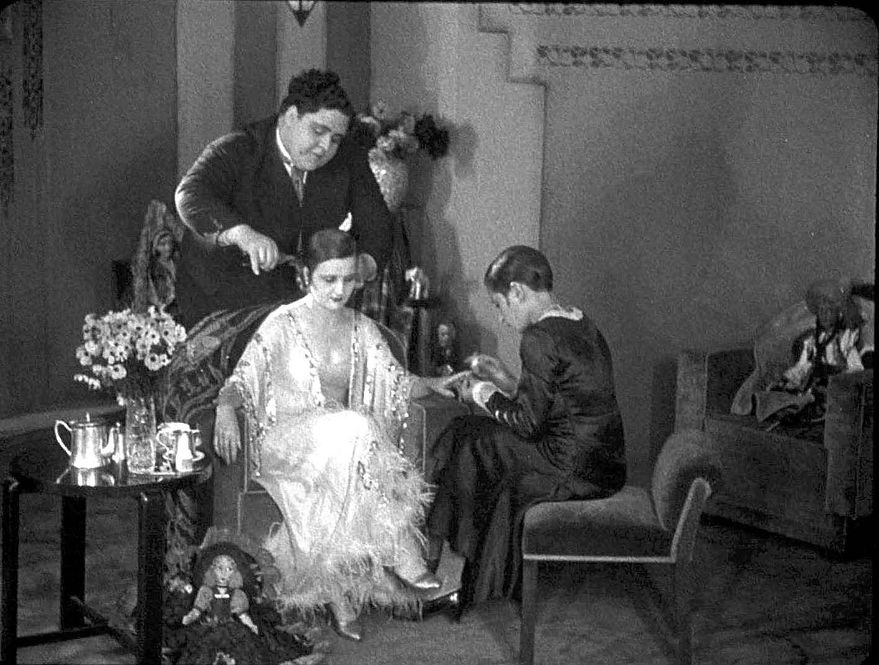
María Turgenova in José A. Ferreyra's Muñequitas porteñas (1931), one of the first sound films in the country, which used the sound-on-disc technique.

Around 1929, the inventor Alfredo Murúa—founder of Sociedad Impresora de Discos Electrofónicos (SIDE)—became a partner of the Ariel production company, and produced the short film Mosaico criollo, with his own sound-on-disc system. Mosaico criollo, the first instalment of an intended series, is not a spoken film but rather a filmed "musical revue". Murúa was responsible for the sound of most of the Argentine sound films made between 1931 and 1933, always using the sound-on-disc technique. The most important was Muñequitas porteñas (1931) by Ferreyra, for its pioneering use of spoken dialogue, although there were several others that used it partially, such as Amanecer de una raza (1931) by Cominetti, El cantar de mi ciudad (1930) by Ferreyra or La vía de oro (1931) by Cominetti; or that used sound to record only music and sound effects, among them ¡Adiós Argentina! (1930) by Mario Parpagnoli, La canción del gaucho (1930) by Ferreyra or Dios y la patria (1931) by Cosimi. It also happened that originally silent films were re-released with new sound added, as in the case of Nobleza Gaucha and Perdón, viejita, among others. As noted by Fernando Martín Peña: "In this sense, the transition [from silent to sound films] was complex and very similar to that which had just taken place in the United States and Europe."

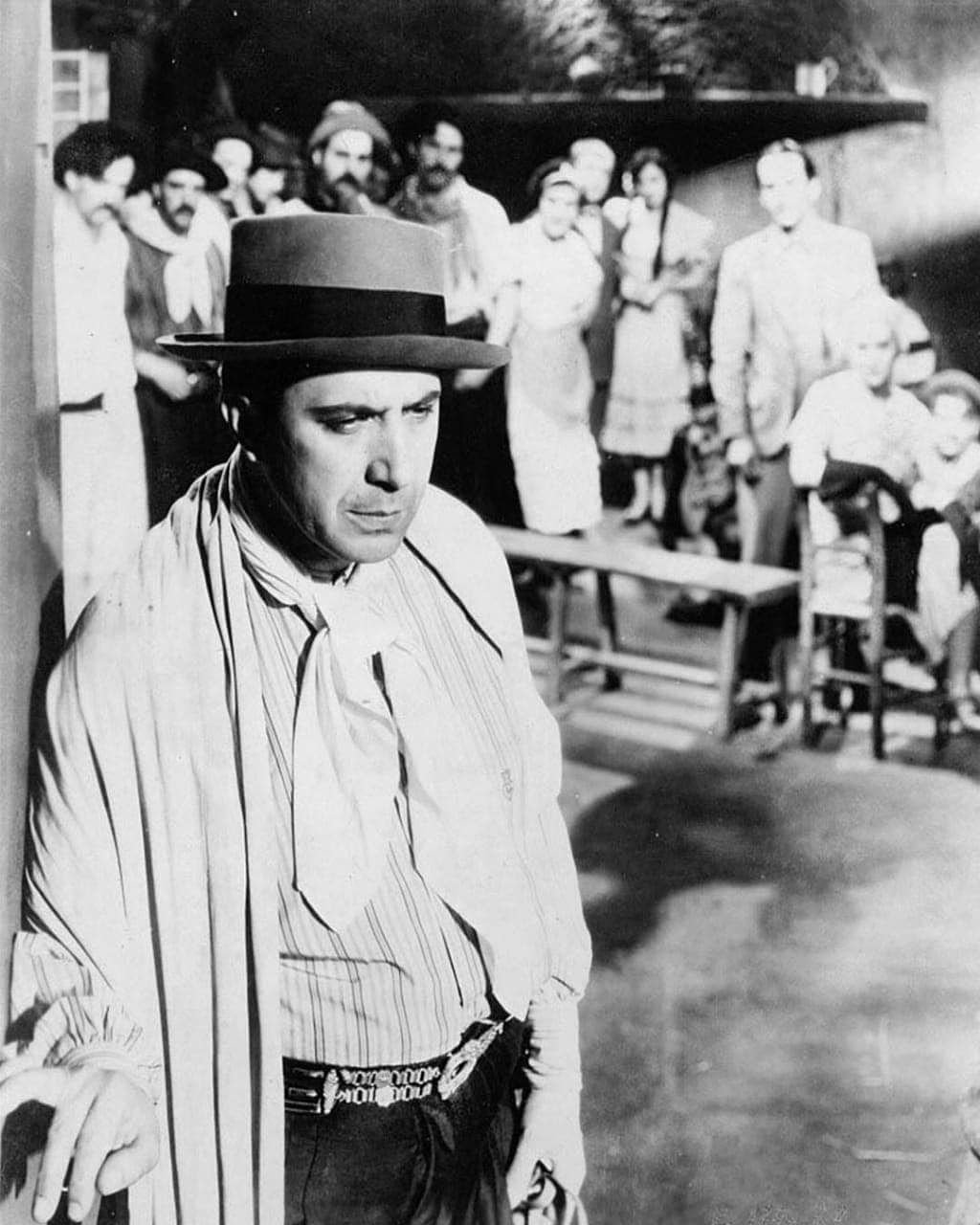
Carlos Gardel in Luces de Buenos Aires (1931), the first in a series of films produced by Paramount Pictures featuring the tango star that were decisively influential on the incipient local producers.

As in other countries, the arrival of sound films put in check the international dominance of American cinema due to the language barrier, leaving a market available. This situation was analogous to the one that occurred during World War I, when the European film crisis benefited Argentine producers. Hollywood tried to deal with these difficulties with attempts at dubbing that ended up failing and also with various forms of subtitling, although this still required technical development and also excluded illiterate audiences. Eventually, the U.S. industry reacted by making little accepted Spanish-language versions of its most important productions, although they found the greatest success once they began to make produce original Spanish-language films made to showcase Latin American stars. Among them, the 1931–1935 films made by Paramount Pictures starring Carlos Gardel stood out, and became a major influence on the emergence of an Argentine sound film industry. Before being hired by Paramount, Gardel—the most popular performer in the history of tango—had starred in a series of short films using optical sound between 1930 and 1931, which were directed by Eduardo Morera and produced by Federico Valle. The first of Gardel's feature films produced by Paramount was Luces de Buenos Aires, released in September 1931 to great success. By this time optical sound had demonstrated its advantage over disc systems, so the equipment was progressively replaced in a process that lasted throughout 1932.

Despite being foreign productions, Gardel's films may be considered as part of the history of Argentine cinema, as they were conceived by the singer himself together with other Argentine artists (like his lyricist Alfredo Le Pera or revue producer Manuel Romero), and their model corresponded to that of the tango dramas directed by Ferreyra during the silent era, resulting in a strong Argentine identity. In addition, their great commercial success demonstrated the commercial viability of a cinema of Argentine identity for the incipient local producers that would inaugurate the Golden Age period in 1933. Paradoxically, Hollywood's attempt to dominate the local market would soon result in the birth of the national industry, which would take Gardel's films as a model to be replicated. According to Peña, the success of Gardel's films was "in fact the success of Ferreyra's and Torres Ríos' ideas taken up by a popular idol and legitimized for the local culture because of their 'foreign' condition". In an interview, Argentine film historian Clara Kriger felt that: "... we [Argentine film historians] always say 'in 1933 the industry was born in Argentina', and the truth is that I would say that until Gardel appeared in films, Argentine cinema practically did not exist on billboards; very little Argentine cinema was being seen. Gardel is what gives Argentine cinema that strength on the billboards." Another aspect little mentioned by historians is that the last four Paramount productions with Gardel were in fact the singer and Le Pera's own productions that the studio agreed to finance, with full property rights for both creators after a first period of commercial exploitation.

=== 1933–1956: The Golden Age and the studio system ===
The years following the emergence of Argentina Sono Film and Lumiton in 1933 inaugurated what is widely known as the Golden Age of Argentine cinema or classical period, which lasted until the mid-1950s. Inspired by the Hollywood studio model, the nascent industry grew rapidly, developing its own star, genre and studio systems while drawing heavily on tango, radio and popular theater. By 1939, Argentina had become the world's leading producer of Spanish-language films, a position it held until 1942, when a U.S. embargo on raw film stock during World War II allowed Mexico to displace it as the dominant market. The government of Juan Perón (1946–1955) implemented protectionist measures that revitalized production, but his overthrow in 1955 and the collapse of the studio system brought the era to a close, leaving behind a rich body of work of which roughly half has since been lost.

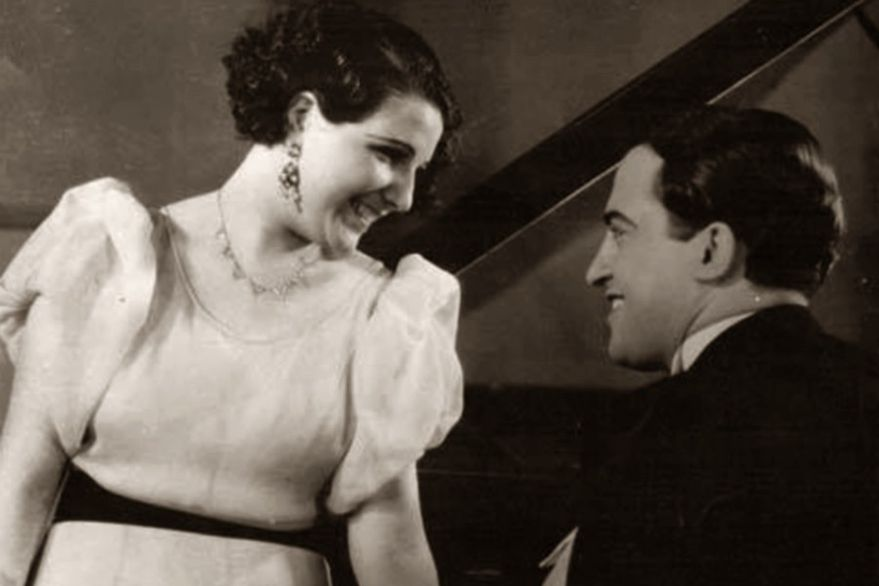
Libertad Lamarque and Alberto Gómez in Luis Moglia Barth's ¡Tango! (1933), the first optical sound film in Argentina, produced by Argentina Sono Film.

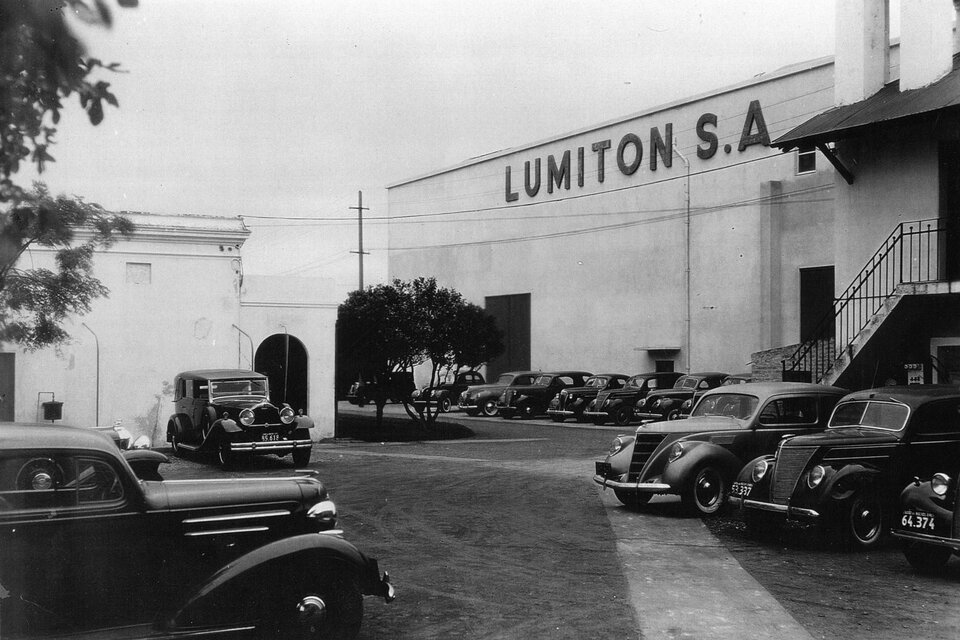
Lumiton studios in Munro, Greater Buenos Aires, one of Latin America's first purpose-built sound film studios.

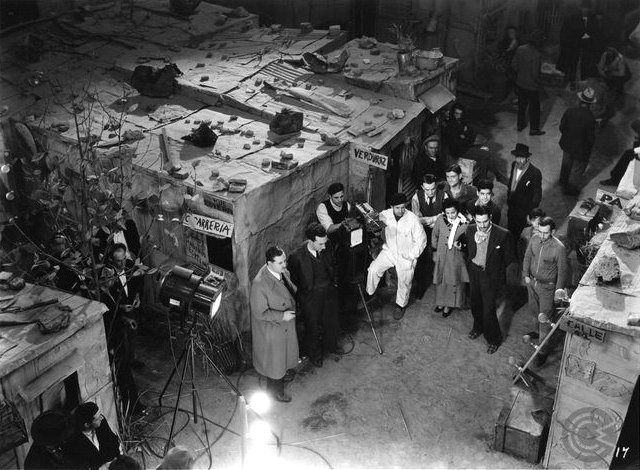
Shooting of Argentina Sono Film's Puerto Nuevo (1936), directed by Mario Soffici and Luis César Amadori, at SIDE's studios.

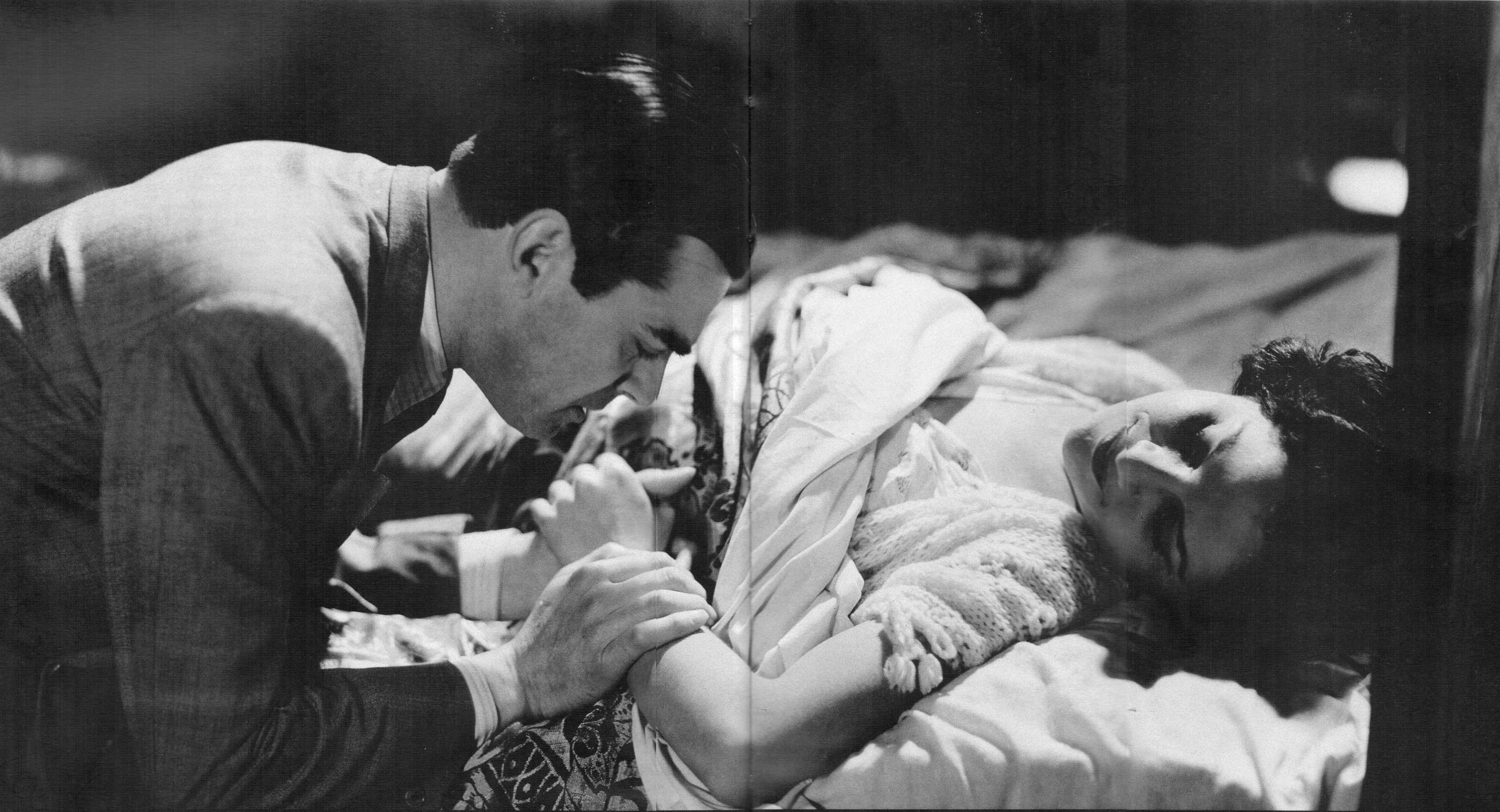
José Gola and Amelia Bence in Leopoldo Torres Ríos' La vuelta al nido (1938), a critical and commercial failure on release but later reevaluated as a precursor to modernist cinema.

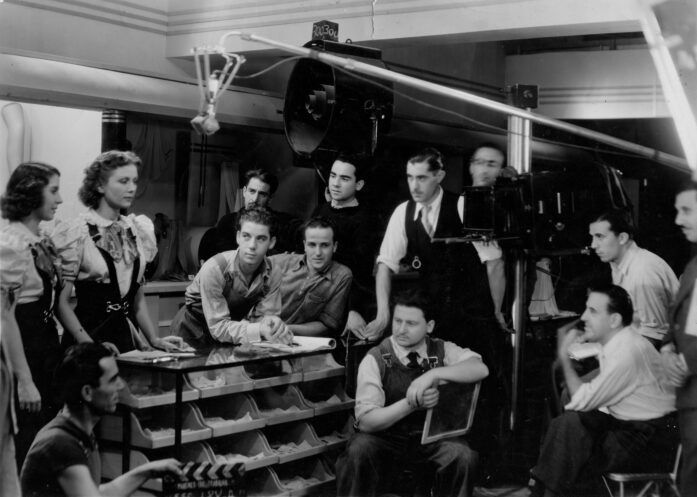
Filming of Mujeres que trabajan (1938) at Lumiton, with actresses Sabina Olmos and Mecha Ortiz at left and director Manuel Romero seated at right.

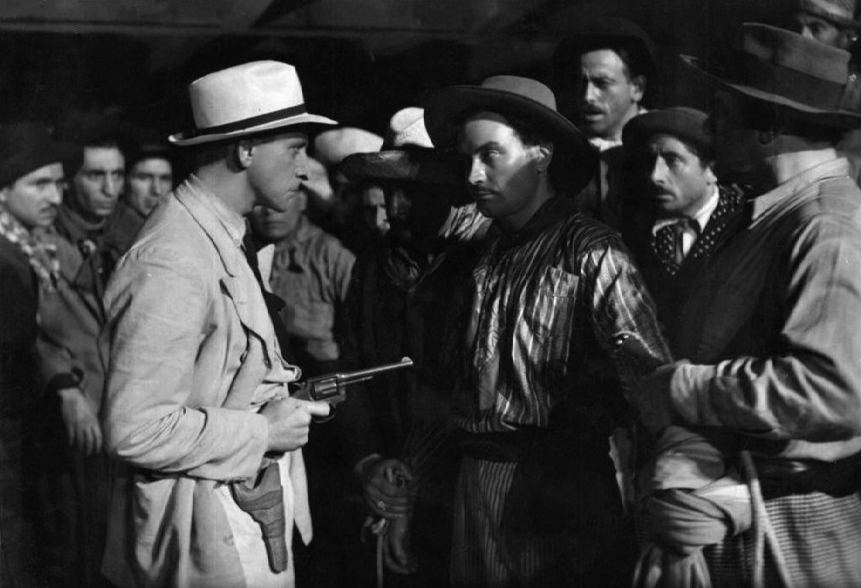
A scene from Mario Soffici's Prisioneros de la tierra (1939), for decades regarded as the greatest film in the history of Argentine cinema.

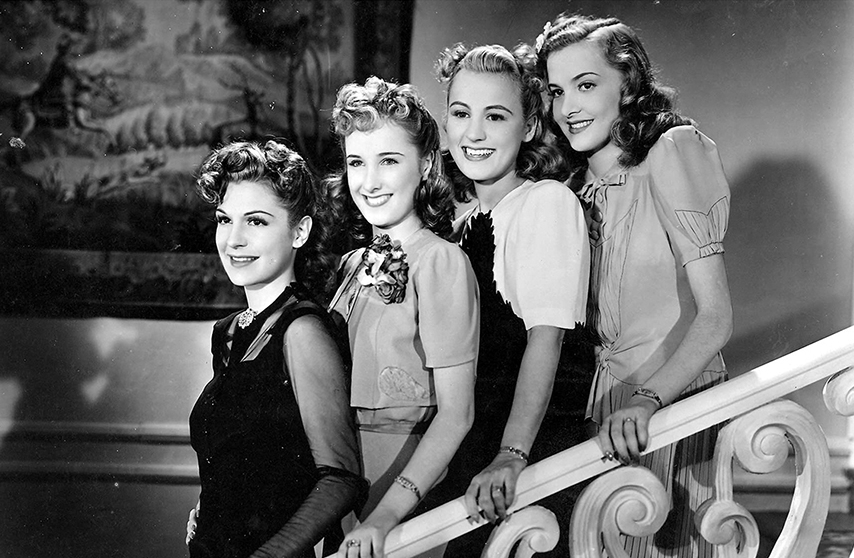
Zully Moreno, Mirtha Legrand, Nury Montsé and Silvana Roth in Francisco Mugica's Los martes, orquídeas (1941), which helped establish the bourgeois ingénue-led light romantic comedy as a staple of Argentine classical cinema.

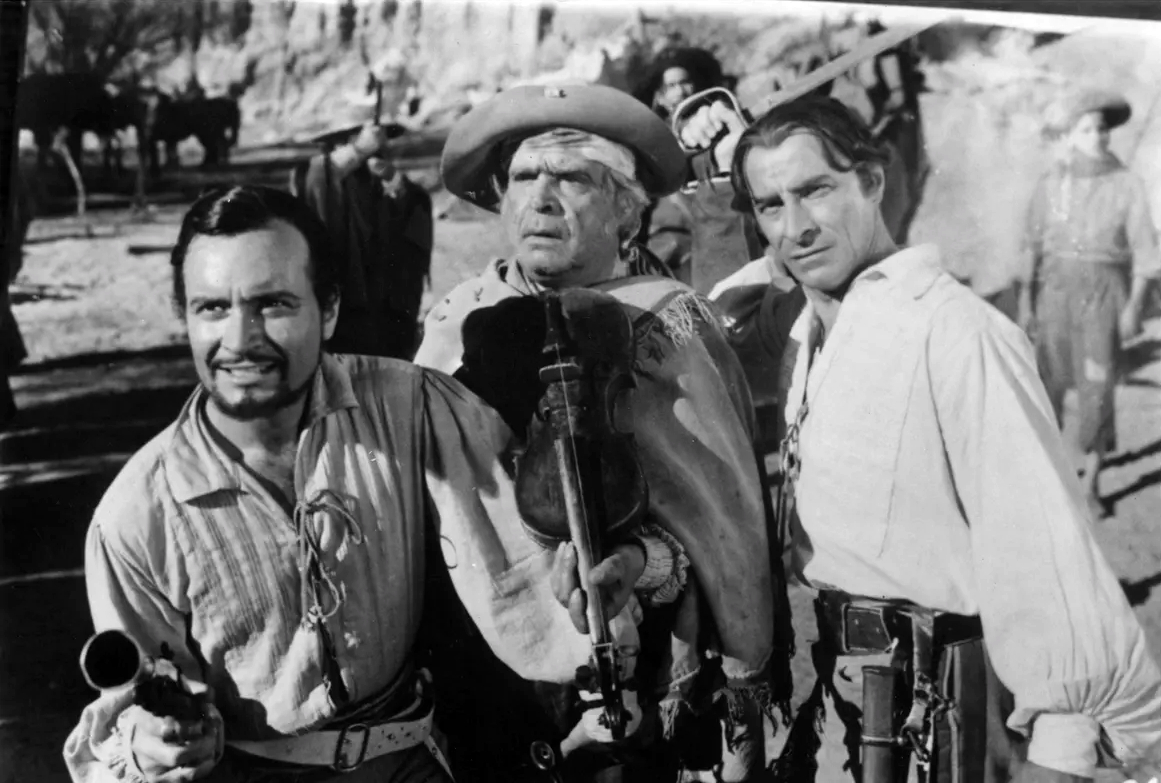
Ángel Magaña, Enrique Muiño and Sebastián Chiola in Lucas Demare's La guerra gaucha (1942), a historical epic that was a major critical and commercial success.

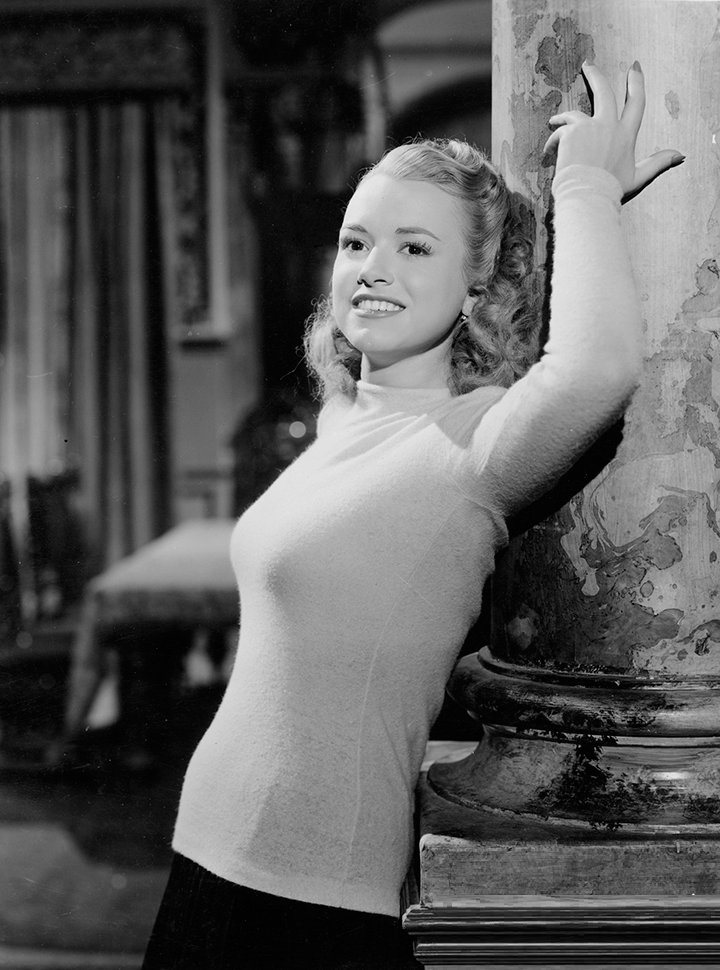
Olga Zubarry in La muerte camina en la lluvia (1949), directed by Carlos Hugo Christensen.

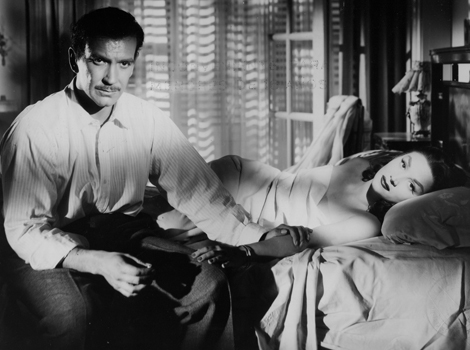
Carlos Cores and Julia Sandoval in Los tallos amargos (1956), directed by Fernando Ayala and produced by Artistas Argentinos Asociados.

=== 1956–1973: The era of modernism and political cinema ===
Since the late 1950s a new generation of film directors took Argentine films to international film festivals. The first wave of such directors was Leopoldo Torre-Nilsson, who "explored aristocratic decadence", Fernando Ayala, David Jose Kohon, Simon Feldman and Fernando "Pino" Solanas, who began by making La Hora de los Hornos ("Hour of the Furnaces", 1966–68) the first documentaries on the political unrest in late-1960s Argentina (at great risk to himself). The movie combines new and old film footage to explain the history of Argentina and the wave of revolutionary fervor that swept many countries in Latin America. From the Spanish invaders to modern military concerns financed by foreign powers, this feature examines racism, social upheaval, native massacres and the precarious political situations that could change in the wake of revolutionary rebellion. This outstanding documentary launched the Third Cinema movement and put Latin American cinema on the international map.

Directors such as Tulio Demicheli and Carlos Schlieper began to emerge who often both wrote and directed them. A second generation that achieved a cinematographic style were José A. Martínez Suárez, Manuel Antín and Leonardo Favio.

=== 1973–1976: The "Camporist spring" and political violence ===
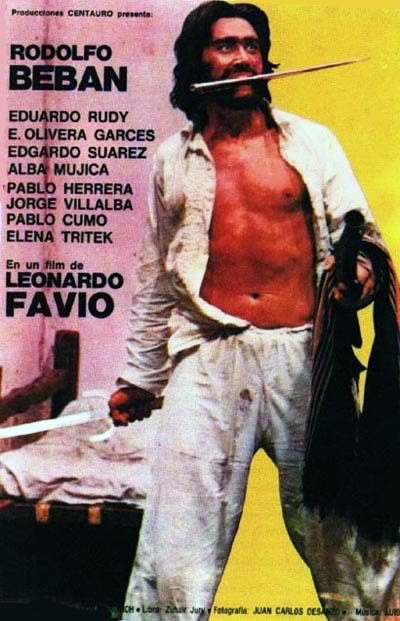
Poster of Leonardo Favio's Juan Moreira (1973), featuring Rodolfo Bebán in the title role.

The return of democracy in 1973 opened a brief but decisive chapter for Argentine cinema. On 25 May, Héctor J. Cámpora assumed the presidency with 50% of the electorate, ending eighteen years of Peronist proscription, and placed Hugo del Carril and Mario Soffici at the head of the Instituto Nacional de Cinematografía (INC). In August, Octavio Getino was appointed interventor of the Ente de Calificación Cinematográfica with the dual purpose of promoting a new film law to abolish censorship and, in the meantime, to prevent cuts and bans. Although Del Carril's presence was largely symbolic given his residence abroad, Soffici pursued active management, enforcing labor regulations, reviving the Sindicato de la Industria Cinematográfica Argentina (SICA), and reactivating the Cámara de la Industria Cinematográfica as a coordinating body. Getino's own appointment carried symbolic weight: as a figure associated with the Grupo Cine Liberación, he now assumed responsibility for an institution that his generation had long criticized.

These domestic changes unfolded in a wider international context marked by U.S. strategic setbacks. In March 1976, Henry Kissinger acknowledged that 6decades of Soviet industrial-military expansion had brought Moscow close to parity with Washington—an admission that would have been unthinkable a decade earlier. This new balance coincided with U.S. defeats in Indochina and the rise of independence movements in Africa, which undermined the economies and political confidence of Europe and the United States. In this scenario, Europe became the main arena of political negotiation, while Latin America remained a U.S. preserve. The Southern Cone, where leaders such as Salvador Allende, Juan José Torres, Juan Velasco Alvarado, and Juan Domingo Perón had promoted projects of autonomous development, was targeted for rollback, and local "demolition forces" were mobilized to neutralize those experiments.

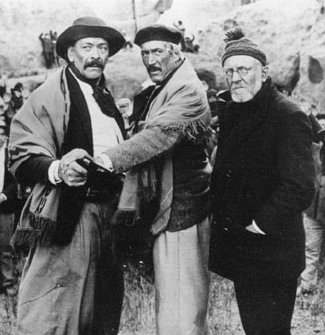
Jorge Villalba, Federico Luppi and Pepe Soriano in La Patagonia rebelde (1974), directed by Héctor Olivera.

Argentina thus became both an exception and a battlefield. While neighboring Uruguay and Bolivia had already succumbed to authoritarian counteroffensives, Cámpora's May 1973 victory and Perón's subsequent electoral triumph with nearly two-thirds of the vote created a climate of massive political participation. The atmosphere was symbolized in cinema by Leonardo Favio's Juan Moreira, released on the eve of Cámpora's inauguration, which struck a chord with audiences by revisiting themes of social injustice through the figure of the marginalized gaucho. Its commercial success owed less to cinematic qualities than to the mood of national liberation that animated large sectors of workers, intellectuals and the petite bourgeoisie.

Within this context, the INC and the Ente initiated a radically different cultural policy. Getino's 90 day tenure at the Ente was conceived as an "unprecedented experience" of counter-censorship. He convened a multidisciplinary advisory council—including filmmakers, critics, psychologists, sociologists, religious figures and labor representatives—intended to replace the "moralist" leagues that had previously dominated censorship bodies. He organized public screenings at cultural institutions and unions where audiences debated films before they were classified, giving spectators an unprecedented sense of autonomy. At the same time, the Ente authorized works that had long been banned or delayed, ranging from La hora de los hornos to international films by Godard, Pasolini, Kubrick, Bertolucci and Costa-Gavras. The most controversial case was Bertolucci's Last Tango in Paris, whose October 1973 premiere sold out theaters but provoked judicial actions against Soffici and Getino, the seizure of prints, and repeated prosecutions that pursued Getino into exile.

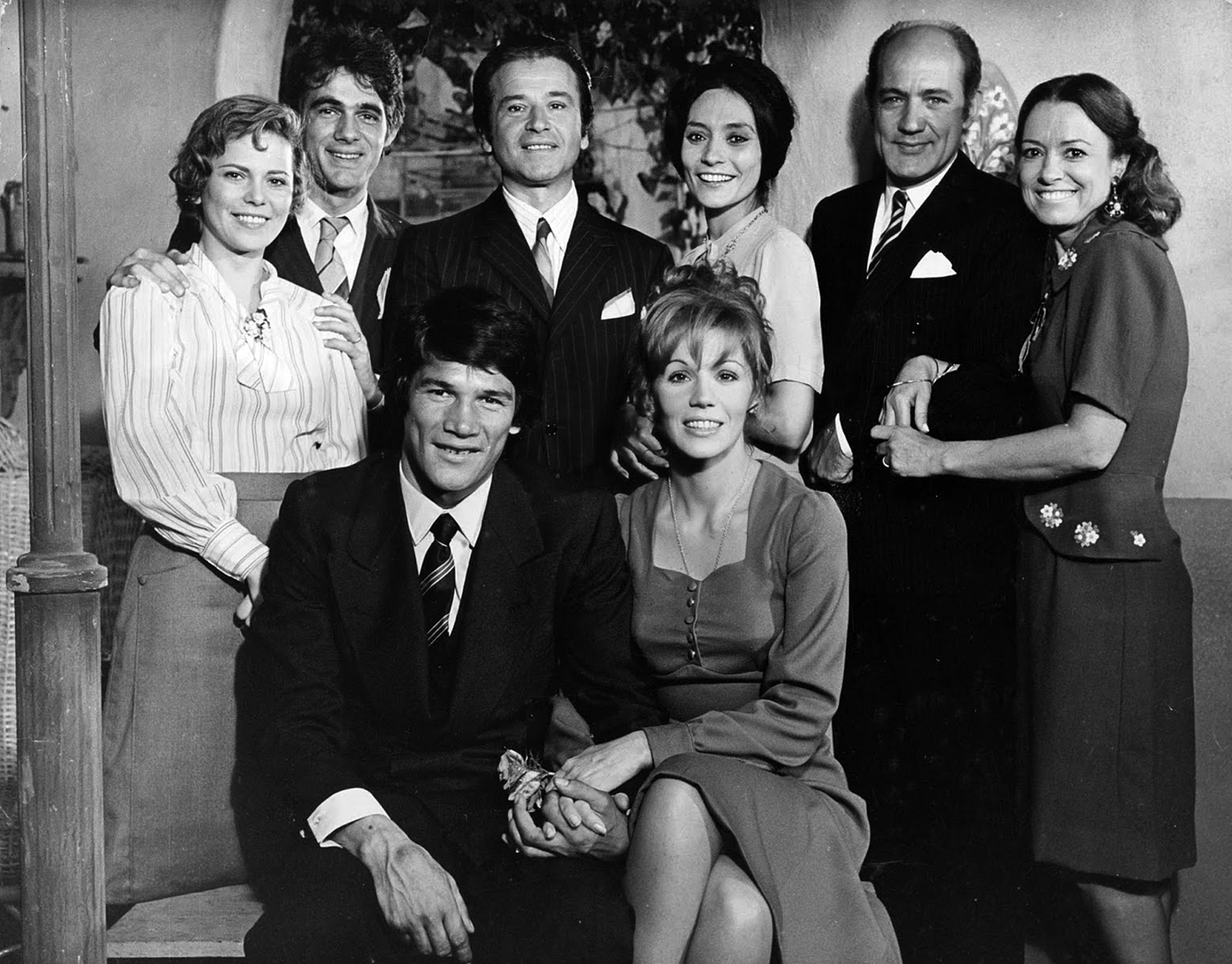
The cast of Daniel Tinayre's La Mary (1974). Sitted: Carlos Monzón and Susana Giménez. Standing up: Leonor Manso, Juan José Camero, Alberto Argibay, Dora Baret, Jorge Rivera López and Olga Zubarry.

The INC's agenda was equally ambitious. Soffici encouraged broad union renewal: SICA elected new leadership, the directors' guild incorporated younger figures, and independent producers organized through the newly created Asociación de Productores de Películas Independientes. A coalition of filmmakers—among them Fernando Solanas, Rodolfo Kuhn, René Mugica, Humberto Ríos and Alejandro Saderman—met under the banner of the Frente de Liberación del Cine Nacional. Together with INC officials, they drafted an advanced Film Law that proposed a far-reaching restructuring of the industry: greater state intervention in production and exhibition, quotas to guarantee one Argentine film for every six foreign releases, a ticket surcharge to fund new projects, regionalized production circuits, improved technical training, and stronger integration with Latin American markets. The project, endorsed by Isabel Perón in August 1974, was submitted to Congress but soon shelved.

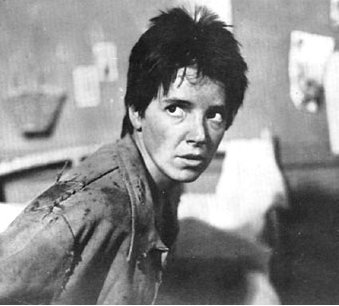
Marilina Ross in La Raulito (1975), directed by Lautaro Murúa.

Meanwhile, industrial production indicators improved. After averaging 29 domestic releases per year between 1955 and 1970, Argentine cinema released 42 features in 1973 and 39–40 in 1974. Attendance also grew sharply, with 1973 showing a 12% increase over the previous year and 1974 reaching 40% higher admissions. Popular audiences, long marginalized from theaters, returned in large numbers. The renewal was reflected in films that combined commercial success with political resonance: Héctor Olivera's La Patagonia rebelde, which denounced the 1921 massacres of striking workers, became a major box-office hit despite opposition from the armed forces; Ricardo Wullicher's Quebracho explored foreign domination in the Littoral; and Lautaro Murúa's La Raulito portrayed the struggles of a marginalized woman. At the same time, filmmakers such as Jorge Prelorán deepened anthropological documentary practices, while younger directors produced works that blurred the line between underground experimentation and political cinema, including Julio Ludueña's La civilización está haciendo masa and Edgardo Cozarinsky's Puntos suspensivos.

The momentum was fragile. Perón's death on 1 July 1974 brought to power María Estela Martínez and José López Rega, who quickly curtailed the reformist initiatives of the previous year. The Triple A intensified repression with threats, bombings and assassinations that drove many artists into exile. In cinema, the change was symbolized by the appointment of Miguel Paulino Tato as interventor of the Ente de Calificación in August 1974. Known as "Señor Tijeras" (transl. Mr. Scissors), Tato reimposed severe restrictions, oversaw the banning of films previously liberated, and remained in his post under the military dictatorship, becoming the most notorious censor in Argentine history. The shelving of the Film Law, the suppression of union activity and the reappearance of systematic censorship marked the end of what had been described as the "Camporist spring".

=== 1976–1983: During the last civic-military dictatorship ===
From 1975 onward, production fell sharply: 32 features were made in 1975, but only 16 in 1976, with partial recovery to 31 in 1979. The sector shifted toward low-quality comedies, light entertainment and commercial vehicles, while respected directors like Leopoldo Torre Nilsson and Leonardo Favio struggled with censorship or box-office failures. Studios such as Argentina Sono Film closed, Aries reoriented its production to broad commercial comedies, and rising ticket prices narrowed audiences to wealthier urban publics, with neighborhood theaters disappearing. Foreign distributors, particularly U.S. companies, consolidated dominance, recording a 59.9% revenue increase in Argentina between 1977 and 1978. Filmmakers were exiled, disappeared, or killed: Raymundo Gleyzer was abducted in 1976, Enrique Juárez was murdered, and Jorge Cedrón died in exile under suspicious circumstances.

Heavily censored from 1975 until about 1980, Argentine film-makers generally limited themselves to light-hearted subjects. Among the productions during that era was Héctor Olivera's adaptation of Roberto Cossa's play, La nona (Grandma, 1979). The dark comedy became a reference to the foreign debt interest payments that later saddled the Argentine economy. One director who, even as a supporter of the military regime, delved into middle-class neuroses with frankness was Fernando Siro, an inventive film-maker seemingly insensitive to many of his colleagues' tribulations, many of whom were forced to leave during the dictatorship. Though his attitudes distanced him from his peers and public, his 1981 tragedy Venido a menos ("Dilapidated") continues to be influential.

Following a loosening of restrictions in 1980, muck-raking cinema began to make itself evident on the Argentine screen. Plunging head-long into subjects like corruption and impunity (without directly indicting those in power), Adolfo Aristarain's Tiempo de revancha ("Time for Revenge", 1981), Fernando Ayala's Plata dulce ("Sweet Money," 1982) and Eduardo Calcagno's Los enemigos ("The Enemies," 1983) took hard looks at labor rights abuses, corporate corruption and the day's prevailing climate of fear at a time when doing so was often perilous. Petty corruption was also brought up in Fernando Ayala's El Arreglo ("The Deal," 1983).

=== 1983–1994: After the return to democracy ===
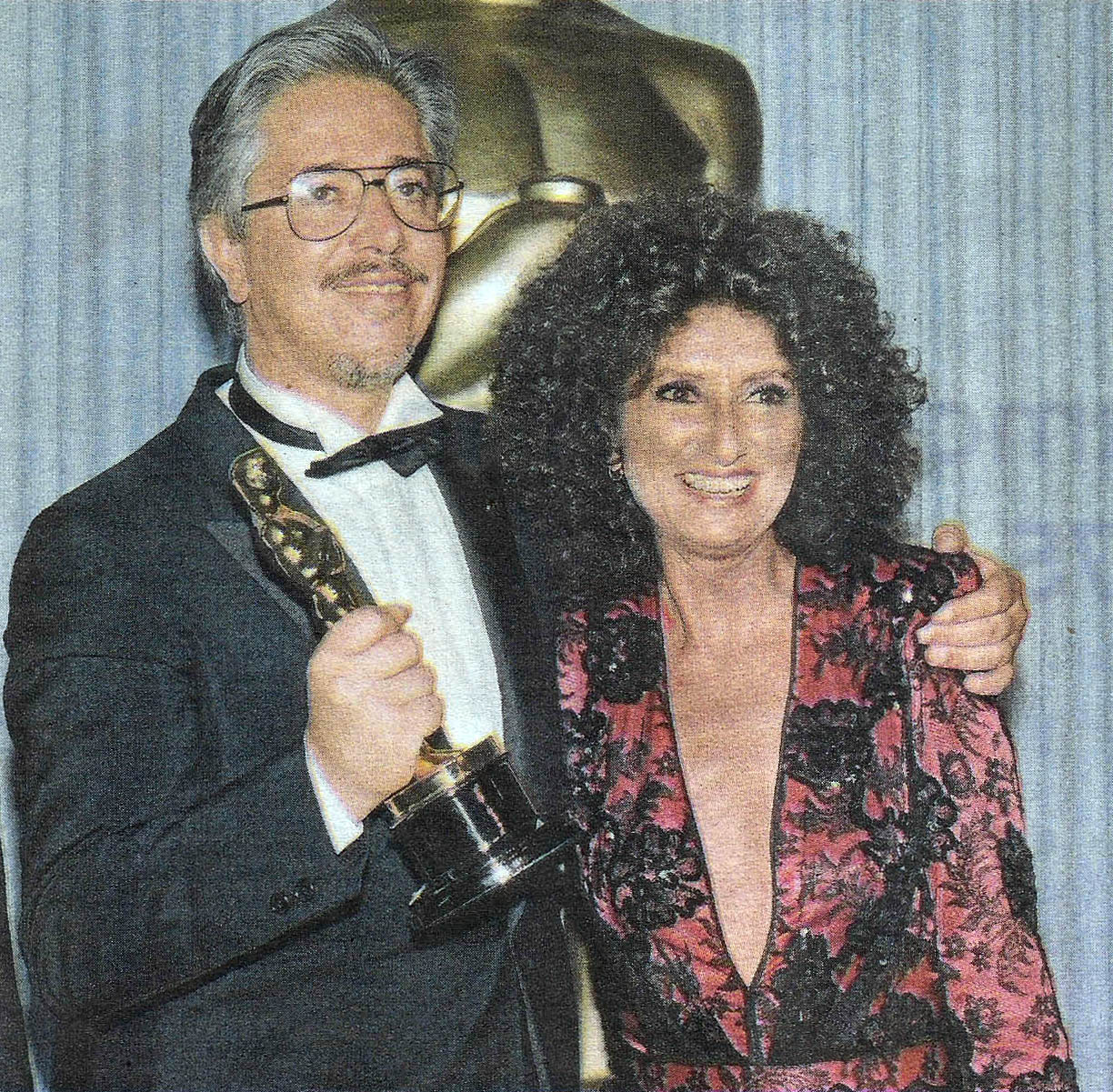
Luis Puenzo and Norma Aleandro after receiving the Oscar for Best Foreign Language Film for La historia oficial (1985) at the 58th Academy Awards.

A new era in Argentine cinema started after the arrival of democracy in 1983; besides a few memorable exceptions like Alejandro Doria's family comedy Esperando la carroza ("Waiting for the Hearse", 1985), the era saw a marked decline in the popularity of slapstick comedies towards films with more serious undertones and subject matter.

The first group deals frankly with the repression, torture and the disappearances during the Dirty War in the 1970s and early 1980s. They include: Hector Olivera's Funny Little Dirty War (1983) and the true story Night of the Pencils (1986); Luis Puenzo's Academy Award-winning The Official Story (1985); "Pino" Solanas' Tangos, the Exile of Gardel (1986) and Sur ("South", 1987) and Alejandro Doria's harrowing Sofia (1987), among others.

Among films dealing with past abuses, one German-Argentine co-production that also deserves mention is Jeanine Meerapfel's The Girlfriend (1988), where Norwegian leading lady Liv Ullmann is cast beside locals Federico Luppi, Cipe Lincovski, Victor Laplace and Lito Cruz.

A second group of films includes portrayals of exile and homesickness, like Alberto Fischermann's Los días de junio ("Days in June," 1985) and Juan Jose Jusid's Made in Argentina (1986), as well as plots rich in subtext, like Miguel Pereira's Verónico Cruz (1988), Gustavo Mosquera's Lo que vendrá ("The Near Future", 1988) and a cult favorite, Martin Donovan's English-language Apartment Zero (1988). These used metaphor, life's imponderables and hints at wider socio-political issues to reconcile audiences with recent events.

This can also be said of treatments of controversial literature and painful 19th century history like Maria Luisa Bemberg's Camila (1984), Carlos Sorin's A King and His Movie (1985) and Eliseo Subiela's Man Facing Southeast (1986).

=== 1994–2015: New legislation and stylistic renovation ===
The mid-1990s brought another New Argentine Cinema wave. In 1991, Marco Bechis' Alambrado ("Chicken Wire") was released. That same year, activist film-maker Fernando "Pino" Solanas released his third major film, The Journey (1992), a surreal overview of prevailing social conditions in Latin America. Existential angst continued to dominate the Argentine film agenda, however, with Eliseo Subiela's El lado oscuro del corazon ("Dark Side of the Heart," 1992) and Adolfo Aristarain's A Place in the World (1992) – notable also for its having been nominated for an Oscar.

Later in the 1990s, the focus began to shift towards Argentina's mounting social problems, such as rising homelessness and crime. Alejandro Agresti's Buenos Aires vice versa (1996) rescued the beauty of feelings in the shadows of poverty in Buenos Aires and Bruno Stagnaro's Pizza, Beer, and Cigarettes (1997) looked into the human duality of even the most incorrigible and violent individuals.

Drawing on Argentina's history and cultural heritage, directors continued to make period dramas such as Eduardo Mignogna's Flop (1990), María Luisa Bemberg's De eso no se habla (You Don't Discuss Certain Things, 1993), which featured Marcello Mastroianni in one of his final roles, and Santiago Oves' adaptation of Rodolfo Walsh's Agatha Christie-influenced story Asesinato a distancia (Murder from a Distance, 1998). Biographical films from the period included Leonardo Favio's Gatica, el mono (1993), about boxer José María Gatica, and Javier Torre's Lola Mora (1996), about the Argentine sculptor.

Political history was re-examined with films like Eduardo Calcagno's controversial take on 1970s-era Argentine film censor Paulino Tato (played by Argentina's most prolific character actor, Ulises Dumont) in El Censor (1995), Juan J. Jusid's indictment of the old compulsory military training system, Bajo Bandera ("At Half Mast," 1997), Marco Bechis' Garage Olimpo (1999), which took viewers into one of the dictatorship's most brutal torture dungeons and Juan Carlos Desanzo's answer to Madonna's Evita, his 1996 Eva Perón (a portrait of a far more complex first lady than the one Andrew Lloyd Webber had taken up).

Popular culture had its turn on the Argentine screen. Alejandro Doria's Cien veces no debo ("I Don't Owe You Forever," 1990) took an irreverent peek into a typical middle-class Argentine home, Jose Santiso's De mi barrio con amor ("From My Neighborhood, with Love," 1996) is a must-see for anyone planning to visit Buenos Aires' bohemian southside and Rodolfo Pagliere's El día que Maradona conoció a Gardel ("The Day Maradona Met Gardel," 1996) is an inventive ode to two standards of Argentine culture.

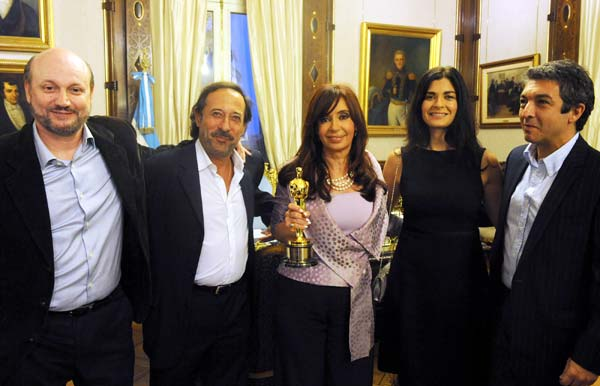
President Cristina Fernández and the cast of The Secret in Their Eyes (2009) with the Oscar for Best Foreign Language Film.

Films such as Fabian Bielinsky's twister Nine Queens (2000), his gothic El Aura (2005) and Juan José Campanella's teary Son of the Bride (2001) have received praise and awards around the world. Juan Carlos Desanzo cast Miguel Ángel Solá (best known for his role in Tango) as the immortal Jorge Luis Borges in El Amor y el Espanto ("Love and Foreboding", 2001), a look at the writer's struggles with Perón-era intimidation as well as with his own insecurities.

Always politically active, Argentine film continues to treat hard subjects, like Spanish director Manane Rodríguez's look at abducted children, The Lost Steps (2001) and "Pino" Solanas' perhaps definitive film on the 2001 economic crisis, Memorias del saqueo ("Memories of the Riot", 2004). Tristán Bauer took audiences back to soldiers' dehumanizing Falklands War experience with Blessed by Fire (2005) and Adrián Caetano follows four football players through their 1977 escape from certain death in Chronicle of an Escape (2006).

Lucrecia Martel's 2001 debut feature film La ciénaga ("The Swamp"), about an indulgent bourgeois extended family spending the summertime in a decrepit vacation home in Salta, was internationally highly acclaimed upon release and introduced a new and vital voice to Argentine cinema. For film scholar David Oubiña, it is "one of the highest achievements" of the New Argentine Cinema, coincidentally timed with Argentina's political and economic crisis that it "became a rare expression of an extremely troubled moment in the nation's recent history. It is a masterpiece of singular maturity". Martel's succeeding films would also receive further international acclaim, such as the adolescent drama The Holy Girl (2004), the psychological thriller The Headless Woman (2008), and the period drama adaptation Zama (2017).

Responding to its sentimental public, Argentine film at times returns to subjects of the heart. David Lipszyc's grainy portrait of depression-era Argentina, El astillero ("The Shipyard", 2000) was a hit with critics, Paula Hernandez's touching ode to immigrants, Inheritance (2001), has become something of a sleeper, Adolfo Aristarain's Common Places (2002) follows an elderly professor into retirement, Cleopatra (2003), Eduardo Mignona's tale of an unlikely friendship, received numerous awards, as did Carlos Sorín's touching El perro ("The Dog", 2004). Emotional negativity, a staple for filmmakers anywhere, was explored in Mario Sabato's India Pravile (2003), Francisco D'Intino's La esperanza (2005) and Ariel Rotter's El otro ("The Other", 2007) each deals with mid-life crises in very different ways. The pronounced sentimentality of the average Argentine was also the subject of Robert Duvall's 2002 Assassination Tango, a deceptively simple crime drama that shows that still waters do, indeed, run deep.

Buffeted by years of economic malaise and encroachment of the domestic film market by foreign (mainly, US) titles, the Argentine film industry has been supported by the 1987 creation of the National Institute of Cinema and Audioviual Arts (INCAA), a publicly subsidized film underwriter that, since 1987, has produced 130 full-length art house titles.

The decade ended on a high with the 2009 film The Secret in Their Eyes receiving critical praise, winning the Oscar for Best Foreign Language Film at the 82nd Academy Awards, three weeks after being awarded the Goya Award for Best Spanish Language Foreign Film of 2009.

In 2014, the anthology film Wild Tales (Relatos Salvajes in Spanish) directed by Damián Szifron was nominated for the Best Foreign Language Film at the 87th Academy Awards, and won the Goya Award for Best Iberoamerican Film.

=== 2015–present: Successes and financing crises ===
In 2022, Argentina, 1985, directed by Santiago Mitre was nominated for Best International Feature Film at the 95th Academy Awards, and Best Film Not in the English Language at the 76th BAFTA Awards. The film won Best Foreign Language Film at the 80th Golden Globe Awards.

Following the onset of the Milei administration, Argentine cinema was eroded by the hollowing out of the INCAA and the proposal of Reform of the Labour Law, to which the progressive disappearance of domestic titles from commercial theatres added up. The Argentine film industry entered 2026 in a dire situation, and exhibitor Showcase Cinemas evaluated selling operations in the country in a context of declining admissions, changes in consumption patterns, and a shrinking market. The institutional crisis prompted Argentine filmmakers to look for financing and legitimacy abroad.

== Argentine films ==
- For an A-Z list of Argentine films currently on Wikipedia see Category:Argentine films.
- For a timeline of Argentine films see List of Argentine films

== Argentine film companies ==
- EMB Entertainment, Corp. / Contrakultura
- Aleph Producciones
- Aqua Films
- Argentina Sono Film
- Aries Cinematográfica Argentina
- BD Cine
- INCAA
- Patagonik Film Group
- Pol-ka

== Argentine scenographers ==
- Saulo Benavente
- Carlos Gianni

== See also ==
- The 100 Greatest Films of Argentine Cinema
- Latin American cinema
- Lists of Argentine films
- List of Argentine submissions for the Academy Award for Best International Feature Film
- List of Argentine Academy Award winners and nominees

== Bibliography ==
- Di Núbila, Domingo (1998). La época de oro. Historia del cine argentino I (in Spanish). Buenos Aires: Ediciones del Jilguero. ISBN 978-987-957-865-0.
- Finkielman, Jorge (2004). The Film Industry in Argentina: An Illustrated Cultural History. McFarland & Company, Inc. ISBN 978-078-641-628-8 – via the Internet Archive.
- Getino, Octavio (2005). Cine argentino: entre lo posible y lo deseable (in Spanish). Buenos Aires: Ediciones CICCUS. ISBN 978-987-935-524-4 – via Red de Historia de los Medios (ReHiMe) on Issuu.
- Karush, Matthew B. (2012). Culture of Class: Radio and Cinema in the Making of a Divided Argentina, 1920–1946. Duke University Press. ISBN 978-082-235-264-8 – via Google Books.
- Lusnich, Ana Laura (2007). El drama social folclórico. El universo rural en el cine argentino (in Spanish). Prologue by Claudio España. Buenos Aires: Editorial Biblos. ISBN 978-950-786-613-5 – via the Internet Archive.
- Mafud, Lucio (2016). La imagen ausente. El cine mudo argentino en publicaciones gráficas. Catálogo. El cine de ficción (1914-1923). (Investigaciones de la Biblioteca Nacional (in Spanish). Buenos Aires: Biblioteca Nacional; Editorial Teseo. ISBN 978-987-723-096-3.
- Mahieu, José Agustín (1966). Breve historia del cine argentino (in Spanish). Buenos Aires: Editorial Universitaria de Buenos Aires.
- Manetti, Ricardo; Rodríguez Riva, Lucía, eds. (2014). 30-50-70. Conformación, crisis y renovación del cine industrial argentino y latinoamericano (PDF) (in Spanish). Buenos Aires: Editorial de la Facultad de Filosofía y Letras. Universidad de Buenos Aires. ISBN 978-987-361-714-0.
- Maranghello, César (2005). Breve Historia del Cine Argentino (in Spanish). Laertes editorial, S.A. p. 159. ISBN 978-84-7584-532-6.
- Peña, Fernando Martín (2012). Cien años de cine argentino (eBook) (in Spanish). Buenos Aires: Editorial Biblos. ISBN 978-987-691-098-9.
- Rist, Peter H. (2014). Historical Dictionary of South American Cinema. Rowman & Littlefield. ISBN 978-081-088-036-8 – via Google Books.
- Schumann, Peter B. (1987). Historia del cine latinoamericano (in Spanish). Buenos Aires: Legasa. ISBN 978-950-600-099-8.
