= Amalia (1936 film) =

1936 film

- Directed by: Luis Moglia Barth
- Written by: Luis Moglia Barth based on a novel by José Mármol
- Starring: Herminia Franco
- Release date: 1936
- Country: Argentina
- Language: Spanish

Amalia is a 1936 Argentine film of the Golden Age of Argentine cinema directed by Luis Moglia Barth. Barth also wrote the script based on the novel by José Mármol. The film is a remake of the 1914 film of the same name. The film starred Herminia Franco.

== Cast ==
- Herminia Franco as Amalia
- Floren Delbene
- Miguel Gómez Bao

== See also ==
- Amalia (1914 film)
