= Santos Vega (disambiguation) =

Santos Vega is a fictional Argentine gaucho

Santos Vega may also refer to:

- Santos Vega (1917 film), a 1917 Argentine silent historical film
- Santos Vega (1936 film), a 1936 Argentine historical film
- Santos Vega (1971 film), a 1971 Argentine historical film
