= Mario Gallo =

Mario Gallo may refer to:

- Mario Gallo (director) (1878–1945), Italian-born, Argentine film director
- Mario Gallo (actor) (1923–1984), American film and television actor
