= Amalia (1914 film) =

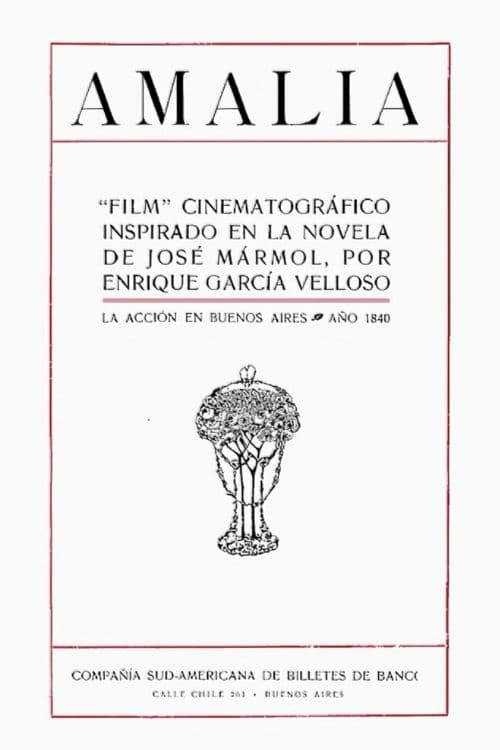
- Cover of the programme of the film's premiere at the Teatro Colón.
- Directed by: Enrique García Velloso
- Written by: Enrique García Velloso
- Based on: Amalia (1851−1855) by José Mármol
- Produced by: Asociación del Divino Rostro; Max Glücksmann
- Cinematography: Eugenio Py; Enrique Luchetti (probably)
- Release date: December 12, 1914
- Running time: 3,000 meters (164 minutes approx.)
- Country: Argentina
- Language: Silent (Spanish intertitles)

Amalia is a 1914 Argentine silent historical drama film directed and written by playwright Enrique García Velloso, produced by Max Glücksmann and photographed by Eugenio Py, based on the 1851−1855 novel of the same name by José Mármol. The film was an initiative of the charity society Asociación del Divino Rostro, and the characters were played by a long list of members of Buenos Aires' elite. The film's premiere on 12 December 1914 was an unprecedented event for national filmmaking, as it took place at the Teatro Colón, the most prestigious venue for the high society and aristocracy of Buenos Aires, with the presence of President Victorino de la Plaza and his ministers.

Contrary to popular belief, Amalia was not Argentina's first feature-length film, nor did it represent a stylistic breakthrough, as Nelly o la prima pobre was released the previous year, a 60-minute production sponsored by and starring members of elite charitable societies. Nevertheless, Amalia was the longest film up to that time, with an original running time of 3,000 meters, and is also the oldest surviving feature film of the country.

== Cast ==
- Dora Huergo as La Negra
- Lola Marcó del Pont as Señora Dupasquier

== Bibliography ==
- Mafud, Lucio (2016). La imagen ausente. El cine mudo argentino en publicaciones gráficas. Catálogo. El cine de ficción (1914-1923). (Investigaciones de la Biblioteca Nacional (in Spanish). Buenos Aires: Biblioteca Nacional; Editorial Teseo. ISBN 978-987-723-096-3.
- Peña, Fernando Martín (2012). Cien años de cine argentino (eBook) (in Spanish). Buenos Aires: Editorial Biblos. ISBN 978-987-691-098-9.
