= El fusilamiento de Dorrego =

- Directed by: Mario Gallo
- Written by: Mario Gallo
- Produced by: Mario Gallo
- Starring: Salvador Rosich; Eliseo Gutiérrez; Roberto Casaux
- Release date: 24 May 1908 (Argentina)
- Running time: 10-12 minutes
- Country: Argentina
- Language: Spanish

El fusilamiento de Dorrego (The Execution of Dorrego) is a 1908 Argentine film written and directed by Mario Gallo and starring Salvador Rosich, Eliseo Gutiérrez, and Roberto Casaux. It depicts the 1828 death of statesman Manuel Dorrego, played by Rosich.

It is considered to be a lost film.

== Production ==
The director Mario Gallo, an Italian who had arrived in Argentina in 1905, began shooting the country's first fiction films in 1908. The traditional account, endorsed by film researcher and historian Pablo C. Ducrós Hicken, is that El fusilamiento de Dorrego was released on 24 May 1908. Other researchers date its filming two years later, which would make 1909's La Revolución de Mayo the first.

Filming took place on the terrace of the Teatro Nuevo and in the Palermo Woods of Buenos Aires.

== Legacy ==
Some scholars see in Gallo's film work the influence of Film d'Art, which since 1908 had been France's first approach to cinema as art, moving it away from the mere spectacle of the fairground. This had its first expression in The Assassination of the Duke of Guise, a film that also had the distinction of being the first to feature original music.

Pablo C. Ducrós Hicken, who viewed El fusilamiento de Dorrego in the 1920s, compared it favorably with contemporary Pathé films, and described it as "well composed". However, some other accounts mention audience members laughing at inconsistencies such as cars passing by in the background of a scene ostensibly set in the 1820s.
