= Amalia (novel) =

1851 novel by José Mármol

Amalia is a 19th-century political novel written by the exiled Argentine author José Mármol. First published serially in the Montevideo weekly, Amalia (1851) became Argentina's national novel. Along with Domingo Faustino Sarmiento's Facundo, Amalia can be seen as an early precursor to the Latin American dictator novel through its strong criticism of caudillo Juan Manuel de Rosas, who ruled Argentina with a strong fist from 1829 to 1852.

Set in post-colonial Buenos Aires, Amalia was written in two parts and is a semi-autobiographical account of José Mármol that deals with living in Rosas's police state. Mármol's novel was important as it showed how the human consciousness, much like a city or even a country, could become a terrifying prison. Amalia also attempted to examine the problem of dictatorships as being one of structure, and therefore the problem of the state "manifested through the will of some monstrous personage violating the ordinary individual's privacy, both of home and of consciousness."

== See also ==
- Amalia (1914 film)
- Amalia (1936 film)
