= Emilia Saleny =

Argentine director and actress

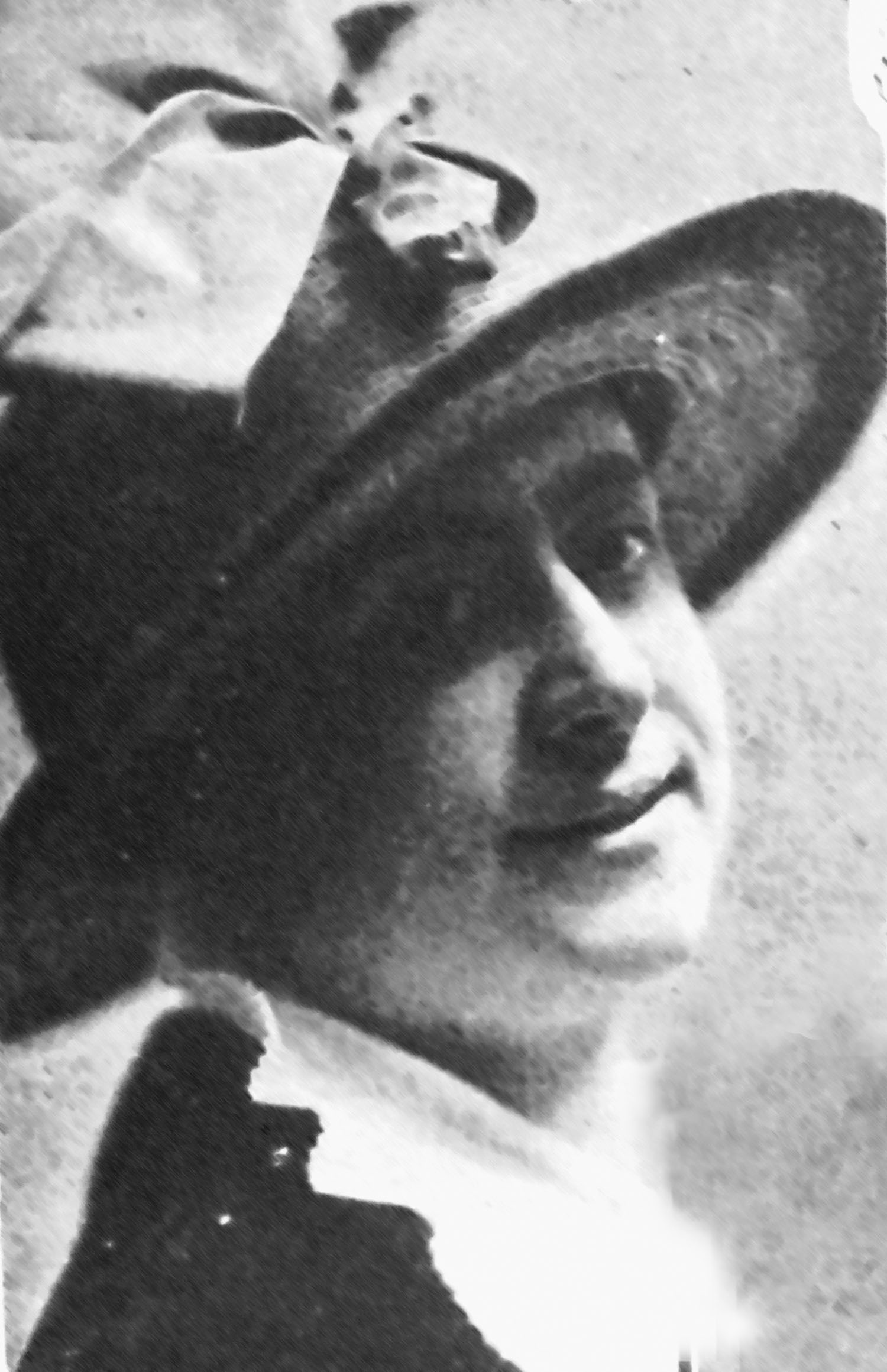
- In the magazine Caras y Caretas in 1915
- Born: Josefina Emilia Saleny; 16 October 1894; Buenos Aires, Argentina
- Died: 22 August 1978 (aged 83); Buenos Aires, Argentina
- Occupation(s): Film director, actress, teacher
- Spouse: Alberto Olivero

Josefina Emilia Saleny (16 October 1894 – 22 August 1978) was an Argentine film director, actress, and teacher.

== Biography ==
Emilia Saleny was born in Buenos Aires on 16 October 1894, the daughter of Antonio Saleny and Italian actress Victoria Pieri. (Note: Some sources give her birthdate as 26 June.) Her uncles were also Italian actors. She traveled to Italy in 1910 to study acting, and returned to Buenos Aires at the outbreak of World War I in 1914.

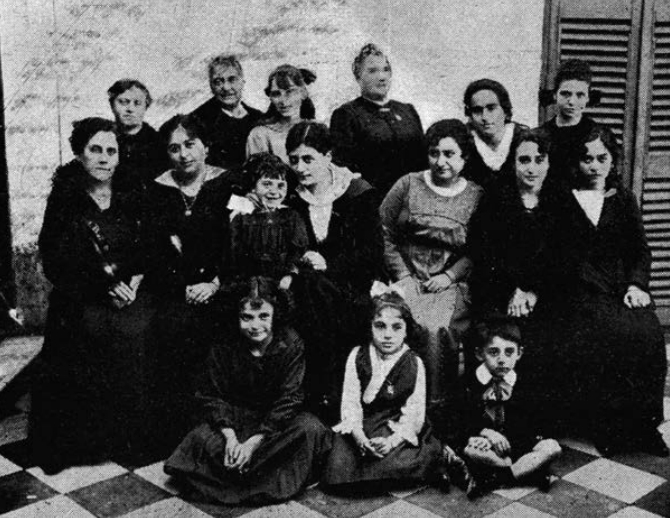
Saleny with graduates from her academy

She worked as an actress at the Teatro Apolo in 1915. She also founded an academy for film acting, which was described as the most serious and reliable of all those in Buenos Aires by critics of the film magazine La Película.

In 1917, Saleny directed the silent films Paseo trágico and La niña del bosque. The latter was aimed at children, and starred students from her academy, including 11-year-old Titi Garimaldi. With these, she became one of Argentina's first women film directors. (Note: Saleny's Paseo trágico, La niña del bosque, or El pañuelo de Clarita are sometimes listed as the first Argentine film directed by a woman. According to researcher Lucio Mafud, newspapers of the time state that Angélica García Mansilla had directed the film Un romance argentino in 1915.) She has been cited as the forerunner of filmmakers such as María B. de Celestini and Vlasta Lah.

She directed El pañuelo de Clarita in 1919, from a screenplay by Bautista Amé, which was shown in Buenos Aires and Ingeniero Luiggi. She may have also directed Delfina in 1917 and Luchas en la vida in 1919, though her exact role in the productions is unclear.

As an actress, she appeared in the now-lost film El evadido de Ushuaia, directed by Luis Ramassotto, produced by Cóndor Film, and released on 27 December 1916. The same year, she acted in América, directed by Federico Mertens, and the following year, Problemas del corazón. She was artistic director of the 1920 play Cantos rodados by Francisco Imhoff.

Emilia Saleny died at her home in Buenos Aires on 22 August 1978.

== Filmography ==
=== As director ===
- 1917: La niña del bosque
- 1917: Paseo trágico
- 1917: Delfina
- 1919: Luchas en la vida
- 1919: El pañuelo de Clarita

=== As actress ===
- 1916: El evadido de Ushuaia
- 1917: América
- 1917: Problemas del corazón
