= Mario Gallo (director) =

Italian-born Argentine film director

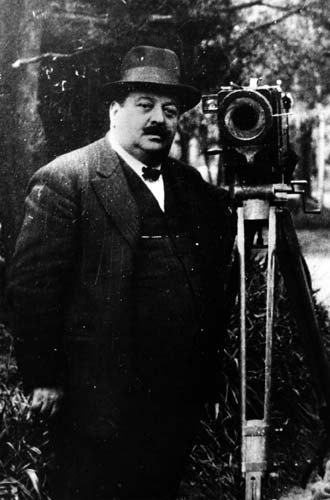
Mario Gallo

Mario Gallo (July 31, 1878 – October 2, 1945) was an Italian-born, Argentine film director of the 1900s and 1910s and one of the early directors in the cinema of Argentina. He directed what is nowadays considered the country's first fiction feature movie, El fusilamiento de Dorrego, now lost.

Born in Barletta, Apulia, southern Italy, Gallo arrived in Argentina in 1905 and began directing in 1909 El fusilamiento de Dorrego, which he presented a year later. Argentine cinema had so far consisted of shorts depicting parts of Buenos Aires and even a documentary by Eugène Py, in 1900, but Gallo's film was the first to be a feature work of fiction. In later years, Gallo claimed to have filmed other films first, all equally lost and of which remained no evidence. Gallo's films consisted of short glimpses of reenacted Argentine history - historical events, myths and battles.

He died at Buenos Aires on October 2, 1945.

== Filmography ==
- En Buena Ley (1919)
- En un Día de Gloria (1918)
- Juan Moreira (1913)
- Tierra baja (1912)
- Batalla de Maipú (1912)
- La Batalla de San Lorenzo (1912)
- La Revolución de Mayo (1910)
- La creación del himno (1910)
- Güemes y sus gauchos (1910)
- Muerte civil (1910)
- Camila O'Gorman (1909)
- El fusilamiento de Dorrego (1908)
