= José Mármol =

Argentine journalist, politician, librarian and writer

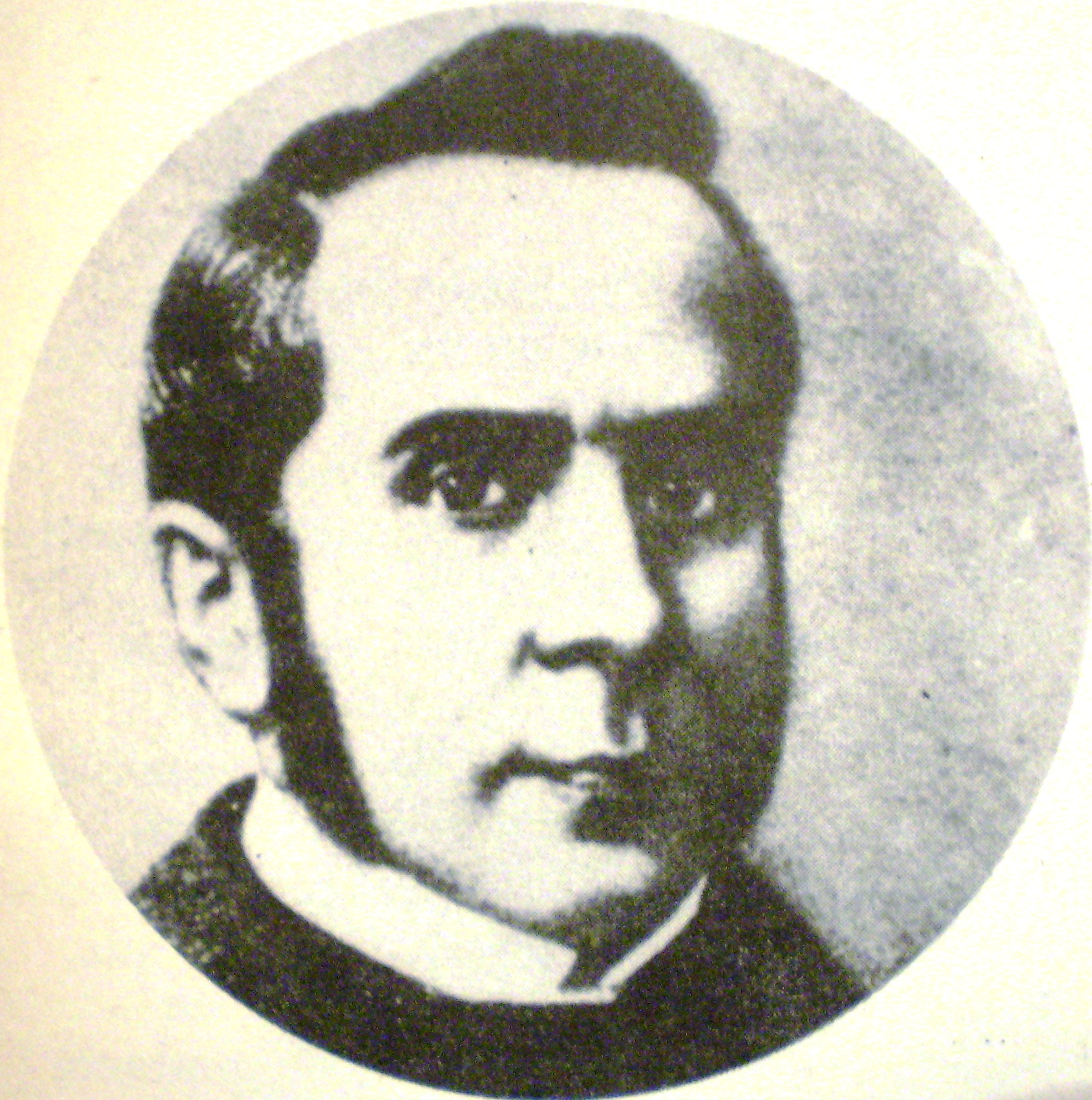
José Mármol

José Mármol (1817 – 1871) was an Argentine journalist, politician, librarian, and writer of the Romantic school.

== Biography ==
Born in Buenos Aires, he initially studied law, but abandoned his studies in favor of politics. In 1839, no sooner had he begun to make a name for himself than he was arrested for his opposition to Argentina's conservative caudillo, Juan Manuel de Rosas. He was held in irons for six days. A year and a half later, the political climate spurred him, as it had many other Argentine dissenters, to flee the country. He found passage to Montevideo on a French schooner. He was welcomed by other exiles, among them Juan Bautista Alberdi, Florencio Varela, Esteban Echeverría, Juan María Gutiérrez, and Miguel Cané. Three years later, the siege of Montevideo by Rosas's ally Manuel Oribe led Mármol to flee yet again, this time to Rio de Janeiro. Here he remained until February 1843, at which point he boarded a ship for Chile. The ship encountered fierce storms and was eventually forced to return to Rio de Janeiro. He remained in the city another two years before returning to Montevideo, where he spent the next seven years.

The fall of Rosas after his defeat at the Battle of Caseros (1852) allowed Mármol to return to Argentina. After an exile that had lasted thirteen years, he was elected a senator and later a national deputy from the province of Buenos Aires. The secession of Buenos Aires from the Argentine Confederation prevented him from serving as plenipotentiary to Chile, a post to which he had been appointed. However, he later served as plenipotentiary to Brazil. In 1858 he became director of the Biblioteca Nacional de la República Argentina, until blindness forced him to retire. He died in Buenos Aires in 1871. By coincidence, his two most notable successors in the office of chief librarian, Paul Groussac and Jorge Luis Borges, also suffered from blindness in their old age.

== Work ==
During his time in Montevideo, Mármol founded three journals, most notable among them being La Semana, and he contributed to many others. He earned a reputation as a passionate critic of Rosas and his supporters, and the sobriquet el verdugo poético de Rosas ("the poetic hangman of Rosas"). In fact, his best known poem, A Rosas, el 25 de Mayo de 1843 (To Rosas, 25 May 1843), composed of alexandrine lines, is a vivid, fierce invective against the dictator. Abusive political content is indeed not absent from his work, whatever the genre. Also characteristic of Mármol are his unique descriptive sensibility and his treatment of love.

In Uruguay in 1847 he published six of what would eventually be twelve cantos of El Peregrino ("The Pilgrim"), a long autobiographical poem set to the rhythm of his changing fortunes, which drew heavily from Byron's Childe Harold's Pilgrimage.

His lyric poems were collected into Armonías (Montevideo, 1851). In 1844 he published the first part of his semi-autobiographical Costumbrist novel Amalia, whose second part would not appear until his return to Buenos Aires years later. In 1914, Amalia was adapted into the first full-length Argentine film. Mármol's works for the stage were El Poeta (1847) and El Cruzado (1851). His style shows the influence of many Romanticists, not only Byron but also Chateaubriand, José de Espronceda, and José Zorrilla.

== Bibliography ==
- El peregrino (1847)
- El poeta (1847)
- Manuela Rosas (1849)
- Armonías (1851)
- El cruzado (1851)
- Amalia (1851)

== Sources ==
- Brief biography and bibliography
