= Santos Vega (1917 film) =

- Directed by: Carlos de Paoli
- Written by: Rafael Obligado (poem); Carlos de Paoli
- Release date: 17 June 1917
- Country: Argentina
- Languages: Silent; Spanish intertitles

Santos Vega is a 1917 Argentine silent historical film directed by Carlos de Paoli. It is based on the story of the legendary gaucho Santos Vega.

== Cast ==
- José Juan Podestá as Santos Vega
- Ignacio Corsini

== Bibliography ==
- Finkielman, Jorge. The Film Industry in Argentina: An Illustrated Cultural History. McFarland, 2003.
