= La Revolución de Mayo =

- Starring: Mario Gallo
- Release date: 1910
- Country: Argentina

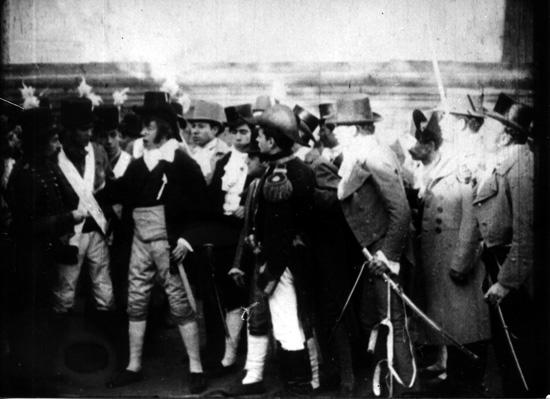

La Revolución de Mayo (in Spanish, The May Revolution) is an Argentine silent movie made in 1909 and premiered in 1910. As the name denotes, it is focused on the events of the May Revolution, whose centennial took place by then. It was directed by Mario Gallo, and it was the first Argentine film made with professional actors.
