= Max Glücksmann =

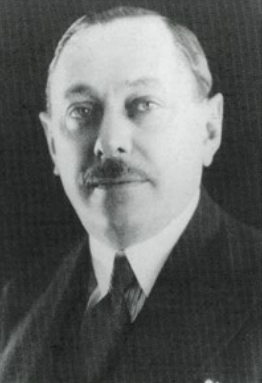

Max Glücksmann (born Mordechai David Glücksmann) (Czernowitz, Bukovina, Austria-Hungary, March 8, 1875 – October 20, 1946, Buenos Aires, Argentina) was an Argentine pioneer of the music and film industries.

== Biography ==
Glücksmann was born in Czernowitz, then part of Austria-Hungary, and emigrated to Argentina in 1890.

Shortly after his arrival in Buenos Aires, Glücksmann began to work as a photographic assistant at the Casa Lepage, along with Eugène Py.

Soon after the foundation of Odeon Records in 1904, Glücksmann was appointed as the importation agent, in Argentina, for European machines and records. He was successful, and soon involved himself in making local records under his own name, Discos Glücksmann. Because of the distances involved, and possibly because of Glücksmann's nationality, Odeon agreed to build a processing and pressing plant for him in Buenos Aires, throwing in a resident Berlin-trained engineer for good measure. (These were the days, pre-World War I, when Argentina had one of the largest and fastest-growing economies in the world.)

Glücksmann set out to capture the tango market, a task he managed very successfully. By 1914 he had essentially gained overall control of the Argentine record industry, marginalising his only competitor, Victor, by the simple expedient of signing exclusive long-term contracts with the best musicians and, more cannily, the best song writers. Thus Glücksmann had exclusive copyrights to all the hits. Glücksmann controlled the sheet-music and silent movie house business, and had a virtual monopoly on tango until the 1920s. Far from making himself hated by this arrangement, he became a folk hero among musicians by his introduction of royalties, both in music-publishing and in record-making, for the first time in Argentina.

In November 1928 a factory for The Arg. Talking Mach. Works (covered area: 1690 square metres) was finished by architect Paul Ploetz, situated at Montañeses 2130/50 (CABA, now Barrio Chino). The building does not exist anymore.

Discos Glücksmann were Argentinized to Discos Nacional-Glücksmann, later simply to Discos Nacional and finally, after the foundation of EMI in 1931, to Disco Nacional-Odeon, the standard label in Argentina, Brazil and Uruguay for the products of Industrias Eléctricas y Musicales Odeón, S. A., i.e., Argentine EMI.

He died at 71 and is buried at Cementerio israelita de Ciudadela, Buenos Aires.
