= Padín =

Padín (Spanish pronunciation: [pa'ðin]) is a Galician and Spanish surname. It is a toponymic surname derived from any of the seven places of the same name in Galicia, Spain. Its etymology comes from the Latin word palatini, meaning palace.

Notable people with this surname include:

- Antonia Pérez Padín, Spanish feminist
- Cândido Rubens Padín (1915–2008), Brazilian bishop
- Laura Alonso Padín (born 1976), Spanish operatic soprano
- Margarita Padín (1910–1993), Argentinian stage and film actress
- María Padín (1888–1970), Uruguayan actress
- Ramón Allende Padín (1845–1884), Chilean physician

== See also ==
- Padin (disambiguation)
- Padden
