= Alberto Gainza Paz =

Argentinian journalist (1899–1977)

Alberto Gainza Paz (March 16, 1899 – December 26, 1977) was an Argentine journalist and political activist who served as editor of the newspaper La Prensa.

== Early life ==
Alberto de Gainza Paz was the eldest of four children born to Alberto de Gainza Lynch and Zelmira Rosa Paz Díaz in Buenos Aires. Both parents belonged to powerful families in Argentina; especially Zelmira, who was the daughter of José Clemente Paz (deputy, diplomat and founder of the newspaper La Prensa), and Zelmira Diaz Gallardo. Alberto, surrounded by powerful contacts and a member of high society in Buenos Aires, frequented many exclusive meetings and parties, and frequented the Hippodrome in Palermo.

In 1921, he received a law degree from the University of Buenos Aires. He married Elvira Castro Soto, and had 8 children: Elvira, Alberto, Maximo, Ezekiel, Joseph, Angelica, Zelmira Gainza and Jorge de Castro.

== Career ==
In 1943, Gainza Paz assumed the role of editor of the newspaper La Prensa from his uncle, Ezequiel Pedro Paz, who retired for health reasons.

La Prensa was suspended for five days in 1944, after criticizing the government's health program. Gainza Paz and five other newspaper editors were arrested in 1945, charged with conspiring against the government.

In January 1951, the Peronist government forced the newspaper to suspend publication, through its control of newspaper distribution. That March the Congress ordered the arrest of Gainza Paz, who was already in exile in Uruguay. In 1951, Paz was quoted in a New York newspaper: "I am not saying that what happened in my country might some day happen here, but I will warn you that it is much easier to fight to keep the freedoms you have than to fight to regain the freedoms you have lost."

He returned to La Prensa in 1956, the year after Juan Perón was deposed.
