= Nobleza gaucha =

Nobleza gaucha may refer to:

- Nobleza gaucha (1937 film), a 1937 Argentine film
- Nobleza gaucha (1915 film), a 1915 Argentine silent film
