= Melodías porteñas =

1937 film by Luis Moglia Barth

- Directed by: Luis Moglia Barth
- Written by: René Garzón, Luis Moglia Barth, Enrique Santos Discépolo
- Cinematography: Alberto Etchebehere
- Music by: Juan d'Arienzo, Enrique Santos Discépolo, José Vázquez Vigo
- Release date: November 17, 1937
- Running time: 76 minutes
- Country: Argentina
- Language: Spanish

Melodías porteñas (Buenos Aires Melodies) is a 1937 Argentine film, a musical directed by Luis Moglia Barth, who also co-wrote it. It is one of the most iconic films of the Golden Age of Argentine cinema. It is based on a struggling radio station, and depicts the events leading up to and following the disappearance of the station's star tango singer, played by Amanda Ledesma. It may be seen as an exposé of the sensationalism of radio stations of the period. Enrique Santos Discépolo won praise for his performance as the increasingly desperate director of the station.

== Plot ==
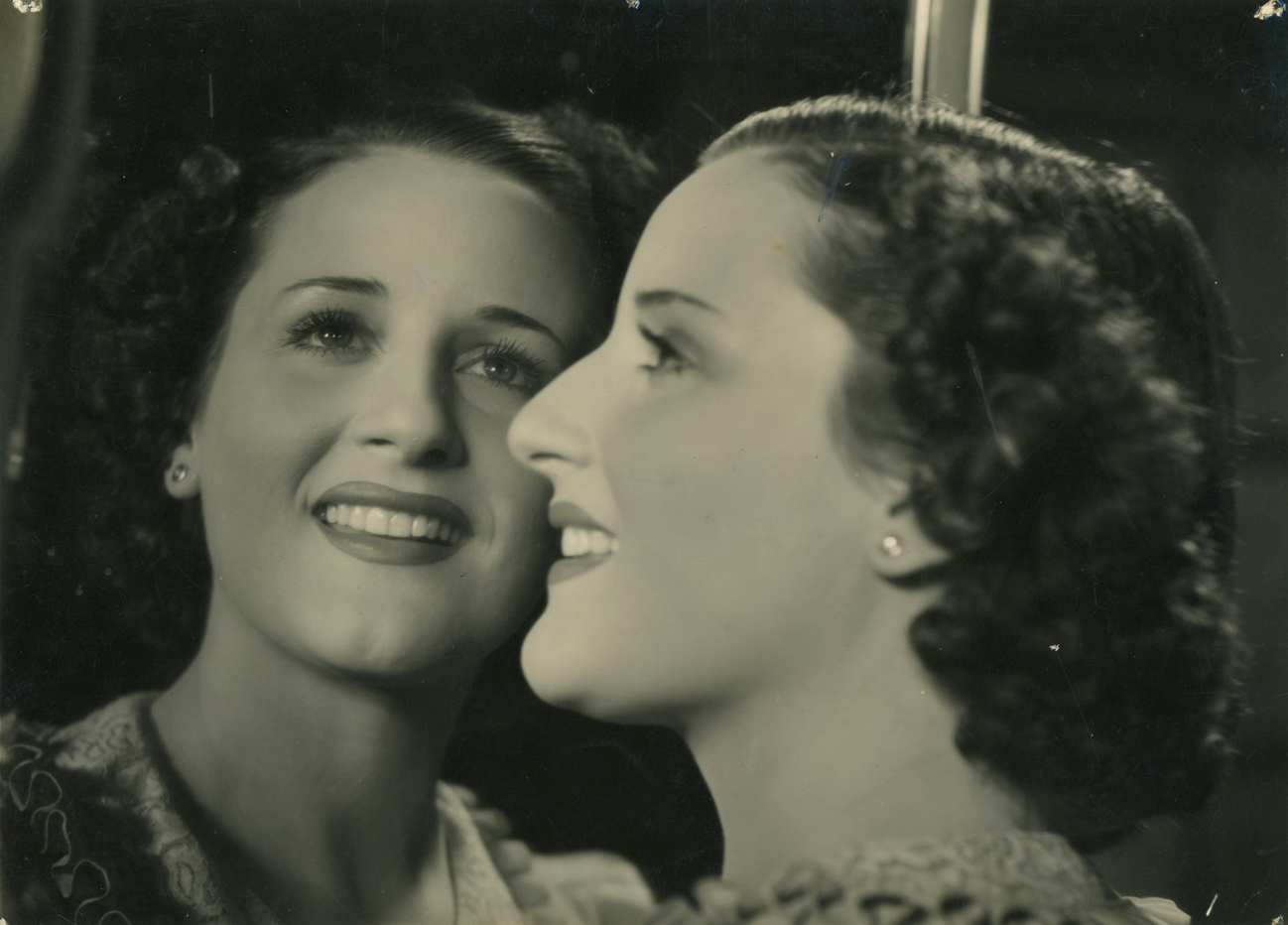
Amanda Ledesma in a film still.

The film is set in the Radio Moderna broadcast station. The station director, Martín Martínez, is interpreted by Enrique Santos Discépolo, who also helped with the script. The director is worried about withdrawal of ads and falling profits, and throughout the film is looking for something exciting for listeners that will make the audience grow again.

The character of the radio tango star, Alicia Reyles, played by Amanda Ledesma, is a modern woman who divorces her husband in Montevideo because she has a relationship with the station's most important sponsor, Aguirre. Reyles is victim of an assassination attempt and kidnapping while singing during a radio broadcast. The story of the radio station emerges as different members of the station are interrogated by the police. At the end of the film it is revealed that Martínez has arranged the disappearance as a strategy to increase the audience.

In parallel, the film tells the story of Juanita (Rosita Contreras), a girl from the interior who comes to Buenos Aires to try her luck with radio, but has little success. One night Argüello, the announcer of Radio Moderna, finds Juanita in the street, decides to help her, and then they fall in love. This couple solve the mystery of the kidnapping of Alicia Reyles at the end of the film, when the station is given a new direction.

The main musical numbers are rehearsals and performances of the two tango stars, Amanda Ledesma and Rosita Contreras. There are also outstanding performances by the Juan d'Arienzo's well-known orchestra and the Santa Paula Serenaders jazz band. The orchestra and band made important contributions to the success of the film, as did the star performers. One number is a comedy where everyone in the cast sings a part of a song in which the main singers are Ledesma and Contreras.

== Cast ==
Actor	Role
Rosita Contreras	Juanita
Enrique Santos Discépolo	Martín Martínez
Amanda Ledesma	Alicia Reyles
Marcos Caplán	Argüello
Ernesto Raquén	Carlos Aguirre
Juan Bono	Comisario Giménez
Pascual Pelliciota	Torres
Guillermo Battaglia	Matías

== Themes ==
The film is a police comedy with songs interpreted by Rosita Contreras and Amanda Ledesma. It gives a comical and satirical presentation of the financial model of radio stations. The film depicts the conflicts between the interests of the audience, advertisers and censors. The character of Enrique L Santos Discépolo, constantly negotiating with advertisers, parodies the relationship, as do the performers who sing the words of the advertisements with the ridiculous rhythms of the S.A.D.R.A. (Sociedad Argentina de Radio Audiciones).

== Production ==
The film was made on a relatively low budget. The 76-minute film was directed by Luis Moglia Barth. Moglia Barth had made the first sound film version of José Mármol's novel Amalia in 1936. He directed other musicals and crime films such as Con el dedo en el gatillo (1940). The script is by René Garzón, Luis Moglia Barth and Enrique Santos Discépolo. Music is by Juan d'Arienzo, Enrique Santos Discépolo and José Vázquez Vigo. Cinematography is by Alberto Etchebehere.

The scenery was created by the artist Raúl Soldi. In 1933 he was awarded a scholarship by the National Cultural Commission to the United States, where he worked in Hollywood as a set designer. After returning to Argentine he designed sets for Alberto de Zavalía's Escala en la ciudad and for Luis Saslavsky's Crimen a las tres. He became one of the most prolific scenographers in the country. The decorations of the homes of the characters and the radio offices is in modern, rationalist style typical of upper-class homes in Buenos Aires at the time, apart from the lodgings of Argüello, who belongs to a lower social class.

== Release ==
The film was released on 17 November 1937.

== Critical response ==
The newspaper La Prensa praised the interpretive capacity of Discépolo in his role as director of the radio station, in which his grotesque performance is full of expression and vigour. Sergio Pujol also refers to Discépolo's "grotesque technique" at the end of the film where his explanation of what he had done could be called an apocalyptic criticism of the radio medium, with the demand of its audience for sensation.

== Sources ==
- Galasso, Norberto; Dimov, Jorge (1 January 2004), Fratelanza: Enrique Santos Discépolo : el reverso de una biografía, Ediciones Colihue SRL, ISBN 978-950-581-944-7
- Mariño, Cecilia Gil (2015), El mercado del deseo: Tango, cine y cultura de masas en la Argentina de los '30, Teseo, ISBN 978-987-723-039-0
- Melodías porteñas (in Spanish), Cinenacional.com
- Pazos, Roberto Blanco; Clemente, Raúl (1 January 2004), De la fuga a la fuga: diccionario de films policiales, Corregidor, ISBN 978-950-05-1528-3
- Rist, Peter H. (8 May 2014), Historical Dictionary of South American Cinema, Rowman & Littlefield Publishers, ISBN 978-0-8108-8036-8
