= Paz Palace =

Building in Buenos Aires, Argentina

Coordinates: 34°35′46″S 58°22′39″W

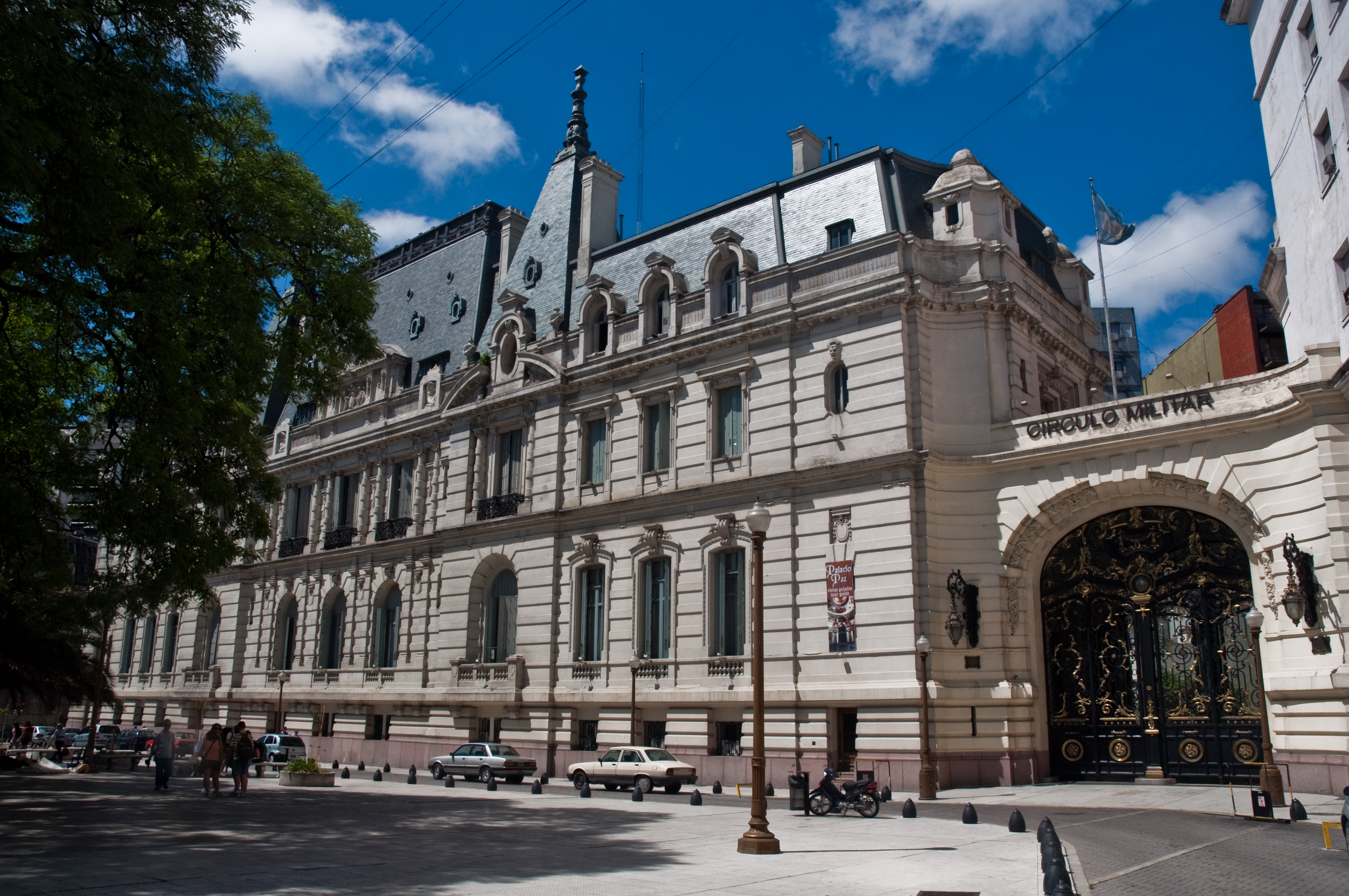
The former Paz Palace, today the Military Officers' Association.

The Paz Palace is a former mansion in Buenos Aires, Argentina, housing the Military Officers' Association, a social club maintained by the Argentine military.

== Overview ==
One of Buenos Aires' most traditional social clubs, the Military Officers' Association was founded in 1881 by Nicolás Levalle, a decorated officer in the Argentine Army who believed such a facility could help mitigate tensions among the officer corps from Argentina's then-fractious provinces. The club relocated to a palace facing San Martín Plaza in 1938. The building was designed by French architect Louis Sortais and built between 1902 and 1914 at the behest of José C. Paz, the proprietor of the city's then-second most-circulated newspaper, La Prensa. Built entirely with material imported for the purpose from France, the palace stands near the eastern end of Santa Fe Avenue, in the Retiro section of Buenos Aires.

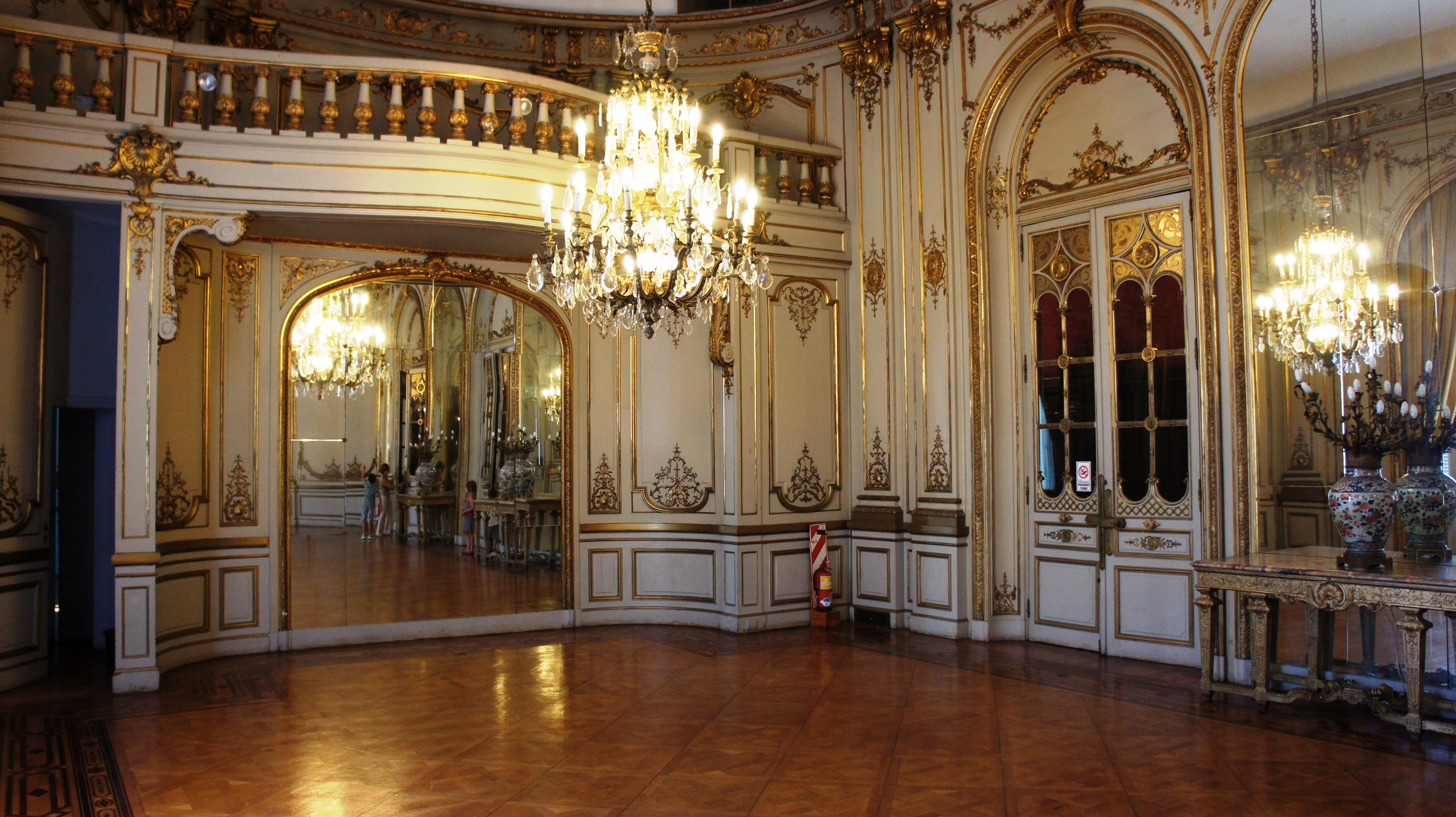
Ballroom

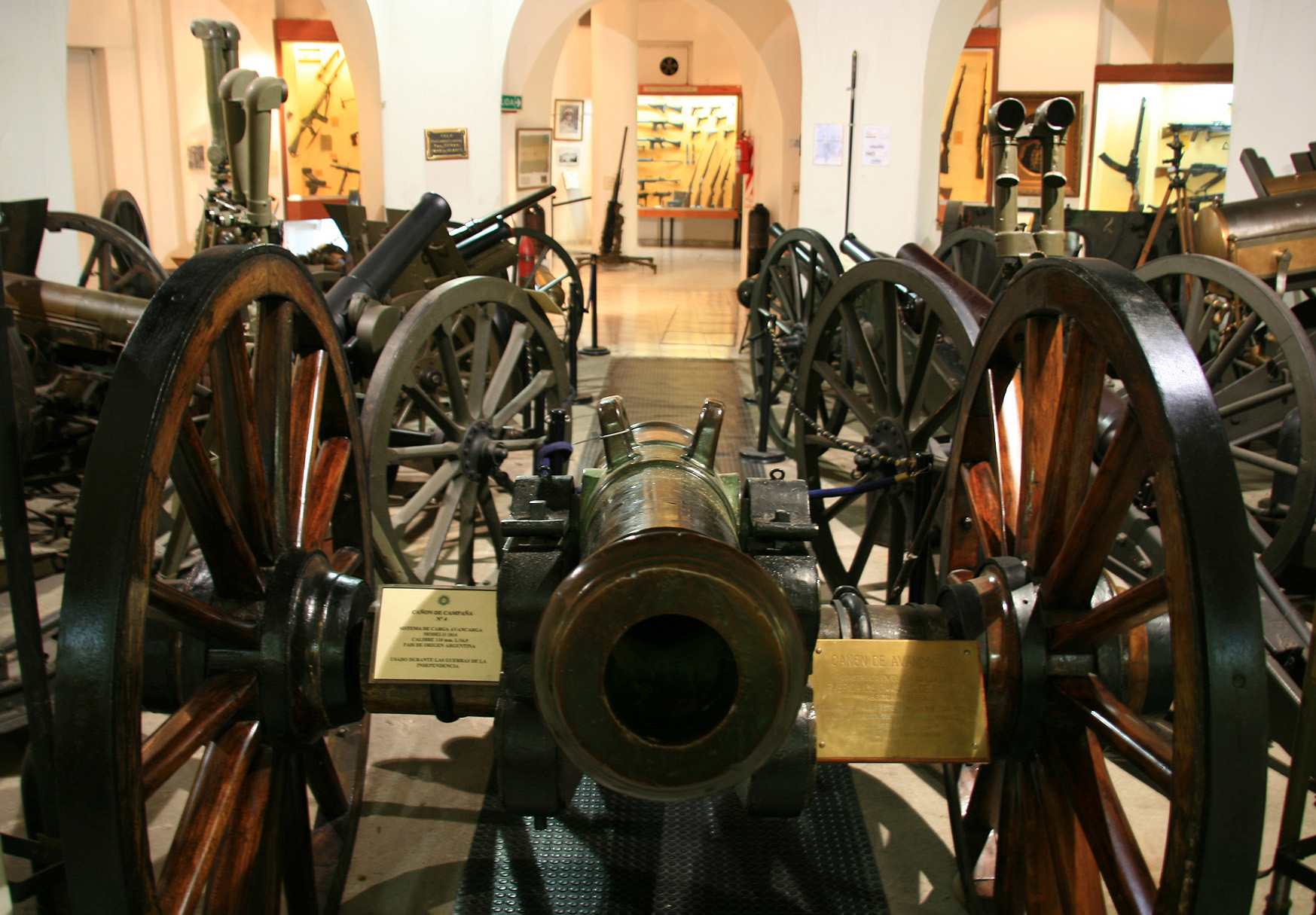
Military museum: Artillery

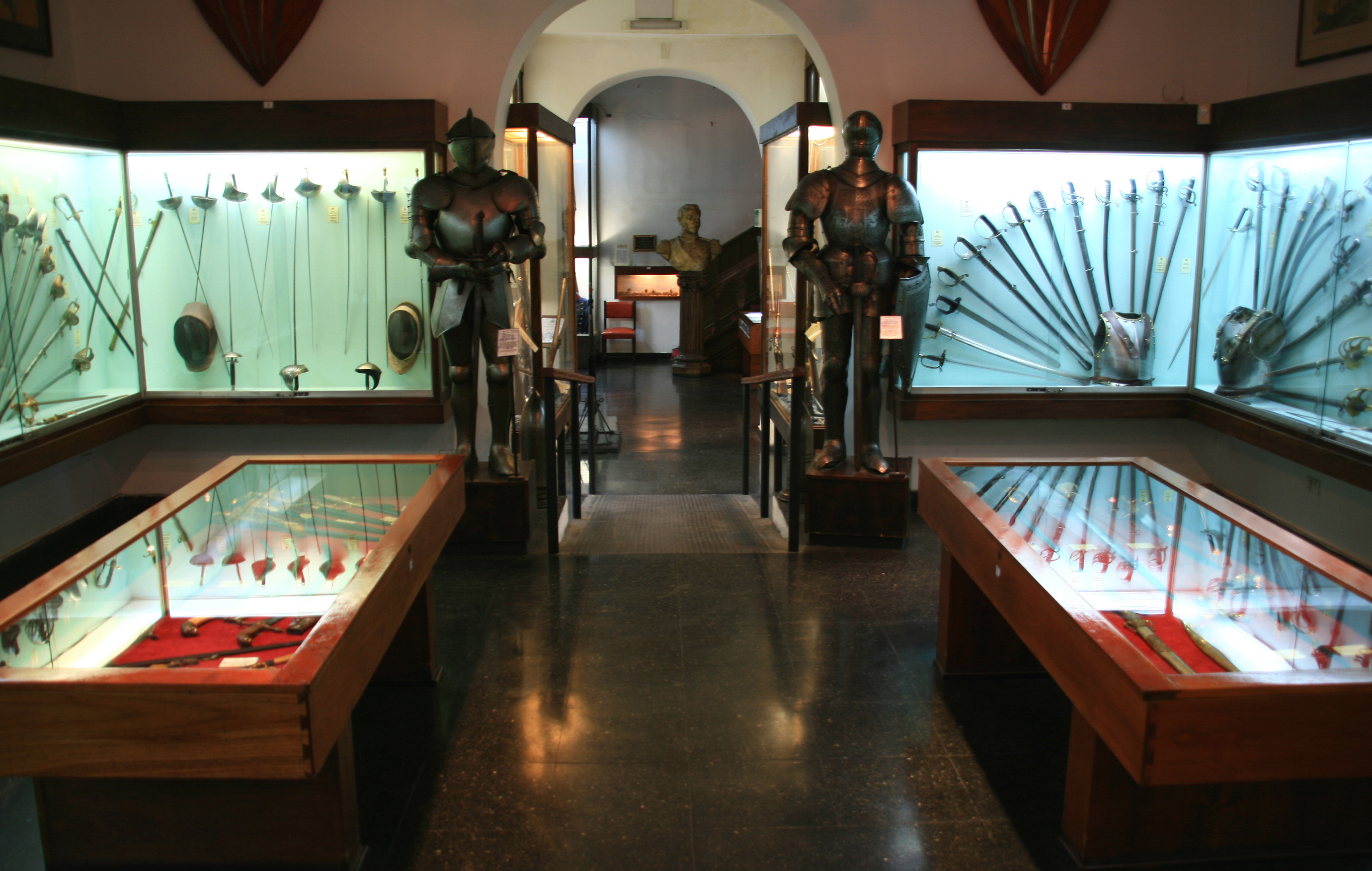
Swords and sabres

The association established a number of cultural entities. The Officers' Cultural Foundation, which administers the palace as a museum and hosts lectures, expositions and concerts, is maintained in conjunction with the Catholic University of Argentina. The palace also houses the Officers' Library, a small publishing house devoted to the translation of military texts from overseas, as well as its own library, a collection of over 120,000 texts which serves as the primary resource for military history research in Argentina.

== Museum of Arms of the Nation ==
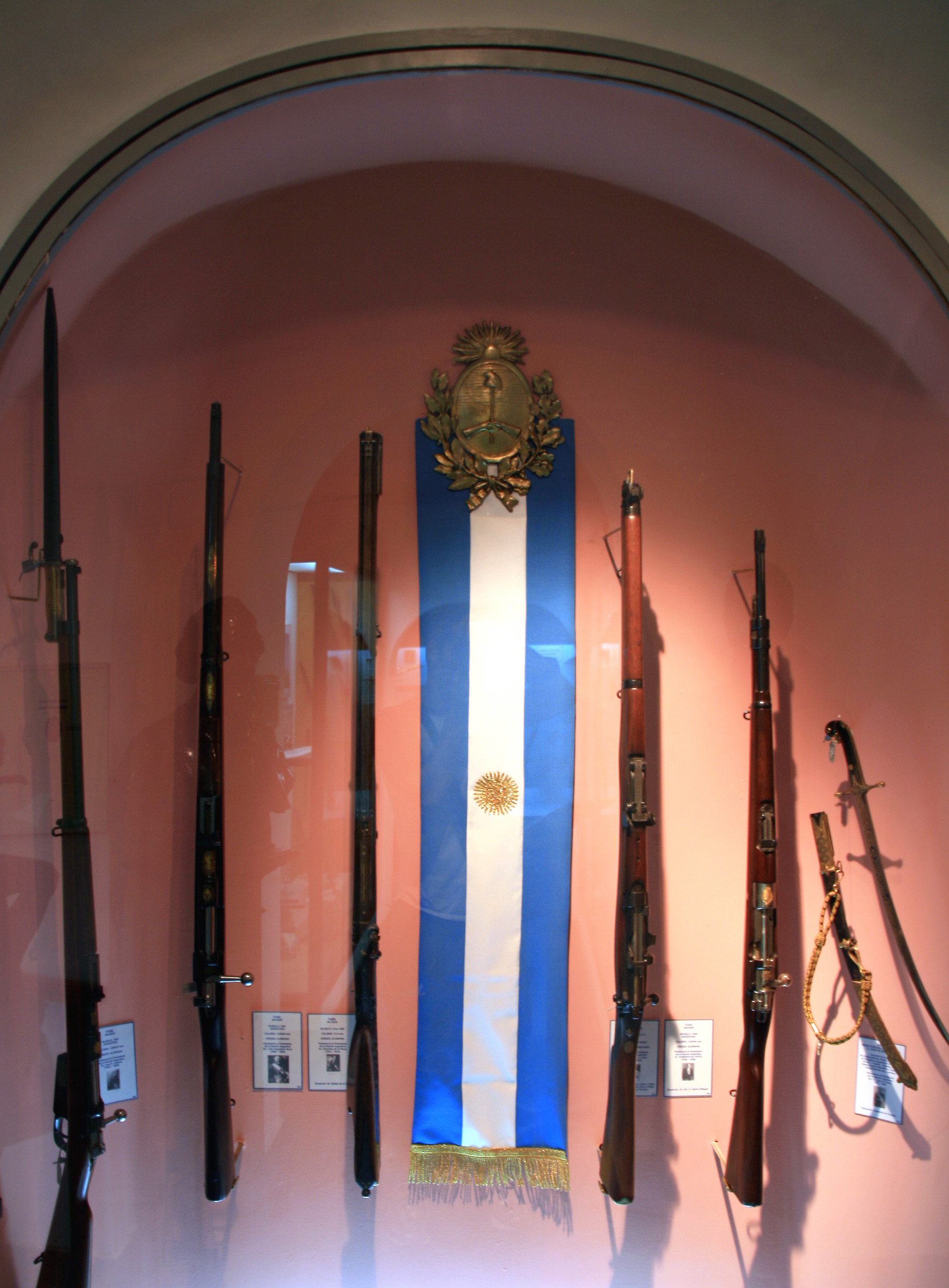
Rifles dating from the Wars for Independence

The National Museum of Armaments (Spanish:Museo de Armas de la Nación) is also housed in the Paz Palace. Argentina's most important military museum, it was inaugurated in 1941 and includes 15 rooms where its collection is divided chronologically and by country of origin. Its oldest pieces include a chain mail armor belonging to the Byzantine Emperor Comnenus (c. 1100), crossbows, maces, two-handed swords, flails and other weapons dating from the Crusades, and an arquebuse used during the Battle of Aguere in Spain. The museum also houses a large collection of banners and weapons dating from the Argentine War of Independence, including a locally modified Mauser rifle prized at the time for its durability, as well as a modern artillery section tracing the development of the early machine gun during the 19th century.

The library is reserved for the association's members and for researchers, though the military museum is open to the public and the Paz Palace itself can be visited through guided tours.

== In popular culture ==
- The Palace featured in the 2015 film Focus.
- Ricky Martin filmed the Music Video of his song Frio, in the Palace in 2011.
- The 2024 Tv Serie Senna has scenes filmed in the hotel.

== External links and references ==
- Círculo Militar (in Spanish)
