= List of Argentine films of 1937 =

A list of films produced in Argentina in 1937:

Argentine films of 1937
Title	Director	Release	Genre
A - F
Así es el tango	Eduardo Morera	24 February	Musical
Barranca abajo	José V. Grubert	26 April	Drama
Besos brujos	José A. Ferreyra	30 June	Musical, Drama
The Boys Didn't Wear Hair Gel Before	Manuel Romero	31 March	Comedy
Cadetes de San Martín	Mario Soffici	3 March	Drama
El cañonero de Giles	Manuel Romero	20 January	Comedy
La casa de Quirós	Luis José Moglia Barth	6 October	Comedy
El escuadrón azul	Nelo Cosimi	24 November	Drama, Thriller
El forastero	Antonio Ber Ciani	3 November	Comedy, Drama
Fuera de la ley	Manuel Romero	14 July	Political drama
La fuga	Luis Saslavsky	28 July	Political
G - N
Los locos del cuarto piso	Lisandro de la Tea	10 November	Comedy
Lo que le pasó a Reynoso	Leopoldo Torres Ríos	18 February	Drama
Mateo	Daniel Tinayre	22 July	Drama
Melgarejo	Luis José Moglia Barth	19 Mayo	Comedy
Melodías porteñas	Luis José Moglia Barth	17 November	Musical
La muchacha del circo	Manuel Romero	5 May	Musical
Muchachos de la ciudad	José A. Ferreyra	13 May	Musical
Murió el sargento Laprida	Tito Davison	23 December	Drama
El Nahuel Huapi y su región	Emilio W. Werner		Documentary
Nobleza gaucha	Sebastián M. Naón	15 September	Drama
O - Z
Palermo	Arturo S. Mom	23 June	Political
Papá Chirola	Edmo Cominetti	28 September	Romantic drama
Paraguay, tierra de promisión	James Bauer		Drama
El pobre Pérez	Luis César Amadori	10 February	Comedy
Una porteña optimista	Daniel Tinayre	25 February	Comedy
La sangre de las guitarras	Vicente G. Retta		
¡Segundos afuera!	Alfredo Etchebehere and Chas de Cruz	4 August	Comedy
Sol de primavera	José A. Ferreyra	22 September	Crime, Musical, Fantasy
Tigre	Emilio W. Werner		Documentary
Viejo barrio	Isidoro Navarro	18 February	Romantic Drama
Viento Norte	Mario Soffici	13 October	Historical
La virgencita de madera	Sebastián M. Naón	21 April	Drama
La vuelta de Rocha	Manuel Romero	8 September	Comedy
