= Buenos Aires House of Culture =

Building in Buenos Aires, Argentina

Coordinates: 34°36′29″S 58°22′28″W

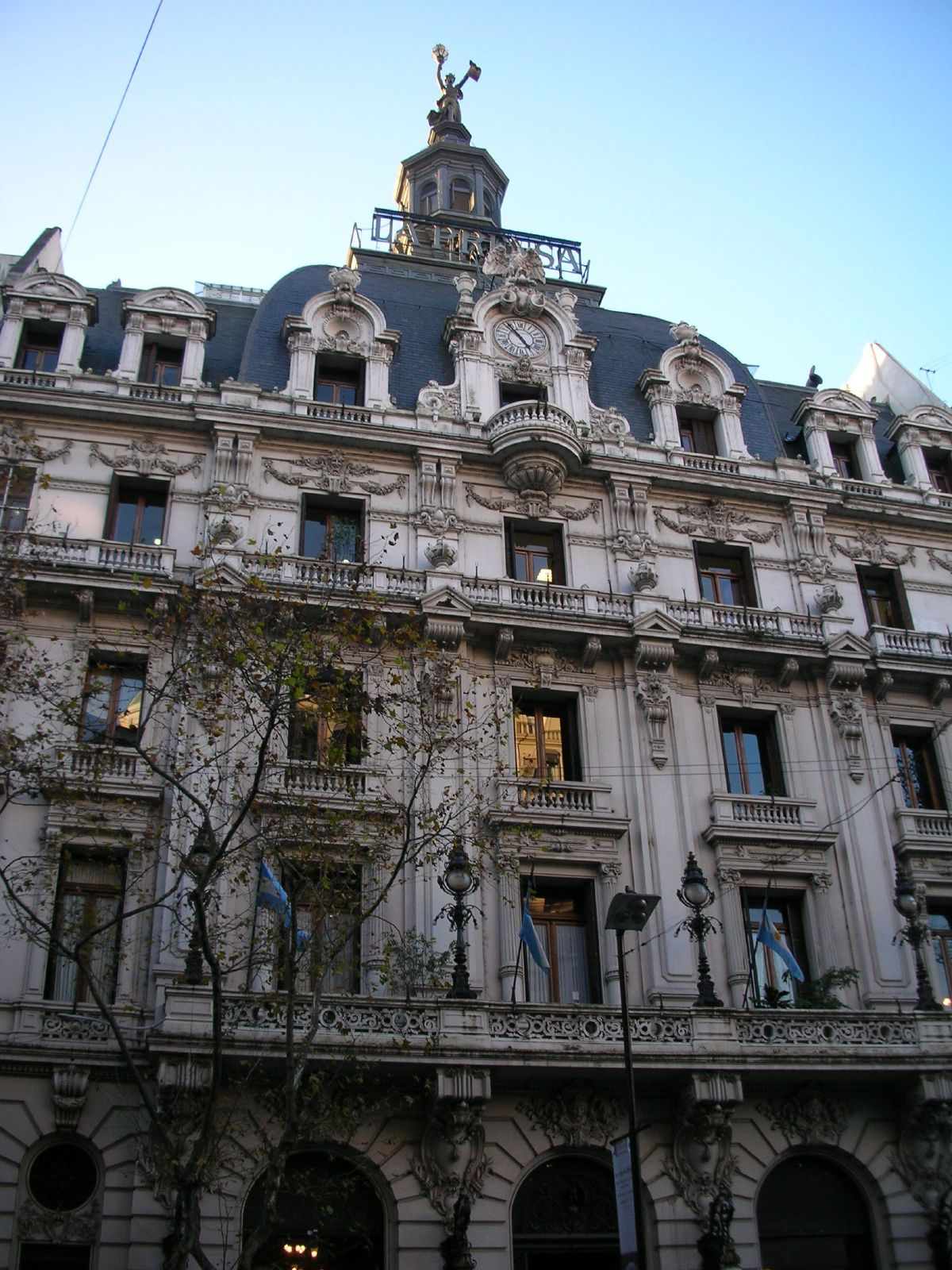
The Buenos Aires House of Culture

The Buenos Aires House of Culture is an architectural landmark in the Montserrat section of the Argentine capital.

== Overview ==
The outmoded headquarters of what was then Argentina's second-largest newspaper, La Prensa, led its influential proprietor in 1894, José Clemente Paz, to purchase a 1300 m^{2} (14,000 ft²) lot on the newly opened Avenida de Mayo, and he commissioned local architects Carlos Agote and Alberto Gainza to design a new headquarters at the site. Agote and Gainza, both graduates of the École Centrale des Arts et Manufactures, drew from their training in Paris to create a Beaux-Arts design, beginning with a façade inspired by French architect Charles Garnier.

Completed in 1898, the new La Prensa offices were inaugurated in a ceremony attended by around 20,000. The Beaux-Arts exterior is notable also for its spire, which is topped by a gilt bronze monument to freedom of the press represented by Pallas Athena and created by French sculptor Maurice Bouval (of Thibaut Frères). Bouval's Athena stands 50 m (164 ft) above the ground and holds an electric lamp representing Prometheus' sacred fire.

The spire also contains a siren, installed in 1900 to symbolically herald news La Prensa considered singular milestones. The siren has been rung five times over the decades: on news of the assassination of Umberto I, the King of Italy, in 1900; on the landing of the Apollo 11 spacecraft on the Moon; on the Argentine National Football Team's first FIFA World Cup, in 1978; on the invasion of the Falkland Islands by the last dictatorship, in 1982; and on the return of democracy with the inaugural of President Raúl Alfonsín, in 1983.

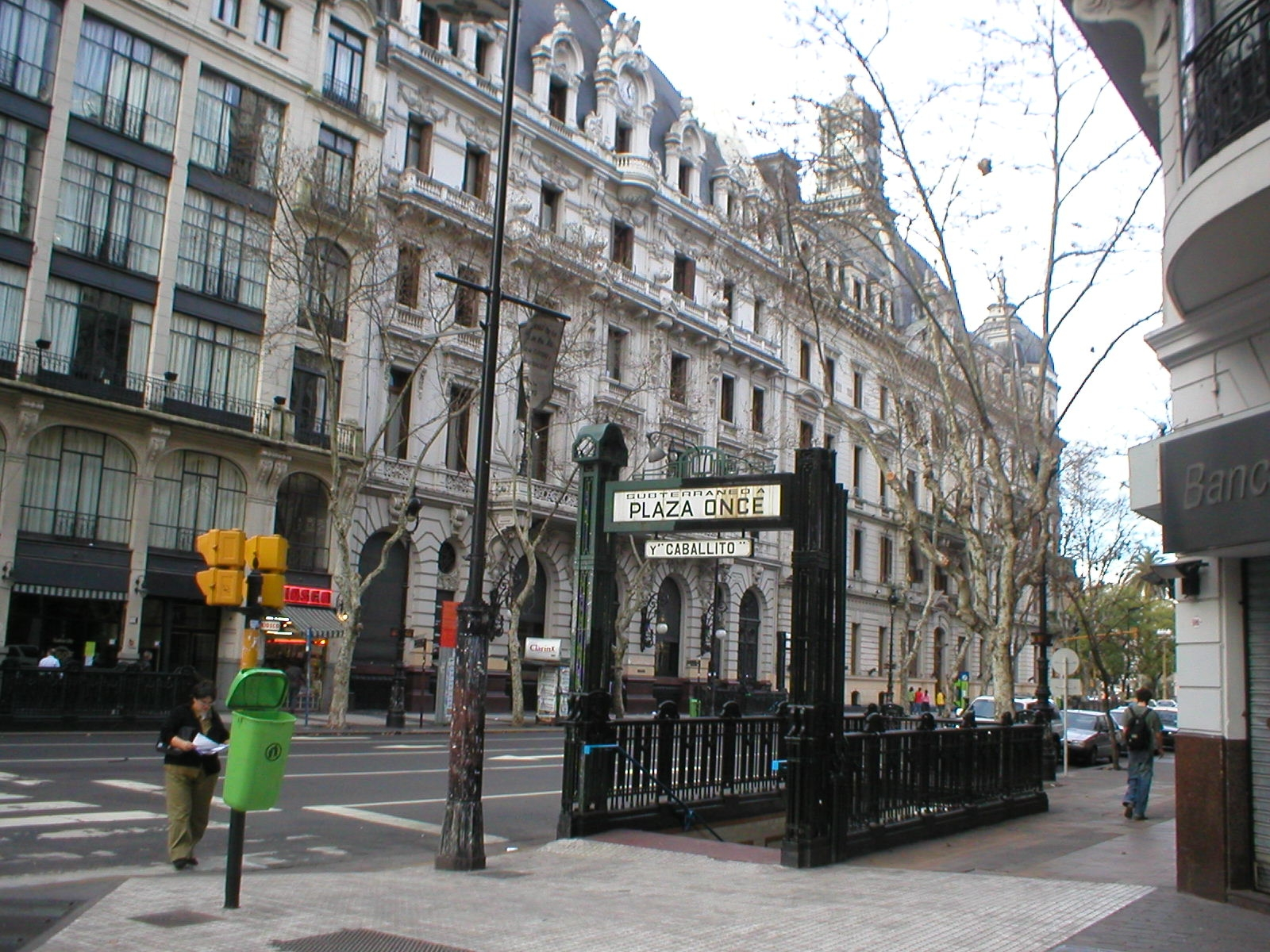
View of the House of Culture and City Hall from the Avenida de Mayo

The building's interior was completed with mostly imported materials, including Spargne elevators from the United States, as well as French fixtures such as Boulanger mosaic tiles, clocks by Paul Garnier and wrought-iron work from Val d'Osne. The first floor is centered on the Golden Salon, where Paz opened the Popular Conference Institute, celebrated during the twentieth century for its weekly literary readings and lectures (notably those of Jorge Luis Borges). The salon was decorated with frescoes by Reinaldo Giudici and Nazareno Orlandi, both Italian-born painters. Paz also opened an extensive library in the building, which grew to over 80,000 volumes and at one time maintained several local branches, as well as one in Paris.

The conservative La Prensa was expropriated by the administration of Juan Perón in 1951, by which the building became property of the CGT labor union. The bronze Minerva was removed by the CGT in 1952, allegedly on fears that it could collapse (that this was a removal of a monument representing freedom of the press has not been lost on historians). The statue was reinstalled in 1956, and while press freedom restrictions otherwise worsened following Perón's overthrow, La Prensa was restored to the Paz family. The newsdaily's decline in readership helped lead to the company sale of the landmark building in 1988, however, and it became the Ministry of Culture of Buenos Aires.

Known since then as the Casa de la Cultura (House of Culture), the building was declared a National Historic Monument in 1995. A passageway built to connect it to the adjacent Buenos Aires City Hall was converted into the Ana Díaz Salon, where art exhibits are hosted.

== Gallery ==
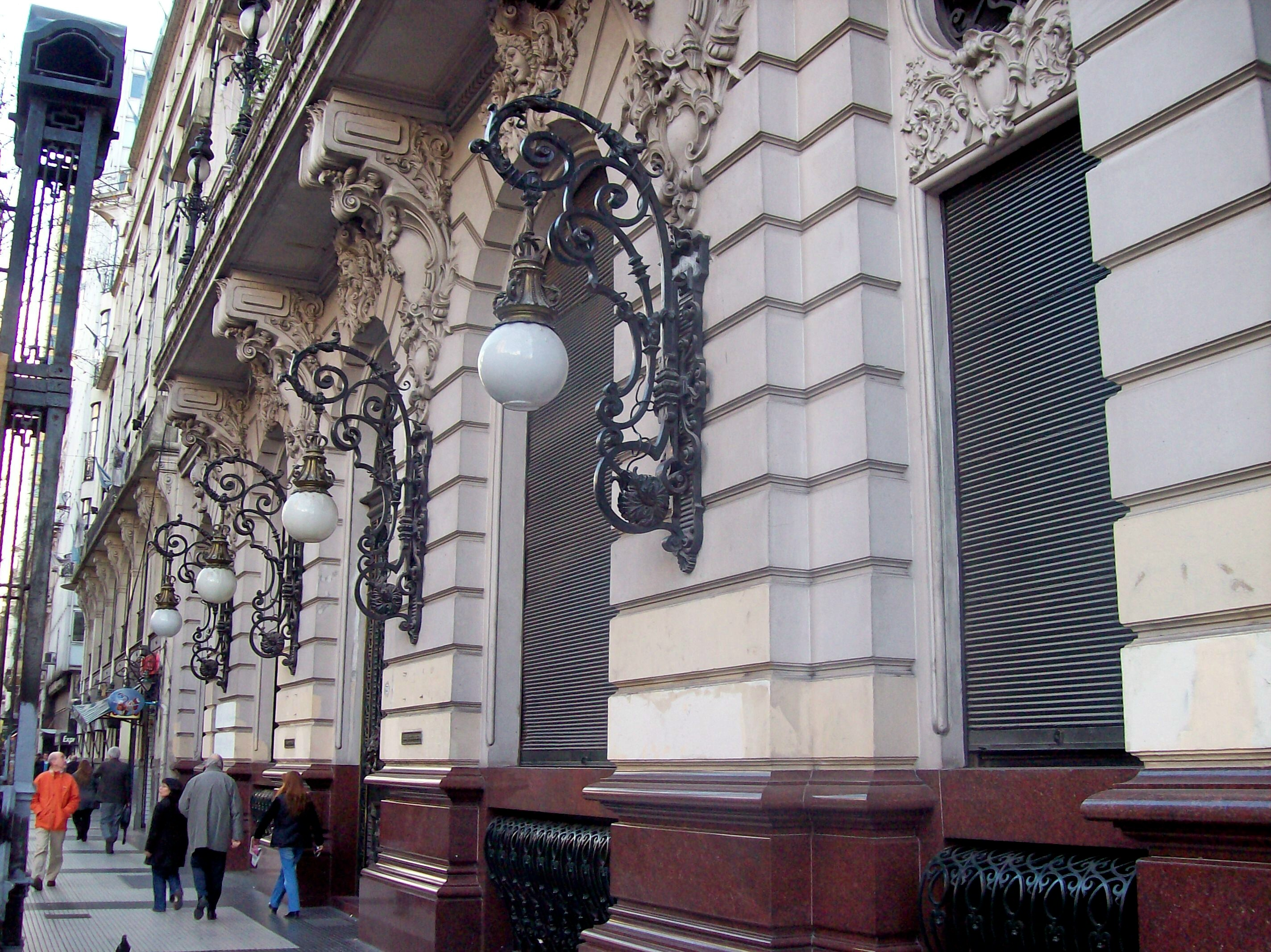

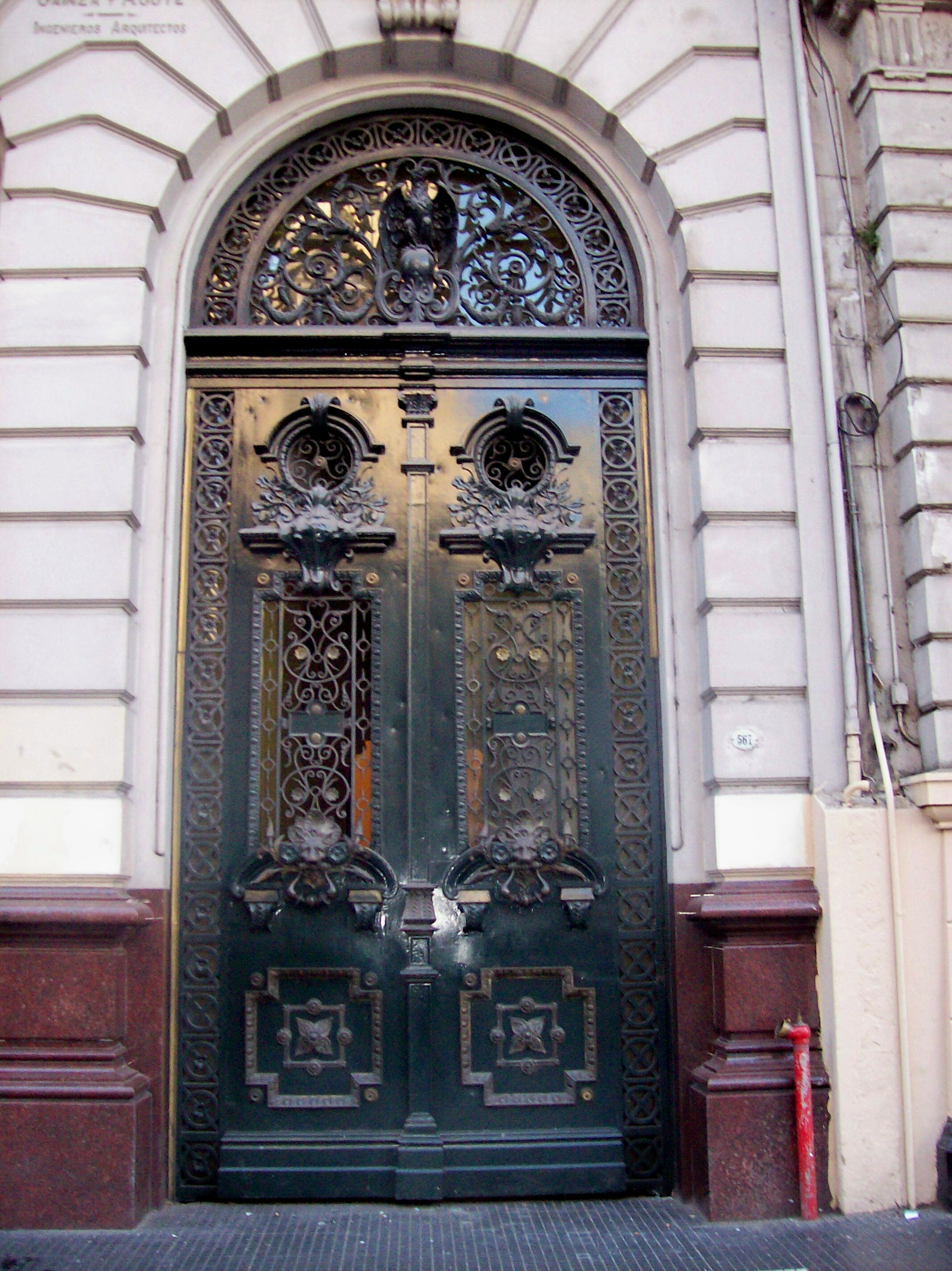

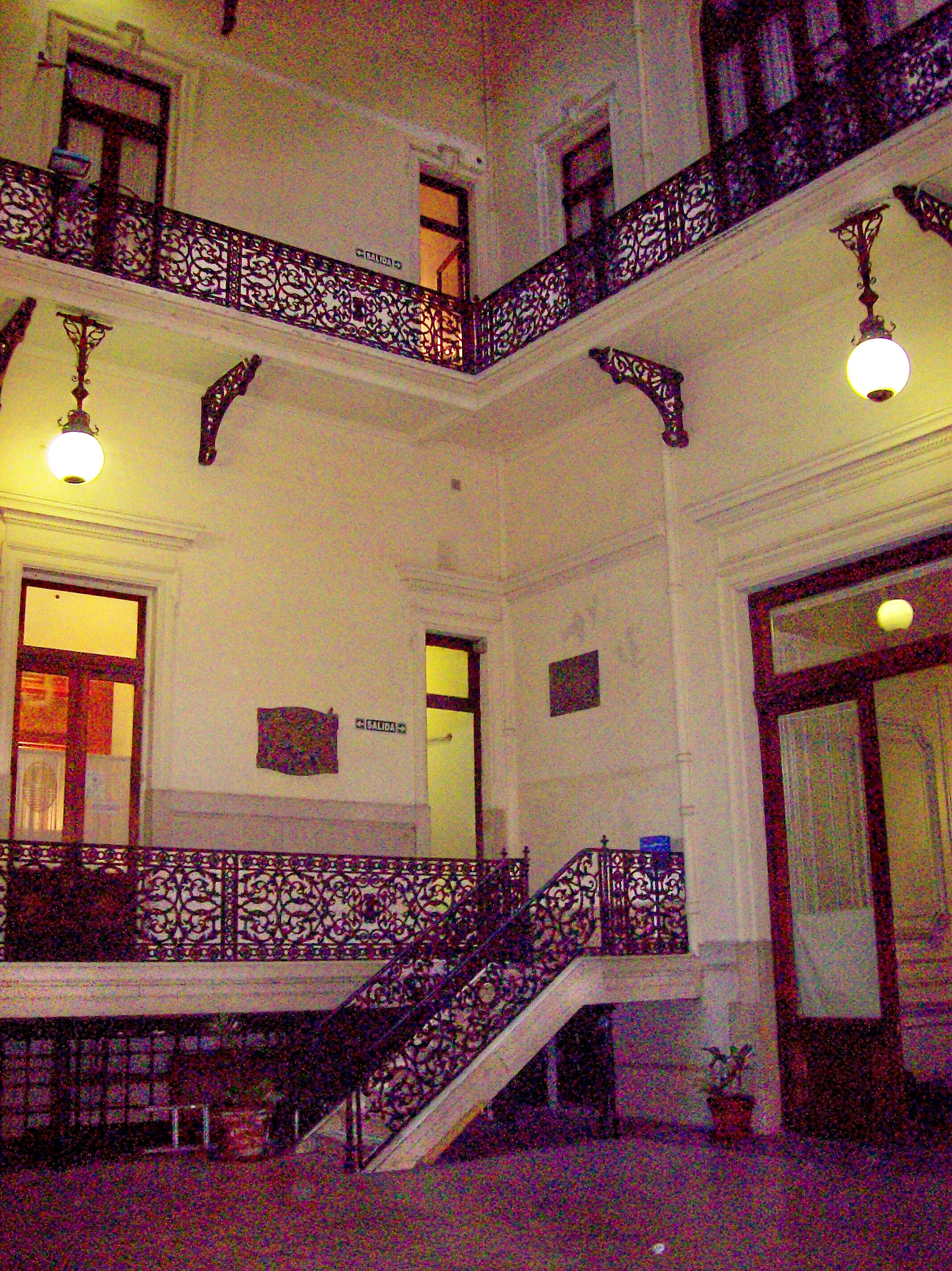

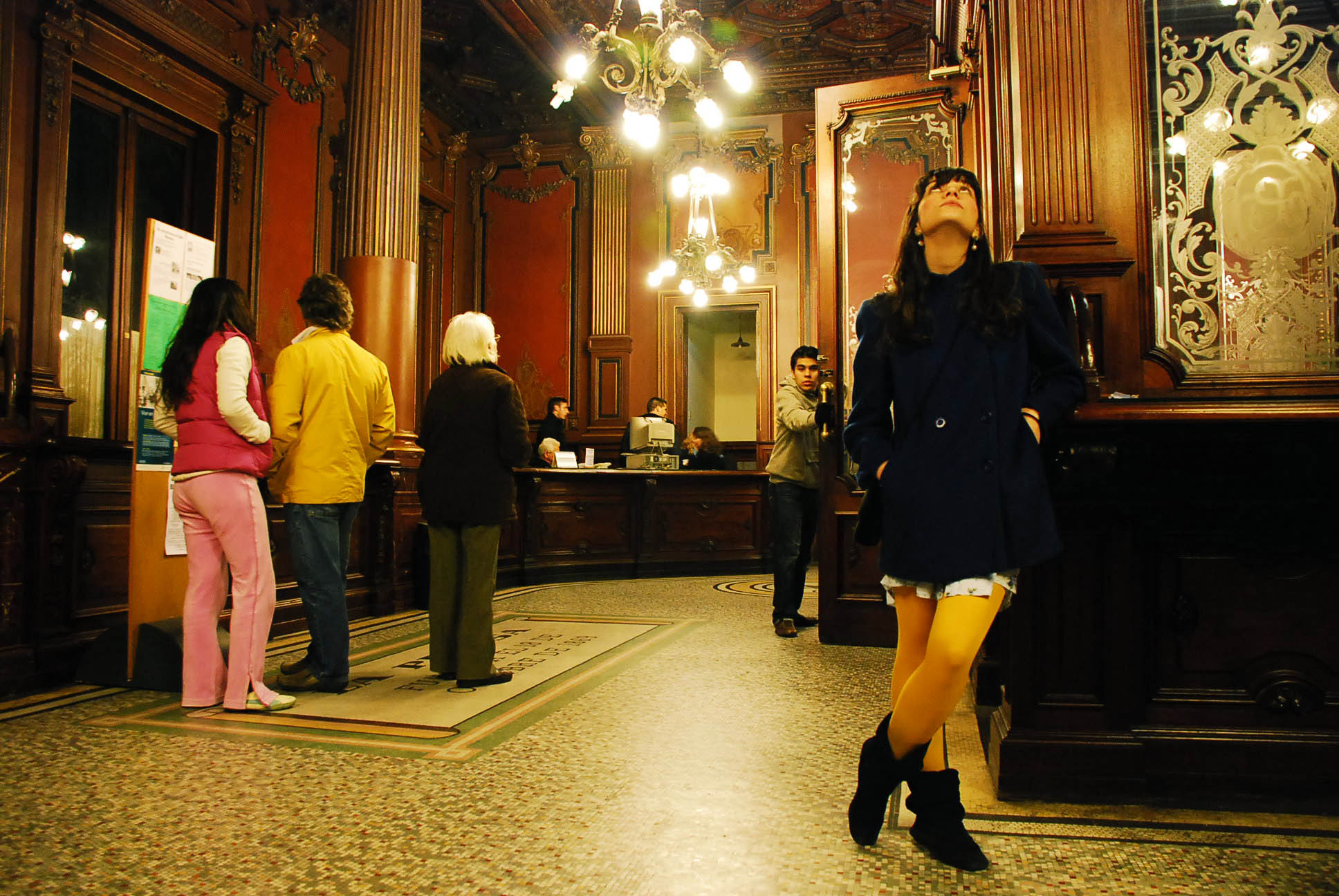

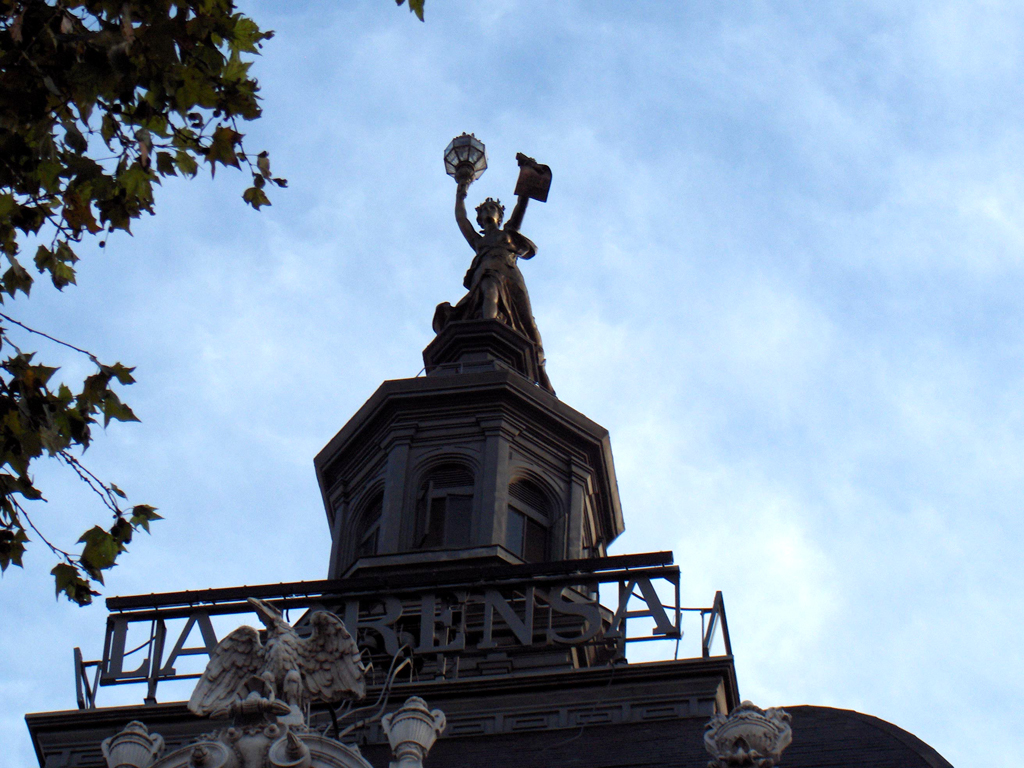

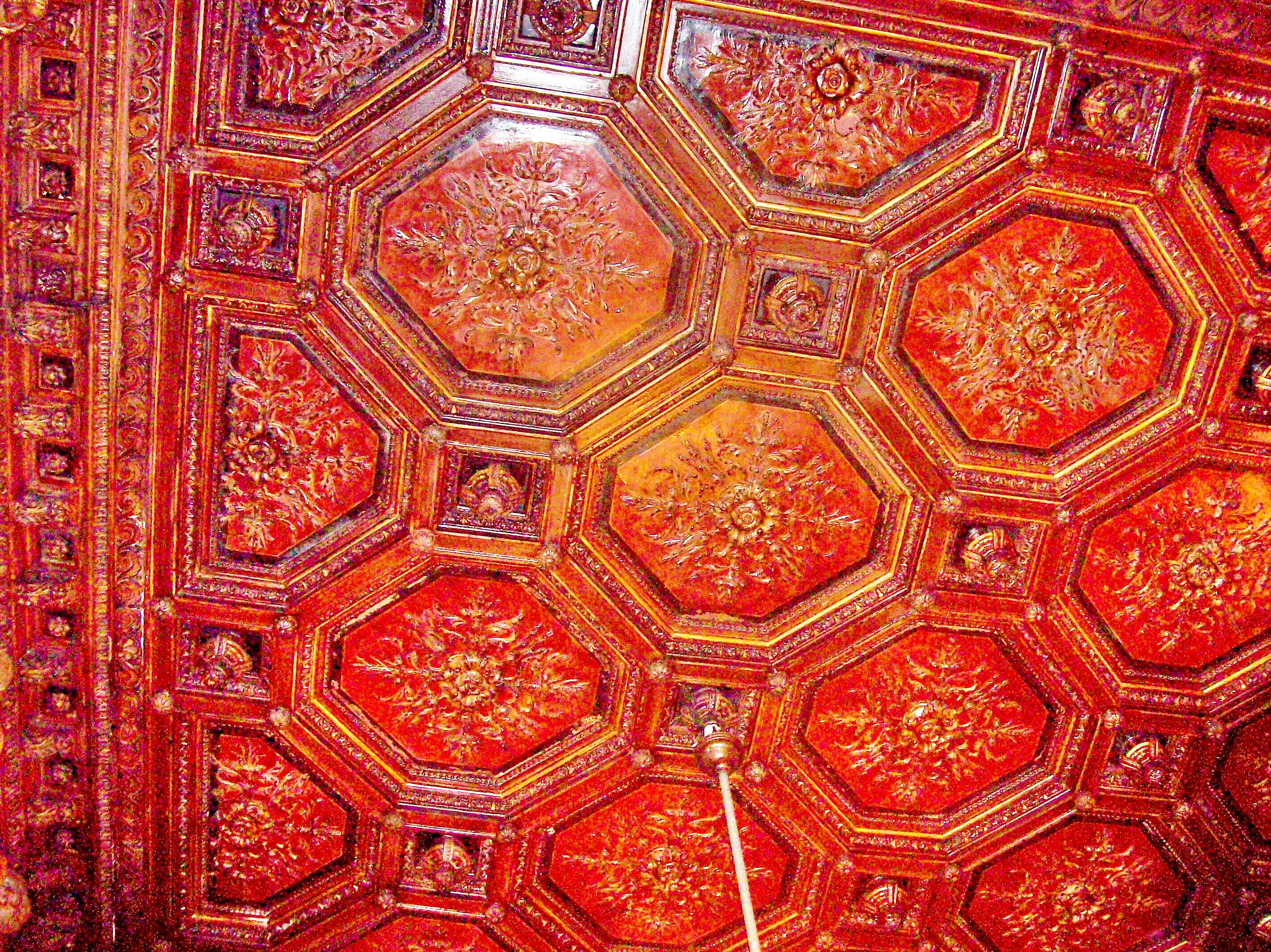

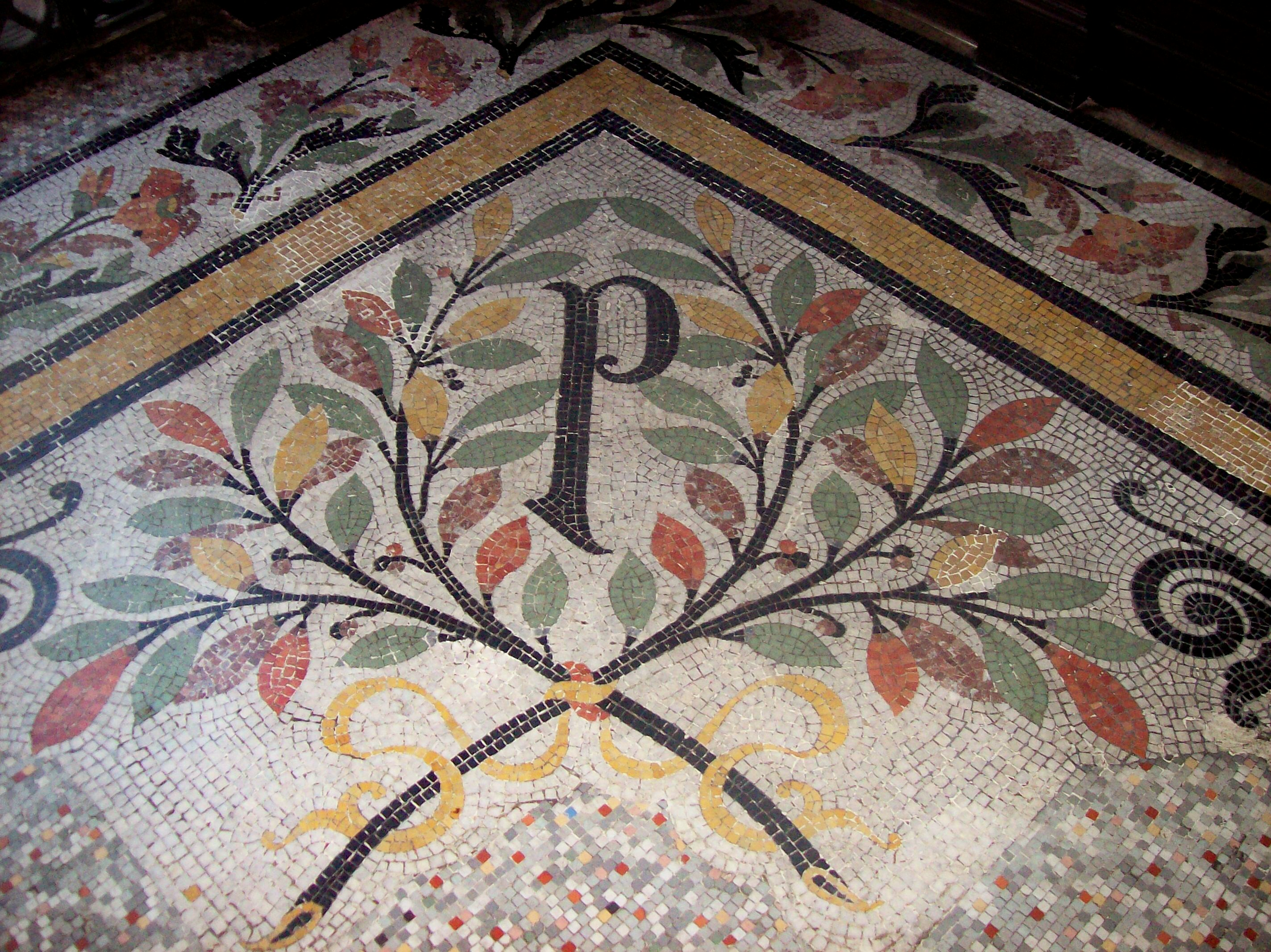
