= Murió el sargento Laprida =

- Directed by: Tito Davison
- Written by: Alberto Vacarezza
- Starring: Mario Danesi; Alberto de Mendoza; Maria Esther Ducks
- Release date: 1937
- Country: Argentina
- Language: Spanish

Murió el sargento Laprida is a 1937 Argentine film directed by Tito Davison during the Golden Age of Argentine cinema.

== Cast ==
- Mario Danesi
- Alberto de Mendoza (as Alberto Mendoza)
- Maria Esther Duckse
- Celia Gámez
