= La Virgencita de madera =

- Directed by: Sebastián Naón
- Release date: 1937
- Country: Argentina
- Language: Spanish

La Virgencita de madera is a 1937 Argentine film directed by Sebastián Naón during the Golden Age of Argentine cinema.

== Cast ==
- Alberto Bello
- Chola Bosch
- Carlos Castro (Castrito)
- Inés Edmonson
