= Maurice Bouval =

French sculptor

Maurice Bouval (1863–1916) was a French sculptor of the Art Nouveau period.

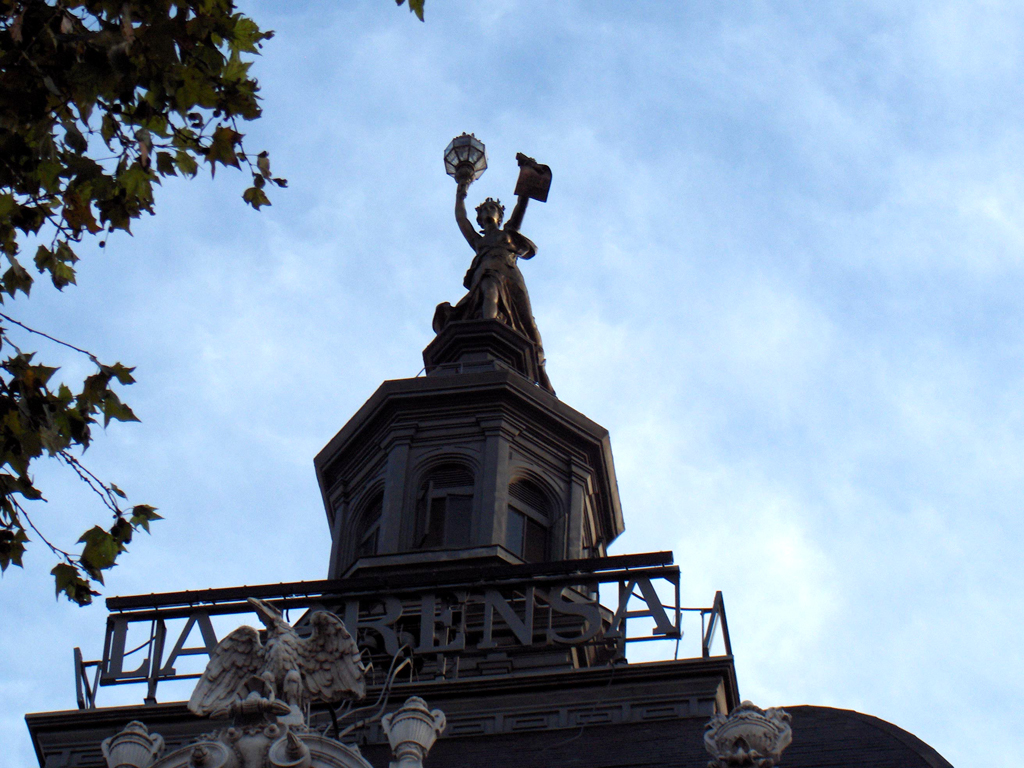
The statue that crowns the tower of the Casa de la Cultura, (Buenos Aires), made by Maurice Bouval.

From 1880 to the first World War, he created a large number of bronze statues or objects including chandeliers, candelabras or table lamps. His main works are Ophelia, Femme assise, Jeune femme, Le Sommeil, Femme aux pavots, Le Secret et la Pensive. He was not a prolific sculptor. He participated in the 1890 Exposition Universelle in Paris and was a member of the Société des Artistes Français.

He was a pupil of Alexandre Falguière.

His works are usually signed M. Bouval.
