= Rosita Contreras =

Argentine actress, singer and vedette

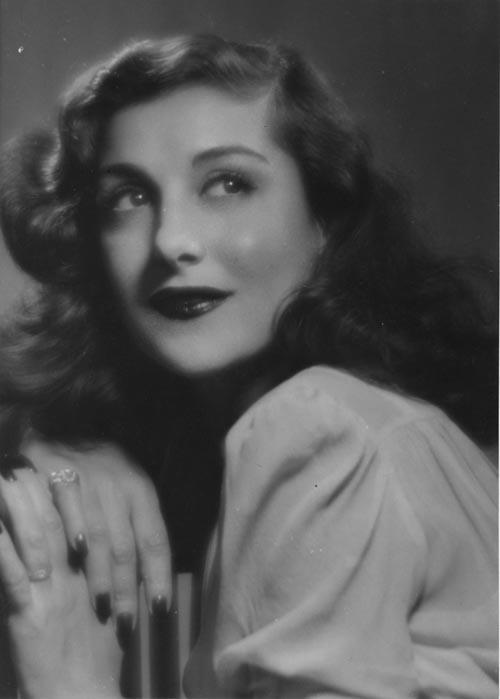
- Born: Rosa Palumbo; March 15, 1913
- Died: 1962 (aged 48–49)
- Occupations: Singer; Actress; Vedette
- Known for: Founded the Comedy Society of Rosita Contreras

Rosa Palumbo (stage name, Rosita Contreras; March 15, 1913 – 1962), was an Argentine actress, singer and vedette. She had a career in theater and also made five films. In 1944, she formed the "Comedy Society of Rosita Contreras" and debuted as a comedic actress comedy in Una divorciada peligrosa, directed by Enrique Guastavino, followed by La novia perdida in the same year. Other works included Retazo and Al marido hay que seguirlo. In 1950, she became a member of the initial executive committee of the Ateneo Cultural Eva Perón.

== Filmography ==
- La canción que tú cantabas (1939)
- Noches de Carnaval (1938)
- Melodías porteñas (1937) ...Juanita
- Viento Norte (1937)
- Cadetes de San Martín (1937)
