= Padden =

Padden is a surname, and may refer to:

- Bert Padden (c. 1932–2010), Scottish football referee
- Billy Joe Padden, Gaelic footballer, son of Willie Joe Padden
- Carol Padden (born 1955), American professor
- Daniel Padden, English musician, member of Volcano the Bear
- Dave Padden (born 1976), Canadian musician
- Dick Padden (1870–1922), American professional baseball player
- Mike Padden (born 1946), American district court judge
- Sarah Padden (1881–1967), American theatre and film actress
- Tessa Padden, British television presenter
- Tom Padden (1908–1973), American baseball player
- Willie Joe Padden (born 1959), Gaelic footballer

== See also ==
- Lake Padden, lake in the United States
