= Cadets of St. Martin =

Cadetes de San Martín
- Directed by: Mario Soffici
- Written by: José A. Saldías
- Produced by: Angel Mentasti
- Starring: Enrique Muiño
- Cinematography: John Alton; Antonio Merayo
- Edited by: Juan Soffici
- Music by: Hans Diernhammer
- Distributed by: Argentina Sono Film S.A.C.I
- Release date: 1937
- Country: Argentina
- Language: Spanish

Cadetes de San Martín is a 1937 Argentine film directed by Mario Soffici and written by José A. Saldías during the Golden Age of Argentine cinema. It stars Enrique Muiño and Elías Alippi.

== Cast ==
- Ángel Magaña
- Enrique Muiño
- Elías Alippi
- Rosa Contreras
- Héctor Calcaño
- Orestes Caviglia
- Héctor Coire
- Rosita Contreras
- Blanca del Prado
- Matilde Rivera
- Oscar Villa
