= Padin =

Padin may refer to:

- Pablo Padin, Argentinian musician, member of God Save the Queen (band)
- Padín, Spanish surname
- Roberto Garrido Padin (born 1945), Brazilian catholic bishop
