= Antonia Pérez Padín =

Spanish feminist and communist

- Born: Ceuta
- Citizenship: Spain
- Occupations: Grocer; Activist; Midwife
- Era: Spanish Civil War
- Known for: Feminist and communist activist
- Political party: Communist Party of Spain
- Movement: Spanish republicanism
- Spouse: Antonio Berrocal Gómez
- Mother: Jacinta

Antonia Pérez Padín (born Ceuta, Spain) was a Spanish feminist and communist active during the Second Republic and the Spanish Civil War in Ceuta. A member of the International Red Aid's Ceuta branch and Partido Comunista de España, she supported striking port workers and fish factory workers by hosting meetings in her home and providing food to striking workers.

Pérez was imprisoned on 14 August 1936 around the time of the coup d'état of 1936. One of five Ceuta women to be sentenced to death by Francoist forces, her sentence was later changed to twelve years in prison of which she served eight, before being released from prison in Madrid. Pérez was one of the few prisoners to share stories of sexual violence in Ceuta's Francoist prison. She also witnessed the death of Antonia Céspedes Gallego. The Unión General de Trabajadores unanimously gave its "La Latera" award posthumously to her in 2017 in recognition of her fight for equality for women. Pérez was married to Antonio Berrocal, having six children with him. Berrocal, a communist city councilor in Ceuta, was killed by a mob of falangists in 1937. Pérez worked as a restaurateur, grocer and midwife.

== Activism and death by Francoism ==
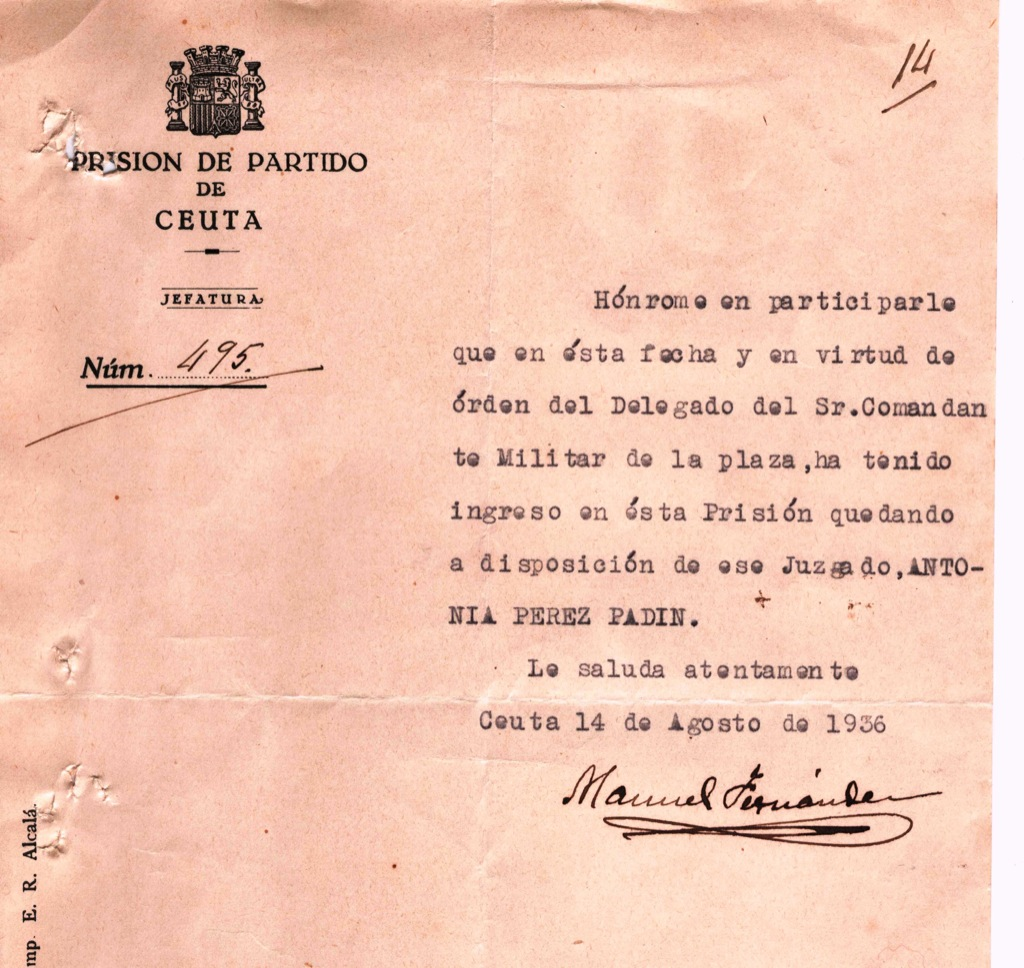
Prison de Partido de Ceuta confirms Antonia Pérez Padín is at the prison under the order of the Delegado del. Senor Comandante Militar on 14 August 1936.

Her father was a teacher. Ideologically, her father was an anarchist. He shared these ideas with Pérez when she was young, instilling her with the value of fighting social injustices.

Pérez was politically engaged as an adult. She was keen to address social injustices. Because of her desire to help the poor and repressed people, she joined International Red Aid's Ceuta branch and was also a member of Partido Comunista de España. As an activist, Pérez supported striking port workers in Ceuta, providing strikers with food. She also hosted meetings of striking port workers in her home. She was also involved in other campaigns for needy in the city. One involved workers at a fish factory in the city. She also fought to support women's rights and equal pay. During the Spanish Civil War, she spent some time in Rabat where she witnessed atrocities committed by Falange Pelegrina. This included shelling of civilians.

Pérez was imprisoned on 14 August 1936 at the Sarchal Women's Prison. The arrest came around the time of the coup d'état of 1936. She never saw her husband again following her arrest. At the time of her arrest in 1936, her children ranged in age from two to ten years of age. Some went to stay with family, thought two went to an asylum. Perez was imprisoned with many other feminist women who supported the Spanish Second Republic. She was then transferred to the García Aldave prison around July 1937.

After several months in prison, Pérez was finally sentenced to death at the age of 39 in Ceuta on 17 November 1937. She received two death sentences. The first was for belonging to International Red Aid's Ceuta branch. The second was for belonging to the Communist Party. Her death sentence was in part because supporting these two organizations was seen as part of a wider imminent plot by communities to create a foreign, Soviet influenced revolution in Spain. She was sentenced along with two other women, Andrea Maese Vázquez and Francisca Gutiérrez Hernández, for the same reasons. Joaquina Garriga Mosquecho and Ana Sánchez González were two of the other five total women in Ceuta to receive death sentences that year. They were the only five women in Ceuta to be given death sentences by Nationalist forces in the period between 1936 and 1942. The death sentences were handed down without the benefit of a trial. Her death sentence was later commuted to 12 years in prison. She would spend the next eight years with time spread out between several prisons, including Sarchal Women's Prison in Ceuta, in Cádiz, in Burgos, and in Madrid. She was in the Madrid prison in 1945. In November 1945, a judge announced her release from the Madrid jail. Pérez was never pardoned by the Spanish State. Es:Penal de El Puerto de Santa María Es:Penal de El Dueso Es:Cárcel de mujeres de Ventas Pérez is one of the few women to have verified stories of sexual violence at Cárcel de Mujeres del Sarchal through her oral history. While in prison, she witnessed a well-known local Falangist seeking sexual favors from another female prisoner, Antonia Céspedes Gallego. On 21 January 21, 1937, the Falangist appeared and took Céspedes from her cell, telling other prisoners "You are reds and one day I will come for some of you." While removing Céspedes from prison, the Falangist stabbed her in the back. A short time later, Pérez heard a gunshot outside the person. As Céspedes was being stabbed, she turned and screamed out to Pérez for help.

When later talking about her time in prison with her children and grandchildren, Pérez described them as hotels. She later shared these experiences with her granddaughter. She made her time in prison sound like she was a world traveler.

The Unión General de Trabajadores unanimously gave its "La Latera" award posthumously to her in 2017, with her son Manuel Berrocal collecting it on her behalf. The decision to award her the prize was based on a commitment to not forgetting historical memory. The award itself is given every two years specifically to remember women who fought for social justice, women's rights and equality in Spain, so they would not be forgotten.

== Background ==
Pérez was born in Ceuta. Her mother was named Jacinta. Pérez inherited her strong character from her.

Pérez was married to Antonio Berrocal. She had six children with him, only five of them survived. Her first child was a girl. Her husband was a member of the Communist Party of Spain, and was elected as a Ceuta city councilor in the elections of 12 April 1931. Berrocal was shot on his own farm along with 32 other people on 21 January 1937 after having been dragged there by a mob of falangists. He was one of eight councilors from the eleven member government who would be shot by Nationalist forces. Her children survived the Civil War, and Pérez eventually had a granddaughter named Gloria Berrocal. Berrocal has written several books about her grandmother's experiences during the Civil War. One of her sons was Manuel Berrocal, a historian. Because of the time his mother spent in prison, Manuel did not get to know her until he was a 10-year-old.

Pérez lived in the Las Latas neighborhood of Ceuta. She ran a small restaurant near in the La Puntilla area in Ceuta. She later ran a small grocery store in Ceuta. She also worked as a midwife.

In her later years, Pérez always dressed in black. Her legs were frequently swollen and she had varicose veins. In life after prison with her family, she listened to Radio Nacional de España, and would frequently sigh when listening to the news portion. In her later years, when she watched television and heard commentators say there were no political prisoners in Spain, she would throw a shoe at the television.
