= Nobleza gaucha (1915 film) =

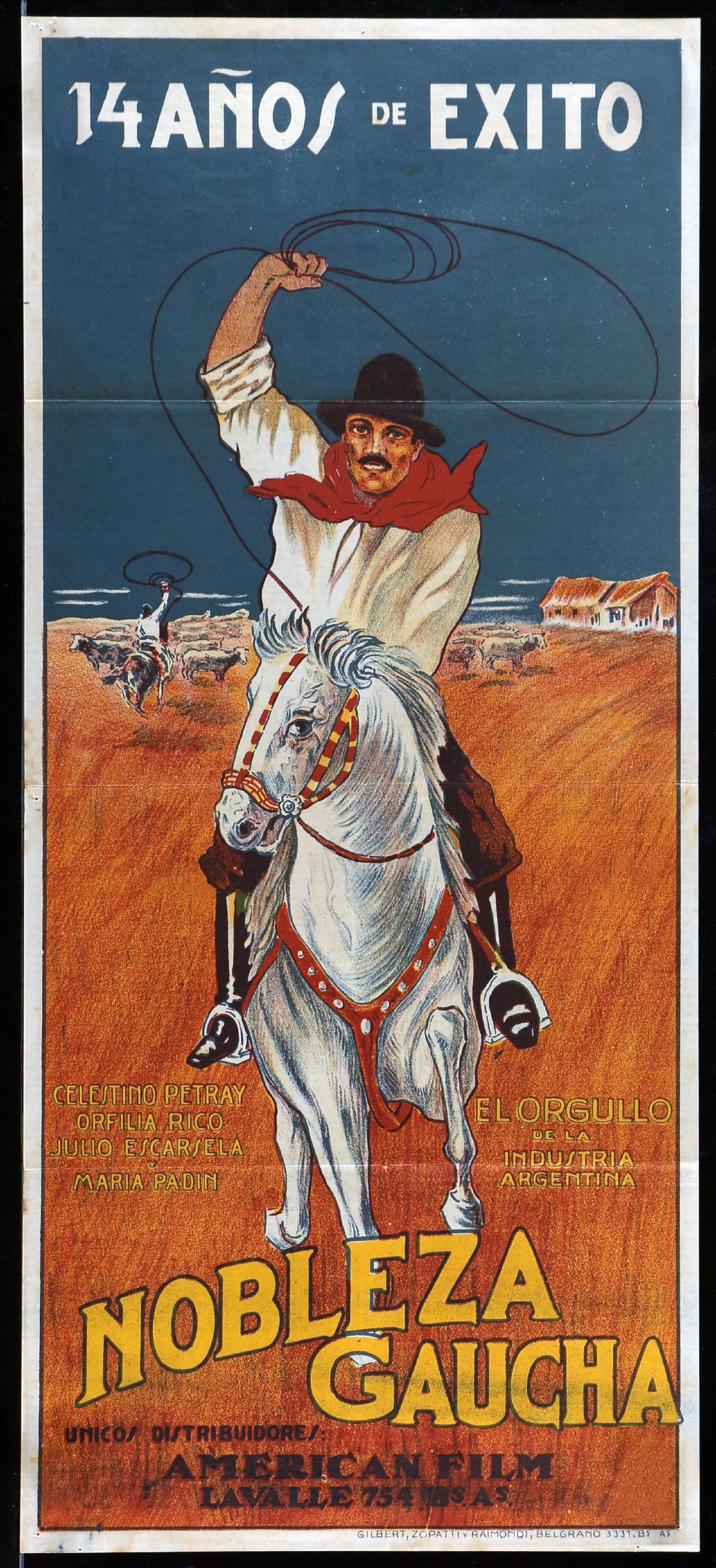
- Directed by: Eduardo Martinez de la Pera; Humberto Cairo; Ernesto Gunche
- Written by: José González Castillo; José Hernández; Rafael Obligado
- Produced by: Humberto Cairo
- Starring: Arturo Mario; María Padín; Celestino Petray
- Cinematography: Eduardo Martinez de la Pera; Ernesto Gunche
- Music by: Francisco Canaro
- Release date: 1915
- Running time: 60 minutes
- Country: Argentina
- Language: Spanish
- Budget: $20,000

Nobleza Gaucha

Nobleza gaucha (Gaucho Nobility) is a 1915 Argentine silent film, loosely based on the Martín Fierro by José Hernández and Santos Vega by Rafael Obligado. It was directed by Eduardo Martinez de la Pera, who shared credit with Humberto Cairo, the producer, and Ernesto Gunche, the cinematographer.

== Synopsis ==
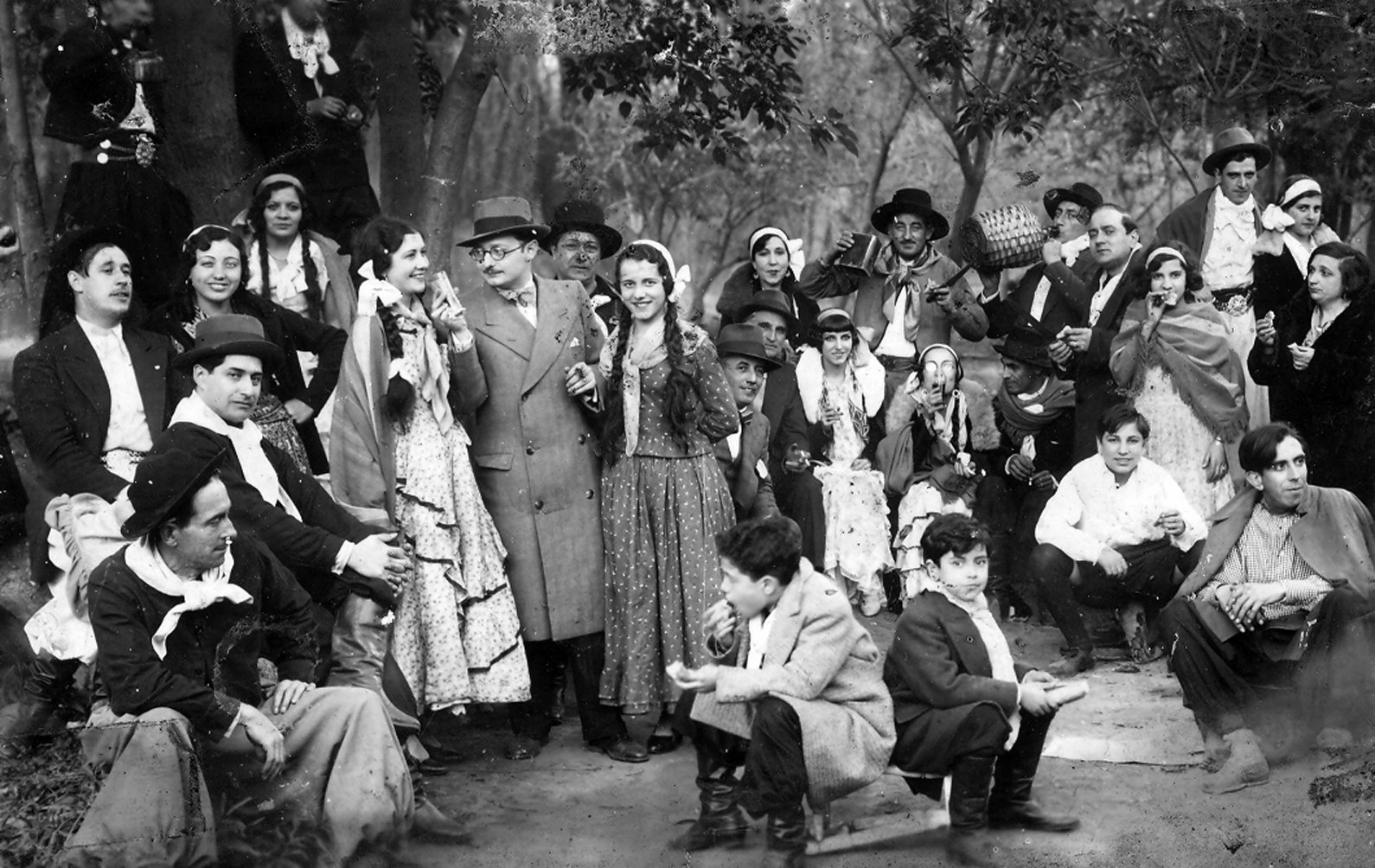
View of the film's cast.

Don José Gran, a rich businessman from Buenos Aires, travels to La Pampa to search for horses. He hires Juan, a noble gaucho who tames horses for a living, to aid him in his search. On that very day, Juan rescues a damsel in distress, María, from a crazed horse. Don José Gran then kidnaps María and goes back to Buenos Aires with her. Juan decides to go uptown and rescue her; a fellow ranch hand, Don Genaro, tags along.

Juan and Don Genaro try to go by cart to Buenos Aires, but the vehicle gets stuck, so they take the train instead. Once in Buenos Aires, they ask for directions and end up chasing a fleeing streetcar that takes them all the way to Gran's mansion. Don Genaro gets in trouble for smoking in the streetcar, and decides not to be involved in María's rescue, preferring instead to go shopping for supplies. Juan infiltrates the mansion and waits for Don Gran to arrive; he then fights Gran and overpowers him. María, who had been previously assaulted by Gran, is supposed dead by Juan and he mourns her.

As María wakes up, Gran creeps up behind Juan, ready to kill him, but Juan blocks the stab and overcomes him once more. As Juan is about to kill Gran, María stops him, claiming that a gaucho would never kill a defenseless man. They escape the mansion and happily board the train home. The last shot shows Don Genaro on his way to the train, losing his step and scattering his supplies all over the street. He picks them up, waving young boys away, and picks his way up.

After María and Juan return to the country, Gran plans a revenge. He talks to the "comisario" and falsely accuses Juan of being a "cuatrero". The comisario begins a search for Juan. María tells Juan to escape. Juan finds Gran and starts a pursuit on horses. Gran reaches a "zanja" and falls down. Juan goes down and try to help him, but Gran dies. Justice wins. The film ends.

== Re-release ==
The film was re-released in 2003 at the Polish Latin American Film Festival on June 28. It was also featured in 2008 at the Mar del Plata International Film Festival on November 8.

== Reception ==
Nobleza gaucha was director de la Pera's debut in cinema. The film was made roughly with $20,000 in budget. The film earned about $1,000,000 upon its release, resulting in the highest-grossing Argentine film of its times. Using the money earned, de la Pera went on to make his second (and last) film in 1916, Hasta después de la muerte ("Until After Death"). The movie did poorly and caused de la Pera to retire. Since then, the movie has spanned a series of remakes, most notable of which is the 1937 remake, directed by Francisco Mugica.
