= Viejo barrio =

- Directed by: Manuel Romero
- Release date: 1937
- Country: Argentina
- Language: Spanish

Viejo barrio is a 1937 Argentine film directed and written by Manuel Romero during the Golden Age of Argentine cinema.

== Cast ==
- Ángel Magaña
- Enrique Muiño
- Elías Alippi
- Rosa Contreras
