= Nobleza gaucha (1937 film) =

- Directed by: Sebastián M. Naón
- Release date: 1937
- Running time: 81 minute
- Country: Argentina
- Language: Spanish

Nobleza gaucha is a 1937 Argentine film directed by Sebastián M. Naón. Produced during the Golden Age of Argentine cinema, it is a remake of the successful 1915 silent film Nobleza gaucha.

== Cast ==
- Olinda Bozán
- Agustín Irusta
- Marcelo Ruggero
- Venturita López
