= Ezequiel Pedro Paz =

Argentine journalist

Ezequiel Pedro Paz or José Clemente Paz Ezequiel Diaz (1871–1953) was an Argentine journalist.

He took the helm of La Prensa in 1898. He proposed a series of changes and improvements to boost the newspaper, making it the biggest newspaper in the country for over 40 years (well above the daily La Nación, which used to be the second-level newspaper circulation). The daily circulation in 1869 sold 700 copies, reached 150,000 in 1910 and exceeded 500,000 in the 30 and 40. La Prensa was considered one of the top five newspapers the globe.
