= María Padín =

Uruguayan actress (1888–1970)

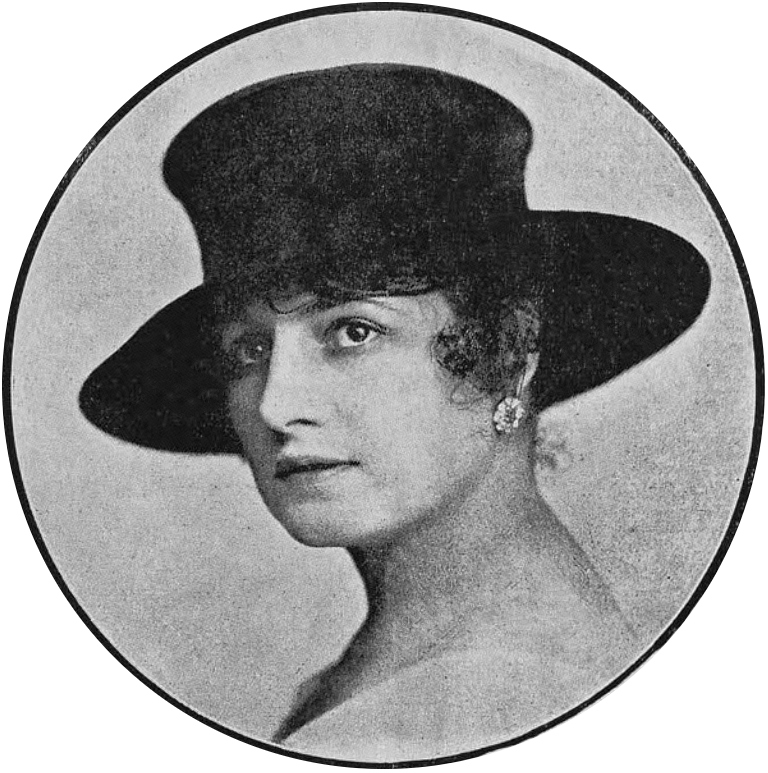
- Padín in 1917
- Born: September 15, 1888; Montevideo, Uruguay
- Died: December 21, 1970 (aged 82); Buenos Aires, Argentina
- Occupation(s): Actress, producer
- Spouse: Arturo Mario
- Parents: Manuel Padín (father); Eulalia Mendizábal (mother)

María Padín (September 15, 1888 – December 21, 1970) was a Uruguayan film, radio, and theater actress and producer who had a successful career in Argentina.

== Career ==
The daughter of circus actors Manuel Padín (the clown Padín el 77) and Eulalia Mendizábal (trapeze artist), María Padín had a sister from this marriage named Aída Padín, who would later marry Francisco Aniceto Benavente and give her a nephew, Saulo Benavente, a painter, illuminator, and scenographer. After her parents separated, Manuel Padín married the Uruguayan actress Máxima Hourquet, giving María seven half-siblings (one of whom died a young child), including the first comic actress and vedette Margarita Padín, and the young figures Pilar Padín and Fausto Padín. Her sister-in-law was the actress Raquel Oquendo.

María started working as a professional actress in 1905 with the Podestá Brothers, and later also worked in radio and television. In radio, she was the first actress of the Radio-Teatrales Argentinas companies of Ricardo Migueres and Ricardo Bustamante.

Her appearance in cinema occurred very early, starring alongside leading figures of the golden age of Argentine cinema, including Orfilia Rico, Azucena Maizani, Floren Delbene, Carlos Dux, Julio Scarcella, Celestino Petray, Santiago Arrieta, Homero Cárpena, Pedro Aleandro, Ilde Pirovano, and Domingo Sapelli. In Chile she acted in several historical silent films with her husband Arturo Mario as director.

In addition to her career on the big screen, Padín had several roles in theatrical revues. She worked for Pablo Podestá's company, directed by Pepe Podestá and with Blanca Podestá and Alberto Ballerini. After the company was dissolved, she settled for a few years in Chile and returned to form her own comedy company with advice from Dr. Oscar R. Beltrán. Then she joined her husband's company, called "Mario", which was made up of the actors Herminia Mancini, Ángeles Arguelles, Rosa Martínez, Julio Scarcella, and Pepito Petray. With this company she toured locations such as Valparaíso, Mendoza, and Lima.

In 1946 she joined the list of The Democratic Actors Grouping, during the government of Juan Perón, whose board of directors was composed of Pablo Racioppi, Lydia Lamaison, Pascual Nacaratti, Alberto Barcel, and Domingo Mania.

She was a great friend of the actress Herminia Mancini, sister of Julia Mancini, with whom she worked in theater.

== Personal life ==
Padín was married to the Italian actor and theatrical and film director Arturo Mario, with whom she moved to Chile in 1917, starring in several of his films.

== Filmography ==
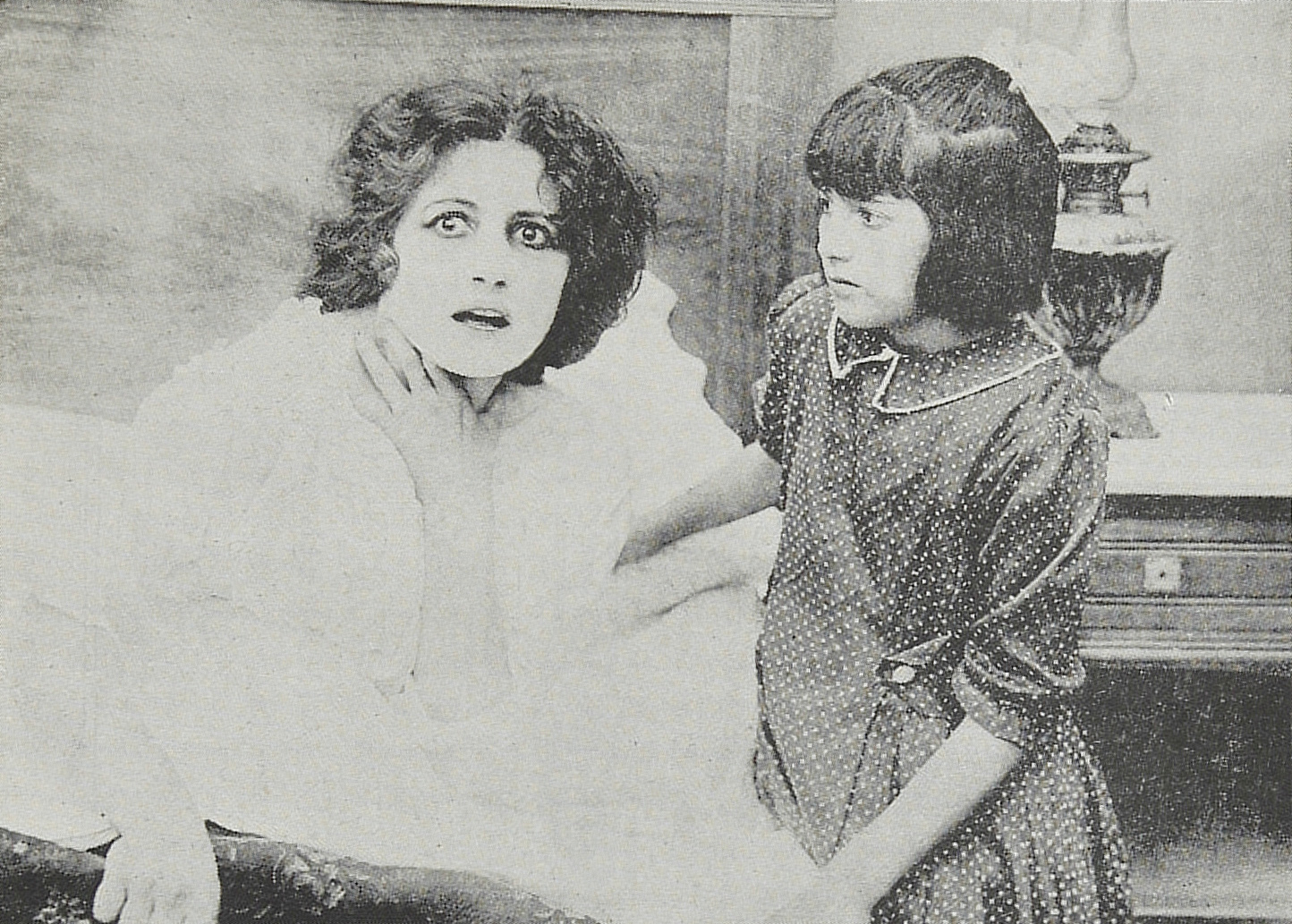
Padín in La avenida de las acacias (1918)

- 1915: Nobleza gaucha
- 1917: Alma chilena
- 1917: El fusilamiento de Dorrego
- 1918: Todo por la Patria (or Jirón de la bandera)
- 1918: La avenida de las acacias
- 1920: Manuel Rodríguez
- 1939: Nativa

== Radio ==
- 1939: Daniel Aldao, el valiente, broadcast by Radio El Mundo, headed by Héctor Coire, and featuring Meneca Norton, Lucía Dufour, Julia Vidal, Carlos A. Petit, Gustavo Cavero, and Ernesto Villegas

== Theater ==
- Los espantajos (1915), by Roberto Cayol
- La viuda influyente (1915), by Belisardo Roldán
- Los paraísos artificiales (1915), by Enrique García Velloso
- La novia de Floripondio (1915)
- Silvio Torcelli (1915)
- La suerte perra and Crisis matrimonial, by Casals
- La vuelta de Braulio (1915)
- El zonda (1915)
- El rancho de las violetas (1915)
- Barranca abajo
- Cataplasma, by Enrique Buttaro
- El tiranuelo, by Pedro B. Aquino y Misia
- Pancha, la bava
- Luz de hoguera
- Entre gallos y medianoche, premiered at the Teatro Nuevo
