= Tessa Padden =

British television presenter

- Born: England
- Occupations: Presenter; Management Training Consultant
- Website: See Hear Website

Tessa Padden-Duncan is a Deaf British television presenter and management training consultant. Padden-Duncan formerly presented the Deaf News segment of a Deaf magazine programme for the BBC, See Hear.

Padden-Duncan is a former British Sign Language (BSL) Quality and Training Manager at SignPost BSL. During the European Conference in Brussels in February 2004, Padden-Duncan was Head of Sign Language Services for Independent Media Signing (IMS). She was the founding chair of the BDA's BSL Institute and is a founding member of the BDA's Sign Academy. She was the first Deaf person to present a signed news item on a mainstream news programme, on Channel 4.
