= José C. Paz =

Argentine politician

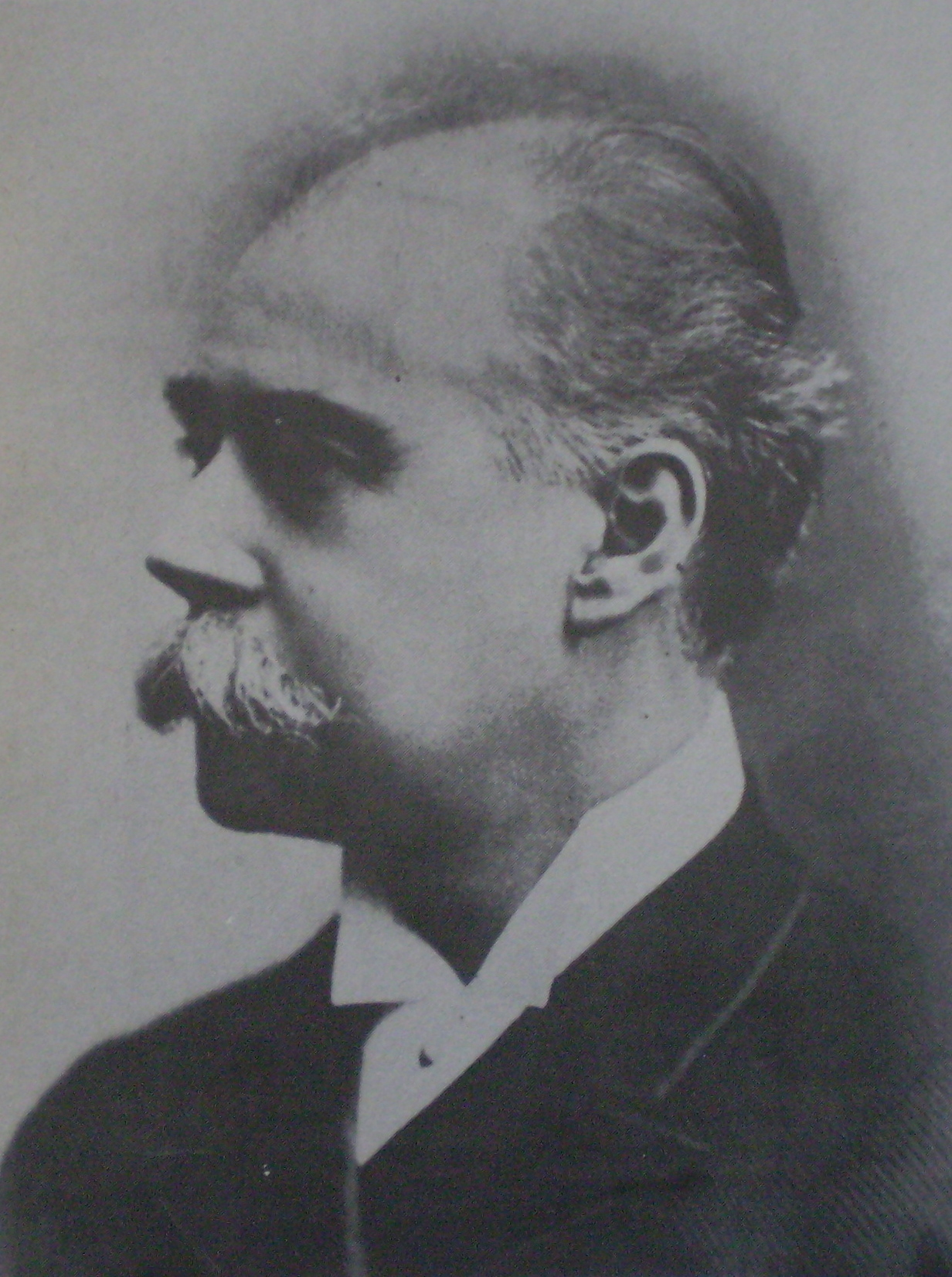
José Clemente Paz

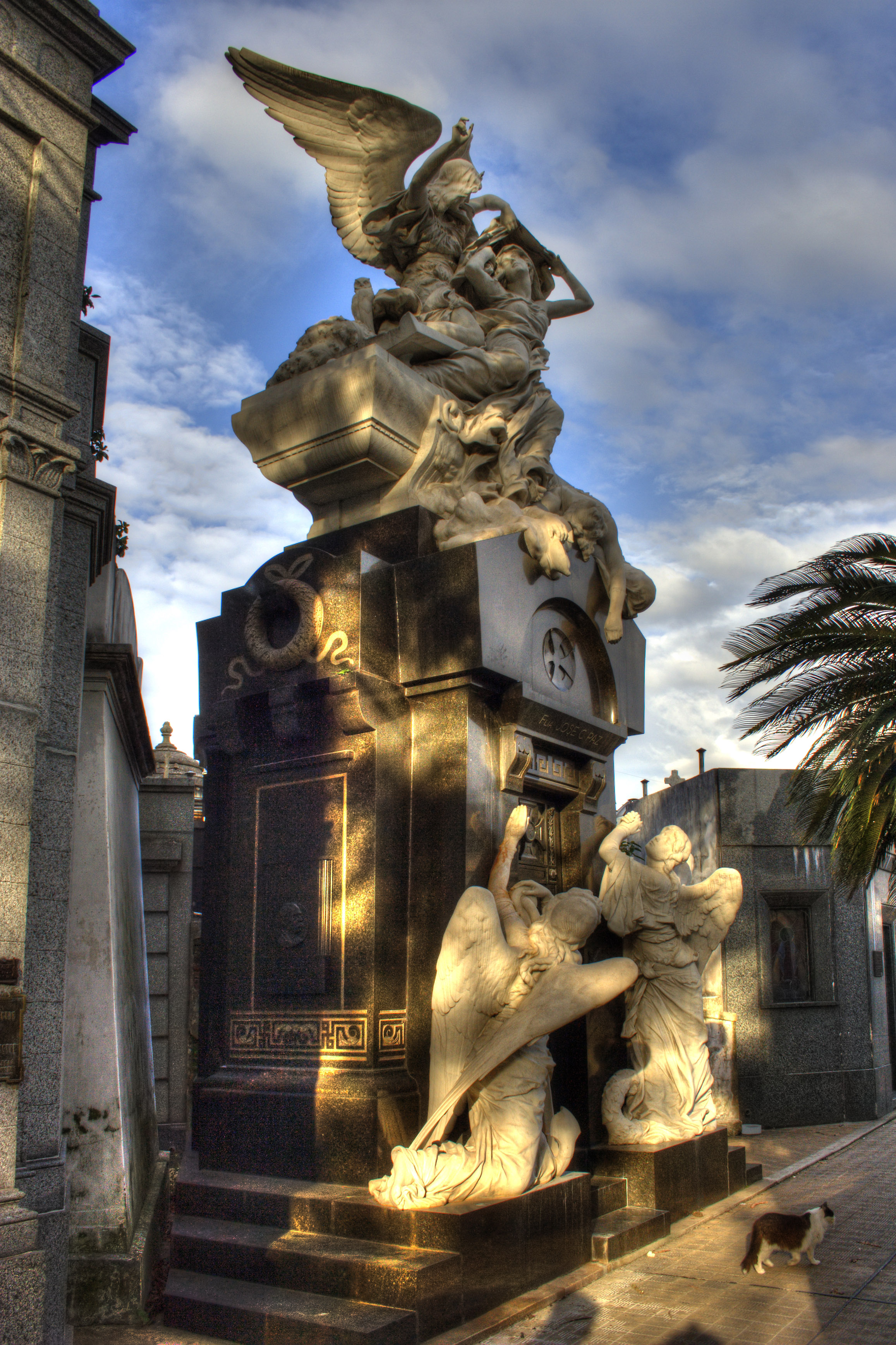
Tomb of José C. Paz in the Recoleta Cemetery in Buenos Aires

José Clemente Paz (2 October 1842 – 10 March 1912) was an Argentine politician, diplomat and journalist, founder of La Prensa.

== Life ==
Paz was born in Buenos Aires and started his education in that city but was forced to move to Rosario due to the civil war fought in Argentina. In July 1859 the Buenos Aires squadron of Admiral Murature was attempting to pass Rosario on the river. Paz, just 16 years old, approached the Rosario positions and shouted, "¡Viva Buenos Aires!" at which point the soldiers began to fire on him. Paz saved himself by jumping into the Paraná River and swimming to the Buenos Aires ships, thus returning to the city of his birth.

In Buenos Aires Paz enlisted in the Buenos Aires forces commanded by Bartolomé Mitre and in 1860 he distinguished himself at his young age at the Battle of Pavón. At the end of the war he decided to enter politics, and worked for the party of Adolfo Alsina and began studies in law. In 1865, during the War of the Triple Alliance, he founded the Society for the Protection of Invalids, a corps of nurses to treat the injured that arrived at the Port of Buenos Aires and move them to the Hospice for Invalids, also founded by Paz. To pay for the costs of these organisations, he set up a newspaper, El inválido argentino. On 18 October 1869 he founded La Prensa.

In 1871, Paz decided to organise a charity to help those suffering from yellow fever. That year the newspaper's chief reporter fell sick with yellow fever and Paz had him cared for at his own house.

In the 1874 revolution, Paz found himself on the side of Mitre once again. He was forced to live in exile in Montevideo, where he completed his studies in law. He returned to Argentina and became a national deputy in 1879. He resigned his seat to become diplomatic representative to Madrid 1883–85, then to Paris 1885–1893.

Paz returned to Argentina to manage the newspaper, and, though he relocated to Monte Carlo in 1900, he commissioned the building of a palace in the Retiro area of Buenos Aires. Designed by French architect Louis Sortais, the Paz Palace was begun in 1902 and completed in 1914. The Palace runs along the south west side of Plaza San Martín in downtown Buenos Aires and, housing over 6,000 m^{2} (65,000 ft^{2}) of space, it remains the largest single house ever built in Argentina. Its construction, however, outlived Paz, who died in Monaco in 1912. He was placed in a grand mausoleum in La Recoleta Cemetery, with a sculpture by French artist Jules-Felix Coutan.

Paz was featured on an Argentinian postage stamp.

== See also ==
- List of people on stamps of Argentina
- José C. Paz, Buenos Aires
