= La Prensa (Buenos Aires) =

Daily newspaper based in Argentina

- Type: Daily newspaper
- Format: Broadsheet
- Owner: Multimedios La Capital
- Publisher: Máximo Gainza
- Founded: 18 October 1869
- Political alignment: Conservatism
- Headquarters: Buenos Aires, Argentina
- Circulation: 100,000
- Website: http://www.laprensa.com.ar/

La Prensa is an Argentine daily newspaper. Based in Buenos Aires, it was founded by José C. Paz and ranked among the most widely circulated dailies in subsequent decades, earning a reputation for conservatism and support for British interests.

== History ==
Following the election of populist leader Juan Perón, La Prensa declined due to competition from new dailies (notably Clarín) and government pressure. This latter development culminated in the paper's April 1951 seizure by the state and its sale to the CGT labor union.

La Prensa was returned to the Gainza Paz family by the succeeding regime in 1956, though its readership never regained its pre-1951 levels. Ultimately, the company sold its landmark Avenida de Mayo headquarters in 1988 to the city, which converted it into the City Cultural Ministry.

=== Headquarters ===
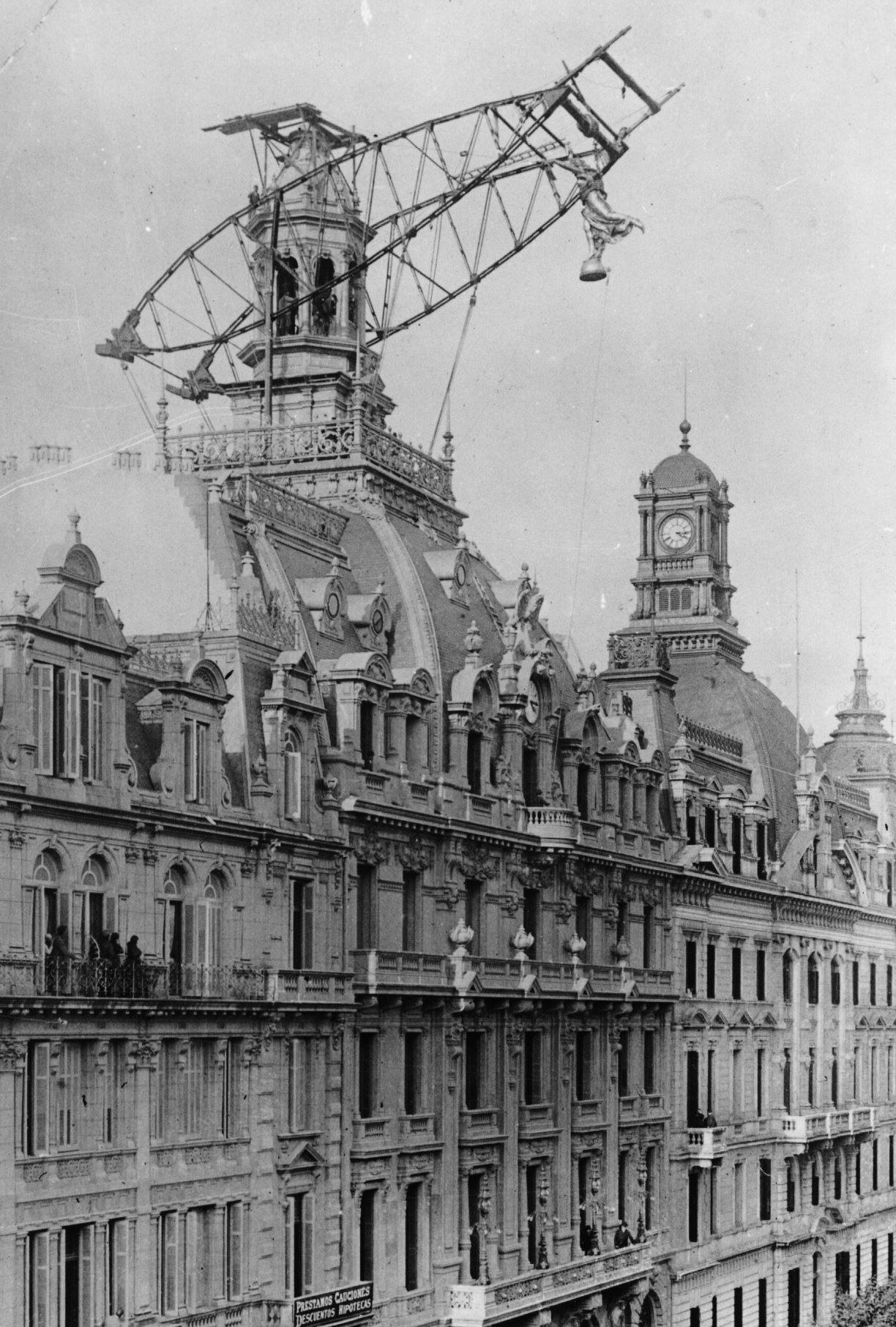
La Prensa headquarters is capped by a bronze monument to liberty in 1898
