= Bozan (disambiguation) =

Bozan is a town in Alpu district of Eskişehir Province, Turkey.

Bozan may also refer to:

== In places ==
- Bozan, Dazkırı, village in Dazkırı district of Afyonkarahisar Province, Turkey
- Bozan, Şuhut, village in Şuhut district of Afyonkarahisar Province, Turkey
- Bozan, Iran, village in Zhavarud-e Gharbi Rural District, Kalatrazan District, Sanandaj County, Kurdistan Province, Iran
- Bozan, Iraq, village in Ninewa Governorate, Iraq
- Bozan, İspir, neighbourhood in the İspir District of Erzurum Province in Turkey

== In people ==
- Alexandru Bozan (born 1948), Romanian equestrian
- Dilara Bozan (born 1997), Turkish karateka
- Elena Bozán (1916–1963), Argentine actress, dancer, and vedette
- Francisco Bozán (born 1986), Chilean football coach, and former player
- Gabriel Bozan (born 1993), Romanian kickboxer
- Haydée Bozán, Argentine actress, chorus girl, vedette, and businesswoman
- Jian Bozan (1898–1968), Chinese scholar
- Mustafa Burak Bozan (born 2000), Turkish professional footballer
- Olinda Bozán (1894–1977), Argentine film actress and comedian
- Sofía Bozán (1904–1958), Argentine film actress and tango performer
