= Olinda Bozán =

Argentine actress

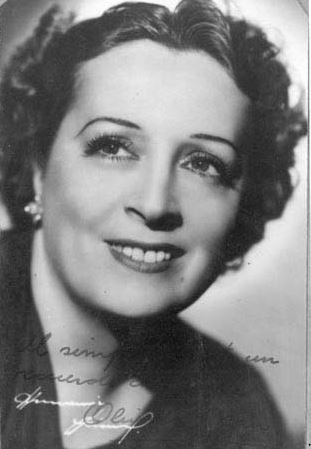
- Born: Olinda Bozán Acosta; 21 June 1894; Rosario, Santa Fe Province, Argentina
- Died: 8 February 1977 (aged 82); Buenos Aires, Argentina
- Occupation: Actress
- Years active: 1910–1977

Olinda Bozán (21 June 1894 – 8 February 1977) was an Argentine film actress and comedian of the Golden Age of Argentine cinema. Born into a circus family, she acted on the vaudeville circuit, and performed in silent and sound movies. She was trained by the Podestá brothers, one of whom she married, who have one of the most prestigious Argentine acting awards named for them. Bozán appeared in 75 films and was considered one of the best comic actors of Argentine cinema in the 20th century.

== Biography ==
Olinda Bozán Acosta was born 21 June 1894 in Rosario, Santa Fe, Argentina to Enrique Bozán (aka Bozánni) and Rosa Acosta.

She came from a theatrical family and from a very young age was involved in Circus Anselmi, owned by her parents, and trained in theatrical comedy with the Podestá brothers at the Teatro Apolo.

Her father worked as a clown, her mother did an act with trained pigeons, and all six of her siblings also worked in the circus. Her father and an older sister, Angelita, died of yellow fever when she was a young child. She was the cousin of Haydée, Elena and Sofía Bozán; sister-in-law of José and María Esther Podestá, aunt to Blanca Podestá; and married Pablo Podestá at age 14. He was thirty-four and the marriage ended quickly. At times, she said it lasted a week, at other instances saying that it lasted a month, and at others still, six months. Within the year, she was no longer married and no longer working with his acting company.

=== Early career ===
In 1910, Bozán joined a group formed by her mother, her sister Aída, Luis Vittone, and Pepe Podestá to perform at the Teatro Apolo. Her debut was in a play by Ezequiel Soria called En el fuego. Other members of the cast were Elsa Conti, Blanca Podestá, Segundo Pomar, Salvador Rosich, Humberto Scotti, and Lila Scotti. That was followed by a song and dance performance in Después de misa (1911) by Julio Sánchez Gardel, but the company disbanded and she joined Florencio Parravicini and accompanied him for the next four years.

On 27 December 1913, Bozán, José Brievaen, Rosa Catá, and Felisa Mary, premiered Una noche de Garufa at the Teatro Nacional Santa Fe.

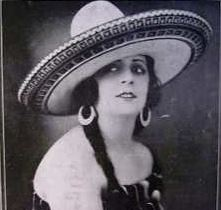
Olinda Bozán, 1927

Bozán made her film debut in the silent film, Bajo el sol de la pampa (1915) directed by Alberto Traversa, which was released in 1917. In all, she made six appearances in silent films, of which little is known. In 1923, she appeared in Sombras de Buenos Aires by Julio Irigoyen with María Esther Podestá and Totón Podestá.

In 1919, Bozán formed a company with Luis Vittone and Segundo Pomar which included María Esther Podestá, Marta Poli and José Muñiz, in comedy routines, tango and vaudeville at the Opera Theater. Many of the films and theater productions of this era were vehicles to promote tangos. Bozán premiered many, such as the first tango of Enrique Santos Discépolo, "Bizcochito", which Bozán performed in the short comedy La Porota in 1923 and "La patotera" by Manuel Jovés], Jorge Dowton, and Luis Rodríguez in El inglés de Santa Cruz at the Teatro Avenida in 1923 for the Compañía Vitone-Pomar. With this company in 1923, she traveled to Mexico and upon returning, she joined with Paco Bustos and formed her own company, under the direction of Pascual Carcavallo, (owner of the National Theater).

She hired Santiago Arrieta and Domingo Sapelli, among others, for her troupe. They staged Se casa el Negro Rancagua (1924) by Alberto Novión, La casa de barro (1924) by Antonio Saldías, El daño (1925) by Oscar Beltrán, Donde cantan los zorzales (1926) by Alberto Vacarezza, and El bandoneón (1926) by Saldías. She also hired a newcomer to Buenos Aires, Libertad Lamarque, whose debut was in a play called "La muchacha de Montmartre" by José A. Saldías. Lamarque sang as part of a trio with Bozán and Antonia Volpe, to the guitar accompaniment of Rafael Iriarte.

In 1926 Bozán formed a new company with her nephew, Paquito Bustos, the son of her late sister Angelita. She performed with him over several seasons. They debuted the tango "La Marianella la va, la va", by José Ceglie and Carlos De Paoli in La taba de la vida at the Teatro Nacional, in 1928 and the first performance of Discépolo's tango, "Yira... Yira...", in 1929 at a presentation in the Teatro Sarmiento.

Some of their most memorable productions included performances at the Teatro de la Comedia: Linyera (1929) by Ivo Pelay; Los caballeros del altillo (1929) by Florencio B. Chiarello; and Chirimoya (1930) by Enrique García Velloso and performances at the Teatro Apolo Triunvirato está de fiesta (1932) by Juan F. López; La muñeca de la gringa by Julio C. Traversa; La muchacha de circo by Alberto Novión; and Cremona (1934) by Armando Discépolo.

Así es el tango

In 1931, Bozán had a small role in Luces de Buenos Aires, the first film the singer Carlos Gardel made for Paramount Studios, France, but her first significant film in the sound-age came with Ídolos de la radio (1934), directed by Eduardo Morera with Francisco Canaro, Ada Falcón, Tito Lusiardo, and Tita Merello.

With Morera again, in 1935, she made Por buen camino, and filmed El caballo del pueblo that same year at Lumiton with Irma Córdoba and Enrique Serrano. The following year, Bozán starred opposite Gloria Guzmán and Juan Carlos Thorry in Manuel Romero's Radio Bar, and alongside Ada Cornaro, and Robert Tita in La canción de la Ribera, with director Julio Irigoyen. In 1937, in Así es el tango she was paired with Tito Lusiardo and Tita Merello in a film showcasing the music genre. Other memorable films made in the late 1930s included Las de Barranco (1938) with Homero Cárpena, Mi suegra es una fiera (1939), and Mi fortuna por un nieto (1940).

=== Middle years ===
Through the 1940s until 1955, Bozán continued to make films, perform in theater and make tango music. She traveled to Cuba in this time period and both recorded and performed.

In 1939, she appeared in a movie "Mi suegra es una fiera" directed by Luis Bayón Herrera and in 1940, staged the theatrical production with Julio Escobar. In 1942, she appeared in the film Ceniza al viento directed by Luis Saslavsky and starring Luis Arata, Santiago Arrieta, María Duval, Tita Merello, Alita Román and Berta Singerman, among others. Bozán was in the movie La danza de la fortuna in 1944 with Luis Sandrini, and had a successful run with Paquito Bustos in Maridos that same year.

In 1946, at the Teatro Nacional she led her company in a play, Los maridos quieren conga, y las mujeres también, and in 1947, in El marido de la panadera. She starred in two 1947 films, La caraba by Julio Saraceni with Francisco Avarez and Lucrecia Borgia directed by Luis Bayón Herrera with Héctor Quintanilla and Gogó Andreu.

For the 1948 season, she moved to the Teatro Buenos Aires and performed a play Hoy canta doña Rosina (pero cuida la concina) by Germán Ziclis and then moved to the Teatro Astral to do two plays: Los maridos engañan de 7 a 9 (1948), followed by the play by Tito Insausti and Arnado Malfatti ¡Adiós... plata mía!, which she performed with Diana Maggi and Francisco Alvarez.

Nuri Montsé, Olinda Bozán and Delia Garcés, "Doce Mujeres" (1939)

In 1950, she performed at the Smart Theater Bodas de plata y soltera by Manuel Meaño, which had over 100 performances and El morocho de Venecia by Carlos A. Petit and Orestes Cosentino. The 1951 film Mujeres en sombra marked a turning point in her movie roles, as after that point, there were no offers for leading roles.

For 1952, she put on the play Soltera nací, soltera moriré and Doña vitaminas at the Teatro Buenos Aires with the Compañia de Totón Podestá and in 1953, she staged La coronación de la risa at the Teatro El Nacional with Diana Maggi, José Marrone and Juanita Martínez. In 1954, she appeared in the films Criaturas adorable. In 1955, she appeared in Las calles también cantan; Vida nocturna (directed by Leo Fleider, co-starring Elsa Daniel and Olga Zubarry) and El tango en París, which was released in 1956 and would be her last film for a decade.

=== Later career ===
In 1959, she was working in television and starring in El show de Pablo Palitos. That year, she won one of the inaugural awards from the Asociación de Periodistas de la Televisión y Radiofonía Argentina (APTURA) which had been formed earlier that year. The Martín Fierro Award, the highest award for Argentine radio and television, was given to Bozán for Best comic actress. She worked on the television programme Felipe which aired in 1960 with Luis Sandrini and was revived in 1966, written by Miguel Paz and directed by Edgardo Borda. She did a season of theater, performing both El conventillo de a Paoma and Juancito de la Ribera in 1960 with Alberto Vacarezza in the Alvear Theater.

For the 1961 theatrical season, she appeared with Alberto Anchart in ¡Aquí está la vieja ola...y esta vez no viene sola! under the direction of Antonio Prat. In 1964, at the Teatro Cómico, Bozán played in Yo Llevo El Tango En El Alma, also by Ziclis and under the direction of Prat. El proceso de Mary Duggan was her 1965 theatrical endeavor with Mirtha Legrand, Francisco Petrone, Diana Maggi and Mecha Ortiz.

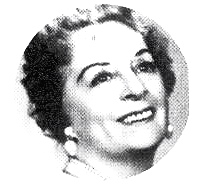
Argentine actress Olinda Bozán

Beginning in 1965, Bozán started working in films again, still comedic, but full of titillation and double entendres. Films made during this period include Hotel alojamiento (1965); La cigarra está que arde (1966); Las locas del conventillo with Analía Gadé, Alberto de Mendoza, and Mecha Ortiz; and La familia hippie (1969). In 1968 she played the lead in La decente with María Concepción César at the Teatro Blanca Podestá.

In 1970, Bozán portrayed the mother of Sandro (Roberto Sanchez) in the film Muchacho, under the direction of Leo Fleider. Her last theatrical performance was in Los ángeles de Vía Veneto in 1972 at Teatro Cómico with Mabel Manzotti. She made a series of films under the direction of Enrique Carreras, scripted by Abel Santa Cruz, and starring Gaby, Fofó, Miliki and Fofito, including: Había una vez un circo (1972), and Los padrinos (1973).

The film Los chicos crecen, directed by Carreras and co-starring Luis Sandrini, Susana Campos and Olga Zubarry was filmed in 1974, but not released until 1976. In 1975 Bozán filmed No ser débil con la vida directed by Carreras and starring Palito Ortega, Claudia Lapacó and Javier Portales.

== Death ==
She died suddenly on 8 February 1977 in Buenos Aires at the age of 82, after finishing filming the drama Las locas, which was released after her death and was dedicated to her memory.

== Legacy ==
Shortly after Bozan's death, the Film Museum dedicated the 1977 television series Olinda y las risas, as a tribute to the actress. A play, entitled "Pablo y Olinda" was written about their lives, early marriage and its almost immediate end, and Podestá's descent into madness from syphilis. It was performed in Buenos Aires at the Teatro Andamio 90 in 2011.

== Personal life ==
Around 1908, Bozán married Pablo Podestá, who was twenty years her senior. The marriage lasted less than 6 months. At the end of the 1920s, Bozán married José Següe, by whom she had a son, Enrique, who was named after her father. They remained married for a decade. She had a long-term relationship with actor Oscar Valicelli from 1941 to 1955, although they never married.

== Filmography ==
- Las locas (1977)
- La nueva cigarra (1977)
- No hay que aflojarle a la vida (1975)
- Los chantas (1975)
- Los chicos crecen (1974)
- ¡Quiero besarlo Señor! (1973)
- Los padrinos (1973)
- Había una vez un circo (1972)
- Siempre te amaré (1971)
- La familia hippie (1971)
- Muchacho (1970)
- ¡Viva la vida! (1969)
- El novicio rebelde (1968)
- En mi casa mando yo (1968)
- Coche cama, alojamiento (1967)
- La Cigarra está que arde (1967)
- Las Locas del conventillo (1966)
- Necesito una madre (1966)
- Hotel alojamiento (1966)
- Villa Delicia, playa de estacionamiento, música ambiental (1965)
- El tango en París (1956)
- Vida nocturna (1955)
- Intermezzo criminal (1953)
- Mujeres en sombra (1951)
- Modern Husbands (1948)
- Hoy cumple años mamá (1948)
- La caraba (1948)
- Lucrezia Borgia (1947)
- El Capitán Pérez (1946)
- The Dance of Fortune (1944)
- Llegó la niña Ramona (1943)
- El sillón y la gran duquesa (1943)
- Los chicos crecen (1942)
- The House of the Millions (1942)
- Ceniza al viento (1942)
- Bruma en el Riachuelo (1942)
- Mamá Gloria (1941)
- Hogar, dulce hogar (1941)
- Mi fortuna por un nieto (1940)
- Dama de compañía (1940)
- Doce mujeres (1939)
- Mi suegra es una fiera (1939)
- Los apuros de Claudina (1938)
- Las de Barranco (1938)
- Villa Discordia (1938)
- Nobleza gaucha (1937)
- Así es el tango (1937)
- Radio Bar (1936)
- The Song of the Riverside (1936)
- Por buen camino (1935)
- The Favorite (1935)
- Ídolos de la radio (1934)
- Sombres de Buenos Aires (1923)
- Bajo el sol de la pampa (1917)
