= The Desire (1944 film) =

1944 film

- Directed by: Carlos Schlieper
- Written by: Alejandro Verbitzky; Emilio Villalba Welsh
- Starring: Elsa O'Connor; Aída Luz; Roberto Airaldi
- Cinematography: Roque Funes
- Edited by: José Cardella
- Music by: Alejandro Gutiérrez del Barrio
- Release date: 1944
- Running time: 88 minutes
- Country: Argentina
- Language: Spanish

The Desire (Spanish: El deseo) is a 1944 Argentine drama film directed by Carlos Schlieper and starring Elsa O'Connor, Aída Luz and Roberto Airaldi. The film's sets were designed by the art director Juan Manuel Concado.

== Cast ==
- Elsa O'Connor as Juliana
- Aída Luz as Luisa
- Santiago Gómez Cou as Basilio
- Roberto Airaldi as Jorge
- Pilar Gómez as Amiga de Juliana
- Homero Cárpena as Ernesto
- Darío Cossier as Reinaldo
- Delfy de Ortega as Leopoldina
- César Fiaschi as Señor juez
- Francisco López Silva
- Edna Norrell
- Iris Portillo as Flora, la cocinera
- Susana Campos

== Bibliography ==
- Abel Posadas. Carlos Schlieper. Centro Editor de América Latina, 1994.
