= Aída Luz =

Argentine actress (1917–2006)

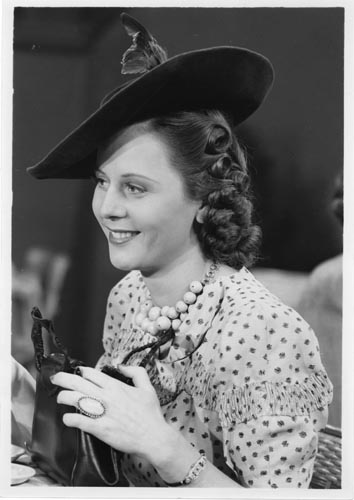
- Luz in When the Heart Sings (1941)
- Born: Aída da Luz Borbón; 10 February 1917; Buenos Aires, Argentina
- Died: 25 May 2006 (aged 89); Buenos Aires, Argentina
- Other name: Aida da Lus de Roca
- Occupation: Actress
- Years active: 1936–2001 (film)

Aída Luz (born Aída da Luz Borbón, 10 February 1917 – 25 May 2006) was an Argentine actress who primarily worked during the Golden Age of Argentine cinema, performing on both stage and in films. She won multiple awards for her performances including the Martín Fierro Awards, the ACE de Oro, the Premios Estrella de Mar and the Golden Condor from the Argentine Film Critics Association.

== Biography ==
Aída da Luz Borbón was born on 10 February 1917 in Buenos Aires, Argentina, to Juan da Luz de Roca and Josefa Borbón. Her brother Jorge Luz would also become a significant figure in the Argentine entertainment industry. She attended the Academy PAADI, and had her entertainment debut on Radio La Nación (which later became Radio Mitre) as a singer. She soon was participating in radio dramas and made the progression to acting in theater. She and her brother joined the original cast of Teatro Caminito under the direction of Cecilio Madanes and performed in plays including A Streetcar Named Desire, Steel Magnolias, Woman of the Year, and My Fair Lady, among many others.

In 1936, she had her film debut with Loco lindo, which starred Luis Sandrini and Sofía Bozán, under the direction of Arturo S. Mom. She followed with Ya tiene comisario el pueblo (1936) starring Agustín Irusta, Roberto Fugazot and Leonor Rinaldi. Some of her most noted performances were Palermo (1937), Una prueba de cariño, De la sierra al valle (1938), Los celos de Cándida (1940), Cuando canta el corazón (1941), El deseo (1946) and Los verdes paraísos (1947) by Carlos Hugo Christensen.

Several of her films of the 1940s had a variety of singing parts that were considered notable, including Cuando canta el corazón in 1941 by Richard Harlan, in which she sang several duets with Hugo del Carril; Papá tiene novia (1941) by Carlos Schlieper with Amanda Ledesma; La piel de zapa (1943) by Bayón Herrera, where she paired again with del Carril to sing “La noche de mis sueños”; Pobre mi madre querida (1947) was co-directed by Homero Manzi and Ralph Pappier and she worked with del Carril and Italian actress Emma Gramática); El último payador (1950), which was a tribute to José Betinotti; and in El patio de la morocha (1953) she premiered the tango "Patio mío" and the habanera "La retrechera".

Beginning in 1944, she starred in several stage plays, including La voz de la tórtola, Una viuda difícil, La dulce enemiga, El mal amor, Delito en la isla de las cabras, Un tranvía llamado Deseo, El carnaval del diablo, El cuervo, El patio de la morocha, and many others. Her starring roles on stage exceeded 30 productions and also included singing parts. At the end of the 1953 season, she recorded two tangos: "Los pañuelitos" and "Milonguita".

Starting in the late 1950s, Luz performed on television, participating in many series, such as Obras maestras del terror, Teatro de la noche, Las solteronas, Un cachito de vida, Esto es teatro, and many others. Among her performances on the small screen, some of her stand-out series were Matrimonios y algo más, Teatro como en el teatro with Dario Vittori, and Glorias del pasado, which was shown on Channel 7.

There were few acting awards which she had not won. Her list of awards include Konex award 1991 for lifetime achievement, the Martin Fierro, the ACE Gold, the Premio San Gabriel, the Premio Estrella de Mar, the Blanca Podesta Award, a Golden Condor, and the Trinidad Guevara Award. She was honored twice by the Argentine Film Critics Association and received the Distinction of Honor from the Mar del Plata Film Festival. Her Silver Condor Award for Best Actress came for Aquellos que amamos (1959), Silver Condor Award for Best Supporting Actress for Sábado a la noche, cine (1960) and Las furias (1960), and Best Actress in a drama on stage in “La reina de la belleza” at the 1999 ACE Awards.

She died in Buenos Aires on 25 May 2006 and was buried the following day at the Chacarita cemetery in the Pantheon of actors.

== Awards ==
- 1960 Silver Condor Award for Best Actress for Aquellos que amamos
- 1962 Silver Condor Award for Best Supporting Actress for Sábado a la noche, cine (1960) and Las furias (1960)
- 1989 Premios Estrella de Mar for Matrimonios y algo más
- 1991 Diploma of Merit, Konex Foundation for Radio and TV comedy
- 1993 Premio Sin Cortes
- 1994 Premio Blanca Podestá career achievement
- 1995 Martín Fierro Award
- 1998 ACE de Oro
- 1999 Golden Condor from the Argentine Film Critics Association
- 1999 ACE Best Actress in a drama for “La reina de la belleza”
- 2001 Diploma of Merit, Konex Foundation for theater

== Filmography ==
- Loco lindo (1936)
- Ya tiene comisario el pueblo (1936)
- Palermo (1937)
- Una prueba de Cariño (1938)
- De la sierra al valle (1938)
- Los celos de Cándida (1940)
- Amor (1940)
- Cuando canta el corazón (1941)
- Mamá Gloria (1941)
- Papá tiene novia (1941)
- Bruma en el Riachuelo (1942)
- El viaje (1942)
- La piel de zapa (1943)
- The Desire (1944)
- Mi novia es un fantasma (1944)
- La honra de los hombres (1946) de Carlos Schlieper
- El pecado de Julia (1946)
- Los verdes paraísos (1947)
- Pobre mi madre querida (1948)
- El último payador (1950)
- Lejos del cielo (1950)
- Deshonra (1952)
- El grito sagrado (1954)
- El hombre virgen (1956)
- Los tallos amargos (1956)
- Marta Ferrari (1956)
- Enigma de mujer (1956)
- Aquello que amamos (1959)
- Simiente humana (1959)
- El crack (1960)
- Sábado a la noche cine (1960)
- Las furias (1960)
- El rufián (1961)
- Canuto Cañete y los 40 ladrones (1964)
- Mi primera novia (1966)
- Quiere casarse conmigo (1967)
- Villa cariño (1967)
- Asalto a la ciudad (1968)
- En una playa junto al mar (1971)
- Juguemos en el mundo (1971)
- Gran valor en la facultad de medicina (1981)
- Gallito ciego (2000), dir. Santiago Carlos Oves

== Bibliography ==
- Melissa Fitch. Side Dishes: Latina American Women, Sex, and Cultural Production. Rutgers University Press, 2009.
