= A Woman from the Street =

Una Mujer de la calle
- Directed by: Luis Moglia Barth
- Written by: Luis Moglia Barth
- Produced by: Luis Moglia Barth
- Starring: Aida Alberti
- Release date: August 23, 1939
- Country: Argentina
- Language: Spanish

A Woman from the Street (Spanish: Una Mujer de la calle) is a 1939 Argentine drama film written and directed by Luis Moglia Barth during the Golden Age of Argentine cinema. The film premiered on August 23, 1939, in Buenos Aires and starred Aida Alberti.

== Cast ==
- Aida Alberti
- Pepita Serrador
- Roberto Airaldi
- Miguel Gómez Bao
- María Esther Buschiazzo
- José Otal
- Pablo Cumo
- Samuel Giménez
- Samuel Sanda
