= Captain Poison =

Captain Poison may refer to:

- Captain Poison (1943 film), an Argentine historical comedy drama film
- Captain Poison (1951 film), a Spanish historical comedy film
- Captain Poison, a novel by Pedro Antonio de Alarcón
