= Campeón a la fuerza =

- Directed by: Juan Sires, Enrique Ursini
- Written by: Eduardo G. Ursini, Enrique Ursini
- Starring: Alberto Closas, Pedro Quartucci, Mario Fortuna
- Cinematography: Américo Hoss
- Edited by: Nicolás Proserpio
- Music by: Adolfo R. Avilés, Daniel López Barretto
- Release date: 1950
- Running time: 80 minutes
- Country: Argentina
- Language: Spanish

Campeón a la fuerza is a 1950 Argentine comedy film of the classical era of Argentine cinema.

== Cast ==
- Alberto Closas
- Pedro Quartucci
- Mario Fortuna
- Diana Maggi
- Sofía Bozán
- Carlos Castro
- Tono Andreu
- Pedro Laxalt
- Fernando Campos
- Augusto Codecá
- Oscar Valicelli
- Gregorio Barrios
- El Hombre Montaña
- Ricardo Lorenzo
- Carmen Idal
