= Vicky Astori =

Argentinian actor

- Born: Beatriz Accarini; 4 March 1912; Zibello, Parma, Italy
- Died: 19 November 1968 (aged 56); Buenos Aires, Argentina
- Occupations: Actress and singer

Vicky Astori (née Beatriz Accarini; 4 March 1912 – 19 November 1968), known as Bice or Bicky Astori, was an Italian actress who made her career in Argentina.

== Biography ==
Astori was born in Zibello, in the Province of Parma in 1912. She travelled to Argentina in 1936, debuting in the Teatro Maipo. Thereafter, she performed operettas and dramas at various venues.

In Argentinian operettas, she worked with directors such as Juan Travé and Giovanni Quaranta, as well as with actors such as Aída Alba, Olga Castagnetta, Ángela Marini, Nené Piantanelli, Leonor Ferrari, Alba Regina, Ester Ribelli and Lydia Rossi, among others. She associated with actors and actresses of the golden age of the Argentinian cinema such as Luis Arata, Cayetano Biondo, Augusto Codecá, Margarita Tops, Irma Córdoba, Norma Giménez, Ricardo Passano, Tito Lusiardo, Rosa Catá, Eduardo Sandrini, Niní Marshall, Juan Pecci, Aída Luz and Jorge Luz, Héctor Quintanilla, Hugo of the Lane, and María Esther Ranges. In some film credits, her names appears as "Bicky".

Astori died 19 November 1968 in Buenos Aires after a long illness. She was buried in the SADAIC pantheon at the Cemetery of the Chacarita. She was 56 years old.

== Filmography ==
- 1940: The jealousies of Cándida
- 1941: The young number 13
- 1941: Napoleon
- 1941: I want to die with you like Anita
- 1941: When it sings the heart like Gloria Norton
- 1950: Holy Fire
- 1955: The Girlfriend
- 1958: The Feast of Satanás
- 1961: The Hamptones
- 1963: Un Italiano in Argentina
- 1964: Il Gaucho

== Television ==
- 1954: My camarín, novel together with Nedda Francy, Esteban Serrador, Jorge Rigaud, Enrique Chaico, Pascual Nacaratti, Frank Nelson, Adolfo Linvel and Daniel of Alvarado.
- 1954: Seven lives of woman, together with María Esther Buschiazzo, Patricia Castell, María Luisa Robledo, Martha Viana, Perla Santalla and Menchu Quesada.
- 1967: Cycle of Universal Theatre
- 1964/1968: The love has face of woman, issued by Channel 13, and starred by Iris Lainez, Bárbara Mujica, Delfy of Ortega, Angélica López Gamio and Claudia Lapacó.

== Theatre ==
- The embrujo of the tango (1952)
- The mystery of the joy, of the pain and of the glory (Mystery of the Gaudio, of the Dolore and della Gloria) (1958)
- Stéfano (1967), famous grotesco of Armando Discépolo, beside Carlos Muñoz

== Bibliography ==
- Landro, Mónica; Speroni, Marta (2005). Cine sonoro argentino. El Calafate Editores. ISBN 978-987-1038-04-6.
