= Frontera Sur (1943 film) =

- Directed by: Belisario García Villar
- Written by: Belisario García Villar
- Release date: 1943
- Running time: 65 minute
- Country: Argentina
- Language: Spanish

Frontera Sur is a 1943 Argentine film of the classical era of Argentine cinema directed by Belisario García Villar.

== Cast ==
- Inés Edmonson
- Juan Farías
- César Fiaschi
- Fernando Lamas
- Diana Maggi
- Tito Martínez
- Enrique Núñez
- Elsa O'Connor
- Juan Pérez Bilbao
- Elisardo Santalla
- Jaime Saslavsky
- Amelia Senisterra
- Froilán Varela
- Jorge Villoldo
