= A Model from Paris =

- Directed by: Luis Bayón Herrera
- Written by: Alejandro Verbitzky; Emilio Villalba Welsh
- Starring: Pedro Quartucci; Tilda Thamar; Francisco Álvarez
- Cinematography: Roque Funes
- Edited by: José Cardella
- Music by: Alejandro Gutiérrez del Barrio
- Release date: 1946
- Running time: 80 minutes
- Country: Argentina
- Language: Spanish

A Model from Paris (Spanish: Un modelo de París) is a 1946 Argentine comedy film of the classical era of Argentine cinema, directed by Luis Bayón Herrera and starring Pedro Quartucci, Tilda Thamar and Francisco Álvarez.

The film's art direction was by Juan Manuel Concado.

== Cast ==
- Pedro Quartucci
- Tilda Thamar
- Francisco Álvarez
- Yvonne Bastien
- Carlos Castro
- Delfy de Ortega
- Adrián Cuneo
- Enrique García Satur
- Alberto Terrones
- Carlos Enríquez
- María del Río

== Bibliography ==
- César Maranghello. Breve historia del cine argentino. Celesa, 2005.
