= Story of a Poor Young Man (1942 film) =

- Directed by: Luis Bayón Herrera
- Written by: Octave Feuillet (novel); Pedro E. Pico
- Starring: Hugo del Carril; Santiago Gómez Cou; Nélida Bilbao; Alberto Terrones
- Cinematography: Roque Funes
- Edited by: José Cardella
- Music by: Alejandro Gutiérrez del Barrio
- Production company: Establecimientos Filmadores Argentinos
- Release date: 13 April 1942
- Running time: 98 minutes
- Country: Argentina
- Language: Spanish

Story of a Poor Young Man (Spanish:La novela de un joven pobre) is a 1942 Argentine historical drama film directed by Luis Bayón Herrera and starring Hugo del Carril, Santiago Gómez Cou and Nélida Bilbao. It is based on the 1858 French novel of the same title by Octave Feuillet, which was later adapted again in 1968. The film's sets were designed by Juan Manuel Concado. It was released during what is considered to be the Golden Age of Argentine Cinema.

== Synopsis ==
In the 1850s a young man returns to his family home in Buenos Aires to discover that his father is financially ruined.

== Cast ==
- Hugo del Carril
- Santiago Gómez Cou
- Nélida Bilbao
- Alberto Terrones
- Consuelo Abad
- Armando Bó
- Elda Dessel
- Francisco Pablo Donadio
- Francisco López Silva
- Carlos Perelli
- Julio Scarcella

== Bibliography ==
- Goble, Alan. The Complete Index to Literary Sources in Film. Walter de Gruyter, 1999.
