= Deshonra =

- Directed by: Daniel Tinayre
- Written by: Emilio Villalba Welsh, Alejandro Verbitsky and Daniel Tinayre
- Starring: Fanny Navarro, Mecha Ortiz, Tita Merello
- Cinematography: Alberto Etchebehere
- Edited by: Nicolás Proserpio
- Music by: Julián Bautista
- Release date: 1952
- Running time: 101 minute
- Country: Argentina
- Language: Spanish

Deshonra is a 1952 Argentine film of the classical era of Argentine cinema directed by Daniel Tinayre, who was also one of the co-writers. It was the first portrayal of a lesbian love affair.

== Plot ==
Framed and convicted of a crime she did not commit, Flora, played by Fanny Navarro, is sent to prison, where she meets Roberta, played by Golde Flami. She becomes Flora's protector and lover.

== Cast ==
- Fanny Navarro
- Golde Flami
- Tita Merello
- Mecha Ortiz
- Georges Rigaud
- Aída Luz
- Blanca Lagrotta
