= Margot Abad =

Argentine film actress

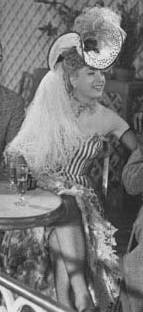
- Margot Abad in 1945
- Born: Margot Abad; Argentina
- Occupation: Actor
- Known for: Film Acting

Margot Abad was an Argentine film actress during the golden age of Argentine cinema. She performed with Luis Sandrini, Santiago Gómez Cou, Olinda Bozán, Vicente Rubino, Lolita Torres, and Héctor Quintanilla.

== Filmography ==
- 1945: La Amada Inmóvil
