= La doctora Castañuelas =

- Directed by: Luis Moglia Barth
- Written by: Luis Moglia Barth, Julio Porter
- Starring: María Antinea; Roberto Airaldi
- Cinematography: Roque Funes
- Edited by: José Cardella
- Music by: Pedro Martínez
- Release date: 1950
- Running time: 95 minutes
- Country: Argentina
- Language: Spanish

La Doctora Castañuelas is a 1950 Argentine musical comedy film directed by Luis Moglia Barth during the classical era of Argentine cinema.

== Cast ==
- María Antinea
- Roberto Airaldi
- Augusto Codecá
- Miguel Gómez Bao
- Lalo Maura
- Miriam Sucre
- Ramón J. Garay
- Francisco Pablo Donadío
- Ernesto Villegas
- Rafael Acevedo
- César Mariño
- Inés Moreno
- Alfredo Alaria
- Reynaldo Mompel
- Pablo Cumo
- Alfonso Pisano

== Reception ==
The film is said to "present a clear dichotomy between career and traditional femininity": '°It is clear that (in the film) the professional paleontologist occupies the place of the wicked stepmother and that the “good object” is the singer and dancer whom the male lead finds accommodating."
