= León Klimovsky =

Argentine film director (1906–1996)

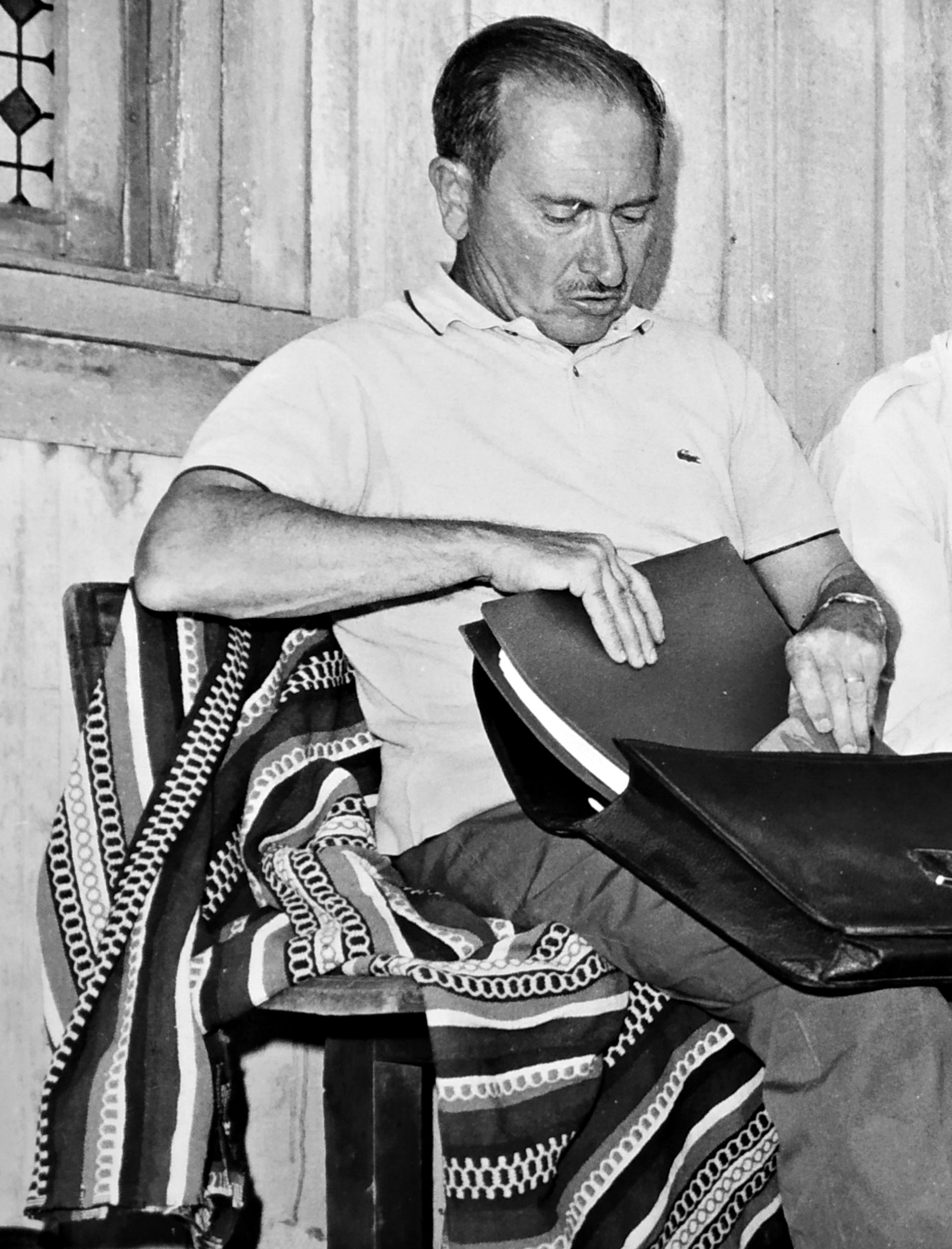
- Born: 16 October 1906; Buenos Aires, Argentina
- Died: 8 April 1996 (aged 89); Madrid, Spain
- Occupations: Film director; screenwriter; film producer

León Klimovsky Dulfán (16 October 1906 – 8 April 1996) was an Argentine film director, screenwriter and producer notable for his work during the classical era of Argentine cinema. He was known mainly for his work in Spanish cinema during the 1960s and '70s.

== Early life ==
Klimovsky was born in Buenos Aires, to Jewish emigrant parents from the Russian Empire. His brother, Gregorio Klimovsky, was a noted mathematician and philosopher. Klimovsky originally trained to be a dentist, but his real passion was always the cinema. He pioneered the Argentine cultural movement known as cineclub and financed the first Argentine movie theater to show art movies. He also founded Argentina's first film club in 1929.

== Career ==
After participating as scriptwriter and assistant director of 1944's Se abre el abismo, he filmed his first movie, an adaptation of Fyodor Dostoyevsky's The Player. He also worked on adaptations of Alexandre Dumas' The Count of Monte Cristo and Ernesto Sabato's The Tunnel.

During the 1950s, Klimovsky settled in Spain, where he became a full-time "professional" director. He directed many Spaghetti Westerns, Euro War and exploitation films, filming in Mexico, Italy, Spain and Egypt. Horror film fans best remember him for his contributions to Spain's horror film genre, beginning with La Noche de Walpurgis ("Walpurgis Night"), the film that is said to have started the Spanish horror film boom of the 1970s. Klimovsky directed famed Spanish horror icon Paul Naschy in no less than 9 films in the 1970s, while also directing other classic horror films such as "The Strange Love of the Vampires", "The Dracula Saga" and "The Vampires' Night Orgy". Naschy complimented Klimovsky's workmanlike attitude and abundant energy, but he always felt that Klimovsky rushed through many of their projects together, never allowing for sufficient retakes.

León Klimovsky always dreamt of doing great mainstream movies but ended up doing commercial exploitation films, but he had no remorse, as cinema was a vocational mandate for him. He retired from directing in 1979, at age 73.

In 1995, at age 89, he won the "Honor Award" from the Spanish Film Directors Association. He died the following year in Madrid from a heart attack.

== Filmography ==
=== Director ===
- The Gambler (1947)
- Se llamaba Carlos Gardel (1949)
- La guitarra de Gardel (1949)
- Marihuana (1950)
- La vida color de rosa (1951)
- Suburbio (1951)
- El pendiente (1951)
- The Tunnel (1952)
- La Parda Flora (1952)
- El conde de Montecristo / The Count of Monte Cristo (1953)
- Tres citas con el destino (episode Maleficio, 1954)
- El juramento de Lagardere (1955)
- El Tren Expreso (1955)
- La pícara molinera (1955)
- Viaje de novios (1956)
- Gli amanti del deserto, (1956)
- Miedo (1956)
- Viaje de novios (1956)
- Un indiano en Moratilla (1958)
- Llegaron los franceses (1959)
- Salto a la gloria (1959)
- S.O.S., abuelita (1959)
- Gharam fi sahraa (Amor en el desierto, in Arabic in Egypt, 1960)
- Un bruto para Patricia (1960)
- El hombre que perdió el tren (1960)
- Ama Rosa (1960)
- La paz empieza nunca (1960)
- Un tipo de sangre (1960)
- La danza de la fortuna (1961)
- Torrejón City (1962)
- Todos eran culpables (1962)
- Horizontes de luz (1962)
- Escuela de seductoras (1962)
- Los siete bravísimos (1964)
- Ella y el miedo (1964)
- Fuera de la ley (1964)
- Escala en Tenerife (1964)
- Aquella joven de blanco (1965)
- La colina de los pequeños diablos (1965)
- Dos mil dólares por Coyote (Django... Cacciatore di taglia) (1966)
- El bordón y la estrella (1966)
- Pochi dollari per Django (Alambradas de violencia) (1966)
- A Ghentar si muore facile (1967)
- Una chica para dos (1968)
- Un hombre vino a matar (1968)
- Hora cero: Operación Rommel (L'urlo dei giganti) (with the alias Henry Mankiewicz, 1969)
- No me importa morir (1969)
- Pagó cara su muerte (1969)
- Un dólar y una tumba (1970)
- Los hombres las prefieren viudas (1970)
- Quinto: non ammazzare (1970)
- La noche de Walpurgis/ Walpurgis Night (aka The Werewolf Vs. the Vampire Woman, 1971)
- El hombre que vino del odio (1971)
- Reverendo Colt (1971)
- Un dólar para Sartana 1971)
- La casa de las chivas (1972)
- Dr. Jekyll y el Hombre Lobo / Dr. Jekyll and the Wolf Man
- La orgía nocturna de los vampiros/ The Vampires' Night Orgy (1973)
- La saga de los Drácula aka The Dracula Saga, 1973)
- La rebelión de las muertas / Vengeance of the Zombies, 1973)
- El talón de Aquiles (1974)
- Odio mi cuerpo (1974)
- El mariscal del infierno/ The Devil's Possessed (1974)
- Una libélula para cada muerto/ A Dragonfly for Each Corpse (1974)
- Mean Mother (United States, 1974), co-directed with Al Adamson.
- Muerte de un quinqui/ Death of a Hoodlum (1975)
- Tres días de noviembre (1976)
- Secuestro/ Kidnapped (1976)
- Gritos a medianoche (1976)
- Último deseo/ The People Who Own the Dark (1976)
- ¿Y ahora qué, señor fiscal? (1977)
- El transexual (1977)
- El extraño amor de los vampiros/ The Strange Love of the Vampires (1977)
- Laverna (1978)
- La doble historia del Dr. Valmy (1978)
- Violación fatal (1978)
- La barraca (TV series, 1979)

=== Screenwriter ===
- Se abre el abismo (1945)
- 3 millones y el amor (1946)
- Albergue de mujeres (1946)
- Siete para un secreto (1947)
- La guitarra de Gardel (1949)
- La parda Flora (1952)
- El túnel (1952)
- El conde de Montecristo (1953)
- El Tren Expreso (1955)
- Miedo (1956)
- Un indiano en Moratilla (1958)
- S.O.S., abuelita (1959)
- Un bruto para Patricia (1960)
- Ama Rosa (1960)
- La paz empieza nunca (1960)
- Y el cuerpo sigue aguantando (1961)
- Todos eran culpables (1962) (dialogue)
- Horizontes de luz (1962)
- Los siete bravísimos (1964)
- Escala en Tenerife (1964)
- La colina de los pequeños diablos (1965)
- Un dólar y una tumba (1970)
- Una señora llamada Andrés (1970)
- Odio mi cuerpo (1974)

=== Producer ===
- Rodríguez supernumerario (1948)

=== Assistant director ===
- Se abre el abismo (1944)
- Viaje sin regreso (1946)
