= When Spring Makes a Mistake =

Cuando la primavera se equivoca
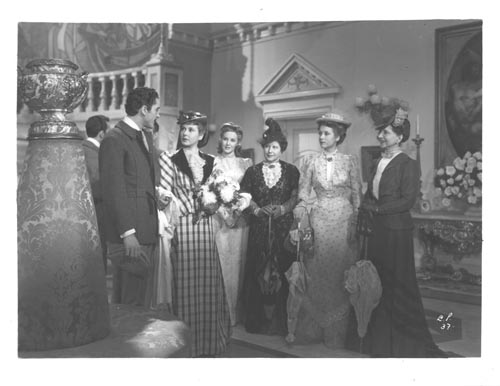
- Directed by: Mario Soffici
- Written by: Enrique Amorim, Ramón Gómez Macía
- Production company: Estudios San Miguel
- Release date: 1944
- Country: Argentina
- Language: Spanish

When Spring Makes a Mistake or Cuando la primavera se equivoca is a 1944 Argentine film of the classical era of Argentine cinema directed by Mario Soffici.

== Cast ==
- Elisa Galvé
- José Olarra
- Juan José Miguez
- Felisa Mary
- Elina Colomer
- Homero Cárpena
- Juan Carrara
- Juan José Piñeiro
- Eugenia Rico
- Matilde Rivera
- Rosa Rosen
