= Susana Martres =

Argentine actress and poet

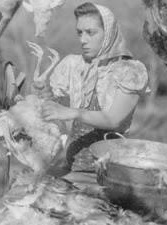
- Susana Martres in 1938.

Susana Martres (fl. 1921–1942) was an Argentine actress and poet, best remembered for her roles in From the Hills to the Valley (1938), and La luna en el pozo (1942).
