= The Two Rivals =

The Two Rivals may refer to:

- The Two Rivals (1944 film), a 1944 Argentine film
- The Two Rivals (1960 film), a 1960 Italian-Spanish film
