= Confesión =

- Directed by: Luis Moglia Barth
- Written by: Luis César Amadori, Hugo Mac Dougall, Homero Manzi, Enrique Santos Discépolo
- Produced by: Juan Sires (assistant)
- Starring: Hugo del Carril; Alberto Vila; Alita Román
- Cinematography: Alberto Etchebehere
- Edited by: Oscar Carchano, Nicolás Proserpio
- Music by: Mario Maurano, Luis Ortiz de Guinea
- Production company: Argentina Sono Film
- Release date: 23 October 1940
- Running time: 87 minutes
- Country: Argentina
- Language: Spanish

Confesión is a 1940 Argentine musical drama film of the Golden Age of Argentine cinema directed by Luis Moglia Barth and starring Hugo del Carril, Alberto Vila, and Alita Román.

== Cast ==
- Hugo del Carril... Ricardo Morales
- Alberto Vila...Ernesto
- Alita Román ...Elena Reyes
- Miguel Gómez Bao ...Director
- Ana María Lynch...Anita
- Max Citelli ... Adiestrador de gallinas
- Pablo Cumo
- César Fiaschi...Cernadas
- Pedro Fiorito...Zorzal
- Celia Geraldy ... Mujer en boite
- Iris Martorell... Sra. Bevilacqua
- Herminia Mas...Mujer en tren
- José Otal...Maldonado
- Sara Prósperi... Mujer en juego de cartas
- Juan Miguel Velich
- Oscar Villa...Paulo
- Ernesto Villegas... Néstor
- Jorge Villoldo ... Carrero
- René Cossa
