= Twelve Women =

Doce mujeres
- Directed by: Luis Moglia Barth
- Written by: Lola Pita Martínez
- Produced by: Luis Moglia Barth
- Starring: Roberto Escalada
- Cinematography: John Alton
- Music by: Mario Maurano
- Release date: 10 March 1939
- Running time: 82 minutes
- Country: Argentina
- Language: Spanish

Twelve Women (Spanish: Doce mujeres) is a 1939 Argentine comedy film of the Golden Age directed by Luis Moglia Barth and starring Roberto Escalada.

== Cast ==
- Olinda Bozán
- Paquito Busto
- Delia Garcés
- Nuri Montsé
- Roberto Escalada
- Aída Alberti
- Cecile Lezard
- Mecha López
- César Fiaschi
- Alberto Bello
- Fanny Navarro
- Tilde Pieroni
- Noemí Escalada
- Dora Pastor
