= Los Chicos crecen =

Los Chico crecen may refer to:

- Los Chicos crecen (1942 film)
- Los Chicos crecen (1976 film)
