= Emergency Ward (film) =

1952 film

- Directed by: Tulio Demicheli
- Written by: Roberto Gil
- Produced by: Enrique Faustin
- Starring: Roberto Escalada
- Cinematography: Fulvio Testi
- Edited by: Nello Melli
- Release date: 28 February 1952
- Running time: 101 minute
- Country: Argentina
- Language: Spanish

Emergency Ward (Spanish: Sala de guardia) is a 1952 Argentine film directed by Tulio Demicheli during the classical era of Argentine cinema. It was entered into the 1953 Cannes Film Festival and was one of the nominees for the Grand Prize of the Festival.

== Cast ==
- Aída Alberti
- Tito Alonso
- Arturo Arcari
- Margarita Corona
- Renée Dumas
- Roberto Escalada
- Mario Fortuna
- Analía Gadé
- Elisa Galvé (as Elisa Christian Galvé)
- Santiago Gómez Cou
- Diana Ingro
- Diana Maggi
- Lalo Malcolm
- Juan José Miguez
- Nelly Panizza
- Nathán Pinzón
- Perla Santalla
- Carlos Thompson
