= Diana Maggi =

Italian-born Argentine actress (1925–2022)

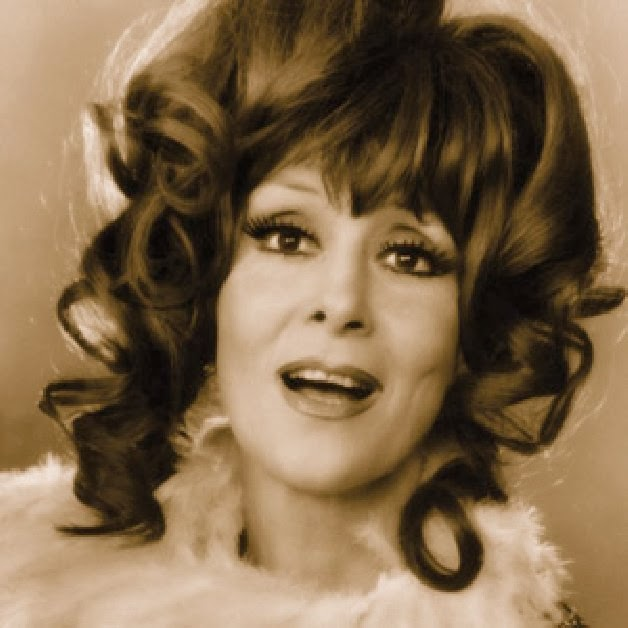
- Maggi in 1950
- Born: Graziosa Maggi; 10 June 1925; Milan, Lombardy, Italy
- Died: 15 September 2022 (aged 97)
- Occupation: Actress
- Years active: 1938–1993

Graziosa Maggi (10 June 1925 – 15 September 2022), better known as Diana Maggi, was an Italian-born Argentine film, television, radio, and stage actress who was known for starring in the 1950 film Campeón a la fuerza.

Maggi was born in Milan, Italy, on 10 June 1925. She married actor Juan Carlos Dual, after meeting him at rehearsals for a play. The couple married in 1968 and were together until Dual's death in August 2015. Maggi died on 15 September 2022, at the age of 97.

== Filmography ==
- 1938: Mujeres que trabajan as an extra
- 1943: Frontera Sur
- 1943: Las sorpresas del divorcio
- 1948: La calle grita
- 1949: Alma de bohemio
- 1949: De padre desconocido
- 1949: La doctora quiere tangos
- 1950: Campeón a la fuerza
- 1950: El morocho del Abasto (La vida de Carlos Gardel)
- 1950: El otro yo de Marcela
- 1950: Fuego sagrado
- 1950: Nacha Regules
- 1951: Concierto de bastón
- 1951: El complejo de Felipe
- 1951: The Fan
- 1952: Ésta es mi vida
- 1952: Mi noche triste
- 1952: Sala de guardia
- 1953: La Tigra
- 1953: La voz de mi ciudad
- 1953: Una ventana a la vida
- 1955: La delatora
- 1957: La sombra de Safo
- 1964: Placeres conyugales or Las Mujeres los prefieren tontos
- 1965: Nadie oyó gritar a Cecilio Fuentes
- 1965: Viaje de una noche de verano
- 1966: Hotel alojamiento
- 1969: ¡Qué noche de casamiento!
- 1970: El extraño del pelo largo
- 1971: Vuelvo a vivir...vuelvo a cantar
- 1975: La película
- 1982: Esto es vida (unreleased)
