= When the Heart Sings =

- Directed by: Richard Harlan
- Written by: Juan José Piñeiro; Rafael Solana; Rodolfo M. Taboada
- Starring: Hugo del Carril; Aída Luz; José Olarra; Felisa Mary
- Cinematography: Roque Funes
- Music by: Alejandro Gutiérrez del Barrio
- Production company: Establecimientos Filmadores Argentinos
- Distributed by: Establecimientos Filmadores Argentinos
- Release date: 6 August 1941
- Running time: 82 minutes
- Country: Argentina
- Language: Spanish

When the Heart Sings (Spanish: Cuando canta el corazón) is a 1941 Argentine musical drama film of the Golden Age of Argentine cinema, directed by Richard Harlan and starring Hugo del Carril, Aída Luz and José Olarra. A man from a wealthy background meets and marries an actress despite fierce opposition from his family.

== Cast ==
- Hugo del Carril as Martín
- Aída Luz as Lucy
- José Olarra as Don Olegario
- Felisa Mary as Doña Angélica
- Oscar Valicelli as Pedrito
- Adrián Cúneo as Coco
- María Esther Gamas as Emma
- Julio Scarcella as Di Paula
- Vicky Astori as Gloria Norton
- Eva Guerrero as Mangacha
- Joaquín Petrosino as Juancho
- Fausto Fornoni as Garrido
- Agustín Barrios as Federico
- Julio Renato as El franciscano
- Alberto Terrones as Roncales
- King Wallace as El cuidador
- Emilio Fuentes as El ilusionista
- Warly Ceriani

== Bibliography ==
- Rist, Peter H. Historical Dictionary of South American Cinema. Rowman & Littlefield, 2014.
