= An Ideal Husband (1947 Argentine film) =

1947 film

- Directed by: Luis Bayón Herrera
- Written by: Rodolfo M. Taboada
- Based on: An Ideal Husband by Oscar Wilde
- Starring: Santiago Gómez Cou; Alicia Barrié; Golde Flami
- Cinematography: Roque Funes
- Edited by: José Cardella
- Music by: Alejandro Gutiérrez del Barrio
- Production company: Establecimientos Filmadores Argentinos
- Distributed by: Establecimientos Filmadores Argentinos
- Release date: 1 October 1947
- Running time: 90 minutes
- Country: Argentina
- Language: Spanish

An Ideal Husband (Spanish: Un marido ideal) is a 1947 Argentine comedy film directed by Luis Bayón Herrera and starring Santiago Gómez Cou, Alicia Barrié and Golde Flami. It is an adaptation of the play An Ideal Husband by Oscar Wilde. The film's sets were designed by the art director Juan Manuel Concado.

== Cast ==
- Santiago Gómez Cou as Raul Campomar
- Alicia Barrié as Veronica
- Golde Flami as Laura Castellón
- Yvonne Bastien as Mabel Campomar
- Susana Campos
- René Cossa
- Francisco Pablo Donadio as Jorge de Alba
- Florindo Ferrario
- Enrique Vico Carré

== Bibliography ==
- Maranghello, César. Breve historia del cine argentino. Celesa, 2005.
- Oliveri, Ricardo García . Cine argentino: crónica de 100 años. Manrique Zago Ediciones, 1997.
