= Golde Flami =

Argentine actress (1918–2007)

- Born: Golda Flon; 10 February 1918; Ukraine
- Died: 20 July 2007 (aged 89); Buenos Aires, Argentina
- Occupation: Actress

Golde Flami (10 February 1918 – 20 July 2007) was an Argentine actress of film, television and stage.

== Early life ==
Flami was born as Golda Flon in 1918 to a Jewish family in the Russian Empire. Her family emigrated to Argentina when she was five years old. Her parents worked as a shoemaker and a dressmaker.

== Career ==
She began her acting career by working in Yiddish theater in Villa Crespo, a Jewish neighborhood in Buenos Aires. Her theater career began when she was 14 years old and her film debut came at the age of 24 with a part in the movie, En el viejo Buenos Aires.

Flami's reached her career peak in the 1940s and 1950s. Her career as an accepted actress was launched by a 1942 drama directed by Luis Bayón Herrera, Los dos rivales. She went on to star or appear in nearly 40 films and over 100 theater productions, including Witches of Salem, and nearly 40 television shows. Her film credits included Se llamaba Carlos Gardel, La Mary, Los gauchos judios and Deshonra.

She enjoyed a career resurgence in the 1980s when she appeared in several films including Fernando Ayala's Pasajeros de una pesadilla, Hector Olivera's Two to Tango and Anibal DiSalvo's Atrapadas.

== Death ==
Flami died in Buenos Aires, Argentina on 20 July 2007, aged 89.

== Selected filmography ==
- A Woman of No Importance (1945)
- An Ideal Husband (1947)
