= Horacio Priani =

Argentine actor

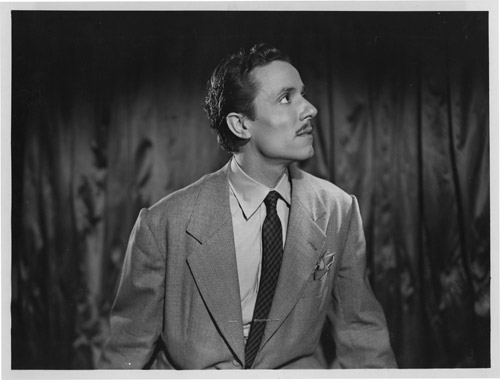
- Priani in 1947
- Born: 21 May 1912; Azul, Argentina
- Died: 29 May 1964 (aged 52); Buenos Aires, Argentina
- Occupation: Actor

Horacio Priani (21 May 1912 – 29 May 1964) was an Argentine film actor.

== Selected filmography ==
- The Gaucho Priest (1941)
- His Best Student (1944)
- Women's Refuge (1946)
- The Cat (1947)
- My Poor Beloved Mother (1948)
- Spring of Life (1957)

== Bibliography ==
- The American Film Institute Catalog of Motion Pictures Produced in the United States: Feature Films, 1961–1970: Feature Films. University of California Press, 1999.
