= Hugo Pimentel =

Argentine actor

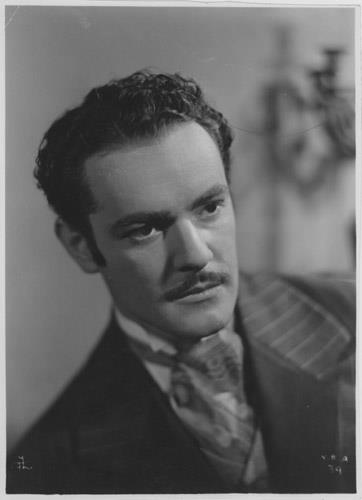
Hugo Pimentel

Hugo Pimentel (25 January 1919, in San Fernando, Buenos Aires – 1 June 1984, in Caracas) was an Argentine actor. He starred in the acclaimed Silver Condor-winning 1943 film Juvenilia. Other notable films include His Best Student (1944), La viudita naviera (1962) and A Woman of No Importance (1945).

== Selected filmography ==
- Son cartas de amor (1943)
- His Best Student (1944)
- A Woman of No Importance (1945)
- Wake Up to Life (1945)
- The Honourable Tenant (1951)
- The Blackmailers (1963)
- Man Called Gringo (1965)
- Fuerte perdido (1965)
- Goldface, the Fantastic Superman (1967)
