= Gregorio Verdi =

Argentine actor

Gregorio Verdi was an Argentine actor. He starred in the acclaimed Silver Condor-winning 1943 film Juvenilia. He also appeared in La otra y yo (1942), Puertos de ensueño (1942) and Captain Poison (1943).
