= Hotel alojamiento =

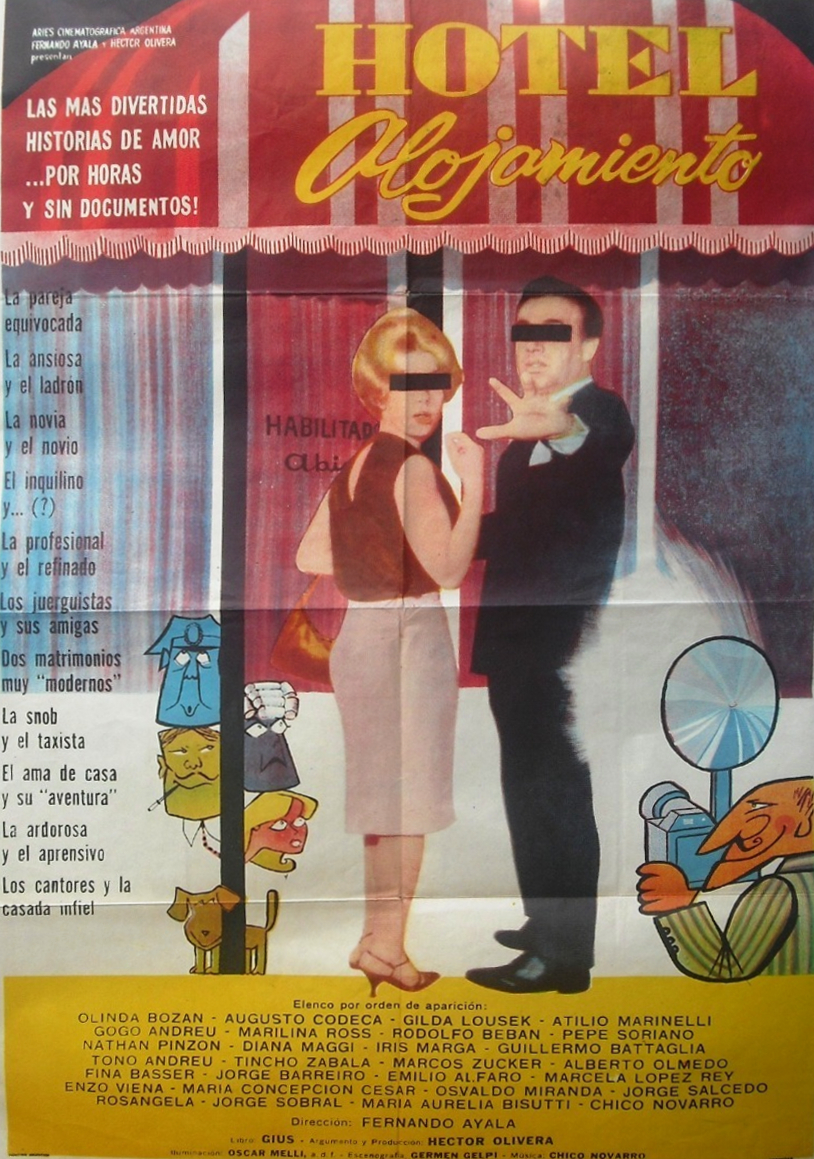
- Theatrical release poster
- Directed by: Fernando Ayala
- Written by: Augusto Giustozzi and Horacio de Dios
- Edited by: Atilio Rinaldi
- Release date: 1966
- Running time: 110 minutes
- Country: Argentina
- Language: Spanish

Hotel alojamiento is a 1966 Argentine film comedy written by Augusto Giustozzi and Horacio de Dios and directed by Fernando Ayala.

== Cast ==
- Emilio Alfaro
- Gogó Andreu
- Tono Andreu
- Rosángela Balbó
- Jorge Barreiro
- Fina Basser
- Guillermo Battaglia
- Rodolfo Bebán
- María Aurelia Bisutti
- Olinda Bozán
- Augusto Codecá
- Mariel Comber
- Rodolfo Crespi
- María Concepción César
- Cacho Espíndola
