= Rosa Rosen =

Argentine stage, television and film actress

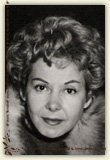
- Born: 28 August 1916; Buenos Aires, Argentina
- Died: 11 July 2004 (aged 87); Buenos Aires, Argentina
- Occupation: Actress
- Years active: 1934-1993 (film & TV)

Rosa Rosen (1916–2004) was an Argentine stage, television and film actress. Born in Buenos Aires of German and Russian descent, she made her stage debut in 1933 and her first film the following year.

== Selected filmography ==
- Loco lindo (1936)
- Los Pagares de Mendieta (1939)
- Captain Poison (1943)
- When Spring Makes a Mistake (1944)
- The New Bell (1950)

== Bibliography ==
- Finkielman, Jorge. The Film Industry in Argentina: An Illustrated Cultural History. McFarland, 2003.
