= The Song of the Riverside =

- Directed by: Julio Irigoyen
- Written by: Julio Irigoyen
- Release date: 1936
- Country: Argentina
- Language: Spanish

The Song of the Riverside (Spanish: La canción de la ribera) is a 1936 Argentine film of the Golden Age of Argentine cinema directed by Julio Irigoyen.

== Cast ==
- Olinda Bozán
- Ada Cornaro
- Totón Podestá

== Bibliography ==
- Roberto Blanco Pazos & Raúl Clemente. Diccionario de actrices del cine argentino, 1933-1997. Corregidor, 1997.
