= A Few Dollars for Django =

1966 film

- Directed by: León Klimovsky: Enzo G. Castellari
- Screenplay by: Manuel Sebares; Tito Carpi
- Story by: Manuel Sebares; Tito Carpi
- Starring: Anthony Steffen; Gloria Osuña; José Luis Lluch
- Cinematography: Aldo Pennelli
- Edited by: Antonio Gimeno
- Music by: Carlo Savina
- Production companies: Marco Film; R.M. Films
- Distributed by: Italcid
- Release date: 1966
- Running time: 87 minutes
- Countries: Italy; Spain

A Few Dollars for Django (Italian: Pochi dollari per Django) is a 1966 Italian/Spanish co-production Spaghetti Western film starring Anthony Steffen. Although credited only to León Klimovsky, it was predominantly directed by an uncredited Enzo G. Castellari.

== Plot ==
A bounty hunter named Regan wishes to settle down and begin a new life, maybe become sheriff, but a murder leads him in pursuit of bank robbers and lands him in a range war with farmers and cattlemen.

== Cast ==
- Anthony Steffen (credited as Antony Steffen) as Django Regan
- Frank Wolff as Jim Norton / Trevor Norton
- Gloria Osuna as Sally Norton
- Ennio Girolami (credited as Thomas Moore) as Sam Lister
- José Luis Lluch as Buck Dago
- Alfonso Rojas as Amos Brownsberg
- Sandalio Hernández as Smitty
- José Luis Lizalde (credited as Tomas Lizalde) as Judge's Assistant
- Ángel Ter as Judge
- Joaquín Parra as Freeman (uncredited)

== Release ==
A Few Dollars for Django was released in 1966. The film was released to television as A Few Dollars for Gypsy.
