= Il Gaucho =

- Directed by: Dino Risi
- Written by: Ruggero Maccari; Ettore Scola; Tullio Pinelli; Dino Risi
- Produced by: Mario Cecchi Gori
- Starring: Vittorio Gassman
- Cinematography: Alfio Contini
- Music by: Chico Novarro; Armando Trovajoli
- Release date: 1964
- Running time: 116 minutes
- Language: Italian

Il Gaucho (internationally released as The Gaucho) is a 1964 Italian comedy film directed by Dino Risi. It was co-produced by Clemente Lococo, an Argentinian production company, and in Argentina it was released as Un italiano en la Argentina. For his role in this film Nino Manfredi won a Grolla d'oro for best actor.

== Cast ==
- Vittorio Gassman as Marco Ravicchio
- Amedeo Nazzari as Ingegnere Marucchelli
- Nelly Panizza as Ines Marucchelli
- Jorgelina Aranda: Italia Marucchelli
- Umberto D'Orsi as Gianni Pertini
- Maria Grazia Buccella as Mara
- Annie Gorassini as Lorella
- Guido Gorgatti as Giulio
- Norberto Sánchez Calleja as Cecilio
- Maria Fiore as Maria
- Francesco Mulè as Fiorini
- Nora Cárpena as Lida
- Nino Manfredi as Stefano
- Silvana Pampanini as Luciana
- Nando Angelini as Aldo
- Nelly Tesolín as Prostitute
- Aldo Vianello
- Vicky Astori
- Amparito Castro
- Mario Mario
- José Del Vecchio
- Rafael Diserio
- Carmen Pericolo
