= Captain Poison (1943 film) =

- Directed by: Henri Martinent
- Written by: Pedro Antonio de Alarcón (novel); Enrique Amorim; Ramón Gómez Macía
- Starring: Luis Sandrini; Rosa Rosen; Bertha Moss
- Cinematography: Roque Funes
- Edited by: Oscar Carchano
- Music by: Alberto Soifer
- Production company: Establecimientos Filmadores Argentinos
- Distributed by: Establecimientos Filmadores Argentinos
- Release date: 31 March 1943
- Running time: 90 minutes
- Country: Argentina
- Language: Spanish

Captain Poison (Spanish: Capitán Veneno) is a 1943 Argentine historical comedy drama film of the classical era directed by Henri Martinent and starring Luis Sandrini, Rosa Rosen and Bertha Moss. It is based on a novel of the same title by Pedro Antonio de Alarcón. A 1951 Spanish film Captain Poison was also based on the novel.

The film's sets were designed by the art director Juan Manuel Concado.

== Cast ==
- Luis Sandrini as Jorge de Cordoba
- Rosa Rosen as Angelica
- Aline Marney
- Joaquín García León
- Bertha Moss
- Héctor Quintanilla as Médico
- María Ramos
- Gregorio Verdi
- Antonio Ballerini
- Lalo Bosch
- José Krause
- Vicente Álvarez
