= Mother Gloria =

1941 film by Richard Harlan

- Directed by: Richard Harlan
- Written by: Rodolfo M. Taboada; Augusto Cesar Vatteone
- Starring: Olinda Bozán; Aída Luz; Pedro Maratea
- Cinematography: Roque Funes
- Edited by: Establecimientos Filmadores Argentinos
- Music by: Alejandro Gutiérrez del Barrio
- Production company: Establecimientos Filmadores Argentinos
- Release date: 20 August 1941
- Running time: 90 minutes
- Country: Argentina
- Language: Spanish

Mother Gloria (Spanish:Mamá Gloria) is a 1941 Argentine comedy film of the Golden Age of Argentine cinema, directed by Richard Harlan and starring Olinda Bozán, Aída Luz and Pedro Maratea.

The film's sets were designed by the art director Juan Manuel Concado.

== Cast ==
- Olinda Bozán
- Aída Luz
- Pedro Maratea
- Oscar Valicelli
- Adrián Cuneo
- Alfredo Jordan
- Margarita Padín
- Mario Pugliese Cariño
- Adolfo Stray
- Susy del Carril
- Armando Bó
- Fausto Fornoni
- José Castro
- Morena Chiolo
- Juan Carrara
- Salvador Sinai
- José Mazilli
- Alberto Terrones
- Francisco Carollo
- Ernesto Lecuona

== Bibliography ==
- Alfred Charles Richard. Censorship and Hollywood's Hispanic image: an interpretive filmography, 1936-1955. Greenwood Press, 1993.
