= Mario Vanarelli =

Argentine art director

- Born: 21 October 1917; Buenos Aires, Argentina
- Died: 6 July 2005 (aged 87); Buenos Aires, Argentina
- Occupation: Art director
- Years active: 1943–1972 (film)

Mario Vanarelli (1917–2005) was an Argentine art director.

== Selected filmography ==
- Back in the Seventies (1945)
- Two Angels and a Sinner (1945)
- Where Words Fail (1946)
- From Man to Man (1949)
- The New Bell (1950)
- The Earring (1951)
- To Live for a Moment (1951)
- Love Never Dies (1955)
- The Candidate (1959)

== Bibliography ==
- Peter Cowie & Derek Elley. World Filmography: 1967. Fairleigh Dickinson University Press, 1977.
