= Oscar Valicelli =

Argentine film actor (1915–1999)

Oscar Valicelli (1 July 1915 – 11 October 1999) was an Argentine film and theater actor.

== Filmography ==
- La Mary (1974) dir. Daniel Tinayre …Ubaldo
- Balada para un mochilero (1971) dir. Carlos Rinaldi …El Moncho
- Desnuda en la arena (1969) dir. Armando Bo
- Fuego (1968) dir. Armando Bo …Mecánico
- Carne (1968) dir. Armando Bo …Jacinto
- La señora del intendente (1967) dir. Armando Bo …Policía
- La tentación desnuda (1966) dir. Armando Bo …Junquero 1
- Pesadilla (1963) dir. Diego Santillán …Enfermero
- La cigarra no es un bicho (1963) dir. Daniel Tinayre
- El rufián (1961) dir. Daniel Tinayre …Ángel
- Luna Park (1960) dir. Rubén W. Cavallotti
- Los torturados (1956) dir. Alberto Dubois …Raúl
- Estrellas de Buenos Aires (1956) dir. Kurt Land
- La bestia humana (1954) dir. Daniel Tinayre …Amigo de Pedro
- Mujeres en sombra (1951) dir. Catrano Catrani
- Sacachispas (1950) dir. Jerry Gómez
- Campeón a la fuerza (1950) dir. Juan Sires y Enrique Ursini
- Diez segundos (1949) dir. Alejandro Wehner y Carlos D'Agostino
- Vidalita (1948) dir. Luis Saslavsky
- Modern Husbands (1948) dir. Luis Bayón Herrera
- El que recibe las bofetadas (1947) dir Boris H. Hardy …Alfredo
- Éramos seis (1945) dir. Carlos Borcosque
- Llegó la niña Ramona (1943) dir. Catrano Catrani
- Su hermana menor (1943) dir. Enrique Cahen Salaberry
- Malambo (1942) dir. Alberto de Zavalía
- Ceniza al viento (1942) dir. Luis Saslavsky
- Vacaciones en el otro mundo (1942) dir. Mario Soffici
- Cada hogar, un mundo (1942) dir. Carlos Borcosque
- La maestrita de los obreros (1942) dir. Alberto de Zavalía
- Soñar no cuesta nada (1941) dir. Luis César Amadori
- Mother Gloria (1941) dir Richard Harlan
- When the Heart Sings (1941) dir Richard Harlan…Pedrito
- Nosotros... los muchachos (1940) dir. Carlos Borcosque
- Los ojazos de mi negra (1940) dir. Eduardo G. Ursini
- Cita en la frontera (1940) dir. Mario Soffici
- Con el dedo en el gatillo (1940) dir. Luis Moglia Barth…Américo
- Fragata Sarmiento (1940) dir. Carlos Borcosque
- ...Y mañana serán hombres (1939) dir. Carlos Borcosque …Lorenzo Fernández, "El Loro"
- Atorrante (La venganza de la tierra) (1939) dir. Enrique de Rosas
- Alas de mi patria (1939) dir. Carlos Borcosque
- Mandinga en la sierra (1939) dir. Isidoro Navarro
- Murió el sargento Laprida (1937) dir. Tito Davison…Antoñito
