= The House of the Millions =

- Directed by: Luis Bayón Herrera
- Written by: Óscar Luis Massa; Luis Bayón Herrera
- Starring: Luis Sandrini; Olinda Bozán; Héctor Quintanilla
- Cinematography: Roque Funes
- Edited by: José Cardella
- Music by: Alejandro Gutiérrez del Barrio; Alberto Soifer
- Production company: Establecimientos Filmadores Argentinos
- Release date: 1942
- Running time: 93 minutes
- Country: Argentina
- Language: Spanish

The House of the Millions (Spanish:La Casa de los millones) is a 1942 Argentine comedy film of the Golden Age of Argentine cinema, directed by Luis Bayón Herrera and starring Luis Sandrini, Olinda Bozán and Héctor Quintanilla.

== Cast ==
- Luis Sandrini
- Olinda Bozán
- Héctor Quintanilla
- Francisco López Silva
- María Luisa Notar
- Pedro Pompillo
- Rodolfo Rocha
- Sara Barrié
- Celia Podestá
- Salvador Sinai
- Angel Boffa
- Lea Briand
- Francisco Petrocino
- Roberto Bordoni
- Mariana Flor
- María Goicoechea
- Pedro González
- Rosario Granados
- Elena Marcó
