= The New Bell =

1950 film

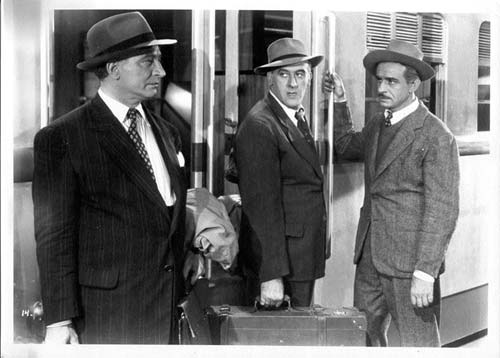
- Directed by: Luis Moglia Barth
- Written by: Ivo Pelay
- Starring: Pedro Quartucci; Rosa Rosen; Florindo Ferrario
- Cinematography: Vicente Cosentino
- Edited by: Atilio Rinaldi
- Music by: Isidro B. Maiztegui
- Production company: Artistas Argentinos Asociados
- Release date: 4 January 1950
- Country: Argentina
- Language: Spanish

The New Bell (Spanish: La campana nueva) is a 1950 Argentine comedy drama film of the classical era of Argentine cinema, directed by Luis Moglia Barth and starring Pedro Quartucci, Rosa Rosen and Florindo Ferrario. The film's sets were designed by the art director Mario Vanarelli.

== Cast ==
- Ana Arneodo
- Julio Bousquet
- Mario Cossa
- Florindo Ferrario
- Adolfo Linvel
- Juan Porta
- Pedro Quartucci
- Rosa Rosen
- Orestes Soriani

== Technical specifications ==
Runtime	1 hr 9 min (69 min)
Sound Mix	Mono
Color	Black and White

== Bibliography ==
- Plazaola, Luis Trelles. South American Cinema: Dictionary of Film Makers. La Editorial, UPR, 1989.
