= Sensational Kidnapping =

- Directed by: Luis Bayón Herrera
- Written by: Eleanor Green (novel); Luis Bayón Herrera
- Starring: Luis Sandrini; Elsa O'Connor; Osvaldo Miranda
- Cinematography: Roque Funes
- Edited by: José Cardella
- Music by: Alberto Soifer
- Production company: Establecimientos Filmadores Argentinos
- Release date: 1942
- Running time: 69 minutes
- Country: Argentina
- Language: Spanish

Sensational Kidnapping (Spanish:Secuestro sensacional) is a 1942 Argentine comedy film of the Golden Age of Argentine cinema, directed by Luis Bayón Herrera and starring Luis Sandrini, Elsa O'Connor and Osvaldo Miranda. After somebody runs away from home, it is wrongly believed they have been kidnapped.

The film's sets were designed by the art director Juan Manuel Concado.

== Cast ==
- Luis Sandrini as Juan Martínez
- Nelly Hering as Ana Suárez
- Elsa O'Connor as Leonor
- Rafael Frontaura as Carlos Suárez
- Osvaldo Miranda as Alberto Torres
- Marcelo Ruggero as Italiano
- Francisco Pablo Donadío as Juez
- Lucía Barause as María
- María Luisa Notar
- Alberto Adhemar as Policía
- Celia Podestá
- Pedro Martínez as Pedrín
- María Goicochea
- Jorge Villoldo as Portero
- Félix Tortorelli as Hombre en comida
- Martha Atoche as Mujer en comida

== Bibliography ==
- Alfred Charles Richard. Censorship and Hollywood's Hispanic image: an interpretive filmography, 1936-1955. Greenwood Press, 1993.
