= The Guitar of Gardel =

- Image poster
- Directed by: León Klimovsky
- Written by: León Klimovsky; Manuel Villegas López
- Produced by: Alberto Soifer
- Starring: Agustín Irusta; Carmen Sevilla; Antonio Casal
- Cinematography: Emilio Foriscot
- Edited by: Sara Ontañón
- Music by: Fernando Carrascosa; Alberto Soifer
- Production company: Lais
- Release date: 22 December 1949
- Running time: 85 minutes
- Countries: Argentina; Spain
- Language: Spanish

The Guitar of Gardel (Spanish:La guitarra de Gardel) is a 1949 Argentine-Spanish musical film directed by León Klimovsky and starring Agustín Irusta, Carmen Sevilla and Antonio Casal. The film is based on the life of the tango star Carlos Gardel.

== Plot ==
Raul, who has a magnificent voice, was orphaned as a child and has been educated by Felipe, a musician who encourages him to work with his voice. He advises him to get publicity by looking for a guitar that belonged to Carlos Gardel. He does so in Buenos Aires, Mexico and Spain while he is reaping success, besides finding love.

== Cast ==
- Agustín Irusta as Raúl Armada
- Carmen Sevilla as Carmelilla
- Antonio Casal as Paco
- Jorge Cardoso as Tito
- Trini Montero as Clarita
- Héctor Pontón
- Juana Mansó as Señorita Menchioti
- Santiago Rivero as Antequera
- Ana María Olaria as Novia
- César Fiaschi as Don Felipe
- Manuel Arbó as Borracho
- Manuel Requena as Rodríguez
- Manuel Guitián as Ropavejero
- María de la Vega
- Casimiro Hurtado as Cantante argentino
- Horacio Llamas
- Julio Ballesteros
- Beni Deus as Serafín Rodríguez
- José Villasante as Novio
- Guillermo Cereceda
- Aníbal Vela as Empresario
- Dante Tulián as Músico
- Hebe Dolián
- María López Morante
- Manuel de Juan as Dueño del hotel
- Miguel de los Reyes

== Reception ==
Fotogramas magazine commented on the film (translated from Spanish):

"Aged musical comedy built to the measure of the then famous Argentine singer Agustín Irusta. The slight plot anecdote, the search for a guitar that would have belonged to Carlos Gardel, is a mere pretext for the usual repertoire of tangos and the occasional sevillana. Everything takes place within the limits of zero imagination."

== Bibliography ==
- William Washabaugh. The Passion of Music and Dance. Berg, 1998.
