= Challenge of the McKennas =

1970 film

- Italian: La sfida dei MacKenna
- Directed by: León Klimovsky
- Written by: Pedro Gil Paradela; León Klimovsky; Edoardo Mulargia
- Story by: Antonio Viader
- Produced by: José Frade
- Starring: John Ireland; Robert Woods; Annabella Incontrera; Roberto Camardiel; Mariano Vidal Molina; Sergio Mendizábal; Daniela Giordano
- Cinematography: Francisco Sánchez
- Edited by: Pablo G. del Amo; Juan Pisón
- Music by: Francesco De Masi
- Production companies: Atlántida Films; Filmar Compagnia Cinematografica
- Distributed by: Paradise Film Exchange; Breien Film; José Frade PC; Menfra J.F. Films Di; Picturmedia; Video Releasing Organization
- Release date: 21 March 1970 (Italy)
- Running time: 101 minutes
- Countries: Spain; Italy

Challenge of the McKennas, also known as One Dollar and a Tomb (Italian: La sfida dei MacKenna; Spanish: Un dólar y una tumba) is a 1970 western film directed by León Klimovsky, produced by José Frade, written by Pedro Gil Paradela, scored by Francesco De Masi, and starring Robert Woods, John Ireland, Roberto Camardiel and Annabella Incontrera.

== Cast ==
- Robert Woods as Chris
- John Ireland as Jones
- Annabella Incontrera as Maggie
- Roberto Camardiel as Don Diego
- Mariano Vidal Molina as Ed Gray
- Daniela Giordano as Barbara
- Ken Wood
- Attilio Dottesio as Sheriff Bill
- Sergio Mendizábal as Doctor
- Sergio Colasanti
- Angelo Dessy
- José Antonio López
- Ferdinando Poggi
- Angelo Botti
