= Juan Manuel Concado =

Argentine art director (died 1989)

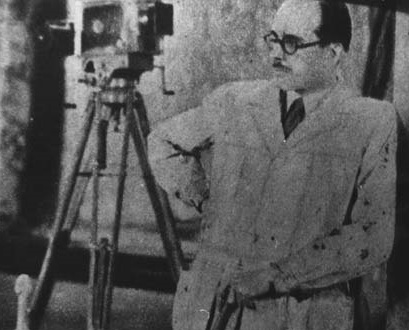
- Juan Manual Concado in 1940.
- Born: Buenos Aires, Argentina
- Died: 14 May 1989; Buenos Aires, Argentina
- Occupation: Art Director
- Years active: 1933–1952 (film)

Juan Manuel Concado (died May 14, 1989) was an Argentine art director. He designed the sets for more than ninety films during the Golden Age of Argentine Cinema.

== Selected filmography ==
- Dancing (1933)
- Mother Gloria (1941)
- Story of a Poor Young Man (1942)
- Sensational Kidnapping (1942)
- Captain Poison (1943)
- The Dance of Fortune (1944)
- The Two Rivals (1944)
- The Gambler (1947)
- Lucrecia Borgia (1947)
- An Ideal Husband (1947)
- Modern Husbands (1948)
- A Story of the Nineties (1949)

== Bibliography ==
- Mónica Landro & Marta Speroni. Cine sonoro argentino, Volume 2. El Calafate Editores, 2005.
