= My Poor Beloved Mother =

1948 film

- Directed by: Homero Manzi; Ralph Pappier
- Written by: Pascual Contursi; Homero Manzi
- Starring: Hugo del Carril; Emma Gramatica; Aída Luz; Graciela Lecube
- Cinematography: Bob Roberts
- Edited by: José Gallego; Nicolás Proserpio
- Music by: Alejandro Gutiérrez del Barrio
- Production company: Estudios San Miguel
- Release date: 28 April 1948
- Running time: 92 minutes
- Country: Argentina
- Language: Spanish

My Poor Beloved Mother (Spanish: Pobre mi madre querida) is a 1948 Argentine melodrama film of the classical era of Argentine cinema, directed by Homero Manzi and Ralph Pappier and starring Hugo del Carril, Emma Gramatica, and Aída Luz. It was based on a tango of the same name by Pascual Contursi and José Betinotti.

== Cast ==
- Hugo del Carril
- Emma Gramatica
- Aída Luz
- Graciela Lecube
- Horacio Priani
- María Esther Buschiazzo
- Leticia Scury
- Pablo Cumo
- José Franco
- Julián Bourges
- Julián Freire

== Bibliography ==
- Plazaola, Luis Trelles. South American Cinema. La Editorial, UPR, 1989.
