= Lucrezia Borgia (1947 film) =

- Directed by: Luis Bayón Herrera
- Written by: Alfred Schirokauer (novel); Rodolfo M. Taboada
- Starring: Olinda Bozán; Héctor Quintanilla; Gogó Andreu; Marcos Zucker
- Cinematography: Roque Funes
- Edited by: José Cardella
- Music by: Alejandro Gutiérrez del Barrio
- Production company: Establecimientos Filmadores Argentinos
- Release date: 29 August 1947
- Running time: 85 minutes
- Country: Argentina
- Language: Spanish

Lucrezia Borgia (Spanish:Lucrecia Borgia) is a 1947 Argentine historical film of the classical era of Argentine cinema, directed by Luis Bayón Herrera and starring Olinda Bozán, Héctor Quintanilla and Gogó Andreu. The film portrays the life of Lucrezia Borgia (1480-1519).

The film's sets were designed by the art director Juan Manuel Concado.

== Cast ==
- Olinda Bozán
- Gogó Andreu
- Héctor Quintanilla
- Marcos Zucker
- Gloria Bernal
- Marcos Caplán
- René Cossa
- Dringue Farías
- Zelmar Gueñol
- Semillita
- Carlos Tajes

== Bibliography ==
- Gillespie, Gerald & Engel, Manfred & Dieterle, Bernard. Romantic Prose Fiction. John Benjamins Publishing, 2008.
