= La Calesita =

- Directed by: Hugo del Carril
- Release date: 1963
- Running time: 100 minutes
- Country: Argentina
- Language: Spanish

La Calesita is a 1963 Argentine drama film directed by Hugo del Carril.

Listening to a melody, an old man becomes nostalgic, recalling his childhood, parents and his first love.

== Cast ==
- Hugo del Carril as Raimundo 'Goyo' Lucero
- Fanny Navarro as Azucena
- María Aurelia Bisutti
- Mario Lozano as The Raimundo's Godfather
