= Haydée Bozán =

Argentine actress, chorus girl, vedette and businesswoman

- Haydée Bozán, 1936
- Occupations: Actress, chorus girl, vedette, and businesswoman
- Years active: 1925-1938
- Relatives: Sofía Bozán and Elena Bozán (sisters); Olinda Bozán (cousin)

Haydée Bozán was an Argentine actress, chorus girl, vedette, and businesswoman. She was the sister of actresses Sofía Bozán and Elena Bozán, and cousin of Olinda Bozán.

== Career ==
Just like her sisters, Haydée took on various supporting roles in numerous films during the Golden Age of Argentine Cinema. She worked with stars like Pepe Arias, Carlos Dux, Felipe Farah, Nedda Francy, José Gola, Miguel Gómez Bao, Elena Guido, Eduardo Morera, Carlos José Pérez, Juan Siches de Alarcón, Mario Soffici and Alicia Vignoli, among others. Bozán appeared in 47 films starring Amanda Ledesma.

With her striking figure and blonde hair, Bozán dedicated herself to dance from the age of six, and formed a famous duo as the second vedette and dancer alongside her sister Elena, becoming part of the "Las 30 caras bonitas del Teatro Porteño" in 1924. This caught the attention of the young Adolfo Bioy Casares, who asked her out on a date.

In 1925, Bozán accompanied the comedic actress and singer Amanda Falcón, along with Mariano Orsi, José Vittori, José Harold, Warly Ceriani, Elena Bozán, and Waly Wais. Bozán became part of the Le Lido in Paris in 1930 due to her qualities as a bataclana. In 1933, she performed in the play Esta noche es nochebuena at the Teatro Sarmiento, with Sofía Bozán, Fernando Campos, Francisco Charmiello, Vicente Forastieri, Tito Lusiardo, Aída Olivier, and Totón Podestá, among others. In 1935, Bozán participated in several revues with scripts by Luis César Amadori and Antonio Botta, with Pepe Arias, Alicia Barrié, Sofía Bozán, Marcos Caplán, Gloria Guzmán, Julien de Meriche, Aída Olivier, Juan Carlos Thorry, and Rosarillo de Triana.

Later in life, Bozán ventured into the perfume industry with her own branded perfumes and a business called "Moda Bozán".

== Filmography ==
- 1928: La borrachera del tango
- 1936: Puerto Nuevo
- 1938: El último encuentro
