= Ambition (1939 film) =

Ambición
- Directed by: Adelqui Migliar
- Written by: José B. Cairola
- Starring: Floren Delbene; Fanny Navarro
- Release date: 1939
- Running time: 72 minute
- Country: Argentina
- Language: Spanish

Ambición is a 1939 Argentine film of the Golden Age of Argentine cinema directed by Adelqui Migliar and written by José B. Cairola. The film starred Floren Delbene and Fanny Navarro. It was the first film of Armando Bo.

It was nominated for the Best Foreign Film category at the 1939 Mussolini Cup.

== Cast ==
- Floren Delbene
- Fanny Navarro
- Alberto Anchart
- Enrique Arellano
- Armando Bo
- Gracia del Río
- Néstor Deval
- Rafael Frontaura
- Elsa Martinez
- Adolfo Meyer
- Mary Parets
- Carlos Perelli
- Eduardo Primo
- Mercedes Simone
