= Atorrante =

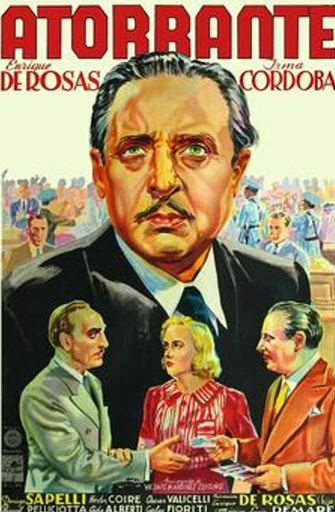
- Film poster
- Directed by: Enrique de Rosas
- Written by: Enrique de Rosas; Vicente Martínez Cuitiño
- Starring: Enrique De Rosas; Irma Córdoba
- Cinematography: Humberto Peruzzi
- Edited by: Carlos Rinaldi
- Music by: Lucio Demare
- Release date: July 1939
- Running time: 90 minutes
- Country: Argentina
- Language: Spanish

Atorrante is a 1939 Argentine film directed by and starring Enrique de Rosas and Irma Córdoba. The film is based upon the work of the same name by Vicente Martínez Cuitiño.

== Synopsis ==
A misogynist professor marries one of his students. He subsequently becomes jealous and unintentionally kills her in a bloody episode.

== Cast ==
- Enrique DeRosas
- Irma Córdoba
- Aída Alberti
- Héctor Coire
- Cirilo Etulain
- Carlos Fioriti
- José Herrero
- Ana May
- Mecha Midón
- Pascual Pelliciota
- Domingo Sapelli
- Alberto Terrones
- Oscar Valicelli

== Release and reception ==
The film premiered in July 1939. Roland, in the newspaper Crítica, opined: "Its overly intellectual conception, its overly cerebral dialogues, its overly profound problems, and its overly fervent humanity elevate 'Atorrante' above the average of Argentine productions, lending it a certain hierarchy of intention that achieves the true and necessary expression demanded by cinema." For his part, Calki wrote in El Mundo: "Its human vibrancy is diluted in the dialogue, abundant in philosophy and polemics. We prefer it to the inconsistent dialogue of so many local films, but it detracts from the film's cinematic vigor."
