= Elda Dessel =

Argentine actress

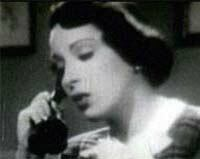
- Born: 1925; Buenos Aires, Argentina
- Died: September 17, 2010 (aged 85); Buenos Aires, Argentina
- Occupation: Actress

Elda Dessel (1925 – 17 September 2010) was an Argentine actress.

She began her career in the early 1940s, after being selected by director Luis Bayon Herrera to join the Establecimientos Filmadores Argentinos. In the early years, she made film shorts. She gained popularity in her theatrical work alongside Josefina Díaz de Artigas, Pablo Palitos, Raúl Rossi, Elena Lucena, Pepita Martín and Manuel de Sabatini, performing at the Teatro General San Martín. In the 1950s, she performed frequently with Luis Sandrini and Malvina Pastorino. Dessel continued to act in films until 1978. She dabbled in television roles until retiring in 1987. Dessel died in 2010 of unknown causes and her remains were buried at La Chacarita Cemetery. She was married twice, first with José Castro Volpe and then with Miguel Ligero.
