= Modern Husbands =

1948 film

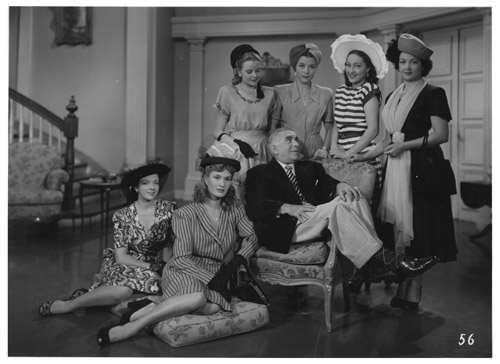
- Directed by: Luis Bayón Herrera
- Written by: Julio F. Escobar
- Starring: Olinda Bozán; Francisco Álvarez; Oscar Valicelli
- Cinematography: Roque Funes
- Edited by: José Cardella
- Release date: 19 September 1948
- Running time: 85 minutes
- Country: Argentina
- Language: Spanish

Modern Husbands (Spanish: Maridos modernos) is a 1948 Argentine comedy film of the classical era of Argentine cinema, directed by Luis Bayón Herrera and starring Olinda Bozán, Francisco Álvarez and Oscar Valicelli.

The film's art direction was by Juan Manuel Concado.

== Cast ==
- Olinda Bozán
- Francisco Álvarez
- Oscar Valicelli
- Aída Alberti
- Raimundo Pastore
- Pepita Muñoz
- Betty Lagos
- Juan José Porta
- Nelly Scheila
- Marino Seré

== Bibliography ==
- Roberto Blanco Pazos & Raúl Clemente. Diccionario de actrices del cine argentino, 1933-1997. Corregidor, 1997.
