= La Amada Inmóvil =

- Directed by: Luis Bayón Herrera
- Written by: Manuel Villegas López
- Starring: Santiago Gómez Cou; Yvonne Bastien
- Cinematography: Roque Funes
- Edited by: José Cardella
- Music by: Alberto Soifer
- Release date: July 27, 1945
- Country: Argentina
- Language: Spanish

La Amada Inmóvil (English: The Immovable Loved One) is a 1945 Argentine film of the classical era of Argentine cinema, directed and written by Luis Bayón Herrera. The film starred Santiago Gómez Cou and Yvonne Bastien as Ivonne De Lys. The film was based on the poem La Amada Inmóvil (The Immovable Loved One), written by Amado Nervo and published in 1922.

== Cast ==
- Gloria Bernal
- Homero Cárpena
- Lía Casanova
- Dario Cossier
- Alfonso Ferrari Amores
- Santiago Gómez Cou
- Isabel Pradas
- Margot Abad
