= El Grito sagrado =

- Directed by: Luis César Amadori
- Written by: Luis César Amadori; Pedro Miguel Obligado
- Starring: Fanny Navarro; Carlos Cores; Aída Luz
- Release date: 1954
- Country: Argentina
- Language: Spanish

El Grito sagrado (lit. "A Sacred Cry") is a 1954 Argentine biographical film of the classical era of Argentine cinema, directed by Luis César Amadori, co-written with Pedro Miguel Obligado, and starring Fanny Navarro, Carlos Cores and Aída Luz.

Navarro plays Mariquita Sánchez De Thompson, a socialite, activist and one of the first politically outspoken Argentine women in whose Buenos Aires living room the Argentine national anthem was sung for the first time in May 1813.

== Cast ==
- Fanny Navarro, as Mariquita Sánchez de Thompson
- Carlos Cores, Martín Thompson
- Aída Luz, as Remedios de Escalada de San Martín
- Eduardo Cuitiño, as Fray Cayetano Rodríguez
- Antonia Herrero
- Nina Brian
- Mario Lozano
- Alba Castellanos
- Antonio Martiáñez
- Alfredo Santacruz
- Luis Medina Castro
- Pedro Aleandro
- Fernando Salas
- Julián Pérez Ávila
- Rita Montero
- Jorge De La Riestra
- Francisco López Silva
- Blanca Tapia
- Francisco Iriarte
- Orestes Soriani
- Pablo Cumo
- Juan Bono
- Pascual Pellicciotta
- Manuel Perales
- Rafael Diserio
- Carlos Bianquet
