= A Woman of No Importance (1945 film) =

- Directed by: Luis Bayón Herrera
- Written by: Oscar Wilde (play); Arturo S. Mom; Luis Bayón Herrera
- Starring: Mecha Ortiz; Santiago Gómez Cou; Golde Flami; Hugo Pimentel
- Cinematography: Roque Funes
- Edited by: José Cardella
- Music by: Alberto Soifer
- Production company: Establecimientos Filmadores Argentinos
- Distributed by: Establecimientos Filmadores Argentinos
- Release date: 1 March 1945
- Running time: 85 minutes
- Country: Argentina
- Language: Spanish

A Woman of No Importance (Spanish: Una mujer sin importancia) is a 1945 Argentine comedy drama film of the classical era of Argentine cinema, directed by Luis Bayón Herrera and starring Mecha Ortiz, Santiago Gómez Cou, Golde Flami. The film is based on Oscar Wilde's 1894 play A Woman of No Importance with the action moved from London to Córdoba in central Argentina and was consequently "not considered a good possibility for U. S. exhibition".

== Cast ==
- Mecha Ortiz as Raquel Miramar
- Santiago Gómez Cou as Jorge Nájera
- Golde Flami as Sra. Allamby
- Hugo Pimentel as Gerardo Miramar
- Lidia Denis as Esther Jaunarena
- Blanca Vidal as Juana
- Lucía Barause as Vecina
- Sara Barrié as Carolina
- Yolanda Alessandrini as Sra.Sutfield
- Yuki Nambá as Vecina 2
- Lea Briand as Mujer 1
- Margarita Burke as Mujer 2
- César Mariño as Juan
- Carlos Enríquez
- Carlos A. Gordillo
- Luis Quiles
- Fanny Stein

== Critical reception ==
A review in El Bien Público found that the production remained too close to the play and lacked proper cinematic features.

The film is also listed in the Cuadernos Hispanoamericanos as one of the "unnecessary" literary adaptations that Spanish and Argentine screenwriters wrote during the 1940s.

== Bibliography ==
- Tanitch, Robert. Oscar Wilde on Stage and Screen. Methuen Publishing, 1999.
