= Hogar, dulce hogar =

- Directed by: Luis Moglia Barth
- Written by: Ladislas Fodor, Luis Moglia Barth
- Cinematography: Antonio Merayo
- Edited by: Oscar Carchano, Nicolás Proserpio
- Release date: 1941
- Country: Argentina
- Language: Spanish

Hogar, dulce hogar (English: Home, sweet home) is a 1941 Argentine film of the Golden Age of Argentine cinema directed and co-written by Luis Moglia Barth.

== Cast ==
In alphabetical order

- Olinda Bozán
- Baby Correa
- José De Angelis
- Floren Delbene
- María Esther Gamas
- Fanny Navarro
- José Otal
- Raimundo Pastore
- María Esther Podestá
- Jorge Villoldo ... Lechero
