= Trini Montero =

Spanish film actress

- Born: 1927; Madrid, Spain
- Died: 13 March 2012 (aged 84-85); Madrid, Spain
- Occupation: Actress
- Years active: 1943-1966 (film)

Trini Montero (1927 – 13 March 2012) was a Spanish film actress.

== Selected filmography ==
- The Scandal (1943)
- The Guitar of Gardel (1949)
- I'm Not Mata Hari (1949)
- Captain Poison (1951)
- Devil's Roundup (1952)
- Policarpo (1959)
- Como dos gotas de agua (1963)

== Bibliography ==
- D'Lugo, Marvin. Guide to the Cinema of Spain. Greenwood Publishing, 1997.
