= Idols of the Radio =

Idolos de la radio
- Directed by: Eduardo Morera
- Written by: Nicolás de las Llanderas; Arnaldo Malfatti
- Produced by: Francisco Canaro
- Starring: Ada Falcon; Olinda Bozán
- Cinematography: César Sforza
- Music by: Francisco Canaro
- Distributed by: Films Ríos de la Plata
- Release date: 24 October 1934 (Argentina)
- Running time: 100 minutes
- Country: Argentina
- Language: Spanish

Idols of the Radio (Spanish: Idolos de la radio) is a 1934 Argentine musical tango film directed by Eduardo Morera, written by Nicolás de las Llanderas and Arnaldo Malfatti, and starring Ada Falcon, Tito Lusiardo and Tita Merello. It was released during the early years of the Golden Age of Argentine cinema.

== Cast ==
- Ada Falcon
- Olinda Bozán
- Ignacio Corsini
- Tito Lusiardo
- Antonio Podestá
- Pablo Osvaldo Valle
- Dora Davis
- Don Dean
- Mario Fortuna
- Eduardo de Labar
- Tita Merello
- Olga Mon
