= Goal (1936 film) =

- Directed by: Luis Moglia Barth
- Cinematography: John Alton
- Music by: Hans Diernhammer
- Production company: Argentina Sono Film
- Release date: 1936
- Running time: 72 minutes
- Country: Argentina
- Language: Spanish

Goal (Spanish:¡Goal!) is a 1936 Argentine sports film directed by Luis Moglia Barth during the Golden Age of Argentine cinema.

The film's sets were designed by Raúl Soldi.

== Cast ==
- Severo Fernández
- Sofía Bozán
- Héctor Calcaño
- Marisa Cobián
- Inés Edmonson
- Pedro Fiorito
- Miguel Gómez Bao
- Pedro Quartucci
- Teresa Serrador
- Marino Seré

== Bibliography ==
- Jan Tilman Schwab. Fussball im Film: Lexikon des Fussballfilms, Volume 2. Belleville, 2006.
