= Osvaldo Miranda (actor) =

Argentine actor (1915–2011)

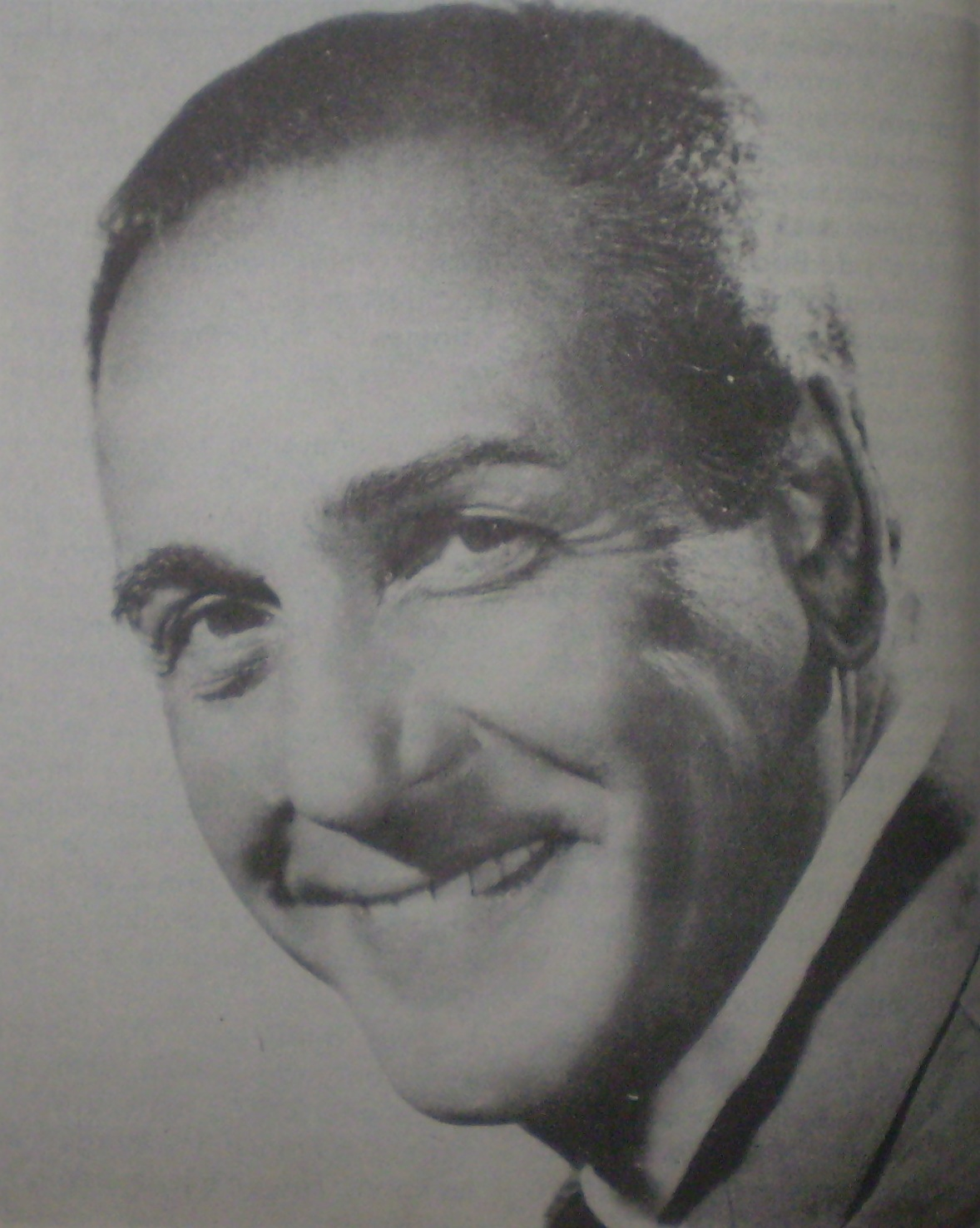
Osvaldo Miranda

Osvaldo Isaías Mathon Miranda (November 3, 1915 – April 20, 2011) was an Argentine film and television actor whose credits also included more than fifty stage productions.

He was born in Villa Crespo neighbourhood, in Buenos Aires, to Spanish immigrants. Miranda began his career as a tango dancer. His film credits included Cita en las estrellas in 1949 and a 1969 remake of the film The Boys of the Old Days Didn't Use Hair Gel, which had seen Miranda´s cinematographic debut in 1937. Miranda also appeared in numerous television roles including Mi cuñado, La nena, and the long-running television series, Escala Musical.

Miranda was the namesake of the Argentine electropop group, Miranda!.

Miranda died on April 20, 2011, in Buenos Aires at the age of 95.

== Selected filmography ==
- The Boys of the Old Days Didn't Use Hair Gel ((1937)
- Sensational Kidnapping (1942)
- The Minister's Daughter (1943)
- My Girlfriend is a Ghost (1944)
- Christmas with the Poor (1947)
- White Horse Inn (1948)
- The Honourable Tenant (1951)
