= Women's Refuge =

Woman's Refuge may refer to:

- A Women's shelter
- Women's Refuge (film), a 1946 Argentine film
