= Fanny Navarro =

Argentine actress

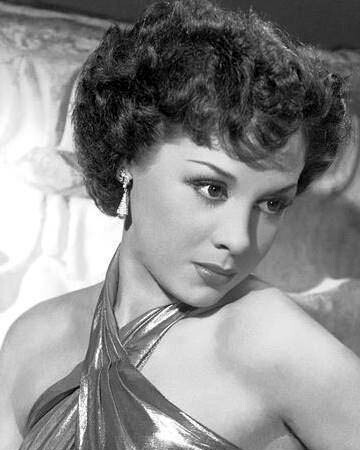
- Navarro in 1941
- Born: June 1, 1920; Buenos Aires, Argentina
- Died: March 18, 1971 (aged 50); Buenos Aires, Argentina
- Occupation: Actress

Fanny Navarro (1 June 1920 - 18 March 1971) was an Argentine actress. She starred in films such as Melodías porteñas (1937), Doce mujeres (1939), Ambición (1939), El hijo del barrio (1940), Hogar, dulce hogar (1941), Dos ángeles y un pecador (1945), Marihuana (1950), Deshonra (1952), Marta Ferrari (1956) and La Calesita (1969). Navarro was the girlfriend of Eva Perón's brother, and she was selected by Perón to head the Peronist foundation for actresses. Navarro once lost the only copy of a script written for Leopoldo Marechal's play Antigona Verez; Marechal was ordered to rewrite the entire thing.

== Filmography ==
- Melodías porteñas (1937)
- Cantando llegó el amor (1938)
- Doce mujeres (1939)
- El solterón (1939)
- Ambición (1939)
- El susto que Pérez se llevó (1940)
- El hijo del barrio (1940)
- Hogar, dulce hogar (1941)
- Sinfonía argentina (1942)
- La suerte llama tres veces (1943)
- Dos ángeles y un pecador (1945)
- El capitán Pérez (1946)
- Mujeres que bailan(1949)
- Morir en su ley (1949)
- Marihuana (1950)
- Suburbio (1951)
- Soñemos (1951) (short documentary)
- Deshonra (1952)
- El grito sagrado (1954)
- Marta Ferrari (1956)
- Allá donde el viento brama (1963)
- La calesita (1963)
- Desnuda en la arena (1969)
