= The Kids Grow Up (1976 film) =

1976 film by Enrique Carreras

- Directed by: Enrique Carreras
- Written by: Carlos Damel Camilo Darthés Augusto Giustozzi Alfredo Ruanova
- Produced by: Héctor Bailez
- Starring: Luis Sandrini; Susana Campos; Olga Zubarry
- Cinematography: Antonio Merayo
- Edited by: Jorge Gárate
- Music by: Tito Ribero
- Release date: 1976
- Running time: 87 minutes
- Country: Argentina
- Language: Spanish

The Kids Grow Up (Spanish: Los chicos crecen) is a 1976 Argentine film directed by Enrique Carreras.

== Cast ==
- Luis Sandrini as Antonio Cazenave
- Susana Campos as Cristina
- Olga Zubarry as Susana Zapiola
- Eduardo Rudy as Enrique Zapiola
- Marcelo Marcote as Carlitos Taruguito
- Olinda Bozán as Sebastiana
- Marcelo José as Eduardito
- Gabriella Toscano as Alejandra
- María Esther Gamas as Elvira
- Beba Bidart as Francisco Fiorentino
- Guido Gorgatti as Cirilo
- Rodolfo Machado
- Rodolfo Galván as Aníbal Troilo
- Julián Miró as Carlos Gardel
- Chassman
- Panchito Nolé
- Virginia Luque as Cancionista
- Nélida Rodríguez
- Nelson Avila
- Adriana Aguirre
- Enzo Bai
