= Captain Poison (1951 film) =

- Directed by: Luis Marquina
- Written by: Pedro Antonio de Alarcón (novel); Wenceslao Fernández Flórez; Luis Marquina
- Produced by: Manuel de Laza
- Starring: Sara Montiel; Fernando Fernán Gómez; Amparo Martí
- Cinematography: Juan Mariné
- Edited by: Magdalena Pulido
- Music by: Cristóbal Halffter
- Production company: Productora Roptence
- Release date: 22 November 1951
- Running time: 85 minutes
- Country: Spain
- Language: Spanish

Captain Poison (Spanish: El capitán Veneno) is a 1951 Spanish historical comedy film directed by Luis Marquina and starring Sara Montiel, Fernando Fernán Gómez and Amparo Martí. It is an adaptation of a novel of the same title by Pedro Antonio de Alarcón which had previously been made into a 1943 Argentine film and a 1945 Mexican film. The story is set in Spain during the 1840s, in the reign of Isabella II.

== Synopsis ==
Set in 1848 during the reign of Isabel II, it tells the story of Captain Jorge de Córdoba, nicknamed "Captain Poison" for his extremely conflictive character that prevents him from being at peace with anyone. Hardened bachelor and always manifesting his aversion towards the female sex, Don Jorge suffers great humiliation when he is wounded in a street riot and is saved by the young Angustias, his mother and his servant. Due to the injuries sustained, "Captain Poison" has no choice but to spend his convalescence in that home with three women, which provokes continual outbursts of temper. However, little by little, things change when the severe soldier is impacted by the internal tragedy of the family and, of course, he will end up succumbing to the charms of the beautiful Angustias.

== Main cast ==
- Sara Montiel as Angustias
- Fernando Fernán Gómez as Jorge de Córdoba
- Amparo Martí as Doña Teresa
- José Isbert as Doctor Sánchez
- Julia Caba Alba as Rosa
- Manuel Arbó as Tabernero
- Julia Lajos as Marquesa de Villadiego
- Casimiro Hurtado as Mayordomo Esteban
- Ena Sedeño as Condesa de Cañizo
- Joaquín Roa as Secretario 1º
- Manolo Morán as Marqués de Tomillares
- Trini Montero as Julita

== Bibliography ==
- de España, Rafael. Directory of Spanish and Portuguese film-makers and films. Greenwood Press, 1994.
