= Ada Falcón =

Argentine actress (1905–2002)

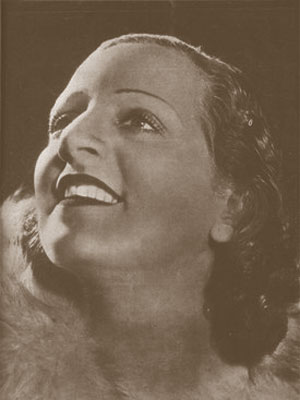
- Falcón in 1935
- Born: Aída Elsa Ada Falcone; August 17, 1905; Buenos Aires, Argentina
- Died: January 4, 2002 (aged 96); Molinari, Córdoba, Argentina
- Occupations: Actress, Tango singer.
- Years active: 1919–1942

Ada Falcón (born Aída Elsa Ada Falcone; 17 August 1905 – 4 January 2002) was an Argentine tango dancer, singer and film actress of the 1920s and 1930s. She starred in the film Ídolos de la radio in 1934. She was famous for her tango work and made over 200 recordings in the 1920s and 1930s. From the early 1920s, she shared a decade-long relationship with the Uruguayan-born Argentine orchestra leader Francisco Canaro. She mysteriously disappeared from the limelight in 1942 and lived as a recluse until she died in 2002 at age 96.

== Early life ==
Falcón was born in Buenos Aires in 1905. She started acting in theatre as a little girl of only 11 years old. She was known as "la Joyita Argentina" (the Little Argentinian Jewel). At age 13, she appeared in her first movie, El festín de los Caranchos, during the year of 1918.

As a singer, she worked in musical shows and as an actress in theatre and moving pictures. In 1925, she made her first tango recordings as a soloist with Osvaldo Fresedo's orchestra, for Victor Records.

Ada Falcón

Falcón was a mezzo-soprano, an unusual register at that times for female tango singers, most of whom were sopranos.

Falcón reached national and international fame while singing with the orchestra of Francisco Canaro. Between 1930 and 1942 she was at the peak of her artistic life: she recorded more than 200 songs, and became a wealthy artist.

== Personal life ==
During her years of popularity, Falcón enjoyed luxury items like furs, expensive jewelry and powerful automobiles. She lived in a three-story townhouse in the Buenos Aires neighborhood of Palermo.

She had a turbulent romantic relationship of ten years with Francisco Canaro, who was a married man at the time. Canaro refused to divorce his wife.

== Seclusion ==
In 1942 Falcón suddenly withdrew from public life and remained isolated in her house, avoiding contact with the outside world. She occasionally left the house to go to mass dressed entirely in black, her face covered by a net or by sunglasses, wearing a white turban and white gloves.

The cause of this withdrawal is a mystery; she never talked about it. Speculation that love disappointments with Canaro could have been an important element was never confirmed.

After a while she became a "tertiary nun" and entered an isolated convent in the hills of Córdoba Province. There she lived as a pauper by her own choice, in a small cell with little furniture and frugal meals, until she was transferred at an advanced age to a retirement home due to failing health.

She died in 2002 and is buried in the mausoleum dedicated to famous artists in Chacarita Cemetery in Buenos Aires.

== Life documentary ==
Filmmakers Lorena Munoz and Sergio Wolf made a documentary about Falcón's life, titled Yo no sé qué me han hecho tus ojos (I Don't Know What Your Eyes Have Done to Me), which was released in 2003. Although she had not allowed her picture to be taken in nearly 60 years and rarely gave interviews, she allowed the filmmakers to film an interview with her shortly before her death.

== Films ==
- El festín de los caranchos (1918)
- Tu cuna fue un conventillo (1925)
- Ídolos de la radio (1934)
- Yo no sé qué me han hecho tus ojos (2003)
