= Luis Moglia Barth =

Argentine film director and screenwriter

Luis Moglia Barth (12 April 1903 - 18 June 1984) was an Argentine film director and screenwriter, and one of the influential directors in the Golden Age of Argentine cinema. He directed some 30 films between 1927 and 1959, often screenwriting for his pictures. He died in Buenos Aires, aged 81.

== Filmography ==
Director:

- Puños, chárleston y besos (1927)
- El 90 (1928)
- Consejo de tango (1932)
- ¡Tango! (1933)
- Dancing (1933)
- Riachuelo (1934)
- Picaflor (1935)
- Amalia (1936)
- Santos Vega (1936)
- ¡Goal! (1936)
- Melgarejo (1937)
- La casa de Quirós (1937)
- Melodías porteñas (1937)
- El último encuentro (1938)
- Paths of Faith (1938)
- Doce mujeres (1939)
- Una mujer de la calle (1939)
- Huella (1940)
- Con el dedo en el gatillo (1940)
- Confesión (1940)
- Hogar, dulce hogar(1941)
- Fortín Alto (1941)
- Boina blanca (1941)
- Cruza (1942)
- Ponchos azules (1942)
- María Rosa (1946)
- La senda oscura (1947)
- Não Me Digas Adeus (1947)
- Juan Moreira (1948)
- Edición Extra (1949)
- The New Bell (1950)
- La fuerza ciega (1950)
- La Doctora Castañuelas (1950)
- Intermezzo criminal (1953)
- Dringue, Castrito y la lámpara de Aladino (1954)
- El cura de la sierra (1959) (TV)
