= Mario Fortuna =

Argentine actor

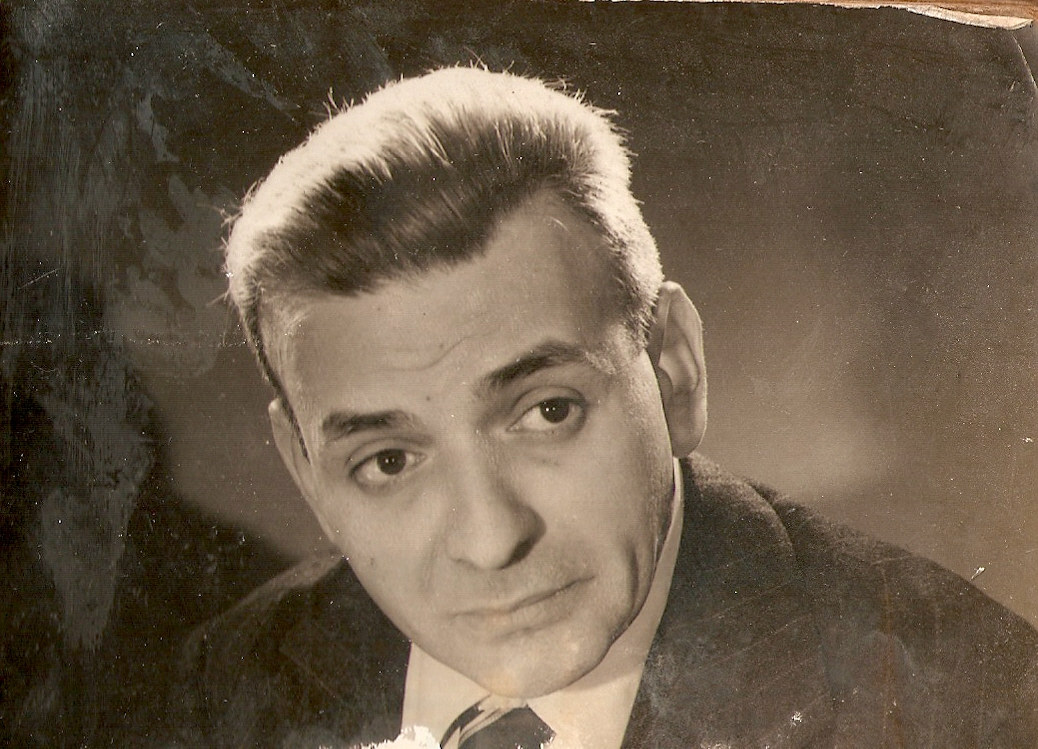
Mario Fortuna

Mario Fortuna (27 May 1911 - 11 February 1968) was an Argentine actor. He starred in the 1950 film Campeón a la fuerza and 1953's The Voice of My City.

As an actor, he is known for Idols of the Radio (1934), Pasó en mi barrio (1951) and Con el más puro amor (1966). Actor Mario Fortuna Jr is his son. He died on 11 February 1968 in Buenos Aires, Argentina.
