= Elsa O'Connor =

Argentine stage and film actress

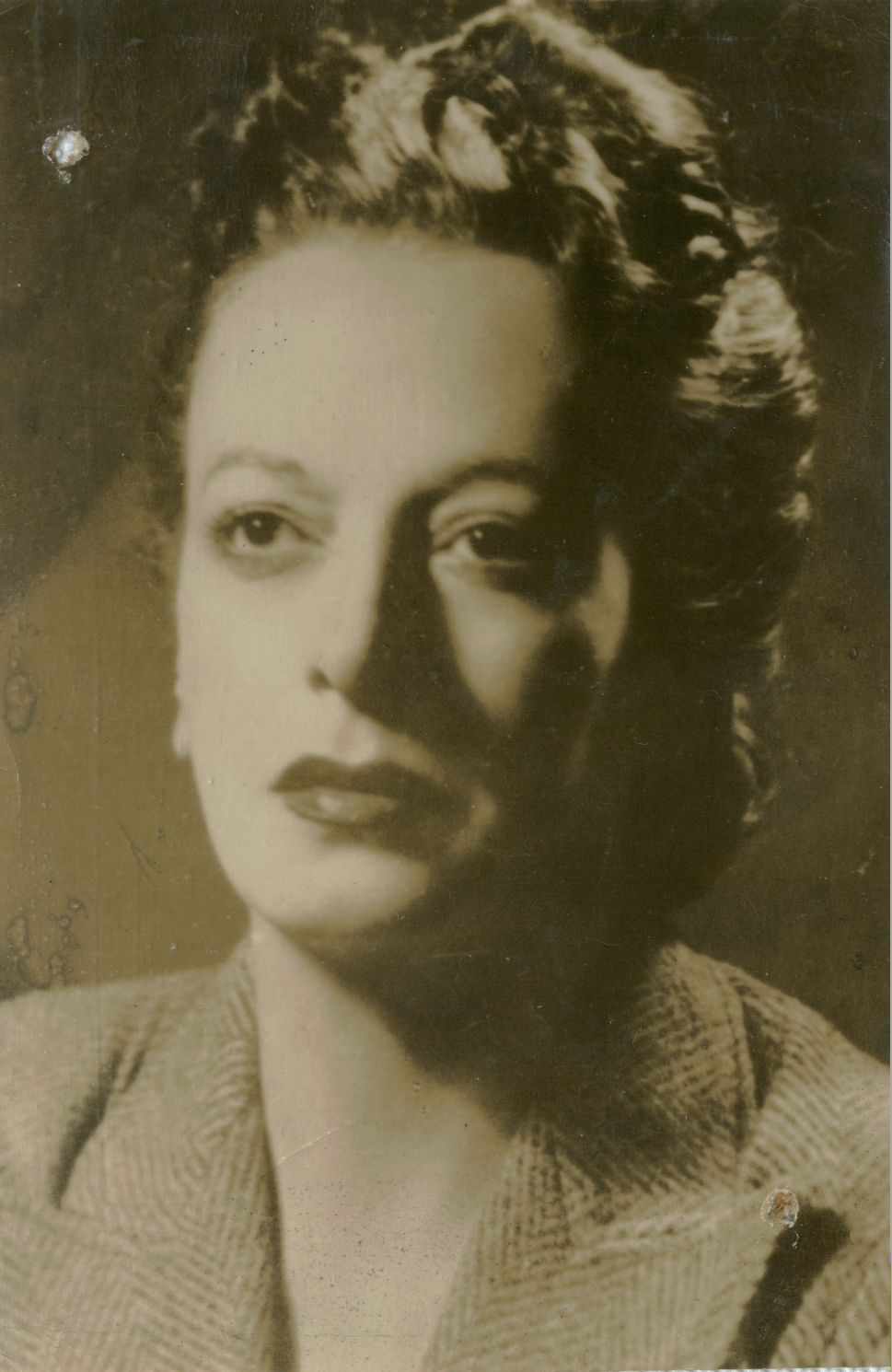
- O'Connor in 1940
- Born: 30 September 1905; Buenos Aires, Argentina
- Died: 7 April 1947 (aged 41); Montevideo, Uruguay
- Other name: Elsa Asunción Celestino
- Occupation: Actress
- Years active: 1935-1947 (film and stage)

Elsa O'Connor (1905–1947) was an Argentine stage and film actress, notable for her work during the Golden Age of Argentine cinema.

== Life and career ==
The daughter of actress and journalist Amelia Monti, who introduced her to the stage, she debuted with the Blanca Podestá company in 1923. O`Connor was awarded the prize to the best dramatic actress for her role in Himeneo and Celos. Her most successful role in theatre was in 1944 as Bella in the play Luz de Gas, by Narciso Ibáñez Menta, an adaptation of Patrick Hamilton's Gas Light.

In cinema, O'Connor also won the award of the Argentine Film Critics Association to the best support actress for the 1944 film The Desire.

Elsa O'Connor died in Montevideo from a traumatic brain injury on 7 April 1947, several days after falling down a staircase while acting in the play La Gata.

She was the mother of actor Horacio O'Connor (1928-1997) and the grandmother of tenor Martín O'Connor.

== Selected filmography ==
- The Life of Carlos Gardel (1939)
- Sensational Kidnapping (1942)
- Seven Women (1944)
- The Desire (1944)
- The Abyss Opens (1945)

== Bibliography ==
- Finkielman, Jorge. The Film Industry in Argentina: An Illustrated Cultural History. McFarland, 24 Dec 2003.
