= Elena Bozán =

Elena Bozán

Elena Bozán (9 November 1916, Buenos Aires- 1963, Buenos Aires, Argentina), was an Argentine actress, dancer and vedette. She was the sister of the actresses Sofia Bozan and Haydée Bozán, and the cousin of Olinda Bozán.

== Filmography ==
- 1928: La borrachera del tango
- 1931: Las luces de Buenos Aires
- 1936: El conventillo de la Paloma
- 1938: La estancia del gaucho Cruz
