= Miguel Gómez Bao =

Spanish-born Argentine actor (1894–1961)

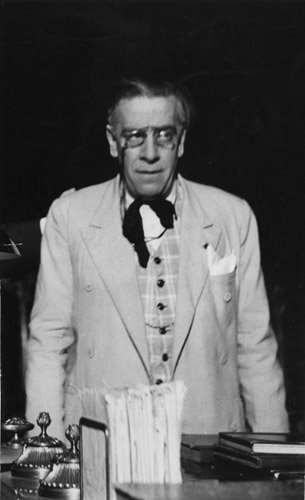
Miguel Gómez Bao

Miguel Gómez Bao (1894 – 17 September 1961) was a Spanish-born Argentine actor, notable for his work during the Golden Age of Argentine cinema. He was born in Malaga, Spain. He appeared in films, such as Amalia, (1936), Safo, historia de una pasión (1943) and La pequeña señora de Pérez (1944). He also did much work for radio and appeared on Radio El Mundo in the late 1930s.He was an actor and writer, known for Cuatro corazones (1939), Calles de Buenos Aires (1934) and Tararira (1936). He died in 1961 in Argentina.

== Selected filmography ==
- Corazón ante la ley (1929)
- La barra de Taponazo (1932)
- Rapsodia gaucha (1932)
- Streets of Buenos Aires (1934)
- Mañana es domingo (1934) – Peringo
- El alma del bandoneón (1935)
- Puente Alsina (1935)
- Puerto nuevo (1936)
- Loco lindo (1936) – Transpunte
- Amalia (1936)
- Tararira (la bohemia de hoy) (1936)
- ¡Goal! (1936)
- El pobre Pérez (1937)
- Muchachos de la ciudad (1937) – Tomado
- La casa de Quirós (1937)
- Maestro Levita (1938) – Dr.Ferran
- El canillita y la dama (1939)
- Kilómetro 111 (1938)
- Honeysuckle (1938) – Miguel Salvatierra
- The Life of Carlos Gardel (1939) – Garabito
- 24 horas en libertad (1939)
- Una mujer de la calle (1939)
- Caminito de gloria (1939)
- Pinocchio (1940, voice in Spanish dubbed version)
- Confesión (1940)
- Napoleón (1941)
- Canción de cuna (1941)
- La casa de los cuervos (1941)
- En el último piso (1942)
- La mentirosa (1942) – Mariano Zabaleta
- Los chicos crecen (1942)
- Claro de luna (1942)
- Casi un sueño (1943)
- Bambi (1943, voice in Spanish dubbed version)
- Safo, historia de una pasión (1943) – Silvino
- Punto negro (1943)
- La pequeña señora de Pérez (1944) – César Ayala
- Se rematan ilusiones (1944)
- Swan Song (1945) – Mendoza
- La señora de Pérez se divorcia (1945)
- El tercer huésped (1946)
- Con el diablo en el cuerpo (1947)
- 30 segundos de amor (1947)
- Una atrevida aventurita (1948)
- Novio, marido y amante (1948)
- La locura de don Juan (1948)
- Un pecado por mes (1949)
- Un hombre solo no vale nada (1949)
- Madre Alegría (1950)
- La doctora Castañuelas (1950)
- Fangio, el demonio de las pistas (1950)
- La mujer del león (1951) – (final film role)
