= Crazy Dandy =

- Directed by: Arturo S. Mom
- Written by: José B. Cairola; Conrado Nalé Roxlo
- Starring: Luis Sandrini
- Cinematography: John Alton
- Edited by: Daniel Spósito
- Music by: Enrique Casella; Carlos Di Sarli; Ernesto Fama; Alberto Gambino; José Vázquez Vigo
- Distributed by: Argentina Sono Film
- Release date: 13 July 1936
- Running time: 86 minutes
- Country: Argentina
- Language: Spanish

Crazy Dandy (Spanish: Loco lindo) is a 1936 Argentine comedy film of the Golden Age of Argentine cinema directed by Arturo S. Mom and written by José B. Cairola and Conrado Nalé Roxlo. Starring Luis Sandrini and Sofía Bozán, the film premiered in Buenos Aires on 13 July 1936. Carlos Rinaldi worked as a laboratory assistant on the film.

== Main cast ==
Luis Sandrini and Sofía Bozán

- Luis Sandrini as Miguelito Andrade
- Sofía Bozán as Negra
- Tomás Simari as Don Florencio
- Antonio Capuano
- Ricardo de Rosas
- Ernesto Fama as Cantor
- Pedro Fiorito as Peralta
- Fausto Fornoni
- Francisco García Garaba
- Alfredo Gobbi
- Miguel Gómez Bao as Transpunte
- Anita Jordán as Carmencita
- Miguel Mileo
- Raimundo Pastore as Braulio
- Rosa Rosen as Muchacha en almacén
- Juan Sarcione as Ponciano
- Susana Vargas

=== Gallery of stills ===
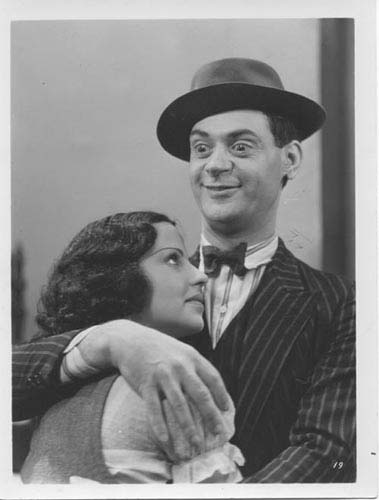
