= Bozan, Iran =

Bozan بزان
- Village
- Location within Iran
- Coordinates: 35°18′32″N 46°41′37″E
- Country: Iran
- Province: Kurdistan
- County: Sanandaj
- Bakhsh: Kalatrazan
- Rural District: Zhavarud-e Gharbi

Population (2006)
  - Total: 162
- Time zone: UTC+3:30 (IRST)
  - Summer (DST): UTC+4:30 (IRDT)

Bozan (Persian: بزان, also Romanized as Bozān) is a village in Zhavarud-e Gharbi Rural District, Kalatrazan District, Sanandaj County, Kurdistan Province, Iran. At the 2006 census, its population was 162, in 39 families. The village is populated by Kurds.
