= Roberto Airaldi =

Argentine actor

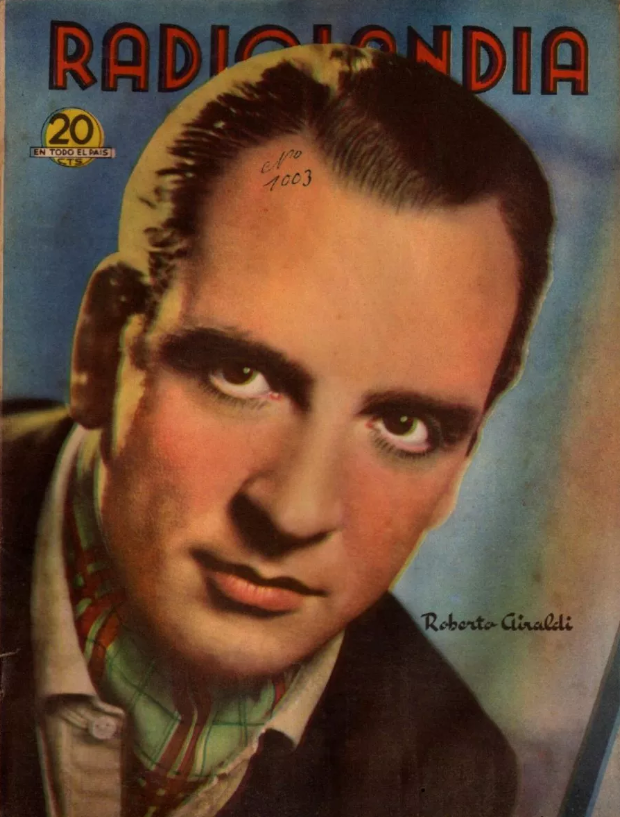
Roberto Airaldi, presented by Radiolandia, 1947

José Agustín "Roberto" Airaldi (4 October 1902 – 8 December 1977) was an Argentine actor.

== Selected filmography ==
- The Desire (1944)
