= The Dance of Fortune =

- Directed by: Luis Bayón Herrera
- Written by: Luis Bayón Herrera, Lucy Blanco, Leopoldo Torres Ríos
- Music by: Alberto Soifer
- Release date: 1944
- Country: Argentina
- Language: Spanish

The Dance of Fortune (Spanish: La Danza de la fortuna) is a 1944 Argentine musical comedy film of the classical era of Argentine cinema, directed by Luis Bayón Herrera and starring Luis Sandrini, Olinda Bozán and Héctor Quintanilla.

== Cast ==
- Luis Sandrini
- Olinda Bozán
- Héctor Quintanilla
- Ana Gryn
- Lolita Torres
- Luisa de García León
