= Enrique Amorim =

Uruguayan writer

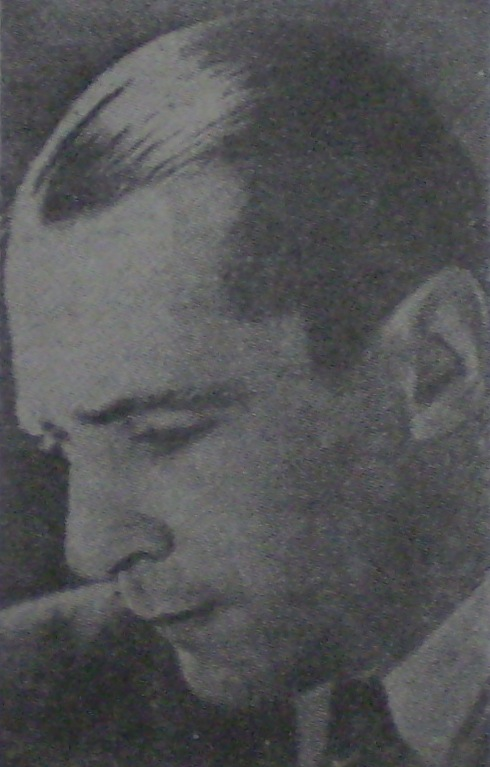
- Born: 25 July 1900; Salto, Uruguay
- Died: 28 July 1960 (aged 60); Salto, Uruguay
- Occupation(s): novelist, writer

Enrique Amorim (July 25, 1900 – July 28, 1960) was an Uruguayan novelist and writer, best known for his story Las quitanderas whose plot centers on rural prostitution; also known for his left-wing politics.

== Biography ==
Enrique Amorim was born in Salto, Uruguay to parents who were wealthy cattle ranchers. His father was from a Portuguese background, his mother Basque. Amorim travelled extensively in Europe and Latin America, developing acquaintanceships and friendships with many of the leading literary figures of his time. He eventually had a house built in Salto, designed by Le Corbusier.

In the 1920s Amorim wrote for the Argentine leftist magazine Los Pensadores and published with the press Claridad, both associated with the left-leaning Buenos Aires-based Boedo group. In 1947 Amorim officially joined the Communist Party of Uruguay. He was also responsible for the erection of a monument in Salto to commemorate Federico García Lorca, the poet and playwright killed by Francisco Franco's forces in the opening weeks of the Spanish Civil War.

He is mentioned in Borges' story "Tlön, Uqbar, Orbis Tertius".

== Works ==
=== Novels ===
- La carreta (1929)
- El paisano Aguilar (1934)
- La edad despareja (1938)
- El caballo y su sombra (1941) (English translation The Horse and His Shadow (Scribner 1943))
- La luna se hizo con agua (1944)
- El asesino desvelado (1946)
- Feria de farsantes (1952)
- Eva Burgos (1960)

=== Books of short stories ===
- Amorim (1923)
- Horizontes y bocacalles (1926)
- Tráfico (1927)
- La trampa del pajonal (1928)
- Del 1 al 6 (1932)
- La plaza de las carretas (1937)
- Después del temporal (1953)

=== Books of poems ===
- Veinte años (1920)
- Visitas al cielo (1929)
- Poemas uruguayos (1935)
- Dos poemas (1940)
- Primero de Mayo (1949)
- Quiero (1954)
- Sonetos de amor en verano (1958)

=== Plays ===
- La segunda sangre (1950)
- Don Juan 38 (1958)
