= Gogó Andreu =

Argentine actor, comedian and musician

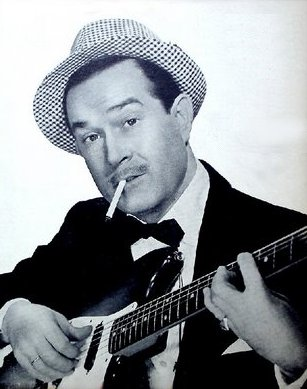
- Gogó Andreu in 1962
- Born: Ricardo César Andreu; July 27, 1919; Buenos Aires, Argentina
- Died: May 1, 2012 (aged 92); Buenos Aires, Argentina
- Occupations: actor, comedian, musician and composer
- Spouse: Rosita Gamas
- Parent(s): Antonio Andreu; Isabel Anchart
- Family: Mónica Andreu (daughter); César Andreu (son)

Ricardo César Andreu (July 27, 1919 – May 1, 2012) was an Argentine actor, comedian and musician.

== Biography ==
He was born into a family of actors. His parents were Antonio Andreu and Isabel Anchart, who were owners of an itinerary theatre company that made tours through the Argentine provinces. His eldest brother was the comedian Tono Andreu. When he was 12 years old the tango singer José Razzano, brought him to the Broadway theatre where he met Carlos Gardel.

== Selected filmography ==
- La guerra la gano yo (1943)
- Lucrezia Borgia (1947)
- Rhythm, Salt and Pepper (1951)
- The Squeezing Hand (1953)
- The Phantom of the Operetta (1955)
