= From the Hills to the Valley =

De la sierra al valle From the Hills to the Valley
- Release date: 1938
- Country: Argentina
- Language: Spanish

From the Hills to the Valley (Spanish: De la sierra al valle) is a 1938 Argentine drama film directed by Antonio Ber Ciani during the Golden Age of Argentine cinema. The film premiered in Buenos Aires.

== Cast ==
- León Zárate
- Alberto Gómez
- Aída Luz
- Milagros de la Vega
- Carlos Perelli
- Juan Siches de Alarcón
