= Aída Alberti =

Argentine actress

- Born: 13 November 1915; Buenos Aires, Argentina
- Died: 18 April 2006 (aged 90)

Aída Alberti (13 November 1915 – 18 April 2006) was an Argentine film actress of the Golden Age of Argentine cinema.

She entered film in 1938 in Pampa y cielo, followed by Atorrante in 1939. In 1946, she appeared in Albergue de mujeres with Orestes Caviglia.

== Filmography ==
- Pampa y cielo (1938)
- Atorrante (1939)
- Doce mujeres (1939)
- Una mujer de la calle (1939)
- Sinvergüenza (1940)
- La casa del recuerdo (1940)
- Dama de compañía (1940)
- Los ojazos de mi negra (1940)
- The Song of the Suburbs (La canción de los barrios) (1941)
- The Gaucho Priest (El cura gaucho) (1941)
- ¡Gaucho! (1942)
- La novia de los forasteros (1942)
- La luna en el pozo (1942)
- Fuego en la montaña (1943)
- Los dos rivales (1944)
- Llegó la niña Ramona (1945)
- Cuando en el cielo pasen lista (1945)
- Rosa de América (1946)
- Women's Refuge (Albergue de mujeres) (1946)
- La cumparsita (1947)
- Modern Husbands (Maridos modernos) (1948)
- Esperanza (1949)
- Llévame contigo (1951)
- Tierra extraña (1951)
- Mujeres en sombra (1951)
- Emergency Ward (Sala de guardia) (1952)
