= Los Celos de Cándida =

- Directed by: Luis Bayon Herrera
- Written by: Luis Bayon Herrera; Hernan de Castro and Nini Marshall
- Starring: Nini Marshall
- Cinematography: Roque Funes
- Edited by: Jose Cardella
- Music by: Alberto Soifer
- Release date: 5 June 1940
- Running time: 93 minutes
- Country: Argentina
- Language: Spanish

Los Celos de Cándida is a 1940 Argentine comedy film of the Golden Age of Argentine cinema, directed by Luis Bayón Herrera and starring Niní Marshall as her widely popular character Cándida.

== Cast ==
- Nini Marshall
- Augusto Codecá
- Hector Quintanilla
- Aída Luz
- Morena Chiolo
- Adrían Cuneo
- Elsa Marval
- Armando Durán
- Vicky Astory
- Lea Briand
- Berta Aliana
- Jorge Luz
