= Alejandro Gutiérrez del Barrio =

Alejandro Gutiérrez del Barrio (February 2, 1895 – September 15, 1954) was a Spanish born musician and score composer who worked in the Cinema of Argentina between 1936 and his death in 1954. A professional score composer hired by the film industry he composed the soundtracks to some 75 films and also a number of his earlier compositions were used in films some 6 years after his death. He composed the music to films such as Almafuerte in 1949.

== Selected filmography ==
- Santos Vega (1936)
- Our Land of Peace (1939)
- A Thief Has Arrived (1940)
- Mother Gloria (1941)
- When the Heart Sings (1941)
- The House of the Millions (1942)
- Story of a Poor Young Man (1942)
- The Prodigal Woman (1945)
- María Rosa (1946)
- The Sin of Julia (1946)
- The Three Rats (1946)
- An Ideal Husband (1947)
- Musical Romance (1947)
- Lucrezia Borgia (1947)
- Juan Moreira (1948)
- My Poor Beloved Mother (1948)
- The Unwanted (1951)
- The Tunnel (1952)
