= The Two Rivals (1944 film) =

- Directed by: Luis Bayón Herrera
- Release date: 1944
- Country: Argentina
- Language: Spanish

The Two Rivals (Spanish: Los Dos rivales) is a 1944 film of the classical era of Argentine cinema.
