= César Fiaschi =

Argentine actor (1891–1954)

- Born: 1891; Argentina
- Died: 1954 (aged 62–63); Buenos Aires, Argentina
- Occupation: Actor
- Years active: 1930-1954

César Fiaschi (1891–1954) was an Argentine film actor.

== Selected filmography ==
- Twelve Women (1939)
- My Country's Wings (1939)
- Seven Women (1944)
- His Best Student (1944)
- Saint Candida (1945)
- The Three Musketeers (1946)
- The Guitar of Gardel (1949)
- The Black Market (1953)

== Bibliography ==
- Finkielman, Jorge. The Film Industry in Argentina: An Illustrated Cultural History. McFarland, 24 Dec 2003.
