= Luis Bayón Herrera =

Spanish film director and screenwriter

- Born: 23 September 1889; Madrid, Spain
- Died: 30 March 1956 (aged 66)
- Occupations: Director, Screenwriter
- Years active: 1938–1951

Luis Bayón Herrera (23 September 1889 – 30 March 1956) was a Spanish film director and screenwriter who worked in Argentine film of the 1940s and 1950s. He was "one of the most important directors of the Golden Age of Argentine cinema".

Herrera was born in Bilbao, Spain. He directed some 40 different Argentine feature films and in the last few years of his career in the early 1950s he worked on Cuban production with films such as A La Habana me voy in 1951.

He died in Buenos Aires in 1956, aged 66.

== Biography ==
His professional and artistic career took place almost entirely in Argentina in the 1940s and 1950s, where he Mise-en-scène forty different films. He is considered to be “one of the most important directors of the golden age of Cinema of Argentina.” In the final years of his career, in the early 1950s, he appeared in several films produced in Cuba, such as A La Habana me voy in 1951. His final work was Una cubana en España, also from 1951, starring Marujita Díaz and Blanquita Amaro in the leading roles.

== Filmography ==
- Buenos Aires Nights (1935)
- The Favorite (1935)
- Jettatore (1938)
- Mi suegra es una fiera (1939)
- Entre el barro (1939)
- Cándida (1939)
- Amor (1940)
- The Tango Star (1940)
- Los celos de Cándida (1940)
- Mi fortuna por un nieto (1940)
- El más infeliz del pueblo (1941)
- Joven, viuda y estanciera (1941)
- Cándida millonaria (1941)
- Peluquería de señoras (1941)
- Story of a Poor Young Man (1942)
- Sensational Kidnapping (1942)
- The House of the Millions (1942)
- La suerte llama tres veces (1943)
- Pasión imposible (1943)
- La piel de zapa (1943)
- Los dos rivales (1944)
- The Dance of Fortune (1944)
- A Woman of No Importance (1945)
- La amada inmóvil (1945)
- Un modelo de París (1946)
- No salgas esta noche (1946)
- Tres millones... y el amor (1946)
- An Ideal Husband (1947)
- Lucrezia Borgia (1947)
- Cuidado con las imitaciones (1948)
- Modern Husbands (1948)
- Fúlmine (1949)
- Todo un héroe (1949)
- El seductor (1950)
- Buenos Aires a la vista (1950)
- A La Habana me voy (1951)
- Con la música en el alma (1951)
- A Cuban in Spain (1951)
