= Sofía Bozán =

Argentine actress (1904–1958)

- Born: 5 November 1904; Buenos Aires, Argentina
- Died: 9 July 1958 (aged 53); Buenos Aires, Argentina
- Years active: 1931–54

Sofía Bozán (5 November 1904 – 9 July 1958) was an Argentine film actress and tango performer of the 1930s and 1940s, and one of the most popular figures of the Golden Age of Argentine cinema. She made almost 30 film appearances between 1937 and 1959.

She began her acting career in 1931 and appeared in films such as Puerto nuevo (1936), Loco lindo (1937) and Muchachas que estudian (1939).

She also appeared as herself in the tango film Arriba el telón o el patio de la morocha (1951) as herself.

She was the sister of Elena Bozán and Haydée Bozán. Bozán died of cancer in 1958 at the age of 53.

== Filmography ==
- La Calle del pecado (1954)
- Campeón à la fuerza (1950)
- Rodríguez, supernumerario (1948)
- Elvira Fernández, vendedora de tiendas (1942)
- Isabelita (1940) .... Elena
- Carnaval de antaño (1940)
- Los Muchachos se divierten (1940)
- Muchachas que estudian (1939) .... Luisa
- Loco lindo (1937)
- Puerto nuevo (1936)
- Goal (1936)
- The Lights of Buenos Aires (1931) .... Elvira del Solar
