= List of Argentine films of 1966 =

A list of films produced in Argentina in 1966:

Argentine films of 1966
Title	Director	Release	Genre
A - C
Alma gallega	Amando Hermida Luaces	22 September	
Los anónimos	Pedro Stocki	26 August	
La buena vida	René Mugica	9 June	
Buenos días, Buenos Aires	Fernando Birri	26 August	
Buenos Aires	David José Kohon	26 August	
Buenos Aires en camiseta	Martín Schor	26 August	
Castigo al traidor	Manuel Antín	26 May	
¡Cómo te extraño...!	Enrique Cahen Salaberry	10 March	
La cómplice	René Cardona	26 April	
Con el más puro amor	Jorge Cromberg	11 October	
D - H
Del brazo con la muerte	Carlos Lao	8 September	
Del brazo y por la calle	Enrique Carreras	4 August	
De profesión, sospechosos	Enrique Carreras	5 May	Comedy
Días calientes	Armando Bó	10 May	drama
Dos en el mundo	Solly Schroeder	30 March	
Dos quijotes sobre ruedas	Emilio Vieyra	16 June	
Escala musical	Leo Fleider	21 July	musical
El Galleguito de la cara sucia	Enrique Cahen Salaberry	10 November	
La gorda	Rubén W. Cavallotti	14 April	
Hotel alojamiento	Fernando Ayala	31 March	
I - P
Las locas del conventillo (María y la otra)	Fernando Ayala		
Máscaras en otoño	Dino Minitti		
Mi primera novia	Enrique Carreras	17 March	
Muchachos impacientes	Julio Saraceni	28 July	
Necesito una madre	Fernando Siro	2 June	
El ojo que espía	Leopoldo Torre Nilsson	1 September	
Pampa salvaje	Hugo Fregonese	7 July	
Pimienta	Carlos Rinaldi	19 May	
La primera fundación de Buenos Aires	Fernando Birri	26 August	
Q - Z
Ritmo, amor y juventud	Enrique de Rosas (h)	27 October	
La tentación desnuda	Armando Bó	3 November	
Todo sol es amargo	Alfredo Mathé	28 September	
Una máscara para Ana	Rubén W. Cavallotti	15 December	
Una ventana al éxito	Enrique de Rosas (h)	28 September	
Vacaciones en la Argentina	Guido Leoni	16 December	
Villa Delicia, playa de estacionamiento, música ambiental	Román Viñoly Barreto	30 June	
Vivir es formidable	Leo Fleider	12 January	
Voy a hablar de la esperanza	Carlos Borcosque	1 July	

== External links and references ==
- Argentine films of 1966 at the Internet Movie Database
