= Ritmo nuevo y vieja ola =

1965 Argentine film

- Directed by: Enrique Carreras
- Written by: Julio Porter
- Produced by: Nicolás Carreras
- Starring: Lolita Torres; Roberto Airaldi; Dean Reed
- Cinematography: Antonio Merayo
- Edited by: Jorge Gárate
- Music by: Tito Ribero
- Distributed by: General Belgrano
- Release date: 1965
- Running time: 113 minutes
- Country: Argentina
- Language: Spanish

Ritmo nuevo y vieja ola is a 1965 Argentine film directed by Enrique Carreras. It was written by Julio Porter. It premiered on 19 August 1965.

== Plot ==
The film is divided in three parts: New wave (Vieja Ola), Eternal wave (Ola eterna) and Old wave (Nueva Ola).

== Cast ==
- Roberto Airaldi as Pena
- Toño Andreu
- Guillermo Battaglia
- Augusto Bonardo
- Héctor Calcaño
- Osvaldo Canónico
- Chispita Carreras
- Marisita Carreras as Marisita
- Mercedes Carreras as Delia
- Quique Carreras
- José Comellas
- Guido Gorgatti
- Santiago Gómez Cou
- Ángel Magaña
- Antonio Martiáñez
- Ubaldo Martínez
- Tita Merello
- Estela Molly
- Elvira Olivera Garcés
- Alberto Olmedo
- Rodolfo Onetto
- Fidel Pintos
- Javier Portales
- Pedro Quartucci
- Dean Reed as himself
- Susana Rubio
- Jorge Salcedo as Gustavo de Castro
- Ignacio de Soroa
- Norberto Suárez
- Lolita Torres as Raquel Mejía
- Tristán Díaz Ocampo
- Darío Vittori

== Reception ==
King in El Mundo wrote, "The show is, in general terms, brilliant".

El Cronista Comercial reviewed the film, writing the following about the close: "At the end in a quite objectionable scene, Tita Merello sings a tango and the film ends with a photograph of Gardel, there are many spectators who applaud".

Un diccionario de films argentinos summarized it as: "In the same style as Esto es Alegria, a comedy sketch, a romance sketch and a melancholic third. Cast full of names and libretto lacking in ideas".
