= Cuidado con las colas =

1964 film

- Directed by: Julio Saraceni
- Written by: Abel Santa Cruz
- Cinematography: Humberto Peruzzi
- Edited by: Jorge Gárate and Higinio Vecchione
- Music by: Tito Ribero
- Release date: 12 November 1964
- Running time: 85 minutes
- Country: Argentina
- Language: Spanish

Cuidado con las colas is a 1964 Argentine film directed by Julio Saraceni and starring Juan Carlos Thorry and Ambar La Fox.

== Cast ==
- Juan Carlos Thorry
- Ambar La Fox
- Beba Bidart
- Enrique Serrano
- Julia Sandoval
- Fernando Siro
- Beatriz Taibo
- Vicente Rubino
- Paulette Christian
- Lalo Hartich
- Joe Rígoli
- María Armand
- Zulema Esperanza
- Zulma Grey
- Ricardo Quinteros
- Lucio Deval
- Ricardo Jordán
- Osvaldo Castro
