= List of Argentine films of 1965 =

A list of films produced in Argentina in 1965:

Argentine films of 1965
Title	Director	Release	Genre
A – E
Ahorro y préstamo para el amor	Leo Fleider	1 December	
Bicho raro	Carlos Rinaldi	1 June	
Canuto Cañete, detective privado	Leo Fleider	1 July	
Con gusto a rabia	Fernando Ayala	5 May	
Convención de vagabundos	Rubén W. Cavallotti	10 June	
Cosquín, amor y folklore	Delfor María Beccaglia	30 September	
Crónica de un niño solo	Leonardo Favio	5 May	
Disloque en el presidio	Julio Saraceni	29 April	Comedy
Esquiú, una luz en el sendero	Ralph Pappier	24 June	
Esta noche mejor no	Julio Saraceni	19 February	
F – N
Fiebre de primavera	Enrique Carreras	18 March	
Fuego en la sangre	René Cardona	11 March	
Los guerrilleros	Lucas Demare	5 August	
La Industria del matrimonio	Enrique Carreras, Luis Saslavsky and Fernando Ayala	1 September	
Los hipócritas	Enrique Carreras	20 May	
Intimidad de los parques	Manuel Antín	27 July	
La mujer del zapatero	Armando Bo	27 May	drama
Nacidos para cantar	Emilio Gómez Muriel	5 May	
Nadie oyó gritar a Cecilio Fuentes	Fernando Siro	19 August	drama
O – Z
Orden de matar	Román Viñoly Barreto	23 September	
Pajarito Gómez -una vida feliz-	Rodolfo Kuhn	5 August	
La pérgola de las flores	Román Viñoly Barreto	9 September	
El perseguidor	Osías Wilenski	10 March	
Psique y sexo	Manuel Antín, Dino Minitti, Ernesto Bianco and Enrique Cahen Salaberry	14 September	
El reñidero	René Mugica	13 May	
Ritmo nuevo, vieja ola	Enrique Carreras	19 August	musical
Santiago querido!	Catrano Catrani and Virgilio Muguerza	15 April	
Un italiano en la Argentina	Dino Risi	25 March	
Un lugar al sol	Dino Minitti	3 June	
Viaje de una noche de verano	Rubén W. Cavallotti, Rodolfo Kuhn, José A. Martínez Suárez, René Mugica, Carlos Rinaldi and Fernando Ayala	10 June	

== External links and references ==
- Argentine films of 1965 at the Internet Movie Database
