= List of Argentine films of 1963 =

A list of films produced in Argentina in 1963:

Argentine films of 1963
Title	Director	Release	Genre
A - C
Alias Flequillo	Julio Saraceni	11 September	
Argentina tierra pródiga	Edgardo Togni	28 March	
Las aventuras del Capitán Piluso (En el castillo del terror)	Francis Lauric	19 December	
Barcos de papel	Román Viñoly Barreto	28 February	
La calesita	Hugo del Carril	31 October	
Canuto Cañete, conscripto del siete	Leo Fleider	7 November	
La chacota	Enrique Dawi	17 October	
La cigarra no es un bicho	Daniel Tinayre	6 May	
Cuando calienta el sol	Julio Saraceni	2 May	
Cuarenta años de novios	Enrique Carreras	3 October	
D - N
La familia Falcón	Román Viñoly Barreto	2 May	
La fusilación	Catrano Catrani	25 December	
Los inconstantes	Rodolfo Kuhn	12 September	
Los inocentes	Juan Antonio Bardem	26 September	
La fin del mundo	Emilio Vieyra	26 June	
Lindor Covas, el cimarrón	Carlos Cores	24 April	
Los que verán a Dios	Rodolfo Blasco	28 February	
Las modelos	Vlasta Lah	17 October	
La murga	René Mugica	1 August	
El noveno mandamiento	Enrique Carreras	23 August	
O - Z
Paula cautiva	Fernando Ayala	25 September	
Pelota de cuero (Historia de una pasión)	Armando Bó	25 July	
Pesadilla	Diego Santillán	26 September	
Rata de puerto	René Mugica	27 August	
Las ratas	Luis Saslavsky	22 August	
El sexto sentido	Enrique Carreras	18 July	
La terraza	Leopoldo Torre Nilsson	17 October	
Testigo para un crimen	Emilio Vieyra	18 September	
El turista	Enrique Cahen Salaberry	5 April	

== External links and references ==
- Argentine films of 1963 at the Internet Movie Database
- Manrupe, Raúl; Portela, María Alejandra (2001). Un diccionario de films argentinos (1930-1995) (in Spanish). Buenos Aires: Editorial Corregidor. ISBN 950-05-0896-6.
