= List of Argentine films of 1970 =

A list of films produced in Argentina in 1970:

Argentine films of 1970
Title	Director	Release	Genre
A - F
Amalio Reyes, un hombre	Enrique Carreras	16 April	Drama
Blum	Julio Porter	23 July	Drama
Con alma y vida	David José Kohon	1 October	Drama
La Cosecha	Marcos Madanes	28 October	Drama
El despertar del sexo	Jorge Darnell	22 June	Drama
Este loco verano	Fred Carneano	3 September	Comedia
El extraño del pelo largo	Julio Porter	5 March	Comedia
La fidelidad	Juan José Jusid	24 September	Drama
G - J
Gitano	Emilio Vieyra	4 June	Drama
La guita	Fernando Ayala	7 May	
Los herederos	David Stivel	18 June	Drama
El hombre del año	Kurt Land	19 November	
El hombre del ovni	Aníbal Guerrero	28 November	sci-fi TV movie
Joven viuda y estanciera	Julio Saraceni	24 September	Comedia
Juan Lamaglia y Sra.	Raúl de la Torre	28 April	Drama
K - P
Moamba (Vidas vendidas)	Maximo Giuseppe Alviani		Drama
Los mochileros	Emilio Vieyra	2 July	Drama
Mosaico	Néstor Paternostro	19 November	Drama
Muchacho	Leo Fleider	6 August	
Los Muchachos de mi barrio	Enrique Carreras	12 March	
El Mundo es de los jóvenes	Julio Porter	24 September	
Pimienta y Pimentón	Carlos Rinaldi	24 April	
El Profesor patagónico	Fernando Ayala	3 September	Comedia
R - Z
Radiografías	Marcos Madanes	28 October	
El Santo de la espada	Leopoldo Torre Nilsson	25 March	History
El sátiro	Kurt Land	10 September	
Una cabaña en la Pampa	Ángel Cárdenas	14 October	
Un elefante color de ilusión	Derlis M. Beccaglia	7 July	
Un gaucho con plata	Ángel Acciaresi	26 February	

== External links and references ==
- Argentine films of 1970 at the Internet Movie Database
