= Ricardo Lavié =

Argentine actor

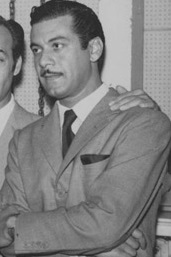
- Born: Ricardo Eloy Machado; October 5, 1923; Buenos Aires, Argentina
- Died: April 6, 2010 (aged 86); Buenos Aires, Argentina
- Occupation: Actor
- Spouse: Noemí Laserre
- Children: Estela Molly
- Parent: Juan Ignacio Machado
- Relatives: Rodolfo Machado (brother)

Ricardo Eloy Machado (October 5, 1923 – April 6, 2010) was an Argentine actor.

== Biography ==
Born in Buenos Aires, he acted in radio, movies, theater and TV. He died in Buenos Aires, Argentina, on April 6, 2010. He was married to actress Noemí Laserre and their daughter is the actress Estela Molly.

== Filmography ==
- La increíble historia de Asterión y Clotilda (2003) .... Asterión
- Pasaje al paraíso (2003) .... Ángel
- La clínica loca (1988)
- Mujer - Mujer (1987) ....
- Todo o nada (1984)
- La rabona (1979)
- La obertura (1977)
- La gran aventura (1974)
- Porcelandia (1974) Serie
- El picnic de los Campanelli (1972)
- Estoy hecho un demonio (1972)
- Pimienta y pimentón (1970)
- Pimienta (1966) .... Doctor Peña
- El mago de las finanzas (1962)
- Dos basuras (1958)
- Isla hechizada (1955)
- The Tunnel (1952)
- La comedia inmortal (1951)
- Captura recomendada (1950)
- Juan Globo (1949)

== Televisión ==
- Chiquititas (2 episodios, 1998–1999)
- - Episode #5.1 (1999) .... Joaquín Maza
- - Episode #4.1 (1998).... Don Michell
- Como pan caliente (1996) Serie .... Fermín
- Chiquilina mía (1991) Serie.... Padre Julián
- Brigada cola (1990) Serie
- El hombre que amo (1986) Serie .... Beto
- Momento de incertidumbre (1985) Serie (unknown episodes)
- Historia de un trepador (1984) Serie .... Bruno
- El Rafa (1981) Serie.... Pascual
- Andrea Celeste (1979) Serie.... Fernando (unknown episodes)
- Porcelandia (1974) Comic Program: Jorge Porcel, Diana Maggi, Beto Gianola, y Ricardo Lavié.
- El sátiro (1963) mini-serie
- Ellos dos y alguién más (1962)
- El último pecado (1962)
