= Esta noche mejor no =

- Directed by: Julio Saraceni
- Written by: Abel Santacruz
- Starring: Teresa Blasco; Roberto Escalada
- Cinematography: Humberto Peruzzi
- Edited by: Jorge Gárate
- Music by: Tito Ribero
- Release date: 1965
- Running time: 85 minutes
- Country: Argentina
- Language: Spanish

Esta noche mejor no is a 1965 Argentine comedy film directed by Julio Saraceni.

== Cast ==
- Teresa Blasco
- Roberto Escalada
- Fernando Siro
- Ubaldo Martínez
- Beba Bidart
- Nelly Panizza
- Lalo Hartich
