= Agustín Navarro =

Agustín Navarro may refer to:

- Agustín Navarro (director), Spanish film director
- Agustín Navarro (footballer), Uruguayan footballer
- Agustín Hernández Navarro, Mexican sculptor, poet, and architect
