= Canario rojo =

- Directed by: Julio Porter
- Written by: Julio Porter, Manfried Rössner
- Starring: Elder Barber, Alberto Dalbés, Héctor Calcaño
- Cinematography: Roque Giaccovino
- Edited by: Higinio Vecchione
- Music by: George Andreani
- Release date: 21 July 1955 (Argentina)
- Running time: 95 min
- Country: Argentina
- Language: Spanish

Canario rojo (English: The Red Canary) is a 1955 black-and-white Argentine film written and directed by Julio Porter. The film is based on the play Carlos III y Ana by Austria by Manfried Rössner. It premiered on July 21, 1955.

== Plot ==
After failing her exam, a young student accosts her professor.

== Cast ==
- Elder Barber
- Alberto Dalbés
- Héctor Calcaño
- Luis Dávila
- Morenita Galé
- Beatriz Bonnet
- Don Pelele
- Fernando Siro
- Amalia Bernabé
- Luis García Bosch
- Marcos Zucker
- Vassili Lambrinos
- Amalia Britos
- Víctor Martucci
- Pascual Nacarati
