= List of Argentine films of 1978 =

A list of films produced in Argentina in 1978:

Argentine films of 1978
Title	Director	Release	Genre
A - I
Allá lejos y hace tiempo	Manuel Antín	25 May	
Amigos para La Aventura	Palito Ortega	3 August	
Borges para millones	Ricardo Wullicher	14 September	
Comedia rota	Oscar Barney Finn	12 October	
Con mi mujer no puedo	Enrique Dawi	13 July	
El divorcio está de moda (de común acuerdo)	Fernando Siro	30 March	
Encuentros muy cercanos con señoras de cualquier tipo	Hugo Moser	14 September	Comedy
Éxtasis tropical	Armando Bó	19 October	drama
El Fantástico mundo de María Montiel	Jorge Zuhair Jury	9 March	
Fotógrafo de señoras	Hugo Moser	13 April	
Furia en la isla	Oscar Cabeillou	30 November	
Imágenes de la Argentina		21 June	Documentary
J - Z
La Mamá de la novia	Enrique Carreras	4 May	
Margarito Tereré	Waldo Belloso	27 July	
Los médicos	Fernando Ayala	23 March	
Mi mujer no es mi señora	Hugo Moser	29 June	Comedy
La parte del león	Adolfo Aristarain	5 October	
Patolandia nuclear	Julio Saraceni	15 June	
Proceso a la infamia	Alejandro Doria	2 March	
Los ratones	Francisco Vasallo	23 September	
Los superagentes y el tesoro maldito	Adrián Quiroga	3 August	
El Tío Disparate	Palito Ortega	23 February	
Yo también tengo fiaca	Enrique Cahen Salaberry	24 August	
Un Idilio de estación	Aníbal E. Uset	21 September	

== External links and references ==
- Argentine films of 1978 at the Internet Movie Database
