= Daughter of Dracula =

- French film poster
- Directed by: Jesús Franco
- Screenplay by: Jesús Franco
- Produced by: Robert de Nesle; Arturo Marcos Tejedor
- Starring: Britt Nichols; Anne Libert; Alberto Dalbés; Howard Vernon
- Cinematography: José Climent
- Production companies: Produções Cinematográficas; Comptoir Français du Film Production; Cooperativa Fénix Films
- Distributed by: Comptoir Français du Film Production (Paris)
- Release date: December 14, 1972 (France)
- Countries: Portugal; France; Spain

Daughter of Dracula (Note: Spanish: La Fille de Dracula, lit. 'Daughter of Dracula'; Portuguese: A filha de Drácula; French: La hija de Drácula) is a 1972 erotic horror film directed and written by Jesús Franco. The film is set in a modern-day coastal Spanish town, where the Karlstein family is cursed by Count Dracula who sleeps in a coffin in the basement of their home. Meanwhile, murders spring about town, leading to the local a local journalist named Charlie to investigate them, with his research leading him to the Karlstein home.

Daughter of Dracula was one of the several productions director Jesús Franco made in the early 1970s during a period of rapid filmmaking that had him complete six films in 1971, eight in 1972, and eleven in 1973. This film was made in early 1972 and predominantly shot in Spain and Portugal shortly after the completion of Dracula, Prisoner of Frankenstein (1972). Daughter of Dracula was a co-production between Portugal, France and Spain, and was only released theatrically in France of its three production countries.

Retrospective reviews from Franco biographer Stephen Thrower and Budd Wilkins of Slant Magazine found the film only had brief moments of the better qualities of Franco's films. Douglas Rednour of Library Journal alternatively wrote that the film would be a fine introduction to what he described as "the cheap, transgressive, and hypnotically delirious cinema" of Franco.

== Plot ==
In a town near the coast of modern-day Spain, A young woman is murdered at home by an unknown female presence. The Karlstein family gather at a chapel that was once the one-time home of Count Dracula. Countess Karlstein is seriously ill and gives her daughter, Luisa, a key to the basement of the chapel, telling her that she must go to find out why she is dying. Before she goes, the Countess perishes.

Police later find the body of an earlier female victim on a beach. Charlie, a journalist, takes an interest in the case and finds that locals claim the crime to be supernatural. Luisa later goes to explore the basement and finds Count Dracula emerging from one of the two coffins. Later, a shadowy visage terrorizes Luisa's cousin Karine in the Karlestein castle bedrooms. The next day, Karine discusses her childhood friendship with Luisa before having sex. A second murder victim, Miss Dorian, the dancer at a local nightclub, is then murdered with a cane, with witnesses descriptsion lead to the police to suspect Count Karlstein.

Charlie breaks into Karlstein's castle and finds the cane that matches the description of the witnesses. While Ana Kramer testifies that she was with Karlstein at the time or muder, having sex with him in a hotel. Jefferson, who is Karlstein's secretary and the husband of Ana, forgives his wife for sleeping with Karlstein and vows to put an end to the vampire curse on the home. He enters the crypt but hesitates when he finds Luisa and Count Draucla sleeping in their coffins. Charlie and Superintendent Ptuschko arrive, with Charlie putting a stake into Count Dracula's forehead while Ptuschko sets fire to Luisa's coffin.

== Cast ==
- Britt Nichols as Luisa Karlstein
- Anne Libert as Karine, Luisa's cousin
- Alberto Dalbés as Police Superintendent Ptuschko
- Daniel White as Count Max Karlstein
- Jesús Franco as Cyril Jefferson, Count Karlstein's secretary
- Howard Vernon as Dracula
- Yelena Samarina as Ana Kramer
- Eduarda Pimenta as the first victim
- Conchita Núñez as Margo, the café waitress

== Development ==
After making the sex comedy film Sexy Darlings (1971), director Jesús Franco would work on several films for the Paris-based producer Robert de Nesle, whose Comptoir Français du Film Production (CFFP) would produce or co-produce 23 of Franco's films for the next ten years. During this period, Franco's film production would accelerate, with the director completing six films in 1971, eight in 1972, and eleven in 1973. Following Vampyros Lesbos which was shot in 1970 and released in 1971, Franco would direct two more films with a lesbian vampire theme with Daughter of Dracula and Female Vampire (1975). Daughter of Dracula was an international co-production between Portugal, France and Spain. It was produced by the Lisbon-based Interfilme Produções Cinematográficas and with uncredited funding from the Paris-based Comptoir Français du Film Production and the Madrid-based Cooperativa Fénix Films.

Among the cast was Alberto Dalbés, who first worked with Franco in The Devil Came from Akasava (1971) and would regularly work with Franco for four years. Britt Nichols, also known as Carmen Yazalde, was a Lisbon-based actress whose brief film career included seven films made with Franco in a two-year period.

The film was shot after Franco had filmed Dracula, Prisoner of Frankenstein (1972) in early 1972. It was shot in Portugal at both Monserrate Palace and Palácio dos Condes de Castro Guimarães in Cascais. Other scenes were shot in Sintra in Portugal and Murcia in Spain. Anne Libert, who played Karine in the film and had acted in several Franco films, described working with Franco as being amazing. She said that in Portugal, there were no film unions, which led to shooting day and night, sometimes only finishing filming at 2 am in the morning.

While French prints credit René Sylviano as the film's composer, other sources credit Daniel White with additional music provided by Franco and Ezequiel Caldas.

== Release ==
Daughter of Dracula was distributed in Paris by Comptoir Français du Film Production as La Fille de Dracula (lit. 'Daughter of Dracula') and released in France on December 14, 1972. It was later shown in Brussels, Belgium as De dochter van Dracula (lit. 'Daughter of Dracula') on January 17, 1974. It was never released theatrically in Spain, and there is no record of a Portuguese release.

The film was released by Kino Lorber on blu-ray on October 4, 2016.

== Reception ==
From retrospective reviews, Budd Wilkins of Slant Magazine found Daughter of Dracula to be a "slapdash affair" saying it could not decide whether to be a remake of Franco's The Sadistic Baron von Klaus (1963) or to "wallow in the lesbian vampire " style of Vampyros Lesbos (1971). Wilkins said that while the most effective of Franco's films have an "absorbing dreamlike quality", Daughter of Dracula only had this in small portions. Stephen Thrower, author of Murderous Passions: The Delirious Cinema of Jesús Franco (2015) said that the film was "the weakest" of three gothic films Franco made during along with Dracula, Prisoner of Frankenstein (1972) and The Erotic Rites of Frankenstein (1973) saying it was somehow more conventional and less coherent than the other films with only "occasional glimpses of what might have been." Robert Firsching said that outside some well-handled murder scenes and surreal eroticism, Daughter of Dracula had "disorientingly cheerful photography" and a general "lack of genuine menace" which prevented the film from being effective.

Douglas Rednour of Library Journal said the film would be a fine introduction to what he described as "the cheap, transgressive, and hypnotically delirious cinema" of Franco, noting it featured Franco's usual "ridiculously slipshod scenes alongside sublime shots of decadent decay."

== See also ==
- Horror films of Europe
- List of horror films of 1972
