= Rodolfo Machado =

Argentine actor (1934–2020)

- Born: May 7, 1934
- Died: June 11, 2020 (aged 86)
- Occupation: Actor
- Parent: Juan Ignacio Machado
- Relatives: Ricardo Lavié (brother); Noemí Laserre (sister-in-law); Estela Molly (niece)

Rodolfo Machado (May 7, 1934 – June 11, 2020) was an Argentine actor.
