= Cuando calienta el sol =

Cuando calienta el sol may refer to:

- "Cuando calienta el sol" (song), 1961 Spanish song
  - Love Me with All Your Heart", English language song, with music based on above song
- Cuando calienta el sol (film), 1963 Argentine film
- Cuando calienta el Sol, a Spanish TV game show on Spanish Televisión Española station
- Cuando calienta el sol, 2000 film directed by René Cardona Jr.
- Cuando calienta el sol... vamos a la playa, 1983 Italian film directed by Mino Guerrini
- "Cuando calienta el sol", title of episode 1 of the 2017 TV series Luis Miguel for Netflix and Telemundo
