= Las modelos (film) =

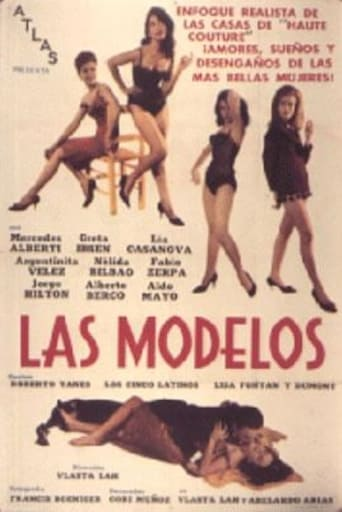
- Theatrical release poster.
- Directed by: Vlasta Lah
- Screenplay by: Vlasta Lah; Abelardo Arias
- Story by: Vlasta Lah
- Produced by: Víctor E. Catrani; Oscar Mario Guevara; Justo Martínez
- Starring: Mercedes Alberti; Greta Ibsen
- Cinematography: Francis Boeniger
- Edited by: Jacinto Cascales
- Music by: Lucio Milena
- Release date: 17 October 1963 (Buenos Aires)
- Running time: 85 minutes
- Country: Argentina
- Language: Spanish

Las modelos (Spanish for "the models") is a 1963 film directed and written by Vlasta Lah, the first woman director of sound films in Argentina and the only woman filmmaker in 1960s Latin America. It was her second and last film, released after her 1960 directorial debut Las furias. The film tells the story of Sonia and Ana, two young haute couture models, who are played by two real-life models instead of actresses.

== Cast ==
- Mercedes Alberti
- Greta Ibsen
- Fabio Zerpa
- Jorge Hilton
- Alberto Berco
- Aldo Mayo
- Nélida Bilbao
- Lia Casanova
- Argentinita Vélez
- Leda Zanda
- María Principito
- Víctor Martucci
- Guillermo Pérez Gaviola
- Guillermo Gatti
- Guillermo Cuba

== Critical reception ==
Unlike Las furias, which was poorly received by critics, Las modelos received mostly positive reviews. Radiolandia magazine declared that the theme of the film was of "appreciable depth", celebrating that its the struggle of young women who earn a living on their own in big cities. The review of newspaper Crítica read: "In the manner of a short novel, haute couture in a modest approach." In a less enthusiastic review, La Nación equated the film to a television play and described it as an "elementary story loaded with ingenuity and conventionalism".

Writing in 2001, Raúl Manrupe and María Alejandra Portela described the film as a "boring point of view that wants to function as social criticism." In a 2022 poll of The 100 Greatest Films of Argentine Cinema—organized by magazines La vida útil, Taipei and La tierra quema, presented at the Mar del Plata International Film Festival—Las modelos reached the joint 62nd spot, meaning it received one vote. It was voted by filmmaker Lorena Jozami, who described it as a "novel film ahead of its time with strong female characters that defy the androcentric trend of cinema to this day."

== See also ==
- List of Argentine films of 1963
