= Guido Gorgatti =

Argentine actor (1919–2023)

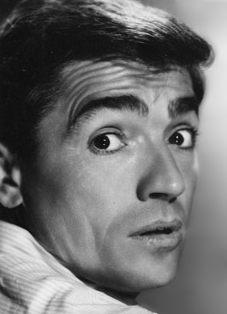
- Gorgatti in 1968
- Born: 5 December 1919; Rovigo, Kingdom of Italy
- Died: 11 May 2023 (aged 103); Buenos Aires, Argentina
- Occupation: Actor
- Years active: 1935–2023

Guido Gorgatti (5 December 1919 – 11 May 2023) was an Italian-born Argentine film actor. He emigrated to Argentina when he was 10 years old. He appeared in more than 25 films.

Gorgatti turned 100 in December 2019 and died on 11 May 2023 at the age of 103.

== Filmography ==
=== Film ===
Year	Title	Role	Director
1935	Pibelandia	Unknown	Augusto César Vatteone
1950	Una Noche en El Relámpago	Unknown	Miguel Coronatto Paz
1952	Bárbara atómica	Unknown	Julio Saraceni
1954	Romeo and Juliet	Unknown	Enrique Carreras
1954	Somos todos inquilinos	Cacho	Enrique Carreras; Juan Carlos Thorry; Carlos Torres Ríos
1961	An American in Buenos Aires	Unknown	George Cahan
1964	Il Gaucho	Giulio	Dino Risi
1965	Disloque en el presidio	Man on Puente Valentín Alsina	Julio Saraceni
1965	La pérgola de las flores	Pierre	Román Viñoly Barreto
1965	Ritmo nuevo y vieja ola	TV Director	Enrique Carreras
1966	De profesión, sospechosos	Journalist	Enrique Carreras
1967	La Cigarra está que arde	Japanese Man	Lucas Demare
1967	Would You Marry Me?	Modisto	Enrique Carreras
1968	Villa Cariño está que arde	Jose Tapia	Emilio Vieyra
1971	El Caradura y la millonaria	Unknown	Enrique Cahen Salaberry
1973	Hoy le toca a mi mujer	Policeman	Enrique Carreras
1975	La super, super aventura	Daniel	Enrique Carreras
1976	The Kids Grow Up	Cirilo	Enrique Carreras
1979	Millonarios a la fuerza	Teacher	Enrique Dawi
1979	Vivir con alegría	Basola	Palito Ortega
1983	Los fierecillos se divierten	Malculi	Enrique Carreras
1985	Mingo y Aníbal contra los fantasmas	Neighbour	Enrique Carreras
1986	Las Aventuras de Tremendo	Unknown	Enrique Cahen Salaberry
1986	Rambito y Rambón primera misión	Building Manager	Enrique Carreras
1986	Mingo y Aníbal en la mansión embrujada	Don Ramiro	Enrique Carreras
1991	Delito de corrupción	Cogote	Enrique Carreras

== Bibliography ==
- Peter Cowie & Derek Elley. World Filmography: 1967. Fairleigh Dickinson University Press, 1977.
