= Where the Wind Dies =

Allá donde muere el viento
- Tippi Hedren
- Directed by: Fernando Siro
- Written by: Enrique Torres
- Produced by: Fernando Siro
- Starring: John Russell; Mala Powers
- Cinematography: Aníbal Di Salvo
- Release date: 1976
- Country: Argentina
- Language: English

Allá donde muere el viento (Where The Wind Dies) is a 1976 Argentine drama film directed by Fernando Siro and written by Enrique Torres. The film stars John Russell, Tippi Hedren and Mala Powers.

== Other cast ==
- María Aurelia Bisutti
- Tom Castronuova
- Robert Dore
- Valeria Franco
- Ovidio Fuentes
- Inda Ledesma
- Enrique Liporace
- Nelly Panizza
- Ignacio Quirós
- Carlos La Rosa

== Release ==
The film premiered in 1976.
