= Voy a hablar de la esperanza =

- Directed by: Carlos F. Borcosque
- Written by: Carlos F. Borcosque, Carlos Borsani
- Cinematography: Andrés Martorell De Llanza
- Edited by: Vicente Castagno
- Release date: 1 July 1966
- Running time: 93 minute
- Country: Argentina
- Language: Spanish

Voy a hablar de la esperanza is a 1966 Argentine film directed by Carlos F. Borcosque and starring Alfredo Alcón, Inda Ledesma and Raúl Rossi.

== Cast ==
- Alfredo Alcón
- Inda Ledesma
- Raúl Rossi
- Carlos Borsani
- Lydia Lamaison
- Horacio Casals
- Luis Manuel de la Cuesta
- Virginia Lago
