= Allá en el Norte =

- Film poster
- Directed by: Julio Saraceni
- Written by: Abel Santacruz and Luis Saslavsky
- Starring: Lolita Torres; Carlos Estrada; Jorge Barreiro
- Cinematography: Pedro Marzialetti
- Edited by: Ricardo Rodríguez Nistal
- Music by: Víctor Buchino
- Release date: 19 April 1973
- Running time: 100 minute
- Country: Argentina
- Language: Spanish

Allá en el Norte (English language: Somewhere in the North) is a 1973 Argentine musical comedy film directed by Julio Saraceni and written by Abel Santacruz. The film stars Lolita Torres, Carlos Estrada and Jorge Barreiro. It was created by Alberto Migré.
