= The Girl's Houseboy =

El mucamo de la niña
- Film poster
- Directed by: Enrique Carreras, Juan Sires
- Written by: Nato Lamarque, adapted from his play of the same name
- Produced by: Nicolás Carreras
- Starring: Lolita Torres, Alfredo Barbieri, Tito Climent and Gogó Andreu
- Cinematography: Roque Funes
- Edited by: José Cardella
- Music by: Ramón Zarzoso
- Distributed by: Productora General Belgrano
- Release date: October 24, 1951
- Running time: 77 minutes
- Country: Argentina
- Language: Spanish

The Girl's Houseboy (El mucamo de la niña) is a 1951 Argentine musical comedy film of the classical era of Argentine cinema, directed by Enrique Carreras on his directorial debut with Juan Sires. It is based on a play by Nato Lamarque, which he adapted for the screen. It stars Lolita Torres, Alfredo Barbieri, Tito Climent and Gogó Andreu and was released on 24 October 1951 in Buenos Aires.

== Plot ==
A young man goes to work as a servant in a millionaire's house to look after his daughter.

== Cast ==
- Lolita Torres as Lucy Saravia
- Alfredo Barbieri as Miguelito
- Tito Climent as Tito
- Gogó Andreu as Gogó
- Alejandro Maximino as don Roque Saravia
- Domingo Márquez as Eduardo
- Marcos Zucker as Alberto
- Max Citelli as Rómulo
- Virginia de la Cruz as Alicia
- Gloria Castilla as Elsa
- Jorge Larrea as poker player
- Milita Brandon
- Rómulo Real
- Fina Suárez

== Reception ==
King in El Mundo said the film was: "Direct in its comedy and fast in its action." Raúl Manrupe and María Alejandra Portela in their book Un diccionario de films argentinos (1930–1995) write (translated from Spanish): "Enrique Carreras combined the songs of the juvenile Lolita and the humor of Barbieri to achieve a hit".
