= 1978 in Argentina =

- Decades: 1950s; 1960s; 1970s; 1980s; 1990s
- See also: Other events of 1978; List of years in Argentina

The following are events from the year 1978 in Argentina.

== Incumbents ==
- President: Jorge Rafael Videla (De Facto)
- Vice President: Vacant

=== Governors ===
- Governor of Buenos Aires Province: Ibérico Saint-Jean (de facto)

== Events ==
=== June ===
- 1 June: The 1978 FIFA World Cup begins in Argentina.
- 25 June: World Cup hosts Argentina defeat the Netherlands 3-1 at the Estadio Monumental in extra time to win the 1978 FIFA World Cup.

=== December ===
- 22 December: Argentina launches Operation Soberanía, a military invasion of Chile due to the Beagle conflict. A few hours later, the invasion is halted and Argentine forces retreat from the conflict zone without a fight.

== Births ==
=== January ===
- 7 January - Emilio Palma, first human born in Antarctica

=== March ===
- 29 March - Alejandra Oliveras, boxer (d. 2025)

=== April ===
- 19 April - Gabriel Heinze, football player

=== May ===
- 16 May - Lionel Scaloni, football coach and former player

=== June ===
- 19 June - Mia Maestro, actress and singer
- 21 June - Ignacio Corleto, rugby union player
- 24 June - Juan Román Riquelme, footballer
- 26 June - Cristian Lucchetti, footballer

=== August ===
- 5 August - Carolina Duer, boxer

== Deaths ==
=== August ===
- 26 August – José Manuel Moreno, footballer (b. 1916)

=== November ===
- 24 November – Nelly Moretto, composer (b. 1925)

== See also ==
- List of Argentine films of 1978

== Cited works ==
- Amato, Alberto; Pavon, Héctor; Rubín, Sergio; Lecziky, Uri; Guido, Braslavsky (1998). "El belicismo de los dictadores, Instrucciones Políticas Particulares para la Zona Austral para la Etapa Posterior a la Ejecución de Actos de Soberanía en las Islas en Litigio". Clarin (in Spanish). Buenos Aires (published 20 December 1998). Archived from the original on 15 April 2011.
