= La mejor del colegio =

1953 film by Julio Saraceni

La Mejor del colegio
- Directed by: Julio Saraceni
- Written by: Tito Insausti and Arnaldo Malfatti (play)
- Screenplay by: Abel Santacruz
- Starring: Lolita Torres; Teresita Pagano
- Cinematography: Antonio Merayo
- Edited by: Jorge Gárate
- Music by: Ramón Zarzoso
- Distributed by: Argentina Sono Film
- Release date: 18 June 1953
- Running time: 91 minutes
- Country: Argentina
- Language: Spanish

La Mejor del colegio (The best girl of college) is a 1953 Argentine musical comedy film of the classical era of Argentine cinema, directed by Julio Saraceni and starring Lolita Torres and Teresita Pagano.

== Cast ==
- Lolita Torres: María del Carmen Vallejo / María del Carmen Pérez / mother of María del Carmen
- Teresita Pagano: Aurora / Aurora Pérez (friend of María del Carmen)
- Francisco Álvarez: mr. Martín (grandfather of María del Carmen)
- Alberto Dalbés: Doctor Marcelo Carracedo
- Bertha Moss: Patricia
- Nelly Lainez: Antonia (false wife of doctor Carracedo)
- José Comellas: Gervasio Vallejo (father of María del Carmen)
- María Armand: mrs. Mercedes (grandmother of María del Carmen)
- Pedro Pompillo: mr. Bernardo
- Ramón Garay: inspector Saporiti
- Vicente Rubino: Valentín
- Teresa Blasco: pupil of the college
- Egle Martin: Nélida
- Roberto Bordoni: manager of the Hotel
- Arsenio Perdiguero: resident of the apartment number 150
