= Ambar La Fox =

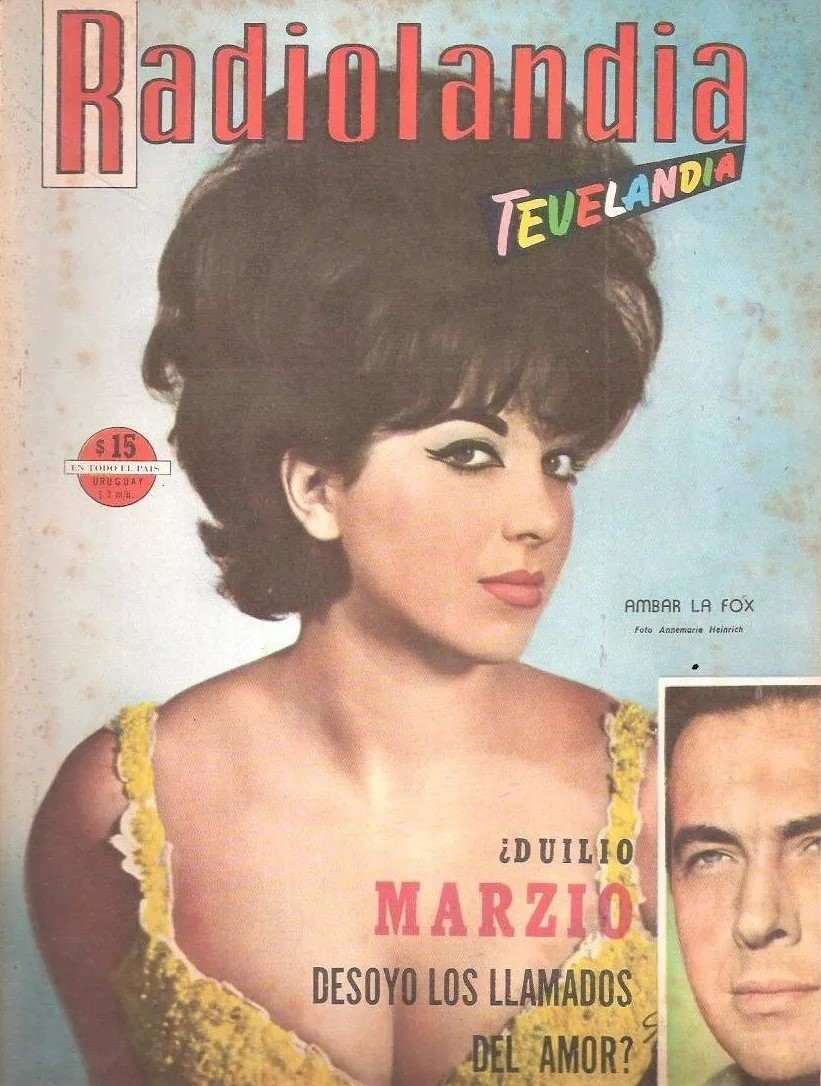
Ámbar La Fox by Annemarie Heinrich (1964)

Ambar La Fox (born Amanda Lasausse; February 10, 1935 in Buenos Aires – December 8, 1993), was an Argentine actress, dancer, singer and Diva. In 1977, she starred in the theatre show “Chicago” with Nelida Lobato. She also was known as a film actress, and for musical shows on television.

Her daughter Reina Reech has inherited her artistic natural vocation (also from her father the acrobat “Alejandro Maurin”). Reina is currently part of the cast of several movies, television and theatre shows.

Most of her filming career was in adult-oriented comedies, acting opposite Alberto Olmedo, Jorge Porcel.

== Ambar La Fox movies ==
Comedy films
Villa Cariño está que arde	1968	The Villa of Love is on Fire
Orden de matar	1965	Order to Kill
Cuidado con las colas	1964	Watch Your Back
Buenas noches, Buenos Aires	1964	Good Night, Buenos Aires
Disloque en Mar del Plata	1964	Chaos in Mar del Plata
Las mujeres los prefieren tontos	1964	Women Prefer Stupid Men
Dr. Cándido Pérez, señoras	1962	Dr. Candido Perez for Ladies
