= The Three Musketeers (1946 film) =

- Directed by: Julio Saraceni
- Written by: Hugo Mac Dougall
- Based on: The Three Musketeers; 1844 novel by Alexandre Dumas
- Produced by: Jaime Prades
- Starring: Armando Bó; Roberto Airaldi; Francisco Pablo Donadio; Inda Ledesma
- Cinematography: Antonio Merayo; Bob Roberts
- Music by: Juan Ehlert
- Production company: Filmadora Latinoamericana
- Release date: 1946
- Running time: 103 minutes
- Countries: Argentina; Uruguay
- Language: Spanish

The Three Musketeers (Spanish:Los tres mosqueteros) is a 1946 Argentine-Uruguayan historical adventure film of the classical era of Argentine cinema, directed by Julio Saraceni and starring Armando Bó, Roberto Airaldi and Francisco Pablo Donadio. It is one of a number of film adaptations of Alexandre Dumas's 1844 novel The Three Musketeers. It was part of a growing trend for co-productions in Latin American filmmaking. Much of the film was shot in Montevideo.

== Cast ==
- Armando Bó as d'Artagnan
- Roberto Airaldi as Athos
- Francisco Pablo Donadio as Porthos
- Miguel Moya as Cardinal Richelieu
- Enrique Roldán as Rochefort
- César Fiaschi as Rey
- Andrés Mejuto
- Inda Ledesma
- Pedro Becco
- Augusto Codecá
- Mario Nervi
- Ramón Otero

== Bibliography ==
- Balderston, Daniel & Gonzalez, Mike & Lopez, Ana M. Encyclopedia of Contemporary Latin American and Caribbean Cultures. Routledge, 2014.
