= Nadie oyó gritar a Cecilio Fuentes =

- Directed by: Fernando Siro
- Written by: Dalmiro Sáenz
- Cinematography: Humberto Peruzzi
- Edited by: Jorge Gárate
- Music by: Tito Ribero
- Release date: 1965
- Running time: 77 minute
- Country: Argentina
- Language: Spanish

Nadie oyó gritar a Cecilio Fuentes is a 1965 Argentine film.

The story follows an investigation into an attack on Cecilio Fuentes, in which the inspector in charge struggles to persuade local residents to testify against the gang responsible, as they fear retaliation.

== Cast ==
- Alberto Argibay
- Laura Bove
- Elena Cruz
- Graciela Dufau
- Zulma Grey
- Diana Maggi
- Luis Medina Castro
- Lautaro Murúa
- Ignacio Quirós
- Rodolfo Ranni
- Mario Savino
- Fernando Siro
- Walter Vidarte as El Mochila
