= Cuatro balazos =

1964 film

Four Bullets for Joe
- Film poster
- Spanish: Sonaron cuatro balazos
- Directed by: Agustín Navarro
- Screenplay by: Fernando Galiana; Mario Guerra; Julio Porter; Vittorio Vighi
- Story by: Fernando Galiana; José Mallorquí; Julio Porter
- Produced by: Fernando de Fuentes
- Starring: Paul Piaget; Fernando Casanova; Liz Poitel; Barbara Nelli; Ángela Cavo
- Cinematography: Ricardo Torres
- Edited by: Mercedes Alonso
- Music by: Manuel Parada
- Production companies: Cineproduzione Emo Bistolfi; C. Fénix Films
- Distributed by: Nora-Filmverleih; J.J. Films S.A.
- Release dates: 17 July 1964 (Mexico); 29 June 1964 (Italy)
- Running time: 74 min
- Countries: Spain; Italy
- Language: Spanish

Four Bullets for Joe (Spanish: Sonaron cuatro balazos or Cuatro balazos) is a 1964 Spanish-Italian Western film directed by Agustín Navarro, scored by Manuel Parada, screenplayed by Fernando Galiana, Mario Guerra, José Mallorquí, Julio Porter, Vittorio Vighi and portrayed by Paul Piaget, Fernando Casanova, Liz Poitel, Barbara Nelli, Ángela Cavo and Britt Ekland.

== Cast ==
- Paul Piaget as Frank Dalton
- Fernando Casanova as Sheriff Paul
- Liz Poitel as Katy (as Liz Poiter)
- Barbara Nelli as Margaret (as Barbara Nelly)
- Ángela Cavo as Helen
- Paco Morán as John (as Frank Moran)
- Tullio Altamura as juror
- Rafael Bardem as judge
- Juan Cazalilla as barman
- Juan Cortés as juror
- Miguel del Castillo as servant
- Luigi Del Pizzo as juror
- José Ángel Espinosa as a drunk
- Tito García as juror
- José Marco as Henry (as John Marco)
- Fernando Montes as Albert
- José Riesgo as Richard
- Bruno Scipioni as juror
- Britt Ekland
