= José Marrone =

Argentine actor and humorist

José Carlos Marrone
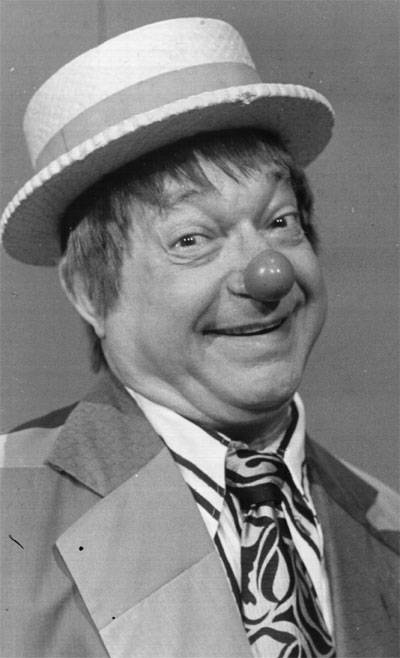
- Born: October 25, 1915; Manhattan, New York, U.S.
- Died: June 27, 1990 (aged 74); Buenos Aires
- Other name: Pepitito
- Occupation: Actor

José Carlos Marrone (25 October 1915 in Buenos Aires – 27 June 1990 in Buenos Aires) was an Argentine actor and humorist.

His beginning was in vaudeville theaters and the radio; afterwards he hosted several children-oriented TV shows, such as "El Circo de Marrone" (Marrone's Circus), playing the clown character Pepitito. His recurring catchphrase was Cheee!

He married twice and had his daughter "Coqui", with his first wife, Rosa. While still married, Marrone fell in love with Juanita Martínez, but they waited to get together until Rosa died. In 2001, eleven years after Marrone's death, Juanita committed suicide, and her body was found with a picture of Marrone in her hands.

== Filmography ==
- Su última pelea (1949)
- La barra de la esquina (1950)
- Buenos Aires, mi tierra querida (1951)
- Vida nocturna]] (1955)
- Rebelde con causa (1961)
- Cristóbal Colón en la Facultad de Medicina (1962)
- El mago de las finanzas (1962)
- La chacota (1962)
- El turista (1963)
- Alias Flequillo (1963)
- De profesión sospechosos (1966)
- La cigarra está que arde (1967), released in English as La Cigarra is on fire.
- Patapúfete (1967)
- Pimienta y Pimentón (1970), released in English as Pepper and Red Pepper
- Balada para un mochilero (1971)
- Todos los pecados del mundo (1972)
- Sujeto volador no identificado (1980)
- Una viuda descocada (1980)
