= Estoy hecho un demonio =

- Directed by: Hugo Moser
- Release date: 1972
- Running time: 95 minute
- Country: Argentina
- Language: Spanish

Estoy hecho un demonio is a 1972 Argentine film. It was premiered in June 1972.

== Cast ==
- Francis Smith
- Juan Carlos Dual
- Ubaldo Martínez
- Santiago Bal
- Ricardo Dupont
- Marilú
- Cuny Vera
- Ricardo Méndez
- Jorge Barreiro
- Carlos Scazziota
- Ulises Dumont
- Gloria Gago
- Ricardo Lavié
- Osvaldo Terranova
- Hugo Caprera
