= Proceso a la conciencia =

- Directed by: Agustín Navarro
- Written by: Agustín Navarro (screenplay), Agustín Navarro (story)
- Produced by: J.A. Testa, Producciones Internacionales Cinematográficas Asociadas (PICASA)
- Starring: Guillermo Battaglia, Carmen de la Maza, Mercedes Llambí
- Cinematography: Américo Hoss
- Edited by: Gerardo Rinaldi; Antonio Ripoll
- Music by: Jorge López Rey
- Release date: 1964
- Running time: 82 minutes
- Countries: Argentina; Spain
- Language: Spanish

Proceso a la conciencia is a 1964 Argentine film.

== Cast ==
- Guillermo Battaglia
- Carmen de la Maza
- Mercedes Llambí
- Conchita Núñez
- Luis Rodrigo
- Eduardo Rudy
- António Vilar
- Olga Zubarry
