= The Intruder (1939 film) =

- Directed by: Julio Saraceni
- Written by: Álvaro Yunque
- Starring: María Esther Buschiazzo; Héctor Calcaño; Olga Casares Pearson
- Cinematography: José María Beltrán
- Music by: Hermes Peresini
- Release date: 29 March 1939
- Running time: 97 minutes
- Country: Argentina
- Language: Spanish

The Intruder (Spanish: La intrusa) is a 1939 Argentine drama film of the Golden Age of Argentine cinema directed by Julio Saraceni and starring María Esther Buschiazzo, Héctor Calcaño and Olga Casares Pearson.

== Cast ==
- María Esther Buschiazzo
- Héctor Calcaño
- Olga Casares Pearson
- Tito Climent
- Vicente Climent
- Josefina Dessein
- Sara Olmos
- Eduardo Sandrini
- Pedro Tocci
- Ángel Walk
- Samuel Santa

== Bibliography ==
- Rist, Peter H. Historical Dictionary of South American Cinema. Rowman & Littlefield, 2014.
