= Conchita Núñez =

Spanish actress (1943–2009)

- Born: María de la Concepción Núñez Garrido; 1943
- Died: 26 June 2009 (aged 65–66)
- Occupations: Actress, voice actress

María de la Concepción "Conchita" Núñez Garrido (1943 – 26 June 2009) was a Spanish actress.

== Biography ==
Conchita Núñez began her career on the radio in the 1950s, and in the early 1960s she switched to acting. She participated in variety shows, including Señorío del cante with El Príncipe Gitano and Pepe da Rosa (1964). She demonstrated her talent for singing in plays such as Eloísa está debajo de un almendro by Enrique Jardiel Poncela (1963), Relatively Speaking by Alan Ayckbourn (1968), La sopera by Robert Lamoreux (1972), and several works by Alfonso Paso: Educando a un idiota (1965), Una monja (1968), Nerón-Paso (1969), El armario (1969), and Tú me acostumbraste (1970).

She made a dozen films, including Valiente by Luis Marquina (1964), Proceso a la conciencia by Agustín Navarro (1964), and Las cicatrices by Pedro Lazaga (1967).

Despite this body of work, the Spanish public recognizes her less for her face than for her voice. She worked in dubbing in the 1960s, and began to do so exclusively in 1973, devoting more than 40 years (until a few months before her death) to this facet of film and television performance. She voiced famous cartoon characters like Pedro the goatherd in Heidi, Girl of the Alps (1974), Concetta in Marco, de los Apeninos a los Andes (1976), Pedrito in Once Upon a Time... Man (1978), Kira in Once Upon a Time... Space (1982), and Tom Sawyer in The Adventures of Tom Sawyer (1980). She also dubbed, among hundreds of others, the actresses Carole André (Mariana) on Sandokan (1976), Linda Evans (Krystle Carrington) on Dynasty (1982), Victoria Principal (Pamela Ewing) on Dallas (1989), and Joanna Cassidy (Margaret Chenowith) on Six Feet Under (2004).

She died on 26 June 2009 from a long illness.

== Filmography ==
Year	Title	Role	Notes
1962	Bahía de Palma		
1963	Los Guerrilleros	Amiga de Teresa	
1963	La pandilla de los once		
1964	Valiente	María Consuelo Alcalá	
1964	Proceso a la conciencia		
1965	Hands of a Gunfighter	Margaret Dixon	
1966	Jugando a morir	Lena	
1967	Las cicatrices	Reyes Benjumea	
1967	Aventura en el laboratorio	Clara	
1969	Educando a una idiota	Lola Vargas	
1970	Los extremeños se tocan	Marquesa de Fuenterría	
1972	Daughter of Dracula	Margot	
