= Blum (film) =

1970 film

- Directed by: Julio Porter
- Written by: Julio Porter, Enrique Santos Discépolo
- Starring: Darío Vittori; Nélida Lobato
- Cinematography: Ricardo Younis
- Edited by: Oscar Montauti
- Music by: Jorge López Ruiz
- Release date: 23 July 1970 (Argentina)
- Running time: 88-90 min.
- Country: Argentina
- Language: Spanish

Blum is a 1970 Argentine film directed by Julio Porter.

== Plot ==
A wealthy businessman who owns several businesses and a large foundation realizes that his affluent lifestyle and fortune cannot buy happiness.

== Cast ==
- Darío Vittori as Blum
- Nélida Lobato as Lucy
- Enzo Viena as Pereyra
- Maurice Jouvet as Aliso
- Mabel Manzotti as Renata
- Marta Ecco as Blum's Mistress
- Leda Zanda as Blum's Sister
