= Joven, viuda y estanciera (1970 film) =

- Directed by: Julio Sarceni
- Written by: Ariel Cortazzo
- Based on: Joven, viuda y estanciera by Claudio Martínez Payva
- Produced by: Argentina Sono Film
- Starring: Lolita Torres; Jorge Barreiro; Ignacio Quirós; Leonor Rinaldi
- Cinematography: Antonio Merayo
- Edited by: Jorge Garate
- Music by: Tito Ribero
- Distributed by: Argentina Sono Film
- Release date: September 24, 1970 (Argentina)
- Running time: 90 minutes
- Country: Argentina
- Language: Spanish

Joven, viuda y estanciera (English: Young Widow and the Station Wagon) is a 1970 Argentine film based on Claudio Martínez Payva's play of the same name. Produced in Eastmancolor, the film was directed by Julio Saraceni and written by Ariel Cortazzo. It stars Lolita Torres, Jorge Barreiro, Luis Landriscina, and Ignacio Quirós. The film was released in Argentina on September 24, 1970.

== Cast ==
- Lolita Torres
- Jorge Barreiro
- Ignacio Quirós
- Leonor Rinaldi
- Elena Lucena
- Luis Landriscina
- Guillermo Battaglia
- Gerardo Chiarella
- Emilio Vidal
