= Silvia Montanari =

Argentine actress (1943–2019)

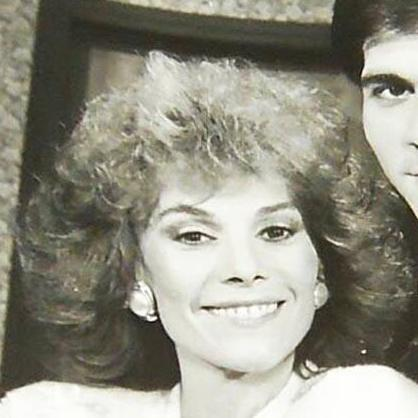
- Born: January 14, 1943; Quilmes Partido
- Died: October 26, 2019 (aged 76); Buenos Aires
- Occupation: actor
- Spouse: Abel Santa Cruz
- Partner: Dario Grandinetti
- Children: Rodrigo Aragón

Silvia Montanari (January 14, 1943 – October 26, 2019) was an Argentine actress.

== Life ==
Montanari was born in Quilmes Partido in 1943. She made her film debut in Masterpieces of Terror when she was eighteen.

When she was 21, she married the successful film playwright Abel Santa Cruz. The marriage lasted a year. Abel Santa Cruz went on to marry again and to write many more film scripts. Montanari worried that critics would say that she had married him to advance her career.

Montanari is remembered for starring in Arthur Miller's play Panorama from the bridge with Alfredo Alcón in the theatre.

When she was 40 she had an affair with the 24 year old Dario Grandinetti. She broke off the relationship revealing later that it was because of their age difference. and the fuss that was made. The relationship lasted two years, although Montanari said that is should have been longer.

In soap operas she was the heroine of La Cruz de Marisa Cruces, La Sombra, Stefania, Between love and power, All yours, The lion and the rose, and When love is guilty.

In the 1990s, he starred in the telecomedy Son de ten for three years. Years later she was the villain in Alen Moonlight and Emerald Necklace. Her last film in 2017 was the horror genre "Mirada de cristal". The film by Leandro Montejano and Ezequiel Endelman was shown in horror conventions. In 1998 she took a role in the Argentine telenovela Gasoleros where the drama takes place in and around a car workshop and a local bar owned by Montanari's character Emilia. Gasoleros won nine Martín Fierro Awards, the highest award in Argentine television.

Montanari died in Buenos Aires in 2019; she had been given an award watched by 1,000 other actors earlier that year. The Podestá Award was given by the Argentine Association of Actors in recognition of her career.
