= Celia Geraldy =

Argentine actress (born 1977)

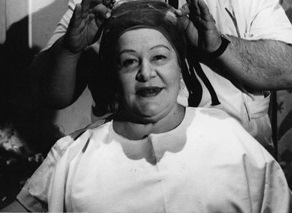
Celia Geraldy

Celia Geraldy (Buenos Aires, Argentina, ? – Buenos Aires, 1977) was an Argentine vedette actress in film and theater. She was a femme fatale at the beginning of Argentina's golden decade of cinema.

== Filmography ==
- Confesión (1940)
- Eclipse de sol (1943)
- Pasión imposible (1943)
- La piel de zapa (1943)
- Los dos rivales (1944)
- La danza de la fortuna (1944)
- La casta Susana (1944)
- Mujeres que bailan (1949)
- Yo no elegí mi vida (1949)
- Arrabalera (1950)
- Los Pérez García (1950)
- Cinco grandes y una chica (1950)
- Abuso de confianza (1950)
- El zorro pierde el pelo (1950)
- Escándalo nocturno (1951)
- Deshonra (1952)
- Vigilantes y ladrones (1952)
- Trompada 45 (1953)
- Uéi Paesano (1953)
- Un hombre cualquiera (1954)
- El Calavera (1954)
- Un novio para Laura (1955)
- Sangre y acero (1956)
- El jefe (1958)
- Yo quiero vivir contigo (1960)
- Bajo un mismo rostro (1962)
- Alias Flequillo (1963)
- Sombras en el cielo (1964)
- El gordo Villanueva (1964)
- Necesito una madre (1966)
- Una máscara para Ana (1966)
