= Un novio para Laura =

- Release date: 1955
- Country: Argentina
- Language: Spanish

Un novio para Laura is a 1955 Argentine film, directed by Julio Saraceni and starring Lolita Torres and Alberto Berco. Filming took place in Buenos Aires.

== Cast ==
- Lolita Torres as Laura Mendez Peñalba
- Alberto Berco........Damian Dinardo
- Francisco Álvarez...uncle Gregorio
- Isabel Pradas as Florinda, Laura's mother
- Julián Bourges as Felipe Arrillaga
- José Comellas as Ramiro, Laura' father
- Diana Myriam Jones as Liliana, Laura's little sister
- Liria Marín as Patricia, Laura's younger sister
- Rolando Dumas as Anibal, Patricia's boyfriend
- Adelaida Soler as Manon Fuentes
- Carlos Cotto as Damian's father
- Rafael Diserio as Gervasio, Damian's false father
- Warly Ceriani as Dante Mendoza
- Mara Valpi
- Celia Geraldy as Damian' false mother
- Esperanza Otero as Damian's mother
- Roberto Bordoni as Lombardo
- Alberto Rella
- Osvaldo Cabrera
- Silvio Soldán
