= The Age of Love (1954 film) =

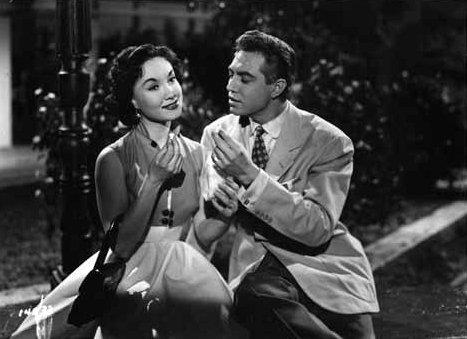
- Lolita Torres and Alberto Dalbés
- Directed by: Julio Saraceni
- Written by: Abel Santacruz
- Starring: Lolita Torres; Alberto Dalbés; Floren Delbene
- Cinematography: Aníbal González Paz
- Edited by: Jorge Gárate
- Music by: Ramón Zarzoso
- Release date: 29 January 1954
- Running time: 105 minutes
- Country: Argentina
- Language: Spanish

The Age of Love (Spanish:La edad del amor) is a 1954 Argentine musical comedy film of the classical era of Argentine cinema, directed by Julio Saraceni and starring Lolita Torres, Alberto Dalbés and Floren Delbene.

== Plot summary ==
The film follows a young aristocrat who wishes to marry a famous singer, but his father destroyed the marriage before the wedding, believing that singer is not suitable wife for his son. After several years, their adult children now meet in a theater in Buenos Aires.

== Cast ==
- Lolita Torres as Soledad Reales "The Spark" / Ana María Rosales
- Alberto Dalbés as Alberto Mendez Tejada son / Alberto Miranda
- Floren Delbene as Alberto Mendez Tejada father
- Domingo Sapelli as Alberto Mendez Tejada grandfather
- Morenita Galé as Marta Bibí
- Ramón Garay as Mr. Mendiondo
- Mario Faig as Sampietro
- Luis García Bosch as Capuano
- Julián Pérez Ávila as Pedro
- Lina Bardo as Elvira García
- Thelma Jordán as chorus girl
- Roberto Bordoni
- Carmen Giménez as Mrs. Laura
- Rafael Diserio as the servant of the Mendez Tejada family

== Bibliography ==
- Plazaola, Luis Trelles. South American Cinema: Dictionary of Film Makers. La Editorial, UPR, 1989.
