= The Bad Life (film) =

1973 film by Hugo Fregonese

- Directed by: Hugo Fregonese
- Produced by: Peter Baldwin
- Starring: Baldwin Peterson
- Release date: 1973
- Running time: 115 minute
- Country: Argentina
- Language: Spanish

The Bad Life (Spanish: La Mala vida) is a 1973 Argentine crime film directed by Hugo Fregonese.

== Partial cast ==
- Hugo del Carril as Víctor, The French
- Soledad Silveyra
- Víctor Laplace
- Ignacio Quirós
- Tito Alonso
- Idelma Carlo
- María Vaner
- Jorge Rivera López
- Héctor Méndez
- María Rosa Gallo
- Adrian Ghio
- Iván Grondona
- Guillermo Macro
- Ricardo Bouzas
- Elizabeth Makar
- José María Fra
- Alberto Segado
- Hugo Mújica

== Bibliography ==
- Rist, Peter H. Historical Dictionary of South American Cinema. Rowman & Littlefield, 2014.
