= Muchachos impacientes =

- Directed by: Julio Saraceni
- Written by: Alfredo Ruanova
- Release date: 1966
- Running time: 90 minute
- Country: Argentina
- Language: Spanish

Muchachos impacientes is a 1966 Argentine-mexican musical comedy film directed by Julio Saraceni and starring Simonette, Estela Molly, Claudia Mores, Emily Cranz and Marco Antonio Muñiz. This film marked the film debut of the actress and singer Simonette.

== Cast ==
- Susy Monet as Simonette
- Ringo Bonavena as himself
- Kitty Johnson as Emily Cranz
- Polo Márquez as Raúl Lavié
- Marcos Méndez as Marco Antonio Muñiz
- Néstor Duval as Juan Ramón
