= Cuando calienta el sol (film) =

- Directed by: Julio Saraceni
- Written by: Abel Santacruz
- Starring: Perla Alvarado; Susana André; María Armand
- Cinematography: Humberto Peruzzi
- Edited by: Vicente Castagno
- Music by: Horacio Malviccino
- Release date: 1963
- Running time: 95 minutes
- Country: Argentina
- Language: Spanish

Cuando calienta el sol is a 1963 Argentine film directed by Julio Saraceni.

It is also the title of a famous song of the period, first recorded by Los Hermanos Rigual in 1962 and subsequently by many other artists. Love Me with All Your Heart is the English version of the same tune.

== Cast ==
- Antonio Prieto
- Beatriz Taibo
- Augusto Codecá
- Perla Alvarado
- Nelson Prenat
- Héctor Calcaño
- María Armand
- Roberto Blanco
- Eduardo Humberto Nóbili
- Roberto Bordoni
- Ricardo de Rosas
- Susana André
- Alberto Barcel
- Gladys Gastaldi
- Tía Berta
- Roberto Raimundo
- Linda Renao
- Juan Carlos Cevallos
