= Amor Libre (1969 film) =

Amor libre
- Directed by: Fernando Siro
- Written by: Norberto Aroldi
- Release date: 22 May 1969
- Running time: 91 minute
- Country: Argentina
- Language: Spanish

Amor libre (English language: Free Love) is a 1969 Argentine romantic comedy film directed by Fernando Siro with a script by Norberto Aroldi.

== Release ==
The film was premièred in Argentina on 22 May 1969.

== Cast ==
- Juan Carlos Altavista .... Rubén
- Alberto Argibay .... Mario
- Elena Cruz .... Elba
- Zulma Faiad .... Queca
- María Esther Gamas .... Doña Catalina
- Gilda Lousek .... Julia
- Fernando Siro
- Enzo Viena .... Juan
- Tino Pascali
- Jacques Arndt
- Rafael Chumbito
- Felice D'Amore
- Lucio Deval
- Blanca Lagrotta
- Carlos Lagrotta
