= Alberto Dalbés =

Argentine actor (1922–1983)

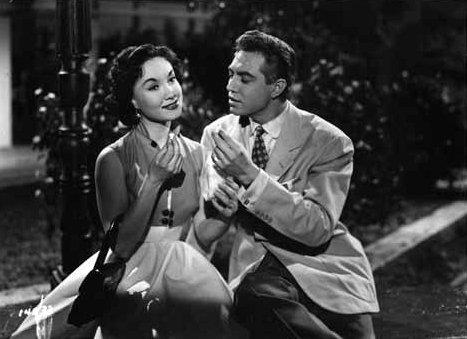
- With Lolita Torres in The Age of Love (1954)
- Born: 3 April 1922; Rosario, Argentina
- Died: 14 September 1983 (aged 61); Madrid, Spain
- Other name: Francisco Eduardo Eyres Martínez
- Occupation: Actor
- Years active: 1943–1980

Alberto Dalbés (April 3, 1922 – September 14, 1983) was an Argentine film and television actor. who appeared in Argentinian and Spanish films, including horror films, giallo/ crime dramas (Night of the Assassins, A Quiet Place To Kill) and spaghetti westerns (Cut-Throats Nine, 100 Rifles). He was known for his roles in eleven films directed by Jesus Franco including The Devil Came from Akasava (1971), Daughter of Dracula (1972), Tender and Perverse Emanuelle (1973), The Erotic Rites of Frankenstein (1973), Les Demons (1973), Un capitán de quince años (1974), Un Silencio de Tumba (1976), and Dracula, Prisoner of Frankenstein (1972). He also starred in Hunchback of the Morgue (1973) co-starring Paul Naschy and Maniac Mansion (1972). He died in Madrid in 1983, at age 61.

== Selected filmography ==
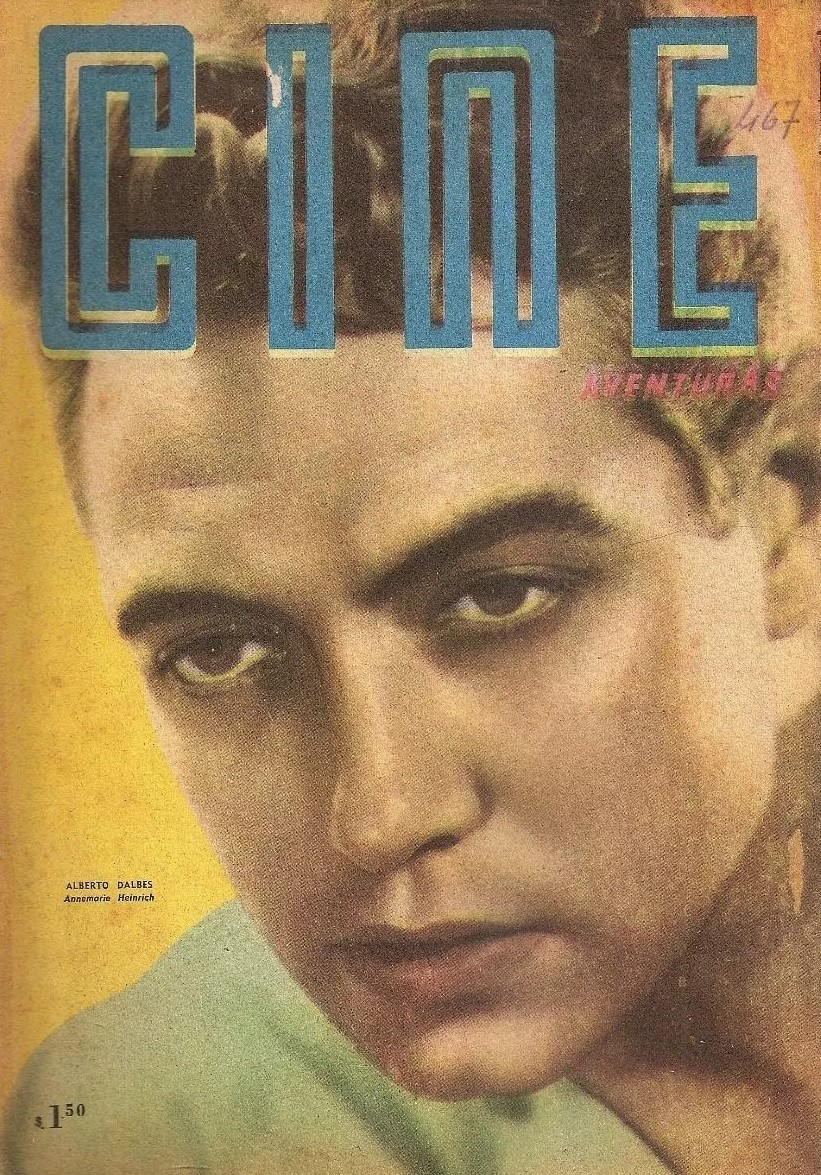
Alberto Dalbés by Annemarie Heinrich (1955)

- La juventud manda (1943)
- Juan Moreira (1948)
- Los secretos del buzón (1948)
- Ellos nos hicieron así (1952)
- La mejor del colegio (1953)
- Una ventana a la vida (1953)
- La voz de mi ciudad/ Voice of the City (1953)
- The Age of Love (1954)
- Más pobre que una laucha / Poorer Than a Mouse(1955)
- Canario rojo (1955)
- Vida nocturna (1955) - (uncredited)
- Rosaura at 10 O'clock (1958) - David Réguel
- El bote, el río y la gente (1960)
- Vacanze in Argentina (1960)
- El amor empieza en sábado (1961)
- Carnival of Crime (1962) - Photographer
- Su alteza la niña (1962) - Archiduque de Pomerania
- Operación Embajada (1963) - Óscar Madroño
- El sol en el espejo (1963) - Julio
- El juego de la verdad (1963) - Pablo
- Los muertos no perdonan (1963) - Antonio León
- Fuera de la ley (1964)
- El salario del crimen (1964) - Hermano de Elsa
- Assassination in Rome (1965)
- That Man in Istanbul (1965) - Thug
- Espionage in Tangier (1965) - Rigo Orie
- Vivir al sol (1965)
- Secuestro en la ciudad (1965) - Ignacio Armengol
- M.M.M. 83 (1966) - Renard
- Fata Morgana (1966) - Álvaro
- Ypotron - Final Countdown (1966) - Revel
- Danger!! Death Ray (1967) - Carver
- Another's Wife (1967) - Santiago
- Amor en el aire (1967) - Pinto Rosado
- Play-Boy (1967)
- Un colpo da mille miliardi (1968)
- Criminal Affair (1968) - Schwartz
- 100 Rifles (1969) - Padre Francisco
- Las trompetas del apocalipsis (1969) - Albert Stone
- A Quiet Place to Kill (1970) - Dr. Harry Webb
- Prana (1970) - Julio
- Helena y Fernanda (1970)
- Les belles au bois dormantes (1970) - Philippe
- The Devil Came from Akasava (1971) - Irving Lambert (uncredited)
- La araucana (1971) - Fiscal
- Cut-Throats Nine (1972) - Thomas Lawrence, 'Dandy Tom'
- Maniac Mansion (1972) - a.k.a. Murder Mansion directed by Francisco Lara Polop
- Dracula, Prisoner of Frankenstein (1972) - Doctor Jonathan Seward
- Pancho Villa (1972) - Mendoza
- Daughter of Dracula (1972) as Police Superintendent Ptuschko
- The Demons (1973) as Thomas Renfield
- Hunchback of the Morgue (1973) - Dr. Orla
- The Erotic Rites of Frankenstein (1973) - Doctor Seward
- Tender and Perverse Emanuelle (1973) - Gordon Douglas
- Relax Baby (1973) unfinished film
- El misterio del castillo rojo (1973) unfinished film
- Un capitán de quince años (1974) - Vargas
- Juegos de sociedad (1974) - Roque
- Night of the Assassins (1974) - Major Oliver Brooks
- ¡Ya soy mujer! (1975) - Padre de Ana
- One Man Against the Organization (1975) - Harry
- Un silencio de tumba (1976) - Juan Ribas
- Cuando Conchita se escapa, no hay tocata (1976)
- Kiss Me Killer (1977) - Freddy Carter (uncredited)
- Las desarraigadas (1977) - Sr. Riva-Medina
- El terrorista (1978) - Aranda
- Todos me llaman 'Gato' (1980) - Ruiz (final film role)

== Bibliography ==
- Mira, Alberto. The Cinema of Spain and Portugal. Wallflower Press, 2005.
