= Los Días calientes =

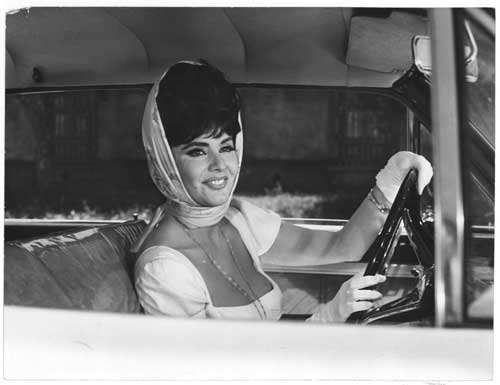
- Still with Isabel Sarli
- Directed by: Armando Bó
- Written by: Armando Bó
- Starring: Isabel Sarli
- Cinematography: Alfredo Traverso
- Edited by: Rosalino Caterbetti
- Music by: José Asunción, Ben Molar
- Production company: Sociedad Independiente Filmadora Argentina (S.I.F.A.)
- Distributed by: Columbia
- Release date: 1966
- Running time: 95 minutes
- Country: Argentina
- Language: Spanish

Los Días calientes is a 1966 Argentine comedy film directed by Armando Bó.

== Plot ==
This is the story of a woman who travels to the islands on the delta of the Parana River to fight for her inheritance.

== Cast ==
- Isabel Sarli
- Mario Passano
- Ricardo Passano
- Claude Marting
- Raúl del Valle
- Mario Casado
- Elcira Olivera Garcés
- Roberto Crohare
- Juan Pitrau
