= Agustín Navarro (director) =

Spanish film director

- Born: Agustín Navarro Cano; 1926; Cartagena, Murcia
- Died: July 14, 2001 (aged 74–75)
- Occupations: Film director, screenwriter and actor
- Spouse: Carmen de la Maza
- Children: 3: Agustín Navarro de la Maza; Regina Navarro de la Maza; Pablo Navarro de la Maza

Agustín Navarro (1926 – July 14, 2001) was a Spanish film director. He studied Philosophy. He directed films such as 15 bajo la lona (1959), El cerro de los locos (1960), Cuidado con las personas formales (1961), Una Jaula no tiene secretos (1962),Proceso a la conciencia (1964), Cuatro balazos (1964), El misterioso señor Van Eyck (1966), Camino de la verdad (1968), El día de mañana (1969) and Enseñar a un sinvergüenza (1970). He was married with the actress Carmen de la Maza and they had three children: Agustín, Regina and Pablo. He died on 14 July 2001 from a lung disease.

== Filmography ==
Year	Title	Director	Writer	Actor
1996	Noctámbulos			✓
1979	Operación Negro			✓
1978	Hail Hazana			✓
1976	Los libros	✓	✓	
1976	Manuela			✓
1976	El límite del amor			✓
1976	La espuela			✓
1971	La casa de los Martínez	✓	✓	
1970	Enseñar a un sinvergüenza	✓	✓	
1969	El día de mañana	✓		
1968	Camino de la verdad	✓		
1966	De profesión, sospechosos		✓	
1966	El misterioso señor Van Eyck	✓		
1964	Los gatos negros		✓	
1964	Proceso a la conciencia	✓	✓	
1964	Four Bullets for Joe	✓		
1962	Una jaula no tiene secretos	✓		
1961	Cuidado con las personas formales	✓	✓	
1960	El cerro de los locos	✓	✓	
1959	15 bajo la lona	✓	✓	
1958	Ávila		✓	
1958	La noche y el alba	✓		
1958	The Little Apartment	✓		
1958	Hablemos de amor (Salvemos el paisaje)	✓		
1956	Cumbres de Gran Canaria	✓	✓	
1956	Lanzarote	✓	✓	
1955	Pequeño continente	✓	✓	
1954	Novio a la vista	✓		
1951	Rostro al mar	✓		
1948	Paseo por una guerra antigua	✓	✓	
