= Una noche en El Relámpago =

- Directed by: Miguel Coronatto Paz
- Written by: Miguel Coronatto Paz
- Starring: Cristina de los Llanos; Guido Gorgatti; Mangacha Gutiérrez
- Release date: 1950
- Country: Argentina
- Language: Spanish

Una noche en El Relámpago is a 1950 Argentine film of the classical era of Argentine cinema, directed by Miguel Coronato Paz and starring Cristina de los Llanos, Guido Gorgatti, Mangacha Gutiérrez and Tincho Zabala. The film is based on a radio program created by the director.

== Cast ==
- Cristina de los Llanos
- Guido Gorgatti
- Mangacha Gutiérrez
- Tincho Zabala
