= Patolandia nuclear =

- Directed by: Julio Saraceni
- Written by: Héctor Maselli
- Starring: Rafael Carret; Alfredo Barbieri; Horacio Bruno
- Cinematography: Julio C. Lavera
- Edited by: Gerardo Rinaldi
- Music by: Mike Ribas
- Release date: 1978
- Running time: 90 minutes
- Country: Argentina
- Language: Spanish

Patolandia nuclear is a 1978 Argentine comedy film directed by Julio Saraceni.

== Cast ==
- Rafael Carret
- Luis Medina Castro
- Peggy Sol
- Tito Gómez
- Horacio Bruno
- Juan Díaz
- Alfredo Barbieri
- Jorge Godoy
- Javier Díaz
- Fabián Di Donato
