= Los peores del barrio =

- Release date: 1955
- Running time: 68 minute
- Country: Argentina
- Language: Spanish

Los peores del barrio is a 1955 Argentine film directed by Julio Saraceni.

== Cast ==
- Rafael Carret
- Hugo Chemin
- Alberto Contreras
- Zelmar Gueñol
- Jorge Luz
- Gloria Montes
