= Tito Climent =

Argentine singer and film actor

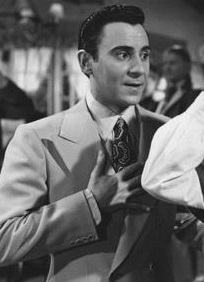
- Climent in a 1948 film
- Born: 1917; Buenos Aires, Argentina
- Died: 1988 (aged 70–71); Buenos Aires, Argentina
- Occupation: Singer
- Years active: 1935–1976 (film)

Tito Climent (1917–1988) was an Argentine singer and film actor.

== Selected filmography ==
- The Intruder (1939)
- Seven Women (1944)
- White Horse Inn (1948)
- Rhythm, Salt and Pepper (1951)

== Bibliography ==
- Eddie Sammons. Shakespeare: A Hundred Years on Film. Scarecrow Press, 2004.
