= Destino de un capricho =

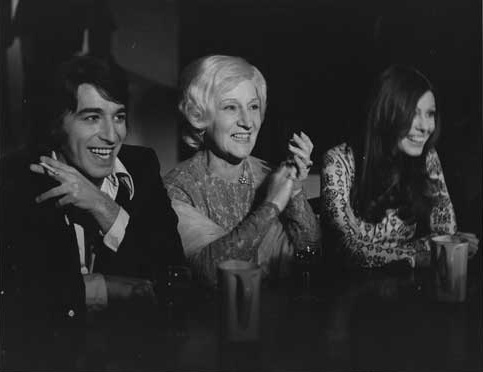
- Film still
- Directed by: Leo Fleider
- Written by: Abel Santa Cruz
- Starring: Sandro; Eva Franco; Cristina Alberó
- Cinematography: Ricardo Younis
- Edited by: Rosalino Caterbetti
- Distributed by: Producciones Cinematográficas 70
- Release date: 31 August 1972
- Running time: 94 minutes
- Country: Argentina
- Language: Spanish

Destino de un capricho is a 1972 Argentine musical comedy drama film directed by Leo Fleider.

== Cast ==
- Sandro as Daniel Mariño.
- Eva Franco as Doña Valentina Gómez Grau
- Mirta Massa as Daniel's Girlfriend.
- Cristina Alberó as Esther.
- Cristina Lemercier as María.
- Guillermo Battaglia as Doctor Barboa.
- Alberto Fernández de Rosa as José Garófalo.
- Walter Kliche as Ramiro.
- José María Pedroza as The Butler.
- Elena Forte as Liocadia.
- Esteban Serrador as Mr. Mariño.
- Virginia Romay as Esther's Mother.
- Herminia Franco as Pilar Gómez Grau.
