= La obertura =

- Directed by: Julio Saraceni
- Based on: La Obertura by Alfredo Ruanova
- Produced by: Joaquín Franco; Roberto Franco
- Starring: Enzo Vienna; Ethel Rojo; Amelita Vargas; Antonio Grimau
- Cinematography: Humberto Peruzzi
- Edited by: Atilio Rinald
- Music by: Mike Ribas (Music Director)
- Production company: Telecine SA
- Release date: 1977
- Running time: 85 minutes
- Country: Argentina
- Language: Spanish

La obertura is a 1977 Argentine comedy film directed by Julio Saraceni based on the play by Alfredo Ruanova. The film premiered on September 29, 1977 and starred Enzo Viena, Ethel Rojo, Amelita Vargas and Antonio Grimau. Eric Zepeda was in charge of the choreography.

== Synopsis ==
Daniel Vargas (Enzo Viena) is kidnapped following a case of mistaken identity. His wife Norma Vargas (Ethel Rojo) - believing he is dead - tries to use the disappearance to collect a large life insurance claim, but fails when he reappears alive.

== Cast ==
- Enzo Viena as Daniel Vargas
- Ethel Rojo as Norma Vargas
- Amelita Vargas as Beba Marquez
- Antonio Grimau as Antonio "Willy" Zúñiga
- Katia Iaros as Fanny
- Raimundo Soto as Mr. Trincabelli
- Nelly Láinez as a masseuse
- Beto Gianola as Kidnapper 1
- Ricardo Lavié as Kidnapper 2
- Mario Sapag as a drunk man
- Edda Bustamante as Daniel's first lover
- Don Pelele
- Angelica Perrone
- Silvia Balán
- Liliana Olivero
- Morena Jara
- Eva Olguin
- Norma Coria
