= Héctor Calcaño =

Argentine actor

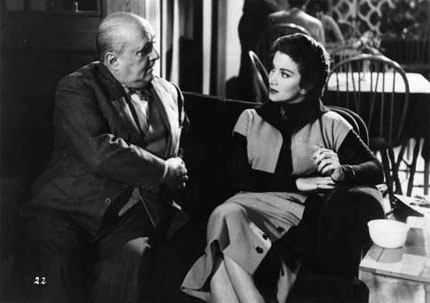
- Héctor Calcaño and Julia Sandoval in La Dama del millón (1956)
- Born: Héctor Calcagno; 1894; Buenos Aires, Argentina
- Died: 1969 (aged 74–75); Buenos Aires, Argentina
- Years active: 1933- 1968

Héctor Calcaño (born Héctor Calcagno, 1894–1969) was an Argentine film actor. He appeared in nearly 70 films between 1933 and 1968. He died on 7 September 1969.

== Filmography ==
- Este cura (1968) - a.k.a. Operación San Antonio (Argentina)
- La señora del intendente (1967) .... Mezadra - a.k.a. Señora del intendente-de-Ombú-quemado, La (Argentina: complete title)
- Escándalo en la familia (1967) - a.k.a. Scandal in the Family (International: English title)
- Canuto Cañete, detective privado (1965) .... Zorrilla
- Extraña ternura (1964) .... Señor Langoa
- El Gordo Villanueva (1964)
- La Cigarra no es un bicho (1964) .... Police Commissioner - Amour en quarantaine, L' (France: dubbed version) - The Cicada Is Not an Insect (literal English title) - The Games Men Play (USA)
- Cuando calienta el sol (1963)
- La Chacota (1962)
- La Maestra enamorada (1961)
- La Procesión (1960)
- The Candidate (1959)
- La Hermosa mentira (1958)
- Rosaura a las 10 (1958) - a.k.a. Rosaura at 10 o'clock (International: English title: literal title)
- La Morocha (1958)
- El Sonámbulo que quería dormir (1956)
- La Dama del millón (1956) - a.k.a. Veinte metros de amor (Argentina)
- Canario rojo (1955)
- El Barro humano (1955) - a.k.a. The Human Clay (USA)
- Concierto para una lágrima (1955)
- El Millonario (1955)
- Mi marido y mi novio (1955)
- Su seguro servidor (1954)
- Mujeres casadas (1954)
- La Cueva de Ali-Babá (1954) - a.k.a. The Cave of Ali Baba (International: English title: literal title)
- El Último cowboy (1954)
- La Pasión desnuda (1953) - a.k.a. Naked Passion (International: English title)
- End of the Month (1953)
- Payaso (1952)
- The Earring (1951)
- Concierto de bastón (1951)
- Cuidado con las mujeres (1951)
- La Mujer del león (1951)
- Arroz con leche (1950) - a.k.a. Rice and Milk (International: English title)
- Ladrón canta boleros, El (1950)
- Cita en las estrellas (1949)
- Fascinación (1949) - a.k.a. Fascination (International: English title)
- Hombre solo no vale nada, Un (1949)
- Hostería del caballito blanco, La (1948) - a.k.a. White Horse Inn (International: English title)
- Los Hijos del otro (1947)
- El Retrato (1947)
- La Casta Susana (1945) - a.k.a. Chaste Susan (International: English title)
- La Importancia de ser ladrón (1944)
- La Calle Corrientes (1943) - a.k.a. Locura del tango, La (Argentina)
- Una Novia en apuros (1942) - a.k.a. A Bride in Trouble (International: English title)
- Hay que casar an Ernesto (1941) - a.k.a. Ernest Must Be Married (International: English title)
- La Hora de las sorpresas (1941) - a.k.a. Surprise Hour (International: English title)
- Educating Niní (1940)
- La Luz de un fósforo (1940)
- El Susto que Perez se llevo (1940) - a.k.a. Lo que Perez se llevo (Argentina) - Pobre diablo, Un (Argentina)
- Campeón por una mujer (1939)
- The Intruder (1939)
- Mi suegra es una fiera (1939)
- El Sobretodo de Céspedes (1939)
- El Hombre que nació dos veces (1938)
- Adiós Buenos Aires (1938)
- Cadetes de San Martín (1937) - a.k.a. Cadets of St. Martin (USA)
- Compañeros (1936)
- Canillita (1936)
- El Conventillo de la paloma (1936)
- Goal (1936)
- El Alma de bandoneón (1935) - a.k.a. The Soul of the Accordion (USA)
- Noches de Buenos Aires (1935) - a.k.a. Buenos Aires Nights (USA)
- Picaflor (1935)
- Mañana es domingo (1934) .... Gerente
- Riachuelo (1934) - a.k.a. Brook (International: English title: literal title) (USA)
- Dancing (1933)
