= Disloque en Mar del Plata =

- Directed by: Conrado Diana
- Release date: 1964
- Running time: 73 minute
- Country: Argentina
- Language: Spanish

Disloque en Mar del Plata (English: Chaos in Mar del Plata) is a 1964 Argentine film, directed by Conrado Diana.

== Cast ==
- Délfor
- Jorge Porcel
- Calígula
- Mengueche
- Belinda
- Isabel Lainer
- Vicente La Russa
- Carlos Ferreyra
- Anita Almada
- Ámbar La Fox
- Alejandro Maurín
- René Oliver
- Raúl Rossi
- Ernesto Báez
