= Vlasta Lah =

Austro-Hungarian born Argentine film director

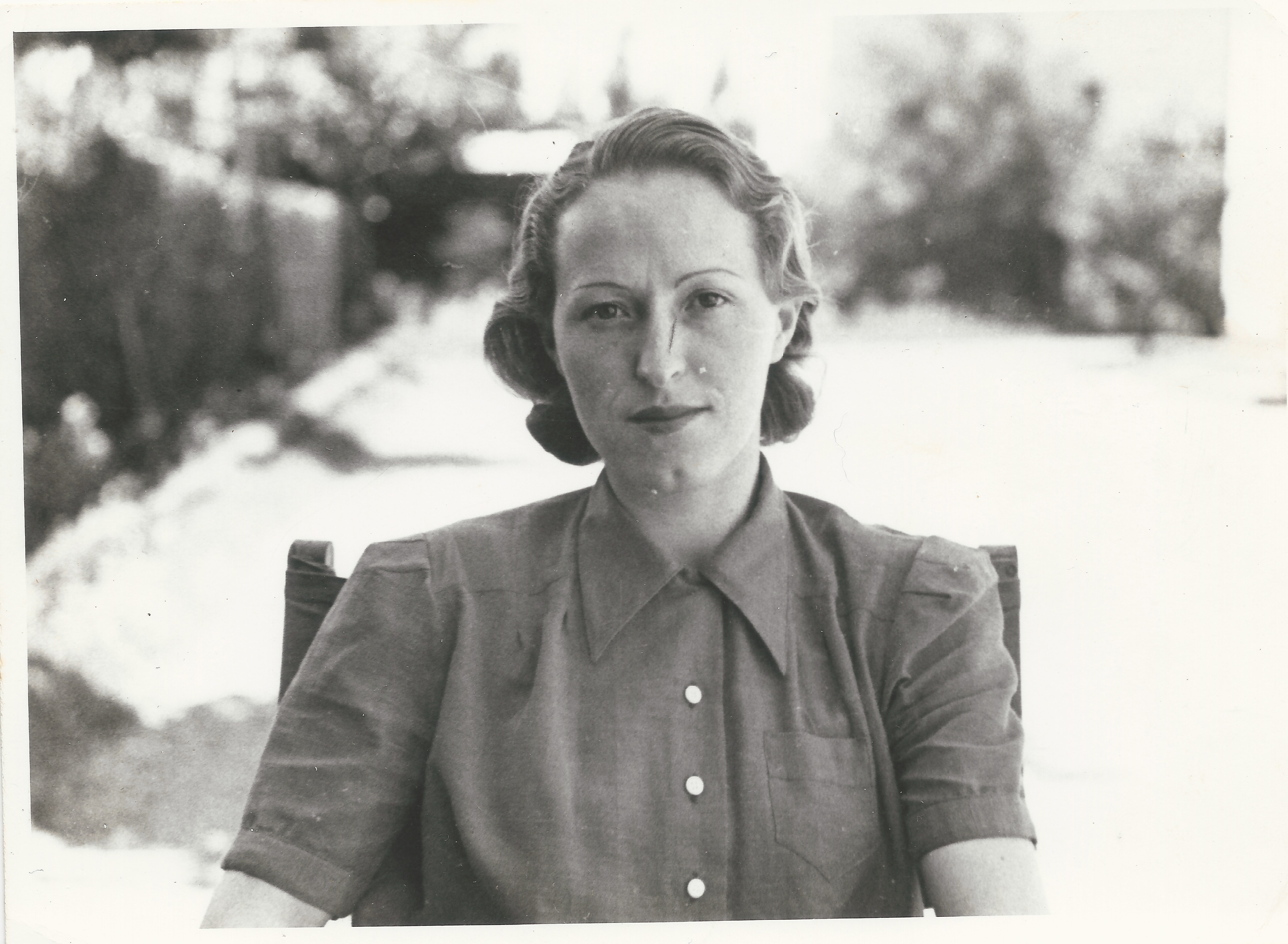
- Vlasta Lah at Estudios San Miguel in Buenos Aires, 1945.
- Born: Vlasta Giulia Lah Rocchi; January 13, 1913; Pula, Austria-Hungary (present-day Croatia)
- Died: July 12, 1978 (aged 65); Buenos Aires, Argentina
- Education: Centro Sperimentale di Cinematografia, Italy
- Occupations: Film director; screenwriter; assistant director
- Years active: c. 1942–1972
- Notable work: Las furias (1960); Las modelos (1963)
- Spouse: Catrano Catrani (m. 1938; died 1974)
- Children: 1

Vlasta Giulia Lah Rocchi (January 13, 1913 – July 12, 1978), known professionally as Vlasta Lah, was the first woman director of sound films in Argentine cinema, as well as the only woman filmmaker in Latin America in the 1960s. Before her, the only women filmmakers in the country worked during the silent era in the 1910s and early 1920s, before the industrial development of Argentine cinema.

Lah was born in Pula, then part of Austria-Hungary, and emigrated to Buenos Aires around 1930 with her husband and fellow filmmaker Catrano Catrani. She worked extensively as an assistant director for the film studio Estudios San Miguel, in films by renowned directors of the time. In 1960, she made her directorial debut with Las furias, which was followed by her final film Las modelos in 1963. Little is known of Lah's life and her figure had already been largely forgotten at the time of her death, although in recent years her figure has been rescued by critics and historians.

== Life and career ==
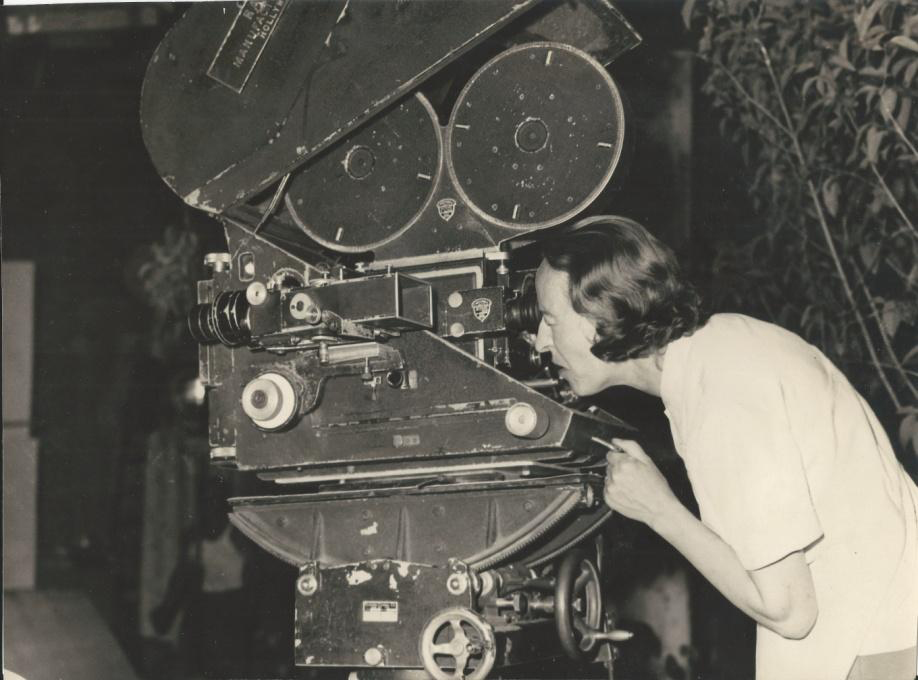
Lah during the shooting of Las furias (1960) at the Lumiton studios in Buenos Aires.

Vlasta Giulia Lah Rocchi was born on January 13, 1913, in Pula, then part of Austria-Hungary. Around 1930, she moved to Rome and enrolled at the Centro Sperimentale di Cinematografia to study acting, but later switched to film directing. In 1938, Lah married her colleague Catrano Catrani and they emigrated to Buenos Aires, where they pursued a career in the Argentine film industry, which at that time was going through its "Golden Age".

In the 1940s, Lah worked extensively as an assistant director at the film studio Estudios San Miguel, working with renowned directors of the time such as Mario Soffici, Carlos Schlieper, Hugo del Carril and Luis Saslavsky, among others, although she was unable to work as a director because the industry excluded women from such a role.

With the crisis of the studio system and the industrial model in the 1950s, both Lah and Catrani's careers followed the path of that of most Argentine filmmakers of the time, working independently with their own projects or by occasional contracts, such as commercials.

In 1960, she directed her first feature film, Las furias, which was a critical and commercial failure. Her second and final film Las modelos was released in 1963 and unlike its predecessor, it was well received by critics.

There is little information about Lah's life from the period between her second film and her death, including the reasons why she did not film again. In the rest of the 1960s, she worked as a screenwriter and translator for a few films, television, and theater projects. Lah, already a forgotten figure, died at the Hospital Italiano de Buenos Aires in 1978, two years after her husband.

== Legacy ==
Although her work was little appreciated by her contemporaries and she has been largely ignored by historians, in recent years she has been revalued as a pioneer of feminist cinema. In a 2022 list of the 100 Greatest Films of Argentine Cinema organized by magazines La vida útil, Taipei and La tierra quema, and presented at the Mar del Plata International Film Festival, her film Las furias reached the 50th position, and Las modelos the 62nd. Also in 2022, Las furias was included in Spanish magazine Fotogramas's list of the 20 best Argentine films of all time.

== Filmography ==
- Las furias (1960)
- Las modelos (1963)

== Media ==
- Vlasta, el recuerdo no es eterno (2026). Documentary film by Candela Vey and Tino Pereira.

== See also ==
- List of female film and television directors
