= Alias Flequillo =

- Theatrical release poster
- Directed by: Julio Saraceni
- Written by: Abel Santacruz
- Produced by: Julio Saraceni
- Starring: José Marrone; Inés Moreno
- Cinematography: Humberto Peruzzi
- Edited by: Jorge Gárate
- Music by: Tito Ribero
- Release date: 1963
- Running time: 90 minute
- Country: Argentina
- Language: Spanish

Alias Flequillo is a 1963 black-and-white Argentine comedy film directed by Julio Saraceni and written by Abel Santacruz. The film stars José Marrone and Inés Moreno.

== Plot ==
The film follows comic misadventures of a gangster wannabe.

== Cast ==
- Pepe Marrone …Orígenes Buendía / Atilio Degrossi, alias "Flequillo"
- Inés Moreno …La Pelipeli
- Florén Delbene …Comisario Inspector Andrada
- Perla Alvarado …La Floridori
- José de Ángelis …Parodi
- Adolfo García Grau …Oficial Romero
- Eduardo Humberto Nóbili …Juan José, alias "Galanacho"
- Humberto Selvetti …Carmelo, "el Gordo"
- Ricardo Jordán …Efraín Villoldo
- Celia Geraldy …Mujer en comisaría
- José Maurer …Sergio
- Roberto Blanco …Corbata
- Orestes Soriani …Inspector general
- Rafael Chumbita …Secuaz de Parodi
- Luisa Ruiz …Rosita Caporale
- Mario Savino …Caporale
- Raúl Ricutti …Preso
- Carlos Serafino …Locutor en TV
- Míster Chile …Luchador
- Zulma Grey …Mujer en pelea de catch
