= Ignacio Quirós =

Argentine actor

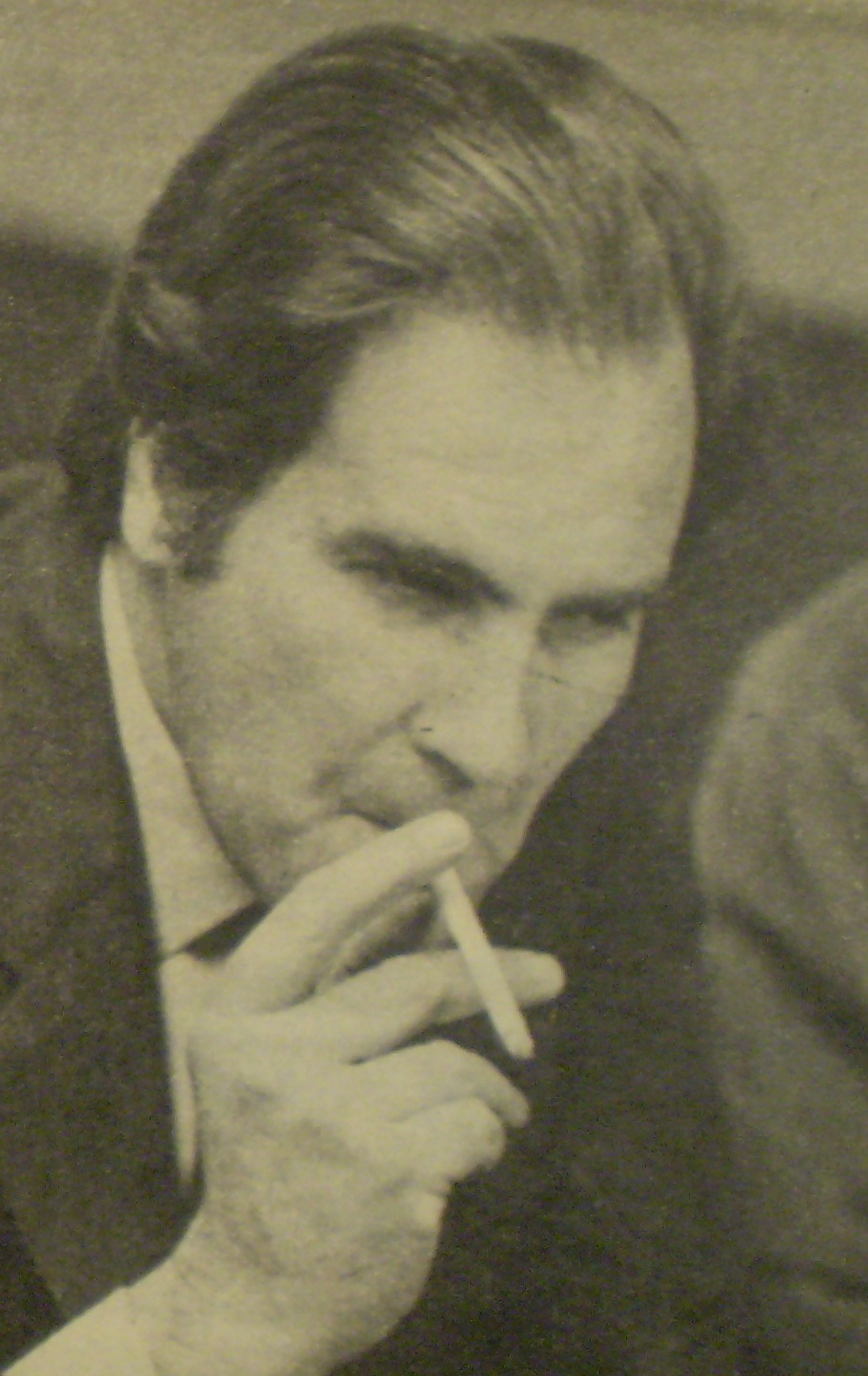
- Born: José Ignacio Rodriguez Meléndez; 1931; Vigo, Spain
- Died: December 1999 (aged 67–68); Buenos Aires, Argentina
- Occupation: Actor

José Ignacio Rodriguez Meléndez (1931 in Vigo, Spain – December 12, 1999, in Buenos Aires, Argentina) was an Argentine actor.

He died on December 12, 1999, in Buenos Aires, Argentina, from cancer

== Selected filmography ==
- 1959 - I Was Born in Buenos Aires
- 1962 - Rumbos malditos (unreleased)
- 1965 - Los Guerrilleros ... Bruno
- 1967 - En la selva no hay estrellas ... Man
- 1968 - Digan lo que digan ... Miguel
- 1968 - Asalto a la ciudad ... Julian
- 1970 - Joven, viuda y estanciera
- 1971 - Bajo el signo de la Patria ... General Manuel Belgrano
- 1973 - The Bad Life
- 1974 - The Great Adventure
- 1976 - Where the Wind Dies
- 1978 - Broken Comedy
- 1979 - Este loco amor loco
- 1979 - Contragolpe
- 1988 - Peculiar Attraction
- 1989 - Eversmile, New Jersey ... The Boss
