= Lolita Torres =

Argentine film actress and singer

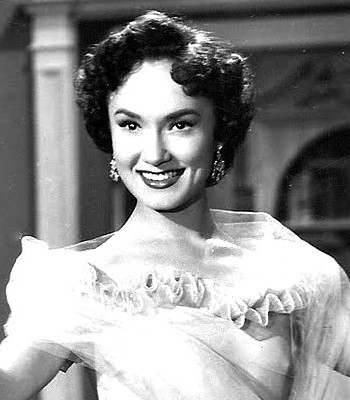
- Torres in Un novio para Laura (1955)
- Born: Beatriz Mariana Torres; 26 March 1930; Avellaneda, Argentina
- Died: 14 September 2002 (aged 72); Buenos Aires, Argentina
- Occupations: Actor, singer
- Years active: 1944 – 1993 (film)

Lolita Torres (born Beatriz Mariana Torres; 26 March 1930 – 14 September 2002) was an Argentine film actress and singer (soprano). She became famous during the Golden Age of Argentine cinema. She began as a child performer, with a stage debut in 1942 and a transition to film in 1944, she eventually starred in seventeen feature films. Torres was named a Ciudadano ilustre de la Ciudad Autónoma de Buenos Aires in 2002, and her popularity in the Soviet Union triggered a trend of newborn girls being named "Lolita" following her 1963 tour.

== Early life ==
Born Beatriz Mariana Torres on 26 March 1930, in Avellaneda, she was the only child of Pedro Torres and Angélica Cotón. The mother died when she was 14 years old. As a child, she was influenced by Imperio Argentina and Carlos Gardel. Her first performance was for a local haberdashery vendor, and she was paid with some items from his stock. When she was eight years old, she joined a contest on Radio Splendid by performing a song by Imperio. She studied at the Academia de Danza Gaeta.

She debuted on Friday, 8 May 1942, in the theater show Maravillas de España at the Avenida Theatre, located on Avenida de Mayo. Her pseudonym was created after she asked her family for a glamorous, attractive name to accompany her family name, Torres. In 1944 she began acting in films, eventually appearing in seventeen films during the Golden Age of Argentine cinema.

== Award and legacy ==
In 2002, she was honored as "Ciudadano Ilustre de la Ciudad de Buenos Aires" ("Illustrious Citizen of the City of Buenos Aires"). The Plaza Lolita Torres in her birthplace of Avellaneda is named for her. She was so popular in the Soviet Union that many newborn girls were named 'Lolita' after her tour there in 1963.

== Selected filmography ==
- La danza de la fortuna (The Dance of Fortune) (1944)
- Ritmo, sal y pimienta (Rhythm, Salt and Pepper) (1951)

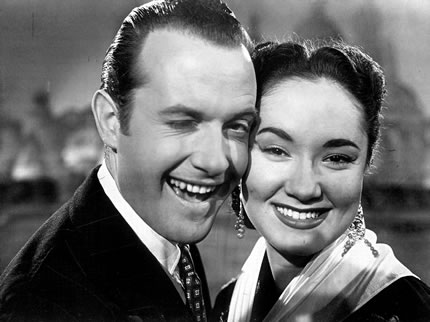
Lolita Torres and Ricardo Passano (Rhythm, Salt and Pepper)

- El mucamo de la niña (The Girl's Servant) (1951)
- La niña de fuego (The Fire Girl) (1952)
- La mejor del colegio (The Best Girl of College) (1953)
- La edad del amor (The Age of Love) (1954)

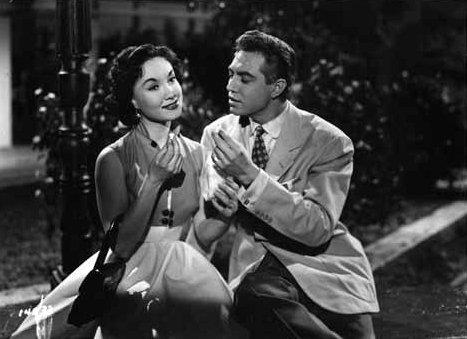
Lolita Torres and Alberto Dalbés (The Age of Love)

- Más pobre que una laucha (Poor as a Church Mouse,"very poor" – Spanish proverb)(1955)
- Un novio para Laura (A Bridegroom for Laura) (1955)
- Amor a primera vista (Love at First Sight) (1956)
- Novia para dos (A Bride for Two Men) (1956)
- La hermosa mentira (The Beautiful Lie) (1958)
- La maestra enamorada (The Teacher in Love) (1961)
- Cuarenta años de novios (Forty Years of Love) (1963)
- Ritmo nuevo, vieja ola (New Rhythm, old Wave) (1965)
- Pimienta (Pepper) (1966)
- Joven, viuda y estanciera (Young Girl, Widow and Landowner) (1970)
- Allá en el Norte (Somewhere in the North) (1973)

== Personal life ==
Torres was married twice. From her first marriage she had a son and from her second marriage she had four children, one of whom is Diego Torres.

== Bibliography ==
- Plazaola, Luis Trelles. South American Cinema: Dictionary of Film Makers. La Editorial, UPR, 1989.
