= Las furias =

1960 film

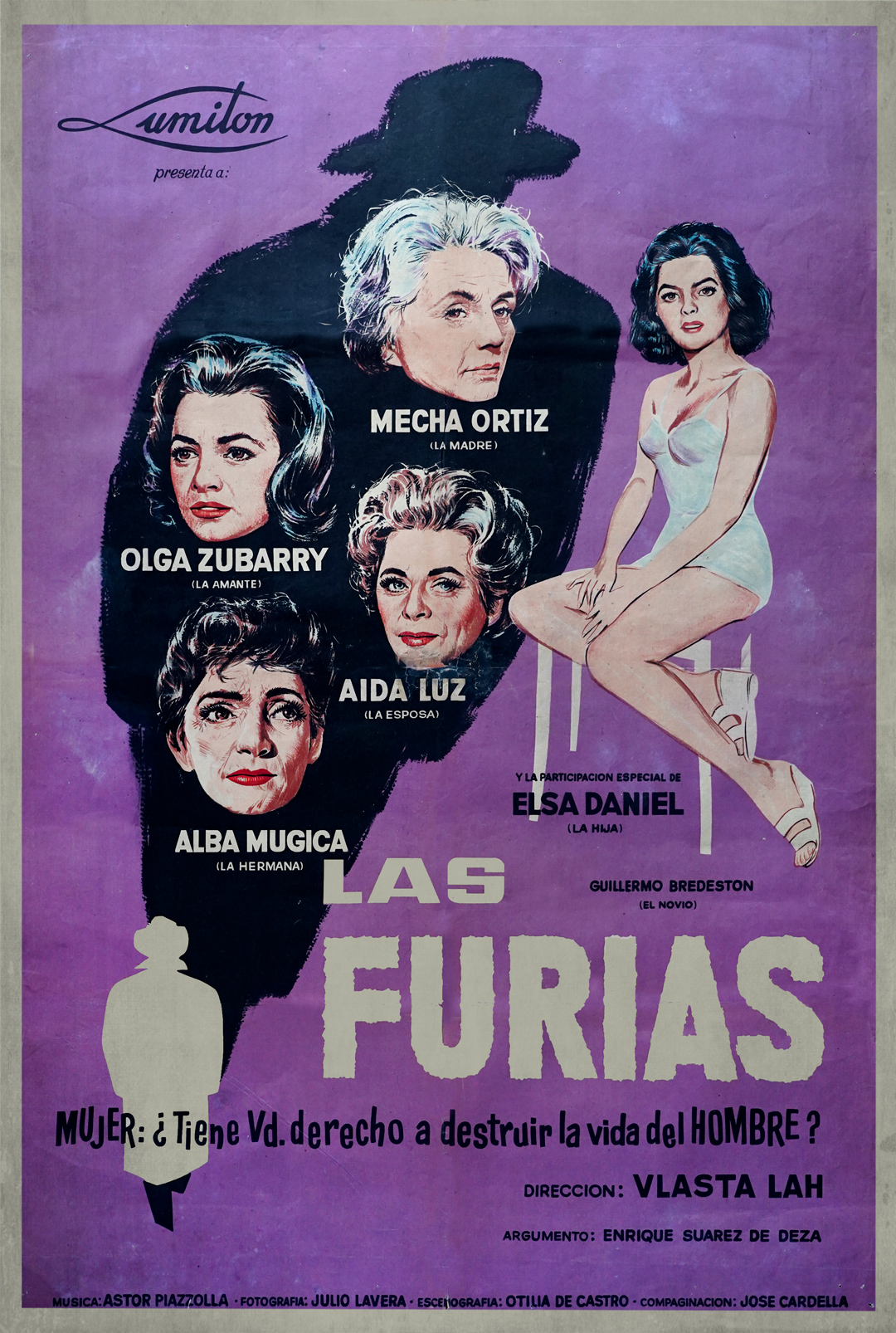
- Theatrical release poster.
- Directed by: Vlasta Lah
- Written by: Vlasta Lah
- Based on: Las furias by Enrique Suárez de Deza
- Produced by: Víctor E. Catrani; Oscar Mario Guevara; Justo Martínez
- Starring: Mecha Ortiz; Olga Zubarry; Aída Luz; Alba Mujica; Elsa Daniel
- Cinematography: Julio Lavera
- Edited by: José Cardella
- Music by: Ástor Piazzolla
- Production company: Lumiton
- Release date: 3 November 1960
- Running time: 83 minutes
- Country: Argentina
- Language: Spanish

Las furias (Spanish for "the furies") is a 1960 Argentine drama film directed by Vlasta Lah, based on the 1950 play of the same name by Enrique Suárez de Deza. The first Argentine sound film directed by a woman, it was the directorial debut for Lah, who became the only woman film director in 1960s Latin America. Its cast is almost exclusively female, starring Mecha Ortiz, Olga Zubarry, Aída Luz, Alba Mujica and Elsa Daniel as characters whose name are not presented, being introduced as "the Mother", "the Lover", "the Wife", "the Sister" and "the Daughter", respectively.

In 2022, it was included in the list of The 100 Greatest Films of Argentine Cinema at number 50, a poll organized by the specialized magazines La vida útil, Taipei and La tierra quema, which was presented at the Mar del Plata International Film Festival. Also in 2022, the film was included in Spanish magazine Fotogramas's list of the 20 best Argentine films of all time.

== Premise ==
Five women (mother, wife, lover, sister, and daughter) strive to exert control over a man, ultimately pushing him to his demise.

== Cast ==
- Mecha Ortiz as the Mother
- Olga Zubarry as the Lover
- Aída Luz as the Wife
- Alba Mujica as the Sister
- Elsa Daniel as the Daughter
- Guillermo Bredeston as the Boyfriend
