= By Killing =

- Directed by: Román Viñoly Barreto
- Written by: Rubén Deugenio
- Release date: 1965
- Running time: 90 minute
- Country: Argentina
- Language: Spanish

By Killing (Spanish: Orden de matar) is a 1965 Argentine film directed by Román Viñoly Barreto.

== Plot ==
Charlie, a young man from a wealthy family, kills a blind man in the subway in front of passengers, then escapes the station unnoticed. While speeding away, he fatally strikes a pursuing motorcycle police officer. The media expresses concern over the rising crime rates. Police officer Mauro Moreno investigates the blind man's death, discovering he was an informant for Judge Zani. Zani had steered Mauro away from a life of crime in his youth, guiding him toward joining the police force. Charlie brags about his murders at a cabaret run by Rosa. In exchange for Mabel's release, a young prostitute he had arrested, Rosa tips off Mauro. During a raid on the venue, Charlie kills one officer and escapes. Later, El Sueco, Nacho, and Charlie murder Judge Zany.

In the aftermath, Mauro undergoes a transformation, becoming more ruthless in his encounters with criminals, even when they cease resisting. The press criticizes the police for these deaths. La Mimito moves in with Mauro. Following a party, Nacho and Charlie rape and kill Clara, leading the media to demand action against crime. Mauro interrogates Nacho, securing his admission to the murders committed by El Sueco and Charlie. In a nighttime operation, Mauro intercepts contraband and kills Charlie, who had surrendered. The police trace El Sueco to Rosa's house, where Pascual, her recently released partner, is also present. Mauro, alerted to the situation, confronts and kills Pascual and El Sueco. The press protests against the police actions. Intentionally provoking his own demise, Mauro allows Nacho, a drug addict, to steal his gun and subsequently kill him.

== Cast ==
- Jorge Salcedo ... Mauro Moreno
- Nelly Meden ... Rosa
- José María Langlais ... El Sueco
- Graciela Borges ... Georgina
- Walter Vidarte ... Nacho
- Sergio Renán ... Charly
- Gilda Lousek ... Mabel
- Ambar La Fox ... Cantante
- Darío Vittori ... Sacerdote
- Bernardo Perrone ... Dr. Zani
- Mario Lozano ... Pascual
- Norberto Suárez ... Mincho
