= El Tío Disparate =

- Directed by: Palito Ortega
- Written by: Palito Ortega; Juan Carlos Mesa
- Produced by: Palito Ortega
- Starring: Palito Ortega
- Cinematography: Leonardo Rodríguez Solís
- Edited by: Jorge Gárate
- Music by: Palito Ortega
- Release date: February 23, 1978
- Running time: 110 minutes
- Country: Argentina
- Language: Spanish

El Tío Disparate (English language:The Silly Uncle) is a 1978 Argentine comedy musical film directed by Palito Ortega and written Juan Carlos Mesa. It stars Palito Ortega and Carlos Balá.

== Cast ==
- Palito Ortega
- Carlos Balá (as Carlitos Balá)
- Javier Portales
- Iris Láinez
- Daniel Miglioranza
- Gloria Raines
- José Díaz Lastra
- Horacio O'Connor
- Alicia Zanca
- Osvaldo Capiaggi
- Matilde Mur
- Gustavo Rey
