= Carmen Yazalde =

Portuguese Argentine model and actress

- Born: María do Carmo Ressurreição de Deus; 29 May 1950 (age 76); Guarda, Portugal
- Other names: Britt Nichols; Britt Nickols; Carmizè
- Citizenship: Portuguese; Argentine
- Occupations: Model; actress
- Spouse: Héctor Yazalde (m. 1973; died 1997)
- Children: 1

Carmen Yazalde (born 29 May 1950) whose birth name is Maria do Carmo Ressurreição de Deus, is a Portuguese Argentine model and actress, who had a career both in her native country and in Argentina.

== Biography ==
Yazalde grew up in a poor family of eight children, many of whom died in infancy. She took her first steps into show business as a folk dancer. At the age of 17, she was discovered by Vasco Morgado, owner of five theaters, making her debut at the Teatro Monumental.

Yazalde was Miss Fotogenia Portugal.1 She also had a brief career as an actress in exploitation films directed by Jess Franco, using the name Britt Nichols. She married Héctor Yazalde, an Argentine footballer who played for Independiente and Sporting Clube de Portugal. When he left European football, Yazalde settled permanently in Argentina in 1977, where she embarked on a career as a model, adopting the name Carmen Yazalde. She worked with other companions of the time such as Teté Coustarot, Patricia Miccio, Anamá Ferreyra, Teresa Calandra, Adriana Costantini and Mora Furtado.

In the 1980s, Yazalde made advertisements, such as the Mendinet edible products together with the journalist Juan Carlos Pérez Loizeau. In 1984, she participated in a cameo in the comedy Los reyes del sablazo, starring Alberto Olmedo, Jorge Porcel, Luisa Albinoni and Susana Traverso. In 1999, she participated in Todo por dos pesos, in a sketch playing Cigarette Jenga. In 2004 she hosted her beauty show Salud y belleza. In 2009 and 2012, she participated in the program Caiga Quien Caiga (CQC).

== Personal life ==
Carmen and Héctor Yazalde had one son, Gonzalo. After Héctor's death, Carmen has remained an occasional fixture in Argentine television and tabloid news.
