= Noemí Laserre =

Argentine actress

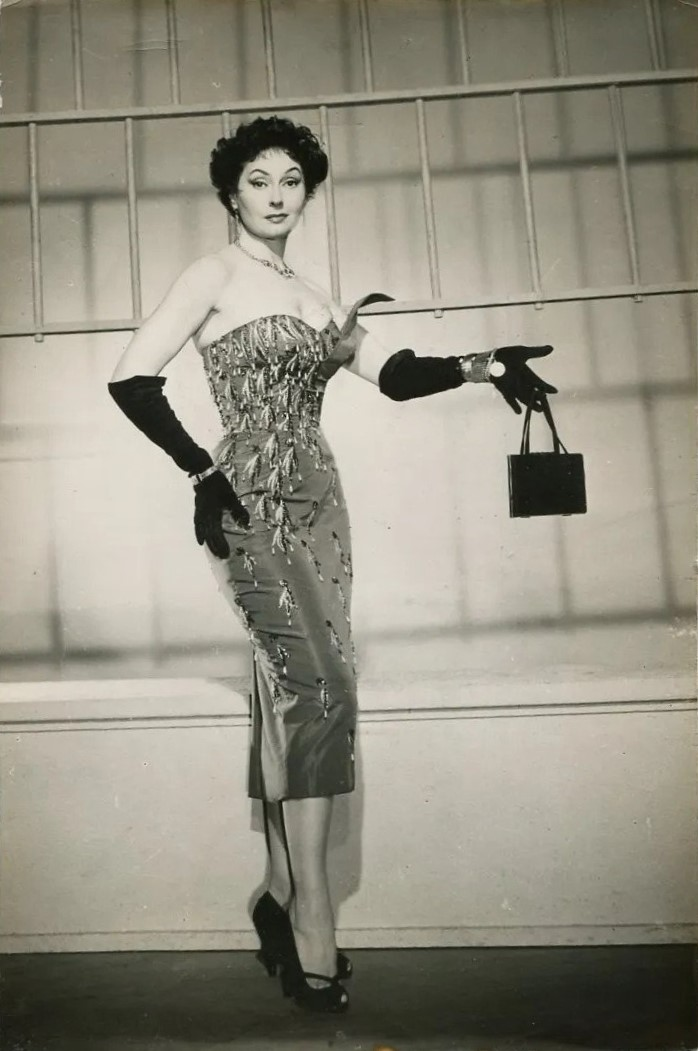
- Born: Josefa Sorrentino
- Died: April 7, 2001; Buenos Aires, Argentina
- Resting place: La Chacarita cemetery
- Occupation: Actress
- Spouse: Ricardo Lavié
- Children: Estela Molly

Noemí Laserre (died April 7, 2001) was an Argentine actress.
