= Joe Rígoli =

Argentine comedian and actor

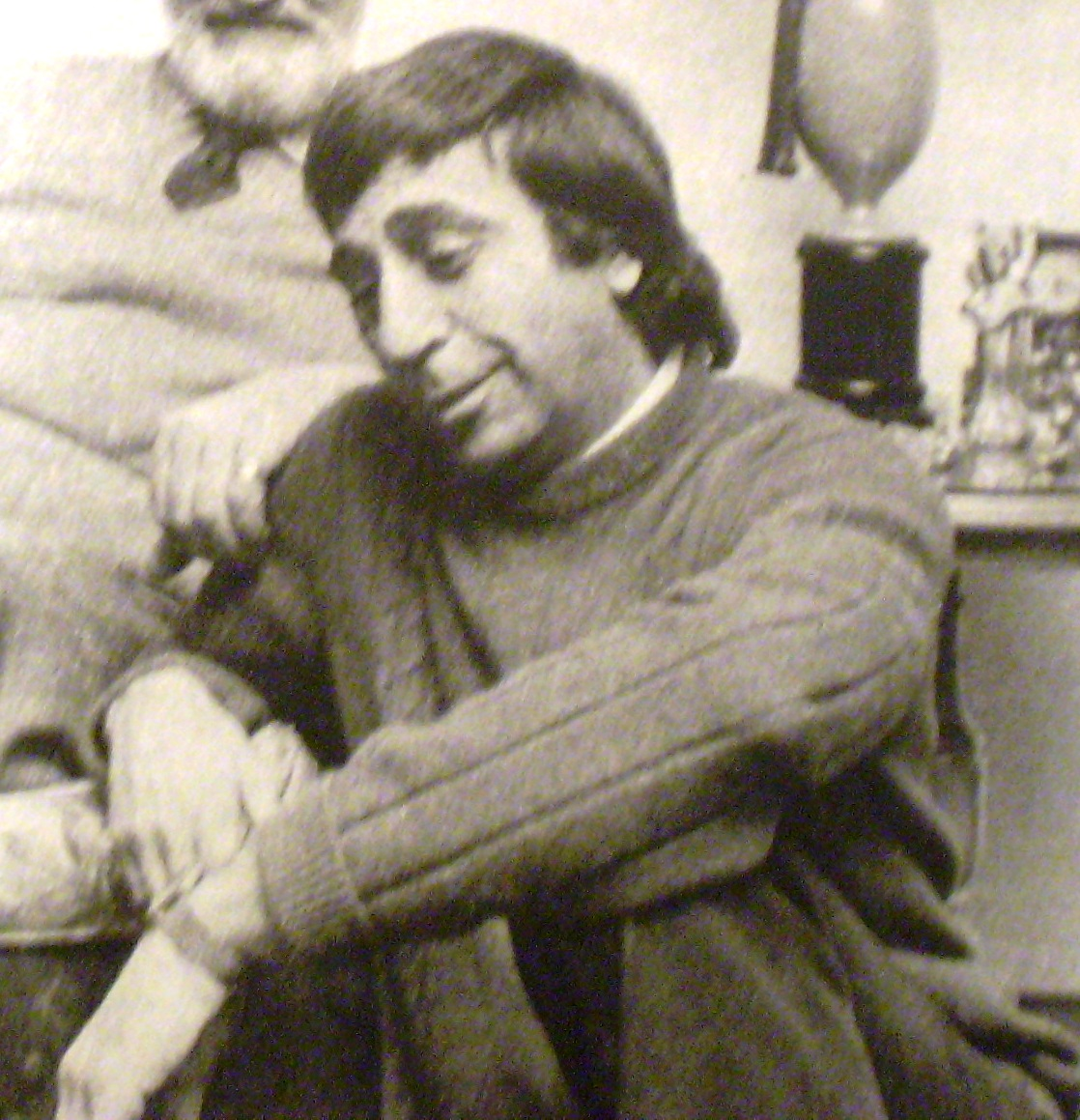
Rígoli in March 1968

Jorge Rígoli (Jorge Alberto Rípoli; 5 November 1936 – 27 January 2015) was an Argentine comedian and actor. He was known for starring in the popular Argentine animated series Un, dos, tres... responda otra vez. Rígoli was born in Buenos Aires, Argentina.

Rígoli died in Mar del Plata, Argentina from heart failure after being in a medically induced coma after having high blood pressure. He was 78 years old.

== Other websites ==
- Joe Rígoli at IMDb
