= Agustín Navarro (footballer) =

Uruguayan footballer (born 1997)

Personal information
- Full name: Agustín Emiliano Navarro Báez
- Date of birth: 26 April 1997 (age 29)
- Place of birth: Montevideo, Uruguay
- Height: 1.82 m (6 ft 0 in)
- Position: Forward

Team information
- Current team: Atenas

Youth career
- Ciclón del Cerrito
- Danubio

Senior career*
Years	Team	Apps	(Gls)
2016–2019	Danubio	9	(2)
2018	→ Sud América (loan)	11	(5)
2019–2020	Juventud	13	(0)
2020–2021	San Marcos	8	(0)
2022–2023	Sud América	22	(10)
2023–2024	Rampla Juniors	14	(4)
2024–2025	Sud América	25	(8)
2025–2026	Colón	20	(2)
2026–	Atenas	0	(0)
- * Club domestic league appearances and goals as of 22:09, 14 March 2026 (UTC)

Agustín Emiliano Navarro Báez (born 26 April 1997) is a Uruguayan footballer who plays as a forward for Atenas in the Uruguayan Segunda División.
