= Pepper and Red Pepper =

- Directed by: Carlos Rinaldi
- Release date: 1970
- Running time: 95 minute
- Country: Argentina
- Language: Spanish

Pepper and Red Pepper (Spanish: Pimienta y pimentón) is a 1970 Argentine film featuring Luis Sandrini and José Marrone.
