= Inda Ledesma =

Argentine actress

- Born: Margarita Rodríguez; March 29, 1926
- Died: January 26, 2010 (aged 83)
- Occupation: actor

Inda Ledesma (born Margarita Rodríguez; March 29, 1926 – January 26, 2010) was an Argentine stage, television, and cinema actress who also gained prominence as a theatre director and instructor.

== Life and work ==
Inda Ledesma was born in the Argentine town of Coronel Suárez to anarchist parents who fled persecution in Buenos Aires. In 1945 she debuted on the stage with a part in an Argentine National Comedy production of Molière's L'Avare. The following year, she was given her first role in the cinema of Argentina, in Pierre Chenal's El viaje sin regreso (Journey of No Return), by then she was known by her pseudonym, Inda Ledesma.

Ledesma continued to appear in the film, though in subsequent years she became prominent in the theatre, where she was trained by well-known local stage directors such as Antonio Cunill Cabanellas and Augusto Fernándes. She was named artistic director of the Teatro Argentino in 1964. She led productions of, among many other works, Mr Puntila and his Man Matti (Berthold Brecht), Man and Superman (George Bernard Shaw), and Death of a Salesman (Arthur Miller), as well as Israfel by Abelardo Castillo, and her modernized version of Euripides' Medea.

She starred with director Alejandro Doria in Jacobo Langsner's El tobogán for Alta comedia, a popular theatre showcase program on Argentine television during the early 1970s, and numerous similar programs. Her theatre appearances in subsequent years included that of Lady Macbeth in a 1973 Teatro General San Martín production, and works by Carlos Gorostiza, Luigi Pirandello, Anton Chekhov (Three Sisters), Tennessee Williams (The Glass Menagerie), and as Mrs. Patrick Campbell in a long-running production of Jerome Kilty's Dear Liar (with Ernesto Bianco as George Bernard Shaw).

Her prolific work as an actress and director twice earned her a Konex Award, the highest in the Argentine cultural realm, in 1981 and 1991. She continued to appear in film, including roles in Eduardo Mignogna's biopic, Flop (1990), and as Leonor Acevedo de Borges (writer Jorge Luis Borges's mother) in Un amor de Borges (2000).

Having retired for a number of years, Ledesma appeared in Pietro Silvestri's Ciudad invisible in 2008. She died from cardiopulmonary failure in a Buenos Aires nursing home two years later in 2010, aged 83. She was interred in the Actors' Pantheon at Chacarita Cemetery.

== Selected filmography ==
- The Three Musketeers (1946)
