= Estela Molly =

Argentine actress

- Born: Estela Noemí Nefimar Mayranx; 1943
- Died: August 13, 2017 (aged 73–74)
- Resting place: La Chacarita cemetery
- Occupation: Actress
- Parent(s): Ricardo Lavié; Noemí Laserre
- Relatives: Rodolfo Machado (uncle)

Estela Molly (1943 – August 13, 2017) was an Argentine actress.
