= Pimienta (film) =

- Directed by: Carlos Rinaldi
- Written by: Abel Santa Cruz
- Starring: Luis Sandrini; Patricia Scaliter; Amalia Scaliter
- Release date: 1966
- Running time: 133 minute
- Country: Argentina
- Language: Spanish

Pimienta is a 1966 Argentine film directed by Carlos Rinaldi.

== Cast ==
- Patricia Scaliter
- Amalia Scaliter
