= Professional Suspects =

De profesión, sospechosos
- Directed by: Enrique Carreras
- Written by: Julio Porter
- Starring: Pepe Marrone
- Release date: 1966
- Running time: 83 minute
- Country: Argentina
- Language: Spanish

De profesión, sospechosos (Professional Suspects) is a 1966 Argentine film. is a film co-produced between Argentina and Spain directed by Enrique Carreras on the script of Julio Porter. It was partially filmed in Cordoba, Argentina.

== Synopsis ==
Two friends suspected by the police of being linked to a crime try to prove their innocence.

== Cast ==
- Pepe Marrone ... Pepe Montes
- Antonio Prieto ... Joaquin Frias
- Graciela Borges ... Laura
- Nathan Finch ... Salustio
- Teresa Serrador ... Dolores
- Tono Andreu ... Santiago
- Dario Vittori ... Mr. Andrade
- Olga Hidalgo ... Mrs. Andrade
- Guido Gorgatti ... Journalist
- Adolfo Garcia Grau ... Stalker
- Ernesto Raquén ... Official
- Juanita Martinez ... Daughter of Andrade
- Hilda Viñas ... Chismosa 2
- Roberto Guthié
- Augusto Bonardo ... Camp TV
- Amalia Bernabé ... Chismosa 1
- Sunday Márquez
- Rafael Diserio
- Alicia Bonnet ... Justina
- Greta Williams
- Enrique San Miguel
