= Julio Porter =

Argentine screenwriter and film director

- Born: July 14, 1916; Buenos Aires
- Died: October 24, 1979 (aged 63); Mexico City
- Occupations: Screenwriter & Film director

Julio Porter (July 14, 1916 in Buenos Aires – October 24, 1979 in Mexico City) was an Argentine screenwriter and film director known as one of the most prolific screenwriters and film directors in the history of the Cinema of Argentina and a notable figure of the classical era of Argentine cinema.

He wrote the scripts for over 100 films between 1942 and his death. He directed 25 films between 1951 and 1979. His 1967 film Scandal in the Family was entered into the 5th Moscow International Film Festival.

== Filmography ==
=== Director ===
- De turno con la muerte (1951)
- Concierto para una lágrima (1955)
- La cigüeña dijo sí (1955)
- Canario rojo (1955)
- Marianela (1955)
- La sombra de Safo (1957)
- Historia de una carta (1957)
- Una gira A.T.M. (1958)
- La escuelita del relajo (1958)
- Al diablo con la música (1958)
- Una abuelita atómica (1958)
- Triunfa la pandilla (1959)
- La pandilla se divierte (1959)
- La pandilla en acción (1959)
- Aventuras de la pandilla (1959)
- Locos por la música (1962)
- Escándalo en la familia (1967)
- Coche cama alojamiento (1968)
- La casa de Madame Lulú (1968)
- Deliciosamente amoral (1969)
- ¡Qué noche de casamiento! (1969)
- El extraño del pelo largo (1970)
- Blum (1970)
- El Mundo es de los jóvenes (1970)
- La carpa del amor (1979)

=== Actor ===
- Rhythm, Salt and Pepper (1951)

=== Screenwriter ===
- The Fan (1951)
- Rebel Without a House (1960)
- Sonaron cuatro balazos (1964)
