= Julio Saraceni =

Argentine film director

Julio Saraceni (October 10, 1912 – October 12, 1998) was a prolific Argentine film director whose career in the Cinema of Argentina as a movie director spanned six decades. He was an important director during the classical era of Argentine cinema.

He was an aviator as a young man, but later found a career in film, where he debuted as a director in a 1937 short film, Fórmula secreta, in which he used his flying experience for the making of numerous scenes. He directed his first full-length title, Florencio Parravicini's comedy vehicle, Noches de carnaval, later that year. Saraceni married a member of the crew, Argentina Mori, and with her made some 60 films between 1938 and 1986, such as María Celeste (1944), Alma de bohemio (1949), La barra de la esquina (1950), and La mejor del colegio (1953). Saraceni was best known for directing comedies, and worked with many of the best known local figures in the genre, including Parravicini, Fidel Pintos, Niní Marshall, José Marrone. Carlos Balá, Lolita Torres and Pepe Biondi.

Saraceni directed pop musician Sandro's El deseo de vivir in 1972, and one of the series of Superagentes capers in 1986 (his last film). He dedicated himself to documentaries and made-for-television titles afterwards, and worked extensively for Channel 9 and Telefé. He suffered a stroke in 1988, however, and remained hemiplegic in later years. Saraceni lived half a block away from the site of the 1994 AMIA bombing, the worst terrorist attack in Argentine history, but survived. Dependent on an Argentine Institute of Cinematography pension, he lost his wife in 1996, and in 1998, Julio Saraceni died at age 86.

== Filmography ==
As director

- Fórmula secreta (1937)
- Noches de Carnaval (1938)
- La intrusa (1939)
- La importancia de ser ladrón (1944)
- Our Natacha (1944)
- Los tres mosqueteros (1946)
- María Celeste (1945)
- La caraba (1947)
- Cumbres de hidalguía (1947)
- El misterio del cuarto amarillo (1947)
- Nace la libertad (1949)
- Alma de bohemio (1949)
- La barra de la esquina (1950)
- Buenos Aires, mi tierra querida (1951)
- The Beautiful Brummel (1951)
- La última escuadrilla (1951)
- Bárbara atómica (1952)
- La mejor del colegio (1953)
- Por cuatro días locos (1953)
- The Age of Love (1954)
- Veraneo en Mar del Plata (1954)
- Los peores del barrio (1955)
- Más pobre que una laucha (1955)
- Un novio para Laura (1955)
- Catita es una dama (1956)
- El satélite chiflado (1956)
- Marta Ferrari (1956)
- Del cuplé al tango (1958)
- La hermosa mentira (1958)
- La maestra enamorada (1961)
- Cristóbal Colón en la Facultad de Medicina (1962)
- El mago de las finanzas (1962)
- Cuando calienta el sol (1963)
- Alias Flequillo (1963)
- Cleopatra Was Candida (1964)
- El gordo Villanueva (1964)
- Cuidado con las colas (1964)
- Esta noche mejor no (1965)
- Disloque en el presidio (1965)
- Muchachos impacientes (1966)
- Patapúfete (1967)
- El glotón (1967)
- Villa Cariño (1967)
- El novicio rebelde (1968)
- Joven, viuda y estanciera (1970)
- Vuelvo a vivir, vuelvo a cantar (1971)
- El deseo de vivir (1973)
- Allá en el Norte (1973)
- Rolando Rivas, taxista (1974)
- Carmiña: Su historia de amor (1975)
- Te necesito tanto, amor (1976)
- La Obertura (1977)
- Patolandia nuclear (1978)
- Alejandra, mon amour (1979)
- Buenos Aires tango (1982)
- Los superagentes contra los fantasmas (1982)

Screenplay

- La obertura (1977)
- Peluquería de señoras (1941)
- El susto que Pérez se llevó (1940)

Author de la idea

- Destino de un capricho (1972)

Ayudante de dirección

- Mamá Gloria (1941)

Diseñador de Producción

- La virgencita de madera (1937) dir. Sebastián M. Naón.
