= Abel Santa Cruz =

Argentine screenwriter

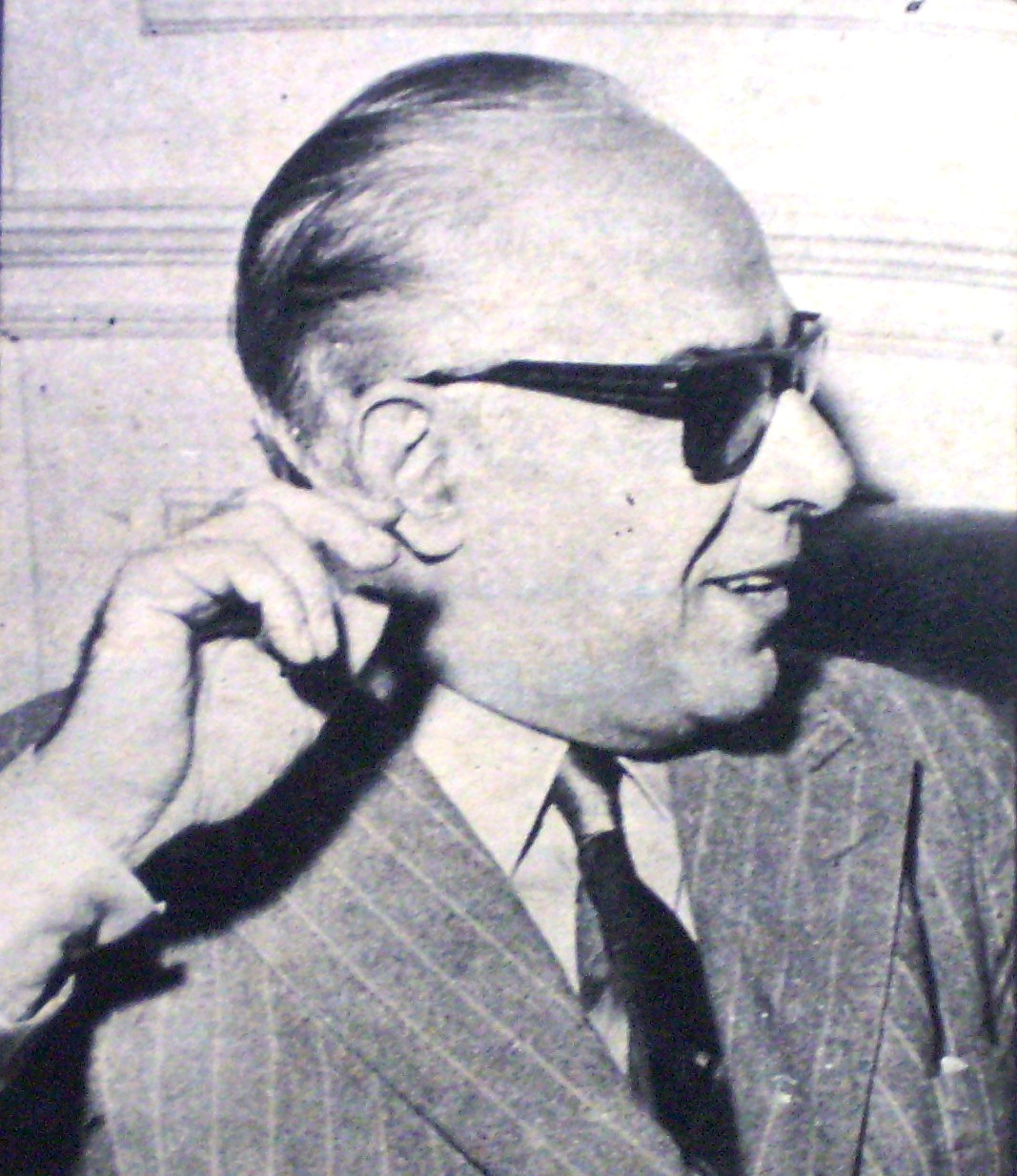
- Abel Santa Cruz in 1967
- Born: 1915; Barracas, Buenos Aires
- Died: February 4, 1995 (aged 79–80); Mar de Plata
- Occupations: Screenwriter, film producer and literary critic
- Spouse: Elcira Olivera Garcés

Abel Santa Cruz (1915 – February 4, 1995, in Buenos Aires) was an Argentine screenwriter who is credited for writing nearly 130 films spanning seven decades of Argentine cinema.

Santa Cruz first wrote the script for a film, Un Señor mucamo, in 1940 but it was not until ten years later in 1950 that his career had a breakthrough with his adaptation of the 1895 Oscar Wilde play, The Importance of Being Earnest in Al compás de tu mentira.

In 1963 he wrote the script to the gangster comedy Alias Flequillo. The following year he married the 21 year old Silvia Montanari. The marriage lasted a year and Montanari went on to a successful acting career.

Although Abel died in 1995 his work includes 10 different TV credits in over a decade since his death. In 1969 he wrote the script to the Fernando Ayala film El Profesor Hippie.

== Selected filmography ==
- The Beautiful Brummel (1951)
- The Age of Love (1954)
- Rebel Without a House (1960)
- Cleopatra Was Candida (1964)
- Había una vez un circo (1972)
- Destino de un capricho (1972)
