= Fernando Siro =

Argentine actor and film director (1931–2006)

- Born: October 5, 1931; Villa Ballester, Argentina
- Died: September 4, 2006 (aged 74); Buenos Aires
- Occupations: Actor, Director, Screenwriter

Fernando Siro (October 5, 1931 – September 4, 2006) was an Argentine radio, theatre and film actor, director and screenwriter.

== Life and work ==
Born Francisco Ángel Luksich in Villa Ballester, he developed an early interest in acting and in 1950 was given his first Argentine cinema role in El otro yo de Marcela, directed by Alberto de Zavalía. His deep voice and keen sense of timing earned him numerous radio drama roles during the 1950s, and later in the Channel 7 telenovela series, La tarde de Palmolive.

He earned renown for his 1965 screen adaptation of Dalmiro Sáenz's El pecado necesario. His film version of this work, Nadie oyó gritar a Cecilio Fuentes, marked Siro's directorial debut and earned hima Silver Seashell at the San Sebastián International Film Festival. He remained in Spain until 1970, and starred as Julio Colón, the protagonist in a top-rated sitcom, La familia Colón.

Returning to Argentina, he appeared in Fernando Ayala's adaptation of historian Félix Luna's historical drama, Argentino hasta la muerte (1971), and directed the picaresque comedy Autocine mon amour (1972). He directed numerous comedies and musical films, which became popular in Argentina during the troubled 1970s, and would star in a number of these, notably with Jorge Porcel in Te rompo el rating (1981), and in Alejandro Azzano's tragicomic Venido a menos (1981).

Siro was also active in the theatre, playing over 60 roles in his career, notably in Leo Tolstoi's Anna Karenina, Jean-Paul Sartre's The Respectful Prostitute, Tennessee Williams' A Streetcar Named Desire, Arthur Miller's A View From the Bridge, and Ken Ludwig's Lend Me a Tenor.

Among his notable roles in later years were for director Fernando Solanas in Sur (1987) and El Viaje (1992), in El mundo de Gasalla (Antonio Gasalla's television comedy skit series of the early 1990s), and in Orlando Posse's romantic comedy, Apariencias (2000). His last work as director was the regionalist Sapucay, mi pueblo (1997).

Siro and his wife and frequent co-star, Elena Cruz, were politically conservative. Their decision to join a small rally on March 24, 2001, in support of the former dictator in power during the height of the genocide, General Jorge Videla, led to their expulsion from the Argentine Actors Association.

He died of cancer on September 4, 2006, at age 74.

== Filmography ==
=== As actor ===
- Juan Mondiola (1950)
- El Otro yo de Marcela (1950)
- Suburb (1951)
- La Calle junto à la luna (1951)
- Los Problemas de papá (1954)
- La Calle del pecado (1954)
- Crisol de hombres (1954)
- Barrio Gris (1954)
- Sucedió en Buenos Aires (1954)
- Pájaros de cristal (1955) .... Germán
- Canario rojo (1955)
- Un Tranvía llamado Deseo (1956, TV Movie) .... Stanley Kowalski
- Del cuplé al tango (1958)
- Bajo un mismo rostro (1962) .... Voice of Jorge Mistral
- Aquí a las seis (1962, TV Series)
- María M. (1964)
- Cuidado con las colas (1964)
- El Club del clan (1964)
- Los Hipócritas (1965)
- Nadie oyó gritar a Cecilio Fuentes (1965)
- Las Chicas (1965, TV Series) .... (guest)
- Esta noche mejor no (1965)
- Necesito una madre (1966)
- Algo caliente bajo la piel (1966, TV Series)
- La Familia Colón (1967, TV Series) .... Colón
- La Muchacha del cuerpo de oro (1967) .... Norberto
- Amor y un poco más (1968)
- 0597 da ocupado (1968, TV Series)
- Amor libre (1969)
- El Salame (1969)
- ¡Qué noche de casamiento! (1969)
- Esta noche... miedo (1970, TV Series)
- Argentino hasta la muerte (1971)
- Y qué patatín y qué patatán (1971)
- Autocine mon amour (1972)
- El Mundo que inventamos (1973)
- Este loco, loco, Buenos Aires (1973)
- Siempre fuimos compañeros (1973)
- Los Días que me diste (1975)
- El Rey de los exhortos (1979) .... Ing. Julio Castromil
- La Canción de Buenos Aires (1980)
- Comandos azules (1980)
- Días de ilusión (1980)
- Tiro al aire (1980)
- Fabián 2 Mariana 0 (1980, TV Series)
- Te rompo el rating (1981) .... Alfredo Falcón
- Abierto día y noche (1981)
- Buenos Aires tango (1982)
- Venido a menos (1984) .... Alfredo
- Las Aventuras de Tremendo (1986)
- Sur (1988)
- Paraíso relax (1988)
- Extermineitors II: La venganza del dragón (1990) .... Police Chief
- El Viaje (1992) .... Federico
- ¿Dónde estás amor de mi vida que no te puedo encontrar? (1992) .... Octavio Luz
- Perdido por perdido (1993) .... Octavio Del Buono
- Los Ángeles no lloran (1996, TV Series) .... Ignacio Linares
- Sapucay, mi pueblo (1997)
- Un Argentino en New York (1998) .... Raúl
- El Humor de Café Fashion (1999, TV Series) .... Host
- Apariencias (2000) .... Orlando Posse
- Buenos Aires plateada (2000) .... (final film role)

=== As director ===
- Nadie oyó gritar a Cecilio Fuentes (1965)
- Necesito una madre (1966)
- Lo prohibido está de moda (1968)
- Amor libre (1969)
- El Salame (1969)
- Me enamoré sin darme cuenta (1972)
- Autocine mon amour (1972)
- El Mundo que inventamos (1973)
- Este loco, loco, Buenos Aires (1973)
- Siempre fuimos compañeros (1973)
- En el gran circo (1974)
- Contigo y aquí (1974)
- Los Días que me diste (1975)
- Allá donde muere el viento (1976)
- La Nueva cigarra (1977)
- El Divorcio está de moda - de común acuerdo (1978)
- Los Éxitos del amor (1979)
- La Canción de Buenos Aires (1980)
- Las Vacaciones del amor (1981)
- Seis pasajes al infierno (1981)
- Esto es vida (1982)
- Las Colegialas (1986)
- Alta comedia (1991, TV Series, unknown episodes)
- Cosecharás tu siembra (1991, TV Series)
- Sapucay, mi pueblo (1997)

=== As screenwriter ===
- Lo prohibido está de moda (1968)
- Amor libre (1969)
- El Salame (1969)
- Vuelvo a vivir, vuelvo a cantar (1971)
- La Nueva cigarra (1977)
- La Carpa del amor (1979)
- Donde duermen dos... duermen tres (1979)
- La Canción de Buenos Aires (1980)
- Las Vacaciones del amor (1981)
- ¿Los piolas no se casan? (1981)
