= Bajó un ángel del cielo =

1942 film

- Directed by: Luis César Amadori
- Written by: Luis César Amadori
- Starring: Zully Moreno; Francisco Álvarez; Felisa Mary; Pedro Quartucci
- Cinematography: Alberto Etchebehere
- Edited by: Jorge Gárate
- Music by: Mario Maurano
- Production company: Argentina Sono Film
- Distributed by: Argentina Sono Film
- Release date: 11 August 1942
- Running time: 80 minutes
- Country: Argentina
- Language: Spanish

Bajó un ángel del cielo (An Angel Came Down from Heaven) is a 1942 Argentine melodrama film of the Golden Age of Argentine cinema, directed and written by Luis Cesar Amadori and starring Zully Moreno and Francisco Álvarez. It is based on the play Bichon by Jean de Létraz and Víctor Bouchet.

== Cast ==
- Zully Moreno
- Francisco Álvarez
- Felisa Mary
- Pedro Quartucci
- Maurice Jouvet
- Gladys Rizza
- Julio Renato
- Lola Márquez
- José Olivero
- Manuel Alcón
- Adolfo Linvel
- Warly Ceriani
- León Cerri
- Osvaldo Mariani
- Haydeé Alva
- Vicente Rossi
- Fernando Campos
