= Edgardo Togni =

Argentine film producer

Edgardo Togni was an Argentine film producer and director who worked in his country from the 1940s to the 1960s and founded the Directores Argentinos Cinematográficos.

== Filmography ==
=== Production Assistant ===
- La verdadera victoria (1944)
- Mosquita muerta (1946)
- Navidad de los pobres (1947)
- El tango vuelve a París (1948)
- Un tropezón cualquiera da en la vida (1949)
- Mujeres que bailan (1949)
- Juan Globo (1949)
- Toscanito y los detectives (1950)

=== Production Manager ===
- Vivir un instante (1951)

=== Assistant Director ===
- Palermo (1937)
- Con el dedo en el gatillo (1940)
- La mentirosa (1942)

=== Production Manager ===
- Celos (1946)
- Una mujer sin cabeza (1947)
- La vendedora de fantasías (1950)

=== Director's Assistant ===
- Confesión (1940)
- Historia de una noche (1941)
- Los ojos más lindos del mundo (1943)
- Pasaporte a Río (1948)

=== Screenwriter ===
- Argentina tierra pródiga (1963)

=== Director ===
- Su seguro servidor (1954)
- Los maridos de mamá (1956)
- Hay que bañar al nene (1958)
- Comahue (1963)
- Argentina tierra pródiga (1963)
