= Madame Sans-Gêne (1945 film) =

1945 film

- Directed by: Luis César Amadori
- Written by: Conrado Nalé Roxlo
- Based on: Madame Sans-Gêne by Victorien Sardou and Émile Moreau
- Starring: Niní Marshall; Eduardo Cuitiño; Herminia Franco
- Cinematography: Alberto Etchebehere; Roque Giaccovino
- Edited by: Jorge Gárate
- Music by: Mario Maurano
- Production company: Argentina Sono Film
- Distributed by: Argentina Sono Film
- Release date: 28 November 1945
- Running time: 90 minutes
- Country: Argentina
- Language: Spanish

Madame Sans-Gêne is a 1945 Argentine historical comedy film of the classical era of Argentine cinema, directed by Luis César Amadori and starring Niní Marshall, Eduardo Cuitiño and Herminia Franco. It is based on the 1893 play Madame Sans-Gêne by Victorien Sardou and Émile Moreau. The film's sets were designed by the art director Hans Jacoby.

== Cast ==
- Niní Marshall as Madame Sans-Gêne
- Eduardo Cuitiño as Napoleon
- Herminia Franco as Elisa Bonaparte, princesa de Piombino
- Homero Cárpena as Fouchet, duque de Otranto
- Luis Otero as Mariscal Le Fevre
- Delfy de Ortega as Carolina Bonaparte, princesa de Nápoles
- Warly Ceriani as Fontán
- Tato de Serra
- César Blasco
- Mario Faig
- Adolfo Linvel
- José Maurer
- Adrián Cuneo
- Joaquín Petrocino
- Julio Renato

== Bibliography ==
- Couret, Nilo. Mock Classicism: Latin American Film Comedy, 1930–1960. University of California Press, 2018.
- Klossner, Michael. The Europe of 1500-1815 on Film and Television: A Worldwide Filmography of Over 2550 Works, 1895 Through 2000. McFarland & Company, 2002.
