= Dos tipos con suerte =

- Directed by: Miguel Morayta
- Written by: Miguel Morayta; Rodolfo M. Taboada; Bernardo Verbitsky
- Starring: Miguel Aceves Mejía; Ana Casares
- Cinematography: Alberto Etchebehere
- Edited by: Jorge Gárate
- Music by: Tito Ribero
- Distributed by: Argentina Sono Film
- Release date: 24 March 1960
- Running time: 85 minutes
- Country: Argentina
- Language: Spanish

Dos tipos con suerte is a 1960 Argentine musical comedy film directed by Miguel Morayta. It stars Miguel Aceves Mejía and Ana Casares. Production design for the film was by Emilio Rodríguez Mentasti.

== Cast ==
- Miguel Aceves Mejía
- Ana Casares
- Mabel Karr
- Francisco Álvarez
- Mario Amaya
- Alberto Argibay
- Nelly Beltrán
