= Huella =

- Directed by: Luis Moglia Barth
- Written by: Hugo Mac Dougall, Homero Manzi
- Cinematography: Hugo Chiesa, Antonio Merayo
- Edited by: Jorge Gárate
- Music by: Mario Maurano
- Release date: 24 January 1940
- Country: Argentina
- Language: Spanish

Huella is a 1940 Argentine film directed by Luis Moglia Barth during the Golden Age of Argentine cinema.

== Cast ==
- Enrique Muiño as Mariano Funes
- Fernando Ochoa
- Malisa Zini as Merceditas Ruiz
- Daniel Belluscio as Goyo
- Emilio Gola
- Ada Cornaro
- José Otal
- Orestes Caviglia as Nazareno Miranda
- Pablo Cumo
- Percival Murray
- Héctor Méndez
- Eduardo Otero
- Froilán Varela
