= Zully Moreno =

Argentine actress

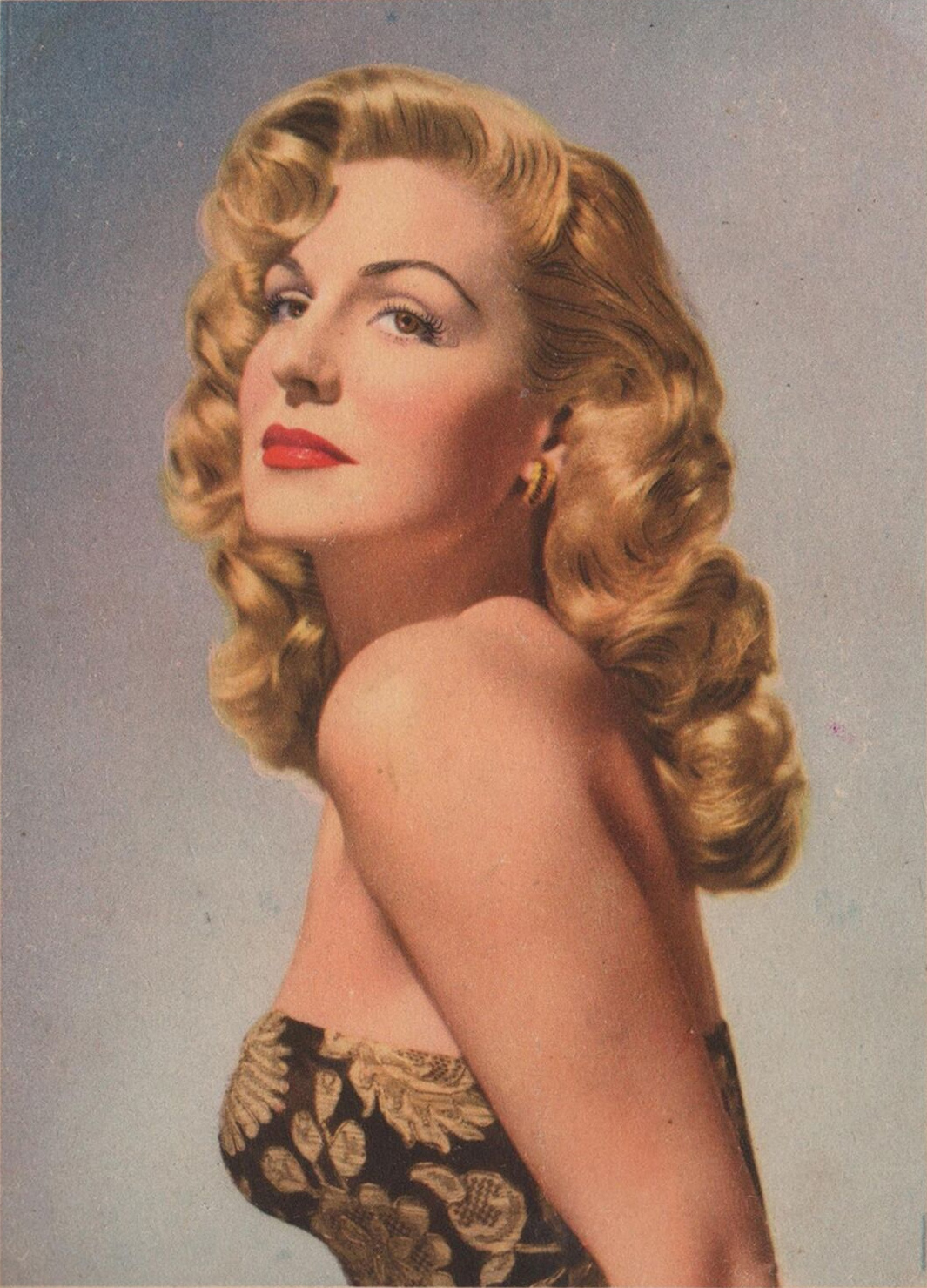
- Hand-colored portrait of Zully Moreno, ca. 1954
- Born: Zulema Esther González Borbón; 17 October 1920; Villa Ballester, Buenos Aires Province, Argentina
- Died: 25 December 1999 (aged 79); Buenos Aires Province, Argentina
- Resting place: La Recoleta Cemetery
- Years active: 1938–1960
- Spouse: Luis Cesar Amadori (1947–19??)
- Children: 1

Zulema Esther González Borbón, better known as Zully Moreno (October 17, 1920 in Villa Ballester, Buenos Aires – December 25, 1999 in Buenos Aires), was an Argentine film actress during the Golden Age of Argentine cinema of the 1940s and 1950s. She appeared in more than 70 movies, earning best actress awards from the Argentine Academy of Motion Picture Arts and Sciences and the Spanish Cinema Writers Circle.

== Biography ==
Zulema Esther González Borbón was born on 17 October 1920 in the town of Villa Ballester, part of the General San Martín Partido in Buenos Aires Province, Argentina. She dreamed of becoming an actress, but went to work as a seamstress at a young age due to financial hardship, after her father's death when she was ten years old, followed by her elder brother's death when she was fourteen years old.

She made many visits to the theaters in search of parts, and in 1938, answering a notice for extras, she was hired for a minor role in Cándida, under the direction of Luis Bayon Herrera and starring Niní Marshall. She then had a string of films, including Bartolo tenía una flauta (1939), Azahares rojos (1940), De México llegó el amor (1940) and Orquesta de señoritas (1941), in which she played minor roles. During the filming of Orquesta de señoritas she met Luis Cesar Amadori, who would become her husband, several years later.

Her first starring role was in the film En el último piso (1942), which led to a role opposite Mirtha Legrand in Su hermana menor. She was launched to stardom with Stella (1943), directed by Benito Perojo. The Hollywood-style, big budget production, with haute couture costumes gave her a glamour like few other actresses had at the time and led to a style that became known as "cine de los teléfonos blancos" (cinema of the white telephone). Stella was followed with roles alongside some of Argentina's biggest stars, including: Pedro López Lagar in both Apasionadamente (1944) and Celos (1946); Angel Magaña in Nunca te diré adiós (1947); and Arturo de Córdova in Dios se lo pague (1948). Dios se lo pague was directed by Luis Cesar Amadori, who Moreno had married in 1947 and was one of the first foreign films ever nominated for an Academy Award. The film debuted on 16 March 1948 in Mar del Plata, at the inaugural Argentine Film Festival, and Moreno won best actress from the Argentine Academy of Motion Picture Arts and Sciences.

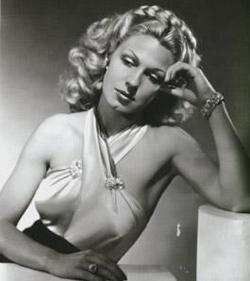
Zully Moreno ca. 1950

Moreno's marriage marked a change in the type roles that she played and her movement into diva status. Prior to that time, from 1939 to 1945, her roles were primarily melodramatic comedies and portrayed modern, urban women. These films reflect the changing role of women after the Second World War, where women are not confined solely to home and children, but part of the world, making decisions. Innocent, but not naïve, worldly, but not too worldly and introducing the first inklings that romance could be an emotional and sexual attraction for women rather than love simply being a spiritual passive feminine duty. In the contrary, after her marriage, Moreno became the embodiment of elegance, luxury, and glamour. Most of her films were pure melodrama and almost always there was a scene of an evening-dress clad woman entering a casino, or theater in which a long-camera watched as her coat was removed and unveiled the beautiful woman beneath.

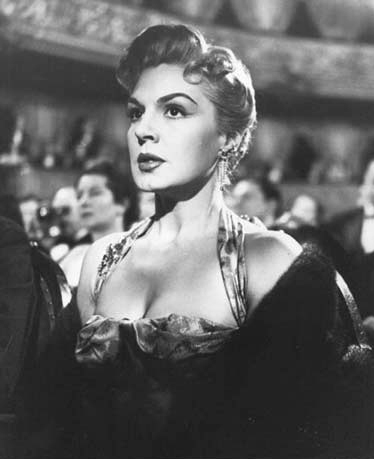
Zully Moreno at the theater ca. 1958

Though she often worked with her husband, Moreno also worked with some of Argentina's biggest directors. She was directed by Mario Soffici in La gata (1947) and by Carlos Hugo Christensen in La trampa (1949). Her husband directed her in Nacha Regules (1950) and María Montecristo (1951) and in Cosas de mujer (1951), she was directed by Carlos Schlieper. In La mujer de las camelias (1952) she was directed by Ernesto Arancibia but also met Horace Lannes, who going-forward would be her preferred designer. "Camelias" won Moreno her second Best Actress award from the Argentine Academy of Motion Picture Arts and Sciences in 1953 and the inaugural Best Foreign Film award at the 1955 Golden Globes from the Hollywood Foreign Press Association. Her last film in Argentina was Amor prohibido, made under the direction of her husband, filmed in 1955, but it was not released until 1958.

In 1955, when Juan Perón's government was overthrown by the Revolución Libertadora, a coup d'état, Amadori was arrested and tortured. Upon his release from prison, he and Moreno fled to Spain. She continued working in Spain, filming Madrugada (1957) with director Antonio Roman, for which she won the Círculo de Escritores Cinematográficos (CEC) (Cinema Writers Circle) award for Best Actress. That same year, at the Film Festival San Sebastian, Moreno received the award which typified her screen persona, with a certificate honoring her as most elegant actress. Her next film was La noche y el alba (1959) directed by José María Forqué, followed by Una gran señora (1959) and Un trono para Cristy (1960), both directed by her husband, Amadori.

After the death of Amadori in 1977, she returned permanently to Argentina and led the Teatro Maipo and chaired the production of Argentina Sono Film briefly, but then turned away from the media and became reclusive as her Alzheimer's advanced.

== Family life ==
Moreno married Luis Cesar Amadori in 1947 and they had one son, Luis. During their years of exile in Spain, the family shared living spaces with Alberto Closas, his wife Marisa, and their family, moving back and forth between properties in Madrid and Alicante. In 1966, she began returning to Argentina incognito, wanting her son to know his heritage. After years of visiting, in 1970, she purchased an apartment in Buenos Aires, on Avenida Del Libertador.

She died on 25 December, 1999 in Buenos Aires, a victim of Alzheimer's disease. She was buried in the Pantheon of Actors at Chacarita Cemetery.

== Awards ==
- 1946 Premios Sur Award for Best Actress for Celos
- 1953 Premios Sur Award for Best Actress for La mujer de las camelias

== Filmography ==
- Cándida (1939)
- Bartolo tenía una flauta (1939)
- Azahares rojos (1940)
- De México llegó el amor (1940)
- By the Light of a Star (1941)
- Girls Orchestra (1941)
- Los martes, orquídeas (1941)
- Papá tiene novia (1941)
- El Profesor Cero (1942)
- En el último piso (1942)
- El Pijama de Adán (1942)
- Fantasmas en Buenos Aires (1942)
- Bajó un ángel del Cielo (1942)
- Historia de Crímenes (1942)
- Su hermana menor (1943)
- Stella (1943)
- Apasionadamente (1944)
- Two Angels and a Sinner (1945)
- Cristina (1946)
- Celos (1946)
- Nunca te diré adiós (1947)
- La Gata (1947)
- Dios se lo pague (1948)
- La Trampa (1949)
- Nacha Regules (1950)
- Pecado (1950)
- María Montecristo (1951)
- Tierra baja (1951)
- The Unwanted (1951)
- Cosas de Mujer (1951)
- Me casé con una estrella (1951)
- The Lady of the Camellias (1953))
- La Dama del Mar (1954)
- La Calle del Pecado (1954)
- El barro humano (1955)
- El amor nunca muere (1955)
- Amor prohibido (1955)
- Madrugada (1957)
- Night and Dawn (1958)
- La Noche y el Alba (1959)
- Una Gran Señora (1959)
- Un Trono para Cristy (1960)
