= Victoria Cuenca =

Victoria Cuenca (1928)

Victoria Cuenca (fl. 1928–1946) was an Argentine film actress during Argentina's Golden Age of cinema, as well as a theatre actress and a vedette.

== Biography ==
Victoria Cuenca was born in Buenos Aires. Together with her sister, Ángela Cuenca, she starred in the Buenos Aires variety stage shows in numerous theater companies led by leading figures in Argentina such as Tita Merello, Perla Mary, Héctor Quintanilla, and José Otal. She starred at the Maipo Theater where she worked extensively with Ivo Pelay, Pepe Arias, and Marcos Caplán-Pepita Muñoz. Her theater credits span the period of 1928 till 1946.

Already in the 1940s, Cuenca was part of the Argentine cinema era with roles as a supporting actress. Her first film role was in 1940 in the comedy, Educating Niní, along with Niní Marshall, which also included the film debuts of Mirtha Legrand and Silvia Legrand. She performed with Pepe Arias in Napoleon (1941), and also had roles in Orquesta de señoritas (1941) and Historia de una noche (1941).

Cuenca died in Buenos Aires.

== Filmography ==
- 1940: Educating Niní.
- 1941: Girls Orchestra.
- 1941: Historia de una noche.
- 1941: Napoleón.

== Theatre ==
- 1928: Bertoldo, Bertoldino y el otro.
- 1928: Juventud, divino tesoro.
- 1928: Estrellas de fuego.
- 1928: Vértigo.
- 1933: Yo me quiero divorciar.
- 1934: Quisiera que tu me odiaras .
- 1935: La ley de la villa .
- 1938: Good Bye, ¡Obelisco!
- 1938: La voz del Maipo (estación de onda corta).
- 1938: Il barbiere de La Plata.
- 1940: La gran vida de Pepe Arias.
- 1944: ¡Spaghetti House!, at Teatro Apolo
- 1945: ¡Los Muchachos Quieren Volver!.
- 1945: Está… Tutto Listo!, at Teatro El Nacional.
- 1945: La futura presidencia: El pueblo quiere saber de lo que se trata .
- 1946: Hay ensueños que son mulas!.
- 1946: ¡Que frío andar sin saco!
