= Legrand sisters =

The Legrand sisters may refer to twin Argentine actresses both born February 23, 1927:

- Mirtha Legrand born Rosa María Juana Martínez Suárez
- Silvia Legrand born Rosa Aurelia Martínez Suárez
