= Thirst (1960 film) =

- Directed by: Lucas Demare
- Written by: Emilio Canda; Antonio Cuevas; Lucas Demare; Augusto Roa Bastos (novel)
- Produced by: Adolfo Cabrera
- Cinematography: Manuel Merino; Alberto Etchebehere
- Edited by: Jorge Gárate; Gori Muñoz
- Music by: Lucio Demare; Manuel Parada
- Production companies: Argentina Sono Film; Suevia Films
- Distributed by: Argentina Sono Film; Iris Films
- Release date: 27 April 1961
- Running time: 91 minutes
- Countries: Argentina; Spain
- Language: Spanish

Thirst (Spanish: La sed) aka Hijo de Hombre, aka Choferes del Chaco is a 1960 Argentine-Spanish war film directed by Lucas Demare. It is set during the Chaco War (1932–1935) between Bolivia and Paraguay, sometimes known as the "War of the Thirst". The script is based on a chapter of Augusto Roa Bastos novel Hijo de Hombre. It was made as a co-production between Argentina Sono Film and the Spanish company Suevia Films.

== Cast ==
- Vicente Ariño
- Susy Castell
- Lucas Demare
- Carlos Dorrego
- Carlos Estrada
- Dora Ferreiro
- Francisco Rabal
- Manuel Rosón
- José María Salort
- Sergio Vandes
- Jorge Villalba
- Olga Zubarry

== Production ==
The entire film was shot in Termas de Río Hondo, in the province of Santiago del Estero, in an area of northern Argentina where there was a spa where the actors recovered from the rigors of the shooting, which took place in very hot weather.

== Awards ==
At the 9th San Sebastian International Film Festival, which took place from June 8 to 17, 1961, it received the Perla del Cantábrico Award for Best Spanish-Speaking Film, while Olga Zubarry received the Award for Best Spanish-Speaking Actress.

== Bibliography ==
- Helene C. Weldt-Basson. Postmodernism's Role in Latin American Literature: The Life and Work of Augusto Roa Bastos. Springer, 2010.
