= Two Angels and a Sinner =

1945 film

- Directed by: Luis César Amadori
- Written by: Carlos A. Olivari; Sixto Pondal Ríos
- Starring: Zully Moreno; Pedro López Lagar; Fanny Navarro; Florindo Ferrario
- Cinematography: Alberto Etchebehere
- Edited by: Jorge Gárate
- Music by: Juan Ehlert
- Production company: Argentina Sono Film
- Distributed by: Argentina Sono Film
- Release date: 1945
- Running time: 85 minutes
- Country: Argentina
- Language: Spanish

Two Angels and a Sinner (Spanish: Dos ángeles y un pecador) is a 1945 Argentine fantasy comedy drama film of the classical era of Argentine cinema, directed by Luis César Amadori and starring Zully Moreno, Pedro López Lagar and Fanny Navarro. The film's sets were designed by art director Mario Vanarelli.

== Cast ==
- Zully Moreno
- Pedro López Lagar
- Fanny Navarro
- Florindo Ferrario
- Liana Moabro
- Miriam Sucre
- Adriana Alcock
- José A. Paonessa
- Roberto Bordoni
- Nora Loubet
- Margarita Burke
- Leda Urbi
- Warly Ceriani
