= La Verdadera victoria =

- Directed by: Carlos F. Borcosque
- Written by: Héctor Canziani; Arturo Cerretani
- Produced by: Edgardo Togni
- Starring: Pedro López Lagar
- Cinematography: Alberto Etchebehere
- Edited by: Jorge Gárate
- Music by: Alejandro Gutiérrez del Barrio; Mario Maurano
- Release date: March 7, 1944
- Country: Argentina
- Language: Spanish

La Verdadera victoria (English: Passionately) is a 1944 Argentine romantic comedy film of the classical era of Argentine cinema, directed by Carlos F. Borcosque and starring Pedro López Lagar. Music by Franz Schubert was used in the film together with compositions by Alejandro Gutiérrez del Barrio.

== Cast ==
- Roberto Airaldi
- Nélida Bilbao
- Carlos Castro
- Enrique Chaico
- Pedro López Lagar
- José Maurer... Fisher
