= Educating Niní =

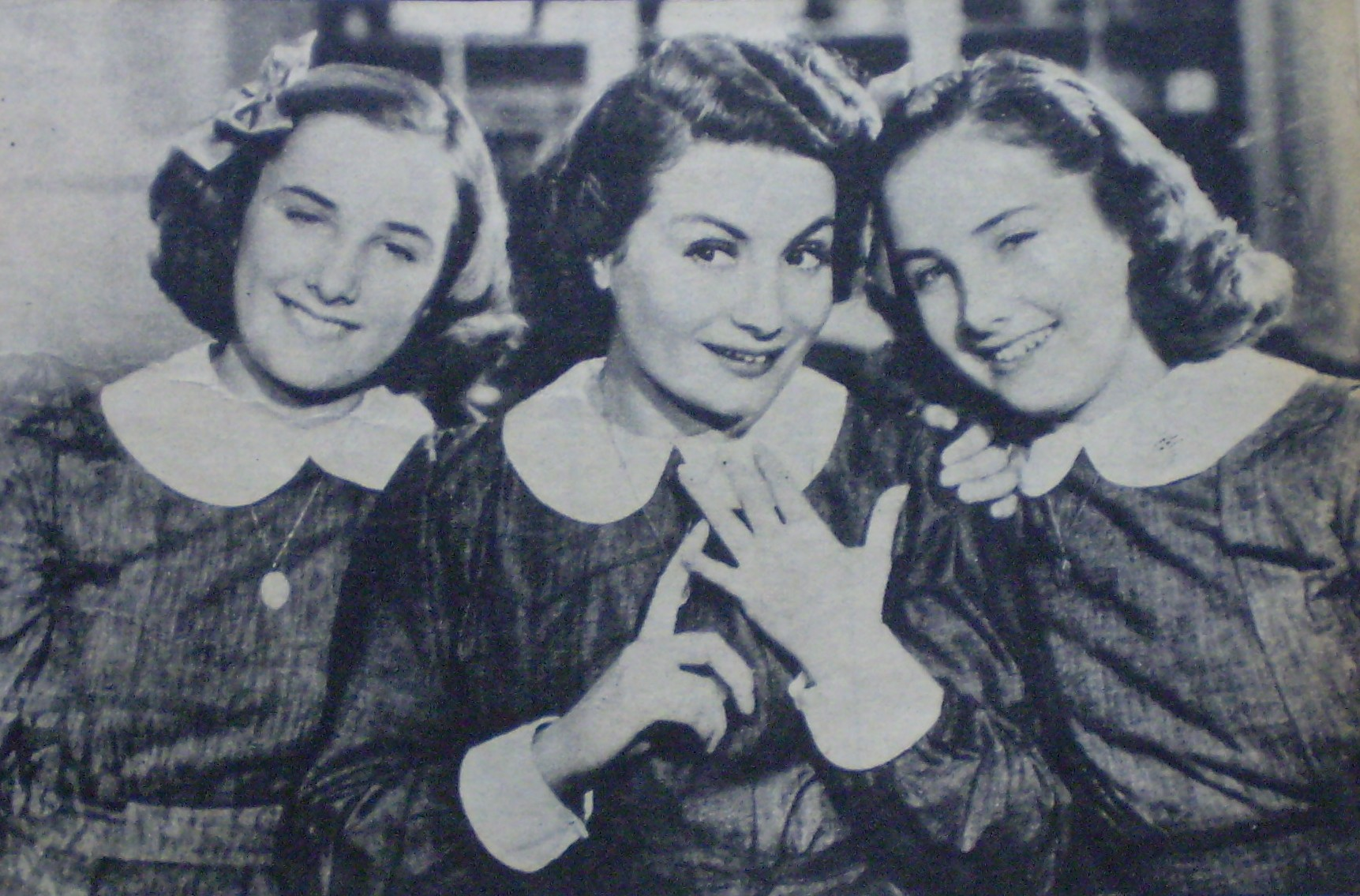
- Directed by: Luis César Amadori
- Written by: Tito Davison; René Garzón; Luis César Amadori
- Starring: Niní Marshall
- Cinematography: Alberto Etchebehere
- Edited by: Jorge Gárate; Nicolás Proserpio
- Music by: Mario Maurano
- Production company: Argentina Sono Film
- Distributed by: Argentina Sono Film
- Release date: 17 July 1940
- Running time: 75 minutes
- Country: Argentina
- Language: Spanish

Educating Niní (Spanish:Hay que educar a Niní) is a 1940 Argentine comedy film of the Golden Age of Argentine cinema, directed and co-written by Luis César Amadori and starring Niní Marshall, Francisco Álvarez and Pablo Palitos. The film's sets were designed by the art director Raúl Soldi. The film is notable for marking the film debut of twin teen actresses Mirtha and Silvia Legrand.

== Cast ==
- Niní Marshall as Niní
- Francisco Álvarez
- Pablo Palitos
- Nuri Montsé
- Héctor Calcaño
- Cirilo Etulain
- Carlos Lagrotta
- Elvira Quiroga
- Mecha López
- Baby Correa
- Edna Norrell
- Victoria Cuenca
- Mirtha Legrand as Niní
- Silvia Legrand
- Delfy de Ortega
