= Boína blanca =

- Directed by: Luis Moglia Barth
- Written by: Luis Moglia Barth, Rogelio Cordone, Carlos Goicochea
- Cinematography: Antonio Merayo
- Music by: Mario Maurano
- Distributed by: Argentina Sono Film S.A.C.I.
- Release date: 1941
- Running time: 74 minutes
- Country: Argentina
- Language: Spanish

Boína blanca is a 1941 Argentine drama film of the Golden Age of Argentine cinema, directed and written by Luis Moglia Barth based on the script by Carlos Goicochea and Rogelio Cordone.

== Cast ==
- Luis Aldás
- Fernando Caprio
- Alba Castellanos
- Carlos Castro
- Ada Cornaro
- Rufino Córdoba
- Nicolás Fregues
- Elisa Labardén
- Inés Murray
- Sabina Olmos
- José Otal
- Benita Puértolas
- Froilán Varela
- Francisco Álvarez
