= Carmen (1943 film) =

- Directed by: Luis César Amadori
- Written by: Luis César Amadori; Tito Insausti; Arnaldo Malfatti; Henri Meilhac; Prosper Mérimée (novel)
- Starring: Niní Marshall; Juan José Padilla; Adrián Cuneo
- Cinematography: Alberto Etchebehere
- Edited by: Jorge Gárate
- Music by: Mario Maurano
- Production company: Argentina Sono Film
- Release date: 26 October 1943
- Running time: 96 minutes
- Country: Argentina
- Language: Spanish

Carmen is a 1943 Argentine musical comedy film of the classical era of Argentine cinema directed by Luis César Amadori and starring Niní Marshall, Juan José Padilla and Adrián Cuneo.

The film's art direction was by Raúl Soldi.

== Cast ==
- Niní Marshall as Carmen
- Juan José Padilla as Escamillo
- Adrián Cuneo as Don José
- Juan José Piñeiro
- Manuel Perales
- Nelly Darén
- Carlos Tajes

== Bibliography ==
- Ann Davies & Phil Powrie. Carmen on Screen: An Annotated Filmography and Bibliography. Tamesis Books, 2006.
