= Su hermana menor =

1943 film by Enrique Cahen Salaberry

- Silvia Legrand and Zully Moreno in Su hermana menor.
- Directed by: Enrique Cahen Salaberry
- Written by: Carlos Adén
- Starring: Silvia Legrand; Zully Moreno; Santiago Arrieta; Oscar Valicelli
- Cinematography: Alberto Etchebehere
- Edited by: Jorge Garate
- Music by: Mario Maurano
- Production company: Argentina Sono Film
- Release date: April 30, 1943
- Running time: 85 minutes
- Country: Argentina
- Language: Spanish

Su hermana menor (English: Her Younger Sister) is a 1943 Argentine romantic comedy film of the classical era of Argentine cinema, directed by Enrique Cahen Salaberry on his debut. It stars Silvia Legrand, Zully Moreno, Santiago Arrieta and Oscar Valicelli. The script was written by Carlos Adén.

== Plot ==
María (Legrand), a servant girl, idolizes her glamorous older sister Gloria (Moreno), who is a model. When they fall in love with the same man, Gloria must sacrifice herself.

== Cast ==
- Silvia Legrand as María
- Zully Moreno as Gloria Morea
- Santiago Arrieta as Ricardo Olmedo
- Oscar Valicelli as Domingo Requena
- Semillita as Pocholo
- Herminia Mas as Doña Antonia
- Guillermo Pedemonte
- Warly Ceriani

== Reception ==
For La Nación, it was a "comedy with a simple theme, exhibiting most pleasingly the virtue of good taste in regard to its dramatic and scenic features" while Calki in El Mundo writes: "everything is smoothly presented, resolving the conflict... by means of an abundance of dialogue. This is no doubt intended to show poetically that by keeping to the road, sentimental kitsch can be avoided.
