= Celos (film) =

- Directed by: Mario Soffici
- Screenplay by: Tulio Demicheli
- Story by: Leo Tolstoy
- Starring: Pedro López Lagar; Zully Moreno
- Cinematography: Alberto Etchebehere
- Edited by: Jorge Gárate
- Music by: Guillermo Cases
- Production company: Argentina Sono Film S.A.C.I
- Release date: August 23, 1946
- Running time: 95 minutes
- Country: Argentina
- Language: Spanish

Celos is a 1946 Argentine melodrama film of the classical era of Argentine cinema, directed by Mario Soffici and starring Pedro López Lagar and Zully Moreno. It won four Silver Condor awards, including Best Film, Best Director (Mario Soffici), Best Actor (Pedro López Lagar) and Best Original Screenplay (Tulio Demicheli), given by the Argentine Film Critics Association in 1947 for the best films and performances of the previous year.

== Cast ==
- Pedro López Lagar as Pablo
- Zully Moreno as Luisa
- Juan José Míguez as Roberto
- Ricardo Galache
- Federico Mansilla as lawyer
- Gloria Bayardo as Luisa's mother
- Carlos Belluci as José
- Adela Adamowa as Selva
- Amadora Gerbolés
- Salvador Sinaí
