= Cleopatra Was Candida =

1964 film

- Directed by: Julio Saraceni
- Written by: Abel Santacruz; Rodolfo Torrado Estrada (play)
- Produced by: Carmelo Santiago
- Starring: Niní Marshall; Juan Verdaguer; Tito Lusiardo
- Cinematography: Américo Hoss
- Edited by: Jorge Gárate
- Music by: Lucio Milena
- Production company: Argentina Sono Film
- Distributed by: Argentina Sono Film
- Release date: 23 April 1964
- Running time: 90 minutes
- Country: Argentina
- Language: Spanish

Cleopatra Was Candida (Spanish:Cleopatra era Cándida) is a 1964 Argentine comedy film directed by Julio Saraceni and starring Niní Marshall, Juan Verdaguer and Tito Lusiardo.

== Cast ==
- Niní Marshall as Cleopatra García Pérez a.k.a. Cándida
- Juan Verdaguer as Florencio Ferrari
- Tito Lusiardo as Valentín a.k.a. Dr. Arévalo
- Amelia Vargas as Berta
- Johnny Tedesco as Johnny
- Estela Molly as Catalina
- Vicente Rubino as Distéfano
- Tristan as Fermín
- Mario Savino
- Orestes Soriani
- Susana Ferrer
- Otto Weber
- Héctor Fuentes
- Ego Brunoldi
- Juan Carlos Cevallos
- Jesús Pampín

== Bibliography ==
- Plazaola, Luis Trelles. South American Cinema. La Editorial, UPR, 1989.
