= Christmas with the Poor =

- Directed by: Manuel Romero
- Written by: Manuel Romero; Nicolás Viola
- Produced by: Edgardo Togni
- Starring: Niní Marshall; Irma Córdoba; Tito Lusiardo
- Cinematography: Alberto Etchebehere
- Edited by: Jorge Gárate
- Music by: Guillermo Cases; Paul Misraki
- Production company: Argentina Sono Film
- Distributed by: Argentina Sono Film
- Release date: 12 August 1947
- Running time: 71 minutes
- Country: Argentina
- Language: Spanish

Christmas with the Poor or The Poor People's Christmas (Spanish:Navidad de los pobres) is a 1947 Argentine comedy film of the classical era of Argentine cinema, directed by Manuel Romero and starring Niní Marshall, Irma Córdoba and Tito Lusiardo.

== Cast ==
- Niní Marshall
- Irma Córdoba
- Tito Lusiardo
- Fernando Lamas
- Osvaldo Miranda
- Orestes Soriani
- Esperanza Palomero
- Rosa Martín
- Vicente Forastieri
- Betty Lagos
- Pepita Muñoz
- Semillita
- Hugo Lanzilotta
- Aída Villadeamigo as Lajefa

== See also ==
- List of Christmas films
- List of works by Manuel Romero

== Bibliography ==
- Paul A. Schroeder Rodríguez. Latin American Cinema: A Comparative History. Univ of California Press, 2016.
