= Edmo =

Edmo or EDMO may refer to:

- Edmo Cominetti, Argentinian director of films such as Red Blossoms
- Edmo, nickname for Andrew Edmondson (born 1990), an Australian wheelchair rugby champion
- E.D.Mo., an abbreviation for the United States District Court for the Eastern District of Missouri
- Empty dwelling management order
- EDMO, ICAO airport code for Oberpfaffenhofen Airport in Bavaria, Germany
