= Caídos en el infierno =

- Directed by: Luis Cesar Amadori
- Written by: Luis César Amadori
- Based on: Caídos en el infierno by Michael Valbeck
- Starring: Laura Hidalgo
- Cinematography: Antonio Merayo
- Edited by: Jorge Gárate
- Music by: Tito Ribero
- Release date: 20 August 1954
- Running time: 112 minutes
- Country: Argentina
- Language: Spanish

Caídos en el infierno is a 1954 Argentine film directed and written by Luis César Amadori during the classical era of Argentine cinema. It is based on Michael Valbeck's novel of the same name. The film was released on August 20, 1954.

== Plot ==
Out of ambition, a woman sacrifices her true love and marries a man of fortune.

== Cast ==
- Laura Hidalgo as Wanda
- Eduardo Cuitiño as Guillermo Brandsen
- Alberto de Mendoza as Adrián Villar
- Guillermo Battaglia as Mauro Cogan
- Domingo Sapelli as Inspector Nielsen
- Irma Roy as Hilda Villar
- Susana Campos as Renata Brissol
- Mario Lozano as Stefano
- Pedro Laxalt as Dr. Mateo
- Margarita Burke as Mucama
