= Girls Orchestra =

- Directed by: Luis César Amadori
- Written by: Ariel Cortazzo; Conrado de Koller
- Starring: Niní Marshall; Francisco Álvarez; Zully Moreno
- Cinematography: Alberto Etchebehere; Antonio Merayo
- Edited by: Jorge Gárate
- Music by: Mario Maurano
- Production company: Argentina Sono Film
- Distributed by: Argentina Sono Film
- Release date: 21 May 1941
- Running time: 88 minutes
- Country: Argentina
- Language: Spanish

Girls Orchestra (Spanish:Orquesta de señoritas) is a 1941 Argentine musical comedy film of the Golden Age of Argentine cinema, directed by Luis César Amadori and starring Niní Marshall, Francisco Álvarez and Zully Moreno.

The film's art direction was by Raúl Soldi.

== Cast ==
- Niní Marshall as Nina / Giovannina
- Francisco Álvarez as Don Francisco Sánchez
- Zully Moreno as Blanca
- Victoria Cuenca
- Arturo Bamio
- Héctor Vozza
- Pedro Quartucci as Rodolfo Sánchez
- Semillita
- Judith Sulian
- Julio Renato
- Morena Chiolo
- Ambrosio Radrizzani
- Pedro Porzio

== Bibliography ==
- Abel Posadas. Niní Marshall: desde un ayer lejano. Ediciones Colihue SRL, 1993.
