= God Bless You (film) =

God Reward You
- Directed by: Luis César Amadori
- Written by: Joracy Camargo (play), Tulio Demicheli (writer)
- Cinematography: Alberto Etchebehere
- Edited by: Jorge Gárate
- Music by: Juan Ehlert
- Release date: March 11, 1948
- Running time: 120 minutes
- Country: Argentina
- Language: Spanish

God Bless You (Dios se lo pague) is a 1948 Argentine melodrama film of the classical era directed by Luis César Amadori and starring Arturo de Córdova and Zully Moreno, produced during the classical era of Argentina cinema. It won the Silver Condor Award for Best Film, given by the Argentine Film Critics Association in 1949 for the best picture of the previous year. It entered 1948 Venice International Film Festival.

In a survey of the 100 greatest films of Argentine cinema carried out by the Museo del Cine Pablo Ducrós Hicken in 2000, the film reached the 14th position. In 2022, the film was included in Spanish magazine Fotogramas's list of the 20 best Argentine films of all time.

== Plot ==
Nancy, a woman gambler who frequents underground casinos, who flaunts her elegance to hide her poverty while biding her time to find a wealthy man to appear and take care of her, talks to an old man begging at the door of a casino. Shortly after, a rich and mysterious man offers her a life of luxury, albeit far from social conventions. He does not want to marry or tell her anything about his life; In return, he offers her luxuries and everything she has dreamed of all her life.

She also meets the son of a very important textile businessman, who becomes obsessed with her and begins to pursue her. He proposes that they run away together, and even steals to finance her escape to the United States.

The day they are supposed to leave, the husband doesn't leave the house at the usual time and Nancy gets scared. The beggar and her husband turn out to be the same person. She decides not to leave him and instead goes to the church, where the beggar begs for alms. They both get married.

== Cast ==
- Arturo de Córdova
- Zully Moreno
- Florindo Ferrario
- Enrique Chaico
- Federico Mansilla
- Zoe Ducós
- José Comellas
- Roberto Bordoni
- Ramón Garay
- Tito Grassi
- Adolfo Linvel
- José Antonio Paonessa
- Enrique de Pedro
- Nicolás Taricano
- Aída Villadeamigo

== Awards ==
The movie won 5 Awards from the Argentine Academy of Cinematography Arts and Sciences:

- Best Film (Mejor película).
- Best Director (Mejor director)
- Best Actress (Mejor actriz protagónica): Zully Moreno
- Best Actor (Mejor actor protagónico): Arturo de Córdova
- Best Supporting Actress (Mejor actriz de reparto): Enrique Chaico

In addition, the movie also won 3 academic plates and diplomas:

- Sound: Tulio Demicheli, Alberto Etchebehere, Juan Ehlert, Mario Fezia and Carlos Marín.
- Editing: Jorge Garate.
- Filming: Roque Giacovino.

The movie won the Best Argentine film award at the Hispano-American Contest of Madrid

== 1981 telenovela ==
In 1981 ATC (Argentina Televisora Color) broadcast the telenovela Dios se lo pague adapted by Vicente Sesso and directed by Alberto Rinaldi. The telenovela starred Víctor Hugo Vieyra, Leonor Benedetto, Federico Luppi, Gloria Antier, Susy Kent, Gianni Lunadei and Juan Peña.
