= Adrián Cuneo =

Argentine film actor

Adrián Cúneo
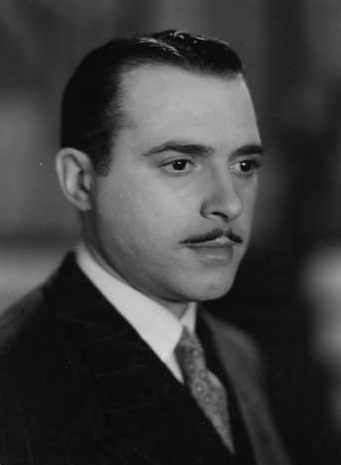
- Adrián Cúneo
- Born: 8 September 1912; Argentina
- Occupation: Actor
- Years active: 1939-1987 (film)

Adrián Cuneo (1912–1995) was an Argentine film actor. He co-starred with the comedian Niní Marshall in a number of films.

== Selected filmography ==
- Four Hearts (1939)
- Flecha de oro (1940)
- The Tango Star (1940)
- Mother Gloria (1941)
- Tomorrow I'll Kill Myself (1942)
- Amor último modelo (1942)
- En el último piso (1942)
- An Evening of Love (1943)
- Carmen (1943)
- Madame Sans-Gêne (1945)

== Bibliography ==
- Ann Davies & Phil Powrie. Carmen on Screen: An Annotated Filmography and Bibliography. Tamesis Books, 2006.
