= Madrugada =

Madrugada may refer to:

- Madrugada (band), a Norwegian rock band
  - Madrugada (Madrugada album), a 2008 album by Madrugada
- Madrugada (film), a 1957 Argentinian film
- Madrugada (Melanie album), a 1974 album by Melanie Safka
- "Madrugada" (song), Portugal's 1975 Eurovision entry

== See also ==
- Blue hour
