= The Song of the Suburbs =

1941 film

- Directed by: Luis César Amadori
- Written by: Ivo Pelay; Luis César Amadori
- Starring: Aída Alberti; Alicia Vignoli; Hugo del Carril; Francisco Álvarez
- Cinematography: Alberto Etchebehere
- Edited by: Nicolás Proserpio
- Music by: Francisco Canaro
- Production company: Sono Film
- Distributed by: Sono Film
- Release date: 5 March 1941
- Running time: 108 minutes
- Country: Argentina
- Language: Spanish

The Song of the Suburbs (Spanish: La canción de los barrios) is a 1941 Argentine musical film of the Golden Age of Argentine cinema, directed by Luis César Amadori, who co-wrote it with Ivo Pelay, and starring Aída Alberti, Alicia Vignoli and Hugo del Carril.

== Cast ==
- Aída Alberti
- Alicia Vignoli
- Hugo del Carril
- Francisco Álvarez
- Arturo Bamio
- Cirilo Etulain
- Eliseo Herrero
- Adolfo Meyer
- Fausto Padín
- José Antonio Paonessa
- Joaquín Petrocino
- Elvira Quiroga
- Julio Renato
- Jorge Villoldo

== Bibliography ==
- Rist, Peter H. Historical Dictionary of South American Cinema. Rowman & Littlefield, 2014.
