= Saint Candida (film) =

- Film poster
- Directed by: Luis César Amadori
- Written by: Antonio Botta
- Starring: Niní Marshall; Francisco Álvarez; Nelly Darén; Adolfo Linvel
- Cinematography: Alberto Etchebehere; Antonio Merayo
- Edited by: Jorge Gárate
- Music by: Mario Maurano
- Production company: Argentina Sono Film
- Distributed by: Argentina Sono Film
- Release date: 10 May 1945
- Running time: 90 minutes
- Country: Argentina
- Language: Spanish

Saint Candida (Spanish:Santa Cándida) is a 1945 Argentine comedy film of the classical era of Argentine cinema, directed by Luis César Amadori and starring Niní Marshall, Francisco Álvarez and Nelly Darén. The film's title is a reference to Candida the Elder. Delfy de Ortega won the Silver Condor Award for Best New Actress for her performance.

== Cast ==
- Niní Marshall as Cándida
- Nelly Darén
- Francisco Álvarez
- Semillita
- Delfy de Ortega
- Adolfo Linvel
- Pura Díaz
- Tita Perly
- Carmen Giménez
- Aída Fernández
- Maruca Montejo
- Blanca Vidal
- María de la Fuente
- Margarita Burke
- Adrián Cúneo
- Carlos Lagrotta
- Federico Mansilla
- Rufino Córdoba
- César Fiaschi
- Ernesto Villegas
- Francisco Barletta
- Marcelle Marcel
- Warly Ceriani
- Pura Díaz
- Fausto Padín
- Walter Jacob
- Aída Fernández
- José Rivas
- Fernando Campos

== Bibliography ==
- Abel Posadas, Mónica Landro & Marta Speroni. Cine sonoro argentino: 1933-1943. El Calafate Editores, 2005.
