= Cristina (film) =

- Directed by: Francisco Múgica
- Written by: Carlos A. Olivari; Sixto Pondal Ríos
- Starring: Zully Moreno; Esteban Serrador; Alberto Closas
- Cinematography: Antonio Merayo
- Edited by: Jorge Gárate
- Music by: Bert Rosé; Rodolfo Sciammarella
- Production company: Argentina Sono Film
- Release date: 18 January 1946
- Running time: 78 minutes
- Country: Argentina
- Language: Spanish

Cristina is a 1946 Argentine comedy-drama film of the classical era of Argentine cinema, directed by Francisco Múgica and starring Zully Moreno, Esteban Serrador and Alberto Closas.

== Cast ==
- Zully Moreno
- Esteban Serrador
- Alberto Closas
- Paloma Efron
- Berta Moss
- Juan José Piñeiro
- Alba Castellanos
- Liana Noda
- Domingo Mania
- Alcira Ghío
- Zulma Montes
- María Luisa Fernandez
- Julián Bourges
