= El barro humano =

El Barro humano
- Directed by: Luis César Amadori
- Starring: Zully Moreno; Carlos López Moctezuma; Juan José Miguez; Jorge Salcedo; Nelly Panizza; Felisa Mary
- Cinematography: Antonio Merayo
- Edited by: Jorge Gárate
- Music by: Tito Ribero
- Release date: 1955
- Running time: 104 minutes
- Country: Argentina
- Language: Spanish

El Barro humano is a 1955 Argentine film, directed and written by Luis César Amadori and based on the theater play by Luis Rodríguez Acassuso. The movie was released on May 2, 1955, and rated PG 16.

== Cast ==
- Zully Moreno as Mercedes Romero de Vargas Peña
- Carlos López Moctezuma as Eduardo Vargas Peña
- Juan José Míguez as Octavio Reyes
- Jorge Salcedo as Fiscal
- Nelly Panizza as Elisa Márbiz
- Felisa Mary as Clara
- Héctor Calcaño as Felipe Romero
- Ricardo Galache as Néstor Rómulo
- Domingo Sapelli as Presidente del tribunal
