= The Outlaw (1939 film) =

1939 film

- Directed by: Orestes Caviglia
- Written by: Orestes Caviglia; Yamandu Rodríguez
- Starring: Agustín Irusta
- Release date: 12 July 1939
- Running time: 83 minutes
- Country: Argentina
- Language: Spanish

The Outlaw (Spanish: El matrero) is a 1939 Argentine drama film of the Golden Age of Argentine cinema directed by Orestes Caviglia and starring Agustín Irusta.

== Cast ==
- Agustín Irusta
- Amelia Bence
- Carlos Perelli
- Roberto Escalada
- Ada Cornaro
- José Otal
- Sebastián Chiola
