= Night and Dawn =

- Directed by: José María Forqué
- Written by: José María Forqué; Mariano Ozores; Alfonso Paso; Alfonso Sastre
- Cinematography: Cecilio Paniagua
- Edited by: Julio Peña
- Music by: Isidro B. Maiztegui
- Production company: Eurofilms
- Distributed by: Radio Films
- Release date: 10 October 1958
- Running time: 90 minutes
- Country: Spain
- Language: Spanish

Night and Dawn (Spanish: La noche y el alba) is a 1958 Spanish drama film directed by José María Forqué and starring Francisco Rabal, Zully Moreno and Manuel Alexandre.

== Plot ==
Pedro is a street photographer who fought on the Republican side during the Spanish Civil War and is obsessed with a model. The young woman accidentally dies in an appointment with an engineer but Pedro is accused. Carlos, even though he knows the truth, doesn't tell the police so as not to jeopardize his career.

== Cast ==
- Francisco Rabal as Pedro
- Zully Moreno as Marta
- Rosita Arenas as Amparo
- António Vilar as Carlos
- Rafael Bardem as Director
- María Asquerino
- Manuel Alexandre as Delegado
- Félix Dafauce as Mendoza
- Isabel de Pomés
- José Luis López Vázquez as Fotógrafo

== Bibliography ==
- Bentley, Bernard. A Companion to Spanish Cinema. Boydell & Brewer 2008.
