= Dakota Joe =

1967 film

- Spanish: Un hombre y un Colt
- Directed by: Tulio Demicheli
- Screenplay by: Tulio Demicheli; Vicente Maldonado; Nino Stresa
- Story by: Nino Stresa
- Produced by: Tulio Demicheli; Alberto Grimaldi
- Starring: Robert Hundar; Fernando Sancho
- Cinematography: Emilio Foriscot; Oberdan Troiani
- Edited by: Eugenio Alabiso; José Luis Matesanz
- Music by: Coriolano Gori; Oliver Piña Ángel
- Production companies: Produzioni Europee Associati (PEA); Tulio Demicheli P.C.
- Distributed by: Divisa Home Video; Hispamex Films
- Release date: 21 September 1967 (Turkey)
- Running time: 85 min
- Country: Argentina

Dakota Joe or Man and a Colt (Spanish: Un hombre y un Colt) is a 1967 Argentine Spaghetti Western film directed by Tulio Demicheli, produced by Alberto Grimaldi, and starring Robert Hundar, Fernando Sancho, Gloria Milland, Mirko Ellis, Luis Gaspar, and José Canalejas.

It was shot in desierto de Tabernas in Almería; in Manzanares el Real, Seseña and Torrejón de Ardoz in the community of Madrid; and Italy. It is set in Texas and Mexico.

== Cast ==
- Robert Hundar as Dakota Joe
- Fernando Sancho as Pedro
- Mirko Ellis as Don Carlos
- Gloria Milland as Carmencita
- Marta Reves as Beatrice
- Jacinto Martín
- Paco Morán as Gracián
- Félix Dafauce as Doctor García Gómez
- Antonio Mayans
- Luis Gaspar
- Raf Baldasarre
- Vittoria Di Silverio as Marta
- Ana Cervajal
- Emilio S. Espinosa
- Giovanni Petti
- José Canalejas
- Jesús Guzman as Viajero en la diligencia asaltada
- Simón Arriaga
- Josefina Serratosa as Inés
- Ramón Serrano
- Agustín Bescos
