= Historia de una noche =

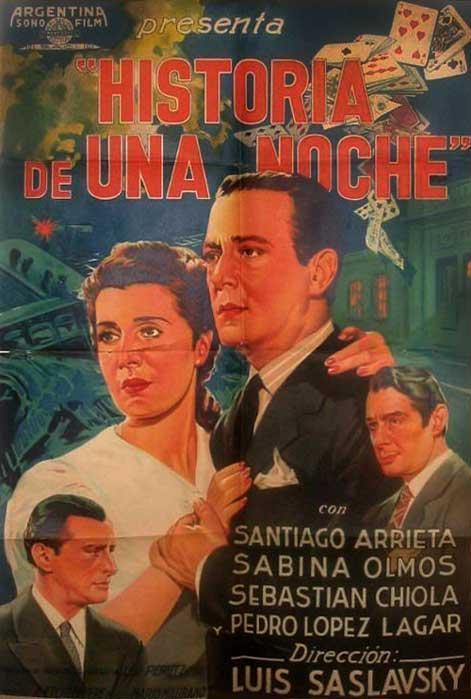
- Directed by: Luis Saslavsky
- Written by: Leo Perutz (play Morgen ist Feiertag); Luis Saslavsky (screenplay); Carlos Aden (screenplay)
- Release date: 1941
- Country: Argentina
- Language: Spanish

Historia de una noche is a 1941 Argentine film of the Golden Age of Argentine cinema directed by Luis Saslavsky.

In a survey of the 100 greatest films of Argentine cinema carried out by the Museo del Cine Pablo Ducrós Hicken in 2000, the film reached the 43rd position.

== Plot ==
A man returns to his village after a long time and meets his ex-girlfriend, now married to a husband in desperate economic situation.

== Cast ==
- Santiago Arrieta
- Eliane Arroyo
- María Esther Buschiazzo
- Sebastián Chiola
- Victoria Cuenca
- Rafael Frontaura
- Alfredo Jordan
- Pedro López Lagar
- Felisa Mary
- Sabina Olmos
- Raimundo Pastore
- Elvira Quiroga
- Renée Sutil
- Ramón J. Garay
- Claudio Martino
