= Carlos Lagrotta =

Argentine actor

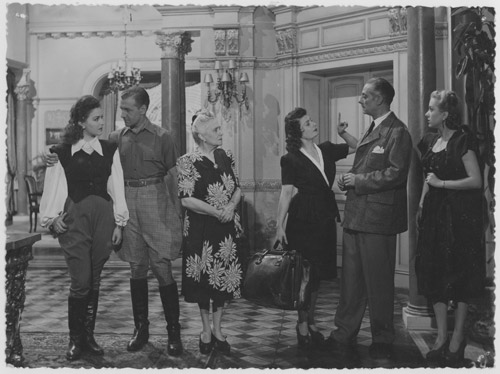
Lagrotta (second from left) in The Headless Woman (1947)

Carlos Lagrotta was an Argentine actor. In 1943 he starred in Benito Perojo's Stella. Other films include Hay que educar a Niní (1940), Santa Cándida (1945), The Headless Woman (1947) and El muerto es un vivo (1953).

== Selected filmography ==
- Educating Niní (1940)
- By the Light of a Star (1941)
- His Best Student (1944)
- Seven Women (1944)
- Saint Candida (1945)
- The Sin of Julia (1946)
- El Muerto es un vivo (1953)
