= The Lady of the Camellias (1953 Argentine film) =

1953 film

- Directed by: Ernesto Arancibia
- Written by: Ernesto Arancibia; Alexis de Arancibia
- Based on: The Lady of the Camellias by Alexandre Dumas
- Starring: Zully Moreno; Carlos Thompson; Mona Maris
- Cinematography: Antonio Merayo
- Edited by: José Serra
- Music by: Tito Ribero
- Production company: Argentina Sono Film
- Distributed by: Argentina Sono Film
- Release date: 5 February 1953
- Running time: 115 minutes
- Country: Argentina
- Language: Spanish

The Lady of the Camellias (Spanish: La mujer de las camelias) is a 1953 Argentine melodrama film of the classical era of Argentine cinema, directed by Ernesto Arancibia and starring Zully Moreno, Carlos Thompson and Mona Maris. It is an adaptation of the 1848 novel The Lady of the Camellias by Alexandre Dumas. The film's sets were designed by the art director Gori Muñoz.

== Cast ==
- Zully Moreno as Margarita Gautier
- Carlos Thompson Armand Duval
- Mona Maris
- Nicolás Fregues
- Ricardo Argemí
- Josefa Goldar
- Mario Faig
- Jesús Pampín
- Hilda Rey
- María del Río
- Alberto Barcel
- Juan Carlos Palma
- Liana Moabro
- Ana Arneodo
- Daniel Tedeschi
- Tina Helba
- Eduardo Moyano
- Alfredo Distasio
- Lina Bardo
- María Perdiguero
- Rafael Diserio
- José Dorado
- Carmen Giménez
- Leda Zanda
- Víctor Martucci
- Raulito González
- Nina Marchi
- Nora Núñez
- Federico Guillermo Pedrido
- Antonio Perdiguero
- Chichi Banfi
- Santiago Gómez Cou

== Bibliography ==
- Campbell, Russell. Marked Women: Prostitutes and Prostitution in the Cinema. University of Wisconsin Press, 2006.
- Ferreira, Fernando. Luz, cámara-- memoria: una historia social del cine argentino. Corregidor, 1995.
