= Sebastián Chiola =

Argentine actor

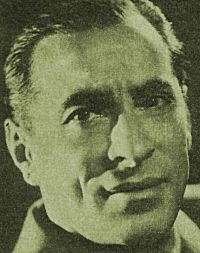
- Chiola in 1950
- Born: 5 May 1902; Rosario, Santa Fe, Argentina
- Died: 7 February 1950 (aged 47); Rosario, Argentina
- Occupation: Actor
- Years active: 1937–1949 (film)

Sebastián Chiola (5 May 1902 – 7 February 1950) was an Argentine film actor. In 1945 he won the Silver Condor Award for Best Supporting Actor for his performance in the thriller The Corpse Breaks a Date (1944).

== Selected filmography ==
- Palermo (1937)
- La fuga (1937)
- The Outlaw (1939)
- Con el dedo en el gatillo (1940)
- Historia de una noche (1941)
- Vidas marcadas (1942)
- The Gaucho War (1942)
- A Doll's House (1943)
- Gold in the Hand (1943)
- The Corpse Breaks a Date (1944)
- The Abyss Opens (1945)
- Viaje sin regreso (1946)
- Hardly a Criminal (1949)

== Bibliography ==
- Finkielman, Jorge. The Film Industry in Argentina: An Illustrated Cultural History. McFarland, 2003.
