= The Unwanted (1951 film) =

1951 film

- Directed by: Mario Soffici
- Written by: Rafael García Ibáñez; José Ramón Luna
- Produced by: Carmelo Vecchione
- Starring: Zully Moreno; Carlos Thompson; Guillermo Battaglia
- Cinematography: Antonio Merayo
- Edited by: Jorge Gárate
- Music by: Alejandro Gutiérrez del Barrio
- Production company: Argentina Sono Film
- Release date: 1951
- Running time: 83 minutes
- Country: Argentina
- Language: Spanish

The Unwanted (Spanish: La indeseable) is a 1951 Argentine drama film from the classical era of Argentine cinema, directed by Mario Soffici and starring Zully Moreno, Carlos Thompson, and Guillermo Battaglia.

The film's sets were designed by the art director Gori Muñoz.

== Cast ==
- Zully Moreno as Elsa Robles
- Carlos Thompson as Carlos Álvarez
- Guillermo Battaglia as Fernando Aguirre
- Eduardo Cuitiño
- Pascual Pellicciotta
- Domingo Mania
- Pilar Gómez
- José Ruzzo
- Adolfo Linvel
- Nelly Meden
- Luis Corradi
- Tito Grassi
- Jesús Pampín
- Carlos Belluci
- Luis Mora
- Enrique Giacobino
- Warly Ceriani
- Julián Pérez Ávila
- Carmen Giménez
- Martha Atoche
- Aida Villadeamigo
