= Con el dedo en el gatillo =

- Directed by: Luis Moglia Barth
- Written by: Homero Manzi, Ulises Petit de Murat
- Starring: Sebastián Chiola; Alita Román; Pedro Maratea
- Cinematography: Antonio Merayo
- Music by: Mario Maurano
- Release date: 19 June 1940
- Country: Argentina
- Language: Spanish

Con el dedo en el gatillo is a 1940 Argentine film directed by Luis Moglia Barth during the Golden Age of Argentine cinema.

== Cast ==
- Sebastián Chiola ...Salvador Di Pietro
- Alita Román ...Rosa
- Pedro Maratea ...Marú
- Nuri Montsé ...Aurora Aguirre
- Oscar Valicelli ...Américo
- José Otal ...Aquiles Bertozzi
- Cayetano Biondo ...Pólvora
- Ernesto Villegas ...Jeremías, vendedor de biblias
- Pablo Cumo ... Policía
- Emilio Gola ...Miguel
- José Antonio Paonessa ...Comisario
- Joaquín Petrocino ...Delincuente
- Elvira Quiroga ...Madre de Salvador
- Marino Seré ...Falsificador
- Juan Vítola
