= The Headless Woman (1947 film) =

The Headless Woman Una Mujer Sin Cabeza
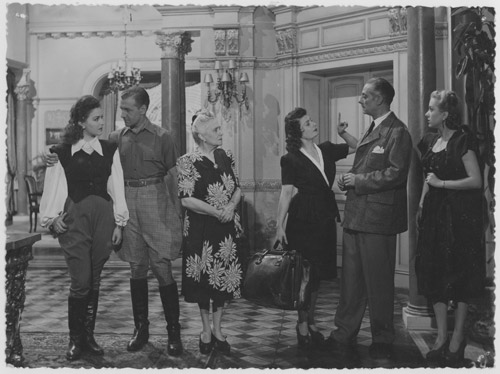
- Directed by: Luis César Amadori
- Written by: Luis César Amadori; Luis Martin de San Vicente
- Starring: Niní Marshall
- Cinematography: Alberto Etchebehere
- Edited by: Jorge Gárate
- Music by: Víctor Slister
- Distributed by: Argentina Sono Film S.A.C.I.
- Release date: 4 April 1947
- Running time: 90 minutes
- Country: Argentina
- Language: Spanish

The Headless Woman (Spanish: Una mujer sin cabeza) is a 1947 Argentine comedy horror film of the classical era of Argentine cinema, directed by Luis César Amadori and starring Niní Marshall. It is a parody of the horror genre. The title alludes to the trick called "The Aztec Flower" that was used in shows, which makes the head of a woman appear separated from the body and located on a vase.

== Plot ==
A circus gypsy girl (Nini Marshall) and a young friend (Perla Mux) flee from the police and take refuge in a strange house.

== Cast ==
- Niní Marshall as Niní
- Francisco Charmiello as Manuel
- Angelina Pagano as Matilde
- Perla Mux as Nelly
- Tato de Serra as Carlos
- Pascual Pellicciotta as doctor
- Carlos Lagrotta as Cipriano Guevara
- Camilo Da Passano as Escribano Rómulo
- Zulma Montes
- Carlos Perelli as Ricardo Vila Gómez
- Luis Otero as Tommy
- Iris Portillo as Gitana
- Perla Achával
- Leticia Scury as Faraona
- Margarita Burke as Lola
- Antonio Martiánez as Eustaquio Rojas Vilas
- Gonzalo Palomero
- Arturo Bamio
- Nicolás Taricano
- María Ferez
- Miguel Caiazzo
- Carlos Alajarín
- Marcio Artinelli
