= Tulio Demicheli =

Argentine-born Spanish film director, screenwriter and film producer

- Born: Armando Bartolomé Demichelli; September 15, 1914; Buenos Aires, Argentina
- Died: May 25, 1992 (aged 77); Madrid, Spain
- Occupations: Film director, screenwriter
- Years active: 1944-1987

Armando Bartolomé "Tulio" Demicheli (August 15, 1914 - May 25, 1992) was an Argentine-born Spanish film director, screenwriter and film producer notable for his work during the Golden Age of Argentine cinema.

Demicheli initially began as a screenwriter in 1944 but by 1950 with his directorial debut in Arrabalera in 1950 he began to simultaneously direct and write for his films. He directed and wrote for some 60 films between 1944 and 1987. Overall he is best known for his work in tango film production and worked with popular actors of the period such as Tita Merello, Santiago Gómez Cou and Tito Alonso.

He died on May 25, 1992, from cancer, aged 77.

== Filmography ==
=== As screenwriter ===
- El misterio Eva Perón (1987)
- El sexo de los ricos (1984)
- Ya nunca más (1984)
- Con el cuerpo prestado (1983)
- Los ojos de un niño (1982)
- Alejandra, mon amour (1979)
- Siete chicas peligrosas (1979) (as Tulio de Micheli)
- Préstamela esta noche (1978)
- Convoy Buddies (1977)
- Eva, ¿qué hace ese hombre en tu cama? (1975)
- Simón y Mateo (1975)
- Escándalo (1974)
- También los ángeles comen judías (1973) (as Tullio De Micheli)
- Reza por tu alma... y muere (1970)
- Top Secret (1967) (adaptation)
- Un hombre y un colt (1967)
- El halcón y la presa (1966) (uncredited)
- La mujer perdida (1966)
- Nuestro agente en Casablanca (1966)
- Misión Lisboa (1965)
- Desafío en Río Bravo (1965)
- Mi noche de bodas (1961)
- Navidades en junio (1960)
- Hay alguien detrás de la puerta (1960)
- Carmen de Grenade (1959)
- Charlestón (1959)
- Las locuras de Bárbara (1959)
- El hombre que me gusta (1958)
- Ama a tu prójimo (1958)
- Una golfa (1958)
- Cuatro copas (1958)
- Desnúdate, Lucrecia (1958)

- Dios no lo quiera (1957)
- Bambalinas (1957)
- La Dulce Enemiga (1957)
- La adúltera (1956)
- Sublime melodía (1956)
- Una lección de amor (1956)
- No me olvides nunca (1956)
- La herida luminosa (1956)
- Locura pasional (1956)
- Más fuerte que el amor (1955)
- Un extraño en la escalera (1955)
- Dock Sud (1953)
- La voz de mi ciudad (1953)
- La melodía perdida (1952)
- Vivir un instante (1951)
- La comedia inmortal (1951)
- Mi vida por la tuya (1951)
- Arrabalera (1950)
- Lejos del cielo (1950)
- Apenas un delincuente (1949)
- Con el sudor de tu frente (1949)
- Dios se lo pague (1948)
- La gata (1947)
- La secta del trébol (1947)
- El secreto de una vida (1947)
- Celos (1946)
- The Sin of Julia (1946)
- Cuando en el cielo pasen lista (1945)
- Back in the Seventies (1945)
- La amarga verdad (1945)
- 24 horas en la vida de una mujer (1944)

=== As director ===
- El misterio Eva Perón (1987)
- El sexo de los ricos (1984)
- Los renglones torcidos de Dios (1983)
- Con el cuerpo prestado (1983)
- Los ojos de un niño (1982)
- Novia, esposa y amante (1981)
- Ángel negro (1980)
- La llamada del sexo (1977)
- Préstamela esta noche (1978)
- Eva, ¿qué hace ese hombre en tu cama? (1975)
- Juego sucio en Panamá (1975)
- Bienvenido, Mister Krif (1975)
- Shoshena (1974)
- Ella (1973)
- Ricco the Mean Machine (1973)
- Uno, dos, tres... dispara otra vez (1973)
- Coartada en disco rojo (1972) (as Tulio Demichelli)
- Reza por tu alma... y muere (1970)
- Los Monstruos del Terror (1970) (as Tulio Demichelli)
- Un hombre y un colt (1967)
- La mujer perdida (1966)
- Nuestro agente en Casablanca (1966)
- Misión Lisboa (1965)
- Desafío en Río Bravo (1965)
- La primera aventura (1965)
- Los elegidos (1964)
- El hijo del capitán Blood (1962) (as Tullio Demicheli)
- Mi noche de bodas (1961)
- Navidades en junio (1960)
- El amor que yo te di (1960)

- El cielo dentro de la casa (1960)
- Hay alguien detrás de la puerta (1960)
- Carmen de Grenade (1959)
- Charlestón (1959)
- Las locuras de Bárbara (1959)
- El hombre que me gusta (1958)
- Ama a tu prójimo (1958)
- Una golfa (1958)
- Préstame tu cuerpo (1958)
- Cuatro copas (1958)
- Desnúdate, Lucrecia (1958)
- Dios no lo quiera (1957)
- Bambalinas (1957)
- Feliz año, amor mío (1957)
- La adúltera (1956)
- Sublime melodía (1956)
- La herida luminosa (1956)
- Locura pasional (1956)
- Más fuerte que el amor (1955)
- Un extraño en la escalera (1955)
- Dock Sud (1953)
- La voz de mi ciudad (1953)
- La melodía perdida (1952)
- Emergency Ward (Sala de guardia) (1952)
- To Live for a Moment (1951)
- Arrabalera (1950)

=== As producer ===
- Nuestro agente en Casablanca (1966)
- Misión Lisboa (1965)
- La primera aventura (1965)
- El señor de La Salle (1964)

=== As editor ===
- Apenas un delincuente (1949)

=== As assistant director ===
- Celos (1946)
