= Candida, Woman of the Year =

1943 film

- Directed by: Enrique Santos Discépolo
- Written by: Manuel Meaños, Marcelo Menasche
- Starring: Niní Marshall; Augusto Codecá; Carlos Morganti
- Cinematography: Alberto Etchebehere, Antonio Merayo
- Edited by: Rosalino Caterbeti
- Music by: Bert Rosé
- Release date: February 23, 1943
- Running time: 73 minutes
- Country: Argentina
- Language: Spanish

Candida, Woman of the Year (Spanish: Cándida, la mujer del año) is a 1943 Argentine comedy film of the classical era directed by Enrique Santos Discépolo and starring Niní Marshall, Augusto Codecá, and Carlos Morganti.

== Cast ==
- Niní Marshall ... Cándida
- Augusto Codecá
- Carlos Morganti
- Julio Renato
- Alfredo Jordan
- Edna Norrell
- Blanca Vidal
- Lalo Malcolm
- Carlos Bellucci
