= Apasionadamente =

- Directed by: Luis César Amadori
- Written by: Enrique Vico Carré
- Starring: Enrique Chaico; Ada Cornaro
- Release date: 1944
- Country: Argentina
- Language: Spanish

Apasionadamente (English language:Passionately) is a 1944 Argentine romantic comedy film of the classical era of Argentine cinema directed by Luis César Amadori and written by Enrique Vico Carré.

== Cast ==
- Enrique Chaico
- Ada Cornaro
- Rafael Frontaura
- Pedro López Lagar
- José Maurer
- Zully Moreno
- Juan José Piñeiro
