= Héctor Méndez (actor) =

Argentine actor

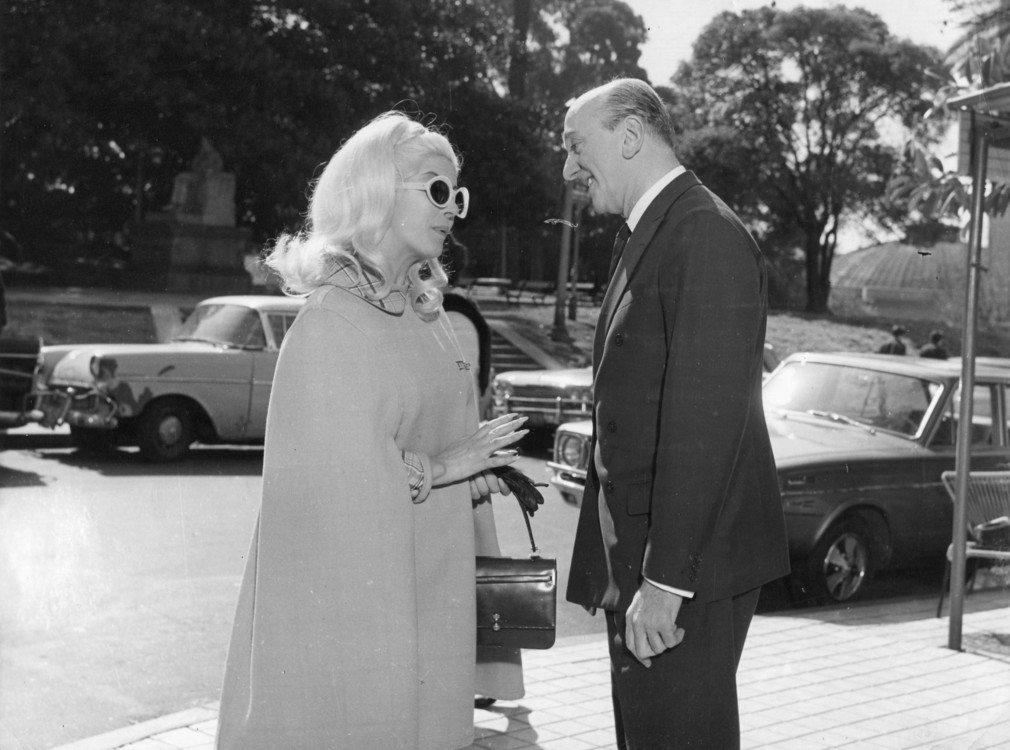
- Libertad Leblanc and Héctor Méndez in the film Deliciously Amoral.
- Born: 1913; Argentina
- Died: 28 March 1980 (aged 66–67); Mar del Plata, Argentina
- Occupation: Actor
- Years active: 1938–1980 (film)

Héctor Méndez (1913–1980) was an Argentine film actor.

== Selected filmography ==
- Three Argentines in Paris (1938)
- Our Land of Peace (1939)
- Huella (1940)
- Where Words Fail (1946)
- Cosas de mujer (1951)
- Detective (1954)
- Crimen sin olvido (1968)
- Deliciously Amoral (1969)

== Bibliography ==
- Peter Cowie & Derek Elley. World Filmography: 1967. Fairleigh Dickinson University Press, 1977.
