= With Broken Wings =

Con las alas rotas
- Directed by: Orestes Caviglia
- Release date: 1938
- Running time: 80 minute
- Country: Argentina
- Language: Spanish

With Broken Wings (Spanish: Con las alas rotas) is a 1938 Argentine drama film directed by Orestes Caviglia during the Golden Age of Argentine cinema. The film premiered in Buenos Aires.
