= Veraneo en Mar del Plata =

- Directed by: Julio Saraceni
- Written by: Maximo Aguirre
- Cinematography: Antonio Merayo
- Edited by: José Serra
- Music by: Tito Ribero
- Distributed by: Argentina Sono Film
- Release date: 1954
- Running time: 78 minutes
- Country: Argentina
- Language: Spanish

Veraneo en Mar del Plata is a 1954 Argentine musical comedy film directed by Julio Saraceni during the classical era of Argentine cinema. It was shot and set in Mar del Plata, in Buenos Aires Province.

== Cast ==
- Jorge Luz
- Rafael Carret
- Guillermo Rico
- Zelmar Gueñol
- Ramón J. Garay
- María del Río
- Carlos Barbetti
- Osvaldo Domecq
- María Esther Corán
- Nelly Prince
