= At the Sound of the Bugle =

1941 film

Al toque de clarín
- Cast
- Directed by: Orestes Caviglia
- Written by: Florencio Chiarello
- Produced by: Orestes Caviglia
- Starring: Rafael Buono; Salvador Striano
- Cinematography: Alberto Etchebehere
- Edited by: Jorge Gárate
- Distributed by: Argentina Sono Film
- Release date: 16 July 1941
- Running time: 70 minutes
- Country: Argentina
- Language: Spanish

At the Sound of the Bugle (Spanish: Al toque de clarín) is a 1941 Argentine film of the Golden Age of Argentine cinema, directed by Orestes Caviglia and written by Florencio Chiarello. The film starred Ramón Garay and Enrique Giacovino introducing radio comedians Rafael Buono and Salvador Striano.

== Cast ==
Rafael Buono and Salvador Striano

- Ramón Garay
- Enrique Giacovino
- Pepita Muñoz
- José Antonio Paonessa
- Mary Parets
- Iris Portillo
- Oscar Soldati

== Release and acclaim ==
The film premiered on 16 July 1941. Produced and distributed by Argentina Sono Film S.A.C.I.
