= Amor prohibido (film) =

1958 film

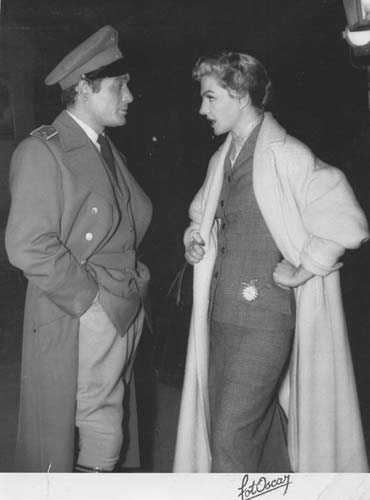
- Jorge Mistral with Zully Moreno
- Directed by: Luis César Amadori
- Written by: Ulises Petit de Murat; Leo Tolstoy (novel)
- Edited by: Jorge Gárate
- Production company: Argentina Sono Film
- Release date: January 16, 1958
- Running time: 99 minutes
- Country: Argentina
- Language: Spanish

Amor prohibido (English: Prohibited Love) is a 1958 Argentine romantic drama film directed by Luis César Amadori and written by Ulises Petit de Murat. The film was based on the novel Anna Karenina by Russian writer Leo Tolstoy.

== Cast ==
- Zully Moreno
- Jorge Mistral
- Santiago Gómez Cou
- Susana Campos
- Beatriz Taibo
- Xénia Monty
- Francisco López Silva
- Miguel Tilli
- Elsa del Campillo
- Pepita Melia
- Elsa del Campillo
- Mariano Vidal Molina

== Release ==
The film premiered in Argentina on January 16, 1958.
