= De México llegó el amor =

- Directed by: Richard Harlan
- Written by: Ariel Cortazzo; Conrado de Koller
- Produced by: Establecimientos Filmadores Argentinos
- Starring: Amanda Ledesma; Zully Moreno; Pepita Muñoz; José Olarra
- Edited by: José Cardella
- Music by: Tito Guízar
- Release date: 16 July 1940
- Running time: 85 minutes
- Country: Argentina
- Language: Spanish

De México llegó el amor (English: From Mexico came the love) is a 1940 Argentine black-and-white film of the Golden Age of Argentine cinema, directed by Richard Harlan and written by Ariel Cortazzo and Conrado de Keller. It premiered on July 16, 1940.

== Cast ==
- Amanda Ledesma
- Tito Guízar
- Carlos Bertoldi
- Max Citelli
- Adrián Cúneo
- Tito Gómez
- Zully Moreno
- Pepita Muñoz
- José Olarra
- José Olivero
- Margarita Padín
- Fernando Ponchel
- Mirtha Reid
- Adelaida Soler
- Armando de Vicente
- Pepe Biondi
