= The Kidnapper =

- Directed by: Leopoldo Torre Nilsson
- Written by: Beatriz Guido; Leopoldo Torre Nilsson
- Starring: María Vaner; Leonardo Favio; Lautaro Murúa
- Cinematography: Alberto Etchebehere
- Edited by: Jorge Gárate
- Music by: Juan Carlos Paz
- Production company: Argentina Sono Film
- Distributed by: Argentina Sono Film
- Release date: 25 September 1958
- Running time: 75 minutes
- Country: Argentina
- Language: Spanish

The Kidnapper (Spanish: El secuestrador) is a 1958 Argentine drama film directed by Leopoldo Torre Nilsson and starring María Vaner, Leonardo Favio and Lautaro Murúa.

== Cast ==
- María Vaner as Flavia
- Leonardo Favio as Berto
- Lautaro Murúa as Patrick
- Osvaldo Terranova
- Oscar Orlegui as Pelusa
- Carlos López Monet as Gustavo
- A. López Méndez as Bolita
- Beto Gianola
- Jorge Palaz
- Carmen Caballero
- Carmen Giménez
- María Esther Corán
- Mario Savino
- Miguel Cossa
- Yamandú Di Paula
- Rolando Dumas
- Julia Giusti
- José Olivero
- Luis Orbegozo
- Enrique Pinti

== Bibliography ==
- Michael Pigott & Santiago Oyarzabel. World Film Locations: Buenos Aires. Intellect Ltd, 2014.
