= Dark Valley =

- Directed by: Carlos F. Borcosque
- Written by: Carlos F. Borcosque, Jack Hall
- Starring: María Duval
- Cinematography: Antonio Merayo
- Edited by: Nicolás Proserpio
- Music by: Alejandro Gutiérrez del Barrio
- Production company: Argentina Sono Film
- Release date: 1943
- Running time: 90 minutes
- Country: Argentina
- Language: Spanish

Dark Valley (Spanish: Valle negro) is a 1943 Argentine film of the classical era of Argentine cinema directed by Carlos F. Borcosque.

== Cast ==
- María Duval
- Carlos Cores
- Nélida Bilbao
- Elisardo Santalla
- Leticia Scury
- Enrique García Satur
- Juan Sarcione
- Ada Cornaro
- Rossina Grassi
- Edgardo Morilla
- Enrique Chaico
