= The Life of Carlos Gardel =

- Poster
- Directed by: Alberto de Zavalía
- Written by: Carlos Aden; Óscar Lanata; Last Reason; Alberto de Zavalía
- Starring: Hugo del Carril; Delia Garces; Elsa O'Connor; Juana Sojo
- Cinematography: Alberto Etchebehere
- Edited by: Nicolás Proserpio
- Music by: Alfredo Malerba; Mario Maurano
- Production company: Argentina Sono Film
- Distributed by: Argentina Sono Film
- Release date: 24 May 1939
- Running time: 107 minutes
- Country: Argentina
- Language: Spanish

The Life of Carlos Gardel (Spanish: La vida de Carlos Gardel) is a 1939 Argentine musical film of the Golden Age of Argentine cinema directed by Alberto de Zavalía and starring Hugo del Carril, Delia Garces and Elsa O'Connor.

== Production ==
The film premiered in Buenos Aires on May 24, 1939. It is a biopic, portraying the life of the French-born tango singer Carlos Gardel (1890-1935) who became a popular film star in Argentina and the United States. The film was a major success, due largely to the lasting popularity of Gardel following his sudden death in an airplane crash four years before. The film boosted the careers of its stars, and was part of what became known as the Golden Age of Argentine Cinema.

== Cast ==
- Hugo del Carril as Carlos Gardel
- Delia Garcés as Teresa
- Elsa O'Connor as Dorina
- Miguel Gómez Bao as Garabito
- Juana Sujo as Betty
- Santiago Gómez Cou
- Armando de Vicente as Pedro
- Alberto Terrones as Martinez
- Mario Pardo as Rengo Bazan
- Salvador Lotito
- Agustín Barrios
- Egle Foropón
- Herminia Mancini
- Carlos Bertoldi
- Amelia Lamarque
- Pedro Bibe
- Percival Murray
- José Herrero

== Bibliography ==
- Finkielman, Jorge. The Film Industry in Argentina: An Illustrated Cultural History. McFarland, 2003.
- Rist, Peter H. Historical Dictionary of South American Cinema. Rowman & Littlefield, 2014.
