= La Casa del recuerdo =

- Release date: 1940
- Country: Argentina
- Language: Spanish

La Casa del recuerdo (The House of Memory) is a 1940 Argentine film of the Golden Age of Argentine cinema directed by Luis Saslavsky.

== Cast ==
- Aída Alberti
- María Esther Buschiazzo
- Arturo García Buhr
- Libertad Lamarque
- Mecha López
- Felisa Mary
