= Raúl Soldi =

Argentine painter

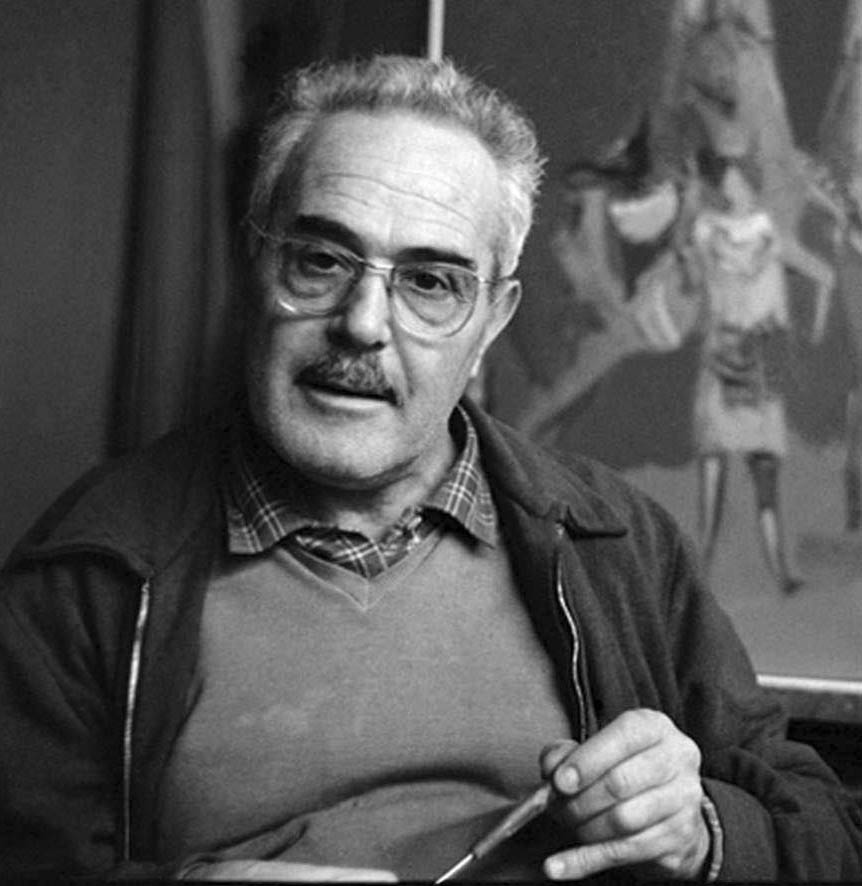
- Soldi at his studio
- Born: 27 March 1905; Buenos Aires, Argentina
- Died: 21 April 1994 (aged 89); Buenos Aires, Argentina
- Known for: Painting

Raúl Soldi (27 March 1905 – 21 April 1994) was an Argentine painter and production designer whose work treated various subjects, including landscapes, portraits, the theater and the circus, and nature. His theatrical figures have a melancholy appearance. He also illustrated poetry books.

== Brief biography ==
Raúl Soldi was born into an artistic family in Buenos Aires in 1905, his father was a cellist and his eldest sister studied piano and singing. He began his studies at the National Academy of Fine Arts, Buenos Aires, Argentina. Still in school, in 1921, he traveled to Europe. He stayed in Germany until 1923, then moved to Italy where he enrolled in the Accademia di Belle Arti di Brera, in Milan, where he remained until 1932. While in Italy, he became involved with groups of vanguard artists.

In 1932, he returned to Argentina and continued to produce oils, watercolors, inks, drawings, lithographs and monocopies.

In 1933, he began to work as cinematographic theatrical designer for national films and continued this work for fifteen years.

In 1941, he was granted a scholarship by the National Commission of Culture and traveled to Hollywood in the United States. He stayed in the U.S.A from 1941 to 1943. In Hollywood, he worked in films as a production designer and scenic designer.

In 1953, he began work upon the murals of the Church of Santa Ana, Glew, Province of Buenos Aires, Argentina – a project that took 23 summers to complete.

In 1966, he redecorated the Cupola of the Teatro Colón of Buenos Aires with several dancers and musicians from old times without receiving any pay of this big project.

In 1968, he travelled to Israel, to paint a fresco in the Basilica of the Anuncición, in Nazareth, a mural inspired by the miracle of the Virgin of Luján.

In 1971, he created a mosaic and painted a mural for the Church of San Isidro Labrador in Buenos Aires.

In 1973, his work Santa Ana and the Virgin was included in the Collection of Modern and Contemporary Art, Vatican Museums, in the South American room.

In 1979, his mural Santa Fiorentina was incorporated in the Cathedral of the city of Campana, province of Buenos Aires, Argentina.

In 1989, he created the mosaic Camerata Bariloche, for the Museum of the Park of Portofino, Italy.

== Paintings ==
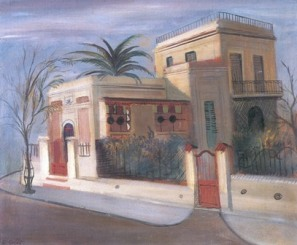
Landscape of Villa Ballester (1935)

Soldi's paintings include:

- The Hammock (1933)
- Landscape of Villa Ballester (1935)
- Sarita (1947)
- The Musicians (1956)
- The Greeting (1957)
- Naked with Doves (1957)
- Diego with Dancer Suit (1958)
- The Kiss (1960)
- The Tango in Paris (1963)

== Awards ==
During his lifetime, Soldi received numerous awards, including:

1933: First Prize at the Conjuntoen XIX the Hall Watercolorists of Buenos Aires and a Silver Medal in the International Exposition of San Francisco.

1936: Gold Medal in the Hall Rosary, Santa Fe.

1937: Prizes at the International Exhibition of Paris and the XXIVth Hall Watercolorists of Buenos Aires.

1942: Figures gains Third Prize in the National Hall.

1943: Prizes in the Biennial of San Pabloy in the National Hall Artists Decorators (Gold medal Argentina).

1944: Dancing Young Person gains the Sívori Prize granted by the National Hall.

1947: First Prize in the National Hall.

1948: First Prize of the Biennial of San Pablo.

1949: Woman combing to her daughter gains the Great Prize of Honor in the National Hall.

1952: The Palanza Prize of the National Academy of Beautiful Arts, of which he was member.

1960: Mention of Honor in II the Biennial of Mexico.

1985: Declared 'illustrious citizen' of the city of Buenos Aires, Argentina.

== Museums and exhibitions ==
From 1930, Soldi's work was displayed in the National Hall Culture, and in diverse provincial Halls throughout Argentina. Internationally, his work was displayed in the International Expo of San Francisco (1933), International Exhibition of Paris (1937), in New York (1941–1943) and in exhibitions throughout Romania in 1970.

In 1992, 210 of Soldi's works were displayed in The History of Argentina exhibition at the National Rooms of Culture, Argentina. Half million people attended the exhibition, setting a record for an Argentine artist.

Raúl Soldi's work is represented in the main museums and art galleries of the world, including the Museum of Modern Art of New York (MOMA), Florence and the Gallery of Modern Art in Milan.

== Tribute ==
On 27 March 2019, search engine Google commemorated Raúl Soldi with a Doodle on his 114th birth anniversary.

== Selected filmography ==
- Goal (1936)
- Girls Orchestra (1941)
- Carmen (1943)
- The Corpse Breaks a Date (1944)
