= Gori Muñoz =

Argentine art director (1906–1978)

- Born: 26 July 1906; Valencia, Spain
- Died: 23 August 1978 (aged 72); Buenos Aires, Argentina
- Other name: Gregorio Muñoz Montoro
- Occupation: Art director
- Years active: 1941-1973 (film)

Gori Muñoz (1906–1978) was a Spanish-born Argentine art director. He worked on many films including The Phantom Lady (1945).

== Selected filmography ==
- The Phantom Lady (1945)
- The Three Rats (1946)
- The Sin of Julia (1946)
- Nacha Regules (1950)
- The Beautiful Brummel (1951)
- The Unwanted (1951)
- Don't Ever Open That Door (1952)
- The Tunnel (1952)
- The Lady of the Camellias (1953)
- Spring of Life (1957)
- Había una vez un circo (1972)

== Bibliography ==
- Rist, Peter H. & Barnard, Timothy. South American Cinema: A Critical Filmography, 1915-1994 Routledge, 2013.
