= Orestes Caviglia =

Argentine actor and director

Orestes Caviglia (Spanish pronunciation: [oˈɾestes kaˈβiɣlja]; November 9, 1893 in Buenos Aires – April 1, 1971 in Tucumán) was an Argentine film actor and film director of the Golden Age of Argentine cinema.

He appeared in films such as La cabalgata del circo 1945 and Albergue de mujeres 1946.

Much of his work as a director was at the beginning of his career in the late 1930s and early 1940s. He directed Al toque de clarín in 1941.

== Filmography ==
=== Actor ===
- Octavo infierno, El (1964)
- Paula cautiva (1963) .... Florencio Peña, The Paula's Grandfather
- Acosados, Los (1960) (TV)
- Jefe, El (1958)
- Cielo en las manos, El (1950)
- De padre desconocido (1949)
- Cuna vacía, La (1949)
- Nace la libertad (1949) (as Oreste Caviglia)
- Pelota de trapo (1948) .... Professor Guillén
- Tierra del fuego (1948)
- Nunca te diré adiós (1947)
- Albergue de mujeres (1946)
- Rosa de América (1946)
- The Circus Cavalcade (1945)
- His Best Student (1944)
- Casa de muñecas (1943)
- Malambo (1942)
- En el viejo Buenos Aires (1942)
- Maestrita de los obreros, La (1941)
- Vez en la vida, Una (1941)
- Huella (1940)
- Cita en la frontera (1940)
- Pobre Pérez, El (1937)
- Viento norte (1937)
- Melgarejo (1937) .... Carlos Bertolini
- Cadetes de San Martín (1937)
- Palermo (1937)
- Porteña optimista, Una (1937)
- Tararira (1936)

=== Director ===
- Mis cinco hijos (1948)
- Al toque de clarín (1941)
- Hay que casar a Ernesto (1941)
- Pueblo chico, infierno grande (1940)
- Matrero, El (1939)
- Con las alas rotas (1938)
