= Ramón Garay =

Spanish actor

Ramón J. Garay (1896–1956) was a Spanish film actor who appeared in the Cinema of Argentina in the classic era of the 1940s and 1950s. Although a familiar face of the period in films he didn't enter film until the age of 45.

He appeared in over 30 films between 1941 and his death in 1956 as a character actor, starring in films such as Al toque de clarín (1941), Buenos Aires a la vista and Al compás de tu mentira (1950), Con la música en el alma (1951), Amor a primera vista (1956) and Novia para dos (1956).

== Career ==
He performed in Argentina in amateur theater and later with the companies of Antonia Herrero, Enrique Serrano, Ana Lasalle, Olinda Bozán, and Luis Arata. With the company directed by Juan Carlos Thorry, he worked in 1951 in the play Crimen en borrador by Julio Porter and Raúl Gurruchaga at the El Ateneo Grand Splendid.

In 1952, he joined the cast led by Lolita Torres and Juan Carlos Mareco in the play Ladroncito de mi alma at the Grand Splendid Theater. Garay also worked in revue-style plays both in Buenos Aires and on tours throughout the country.

He made his film debut in 1941 and in the mid-1950s rose to popularity in the role of detective Saporiti in films starring Lolita Torres and directed by Julio Saraceni: La mejor del colegio (1953) and Más pobre que una laucha (1955). He worked with the same actress in La edad del amor (The Age of Love, 1954), in the role of businessman Mendiondo, and in Amor a primera vista (Love at First Sight) and Novia para dos (Bride for Two), both from 1956. He also acted alongside the Cinco Grandes del Buen Humor (Five Greats of Good Humor) in Veraneo en Mar del Plata(Summer in Mar del Plata, 1954).

== Selected filmography ==
- María Rosa (1946)
- El Muerto es un vivo (1953)
- The Age of Love (1954)
