= Madrugada (film) =

- Release date: 1957
- Running time: 85 minute
- Country: Spain
- Language: Spanish

Madrugada is a 1957 Spanish film directed by Antonio Roman and starring Argentine actress Zully Moreno.
