= Red Blossoms =

1940 Argentine comedy film by Edmo Cominetti

Azahares rojos
- Directed by: Edmo Cominetti
- Written by: Edmo Cominetti
- Starring: Mecha Caus; Antuco Telesca
- Release date: 1940
- Country: Argentina
- Language: Spanish

Red Blossoms (Spanish: Azahares rojos) is a 1940 Argentine comedy film of the Golden Age of Argentine cinema directed by and written by Edmo Cominetti. The film starred Mecha Caus and Antuco Telesca.

== Cast ==
- Vicente Álvarez
- Mecha Cobos
- Justo Garaballo
- Elisa Labardén
- Mecha López
- Juan José Piñeiro
- Juan Siches de Alarcón
- Enrique Vico Carré
- Zully Moreno

== Release ==
The film premiered in Argentina in October 1940.
