= Cándida (1939 film) =

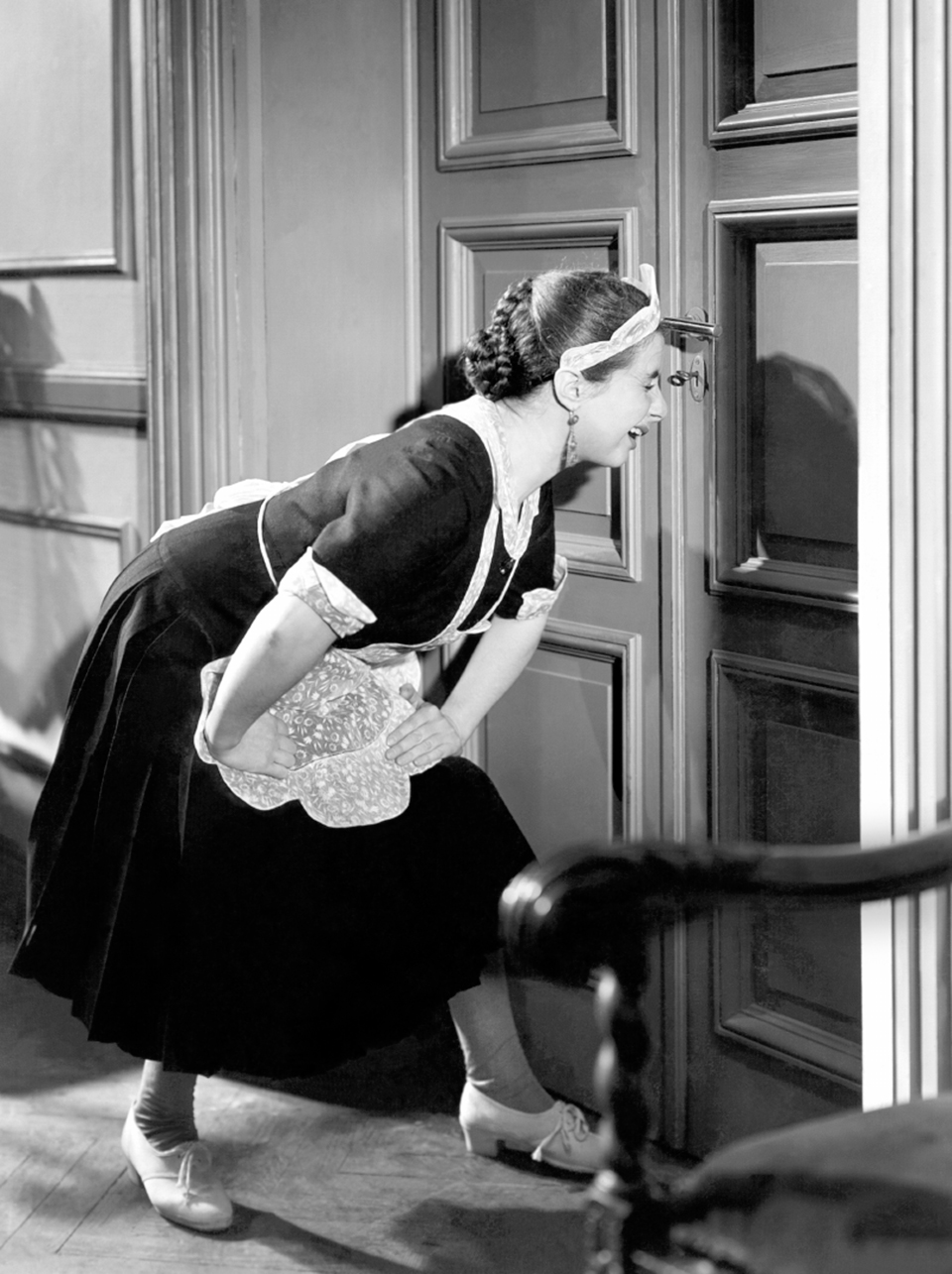
- Still with Niní Marshall
- Directed by: Luis Bayon Herrera
- Written by: Luis Bayon Herrera
- Produced by: Luis Bayon Herrera
- Release date: 1939
- Country: Argentina
- Language: Spanish

Cándida is a 1939 Argentine musical film drama directed by Luis Bayon Herrera during the Golden Age of Argentine cinema. The tango film premiered in Buenos Aires, and starred Juan Carlos Thorry.

== Plot ==
Cándida Villar is a clumsy Galician maid who speaks improperly, get a lot of troubles in all the conversations with her bosses, simple and straightforward who from night to morning becomes the most lucky woman of the word because she met a hilarious gallery of character in an art gallery.

== Cast ==
- Niní Marshall as Cándida
- Augusto Codecá as Jesús
- Juan Carlos Thorry as Dr. Adolfo Sánchez
- Tulia Ciámpoli as Esther
- César Fiaschi as Dr. Luis Giménez
- Adolfo Stray as Jacobo
- Nélida Bilbao as La dactilógrafa
- Lita Fernand as Julia
- Chiche Gicovatte as Julia
- Cielito as Pepito
- S. Tortorelli as Pepito
- L.S. Pereyra as Augustito
- Pedro González as El médico
- Armando Durán as Agenciero
- A. Porzio as El patotero
