= Adolfo Linvel =

Argentine actor (1911–1986)

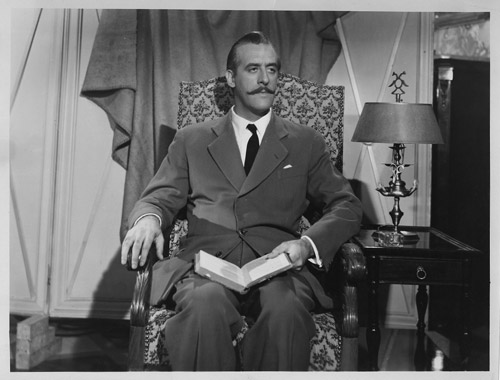
- Linvel in The Cat (directed by Mario Soffici)
- Born: 1911; Argentina
- Died: July 8, 1986 (aged 74–75)
- Occupation: Actor

Adolfo Linvel (1911 – July 8, 1986) was an Argentine actor. He starred in the 1950 film Arroz con leche under director Carlos Schlieper. He gained widespread fame in the role of the father of Los Campanelli, a popular Argentine TV sitcom in the 1970s.

== Selected filmography ==
- Isabelita (1940)
- Saint Candida (1945)
- Madame Sans-Gêne (1945)
- Valentina (1950)
- The New Bell (1950)
- The Unwanted (1951)
