= Silvia Legrand =

Argentine actress (1927–2020)

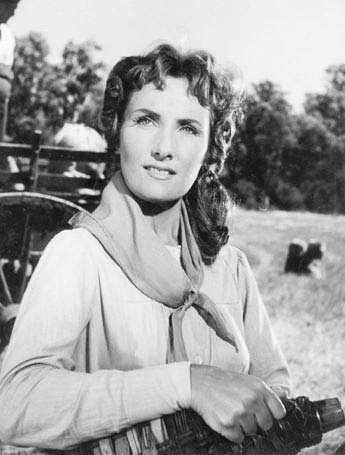
- Legrand in 1959
- Born: María Aurelia Paula Martínez Suárez; 23 February 1927; Villa Cañás, Santa Fe, Argentina
- Died: 1 May 2020 (aged 93); Buenos Aires, Argentina
- Other name: Goldie
- Years active: 1940–1972
- Spouse: Eduardo Lópina (m. 1944; died 2005)
- Children: 2
- Relatives: Mirtha Legrand (twin sister); José A. Martínez Suárez (brother)

María Aurelia Paula Martínez Suárez (23 February 1927 – 1 May 2020), known professionally as Silvia Legrand, was an Argentine actress of the Golden Age of Argentine cinema during the 1940s and 1950s. She was born in Villa Cañás, Santa Fe Province, Argentina. She debuted and co-starred with her twin sister Mirtha Legrand, in a number of films and television programs. She was the sister of director José A. Martínez Suárez. She starred in over 20 films between 1940 and 1972.

== Early life ==
Silvia Legrand was born María Aurelia Paula Martínez Suárez on 23 February 1927 in Villa Cañás, a town in the General López Department of Santa Fe Province, Argentina. She was the twin sister of Rosa María Juana Martínez Suárez, who later became known as Mirtha Legrand, and the younger sister of José Antonio Martínez Suárez, who would become a prominent film director. Their father, José Martínez, died in 1936 when Silvia was nine years old, prompting their mother, Rosa Suárez, a teacher, to relocate the family to Buenos Aires, settling in the La Paternal neighborhood.

== Career ==
=== Early acting career (1940–1944) ===
In Buenos Aires, Silvia and her twin sister Mirtha continued their artistic training at the PAADI academy and the National Conservatory of Scenic Arts. Their first film appearance occurred in 1940 with Hay que educar a Niní (Educating Niní), where they appeared in a few scenes alongside the famous comedian Niní Marshall. The twins' mother had contacted Ricardo Cerebello, a well-known figure in the film industry, to represent her daughters, and it was he who created their stage names: Mirtha Legrand for Rosa and Silvia Legrand for María Aurelia. The sisters gained recognition in 1941 with Soñar no cuesta nada, and they also hosted El club de la amistad on Radio Splendid during this period. They appeared together in several films during the early 1940s, often playing contrasting roles. Their collaboration during this period occurred during the Golden Age of Argentine cinema, when the national film industry was experiencing unprecedented growth and international recognition.

=== Marriage and retirement ===
In 1944, Silvia met Eduardo Lópina, a second lieutenant in the Argentine Army, and decided to abandon her artistic career to marry him. This marked the end of her active participation in the entertainment industry, distinguishing her path from that of her twin sister Mirtha, who continued acting and later became a prominent television host. The couple remained married until Eduardo's death in 2005, and they had two daughters: Gloria Lópina and Mónica Lópina.

=== Later television work (1960s–1972) ===
Despite her early retirement from film, Silvia occasionally returned to acting for television productions during the 1960s and early 1970s. Her television credits included appearances in series such as Silvia muere mañana (1962), Caer en la tentación (1963), Carola y Carolina (1966), and her final professional work in Juan Manuel de Rosas (1972). Her brother-in-law Daniel Tinayre, a prominent film director who married Mirtha Legrand in 1946, may have influenced some of these later television appearances.

== Death ==
Silvia Legrand died on 1 May 2020 at age 93 in her home in Martínez, Buenos Aires Province. According to family sources, she went to take an afternoon nap and did not wake up. The cause of death was not officially disclosed, though it was confirmed she did not have COVID-19. Her death came as another significant loss for Mirtha Legrand, who had already mourned the death of her brother José the previous year.

== Selected filmography ==
Legrand's filmography includes:

- Educating Niní (1940)
- Seven Women (1944)
- Su hermana menor (1943)
- Silvia muere mañana (1962)
- Siete mujeres (1945)
- Los acusados (1960)
