= Luis César Amadori =

Italian-Argentine film director and screenwriter

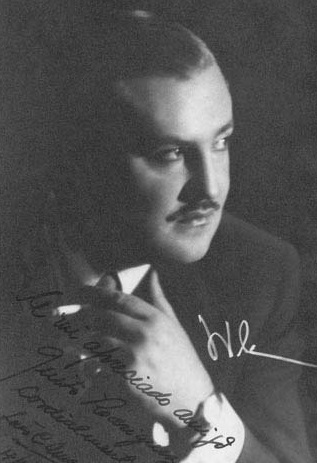
- Born: 28 May 1902; Pescara, Abruzzi, Italy
- Died: 5 June 1977 (aged 75); Buenos Aires, Argentina
- Occupations: Film director Screenwriter
- Years active: 1936–1967

Luis César Amadori (28 May 1902 – 5 June 1977) was an Italian-Argentine film director, screenwriter, and theatre impresario during the Golden Age of Argentine cinema and the heyday of the revista porteña. He directed over 60 films between 1936 and 1967, writing the scripts to over 50 pictures.

Amadori directed films such as Apasionadamente (1944), the critically acclaimed Albéniz (1947) and Alma fuerte (1949).

== Biography ==
Born in Italy, he emigrated to Argentina at the age of five. He began his education at a primary school in Villa Ballester and completed his secondary studies at Colegio De La Salle in Buenos Aires. In 1918, he enrolled in medical studies in Córdoba, but he abandoned them.

Amadori began working with playwright Ivo Pelay at the Teatro Nuevo with an adaptation of a French play titled Un buen muchacho. He later moved to the Teatro Comedia and, eventually, became a long-time manager of the Teatro Maipo, which he purchased in 1940, where he staged dozens of revue productions. He also worked in lyric theatre.

He was chosen by Walt Disney to direct the Spanish-language dubbing of four of Disney's films: Fantasia, Pinocchio, Dumbo, and Bambi. As a screenwriter, Amadori used the pseudonym Gabriel Peña, and as a writer of musical revues he used the name Leo Carter. Close friends called him Gino. Amadori served as a board member of Argentores and worked as a music critic for over 150 theatrical productions as well as several film books. He married Zully Moreno in 1947, and the couple had one son, Luis Alberto Amadori. He died at his home in Buenos Aires on 5 June 1977 at the age of 75.

== Filmography ==
- New Port (1936)
- El pobre Pérez (1937)
- El canillita y la dama (1938)
- Meastro Levita (1938)
- Honeysuckle (1938)
- Palabra de honor (1939)
- Caminito de Gloria (1939)
- El Haragán de la familia (1940)
- Educating Niní (1940)
- Napoleón (1941)
- The Song of the Suburbs (1941)
- Girls Orchestra (1941)
- Soñar no cuesta nada (1941)
- El tercer beso (1942)
- El profesor Cero (1942)
- Bajó un ángel del cielo (1942)
- La mentirosa (1942)
- Ciaro de luna (1942)
- Son cartas de amor (1943)
- Luisito (1943)
- Carmen (1943)
- Apasionadamente (1944)
- Two Angels and a Sinner (1945)
- Madame Sans-Gêne (1945)
- Saint Candida (1945)
- Mosquita muerta (1946)
- Albéniz (1947)
- Una mujer sin cabeza (1947)
- Dios se lo pague (1948)
- Una noche en el Ta-Ba-Rín (1949)
- Don Juan Tenorio (1949)
- Juan Globo (1949)
- Almafuerte (1949)
- Historia de una passion (1950)
- Nacha Regules (1950)
- Pecado (1951)
- María Montecristo (1951)
- Me casé con una estrella (1951)
- Eva Perón inmortal (1952)
- La de los ojos color del tiempo (1952)
- La pasión desnuda (1953)
- El Grito sagrado (1954)
- Caídos en el infierno (1954)
- El barro humano (1955)
- El amor nunca muere (1955)
- Amor prohibido (1958)
- The Violet Seller (1958)
- Una muchachita de Valladolid (1958)
- Una Gran señora (1959)
- Where Are You Going, Alfonso XII? (1959)
- Un trono para Cristy (1960)
- Mi último tango (1960)
- Alerta en el cielo (1961)
- Pecado de amor (1961)
- La Casta Susana (1963)
- El señor de La Salle (1964)
- Como dos gotas de agua (1964)
- Más bonita que ninguna (1965)
- Acompáñame (1966)
- Amor en el aire (1967)
- Un novio para dos hermanas (1967)
- Good Morning, Little Countess (1967)
- Cristina Guzmán (1968)

== Notes ==
- Luis Trelles Plazaola: South American Cinema: Dictionary of Film Makers. La Editorial UPR 1989, ISBN 978-0-8477-2011-8, p. 5 (restricted online copy, p. 5, at Google Books)
- Néstor Pinsón: Luis César Amadori at todotango.com
