= Niní Marshall =

Argentine comedian and actress (1903–1996)

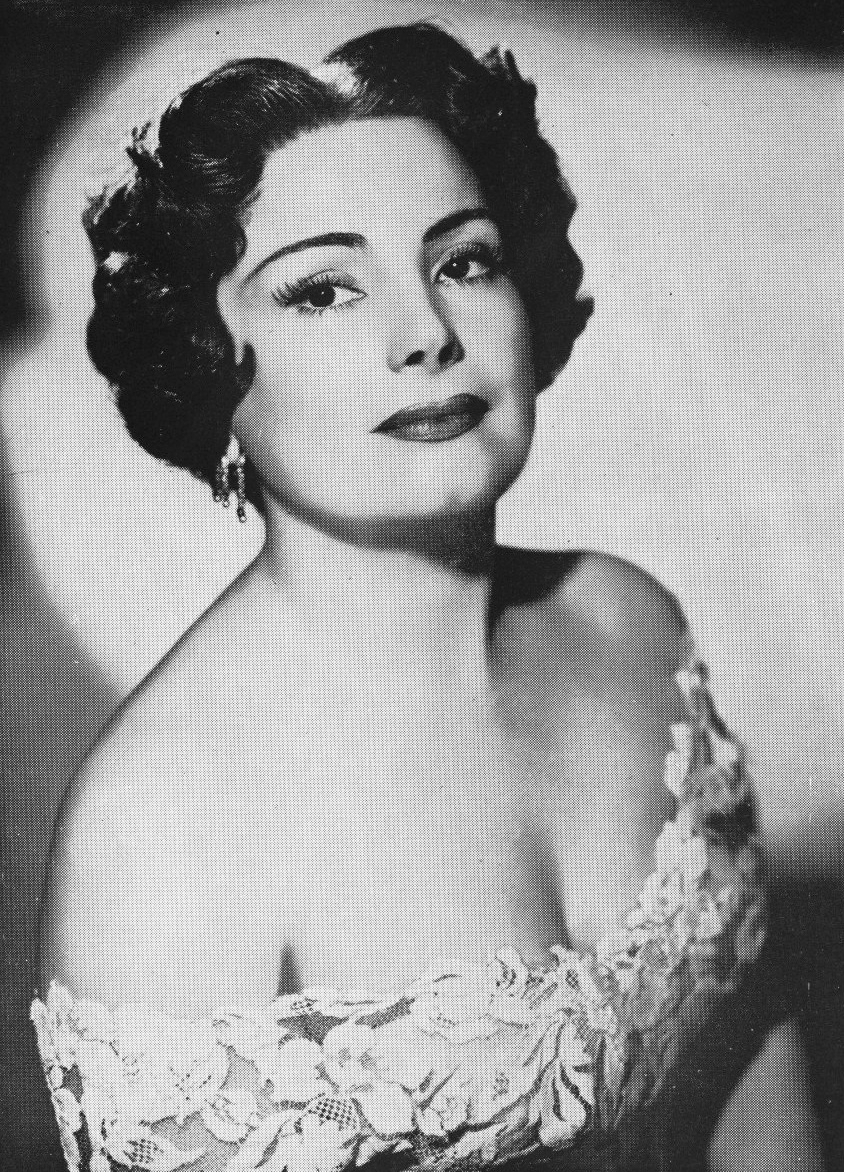
- Niní Marshall in 1954
- Born: Marina Esther Traveso; June 1, 1903; Buenos Aires, Argentina
- Died: March 18, 1996 (aged 92); Buenos Aires, Argentina
- Spouses: Felipe Edelmann (m. 1924) Marcelo Salcedo (m. 1936): Carmelo Santiago

Comedy career
- Medium: Film, music, theatre
- Genre: Character comedy

Marina Esther Traveso (June 1, 1903 – March 18, 1996), known by her stage name Niní Marshall, was an Argentine humorist, comic actress and screenwriter; nicknamed The Chaplin with a skirt and The Lady of Humour.

== Life and work ==
She was born in Buenos Aires to Pedro and María Ángela Traveso, a well-to-do family in 1903. Losing her father at two months of age, she was raised by her mother, who affectionately called her "Niní." They relocated to the Buenos Aires neighborhood of Caballito when Niní was in her teens, and she began a career in advertising. She met Felipe Edelman, an engineer, while in her senior year in secondary school, and they married in 1922, a few months after the birth of their only daughter, Ángeles. The happy occasion was followed by her mother's untimely death, a tragedy compounded by Felipe Edelman's decline into compulsive gambling. Facing economic ruin, the couple were separated shortly afterwards and she remarried.

Traverso drew on her advertising experience and wit to secure work in La Novela Semanal, a well-known women's leisure magazine, in 1933. She also contributed to the radio variety show, Sintonía, as an entertainment critic and publicist until 1934 and appeared in numerous other radio programs. A multi-lingual and prolific writer, she began signing her varied articles as "Mitzi." Traveso debuted as a singer on Radio Municipal in 1936, and met her second husband, the Paraguayan entrepreneur Marcelo Salcedo, at that time. She soon began appearing in Buenos Aires' vibrant theatre, where she developed two satirical characters, Cándida and Catita; by then, she had adopted another pseudonym: "Niní Marshall."

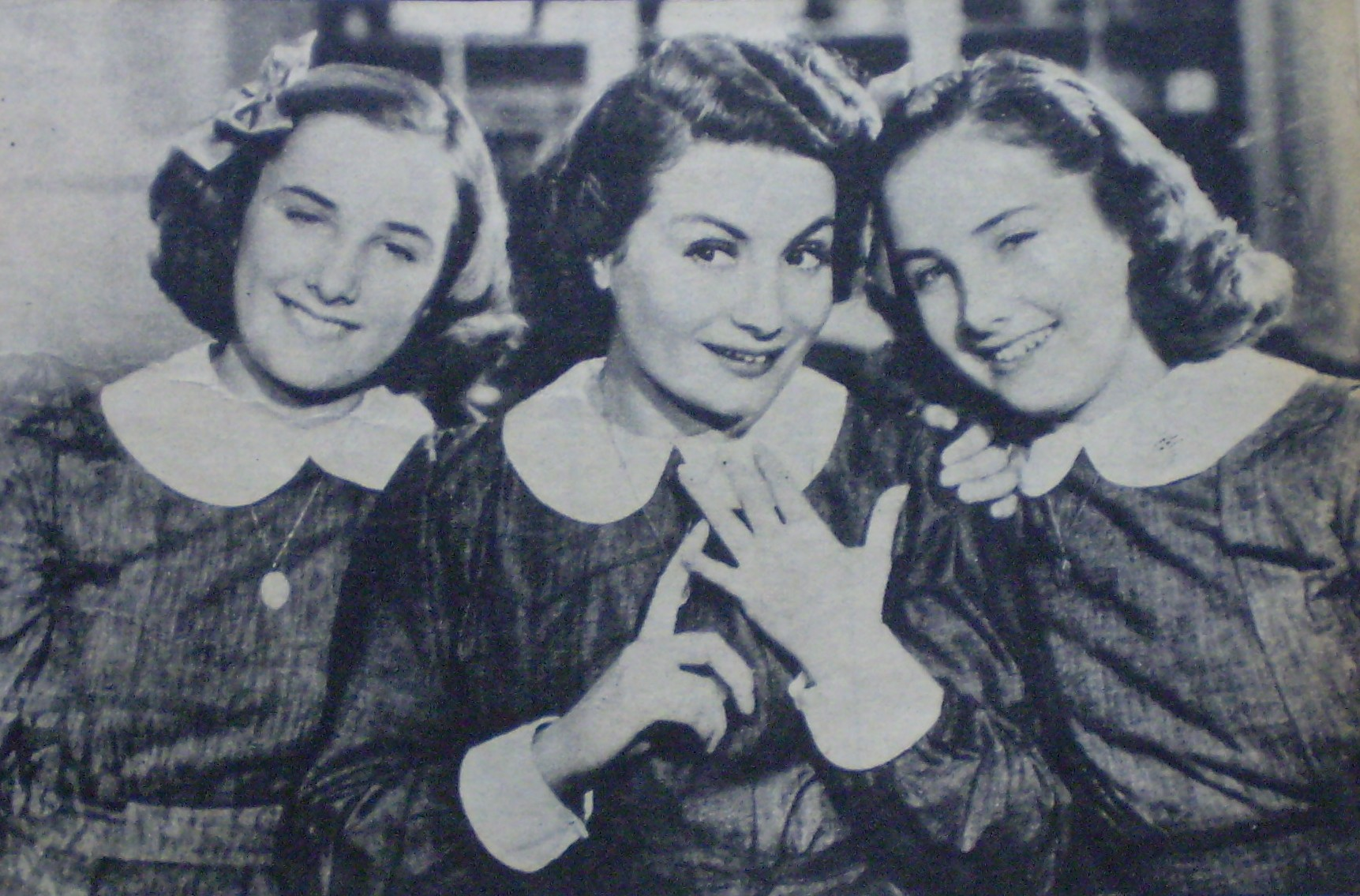
Niní Marshall joins Silvia and Mirtha Legrand in Educating Niní (1940).

These roles led to a prestigious Sensación Radiofónica award in 1937 for her work in Sintonía and to a film deal with Enrique Susini's Lumiton Studios in 1938. Portraying her character "Catita" (an Italian Argentine cook), opposite Mecha Ortiz and Tito Lusiardo (Catita's fastidious employers), in Mujeres que trabajan (Working Women), the comedy's success led to an offer the following year to portray Catita's par, Cándida (an antiquated Galician maid), for which she also wrote the screenplay.

Her thickly-accented characters and use of ethnic humor were not without their detractors, however. The conservative government in power in Argentina at the time ordered her banned from the radio in 1940 and, in 1943, newly installed dictator Gen. Pedro Ramírez had her banned from the cinema, on the charge of "deforming the language," leading to her exile in Mexico. A leading box office draw, she portrayed either Catita or Cándida in numerous more films, as well starring in other notable comedy roles such as Conrado Nalé Roxlo's adaptation of Victorien Sardou's Madame Sans Gêne, in 1945.

Following President Juan Perón's 1955 overthrow, Marshall returned to Argentina and to her comedy standby for her first post-exile role in Julio Saraceni's Catita es una dama (Catita is a Lady, 1956). Continuing to perform in the radio and theatre, she went on to create numerous other comedy characters, among them: Cosme, Doña Caterina, Doña Pola, Mingo, the aristocratic Mónica Bedoya Hueyo de Picos Pardo Unzué Crostón, Niña Jovita, Pedantina, Sabelotodo and Ursilina (all satires of stereotypically Argentine types, and some male). Her work in the theatre helped make household names of young colleagues of hers such as Zully Moreno, Enrique Pinti, Antonio Gasalla and Juan Carlos Altavista, as well making successes of theatre pieces such as Coqueluche (with Thelma Biral) and a 1972 monologue, Y se nos fue redepente (Left Suddenly).

Her last film role starred opposite veteran comic Luis Sandrini in ¡Qué linda es mi familia! (My Family's Beautiful!). The 1980 yarn on a quiet, elderly couple's brush with fame would be the ailing Sandrini's last, as well. She earned a Konex Award in 1981, and retired from show business the following year. She penned her memoirs in 1985 and reemerged in the theatre briefly for a friend, dramatist Antonio Gasalla, in 1988. The acclaimed role earned her a recognition as an Illustrious Citizen of Buenos Aires in 1989. Given the award not by the mayor, but by newly elected President Carlos Menem, he apologized to her for the persecution she endured 40 years earlier. Argentine cinema standards Norma Aleandro and Alfredo Alcón presented her with a Lifetime Achievement Award in 1992 and theatre revivals of her work were produced from 1992 to 1995 locally and in Paris, including two works written in her honor.

The grande dame of Argentine humor to three generations, Niní Marshall died in Buenos Aires in 1996. She was 92.

== Filmography ==
Year	Title	Role	Notes
1938	Women Who Work	Catalina "Catita" Pizzafrola Langanuzzo	
1939	Cándida	Cándida	
1939	Divorce in Montevideo	Catalina "Catita" Pizzafrola Langanuzzo	
1940	Marriage in Buenos Aires		
1940	Honeymoon in Rio		
1940	Educating Niní	Herself	
1940	Los celos de Cándida	Cándida	
1941	I Want to Be a Chorus Girl		
1941	Candida, Millionairess	Cándida	
1941	Girls Orchestra		
1942	La mentirosa	Niní Martínez	
1943	Carmen		
1943	Candida, Woman of the Year	Cándida	
1945	Madame Sans-Gêne	Madame Sans-Gêne	
1945	Saint Candida	Cándida	
1946	Mosquita muerta	Dionisia de Flavigni	
1947	Buenos Aires Sings		
1947	The Headless Woman	Niní	
1947	Christmas with the Poor	Catalina "Catita" Pizzafrola Langanuzzo	
1948	Porteña de corazón	Catalina "Catita" Pizzafrola Langanuzzo	
1949	Mujeres que bailan	Catalina "Catita" Pizzafrola Langanuzzo	
1949	A Galician in Mexico	Cándida	Mexican film
1949	I'm Not Mata Hari	Spanish film	
1950	A Galician Dances the Mambo	Cándida	Mexican film
1950	La alegre casada	Catalina "Catita" Pizzafrola Langanuzzo	Mexican film
1951	Los enredos de una Gallega	Cándida	Mexican film
1952	Mi campeón	Catalina "Catita" Pizzafrola Langanuzzo	Mexican film
1953	Amor de locura	Catalina "Catita" Pizzafrola Langanuzzo	Mexican film
1953	Dios los cría		Mexican film
1955	Una gallega en La Habana	Cándida	Mexican film
1956	Catita es una dama	Catalina "Catita" Pizzafrola Langanuzzo	
1964	Cleopatra Was Candida	Cándida	
1967	Ya tiene comisario el pueblo	Doña Sofocación	
1967	Scandal in the Family	Loli	
1968	Story of a Poor Young Man	Carolina	
1971	Vamos a soñar por el amor	Carolina	
1980	My Family's Beautiful!		
