= Mario Maurano =

Argentine film score composer and pianist

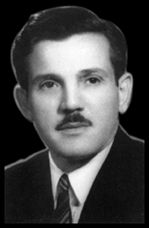
Mario Maurano

Mario Maurano (6 August 1905 - 27 December 1974) was an Argentine film score composer and pianist, best remembered for his tangos. He was especially known for his orchestral work supporting starlet Libertad Lamarque, with songs including Te quiero (1946) and many more. He was a frequent collaborator with director Luis Moglia Barth in the Golden Age of Argentine cinema, and was particularly prolific in the late 1930s and 1940s, composing for films such as Twelve Women (1939), Confesión (1940), Con el dedo en el gatillo (1940), Huella (1940), and Boína blanca (1941). He also worked on films such as Caminito de Gloria (1939) with Luis César Amadori, and La Verdadera victoria (1944) with Carlos F. Borcosque.

== Selected filmography ==
- Paths of Faith (1938)
- The Life of Carlos Gardel (1939)
- Educating Niní (1940)
- Girls Orchestra (1941)
- Saint Candida (1945)
