= Francisco Álvarez (actor) =

Argentine actor (1892-1960)

- Born: December 26, 1892; Buenos Aires, Argentina
- Died: April 21, 1960 (aged 67)
- Years active: 1931 - late 1950s

Francisco Álvarez (December 26, 1892, in Buenos Aires – April 21, 1960, in Lanús) was an Argentine film and theater actor, notable for his work during the Golden Age of Argentine cinema.

Entering film in 1937 he appeared in 54 films between then and his death in 1960, appearing in films, such as Al marido hay que seguirlo with Mapy Cortés and Pedro Quartucci in 1948.

== Selected filmography ==
- Educating Niní (1940)
- A Thief Has Arrived (1940)
- The Song of the Suburbs (1941)
- Girls Orchestra (1941)
- Saint Candida (1945)
- Modern Husbands (1948)
- That's the Woman I Want (1951)
