= Mirtha Legrand =

Argentine actress and television host (born 1927)

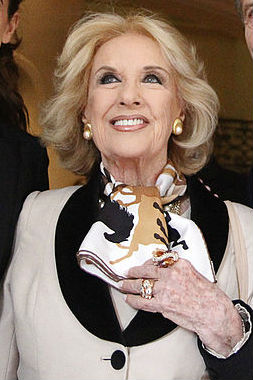
- Mirtha Legrand in 2013
- Born: Rosa María Juana Martínez Suárez; 23 February 1927 (age 99); Villa Cañás, Santa Fe, Argentina
- Other names: Chiquita, La Chiqui
- Occupations: Actress; Presenter
- Years active: 1940–present
- Spouse: Daniel Tinayre (m. 1946; died 1994)
- Children: 2
- Relatives: José A. Martínez Suárez (brother); Silvia Legrand (sister)

Rosa María Juana Martínez Suárez (born 23 February 1927), known by her stage name Mirtha Legrand (Spanish pronunciation: [ˈmiɾta leˈɣɾan]; from the French le grand, "the great"), is an Argentine actress and television presenter. With an 80-year career, Legrand is one of the most recognized entertainment figures in Argentina. Legrand made her leading role debut in Los martes, orquídeas (1941) at only age 14, during the Golden Age of Argentine cinema, with starring roles in the 1940s and 1950s. Legrand appeared in the interview television programme Almorzando con las estrellas (Lunch with the Stars), which first aired in 1968 on Alejandro Romay's Channel 9. The show was later renamed Almorzando con Mirtha Legrand (Having Lunch with Mirtha Legrand).

As of 2026, she is still active, being the host of her current show, La noche de Mirtha (Mirtha's Night), with the same format as previous editions, making her possibly the most veteran active TV host in the world.

== Early life and career ==
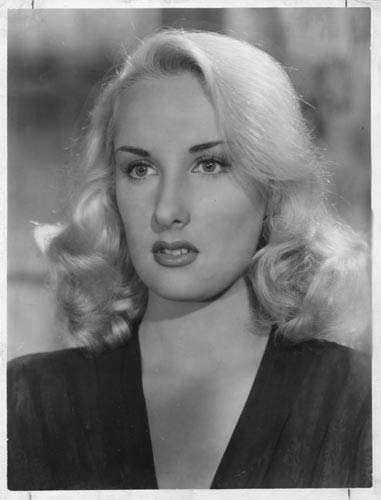
Mirtha Legrand, 1946

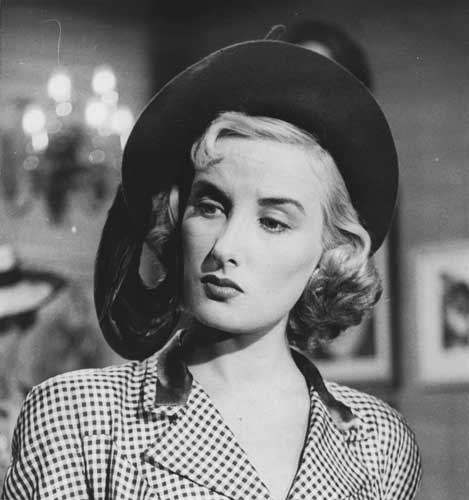
Mirtha Legrand, 1949

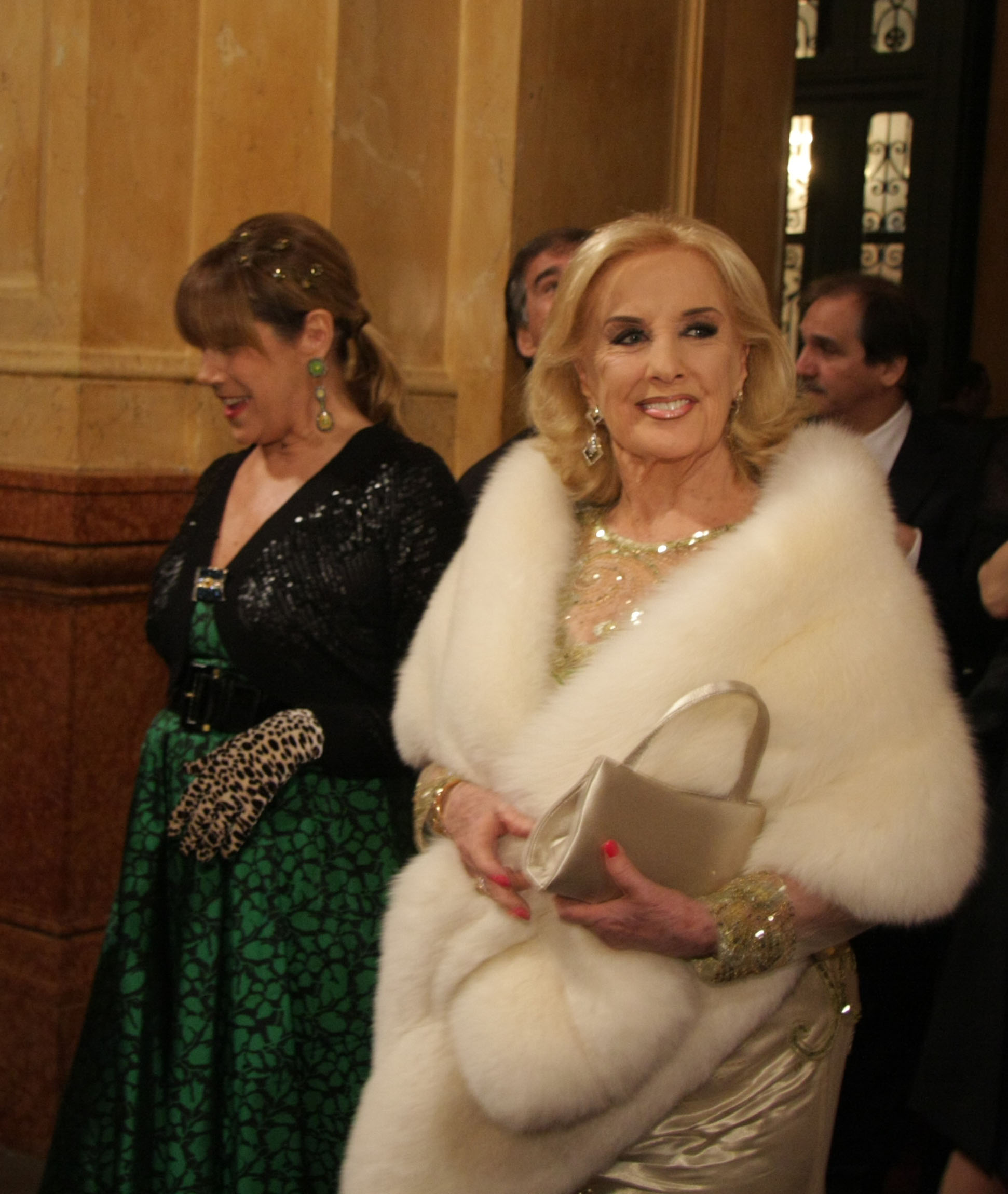
Mirtha in the Teatro Colón in 2010.

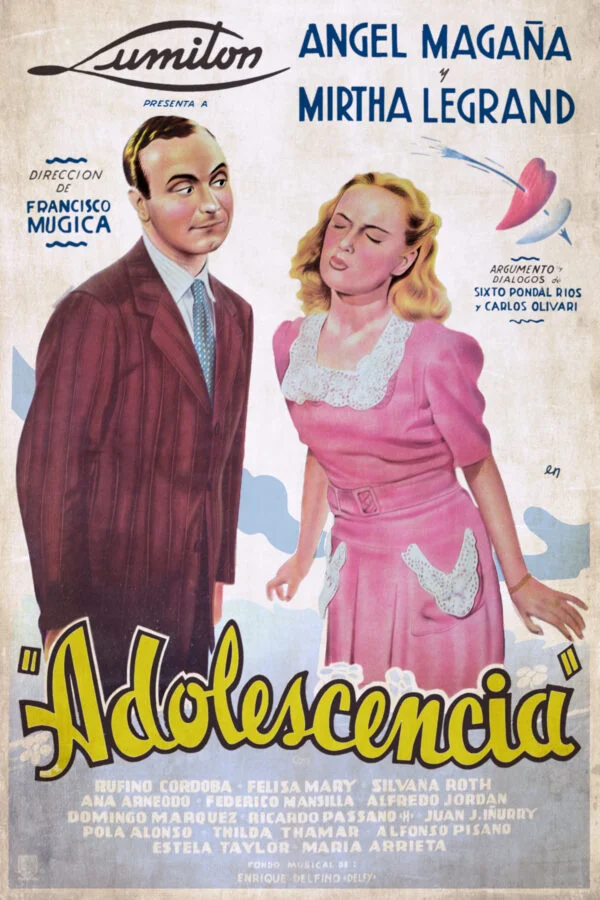
Adolescencia's theatrical release poster (1942)

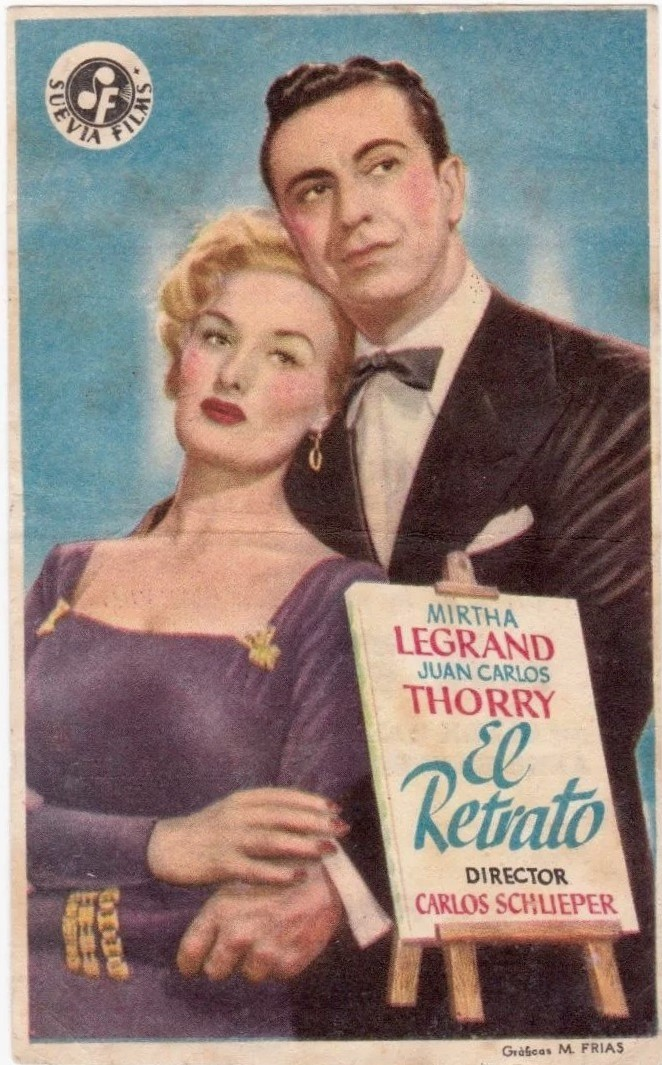
El retrato's theatrical release poster (1948)

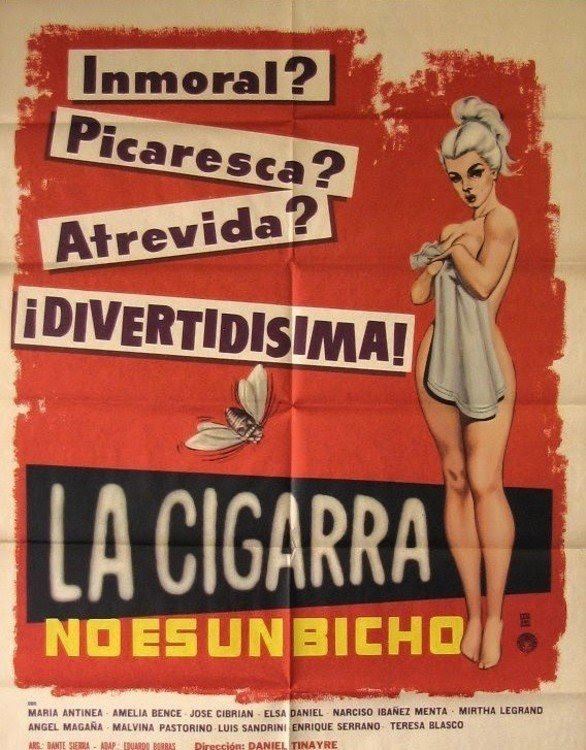
La cigarra no es un bicho's theatrical release poster (1963)

Legrand was born on 23 February 1927 in Villa Cañás. She and her twin sister Silvia were born to José Martínez, a librarian, and Rosa Suárez, a school teacher. They had a sibling named José Antonio. Their parents were Spanish. When they separated in 1934 Rosa moved to Rosario with her three children, where the Legrand sisters took classes of singing and dancing. In 1936 they moved to the La Paternal neighborhood in Buenos Aires.

Legrand began her career in the carnival of 1939 when she participated in a contest organised by the Diario de Cine programme (Cinema Diary) at Belgrano Radio. She rose to fame in the late 1930s and early 1940s, during the golden era of the Argentine film industry that resembled the Hollywood one. Rosa María's stage name Mirtha Legrand was coined by her agent Roberto Cerebello when she was 14 years old. Legrand's film debut was in Educating Niní, which also had the participation of Niní Marshall and Legrand's sister Silvia.

== Personal life ==
While filming Cinco besos in 1945, Legrand met Daniel Tinayre, a director of French origin. Legrand married Tinayre on 18 May 1946. They had two children, Daniel Andrés, born in 1947, and Marcela, born in 1950. Legrand and Tinayre were married until Tinayre's death in 1994. Tinayre had been diagnosed with hepatitis B in September 1994 and died a month later. Their son Daniel died from pancreatic cancer in 1999.

== Selected filmography ==
Her cinematographic career spanned more than 25 years from 1939 to 1965. She participated in 36 films of Argentina and Spain, including:

- 1940: Educating Niní (Spanish: Hay que educar a Niní)
- 1941: Los martes, orquídeas (Spanish: On Tuesdays, orchids)
- 1941: Soñar no cuesta nada (Spanish: To Dream Costs Nothing)
- 1942: Adolescencia (Spanish: Adolescence)
- 1942: Claro de luna (Spanish: Moonlight)
- 1942: El viaje (Spanish: The journey)
- 1943: El espejo (Spanish: The mirror)
- 1943: Safo, historia de una pasión (Spanish: Sappho, Story of a Passion)
- 1944: La casta Susana (Spanish: The Chaste Susanna)
- 1944: La pequeña señora de Pérez (Spanish: The Little Lady of Pérez)
- 1944: Mi novia es un fantasma (Spanish: My Girlfriend is a Ghost)
- 1945: La señora de Pérez se divorcia (Spanish: The Lady of Pérez Gets Divorced)
- 1945: María Celeste (Spanish: Maria Celeste)
- 1946: Un Beso en la Nuca (Spanish: A kiss on the neck)
- 1946: Cinco besos (Spanish: five kisses)
- 1947: 30 segundos de amor (Spanish: 30 Seconds of Love)
- 1947: Como tú lo soñaste (Spanish: Like you dreamed it)
- 1948: El retrato (Spanish: The portrait)
- 1948: Pasaporte a Rio (Spanish: Passport to Rio)
- 1949: La doctora quiere tangos (The Doctor Wants Tangos)
- 1949: Vidalita (Spanish: Vidalita)
- 1950: Esposa último modelo (Spanish: Late Model Wife)
- 1950: La vendedora de fantasías (Spanish: Seller of fantasies)
- 1951: El pendiente (Spanish: The Earring)
- 1952: Doña Francisquita (Spanish: Doña Francisquita)
- 1952: La de los ojos color del tiempo (Spanish: The one with eyes the color of time)
- 1954: Tren internacional (Spanish: International Train)
- 1955: El amor nunca muere (Spanish: Love Never Dies)
- 1956: La pícara soñadora (Spanish: The Dreamy Rogue)
- 1959: En la ardiente oscuridad (Spanish: In the Burning Darkness)
- 1960: La patota (Ultraje) (Spanish: The Gang)
- 1960: Sábado a la noche, cine (Spanish: Saturday Night, Cinema)
- 1962: Bajo un mismo rostro (Spanish: Under The Same Face)
- 1964: La cigarra no es un bicho (Spanish: The Cicada is Not a Bug)
- 1965: Con gusto a rabia (Spanish: With Taste of Rage)

== Awards ==
=== Nominations ===
- 2013 Martín Fierro Awards
  - Best female TV host
