= Alberto Etchebehere =

Argentinian cinematographer (1903–1965)

- Born: 1903; Buenos Aires, Argentina
- Died: 1965 (aged 61–62); Buenos Aires, Argentina
- Occupation: Cinematographer
- Years active: 1930-1965 (film)

Alberto Etchebehere (1903–1965) was an Argentine cinematographer.

== Selected filmography ==
- Streets of Buenos Aires (1934)
- The Life of Carlos Gardel (1939)
- My Country's Wings (1939)
- Educating Niní (1940)
- At the Sound of the Bugle (1941)
- The Song of the Suburbs (1941)
- Girls Orchestra (1941)
- The Third Kiss (1942)
- Carmen (1943)
- Candida, Woman of the Year (1943)
- Saint Candida (1945)
- Two Angels and a Sinner (1945)
- María Rosa (1946)
- Christmas with the Poor (1947)
- The Headless Woman (1947)
- Story of a Bad Woman (1948)
- God Reward You (1948)
- Nacha Regules (1950)
- The Fan (1951)
- The Orchid (1951)
- This Is My Life (1952)
- The Beast Must Die (1952)
- The Count of Monte Cristo (1953)
- The Kidnapper (1958)
- Thirst (1960)

== Bibliography ==
- Ann Davies & Phil Powrie. Carmen on Screen: An Annotated Filmography and Bibliography. Tamesis Books, 2006.
