= Antonio Merayo =

Argentine photographer

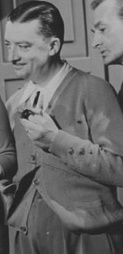
- Antonio Merayo-fotógrafo
- Born: 19 August 1909; Argentina
- Died: 27 April 1999 (aged 89)
- Occupation: Cinematographer
- Years active: 1930–1987 (film)

Antonio Merayo (19 August 1909 – 27 April 1999) was an Argentine cinematographer.

== Selected filmography ==
- Autumn Roses (1931)
- Palermo (1937)
- Cadetes de San Martín (1937)
- The Good Doctor (1939)
- Girls Orchestra (1941)
- Malambo (1942)
- Candida, Woman of the Year (1943)
- Dark Valley (1943)
- 24 Hours in the Life of a Woman (1944)
- Saint Candida (1945)
- The Songstress (1946)
- Cristina (1946)
- The Three Musketeers (1946)
- Passport to Rio (1948)
- The Tango Returns to Paris (1948)
- The Bohemian Soul (1949)
- The Unwanted (1951)
- The Tunnel (1952)
- The Lady of the Camellias (1953)
- Alejandra (1956)
- Behind a Long Wall (1958)
- The Last Floor (1962)
- Would You Marry Me? (1967)
- La Cama (1968)
- Había una vez un circo (1972)
- The Kids Grow Up (1976)

== Bibliography ==
- Peter Cowie & Derek Elley. World Filmography: 1967. Fairleigh Dickinson University Press, 1977.
