= Argentina Sono Film =

Entertainment company based in Buenos Aires

Argentina Sono Film S.A.C.I. is an entertainment company based in Buenos Aires that was one of the most important studios during the Golden Age of Argentine cinema of the 1930s–1950s, as well as the only one to have survived the period. In its current format, it serves as a production and distribution company.

== History ==
=== First decade, founding and development ===
Luis José Moglia Barth, the director of several films in the silent era, made a proposition to Ángel Mentasti, a prominent businessman in the film industry, to direct a sound feature film based around tango; this formed the beginnings of Argentina Sono Film. The name of this film was to be ¡Tango!, in which popular figures, already well known by the public, would sing and dance throughout. The stars which Mentasti recruited were: Azucena Maizani, Luis Sandrini, Libertad Lamarque, Mercedes Simone, Tita Merello, Pepe Arias, Alberto Gómez, Alicia Vignoli, Meneca Tailhade and Juan Sarcione. ¡Tango! thus became the first feature film produced by Argentina Sono Film and also marked the beginning of the sound era in Argentine cinema. Within the field of cinematic historiography, certain scholars suggest that other films, making use of the same technology, had already been finished by the time of ¡Tango!; there is no doubt, however, that ¡Tango! was the first sound film to be exhibited. The same year, Dancing (1933) was directed by Luis José Moglia Barth and was also a musical film based around tango; there are no existing copies of the film. In 1955, with the Liberating Revolution, Lucas and Atilio Mentasti, owners of Argentina Sono Films, were arrested.

== Selected list ==
The company has produced over 200 films to date in Argentina.

- ¡Tango!
- 24 Hours in the Life of a Woman
- A hierro muere
- África ríe
- Al toque de clarín
- Alenjndra
- Almafuerte
- Amor a primera vista
- Amor en el aire
- Amor prohibido
- Amor se dice cantando
- ¡Atraco!
- Bajó un ángel del cielo
- Black Ermine
- Boína blanca
- Brigada explosiva
- La caída
- Canario rojo
- Caídos en el infierno
- Chico Viola Não Morreu
- Confesión
- Convivencia
- Corazón de León
- Dagli Appennini alle Ande
- Dancing
- Detrás de un largo muro
- Digan lo que digan
- Dios se lo pague
- Dos tipos con suerte
- Educating Niní (1940)
- End of the Month (1953)
- El bote, el río y la gente
- El Conde de Montecristo
- El dinero de Dios
- El Hincha
- El juramento de Lagardere
- El otro yo de Marcela
- El patio de la morocha
- El secuestrador
- El tango vuelve a París
- El tercer beso
- El túnel
- El vampiro negro
- En la ardiente oscuridad
- Especialista en señoras
- Ésta es mi vida
- Extermineitors II, la venganza del dragón
- Extermineitors III, La gran pelea final
- Fin de mes
- Fragata Sarmiento
- Graciela
- Guacho
- El hermano José
- Hogar, dulce hogar
- Incorregibles
- La casa del recuerdo
- La despedida
- La edad del amor
- La Furia
- La hermosa mentira
- La indeseable
- La mejor del colegio
- La niña del gato
- La orquídea
- La Rubia Mireya
- La vida color de rosa
- Locos suertos en el zoo
- Locuras, tiros y mambos
- Los Bañeros más locos del mundo
- Los extermineitors
- Los hermanos corsos
- Los matamonstruos en la mansión del terror
- Los pilotos más locos del mundo
- Los problemas de Papá
- Los sobrinos del zorro
- The Lady of the Camellias (1953)
- Luna Park (1960)
- Maestro Levita
- María Magdalena
- Mi marido y mi novio
- Más allá del olvido
- Más pobre que una laucha
- Nacha Regules (1950)
- Napoleón
- Novia para dos
- Obras maestras del terror
- Once Upon A Time There Was A Circus
- Oro bajo
- Passport to Rio
- Placeres conyugales
- Pobre pero honrado
- Porteña de corazón
- Procesado 1040
- Riachuelo
- Socios para la aventura
- Soñar no cuesta nada
- Story of a Bad Woman
- Su hermana menor
- Todo el año es Navidad
- Toscanito y los detectives
- Trompada 45
- The Tunnel (1952)
- Un tropezón cualquiera da en la vida
- Una noche en el Ta Ba Rin
- Vacaciones en el otro mundo
- Valle negro
- Veraneo en Mar del Plata
- Vigilantes y ladrones
- Zafra
