= Jorge Gárate =

Argentine film editor

- Born: 12 August 1917; Buenos Aires, Argentina
- Died: 13 May 1990 (aged 72); Argentina
- Occupation: Editor
- Years active: 1939–1983 (film)

Jorge Gárate (1917–1990) was an Argentine film editor.

== Selected filmography ==
- At the Sound of the Bugle (1941)
- Girls Orchestra (1941)
- The Third Kiss (1942)
- Carmen (1943)
- Saint Candida (1945)
- The Songstress (1946)
- Cristina (1946)
- The Headless Woman (1947)
- Christmas with the Poor (1947)
- Passport to Rio (1948)
- God Reward You (1948)
- The Tango Returns to Paris (1948)
- Story of a Bad Woman (1948)
- Nacha Regules (1950)
- The Unwanted (1951)
- The Tunnel (1952)
- The Black Vampire (1953)
- The Count of Monte Cristo (1953)
- The Age of Love (1954)
- The Grandfather (1954)
- Alejandra (1956)
- The House of the Angel (1957)
- The Kidnapper (1958)
- Behind a Long Wall (1958)
- Thirst (1960)
- The Terrorist (1962)
- The Last Floor (1962)
- Cleopatra Was Candida (1964)
- Arm in Arm Down the Street (1966)
- Traitors of San Angel (1967)
- Había una vez un circo (1972)
- My Family's Beautiful! (1980)

== Bibliography ==
- Peter Cowie & Derek Elley. World Filmography: 1967. Fairleigh Dickinson University Press, 1977.
