= Inma Cuevas =

Spanish actress (born 1977)

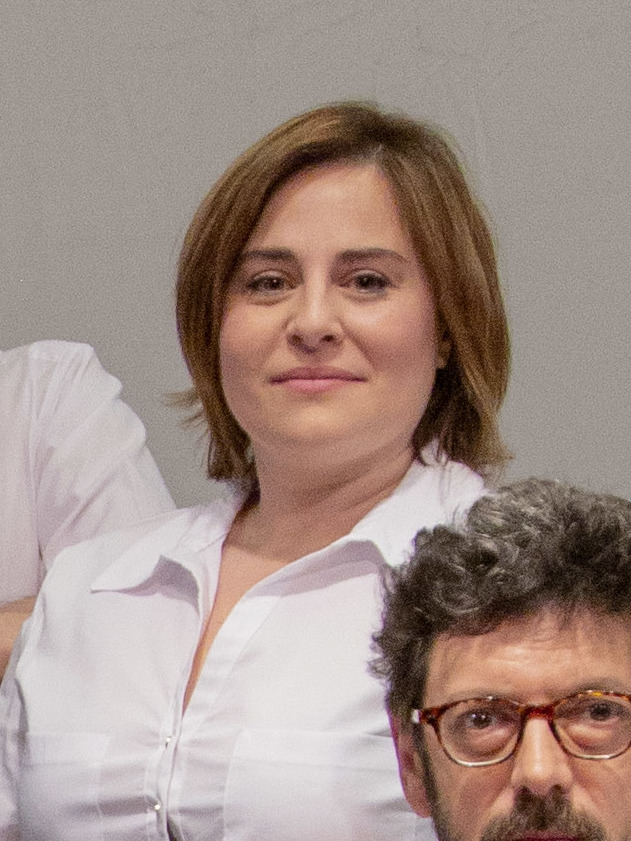
Cuevas in 2019

Inmaculada "Inma" Cuevas Aragón (born 1977) is a Spanish actress. She became well known for her performance as Anabel in the television series Locked Up. Previously known for her stage career.

== Biography ==
Inmaculada Cuevas Aragón was born in 1977 in Madrid. A member of the Aragón family, she is the great-granddaughter of Gabriel Aragón and Virginia Foureaux, granddaughter of Emilio Aragón Foureaux ("Emig") and niece of the clowns Gaby, Fofó and Miliki (Los Payasos de la Tele). She is the cousin of Emilio Aragón ("Milikito").

After studying drama, she landed her first television role in Mujeres. She earned wide spread public recognition after 2015 for her performance in the series Locked Up, in which she played Anabel, a villainous inmate, for three seasons.

== Filmography ==
Film

Year	Title	Role	Notes	Ref.
2017	Toc Toc	Tiffany		
2019	Mientras dure la guerra (While at War)	Felisa		
2021	Poliamor para principiantes (Polyamory for Dummies)	Berta		

Television

Year	Title	Role	Notes	Ref.
2006	Mujeres	Magda		
2009–10	La señora	Rosalía	Introduced in season 2	
2015–19	Vis a vis (Locked Up)	Anabel		
2017	La zona	Fabiana		

== Awards and nominations ==
Year	Award	Category	Work	Result	Ref.
2007	16th Actors and Actresses Union Awards	Best Television Actress in a Secondary Role	Mujeres	Won	
2010	19th Actors and Actresses Union Awards	Best Television Actress in a Minor Role	La señora	Nominated	
2013	22nd Actors and Actresses Union Awards	Best Stage Actress in a Secondary Role	Los últimos días de Judas Iscariote	Nominated	
2014	23rd Actors and Actresses Union Awards	Best Stage Actress in a Secondary Role	Cerda	Won	
2015	24th Actors and Actresses Union Awards	Best Stage Actress in a Leading Role	Constelaciones	Won	
2015	24th Actors and Actresses Union Awards	Best Stage Actress in a Secondary Role	MBIG (Mcbeth International Group)	Nominated	
2016	25th Actors and Actresses Union Awards	Best Television Actress in a Minor Role	Locked Up	Won	
2017	4th Feroz Awards	Best Supporting Actress in a TV Series	Locked Up	Nominated	
2017	26th Actors and Actresses Union Awards	Best Stage Actress in a Secondary Role	Historias de Usera	Won	
2017	26th Actors and Actresses Union Awards	Best Television Actress in a Minor Role	Locked Up	Won	
2018	27th Actors and Actresses Union Awards	Best Film Actress in a Minor Role	Toc Toc	Nominated	
2020	29th Actors and Actresses Union Awards	Best Film Actress in a Secondary Role	While at War	Nominated	
2024	32nd Actors and Actresses Union Awards	Best Stage Actress in a Secondary Role	Chicago. El musical	Pending	
