= Éber Lobato =

Eber Lobato
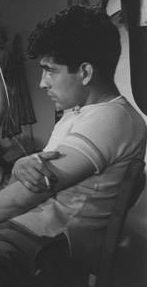
- Eber Lobato in 1958
- Born: Herbert Lobato; March 28, 1931; Pigüé, Argentina
- Died: December 25, 2014 (aged 83); Las Vegas, Nevada, United States
- Spouse: Nélida Lobato ("Sisi")
- Children: Adrián Lobato, Eliset Lobato

Eber Lobato (28 March 1931 – 25 December 2014) was an Argentine actor, director, composer, choreographer, painter, dancer, costume designer, singer, cartoonist, set designer and theater producer.

== Life ==
Eber Lobato was born in Pigüé, Buenos Aires, into a family of artists. His father was the guitarist Adrián Lobato and his mother the singer Mary Lobato.

The origin of his name was because the civil registry employee didn’t know how to write the English name Herbert, which was requested by his English grandmother.

He first worked as an actor, and later as a director of several films during the golden age of Argentine cinema.

At the age of twenty, he joined Alfredo Alaria’s ballet company, and it was he who introduced him to Haydée Nélida Menta (Nélida Lobato), who was entering the world of advertising and who later used his surname to rise to fame. Nélida replaced Eber’s sister, who had been his first dance partner. After 15 days of starting their relationship, Eber proposed marriage to her.

He died on Thursday, December 25, 2014, at the age of 83, of an acute myocardial infarction, while celebrating Christmas with his family in Las Vegas, Nevada, United States.

== Private life ==
He married the actress and vedette Nélida Lobato in 1955, with whom he began his career in Chile and traveled once to Europe, gaining international recognition as a star of the Lido in Paris in 1964, where he was also a choreographer. From that marriage, Adrián Lobato was born, who died unexpectedly at a very young age. After divorcing her in 1962, he married his last wife, Sisi, in 1967, with whom he had his daughter Eliset, and with whom he lived his final years in Las Vegas.

He worked extensively as a choreographer and show producer in the United States and Europe.

== Career ==
=== Films ===
As an actor:

- 1955 - El último perro, with Hugo del Carril and Nelly Meden.
- 1957 - Actuó y compuso El primer beso, directed by Enrique Carreras, with Olga Gatti, Roberto Guthie and Mercedes Carreras.
- 1957 - Venga a bailar el rock, a documentary on rock and roll in Argentina, with Nélida Lobato, Amelita Vargas, Pedrito Rico and Eddie Pequenino.
- 1958 - Nubes de humo, with Héctor Armendáriz, Alberto Castillo and Alberto Bello.
- 1958 - Mientras haya un circo, as an actor, dancer, and composer, alongside Nélida Lobato and Carlos Borsani.
- 1958 - El primer beso
- 1973 - José María y María José: Una pareja de hoy, starring Luis Brandoni and Cristina del Valle.

As a director:

- 1965: Scream of the Butterfly, starring Nélida Lobato.
- 1974: Natasha, as director and writer.

As a choreographer:

- 1957: Venga a bailar el rock
- 1958: Mientras haya un circo
- 1965: Scream of the Butterfly.
- 1973: El mundo Que inventamos, musical comedy.
- 1978: La mamá de la novia, with Libertad Lamarque.

=== Television ===
- 1952: Tropicana Club, musical show with Osvaldo Miranda, Juan Carlos Thorry, Analía Gadé, Tania, Alejandro Maximino, Amelita Vargas, Jovita Luna, Eduardo Farrell, Bobby Capó, Teddy Reno, Marcos Caplán, Beba Bidart, Fidel Pintos and Don Pelele.
- 1954: Gran Hotel Panamá, with Juan Carlos Mareco.
- 1958: Field’s College 1958.
- 1960: Música y fantasía, transmitted by Canal 7, with Nélida Lobato, Tincho Zabala, María Vaner and Pepe Soriano.
- 1969: Espectaculares, with Nélida Lobato.
- 1970: El Ángel Azul
- 1971: El Mundo de Nélida Lobato (1971), with Rodolfo Bebán.
- 1970: A performance by the Spanish singer Raphael in Argentina, broadcast on TV.
- 1977 - El humor de Niní Marshall, segment La bella Loli, with Niní Marshall, Ana María Campoy and José Cibrián.

In 1981, he made a television commercial for Revlon Gitane.

=== Theater ===
In his extensive stage career, his work stands out both as a dancer and choreographer, as well as an actor, composer, and theater director at various theaters such as the Maipo, the Teatro Nacional, and the Comedy Theater. Among his many works, the following stand out:

- El Chúcaro (1948)
- Cabalgata del tango (1954)
- Disloquibamba (1956)
- Ni Militar, ni Marino… El Presidente Argentino (1956)
- Cada loco con su ilusión (1958)
- No aflojes, Arturo (1958)
- ¡La que le espera, excelencia..! (1958)
- ¡Si me dejan estudiar "Io" todo lo voy a arreglar! (1958)
- ¡Esto es Maiporama! (1959)
- Fantasía (1959)
- Buenos Aires de seda y percal (1963)
- Después De Z... Viene P... (1970)
- La carpa del pueblo (1971)
- El Maipazo del año (1971)
- Olga, la hija de aquella princesa rusa (1972)
- Escándalos (1973)
- El despiplume sigue andando (1973)
- Seis rayados en busca de un autor (1974)
- El Maipo... Es el Maipo (1974)
- Dulce... dulce vida (1976)

=== As a singer ===
As a singer, he recorded the singles La Rosa, Aquel Domingo, and Cuando Poco Era Inmenso. With the Odeón Pops label, he released the album No hay boda.
