= Once Upon A Time There Was A Circus =

1972 film directed by Enrique Carreras

Había una vez un circo
- Directed by: Enrique Carreras
- Written by: Enrique Carreras; Abel Santa Cruz
- Produced by: Gori Muñoz
- Starring: Los Payasos de la Tele; Jorge Barreiro; Andrea Del Boca
- Cinematography: Antonio Merayo
- Edited by: Jorge Gárate
- Music by: Tito Ribero
- Production company: Argentina Sono Film
- Release date: August 17, 1972 (Argentina)
- Running time: 100 min.
- Country: Argentina
- Language: Spanish

Once Upon A Time There Was A Circus (Había una vez un circo) is a 1972 Argentine musical comedy film directed by Enrique Carreras, written by Carreras and Abel Santacruz, and starring Gaby, Fofó and Miliki from the trio of Spanish clowns Los Payasos de la Tele. It was scored by Tito Ribero.

== Plot ==
A young girl named Andrea falls ill, but really wants to go to a circus. Her father decides to invite circus performers home so that they can make his daughter feel better. The man is a widower and is planning to marry Carla. Andrea doesn't want him to marry her as she knows that the woman is only interested in his money. The girl runs away from home in protest and her father decides not marry. However, she gets kidnapped by Carla's brother who demands a ransom. Three clowns, Gaby, Fofó and Miliki, decide to rescue the girl.

== Cast ==
- Gaby as himself
- Fofó as himself
- Miliki as himself
- Andrea del Boca as Andrea
- Jorge Barreiro as Sebastián
- Olinda Bozán as Leonor
- Alicia Márquez as Carla
- Mercedes Carreras as Aurelia
- Cristina Alberó as Isabel
- Osvaldo Brandi as Efraín
- Héctor Fuentes as Carla's brother
- Rodolfo Onetto as Don Raúl
- Fofito as himself
- Aurora del Mar as María
- Virginia Romay as Marta
- Puchito
- Carlos Luzzieti
- Aldo Mayo
- Rodolfo Machado
- Mario Savino
