= Emilio Comte =

Argentine film actor (born 1941)

- Born: 15 January 1941 (age 85); Argentina
- Years active: 1956–1998

Emilio Comte (born 15 January 1941) is an Argentine actor who was active between 1956 and 1998. He is best remembered for his role in the popular Argentine telenovela La familia Falcón.

== Career ==
In 1956, Comte made his film debut in Ignacio Tankele's Prohibido para menores opposite Francisco de Paula, Diana Myriam Jones and Noemí Laserre. In 1971 he starred in Enrique Carreras's Aquellos años locos opposite Palito Ortega and Mercedes Carreras.

Comte was the voice of "Cachito", the children's character of the popular radio program Los Pérez García. Later, in 1957 he worked in the comedy ¡Son cosas de esta vida! which, like the previous one, was broadcast on Radio El Mundo.

== Personal life ==
On November 24, 1962, Comte married Silvia Merlino, whom he had met in Tovarich, one of the Saturday Theater plays. She was also his co-star in La familia Falcón, and the mother of their four children: Gabriela, Karina, Luciano and Patrick. Merlino died in 2007.

== Filmography ==
- Prohibido para menores (1956)
- Sábado a la noche, cine (1960)
- María M. (1964)
- ¡Qué noche de casamiento! (1969)
- Aquellos años locos (1971)
- La sonrisa de mamá (1972) – Amigo de Julio
- Vivir con alegría (1979) – Federico
- Un loco en acción (1983) – Assistant
