= Jorge Perez Evelyn =

Argentine Actor-singer and dancer

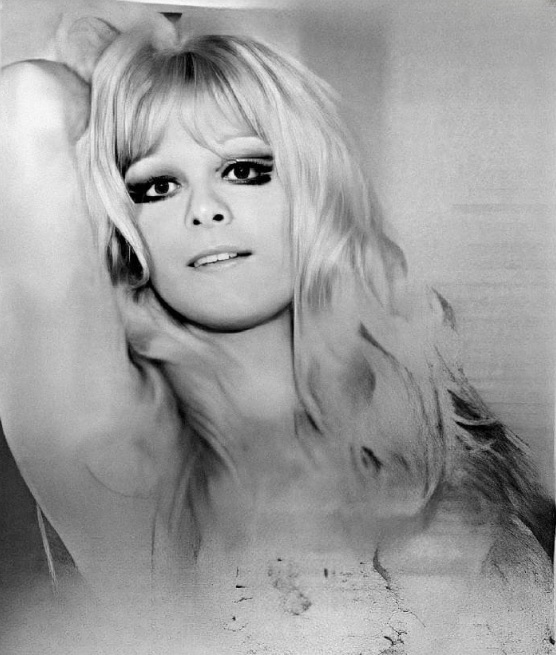
- Jorge Perez Evelyn in Buenos Aires, 1974
- Born: Jorge Perez; Buenos Aires, Argentina
- Occupations: Actor; dancer; singer; model; vedette
- Mother: Hilda Dehil
- Relatives: Anita Bobasso (grandmother)

Jorge Perez Evelyn is the stage name of Jorge Perez, an Argentine actor who rose to prominence in the 1980s as the first man-vedette in the popular revista porteña circuit of Buenos Aires, concentrated along the Avenida Corrientes. Until then, being a vedette was a role only reserved for those born women.

== Early life ==
Jorge Pérez is a third-generation artist. His mother, Hilda Dehil, was a vedette of vaudeville shows like the Moulin Rouge in Paris, and his grandma, Anita Bobasso, was an actress and singer. Jorge inherited both of his artistic talents. Being only 18 years old, he was in a musical show named "Verdissimo" (Very Green) at Cafe Teatro Popea on famous Corrientes Street, the center of all entertainment in Buenos Aires. As seen in "Alternativa Teatral," Jorge Perez, an Argentine actor who played Evelyn, is the drag queen who marked an era in that genre in Argentina. Evelyn was launched by journalist Leo Vanes on Corrientes Street in a musical named "Verdisimo" in "Teatro Popea.".

This musical was followed by a revue show in Las Vegas style called "Los Vecinos de Corrientes", (The Neighbors of Corrientes), directed by Edgardo Cane and produced by Argentine journalist Leo Vanés. The producer Antonio Prat, director of the well-known Teatro Maipo, invited Evelyn to star in a revue named "Una Noche de Locura.( A Crazy Evening) with the comedian Alberto Locati and the Argentine folkloric ballet named "Argentina Trio" in Teatro El Gallo Azul de Rosario in November 1974.

At the end of 1974, Gerardo Sofovich, the Argentine producer, called Evelyn to star in a movie and, at the same time, be the attraction for his musical production called "Corrientes de Lujo" in Sans Souci Music Hall. The producer knew that having Evelyn in the movie theaters and, at the same time, in the musical show would attract a lot of attention. [6] This theater was considered the closest Argentine version to Le Lido in Paris. It was located in the entertainment venue in Buenos Aires, Avenida Corrientes. In this musical, Evelyn shared the stage with Betty Lascaris, who was a dancer at the Moulin Rouge in Paris. Other Argentine artists acting in this musical were Estela Raval, Marty Cosens, and Chico Novarro. As a result of this musical, Evelyn quickly became part of the news in the magazines, as shown on pages 76 and 77 of "Gente y la Actualidad," published by Editorial Atlántida, and Magazine siete dias. This theater was considered the closest Argentine version to Le Lido in Paris. It was located in the entertainment venue in Buenos Aires, Avenida Corrientes. In this musical, Evelyn shared the stage with Betty Lascaris, who was a dancer at the Moulin Rouge in Paris. Other Argentine artists acting in this musical were Estela Raval, Marty Cosens, and Chico Novarro. As a result of this musical, Evelyn quickly became part of the news in the magazines, as shown on pages 76 and 77 of "Gente y la Actualidad", published by Editorial Atlántida, and Magazine siete dias. both magazines specializing in the show business including the two centers page of "Revista Gente" showing the cast of the musical "Corrientes de Lujo" with Jorge Perez EVELYN in the center, reading "A show to applaud and enjoy".. In 1975, while performing in the revue Corrientes de Lujo at the Teatro Sans Souci in Buenos Aires, she received frequent visits from a renowned Argentine boxing champion in her dressing room, an event that generated rumors within the theatrical environment of the time.

== Military dictatorship ==
The militaries, also known as the dirty war took over the Argentine government. Evelyn was supposed to starring a movie with a well-known Argentine comedian Alberto Olmedo. The film was named " My girlfriend the transvestite". The military censor did not allow to use the word transvestite in the movie name, and it ended up being named "My girlfriend him..." As soon as military censorship officials realized that an actual drag queen was the star of the movie, they informed producers that they "will not allow a man dressed as a woman in the movie", (but then allowed the actress that replaced Evelyn to dress as a man). Miguel Paulino Tato, is considered the highest censor in the history of Argentine cinema from August 1974 to March 24, 1976, during the presidency of María Estela Martínez de Perón; and from there until the end of 1980, during the civic-military dictatorship.

The prestigious publication Page 12 from Buenos Aires, have featured Evelyn in its cover in January 2023, with 2 pages inside dedicated to the narrative of the Evelyn frustrated career. After having received a death threat note left on the dresser in his dressing room, Jorge decided to leave his country to protect his life, helped by longtime friend star Nelida Roca.

== Career ==
Jorge Perez Evelyn left Argentina with a stop in Rio de Janeiro, Brazil for a successful press conference. This press conference prepared by producer Hugo De Freitas, had the purpose of making Evelyn known in the Brazilian theater industry to star in a musical show after her contract in Venezuela ended, but this never happened due to the success obtained in Caracas that It lasted longer than expected. The Brazil stop was followed by the musical in Caracas, Venezuela a country that wide opened their arms to receive Evelyn. Soon he become the center o the press showing in the cover of all Venezuelan magazines. He did there two musicals "Noche de Gala" and "Gran Variety a lo Riviera", produced by Joaquin Riviera, both productions lasted for a full year.

== Europe ==
Libertad Leblanc an Argentine movie star who is Jorge's close friend, suggested to Evelyn do not miss Europe. Libertad screamed to the press in Europe: "soon there will be arriving Evelyn, an stage artist produced in America, be ready to enjoy him"... The public, producers and press critics that assisted to the Evelyn Show presentation in Cerebros Music Hall in Madrid, Spain, (a presentation just for the media), as the Diario ABC de Madrid publishes in its column "Blanco y Negro" a photo of Evelyn with her dancers carrying her through the air that reads:"Evelyn is a great star thanks to a great Argentine actor Jorge Perez and comments under the photo: Evelyn is, simply, a great star who sings, dances, and does what she wants on stage. The International Evelyn Show is a revue in vaudeville style without a book, in which nothing has been neglected".. The Spain's press was impressed by Jorge's stage talent, that a week later he was in the cover of the Magazine Chiss. They called Evelyn to be the successor of the English Actor Danny La Rue, and a contract followed the presentation for performing in European cities that lasted for 3 years, named International Evelyn Show. EVELYN performed in several Music Halls, and as the Seville newspaper reads:"Oasis Seville" announces the sensation of America in Europe. Evelyn, the most beautiful woman in the world, is a man, and his name is Jorge Perez. Continuing with the newspaper Libertad of Valladolid which also published an article named "I am a man", Jorge Perez Evelyn wants to make the issue very clear. He flees from misunderstandings because he thinks that being a transvestite is a genre as worthy as any other, and continue all over Europe including private millionaire's parties at the Costa del Sol, discothèques and Theatres. After a successful tour in Italy, Jorge Perez Evelyn received the Riccione award as a foreign actor, with Walter Chiari as a national actor.

== Back to America ==
America claimed Evelyn back in the 1999s, and after a long tour that lasted several years in Miami, Las Vegas and The Roxy (New York City) shows, Jorge decided to put a stop to his career and settle in New York City and Long Island, to help develop his lifetime partner Rodolfo Valentin his career. A chain of hair salons was opened in the New York City and Long Island NY area. As a result, Jorge has turned his former show-business life into an entrepreneur. Jorge Perez currently resides in New York.

Recently in 2023, Jorge Perez Evelyn has been rediscovered as seen in the Pagina 12 article "Evelyn's silenced story" on which Evelyn is also the cover, that reads "after leaving the country due to censorship (which prevented him from starring alongside Olmedo in the film My Girlfriend El..., released in 1975, with Susana Giménez as his replacement), the actor Jorge Pérez Evelyn continued working around the world and at the end In the 90s he settled in New York. A third-generation artist –his mother and grandmother were vedettes-, Pérez talks about exile, transphobia and hypocrisy in the Argentine showbiz, and the differences between cross-dressing and the drag universe. And it also tells the story of Evelyn, its most famous character, and also the most persecuted, who is now rescued by proposals that range from podcasts to exhibitions in national museums to a series soon to be seen on one of the important platforms".

== Musical revues ==
Title	Year	Location	Role	Cast
El Tercer Sexo se Divierte	1973	Theatron, Santa Fe Avenue	First Vedette	Vanessa Show, Susy Parker, Graciela Scott, Ira Velazquez, Ana Lupe, Jean Dupre (Carlos Mendez).
Verdisimo	1974	Cafe Teatro Popea, Corrientes Avenue	First Vedette	Jovita Luna, Pablo Palitos, Rafael Garcia, Script: Enrique Pinti, Leo Vanes and others.
Los Vecinos de Corrientes	1974	Cafe Teatro Popea, Corrientes Avenue	First Vedette	Pablo Palitos, Jovita Luna, Gladys Mancini, Dolores de Cicco, Silvia Cramer and Edgardo Cane.
Una Noche de Locura	1974	Teatro de la Peatonal	First Vedette	Alberto Locati, Argentina Trio, directed by Antonio Prat of Teatro Maipo.
Corrientes de Lujo	1975	Sans Souci, Corrientes Avenue	Vedette	Estela Raval, Chico Novarro, Marty Cosens, Betty Lascaris, vedette of the Moulin Rouge of Paris, directed by Gerardo Sofovich.
Gran Variete a lo Riviera	1976	El Golpe Music Hall, Caracas, Venezuela	First Vedette	Zaima Beleño, directed by Joaquín Riviera.
Noche de Gala	1977	Palacio Imperial, Caracas, Venezuela	First Vedette	Teatro Maipo Ballet, Choreographer Eric Zepeda.
International Evelyn Show	1978	York Music Hall Madrid, Spain.	First Vedette	Éber Lobato dancers.
International Evelyn Show	1979	Italy Tour	First Vedette	Blue Bell Girls.

== Movies ==
- 1975: My Girlfriend him - With Alberto Olmedo, movie that was censured by the military dictatorship government and Evelyn was replaced by another person.
