= El Primer beso =

- Directed by: Enrique Carreras
- Written by: Julio Porter
- Starring: Adrianita; Alberto Barrie
- Cinematography: Antonio Merayo
- Music by: Eber Lobato
- Release date: 1957
- Running time: 83 minutes
- Country: Argentina
- Language: Spanish

El Primer beso is a 1957 Argentine film directed by Enrique Carreras, written by Julio Porter, and starring Adrianita, Carlos Borsani and Francisco Álvarez.

== Plot ==
El Primer Beso is a romance between the son of a taxi driver and a salesgirl at a newsstand.

== Cast ==
- Adrianita
- Alberto Barrie
- Carlos Borsani
- Mercedes Carreras
- Olga Gatti
- Roberto Guthie
- Perla Laske
- Eber Lobato
- María Luisa Santés
- Francisco Álvarez

== Reception ==
Clarín wrote that it was "[t]he best work of its director. Elemental resources, well used".

El Mundo called it a "[r]emarkable advancement".

A review in La Prensa was more critical: "It can only be conceived as made by mediocre beginners" and noted that the story background was monotonous.
