= Adrianita =

Argentine actress (born 1941)

- Born: Adriana Caputi Bianco
- Occupation: Actress
- Notable work: Received the Silver Condor lifetime achievement award

Adriana Caputi Bianco (born 1941), known professionally as Adrianita, is an Argentine actress. She starred in films such as Tulio Demicheli's La melodía perdida (1952) opposite César Fiaschi and Santiago Gómez Cou, Román Viñoly Barreto's La niña del gato (1953) opposite Adolfo Stray, and Enrique Carreras's Mi marido hoy duerme en casa (1955) and El primer beso (1957). For her performance in La niña del gato the Argentine Film Critics Association awarded her the Silver Condor Award for Best Supporting Actress and she became a star. In 2004 the Argentine Film Critics Association awarded her with the Silver Condor lifetime achievement award. She lives in Miami.

== Filmography ==
- La melodía perdida (1952)
- La niña del gato (1953) …Nonó
- Ritmo, amor y picardía (1955)
- Mi marido hoy duerme en casa (1955)
- Mientras haya un circo (1958)
- El primer beso (1958)
- El ojo que espía (1966) …Doblaje de Janet Margolin
