= The Godparents =

Los Padrinos
- Directed by: Enrique Carreras
- Written by: Enrique Carreras; Abel Santacruz
- Edited by: Jorge Gárate
- Release date: 1973
- Running time: 90 minutes
- Country: Argentina
- Language: Spanish

Los Padrinos (The Godparents) is a 1973 Argentine film.

== Cast ==
- Gabriel Aragón
- Mercedes Carreras
- Emilio Aragón
