= Crazy Women (film) =

Las Locas
- Directed by: Enrique Carreras
- Written by: José P. Dominiani
- Edited by: Jorge Gárate
- Release date: 21 April 1977
- Running time: 91 minutes
- Country: Argentina
- Language: Spanish

Crazy Women (Spanish: Las locas) is a 1977 Argentine drama film written by José P. Dominiani and directed by Enrique Carreras. It was entered into the 10th Moscow International Film Festival where Mercedes Carreras won the award for Best Actress.

== Cast ==
- Marta Albertini
- Virginia Amestoy
- Trissi Bauer
- Leonor Benedetto
- Olinda Bozán
- Alicia Bruzzo
- Juan Jos Camero
- Mercedes Carreras
- Marta Cipriano
- Luis Corradi
- Mara Danelli
- Aurora del Mar
- Hctor Fuentes
- Carlos Luzzieti
- Leonor Manso
- Nora Massi
- Carlos Muoz
- Ins Murray
