= The Stork Said Yes =

La cigüeña dijo ¡Sí!
- Film poster
- Directed by: Enrique Carreras
- Written by: Alejandro Casona based on a Carlos Llopis play.
- Produced by: Nicolás Carreras, Luis Carreras y Enrique Carreras
- Starring: Lola Membrives; Tomás Blanco; Esteban Serrador; Susana Campos
- Cinematography: Alfredo Traverso
- Edited by: José Gallego
- Music by: Vlady
- Distributed by: Productora General Belgrano
- Release date: April 22, 1955
- Running time: 72 minutes
- Country: Argentina
- Language: Spanish

The Stork Said Yes (La cigüeña dijo ¡Sí!) is a 1955 Argentine comedy film directed by Enrique Carreras, from a script by Alejandro Casona based on a Carlos Llopis play. It stars Lola Membrives, Tomás Blanco, Esteban Serrador and Susana Campos and premiered on April 22, 1955. It was the last of Lola Membrives' few incursions into cinema. In 1971, Carreras remade the film based on the same play as La familia hippie, starring Palito Ortega.

== Plot ==
A mature married couple happily receives the news of pregnancy while a young couple has the disappointment of a frustrated attempt.

== Cast ==
- Lola Membrives as Doña Antonina
- Tomás Blanco as Don Eduardo
- Esteban Serrador as Claudio
- Susana Campos as Pilar
- Hugo Pimentel as Solís
- Paquita Más as Felisa
- Delfy Miranda
- Antonio Martiánez as Dr. Fernández Pérez
- Elder Barber

== Reception ==
The critic Manuel Rey, known as "King", said that the film was: "A successful comedy". La Nación wrote that its "festive tone is achieved with communicative grace...its light plot has counted with good effect situations."
