= Aroldi =

Aroldi is an Italian surname. Notable people with the surname include:

- Aldo Mario Aroldi (1899–1963), Italian painter
- Norberto Aroldi (1931–1978), Argentine actor
