= Los Payasos de la Tele =

Trio of clowns on Spanish television

Los Payasos de la Tele (English: The TV Clowns) is the name by which a trio of popular Spanish clowns are known, initially formed by Gaby (Gabriel Aragón), Fofó (Alfonso Aragón Bermúdez) and Miliki (Emilio Aragón), and succeeded by Fofito (Alfonso Aragón Jr.), Milikito (Emilio Aragón Jr.) and Rody (Rody Aragón). They were well-known on Spanish language television in Latin America throughout much of the twentieth century before returning to Spain and attaining further success.

== History ==
Heirs of a long family tradition of circus performance, which stretches back to the nineteenth century, they were sons of Emilio Aragón the elder and nephews of José María and Teodoro Aragón - Emig, Pompoff y Teddy. Other members of the family with circus connections included their cousins Nabucodonosorcito and Zampabollos.

Gaby, Fofó and Miliki began their activities in Spain in 1939 at the Circo Price. In 1946, the three brothers emigrated across the Atlantic, where they remained for more than a quarter of a century. They first set up shop in Cuba, where they made their first incursions into the world of television in 1949. In the following years, the diffusion of their shows in other countries in Latin America made them familiar faces in Mexico, Venezuela, Puerto Rico, and the United States. Between 1965 and 1971 they moved to Puerto Rico, where they transmitted a daily program called El Show de las 5, one of the most popular and remembered shows in the history of TV in that country.

In 1970 they arrived in Argentina, and achieved great success through their program El zapato roto (The broken Shoe), which they then renamed El show de Gaby, Fofó y Miliki. Soon a new member of the family, Fofito (the son of Fofó), made appearances.

Two years later, in 1972, they returned to Spain, contracting with Televisión Española to front a new program called El Gran Circo de TVE ("The Great Circus of TVE"). This programme replaced the also well-known Los Chiripitifláuticos. It was a great success, remaining on air until 1981, and became an enormous cultural phenomenon in Spain in the 1970s. The group was awarded a TP de Oro, a prestigious Spanish television award, for "most popular personality" in 1974.

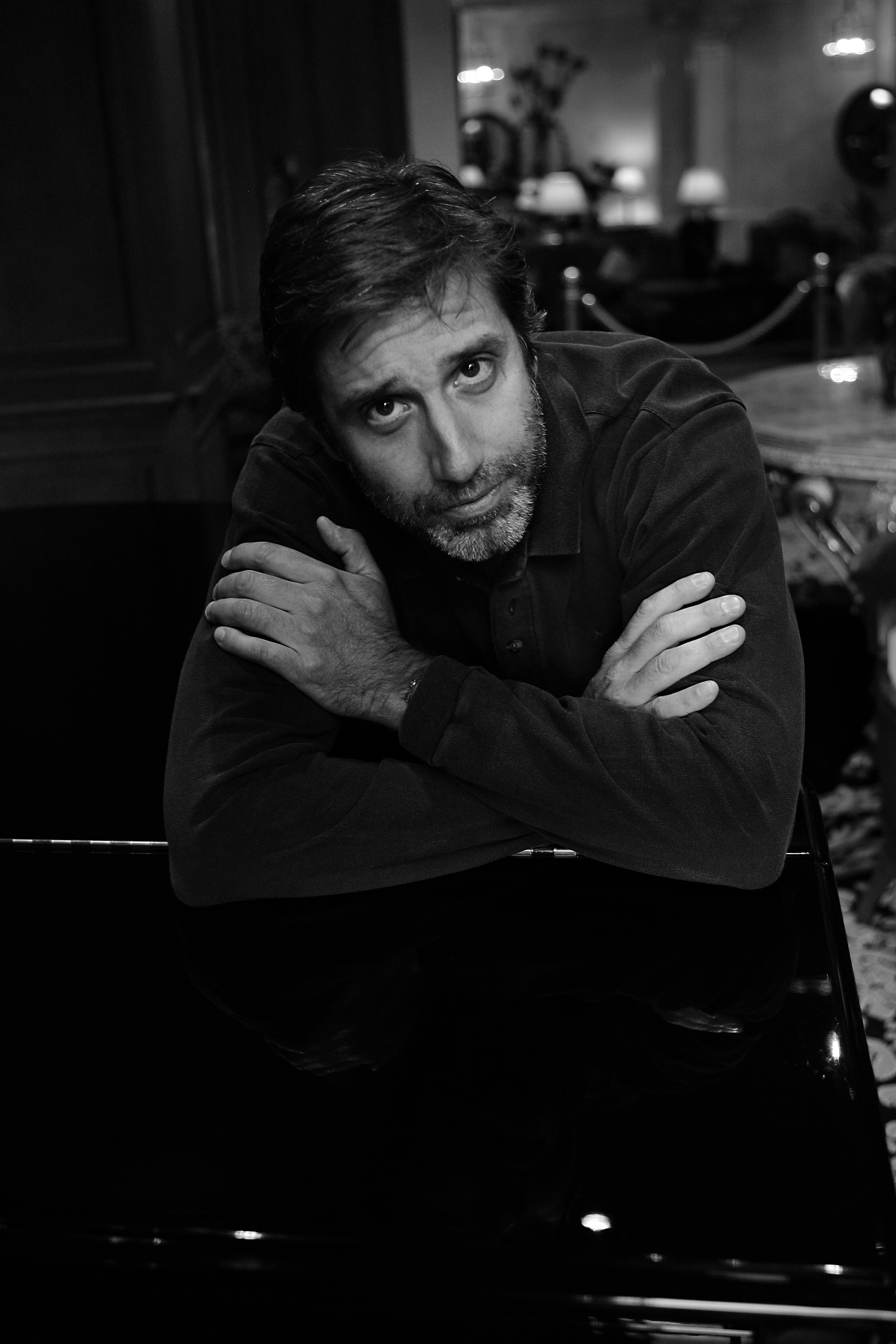
Emilio Aragón, at the beginning of his career known as Milikito

After the death of Fofó in 1976, the son of Miliki, Emilio Aragón Jr., joined the group under the name Milikito. He is a mute clown, in the tradition of Harpo Marx, and communicates with a cow bell. Much later, after the show ended in 1981, Rody, the youngest son of Fofó, joined the group in the persona of a black Cuban.

Finally, the program (which in its final form was called El loco mundo de los payasos, or "The Crazy World of the Clowns"), was retired from Spanish television in 1983. After several circus tours during the following two years, under the title El fabuloso mundo del circo (The Fabulous World of the Circus), the group (which by this time Miliki had already left) dissolved definitively.

== Songs ==
- Hola, Don Pepito (music and lyrics written by the famous Puerto Rican actor/comedian Ramón Rivero (Diplo)
- Di por qué (Dime, abuelita)
- Mami (yo quiero comer lechón)
- La gallina turuleca (Spanish version of the hit song "A galinha magricela" from the Brazilian songwriter Edgard Poças)
- Susanita
- ¿Cómo están ustedes?
- Mi barba tiene tres pelos
- Un barquito de cáscara de nuez
- El auto feo (original from Pipo Pescador)
- El sombrero de Fofó
- Cómo me pica la nariz
- Qué nos da el cerdito
- Chinita tú
- Una sonrisa y una flor
- En la autocaravana
- Feliz en tu día
- Dale Ramón
- Había una vez un circo

== Films ==
- Los Padrinos
- Había una vez un circo

== Comics ==
In 1971 a celebrity comic strip, Gaby, Fofó, Miliki y Milikito (1971), was made, based on Los Payasos de la Tele. It was drawn by Félix Saborido.

== Tributes ==
In 2024, a year after the 50th anniversary of their first broadcast on TVE, they were honoured with the theatrical and musical show Había una vez, mi familia. Created and directed by Esteve Ferrer, and produced by Emilio Aragón, it featured Mónica Aragón, Gonzalo Aragón, Rodrígo Aragón and Alonso Aragón.

== See also ==
- Payasos Sin Fronteras
