= Emilio Aragón =

Emilio Aragón may refer to:

- Emilio Aragón Bermúdez (1929–2012), also known as Miliki, Spanish clown, accordionist and singer
- Emilio Aragón (director) (born 1959), also known as Milikito, son of Miliki, Spanish actor, presenter, musician and producer
