= Spring Fever (1965 film) =

Fiebre de primavera
- Directed by: Enrique Carreras
- Written by: Alexis de Arancibia; Alexis de Arancibia
- Based on: Fiebre de primavera 1964 play by Alfonso Paso
- Starring: Violeta Rivas; Palito Ortega
- Cinematography: Antonio Merayo
- Edited by: Jorge Gárate
- Music by: Lucio Milena
- Distributed by: Argentina Sono Film S.A.C.I.
- Release date: 1965
- Running time: 100 minutes
- Country: Argentina
- Language: Spanish

Spring Fever (Fiebre de primavera) is a 1965 Argentine film.

== Cast ==
- Palito Ortega
- Violeta Rivas
- Estela Molly
- Nora Cárpena
- Juan Carlos Altavista
- Pedro Quartucci
- Tono Andreu
- Javier Portales
- Santiago Gómez Cou
- Tristán
