= The Hippie Family =

La familia hippie
- Film poster
- Directed by: Enrique Carreras
- Written by: Carlos Llopis, Abel Santacruz
- Cinematography: Antonio Merayo
- Edited by: Jorge Gárate
- Music by: Tito Ribero
- Release date: 1971
- Country: Argentina
- Language: Spanish

The Hippie Family (La familia hippie) is a 1971 Argentine musical comedy film by Enrique Carreras. It stars Ángel Magaña and Palito Ortega. Not being a movie about 'hippies' as such, the title refers to the portrayal of a family in which mother and daughter are pregnant simultaneously. The movie is a remake of the 1955 production La Cigüeña dijo sí, both films are based on a play by Carlos Llopis.

== Cast ==
- Ángel Magaña
- Palito Ortega
- Liliana Abayieva
- Tono Andreu
- Joe Borsani
- Olinda Bozán
- Elina Colomer
- Carlos Fioriti
- Estela Molly
- Ernesto Raquén
- Paquita Vehil
