= The Falcón Family =

- Directed by: Román Viñoly Barreto
- Written by: Hugo Moser
- Starring: Pedro Quartucci; Elina Colomer; Roberto Escalada
- Release date: 1963
- Running time: 90 minutes
- Country: Argentina
- Language: Spanish

The Falcón Family (Spanish: La familia Falcón) is a 1963 Argentine film.

== Cast ==
- Pedro Quartucci
- Elina Colomer
- Roberto Escalada
- Emilio Comte
- Alberto Fernández de Rosa
- Silvia Merlino
- José Luis Mazza
- Ovidio Fuentes
- Ubaldo Martínez
- Santiago Gómez Cou
