= Those Crazy Years =

Aquellos años locos
- Directed by: Enrique Carreras
- Written by: Norberto Aroldi; Enrique Carreras; Julio Porter
- Starring: Palito Ortega; Mercedes Carreras
- Cinematography: Antonio Merayo
- Edited by: Jorge Gárate
- Music by: Tito Ribero
- Distributed by: Argentina Sono Film
- Release date: 30 July 1971
- Running time: 85 minutes
- Country: Argentina
- Language: Spanish

Aquellos años locos (also known as Those Crazy Years in USA) is a 1971 Argentine musical comedy film directed and written by Enrique Carreras with Norberto Aroldi. The film premiered on 30 July 1971 in Buenos Aires and stars Palito Ortega and Mercedes Carreras. The movie was filmed in Mar del Plata, Buenos Aires.

== Cast ==
- Palito Ortega
- Mercedes Carreras
- Elvia Andreoli
- Tono Andreu
- Marta Cipriano
- Emilio Comte
- Daniel de Alvarado
- Aurora Del Mar
- Dorys del Valle
- Ivan Grey
- Norma López Monet
- Lalo Malcolm
- Domingo Márquez
- María de los Ángeles Medrano
- Ernesto Raquén
- Raúl Rossi
- Óscar Rovito
- Mario Sapag
- Paquita Vehil
