= Laura Hidalgo =

Argentine actress

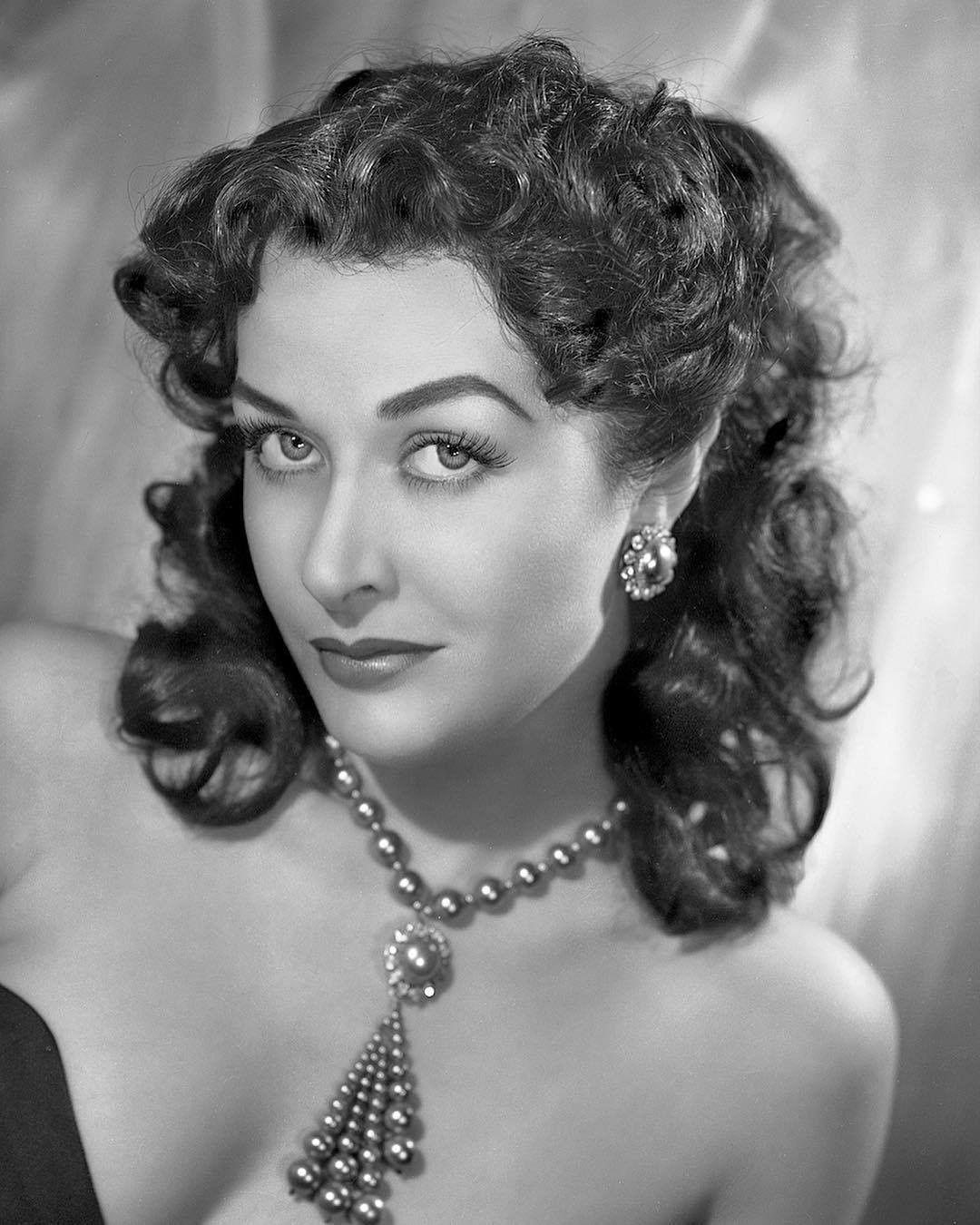
- Portrait by Annemarie Heinrich
- Born: Pesea Faerman Postolow; 1 May 1927; Chișinău, Kingdom of Romania
- Died: 18 November 2005 (aged 78); La Jolla, San Diego, California, United States
- Occupation: Actress
- Years active: 1948–1958
- Spouse: Manuel Rosen
- Children: 3

Laura Hidalgo (1 May 1927 – 18 November 2005) was an Argentine actress of the classical era of Argentine cinema.

== Biography ==
Born in Chișinău, Bessarabia as Pesya Faerman (Russian: Песя Фаерман) , her family moved in 1931 to Buenos Aires, where she grew up. Hidalgo appeared in sixteen films in Mexico, Spain and Argentina. She often drew comparisons with the Austrian actress Hedy Lamarr, whom she resembled. In 1954, she was nominated for an Ariel Award for Best Actress for her performance in Las tres perfectas casadas (1953). She retired from acting in 1958, following her marriage to an architect, and settled in Mexico. Later in life, she moved to the United States.

== Filmography ==
Hidalgo with Hugo del Carril in Más allá del olvido (1956)

Year	Title	Role	Notes
1948	Su última pelea		
1950	Cinco grandes y una chica	Norma	
1950	El morocho del Abasto: La vida de Carlos Gardel		
1950	Juan Mondiola		
1951	Derecho viejo		
1952	The Tunnel	María Iribarne	
1952	The Beast Must Die	Linda Lawson	
1953	The Three Perfect Wives	Ada	
1953	The Orchid		
1953	Black Ermine		
1954	María Magdalena		
1954	Caídos en el infierno	Wanda	
1955	El tren expreso	Andrea	
1956	Beyond Oblivion	Blanca / Mónica	
1957	Las campanas de Teresa		
1958	La mafia del crimen		(final film role)

== Bibliography ==
- Plazaola, Luis Trelles. South American Cinema. La Editorial, UPR, 1989.
