= My Husband Sleeps At Home Today =

Mi marido hoy duerme en casa
- Film poster
- Directed by: Enrique Carreras
- Written by: Abel Santa Cruz
- Starring: Leonor Rinaldi, Francisco Álvarez, May Avril and Gogó Andreu
- Cinematography: Roque Funes
- Edited by: Oscar Gallego
- Music by: Víctor Schlichter
- Production company: Productora General Belgrano
- Distributed by: Productora General Belgrano
- Release date: October 13, 1955
- Running time: 80 minutes
- Country: Argentina
- Language: Spanish

My Husband Sleeps At Home Today (Mi marido hoy duerme en casa) is a 1955 Argentine film directed by Enrique Carreras from a script by Abel Santa Cruz. It stars Leonor Rinaldi, Francisco Álvarez, May Avril and Gogó Andreu and was released on October 13, 1955. May Avril was at that time a star of the Folies Bergère's revue cast.

== Plot ==
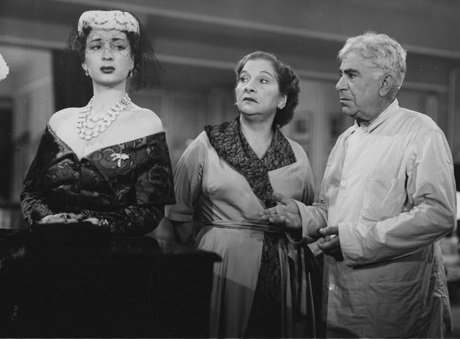
Screenshot

Sons and sons-in-law hatch a plan to reunite a recently separated marriage.

== Cast ==
- Leonor Rinaldi
- Francisco Álvarez
- May Avril
- Gogó Andreu
- Tono Andreu
- Olga Gatti
- Adrianita
- Carmen Campoy
- Héctor Armendáriz
- Gerardo Chiarella
- Emilio Vieyra
- Diana Stevani
- Carlos Gustavo Jackson
- Alfredo Aristu
- Rosita Vanders
- Pablo Indovino

== Reception ==
Set magazine wrote (translated from Spanish): "Simple adaptation that does not hide in its realization its stage provenance. A comic and nonsensical film for an undemanding audience." Noticias Gráficas said that "There is always someone who laughs at things that are so hackneyed. "
