= Juan Mondiola =

1950 film by Manuel Romero

- Directed by: Manuel Romero
- Written by: Alejandro Verbitzky; Emilio Villalba Welsh
- Starring: Juan José Miguez; Elina Colomer; Laura Hidalgo
- Cinematography: Antonio Prieto
- Edited by: Gerardo Rinaldi
- Music by: George Andreani
- Production company: Emelco
- Release date: 5 September 1950
- Running time: 95 minutes
- Country: Argentina
- Language: Spanish

Juan Mondiola is a 1950 Argentine comedy film of the classical era of Argentine cinema, directed by Manuel Romero and starring Juan José Miguez, Elina Colomer and Laura Hidalgo.

The film's sets were designed by Álvaro Durañona y Vedia.

== Cast ==
- Elina Colomer
- Mauricio Espósito
- Pilar Gómez
- Laura Hidalgo
- Juan José Miguez
- Rodolfo Onetto
- Pedro Pompillo
- Juan José Porta
- Fernando Siro

== See also ==
- List of works by Manuel Romero

== Bibliography ==
- César Maranghello. Breve historia del cine argentino. Celesa, 2005.
