= Violeta Rivas =

Argentinian singer

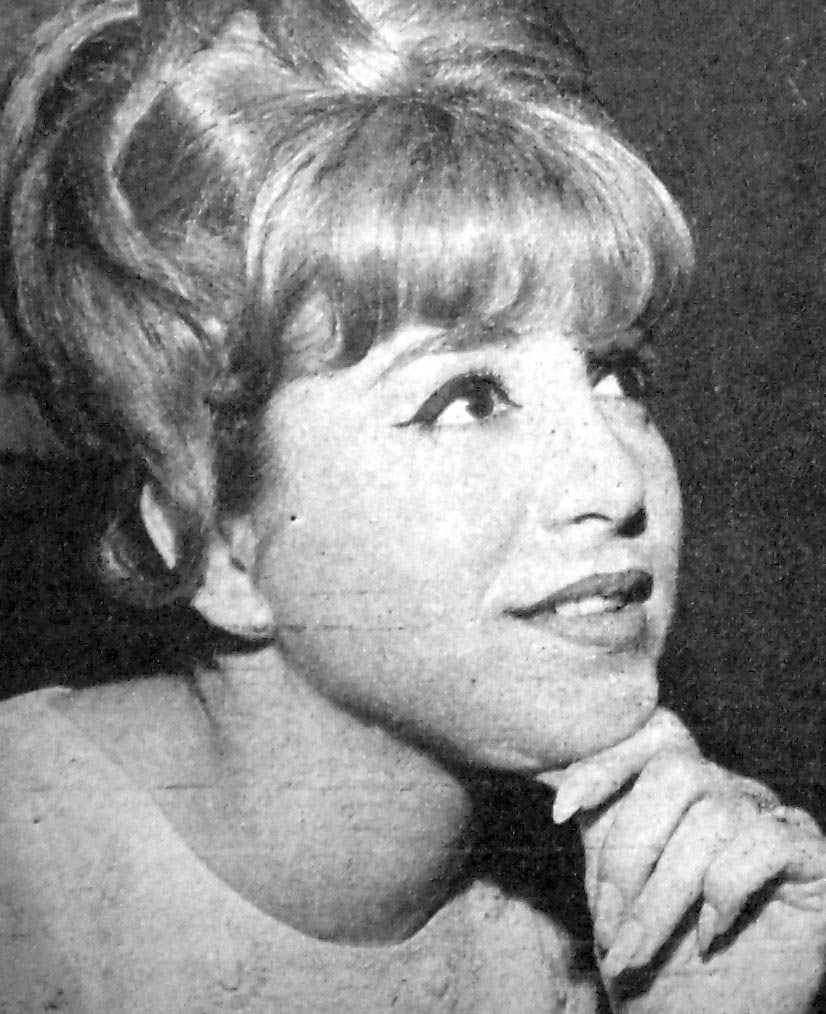
Violeta Rivas

Ana María Francisca Adinolfi (stage name, Violeta Rivas; 4 October 1937 – 23 June 2018) was an Argentine singer and actress, known for participating in the music program El Club del Clan, along with Palito Ortega, Raúl Lavié, Johnny Tedesco and Chico Novarro.

== Biography ==
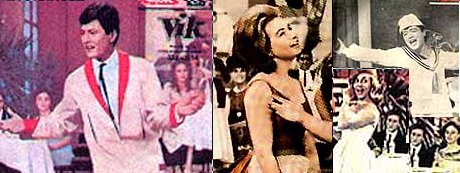
Violeta Rivas in El Club del Clan.

Rivas was born in Chivilcoy, Buenos Aires Province, in 1937. At the age of five, she participated in a contest in Chivilcoy singing the songs of Clavito Chino and Los Gitanos. A year later, she was chosen by her school to sing in the choir of the Postal Savings Bank. She subsequently studied lyrical singing. Rivas married Néstor Fabián and they had a daughter.

In 1960, she became contracted for four months to perform in Buenos Aires. The director, Ricardo Mejía, gave her the stage name Violeta Rivas. That same year, she recorded a duet with Bobby Capó, Llorando me dormí, which became one of the radio hits of 1960. Shortly after, she recorded her first major success as a solo artist, Burbuja azul. In 1962, she debuted on Canal 7, participating in the program's El hit de sus favoritos as well as in El Club del Clan.

In Lima, Peru, she received the award for Best Foreign Singer. In December 1964, she began filming Fiebre de Junio. She also performed "¡Que Suerte!" in Uruguay, which became her greatest hit, along with Chico Novarro and Palito Ortega. By 1965, after developing a successful solo career, Rivas toured Latin America singing melodic songs. After the 1960s, she continued to perform in other films and to sing other songs such as "Colorado", "El Baile del Ladrillo", "El Cardenal", among others.

== Discography ==
- 1963: Violeta Rivas - RCA VICTOR ARGENTINA
- 1964: Que Suerte - RCA VICTOR ARGENTINA
- 1964: Serie Consagración - RCA ARGENTINA
- 1964: Serie Consagración - RCA URUGUAY
- 1965: Violeta Rivas con amor - RCA VICTOR ARGENTINA
- 1965: Fiebre de primavera - RCA ARGENTINA
- 1965: Fiebre de primavera - RCA VENEZUELA
- 1965: Nacidos para cantar - Junto a Juan Ramón - RCA VICTOR
- 1965: Violeta Rivas - RCA VICTOR ARGENTINA
- 1965: Violeta Rivas - RCA PERU
- 1966: Lo mejor de Violeta Rivas - RCA ECUADOR
- 1966: Violeta Rivas interpreta canciones del Festival de San Remo 1966 - RCA VICTOR ARGENTINA
- 1967: Lo mejor de Violeta Rivas - RCA VICTOR ARGENTINA
- 1967: Violeta Rivas - RCA VICTOR ARGENTINA
- 1968: El picaflor y la rosa - RCA VICTOR ARGENTINA
- 1969: Lo mejor de Violeta Rivas - RCA VICTOR ARGENTINA
- 1969: Violeta Rivas - RCA PERU
- 1969: Voy cantando con Violeta Rivas - RCA VICTOR PUERTO RICO
- 1970: Hay Música - RCA VICTOR ARGENTINA
- 1973: El ángel del amor - MICROFON-IFESA ECUADOR
- 1976: Violeta Rivas - CABAL ARGENTINA
- 1976: Soy tu eterna enamorada - ALFA-MICROFON ECUADOR
- 1978: Una Violeta en Brodway - CARISMA RECORD ESTADOS UNIDOS
- 1978: Una Violeta en Brodway - LLUVIA DE ESTRELLAS ECUADOR
- 1979: Es mi Hombre - ALHAMBRA ESTADOS UNIDOS
- 1980: Súper Hits - DISCOLOR ESTADOS UNIDOS
- 1981: Grandes Éxitos de Violeta Rivas - RCA ARGENTINA
- 1992: Cronología - BMG ARGENTINA
- 1994: Violeta Rivas en vivo - REALIZADO POR FANS
- 1997: Serie 20 Éxitos - BMG ARGENTINA
- 1997: Inéditos, rarezas y otras perlas - BMG ARGENTINA
- 1998: Violeta Rivas en Vivo 2 - REALIZADO POR FANS
- 1998: Serie El Club del Clan - BMG ARGENTINA
- 2000: Salsa Ultra Violeta - ARGENTINA
- 2004: 20 Secretos de amor - BMG ARGENTINA

== Filmography ==
- 1964: Buenas noches, Buenos Aires
- 1964: El Club del Clan
- 1965: Fiebre de primavera
- 1965: Nacidos para cantar
- 1967: Mi secretaria está loca... loca... loca ...Malena Elías
- 1969: ¡Viva la vida!

== Bibliography ==
- Manzano, Valeria (2014). The Age of Youth in Argentina: Culture, Politics, and Sexuality from Perón to Videla. UNC Press Books. ISBN 978-1-4696-1161-7.
