= Nacidos para cantar =

- Directed by: Emilio Gómez Muriel
- Written by: Alfredo Ruanova
- Produced by: Argentina Sono Film
- Starring: Violeta Rivas; Enrique Guzmán
- Cinematography: Américo Hoss
- Release date: 1965
- Country: Argentina
- Language: Spanish

Nacidos para cantar is a 1965 Argentine film.

== Plot ==
The famous artist discovers his identical twin while touring Argentina. There are many complications, but in the end, the twin love triumphs.

== Cast ==
- Enrique Guzmán
- Violeta Rivas
- Juan Ramon
- Julissa
- Zulma Faiad
- Jorge Luz
- Los T.N.T
- Chucho Salinas
- Mario Fortuna
- Pablo De Madaleingoitia
- Vicente Rubino
- Música Lucio Milena
- Canciones Chico Novarro
