= My Patricia =

Patricia mía
- Film poster for Patricia mía
- Directed by: Enrique Carreras
- Written by: Emilio Villalba Welsh, based on idea by Enrique Carreras
- Produced by: José R. Soracco
- Starring: Carlos Estrada, Susana Canales, Julio Peña, José Isbert
- Cinematography: Julio César Lavera
- Edited by: José Gallego
- Music by: Ben Molar, Dámaso Pérez Prado
- Production companies: Chapalo Films S.A. (Madrid) and J.J. Soracco
- Release date: 1 February 1961
- Running time: 78 minutes
- Countries: Argentina; Spain
- Language: Spanish

My Patricia (Patricia mía, also known as Punto y banca) is a 1961 romantic comedy film directed by Enrique Carreras, with a screenplay by Emilio Villalba Welsh based on an idea by Enrique Carreras. It stars Carlos Estrada and Susana Canales and features the musical group Los Cinco Latinos. It was partially filmed in Mar del Plata and is the posthumous film of Francisco Álvarez who died in April 1960.

== Plot ==
A woman waiting for her gambler husband is courted by a film actor.

== Cast ==
- Carlos Estrada
- Susana Canales
- Julio Peña
- José Isbert
- Ricardo Castro Ríos
- Nelly Cobella
- Enrique San Miguel
- Francisco Álvarez
- Pablo Acciaresi
- Los Cinco Latinos

== Reception ==
La Razón said in its chronicle: "A deficient cha-cha-cha... Estrada, in his role as an established actor, whispers "The film is very bad". It sounds like a confession." Clarín opined: "Absurd dialogue and forced situations." Raúl Manrupe and María Alejandra Portela in their book Un diccionario de films argentinos (1930–1995) write (translated from Spanish): " La dolce vita according to Carreras, in one of his worst films".
