= Elina Colomer =

Argentine actress (1922–1987)

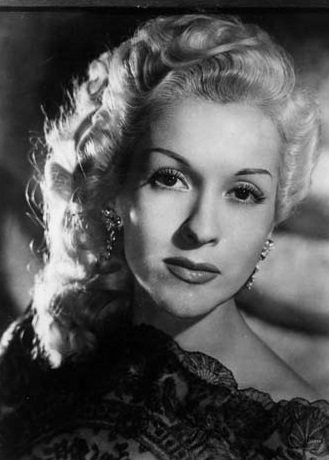
- Colomer in 1950
- Born: July 10, 1922; Buenos Aires, Argentina
- Died: January 2, 1987 (aged 64); Buenos Aires, Argentina
- Occupation: Actress
- Years active: 1942-1983

Elina Colomer (1922–1987) was an Argentine film actress.

== Selected filmography ==
- When Spring Makes a Mistake (1944)
- Our Natacha (1944)
- Lost Kisses (1945)
- Los secretos del buzón (1948)
- An Almost Merry Widow (1950)
- Juan Mondiola (1950)
- My Divine Poverty (1951)
- The Count of Monte Cristo (1953)
- The Falcón Family (1963)
- La familia hippie (1971)

== Bibliography ==
- Goble, Alan. The Complete Index to Literary Sources in Film. Walter de Gruyter, 1999.
