= The Girl Cat =

1953 film by Román Viñoly Barreto

- Directed by: Román Viñoly Barreto
- Release date: 1953
- Running time: 79 minute
- Country: Argentina
- Language: Spanish

The Girl Cat (Spanish: La Niña del gato) is a 1953 Argentine film directed by Román Viñoly Barreto during the classical era of Argentine cinema.

== Cast ==
- Adrianita as Nonó
- Adolfo Stray as Samuel Gorenstein
- Enrique Chaico as Padre de Nonó
- Hugo Lanzillotta as Daniel
- Beba Bidart as Olga
- Ernesto Bianco as Sr. Salas
- Susana Campos as María Elena
- Luis Mora as Sr. Campos
- Alberto Barcel as Sacerdote
- Fausto Padín as Chofer
- Luis de Lucía
- Carlos Cotto as Reducidor
- María Ferez
- Fernando Campos
- Adolfo Meyer
- Sergio Malbrán as Empleado en joyería
- Carlos Morasano as Portero
