= Hilda Dehil =

Argentine actress and singer (1917–1978)

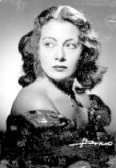
- Hilda Dehil in Buenos Aires
- Born: Hilda Bobasso; February 26, 1917; Buenos Aires, Argentina
- Died: September 8, 1978 (aged 61); Barcelona, Spain
- Occupations: Actor, singer
- Years active: 1933-1970
- Children: Jorge Pérez Evelyn
- Mother: Anita Bobasso

Hilda Dehil (Buenos Aires, February 26, 1917 – September 8, 1978) was an Argentine actress, singer, and dancer who worked throughout Brazil, Europe, and Argentina, her country, where she was very popular, including in radio soap operas and theaters. The musical shows in which she participated used everything from folkloric outfits to informal elegant dances before, later in life, she changed her acting style and formed part of the Vaudeville grace shows that are remarkable for being light in clothes, including the use of feathers and glitter.

== Early life ==
Hilda traveled to Europe with her mother, also an actress and tango singer, to perform for the first time when she was 14 years old. The Madrid newspaper "El Heraldo" dated February 1, 1932, published an article called "Fiesta de poesia, cante, and música", in honor of Azucena Maizani and her Argentine cast of art, of which Hilda was part with her mom in the Alkazar Theater of Madrid.

Diario de Burgos announces in its theater column on page 4 that the Argentine Company debuts at the Principal Coliseo Theater of that city: the Argentine zarzuela and musical revue company, formed exclusively by artists from said republic.(The name of Hilda Bobasso is among those mentioned.).

The musical continued to Valencia and then Palma de Mallorca. As seen in the section "Actualidad Teatral", the article about Teatro en Palma in the newspaper "Ultima Hora" reads that "Azucena Maizani's company's debut announced at the Theater Lirico has had to be postponed due to the success obtained at the Theater Apolo in Valencia, which has led to a three-day extension at that theater.

After two years of traveling around Portugal and Spain, she then continued with her mother in Brazil, acting in the musical La Cancion Argentina, composed by 35 artists, as noted in the newspaper "A Uniao" of Rio de Janeiro, page 6. Also, the newspaper "Diario Carioca" featured Hilda's picture in the theater section of page 7 as "dancer and actress of the cast of the casino.

It was originally supposed to last in Brazil for six months, but given the public acceptance achieved, they remained in Brazil for three consecutive years, presenting their show in cities like Recife, the capital of Pernambuco, in the Theater Moderno. The article reads that when the typical Argentine company arrived in Recife (also known as the Brazilian Venice) and the luxurious liner approached, the journalists were allowed to board it to welcome the company, mentioning that the star of the musical "Anita Bobasso" had introduced to them her daughter Hilda as a prominent element of the show. The musical also was in the Theater Carlos Gomes in Vitoria, the capital of Espiritu Santo and for long periods returned to Rio de Janeiro.

In Brazil she was also part of the’’Home of Artists’’ celebrations and anniversaries’ festivals as noted in the article "O festival commemorativo do dia do artista"(the artist's day commemorative festival). Also presenting their musicals in theaters like ‘’Casino de Copacabana, as commented in the page 8, theaters section of the "Diario Noticias" of Rio de Janeiro. Florida Theater, ‘as announced by the Diario Carioca on page 11, and‘’Theater Santa Isabel, with the musical "Mulher de Porcelana, O Fevro.

== Career in Argentina ==
In Argentina, she continued to use the family name on stage while acting, but only for a short time. According to the books available on search, the results show a book called "History of the Musical Comedy in Argentina, From its Beginnings to 1979, published by the writer Pablo Gorlero in 2004. It shows on page 194 that Hilda Bobasso was the protagonist of the musical comedy entitled "Amor y Patria" (Love for Homeland), Theater "Femina", using the family name alongside the actress Elena Zuccotti. This comedy premiered on May 25, 1933. The next was "Ensayo General" (General Rehearsal), Theater "El Nacional", where before the spectators entered the room, the curtain had already been raised, and on the stage, you could see the drivers in the room making different preparations to begin the performance. "The authors have managed to give originality to this new show. They offer the public an interesting vision of what a dress rehearsal is, which is not, naturally, the daily performance of the show. And the spectator witnesses the stage, the dressing rooms, and the coming and going of the artists at the imperious orders of the transpunt, while the director of the company loudly organizes the show in the midst of the thousand inconveniences that always arise. The troubles of the bataclanas, which do not transcend, the small dramas that originate in the world of showbiz, the sadness and joy that are sheltered in that picturesque atmosphere, the springs that are set in motion To put on a play, everything is observed directly by the audience.".

The well-known Moulin Rouge of Paris-style shows in Argentina were at first imported from France by the Mistinguete group. Hilda was ready to change her acting style to a more vamp style according to the requirements of that type of musical show. The producer asked her to also change her last name because it didn't sound attractive for burlesque shows. He suggested she reverse her first name to Dehil and use it as her last name. Since 1944, her acting name has been Hilda Dehil, which she started to use right away.

"Cantina VS. Colmao", a burlesque vaudeville act that performed at the Marconi Theater in 1944 for a full year with Rafael Alberti, It was followed by another picaresque comedy called "Si mi marido supiera lo que hago"(If my husband knew what I do), a mischievous vaudeville that lasted for a year at the Ateneo Theater in the year 1945, with Tono Andreu, Nené Cao, Tito Climent, Susy Derqui, and others.

There she continued on to the theater BATACLAN with the vaudeville musical revue called "La Revista Chinesa" as the principal vedette, with well-known singer Tita Merello, where she was announced as “Una diosa de la calle Corrientes” (goodness of Corrientes Avenue). Also in the Cosmopolita Theater and Politeama Theater, which were located in Corrientes 1490, with the same style of musical shows.

== Personal life ==
Hilda Dehil died in Barcelona on September 8, 1978, of an unexpected stroke that killed her instantly while she was accompanying her son Jorge Perez Evelyn on his tour of Europe.
