= The Drug Addicts =

Los Drogadictos
- Directed by: Enrique Carreras
- Written by: Enrique Carreras; José P. Dominiani
- Edited by: Jorge Gárate
- Release date: 13 September 1979
- Running time: 86 minutes
- Country: Argentina
- Language: Spanish

The Drug Addicts (Los Drogadictos) is a 1979 Argentine comedy film drama directed by Enrique Carreras.

== Cast ==
- Graciela Alfano
- Luis Aranda
- Giancarlo Arena
- Héctor Armendáriz
- Jacques Arndt
- Vicente Buono
- Juan José Camero
- Mercedes Carreras
- Rudy Carrié
- Luis Corradi
- Hector Doldi
- Carlos Estrada
- Raúl Florido
- Ricardo Greco
- Ricardo Jordán
- Juan Carlos Lamas
- Norma López Monet
- Mario Lozano
- Carlos Luzzieti
- Constanza Maral
- Adrián Martel
- Aldo Mayo
- Héctor Méndez
- Rodolfo Onetto
- Adriana Parets
- Mario Pasik
- Oscar Pedemonti
- Joaquín Piñón
- Oscar Roy
- Abel Sáenz Buhr
- Jorge Salcedo
- Jorge Sassi
- Ricardo Suñe
- Nino Udine
- Myriam de Urquijo
- Gonzalo Urtizberéa
- Carlos Vanoni
- Orlando Zumpano
- Dobo Jacobo
