= The Orchid (film) =

1951 film by Ernesto Arancibia

- Directed by: Ernesto Arancibia
- Written by: Ulises Petit de Murat
- Cinematography: Alberto Etchebehere
- Edited by: José Serra
- Music by: Juan Ehlert
- Production company: Argentina Sono Film
- Release date: 1951
- Running time: 91 minutes
- Country: Argentina
- Language: Spanish

The Orchid (Spanish:La orquídea) is a 1951 Argentine drama film directed by Ernesto Arancibia during the classical era of Argentine cinema.

== Cast ==
- Enrique Chaico
- Eduardo Cuitiño
- Diana de Córdoba
- Rafael Diserio
- Alfredo Distasio
- Aurelia Ferrer
- Herminia Franco
- Santiago Gómez Cou
- Laura Hidalgo
- Robert Le Vigan as The father
- Paola Loew
- Maruja Lopetegui
- Domingo Mania
- Felisa Mary
- Liana Moabro
- Luis Mora
- Juan Carlos Palma
- Jesús Pampín
- Arsenio Perdiguero
- Julián Pérez Ávila
- Hilda Rey
- Luis Rodrigo
- Daniel Tedeschi
