= Marty Cosens =

Argentine singer, actor and television presenter (1935–2001)

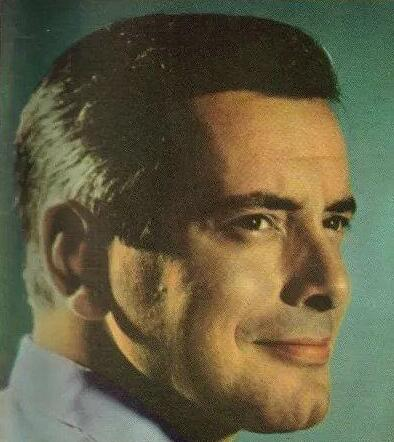
- Cosens in 1965
- Born: Rubén Mario Cosentino; 1 September 1935; Buenos Aires, Argentina
- Died: 20 August 2001 (aged 65); Buenos Aires, Argentina

Rubén Mario Cosentino (1 September 1935 – 20 August 2001), best known as Marty Cosens, was an Argentine singer, actor, television presenter and record producer.

== Life and career ==
Born in Buenos Aires, Cosens started his career on stage and then became popular thanks to the radio. He had his breakout in 1960, thanks to a number of twist hit songs from his album Explosivos.

Starting from the show Tropicana Club that he co-hosted with Chico Novarro, he also worked as a television presenter. In 1972, he moved for several years to Mexico, where he successfully continued his acting and musical career. Returned to Argentina, he starred in the first Argentine stage version of Chicago, then in the musical "Corrientes de Lujo" in 1976, with Chico Novarro, Estela Raval,Jorge Perez Evelyn as vedette and Betty Lascaris from the Moulin Rouge of Paris. Musical Corrientes de Lujo He topped the charts with the album El profesor de violín and had a major television success hosting the Canal 9 show Sábados en familia. Also active in films and TV-series, he died from an incurable disease on 20 August 2001, at the age of 65.
