= Ben Molar =

Argentine author and producer

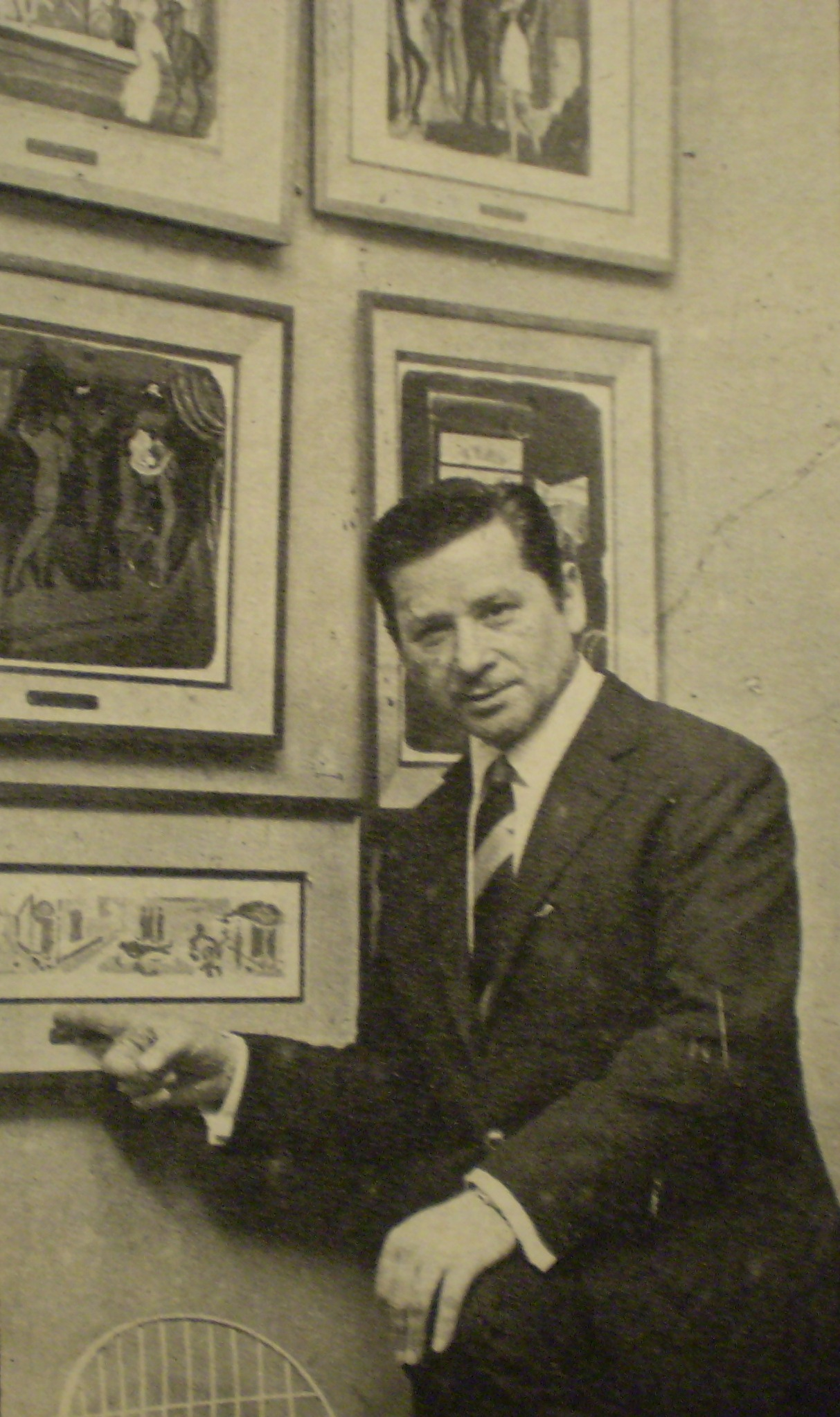
- Born: Moisés Smolarchik Brenner; 3 October 1915; Buenos Aires, Argentina
- Died: 25 April 2015 (aged 99); Buenos Aires, Argentina
- Occupation(s): author, composer, musical producer, talent scout
- Years active: 1906-1941
- Known for: creator of the National Day of the Tango (11 December)

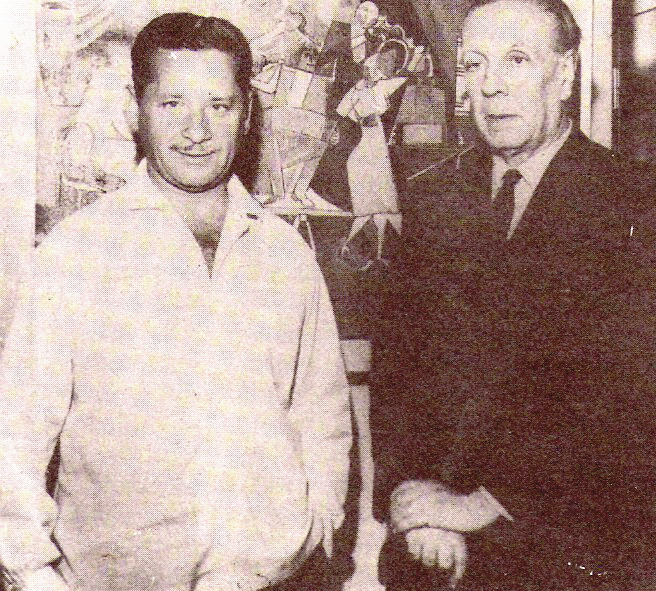
Molar with the Argentine writer Jorge Luis Borges

Ben Molar (3 October 1915 – 25 April 2015) was an Argentine author, composer, musical producer, and talent scout. He created the National Day of the Tango, held annually on 11 December, placed bronze plaques on all 40 corners of Calle Corrientes and produced an interdisciplinary artistic project that combined art, poetry, and music to promote Argentine tango.

== Biography ==
Moisés Smolarchik Brenner was born on 3 October 1915 at Calles Montevideo and Corrientes in Buenos Aires, Argentina to Jewish immigrants León Smolarchik and Fanny Brenner. From childhood Molar sang with the neighborhood street musicians and at a very early age began writing songs. He worked for a time in a framing factory and did his military service in 1937 in the Regiment of Patricios. His first songwriting success came when he wrote Spanish interpretations of Silent Night by Franz Gruber and Jingle Bells by James Pierpont, which at the time had no Castilian versions.

He had trouble convincing the musicians who frequented the cafés of Calle Corrientes to perform his songs until he became friends with the French pianist Paul Misraki, who had immigrated to Argentina in 1942, suggested he "become French". At that point, Moisés Smolarchik became Ben Molar, who supposedly came from Paris began composing boleros, which were very popular at the time. Quickly, some of the most important names among the bolero singers—Juan Arvizu, Gregory Barrios, Elvira Rios and Pedro Vargas—began to include his works in their repertoires.

Molar was an ambitious talent scout, a shrewd businessman, who had a good ear for what the general public and young people were interested in hearing. He was one of the key figures who helped promote Argentine tango albums from the 1950s to the 1970s. As the owner of the label Fermata he both promoted local talent like Mercedes Sosa, El Club del Clan, Los Abuelos de la Nada and Los 5 Latinos and discovered talent, like Miguel Peralta, who performed in his early career as Miguel Abuelo. He also created famous ensembles like The Golden Triplets and adapted songs by Paul Anka, the Beatles, Chubby Checker, Bill Haley, Elvis Presley, Neil Sedaka and others for Spanish singers like Sandro and Palito Ortega.

One of his most important works was project he created and produced called "Los 14 con el Tango" which included interdisciplinary works of literature, music and painting, by such artists as Carlos Alonso, Jorge Luis Borges, Carlos Cañás, Juan D'Arienzo, Florencio Escardó, Raquel Forner, Córdoba Iturburu, Leopoldo Marechal, Manuel Mujica Láinez, Astor Piazzolla, Ernesto Sábato, Raúl Soldi and Aníbal Troilo, among others. The work featured 14 artists of each discipline, covering the cultural history of Argentina and covered various styles of tango: the tango, the tango song, tango milonga, tango de vanguardia and tango lunfardo. The work received multiple awards.

Among other honors, he received the title of Citizen of Buenos Aires, and was a member of the National Tango Academy of Argentina, the Academy of Lunfardo Porteña and served on the board of directors of the Argentine-Israeli Cultural Institute. It was Molar who proposed a National Day of the Tango and suggested the date should be 11 December annually to coincide with the date of birth of Carlos Gardel (1890) and Julio de Caro (1899). Another of his ideas to promote the tango was to place bronze plaques on all 40 corners of Calle Corrientes featuring well known stars such as Enrique Cadícamo, Libertad Lamarque, Raúl Lavié, Tita Merello, Mariano Mores, Horacio Salgán and Tania.

He was married to actress Pola Neuman, with whom he had two children: Daniel and Ruben Brenner. Molar died on 25 April 2015 in Buenos Aires.

== Filmography ==
=== Acting ===
- Los guardianes del ángel (2004)
- Merello x Carreras (2015)

=== Composer ===
- Fascinación (1949) Theme
- Yo soy el criminal (1951)
- ((Mi Lejano Amor))(1957)
- Los días ardientes (1966)
- Patricia mía (1961)
- Un Elefante color ilusión (1970) Theme

=== Musical scores ===
- Navidad de los pobres (1947) (interpretation)
- Punto y banca (1959)
- Días calientes (1966)

=== Soundtrack ===
- Barcelona (1994)
- Alas, poder y pasión (1998)
