= The Count of Monte Cristo (1953 film) =

1953 film by León Klimovsky

- Directed by: León Klimovsky
- Written by: Alexandre Dumas (novel); León Klimovsky; Ulises Petit de Murat
- Produced by: Carmelo Vecchione
- Starring: Jorge Mistral; Elina Colomer; Santiago Gómez Cou
- Cinematography: Alberto Etchebehere
- Edited by: Jorge Gárate
- Music by: Juan Ehlert
- Production companies: Argentina Sono Film; Cinematográfica Calderón
- Release date: 8 September 1953
- Running time: 102 minute
- Countries: Argentina; Mexico
- Language: Spanish

The Count of Monte Cristo (Spanish: El Conde de Montecristo) is a 1953 Argentine-Mexican historical adventure film directed by León Klimovsky during the classical era of Argentine cinema. It stars Jorge Mistral, Elina Colomer and Santiago Gómez Cou, and is based on Alexandre Dumas's 1844 novel The Count of Monte Cristo.

== Cast ==
- Jorge Mistral as Edmundo Dantés / Conde de Montecristo
- Elina Colomer as Haydee
- Santiago Gómez Cou as Villefort
- Nelly Meden as Mercedes
- Ariel Absalón
- Ricardo Argemí
- Francisco Audenino
- Fina Basser
- Ernesto Bianco as Fernando Mondego
- Margot Cottens
- José De Angelis
- Josefa Goldar
- Francisco López Silva as Abate Faria
- Federico Mansilla
- Nathán Pinzón as Danglars
- Ángel Prio
- Daniel Tedeschi
