= Chico Novarro =

Argentine singer-songwriter and composer (1934–2023)

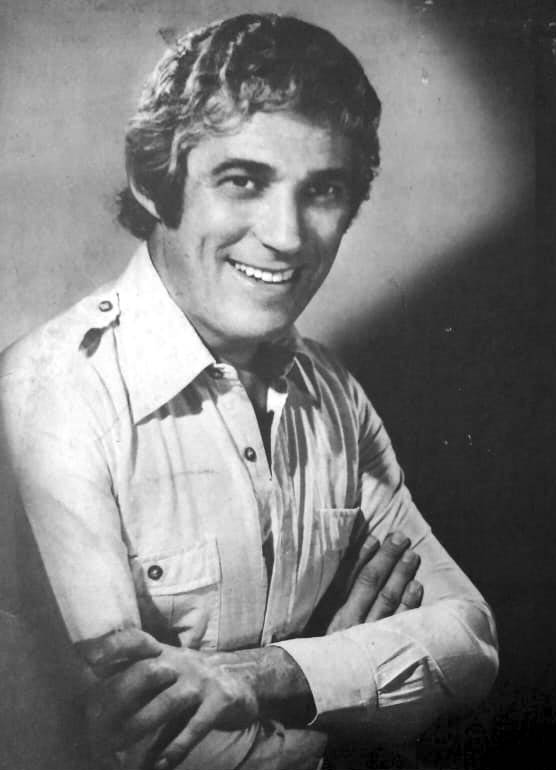
- Novarro in 1975
- Born: Bernardo Mitnik; 4 September 1934; Santa Fe, Argentina
- Died: 18 August 2023 (aged 88); Buenos Aires, Argentina

Bernardo Mitnik (4 September 1934 – 18 August 2023), best known as Chico Novarro, was an Argentine singer-songwriter, composer, musician, television presenter and actor. He was specialized in tango and bolero compositions.

== Life and career ==
Born in Santa Fe, the son of a Ukrainian shoemaker and a Jewish housewife of Romanian origin, Novarro started studying music at young age; as an adolescent he moved to Córdoba to cure his asthma, and there he began playing drums in a jazz band and in an orchestra. In 1956 he joined the jazz ensemble Agrupación Nuevo Jazz, which also included Gato Barbieri. In 1961, he moved to Buenos Aires, where he briefly joined the jazz band Swing Timers, and formed the duo Los Navarros with Raúl Bonetto, recording an album for RCA.

Novarro had his breakout as a cast member of the 1962-4 Canal 13 musical show Club del Clan, which gave him immediate notoriety and made him a teen idol. He soon started releasing successful albums, and authoring hits for other singers including Palito Ortega and Violeta Rivas.

Between late 1960s and 1970s Novarro collaborated several times with María Elena Walsh. In 1975 he was in a big musical named "Corrientes de Lujo" in the European style Sans Souci Music hall, with Estela Raval, Marty Cosens and Jorge Perez Evelyn.. In the early 1970s, he collaborated with Eladia Blázquez, who introduced him to the tango composition. Another notable collaboration was with Rubén Juárez, who starting from 1983 recorded several of his songs, also duetting with him in "Cordón" and "El último round". Starting from the late 1980s he had a large stage success with the show Arráncame la vida.

Among Novarro's major hits were "Carta de un león a otro", the OTI Festival 1979 winner "Cuenta conmigo", "Algo contigo", "El camaleón", "Cómo". During his career he composed over sixty hundred songs, as well as film scores and incidental music. Beyond boleros and tangos, he also composed pop, rock, jazz, and cumbia songs. He also appeared in several films, mostly comedies. He died on 18 August 2023, at the age of 89.
