= The Tunnel (1952 film) =

1952 film

- Directed by: León Klimovsky
- Written by: León Klimovsky
- Based on: The Tunnel by Ernesto Sábato
- Starring: Laura Hidalgo; Carlos Thompson; Bernardo Perrone
- Cinematography: Antonio Merayo
- Edited by: Jorge Gárate
- Music by: Alejandro Gutiérrez del Barrio
- Production companies: Vicente Blanco, C.A; Argentina Sono Film
- Distributed by: Argentina Sono Film
- Release date: 1 April 1952
- Running time: 94 minutes
- Country: Argentina
- Language: Spanish

The Tunnel (Spanish: El túnel) is a 1952 Argentine drama film directed by León Klimovsky and starring Laura Hidalgo, Carlos Thompson and Bernardo Perrone. It is an adaptation of the 1948 novel The Tunnel by Ernesto Sábato. It was made by the noted studio Argentina Sono Film. The film's sets were designed by the art director Gori Muñoz.

== Synopsis ==
In Buenos Aires the talented but tormented painter Juan Pablo Castel becomes besotted with María, particularly when he realises she truly understands his art. The two form a relationship but his intense, paranoid feelings towards his muse push him towards madness.

== Cast ==
- Laura Hidalgo as María Iribarne
- Carlos Thompson as Juan Pablo Castel
- Bernardo Perrone as Allende
- Maruja Gil Quesada as Mimí
- Beba Bidart as Dora
- Santiago Gómez Cou as Hunter
- Pascual Pelliciota
- Miguel Ligero
- Ricardo Lavié
- Enrique Fava
- Margarita Burke
- Rodolfo Martincho
- Fausto Padín
- Alfredo Distasio
- Juan Ehlert
- Guillermo Witte
- Inés Tolosa

== Bibliography ==
- King, John & Torrents, Nissa (ed.) The Garden of Forking Paths: Argentine Cinema. British Film Institute, 1988.
- Mira, Alberto. Historical Dictionary of Spanish Cinema. Scarecrow Press, 2010.
