= Anita Bobasso =

Argentine actress and singer (1896–1996)

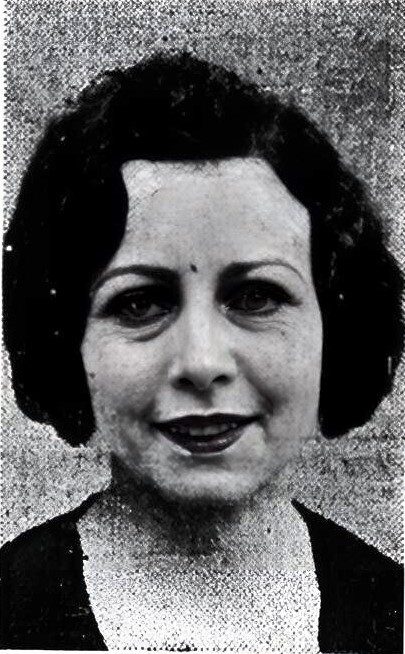
- Anita Bobasso in Buenos Aires
- Born: Ana Felisa Pelosi; October 20, 1896; Buenos Aires, Argentina
- Died: January 5, 1996 (aged 99); Buenos Aires, Argentina
- Occupations: Actor, singer
- Years active: 1910-1992
- Children: Hilda Bobasso
- Relatives: Jorge Pérez Evelyn (grandson)

Anita Bobasso (Buenos Aires, October 20, 1896 – January 5, 1996) was an Argentine actress and tango singer who worked throughout the Americas and Europe, especially in Brazil, where she was well known, including works in radio broadcasting, theater, and cinema. The musical shows in which she participated used everything from typical costumes to informal and elegant dances. Bobasso also performed on a world tour with Libertad Lamarque and Azucena Maizani.

== Early life ==
Anita made her debut in the year 1926, as seen in the published books search results. The "Argentine Theater Yearbook" part of the "Encyclopedia of the Argentine Scene", shows that Anita, affectionately called "Anita del Plata" (named after the river that borders the city) by her fans and the press, was born in the capital of Argentina and debuted in the town of Bernal in the function where the Hall of the Italian Society was inaugurated. A season at the Summer Theater followed. (Page 425). In the book "Who's Who in Spanish-American Theater and Cinema", Anita acted alongside Manuel Antin, an Argentine playwright, film director, scriptwriter, and journalist. (Page 58). In the book "Tra-la-la", it says that Anita Bobasso soon conquered the audience. She speaks Italian, sings, and dances; she does not lose a single effect. page (367).

== Career ==
She worked with Azucena Maizani during a tour through Spain and Portugal in 1931, starting at the Alcázar Theater in Madrid. Presentations continued in Alicante, Barcelona, Bilbao, Burgos, Santiago de Compostela, Teruel, Valladolid, Santander, San Sebastián, and Huesca, and presentations were also held in Gijón, Zamora, Valencia, Palma, and Zaragoza where "La Voz de Aragon" noted in its Page 13, under "Los Teatros y los Cines" ( theaters and cinemas) "The day after tomorrow, Tuesday, the company will make its presentation at the municipal coliseum. This is the list of integrants: Azucena Maizani, Anita Bobasso, Oterito de Naya, between others. The three works that are in the repertoire They are titled "Mozaicos Argentinos", "Under the Sky of the Pampa" and "Canción Criolla", based on staged tangos, poetry from the countryside and the suburbs, Creole evocations, native dances, and concert numbers. This company's performance in Zaragoza will last six days. The newspaper "El Heraldo de Madrid", invited the company to visit its editorial office on September 16, 1931. The Madrid newspaper La Libertad published in its "theaters" section on page 4 (among other artists) about the great Anita Bobasso, who enjoyed the applause of the select audience that filled the room. Poetry, song, and music festival in honor of the Argentine company to correspond to the kindness they had when inviting authors, artists, and journalists to the extraordinary function offered to them in the Alcazar theater, as noted by the Madrid newspaper.

As shown in the archives from 1931, in the city of Barcelona, the premiere of the show "Argentine Mosaics" was announced at the Poliorama Theater. The newspaper El Grafico of Barcelona comments that "Argentine songs, like Andalusian songs, have nostalgia and sentimentality that they express because they are laments of the people. The newspaper adds that "artists as well-known as Anita Bobasso are among the others in this Azucena Maizani show". Valencia and then Palma de Mallorca were the next stops for the musical. The article about Teatro en Palma in the newspaper "Ultima Hora"'s "Actualidad Teatral" section states that "Azucena Maizani's company's debut, announced at the Theater Lirico, has to be postponed due to the success obtained at the Theater Apolo in Valencia, which has led to a three-day extension at that theater.

After finally getting to Palma, the archives of the historic press show that in the Theater in Palma, Anita Bobasso is named among those who were highly applauded and who gave it life with success, which is peculiar to the set of scenes included in the Creole copla. See in page 4 for "Los Teatros-Alkazar.

The archives of "La Prensa Historica" show more than a dozen links to articles talking about Anita, where her husband Andres Bobasso also appears as stage director of the company.

In April 1932, they undertook a tour of Portugal, starting from the María Victoria Theater in Lisbon and continuing to Porto, Braga, Coimbra, and the famous Estoril Casino. She also performed in Biarritz, the birthplace of her father, and returned to Buenos Aires that same year.

After returning to Buenos Aires, Bobasso was invited to Brazil, where she premiered the musical "La Cancion Argentina" at the Casino Theater in Rio de Janeiro. where she enjoyed great popularity and stayed for a long time, along with her daughter Hilda Bobasso.

The carioca newspaper "O Jornal" states in Radio Journal that Anita, the typical Argentine singer, has just been hired by Mayrink Veiga to sing his repertoire of tangos and rancheras and how much she has pleased the casino public at her recent performance for the "Typical Company Argentina," in which Anita is a prominent element. She began a national tour with her husband and Hilda, which took place in 1933. with their musical in the Brazilian city of Recife. The newspaper named her "a faithful interpreter of Argentine tango." then back to Rio de Janeiro, and continuing to Pernambuco in the north of Brazil and to Vitoria, the state of Espiritu Santo, as seen in the Diario da Manha, presenting 23 musical scenes in two acts in the Theater Carlos Gomes of that city., and then to the state of Maranhao, where the press noted "A big company from Argentina is visiting Maranhao with artists like Bobasso who have achieved success in the audience where she has been heard".

Almost 25 years after her death, the press continues to talk about her and remember her, as reflected in this article published in 2020. É de amargar (it's bitter).On January 25, 1934, was presented at the Teatro Deodoro, in the center of Maceió, the musical Tangos e Canciones, with two acts and 19 musical scenes. "The carnival march of the journal of Pernambuco "É de Amargar" [by Capiba] and the waltz "Nasci" were sung with great success, which are said to be authored by the conductor, director, and concertist of the company called Jerônimo Cabral, admirably interpreted by the star Anita Bobasso (as seen in the article of "Historias de Alagoas" published on July 13, 2020).

She was also proudly called by the citizens of Buenos Aires (porteños) Anita del Plata, named after the river in Buenos Aires, meaning that "she belongs to the river...she belongs to Buenos Aires", as shown in the search results of books.

== Later life ==
She lived in the area of the obelisk near 9 de Julio on Alsina Street in Buenos Aires until 1968, when her husband, Andrés Bobasso, died. He was one of the attendees at Sarrasani, the best-known circus of the time. When her husband died, the sadness of having lost the partner of her entire life invaded her, and she went to live at the Casa del Teatro (theater house for actors) on Avenida Santa Fe with other actors, where she died in 1996 surrounded by her theater colleagues.

During her last years she dedicated herself to the cinema, participating in films such as El Gordo catástrofe, the movie Grandma and Funny Dirty Little War, playing the role of the singer.

== Personal life ==
Her mother, Julia Rival, was from Italy and her father, Aquiles Pelosi, was from Biarritz, France. Pelosi died on the ship that brought them from Europe. Bobasso was interested in languages and was fluent in Portuguese thanks to years of singing in Brazil. The newspaper "O Radical" of Rio de Janeiro shows Anita as part of the "O Brillante Festival da Casa dos Artistas" (a brilliant festival in the house of the artists).

== Filmography ==
Title	Year
El Gordo Catastrofe	1977
Grandma	1979
Funny Dirty Little War	1983
