= Mientras haya un circo =

- Directed by: Carlos F. Borcosque
- Written by: Carlos Borcosque
- Starring: Adrianita; Carlos Borsani
- Cinematography: Julio C. Lavera
- Music by: Eber Lobato
- Release date: 1958
- Running time: 67 minutes
- Country: Argentina
- Language: Spanish

Mientras haya un circo is a 1958 Argentine comedy film directed by Carlos F. Borcosque and starring Adrianita and Carlos Borsani.

== Cast ==
- Adrianita
- Carlos Borsani
- Guillermo Longoni
- Mercedes Carreras
- Eber Lobato
- Nélida Lobato
- María Luisa Santés
- Carlos Gouthié
- Carlos Borcosque (junior)
- Oscar Orlegui
