= The Three Perfect Wives =

1953 film

- Directed by: Roberto Gavaldón
- Written by: Roberto Gavaldón; Mauricio Magdaleno; José Revueltas
- Based on: The Three Perfect Wives by Alejandro Casona
- Produced by: Gregorio Walerstein
- Starring: Arturo de Córdova; Laura Hidalgo; Miroslava.
- Cinematography: Agustín Martínez Solares
- Edited by: Juan José Marino
- Music by: Antonio Díaz Conde
- Production company: Cinematográfica Filmex
- Distributed by: Cinematográfica Filmex
- Release date: 12 March 1953
- Running time: 110 minutes
- Country: Mexico
- Language: Spanish

The Three Perfect Wives (Spanish: Las tres perfectas casadas) is a 1953 Mexican romantic drama film directed by Roberto Gavaldón and starring Arturo de Córdova, Laura Hidalgo and Miroslava. It is based on the eponymous play by Alejandro Casona. The film's sets were designed by the art director Jorge Fernández. It was entered into the 1953 Cannes Film Festival.

== Synopsis ==
The tranquility of three married couples is interrupted when after the death of Gustavo Ferrán (Arturo de Córdova), a mutual friend leaves a letter saying that he was the lover of the three women. When he reappears, nothing will ever be the same again.

== Cast ==
- Arturo de Córdova as Gustavo Ferran
- Laura Hidalgo as Ada
- Miroslava as Leopoldina
- José María Linares-Rivas as Javier
- René Cardona as Jorge
- José Elías Moreno as Máximo
- Consuelo Frank as Genoveva
- Alma Delia Fuentes as Clara
- Arturo Soto Rangel as Francisco
- Armando Sáenz as Luciano
- Francisco Jambrina as Doctor
- Lidia Franco as Sirvienta

== Bibliography ==
- Amador, María Luisa. Cartelera cinematográfica, 1950-1959. UNAM, 1985.
- Riera, Emilio García. Historia del cine mexicano. Secretaría de Educación Pública, 1986.
