= Clouds of Smoke (1959 film) =

Nubes de humo
- Film poster
- Directed by: Enrique Carreras
- Written by: Enrique Carreras
- Starring: Alberto Castillo; Mercedes Carreras; María Luisa Santés; Francisco Álvarez
- Cinematography: Alfredo Traverso
- Edited by: José Gallego
- Music by: Vlady
- Production company: Producciones Vicente Marco
- Distributed by: Producciones Vicente Marco
- Release date: May 14, 1959
- Running time: 70 minutes
- Country: Argentina
- Language: Spanish

Clouds of Smoke (Nubes de humo) is a 1959 Argentine musical (tango) comedy film directed and written by Enrique Carreras. It stars tango singer Alberto Castillo, Mercedes Carreras, María Luisa Santés and Francisco Álvarez and was released on 14 May 1959. The film, Castillo's last, is dedicated to the memory of film director Manuel Romero.

== Plot ==
An amateur tango student who gave up singing when he finished his degree, relapses.

== Cast ==
- Alberto Castillo
- Mercedes Carreras
- María Luisa Santés
- Francisco Álvarez
- Alberto Bello
- Nélida Lobato
- Eber Lobato
- Francisco Canaro
- Héctor Armendáriz
- Mario Baroffio
- Susana Rubio
- Juan Villarreal
- Elvira Joaquina Rodrígues Lima

== Music ==
The music for the film was composed by Vlady. Alberto Castillo sings songs such as "Así se baila el tango". Archivo de la Filmoteca notes that the film fused together influences of Tango and rumba with rock and roll and that Carreras's films "combine new rhythms and incorporate young generations".

== Reception ==
Tulio Carella said in Crítica: "A long story is told in Nubes de humo. The film is minor and poorly plotted. It does, however, offer a few moments of excitement and some not-too-old-fashioned jokes." Jorge Miguel Couselo opined in Correo de la Tarde that it was "another tawdry film". Raúl Manrupe and María Alejandra Portela in their book Un diccionario de films argentinos (1930–1995) wrote (translated from Spanish): "Crepuscular title of a kind of cinema which tends towards more pop (there's a scene with rock and roll music) and which repeats scenes in a framework of falsehood."
