= Zaima Beleño =

Panamanian actor and singer

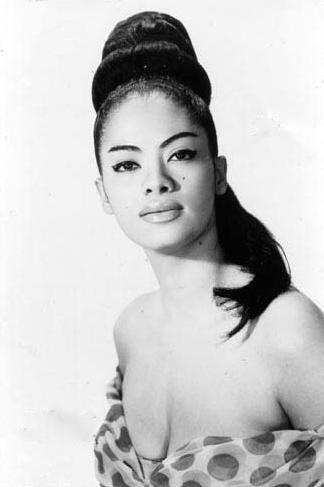
- Born: Clara Beleño; October 3, 1938; Panama
- Died: March 6, 2026 (aged 87); Buenos Aires, Argentina
- Occupations: Actress, singer, dancer

Zaima Beleño (3 October 1938 – 6 March 2026) was an Panameñan singer, actress, dancer and vedette. Born in Panama, she traveled to Cuba as a young child.

== Movies ==
- 1966: Ritmo, amor y juventud
- 1967: Mi secretaria está loca, loca, loca
- 1968: Humo de marihuana
- 1969: Deliciosamente amoral

== Songs ==
- La gran ciudad
- Nuestras vidas
- Aquellos secretos
- Inolvidable
- Alguien tiene que llorar
- Gracias
- Mentirita
- Dos crios que te buscan
- Qué sabes tú
- Angelitos negros
- Todo lo ocupas tú
- Tú pañuelo
- Tengo que acostumbrarme
- La fiestona
- El pata pata (Odeon "Pop"- 1968)
- La gloria eres tú
- Serenata Mulata

== Theatre ==
- 1962: El festival del Maipo
- 1964: Proceso a la revista
- 1967: Es la frescura
- 1968: Minifalditis
- 1968: Las 40 primaveras
- 1968: Les cantamos las cuarenta
- 1971: Maiporema
