= L'Amour et Psyché, enfants =

1890 painting by William Adolphe Bouguereau

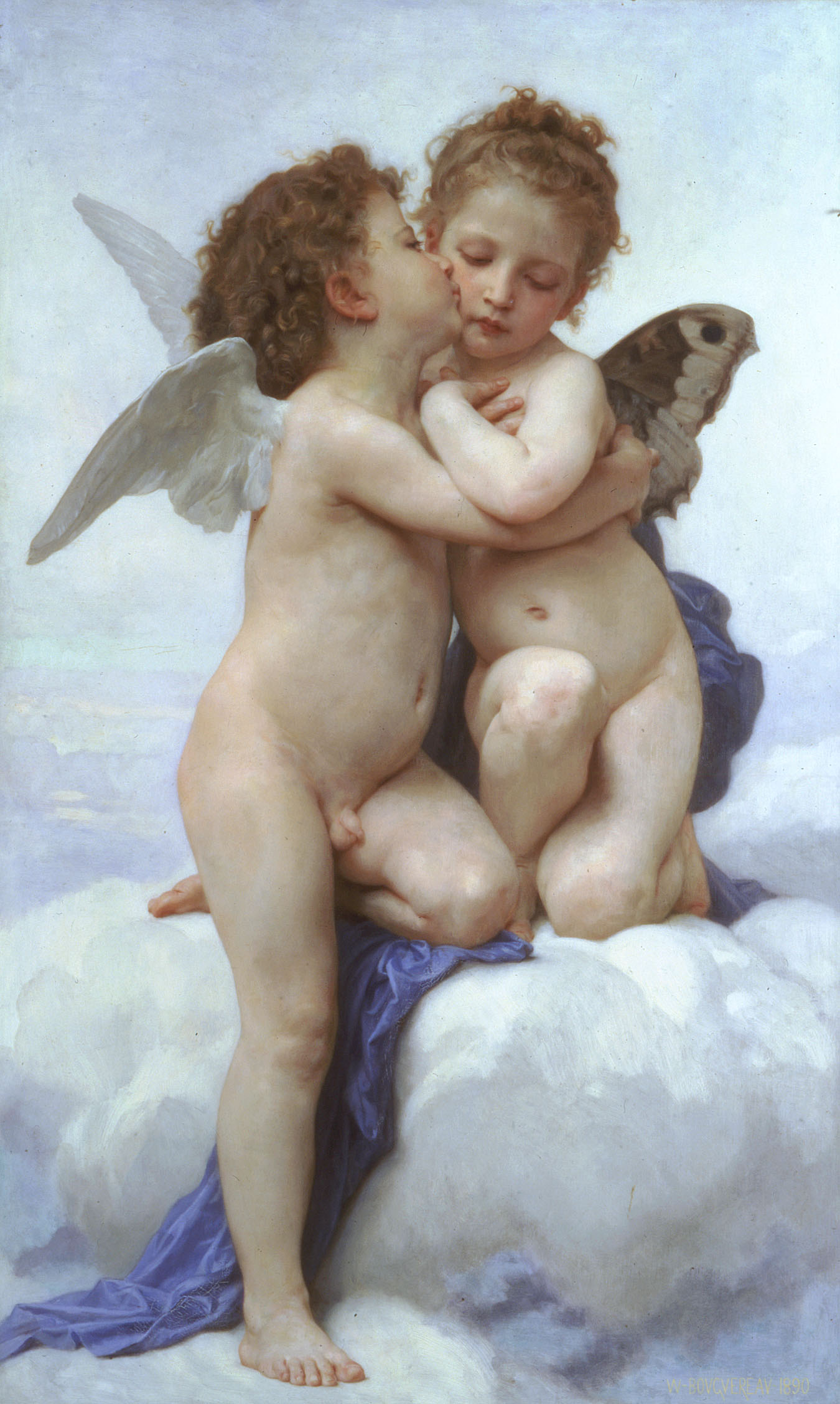
- Artist: William-Adolphe Bouguereau
- Year: 1890
- Medium: Oil on canvas
- Dimensions: 60 cm × 71 cm (20 in × 27 7/8 in)
- Location: Private collection

L'Amour et Psyché, enfants is an oil painting executed by the French painter William Adolphe Bouguereau in 1890. It is currently in a private collection. It was displayed in the Salon of Paris in 1890, the year Bouguereau was President of the Société des Artistes Français. The painting features Greek mythological figures Eros and Psyché, sharing an embrace and kiss. Bouguereau was a classical-style painter in the Neoclassical era of art. The painting is characterized by the frothy background the figures delicately stand on. It depicts the beginning of the forbidden romance of Cupid and Psyche, a popular subject at the time of execution.

== Subject matter ==
The resurgence of interest in Classical Greek and Roman mythology of the mid-eighteenth century gave way for the renderings to the story of Cupid and Psyche. The daughter of a King and Queen, Psyche was born with beauty that led to men worshipping her. This angered Venus, Cupid's mother and Goddess of Beauty. She sent Cupid to prick her with his arrow, forcing her to fall in love with a hideous creature as revenge. Instead, Cupid scratches himself with his own arrow and falls in love with Psyche. He marries her in secrecy on the condition that she may never see his face. He flees when her curiosity gets the better of her. Psyche roams the earth and underworld in search of her lover. They eventually reunite and she is granted the gift of immortality. Their triumph over adversity from Venus and their differences in mortality makes this theme popular.

Cupid, the Roman interpretation of Eros, is often portrayed as a fantastic, mischievous winged baby with a bow and arrow. Eros, the Greek equivalent, is often depicted in as a young man and Psyche as a young woman. Bouguereau chose to portray the characters of Cupid and Psyche as young children, almost babies. He painted Psyche with butterfly wings, for psyche was the Greek word given to butterflies by Aristotle. Psyche is a symbol to the transformation of the human soul, as she transforms from human to immortal. The decision to paint the characters as children is a reference to their innocence, before the corruption of their affair by Venus. In other paintings, Bouguereau depicted Cupid and Psyche as the more familiar young lovers.

== Composition ==
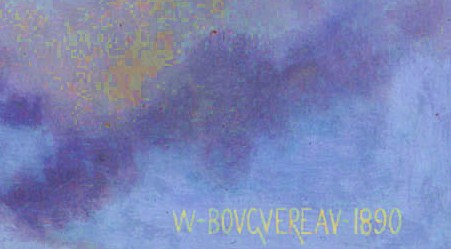
Detail of Bouguereau's signature with the date 1890

The characters of Cupid and Psyche are fixed onto a long, vertical canvas. Cupid places a leg on a cloud for balance, and similarly balances the frame. Limbs interconnect in soft embraces. Bouguereau catches Cupid and Psyche in an inhale of breath, placing a light peck on Psyche's cheek. Her hand almost pushes Cupid away, and she looks down and away from him. The blue cloth floats behind them and onto the surrounding clouds. The focus is on the subjects, who are above the earthly realm and gracefully play in the sky.

The style in which Bouguereau chooses to paint the children is articulated and meaningful. Their white flesh is luminous and rosy, a symbol of their purity. Wings sprout delicately from their shoulders. Bouguereau invokes whimsical elements of childhood and young love through the use of pastels and soft, velvety brushstrokes. The painting is mostly blue, an uncommon color for the portrayal of a love story. By not using pinks and reds, the painter steers away from the theme of forbidden love and towards the idea of young love. The colors are cool and crisp. Bouguereau takes care to accurately portray the pudginess of Cupid and Psyche. The painting is full of texture from the light fabrics, wispy golden hair, and smoothness of their skin.

== Other paintings by Bouguereau on Cupid and Psyche ==
Bouguereau was inspired by the story of Cupid and Psyche several times:

1. Psyché et l'Amour (Psyche and Cupid, Salon of 1889, No. 260; Exposition Universelle of 1900, No. 242)
2. Psyché (1892)
3. Le ravissement de Psyché (The Abduction of Psyche or The Rapture of Psyche, Salon of 1895, No. 258)
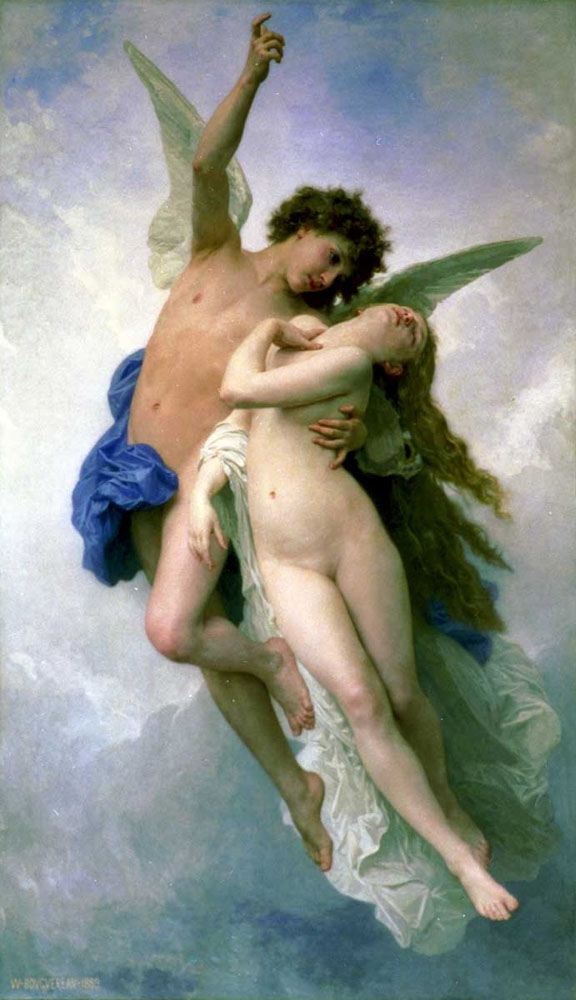
Psyche and Cupid (1889)

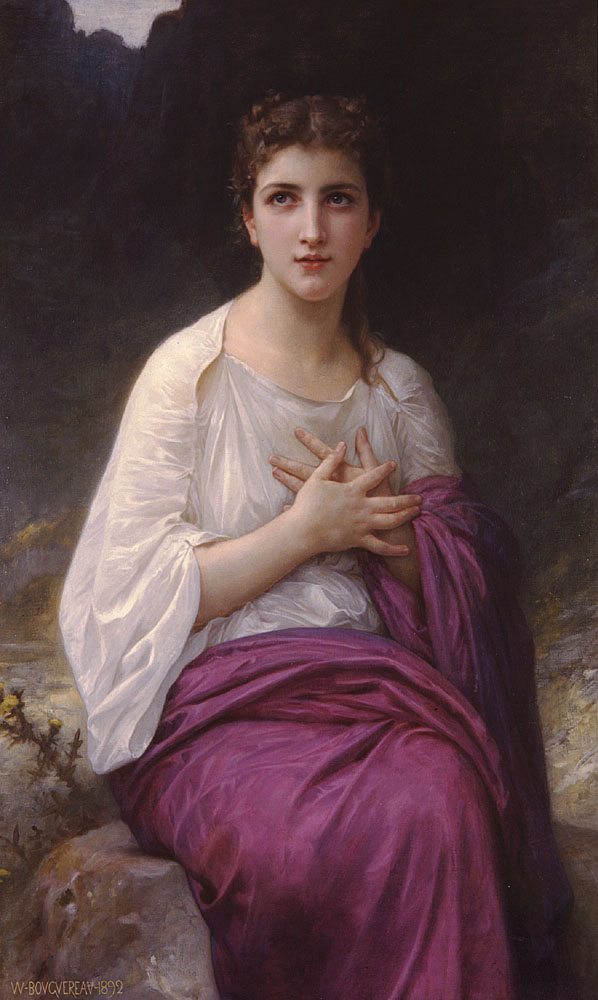
Psyche (1892)

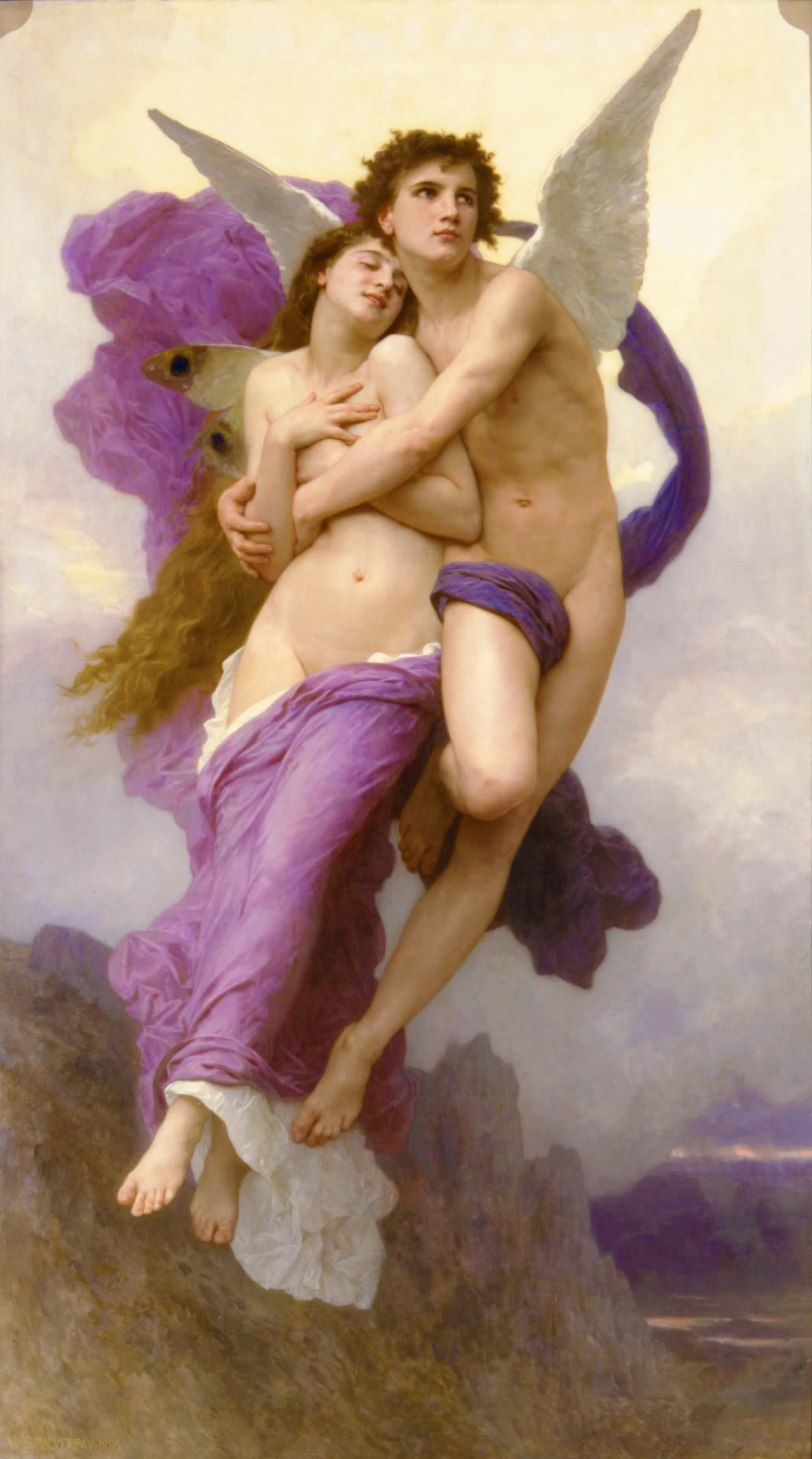
The Abduction of Psyche (1895)
