= Aldo Mario Aroldi =

Italian painter

- Born: 25 March 1899; Casalmaggiore, Italy
- Died: 27 November 1963 (aged 64); Milan, Italy
- Occupation: Painter

Aldo Mario Aroldi (25 March 1899 – 27 November 1963) was an Italian painter. His work was part of the painting event in the art competition at the 1936 Summer Olympics.
