= Emilio Aragón (director) =

Spanish filmmaker

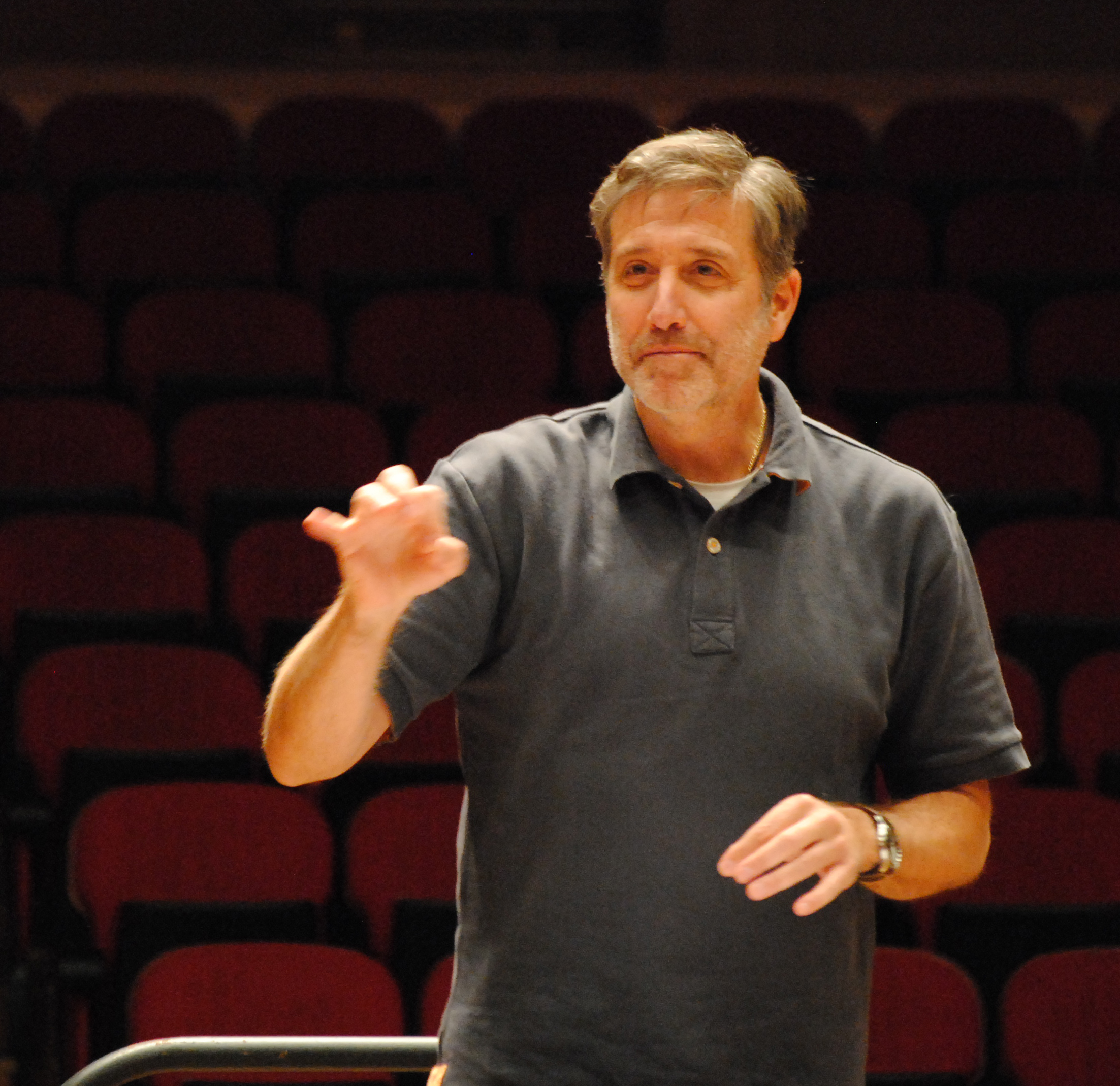
- Born: Emilio Aragón Álvarez; 16 April 1959 (age 67); Havana, Cuba
- Years active: 1977–present

Emilio Aragón Álvarez (born 16 April 1959) is a Spanish director, musician, actor, presenter, and producer.

== Background ==
Emilio Aragón Álvarez was born 16 April 1959 in Havana, Cuba. His father, Emilio Aragón Bermúdez or Miliki, was a clown, along with his grandfather Emilio Aragón Foureaux, known as Emig. He began his career in the program El gran circo de TVE in 1977, using stage name Milikito, with his father, his uncle Gabriel Aragón (Gaby), and his cousin Alfonso Aragón (Fofito) who were better known as Los Payasos de la Tele. He also went in to get his undergraduate degree in history from Suffolk University in Boston, Ma.

He hosted the OTI Festival 1985 along Paloma San Basilio. He was the original presenter of the Spanish game show VIP Noche, which was popular in the 1990s on Telecinco. He later hosted and directed the first season of El gran juego de la oca on Antena 3. Since 2006 he has been the president of the television network La Sexta.

== Filmography ==
- A Night in Old Mexico (director, music composer and producer) (2013)
- Pájaros de papel (director, writer, music composer and producer) (2010) - This film, translated into Russian by Andrey Efremov, was shown in Moscow in June 2011 as part of the Moscow International Film Festival.
- Carlitos y el Campo de los Sueños (music composer and producer) (2008)
