= Alfonso Aragón Bermúdez =

Spanish clown and TV presenter (1923–1976)

Fofó
- Born: Alfonso Aragón Bermúdez; 8 February 1923; Madrid, Spain
- Died: 22 June 1976 (aged 53); Madrid, Spain
- Occupations: Clown, singer

Alfonso Aragón Bermúdez (Madrid, 8 February 1923 - 22 June 1976), better known as Fofó, was a Spanish clown, known as a member of Los payasos de la tele (meaning the TV clowns) group, along with his brothers Miliki and Gaby, and his son Fofito. The group debuted in TVE on 19 July 1973.

== Biography ==
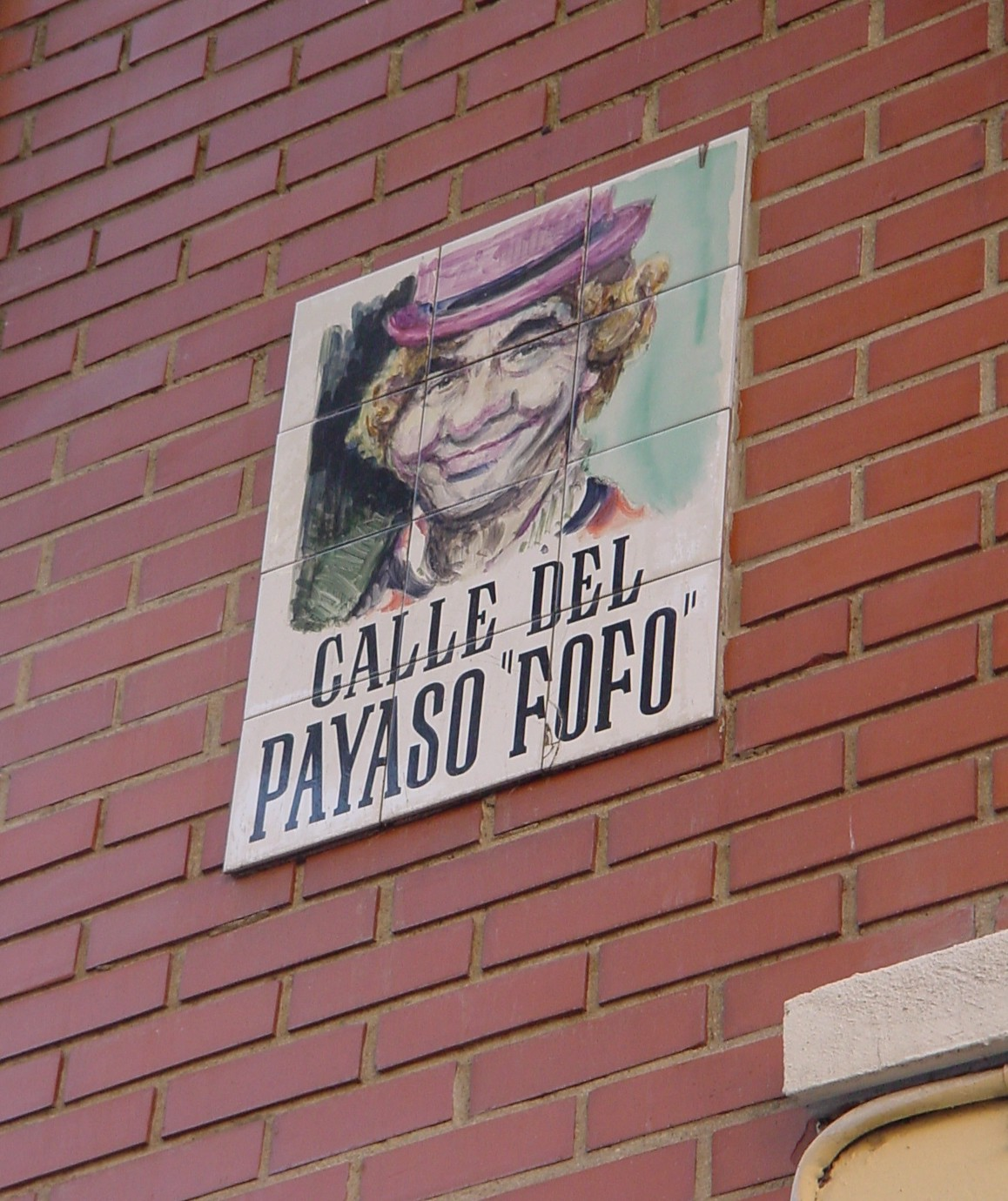
Street named after Fofó in Vallecas, Madrid

He was born in Puente de Vallecas (Madrid), in a family with a long tradition in the circus arts. His father was the clown Emilio Aragón Foureaux, known as Emig.

In 1946, he and his brothers left Spain, moving to Mexico, and later Cuba, where they made their television debut. After the success of their TV show, they took it to other American countries, including Puerto Rico, the USA, Venezuela and Argentina. After that, the brothers returned to Spain in 1972.

In 1976, Fofó had a benign tumor extirpated from his head. He fully recovered from his operation, having even resumed his television work, but on 10 June he was admitted to Fundación Jiménez Díaz hospital in Madrid, where he unexpectedly died on 22 June. The cause of his death was a hepatitis B that he contracted in a blood transfusion after his tumor operation. His death had a great impact in the many Spanish children that followed the clowns on TV at the time. On 24 June, the other clowns talked about his passing to the children. Without Fofó, the show continued on air until 1983.
