= Carlos Llopis =

Spanish dramatist

Carlos Llopis (20 January 1913 – 6 April 1970) was the shortened name used by the Spanish dramatist Carlos Fernández Montero Llopis. He wrote around 50 comedies almost all of which were staged in Madrid and theatres across Spain and Latin America.

== Biography ==
Llopis was born in Madrid. His parents were actors. He came from the same generation as Miguel Mihura and Enrique Jardiel Poncela. Known for original insights and agile dialogues, the tone he cultivated was one of sophisticated bourgeois comedy. The dramatist-critic Alfredo Marquerie described his style as halfway between Arniches and Jardiel. Although he was less celebrated by critics than some of his contemporaries, in his own day many of his dramas were received with much acclaim by theatre audiences.

His more memorable pieces included:

- Nosotros, ellas y el Duende (1946)
- Con la vida del otro (1947)
- ¡Oh, doctor! (1950)
- La cigüeña dijo sí (1951)
- La vida en un bloc (1952)
- ¿De acuerdo, Susana? (1955)
- El amor tiene su aquel (1955)
- En cualquier Puerta del Sol (1956)
- ¿Qué hacemos con los hijos? (1959)
- Mi mujer, el diablo y yo (1962)

Some of these were adapted as films.

Llopis also wrote libretti for several Revues, including La cuarta de A. Polo (1951) and Oriente y accidente (1952) for the comic trio Zori, Santos y Codeso.
