= Aurora del Mar =

Argentine actress (1934–2022)

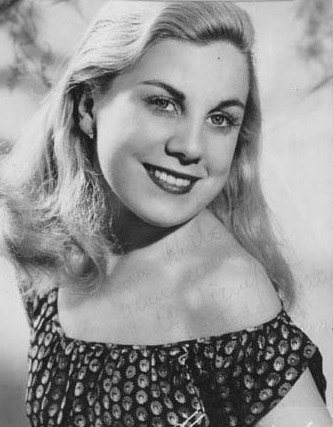
- Born: Aurora Rosa Borrello; 3 July 1934; Bahía Blanca, Argentina
- Died: 15 January 2022 (aged 87); Bernal, Argentina
- Occupation: Actress

Aurora Rosa Borrello (3 July 1934 – 15 January 2022), better known as Aurora del Mar, was an Argentine actress.

== Life and career ==
The daughter of a railroad worker and a housewife, Borrello started her career at 13 years old as a radio actress in the Bahía Blanca radio station LU3 Splendid, where she was noted by a manager of Radio Splendid, who convinced her and her family to move to Buenos Aires. In the Argentinian capital she became a major radio star, working for all the major radio stations of the time, including LRA Radio Nacional, Radio Belgrano, Radio El Mundo, Radio Excelcior, and Radio Argentina. She made her stage debut alongside Luisa Vehil and Alejandro Casona in the drama La casa de los siete balcones, which successfully ran for three years until Borrello had to leave due to a pregnancy.

Borrello adopted her stage name 'Aurora del Mar' in the early 1950s, at the suggestion of journalist María Ofelia. She made her film debut in 1953 in La mejor del colegio by Julio Saraceni, and appeared in over 20 films. Starting from the sixties she gradually focused on television.

== Personal life and death ==
Del Mar died in a retirement home in Bernal, on 15 January 2022, at the age of 87. She was a second cousin of footballer José Borello. Her son Claudio is also an actor.
