= Santiago Gómez Cou =

Uruguayan - Argentine actor

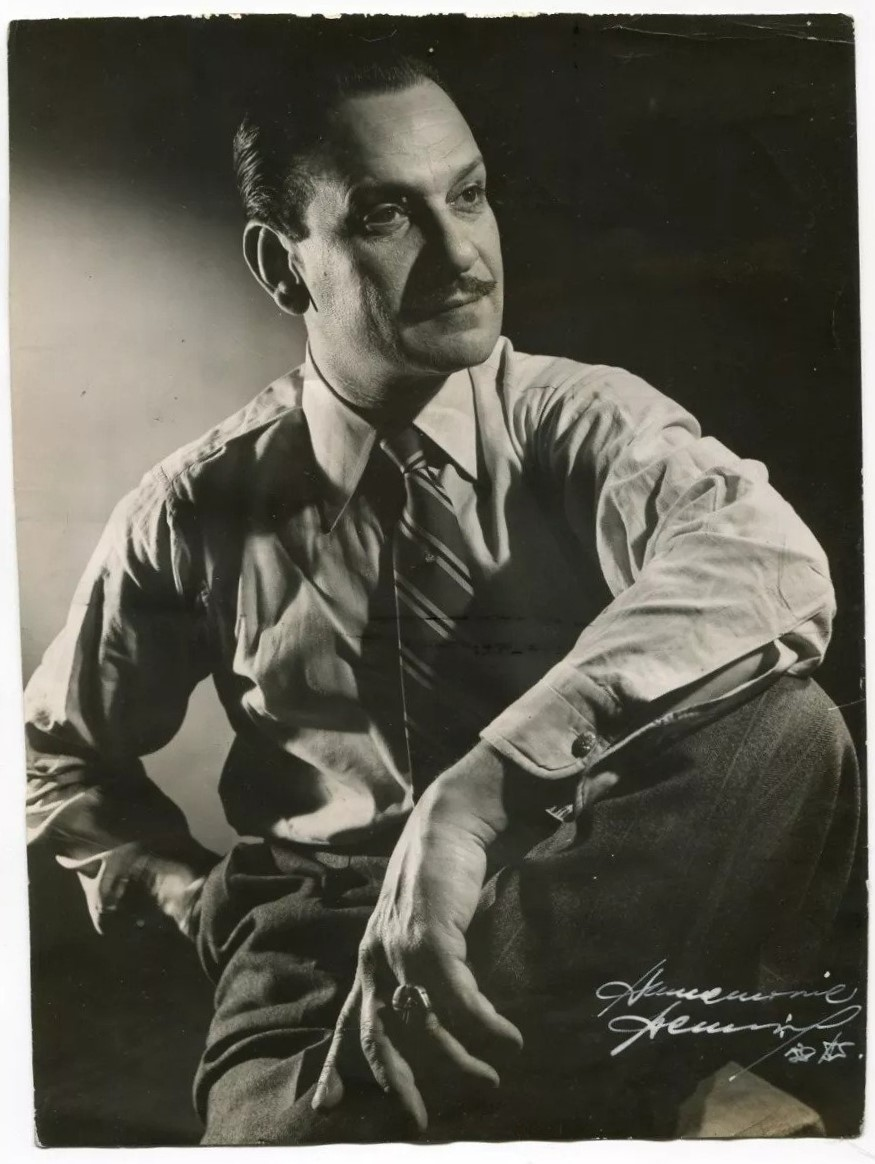
- Santiago Gómez Cou by Annemarie Heinrich
- Born: September 26, 1903; Montevideo, Uruguay
- Died: March 24, 1984 (aged 80); Buenos Aires, Argentina

Santiago Gómez Cousillas (September 26, 1903 in Montevideo, Uruguay – March 24, 1984 in Buenos Aires, Argentina) was a Uruguayan - Argentine actor notable for his work during the classical era of Argentine cinema. Known as Santiago Gómez Cou appeared in 65 films between 1936 and 1980.

== Life ==
Born in Montevideo, Uruguay, Cou moved to Buenos Aires to pursue a career as a screen actor. He appeared in his first film in 1936. He made 65 screen appearances in Argentina and the United States between 1936 and 1980. He appeared in films such as The Grandfather in 1954 alongside actors Enrique Muino and Mecha Ortiz.

== Selected filmography ==
- Ayúdame a vivir (1936)
- The Life of Carlos Gardel (1939)
- Story of a Poor Young Man (1942)
- The Desire (1944)
- A Woman of No Importance (1945)
- The Three Rats (1946)
- An Ideal Husband (1947)
- Arrabelera (1950)
- The Orchid (1951)
- The Tunnel (1952)
- The Lady of the Camellias (1953)
- The Count of Monte Cristo (1953)
- The Black Market (1953)
- El Abuelo (1954)
- La Procesión (1960)
- Crimen sin olvido (1968)
