= Miliki =

Spanish clown and musician

- Born: Emilio Alberto Aragón Bermúdez; 4 November 1929; Carmona (Seville), Spain
- Died: 18 November 2012 (aged 83); Madrid, Spain
- Occupations: Clown, singer
- Years active: 1939–2012

Emilio Alberto Aragón Bermúdez (Spanish pronunciation: [eˈmiljo alˈβeɾto aɾaˈɣom beɾˈmuðeθ]; 4 November 1929 – 18 November 2012), better known as Miliki (pronounced [miˈliki]), was a Spanish clown, accordionist and singer, he was a member of the artist family Aragón. He was declared Son of the City of Carmona and received the Silver Medal of that town.

He was born in Carmona (Seville), Spain, the son of the clown Emilio Aragón Foureaux, known as Emig, and nephew of Pompoff and Thedy. At a very early age he joined his brothers Gabriel (Gaby) and Alfonso (Fofó) to form the trio Gaby, Fofó and Miliki. They began working during the 1930s and held several seasons at the Circo Price in Madrid.

His mother was the horseback acrobat dancer Rocío Bermúdez (born in Carmona) and also had a younger sister, Rocío, a flamenco dancer. He was the father of the famous actor, comedian, musician, filmmaker, composer, clown and entrepreneur audiovisual Emilio Aragón Álvarez, also known as Milikito.

== Los payasos de la tele ==
After a stay in Cuba, Venezuela, Puerto Rico and Argentina, he returned to Spain in 1972 and the following year began work on the TV program El gran circo de TVE, which made the group (which became known as Los payasos de la tele, the TV clowns) a completely sociological phenomenon in Spain. Following the withdrawal of the program in 1983, he left the group and launched a new phase in his career.

== Miliki and Rita Irasema ==
After the professional separation of the clowns, Miliki dedicated to the world of musical production (he launched the band Monano y su banda), and formed an artistic tandem with his daughter Rita Irasema. Together they recorded several albums such as La vuelta al mundo en 30 minutos (1986), El flautista de Hamelín (1987), Vamos a marcarnos una canción (1991) and ¡Superdiscoguay! (1992) or ¿Estás contento? ¡Sí señor! (1994). He also directed the film Yo quiero ser torero (1987)

With the advent of private television in Spain, he returned to television to host children's programs, with his daughter Rita. They hosted La merienda (1990-1991) and La guardería (1990-1991), both in Antena 3, and Superguay (1991-1993) in Telecinco. In 1993, they relaunched on TVE El gran circo de TVE, which lasted until 1995.

== Writer ==
He wrote in 2008 the book La providencia under the pseudonym Emile A. Foureaux aimed at an adult audience, it tells the story of Martín, a guerrilla militant in the Cuban revolution, who has to escape a hunt orchestrated by Fidel Castro in New York.

== Death ==
On November 18, 2012, Miliki died of pneumonia, aged 83, in Madrid. He was also reported to have suffered from Parkinson's disease for the last year of his life.

== Discography ==
=== With Los Payasos de la Tele ===
- Lo que tanto esperé (1950)
- Gaby, Fofó, Miliki y familia en el show de las 5 (1963)
- Pinocho (1965)
- A sus amiguitos
- Adelantando éxitos
- Todos los niños del mundo son nuestros amiguitos
- Había una vez un circo
- Gaby, Fofó, Miliki con Fofito
- Los más grandes éxitos
- Susanita, Papá y Mamá, El Sombrero de Gaspar, etc
- La familia unida
- Había una vez un disco
- Como me pica la nariz
- Cantando, siempre cantando
- El loco mundo de los payasos
- La historia de los payasos

=== With Rita Irasema ===
- La vuelta al mundo en 30 minutos (1986)
- El flautista de Hamelín (1987)
- Vamos a marcarnos una canción (1991)
- ¡Superdiscoguay! (1992)
- ¿Estás contento?, ¡sí señor! (1994)

=== Single ===
==== Studio albums ====
| Year | Title | Label |
| 1999 | A Mis Niños de 30 Años | Crab & Bat |
| 2000 | ¿Cómo están ustedes? | Crab & Bat |
| 2001 | Navidades Animadas | Crab Producciones Musicales |
| 2002 | De película | Crab Producciones Musicales |
| 2003 | El Desván Mágico de Miliki | Crab Producciones Musicales |
| 2005 | Las tablas de multiplicar | Crab Producciones Musicales |
| 2006 | Al Cole con Miliki | Crab Producciones Musicales |
| 2009 | Miliki y los cantantes ayudantes | Crab Producciones Musicales |

==== Álbumes Recopilatorios ====
| Year | Title | Label |
| 2001 | Canta con Miliki | Crab Producciones Musicales |
| 2008 | A Mis Niños de 40 Años | Crab Producciones Musicales |
| 2009 | A todos mis niños | Crab Producciones Musicales |

==== External albums ====
| Year | Title | Label |
| 2001 | Miliki te cuenta cuentos | Crab Producciones Musicales |
| 2009 | Con alma de niño | Everest Editoriales |
| 2010 | Pequeño planeta Vol. 1 | Crab Producciones Musicales |

=== Other ===
- No se puede vivir con un franco, BSO of the film Pájaros de papel.

=== Collaborations ===
| Song | Singer |
|---|---|
| El profesor distraído | Carlitos Balá |
| La Cuba mía | Celia Cruz and Willy Chirino |
| Qué bien cocina mamá | Siempre Así |
| El ratón de Susanita | Fofito |

== Filmography ==
- 1948: El nieto del Zorro.
- 1955: Tres bárbaros en un jeep.
- 1972: Había una vez un circo.
- 1973: Los padrinos.
- 1982: Tompy, el conejito de trapo.
- 1999: Trilocos (TV series).
- 2002: Miliki presenta... Había una vez.
- 2002: La Cuba mía.
- 2003: El desván mágico de Miliki.
- 2005: 90 millas, as Pancho.
- 2008: Carlitos y el campo de los sueños, as Miliki.
- 2010: Pájaros de papel.

== Books ==
- 1996: Recuerdos.
- 2001: La máquina de los coches.
- 2003: Juan Olores.
- 2008: La Providencia.
- 2009: Con alma de niño.
- 2012: Mientras duermen los murciélagos.
