= Gabriel Aragón =

Spanish Clown, saxophonist

Gaby
- Born: Gabriel Aragón Bermúdez; 3 July 1920; Madrid, Spain
- Died: 10 January 1995 (aged 74); Madrid, Spain
- Occupations: Clown, singer

Gabriel Aragón Bermúdez, better known as Gaby (July 3, 1920 in Madrid – January 10, 1995 in Madrid) was a Spanish clown and saxophonist, member of the trio Gaby, Fofó and Miliki.

== Biography ==
Son of the clown Emilio Aragón Emig, he belonged to a family with a long tradition in the world of circus. He was nephew of the clown duo Pompoff and Thedy. He and his brother Alfonso Fofó, soon joined both their third brother, Emilio Miliki, who had begun his artistic career as a teenager during the Spanish Civil War, acting in places like the London Bar in Barcelona or in the Café Victoria in Madrid.

In 1946 he emigrated to America with his brothers, and there had success on TV shows, first in Cuba, starting in 1949. They lived in Puerto Rico from the mid-1960s to 1971, and from 1971 in Argentina.

In 1972 all three brothers came back to Spain and in 1973 released their show on Televisión Española El Gran Circo de TVE, that stayed on screen until 1983, garnering huge success.

When the TV show was cancelled, Miliki left the group and Gabriel Aragón continued acting with his nephews Fofito and Rody until 1985. Later he formed the clown group Los Gabytos with six of his ten children, and continued working between 1987 and 1993, a little more than one year before his death.

== Character ==
In the clown trio, Gaby played the role of the lead clown, in front of his brothers Fofó and Miliki (Augusto and Contraugusto respectively). He was always dressed with a black coat, and played the saxophone.

== Awards ==
Gabriel Aragón received, with his brothers, the Award TP de Oro in 1974 for The most popular character on TV and in 1995, the year of his death, the Award TP de Oro for his artistic career.
