= Enrique Carreras =

Peruvian-Argentine film director

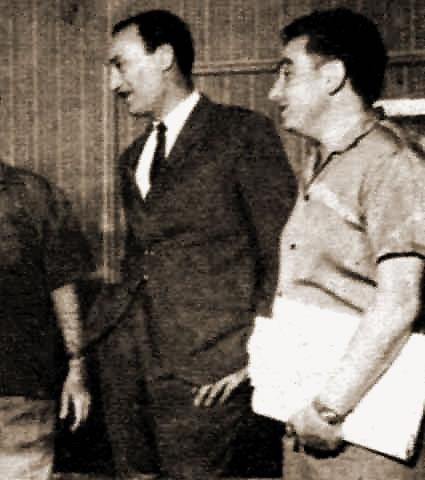
- Enrique Carreras (right)
- Born: 6 January 1925; Lima, Peru
- Died: 29 August 1995 (aged 70); Buenos Aires, Argentina
- Occupations: Film director, writer, actor, producer
- Years active: 1951–1991

Enrique Carreras (6 January 1925 – 29 August 1995) was a Peruvian-born Argentine film director, screenwriter and film producer. He was one of the most prolific film directors in the history of the cinema of Argentina and a prominent figure of the classical era of Argentine cinema.

== Biography ==
Born in Lima, Peru, Carreras directed nearly 100 films in his 40-year career between 1951 and 1991. His 1964 film The Escaped was seen at the 14th Berlin International Film Festival. His 1977 film Crazy Women was entered into the 10th Moscow International Film Festival.

He died in Buenos Aires in 1995.

== Filmography ==
- El mucamo de la niña (1951)
- Las zapatillas coloradas (1952)
- ¡Qué noche de casamiento! (1953)
- Suegra último modelo (1953)
- Los tres mosquiteros (1953)
- La tía de Carlitos (1953)
- La mano que aprieta (1953)
- Siete gritos en el mar (1954)
- Somos todos inquilinos (1954)
- Romeo y Julita (1954)
- Mi marido hoy duerme en casa (1955)
- Escuela de sirenas... y tiburones (1955)
- El fantasma de la opereta (1955)
- La cigüeña dijo ¡Sí! (1955)
- Ritmo, amor y picardía (1955)
- Luces de candilejas (1956)
- Música, alegría y amor (1956)
- Pecadora (1956)
- De noche también se duerme (1956)
- De Londres llegó un tutor (1958)
- El ángel de España (1958)
- El primer beso (1958)
- Angustias de un secreto (1959)
- Nubes de humo (1959)
- Obras maestras del terror (1960)
- Canción de arrabal (1961)
- Punto y banca o Patricia mía (1961)
- Tres alcobas (1962)
- El noveno mandamiento (1962)
- Los viciosos (1962)
- Hombres y mujeres de blanco (1962)
- Cuarenta años de novios (1963)
- El sexto sentido (1963)
- La mujer de tu prójimo (1963)
- La industria del matrimonio (1964)
- Ritmo nuevo, vieja ola (1964)
- Un viaje al más allá (1964)
- Los evadidos (1964)
- El Club del Clan (1964)
- Los hipócritas (1965)
- Fiebre de primavera (1965)
- Del brazo y por la calle (1966)
- De profesión sospechosos (1966)
- Mi primera novia (1966)
- El andador (1967)
- Ya tiene comisario el pueblo (1967)
- ¡Esto es alegría! (1967)
- ¿Quiere casarse conmigo? (1967)
- Operación San Antonio (1968)
- Matrimonio a la argentina (1968)
- Un muchacho como yo (1968)
- ¡Viva la vida! (1969)
- Corazón contento (1969)
- Los muchachos de antes no usaban gomina (1969)
- Amalio Reyes, un hombre (1970)
- Los muchachos de mi barrio (1970)
- Muchacho que vas cantando (1971)
- Aquellos años locos (1971)
- El veraneo de los Campanelli (1971)
- La valija (1971)
- Vamos a soñar con el amor (1971)
- La familia hippie (1971)
- Había una vez un circo (1972)
- El picnic de los Campanelli (1972)
- La sonrisa de mamá (1972)
- Hoy le toca a mi mujer (1973)
- Los padrinos (1973)
- Me gusta esa chica (1973)
- Yo tengo fe (1974)
- No hay que aflojarle a la vida (1975)
- Las procesadas (1975)
- La super, super aventura (1975)
- Los chicos crecen (1976)
- Así es la vida (1977)
- Las locas (1977)
- La mamá de la novia (1978)
- Los drogadictos (1979)
- Frutilla (1980)
- Sucedió en el fantástico Circo Tihany (1981)
- Ritmo, amor y primavera (1981)
- Los fierecillos indomables (1982)
- Los extraterrestres (1983)
- Los fierecillos se divierten (1983)
- Sálvese quien pueda (1984)
- Los reyes del sablazo (1984)
- Las barras bravas (1985)
- Mingo y Aníbal contra los fantasmas (1985)
- Miráme la palomita (1985)
- Mingo y Aníbal en la mansión embrujada (1986)
- Rambito y Rambón, primera misión (1986)
- Los colimbas se divierten (1986)
- Galería del terror (1987)
- Los colimbas al ataque (1987)
- El profesor punk (1988)
- Atracción peculiar (1988)
- Delito de corrupción (1991)

Productor

- Bólidos de acero (1950)
- La niña de fuego (1952)
- El protegido (1956)
