= Mercedes Carreras =

Argentine actress

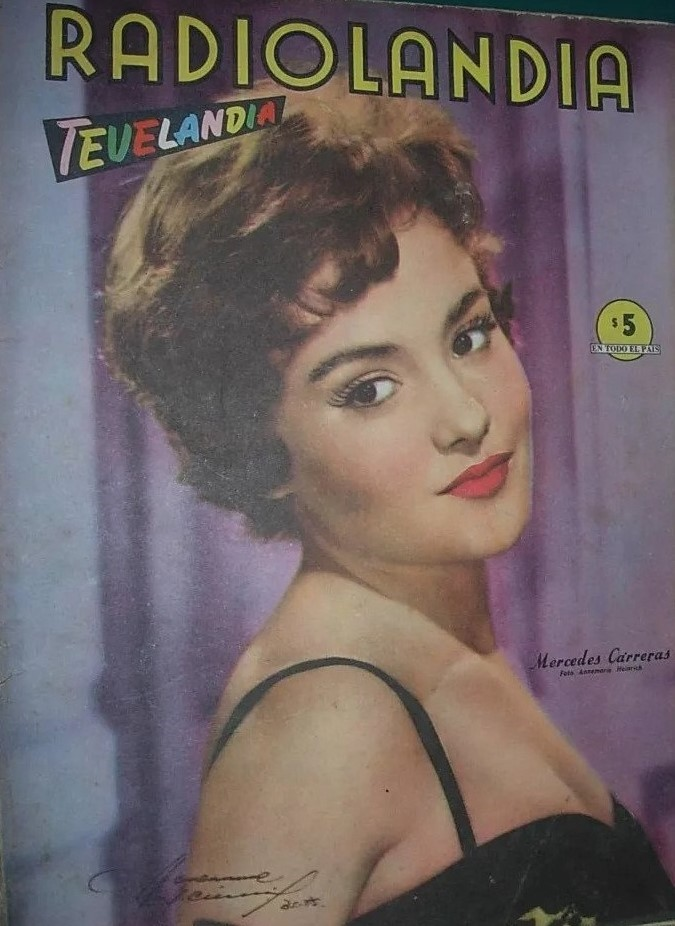
- Carerras on a magazine cover in 1959
- Born: 22 September 1940 (age 85); Buenos Aires, Argentina
- Occupation: Actress
- Years active: 1957-present

Mercedes Carreras (born 22 September 1940) is an Argentine actress. She has appeared in thirty films and television shows since 1957. She won the award for Best Actress for her role in Crazy Women at the 10th Moscow International Film Festival.

== Filmography ==
- Aquellos años locos (1971)
- Había una vez un circo (1972) as Aurelia
- Los Padrinos (1973)
- Crazy Women (1977)
- Los Drogadictos (1979)
