= Tito Ribero =

Argentine film score composer, composer, singer and musician

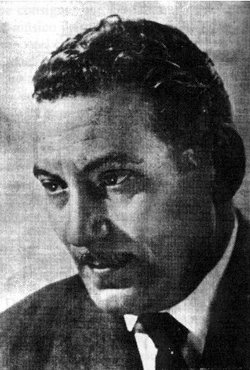
Tito Ribero

Alberto Amado Ribero, known professionally as Tito Ribero, (16 May 1915 – 18 July 1964) was an Argentine film score composer, composer, singer, and musician. In addition to having his own orchestra, he provided the film scores to over 200 movies, at his most prolific in the 1950s and 1960s. For Del otro lado del puente he won the Silver Condor Award for Best Original Score from the Argentine Academy of Cinematography Arts and Sciences in 1953.

== Filmography ==
- La frontera olvidada (1996)
- Gran valor (1980)
- Frutilla (1980)
- Diablo metió la pata (1980)
- Los Drogadictos (1979)
- Donde duermen dos…duermen tres (1979)
- No apto para menores (1979)
- Yo también tengo fiaca (1978)
- Así es la vida (1977)
- Las locas (1977)
- Los muchachos de antes no usaban arsénico (1976)
- Te necesito tanto, amor (1976)
- Los chicos crecen (1976)
- Los chiflados dan el golpe (1975)
- No hay que aflojarle a la vida (1975)
- Las procesadas (1975)
- Los chantas (1975)
- Los chiflados del batallón (1975)
- El inquisidorr (1975)
- Yo tengo fe (1974)
- Papá Corazón se quiere casar (1974)
- La flor de la mafia (1974)
- Andrea (1973)
- Hoy le toca a mi mujer (1973)
- Los padrinos (1973)
- Adiós, Alejandra, Andrea (1973)
- Me gusta esa chica (1973)
- Había una vez un circo (1972)
- Las píldoras (1972)
- El picnic de los Campanelli (1972)
- Simplemente María (1972)
- Nino (1972)
- Mi amigo Luis (1972)
- La sonrisa de mamá (1972)
- Pájaro loco (1971)
- Muchacho que vas cantando (1971)
- Balada para un mochilero (1971)
- Aquellos años locos (1971)
- La valija (1971)
- Vamos a soñar por el amor (1971)
- La familia hippie (1971)
- Joven, viuda y estanciera (1970)
- Pimienta y pimentón (1970)
- Amalio Reyes, un hombre (1970)
- Los muchachos de mi barrio (1970)
- Cautiva en la selva (1969)
- ¡Viva la vida! (1969)
- Los debutantes en el amor (1969)
- Flor de piolas (1969)
- El día que me quieras (1969)
- Somos novios (1969)
- Los muchachos de antes no usaban gomina (1969)
- La ciudad de los cuervos (1969)
- Maternidad sin hombres (1968)
- El novicio rebelde (1968)
- El Derecho a la felicidad (1968)
- Este cura (1968)
- Destino para dos (1968)
- Matrimonio a la argentina (1968)
- Un muchacho como yo (1968)
- Coche cama alojamiento (1968)
- El andador (1967)
- Ya tiene comisario el pueblo (1967)
- ¡Al diablo con este cura! (1967)
- ¡Esto es alegría! (1967)
- Quiere casarse conmigo …?! (1967)
- Tacuara y Chamorro, pichones de hombres (1967)
- Del brazo con la muerte (1966)
- Del brazo y por la calle (1966)
- Pimienta (1966)
- De profesión, sospechosos (1966)
- La gorda (1966)
- La mujer de tu prójimo (1966)
- Vivir es formidable (1966)
- Psique y sexo (1965)
- Ritmo nuevo y vieja ola (1965)
- Los hipócritas (1965)
- Bicho raro (1965)
- Canuto Cañete, detective privado (1965)
- Esquiú, una luz en el sendero (1965)
- Esta noche mejor no (1965)
- Nadie oyó gritar a Cecilio Fuentes (1965)
- Viaje de una noche de verano (1965)
- Cuidado con las colas (1964)
- Canuto Cañete y los 40 ladrones (1964)
- Aconcagua (rescate heroico) (1964)
- La sentencia (1964)
- Los evadidos (1964)
- Il vuoto o Un momento muy largo 1964)
- Tres alcobas (1964)
- Un Viaje al más allá (1964)
- Canuto Cañete, conscripto del 7 (1963)
- La calesita (1963)
- 40 años de novios (1963)
- Alias Flequillo (1963)
- Lindor Covas, el cimarrón (1963)
- Barcos de papel (1963)
- Rata de puerto (1963)
- El mago de las finanzas (1962)
- Delito (1962)
- Hombre de la esquina rosada (1962)
- Propiedad (1962)
- El bruto o (1962)
- Cristóbal Colón en la Facultad de Medicina (1962)
- Misión 52 (1962)
- Operación G (1962)
- Mi Buenos Aires querido (1961)
- El romance de un gaucho (1961)
- Esta tierra es mía (1961)
- Rebelde con causa (1961)
- El centroforward murió al amanecer (1961)
- La maestra enamorada (1961)
- Interpol llamando a Río (1961)
- Creo en ti (1960)
- Culpable (1960)
- Yo quiero vivir contigo o La gran aventura (1960)
- Dos tipos con suerte (1960)
- Luna Park (1960)
- Todo el año es Navidad (1960)
- Gringalet (1959)
- Las tierras blancas (1959)
- Amor se dice cantando (1959)
- Campo virgen (1959)
- La vertiente (1959)
- Del cuplé al tango (1959)
- Campo arado (1959)
- Una cita con la vida (1958)
- Demasiado jóvenes (1958)
- Rosaura a las 10 (1958)
- La morocha (1958)
- Amor prohibido (1958)
- Dos basuras (1958)
- Isla brava (1958)
- Las apariencias engañan (1958)
- Un centavo de mujer (1958)
- Cinco gallinas y el cielo (1957)
- La muerte en las calles (1957)
- Beyond Oblivion (1956)
- El protegido (1956)
- África ríe (1956)
- La pícara soñadora (1956)
- Edad difícil (1956)
- Amor a primera vista (1956)
- El amor nunca muere (1955)
- Para vestir santos (1955)
- La Quintrala (1955)
- El barro humano (1955)
- El hombre que debía una muerte (1955)
- Más pobre que una laucha (1955)
- Ayer fue primavera (1955)
- El millonario (1955)
- La mujer desnuda (1955)
- Mi marido y mi novio (1955)
- Pobre pero honrado (1955)
- Vida nocturna (1955)
- Barrio gris (1954)
- Desalmados en pena (1954)
- Veraneo en Mar del Plata (1954)
- Caídos en el infierno (1954)
- El grito sagrado (1954)
- Mujeres casadas (1954)
- La calle del pecado (1954)
- Los problemas de papá (1954)
- Casada y señorita (1954)
- La telaraña (1954)
- Un hombre cualquiera (1954)
- Una Ventana a la vida (1953)
- The Lady of the Camellias (1953)
- Trompada 45 (1953)
- Del otro lado del puente (1953)
- Dock Sud (1953)
- La niña del gato (1953)
- Uéi Paesano (1953)
- Vigilantes y ladrones (1952)
- El infierno verde o Las aguas bajan turbias (1952)
- La patrulla chiflada (1952)
- Mala gente (1952)
- Paraíso robado (1952)
- Bárbara atómica (1952)
- Donde comienzan los pantanos (1952)
- El baldío (1952)
- El infortunado Fortunato (1952)
- Ellos nos hicieron así (1952)
- Mi mujer está loca (1952)
- Pasó en mi barrio (1951)
- La última escuadrilla (1951)
- The Beautiful Brummel (1951)
- Fantasmas asustados (1951)
- To Live for a Moment (1951)
- Buenos Aires, mi tierra querida (1951)
- Llévame contigo (1951)
- Camino al crimen (1951)
- Surcos de sangre (1950)
- El último payador (1950)
- La barra de la esquina (1950)
- Romance en tres noches (1950)
- Historia del 900 (1949)
- Adiós Pampa mía (1946)
- Pasión imposible (1943)
- Gente bien (1939)

Musical Director

- La Mamá de la novia (1978)
- Vamos a soñar por el amor (1971)
- Maternidad sin hombres (1968)
- El novicio rebelde (1968)
- El Derecho a la felicidad (1968)
- Destino para dos (1968)
- Un muchacho como yo (1968)
- Coche cama alojamiento (1968)
- El andador (1967)
- Ya tiene comisario el pueblo (1967)
- ¡Al diablo con este cura! (1967)
- ¡Esto es alegría! (1967)
- Tacuara y Chamorro, pichones de hombres (1967)
- Quiere casarse conmigo …?! (1967)
- Tres alcobas (1964)
- La murga (1963)
- Las abejas (1951)
