= List of Argentine films of 1951 =

A list of films produced in Argentina in 1951:

Argentine films of 1951
Title	Director	Release	Genre
A - C
El alma de los niños	Carlos Borcosque	6 December	
Alma liberada	Edmundo del Solar	9 August	
Los árboles mueren de pie	Carlos Schlieper	9 July	
Buenos Aires, mi tierra querida	Julio Saraceni	2 May	
Café cantante	Antonio Momplet	5 July	
La calle junto a la luna	Román Viñoly Barreto	25 October	
Cartas de amor	Mario C. Lugones	25 January	
La comedyinmortal	Catrano Catrani	9 February	
El complejo de Felipe	Juan Carlos Thorry	20 April	
Concierto de bastón	Enrique Cahen Salaberry	13 March	
Con la música en el alma	Luis Bayón Herrera	10 January	
Cosas de mujer	Carlos Schlieper	6 July	comedy
A Cuban in Spain	Luis Bayón Herrera	1 September	
Cuidado con las mujeres	Enrique Cahen Salaberry	25 September	
D - H
Derecho viejo	Manuel Romero	4 January	
De turno con la muerte	Julio Porter	22 November	
Escándalo nocturno	Juan Carlos Thorry	22 May	
Especialista en señoras	Enrique Cahen Salaberry	29 September	comedy
El extraño caso del hombre y la bestia	Mario Soffici	11 January	Horror thriller
Fantasmas asustados	Carlos Rinaldi	16 May	
El hermoso Brummel	Julio Saraceni	26 June	
El heroico Bonifacio	Enrique Cahen Salaberry	22 February	
El hincha	Manuel Romero	13 April	
The Honourable Tenant	Carlos Schlieper	20 December	
I - M
Los isleros	Lucas Demare	20 March	Drama
Llévame contigo	Juan Sires	20 April	
Locuras, tiros y mambos	Leo Fleider	18 October	Musical comedy
Martín Pescador	Antonio Ber Ciani	19 January	
Me casé con una estrella	Luis César Amadori	4 October	
Mi divina pobreza	Alberto D'Aversa	12 June	
Mi vida por la tuya	Roberto Gavaldón	1 February	
El mucamo de la niña	Enrique Carreras and Juan Sires	24 October	Musical comedy
La mujer del león	Mario C. Lugones	5 September	
Mujeres en sombra	Catrano Catrani	25 September	
N - R
El Negro que tenía el alma blanca	Hugo del Carril	28 May	Musical
La orquídea	Ernesto Arancibia	20 July	
Pasó en mi barrio	Mario Soffici	20 December	Drama
The Path to Crime	Don Napy	22 March	
El patio de la morocha	Manuel Romero	14 August	
Patrulla Norte	Enio Echenique	14 June	
El pendiente	León Klimovsky	10 August	thriller
La pícara cenicienta	Francisco Mugica	14 August	
Pocholo, Pichuca y yo	Fernando Bolín	6 July	
¡Qué tiempos aquéllos!			Anthology film
Rhythm, Salt and Pepper	Carlos Torres Ríos	7 February	Musical comedy
S - Z
Sangre negra	Pierre Chenal	2 March	
Sombras en la frontera	Leo Fleider	28 August	
Soñemos	Luis César Amadori		Documentary
Suburb	León Klimovsky	16 March	
Tierra extraña	Carlos Torres Ríos	27 July	
To Live for a Moment	Tulio Demicheli	3 May	
La última escuadrilla	Julio Saraceni	23 October	
The Unwanted	Mario Soffici	18 May	Drama
Una noche cualquiera	Luis Mottura	21 June	
La vida color de rosa	León Klimovsky	21 February	
La vida de una mujer	Facundo J. Martínez	15 March	
Volver a la vida	Carlos Borcosque	12 January	

== External links and references ==
- Argentine films of 1951 at the Internet Movie Database
