= List of Argentine films of 1971 =

A list of films produced in Argentina in 1971:

Argentine films of 1971
Title	Director	Release	Genre
A - B
Argentino hasta la muerte	Fernando Ayala	6 May	
Aquellos años locos	Enrique Carreras	30 July	
¡Arriba juventud!	Leo Fleider	4 March	musical
Así es Buenos Aires	Emilio Vieyra	6 May	
El ayudante	Mario David	25 March	drama
Bajo el signo de la patria	René Mugica	20 May	History
Balada para un mochilero	Carlos Rinaldi	5 August	
La bestia desnuda	Emilio Vieyra	25 March	
Los buenos sentimientos	Bernardo Borenholtz	13 January	
La buscona	Emilio Gómez Muriel	25 May	
C - G
El caradura y la millonaria	Enrique Cahen Salaberry	4 March	
Crónica de una señora	Raúl de la Torre	29 July	drama
David Amitin	La visita	13 January	
El destino	Juan Batlle Planas (h)	30 September	
El diablo sin dama	Eduardo Calcagno	13 January	
Embrujo de amor	Leo Fleider	8 July	
En una playa junto al mar	Enrique Cahen Salaberry	4 February	
La Familia hippie	Enrique Carreras	25 March	comedy
Fuego	Armando Bó	23 September	
La gran ruta	Fernando Ayala	7 October	
Güemes: la tierra en armas	Leopoldo Torre Nilsson	7 April	History
H - S
El habilitado	Jorge Cedrón	17 March	
Un Hombre extraño	Alberto Rinaldi	7 June	Thriller
Juguemos en el mundo	María Herminia Avellaneda	19 August	
México, la revolución congelada	Raymundo Gleyzer	12 - 27 May	
El milagro de Ceferino Namuncurá	Máximo Berrondo	17 June	
Muchacho que vas cantando	Enrique Carreras	12 August	musical
Los neuróticos	Héctor Olivera	18 March	
Nosotros los monos	Edmund Valladares	28 October	
Pájaro loco	Lucas Demare	9 September	
Paula contra la mitad más uno	Néstor Paternostro	11 February	
Santos Vega	Carlos Borcosque (hijo)	22 July	
Siempre te amaré	Leo Fleider	1 April	
Simplemente una rosa	Emilio Vieyra	2 September	
T - Z
Un guapo del 900	Lautaro Murúa	30 September	drama
La valija	Enrique Carreras	3 June	
Vamos a soñar por el amor	Enrique Carreras	22 April	
La venganza del sexo	Emilio Vieyra	19 March	
El Veraneo de los Campanelli	Enrique Carreras	1 July	comedy
Vida, pasión y muerte de un realizador iracundo	Rodolfo Corral	13 January	
Vuelvo a vivir... vuelvo a cantar	Julio Saraceni	7 October	
Y que patatín... y que patatán	Mario Sábato	30 September	

== External links and references ==
- Argentine films of 1971 at the Internet Movie Database
