= Enrique Dumas =

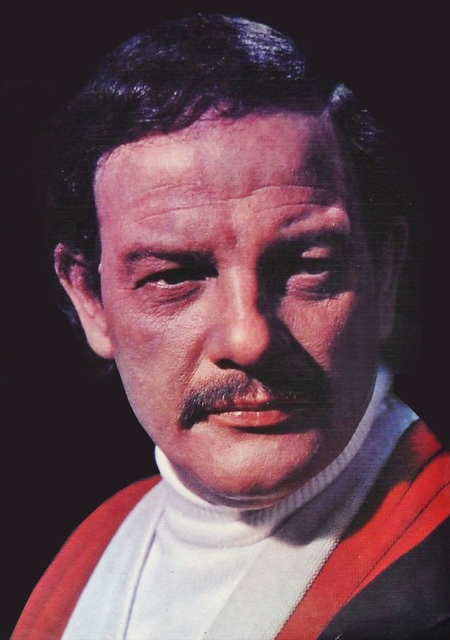
- Enrique Dumas

Background information
- Also known as: Quique
- Born: Enrique Rodríguez Acha; 8 May 1935; La Plata, Buenos Aires, Argentina
- Origin: Argentina
- Died: 18 January 2009 (aged 73) Jesús María, Córdoba, Argentina
- Genre: Tango
- Occupation: Singer
- Instrument: Voice
- Spouse: Nélida Teresa Colomba

Enrique Rodríguez Acha (8 May 1935 – 18 January 2009), better known by his stage name Enrique Dumas, was an Argentine tango singer.

== Life ==
At the age of 14, he began his artistic career singing jazz in the Dixieland orchestra under the pseudonym Hugo Randall, and in April 1955 he made his debut on Radio Splendid with the tango orchestra of Carlos Figari.

He remained connected to this group for several years, performing on various stages and recording his first albums for the "Music Hall" label. In the early 1960s, he became a solo artist and married radio and television host Nélida Teresa Colomba. The couple had three children and eventually separated.

He appeared in various programs on Argentine television. Among them were Esquina de Tango with Carlos Figari (Channel 7, 1958), La Familia Gesa alongside Virginia Luque (Channel 7, 1958 to 1960), El show de Antonio Prieto (Channel 13, 1963), Yo te canto, Buenos Aires (Channel 11), Grandes valores del tango hosted by Silvio Soldán (Channel 9), and La Botica del Ángel hosted by Eduardo Bergara Leumann (Channel 11, 1982 to 1988). He also appeared on Uruguayan television in programs such as Las noches del mercado, Galas de tango, Montevideo tango, and Ciudad de tango.

He also performed in theater, making his debut in Aquí está la vieja ola y esta vez no viene sola alongside Olinda Bozán and Alberto Anchart. He also took part in the revival of the play La muchacha del centro by Francisco Canaro, with José Marrone, and in Buenos Aires de seda y percal, with Mariano Mores, Susy Leiva, Néstor Fabián, and Mirtha Legrand, at the Teatro Coliseo. At the Teatro General San Martín, he portrayed Santos Vega in La guitarra del Diablo. Other plays he participated in included El conventillo de la Paloma with Pepita Muñoz and Marcos Caplán; Aplausos with Libertad Lamarque and Juan Carlos Thorry; Tangos en El Dante with Aníbal Troilo and Tito Lusiardo; Yo canto a mi Argentina with Mariano Mores, Tito Lusiardo, and Héctor Gagliardi; and Buenos Aires, todo tango with Beba Bidart, Horacio Salgán, and Ubaldo de Lío.

He acted in the films Viaje de una noche de verano (1965), alongside Néstor Fabián and Japanese singers Ikuo Abo and Ranko Fujisawa; Bicho raro (1965); and Flor de piolas (1967; released in 1969).

In 2003, he traveled to Japan as a guest artist with the orchestra of bandoneonist Carlos Galván, and in June 2005 he was involved in a serious car accident. In his later years, he performed as a guest at concerts and local festivals.

His final performance was on Friday, 16 January 2009 (early Saturday morning) at "La noche del tango," as part of the "Festival de Doma y Folklore de Jesús María" in Córdoba. Enrique Dumas died of a massive heart attack around midday on Sunday, 18 January 2009.

== Discography (partial) ==
- Así es el tango (1965; with the orchestra of Roberto Pansera; Polydor)
- 14 con el tango (1966; produced by Ben Molar, in which Dumas performs two songs: “Bailate un tango Ricardo” and “En qué esquina te encuentro Buenos Aires”)
- Cafetín de Buenos Aires (with the orchestra of Alberto Di Paulo; Magenta)
- Dumas canta Mores (1976; Polydor)
- El porteñísimo (Polydor)
- Historiando tangos (with the orchestra of Roberto Pansera; Polydor)
- El que canta es mi papá (Polydor)
- Alma de bohemio (with the Sexteto Mayor; Diapasón)
- De rompe y raje (with the orchestra of Osvaldo Requena; Microfón)
- El firulete (with the orchestra of Alberto Di Paulo; Magenta)
- Tangos con sus grandes valores (with the orchestra of Luis Stazo; Diapasón)
- Pa' Que Bailen Los Muchachos (1987 SONDOR – Uruguay)

== Theatre ==
- Aquí está la vieja ola!... Y esta vez no viene sola (1950), with the Comic Entertainment Company led by Olinda Bozán and Alberto Anchart. Premiered at the Teatro Astral.
