= Thelma del Río =

Argentine actress and vedette

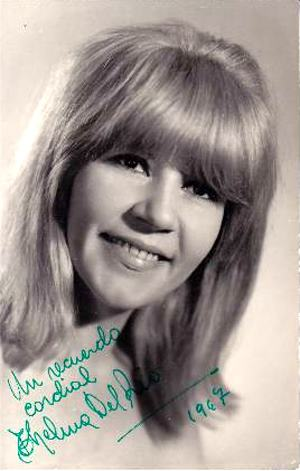
Thelma del Río

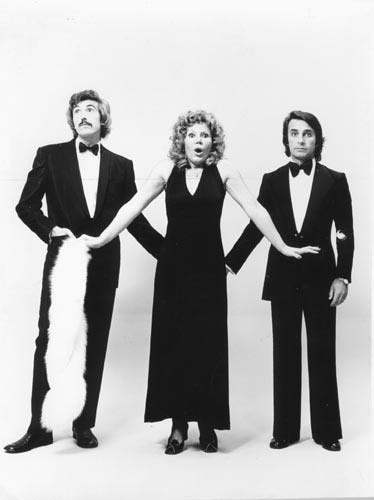
Rolo Puente, Thelma del Río and Santiago Bal in Tocata y fuga de Bal (1974)

Thelma Alicia Parapar (8 March 1926 – 23 September 1998), known by her stage name Thelma del Río, was an Argentine film, stage and television actress, as well as a vedette.

Thelma Alicia Parapar was born in Buenos Aires. She worked in the theatre with Carlos A. Petit, Adolfo Stray and Nelida Roca. She died from breast cancer in Buenos Aires in 1998 and was buried in La Chacarita Cemetery.

== Filmography ==
- 1956: Estrellas de Buenos Aires
- 1958: Las Apariencias engañan
- 1960: El asalto
- 1968: Asalto a la ciudad
- 1972: Las píldoras
- 1979: La carpa del amor
- 1988: Paraíso relax

=== Television ===
- 1952: Telesolfas musicales
- 1953: El hombre de aquella noche
- 1965: Teleteatro en Canal 7
- 1965: La matraca
- 1965: Todo es amor
- 1981: Comedias para vivir
- 1982: La comedia del domingo
- 1982: Gracias doctor
- 1984: Historias de un trepador
- 1986: Claudia Morán
- 1989/1995: La familia Benvenuto
- 1990: La pensión de la Porota
- 1991: Regalo del cielo
- 1998: Rapidísimo
