= Locuras, tiros y mambos =

- Directed by: Leo Fleider
- Written by: Carlos A. Petit
- Starring: Rafael Carret, Jorge Luz, Zelmar Gueñol
- Cinematography: Ricardo Younis
- Edited by: José Serra
- Music by: Silvio Vernazza
- Distributed by: Jorge Luz, Juan Carlos Cambon, Carret Duck, Zelmar Gueñol, Guillermo Rico, Blanquita Amaro, Juan Verdaguer, Carlos Bianquet, Vicente Forastieri, Margaret Padin
- Release date: 1951
- Running time: 74 minute
- Country: Argentina
- Language: Spanish

Locuras, tiros y mambos is a 1951 film of the classical era of Argentine cinema. The director is Leo Fleider, and the writer is Carlos A. Petit. Music by Silvio Vernazza, and cinematography is by Ricardo Younis. This movie starred Rafael Carret, Jorge Luz, and Zelmar Gueñol.

== Plot ==
The 'Big 5 of Good Humor' live in a theater that is about to be demolished. They try to convince the owner not to, and they learn that a gang of criminals dedicated to clandestine gambling operates in the theater.

== Cast ==
- Rafael Carret was born on September 10, 1923, in Argentina. He is known for acting in Locuras, tiros y mambos (1951), Melodies of America (1942) and The Day You Love Me (1969).
- Jorge Luz was born on May 8, 1922, in Provincia de Buenos Aires, Argentina and his full name was Jorge Da Lus Borbon. He is known for acting in Locuras, tiros y mambos (1951), Delito de corrupción (1991) and Autumn Sun (1996). He died in July 14, 2012, in Balvanera, Buenos Aires City, Argentina.
- Juan Carlos Cambón was born on January 24, 1912. He was an actor, known for Locuras, tiros y mambos (1951), Trompada 45 (1953) and Cinco locos en la pista (1950). He died in 1955
- Blanquita Amaro was born on June 30, 1923, in San Antonio de los Baños, Cuba. She was an actress, known for Bésame mucho (1945), Bella, la salvaje (1953) and Rincón criollo (1950). She died on March 15, 2007, in Miami, Florida, USA.
- Juan Verdaguer was born on July 30, 1915, in Montevideo, Uruguay as Juan Francisco Verdaguer. He was an actor, known for Rosaura a las 10 (1958), Locuras, tiros y mambos (1951) and La Herencia (1964). He died on May 14, 2001, in Buenos Aires, Argentina.
- Margarita Padín was born on July 8, 1910, in Chacabuco, Buenos Aires, Argentina. She was an actress, known for Dancing (1933), Picaflor (1935) and Locuras, tiros y mambos (1951). She died on August 13, 1993, in Buenos Aires.
