= Botica del Ángel =

Coordinates: 34°36′54″S 58°23′15″W

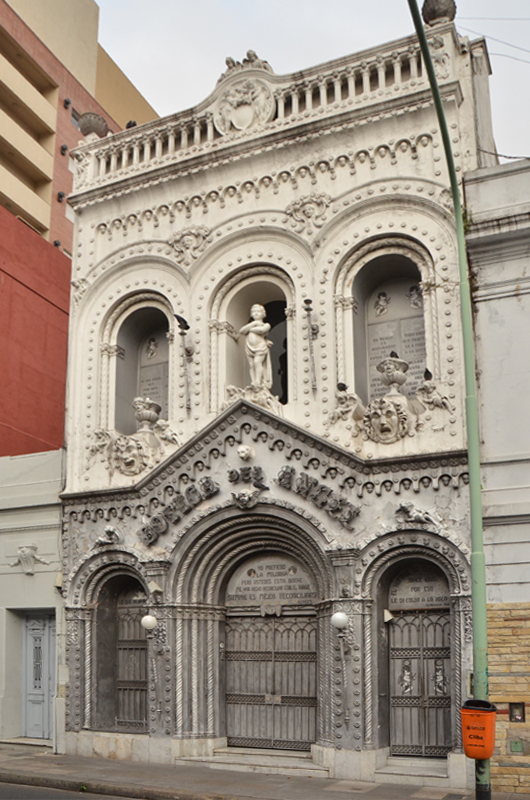
The ornate façade of the Botica del Ángel of Montserrat.

Botica del Ángel is a museum in Buenos Aires, Argentina. It was originally an artistic venue created by the animator, painter, set designer, actor, and costume designer Eduardo Bergara Leumann in the Monserrat neighborhood of Buenos Aires, Argentina, in 1966. It became a space where many prominent figures of the Argentine artistic scene, both nationally and internationally recognized, got their start or passed through.

== History ==
It was founded in 1966 as an alternative theater and exhibition space through the initiative of its creator and promoter, Eduardo Bergara Leumann, in a theatrical tailor shop at 670 Lima Street. It quickly established itself as an avant-garde alternative center, emerging alongside the Di Tella Institute.

The venue featured imagery and memorabilia, including items related to Jorge Luis Borges, Alfonsina Storni, Alejandra Pizarnik, Silvia and Mirtha Legrand, Eva Perón, Zully Moreno, Victoria Ocampo, José Gobello, and others. There are also works by great Argentine artists such as Antonio Berni, Josefina Robirosa, Guillermo Roux, Raúl Soldi, Edgardo Giménez, among others. The repertoire of its host and owner welcomed the musical debuts of figures like Pepe Cibrián Campoy, Susana Rinaldi, Nacha Guevara, Marikena Monti, Valeria Lynch, Horacio Molina, Marilina Ross, Cuarteto Zupay, and Leonardo Favio, along with the appearances or comebacks of figures in Argentine cultural and artistic life such as Libertad Lamarque, Niní Marshall, Alberto Castillo, Luisa Vehil, Manuel Mujica Lainez, Mecha Ortiz, and Tania. The atmosphere resembled that of a café-concert, and audiences often participated directly in performances and happenings organized by Eduardo Bergara Leumann.

According to theater critic Emilio Stevanovich, its characteristics around 1966 were:

"La Botica was a fun, cultural show—but above all, it was free and surprising. There were no premieres, so there was no stage fright for first-timers. When the audience arrived, they were greeted and seated by the performers themselves, creating a mutual sense of ease for what would become the 'theatrical adventure' of the Botica. Upon entering, spectators were given a pitcher of wine, little biscuits, and a basin for personal hygiene. Bergara would open women’s handbags as a way to spark conversation or create a gag, since at the Botica there was no script or routine—everything flowed from the Angel, created in the moment of encounter. The show changed without notice. The audience returned again and again, bringing friends to enjoy the transformation through participation. Many nights, it was unclear whether to ask for autographs on the stage or in the audience. There was no grand finale. As the audience—almost all of whom had participated in the performance—left, the cast stood in two lines and bid them farewell personally. The most rigid and reserved spectators, who had ended up dancing or acting, were the most grateful as they left—they had felt free and like protagonists for the night."

— Emilio Stevanovich

La Botica del Ángel was also a television series for years on Channel 7. The show had a second run in the 1980s under the name La Botica del Tango on Channel 11.

The first Botica closed its doors due to the widening works on Avenida 9 de Julio, making way in 1969 for a second, larger venue—Templo del Ángel—located at 541 Luis Sáenz Peña Street, in an abandoned church that Bergara Leumann redecorated with paintings, objects, and various themed settings to turn it into his home, and later into a museum.

According to Bergara Leumann:

"I wanted to create a model theatrical tailor shop because I dreamed of dressing, bringing color, harmony, setting, enhancing, and adorning the inner life of each character with a good costume. It was at 670 Lima Street; that was the first Botica del Ángel, which Avenida 9 de Julio took away in the name of progress. But since the foundations were strong, it was possible for the angels to take flight, along with the talent of those who passed through and found their path to the stars; and I landed in this angelic church with all my memories. Upon seeing them after 47 years of work, I decided it was time to turn it into a living and joyful museum. I’ve always known that we only carry with us what we leave to others, and only what is not remembered truly dies. So, on May 5, 1997, I brought the Botica back with my angels. So that tango, folklore, and everything else can continue within it, just like in a traditional apothecary. Because every angel who practices ends up at the Botica, and there is no angel that doesn’t come for a good reason."

— Eduardo Bergara Leumann

La Botica del Ángel is part of the cultural landmarks of the city of Buenos Aires. It features 33 rooms with various themed settings. Through a bequest in his will, it was left to the Universidad del Salvador with the condition that it remain open to the public. Guided tours are available.
