= Pasión dominguera =

- Directed by: Emilio Ariño
- Written by: Gustavo Ghirardi
- Cinematography: Humberto Peruzzi
- Edited by: Atilio Rinaldi
- Music by: Héctor Stamponi
- Release date: 1970
- Running time: 70 minute
- Country: Argentina
- Language: Spanish

Pasión dominguera is a 1970 Argentine film.

== Cast ==
Jorge Porcel, Luis Tasca, Fidel Pintos, Nathán Pinzón, Perla Caron, Federico Luppi, Beto Gianola, Néstor Fabián, Juan Carlos de Seta, Gloria Leyland, Beatriz Bonnet, Manuel de Sabattini, Vicente Ariño, Roberto Galán, Héctor Sturman, Ramón "Palito" Ortega, Fernando Iglesias “Tacholas”, Jorge Salcedo, Marty Cosens, Oscar “Ringo” Bonavena.
