= Carlos A. Petit =

Argentine screenwriter

Carlos A. Petit (2 February 1913 – 18 March 1993) was an Argentine screenwriter. He was one of the most prominent screenwriters in the Cinema of Argentina, writing for over 30 films between 1941 and 1984.

He wrote for acclaimed films such as Alma de bohemio (1949), A La Habana me voy and Con la música en el alma. (1951) and Las Apariencias engañan (1958)

== Filmography ==
- Las Mil y una de Sapag (1984) TV Series (writer)
- El Gran Marrone (1974) TV Series (writer)
- Los Muchachos de mi barrio (1970)
- El Gordo Villanueva (1964)
- El que con niños se acuesta (1959)
- Las Apariencias engañan (1958)
- Que me toquen las golondrinas (1957)
- Estrellas de Buenos Aires (1956)
- Cuando los duendes cazan perdices (1955)
- El Millonario (1955)
- Pobre pero honrado (1955)
- Vida nocturna (1955)
- Casada y señorita (1954)
- La casa grande (1953)
- Los Sobrinos del Zorro (1952)
- Ésta es mi vida (1952)
- Locuras, tiros y mambos (1951)
- A Cuban in Spain (1951) (story)
- Buenos Aires, mi tierra querida (1951)
- La Vida color de rosa (1951)
- Con la música en el alma (1951)
- A La Habana me voy (1951)
- La Mujer del león (1951)
- Buenos Aires a la vista (1950)
- La Barra de la esquina (1950)
- Piantadino (1950)
- El Seductor (1950)
- El Zorro pierde el pelo (1950)
- Alma de bohemio (1949)
- Un Nuevo amanecer (1942)
- Cada hogar un mundo (1942)
- Yo conocí a esa mujer (1941)

== On TV ==
- 2026: Petit was impersonated by Luis Machín in Moria
