= El Asalto =

1960 film

- Directed by: Kurt Land
- Written by: Enrique Silberstein; Ariel Cortazzo
- Produced by: Jaime Cabouli; Emilio Spitz
- Starring: Alberto de Mendoza
- Cinematography: Alfredo Traverso
- Edited by: Gerardo Rinaldi; Antonio Ripoll
- Music by: Víctor Buchino
- Distributed by: Guaranteed Pictures
- Release date: 1960
- Running time: 90 minute
- Country: Argentina
- Language: Spanish

El Asalto ("The Robbery") is a 1960 Argentine black-and-white film crime drama film directed and by Kurt Land. The film was based on a book by Enrique Silberstein and premiered in Buenos Aires. It starred Alberto de Mendoza.

== Plot ==
A group of mobsters plan a bank heist. But the rehearsal of the robbery is plenty of personal drama, disputes and almost farcical mishaps.

== Main cast ==
- Alberto de Mendoza...The Boss
- Egle Martin
- Luis Tasca
- Tato Bores
- Osvaldo Terranova
- Thelma del Río
- Argentino Ledesma
- Mario Lozano
- Héctor Méndez
- Irma Gabriel

== Other cast ==
- Osvaldo María Cabrera
- Víctor Catalano
- José De Angelis .... Superintendent Oliva
- Conrado Diana
- Ángel Díaz
- Rolando Dumas .... Francisco Coba
- Mariquita Gallegos .... Woman in disco
- Claudia Lapacó .... Woman in disco
- René Lester
- Pablo Moret
- Miguel Paparelli .... The Usher
- Gilberto Peyret .... Sanz
- María Esther Rodrigo
- Carlos Roig
- Félix Tortorelli .... The Cashier
