= Eduardo Bergara Leumann =

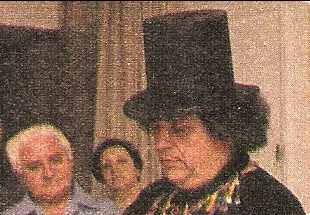
- Eduardo Bergara Leumann in 1983.
- Born: Eduardo Gustavo Bergara Leumann; September 5, 1932; Argentina, Buenos Aires
- Died: September 5, 2008 (aged 76); Argentina, Buenos Aires
- Burial place: Cementerio de la Chacarita
- Other names: "El Gordo" Bergara Leumann; Bergara Leumann

Eduardo Gustavo Bergara Leumann, also known simply as Bergara Leumann (Buenos Aires, September 5, 1932 – Buenos Aires, September 5, 2008), was a television host, costume designer, actor, and visual artist from Argentina, regarded as one of the pioneering figures of the café concert in his country. He was also the creator of the famous artistic space known as "Botica del Ángel."

== Life ==
Starting in the 1950s in theater as a director and actor in the play Pregón Federal, he began working as a costume designer for several films such as La Cueva de Alí Babá and Ensayo Final. In 1958, he joined Mecha Ortiz's company in the play La Hechicera de Corinto at the Sarmiento Theater. He also acted in Don Juan Tenorio (with María Vaner and José María Vilches) and Buenas noches, Carina (with Ana María Campoy and José Cibrián), where he was both a costume designer and an actor.

=== Film ===
He worked extensively in cinema during the 1960s and 1970s. In Europe, he participated in Animal (with Jean-Paul Belmondo and Raquel Welch), and in that continent, he worked with figures such as Louis de Funès, Shelley Winters, Monica Vitti, and Fernando Rey. He was part of the casts of films like Casanova by Federico Fellini, Caligula by Tinto Brass, and Contrasts by Andy Warhol. He often appeared in the final credits under the pseudonym Edouard Bergara.

=== Television ===
He ventured into television from the early 1960s in shows such as ¿Es usted el asesino?, Arsenio Lupin, Gran Hotel Carrousell with Violeta Rivas, and made his last appearances in the 1990s on Tato Bores' program Tato en la vereda del Sol, alongside Jorge Sassi and Roberto Carnaghi.

In the 1980s, he hosted a television program called Botica de Tango, which was a huge success and had very high ratings. The program, broadcast on Channel 11 (now Telefe), featured figures from national culture such as Jorge Luis Borges, Ernesto Sabato, Libertad Lamarque, Sebastián Piana, Enrique Cadícamo, and many others. The regular cast included singers Raúl Lavié, Roberto Goyeneche, Amelita Baltar, Alberto Castillo, María Graña, Beba Bidart, Alba Solís, Monica Cristian, Ricardo Chiqui Pereyra, Guillermo Fernández, Rosanna Falasca, and Jorge Sobral, among others.

The resident orchestra was conducted by Mario Marzán, and among its musicians were maestros such as Roberto Grela, Raúl Luzzi, Carlos Marzán, Ferruccio Marzán, and Osvaldo Rizzo. The program aired until the late 1980s.

=== Death ===
In March 2008, Bergara Leumann was admitted to a center of the Fundación Favaloro in Buenos Aires due to a stomach hemorrhage he had suffered. He was discharged, but his health was weak; he suffered from diabetes, heart problems, osteoarthritis, and had to use a wheelchair.

The artist died six months later in his house in Monserrat, La Botica del Ángel, on the same day as his 76th birthday, September 5th. The night before, his closest friends waited for the clock to strike midnight and surprised him with a cake and the singing of Happy Birthday. He blew out the symbolic candle, thanked his loved ones happily, and went to sleep. At 6 a.m., his personal assistant, José Luis Larrauri, brought him some medication and found that he had died.

== Botica del Ángel ==
One of the most prominent figures of the 1960s and 1970s, Bergara Leumann was one of the driving forces behind the revitalization of the neighborhood with the creation of the Botica del Ángel at 670 Lima Street, an artistic haven that welcomed a wide range of artistic expressions. In its theater, great figures of Argentine entertainment such as Pepe Cibrián Campoy, Susana Rinaldi, Nacha Guevara, Horacio Molina, Andrés Percivale, Valeria Lynch, Cuarteto Zupay, Marilina Ross, and others began their careers. Figures from tango and folklore like Tania and Libertad Lamarque appeared, as well as legends from the golden age of cinema such as Mecha Ortiz. Intellectuals and humorists like Ernesto Sabato, Emilio Stevanovich, Geno Díaz, Gila, Niní Marshall, and the group from the Di Tella Institute also gathered there.

Subsequently, La Botica moved to the larger Templo del Ángel, a building located at 541 Luis Sáenz Peña Street in Buenos Aires. In this building, Bergara Leumann had a sign that read "Botica del Ángel" placed, and it featured theatrical stages, tango courtyards, art galleries, café-concerts, and heavenly terraces, where artists such as Leonardo Favio, Susana Rinaldi, and Haydée Padilla made their debuts. In those halls, there were also a check signed by Carlos Gardel, a letter from Alfonsina Storni, paintings by Marta Peluffo, Guillermo Roux, Mariette Lydis, Quinquela Martín, Vicente Forte, and Edgardo Giménez, dresses worn by great figures such as Zully Moreno, Tania, Tita Merello, and memorabilia from Victoria Ocampo, Eva Perón, Doña Petrona, Tato Bores, among others.

In 1991, Bergara Leumann received a Konex Award for his work at La Botica: the Diploma of Merit in the discipline of One-Person Shows.
