= Jorge Salcedo (actor) =

Argentine actor (1915–1988)

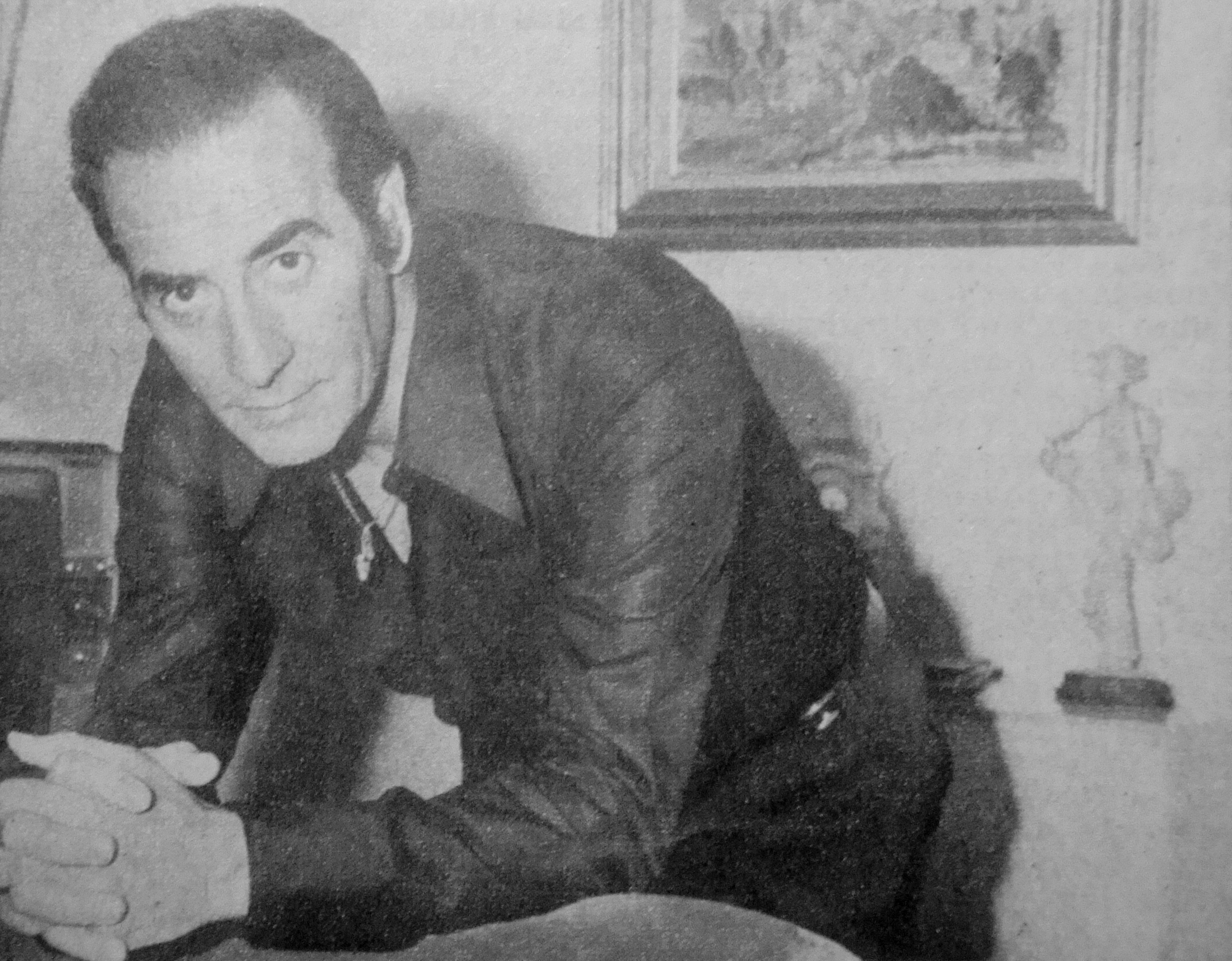
- Salcedo in Radiolandia, 1972
- Born: June 2, 1915; Buenos Aires, Argentina
- Died: April 12, 1988 (aged 72); Buenos Aires

Jorge Salcedo (June 2, 1915 – April 12, 1988) was a popular Argentine actor of radio, television and feature films, who appeared in film between 1941 and 1980, including the Golden Age of Argentine cinema.

He made over 40 film appearances in Argentina playing lead roles in films such as the 1949 Hardly a Criminal and Los Evadidos (1964) for which he won a Silver Condor for best actor. For a time, he served as the president of the Argentine Actors Associations.

== Filmography ==
- El diablo metió la pata (1980) dir. Carlos Rinaldi.
- Los drogadictos (1979) dir. Enrique Carreras.
- Los superagentes y el tesoro maldito (1978) dir. Adrián Quioga (Mario Sábato)
- Los chantas (1975) dir. José A. Martínez Suárez.
- Ceferino Indio Santo (Mi hijo Ceferino Namuncurá) (1972) dir. Jorge Mobaied
- A Bravo of the 1900s (Un guapo del 900) (1971) dir. Lautaro Murúa.
- The Neurotics (Los psexoanalizados or Los neuróticos) (1971) dir. Héctor Olivera.
- Searching ( La buscona) (1970) dir. Emilio Gómez Muriel.
- El sátiro (1970) dir. Kurt Lang.
- Amalio Reyes, un hombre (1970) dir. Enrique Carreras.
- Los hinchas o Pasión dominguera (1970) dir. Emilio Ariño.
- Sensual Jungle (Cautiva en la selva) (1969) dir. Leo Fleider.
- The Walk (El Andador) (1967) dir. Enrique Carreras.
- When Men Discuss Women (Cuando los hombres hablan de mujeres) (1967) dir. Fernando Ayala.
- The Right to Be Born (El derecho de nacer) (1966) dir. Tito Davison.
- Hotel alojamiento (1966) dir. Fernando Ayala.
- Ritmo nuevo y vieja ola (1965) dir. Enrique Carreras.
- Los hipócritas (1965) dir. Enrique Carreras.
- El Reñidero (1965) dir. René Múgica.
- Orden de matar (1965) dir. Román Vignoly Barreto.
- Mujeres perdidas (1964) dir. Rubén W. Cavallotti.
- The Escaped (Los Evadidos) (1964) dir. Enrique Carreras.
- Un viaje al más allá (1963) dir. Enrique Carreras.
- Los viciosos (1962) dir. Enrique Carreras.
- Vacation in Argentina (Vacaciones en la Argentina) (1960) dir. Guido Leoni.
- El crack (1960) dir. José A. Martínez Suárez
- The Stepmother (La madrastra) (1960) dir. Rodolfo Blasco.
- El cerco (1959) (inédita) dir. Claude Boissol.
- Edad difícil (1956) dir. Leopoldo Torres Ríos.
- Para vestir santos (1955) dir. Leopoldo Torre Nilsson.
- The Human Clay (El barro humano) (1955) dir. Luis César Amadori.
- Rescate de sangre (1952) dir. Francisco Mugica.
- Llévame contigo (1951) dir. Juan Sires.
- Mi noche triste (1951) dir. Lucas Demare.
- Edición extra (1949) dir. Luis Moglia Barth.
- La venenosa (1949) dir. Miguel Morayta.
- Corrientes, calle de ensueños (1949) dir. Román Vignoly Barreto.
- Hardly a Criminal (Apenas un delincuente) (1949) dir. Hugo Fregonese.
- Don Juan Tenorio (1949) dir. Luis César Amadori.
- Porteña de corazón (1948) dir. Manuel Romero.
- El hombre que amé (1947) dir. Alberto de Zavalía.
- La mujer más honesta del mundo (1947) dir. Leopoldo Torres Ríos.
- An Evening of Love (1943) dir. Rogelio Geissmann.
- La guerra la gano yo (I Win the War, 1943) dir. Francisco Múgica.
- The Mirror (El espejo) (1943) dir. Francisco Mugica.
- El pijama de Adán (1942) dir. Francisco Mugica.
- Embrujo (1941) (uncredited) dir. Enrique Telémaco Susini.
- Los martes, orquídeas (On Tuesdays, Orchids) (1941) (uncredited) dir. Francisco Mugica.
- You Are My Love (Mi amor eres tú) (1941) (uncredited) dir. Manuel Romero.

== Television ==
- Avenida de Mayo 1063 (1963) TV series.
- Alias Buen Mozo (1966) TV series
- Alta comedia (1 episode, Vanina Vanini 1972) TV episode
