= Llévame Contigo =

Llévame Contigo (English: Take Me With You) may refer to:

- Llévame contigo (film), a 1951 Argentine film directed by Juan Sires
- Llévame Contigo (album), a 1997 album released by Puerto Rican singer Olga Tañón
- Llévame Contigo (Take Me With You), a 1996 album by Intocable
- "Llévame Contigo" (song), a 2011 song released by American singer Romeo Santos
