= Perdices =

Perdices is plural for partridge in Spanish, but may also refer to:

- Cuando los duendes cazan perdices, 1955 Argentine film
- Perdices de mar, traditional topping in Zamora, Spain

== Surname ==
- Agustin Perdices (1934–2011), Filipino politician
- José Manuel Blecua Perdices (b. 1939), Spanish writer and member of the Real Academia Española

== Places ==
- Canal Las Perdices, canal in Santiago, Chile
- Ciclovía Las Perdices, bike path in La Reina, Chile
- Estación Las Perdices, former railroad in Coquimbo, Chile
- Laguna de las Perdices, a lake in Monte Partido, Argentina
- Las Perdices, Argentine town
- Estación Las Perdices (Mitre), train station in Las Perdices, Argentina
- Perdices (Soria), Spanish town

== See also ==
- Perdizes (disambiguation)
