= Soledad Silveyra =

Argentine actress

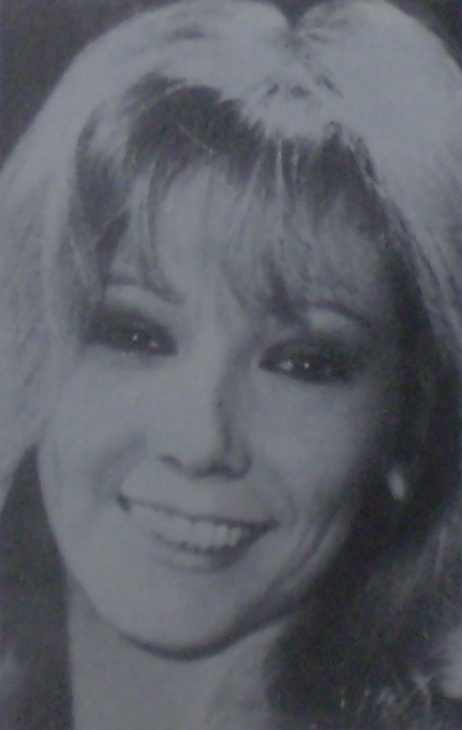
- Born: February 13, 1952 (age 74); Buenos Aires; Argentina
- Years active: 1964 -

Soledad Silveyra (Spanish pronunciation: [soleˈðað silˈβejɾa]; born February 13, 1952), is a prominent TV, theater and cinema Argentine actress.

She has made over 65 TV and film appearances since 1964. Most of her appearances have been in film and TV where she made her debut in the soap opera El Amor tiene cara de mujer in 1964 as a 12-year-old. Then, in 1972 she achieved stardom in Alberto Migré's soap operas "Rolando Rivas, taxista" and the first production of Pobre diabla.

A successful comedian she developed into a distinctive dramatic theater actress. On stage she made important appearances in The Elephant Man (play), A Taste of Honey, La malasangre by Griselda Gambaro, A Flea in Her Ear by Georges Feydeau and Lost in Yonkers both directed by China Zorrilla whom she shared the stage in Eva and Victoria, a successful theater play depicting a fictitious meeting between the political leader Eva Perón (Silveyra) and the aristocratic intellectual and writer Victoria Ocampo (Zorrilla).

Some of her most notable Argentine cinema roles include the comedy El Profesor hippie (1969), opposite Luis Sandrini, a thriller, Últimos días de la víctima (1982), opposite Federico Luppi, and the satirical Dios los cría (1991), with China Zorrilla.

During 2001-2004 she was the host of the Argentinean version of the Big Brother and also a producer and as a broadcast journalist she was the only one who was granted a solo TV interview with Cristina Fernández de Kirchner.

In 2006 she appeared in the soap opera La Ley del amor.

== Filmography ==
=== Film credits ===
- La cigarra está que arde (1967)
- Un muchacho como yo (1968)
- Psexoanálisis (1968)
- Los muchachos de antes no usaban gomina (1969)
- Quiero llenarme de ti (1969)
- El profesor hippie (1969)
- Don Segundo Sombra (1969)
- Gitano (1970)
- Los mochileros (1970)
- Los neuróticos (1971)
- Así es Buenos Aires (1971)
- Disputas en la cama (1972)
- La colimba no es la guerra (1972)
- La malavida (1973)
- ¡Quiero besarlo señor! (1973)
- Rolando Rivas, taxista (1974)
- Bodas de cristal (1975)
- Una mujer (1975)
- Los miedos (1980)
- Los crápulas (1981)
- La casa de las siete tumbas (1982)
- Últimos días de la víctima (1982)
- La Rosales (1984)
- Flores robadas en los jardines de Quilmes (1985)
- Hay unos tipos abajo (1985)
- Sostenido en La menor (1986)
- Pinocho (1986)
- Los dueños del silencio (1987)
- La clínica del Doctor Cureta (1987)
- De los Apeninos a los Andes (1990)
- Dios los cría (1991)
- Algunas mujeres - corto (1992)
- Siempre es difícil volver a casa (1992)
- Despabílate amor (1996)
- Entre la sombra y el alma - corto (1997)
- Sin reserva (1997)
- La noche del coyote (1998)
- Fábricas - en preproducción

=== TV shows ===
- Gran Hermano (2001-2004)
- Bailando por un sueño (2014-2016)

== Awards ==
=== Nominations ===
- 2013 Martín Fierro Awards
  - Best actress of daily comedy (for Mis amigos de siempre)
