= Viaje de una noche de verano =

- Directed by: Fernando Ayala; Rubén W. Cavalloti; Rodolfo Kuhn; Carlos Rinaldi; José A. Martínez Suárez; René Mugica
- Written by: Rodolfo M. Taboada
- Release date: 1965
- Running time: 105 minute
- Country: Argentina
- Language: Spanish

Viaje de una noche de verano is a 1965 Argentine film. directed by Fernando Ayala, Rubén W. Cavalloti, Rodolfo Kuhn, Carlos Rinaldi, José A. Martínez Suárez, and René Mugica.

== Cast ==
- Tato Bores
- Claudia Mores
- Enrique Dumas
- Roberto Escalada
- Néstor Fabián
- Olga Frances
- Ranko Fujisawa
- Ramona Galarza
- Iko Avo
- Juan Ramón
- Los Arribeños
- Los Wonderful's
- Los Wawancó
- Diana Maggi
- Luis Medina Castro
- Chico Novarro
- Alberto Olmedo
- María Esther Podestá
- Atahualpa Yupanqui
- Emilio Buis
- Luis Sandrini
- Marcos Zucker
- Dorita Acosta
- Alfredo Barbieri
- Blackie
- Elsa Daniel
- Ángel Magaña
- Don Pelele
- Fidel Pintos
- Juan Manuel Fangio
- Sergio Corona
