= Las apariencias engañan =

Las apariencias engañan may refer to:

- Las apariencias engañan (1958 film), an Argentine romantic comedy film
- Appearances Are Deceptive, a 1983 Mexican drama film
