= This Is My Life (1952 film) =

- Directed by: Román Viñoly Barreto
- Written by: Carlos A. Petit
- Cinematography: Alberto Etchebehere
- Edited by: José Serra
- Distributed by: Argentina Sono Film
- Release date: 1952
- Country: Argentina
- Language: Spanish

This Is My Life (Spanish: Ésta es mi vida) is a 1952 Argentine biographical film directed by Román Viñoly Barreto during the classical era of Argentine cinema.

== Cast ==
- Miguel de Molina
- Diana Maggi
- Maruja Montes
- Fidel Pintos
- Adolfo Stray
- Argentinita Vélez
- Salvador Fortuna
- Gloria Ferrandiz
- Susana Vargas
- Liana Noda
- Inés de Tolosa
- Tito Blanco
- Egle Martin
- Chela Ríos
- Tato Bores
- Claudio Martino
- Juan Villarreal
- Rafael Diserio
