= Norberto Aroldi =

Argentine actor (1931–1978)

- Born: 12 August 1931; Buenos Aires, Argentina
- Died: 19 May 1978 (aged 46); Buenos Aires, Argentina
- Years active: 1960- 1978

Norberto Aroldi (12 August 1931 – 19 May 1978) was an Argentine film actor, poet and screenwriter.

Born in Buenos Aires, he starred in the Cinema of Argentina in the 1960s and 1970s and wrote for films such as Aconcagua (1964) and El Andador (1967).

A lifelong smoker, he died of lung cancer on 19 May 1978

== Selected filmography ==
- Scandal in the Family (1967)
