= La guerra la gano yo =

La Guerra la gano yo
- Directed by: Francisco Múgica
- Written by: Carlos A. Olivari, Sixto Pondal Ríos
- Cinematography: Alfredo Traverso
- Edited by: A. Rampoldi
- Music by: Bert Rosé
- Production company: Lumiton
- Release date: 14 February 1943
- Running time: 71 minutes
- Country: Argentina
- Language: Spanish

La Guerra la gano yo (I Win the War) is a 1943 Argentine comedy film of the classical era of Argentine cinema.

== Production ==
The 71-minute black and white film was produced for Lumiton by Francisco Múgica and released on 14 February 1943. The script was written by Carlos A. Olivari and Sixto Pondal Ríos. The film starred Pepe Arias, Ricardo Passano and Alberto Contreras. The actress and singer Virginia Luque made her debut in the film at the age of sixteen.

== Synopsis ==
The owner of a small but prosperous department store, played by Pepe Arias, is pushed by his family to improve their social position. He makes heavy investments in the rubber tire business. When World War II begins, he finds that overnight he has become fabulously rich. He closes a huge deal with the Germans, but his delight turns to horror when he finds that a u-boat have sunk a freighter carrying his son, who, under pressure from his father, had left a career in the Argentine Navy for a job aboard a merchant ship. The film combines humor with biting comment on Argentina's neutral stance in the war.

== Cast ==
The cast included:

- Pepe Arias
- Ricardo Passano
- Alberto Contreras
- Virginia Luque
- Gogó Andreu
- Chela Cordero
- Perla Alvarado
- Esperanza Palomero
- Jorge Salcedo
- Carlos Montalbán
- Malena Podestá
- Bernardo Perrone
- Percival Murray
- Mercedes Gisper
- Warly Ceriani
- Sofía Merli
