= Mujeres casadas =

Argentinian movie

- Directed by: Mario Soffici
- Starring: Elina Colomer, Ana Lasalle, Francisco Martínez Allende, Nelly Panizza, Jorge Rivier
- Music by: Tito Ribero
- Release date: 12 April 1954
- Running time: 90 mins.
- Country: Argentina
- Language: Spanish

Mujeres casadas is a 1954 Argentine film directed by Mario Soffici during the classical era of Argentine cinema. It was written by Sixto Pondal Ríos and Carlos Olivari, and released on April 12, 1954, with Elina Colomer, Ana Lasalle, Francisco Martínez Allende, Nelly Panizza and Jorge Rivier in the cast.
