= Antonio Corma =

Spanish writer

- Born: 6 May 1911; Barcelona, Spain
- Died: 27 September 1971; Caracas, Venezuela
- Occupation: Writer

Antonio Corma (1911–1971) was a Spanish writer, who contributed to several screenplays during his career.

== Selected filmography ==
- The Path to Crime (1951)

== Bibliography ==
- Eduardo Jakubowicz & Laura Radetich. La historia argentina a través del cine: las "visiones del pasado" (1933–2003). La Crujía, 2006.
