= Jacinto Cascales =

Argentine film editor

- Occupation: Editor
- Years active: 1940-1971 (film)

Jacinto Cascales was an Argentine film editor. Cascales edited more than forty films during his career.

== Selected filmography ==
- The Path to Crime (1951)
- With the Music in my Soul (1951)
- The Three Musketeers (1953)
- The Terrace (1963)
- Story of a Poor Young Man (1968)

== Bibliography ==
- Cowie, Peter. World Filmography: 1967. Fairleigh Dickinson Univ Press, 1977.
