= Tito Alonso =

Argentine actor

- Born: 1926; Buenos Aires, Argentina
- Died: 1979 (aged 52–53)
- Years active: 1940 - 1979

Tito Alonso (1926–1979) was an Argentine film actor.

== Career ==
Alonso began acting in films in 1940 at the age of 14, debuting in El Inglés de los güesos.

In 1947 he appeared in A sangre fría. Alonso worked consistently in Argentine films throughout the 1950s, 60s and 1970s, appearing in the 1964 popular film Aconcagua amongst many others.

Alonso also appeared in the 1974 film Agentes Secretos Contra Guante Verde.

He made a number of appearances on TV in Argentina in the late 1960s and 1970s until his premature death in 1979 aged 53.

== Filmography ==
=== 1940s ===
- The Englishman of the Bones (1940)
- White Eagle (1941)
- Los chicos crecen (1942, a.k.a. The Kids Grow Up) (International: English title)
- Malambo (1942)
- María Celeste (1945)
- Éramos seis (1945)
- Savage Pampas (1945) - Chango
- El Misterio del cuarto amarillo (1947)
- A sangre fría (1947, a.k.a. In Cold Blood) (International: English title: informal literal title) - Hijo del Dr. Morel
- Mis cinco hijos (1948)
- Apenas un delincuente (1949) ... a.k.a. Hardly a Criminal (International: English title) - Carlos Moran
- From Man to Man (1949)

=== 1950s ===
- Filomena Marturano (1950)
- Arrabalera (1950)
- The Path to Crime (1951)
- La Última escuadrilla (1951)
- Sala de guardia (1952)
- Fierro a fondo (1952)
- Ellos nos hicieron así (1952)
- Yo soy el criminal (1954, a.k.a. Emergency Ward (International: English title))
- El Cura Lorenzo (1954)
- Sinfonía de juventud (1955)
- Los Torturados (1956) - Ernesto Mario Bravo
- Goleta austral (1956)
- Una Cita con la vida (1958)
- Procesado 1040 (1958, a.k.a. Prisoner 1040) (International: English title)) .... El Potrillo
- Campo virgen (1959)
- Campo arado (1959)

=== 1960s ===
- Interpol llamando a Río (1961)
- Une blonde comme ça (1962, a.k.a. A Blonde Like That) (International: English title)
- Aconcagua (1964)
- Canuto Cañete y los 40 ladrones (1964)
- Psique y sexo (1965)
- Los Tímidos visten de gris (1965)
- La Buena vida (1966)
- Romeo y Julieta (1966, TV Movie)
- Turismo de carretera (1968)
- Un Pacto con los brujos (1969, TV Series) - Commissary Ferreyra

=== 1970s ===
- Nino, las cosas simples de la vida (1971, TV Series) (a.k.a. Nino) (Argentina: short title) - Donato
- Juan Manuel de Rosas (1972) - Pedro de Angelis
- Nino (1972) (a.k.a. Las Cosas simples de la vida) (Argentina)
- La Mala vida (1973) - Sheriff
- Agentes Secretos Contra Guante Verde (1974)
- Novia de vacaciones (1979, TV Series) - Carmelo
