= La cuna vacía =

1949 film

- Film poster
- Directed by: Carlos Rinaldi
- Written by: Florencio Escardó
- Produced by: Lucas Demare
- Cinematography: Francis Boeniger, Humberto Peruzzi
- Music by: Lucio Demare
- Distributed by: Artistas Argentinos Asociados
- Release date: 23 May 1949
- Running time: 113 minutes
- Country: Argentina
- Language: Spanish

La cuna vacía is a 1949 Argentine melodrama film of the classical era of Argentine cinema, directed by Carlos Rinaldi on his directorial debut. It stars Ángel Magaña, Orestes Caviglia and Nelly Duggan. The film, based on a story by Florencio Escardó, covers the turbulent life of Dr. Ricardo Gutiérrez (played by Magaña).

== Plot ==
The film begins with some sequences related to the youth of Dr. Gutiérrez, his arrival in Buenos Aires from his native Arrecifes, his law studies and his frustrated life as a writer and being the subject of unrequited love. An accident resulting in the death of a child changes his vocation and he goes on to study Medicine. There are battle scenes, featuring Gutiérrez in the Civil War and the Paraguayan War and, finally, his struggles as a pediatrician.

== Cast ==
- Ángel Magaña
- Orestes Caviglia
- Nelly Duggan
- Hugo Pimentel
- José María Gutiérrez
- Zoe Ducós
- Ernesto Bianco
- Pascual Nacaratti
- Claudio Martino

== Production ==
In April 1948, the production company Artistas Argentinos Asociados signed a contract with the renowned writer, essayist, journalist and pediatrician Florencio Escardó, whose pseudonym was Piolin de Macramé, to shoot a film based on his story of Dr. Ricardo Gutiérrez. The following month, Germán Gelpi began to design the sets and Carlos Rinaldi was hired as director. The shooting of the film between July 1948 and January 1949 was long and arduous, during which the director of photography Francis Boeniger had to retire to fulfill other commitments and was replaced by Humberto Peruzzi, a collaborator who had been present from the founding of the production company. According to the critic César Maranghello, Lucas Demare, who was one of the partners of Artistas Argentinos Asociados, actively participated in the direction of the film.

== Reception ==
In 1982 the Academia Nacional de Bellas Artes described the film as "very picturesque and emotional, showing the social diseases of childhood".
