= Vigilantes y ladrones =

- VHS cover
- Directed by: Carlos Rinaldi
- Written by: Maximo Aguirre, René Múgica
- Produced by: Carmelo Vecchione
- Cinematography: Vicente Cosentino, Alberto Etchebehere
- Edited by: Jorge Gárate
- Music by: Tito Ribero
- Distributed by: Argentina Sono Film
- Release date: 23 October 1952
- Running time: 62 minutes
- Country: Argentina
- Language: Spanish

Vigilantes y ladrones ("vigilantes and robbers") is a 1952 Argentine comedy film of the classical era of Argentine cinema, directed by Carlos Rinaldi and featuring the Los Cinco Grandes del Buen Humor (Five Greats of Good Humor) group of comic actors. It stars Rafael Carret, Jorge Luz, Zelmar Gueñol, Guillermo Rico and Juan Carlos Cambón. Ángel Eleta was the choreographer for the film.

== Plot ==
The Big Five are treasure hunting in the basement of a hotel.

== Cast ==
- Rafael Carret
- Jorge Luz
- Zelmar Gueñol
- Guillermo Rico
- Juan Carlos Cambón
- Amalia Sánchez Ariño
- José Comellas
- Irma Gabriel
- Vicente Rubino
- Nelly Lainez
