= Off to Havana I Go =

- Spanish: A La Habana me voy
- Directed by: Luis Bayón Herrera
- Written by: Carlos A. Petit; Rodolfo Sciammarella
- Starring: Blanquita Amaro; Otto Sirgo
- Edited by: José Cardella
- Music by: Rodolfo Sciammarella
- Production company: Establecimientos Filmadores Argentinos (EFA)
- Release date: 1950
- Countries: Cuba; Argentina
- Language: Spanish

Off to Havana I Go (Spanish: A La Habana me voy), is a 1950 Argentine musical film of the classical era of Argentine cinema, directed by Luis Bayón Herrera and written by Carlos A. Petit and Rodolfo Sciammarella. It stars Blanquita Amaro and Otto Sirgo. It premiered on 28 June 1950.

== Cast ==
- Blanquita Amaro
- Otto Sirgo
- Tito Lusiardo
- Juan Lado
- María Esther Gamas
- Héctor Palacios
- Adolfo Stray
- Pedro Vargas
- Raquel Maceda – dancer
- Rolando García – dancer
