= Buenos Aires a la vista =

- Directed by: Luis Bayón Herrera
- Written by: Luis Bayón Herrera; Carlos A. Petit
- Starring: Dorita Acosta; Blanquita Amaro
- Release date: 1950
- Running time: 93 minutes
- Country: Argentina
- Language: Spanish

Buenos Aires a la vista is a 1950 Argentine musical drama film of the classical era of Argentine cinema, directed and written by Luis Bayón Herrera with Carlos A. Petit. The tango film premiered on September 20, 1950 in Buenos Aires.

== Cast ==
- Dorita Acosta
- Blanquita Amaro
- Francisco Audenino
- Carlos Castro
- Rafael Chumbito
- Miguel Dante
- Dringue Farías
- Ramón Garay
- Carlos A. Gordillo
- Agustín Irusta (actor)
- Oscar Llompart
- Lalo Malcolm
- Vicente Rubino
- Adolfo Stray
