= La Vida color de rosa =

- Theatrical release poster
- Directed by: León Klimovsky
- Written by: Carlos A. Petit
- Produced by: León Klimovsky
- Starring: Virginia Luque; José María Gutiérrez
- Cinematography: Alberto Etchebehere
- Edited by: José Serra
- Music by: Juan Ehlert
- Release date: 1951
- Running time: 80 minutes
- Country: Argentina
- Language: Spanish

La Vida color de rosa is a 1951 Argentine comedy film of the classical era of Argentine cinema, directed by León Klimovsky, written by Carlos A. Petit and starring Virginia Luque and José María Gutiérrez.

== Cast ==
In alphabetical order:

- Santiago Arrieta
- Magali Drexel
- Renée Dumas
- José María Gutiérrez
- Nelly Lainez
- Adolfo Linvel
- Virginia Luque
- Bertha Moss
- Fidel Pintos
- Ángel Prio
- Aída Villadeamigo
