= A Guy Like Me =

Un muchacho como yo
- Directed by: Enrique Carreras
- Written by: Ariel Cortazzo
- Based on: Ritmo, amor y picardía by Manuel Barberá
- Starring: Palito Ortega; Soledad Silveyra; Osvaldo Miranda; Beatriz Bonnet; Javier Portales
- Cinematography: Antonio Merayo
- Edited by: Jorge Gárate
- Music by: Tito Ribero
- Distributed by: Argentina Sono Film
- Release date: 14 March 1968 (Argentina)
- Running time: 85 minutes
- Country: Argentina
- Language: Spanish

A Guy Like Me (Un muchacho como yo) is a 1968 Argentine film directed by Enrique Carreras and written by Ariel Cortazzo. It's a remake of Ritmo, amor y picardía (1953), also by Carreras. It stars Palito Ortega, Soledad Silveyra, Osvaldo Miranda, Beatriz Bonnet, and Javier Portales.

It was released in Argentina on 14 March 1968.
