= Dario Vittori =

Italian-born Argentine comic actor

- Born: Melito Dario Spartaco Margozzi; 14 September 1921; Montecelio, Lazio, Italy
- Died: 19 January 2001 (aged 79); Buenos Aires, Argentina

Darío Víttori (14 September 1921 – 19 January 2001) was an Italian-born Argentine comic actor. His real name was Melito Dario Spartaco Margozzi. He was born on 14 September 1921 in Montecelio, Lazio, Italy, and died on 19 January 2001 in Buenos Aires, Argentina.

He had an extensive body of work in Argentine theatre, films and television.

== Filmography ==
- Chicos ricos (2000) Rubén
- ¿Los piolas no se casan...? (1981) Don Carmelo
- Subí que te llevo (1980)
- Frutilla (1980) Florencio Parravicini
- Así es la vida (1977) Liberti
- Los chantas (1975) Ingenieri
- Las píldoras (1972)
- Blum (1970)
- ¡Qué noche de casamiento! (1969)
- Villa Cariño está que arde (1968)
- Lo prohibido está de moda (1968)
- Digan lo que digan (1967)
- Las pirañas (1967)
- Villa Cariño (1967)
- ¡Ésto es alegría! (1967) Sr. Venturini
- De profesión sospechosos (1966) Sr. Andrade
- Orden de matar (1965) Sacerdote
- Los hipócritas (1965) Dr. Massini
- Ritmo nuevo, vieja ola (1964)
- La fin del mundo (1963)
