= Victor Hugo Caula =

Argentine cinematographer (1927–2014)

- Born: October 17, 1927
- Died: March 24, 2014 (aged 86)
- Occupations: Filmmaker cinematographer
- Years active: 1944–2005

Víctor Hugo Caula (October 17, 1927 – March 24, 2014) was an Argentinian cameraman and director of photography, with extensive participation in the production of works.

== Biography ==
In 1944, he began working at the production company Pampa Film, as a film photographer. Since then, he has worked as a photographer, cameraman and cinematographer in several companies, under the orders of different directors such as Fernando Ayala (PK), Héctor Olivera (PK) and Enrique Salaberry, among others. He was a cinematographer in more than 20 films, and cinematographer in almost 65 films.

He received the Prizes of the Association of Cinematographers of Argentina, in recognition of his contribution to Argentine cinema, the Konex Award in 1982, the Kodak Award for Best Image Treatment and the Irupé de Plata as Best Cinematographer, among other distinctions . He was honored by the Municipality of the City of Buenos Aires through the Municipal Museum of Cinema "Pablo Ducros Hicken" in recognition of his generous contribution to the National Cinema as a member of the "Generation of 60" (1982). In Rosario, he received the Prize Irupé de Plata as Director of Photography (1988).

== Selected filmography ==
Camera Operator

- La bestia desnuda (1967)
- Placer sangriento (1967)
- Hotel alojamiento (1966)
- La Venganza del sexo (1966)
- Las locas del conventillo (María y la otra) (1966)
- Con gusto a rabia (1964)
- El Hombre y su noche (1958)

Cinematography

- Cargo de conciencia (2005)
- Adiós, abuelo (1996)
- Chiquilines (1991)
- Buen viaje (1991)
- Delito de corrupción (1991)
- Más allá del tema (1989)
- Atracción peculiar (1988)
- El Profesor Punk (1988)
- Galería del terror (1987)
- Los Colimbas al ataque (1987)
- Mingo y Aníbal en la mansión embrujada (1986)
- Camarero nocturno en Mar del Plata (1986)
- Rambito y Rambón, primera misión (1986)
- Las Minas de Salomón Rey (1986)
- Los Colimbas se divierten (1986)
- Miráme la palomita (1985)
- La muerte blanca (1985)
- Mingo y Aníbal, dos pelotazos en contra (1984)
- Pasajeros de una pesadilla (1984)
- Buenos Aires Rock (1983)
- Los extraterrestres (1983)
- Los reyes del sablazo (1983)
- El arreglo (1983)
- Plata dulce (1982)
- Mire que es lindo mi país (1981)
- Te rompo el rating (1981)
- Amante para dos (1981)
- Abierto día y noche (1981)
- Las Vacaciones del amor (1981)
- Departamento compartido (1980)
- Días de ilusión (1980)
- Desde el abismo (1980)
- Custodio de señoras (1979)
- Expertos en pinchazos (1979)
- La nona (1979)
- Los éxitos del amor (1979)
- El rey de los exhortos (1979)
- Mi mujer no es mi señora (1978)
- Encuentros muy cercanos con señoras de cualquier tipo (1978)
- Fotógrafo de señoras (1978)
- Los médicos (1978)
- Las turistas quieren guerra (1977)
- El Gordo catástrofe (1977)
- Jacinta Pichimahuida se enamora (1977)
- Basta de mujeres (1977)
- El canto cuenta su historia (1976)
- Los hombres sólo piensan en eso (1976)
- El gordo de América (1976)
- Maridos en vacaciones (1975)
- Triángulo de cuatro (1975)
- Mi novia el... (1975)
- Los vampiros los prefieren gorditos (1974)
- La patagonia rebelde (1974)
- Hay que romper la rutina (1974)
- Argentinísima II (1973)
- Las venganzas de Beto Sánchez (1973)
- Hasta que se ponga el sol (1973)
- El profesor tirabombas (1972)
- Argentino hasta la muerte (1971)
- La gran ruta (1971)
- Simplemente una rosa (1971)
- Los neuróticos (1971)
- Argentinísima (1971)
- El profesor patagónico (1970)
- La guita (1970)
- La vida continúa (1969)
- El Profesor Hippie (1969)
- La fiaca (1969)
- Villa Cariño está que arde (1968)
- Una máscara para Ana (1966)

== See also ==
- Cinematographer
- Cinema of Argentina
