= Los Neuróticos =

1971 film

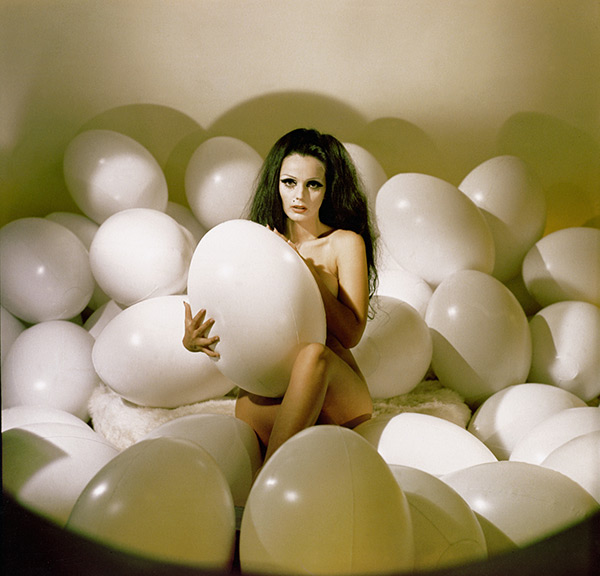
- Marcela López Rey in a still of the film
- Directed by: Héctor Olivera
- Written by: Augusto Giustozzi; Héctor Olivera
- Produced by: Fernando Ayala
- Starring: Norman Briski; Susana Giménez; Victor Bo; Marcela Lopez Rey
- Cinematography: Victor Hugo Caula
- Edited by: Oscar Montauti
- Music by: Jorge López Ruiz
- Production company: Aries Cinematográfica Argentina
- Distributed by: Aries Cinematográfica Argentina
- Release date: 1971
- Running time: 80 minute
- Country: Argentina
- Language: Spanish

Los Neuróticos is a 1971 Argentine comedy film co-written and directed by Héctor Olivera and starring Norman Briski, Susana Giménez and Victor Bo. It was originally produced and finished in 1969, but it was banned by the Argentine Classification Board (which was in charge of censoring films) during the following years.

The film underwent several cuts to submit it again in order to receive classification, but in September of 1971 the censors maintained their decision to ban the film. After several cuts and a new ratification in October, the film was finally authorized to be released in November 1971.

== Synopsis ==
The story of a psychoanalyst whose only goal is to impress the attractive women who attend his group therapies.

== Cast ==
- Víctor Bó
- Norman Briski
- Horacio Bustos
- Susana Giménez
- Marcela López Rey
- Ana María Montero
- Malvina Pastorino
- Héctor Pellegrini
- Linda Peretz
- Nathán Pinzón
- Raúl Ricutti
- Jorge Salcedo
- Soledad Silveyra
