= Aconcagua (film) =

1964 film

- Directed by: Leo Fleider
- Written by: Norberto Aroldi
- Produced by: Leo Fleider
- Starring: Tito Alonso; Enrique Kossi; Elisa Galvé; Selva Alemán
- Cinematography: Ignacio Souto
- Edited by: José Serra
- Music by: Tito Ribero
- Distributed by: Gloria Films
- Release date: 18 June 1964
- Running time: 73 minutes
- Country: Argentina
- Language: Spanish

Aconcagua is a 1964 color Argentine adventure drama film directed by Leo Fleider and written by Norberto Aroldi. The title refers to the highest peak in the Americas—Aconcagua — located in the Andes in Argentina. The star of the film is Tito Alonso.

== Synopsis ==
Personal conflicts arise among members of a mountain military detachment amidst a rescue operation that profoundly affects their lives.

== Production, distribution and release ==
Aconcagua was produced and distributed by Gloria Films and premiered in Buenos Aires on 18 June 1964.

== Cast ==
- Tito Alonso
- Enrique Kossi
- Elisa Galvé
- Selva Alemán
- Héctor Pellegrini
- Alberto Ruschel
- Enrique Talión
