= El Profesor Hippie =

El profesor hippie
- Directed by: Fernando Ayala; Héctor Olivera
- Written by: Abel Santacruz
- Produced by: Fernando Ayala; Héctor Olivera
- Starring: Luis Sandrini; Roberto Escalada; Soledad Silveyra
- Cinematography: Victor Hugo Caula
- Edited by: Oscar Montauti
- Music by: Jorge López Ruiz
- Distributed by: Aries Cinematográfica Argentina
- Release date: July 31, 1969
- Running time: 91 minutes
- Country: Argentina
- Language: Spanish

El Profesor Hippie is a 1969 Argentine musical comedy film directed by Fernando Ayala and written by Abel Santacruz which Ayala produced with Héctor Olivera. The film starred Luis Sandrini, Roberto Escalada and Soledad Silveyra. The film premiered on July 31, 1969 in Buenos Aires.

== Cast ==
- Luis Sandrini ... Professor Héctor 'Tito' Montesano
- Roberto Escalada
- Soledad Silveyra ... Nélida Echeverría
- Oscar Orlegui
- Alita Román
- Eduardo Muñoz
- Perla Santalla
- Zelmar Gueñol
- Carlos López Monet
- Flora Steinberg
- David Tonelli
- Pablo Alarcón ... Demateis
- Isidro Fernán Valdez
- Marcia Bell
