= Hardly a Criminal =

1949 film

Apenas un delincuente
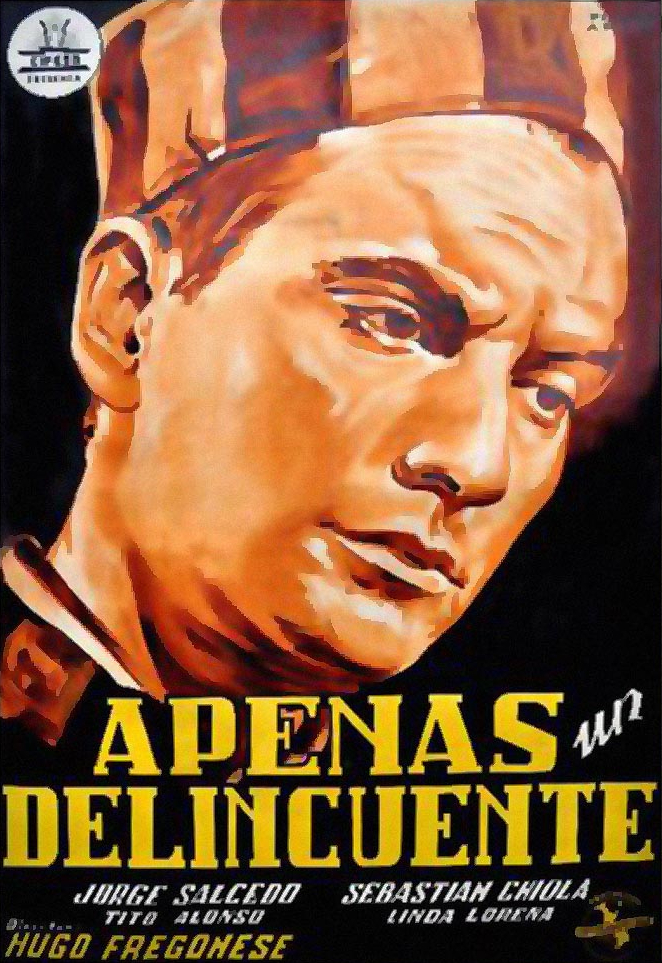
- Theatrical release poster
- Directed by: Hugo Fregonese
- Written by: Raimundo Calcagno; Israel Chas de Cruz
- Starring: Tito Alonso
- Cinematography: Roque Giaccovino
- Edited by: Tulio Demicheli; Jorge Gárate
- Release date: 1949
- Country: Argentina
- Language: Spanish

Hardly a Criminal (Spanish: Apenas un delincuente) is a 1949 Argentine crime drama directed by Hugo Fregonese and written by Raimundo Calcagno and Israel Chas de Cruz. The film started the director's Hollywood film directing career. It is one of the most celebrated films of the classical era of Argentina cinema and was re-released in theatres a few times during the 21st century.

In a survey of the 100 greatest films of Argentine cinema carried out by the Museo del Cine Pablo Ducrós Hicken in 2000, the film reached the 10th position. In a new version of the survey organized in 2022 by the specialized magazines La vida útil, Taipei and La tierra quema, presented at the Mar del Plata International Film Festival, the film reached the 27th position.

== Plot ==
Jorge Salcedo is a bank employee of modest means who wants the good things in life and fast. His girlfriend, who has just finished her law exams, tells him that the maximum imprisonment for embezzlement is six years. He is willing to pay that price in exchange for comforts of life, planning to hide the money and using it after serving his jail term. He steals half a million pesos. In the prison he faces not just his paranoia about the safety of his money bit the authorities want to recover the missing money as do many criminals in prison with him.

== Cast ==
- Tito Alonso
- Jorge Salcedo
- Homero Cárpena
- Guillermo Casali
- Sebastián Chiola
- Mario Cozza
- Rodolfo Crespi
- José De Angelis
- Alfonso Ferrari Amores
- Josefa Goldar
- Tito Grassi
- Jacinto Herrera
- Gaby Jerrico
- Linda Lorena
- Raúl Luar
- Fausto Padín
- Alberto Peyrou
- Nathán Pinzón
- Anibal Romero
- Orestes Soriani
- José A. Vázquez

== Production ==
It was mostly filmed on streets in Buenos Aires. James Mason decided to act in Fregonese's 1950 film One Way Street, when it had the working title Death on a Side Street, once he watched Hardly a Criminal.

== Release ==
The film's producers hoped that it would be successful in the United States with English subtitles. After the film's 1949 showing at the American Academy of Arts and Sciences, the director and his wife Faith Domergue held a party for multiple guests.

In 2014, the film and One Way Street was released at the Noir City: Hollywood, 16th Annual Festival of Film Noir program at the Grauman's Egyptian Theatre. It was a part of the Death is My Dance Partner: Film Noir in Postwar Argentina program, which had six features that were filmed within the time of Peronism (1949–1956), at the Museum of Modern Art in 2016. It was released with 35 mm movie film and a new English dubbing by the UCLA Film and Television Archive's Film Noir Foundation Collection. In 2020, the film was a selection at the 18th Annual San Francisco Film Noir Festival.

== Reception ==
Critics from Buenos Aires in 1949 said that it was Argentina's "outstanding film of the year". The film started the director's Hollywood film directing career. The American Cinematheque said that the film is "the best Argentine noir of the 1940s" and that it "is an audacious blending of Naked City and Brute Force". Nicolas Rapold of Film Comment wrote, "While lacking the snap of American counterparts, its laying bare of masculine pride and familial shame was hard to shake."
