= Fantasmas asustados =

- Directed by: Carlos Rinaldi
- Written by: Maximo Aguirre, René Múgica
- Produced by: Eduardo Bedoya
- Starring: Rafael Carret, Jorge Luz
- Cinematography: Francis Boeniger
- Edited by: Atilio Rinaldi, Raúl Rinaldi
- Music by: Tito Ribero
- Distributed by: Artistas Argentinos Asociados
- Release date: 18 May 1951
- Running time: 63 minutes
- Country: Argentina
- Language: Spanish

Fantasmas asustados is a 1951 Argentine comedy film of the classical era of Argentine cinema, directed by Carlos Rinaldi and featuring the Los Cinco Grandes del Buen Humor (Five Greats of Good Humor) group of comic actors. It stars Rafael Carret, Jorge Luz, Zelmar Gueñol, Guillermo Rico and Juan Carlos Cambón. It is noted for its early use (for Argentina) of female impersonation as a comic device. The film portrays Mexicans as comic characters. Jorge Negrete in particular is satirised.

== Cast ==
- Rafael Carret - Pato
- Jorge Luz - Jorge
- Zelmar Gueñol - Zelmar
- Guillermo Rico - Guille
- Juan Carlos Cambón - Cambón
- Susana Campos - Liliana Elizalde
- Marcelino Ornat - Julio César Andreotti
- Susana Vargas - Sra. Andreotti
- Alberto Barcel - Bruno
- Jorge Villoldo - Antonio
- Eduardo de Labar - Laucha
- Rafael Salvatore - Nene
- Diego Marcote - Police
- José Dorado - Raúl
- César Mariño - Comisario
- Alfonso Pisano
- Carlos Campagnale - Boy camping
- María V. de Blasco - Paralytic
- Carlos Enríquez - Butler
