= Carlos Figari =

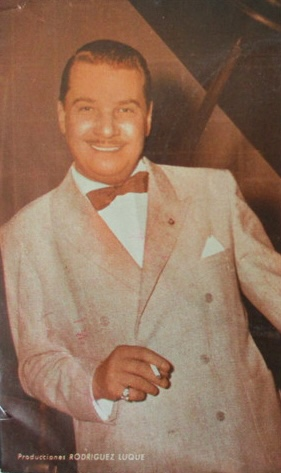
- Carlos Figari

Background information
- Born: Carlos Alberto Figari; 3 August 1913; Buenos Aires, Argentina
- Origin: Argentina
- Died: 22 October 1994 (aged 81) Buenos Aires, Argentina
- Genres: Tango
- Occupations: Pianist, composer, conductor
- Instrument: Piano

Carlos Alberto Figari (3 August 1913 – 22 October 1994) was an Argentine tango pianist, composer, and orchestra conductor.

== Early life ==
His parents were Lorenzo Ramón Figari and Cecilia Accialini. He was born in the San Telmo neighborhood and showed an interest in music from a young age. As a result, he studied piano, first with a teacher from his neighborhood and later at the Troiani Conservatory.

He was 16 years old when he joined the ensemble of brothers Antonio and Gerónimo Sureda as a pianist. The group also included Oscar Valpreda and the singer Alberto Tagle, who would later become the vocalist for Enrique Mora and for Domingo Federico’s first orchestra.

== Professional career ==
In 1937, Gerónimo left the orchestra, which then became the Antonio Sureda orchestra. In 1939, Alberto Tagle was replaced by Juan Alessio, who would later use the pseudonym Jorge Ortiz when he joined Rodolfo Biagi.

In 1941, he joined the orchestra Los Zorros Grises, directed by José García. The following year, the group recorded for the Odeon label Esta noche de luna by García and Graciano Gómez, with lyrics by Héctor Marcó and vocals by Alfredo Rojas, as well as the instrumental tango Retirao by Carlos Posadas, in which Figari's musical style and temperament were already evident. Around that time, he also substituted for Mariano Mores during his temporary absences from Francisco Canaro’s orchestra.

When in 1944 the singer Francisco Fiorentino left Aníbal Troilo’s orchestra, he formed his own orchestra—after a brief partnership with Orlando Goñi—which Figari joined as pianist. The other members were violinists Hugo Baralis, Cayetano Gianni, and Bibiloni Lucero; the double bassist José Díaz; and the bandoneonists Roberto Di Filipo, Ángel Genta, Fernando Tell, and Astor Piazzolla, who was also the director. They debuted on Radio Belgrano and at the "Picadilly" café located at 1524 Corrientes Street, and Figari stayed with the orchestra for three years.

On July 4, 1947, he joined Troilo's orchestra, replacing José Basso, and showcased his refined technique there for seven years. They recorded 96 pieces, including two instrumentals composed by him: A la parrilla (June 1949) and Tecleando (1952). There were also compositions by Piazzolla: Para lucirse, Prepárense, Contratiempo, Triunfal, Contrabajendo, Lo que vendrá, and Tanguango, whose performance featured a significant contribution from Figari.

Figari debuted on Radio Splendid on April 16, 1955, with his own orchestra, featuring Armando Calderaro, nicknamed "Pajarito," as first bandoneonist and arranger, and the singer Enrique Dumas. Around that time, he performed at the "Confitería Montecarlo" and recorded for the Music Hall label, among others, his piece A la parrilla and Bien jaileife by Vicente Demarco with lyrics by Silvio Marinucci, featuring Dumas’ vocals.

In 1956, the singer Edmundo Rivero chose him to arrange the music for El ciruja, Jamás me olvidarás, Por ella, Fugitiva, Escríbeme, and Tessa, and to accompany him with his orchestra to record them for the T.K. label. He also accompanied Rivero in his performances on Radio El Mundo.

The following year, he performed a season at the Adlon café with Héctor Omar as his new singer, accompanied the Brazilian singer Carlos Lombardi on the radio, and went on a tour with him through São Paulo and Rio de Janeiro. Upon returning, he replaced Omar with Ricardo Argentino. At the end of the 1950s, he joined Radio del Pueblo, performing with singers Enrique Dumas and Aldo Fabre.

Later, he dissolved the orchestra and formed a quartet with which he accompanied Tania at the Cambalache venue, located at 832 Libertad Street, which was owned by her.

In 1961, he formed a partnership with Dumas to record for the Disc-Jockey label while they continued at Radio del Pueblo. He also participated on television, in the program Esquina del tango, with his new singer Alberto Marcó.

In 1966, he was in charge of the musical direction of the Creole zarzuela Juanita la popular, by Enrique Cadícamo, which premiered at the Teatro General San Martín with the participation of, among other actors, Homero Cárpena, Juan Carlos Altavista and Elena Lucena.

At the end of the 1960s, he became a regular figure at "El Viejo Almacén," owned by his friend Edmundo Rivero, and made recordings with Tita Merello for the Odeon label.

== Death ==
Figari died in Buenos Aires on October 22, 1994.

== In films ==
He participated with Troilo's orchestra in film and theater: El tango vuelve a París in 1948, Mi noche triste in 1952, and the play by Cátulo Castillo, El patio de la morocha, in 1954.
