= Perdizes =

Perdizes may refer to:

- GD Vilar de Perdizes, Portuguese football team
- Perdizes (barrio of São Paulo)
- Paróquia São Geraldo das Perdizes, church in São Paulo
- Perdizes (district of São Paulo)
- Perdizes (São Paulo Metro)
- Perdizes, Minas Gerais
- Vilar de Perdizes, freguesia
- Vilar de Perdizes e Meixide, freguesia

== See also ==
- Perdices (disambiguation)
