= The Secret Agents Against Green Glove =

Los Agentes secretos contra Guante Verde
- Screenshot
- Directed by: Alberto Abdala
- Written by: Alberto Abdala
- Produced by: Alberto Abdala
- Starring: Tito Alonso
- Cinematography: José Antonio Pizzi
- Music by: Horacio Malviccino
- Release date: 1974
- Running time: minutes
- Country: Argentina
- Language: Spanish

Los Agentes secretos contra Guante Verde (English language:The Secret Agents Against Green Glove) is a 1974 Argentine drama film directed and written by Alberto Abdala and Sergio L. Mottola. The film starred Tito Alonso.

== Cast ==
- Tito Alonso
- Rey Charol
- Luis Cordara
- Mónica Escudero
- Mónica Grey
- Arturo Noal
- Juan Ramón
- Raúl Ricutti
- Daniel Ripari
- Perla Santalla
- Mario Savino
- Walter Soubrie
- Nino Udine
- Guadalupe

== Release ==
The film premiered on 15 October 1974 in Buenos Aires.
