= Un hombre cualquiera =

Un Hombre cualquiera
- Directed by: Carlos Rinaldi
- Release date: 1954
- Country: Argentina
- Language: Spanish

Un Hombre cualquiera is a 1954 Argentine film directed by Carlos Rinaldi during the classical era of Argentine cinema.
