= No apto para menores =

- Release date: 1979
- Running time: 88 minute
- Country: Argentina
- Language: Spanish

No apto para menores is an unreleased Argentine film directed by Carlos Rinaldi. The film's release was blocked by the censorship authorities in 1979. It has only "be seen by a few".

== Cast ==
- Enzo Viena
- Thelma Stefani
- Daniel Miglioranza
- Elena Sedova
- Stella Maris Lanzani
- Hugo Arana

== Production ==
The film was partially shot in San Luis.
