= Pobre pero honrado =

- Directed by: Carlos Rinaldi
- Written by: Carlos A. Petit
- Release date: 1955
- Running time: 72 minute
- Country: Argentina
- Language: Spanish

Pobre pero honrado is a 1955 Argentine film.
