= A Cuban in Spain =

- Directed by: Luis Bayón Herrera
- Written by: Marcos H. Bronemberg; Carlos A. Petit; Luis Bayón Herrera
- Produced by: Juan Manuel de Rada
- Starring: Blanquita Amaro; Mario Cabré; Marujita Díaz
- Cinematography: Hugo Chiesa
- Edited by: Juan Serra
- Music by: Juan Quintero
- Production company: CIFESA
- Distributed by: CIFESA
- Release date: 1 September 1951
- Running time: 70 minutes
- Countries: Argentina; Cuba; Spain
- Language: Spanish

A Cuban in Spain (Spanish:Una Cubana en España) is a 1951 musical comedy film directed by Luis Bayón Herrera during the classical era of Argentine cinema. It was a co-production between Argentina, Cuba and Spain. The film's sets were designed by Francisco Prósper and Pierre Schild.

== Cast ==
- Blanquita Amaro as Blanquita
- Rafael Bardem as Don Agustín
- Joaquín Bergía as Amigo
- Francisco Bernal as Traspunte
- Mario Cabré as Miguel Escudero
- María Cuevas as Mujer 1ª
- Luis Domínguez Luna as Empleado del detective
- Marujita Díaz as Rosita
- Manuel Guitián as Maquinista 1º
- Casimiro Hurtado as Gitano
- José Isbert as Jose Holmes Pérez
- Juan Lado
- Tito Lusiardo as Tito León
- Concha López Silva as Adivina
- Mónica Pastrana as Elena
- Lola del Pino as Mujer 2ª
- Antonio Riquelme as Maquinista 2º
- Jacinto San Emeterio as Roberto
- Otto Sirgo
- Juan Vázquez as Camarero
