= With the Music in my Soul =

Con la música en el alma
- Directed by: Luis Bayón Herrera
- Written by: Carlos A. Petit; Homero Manzi
- Produced by: Francisco Canaro
- Cinematography: Roque Funes
- Edited by: Jacinto Cascales
- Music by: Francisco Canaro
- Distributed by: E.F.A. Río de la Plata
- Release date: January 1, 1951
- Running time: 80 minutes
- Country: Argentina
- Language: Spanish

Con la música en el alma (English language: "With the music in my soul") is a 1951 Argentine musical film of the classical era of Argentine cinema, directed by Luis Bayón Herrera and written by Carlos A. Petit. The tango film stars Francisco Canaro (also the producer) and Olga Casares Pearson.

== Cast ==
- Jaime Andrada
- Alberto Arenas
- Olga Casares Pearson
- Irma Denás
- Ramón Garay
- Marga Landova
- Tito Lusiardo
- Andrés Poggio 'Toscanito'
- Alberto Rudoy
