= Máximo Berrondo =

Argentine actor, screenwriter and film director (1927–2024)

- Born: 6 June 1927; Buenos Aires, Argentina
- Died: 1 May 2024 (aged 96); Buenos Aires, Argentina
- Occupation: Film director

Máximo Berrondo (6 June 1927 – 1 May 2024) was an Argentine actor, screenwriter and film director.

Berrondo died on 1 May 2024, at the age of 96.

== Selected filmography ==
- The Path to Crime (1951)
- The Mission (1986)

== Bibliography ==
- Martín, Jorge Abel. Cine argentino. Ediciones Corregidor, 1983.
