= La Muerte en las calles =

- Directed by: Leo Fleider
- Written by: Abel Santa Cruz
- Release date: 1952
- Running time: 83 minute
- Country: Argentina
- Language: Spanish

La Muerte en las calles (The Death in the Streets) is a 1952 Argentine war drama film set during the British Invasions of the River Plate of 1806-1807. The script, written by Abel Santa Cruz, is based upon a 1949 novel of the same name by Manuel Gálvez.

== Plot ==
In Buenos Aires, during the British invasions of the Río de la Plata, a British army officer is billeted in the house of a wealthy local family. The head of the family, a Spanish merchant, compells his daughter to marry the guest, believing they were engaged in a hidden romance.

== Cast ==
- Carlos Cores
- Zoe Ducós
- George Rigaud
- Antonia Herrero
- Manuel Perales
- Roberto Airaldi
- Francisco López Silva
- Paquita Muñoz
- Norma Giménez
- Margarita Corona
- Héctor Armendáriz
- Norma Aleandro
- Cayetano Biondo
- Gerardo Rodríguez
- José María Pedroza
- Armando de Vicente
- Lita Soriano
- Ricardo de Rosas
- Humberto de la Rosa
- Arsenio Perdiguero
- Pedro Aleandro
- Oscar Llompart
- Miguel Dante
- Alfonso Pisano
