= Desalmados en pena =

- Directed by: Leo Fleider
- Written by: Maximo Aguirre
- Release date: 1954
- Country: Argentina
- Language: Spanish

Desalmados en pena is a 1954 film of the classical era of Argentine cinema.
