= Amor a primera vista =

- Directed by: Leo Fleider
- Written by: Abel Santacruz; Jean Cartier
- Production company: Argentina Sono Film
- Release date: 1956
- Running time: 85 minute
- Country: Argentina
- Language: Spanish

Amor a primera vista (English language: Love at first Sight) is a 1956 Argentine musical comedy directed by Leo Fleider and written by Abel Santacruz and Jean Cartier. It is a tango film, based on an integral part of Argentine culture.

== Cast ==
- Lolita Torres....Matilde Alvarezza / Carlitos
- Osvaldo Miranda....Mario de la Rosa
- Ramón Garay....Valentín Saporiti
- Susana Campos....Lucía
- Morenita Galé....Manón
- Josefa Goldar....mrs. Clara
- Nelly Lainez....Rosario
- Mónica Linare....Mecha
- Lalo Malcolm....mr. César
- Marcos Zucker....Jaime
