= Free Spirit (film) =

Alma liberada
- Directed by: Edmundo del Solar
- Written by: Edmundo del Solar
- Starring: Juan Corona; María de la Fuente; Pilar Gómez; Iván Grondona
- Cinematography: Gumer Barreiros
- Release date: 9 July 1951
- Country: Argentina
- Language: Spanish

Free Spirit (Spanish: Alma liberada) is a 1951 Argentine drama film directed and written by Edmundo del Solar during the classical era of Argentine cinema. The film premiered on 9 July 1951 in Buenos Aires.

The film starred Juan Corona, María de la Fuente, Pilar Gómez, Iván Grondona and Josefina Ríos. Director Edmundo del Solar also appeared in the film.
