= Sensual Jungle =

- Spanish: Cautiva en la selva
- Directed by: Leo Fleider
- Release date: 1969
- Running time: 85 minute
- Country: Argentina
- Language: Spanish

Sensual Jungle (Spanish: Cautiva en la selva) is a 1969 Argentine film directed by Leo Fleider.
