= Campo arado =

1959 film

- Directed by: Leo Fleider
- Written by: Ernesto L. Castro, Osvaldo Falabella
- Starring: Alfredo Almanza, Tito Alonso, Julio Di Palm
- Cinematography: Ricardo Younis
- Edited by: José Serra
- Release date: 1959
- Running time: 105 minute
- Country: Argentina
- Language: Spanish

Campo arado is a 1959 black-and-white Argentine film directed by Polish-born Argentine screenwriter and director Leo Fleider. The screenplay, written by Ernesto L. Castro and Osvaldo Falabella, is based on a novel by Ernesto L. Castro.

== Plot ==
The story revolves around a family who has lived in a rural area in Buenos Aires for three generations.

== Cast ==
- Alfredo Almanza
- Tito Alonso
- Julio Di Palma
- Luis Dávila
- Ricardo Galache
- Josefa Goldar
- Santiago Gómez Cou
- Chela Jordán
- Silvia Legrand
- René Lester
- Claudio Martino
- Fernanda Mistral
- Luis Otero
- Nelly Panizza
