= Volver a la vida =

- Directed by: Carlos F. Borcosque
- Written by: Américo Hoss (novel)
- Produced by: Manuel Alba, Kurt Löwe
- Cinematography: Américo Hoss
- Edited by: José Cañizares
- Music by: George Andreani
- Release date: 12 January 1951
- Running time: 96 minutes
- Country: Argentina
- Language: Spanish

Volver a la vida is a 1951 Argentine film directed by Carlos F. Borcosque during the classical era of Argentine cinema.

== Cast ==
- Amedeo Nazzari
- Malisa Zini
- Juan Carlos Barbieri
- Golde Flami
- Felisa Mary
- María Esther Buschiazzo
- Lalo Maura
- Raúl Miller
- Yuki Nambá
- Ada Cornaro
- Rafael Salvatore
- Enrique Abeledo
- Nino Persello
- Cirilo Etulain
- A. Fidel Britos
- Carlos Borcosque (junior)
