= El Patio de la Morocha =

- Directed by: Manuel Romero
- Written by: Cátulo Castillo; Mariano Mores
- Starring: Virginia Luque
- Release date: 14 August 1951
- Running time: 94 minutes
- Country: Argentina
- Language: Spanish

El Patio de la Morocha (English language: The Patio of the Brunette, also known in Spanish as Arriba el Telón) is a 1951 Argentine musical drama film of the classical era of Argentine cinema, directed by Manuel Romero and written by Cátulo Castillo and Mariano Mores. The film premiered in early 1951 in Buenos Aires. The film starred Virginia Luque.

The film is a tango-based film, which is an integral part of Argentine culture.

== Plot ==
A security guard's granddaughter, who works at an old theater awaiting demolition, dreams of becoming a famous singer like her mother.

== Main cast ==
- Hugo Del Carril first actor together Virginia Luque
- Francisco Audenino
- Sofía Bozán .... Herself
- Mario Faig
- Severo Fernandez
- Jovita Luna
- Virginia Luque
- Juan Carlos Mareco
- Juan José Porta
- Antonio Provitilo
- Dora Vernet
- León Zárate

== See also ==
- List of works by Manuel Romero
