= Arriba Juventud =

Arriba, juventud! / Youth has Arrived
- Directed by: Leo Fleider
- Written by: Leo Fleider; Jorge Falcón
- Produced by: Leo Fleider
- Starring: Roko; Rosanna Falasca
- Cinematography: Ricardo Younis
- Edited by: Rosalino Caterbeti
- Music by: Óscar Anderle; Francisco Canaro
- Release date: 4 March 1971
- Running time: 85 minutes
- Country: Argentina
- Language: Spanish

Arriba, juventud! (English title: Youth has Arrived) is a 1971 Argentine musical film comedy about a musical group, directed and written by Leo Fleider and starring Roko and Rosanna Falasca. The film premièred on 4 March 1971 in Buenos Aires.

== Cast ==
- Roko
- Palolo
- Rosanna Falasca
- Roberto Airaldi
- Mario Amaya
- Rodolfo Crespi
- Noemí del Castillo
- Eddie Pequenino
- Oscar Petri
- Fidel Pintos
- Vicente Rubino
