= Egle Martin =

Argentine singer and actress (1936–2022)

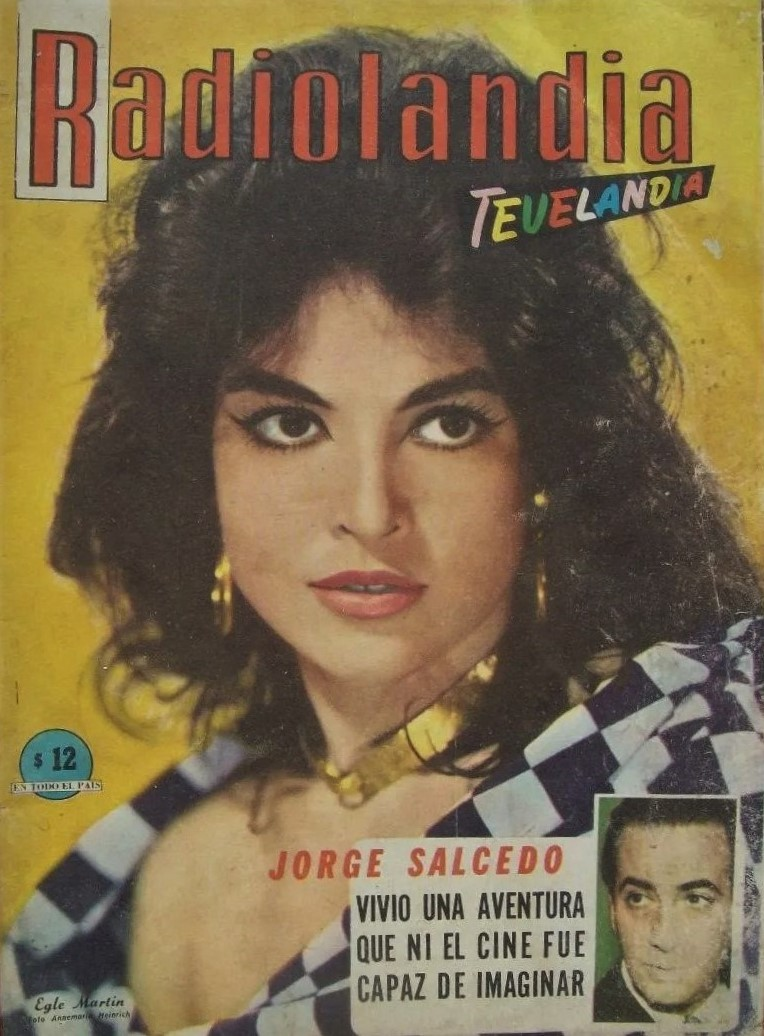
- Martin in the cover of the magazine Radiolandia, 1962
- Born: Egle Lucía Martínez Furque; 17 June 1936; Buenos Aires, Argentina
- Died: 14 August 2022 (aged 86); Buenos Aires, Argentina

Egle Lucía Martínez Furque (17 June 1936 – 14 August 2022), best known as Egle Martin, was an Argentine singer and actress.

== Life and career ==
Born in Buenos Aires, the daughter of writer Verónica Berry, Martin began studying classical dance at the age of seven, and started her professional career in 1952, taking part in the film This Is My Life. After making her stage debut in musical comedy, from 1956 she specialized in the revue genre, becoming "the first vedette who danced, sang and created her own choreographies, scenery and wardrobe". She was also active on television, notably being a protagonist, together with Pipo Mancera and her then-lover Astor Piazzolla, of the variety show La noche, and on radio, in which she presented the musical program Vivir es todo esto.

Thanks to her friendship to Dizzy Gillespie Martin was introduced to jazz music and African-American folklore, which became objects of her researches and the basis for several of her stage shows. Also interested in the Brazilian music and culture, she is regarded as the one who introduced capoeira music in Argentina. Her collaborations include Gilberto Gil, Vinicius de Moraes, Jorge Luis Borges, Oscar Alemán, Lalo Schifrin, Maysa Matarazzo. In her later years, she moved to Barracas, where she directed a multidisciplinary training school of music, dance and acting.

Martin received various honors and awards, notably the title of Master of Argentine Art and Culture by the National Institute of Anthropology and Latin American Thought in 2003. She was the inspiration for the Astor Piazzolla-Horacio Ferrer opera "María de Buenos Aires". She died on 14 August 2022, at the age of 86.
