= The Beautiful Brummel =

- Directed by: Julio Saraceni
- Written by: Manuel M. Alba; Abel Santacruz
- Starring: Fidel Pintos; Delfy de Ortega; Amadeo Novoa
- Cinematography: Américo Hoss
- Edited by: José Gallego
- Music by: Tito Ribero
- Release date: 26 June 1951
- Running time: 92 minutes
- Country: Argentina
- Language: Spanish

The Beautiful Brummel (Spanish: El Hermoso Brummel) is a 1951 Argentine historical comedy film of the classical era of Argentine cinema, directed by Julio Saraceni and starring Fidel Pintos, Delfy de Ortega and Amadeo Novoa. The film's sets were designed by the art director Gori Muñoz.

== Plot ==
In the early nineteenth century, a valet assumes the identity of his master and must confront the challenges of this deception in society.

== Cast ==
- Fidel Pintos
- Delfy de Ortega
- Amadeo Novoa
- Susana Campos
- Carlos Barbetti
- Carlos Enríquez
- Julia Sandoval
- Lucio Deval
- Alberto Terrones
- Irma Roy
- María Esther Rodrigo
- Ricardo Legarreta
- Pedro Aleandro
- Daniel Tedeschi...Extra
- Mario Pocoví
- Julián Bourges
