= Josefina Robirosa =

Argentinean painter (1932–2022)

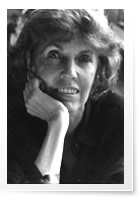
- Robirosa in 1970
- Born: 26 May 1932
- Died: 20 May 2022 (aged 89)
- Other name: Josefina Miguens
- Education: Studied under Héctor Basaldúa and Elisabeth von Rendell
- Known for: Painting, murals, drawing
- Movement: Siete pintores abstractos; Torcuato di Tella Institute circle
- Spouses: José Enrique Miguens; Jorge Michel
- Children: 2

Josefina Robirosa (26 May 1932 – 20 May 2022) was an Argentine artist known for her paintings, murals, and drawings. She is considered one of Argentina's most prominent women painters.

== Biography ==
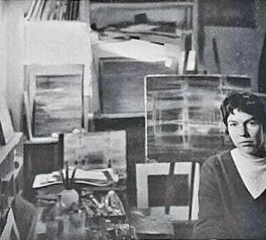
Portrait of Robirosa (then known as Josefina Miguens) published in the exhibition catalogue for Siete pintores abstractos at Galería Pizarro, 1957.

Josefina Robirosa was born in 1932 to an aristocratic Buenos Aires family. She grew up in the Palacio Sans Souci, a grand residence in the Lomas de San Isidro suburb.

Painting was her passion from a young age. She went on to study with Héctor Basaldúa and Elisabeth von Rendell. Her first solo exhibit was held in 1957 at the Galería Bonino in Buenos Aires, followed by eight more exhibitions at the same gallery over the course of several years. Later, she exhibited at the Rubbers and Ruth Benzacar galleries.

In 1957, she joined with fellow artists Marta Peluffo, Rómulo Macció, Clorindo Testa, Víctor Chab, Kazuya Sakai, and Osvaldo Borda to form the group Siete pintores abstractos ("Seven Abstract Painters"). She was also a member of a group of artists associated with the Torcuato di Tella Institute who revolutionized the artistic understanding of Argentina in the 1960s.

Robirosa is especially known for her public murals, including at two subway stations in the Buenos Aires Underground and the Argentine station of the Paris Métro. Her work has been in the collections of the Museo Nacional de Bellas Artes in Buenos Aires, the Buenos Aires Museum of Modern Art, the Museo Genaro Pérez in Córdoba, and the Museo de Tres Arroyos. A retrospective exhibition of her paintings was displayed at the Museo Nacional de Bellas Arts in 1997 and at the Centro Cultural Recoleta in 2001.

For eight years, she served as director of the Fondo Nacional de las Artes, and she was an emeritus member of the Argentine National Academy of Fine Arts.

She had two children with her first husband, the sociologist José Enrique Miguens. Her second husband was the sculptor Jorge Michel.

Robirosa died in 2022, less than a week shy of her 90th birthday.
