= Country Corner =

- Directed by: Raúl Medina
- Written by: José Rodríguez Díaz (play); Yeyo Arias; Caridad Bravo Adams; Pedro Pablo Chávez
- Produced by: Salvador Behar
- Starring: Blanquita Amaro; Néstor de Barbosa
- Cinematography: Ricardo Delgado
- Edited by: Enrique Bravo
- Music by: Obdulio Morales
- Production companies: Estudios Nacionales; Ibero American Films
- Distributed by: Columbia Pictures Mexico
- Release date: 12 June 1950
- Running time: 90 minutes
- Country: Cuba
- Language: Spanish

Country Corner (Spanish: (Spanish: Rincón criollo) is a 1950 Cuban musical film directed by Raúl Medina and starring Blanquita Amaro, Néstor de Barbosa and Jose Sanabria.

== Cast ==
- Blanquita Amaro as Rosita
- Néstor de Barbosa as José Manuel
- Jose Sanabria as Don Jaime
- Carlos Pous as Pitirre
- Paco Alfonso as Don Hilario
- Asunción del Peso
- José de San Antón
- Cándita Quintana as Candelaria
- Yeyo Arias
- Zulema Casal as Doña Teresa
- Viejito Bringuier as Viejito
- Los Panchos as Themselves
- Fernando Albuerne as himself
- Manolo Fernández as himself
- Rosita Díaz as herself
- Celia Cruz as herself
- Celina y Reutilio as Themselves
- Paquita de Ronda as herself
- Juan José Martínez Casado as himself
- Ñico Saquito as himself

== Bibliography ==
- Alfonso J. García Osuna. The Cuban Filmography: 1897 through 2001. McFarland, 2003.
