= Don Napy =

Argentine screenwriter and film director

- Born: 7 September 1909; Argentina
- Died: 11 July 1962 (age 52)
- Other name: Luis Napoleón Duclout
- Occupations: Screenwriter, Director
- Years active: 1936-1954 (film)

Don Napy (1909–1962) was an Argentine screenwriter and film director. He was born in Argentina as Luis Napoleón Duclout.

After working as a journalist, he moved into the film industry. He made his directorial debut in 1950 and made five films over the following three years including The Path to Crime (1951).

He also narrated the 1954 travelogue Buenos Aires in Relief - the first Argentine 3D film.

== Selected filmography ==
=== Director ===
- The Path to Crime (1951)

== Bibliography ==
- Elena, Alberto & Lopez, Marina Diaz. The Cinema of Latin America. Columbia University Press, 2013.
