= The Bohemian Soul =

Alma de bohemio
- Directed by: Julio Saraceni
- Written by: Carlos A. Petit; Rodolfo Sciammarella
- Starring: Margarita Burke; Alberto Castillo; Fidel Pintos
- Cinematography: Antonio Merayo
- Edited by: José Serra
- Music by: Rodolfo Sciammarella
- Release date: 1949
- Running time: 88 minute
- Country: Argentina
- Language: Spanish

Alma de bohemio (English language: The Bohemian Soul) is a 1949 Argentine film of the classical era of Argentine cinema, directed by Julio Saraceni and written by Carlos A. Petit with Rodolfo Sciammarella. It stars Alberto Castillo and Fidel Pintos.

== Cast ==
- Alberto Castillo
- Fidel Pintos
- Lilian Valmar
- Lalo Malcolm
- Rodolfo Díaz Soler
- Anita Beltrán
- Arturo Palito
- Betty Lagos
- Diana Maggi
- Cirilo Etulain
- Vicente Forastieri
- Nora Gilbert
- Luis García Bosch
- Pablo Cumo
- Margarita Burke
- Vicente Rubino
- Rafael Diserio
