= Blanquita Amaro =

Cuban film actress (1923–2007)

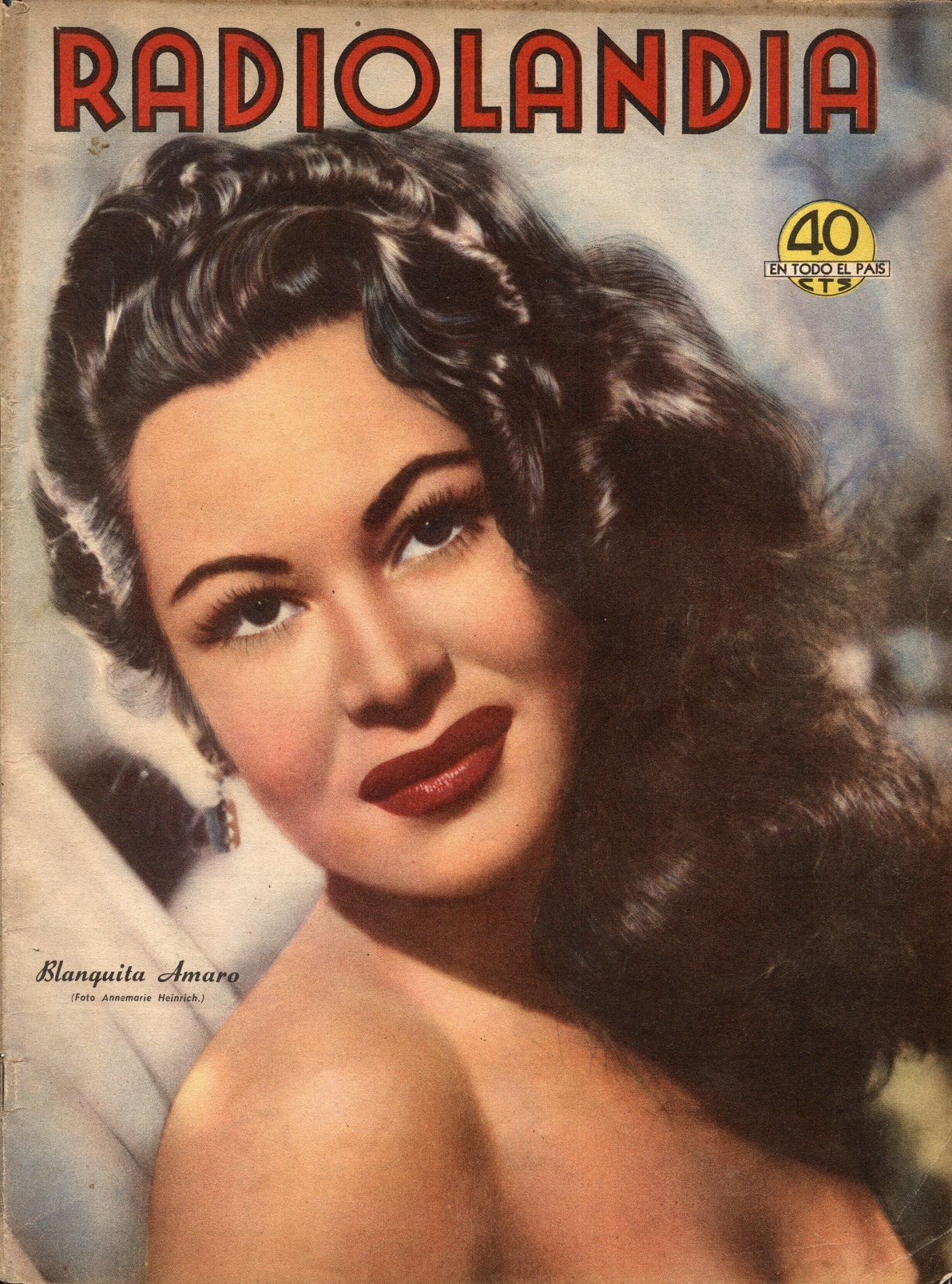
- Born: June 30, 1923; San Antonio de los Baños, Cuba
- Died: March 15, 2007 (aged 83); Miami, Florida, US
- Years active: 1939–1996

Blanquita Amaro (June 30, 1923 in San Antonio de los Baños, Cuba – March 15, 2007 in Miami, United States) was a Cuban film actress of the 1940s and early 1950s who starred in the Golden Age of Argentine cinema.

She appeared in some 17 films between 1939 and 1954 appearing often in films involving her native Cuba in co-production with Argentina such as A La Habana me voy (I'm Coming to Havana), working under director Luis Bayón Herrera. She also appeared in films such as Buenos Aires a la vista in 1950 though which on the contrary had strong Argentine themes in it.

She retired from films in 1954.

== Post film work ==
Amaro later in life

She left Cuba for Panama in 1959, and settled there with her husband and manager, Orlando Villegas, and their daughter, Idania. For 10 years, she hosted a daily television program and participated in many benefit shows.

Blanquita Amaro died, aged 83, in Miami of a heart attack.

== Filmography ==
- Bésame mucho (1944),
- Casada y señorita (1954)
- Mi viudo y yo (1954)
- Bella, la salvaje (1953)
- Bárbara atómica (1952)
- Locuras, tiros y mambos (1951)
- A Cuban in Spain (1951) .... Blanquita
- A La Habana me voy (1951)
- Buenos Aires à la vista (1950)
- Rincón criollo (1950)
- Seductor, El (1950)

a.k.a. The Seductor (International: English title)

- Noche en el Ta-Ba-Rín, Una (1949)
- Caribbean Enchantment (1947)
- Bésame mucho (1945)
- Escándalo de estrellas (1944) .... Elena Silveira
- Summer Hotel (1944)
- Prófugos (1940)
- Estampas Habaneras (1939) .... Caridad Valdes
