= The Walker (1967 film) =

1967 film by Enrique Carreras

- Theatrical release poster
- Directed by: Enrique Carreras
- Written by: Norberto Aroldi
- Based on: El Andador by Norberto Aroldi
- Release date: 24 August 1967
- Running time: 90 minute
- Country: Argentina
- Language: Spanish

The Walker (Spanish: El Andador) is a 1967 Argentine comedy drama film directed by Enrique Carreras and written by Norberto Aroldi. The film was based on the play of the same name written by Aroldi.

== Cast ==
- Tita Merello .... Rosa Mangiacaballo
- Jorge Salcedo .... Julian
- Luis Tasca .... Carmelo
- Gloria Ferrandiz .... Dona Felisa
- Marta Cipriano .... Juanita
- Juan Carlos Altavista .... Gorosito
- Oscar Villa .... Pato
- Adolfo García Grau .... Doctor Perales
- Jorge De La Riestra .... Nato
- Alberto Olmedo
- Alfonso Pícaro
- Atilio Pozzobon

== Release ==
The film premiered in Argentina on 24 August 1967.
