= The Path to Crime =

- Directed by: Don Napy
- Written by: Antonio Corma; Don Napy
- Starring: Tito Alonso; Juan Carlos Altavista; Máximo Berrondo
- Cinematography: Roque Funes
- Edited by: Jacinto Cascales
- Music by: Tito Ribero
- Release date: 22 March 1951 (Argentina)
- Running time: 83 minutes
- Country: Argentina
- Language: Spanish

The Path to Crime (Spanish: Camino al crimen) is a 1951 Argentine comedy film directed and co-written by Don Napy during the classical era of Argentine cinema.

== Cast ==
- Tito Alonso
- Juan Carlos Altavista
- Máximo Berrondo
- Juan Carlos Bettini ... Director
- Tato Bores
- José Canosa
- Paula Darlan
- Horacio Delfino
- Julio Heredia
- David Lederman ... (as Dawid Lederman)
- Diego Marcote ... Guarda de tranvía
- Justo Martinez
- José Maurer
- Enrique de Pedro
- Pedro Prevosti

== Bibliography ==
- Elena, Alberto & Lopez, Marina Diaz. The Cinema of Latin America. Columbia University Press, 2013.
