= Virginia Luque =

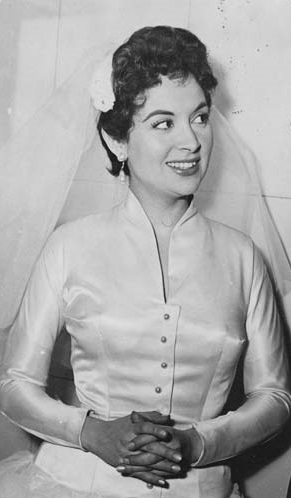
- Born: Violeta Mabel Domínguez; October 4, 1927; Buenos Aires, Argentina
- Died: June 3, 2014 (aged 86); Buenos Aires, Argentina
- Occupations: actress, singer
- Years active: 1943-1976

Virginia Luque (born Violeta Mabel Domínguez; 4 October 1927 – 3 June 2014) was an Argentine actress and singer, specialized in the musical genre of tango. She made nearly 20 appearances in tango films of Argentina between 1943 and 1976.

Born in Buenos Aires, she began her career in film in 1943 in La guerra la gano yo, later appearing in Arriba el Telón o el Patio de la Morocha (1951). She starred alongside Arturo de Córdova in La Balandra Isabel llegó esta tarde, a 1949 Venezuelan–Argentine film directed by Carlos Hugo Christensen, which entered into the 1951 Cannes Film Festival.

== Death ==
Virginia Luque died on 3 June 2014 from natural causes in her native Buenos Aires, aged 86.

== Selected filmography ==
- Back in the Seventies (1945)
- The Yacht Isabel Arrived This Afternoon (1949)
- Arriba el Telón o el Patio de la Morocha (1951)
- Del cuplé al tango (1958)
