= Llévame contigo (film) =

- Directed by: Juan Sires
- Written by: Eduardo Borrás
- Starring: Jorge Salcedo; Aída Alberti
- Edited by: Nicolás Proserpio
- Release date: 1951
- Running time: 74 minutes
- Country: Argentina
- Language: Spanish

Llévame contigo is a 1951 Argentine film directed by Juan Sires during the classical era of Argentine cinema.

== Plot ==
In an abandoned mansion, two homeless squatters witness a woman who hits her husband and leaves him for dead.

== Cast ==
- Jorge Salcedo
- Aída Alberti
- Enrique García Satur
- Guillermo Pedemonte
- Joaquín Franco
- Manuel Alcón
