= Fidel Pintos =

Argentine comedy film actor

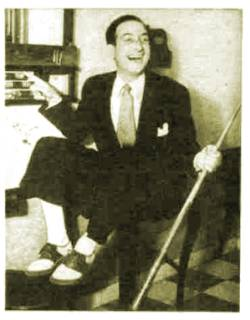
- Born: 28 August 1905; Buenos Aires, Argentina
- Died: 11 May 1974 (aged 68); Buenos Aires, Argentina
- Occupation: Actor
- Years active: 1948–1974 (film)

Fidel Pintos (August 29, 1905 – May 11, 1974) was an Argentine comedy film actor.

== Selected filmography ==
- The Bohemian Soul (1949)
- The Beautiful Brummel (1951)
- This Is My Life (1952)
- Scandal in the Family (1967)
- La Casa de Madame Lulù (1968)
- Intimacies of a Prostitute (1974)

== Bibliography ==
- Gabriele Klein. Tango in Translation. Transcript Verlag, 2009.
