= Las Píldoras =

Las pildoras
- Directed by: Enrique Cahen Salaberry
- Written by: Oscar Viale
- Based on: Comedian
- Produced by: Enrique Carreras; Nicolás Carreras
- Starring: Susana Brunetti; Dario vittori Vanessa Show
- Cinematography: Americo Hoss
- Edited by: Jorge Gárate
- Music by: Tito Ribero
- Distributed by: Argentina Sono Film
- Release date: 3 August 1972
- Running time: 83 minutes
- Country: Argentina
- Language: Spanish

Las Píldoras is a 1972 Argentine film. It is an Argentinian comedian movie written by Oscar Viale (under the pseudonym V. Rosid and adapted to the big screen by Isaac Aisemberg. It is based in the theatrical piece where the actors and actresses of the movie also represented.

== Cast ==
- Susana Brunetti
- Dario Vittori
- Santiago Bal
- Tincho Zabala
- Vanessa Show
