= Cuando los duendes cazan perdices =

- Release date: 1955
- Running time: 108 minute
- Country: Argentina
- Language: Spanish

Cuando los duendes cazan perdices is a 1955 Argentine film.
