= This is Buenos Aires =

Así es Buenos Aires
- Directed by: Emilio Vieyra
- Written by: Salvador Valverde Calvo
- Produced by: Emilio Vieyra
- Starring: Hugo Marcel
- Cinematography: Oscar Melli
- Edited by: Atilio Rinaldi
- Music by: Horacio Malviccino
- Release date: 6 May 1971
- Running time: 95 minutes
- Country: Argentina
- Language: Spanish

This is Buenos Aires (Así es Buenos Aires) is a 1971 Argentine musical film comedy directed by Emilio Vieyra and written by Salvador Valverde Calvo. The film starred Hugo Marcel and Víctor Bó. The tango film was premièred in Argentina on May 6, 1971.

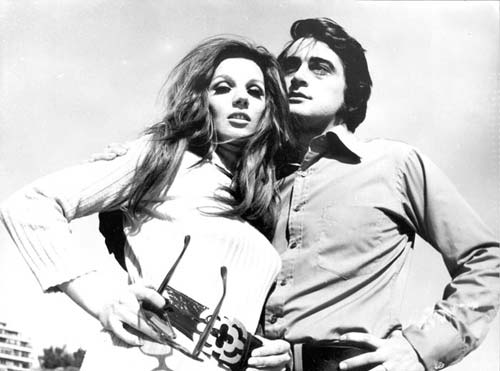

== Cast ==
- Hugo Marcel
- Soledad Silveyra
- Ricardo Bauleo
- Víctor Bó
- Nelly Panizza
- Walter Kliche
- Adriana Hope
- Lucio Deval
- Gloria Prat
- Esther Velázquez
- Susana Giménez
- Silvio Soldán as Narrator (voice)
- Alfredo Suárez
- Juan Manuel Tenuta
