= Susana Rinaldi =

Argentine tango singer (born 1935)

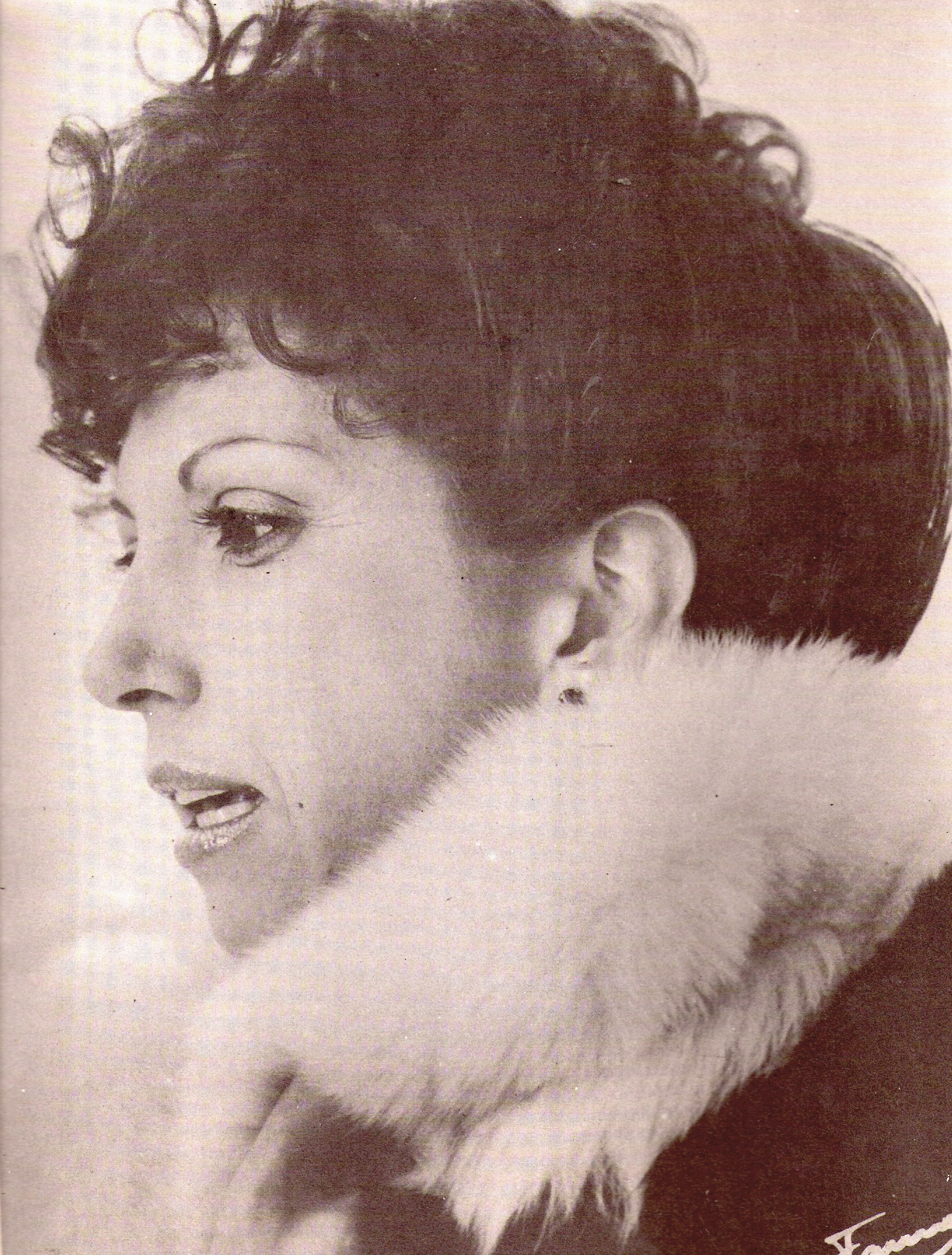
- Born: Susana Natividad Rinaldi; December 25, 1935 (age 90); Buenos Aires, Argentina
- Other name: La Tana
- Occupation: Tango singer
- Years active: Since 1957
- Spouse: Osvaldo Piro
- Children: 2

Susana Natividad Rinaldi was born on December 25, 1935, in Buenos Aires, Argentina. She is an Argentine tango singer better known as "La Tana." Her recognition is notable in various films, television appearances, theatrical performances, and in the music industry.

== Biography ==
Susana Natividad Rinaldi was born to a wealthy father and a poor mother in Buenos Aires in 1935. Dubbed "La Tana" (in reference to her Italian origins), she spent her childhood moving throughout different provinces of Argentina. She began studying chamber singing at the National Conservatory of Music at age 14, and in 1955 she entered the School of Dramatic Art. Two years later, she made her television debut and in 1959 debuted in a major theater production. When she was asked to record a poetry concert in 1966 she offered them a tango album, and by the end of that year her first album, with music arranged by bandoneón virtuoso Roberto Pansera, was released.

As her success as a singer grew, she had to let go of the actress world, although she did appear in a couple films and theatrical performances during her singing career. After touring Argentine tango bars and milongas, Rinaldi gained fame as a singer during the late 1960s. She called the attention of her audience by singing tangos which up to then had only been sung by men, including standards by José María Contursi, Enrique Santos Discépolo, Homero Manzi, and Cátulo Castillo. This gave her a deserved reputation among a new audience made up mostly of young university students. She achieved fame when she incorporated into her repertoire songs by new authors, such as Eladia Blázquez, Osvaldo Avena, Héctor Negro, and Chico Novarro.

She and her husband, bandoneón virtuoso Osvaldo Piro, established Magoya, a café concert in seaside Mar del Plata, in 1971. Following the March 1976 coup, however, Rinaldi was forced to leave the country. After a long stay in Paris, she returned to Argentina in 1989 with an innovative idea of a tango-show. Due to this, she was again rejected by traditional tango listeners, although she did become one of the main figures in the tango renewal movement of the time. Since then, she has lived in Paris to establish her career as a singer, making her an icon of international tango.

An artist with a political conscience, she supported her ideals through music in international concert tours and as UNESCO Goodwill Ambassador since 1992. Her tireless defense of human rights and her passionate promotion of a more just and peaceful world earned her the title of Illustrious Citizen of Buenos Aires in 1990. Other distinctions earned during her lengthy career include the SADAIC Grand Prize in 1969 and 1999; and the Konex Award in 1985, 2001, and 2005.
