= Guillermo Roux =

Argentine painter (1929–2021)

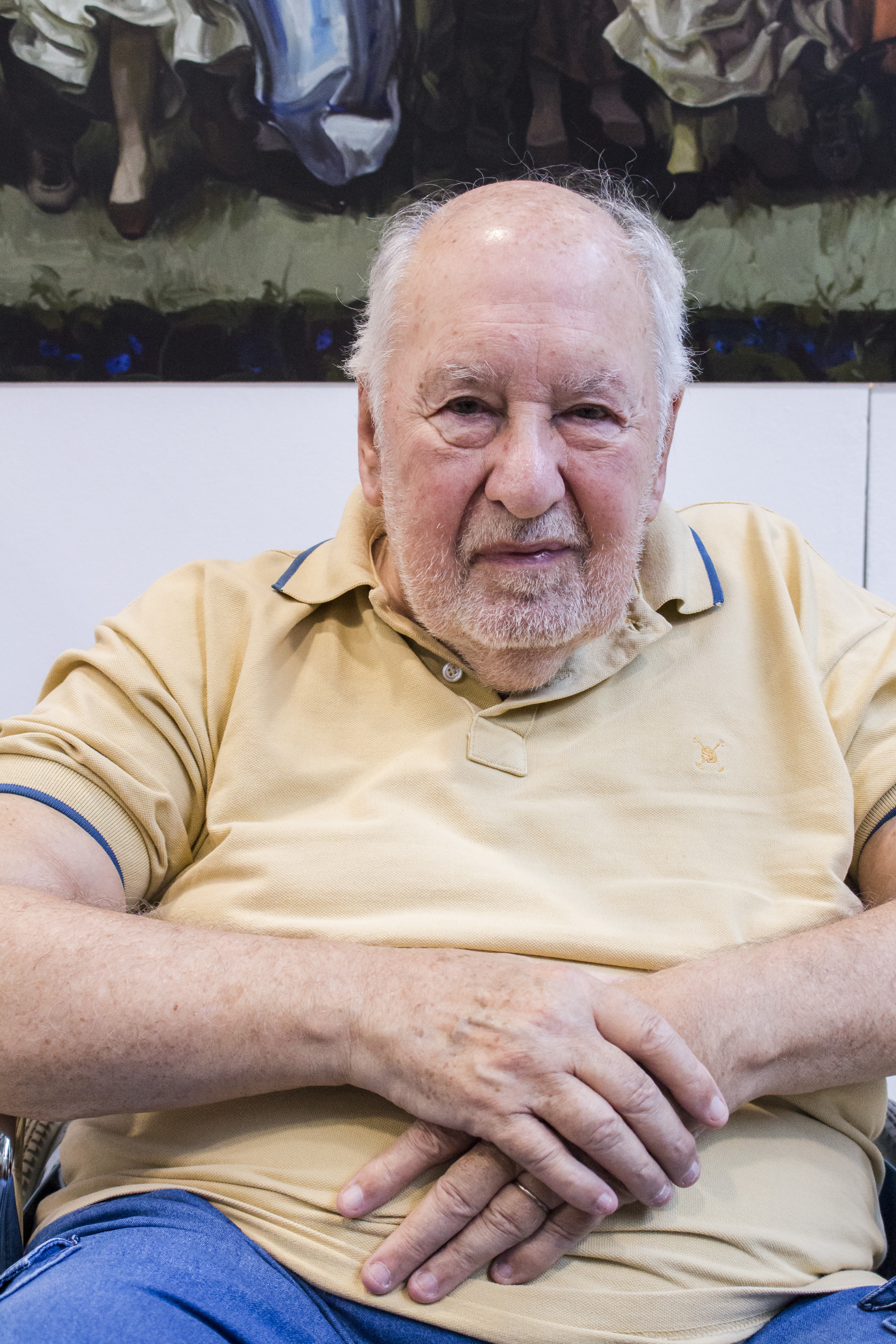
Roux in 2018

Guillermo Roux (17 September 1929 – 28 November 2021) was an Argentine painter known for his watercolors, collages, and frescoes.

Roux was born in Buenos Aires, Argentina, in September 1929. His father, Raúl Roux, was a well-known Uruguayan painter. He studied in the Buenos Aires School of Fine Arts until 1948, and in 1956 he travelled to Rome. There, Roux worked in Umberto Nonni's bottega as an assistant in restoration and decoration projects. He returned to Argentina in 1960, and relocated to Jujuy Province, where he taught art and continued to paint.

He lived in New York City, where he worked as an illustrator and an painter, from 1966 to 1967, and returned to Buenos Aires. He traveled extensively, exhibiting in Berlin, London, Munich, Paris, and Sicily, and in 1975, he earned his first international prize at the XIII São Paulo Art Biennial. This was followed by, among other honors, the Konex Award (the highest prize in the Argentine cultural realm), in 1982. Roux's work was added to the prestigious Phillips Collection in Washington, DC, in 1988, and he contributed one of four new frescoes that were added to the cupola of the shopping arcade, Galerías Pacífico, when it was reopened in 1991.

Roux created his own teaching workshop in 1997; his themes include still life, harlequins, Italian actors and geometric shapes; they are often surrealistic. He was named Illustrious Citizen of Buenos Aires in 2007.

He died on 28 November 2021, at the age of 92.
