= Vida nocturna =

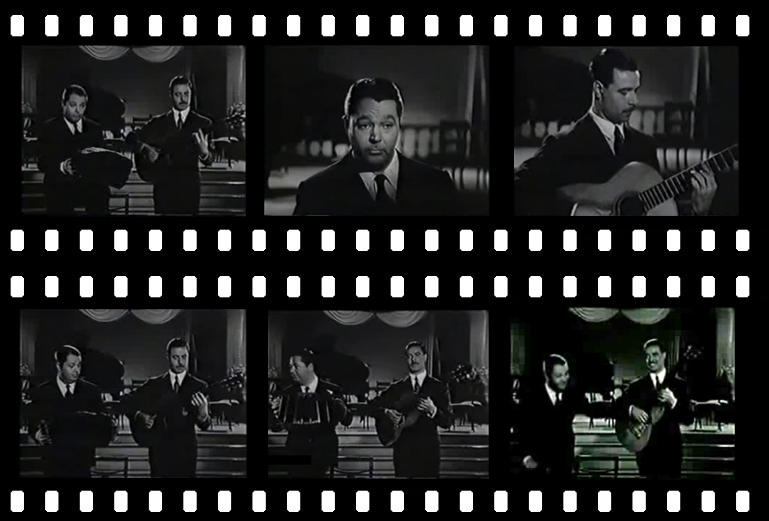
- Directed by: Leo Fleider
- Release date: 1955
- Country: Argentina
- Language: Spanish

Vida nocturna is a 1955 Argentine film.
