= Leo Fleider =

Argentine film director

Leo Fleider (October 12, 1913 in Hermanowa, Poland – August 5, 1977 in Buenos Aires, Argentina) was a Polish-born Argentine film director and screenwriter, notable for his work during the classical era of Argentine cinema.

== Career ==
He directed some 30 films between the early 1950s and 1974 such as Amor a primera vista (1956), Aconcagua (1964) and Arriba juventud (1971).

== Filmography ==
- The Prodigal Woman (1945) (with Mario Soffici and Ralph Pappier)
- Sombras en la frontera (1951)
- Locuras, tiros y mambos (1951)
- Los sobrinos del Zorro (1952)
- La Muerte en las calles (1952)
- Trompada 45 (1953)
- La Casa grande (1953)
- Desalmados en pena (1954)
- Torrente indiano (1954)
- Los Hermanos corsos (1955)
- Vida nocturna (1955)
- Novia para dos (1956)
- Amor a primera vista (1956)
- Campo arado (1959)
- Interpol llamando a Río (1961)
- Canuto Cañete, conscripto del 7 (1963)
- Aconcagua (1964)
- Canuto Cañete y los 40 ladrones (1964)
- Canuto Cañete, detective privado (1965)
- Ahorro y préstamo... para el amor (1965)
- Vivir es formidable (1966)
- Escala musical (1966)
- El derecho de comer (1968)
- Los debutantes en el amor (1969)
- Cautiva en la selva (1969)
- Muchacho (1970)
- Arriba Juventud (1971)
- Siempre te amaré (1971)
- Embrujo de amor (1971)
- Piloto de pruebas (1972)
- Destino de un capricho (1972)
- Titanes en el ring (1973)
- Crimen en el hotel alojamiento (1974)
- Esta es mi Argentina (1974)
- Operación rosa rosa (1974)
