= Néstor Fabián =

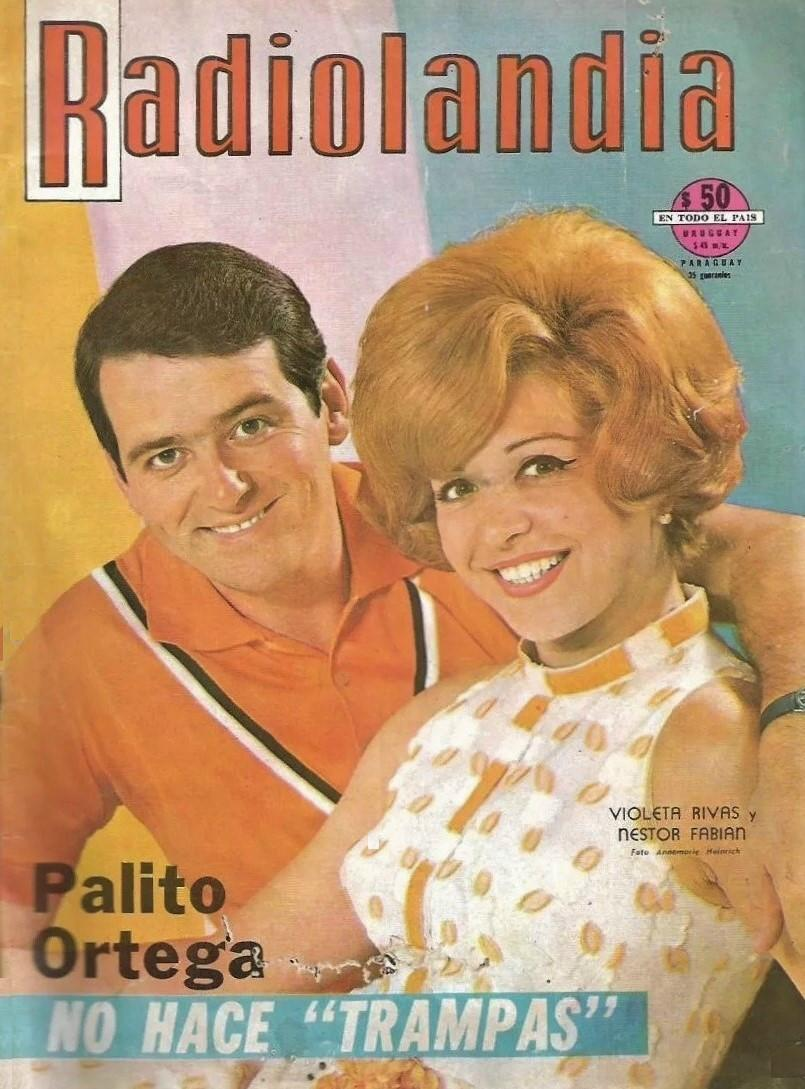
- Néstor Fabián and his wife Violeta Rivas (1969)

Background information
- Born: José Cotelo; 30 November 1938; Buenos Aires, Argentina
- Origin: Buenos Aires, Argentina
- Genre: Tango
- Occupations: Singer, actor
- Label: EMI-Odeon

Néstor Fabián (born 30 November 1938 in Buenos Aires, Argentina), is an Argentine tango singer and actor. Having lost his biological family, he was adopted. At the age of twelve, he started working at a shoes factory to help his adoptive family.

In 1961, he made his breakthrough as a singer in a t.v. program at Channel 7, Argentina named "Luces de Buenos Aires" (Buenos Aires´lights). He sang a bolero with Mariano Moreno´s orchestra. He also takes part in a t.v. show called "El Show de Cap".

He has acted in several musical comedies at Astral Theatre in Buenos Aires, Argentina and has recorded several LPs.

In 1964, he starred a soap opera in Argentina named "Todo es amor" ("Love is everything") with Violeta Rivas whom he married in March 1967. They have a daughter.

Néstor Fabián toured Russia in 1974. In 1988, he made some concerts in Spain and Portugal.

At the moment (May 2013) he is living in Buenos Aires and continues singing tango songs.

== Discography ==
"Afectuosamente" (1963)

"Tangos para la juventud" (1964)

"Amor y casamiento" (1964)

"Yo canto tangos" (1965)

"De milonga... con Néstor Fabián" (1965)

"Tango"

"El muchacho de Buenos Aires"

"Frente a la facultad" (1976)

"Contame una historia" (1977)

"Tango triste"

"Charlemos"

== Musical comedies ==
"Buenos Aires de seda y percal"

"Buenas Noches, Buenos Aires"

== Television programs ==
"Luces de Buenos Aires" (1961)

"El show de Cap" (1961)

"Todo es Amor" (1964)

"Sábados Continuados" (1964)

== Filmography ==
Balada para un mochilero (1971)

Pasión dominguera(1970)

¡Viva la vida!(1969)

Los muchachos de antes no usaban gomina(1969)

Viaje de una noche de verano(1965)

Buenas noches, Buenos Aires(1964)
