= Las apariencias engañan (1958 film) =

1958 film

- Lobby card
- Directed by: Carlos Rinaldi
- Written by: Carlos A. Petit
- Starring: Perla Alvarado; Ana Arneodo
- Cinematography: Humberto Peruzzi
- Release date: 1958
- Running time: 104 minutes
- Country: Argentina
- Language: Spanish

Las apariencias engañan (Appearances can be deceiving in English) is a 1958 Argentinean romantic comedy film directed by Carlos Rinaldi and written by Carlos A. Petit, based on the novel by Rafael Maluenda.

== Cast ==
- Perla Alvarado
- Ana Arneodo
- Alberto Bello
- Cristina Berys
- Patricia Castell
- Benito Cibrián
- Florindo Ferrario
- Enrique García Satur
- Amadeo Novoa
- Adolfo Stray
