= Carlos Rinaldi =

Argentine film director, film editor and screenwriter

- Born: February 5, 1915; Buenos Aires, Argentina
- Died: 1995 (aged 79–80); Buenos Aires, Argentina
- Occupation: Film director
- Years active: 1937-1980

Carlos Rinaldi (February 5, 1915 – 1995) was an Argentine film director of the classical era of Argentine cinema and beyond. He began his career in 1937 with Argentina Sono Film, working in editing. Subsequently, he joined Associated Argentine Artists, where he was responsible for the editing of the company's entire production, earning recognition as the leading editor of his time. Rinaldi made his directorial debut with La cuna vacía in 1949 and directed numerous films until 1980.

== Filmography ==
Rinaldi directed the following films:

- La cuna vacía (1949)
- Fantasmas asustados (1951)
- El baldío (1952)
- La patrulla chiflada (1952)
- Vigilantes y ladrones (1952)
- Del otro lado del puente (1953)
- Un hombre cualquiera (1954)
- Casada y señorita (1954)
- Pobre pero honrado (1955)
- El millonario (1955)
- África ríe (1956)
- Todo sea para bien (1957)
- Las apariencias engañan (1958)
- Salitre (1959)
- Yo quiero vivir contigo (1960)
- Male and Female Since Adam and Eve (1961)
- El desastrólogo (1964)
- Viaje de una noche de verano (1965)
- Bicho raro (1965)
- Pimienta (1966)
- ¡Al diablo con este cura! (1967)
- El Derecho a la felicidad (1968)
- Maternidad sin hombres (1968)
- Pimienta y pimentón (1970)
- Balada para un mochilero (1971)
- Mi amigo Luis (1972)
- Adiós Alejandra (1973)
- Andrea (1973)
- No apto para menores (1979)
- Alerta en azul (1980)
- El diablo metió la pata (1980)
