= Persona honrada se necesita =

- Directed by: Francisco Múgica
- Written by: Carlos A. Olivari, Sixto Pondal Ríos
- Starring: Francisco Petrone, Alicia Vignoli, Marcelo Ruggero
- Cinematography: José María Beltrán
- Edited by: Juan Soffici
- Music by: Enrique Delfino
- Production company: Lumiton
- Release date: 13 August 1941
- Running time: 77 minutes
- Country: Argentina
- Language: Spanish

Persona honrada se necesita (Honest Person Needed) is a 1941 Argentine comedy film of the Golden Age of Argentine cinema, directed by Francisco Múgica and starring Francisco Petrone, Alicia Vignoli and Marcelo Ruggero.

== Production ==
The 77 minute black and white comedy was directed for Lumiton by Francisco Múgica, written by Carlos A. Olivari and Sixto Pondal Ríos. It was released in Argentina on 13 August 1941. The film starred Francisco Petrone, Alicia Vignoli and Marcelo Ruggero. This was the third film directed by Múgica in 1941, after El mejor papá del mundo and Los martes, orquídeas. It was designed as a vehicle for Francisco Petrone.

== Synopsis ==
The leader of a gang of thieves (Francisco Petrone) is on the run from the police. He wins the lottery, and needs someone honest to collect the prize for him. He has diverse underworld friends, but none can be trusted. Given the risk of being sent to prison for perhaps fifty years, the honest person must be very, very special. He finally finds the woman he needs living in a boarding house. Alicia Vignoli answers his want ad, which gives the film's title. She is wide-eyed and innocent, and does not realize she is being hired by a crook. Petrone falls in love, and decides to become honest himself.

== Reception ==
The film was well-received, described as a good-humored comedy.

== Cast ==
The cast includes:

- Francisco Petrone
- Alicia Vignoli
- Marcelo Ruggero
- Pedro Maratea
- Edna Norrell
- Rosa Catá
- Carlos Morganti
- Alberto Terrones
- José Ruzzo
- Eliseo Herrero
- Pedro Bibe
- Alfredo Fornaresio
- René Pocoví
- Salvador Sinaí
