= Adolescencia =

1942 film directed by Francisco Múgica

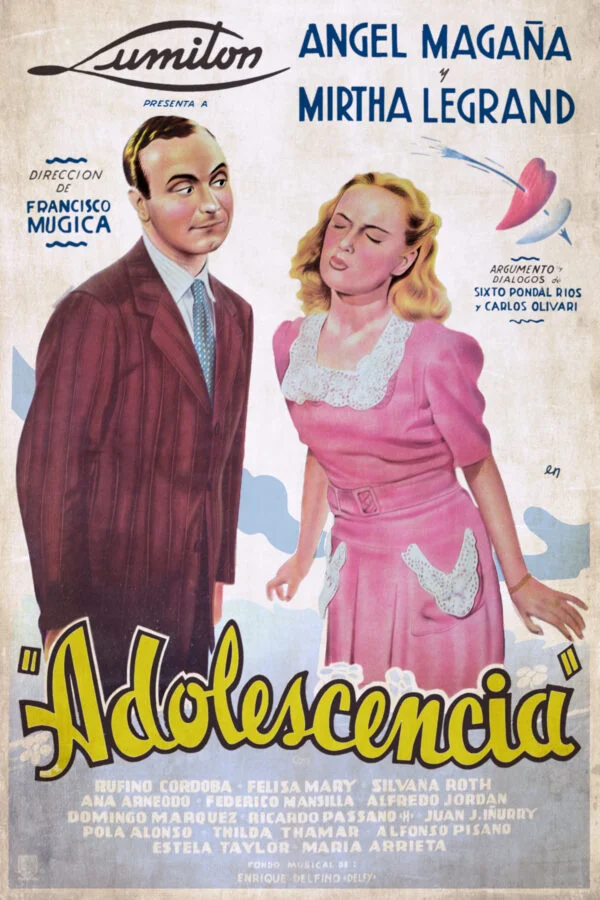
- Theatrical release poster
- Directed by: Francisco Múgica
- Written by: Carlos A. Olivari
- Produced by: Francisco Múgica
- Starring: Pola Alonso; Ana Arneodo
- Cinematography: José María Beltrán
- Edited by: Juan Soffici
- Music by: Enrique Delfino
- Distributed by: Lumiton
- Release date: 11 March 1942
- Running time: 86 minutes
- Country: Argentina
- Language: Spanish

Adolescencia (English language: Adolescence) is a 1942 Argentine film of the Golden Age of Argentine cinema, directed by Francisco Múgica and written by Carlos A. Olivari. The film starred Pola Alonso and Ana Arneodo.

== Synopsis ==
A girl falls in love with a boy arrived from the United States and displaces her childhood sweetheart.

== Release ==
The film premiered on 11 March 1942 in Buenos Aires.

== Cast ==
- Pola Alonso
- Ana Arneodo
- María Arrieta
- Alberto Contreras
- Rufino Córdoba
- Alfredo Jordan
- Mirtha Legrand
- Ángel Magaña
- Federico Mansilla
- Domingo Márquez
