= Sabina Olmos =

Argentine film actress

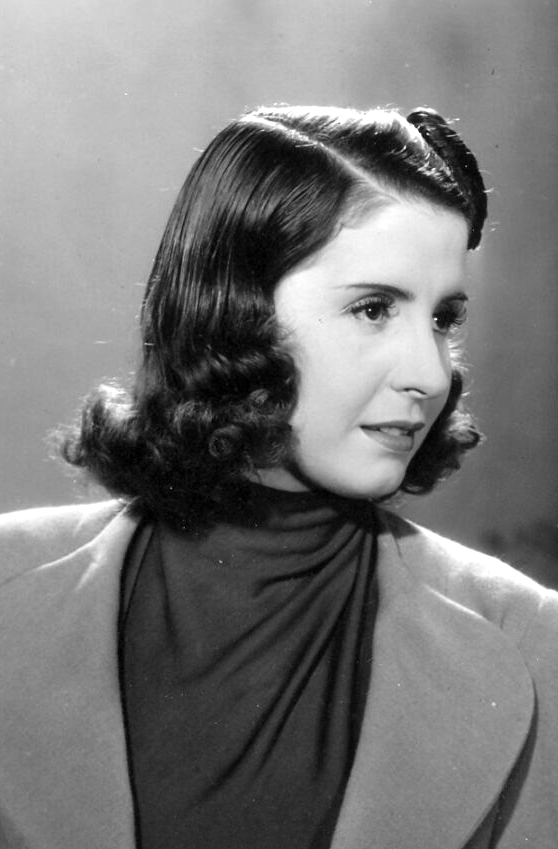
- Olmos in Mujeres que trabajan (1938)
- Born: Rosa Herminia Gómez Ramos; 4 February 1913; Buenos Aires, Argentina
- Died: 14 January 1999 (aged 85); Buenos Aires, Argentina
- Occupation: Actress
- Years active: 1934–1992

Rosa Herminia Gómez Ramos (1913–1999), known by the stage name of Sabina Olmos, was an Argentine film actress of the Golden Age of Argentine cinema.

She began her career as a radio singer of folklore and tango. Later, she developed a long film career with Lumiton studies, where she made a series of films directed by Manuel Romero and Francisco Mugica, like La rubia del camino, Mujeres que trabajan and La vida es un tango. "Felicia", her role in the 1939 film Así es la vida created a genre known as "Argentine suffering" throughout Latin America, because all the characters were either suffering severe angst or crying in equal measure throughout the films. In the 1940s, she participated in several dramatic roles, particularly Historia de una noche, La gata, Albéniz and Tierra del Fuego, which earned her Best Actress and Best Supporting Actress awards.

After the Liberating Revolution, Olmos and her husband, tango singer Charlo, were exiled from Argentina and toured throughout America and Spain. When she was able to finally return in the 1960s, the caliber of roles offered, such as the failure Pesadilla and second tier films and television, created economic problems for the actress. She took work as an artistic adviser to Channel 11 and served in several administrative functions. In 1992 she performed at the Teatro de la Ribera with other stars from her era at the request of Rodolfo Graziano, though no work materialized from the project.

Olmos died in 1999 at the age of 85.

== Early life ==
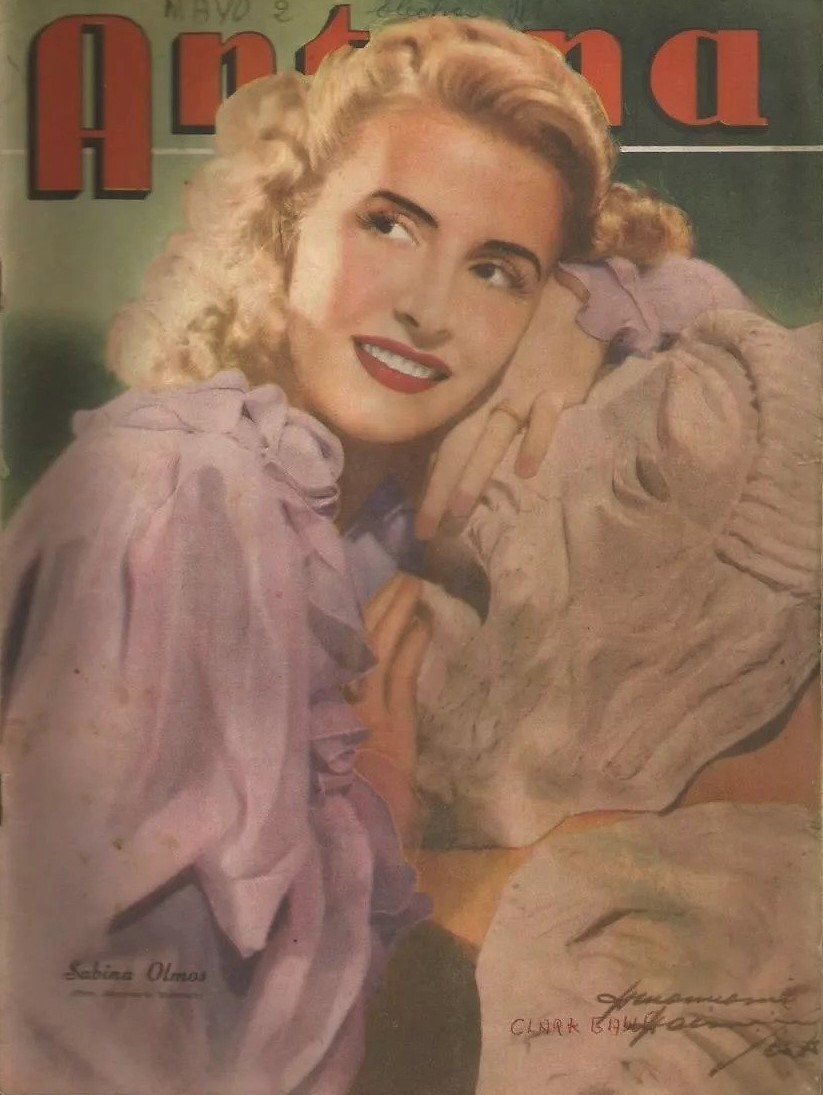
Sabina Olmos by Annemarie Heinrich (1949)

Rosa Herminia Gómez Ramos was born on 3 February 1913 in the Balvanera neighborhood of Buenos Aires, Argentina to Rafael Gómez and Rafaela Ramos. From a young age, she was particularly interested in singing, participating in school events and festivals.

== Career ==
At the age of 21, she was working in a hat shop called Casa San Juan, as a model, when she was presented to Amanda Ledesma who was managing a show on Radio Buenos Aires. They offered her a job singing folksongs as there were so many tango singers. She learned folk songs from the brothers Carlos and Manuel Acosta Villafañe and as her repertoire grew, she switched to Radio Splendid. There she took the name "Sabina Olmos" and began singing at various radio stations, including Radio El Mundo, one of the most important stations of the era, Radio Argentina, Radio Municipal, Radio Carve and others, adding tangos to her performances.

She began working in movies in 1937 when she was hired to sing in the film, El Casamiento de Chichilo directed by Isidoro Navarro and starring Francisco Charmiello. Her second film was La rubia del camino by Manuel Romero, starring Paulina Singerman, in which Olmos both acted and sang, and a few months later, she was hired for another Romero film, Mujeres que trabajan. She made two other films in 1938, Los apuros de Claudina and La vida es un tango, which was her first major success and in which she sang four songs “Mi noche triste”, “Milonguita”, “La morocha” and “Pero hay una melena” and duets with Hugo del Carril: “La payanca”, “No me vengas con paradas” and in the final scene “Aquel tapado de armiño”. This success led to her break-through role in Así es la vida (1939) in which she co-starred with Enrique Muiño by Francisco Mugica for which she won an award instituted by the Municipal Museum of Cinema as best dramatic actress. The film became a classic of Argentine theater and introduced the role of the suffering heroine which was duplicated many times thereafter.

A couple of hit comedies, Casamiento en Buenos Aires and Divorcio en Montevideo, with Niní Marshall and Enrique Serrano followed and then a role for which she is always remembered in Carnaval de antaño (1940). On the set of the film, she met the tango singer Carlos José Pérez de la Riestra, known as Charlo, who would become her husband until 1969 and she uttered the line, "Ya no soy tu Margarita, ahora me llaman Margot" ("I am not your Margarita, now you will call me Margot"). Some of her most memorable works were done in the 1940s, including Historia de una noche (1941) for which she won the award for best performance in an ensemble, Albéniz (1946), which won a Silver Condor Award for Best Film, La gata for which she won Best Supporting Actress from the Argentine Academy of Cinematography Arts and Sciences and Tierra del Fuego, for which she won a Silver Condor Award for Best Actress and a Best Supporting Actress from the Argentine Academy of Cinematography Arts and Sciences. Her last memorable film in this period was Historia del 900 (1949) under the direction of Hugo del Carril with whom she also starred.

As the Perónist Government began to fail, she and her husband made long trips outside Argentina and moved away from films. After the fall of Perón, Olmos and Charlo were exiled and lived outside Argentina, performing in Spain and Latin America. They lived in Spain for two years recording separately and together and also made some records in Colombia and Brazil. In all, they recorded twelve discs and five duets including such songs as “Amor de mis amores”, “Cuando cuentes la historia de tu vida”, “Lluvia sobre el mar”, “Pobre negra”, “Patio mío”, “La barranca”, “Sin ella” and “Poema de la despedida”, but she was not considered one of the great singers of the era and her recordings were looked at as novelties. They decided to return to Argentina in 1962 and Charlo produced the film Pesadilla (1963), in which she starred. The movie was an overwhelming failure at the box office and within a few years, the marriage also failed.

Her career went into decline and despite a few appearances, Bettina (1964), Intimidades de una cualquiera (1974) and an appearance in the theatrical performance of "Hoy, ensayo, hoy" which she was invited to participate in by Rodolfo Graziano, her career did not revive. She even attempted a couple of soap operas, “Simplemente María” and “Estación Retiro”, but neither were memorable. Olmos began working at Channel 11 as an administrative employee in 1973 and continued for the next 15 years. She had one final appearance, in the film Siempre es difícil volver a casa (1992).

== Death ==
Towards the end of her life, she grew increasingly isolated, as she had no siblings or children and was rarely visited by old friends.

She died on 14 January 1999 in Buenos Aires at the age of 85. The cause of death was suicide.

== Filmography ==
- El Casamiento de Chichilo (1937)
- La rubia del camino (1938)
- Mujeres que trabajan (1938)
- Los apuros de Claudina (1938)
- La vida es un tango (1938)
- Así es la vida (1939)
- Casamiento en Buenos Aires (1939)
- Divorcio en Montevideo (1939)
- Los muchachos se divierten (1940)
- Carnaval de antaño (1940)
- Boina blanca (1941)
- Historia de una noche (1941)
- I Want to Be a Chorus Girl (1941)
- Pasión imposible (1942)
- Eramos seis (1945)
- Albéniz (1946)
- La gata (1947)
- Tierra del Fuego (1948)
- Una historia del 900 (1949)
- La barca sin pescador (1949)
- Bettina (1963)
- Pesadilla (1963)
- Hipólito y Evita (1973)
- Intimidades de una cualquiera (1973)
- Siempre es difícil volver a casa (1992)
