= The Journey (1942 film) =

El Viaje
- Directed by: Francisco Múgica
- Written by: Francisco Múgica; Carlos A. Olivari; Francisco Oyarzábal; Sixto Pondal Ríos
- Starring: Mirtha Legrand; Roberto Airaldi
- Cinematography: Alfredo Traverso
- Edited by: Antonio Rampoldi
- Music by: Juan Ehlert; Jean Gilbert
- Release date: 1942
- Running time: 1 hour 23 minutes
- Country: Argentina
- Language: Spanish

The Journey (Spanish: El viaje) is a 1942 Argentine film directed by Francisco Múgica during the Golden Age of Argentine cinema.

== Plot ==
The film tells the story of a young engineer (Roberto Airaldi) from Buenos Aires who met a girl (Mirtha Legrand) at Córdoba Province falling in love with her; but her mother (Ana Arneodo) and her sisters (Aída Luz, Silvana Roth) don't agree with their feelings and they do all that they can for separate them, but at the end he discover why.

== Cast ==
- Mirtha Legrand as Alicia Castro
- Roberto Airaldi as Ing. Julio Aráoz
- Silvana Roth as Mecha Castro
- Ana Arneodo as Doña Mercedes de Castro
- Aída Luz Nora Castro
- Tito Gómez as Pirucho
