= Hilda Sour =

Chilean actress and singer

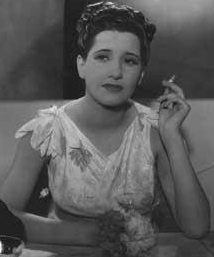
Hilda Sour

Hilda Sour (1915 – June 6, 2003) was a Chilean actress and singer, who had an extensive career in Argentina and Mexico.

== Biography ==
Born in Chile, Sour began to work professionally at age seven. She made a career on screen and in the theater, mainly portraying antagonists. during the Argentine film golden decade. Sour worked with Pedro Laxalt, María Félix, Carlos Gardel, Olinda Bozán, Ben Ami, Imperio Argentina, Maricarmen, Mauritz Walsh, Luis Arata, Elsa del Campillo, Agustín Lara, Niní Marshall, Alicia Barrié, Pepita Serrador, María Duval, Elisa Labardén, Blanquita Orgaz, Roberto García Ramos, Eva Duarte, Marga López, and Silvana Roth. She worked in the first Chilean film with sound, Norte y sur, directed by Jorge Delano, and alongside Alejandro Flores and Guillermo Yánquez. On stage, she worked with Olga Fariña, Rebequita Gallardo, and Jorge Princesses. Sour died in Chile in 2003.

== Filmography ==
- 1934: Norte y sur
- 1938: Mujeres que trabajan
- 1938: Jettatore
- 1939: Divorcio en Montevideo
- 1939: El solterón
- 1939: Margarita, Armando y su padre
- 1939: Retazo
- 1940: Casamiento en Buenos Aires
- 1941: Soñar no cuesta nada
- 1942: Amor último modelo
- 1943: La juventud manda
- 1943: Las sorpresas del divorcio
- 1948: Señora tentación
- 1948: Nocturne of Love
- 1949: Callejera como Luisa
- 1950: Mujeres en mi vida
- 1950: Cuide a su marido
- 1951: One Who's Been a Sailor
- 1968: Chau amor
- 1971: El afuerino
