= Kilómetro 111 =

- Directed by: Mario Soffici
- Written by: Enrique Amorim, Carlos A. Olivari, Sixto Pondal Ríos, Mario Soffici
- Starring: Pepe Arias, Delia Garcés
- Cinematography: Antonio Merayo
- Edited by: Nicolás Proserpio
- Music by: Rodolfo Sciammarella
- Distributed by: Argentina Sono Film
- Release date: 1938
- Running time: 103 minutes
- Country: Argentina
- Language: Spanish

Kilómetro 111 is a 1938 Argentine musical film drama directed by Mario Soffici. The film premiered in Buenos Aires during the Golden Age of Argentine cinema.

This is one of several films directed by Soffici which address the social evils of historical Argentina. The film is based on Carlos Olivari's play La tercera invasion inglesa (1936), which is a fictional semi-documentary of the British railroad monopoly. The film is set in a town in central Argentina and documents the tragedy of the poverty-stricken rural farmers who are forced to sell their harvest to the railroad developers. In an attempt to avoid being exploited, the farmers send their wheat to Buenos Aires, where they fail to obtain a bank loan. In the end, it is down to the generosity of the station master that they are able to use the new line to transport their goods, although his generosity means that he is fired from his job.

In a survey of the 100 greatest films of Argentine cinema carried out by the Museo del Cine Pablo Ducrós Hicken in 2000, the film reached the 33rd position.

== Cast ==
- Pepe Arias
- Delia Garcés
- José Olarra
- Ángel Magaña
- Miguel Gómez Bao
- Juan Bono
- Inés Edmonson
- Adolfo Meyer
- Choly Mur
- Héctor Méndez
- Julio Renato
- Alberto Terrones
- Robert Colléy as Wisecracking Terrorist #2
- Cirilo Etulain
- Arturo Podestá
