= Pirí Lugones =

- Born: Susana Lugones Aguirre; 30 April 1925; Buenos Aires, Argentina
- Died: 17 February 1978 (aged 52)
- Education: University of Buenos Aires
- Occupations: Journalist, writer, editor, translator
- Spouse: Carlos Peralta (div. 1958)
- Children: 3
- Relatives: Julián Aguirre (grandfather); Leopoldo Lugones (grandfather)

Pirí Lugones (nickname of Susana Lugones Aguirre; 30 April 1925 – 17 February 1978) was an Argentine journalist, writer, editor, and translator. In December 1977, she was disappeared and subsequently killed by "task groups" of the military dictatorship that ruled the country from 1976 to 1983.

== Biography ==
Pirí Lugones was born in Buenos Aires on 30 April 1925, the daughter of Leopoldo Lugones, son of the poet of the same name, and Carmen Aguirre, daughter of renowned pianist and composer Julián Aguirre. She had an older sister, Carmen, nicknamed Babú.

Her father, nicknamed Polo, was infamous for having developed the picana, an electrical torture device, during the de facto government of General José Félix Uriburu. Pirí, for her part, always had a completely different ideology. It led her to join the ranks of the political left, to be considered "subversive", and later disappeared by the military government of the self-styled National Reorganization Process. She used to introduce herself as "Pirí Lugones, granddaughter of the poet, daughter of the torturer."

She worked as a teacher, and later entered the Faculty of Philosophy and Letters of the University of Buenos Aires to study writing. There she met her future husband, with whom she would have three children, Carlos Peralta. In 1958, they separated.

As a writer and editor for Ediciones de la Flor, she compiled the anthology El libro de los autores in 1967, and translated letters of Dylan Thomas into Spanish, making use of a Buenos Aires form of Lunfardo.

During the 1970s, she joined the Peronist Armed Forces and, later, the Montoneros, adopting the nom de guerre Rosita. Her missions consisted mainly of intelligence, press, and charity work. She was friends with other militants, such as Paco Urondo, Juan Gelman, Lili Massaferro, Jorge Cedrón, and Rodolfo Walsh (with whom she lived for a time in Tigre).

She was abducted by a Navy "task group" on 24 December 1977. According to journalist Horacio Verbitsky, she was held in concentration camps known as El Atlético and El Banco, and harshly interrogated, at one point taunting her captors, "I'm the daughter of the torturer Lugones, who invented everything that you're doing."

Although the exact date of her murder is unknown, accounts of fellow detainees indicate that it coincided with a massive transfer of prisoners on 17 February 1978, after which nothing was heard of her.
