= Lili Massaferro =

- Born: Lidia Ángela Massaferro; 23 November 1926; Buenos Aires, Argentina
- Died: 26 April 2001 (aged 74); Buenos Aires, Argentina
- Other name: Lili Gacel
- Occupations: Actress, writer
- Children: Liliana Belloni; Manuel Belloni

Lidia Ángela "Lili" Massaferro (23 November 1926 – 26 April 2001) was an Argentine actress and Montonero militant.

== Biography ==
In the mid-1940s, Lili Massaferro studied Philosophy and Literature. She married very young to free herself from her father. However, for almost 50 years she lived in her second paternal home, at 400 Conesa Street. She had four children, two with Manuel Belloni – Manuel and Liliana – and two with Marcelo Laferrere (son of the playwright and politician Gregorio de Laferrère). She worked in public relations, responsible for getting advertisers for Gente magazine.

Under the pseudonym Lili Gacel, she was the protagonist of advertisements for Arizona cigarettes, and acted in several films in the late 1950s (such as The House of the Angel, based on a novel by Beatriz Guido, who was one of her acquaintances at the time). She came to hate that experience in the world of entertainment.

She formed a trio of inseparable friends with Julia Constenla and Pirí Lugones, the latter of whom would be assassinated in 1978.

=== Personal life ===
Among her circle of male friends and "suitors" were Bobby Aizemberg, Hector Álvarez Murena, Fernando Birri, Adolfo Bioy Casares, Jorge Luis Borges, Miguel Brascó, Carlos Burone, Leopoldo Torre Nilsson, and Oski.

== Son's killing ==
In the late 1960s, Massaferro's son Manuel "Manolito" Belloni became a soldier in the Peronist Armed Forces (FAP). Pipo Lernoud recalls that moment because of the great discussion he had with Manolo when he was going to Europe in 1969, who told him, "you will not see me anymore because I am going to go underground," to which Lernoud replied, "you are crazy; you do not know whom you are going to kill, for whom you are going to die."

On 8 March 1971, the Tigre police killed Manolo (age 23), his last words reportedly being the cry "Viva Perón!" He left behind his wife Valentina Nina Onetto (born 1947) with a daughter, María (born 1969), and pregnant with her daughter Victoria (born 1971), who is currently an actress. From that moment on, Lili Massaferro became a member of the Revolutionary Armed Forces (FAR) and, after a brief political career, became a political leader at age 44. Known as "La Pepa", she ended up being the general secretary of the women's branch of the Montonero Peronist Movement.

== Arrest ==
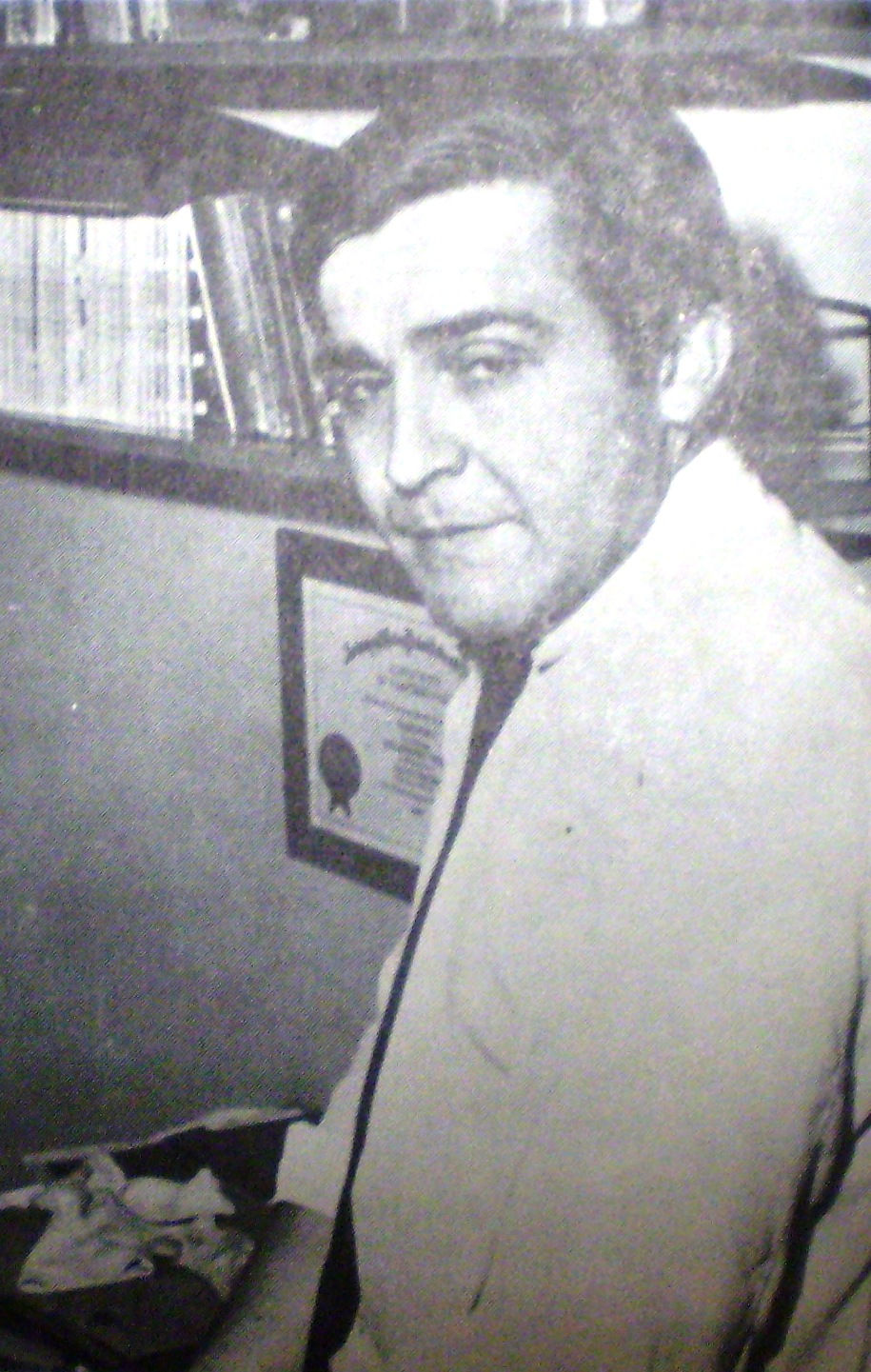
The poet and journalist Francisco "Paco" Urondo (1930–1976)

Because of her militancy, Massaferro had to go underground, and was forced to leave behind her two children with Laferrere. On 14 February 1973, she was arrested at Ingeniero Maschwitz along with Juan Julio Roqué, Paco Urondo, and Alicia Rabboy.

== "Freedom to the combatants" ==
Three months later she regained her freedom thanks to the presidential amnesty of Héctor José Cámpora. To celebrate – still dressed in her prison uniform, and with her lawyers Rodolfo Ortega Peña and Eduardo Luis Duhalde – she went to eat a puchero at the restaurant El Tropezón.

That same year (1973) she was the organizer of the Agrupación Evita of the women's branch of the Montoneros. In 1974 she was invited by General Omar Torrijos to visit Panama and learn about the Panamanian revolutionary process.

We are the last ones to try to judge Lili Massaferro, but we know of her militant comrades who did not feel very comfortable when a "lady of her house" recently arrived in politics who – before any decision or conclusion that was not to her liking – threw the body of her son in their faces.

— Alejandro Piscitelli

In 1972 Massaferro began a partnership with the journalist and militant Francisco "Paco" Urondo. When he left her, Lili denounced him before the Montonero leadership – of strong Catholic and nationalist origins – as being degraded "by bourgeois deviations", having committed "carnal infidelities" (Montoneros followed the rules dictated for the "New Man" by Che Guevara). Urondo was assigned to Mendoza, where he ended up being identified and killed.

== Exile ==
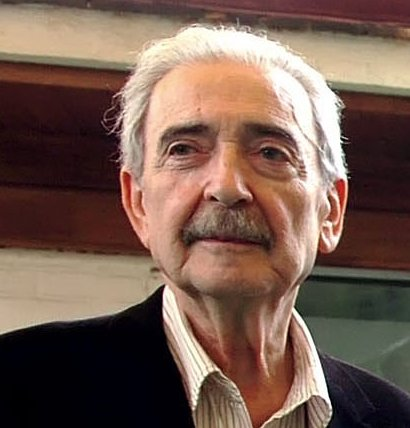
The poet and journalist Juan Gelman (1930–2014)

After the paramilitary organization Triple A appeared in 1975, Massaferro was told by Guillermo Julio Vailati a peronist lawyer and Dean of the Buenos Aires Law University at the time and friend of her second husband Marcelo de Laferrere that she had to leave the country as she was in great danger, she traveled to Rome – now in a partnership with Juan Gelman – and went to work with Argentina's Delia Ana Fanego on a committee to reveal Triple A's actions and the repression in Argentina in the Roman newspapers.

== In the late dictatorship ==
When the National Reorganization Process began on 24 March 1976, Lili Massaferro continued to fight against the bloody dictatorship of Videla from her position as a member of the women's branch of the MPM.

In 1977 she participated in the publication of the book Argentina: Proceso al Genocidio, together with Eduardo Luis Duhalde, Rodolfo Mattarollo, and Gustavo Roca.

She toured Europe from top to bottom several times, visiting Amsterdam, Stockholm, Geneva, London, Madrid, Paris, and Rome. She alerted governments, discussed with diplomats, made and accompanied complaints about thousands of the disappeared, gave shelter, and protected the relatives' organizations (who made their first trips from Argentina). In the late 1980s, to support herself, she sold jewelry on Goya Street in Madrid.

== Return ==
In early 1984 Lili Massaferro again saw her children, who traveled to Spain. She returned to Argentina in 1989. She reconciled with her second husband Marcelo Lafferrere, and bought a farm in Marcos Paz – 50 km from the center of Buenos Aires – where she received her grandchildren and cared for animals and plants.

She was one of those interviewed in David "Coco" Blaustein's documentary Montoneros. Cazadores de utopías.

== Illness and death ==
For many years she suffered from badly healed hepatitis (which developed into cirrhosis), and from persistent thrombophlebitis that left her hospitalized at the end of her life. She was attended by the doctor Juan Pablo Argumedo, son of the Rosario politician Alcira Argumedo.

Lili Massaferro died on 26 April 2001, at age 74, in Buenos Aires.

== Filmography ==
- 1956: Beyond Oblivion, as Herminia the maid
- 1957: The House of the Angel, as Julieta
- 1958: Rosaura at 10 O'Clock, as Elsa
- 1959: News in Hell
- 1968: Ufa con el sexo (not released in Argentina until 2007)
