= Catita =

Stock character played by Niní Marshall

Catita was a stock character played by Niní Marshall in many Argentine comedy films of the 1940s and 1950s from the character's first appearance as a cook in Mujeres que trabajan (1938) up to Catita es una dama (1956) directed by Julio Saraceni. Catita was a stereotypical foul-mouthed (by 1940s standards) and disruptive daughter of Italian immigrants in Argentina.
