= Five Faces of Woman =

1947 film

- Directed by: Gilberto Martínez Solares
- Written by: Carlos A. Olivari; Sixto Pondal Ríos; Yolanda Vargas Dulché
- Produced by: Salvador Elizondo
- Starring: Arturo de Córdova; Pepita Serrador; Ana María Campoy; Miroslava
- Cinematography: Agustín Martínez Solares
- Edited by: Jorge Bustos
- Music by: Eduardo Hernández Moncada
- Production company: Clasa Films Mundiales
- Release date: 26 February 1947
- Running time: 93 minutes
- Country: Mexico
- Language: Spanish

Five Faces of Woman (Spanish: Cinco rostros de mujer) is a 1947 Mexican musical drama film directed by Gilberto Martínez Solares and starring Arturo de Córdova, Pepita Serrador and Ana María Campoy. It was shot at the Clasa Studios in Mexico City. The film's were designed by the art director by Jorge Fernández

== Cast ==
- Arturo de Córdova as Roberto
- Pepita Serrador as Ivonne Parker
- Ana María Campoy as Carmen
- Miroslava as Beatriz
- Rafael Alcayde as Miguel
- Jorge Mondragon as Ugo Brunelli
- Carolina Barret as Rosita
- Manuel Noriega Ruiz as Pedro, mayordomo
- Manuel Arvide as Gustavo Carreño
- Conchita Gentil Arcos as Casera de Roberto
- Clifford Carr as Enrique Parker
- Rita Macedo as Elena
- José Morcillo as Oficial policía portugues
- Juan Orraca as Jugador de cartas
- Tita Merello as Margot
- Daniel Arroyo as Doctor
- Pedro Elviro as Gendarme
- Enrique García Álvarez as Padre de Beatriz
- Ramón Gay as Jugador cartas
- Juan Pulido as Gendarme
- Nicolas Rodriguez as Jugador cartas
- Manuel Sánchez Navarro as Jugador cartas
- Manuel Trejo Morales as Hombre en casino
- María Valdealde as Esposa de Antonio
- Hernán Vera as Antonio, cantinero

== Bibliography ==
- Frank Javier Garcia Berumen. Brown Celluloid: 1894-1959. Vantage Press, 2003.
