= Los Guerrilleros =

Los Guerrilleros may refer to:

- Los Guerrilleros (1963 film), a 1963 Spanish film
- Los guerrilleros (1965 film), a 1965 Argentine film
