= Ana Arneodo =

Argentine actress

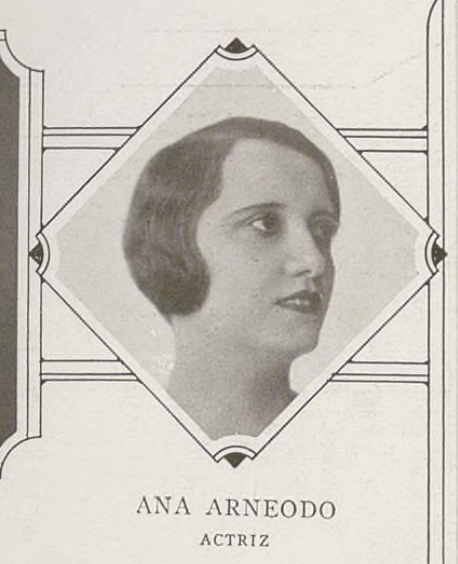
- Born: 1898; Cannes, France
- Died: 1977 (aged 78–79); Buenos Aires, Argentina
- Occupation: Actress

Ana Arneodo (1898 – 1977) was an Argentine actress notable for her work during the Golden Age of Argentine cinema.

Arneodo was a well-known stage actress when she made her first appearance in film in 1939. She made some 24 appearances between then and 1958, appearing in films such as the 1942 film Adolescencia alongside Pola Alonso and Al marido hay que seguirlo (1948). She regularly worked under the films of director Francisco Múgica.

She retired in 1958, and died in 1977, in Buenos Aires.

== Films ==
- 1939 El solterón
- 1940 A Thief Has Arrived
- 1940 Nosotros, los muchachos
- 1940 Un señor mucamo
- 1941 Los martes, orquídeas
- 1941 Una vez en la vida
- 1942 Adolescencia
- 1942 Cada hogar un mundo
- 1942 Su primer baile
- 1942 El viaje
- 1943 Todo un hombre
- 1943 El espejo
- 1943 An Evening of Love
- 1944 Se rematan ilusiones
- 1945 The Abyss Opens
- 1948 Al marido hay que seguirlo
- 1948 La gran tentación
- 1949 La cuna vacía
- 1950 The New Bell
- 1950 Surcos de sangre
- 1953 End of the Month
- 1995 The Lady of the Camellias
- 1954 Barrio Gris
- 1956 Oro bajo
- 1958 Las apariencias engañan
