= You Were Never Lovelier =

1942 musical romantic comedy film by William A. Seiter

- Theatrical release poster
- Directed by: William A. Seiter
- Screenplay by: Michael Fessier; Ernest Pagano; Delmer Daves
- Story by: Carlos Olivari; Sixto Pondal Ríos
- Produced by: Louis F. Edelman
- Starring: Fred Astaire; Rita Hayworth; Adolphe Menjou
- Cinematography: Ted Tetzlaff
- Edited by: William A. Lyon
- Music by: Leigh Harline
- Production company: Columbia Pictures
- Distributed by: Columbia Pictures
- Release date: November 19, 1942
- Running time: 97 minutes
- Country: United States
- Language: English
- Box office: $1.6 million (US rentals)

You Were Never Lovelier is a 1942 American musical romantic comedy film directed by William A. Seiter and starring Fred Astaire and Rita Hayworth. The supporting cast also features Adolphe Menjou, Xavier Cugat and Adele Mara. The music was composed by Jerome Kern and the lyrics by Johnny Mercer. The picture was released by Columbia Pictures and includes the elaborate "Shorty George" and romantic "I'm Old Fashioned" song and dance sequences.

The film, a Hollywood remake of the 1941 Argentine romantic comedy Los martes, orquídeas (On Tuesdays, Orchids), is set in Buenos Aires.

== Plot ==
Robert "Bob" Davis is a well-known American dancer with a weakness for betting on the horses. After he loses his money gambling in Buenos Aires, he goes looking for a job with Eduardo Acuña, the wealthy owner of a nightclub. Acuña, however, does not wish to see him. Bob's friend, bandleader Xavier Cugat, invites him to perform at the wedding of Acuña's eldest daughter, Julia. Acuña insists his daughters must wed in order of age, from oldest to youngest. Maria is next in line to get married but refuses to, much to the disappointment of her two younger sisters, Cecy and Lita, who both have boyfriends and want to marry as soon as possible.

During Julia's wedding reception, Bob is attracted to Maria, but his advances are rebuffed by her, and she refuses to speak to him. While talking with Acuña, Bob remarks that Maria's personality is like "the inside of a refrigerator". Aware of his younger daughters' plight, Acuña works out a plan: he sends orchids and anonymous love notes from a supposed secret admirer to Maria to help get her in the mood. One day, when Bob once again tries to see Acuña at his office, Acuña orders the unseen Bob, mistakenly assuming him to be a bellboy, to deliver the latest note and flower. Maria, who by now is feeling amorous and eagerly awaiting the next love letter from her secret admirer, sees Bob dropping off the note and flower and assumes that he is her admirer. When Maria sees Bob at her father's office, she asks her father to introduce them and invite Bob to dinner. At the dinner, after Mrs. Acuña almost shoots Bob, Maria invites Bob to the garden, where they dance. Finding that Maria has become infatuated with Bob, whom Mr. Acuña despises, the father makes a deal with the dancer: in exchange for a contract to perform at the club at some later date, Bob will court Maria and then repel her with his "obnoxious" personality.

Despite Bob's efforts to disappoint Maria, the two quickly fall in love. With his plan gone completely awry, Acuña orders Bob to leave Buenos Aires. At the Acuñas' 25th anniversary party, Mr. Acuña composes a farewell love note for Bob. Mrs. Acuña overhears him reciting the note in his office and accuses him of cheating on her with another Maria, her dear friend Maria Castro. While Mr. Acuña tries to defend himself, Bob and Maria come into the office. Bob confesses that he did not write the love letters, disillusioning Maria.

Impressed by Bob's behavior, Acuña grants him permission to begin dating Maria. After repeated deliveries of flowers fail to change Maria's attitude to him, Bob remembers Mr. Acuña telling him that when Maria was young, she became infatuated with Lochinvar, a fictional knight in Sir Walter Scott's poem Marmion. That night, Bob arrives at the Acuña home wearing a suit of armor and riding a horse. Maria is amused and decides to reconcile with him.

== Cast ==
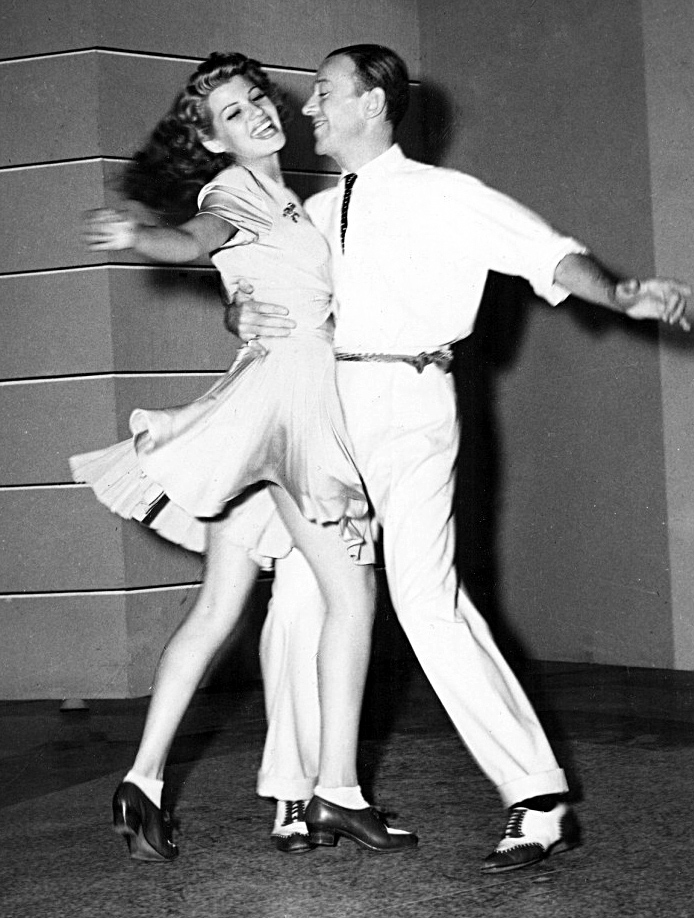
Astaire and Hayworth in a publicity shot for the film

- Fred Astaire as Bob Davis
- Rita Hayworth as Maria Acuña
- Adolphe Menjou as Eduardo Acuña
- Isobel Elsom as Maria Castro
- Leslie Brooks as Cecy Acuña
- Adele Mara as Lita Acuña
- Xavier Cugat as himself
- Gus Schilling as Fernando, Acuña's secretary
- Barbara Brown as Mrs. Delfina Acuña, Eduardo's wife
- Douglas Leavitt as Juan Castro, Maria's husband
- Mary Field as the Acuña Maid

== Production ==
The film was the second of two films starring the duo of Astaire and Hayworth, following the box-office success of the previous year's You'll Never Get Rich. The new film avoided the wartime themes of the previous film, while benefiting from lavish production values – a consequence of the box-office success of the earlier film. Kern created a standard with "I'm Old Fashioned". Initially, Kern was unhappy about the selection of Cugat and his orchestra; however, when production was complete, he was so pleased with the band's performance that he presented Cugat with a silver baton. Although Hayworth had a fine voice, Harry Cohn insisted on her singing being dubbed throughout by Nan Wynn.

The film is a reworking of the 1941 Argentine musical Los martes, orquídeas (On Tuesdays, Orchids) directed by Francisco Múgica. It follows the usual conventions established by Astaire in his earlier musicals, such as an anti-romantic first meeting between the two leads, a virtuoso dance solo for Astaire, a playful dance duet and a romantic dance duet.

== Key songs/dance routines ==
The film's dance director was Val Raset, the only time he collaborated with Astaire, and his choreographic input into the film is unclear. According to Astaire's biography, he worked out all the numbers with Hayworth while rehearsing above a funeral parlour. Although the setting is a Latin one, Kern felt unable to compose in this style, but Astaire was determined to continue his exploration of Latin dance, which he did with the help of special arrangements by Cugat and Murphy, and the inspiration provided by the enthusiastic and talented Hayworth. This became an important counterbalance to Kern's tendency to compose sweet, occasionally saccharine, melodies. Hayworth's performance here establishes her claim as one of Astaire's foremost dance partners.

- "Chiu Chiu": Cugat's band performs this showpiece samba with music and lyrics by Nicanor Molinare sung and danced by Lina Romay, Miguelito Valdés and chorus in front of Astaire.
- "Dearly Beloved": Kern & Mercer's ballad became a major hit for Astaire – who sings it here – and it was nominated for an Academy Award for Best Original Song. Shortly after, Hayworth (singing dubbed by Nan Wynn) reprises the song with a brief romantic dance, alone in her bedroom.
- "Audition Dance": "One of my best solos" was Astaire's verdict on his first solo routine on the theme of Latin dance, celebrated for its comic inventiveness and dexterity. Astaire's number also inspired Jerome Robbins’ solo Latin dance in the latter’s first ballet Fancy Free, created in 1944.
- "I'm Old Fashioned": A Kern melody, with Hayworth lip-synching Mercer’s lyrics, inspires Astaire’s second Latin romantic partnered dance, and one of his best known. This dance was chosen by Jerome Robbins as the centerpiece to his ballet of the same name, created by him for the New York City Ballet in 1983, as a tribute to Astaire.
- "The Shorty George": This number required more rehearsal time than all the other dances together. A synthesis of American Swing or Jive with virtuoso tap dancing is performed by Astaire and Hayworth, both in top form and exuding a sense of fun in an arrangement by Lyle "Spud" Murphy. The title refers to a popular dance step of the time, attributed to George "Shorty" Snowden, a champion African-American dancer at Harlem’s Savoy Ballroom and reputed inventor of the Lindy Hop or Jitterbug dance styles. Here, as in the "Pick Yourself Up" and "Bojangles of Harlem" numbers from Swing Time, Kern belied his claim that he couldn't write in the Swing style.
- "Wedding in the Spring": Deliberatedly old-fashioned number performed tongue-in-cheek by Cugat's band, sung by Romay and chorus and including a light-hearted Astaire/Hayworth ballroom dance.
- "You Were Never Lovelier": A Kern melody with Mercer lyrics, first sung romantically by Astaire to Hayworth. A celebratory dance reprise at end of the film is initiated comically by an armour-suited Astaire falling off a horse before shedding the armour to reveal white tie and tails. According to Astaire, the original dance number that followed the initial song was cut from the film after the preview as the studio felt it "held up the story".
- "These Orchids": The Kern melody is performed first by a chorus of florist's delivery boys and then by Cugat's band in rumba style as an orchestral serenade to Hayworth outside her bedroom window.

== Award nominations ==
The following received Academy Award nominations:

- Leigh Harline: Music (Scoring of a Musical Picture)
- Jerome Kern (music) and Johnny Mercer (lyrics) for Music (Song), for "Dearly Beloved"
- John P. Livadary: Sound Recording

== Bibliography ==
- Fred Astaire: Steps in Time, 1959, multiple reprints. (British edition (registration required).)
- John Mueller: Astaire Dancing: The Musical Films of Fred Astaire (registration required), Knopf, 1985, ISBN 0-394-51654-0
