= Shoot Twice =

1969 film

- Film poster
- Directed by: Nando Cicero
- Written by: Jaime Jesús Balcázar
- Starring: Klaus Kinski
- Cinematography: Francisco Marín
- Edited by: Renato Cinquini
- Release date: 14 April 1969
- Running time: 92 minutes
- Countries: Italy; Spain
- Language: Italian

Shoot Twice (Italian: Due volte Giuda, Spanish: Dos veces Judas) is a 1969 Italian Western film directed by Nando Cicero and starring Klaus Kinski and Antonio Sabàto.

== Cast ==
- Klaus Kinski - Dingus / aka Victor Barrett
- Antonio Sabàto - Luke Barrett
- Cristina Galbó - Luke's wife
- José Calvo - Russel (as Pepe Calvo)
- Emma Baron - Luke's Mother
- Milo Quesada
- Franco Leo
- Linda Sini
- Narciso Ibáñez Menta
- Franco Beltramme
- Damián Rabal
- Maite Matalonga
- Claudia Rivelli
- Carlos Ronda
- Gastone Pescucci
- Gianni Pulone (as Giancarlo Pulone)
- Gaetano Scala
- José Palomo
- Ettore Bruson
- Nino Nini
- Antonietta Fiorito
- Pino Sciacqua (as Giuseppe Sciacqua)
- Sergio De Vecchi
- Ettore Broschi

== Releases ==
Wild East released this alongside And God Said to Cain in a limited edition R0 NTSC DVD in 2013.
