= Nélida Bilbao =

Argentine film actress

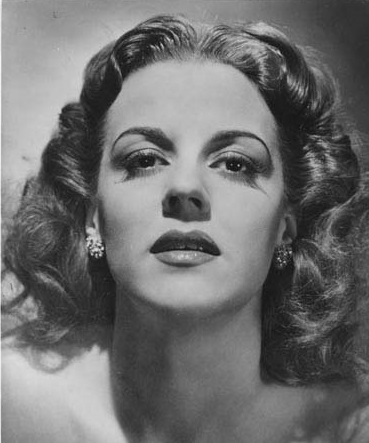
- Nélida Bilbao in 1960
- Born: 1918; Buenos Aires, Argentina
- Died: August 1990 (aged 71–72); Buenos Aires, Argentina
- Occupation: Actress
- Years active: 1938-1963 (film)

Nélida Bilbao (1918 – August 1990) was an Argentine film actress. She appeared in twenty-six films between 1938 and 1963.

== Filmography ==
- Women Who Work (1938)
- Jettatore (1938)
- Mi suegra es una fiera (1939)
- Divorce in Montevideo (1939)
- A Thief Has Arrived (1940)
- The Tango Star (1940)
- Mi fortuna por un nieto (1940)
- Sweethearts for the Girls (1941)
- The Unhappiest Man in Town (1941)
- Pueblo chico, infierno grande (1941)
- Story of a Poor Young Man (1942)
- I Knew That Woman(1942)
- Little Teacher of Workmen (1942)
- Incertidumbre (1942)
- La juventud manda (1943)
- Dark Valley (1943)
- An Evening of Love (1943)
- The Corpse Breaks a Date (1944)
- La verdadera victoria (1945)
- The Cat (1947)
- ¿Vendrás a media noche? (1950)
- Derecho viejo (1951)
- Un guapo del 900 (1952)
- News in Hell (1959)
- Las modelos (1963)
- Aquellos que fueron (TV Mini Series, 3 episodes, 1973)

== Bibliography ==
- Richard, Alfred . Censorship and Hollywood's Hispanic image: an interpretive filmography, 1936-1955. Greenwood Press, 1993.
