= Bárbara Mujica =

Argentine actress

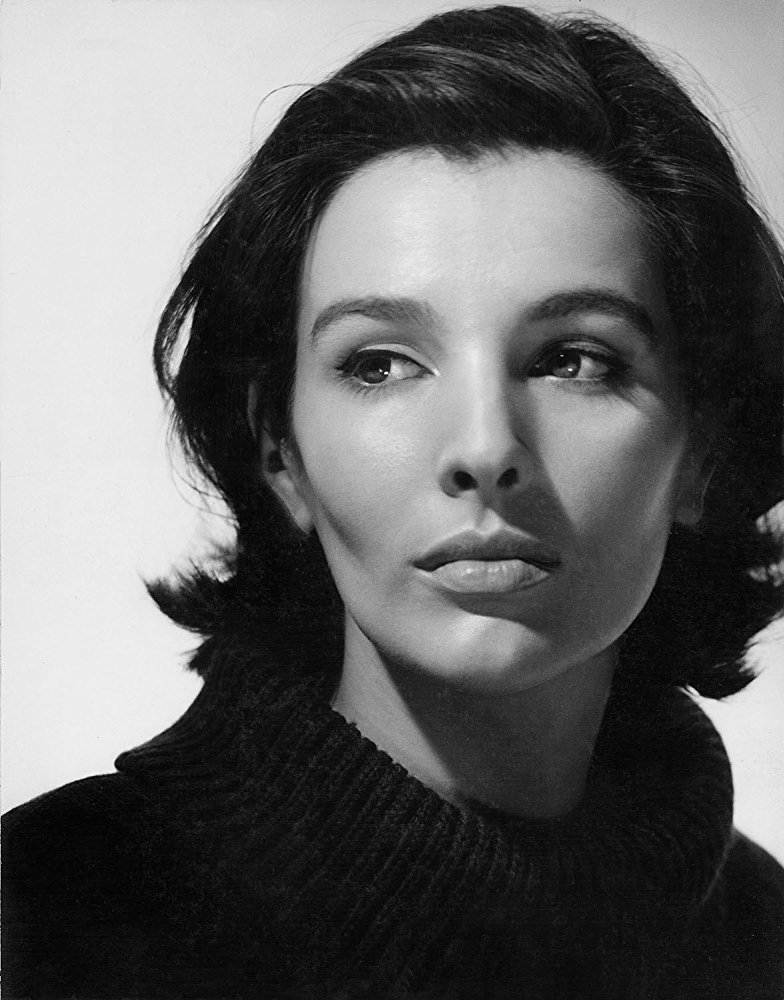
Bárbara Mujica by Annemarie Heinrich, 1965

Bárbara Mujica (née Bárbara Moinelo Múgica; stage name Barbara Moinelo; March 13, 1944, in Buenos Aires – August 1, 1990, in Buenos Aires) was an Argentine film, stage, and television actress of the 1960s and 1970s. Her mother was the actress Alba Mujica; she was the niece of the director, René Mugica. She died in 1990 of a myocardial infarction.

== Filmography ==
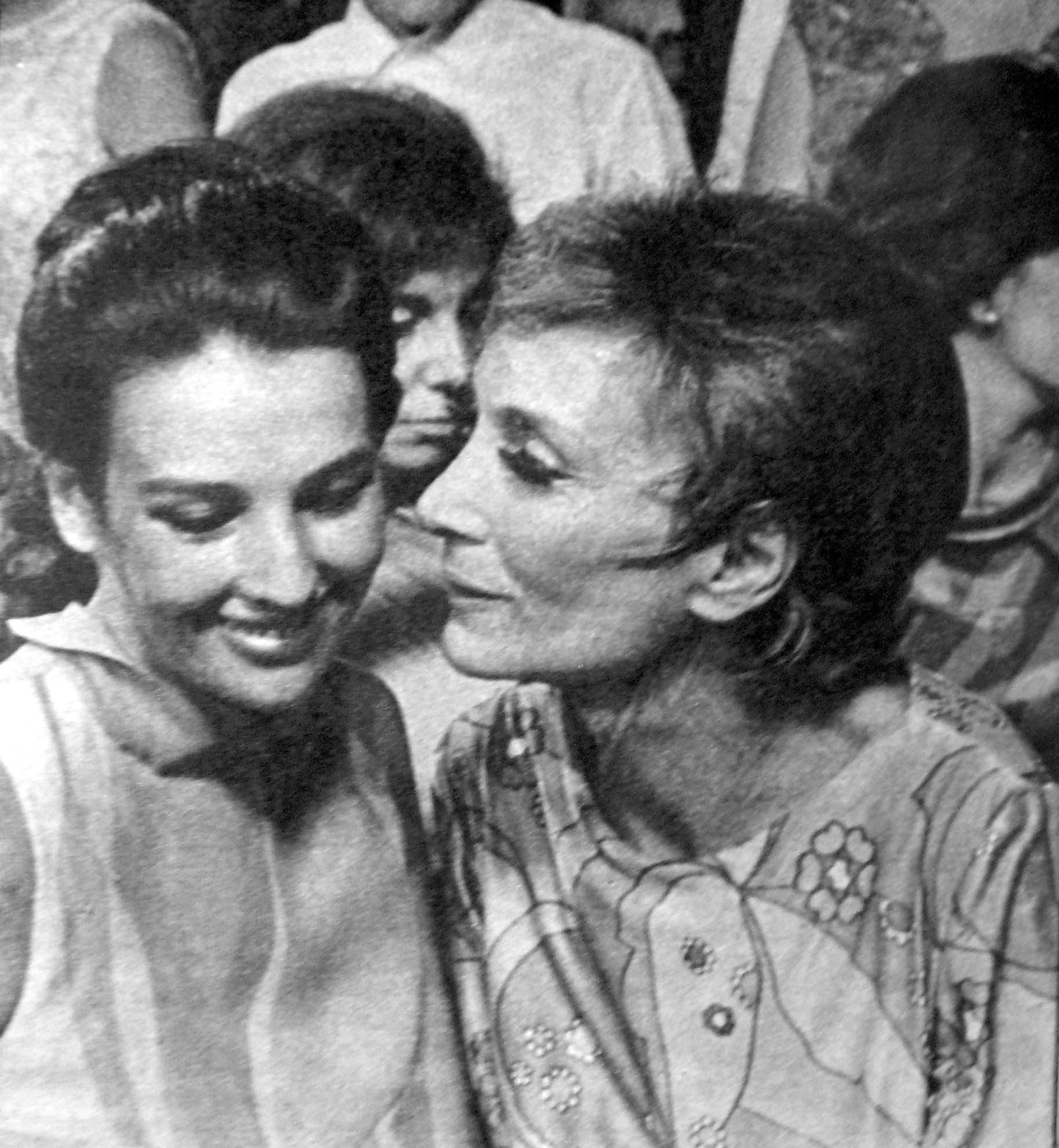
Bárbara Mujica with her mother, the actress Alba Mujica

1. Loraldia (El tiempo de las flores) (1991)
2. The Girlfriend (1989)
3. The Two Waters (1988)
4. Debajo del mundo (1987)
5. Bad Company (1986)
6. Malayunta (1986)
7. Gracias por el fuego (1983)
8. Yesterday's Guys Used No Arsenic (1976), Laura Otamendi
9. The Inheritors (1970)
10. The ABC of Love (1967)
11. Los guerrilleros (1965), Patricia
12. El octavo infierno, cárcel de mujeres (1964), Zulema Puentes
13. Las ratas (1962)
14. Los que verán a Dios (1961)
15. Quinto año nacional (1961)
16. Demasiado jóvenes (1958)
17. The House of the Angel (1957), Vicenta
18. Edad difícil (1956), Alicia Núñez
19. El muro (1947)
