= The House of the Angel =

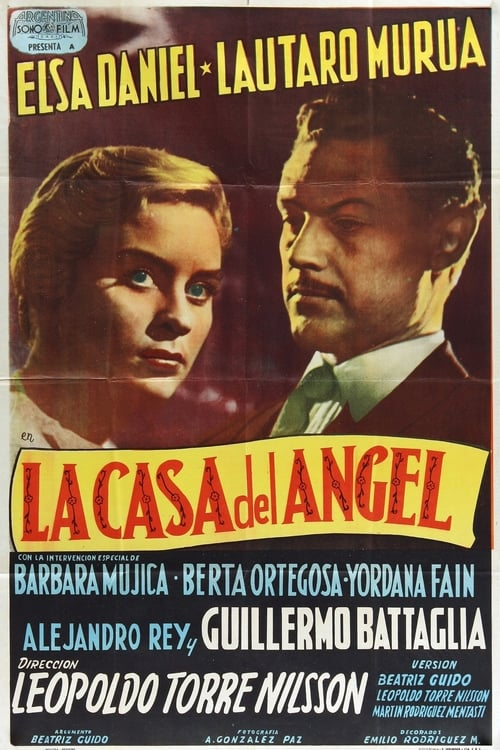
- Theatrical release poster
- Spanish: La casa del ángel
- Directed by: Leopoldo Torre Nilsson
- Written by: Beatriz Guido; Leopoldo Torre Nilsson; Martín Rodríguez M.
- Based on: La casa del ángel by Beatriz Guido
- Starring: Elsa Daniel; Lautaro Murúa
- Cinematography: Aníbal González Paz
- Edited by: Jorge Gárate
- Production company: Argentina Sono Film
- Release date: July 11, 1957
- Running time: 76 minutes
- Country: Argentina
- Language: Spanish

The House of the Angel (Spanish: La casa del ángel) is a 1957 Argentine drama film directed by Leopoldo Torre Nilsson based the novel of the same name by his wife Beatriz Guido, who also co-wrote the screenplay.

The film was entered into the 10th Cannes Film Festival, where it competed for the Palme d'Or prize.

The film is considered a turning point in the history of Argentine cinema, as its international success contributed to the development of more national productions.

It was selected as the second greatest Argentine film of all time in a poll conducted by the Museo del Cine Pablo Ducrós Hicken in 1977, while it ranked 6th in the 1984 edition and 10th in the 2000 edition. In a new version of the survey organized in 2022 by the specialized magazines La vida util, Taipei and La tierra quema, presented at the Mar del Plata International Film Festival, the film reached the 22 position.

== Cast ==
- Elsa Daniel - Ana
- Lautaro Murúa - Pablo Aguirre
- Guillermo Battaglia - Dr. Castro, Father of Ana
- Berta Ortegosa - Señora de Castro, Mather of Ana
- Yordana Fain - Naná
- Bárbara Mujica - Vicenta
- Alejandro Rey - Julian
- Lili Gacel - Julieta
- Alicia Bellán
