= Musical Romance (1947 film) =

- Directed by: Ernesto Arancibia
- Written by: Carlos A. Olivari; Sixto Pondal Ríos
- Starring: Libertad Lamarque
- Cinematography: Francis Boeniger
- Edited by: José Gallego
- Music by: Alejandro Gutiérrez del Barrio
- Production company: Estudios San Miguel
- Release date: 22 January 1947
- Running time: 92 minutes
- Country: Argentina
- Language: Spanish

Musical Romance (Spanish: Romance musical) is a 1947 Argentine musical comedy film of the classical era of Argentine cinema, directed by Ernesto Arancibia and starring Libertad Lamarque.

The film's sets were designed by the art director Ralph Pappier.

== Cast ==
- Libertad Lamarque
- Juan José Miguez
- Carlos Castro
- Bertha Moss
- Ernesto Raquén
- Julio Renato
- Enrique de Rosas
- Amelia Senisterra
- Miriam Sucre
- Elena Zucotti
