= Adiós muchachos (film) =

- Directed by: Armando Bo
- Written by: Rafael García Ibáñez
- Starring: Pola Alonso; Arturo Arcari; Héctor Armendáriz; Lina Bardo; Alfredo Dalton; Juancito Díaz
- Edited by: Rosalino Caterbetti
- Release date: 25 November 1955
- Running time: 85 minutes
- Countries: Argentina; Spain
- Language: Spanish

Adiós, muchachos (English language: Goodbye, boys) is a 1955 Argentine film directed by Armando Bo and written by Rafael García Ibáñez. The film starred Pola Alonso and Arturo Arcari.

== Cast ==
- Pola Alonso
- Arturo Arcari
- Héctor Armendáriz
- Lina Bardo
- Alfredo Dalton
- Juancito Díaz
- Francisco Pablo Donadio
- Rolando Dumas
- Carlos A. Dusso
- José María Fra
- Arturo Huber
- Jorge Leval
- Eugenio Novile
- Juan Carlos Prevende
- Virginia Romay
- Marcelo Ruggero
- Héctor Silva
- Silvia Sisley
- José Soriano
- Osvaldo Tempore
- Mateo Velich
