= Divorce in Montevideo =

Divorcio en Montevideo
- Directed by: Manuel Romero
- Written by: Manuel Romero
- Produced by: Manuel Romero
- Starring: Enrique Serrano
- Release date: 1939
- Running time: 83 minute
- Country: Argentina
- Language: Spanish

Divorce in Montevideo (Spanish: Divorcio en Montevideo) is a 1939 Argentine comedy film directed by Manuel Romero during the Golden Age of Argentine cinema. The tango film premiered in Buenos Aires and starred Enrique Serrano.

== Cast ==
- Niní Marshall
- Enrique Serrano
- Sabina Olmos
- Marcelo Ruggero
- Roberto García Ramos
- Mary Dormal
- Nélida Bilbao
- Fernando Campos
- Pedro Laxalt
- Hilda Sour
- Nathán Pinzón

== See also ==
- List of works by Manuel Romero
