= News in Hell =

- Directed by: Román Viñoly Barreto
- Music by: George Andreani
- Production company: Lumiton
- Release date: 1959
- Running time: 72 minute
- Country: Argentina
- Language: Spanish

News in Hell (Spanish: Reportaje en el infierno) is a 1959 Argentine film directed by Román Viñoly Barreto.

== Cast ==
- Osvaldo Miranda
- Nélida Bilbao
- Nathán Pinzón
- Argentinita Vélez
- José Cibrián
- Néstor Deval
- María Esther Buschiazzo
- Rafael Frontaura
- Alba Mujica
- Alejandro Maximino
- Carlos Rossi
- Lili Gacel
- Ariel Absalón
