= The Cat (1947 film) =

1947 film

- Directed by: Mario Soffici
- Written by: Rino Alessi; Tulio Demicheli; Roberto Talice
- Starring: Zully Moreno
- Cinematography: Antonio Merayo
- Edited by: Jorge Gárate
- Release date: 1947
- Country: Argentina
- Language: Spanish

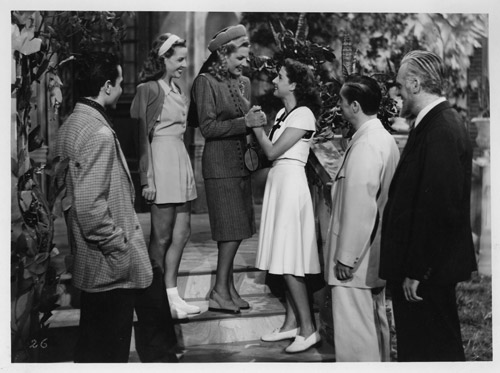
Scene from the film 'La Gata' / the cat (1947). From left to right: Horacio Priani, Nélida Bilbao, Zully Moreno, Sabina Olmos, Enrique Álvarez Diosdado, and Adolfo Linvel.

The Cat (Spanish: La gata) is a 1947 Argentine drama film of the classical era of Argentine cinema, directed by Mario Soffici and based on a play by Rino Alessi. It was entered into the 1947 Cannes Film Festival.

== Plot ==
Two upper-class women and a young man became trapped in a love triangle which eventually evolved into a tragedy.

== Cast ==
- Zully Moreno
- Sabina Olmos
- Nélida Bilbao
- Enrique Diosdado (as Enrique Álvarez Diosdado)
- Alberto Closas
- Horacio Priani
- Carlos Alajarín
- Tito Grassi
- Violeta Martino
- Adolfo Linvel
