= Ángel Magaña =

Argentine actor

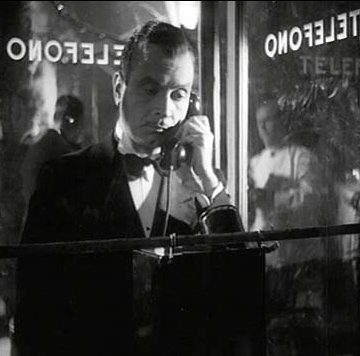
- Angel Magaña in No abras esa puerta (1952)
- Born: August 24, 1915; Buenos Aires, Argentina
- Died: November 13, 1982 (aged 67); Buenos Aires
- Spouse: Nuri Montsé

Ángel Magaña (August 24, 1915 – November 13, 1982) was an Argentine film actor of the Golden Age of Argentine cinema during the 1930s, 1940s and 1950s.

He was married to the Spanish-Argentine film actress Nuri Montsé.

== Filmography ==
1. Hotel de señoritas (1979)
2. El juicio de Dios (inconclusa - 1979)
3. Así es la vida, Alberto Castañares
4. Dos locos en el aire (1976)
5. Los chantas (1975), Aurelio
6. Andrea (1973)
7. Adiós Alejandra (1973)
8. Mi amigo Luis (1972)
9. La sonrisa de mamá (1972), Damián
10. La familia hippie (1971)
11. ¡Viva la vida! (1969)
12. Flor de piolas (1967)
13. La Cigarra está que arde (1967)
14. Viaje de una noche de verano (1965)
15. La industria del matrimonio (1964), (episodio "Correo sentimental")
16. Ritmo nuevo, vieja ola (1964), Dr. Marcelo Maines
17. La Cigarra no es un bicho (1963)
18. Historia de una carta (1957)
19. Requiebro (1955)
20. El cura Lorenzo (1954)
21. Los ojos llenos de amor (1954)
22. Un ángel sin pudor (1953)
23. Don't Ever Open That Door (1952), Raúl Valdez (episodio "Alguien al teléfono")
24. Vuelva el primero! (1952)
25. Cosas de mujer (1951)
26. Arroz con leche (1950)
27. Esposa último modelo (1950), Alfredo Villegas
28. Cuando besa mi marido (1950)
29. Piantadino (1950)
30. La cuna vacía (1949)
31. La calle grita (1948)
32. Nunca te diré adiós (1947)
33. The Corpse Breaks a Date (1944), Daniel Rivero
34. His Best Student (1944)
35. Cuando florezca el naranjo (1943)
36. La Guerra Gaucha (1942)
37. Adolescencia (1942)
38. Yo quiero morir contigo (1941), Mauricio Berardi
39. El mejor papá del mundo (1941)
40. Fragata Sarmiento (1940)
41. Héroes sin fama (1940)
42. Prisioneros de la tierra (1939)
43. El viejo doctor (1939)
44. Puerta cerrada (1938), Daniel
45. Kilómetro 111 (1938)
46. Con las alas rotas (1938)
47. Viento Norte (1937)
48. Cadetes de San Martín (1937)
49. El caballo del pueblo (1935), Extra
