= Berta Ortegosa =

Argentine actress (1920–2010)

- Born: 1920
- Died: 2010 (aged 89–90)
- Occupation: Actress

Berta Ortegosa (1920–2010) was an Argentine actress. She starred in films such as Historia de una mala mujer (1947), Albéniz (1947), Don Juan Tenorio (1949), Hombres a precio (1949), Catita es una dama (1956), La casa del ángel (1957) (in which she played a mother "obsessed with her daughters' virginity"), Setenta veces siete (1962), Mujeres perdidas (1964) and Boquitas pintadas (1974). Ortegosa was known for her dramatic roles, and was a frequent collaborator with director Leopoldo Torre Nilsson. She was married to the actor Luis Corradi.

== Filmography ==
Year	Title	Role	Notes
1947	Albéniz		
1948	Historia de una mala mujer		
1949	Un tropezón cualquiera da en la vida	Emilia	
1949	Don Juan Tenorio	Doña Ana de Pantoja	
1949	Juan Globo	Lucy	
1950	Hombres a precio		
1954	Su seguro servidor		
1956	Los maridos de mamá		
1956	Catita es una dama	Doña Amalia	
1957	La casa del ángel	Sra. de Castro, Mother of Ana	
1961	La mano en la trampa	Laura's Mother	
1962	Setenta veces siete		Uncredited
1962	Hombre de la esquina rosada		
1964	Mujeres perdidas		
1974	Boquitas pintadas		(final film role)
