= Sixto Pondal Ríos =

Argentine screenwriter, poet and dramatist

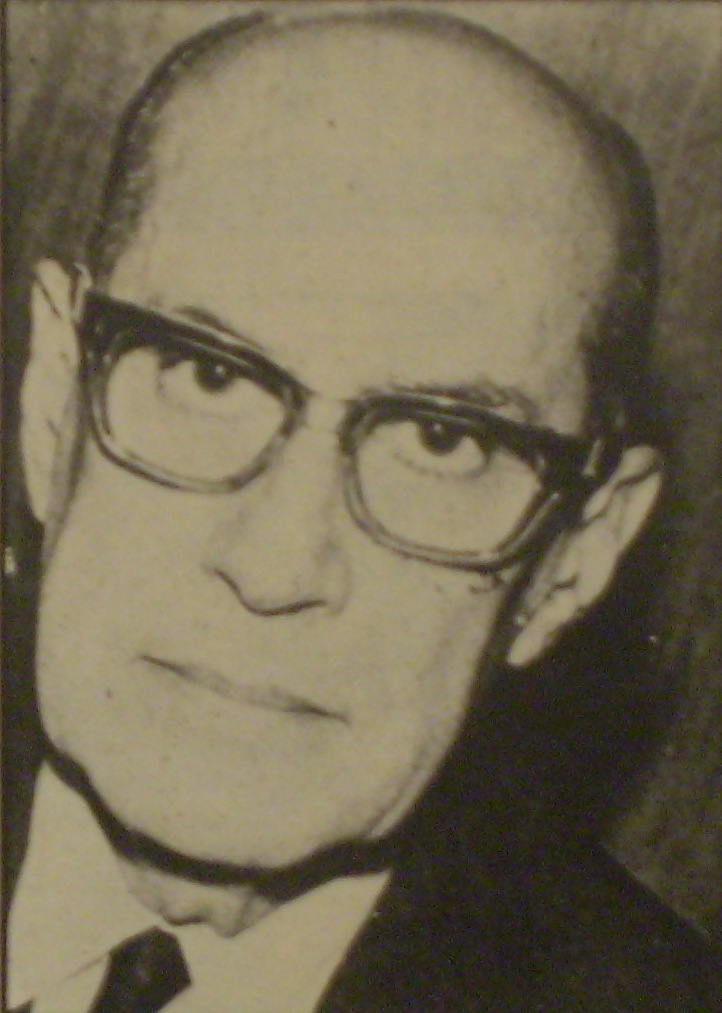
Sixto Pondal Ríos

Sixto Pondal Ríos (April 8, 1907 - September 29, 1968) was an Argentine screenwriter, poet and dramatist.

== Biography ==
Rios was born in San Miguel de Tucumán, Argentina. Although most of his film work took place in Argentina, the 1948 film Romance on the High Seas was based on his story (with Carlos Olivari) and is notable as Doris Day's first film role. He died in Buenos Aires, aged 61.

== Selected filmography ==
- El mejor papá del mundo (1941)
- Los martes, orquídeas (1941)
- Persona honrada se necesita (1941)
- You Were Never Lovelier (1942)
- The Journey (1942)
- The Minister's Daughter (1943)
- The Corpse Breaks a Date (1944)
- Two Angels and a Sinner (1945)
- The Maharaja's Diamond (1946)
- Cristina (1946)
- The Private Life of Mark Antony and Cleopatra (1947)
- Five Faces of Woman (1947)
- Musical Romance (1947)
- Romance on the High Seas (1948)
- Pasó en mi barrio (1951)
- The Seducer of Granada (1953)
- Sugar Harvest (1958) (producer)
- Behind a Long Wall (1958)

== See also ==
- Lists of Argentine films
