= Froilán Varela =

Uruguayan actor

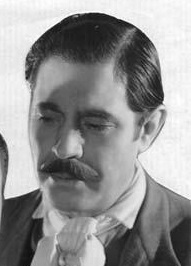
- Varela in 1938
- Born: 1891; Montevideo, Uruguay
- Died: 11 August 1948 (aged 56–57); Córdoba, Argentina
- Occupation: Actor
- Years active: 1934–1947 (film)

Froilán Varela (1891–1948) was a Uruguayan stage and film actor. He spent most of his life in Argentina, where he appeared in twenty two films including the historical Savage Pampas (1945) for which he won the Silver Condor Award for Best Supporting Actor.

== Selected filmography ==
- The Caranchos of Florida (1938)
- The Road of the Llamas (1942)
- Savage Pampas (1945)

== Bibliography ==
- Finkielman, Jorge. The Film Industry in Argentina: An Illustrated Cultural History. McFarland, 24 Dec 2003.
