= Alba Mujica =

Argentine film and stage actress

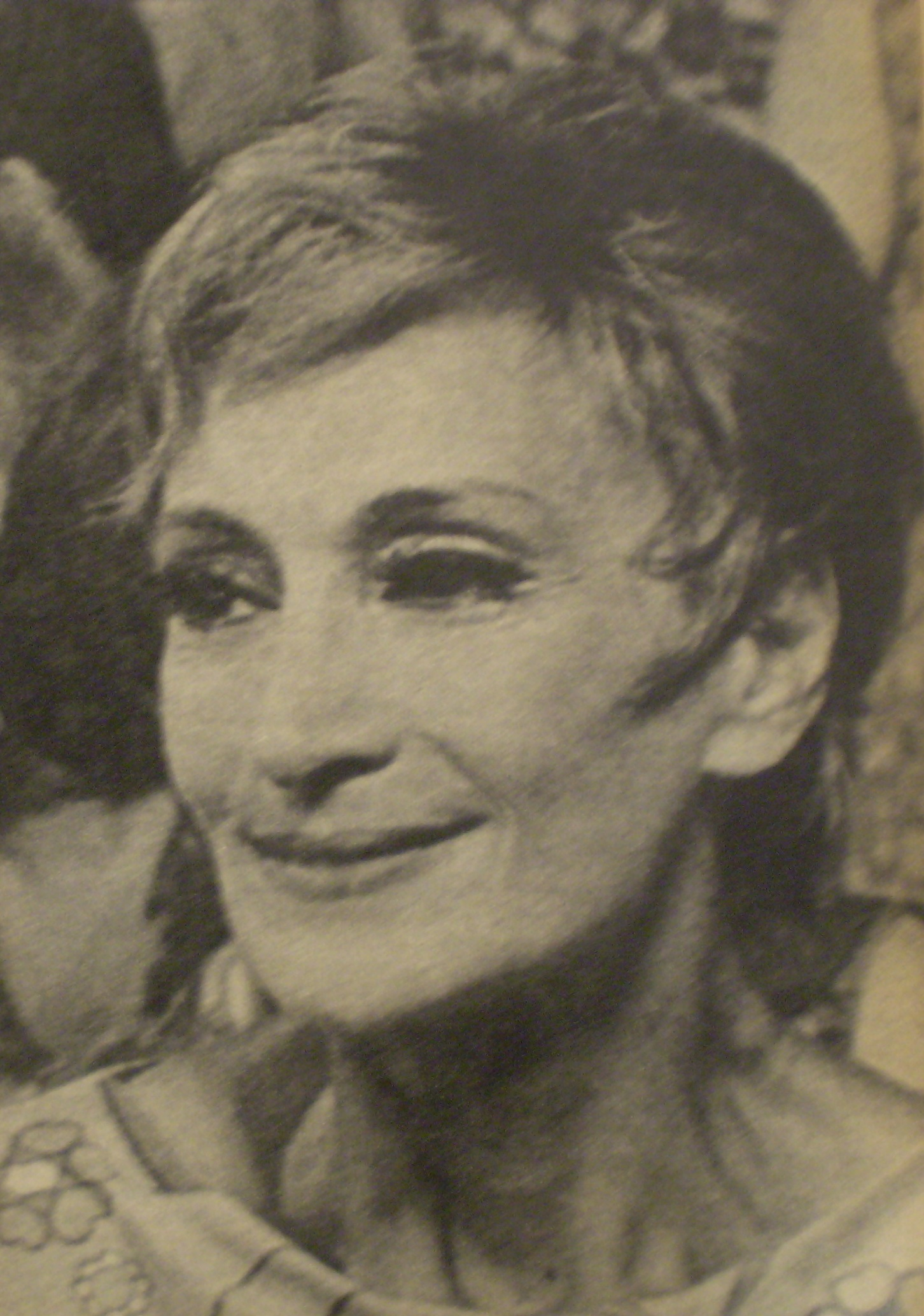
Alba Mujica

Alba Mujica (née Alba Mugica; 1916 in Carhué – 1983 in Buenos Aires) was an Argentine film and stage actress. She was the sister of actor and film director René Mugica. Her mother was the actress Emilia Rosales (Emilia Mugica). She was the mother of the actress Bárbara Mujica. Mujica attended school in La Plata. She was an actress in Argentine theater and cinema during the 1950s and 1960s. Her memoir El tiempo entre los dientes was published in 1967. Carhué's Italian Mutual Society Entertainment Hall is named "René Mugica and Mugica Alba" in recognition of the siblings.

In 1970, she participated in the Odol Pregunta program, answering questions about the life and work of Sarah Bernhardt, reaching the final and withdrawing without risking the maximum prize of one million pesos, in order to keep half of it and pay debts incurred.

== Filmography ==
- El juicio de Dios (1979)
- Tiempos duros para Drácula (1975)
- El grito de Celina (1975) Rosalía
- Juan Moreira (1973) La Muerte
- Fuego (1969) Andrea
- La muchacha del cuerpo de oro (1967) Madre de Noemí
- Cómo seducir a una mujer (1967)
- La herencia (1964) Carlota
- El octavo infierno, cárcel de mujeres (1964) La jefa
- Las Furias (1960)
- Sabaleros (1959)
- El cerco (1959)
- Demasiado jóvenes (1958) Señora
- Graciela (1956)
- Para vestir santos (1955)
- Con el más puro amor (1955)
- Deshonra (1952) Celadora
- Reportaje en el infierno (1951)
- Con el sudor de tu frente (1950)
- Cita en las estrellas (1949)
- Nunca te diré adiós (1947)
- Puertos de ensueño (1942)
