= The Road of the Llamas =

El Camino de las llamas

- Directed by: Mario Soffici
- Written by: Homero Manzi, Gustavo Martínez Zuviria
- Release date: 1942
- Country: Argentina
- Language: Spanish

The Road of the Llamas or El Camino de las llamas is a 1942 Argentine film directed by Mario Soffici during the Golden Age of Argentine cinema.

== Cast ==
- Pepita Serrador
- Elisa Galvé
- Roberto Airaldi
- José Olarra
- César Blasco
- Rafael Falcón
- María Herrero
- Vicente Padula
- Pepito Petray
- Froilán Varela
- Jorge Villoldo
