= Corazón (film) =

1947 film

- Directed by: Carlos F. Borcosque
- Written by: Carlos F. Borcosque, Edmondo De Amicis (novel)
- Produced by: Román Viñoly Barreto (supervising producer)
- Starring: Narciso Ibáñez Menta; Juan Carlos Barbieri; Salvador Lotito
- Cinematography: José María Beltrán
- Edited by: Oscar Carchano
- Music by: Isidro B. Maiztegui
- Production company: Film Andes
- Release date: 30 January 1947
- Running time: 90 minutes
- Country: Argentina
- Language: Spanish

Corazón is a 1947 Argentine film of the classical era of Argentine cinema, directed by Carlos F. Borcosque and starring Narciso Ibáñez Menta.

== Cast ==
- Narciso Ibáñez Menta
- Juan Carlos Barbieri
- Salvador Lotito
- Marcos Zucker
- Luis Zaballa
- Diana Ingro
- Carmen Llambí
- Félix Gil
- Juan Fontanals
- Enrique Lerós
- Juan Carlos Altavista
- Alberto Berco ... Extra
- Diego Marcote
- Agustín Orrequia
