= Nuri Montsé =

Spanish-Argentine film actress

Nury Montsé
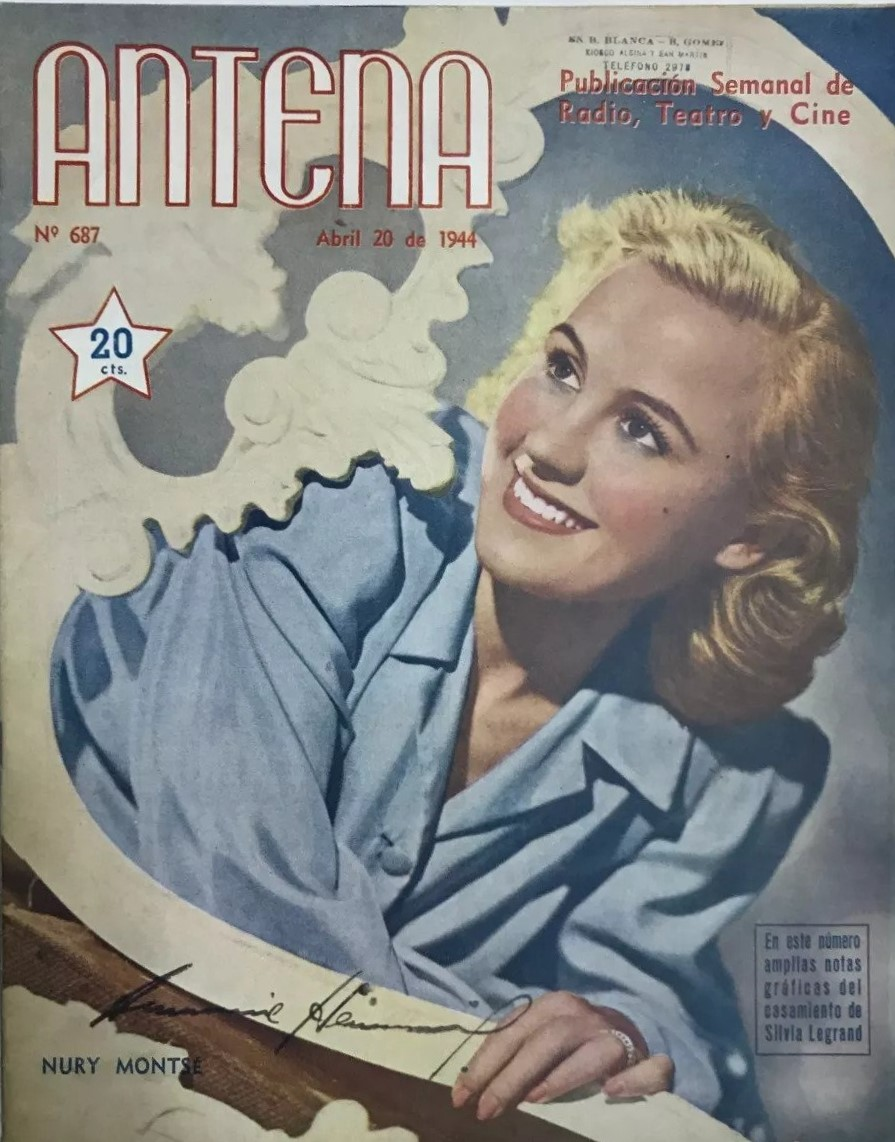
- Born: December 25, 1917; Catalonia, Spain
- Died: December 26, 1971 (aged 54); Buenos Aires, Argentina
- Years active: 1936–1946

Nury Montsé (December 25, 1917 – December 26, 1971) was a Spanish-Argentine film actress of the Golden Age of Argentine cinema.

She made over 20 appearances in Argentine cinema from 1936 to 1946.

She was married to the Argentine film actor Ángel Magaña.

== Filmography ==
- Compañeros (1936)
- Don Quijote del altillo (as Urbana) (1936)
- Papá Chirola (1937)
- Campeón por una mujer (1939)
- Chimbela (1939)
- Palabra de honor (1939)
- Twelve Women (1939)
- Chingolo (1940)
- Con el dedo en el gatillo (1940)
- Dama de compañía (1940)
- Educating Niní (1940)
- La casa del recuerdo (1940)
- Canción de cuna (Cradle Song) (1941)
- El mejor papá del mundo (The Best Father in the World) (1941)
- Los martes, orquídeas (On Tuesdays, Orchids) (1941)
- El gran secreto (1942)
- Historia de crímenes (Tale of Crimes, as Esther) (1942)
- El viejo Hucha (The Old Skinflint) (1942)
- Mi novia es un fantasma (1944)
- Seven Women (1944)
- Su esposa diurna (1944)
- El hombre que se llevaron (as Nury Montsé) (1946)
