= Love, Latest Model =

- Screenshot
- Directed by: Roberto Ratti
- Written by: Ariel Cortazzo; Conrado de Koller
- Starring: Hugo del Carril
- Release date: 1942
- Country: Argentina
- Language: Spanish

Love, Latest Model (Spanish language: Amor último modelo) is a 1942 Argentine comedy film directed by Roberto Ratti and written by Ariel Cortazzo and Conrado de Koller during the Golden Age of Argentine cinema. The film starred Hugo del Carril.

== Cast ==
- Rufino Córdoba
- Adrián Cuneo
- Hugo del Carril
- Susy del Carril
- Mercedes Díaz
- Amanda Ledesma
- Ana María Lynch
- Emma Martínez
- Bertha Moss
- César Ratti
- Luis Sandrini
- Hilda Sour
- Alberto Vila

== Release ==
The film premiered in Argentina on 4 October 1942.
