= Albéniz (film) =

- Theatrical poster
- Directed by: Luis César Amadori
- Written by: Pedro Miguel Obligado
- Produced by: Luis César Amadori
- Starring: Pedro López Lagar; Sabina Olmos
- Cinematography: Antonio Merayo
- Edited by: Jorge Gárate
- Music by: Isaac Albéniz
- Distributed by: Argentina Sono Film
- Release date: 4 February 1947
- Running time: 125 minutes
- Country: Argentina
- Language: Spanish

Albéniz is a 1947 black-and-white Argentine biographical drama film of the classical era of Argentine cinema, directed by Luis César Amadori and written by Pedro Miguel Obligado. The film is based on the life of Spanish composer and pianist, Isaac Albéniz, one of the foremost composers of the Post-romantic era.

The film stars Pedro López Lagar and Sabina Olmos. It won the Silver Condor Award for Best Film and numerous other awards, given by the Argentine Film Critics Association in 1948 for the best picture of the previous year.

== Cast ==
- Pedro López Lagar as Isaac Albéniz
- Sabina Olmos
- Marisa Regules
- Pedro Aleandro
- Amadeo Novoa
- Andrés Mejuto
- Mercedes Díaz
- Susana Canales
- Federico Mansilla
- Eduardo Otero
- María Esther Podestá
- Lilian Valmar
- Berta Ortegosa
- Adolfo Linvel
- Miriam Sucre
- Pastora Soler
- César Fiaschi
- Eugenio Nigro
- Vicente Climent
- José María Gutiérrez

== Release and acclaim ==
The film won the Argentine Film Critics Association Award, the Silver Condor, for best film in 1948. It was also one of the main entries at the 2nd Locarno Film Festival in Switzerland.

The Argentine Academy of Cinematography Arts and Sciences gave several awards for this film:

- Best Picture: Argentina Sono Film
- Best Director: Luis César Amadori
- Best Actor: Pedro López Lagar
- Special mentions: Pedro Miguel Obligado (guionista), Sabina Olmos (actriz), Raúl Soldi (escenógrafo), Guillermo Cases (director musical), Antonio Merayo (director de fotografía), Mario Fezia (operador de cámara), José María Paleo (sonidista), Jorge Garate (montajista) and Roque Giacovino (director de fotografía)
