= The Maharaja's Diamond =

- Directed by: Roberto de Ribón
- Written by: Carlos A. Olivari; Sixto Pondal Ríos
- Starring: Luis Sandrini
- Release date: 17 September 1946
- Running time: 80 minutes
- Country: Chile
- Language: Spanish

The Maharaja's Diamond (Spanish:El diamante del Maharajá) is a 1946 Chilean film directed by Roberto de Ribón and starring Luis Sandrini.

== Cast ==
- Guillermo Battaglia
- Chela Bon
- Juan Corona
- Luis Sandrini
- Maria Teresa Squella

== Bibliography ==
- Plazaola, Luis Trelles. South American Cinema: Dictionary of Film Makers. La Editorial, UPR, 1989.
