= El mejor papá del mundo =

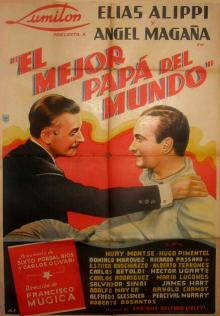
- Directed by: Francisco Múgica
- Written by: Sixto Pondal Ríos
- Starring: Elías Isaac Alippi; Ángel Magaña; Nuri Montsé
- Edited by: Juan Soffici
- Music by: Enrique Delfino
- Production company: Lumiton
- Release date: 14 March 1941 (Argentina)
- Running time: 77 minutes
- Language: Spanish

El mejor papá del mundo (The Best Dad in the World) is a 1941 black and white Argentine drama of the Golden Age of Argentine cinema. It explores a son's gradual realization that his father is far from perfect, and also conveys a message hostile to global capitalism.

== Production ==
El mejor papá del mundo was a black and white Lumiton film directed by Francisco Múgica and written by Sixto Pondal Ríos. It starred Elías Isaac Alippi, Ángel Magaña and Nuri Montsé. The film was released on 14 March 1941.

== Synopsis ==
The film depicts the changing relationship between a prestigious lawyer (Elías Isaac Alippi) and his young son (Ángel Magaña). The son, recently graduated from college and planning to follow in his father's footsteps, gradually discovers the large gap between his idealized image of his father and the reality. The father, who represents an international firm, is involved in a complex web of interests that places his professional ethics in doubt. The film conveys the view that the interests of international monopolies and the Argentine oligarchy are counter to the national interest. The film is interesting in giving a view of life in high society in Argentina of that time.

== Reception ==
Manrupe and Portela described the film as simple and sobering, with an early anti-imperialist message, and noted that it drew on Mario Soffici's earlier film Kilómetro 111 for a boardroom scene. La Mañana de Montevideo described it as fast-paced and interesting, always nuanced, with fine comic and emotional notes.

== Complete cast ==
The complete cast was:

- Elías Isaac Alippi
- Ángel Magaña
- Nuri Montsé
- Hugo Pimentel
- Domingo Márquez
- Carlos Bertoldi
- Ricardo Passano
- María Esther Buschiazzo
- Salvador Sinaí
- Alberto Terrones
- Carlos Rodríguez
- Hugo Ugarte
- Mario C. Lugones
- Percival Murray
- Adolfo Meyer
