= La niña de fuego =

- Release date: 1952
- Country: Argentina
- Language: Spanish

La niña de fuego (The fire girl) is a 1952 film of the classical era of Argentine cinema.

== Cast ==
- Lolita Torres – Fernanda / Fernando
- Ricardo Passano – Pocho
- Mario Baroffio – Cipriano Albaicín
- César Fiaschi – Pereda
- Domingo Márquez – Andrés
- Antonio Martelo
- Helena Cortesina
- Alfonso Pisano – Ramallo
- Arsenio Perdiguero – mr. José
- Antonio Martiánez – Captain
- Delfy Miranda – Ofelia
- Noemí Laserre – María de los Cantares
- Arturo Arcari
- Semillita – box spectator
- Helena Cortesina – Clotilde
- Carlos Mendi – Marino
- Ofelia Cortesina
- Luis Laneri
- Dante Liguori
