= Bad Company (1986 film) =

1986 Argentine film directed by José Santiso

- Directed by: José Santiso
- Written by: José Santiso; Jacobo Langsner (play)
- Starring: Federico Luppi; Bárbara Mújica; Miguel Ángel Solá
- Edited by: Armando Blanco; Jorge Valencia
- Release date: 1986
- Running time: 92 min.
- Country: Argentina
- Language: Spanish

Bad Company (Spanish: Malayunta) is a 1986 Argentine drama film written and directed by José Santiso and starring Federico Luppi, Bárbara Mújica and Miguel Ángel Solá.

The film is based on a play by Jacobo Langsner called Pater noster, which premiered in Uruguay in 1977 and was first staged in Argentina in 1981 by Teatro Abierto. The film is a "thinly veiled allegory of life under a dictatorship" and treats the topic of the Dirty War by denouncing "the complicity of large sectors of the civil population with the military." It earned praise as "the most profound, disturbing, uncompromising, and novel of all the films of the new democratic period to examine the years of terror."

== Synopsis ==
An impoverished middle-class couple rents a room in an apartment from an artist. However, the artist, who leads a debauched lifestyle, imposes restrictions on the couple, such as prohibiting them from cooking and disturbing their sleep with his nocturnal activities. Surprisingly, the artist charges them an exorbitant rent that covers the entire apartment. When the husband is attacked by a deranged individual who appears to be the artist's brother, a turning point occurs. The couple seizes control of the apartment and restrains the artist to a chair using barbed wire. In an attempt to reform his unhealthy lifestyle (consisting mainly of bread and milk), they force him to consume red meat. Ultimately, they resort to dismembering him. As the narrative unfolds, the audience's perspective evolves: their initial sympathy for the couple gives way to the realization that they symbolize the complicit Argentinian bourgeoisie, complicit in the "systematic slaughter of some 30,000 students, trade unionists, schoolteachers, and others accused of being 'terrorists.'"

== Cast ==
- Federico Luppi as Bernardo
- Bárbara Mujica as Amalia
- Miguel Ángel Solá as Néstor
- Edgardo Moreira as Puppeteer
- Florencia Firpo as Angelita
- Jorge Petraglia as Blind Man
- Silvia Milet
- Susana Nova
- Jorge Capobianco
- Martín Droso
- Gianni Fiori
- Mónica Lacoste
- Laura Orgambide
- Rubén Santagada
