= El Juicio de Dios =

- Directed by: Hugo Fili
- Written by: Antonio Di Benedetto, Hugo Fili
- Edited by: Remo Charbonello
- Release date: 1979
- Country: Argentina
- Language: Spanish

El Juicio de Dios is a 1979 Argentine drama film directed by Hugo Fili.

== Cast ==
- Horacio Bruno
- Jorge De La Riestra
- Ángel Magaña
- Alba Múgica
- Hugo Mújica
- Romualdo Quiroga
- Abel Sáenz Buhr
- Jorge Velurtas
