= An Evening of Love =

1943 film

- Directed by: Rogelio Geissmann
- Written by: Rogelio Geissmann
- Produced by: Rogelio Geissmann
- Starring: Floren Delbene; Ana Arneodo
- Cinematography: Jorge Friedman
- Edited by: Rogelio Geissmann
- Music by: Julián Bautista
- Release date: October 7, 1943
- Running time: 65 minutes
- Country: Argentina
- Language: Spanish

An Evening of Love (Spanish:Un Atardecer de amor) is a 1943 Argentine romantic drama film of the classical era of Argentine cinema, directed and written by Rogelio Geissmann.The film starred Floren Delbene and Ana Arneodo.

== Cast ==

- Ana Arneodo
- Sara Barrié
- Gloria Bayardo
- Nélida Bilbao
- Eloísa Cañizares
- Adrián Cuneo
- Floren Delbene
- Lidia Denis
- Jorge Salcedo
- Judith Sulian
- Martha Donnia Burton (girl)
