= The Corpse Breaks a Date =

1944 film

- Directed by: Pierre Chenal
- Written by: Pierre Chenal; Miguel Mileo; Carlos A. Olivari; Sixto Pondal Ríos
- Produced by: Edmo Cominetti
- Starring: Ángel Magaña; Nélida Bilbao; Sebastián Chiola
- Cinematography: Francis Boeniger
- Edited by: Carlos Rinaldi
- Music by: Lucio Demare
- Production companies: Associated Argentine Artists; Estudios Baires
- Release date: 7 December 1944
- Running time: 80 minutes
- Country: Argentina
- Language: Spanish

The Corpse Breaks a Date (Spanish: El muerto falta a la cita) is a 1944 Argentine thriller film of the classical era of Argentine cinema, directed by Pierre Chenal and starring Ángel Magaña, Nélida Bilbao and Sebastián Chiola. Future star Tilda Thamar appears in a supporting role. It was made in Buenos Aires and shot on location around the city. The film's sets were designed by the art director Raúl Soldi.

== Cast ==
- Ángel Magaña as Daniel Rivero
- Nélida Bilbao as Elena
- Sebastián Chiola as Guido Franchi
- Guillermo Battaglia as Doctor Emilio Quiroga
- Maruja Gil Quesada as Matilde
- Oscar Villa as Gordo
- Tilda Thamar as Nora
- Roberto García Ramos as Raúl Estévez
- Alberto Terrones as Comisario
- René Múgica as Agente

== Bibliography ==
- Maranghello, César. Breve historia del cine argentino. Laertes, 2005.
- Plazaola, Luis Trelles. South American Cinema: Dictionary of Film Makers. La Editorial, UPR, 1989.
