= Narciso Ibáñez Menta =

Spanish actor

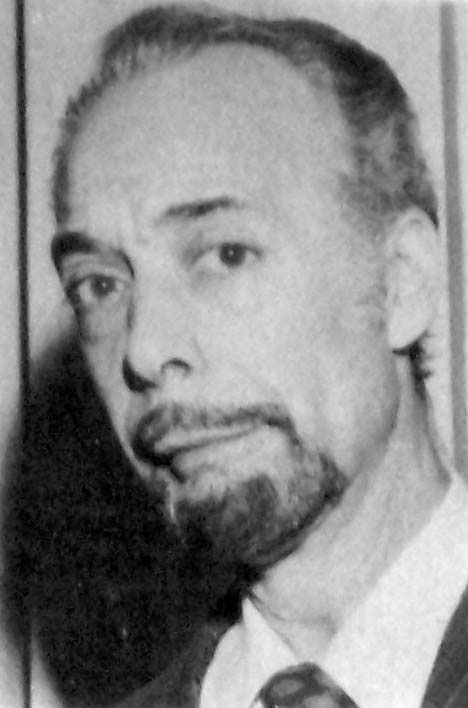
- Narciso Ibáñez Menta
- Born: 25 August 1912; Langreo (Asturias), Spain
- Died: 15 May 2004 (aged 91); Madrid, Spain
- Occupation: Actor
- Spouse: Pepita Serrador
- Children: Narciso Ibáñez Serrador

Narciso Ibáñez Menta (Spanish pronunciation: [naɾˈθisojˈβaɲeθ ˈmenta]; 25 August 1912 – 15 May 2004) was a Spanish theatre, film, and television actor. He developed much of his career in Argentina, during the Golden Age of Argentine cinema of the 1930s and 1940s.

== Biography ==
Born in Langreo, Asturias, Spain, Ibáñez Menta made his first stage appearance at the age of seven at the Teatro La Comedia of Buenos Aires. He worked in both theatre and film in Argentina until 1964, when he returned to Spain and developed a successful television career. In both Argentina and Spain, he was particularly prominent in suspense and horror subjects.

In 1934, he married the Argentine actress Pepita Serrador, a member of a theatre family. In 1935 they had a son, Narciso Ibáñez Serrador, who became a director, writer and actor, and directed the Spanish television series Historias para no dormir (1973), El Televisor (1974) and El fin empezó ayer (1982) in which his father starred.

Films featuring Ibáñez Menta included Historia de crímenes (1942), La Bestia debe morir (1952), Tres citas con el destino (1953), Obras maestras del terror (1960), Shoot Twice (1969), La saga de los Drácula (1972), Los muchachos de antes no usaban arsénico (1976), Viaje al más allá (1980), Sal gorda (1983), and Más allá de la muerte (1984).

His last film role was in ¡Qué vecinos tan animales! (1998).

His health gradually deteriorated, to the point that in 1996 he was implanted with a pacemaker and spent the last few years prostrate in bed. He died on 15 May 2004 at the Hospital de Madrid, at the age of 91.

His body was cremated in the Cemetery of La Almudena in Madrid on 16 May 2004.

In 2008, Argentine cinema director Gustavo Leonel Mendoza exhibited a documentary about Ibañez Menta's life, titled Nadie inquietó más ('Nobody disturbed more'). In 2010, Argentine writers Leandro D'Ambrosio and Marcelo Rodríguez a.k.a. "Gillespi" published a biography of the actor, El artesano del miedo ['The Craftsman of Fear'].

== Filmography ==
=== Films ===
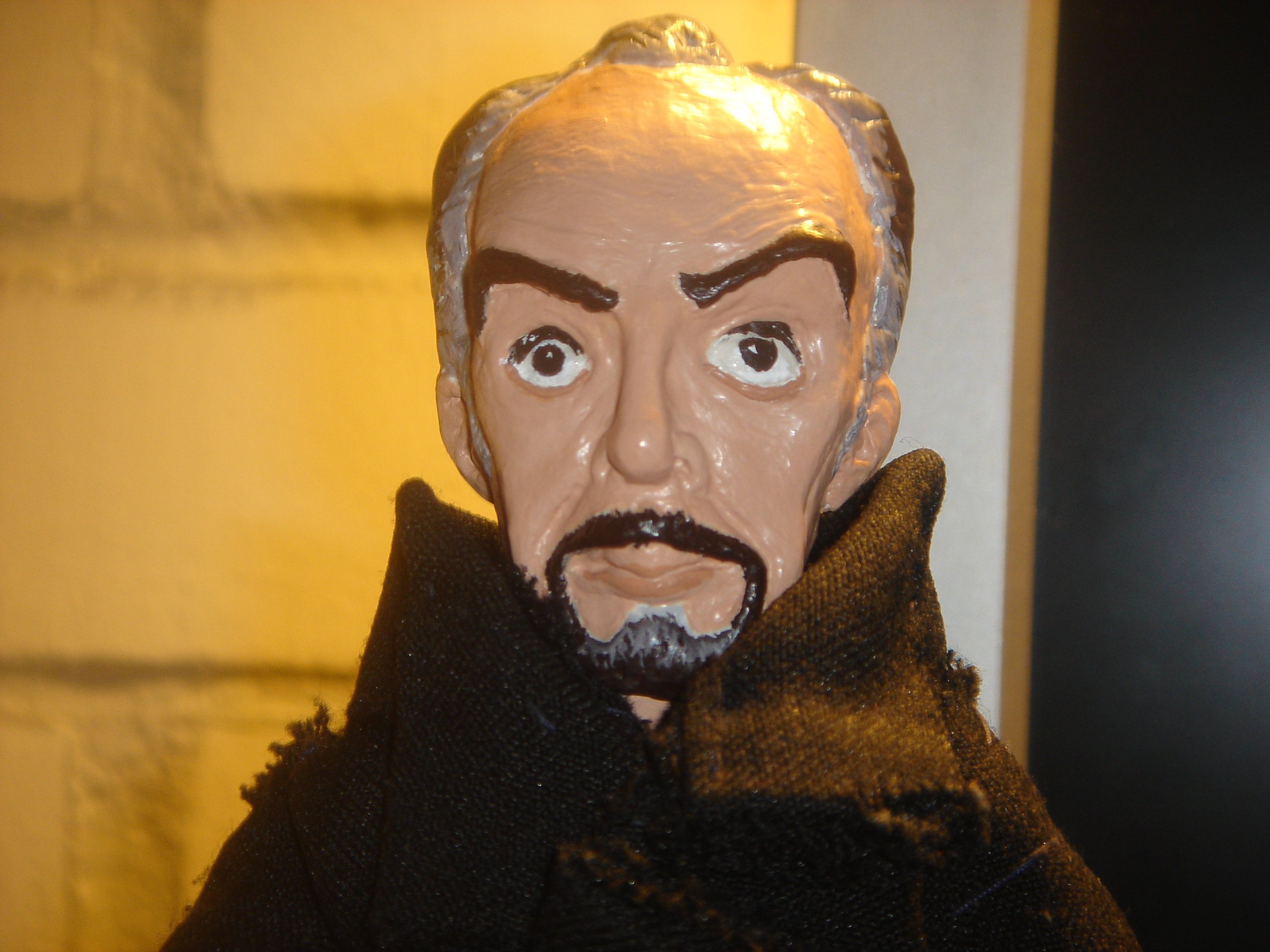
Narciso Ibáñez Menta action figure.

- A Light in the Window (1942)
- Historia de crímenes (1942)
- Cuando en el cielo pasen lista (1945)
- El que recibe las bofetadas (1947)
- Corazón (1947)
- Vidalita (1949)
- Almafuerte (1949)
- La muerte está mintiendo (1950)
- Derecho viejo (1951)
- La calle junto a la luna (1951)
- La bestia debe morir (1952)
- End of the Month (1953)
- Un hombre cualquiera (1954)
- Tres citas con el destino (1954)
- Cinco gallinas y el cielo (1957)
- Procesado 1040 (1958)
- Obras Maestras del Terror (1960)
- La cigarra no es un bicho (1964)
- Pasto de fieras (1967)
- Due volte Giuda (1969)
- Aventura en Hong Kong (1969)
- La saga de los Dracula (1973)
- Odio mi cuerpo (1974)
- Los muchachos de antes no usaban arsénico (1976)
- Lucecita (1976)
- Sabado, chica, motel, que lio aquel (1976)
- Tres dias de noviembre (1977)
- Préstamela esta noche (1978)
- Viaje al más allá (1980)
- Yo hice a Roque III 1980
- El retorno del hombre lobo (1981)
- Los líos de Estefanía (1982)
- El ser (1982)
- Sal gorda (1984)
- Más allá de la muerte (1986)
- Sólo se muere dos veces (1997)
- ¡Qué vecinos tan animales! (1998)

=== Television ===
- Los premios nobel (1958)
- Obras maestras del terror (1960)
- El fantasma de la ópera (1960)
- Arsenio Lupin (1961)
- ¿Es usted el asesino? (Argentinian version) (1961)
- La pata de mono (1961)
- El muñeco maldito (1962)
- Mañana puede ser verdad (Argentinian version) (1962)
- El sátiro (1963)
- Estudio 3 (1964)
- La Historia de San Michel (1964)
- Mañana puede ser verdad (Spanish version) (1964)
- Historias para no dormir (1965–1982)
- Historia de la frivolidad (1967)
- ¿Es usted el asesino? (1967)
- El hombre que volvió de la muerte (1969)
- Un pacto con los brujos (1969)
- El premio (1969)
- Estudio 1 (1969-1980)
- Robot (1970)
- El Monstruo no ha muerto (1970)
- Otra vez Dracula (1970)
- Alta comedia (1970–1972)
- Mañana puedo morir (1979)
- El pulpo negro (1985)
