= Berta Aliana =

Argentine actress and tango singer

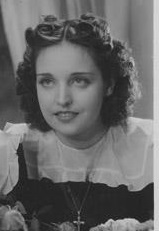
- Aliana in 1938
- Years active: 1938–1943

Berta Aliana was an Argentine actress and tango singer.

== Filmography ==
| Year | Title | Role | Notes |
|---|---|---|---|
| 1938 | Women Who Work | Dora | |
| 1938 | Jettatore | FLORIATS #1 | |
| 1939 | Margarita, Armando y su padre | Mucama | |
| 1940 | Marriage in Buenos Aires | La Mucama | |
| 1940 | The Tango Star | Clota | |
| 1940 | Los Celos de Cándida | | |
| 1940 | La suerte llama tres veces | | |
| 1943 | La piel de zapa | | final role |

== Bibliography ==
- Blanco Pazos, Roberto; Clemente, Raúl (1997). Diccionario de actrices del cine argentino 1933–1997 (in Spanish) (1 ed.). Buenos Aires Ediciones Corridor. p. 110. ISBN 950-05-1077-4.
