= End of the Month =

1953 film

- Directed by: Enrique Cahen Salaberry
- Written by: Ariel Cortazzo
- Based on: End of the Month by Paola Riccora
- Starring: Narciso Ibáñez Menta; Paola Loew; Ana Arneodo
- Cinematography: Humberto Peruzzi
- Edited by: José Cardella; Higinio Vecchione
- Music by: Juan Ehlert
- Production company: Argentina Sono Film
- Distributed by: Argentina Sono Film
- Release date: 22 January 1953
- Running time: 91 minutes
- Country: Argentina
- Language: Spanish

End of the Month (Spanish: Fin de mes) is a 1953 Argentine comedy film of the classical era of Argentine cinema, directed by Enrique Cahen Salaberry and starring Narciso Ibáñez Menta, Paola Loew and Ana Arneodo. The film's sets were designed by the art director Carlos T. Dowling.

== Synopsis ==
A poor but conformist bank cashier is tempted to break with his honest routine.

== Casyt ==
- Narciso Ibáñez Menta
- Paola Loew
- Ana Arneodo
- Héctor Calcaño
- Alberto Berco
- Ubaldo Martínez
- Jesús Pampín
- Maurice Jouvet
- Gloria Ferrandiz
- Cayetano Biondo

== Bibliography ==
- Brisky, Norman. La Cultura popular del peronismo. Editorial Cimarrón, 1973.
- Maranghello, César. Breve historia del cine argentino. Celesa, 2005.
