= Jettatore (1938 film) =

- Directed by: Luis Bayón Herrera
- Written by: Luis Bayón Herrera; Gregorio de Laferrere
- Produced by: Luis Bayón Herrera
- Starring: Tito Lusiardo; Pedro Quartucci
- Cinematography: Francisco Múgica
- Edited by: Francisco Múgica
- Music by: Alberto Soifer
- Distributed by: Lumiton
- Release date: 1938
- Running time: 78 minute
- Country: Argentina
- Language: Spanish

Jettatore is a 1938 Argentine musical drama film directed by Luis Bayon Herrera during the Golden Age of Argentine cinema. The film premiered in Buenos Aires on August 10, 1938 and starred Tito Lusiardo and Pedro Quartucci. It is a tango musical and is based on a play by Gregorio de Laferrere. The cinematography and editing of the film were performed by Francisco Múgica, who also served as a technical advisor to the films.

== Synopsis ==
The story follows the misadventures of an individual to whom other people begin to attribute a baleful magnetic influence that brings bad luck to all those who get involved with him. This belief is the result of a superstition that was widespread in Buenos Aires at the time.

== Cast ==
- Tito Lusiardo
- Enrique Serrano
- Severo Fernández
- Pedro Quartucci
- Benita Puértolas
- Alita Román
- Hilda Sour
- Alímedes Nelson
- Juan Mangiante
- José Alfayate
- María Armand
- Berta Aliana
- Nélida Bilbao
- Ely Nolby
- Enrique Mara
- Amery Darbón
