= The Husband That Is Necessary to Follow =

- Screenshot
- French: Al marido hay que seguirlo
- Directed by: Augusto Cesar Vatteone
- Written by: Tito Insausti; Arnaldo Malfatti
- Produced by: Augusto Cesar Vatteone
- Starring: Francisco Álvarez; Pedro Quartucci
- Cinematography: Carlos Torres Ríos
- Edited by: Javier Aurelio Ruggieri
- Music by: Alejandro Gutiérrez del Barrio
- Distributed by: Cosmos Films
- Release date: 14 September 1948
- Running time: 84 minute
- Countries: Argentina
- Language: Spanish

The Husband That Is Necessary to Follow (Spanish: Al marido hay que seguirlo) is a 1948 Argentine film of the classical era of Argentine cinema, directed by Augusto Cesar Vatteone and written by Tito Insausti. The film starred Francisco Álvarez, Ana Arneodo, Mapy Cortés and Pedro Quartucci.

== Cast ==
- Francisco Álvarez
- Ana Arneodo
- Yvonne Bastien (as Ivonne De Lys)
- Fernando Campos
- Mapy Cortés
- Néstor Deval
- Enrique García Satur
- Iris Portillo
- Pedro Quartucci
- Alberto Terrones

Francisco Álvarez and Mapy Cortés

== Release and acclaim ==
The film premiered on 14 September 1948.
