= Pasó en mi barrio =

- Directed by: Mario Soffici
- Written by: Carlos A. Olivari; Sixto Pondal Ríos
- Produced by: Eduardo Bedoya; Héctor Olivera
- Starring: Tita Merello
- Cinematography: Francis Boeniger
- Edited by: Ricardo Rodríguez Nistal; Atilio Rinaldi
- Release date: 20 December 1951
- Running time: 78 minutes
- Country: Argentina
- Language: Spanish

Pasó en mi barrio is a 1951 Argentine film directed by Mario Soffici during the classical era of Argentine cinema. It was entered into the 1952 Cannes Film Festival, where it was one of the nominees for the Grand Prize of the Festival.

== Cast ==
- Tita Merello
- Mario Fortuna
- Mirtha Torres
- Alberto de Mendoza
- Daniel Tedeschi
- Benito Cibrián
- Sergio Renán
- Paride Grandi
- Francisco Audenino
- Carlos Cotto
- Carmen Giménez
- Tito Grassi - El Negro
- Eduardo de Labar
- Hugo Lanzilotta
- Domingo Mania
- Luis Medina Castro - Carozo
- Fausto Padín - Taxista
- Juan Carlos Palma - Ricardo
- Alberto Quiles
- Hilda Rey
- Walter Reyna
- Manolita Serra
- Vicente Thomas
