= The Tango Star =

- Directed by: Luis Bayón Herrera
- Written by: Ariel Cortazzo; Conrado de Koller; Luis Bayón Herrera
- Starring: Hugo del Carril; Amanda Ledesma; Berta Aliana; Nélida Bilbao
- Cinematography: Roque Funes
- Music by: Miguel Caló; Luis Rubinstein; Rodolfo Sciammarella; Alberto Soifer
- Production company: Establecimientos Filmadores Argentinos
- Distributed by: Establecimientos Filmadores Argentinos
- Release date: 7 February 1940
- Running time: 91 minutes
- Country: Argentina
- Language: Spanish

The Tango Star (Spanish:El astro del tango) is a 1940 Argentine musical film of the Golden Age of Argentine cinema directed by Luis Bayón Herrera and starring Hugo del Carril, Amanda Ledesma and Berta Aliana. A tango star enjoys a relationship with a young woman from a wealthy family.

== Cast ==
- Hugo del Carril
- Amanda Ledesma
- Berta Aliana
- Nélida Bilbao
- María Esther Buschiazzo
- Morena Chiolo
- Adrián Cuneo
- Amery Darbón
- Alfredo Jordan
- Elisa Labardén
- Regina Laval
- Ana María Lynch
- Juan Mangiante
- Carlos Rosingana
- Aída Vignan

== Bibliography ==
- Rist, Peter H. Historical Dictionary of South American Cinema. Rowman & Littlefield, 2014.
