= Ana María Campoy =

Argentine actress

Ana María Campoy (26 July 1925 – 8 July 2006) was an Argentine actress of Colombian origin. She was born in Bogotá, the child of a couple of actors who had a theatre company in Spain. She began acting at the age of 4, and at 17 she formed her own company.

In 1947, while in Guatemala, she married Argentine actor and director Pepe Cibrián, with whom she had two sons. Two years later they settled in Argentina. There, Campoy acted on TV, cinema and theatre; she also published a book of love stories. She received two Martín Fierro Awards, a Konex Award for her comedy acting, and a Podestá Award to her career in theatre.

Campoy died of recurring pneumonia in a hospital of Buenos Aires in 2006, two weeks before turning 81.

== Filmography ==
- 1937: Aurora de esperanza
- 1942: La madre guapa
- 1942: Un marido a precio fijo
- 1943: A Sight of Light
- 1944: Doce lunas de miel
- 1944: Adam's Fault
- 1944: Paraíso sin Eva
- 1944: El testamento del virrey
- 1944: Ella, él y sus millones
- 1945: Espronceda
- 1945: Tierra sedienta
- 1945: Cinco lobitos
- 1945: Un hombre de negocios
- 1946: Es peligroso asomarse al exterior
- 1946: Cais do Sodré
- 1947: Five Faces of Woman
- 1951: The Strange Case of the Man and the Beast
- 1951: Especialista en señoras
- 1951: Teleteatro de suspenso (TV Series)
- 1951: Néstor Villegas vigila (TV Series)
- 1953: Como te quiero Ana (TV Series, 3 episodes)
- 1954: Siete gritos en el mar
- 1956: Cubitos de hielo
- 1958: Cómo te odio, Pepe (TV Series)
- 1960: Topaze (TV Mini Series, 10 episodes)
- 1964: Conjugal Pleasures
- 1965: Show Rambler (TV Movie)
- 1966: Con el más puro amor
- 1967: Las pirañas
- 1971: Teatro 13 (TV Series, 1 episode)
- 1970-1971: Alta comedia (TV Series, 9 episodes)
- 1974: Mi hombre sin noche (TV Series, 19 episodes)
- 1974: Humor a la italiana (TV Series,1 episode)
- 1976: Juan que reía
- 1977: El humor de Niní Marshall (TV Movie)
- 1978: Te sigo queriendo Ana (TV Series)
- 1978: Chau, amor mío (TV Series)
- 1981: La Torre en jaque (TV Series, 9 episodes)
- 1983: Compromiso (TV Series, 10 episodes)
- 1986: El infiel (TV Series, 40 episodes)
- 1986: Las lobas
- 1987: La cuñada (TV Series, 264 episodes)
- 1988: Amándote (TV Series, 112 episodes)
- 1989: Las hormigas (TV Series)
- 1989: The Strange Lady (TV Series, 120 episodes)
- 1990:Stress (TV Series, 7 episodes)
- 1991: Stress Internacional (TV Series, 3 episodes)
- 1991: El gordo y el flaco (TV Series, 19 episodes)
- 1992: Soy Gina (TV Series, 90 episodes)
- 1992: Peor es nada (TV Series, 1 episode)
- 2003: Dr. Amor (TV Series, 119 episodes)
