= Los guerrilleros (1965 film) =

Los Guerrilleros
- Directed by: Lucas Demare
- Release date: 1965
- Running time: 101 minute
- Country: Argentina
- Language: Spanish

Los Guerrilleros is a 1965 Argentine film directed by Lucas Demare.

== Cast ==
- Martín Andrade
- Carlos Víctor Andriss
- Ernesto Bianco
- Juan Buryúa Rey as Gendarme 2
- Rafael Chumbito as Gendarme 3
- Luis Corradi as Chofer
- María José Demare
- Arturo García Buhr
- José María Langlais
- Enrique Liporace
- Víctor Martucci as Padre de Fernando
- Luis Medina Castro
- Reynaldo Mompel
- Bárbara Mujica
- Ignacio Quirós
- Marilina Ross
- Raúl Szabó
- Olga Zubarry
