= Domingo Márquez =

Argentine actor

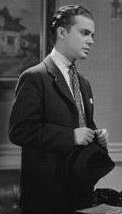
- Born: Uruguay
- Years active: 1940–1972

Domingo Márquez was an Argentine actor. He starred in films like The Best Father in the World (1941), Los martes, orquídeas (1941), Filomena Marturano (1950), and The Fire Girl (1952). He had a minor role in the acclaimed Silver Condor-winning 1943 film Juvenilia.

== Career ==
Márquez was featured up to 40 (33) films, in supporting actor and protagonist roles. He co-starred with actors Mirtha Legrand, Maria Esther Buschiazzo, Betty Colman, Agustín Barrios, Tito Alonso, Julio Renato, Nélida Solá, Nélida Bilbao, Eduardo Rudy, Armando Durán, among others.

In 1946, he joined the list of the Democratic Actors Association, during the government of Juan Domingo Perón, and whose board of directors was composed of Pablo Racioppi, Lydia Lamaison, Pascual Nacaratti, Alberto Barcel and Domingo Mania.

=== Filmography ===
- 1940: Un señor mucamo
- 1940: Ha entrado un ladrón como Jorge Grondona
- 1941: El mejor papá del mundo
- 1941: Los martes, orquídeas
- 1942: El tercer beso
- 1942: Adolescencia
- 1942: Tú eres la paz
- 1943: Juvenilia
- 1944: Nuestra Natacha
- 1944: Su mejor alumno
- 1946: El gran amor de Bécquer
- 1946: Rosa de América
- 1946: Milagro de amor
- 1946: La sombra del pasado
- 1947: La copla de la Dolores
- 1947: Los hijos del otro
- 1948: Recuerdos de un ángel
- 1948: Rodríguez supernumerario
- 1949: La cuna vacía
- 1950: Bólidos de acero
- 1950: Filomena Marturano
- 1951: El mucamo de la niña
- 1951: Tierra extraña
- 1952: La niña de fuego
- 1953: ¡Qué noche de casamiento!
- 1953: La tía de Carlitos
- 1954: Romeo y Julita
- 1956: Sangre y acero
- 1965: Canuto Cañete, detective privado como un prefecto
- 1966: De profesión sospechosos...Carlos
- 1966: La cómplice como un empleado de la fábrica
- 1968: El novicio rebelde
- 1969: Corazón contento
- 1971: Siempre te amaré
- 1971: Aquellos años locos
- 1972: Juan Manuel de Rosas

== Theater ==
Witness to the gallows, with the Argentine comedy company headed by Amelia Bence, with Pablo Acciardi and Alberto Berco.

Carlos's Aunt (1951), by Brandon Thomas, directed by Enrique Santos Discépolo at the Casino Theater, along with Pablo Palitos, Gloria Ugarte, Patricia Castell, Agustín Barrios, Lalo Malcolm, Sara Olmos, María Armand and Tito Licausi.

Filomena Marturano (1948), with a company headed by Tita Merello and Guillermo Battaglia, at the Teatro Politeama, directed by Luis Mottura. Also in the cast were Esther Bustamante, Agustín Barrios, Betty Colman, Tito Alonso, Edna Norrell and Alberto de Mendoza.
