= Pepita Serrador =

Argentine actress

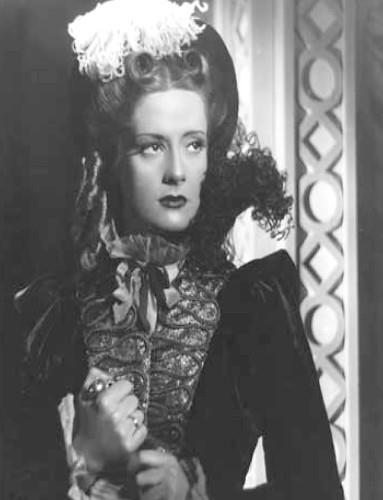
- Born: Josefina Serrador Marí; 2 March 1913; Buenos Aires, Argentina
- Died: 24 May 1964 (aged 51); Madrid, Spain
- Occupation: Actress
- Years active: 1924–1960 (film)
- Spouse: Narciso Ibáñez Menta
- Children: Narciso Ibáñez Serrador

Josefina Serrador Marí (March 2, 1913 – May 24, 1964), better known as Pepita Serrador, was an Argentine film actress of the Golden Age of Argentine cinema. She was married to the actor Narciso Ibáñez Menta, and the mother of the film director Narciso Ibáñez Serrador. She divorced her husband in 1947.

== Biography ==
In Buenos Aires she married in 1934 the Spanish actor Narciso Ibáñez Menta, with whom he had a son, Narciso Ibáñez Serrador, director of television programs.

As for his personal and family life, in 1940 he separated and later joined the Argentine comic actor known as Ali Salem de Baraja. Sister of the actors Esteban, Teresa and Juan Serrador. He also had another sister, Nora. First obtained some successes with works that later would become classics like Bodas de sangre, La salvaje or some time later Approved in innocence written by his son "Chicho", under the pseudonym Luis Peñafiel. He made great roles in films such as Women who work and Girls who study.

She died at 51 years old victim of cancer. She expressed as a last wish, her desire to be buried in Granada, where her remains rest in the San José Cemetery.

== Filmography ==
Year	Title	Role	Notes
1924	La trepadora		
1938	Women Who Work	Luisa	
1939	Una mujer de la calle		
1939	Muchachas que estudian	Ana Del Valle	
1939	Frente a la vida		
1940	La luz de un fósforo	Graciela	
1941	Embrujo		
1941	Amor		
1942	The Kids Grow Up		
1942	The Road of the Llamas		
1943	Punto negro		
1943	Oro en la mano		
1944	El camino de las llamas		
1947	Five Faces of Woman	Ivonne Parker	
1958	Muchachas en vacaciones	Miss Alicia Stanton	
1958	La muralla	Matilde	
1960	Tu marido nos engaña		
1960	The Whole Year is Christmas	Señora Echagüe	(segment "El hermano"), (final film role)

== Bibliography ==
- Antonio Lazaro-Reboll. Spanish Horror Film. Edinburgh University Press, 2012.
