= Catita es una dama =

- Film poster
- Directed by: Julio Saraceni
- Written by: Abel Santacruz
- Starring: Niní Marshall, Augusto Codecá, Berta Ortegosa
- Cinematography: Vicente Cosentino
- Edited by: Gerardo Rinaldi, Antonio Ripoll
- Music by: Tito Ribero
- Release date: 1956
- Running time: 80 minutes
- Country: Argentina
- Language: Spanish

Catita es una dama is a 1956 Argentine comedy film directed by Julio Saraceni and starring Niní Marshall.

== Plot ==
On this occasion, the trio made up of Catita, Semillita and Augusto Codecá (who plays an amateur boxer), after the conventillo has burned down due to Catita's negligence, take all the tenants of the tenement to live temporarily in their employer's house, A millionaire. This gives rise to numerous entanglements, and they even summon spirits due to their misinterpretation of their patron's death in a mistaken plane crash.

== Cast ==
- Niní Marshall as Catita
- Augusto Codecá
- Carlos Estrada
- Semillita
- Rolando Dumas
- Mirtha Naredo
- Esperanza Otero
- Berta Ortegosa
- Lilian Valmar
- María Esther Corán
- Odina Narietta
- Marta González
- Luis Corradi
- Héctor Rivera
- Carlos Tomkinson
- Luis Calan
- Domingo Mania
