= Marriage in Buenos Aires =

1940 film

- Theatrical release poster
- Directed by: Manuel Romero (director)
- Edited by: Juan Soffici
- Release date: 1940
- Country: Argentina
- Language: Spanish

Marriage in Buenos Aires (Spanish: Casamiento en Buenos Aires) is a 1940 Argentine comedy film directed by Manuel Romero during the Golden Age of Argentine cinema.

== Cast ==
The cast includes:

- Niní Marshall
- Enrique Serrano
- Sabina Olmos
- June Marlowe (Note: Martha Black, not Gisela Goetten.)
- Hilda Sour
- Marcelo Ruggero
- Roberto García Ramos
- Alberto Bello
- Lucy Galián
- Alfredo Jordan
- Berta Aliana
- Mario de Marco

== See also ==
- List of works by Manuel Romero
