= Los martes, orquídeas =

- Theatrical release poster
- Directed by: Francisco Múgica
- Screenplay by: Francisco Oyarzábal
- Story by: Carlos A. Olivari; Sixto Pondal Ríos
- Starring: Mirtha Legrand; Enrique Serrano; Juan Carlos Thorry
- Cinematography: Alfredo Traverso
- Music by: Enrique Delfino
- Production company: Lumiton
- Distributed by: Lumiton
- Release date: 4 June 1941 (Buenos Aires)
- Running time: 84 minutes
- Country: Argentina
- Language: Spanish

Los martes, orquídeas (On Tuesdays, Orchids) is a 1941 Argentine black and white comedy film of the Golden Age directed by Francisco Múgica and starring Mirtha Legrand, Enrique Serrano, Juan Carlos Thorry and Nuri Montsé. It won the Argentine Best Picture award for 1941. It was remade as the Hollywood classic You Were Never Lovelier (1942), starring Fred Astaire and Rita Hayworth.

In a survey of the 100 greatest films of Argentine cinema carried out by the Museo del Cine Pablo Ducrós Hicken in 2000, the film reached the 27th position. In 2022, the film was included in Spanish magazine Fotogramas's list of the 20 best Argentine films of all time.

== Synopsis ==
Elenita, the youngest of four sisters in a well-off family, is a shy, romantic and lonely lady. To try to bring her to life, her father sends her a bouquet of orchids each week, so she will think she has a secret admirer. At the same time, her father hires a young, unemployed actor to pose as the wealthy suitor. Comic situations start to slowly develop, as he dresses in fancy clothes, rides a horse and attends a party thrown by Elenita's family. By the time the ruse comes to light, the young couple have fallen in love and decided to marry. The father expects that his daughter will reject the young man when she learns he is poor and of Italian origin, but to his dismay she accepts him as he is.

== Cast ==
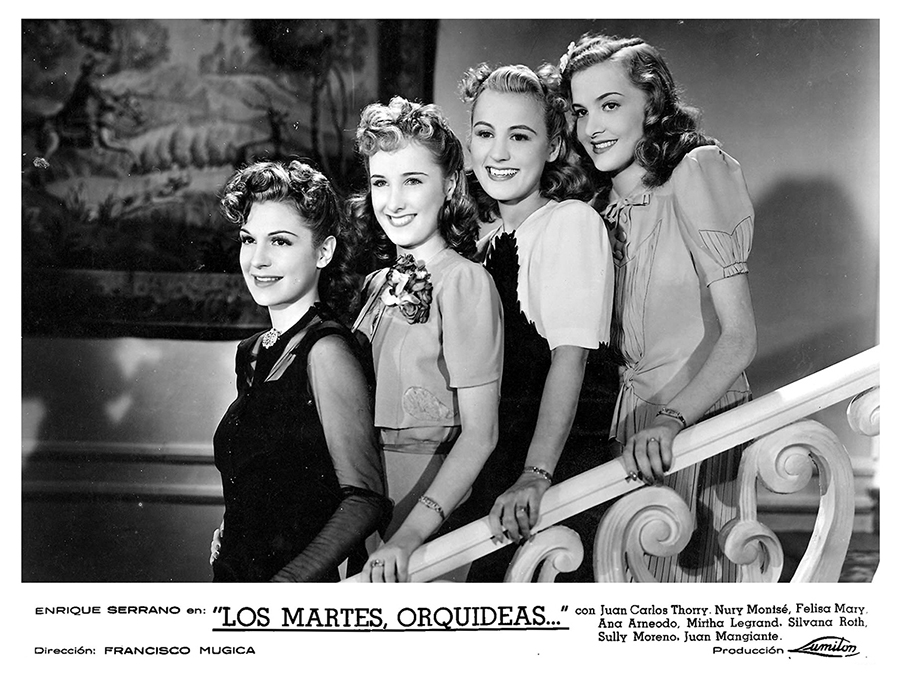
L-R: Zully Moreno, Mirtha Legrand, Nuri Montsé and Silvana Roth in a publicity shot for the film.

The full cast was:

- Enrique Serrano
- Juan Carlos Thorry
- Nuri Montsé
- Felisa Mary
- Mirtha Legrand (as Elenita)
- Ana Arneodo
- Silvana Roth
- Zully Moreno
- Juan Mangiante
- Eva Guerrero
- René Pocoví
- Horacio Priani
- Domingo Márquez
- Alfredo Jordan
- José Herrero
- Jorge Salcedo

== Production ==
Los martes, orquídeas was produced by Lumiton studios. The script, written by Francisco Oyarzábal, was based on a simple yet effective story by Carlos A. Olivari and Sixto Pondal Ríos.

Although the stars were Enrique Serrano, Juan Carlos Thorry and Nuri Montsé, the film introduced Mirtha Legrand as Elenita, in her first leading role, which catapulted her to fame.

== Reception ==
Los martes, orquídeas was considered the best comedy that had been made in Argentina to date. It launched the career of the young Mirtha Legrand, and remains a classic in the country's film history.

=== Awards ===
The Argentine Academy of Cinematography Arts and Sciences gave a number of awards for the film:

- Best Film: Lumiton
- Best original story: Pondal Sixto Ríos and Carlos Olivari
- Special mention: Mirtha Legrand

== Remakes ==
Columbia Pictures used the film as the basis for You Were Never Lovelier (1942), starring Fred Astaire and Rita Hayworth. It was also remade as the mexican romantic drama Una joven de 16 años ("A Sixteen Year Old Girl", 1963).
