= Pola Alonso =

Argentine actress

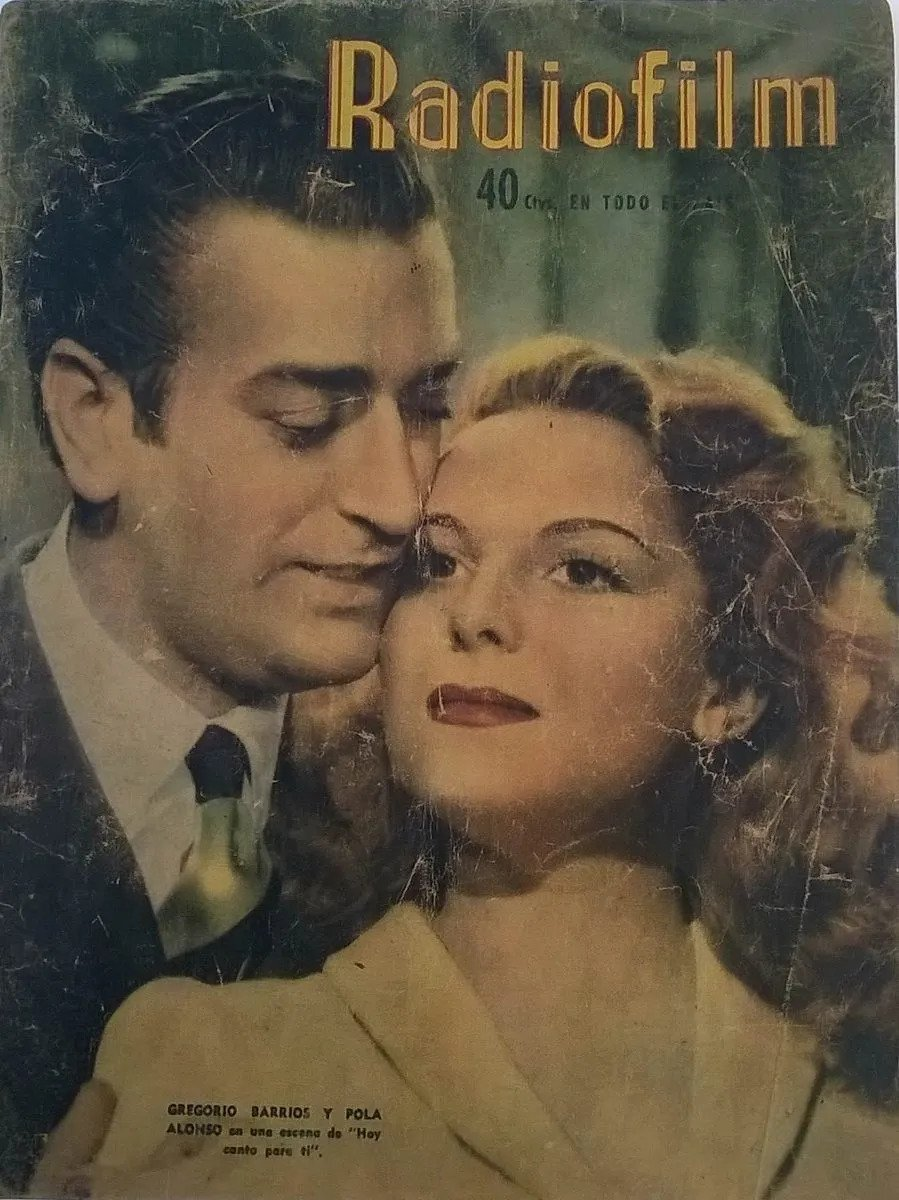
- Gregorio Barrios and Pola Alonso in 'Hoy canto para ti', Radiofilm 1950
- Born: November 16, 1923; Buenos Aires, Argentina
- Died: November 6, 2004 (aged 80)
- Years active: 1942 - circa 1965

Pola Alonso (16 November 1923 – 6 November 2004 Buenos Aires) was a classic Argentine film actress of the 1940s and 1950s.

She appeared in the 1942 film Adolescencia and in 1955's Adiós muchachos.

She was the sister of Argentine actor Tito Alonso.

== Filmography ==
- 1942: Adolescencia
- 1942: Spring Bride
- 1947: Los Hijos del otro
- 1947: Un ángel sin pantalones
- 1948: María de los Ángeles
- 1948: Beatriz
- 1948: Recuerdos de un ángel
- 1948: Mis cinco hijos
- 1949: Almafuerte
- 1949: El ídolo del tango
- 1950: Hoy canto para ti
- 1954: Yo soy el criminal
- 1955: What Happened at Reynoso
- 1955: Adiós muchachos (film)
- 1962: Una jaula no tiene secretos
- 1963: La murga
