= Francisco Urondo =

Argentine writer and member of the Montoneros guerrilla organization

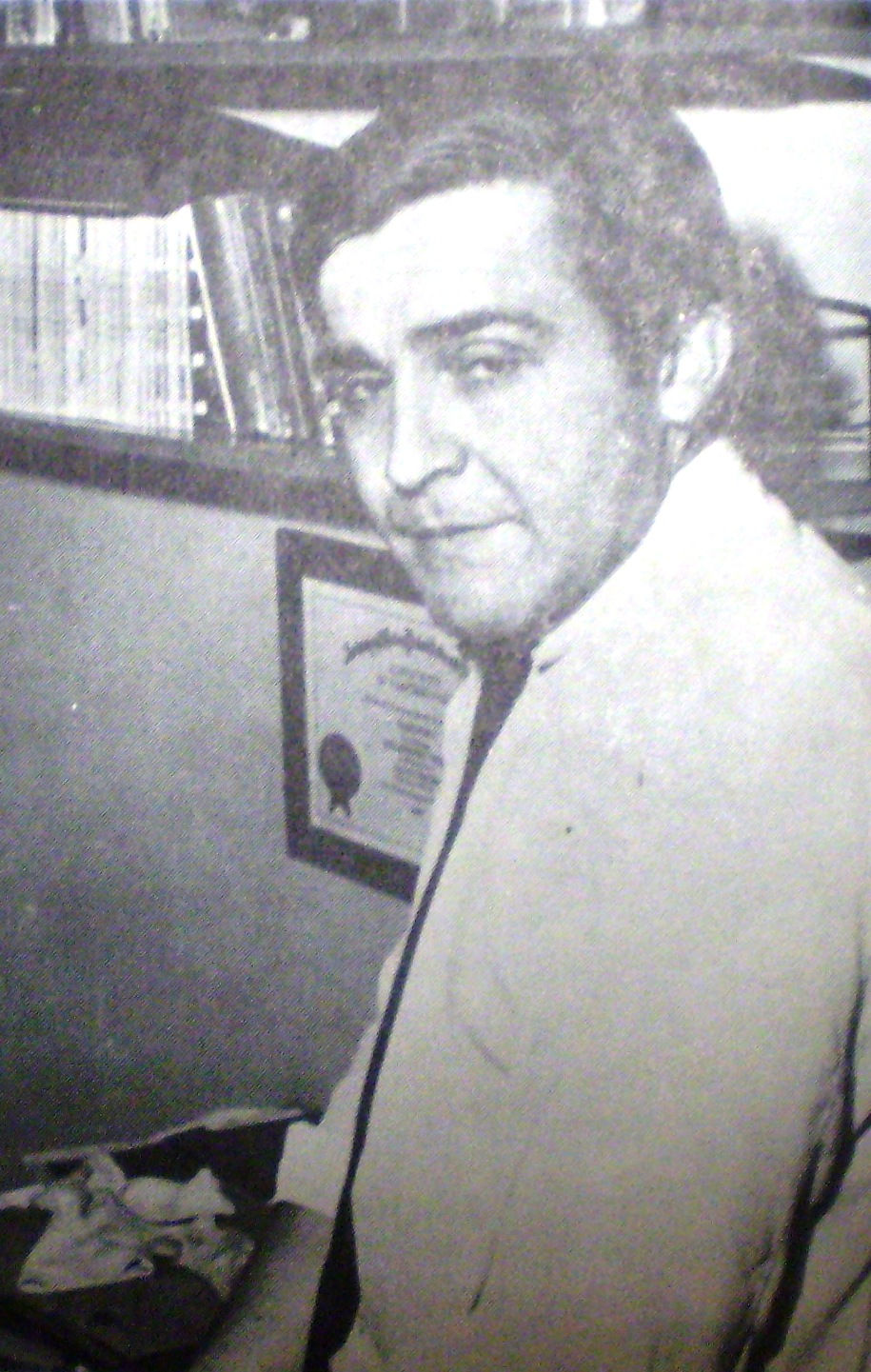
Francisco "Paco" Urondo

Francisco Urondo (10 January 1930 – 17 June 1976) was an Argentine writer and member of the Montoneros guerrilla organization.

Urondo published multiple collections of poetry, short stories, theatrical works, and a novel, as well as La patria fusilada, his famous interview with the survivors of the massacre at Trelew, and his critical essay Veinte años de poesía argentina. He also collaborated in the writing of movie scripts such as Pajarito Gómez (which includes a cameo appearance) and Noche terrible, and adapted for television Flaubert's Madame Bovary, Stendhal's Le Rouge et le Noir, and Eça de Queiroz's Os Maias.

In 1968 he was named General Culture Director for the Santa Fe Province, and in 1973 Director of the Literature Department of the Faculty of Philosophy and Literature of the University of Buenos Aires. As a journalist, he collaborated in several national and international media, among them Primera Plana, Panorama, Crisis, La Opiníon and Noticias. On 17 June 1976, he was assassinated by Argentine Security Forces in an ambush.

== Intellectualism and Militancy ==
At 18, Urondo left home to study chemistry, then law, and then philosophy and letters, but none of these satisfied him. He abandoned academics and went to Buenos Aires where he led a thriving social life and was known among his friends for his lively and intellectual personality. He practiced puppeteering there for a short while.

His writing career developed with the production of his first collections, La Perichole and Historia Antigua, in the 1950s. Too, his militancy grew, first with his participation in the Argentine guerrilla organization FAR, and later the Montoneros. For Urondo, his writing and his militancy were inseparable, despite a mutual mistrust among the two groups. Juan Gelman, a fellow poet and friend, remembers Urondo as saying once that he “took up arms because he was looking for the right word.”

Along with Gelman and poets Roque Dalton and Mario Benedetti, Urondo developed a conversational style of writing in the 60s and 70s simultaneous with the increasingly strained dynamic between the corrupt state and its people. They wrote with frankness and accusation, resisting collective silence by exposing difficult social and political truths—though devoting their words to art and lyricism above all else.

Urondo was imprisoned in 1973 but released; that same year, he published La Patria Fusilada which recounts through interview the stories of the three survivors of the Trelew massacre.

Due to his militancy Urondo had to enter into a clandestine life, taking great pains to disguise himself in public and adopting a pseudonym, Ortiz, after Juan L. Ortiz. He was aware of the danger he was in and had obtained cyanide pills for himself so that, in the event of a compromise, he would not be taken and tortured and forced to betray his friends.

Though he held a position of responsibility within the Montoneros, in 1976 Urondo found himself demoted for internal political reasons and had to be transferred. He asked to not be sent to Santa Fe or to Mendoza because he was well known in both places, but nevertheless they placed him as head of the Mendoza column. Out of options, Urondo left for Mendoza in the beginning of May 1976 with his then-companion Alicia Raboy and their one-year-old child Angela.

== Death ==
On his death, Argentine writer Rodolfo Walsh wrote:

Transferring Paco to Mendoza was a mistake. Cuyo had been a bloodbath since 1975, with no hope for stability. Paco lasted only a few weeks...fearing what would finally happen. There was an encounter with an enemy vehicle, a chase, and a shootout between both cars. Inside were Paco, Lucía (Alicia Raboy) with their daughter, and a female comrade (René Ahualli)....They couldn't break loose. Finally Paco stopped the car...and said, "I took the pill (cyanide) and I already feel sick." [Ahualli] remembers that Lucía said, "But papi, why did you do that?" [Ahualli] escaped between the bullets and arrived wounded to Buenos Aires, days later. Paco was shot in the head twice, though he was probably already dead.

— Rodolfo Walsh, text of December 29, 1976 reproduced by El Porteño in April 1986

== Reparations ==
Urondo's assassins were convicted in 2011. Juan Agustín Oyarzábal Navarro, Eduardo Smahá Borzuk ("Ruso"), Alberto Rodríguez Vázquez (“Pájaro Loco”), and Celustiano Lucero (“Mono”) received the maximum sentence. Dardo Migno received 12 years in prison.

From the trial it was determined that Urondo did not commit suicide by swallowing a cyanide pill, but rather died from a skull fracture caused by a blow to the head with a gun handle that policeman Celustiano Lucero administered. Lucero confessed to this act during the defense.

== Work ==
- Historia Antigua, poetry, 1956.
- Breves, poetry, 1959.
- Lugares, poetry, 1961.
- Nombres, poetry, 1963.
- Todo eso, short-stories, 1966.
- Veraneando y sainete con variaciones, play, 1966.
- Al tacto, short-stories, 1967.
- Del otro lado, poetry, 1967.
- Adolecer, poetry, 1968.
- Veinte años de poesía argentina, essay, 1968.
- Larga distancia, poetry, Madrid, 1971.
- Los pasos previos, novel, 1972.
- La patria fusilada, interviews, 1973.
- Cuentos de batalla, poetry, 1998.
- Poemas, poetry, Visor.
- Obra poética, poetry, Hidalgo, 2006.

=== About Francisco Urondo ===
- The Unfinished Song of Francisco Urondo: When Poetry is Not Enough (Hernán Fontanet, Lanham, MD: University Press of America, 2014) ISBN 978-0-7618-6457-8.
- Francisco Urondo y su poesía: un arma cargada de futuro (Hernán Fontanet, Newark, DE: Juan de la Cuesta - Hispanic Monographs, 2012) ISBN 978-1-58871-213-4.
