= Carlos A. Olivari =

Argentine screenwriter (1902–1955)

Carlos A. Olivari (1902–1955) was an Argentine screenwriter whose career was at its peak in the 1940s.

Olivari wrote the scripts for almost 50 films between 1938 and 1965. Many films that he had written were produced, some of them even ten years after his death.

He worked with director Francisco Múgica including one of his earliest films El Solterón in 1939, also writing the story for the 1942 film Adolescencia.

== Selected filmography ==
- Los martes, orquídeas (1941)
- Persona honrada se necesita (1941)
- Adolescencia (1942)
- The Minister's Daughter (1943)
- The Corpse Breaks a Date (1944)
- Two Angels and a Sinner (1945)
- Cristina (1946)
- Five Faces of Woman (1946)
- The Maharaja's Diamond (1946)
- Musical Romance (1947)
- The Private Life of Mark Antony and Cleopatra (1947)
- Pasó en mi barrio (1951)
