= List of Argentine films of 1950 =

This is a list of films produced in Argentina in 1950:

Argentine films of 1950
Title	Director	Release	Genre
A - B
Abuso de confianza	Mario C. Lugones	21 September	
A La Habana me voy	Luis Bayón Herrera	28 June	
Al compás de tu mentira	Héctor Canziani	22 March	
Argentina de fiesta	Enrique Cahen Salaberry		Documentary
Arrabalera	Tulio Demicheli	25 April	
Arroz con leche	Carlos Schlieper	5 October	
La Balandra Isabel llegó esta tarde	Carlos Hugo Christensen	3 August	
La barca sin pescador	Mario Soffici	28 March	
La barra de la esquina	Julio Saraceni	4 July	
Bólidos de acero	Carlos Torres Ríos	16 March	
Buenos Aires a la vista	Luis Bayón Herrera	20 September	
C - D
La campana nueva	Luis José Moglia Barth	4 January	
Campeón a la fuerza	Enrique Ursini and Juan Sires	5 January	
Captura recomendada	Don Napy	26 July	
El Cielo en las manos	Enrique de Thomas	5 July	
Cinco grandes y una chica	Augusto César Vatteone	28 February	
Cinco locos en la pista	Augusto César Vatteone	15 September	Comedy
Con el sudor de tu frente	Román Viñoly Barreto	7 June	
The Crime of Oribe	Leopoldo Torres Ríos and Leopoldo Torre Nilsson	13 April	drama
Cuando besa mi marido	Carlos Schlieper	17 May	comedia
La Culpa la tuvo el otro	Lucas Demare	5 December	
La Doctora Castañuelas	Luis José Moglia Barth	22 November	
El diablo de las vidalas	Belisario García Villar	inédito	
Don Fulgencio	Enrique Cahen Salaberry	14 September	Comedy
E - L
Escuela de campeones	Ralph Pappier	19 December	
Esposa último modelo	Carlos Schlieper	27 July	comedia
Fangio, el demonio de las pistas	Román Viñoly Barreto	27 October	deportiva
Filomena Marturano	Luis Mottura	20 January	drama
Fuego sagrado	Ricardo Núñez Lissarrague	11 October	
La Fuerza ciega	Luis José Moglia Barth	25 October	
Historia de una noche de niebla	José María Blanco Felis	19 October	
Hombres a precio	Bernardo Spoliansky	16 March	
Hoy canto para ti	Kurt Land	21 June	
Juan Mondiola	Manuel Romero	5 September	
El Ladrón canta boleros	Enrique Cahen Salaberry	2 March	
Lejos del cielo	Catrano Catrani	7 June	
M - P
Madre Alegría	Ricardo Núñez Lissarrague	17 May	
Marihuana	León Klimovsky	27 September	
Mary tuvo la culpa	Carlos Torres Ríos	9 August	
Los millones de Semillita	Frederic Bernheim D´Acosta	unreleased	
El morocho del Abasto (La vida de Carlos Gardel)	Julio C. Rossi	22 March	
La Muerte está mintiendo	Carlos Borcosque	26 July	
Mundo extraño	Francisco Eichhorn	10 May	
Nacha Regules	Luis César Amadori	28 February	
No me digas adiós	Luis José Moglia Barth	10 October	
El otro yo de Marcela	Alberto de Zavalía	13 June	comedia
Los Pérez García	Fernando Bolín and Don Napy	1 February	
Piantadino	Francisco Mugica	30 March	Comedia
Pies Descalzos	Alfredo Julio Grassi	Inconcluso	
El puente	Carlos Gorostiza and Arturo Gemmiti	1 September	
R - Z
El Regreso	Leopoldo Torres Ríos	21 September	
Romance en tres noches	Ernesto Arancibia	12 December	
Sacachispas	Jerry Gómez	12 April	
El Seductor	Luis Bayón Herrera	12 May	
Surcos de sangre	Hugo del Carril	22 June	
Toscanito y los detectives	Antonio Momplet	17 March	
El último payador	Homero Manzi and Ralph Pappier	9 February	
Una Noche en El Relámpago	Miguel Coronatto Paz	unreleased	Comedy
Una Viuda casi alegre	Román Viñoly Barreto	23 November	Comedia
Valentina	Manuel Romero	3 May	
La Vendedora de fantasías	Daniel Tinayre	5 May	Comedia
¿Vendrás a medianoche?	Arturo García Buhr	13 July	
El Zorro pierde el pelo	Mario C. Lugones	16 November	Comedia

== External links and references ==
- Argentine films of 1950 at the Internet Movie Database
