= List of Argentine films of 1955 =

A list of films produced in Argentina in 1955:

Argentine films of 1955
Title	Director	Release	Genre
A - C
Adiós problemas	Kurt Land	18 May	
Adiós muchachos (film)	Armando Bó	29 November	
Al sur del paralelo 42	Catrano Catrani	unreleased	
El amor nunca muere	Luis César Amadori	11 August	
Ayer fue primavera	Fernando Ayala	20 October	
Bacará	Kurt Land	17 November	
El barro humano	Luis César Amadori	2 May	
Canario rojo	Julio Porter	21 July	
Chico Viola Não Morreu	Román Viñoly Barreto	?	
La cigüeña dijo ¡Sí!	Enrique Carreras	22 April	
Codicia	Catrano Catrani	29 June	
Concierto para una lágrima	Julio Porter	18 August	
Cuando Buenos Aires se adormece	Diego Minitti	Inconcluso	
Cuando los duendes cazan perdices	Luis Sandrini	12 January	
El curandero	Mario Soffici	25 August	
D - L
La delatora	Kurt Land	28 June	
Embrujo en Cerros Blancos	Julio C. Rossi	26 May	
En carne viva	Enrique Cahen Salaberry	24 March	
Ensayo final	Mario C. Lugones	27 April	
Escuela de sirenas... y tiburones	Enrique Carreras	4 August	
El fantasma de la opereta	Enrique Carreras	24 June	
Los hermanos corsos	Leo Fleider	1 February	
El hombre que debía una muerte	Mario Soffici	24 March	
Isla hechizada	Adalberto Páez Arenas	unreleased	
El juramento de Lagardere	León Klimovsky	11 December	
Lo que le pasó a Reynoso	Leopoldo Torres Ríos	24 May	
M - P
El mal amor	Luis Mottura	24 February	
Más pobre que una laucha	Julio Saraceni	27 January	
Marianela	Julio Porter	15 September	
Mercado de abasto	Lucas Demare	3 February	
Mi marido hoy duerme en casa	Enrique Carreras	13 October	
Mi marido y mi novio	Carlos Schlieper	24 May	
El millonario	Carlos Rinaldi	28 July	
La mujer desnuda	Ernesto Arancibia	6 October	
La noche de Venus	Virgilio Muguerza	4 May	
La novia	Alberto D'Aversa	Inconcluso	
Pájaros de cristal	Ernesto Arancibia	31 January	
Para vestir santos	Leopoldo Torre Nilsson	4 August	
Los peores del barrio	Julio Saraceni	4 May	
Pobre pero honrado	Carlos Rinaldi	3 November	
Q - Z
La Quintrala, doña Catalina de los Ríos y Lisperguer	Hugo del Carril	26 May	
Reportaje a un cadáver	Belisario García Villar	unreleased	
Requiebro	Carlos Schlieper	25 August	
Ritmo, amor y picardía	Enrique Carreras	2 March	
La simuladora	Mario C. Lugones	27 October	
Sinfonía de juventud	Oscar Carchano	24 February	
La Tierra del Fuego se apaga	Emilio Fernández	1 September	
Un novio para Laura	Julio Saraceni	5 May	
Vida nocturna	Leo Fleider	18 March	

== External links and references ==
- Argentine films of 1955 at the Internet Movie Database
