= Feminine Wiles =

- Directed by: Carlos Schlieper
- Written by: Ariel Cortazzo; Carlos Schlieper; Louis Verneuil (play)
- Starring: Zully Moreno; Ángel Magaña
- Cinematography: Vicente Cosentino
- Edited by: José Cardella
- Music by: Peter Kreuder
- Release date: 6 July 1951
- Running time: 87 minutes
- Country: Argentina
- Language: Spanish

Feminine Wiles (Spanish: Cosas de mujer) is a 1951 Argentine film directed by Carlos Schlieper during the classical era of Argentine cinema. It stars Zully Moreno and Ángel Magaña. It is based on a play by Louis Verneuil.

== Cast ==
- Zully Moreno
- Ángel Magaña
- Esteban Serrador
- Nélida Romero
- Severo Fernández
- Fina Basser
- Carlos Enríquez
- Héctor Méndez
- Aurelia Ferrer
- Pancho Flores
