= Cuando besa mi marido =

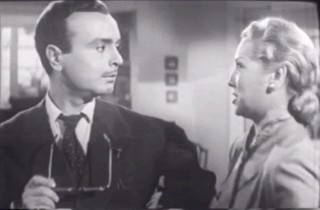
- Directed by: Carlos Schlieper
- Written by: Ariel Cortazzo, Ladislas Fodor
- Edited by: Antonio Ripoll
- Music by: George Andreani
- Release date: 17 May 1950
- Running time: 69 minutes
- Country: Argentina
- Language: Spanish

Cuando besa mi marido is a 1950 Argentine romantic comedy film directed by Carlos Schlieper during the classical era of Argentine cinema.

== Cast ==
- Malisa Zini
- Ángel Magaña
- Juan Carlos Thorry
- Amelita Vargas
- Alberto de Mendoza
- Marga Landova
- Carlos Enríquez
- Aurelia Ferrer
- Nélida Romero
- Hilda Rey
