= School of Mermaids and Sharks =

Escuela de sirenas y tiburones
- Film poster
- Directed by: Enrique Carreras
- Written by: Julio Porter
- Starring: Alfredo Barbieri; Amelita Vargas; Esteban Serrador; Leonor Rinaldi
- Cinematography: Roque Funes
- Edited by: José Gallego
- Music by: Víctor Schlichter
- Production company: Productora General Belgrano
- Distributed by: Productora General Belgrano
- Release date: August 4, 1955
- Running time: 77 minutes
- Country: Argentina
- Language: Spanish

School of Mermaids and Sharks (Escuela de sirenas y tiburones) is a 1955 Argentine film directed by Enrique Carreras and starring Amelia Vargas, Alfredo Barbieri, Esteban Serrador and Leonor Rinaldi. The film was released on August 4, 1955. Enrique Carreras remade the film in 1982 under the title Los fierecillos indomables, starring Alberto Olmedo and Jorge Porcel in the lead roles.

== Plot ==
Misunderstandings, songs and intrigues in a co-ed boarding school.

== Cast ==
- Alfredo Barbieri as student Palmiro Varela
- Amelita Vargas as mermaid Linfor
- Esteban Serrador as Prof. Carlos Fuentes
- Leonor Rinaldi as Srta. Tremebunda
- Francisco Álvarez as head of college
- Marcos Caplán as Palmiro Varela
- Gogó Andreu as Mamertino Álvarez
- Sandra Verani as Clotilde Cáceres
- Tincho Zabala as Pilatos
- Semillita as student
- Alfonso Pisano
- Mario Amaya
- Tono Andreu
- Carmen Campoy as student

== Reception ==
La Razón commented: "The classic and conventional entanglement between students and teachers that is used every time the subject of a school is comically dealt with on the screen." Noticias Gráficas said: "Everything that is reflected on the screen is at the margin of the least demanding common sense." Raúl Manrupe and María Alejandra Portela in their book Un diccionario de films argentinos (1930–1995) wrote (translated from Spanish): "Blockbuster and simplistic, to take advantage of the moment of greatest popularity of the leading couple. The scene of the football match is copied from an identical scene in Avivato ".
