= Mi mujer está loca =

- Directed by: Carlos Schlieper, Enrique Cahen Salaberry
- Written by: Ariel Cortazzo, Carlos Schlieper
- Cinematography: Francis Boeniger
- Edited by: Atilio Rinaldi
- Music by: Tito Ribero
- Release date: 6 March 1952
- Running time: 75 minutes
- Country: Argentina
- Language: Spanish

Mi mujer está loca is a 1952 Argentine romantic comedy film of the classical era of Argentine cinema, directed by Carlos Schlieper and Enrique Cahen Salaberry, and starring Amelia Bence, Alberto Closas, and Amalia Sánchez Ariño.

== Cast ==
- Amelia Bence
- Alberto Closas
- Amalia Sánchez Ariño
- Manuel Perales
- Julián Bourges
- Iván Grondona
- Francisco Pablo Donadío
- Federico Mansilla
- Juan José Porta
- Virginia de la Cruz
