= Los Problemas de papá =

- Directed by: Kurt Land
- Screenplay by: Abel Santa Cruz
- Starring: Enrique Muiño; Amalia Sánchez Ariño; Hilda Rey; Alberto Berco
- Edited by: Higinio Vecchione
- Music by: Tito Ribero; Juan Ehlert
- Distributed by: Argentina Sono Film
- Release date: February 9, 1954
- Running time: 75 minutes
- Country: Argentina
- Language: Spanish

Los Problemas de papá is a 1954 Argentine comedy film directed by Kurt Land during the classical era of Argentine cinema.

== Plot ==
A couple sees their lives altered when they take care of their grandchildren while their children go on a trip.

== Cast ==
- Enrique Muiño
- Amalia Sánchez Ariño
- Alberto Berco
- Hilda Rey
- Alberto Anchart
- Oscar Moyano
- Menchu Quesada
- Fernando Siro
- Egle Martin
- Víctor Martucci
- Mar Lácar
- Delfy Miranda
- Osvaldo Domecq
- Aída Villadeamigo
- Juan Alighieri
- Osvaldo Terranova
- Cayetano Biondo
- Santiago Rebull
