= Vidalita =

1949 Argentine film

- Spanish theatrical release poster
- Directed by: Luis Saslavsky
- Screenplay by: Luis Saslavsky (story and dialogue); Ariel Cortazzo (screenplay and dialogue)
- Starring: Mirtha Legrand; Narciso Ibáñez Menta; Fernando Lamas
- Cinematography: Pablo Tabernero
- Edited by: Gerardo Rinaldi
- Music by: Juan Ehlert; Luis Gianneo; Alejandro Gutiérrez del Barrio; Sebastián Piana
- Production company: Emelco
- Distributed by: Interamericana
- Release date: June 17, 1949
- Running time: 95 minutes
- Country: Argentina
- Language: Spanish

Vidalita is a 1949 Argentine historical romantic comedy film directed by Luis Saslavsky—who also wrote the story—with a screenplay by Ariel Cortazzo and dialogue by both, produced by the Emelco studio during the classical period of Argentine cinema. Set in 1830, it tells the story of a young woman who cross-dresses as a gaucho to be accepted by her grandfather, who longs for a grandson, and who in her male guise ends up making the captain of a fort fall in love with her. It stars Mirtha Legrand, Narciso Ibáñez Menta, and Fernando Lamas, for whom it was his last film in the country.

Conceived as a folkloric operetta in a mocking tone, the film was Saslavsky's only work for Emelco and the first in which he took on the criollista subject matter that the industry demanded of him, though he did so in order to parody it. With music of folkloric roots and a marked influence from the director Josef von Sternberg, Vidalita subverts the tropes of gaucho culture and hegemonic masculinity, and has been read as an inverted version of the gauchesque novel Don Segundo Sombra.

Vidalita was a box-office bomb and received poor reviews from most critics, who accused it of disrespecting national symbols. Saslavsky attributed that rejection to persecution by Peronism that, according to his account, led to his blacklisting and his subsequent relocation to Europe, though it is not clear whether that persecution actually occurred. Over time, the film was rediscovered and valued by critics as a transgressive work; its has been read as a veiled representation of male homosexuality within the limits of industrial cinema, and it has been considered a forerunner of queer cinema. In a 2022 survey of the 100 greatest films of Argentine cinema, the film ranked 51st.

== Plot ==
From left to right: Amalia Sánchez Ariño, Narciso Ibáñez Menta, and Mirtha Legrand in a scene from Vidalita.

In 1830, the young orphan Vidalita del Rosario arrives from Chuquisaca in Buenos Aires, in the midst of the Carnival celebrations, accompanied by two nuns from the convent where she was raised. She travels to meet her grandfather, Don Hilarión de Arzábal, a wealthy rancher from Buenos Aires Province who has summoned her by letter. Upon arriving, the maid Cruz warns her that Don Hilarión is convinced his grandchild is a boy: tired of living surrounded by women—his daughters and granddaughters—the old man longs at last for a man in the house. So as not to disappoint him, Vidalita decides to cross-dress and pass herself off as the grandson he expects. She thus receives Jerónimo de Torresillas, the grandfather's agent, who does not notice the deception.

Still in disguise, Vidalita mingles in the Carnival, where the captain Mariano Sucre mistakes her for a thief. When she takes refuge in her room and removes her disguise, the officer discovers her as a woman and is captivated by her eyes, without learning who she is. The next day, the young woman arrives at the ranch in her male role, welcomed with jubilation by Don Hilarión. With the help of Cruz, who accompanies her to protect her, she must learn the trades and manners of the gaucho—riding, breaking horses, behaving like a man of the countryside—and fend off the advances of her aunts and cousins, who court her believing her to be a man; her clumsiness gives rise to numerous comic entanglements.

Don Hilarión holds an old enmity with the neighboring fort and decides to provoke the Indigenous people himself, dragging Vidalita along on the expedition. The reprisal comes in the form of a malón. Amid the danger, captain Sucre reappears at the head of the troops; upon reuniting with the supposed grandson, he begins to recognize in his eyes those of the woman from the Carnival. During his stay at the house, in scenes charged with misunderstanding, the captain shares the room with Vidalita and confides to him his fascination with that stranger.

The foreman Laureano Sánchez betrays Don Hilarión and takes the ranch hands away to seize the estate, leaving the grandfather and the young woman at the mercy of another malón. To ask for help from the fort—whose gate does not open for any man—Vidalita dresses as a woman and presents herself as "Rosario", the supposed sister of the grandson, whom she gives up for dead. The captain comes to her aid. However, Don Hilarión is sentenced to be executed by firing squad for having provoked the Indigenous people, and Sucre offers to save him in exchange for marrying his granddaughter. To protect her grandfather, Vidalita agrees to keep up the deception and to let herself be courted.

During the wedding celebration, the entanglement breaks open when Laureano denounces her as a man in disguise. Vidalita then confesses that she has cross-dressed and ends up revealing the whole truth: she is the orphaned granddaughter who passed herself off as a man in order to win Don Hilarión's affection. Faced with the question of how to know whether she is a man or a woman, the story is resolved with the certainty that the captain will clear up that doubt on the wedding night.

== Cast ==
- Mirtha Legrand as Vidalita del Rosario de Arzábal
- Narciso Ibáñez Menta as Don Hilarión de Arzábal
- Fernando Lamas as Captain Mariano Sucre
- Amalia Sánchez Ariño as Cruz
- Oscar Valicelli as Laureano Sánchez
- Milagros de la Vega as Aunt Dolores
- Leticia Scuri as a countrywoman
- Pilar Gómez as Aunt Trinidad
- Lucía Barausse as a nun
- Analía Gadé as María de los Milagros
- Enrique García Satur as Sergeant Serapio Páez
- Selva Sullivan as María de la Asunción
- Ángel Laborde
- Linda Lorena as a maid
- Jorge Villoldo
- Rosa Catá
- Marcelo Lavalle
- Pura Díaz
- Carlos Bellucci

== Production and style ==
View of the Emelco studios in 1950.

The production company Emelco, specialized in advertising and newsreel cinema and headed by the businessman Kurt Löwe, entered feature-film production in 1946—within the framework of the classical-industrial period of Argentine cinema—after acquiring the studios of the bankrupt Pampa Film. Emelco expanded Pampa Film's filming stages and incorporated modern equipment that made it one of the most sophisticated studios of the era; its first production was the comedy El retrato (1947), directed by Carlos Schlieper and starring Mirtha Legrand and Juan Carlos Thorry. However, in 1948 the company's collapse was precipitated when a government decree—then presided over by Juan Perón in his first term—banned advertising in cinemas, its main source of income. Emelco filmed with very high budgets to amortize the studio's re-equipment investments and, upon losing its advertising income, was forced to produce at ruinous costs. This led to the dismissal of hundreds of workers and Löwe's resignation from the presidency, leaving the company under bank control and with a reduced production schedule. Vidalita was one of the last films produced by Löwe before resigning from the company's presidency. In January 1949, the American magazine Variety reported that Emelco was finishing Vidalita and that the studio had recently become the property of the Central Bank, with Löwe, the company's former director, as general manager.

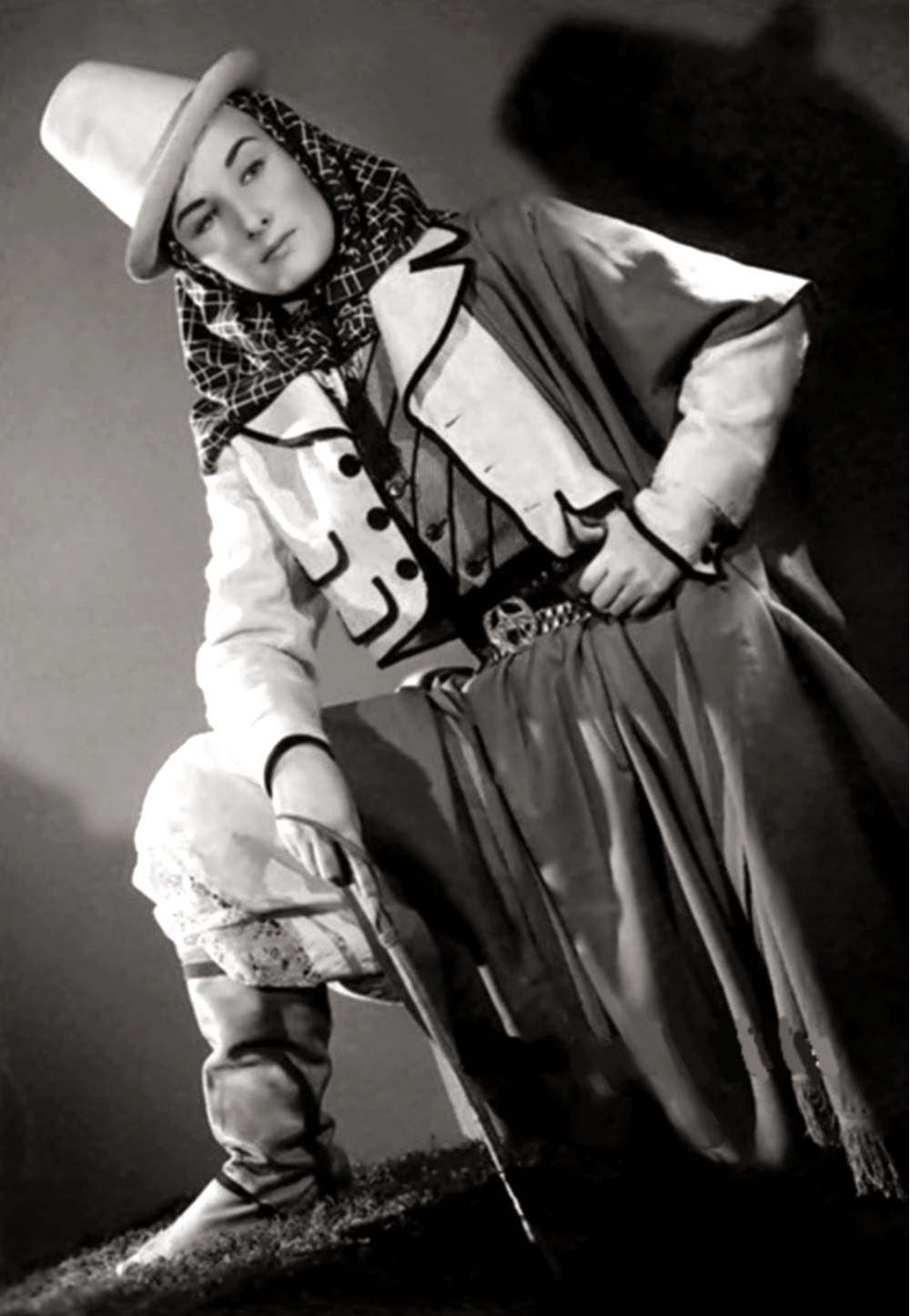
Legrand cross-dressed as a gaucho in a scene from Vidalita.

Luis Saslavsky occupied a complex place within Argentine cinema. He had trained in Paris and started out as a film critic and correspondent in Hollywood, and began his career as a director in the 1930s, at the height of the emergence of sound film and the accelerated industrial growth of the Golden Age, which gave rise to new debates about national cinema in which he also took part. Often criticized for his sophistication and for his attempt to emulate Hollywood in a foreignizing manner, Saslavsky shared in part the rejection by publications such as Cinegraf and intellectuals such as Jorge Luis Borges of the then-prevailing tango and arrabal cinema; however, he did not adhere to the criollista and nationalist alternative that those sectors proposed either—a cinema centered on the landscape of the interior and literary tradition—and, from a cosmopolitan position, kept his distance from both prescriptions. Vidalita was his only work for Emelco and the first film in which he gave in to incorporating the criollista subject matter that the industry had demanded of him, though he did so from a mocking perspective that ended up ridiculing it. The production had story and dialogue by Saslavsky, screenplay and dialogue by Ariel Cortazzo, cinematography by Pablo Tabernero, and set design by Álvaro Durañona y Vedia. Legrand starred in it—her second and last film for Emelco—alongside a large cast that included Narciso Ibáñez Menta, Fernando Lamas, in his last film in Argentina, Amalia Sánchez Ariño, and Oscar Valicelli.

Vidalita was conceived as a folkloric operetta in a mocking tone, with characters who speak in verse. According to Domingo Di Núbila, Saslavsky's idea was to "transplant the Spanish zarzuela to the pampa" and employ folkloric elements, as a reaction against the "false gauchismo" of other films set in rural settings. The film includes musical numbers, a pericón, a Buenos Aires carnival, and a horse-breaking, with music by Juan Ehlert, Luis Gianneo, Alejandro Gutiérrez del Barrio, and Sebastián Piana, and choreography by Antonio Barceló. Raúl Manrupe noted that, against a local tradition in which the musical was usually "linked to the tango" or to the imitation of the American model, Saslavsky proposed with Vidalita an "Argentine musical" of criollo roots. Di Núbila considered it the forerunner of a genre "full of possibilities" and "a forerunner worthy of study" of the musical comedy. Vidalita subverts the popular national imaginary built around the figure of the gaucho—rebellious, brave, and a symbol of manliness—and has been analyzed as an inverted version of the gauchesque novel Don Segundo Sombra (1926) by Ricardo Güiraldes. Whereas the novel is a coming-of-age tale in which a young man acquires from an old herdsman the knowledge and values that make him "a man" and discovers at the end that he is the heir to the ranch, in Vidalita the protagonist starts out as the presumed heir and, instead of a boy of uncertain origin, is a young woman unknown to her grandfather, who learns the gauchesque trades and values from him and from a foreman, only to end up mocking the supposed male superiority.

Vidalita is one of the films by Saslavsky in which the influence of the director Josef von Sternberg—whom he had interviewed in Hollywood and admired for his baroque style—appears most strongly. That influence is evident in the film's scenes of carnivals, dances, and masks, which serve Saslavsky to "hide plots and characters." From a narrative standpoint, Vidalita alters the usual chronological order of the classical model: it opens with a male voice-over that anticipates the story—"here begins the story of a very singular case, of the gaucho who was a girl betrothed to a soldier"—and with a flashback, while the protagonist introduces doubts about her identity ("how to explain why I wear women's clothing?"). According to Ana Laura Lusnich, although this paradoxical beginning subverts the narrative stability of the model, the resolution ends up "clarifying and suturing" the ambiguity through the closing of the story by the narrator.

== Release and initial reception ==
Cover of Radiofilm magazine on 7 July 1949, with an image of Legrand and Oscar Valicelli in Vidalita.

Vidalita premiered on 17 June 1949 at the Broadway cinema in Buenos Aires. Prior to its release, the film was shown to film reporters and authorities at a private screening on 27 May. The review in the newspaper Noticias Gráficas noted that the only original thing about the film "is the costumes, the sets, the music, the pampa, the Indians, all seen in such a peculiar way that it strips the subject of interest, emotion, and plausibility," and concluded that "the director seems to have wanted to amuse himself, entirely unconcerned with the audience following the film's action." The newspaper La Nación praised the film for alternating "the costumbrista with the picturesque" and the "romantic and slightly sentimental" tone with the "spirited depictions of the Indian raids," and highlighted its treatment of folklore "through grace, through lively and intentional cheerfulness." For its part, the review in the newspaper Crítica observed that, behind an "apparently superficial and frivolous" approach, Vidalita contains "a subtle irony" and a "mischievous spirit" that makes light of the gauchesque tradition, with "touches of satire" in the scenes of fighting against the Indigenous people and "delicious nonchalance" in the treatment of some intimate situations. It praised Saslavsky's care in the ensemble scenes, though it considered him "less sure in the handling of the intrigue," and highlighted the performances of Legrand, Lamas, and Ibáñez Menta and the "excellent" cinematography of Pablo Tabernero. The magazine Radiofilm accused Saslavsky of plagiarizing the Italian work L'ultimo lord by Ugo Falena.

Vidalita was a box-office bomb. Before its premiere, Variety estimated its cost at some 250,000 dollars, a figure it considered very high for what it could earn, despite Interamericana taking over the distribution amid changes in Emelco's management. After the premiere, the magazine reported that the production—costing one million pesos—remained on screens for only two weeks at the Broadway cinema, where it earned barely 15,600 dollars. Vidalita was harshly attacked by the pro-government press and did not attract the local audience, "since it felt that it betrayed a certain national stereotype." Saslavsky attributed the failure to the Peronists and recalled years later: "I think Vidalita emerges at a very particular moment, and Peronism, for reasons I ignore, is against it. They find that a gaucho portrayed by a woman in disguise is a lack of machismo, of criollismo." In his memoirs, the director claimed that Vidalita led to his blacklisting by Raúl Apold, head of the Undersecretariat of Press and Diffusion, and attributed that persecution to his enlistment in the American Good Neighbor policy service; although Daniel Tinayre, a friend of both, arranged a review of the measure, Saslavsky nonetheless decided to settle in Europe, where he continued his career. However, the details of the alleged persecution are unclear, as is whether it actually occurred, since this version comes solely from his own account.

According to Raúl Manrupe, it is "evident that the problem with the film was Saslavsky and the matter of sexual ambiguity, although this was never acknowledged at the time and recourse was had to the argument of a supposed wounded national character." He also noted that the critics' rejection of the film can be explained in part by an article Saslavsky had published in La Nación in 1941, in which he ironized about the state of the national film industry and asserted that many critics "wanted to secure a position, sell a screenplay, benefit monetarily in some way," which earned him the enmity of an important sector of the specialized press.

== Legacy and reappraisal ==
The scene in which Legrand—who passes herself off as a man—interacts with Lamas while he bathes has been noted for its strong homoerotic content.

Despite its initial failure, Vidalita was later rediscovered by critics, who have valued it as a transgressive work, have highlighted its parody of criollista subject matter and its treatment of cross-dressing—read as a representation of male homosexuality within the limits allowed by the classical-industrial model— and have considered it a forerunner of queer cinema. In Un diccionario de films argentinos, Raúl Manrupe and María Alejandra Portela defined it as "a mythical work and quite a cursed classic." As early as 1995, Manrupe had described Vidalita as "one of the most singular and brilliant films in the history of Argentine cinema, one of those that, without the fame of a classic, would deserve wider distribution and a redressing tribute," and "a fundamental personal work, worthy of a thorough study of its baroque, at times bizarre, and almost always merciless vision of the decadence of old Buenos Aires, chastity, and fin-de-siècle prudishness."

Although it was not the first Argentine film to resort to female cross-dressing—preceded by other comedies of the Golden Age such as La estancia del gaucho Cruz (1938) and Luisito (1943), in which a protagonist dresses as a man to gain access to spaces forbidden to women— critics have noted that Vidalita took that transgression further. For Adrián Melo, "there is probably nothing in Argentine cinema—neither before nor after—so deliciously erotic and transgressive in relation to sexual dissidence, nor so subversive in taking on two founding tropes of local nationality and hegemonic masculinity: being a gaucho and being a soldier." According to Emilio Bernini, the film configures a veiled representation of love and desire between men: in the restrictive context of industrial cinema, Saslavsky "finds the possibility of expanding, almost without limitations, a rhetoric of the implied, of the double allusion, of the equivocal." Bernini holds that the film is at once "an elaborate ironic discourse on the situation of the Argentine filmmaker" under censorship and a reflection on "the way in which a homosexual, in the first Peronist decade, must live, sustaining, despite his desire and the object of his affections, the appearance imposed by culture." In Vidalita, the captain played by Lamas falls in love with Legrand's character and is willing to marry him without knowing whether he is a man or a woman. The film also includes scenes of strong homoerotic charge, such as the one in which Legrand's character shares the room while the captain bathes, or the one of the cigarette they smoke together in bed. Melo also highlighted the scene in which Legrand, cross-dressed, dances alongside Lamas before a town scandalized at "seeing two men together, impassioned," and concluded that, for Vidalita alone, the actress "would deserve to enter the eternal heaven with the stars of the LGBTIQ world."

In a 2022 survey of the 100 greatest films of Argentine cinema organized by the film magazines La vida útil, Taipei, and La tierra quema and presented at the Mar del Plata International Film Festival, the film ranked 51st.

== See also ==
- Argentine LGBTQ cinema
- Cross-dressing in film and television
- List of Argentine films of 1949

== Bibliography ==
- Berardi, Mario (2006). La vida imaginada: vida cotidiana y cine argentino (in Spanish). Buenos Aires: Ediciones del Jilguero. ISBN 987-9416-09-0 – via Internet Archive.
- Bernini, Emilio (2008). "Dos versiones del amor por los hombres. Sobre Vidalita y Las ratas de Luis Saslavsky" (PDF). In Melo, Adrián (ed.). Otras historias de amor. Gays, lesbianas y travestis en el cine argentino (in Spanish). Buenos Aires: Editorial LEA. pp. 67–75.
- Di Núbila, Domingo (1960). Historia del cine argentino. Tomo II (in Spanish). Buenos Aires: Cruz de Malta.
- España, Claudio (2005). "El cine argentino, 1945-1965: del clasicismo a la modernidad". Historia general del arte en la Argentina. Tomo X (PDF) (in Spanish). Buenos Aires: Academia Nacional de Bellas Artes. pp. 17–94. ISBN 950-612-005-6.
- Fabbro, Gabriela (1997). "Luis Saslavsky". In Kriger, Clara; Portela, Alejandra (eds.). Diccionario de realizadores (in Spanish). Buenos Aires: Ediciones del Jilguero. pp. 142–143. ISBN 987-95786-3-5 – via Internet Archive.
- Lusnich, Ana Laura (2007). El drama social folclórico. El universo rural en el cine argentino (in Spanish). Prologue by Claudio España. Buenos Aires: Editorial Biblos. ISBN 978-950-786-613-5 – via Internet Archive.
- Manrupe, Raúl; Portela, María Alejandra (2001). Un diccionario de films argentinos (1930-1995) (in Spanish). Buenos Aires: Corregidor. ISBN 950-05-0896-6 – via Internet Archive.
- Peña, Fernando Martín (2012). Cien años de cine argentino (eBook) (in Spanish). Buenos Aires: Editorial Biblos. ISBN 978-987-691-098-9.
