= Esposa último modelo =

1950 film

- Directed by: Carlos Schlieper
- Written by: Tito Insausti and Arnaldo Malfatti (play)
- Screenplay by: Ariel Cortazzo, Carlos Schlieper
- Starring: Mirtha Legrand; Ángel Magaña; Osvaldo Miranda
- Cinematography: Francis Boeniger
- Edited by: Atilio Rinaldi, Raúl Rinaldi
- Music by: Víctor Slister
- Release date: 27 July 1950
- Running time: 86 minutes
- Country: Argentina
- Language: Spanish

Esposa último modelo is a 1950 Argentine film directed by Carlos Schlieper during the classical era of Argentine cinema.

== Cast ==
- Mirtha Legrand as María Fernanda Alcántara
- Ángel Magaña as Alfredo Villegas
- Osvaldo Miranda as Lucas Alegre
- Amalia Sánchez Ariño as Mercedes 'Yaya'
- Felisa Mary as Abuela Carlota
