= Mario Perelli =

Argentine actor

Mario Perelli was an Argentine actor. He starred in the 1950 film Arroz con leche under director Carlos Schlieper.
