= Alejandra (1956 film) =

1956 film

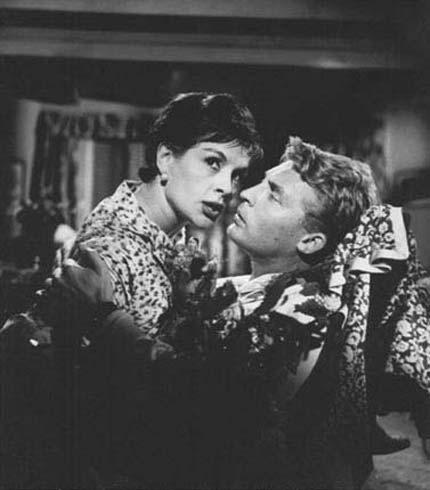
- Directed by: Carlos Schlieper
- Written by: Alexandre Bisson; Georges Feydeau
- Produced by: Carlos Schlieper
- Starring: Delia Garcés; Georges Rivière
- Cinematography: Antonio Merayo
- Edited by: Jorge Gárate
- Music by: Juan Ehlert
- Distributed by: Argentina Sono Film
- Release date: April 19, 1956
- Running time: 86 minutes
- Country: Argentina
- Language: Spanish

== Basic ==
Alejandra (English: Alexandra) is a 1956 Argentine film directed by Carlos Schlieper. It is based on a play by Georges Feydeauy and Alexandre Bisson. The film stars Delia Garcés and Georges Rivière and was released on April 19, 1956.

== About ==
The film narrates the tale of the capricious millionairess who feigns poverty and a life sacrificed to conquer the man she loves.

== Cast ==
- Delia Garcés
- Georges Rivière (as Jorge Rivier)
- Nélida Romero
- Manuel Perales
- Carlos Estrada
- Emilio Gaete
- Lalo Hartich
- Aurelia Ferrer
- Pablo Acciardi
- Anita Larronde
- María Elena Ruas
- Mabel Duclos
- Humberto de la Rosa
- Américo Machado
- Aníbal Pastor
- María Elina Ruas (as María Elena Ruas)
