= Serrador =

Serrador is a surname. Notable people with the surname include:

- Esteban Serrador (1903–1978), Chilean actor
- Narciso Ibáñez Serrador (1935–2019), Spanish director, actor and screenwriter
- Pastor Serrador (1919–2006), Cuban-born Argentine actor
- Pepita Serrador (1913–1964), Argentine actress
