= Delia Garcés =

Argentine actress (1919–2001)

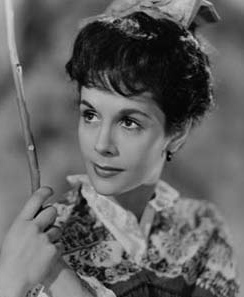
- Born: Delia Amadora García Gerboles; 13 October 1919; Buenos Aires, Argentina
- Died: 7 November 2001 (aged 82); Buenos Aires, Argentina
- Occupation: Actress
- Years active: 1936-1966

Delia Amadora García Gerboles better known as Delia Garcés (Spanish pronunciation: [ˈdelja ɣaɾˈses]; 13 October 1919 – 7 November 2001) was an Argentine film actress of the Golden Age of Argentine cinema, making almost 30 appearances in film between 1937 and 1959. She also acted on stage from 1936 to 1966. She won the Premios Sur Best Actress award three times from the Argentine Academy of Cinematography Arts and Sciences, as well as the Argentine Film Critics Association's Silver Condor Award for Best Actress, the Premios Leopold Torre Nilsson, Premio Pablo Podestá, and the inaugural ACE Platinum Lifetime Achievement Award from the Asociación de Cronistas del Espectáculo.

== Biography ==
Delia Amadora García Gerboles was born 13 October 1919 to Gabriel García and Amadora Gerboles in Buenos Aires, Argentina. She was a student of the Labardén Children's Theatre and trained at the Conservatorio Nacional de Música y Arte Escénico (National Conservatory of Music and Performing Arts) and the Comedia Nacional at the Teatro Nacional Cervantes. Claiming she had always been a "theater rat", and performed her first role at age 8, she trained with students like Zully Moreno, Nury Montsé, Fanny Navarro, and Malisa Zini. Students received a small monthly stipend and participated in plays to hone their skills many taking pseudonyms. Between the performances of Mandinga en la sierra and Cyrano de Bergerac, María Luisa Zambrini became Malisa Sambrini and Delia Gerbolés became Delia Garcés. One of her teachers, Cunil Cabanillas, gave her her first professional role in a small part of the 1936 production of Locos de verano, a play written by Gregorio de Laferrère.

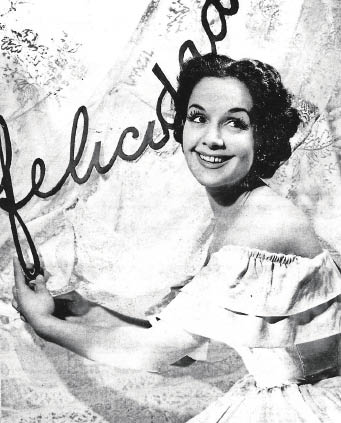
Delia Garcés

Her debut in film occurred in the 1937 in ¡Segundos afuera! directed by Chas de Cruz and Alberto Echebehere. Later that same year, she was in the film Viento Norte directed by Mario Soffici, which caught the interest of critics as it was widely seen as the best film of the year. She followed those with Maestro Levita (1938), Kilómetro 111 (1938), Doce mujeres (1939), and La vida de Carlos Gardel (1939), with Hugo del Carril and Elsa O'Connor under the direction of Alberto de Zavalía, who she would soon marry. Almost from the beginning, her acting persona was of a naïve heroine, an elfin beauty, who appeared fragile, but had a touch of impishness that portrayed strength and daring.

De Zavalía made eleven films with Garcés showcasing her in Dama de compañía (1941); Veinte años y una noche (1941), her first of several films with Spanish actor Pedro López Lagar; Malambo (1942); and others. In 1941 she won a Premios Sur for Best Actress from the Argentine Academy of Cinematography Arts and Sciences for Veinte años y una noche and repeated the award in 1942 for Malambo, which was presented by Orson Welles.

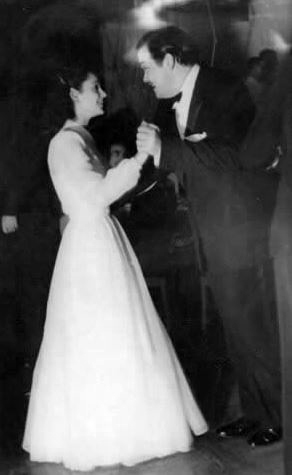
Delia Garcés and Orson Welles at an Argentine Film Critics Association awards reception for Citizen Kane (April 1942)

Garcés starred in "La maestrita de los obreros" in 1942 directed by her husband with Oscar Valicelli, Felisa Mary, Orestes Caviglia, among others. In 1943, she made Casa de muñecas and was highly praised for her portrayal of "Nora" in the film which was directed by Ernesto Arancibia. Filming began in 1944 for La Dama Duende in which Garcés starred, directed by Luis Saslavsky, in an elaborate film based on a seventeenth-century Spanish play by Pedro Calderón de La Barca. With the exception of Saslavsky and Garcés, all the other facets of the play were done by the Spanish émigré community. Garcés won her third Premios Sur Best Actress award from the Argentine Academy of Cinematography Arts and Sciences in 1945.

That same year, Garcés formed her own theatrical company and in March premiered the first play of Homero Manzi and Ulises Petit de Murat, La novia de arena, at the Odeón Theater. In her troupe, besides herself were: Alba Castellanos, Orestes Caviglia, Margarita Corona, Enrique Alvarez Diosdado, Alita Román, Domingo Sapelli, and Milagros de la Vega. Having completed a run of the play, her company continued at the Odeón and performed her "farewell" theatrical production in Argentina, Claudia by Rose Franken. After the performance, due to the political situation with Juan Peron's government, she and her husband planned to leave Argentina. But, they stayed and in 1946, she performed La eterna ninfa at the Odeón and filmed Rosa de América directed by her husband with Orestes Caviglia, Antonia Herrero, Elsa O'Connor, among others. She earned praise for her roles in El gran amor de Bécquer (1946) and El hombre que amé (1947) and in 1948, she performed in the play El otro yo de Marcela which was so successful that it led to a film by the same name two years later, in which she sang and danced.

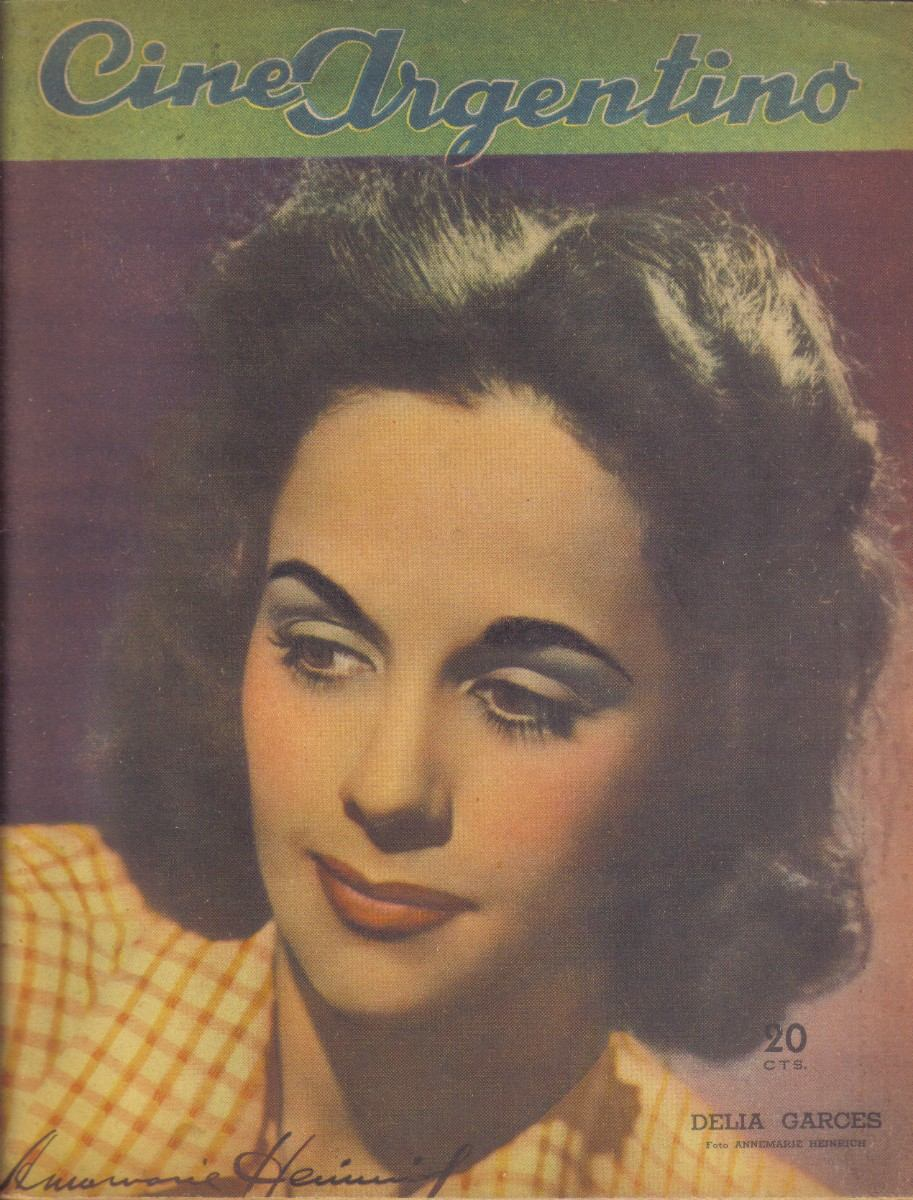
Delia Garcés by Annemarie Heinrich, 1942

In 1951, Garcés and de Zavalía went to Mexico and she made one of her most memorable films there in 1951-1952. In Él directed by Luis Buñuel, she played Gloria, the wife of the jealous and paranoid Francisco, played by Arthur Cordova. The film, though released in Mexico in 1953 and presented at the 1953 Cannes Film Festival, was not released in Argentina until 1958. Almost immediately, in March, 1953, she began work on Lágrimas robadas in Mexico with Andrea Palma under the direction of Julián Soler.

Garcés then did a tour of Latin America which included Chile, Peru, Colombia, Venezuela and Puerto Rico covering the plays Casa de muñecas, Leocadia, Nina, Tesá, La voz de la tórtola, El balcón de Julieta all with her husband, and La llave en el desván by Alejandro Casona, before arriving in Spain. She began filming Rebeldía under the direction of José Antonio Nieves Conde which was based on the play La luz de la víspera by José María Pemán.

In 1955, they were able to return to Argentina and Garcés starred in Mi marido y mi novio, directed by Carlos Schlieper. The film was forward-thinking for the times, with Garcés poking fun at gender stereotypes and singing of women being as free as men. She made her last film, Alejandra in 1956 for which she won the Argentine Film Critics Association's Silver Condor Award for Best Actress.

In 1958, she and de Zavalía had a season at the National Theater of Paris, performing as the Buenos Aires Theater Company in the production of La Carroza de San Sacramento by Prosper Mérimée and El Límite by de Zavalía. That same year, she starred in a television series on Channel 9, Lo mejor de nuestra vida, nuestros hijos, directed by Alberto Migré based on stories by Julio César Barton. She and her husband also performed at the Teatro Nacional Cervantes in both 1958 and 1959, completing No es cordero... que es cordera and then doing several guest appearances the following year. In 1961, Garcés starred in La doncella prodigiosa, a play by her husband, de Zavalía at the Teatro Nacional Cervantes under the direction of Fernando Labat.

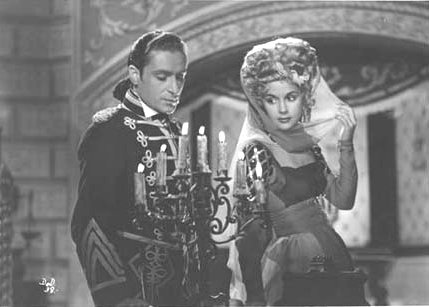
Enrique Alvarez Diosdado – Delia Garcés – La dama duende (1944)

From 1960 on, Garcés dedicated herself launching the Teatro San Martín. She had memorable performances in Ondine by Jean Giraudoux; Saint Joan by George Bernard Shaw; The Living Room by Graham Greene; The Turn of the Screw by Henry James; and the 1966 production of El jardín de los cerezos (The Cherry Orchard) by Anton Chekhov which was her last performance before she retired to care for her husband through his last long final illness. She may also have been prevented from performing, as her name appeared on the list of banned artists during the 1979 dictatorship. She appeared briefly in a tribute that Mirtha Legrand did for Channel 9 on the death of Daniel Tinayre.

She joined the board of the National Endowment for the Arts and worked with them throughout her retirement. In 1982, she received the Premios Leopoldo Torre Nilsson In 1995, she received the Premio Pablo Podestá and a room at the Tita Merello Complex on Suipacha Street was named in her honor by the Institute of Cinema and Audiovisual Arts to acknowledge her stature in Argentine film. On 29 October 2001 she won the first ACE Platinum Lifetime Achievement Award ever presented by the Asociación de Cronistas del Espectáculo (Association of reporters of Show Business)

Garcés died on 7 November 2001 in Buenos Aires, Argentina.

== Awards ==
- 1941 Premios Sur for Best Actress for Veinte años y una noche
- 1942 Premios Sur for Best Actress for Malambo
- 1945 Premios Sur for Best Actress for La dama duende
- 1957 Silver Condor for Best Actress for Alejandra
- 1959 Won the World Cinema Golden Figurine from Peru
- 1982 Premios Leopold Torre Nilsson
- 1995 Premio Pablo Podestá
- 1996 Dedication of Delia Garcés room at the Tita Merello Complex
- 2001 ACE Platinum Lifetime Achievement Award

== Filmography ==
- ¡Segundos afuera! (1937)
- Viento Norte (1937)
- Melgarejo (1937)
- Maestro Levita (1938)
- Villa Discordia (1938)
- Kilómetro 111 (1938)
- Doce mujeres (1939)
- Alas de mi patria (1939)
- La vida de Carlos Gardel (1939)
- Gente bien (1939)
- Muchachas que estudian (1939)
- Dama de compañía (1940)
- Veinte años y una noche (1941)
- La maestrita de los obreros (1942)
- Concierto de almas (1942)
- Malambo (1942)
- Casa de muñecas (1943)
- La dama duende (1944)
- Rosa de América (1946)
- El gran amor de Bécquer (1946)
- El hombre que amé (1947)
- De padre desconocido (1949)
- El otro yo de Marcela (1950)
- Él (1952) (in Mexico)
- Lágrimas robadas (1953) (in Mexico)
- Rebellion (1954) (in Spain)
- Mi marido y mi novio (1955)
- Alejandra (1956)
