= Mi marido y mi novio =

- Directed by: Carlos Schlieper
- Written by: Georges Feydeau, Victorien Sardou, Carlos Schlieper, Emilio Villalba Welsh
- Cinematography: Antonio Merayo
- Edited by: Jorge Gárate
- Music by: Tito Ribero
- Release date: 24 May 1955
- Running time: 80 minutes
- Country: Argentina
- Language: Spanish

Mi marido y mi novio is a 1955 Argentine film directed by Carlos Schlieper, starring Delia Garcés and Georges Rivière.

== Cast ==
- Delia Garcés
- Georges Rivière
- Luis Dávila
- Héctor Calcaño
- Nélida Romero
- Paulette Christian
- Irma Roy
- Carmen Campoy
- Víctor Martucci
- Perla Achával
- Alicia Bellán
