= Luis Dávila (actor) =

Argentine actor (1927–1998)

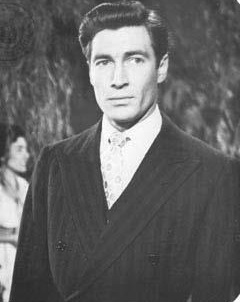
- Born: Héctor Carmelo González Ferrantino; July 15, 1927; Buenos Aires, Argentina
- Died: August 21, 1998 (aged 71); Buenos Aires, Argentina
- Occupation: Actor
- Years active: 1952–1990

Héctor Carmelo González Ferrantino (July 15, 1927 – August 21, 1998), known by the stage name Luis Dávila, was an Argentine actor. He appeared in over 90 film and television productions between 1952 and 1990.

== Life and career ==
Born in Buenos Aires, Dávila made his film debut in 1952. At the height of the Golden Age of Argentine cinema, he played a romantic lead opposite the likes of Silvia Legrand, Mirtha Legrand, Irma Roy, Lolita Torres, Silvia Montanari, and Lilián del Río.

In the 1960s, Dávila moved to Spain. He appeared in many international co-productions and participated in many of the European genre film trends of the decade, including science-fiction (Mission Stardust), swashbucklers (Ivanhoe, the Norman Swordsman, Long Live Robin Hood), Eurospy (Espionage in Tangier), Spaghetti Westerns (Death on High Mountain), and giallo (A Quiet Place to Kill).

In the 1980s, he returned to Argentina, appearing in many telenovelas. His career slowed in the following decade following a hip injury he sustained.

== Death ==
Dávila died of a heart attack on August 28, 1998, in Buenos Aires. He was buried at La Chacarita Cemetery.

== Selected filmography ==
- Vigilantes y ladrones (1952)
- El baldío (1952)
- Maria Madalena (1954)
- Sinfonía de juventud (1955)
- Lo que le pasó a Reynoso (1955)
- Canario rojo (1955)
- Requiebro (1955)
- Vida nocturna (1955)
- Mi marido y mi novio (1955)
- Novia para dos (1956)
- Operación Antartida (1957)
- La hermosa mentira (1958)
- Amor se dice cantando (1959)
- Campo arado (1959)
- Vacanze in Argentina (1960)
- Héroes de hoy (1960)
- Carnival of Crime (1962) - Ray Donato
- Bahía de Palma (1962)
- Los que verán a Dios (1963)
- The Twin Girls (1963) - Doctor
- The Blackmailers (1963) - Don Andrés, el sacerdote
- El sol en el espejo (1963) - Carlos
- La gran coartada (1963) - Jorge
- El escándalo (1964)
- Como dos gotas de agua (1964) - Ricardo Arriaga
- Donde tú estés (1964) - Rodolfo
- Una madeja de lana azul celeste (1964)
- Prohibido soñar (1964)
- Relevo para un pistolero (1964) - Edwin Jackson
- Flor salvaje (1965) - Eduardo
- Faites vos jeux, mesdames (1965) - Boris Gourdine
- Espionage in Tangier (1965) - Marc Mato (Mike Murphy) Agent S 077
- Man from Canyon City (1965) - Red El Rayo
- Doc, Hands of Steel (1965) - Slade Carroll
- María Rosa (1965) - Salvador
- Tumba para un forajido (1965) - Frank
- La otra orilla (1965)
- Zampo y yo (1966) - Carlos
- Dynamite Jim (1966) - Dynamite Jim Farrell
- Ypotron - Final Countdown (1966) - Lemmy Logan
- The Viscount (1967) - Steve Heller
- Mission Stardust (1967) - Capt. Mike Bull
- L'uomo del colpo perfetto (1967) - Gustav
- Llaman de Jamaica, Mr. Ward (1968) - Mulligan
- Rebus (1968) - Il Baro
- Suicide Commandos (1968) - Sam
- Death on High Mountain (1969) - Francis Parker / Mark Harrison
- Las amigas (1969) - Pablo
- Simón Bolívar (1969) - Carlos Peñaranda
- Eagles Over London (1969) - Jacques
- Las nenas del mini-mini (1969) - Doctor
- Johnny Ratón (1969) - Hermano Pablo
- A Quiet Place to Kill (1970) - Albert Duchamps
- Verano 70 (1970) - Mario
- Matalo! (1970) - Phil
- The Tigers of Mompracem (1970) - Lord Brooke
- Long Live Robin Hood (1971) - Sir Robert
- Ivanhoe, the Norman Swordsman (1971) - Stephen Cunningham
- Si estás muerto, ¿por qué bailas? (1971) - Robert
- The House of the Doves (1972) - Enrique
- Coartada en disco rojo (1972) - Dr. Michele Azzini
- Las colocadas (1972) - Luis
- Los novios de mi mujer (1972) - Luis Otero
- Basuras humanas (1972) - Antonio
- Pancho Villa (1972) - McDermott
- Las tres perfectas casadas (1973) - Javier Guzmán
- La redada (1973) - Redactor jefe
- La venganza de la momia (1975) - Inspector Taylor
- Hormiga negra (1979)
- Cuatro pícaros bomberos (1979)
- Juventud sin barreras (1979)
