= El Campeón soy yo =

1960 film

- Directed by: Virgilio Muguerza
- Written by: Alberto Peyrou, Diego Santillán
- Produced by: Luis Giudici
- Starring: Pablo Palitos; Beatriz Taibo; Héctor Méndez; Paulette Christian
- Cinematography: Vicente Cosentino
- Edited by: José Cardella
- Music by: Víctor Buchino
- Release date: 1960
- Running time: 95 minutes
- Country: Argentina
- Language: Spanish

El Campeón soy yo is a 1960 Argentine film directed by Virgilio Muguerza. It stars Pablo Palitos, Beatriz Taibo, Héctor Méndez and Paulette Christian.

== Plot ==
An individual is forced to pose as a famous boxer.

== Cast ==
- Pablo Palitos
- Beatriz Taibo
- Héctor Méndez
- Paulette Christian
- Mario Díaz
- Kid Gavilán
- Cayetano Biondo
- Lalo Malcolm
- Susana Latou

== Reception ==
Jorge Miguel Couselo described the film in Correo de la Tarde as a "Lamentable accomplishment".
