= Beatriz Taibo =

Argentine actress (1932–2019)

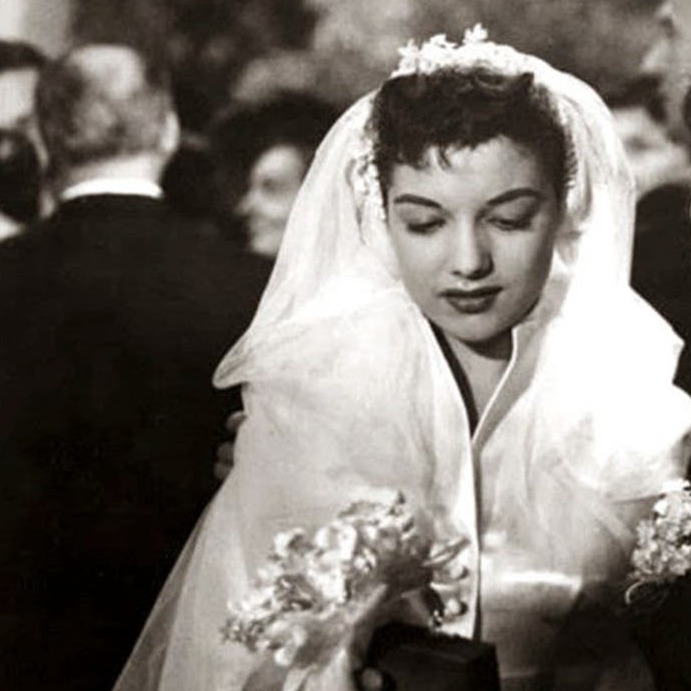
- Taibo in To Dress Saints (1955)
- Born: March 10, 1932; San Telmo
- Died: March 2, 2019 (aged 86)
- Occupation: actor

Beatriz Taibo (March 10, 1932 – March 2, 2019) was an Argentine film and TV actor.

== Life ==
Taibo was born in San Telmo in 1932.

In 1942 Taibo began to act at the age of ten on the radio programme La Pandilla Marilyn. She began to get work on the radio, as a host and broadcaster. From her time as an announcer she was left with the nickname "Moth", for because of the adverts she made for moth balls. Taibo would make her film debut in The Millions of Semillita in 1950 if the film had been released. Fittingly she was in a film based on a radio series which told the adventures of the Garcia family who moved.

In the 1960s she made some commercials for Lux soap. Taibo and Antonio Carrizo hosted a program on ratings leader Radio Belgrano, in which the duo became known for announcing advertisements in the form of a dialogue. Taibo, for example, might ask: "Traffic's at a standstill. What do you think happened?" to which Carrizo would answer "A Sunlight girl must have walked by!"

She appeared in the theatre, notably in the play Boeing-Boeing, which ran for four seasons and whose cast included Ernesto Bianco, Paulette Christian, Ambar La Fox, Osvaldo Miranda and her friend Nelly Beltrán.

In 1955 she appeared with Tita Merello in Para vestir santos (To Dress Saints), which was directed by Leopoldo Torre Nilsson. She and Yuki Nambá had supporting roles.

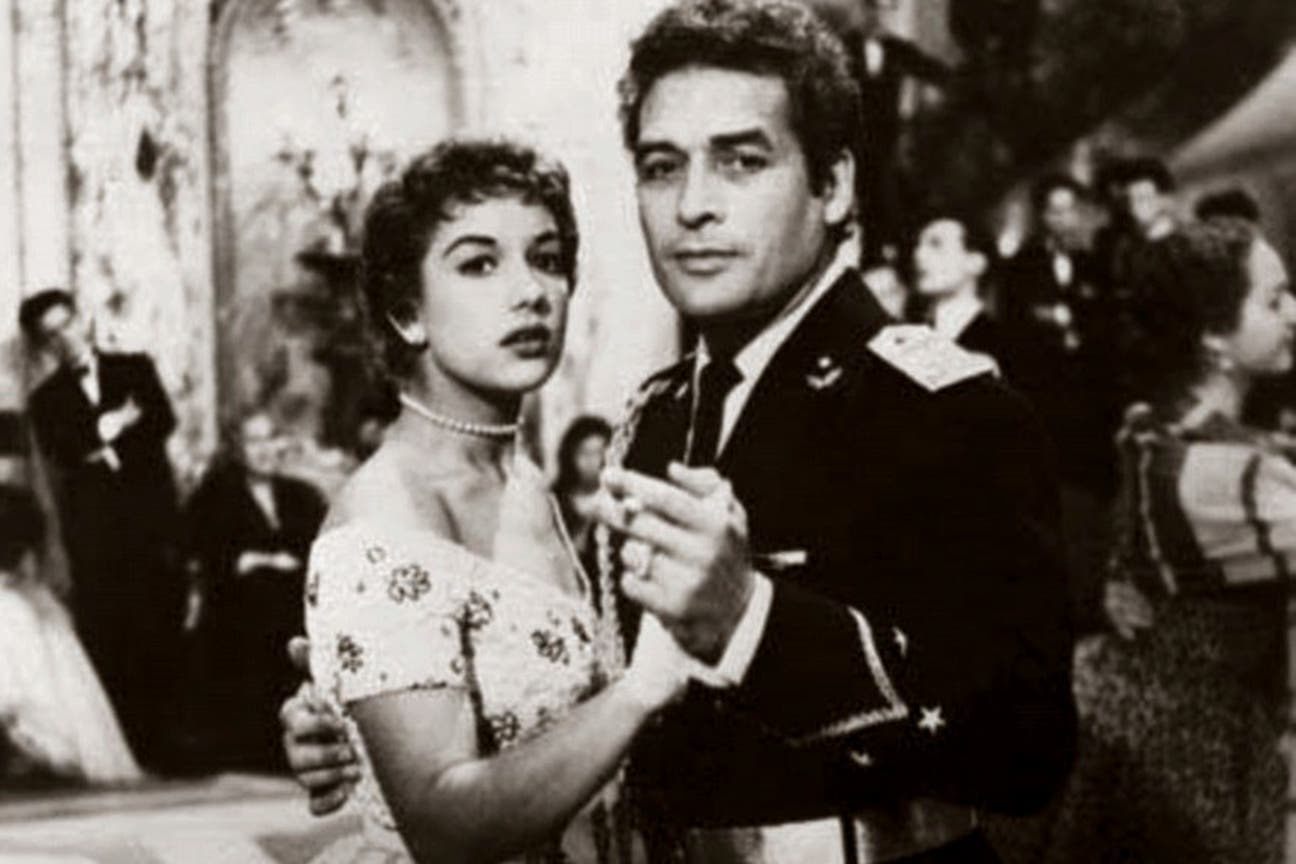
Beatrix Taibo and Jorge Mistral in Amor Prohibido in 1958, by Luis César Amadori and Ernesto Arancibia

In the 1960s she was extending her acting to television, where she appeared in leading soaps such as Inconquistable Viviana Holguera, Adorable Professor Aldao and Juana Rebelde. She notably starred in Jorge Bellizzi and Abel Santa Cruz's Call Me Sparrow, a TV comedy where Taibo played a woman who had to pretend to be a man at work.

== Films ==
- 1950: Los millones de Semillita (never released)
- 1950: Los Pérez García
- 1951: Martín Pescador
- 1951: Pocholo, Pichuca y yo
- 1953: Asunto terminado
- 1953: Las tres claves
- 1954: El cartero
- 1955: Sinfonía de juventud
- 1955: Para vestir santos
- 1955: Pobre pero honrado
- 1955: El campeón soy yo
- 1956: Música, alegría y amor
- 1957: Fantoche
- 1958: Amor prohibido
- 1959: Evangelina
- 1959: Gringalet
- 1963: Cuando calienta el sol
- 1964: Canuto Cañete y los 40 ladrones
- 1964: Cuidado con las colas
- 1964: Un soltero en apuros
- 1966: Escala musical
- 1966: La buena vida
- 1967: Cuando los hombres hablan de mujeres
- 1972: El profesor tirabombas
- 1982: Los fierecillos indomables
- 1984: Mingo y Aníbal, dos pelotazos en contra
- 1988: Atracción peculiar
