= Requiebro =

- Directed by: Carlos Schlieper
- Written by: Antonio Quintero, Manuel Tamayo
- Produced by: José Huberman
- Cinematography: Ricardo Younis
- Edited by: Gerardo Rinaldi, Antonio Ripoll
- Music by: Ramón Zarzoso
- Release date: 25 August 1955
- Running time: 83 minutes
- Country: Argentina
- Language: Spanish

Requiebro is a 1955 Argentine film directed by Carlos Schlieper, starring Carmen Sevilla and Ángel Magaña.

== Cast ==
- Carmen Sevilla
- Ángel Magaña
- Ricardo Castro Ríos
- Luis Dávila
- Manuel Perales
- Irma Roy
- Amalia Sánchez Ariño
