= Detective (1954 film) =

- Directed by: Carlos Schlieper
- Written by: Julio Porter, Abel Santacruz
- Starring: Pablo Palitos, Fada Santoro
- Cinematography: Américo Hoss
- Edited by: José Cardella
- Music by: Vlady
- Release date: 29 September 1954
- Running time: 85 minutes
- Country: Argentina
- Language: Spanish

Detective is a 1954 Argentine film directed by Carlos Schlieper during the classical era of Argentine cinema.

== Cast ==
- Pablo Palitos
- Fada Santoro
- Susana Campos
- Felisa Mary
- Héctor Méndez
- Egle Martin
- Tangolele
- Carlos Enríquez
- Irma Atoche
- Nina Marqui
- Guillermo Brizuela Méndez
- Osvaldo Nícora
- Julio Portela
- Emma Gardina
- Alba Varela
- Esther Kell
- Graciela Herrero
- Renée Roxana
