= Eliseo Herrero =

Spanish-born Argentine actor

Eliseo Herrero was a Spanish-born Argentine actor. He starred in the 1950 film Arroz con leche under director Carlos Schlieper.

== Selected filmography ==
- The Song of the Suburbs (1941)
- Arroz con leche (1950)
- The Earring (1951)
