= Adiós problemas =

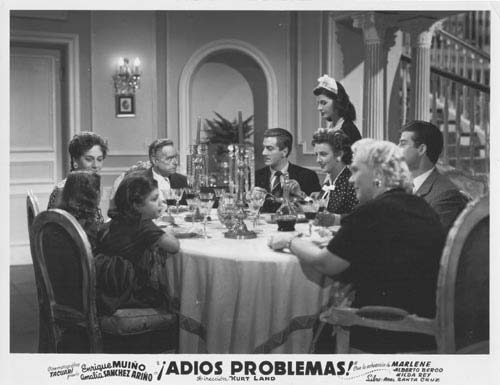
- Promotional photo
- Directed by: Kurt Land
- Written by: Abel Santacruz
- Produced by: Kurt Land
- Starring: Enrique Muiño; Amalia Sánchez Ariño
- Cinematography: Enrique Wallfisch
- Edited by: José Gallego
- Music by: José Rodríguez Faure
- Release date: 18 May 1955
- Running time: 79 minutes
- Countries: Argentina; Spain
- Language: Spanish

Adiós problemas (English language: Goodbye problems) is a 1955 Argentine romantic drama film directed by Kurt Land and written by Abel Santacruz. The film starred Enrique Muiño and Amalia Sánchez Ariño.

== Synopsis ==
Centering on themes of morality, passion, lust and jealousy this romantic drama is the story of a righteous man who disgraces his family and his reputation when he is seduced by a pretty young woman.

== Other cast ==
- Alberto Berco
- Miguel Dante
- Hilda Rey
- Osvaldo Terranova
- Miguel Angel Valera
- Marlene

== Release ==
The film premiered on 18 May 1955.
