= The Phantom of the Operetta =

The Phantom of the Operetta may refer to:

- The Phantom of the Operetta (1955 film), an Argentine film
- The Phantom of the Operetta (1960 film), a Mexican film
