= Emelco =

Former Argentine film studio

View of the Emelco studios in 1950.

Emelco was an Argentine film studio from the Golden Age of Argentine cinema. In 1946, Emelco reportedly had annual contracts with 530 theatres in Argentina, representing all of the first run and major second run and neighborhood theatres. It also had opened an office in New York City.

The studies became the property of the Industrial Bank of the Argentine Republic and in 1966, during the government of Dr. Arturo Umberto Illía, they were granted on loan to the Industrial Bank Club of the Argentine Republic, today called Banade Club, according to the change of name of the entity. banking. When the National Development Bank (BANADE) was liquidated during the government of Dr. Carlos Menem, the loan gave rise to an assignment by law of the Nation.

== Selected filmography ==
- Burnt Land (1968)
- Native Pony (1953)
- Derecho viejo (1951)
- Una viuda casi alegre (1950)
- Juan Mondiola (1950)
- Rice and Milk (1950)
- Dance of Fire (1949)
- Diez segundos (1949)
- Vidalita (1949)
- The Name Was Carlos Gardel (1949)
- El barco sale a las diez (1948)
- The Drummer of Tacuari (1948)
- White Horse Inn (1948)
- Tierra del Fuego (1948)
- El retrato (1947)
