= Póker de amantes para tres =

- Directed by: Ramiro Cortés, Francisco Tarantini
- Written by: Serra
- Produced by: Marcos Blusman
- Starring: Oscar Brizuela, Elvira Porcel, Irene Moreno
- Cinematography: Francisco Miranda
- Release date: 1969
- Running time: 80 minute
- Country: Argentina
- Language: Spanish

Póker de amantes para tres is a 1969 Argentine film.

== Cast ==
- Oscar Brizuela
- Elvira Porcel
- Irene Moreno
- Juan Alighieri
