= Fangio, the Demon of the Tracks =

- Directed by: Román Viñoly Barreto
- Produced by: Armando Bo
- Cinematography: Gumer Barreiros
- Edited by: Oscar Carchano
- Music by: Alberto Gnecco, José Rodríguez Faure
- Release date: 1950
- Country: Argentina
- Language: Spanish

Fangio, the Demon of the Tracks (Spanish: Fangio, el demonio de las pistas) is a 1950 Argentine motor racing film of the classical era of Argentine cinema, directed by Román Viñoly Barreto, starring Yvonne Bastien, Ernesto Bianco, Armando Bo and Néstor Deval.

The film is a biopic about the life of legendary Argentine motor racer Juan Manuel Fangio and also features himself in a few cameo roles.

== Cast ==
- Armando Bo
- Miguel Gómez Bao
- Eva Dongé
- Ivonne De Lys
- Domingo Sapelli
- Ernesto Bianco
- Maruja Roig
- Luis Elías Sojit
- Jacinto Herrera
- Néstor Deval
- Fernando Labat
- Vicente Thomas
- Ricardo Degrossi
- Juan Manuel Fangio as himself.
- Aníbal Romero
