= Puppet (film) =

- Directed by: Román Viñoly Barreto
- Release date: 1957
- Running time: 104 minute
- Country: Argentina
- Language: Spanish

Puppet (Spanish: Fantoche) is a 1957 Argentine film directed by Román Viñoly Barreto.

== Cast ==
- Luis Sandrini
- Beatriz Taibo
- Eduardo Sandrini
- Juan Bono
- Néstor Deval
- Víctor Martucci
- Fanny Brena
- María Esther Buschiazzo
- Max Citelli
- Irma Lagos
- Nino Nor
- Irma Gabriel
- Armando Lopardo
- Amarilis Carrié
- Warly Ceriani
- Arturo Bamio
- Mario Casado
- Miguel Cossa
- Camilo De Asis
- Luis de Lucía
- Enrique Kossi
- Guillermo Stábile ...Él mismo
