= Virginia de la Cruz =

Paraguayan actress

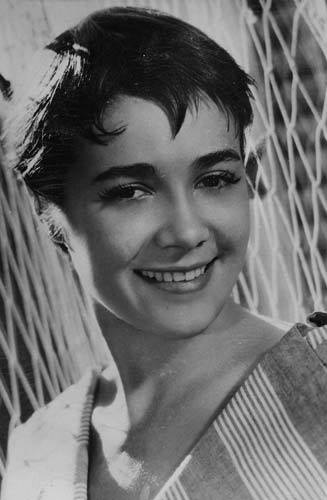
Virginia de la Cruz in 1951

Virginia de la Cruz was a Paraguayan actress whose career was most prolific in Argentina. She starred in the 1950 film Arroz con leche under director Carlos Schlieper. She was married to the actor and conductor Carlos Ginés.
