= Amelia Vargas =

Cuban actress and dancer (1928–2019)

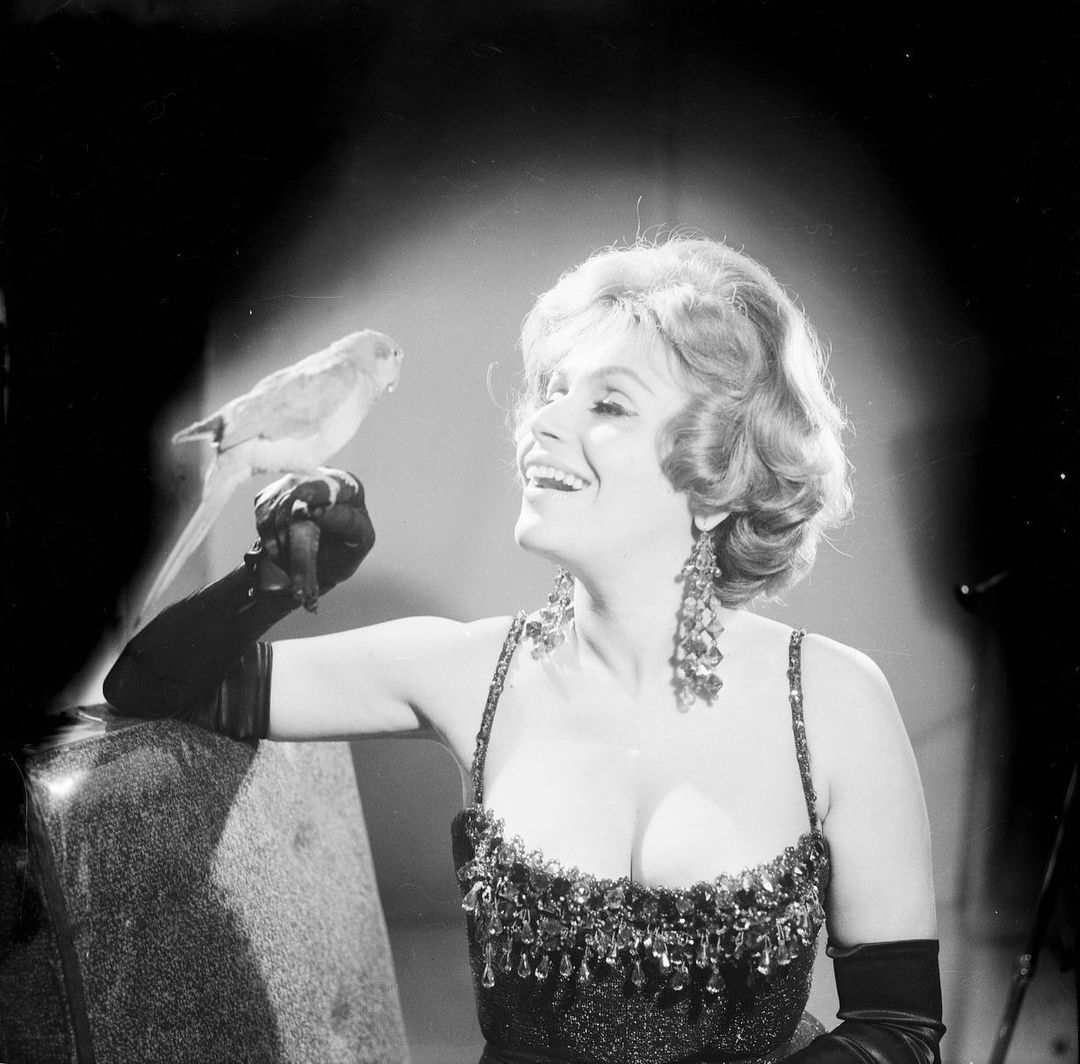
Amelita Vargas in 1964

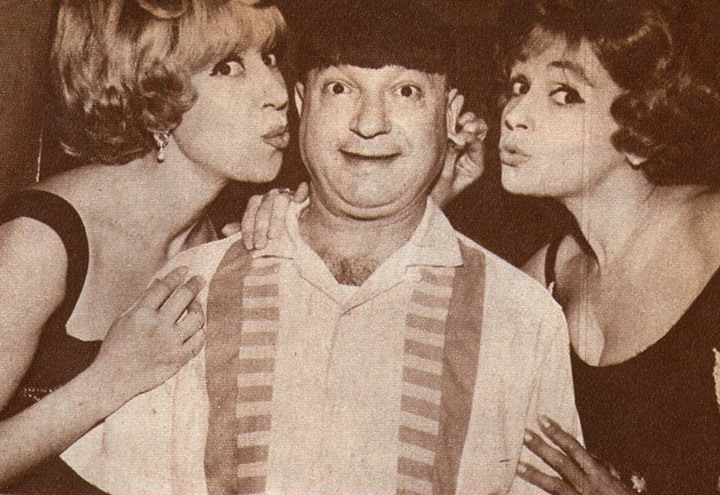
Amelia Vargas (right)

Amelia Vargas (January 16, 1928 in Havana – April 21, 2019 in Buenos Aires) was a Cuban actress and dancer. She mainly worked in Argentina. She starred in the 1950 film Arroz con leche under director Carlos Schlieper.

== Selected filmography ==
- The Phantom of the Operetta (1955)
- Cleopatra Was Candida (1964)
