= Los Pérez García =

- Directed by: Fernando Bolín y Don Napy
- Written by: Oscar Luis Massa, Antonio Corma y Don Napy
- Produced by: Julio Oscar Villarreal y Luis Landini
- Starring: Martín Zabalúa, Sara Prósperi, Juan Carlos Altavista, Julián Bourges. Gustavo Cavero, Manolita Poli, Pedro Prevosti, Beatriz Taibo, Paula Darlán, Celia Geraldy, Carlos Ginés, Mario Clavel Orquesta Francini Portier Arturo Arcari
- Cinematography: Roque Giacovino
- Edited by: Javier Aurelio Ruggieri
- Music by: Argentino Galván
- Release date: 1 February 1950
- Running time: 75 minute
- Country: Argentina
- Language: Spanish

Los Pérez García is a 1950 film of the classical era of Argentine cinema.

== Cast ==
Martín Zabalúa, Sara Prósperi, Juan Carlos Altavista, Julián Bourges. Gustavo Cavero, Manolita Poli, Pedro Prevosti, Beatriz Taibo, Paula Darlán, Celia Geraldy, Carlos Ginés, Mario Clavel Orquesta Francini Portier Arturo Arcari
