= The Three Rats (film) =

- Directed by: Carlos Schlieper
- Written by: Ariel Cortazzo; Samuel Eichelbaum; Jorge Jantus; Alfredo Pareja Díez Canseco
- Starring: Mecha Ortiz; Amelia Bence; María Duval
- Cinematography: Mario Pagés; Bob Roberts
- Edited by: Oscar Carchano; Gori Muñoz
- Music by: Alejandro Gutiérrez del Barrio
- Production company: Estudios San Miguel
- Release date: 7 August 1946
- Running time: 95 minutes
- Country: Argentina
- Language: Spanish

The Three Rats (Spanish:Las Tres Ratas) is a 1946 Argentine drama film of the classical era of Argentine cinema, directed by Carlos Schlieper and starring Mecha Ortiz, Amelia Bence and María Duval. It is an adaptation of Alfredo Pareja Diezcanseco's 1944 novel of the same title.

== Cast ==
- Mecha Ortiz as Mercedes de la Fuente
- Amelia Bence as Eugenia de la Fuente
- María Duval as Ana Luisa de la Fuente
- Miguel Faust Rocha as Alfredo Millán
- Santiago Gómez Cou as Ernesto Carbó
- Ricardo Passano as Oscar Aranda
- Felisa Mary as Aurora de la Fuente
- Floren Delbene as Carlos
- Amalia Sánchez Ariño as Consuelo
- Juan José Piñeyro as Zabala
- Lalo Bouhier as Inspector de policía
- Aurelia Ferrer as Bernarda
- Cirilo Etulain as Horacio Saldaña
- Gonzalo Palomero as Capataz
- Jorge Villoldo as Mozo
- Jorge Eamboez as Amigo
- Nélida Romero as Modista 1
- Soledad Marcó as Modista 2
- Marcelo Lavalle as Muchacho
- Estela Vidal as Mucama
- Francisco Audenino

== Bibliography ==
- Plazaola, Luis Trelles. South American Cinema. La Editorial, UPR, 1989.
