= María Esther Podestá =

Argentine actress (1896–1983)

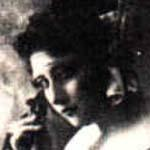
- Born: November 24, 1896; Buenos Aires, Argentina
- Died: September 18, 1983 (aged 86); Buenos Aires, Argentina
- Occupation: Actress
- Years active: 1917-1977

María Esther Podestá (1896–1983) was an Argentine actress. She starred in the 1950 film Arroz con leche directed by Carlos Schlieper.

She was married to Carlos Goicoechea and Segundo Pomar.

== Selected filmography ==
- Juan Moreira (1936)
- Un bebé de París (1941)
- Madame Bovary (1947)
- El Muerto es un vivo (1953)
