= The Honourable Tenant =

1951 film

- Directed by: Carlos Schlieper
- Written by: Ariel Cortazzo; Carlos Schlieper
- Produced by: Juan Parret; Jean de Bravura
- Starring: Alberto Closas; Olga Zubarry; Amalia Sánchez Ariño
- Cinematography: Vicente Cosentino
- Edited by: José Cardella
- Music by: Peter Kreuder
- Production company: Interamericana
- Release date: 27 December 1951
- Running time: 81 minutes
- Country: Argentina
- Language: Spanish

The Honourable Tenant (Spanish:El Honorable inquilino) is a 1951 Argentine comedy film of the classical era of Argentine cinema, directed by Carlos Schlieper and starring Alberto Closas, Olga Zubarry and Amalia Sánchez Ariño. The film's sets were designed by Carlos T. Dowling.

== Cast ==
- Alberto Closas as Luis Ayala
- Olga Zubarry as Ana María
- Amalia Sánchez Ariño as Alfonsina
- Osvaldo Miranda as Martín
- Pedro Quartucci as Juancho
- Severo Fernandez as Mr. Larica
- Nélida Romero as Elena
- Hugo Pimentel as Fredo
- Amalia Bernabé as Ernestina
- Pablo Cumo as Lorenzo Corsi
- Elda Dessel as Rosalía
- Carmen Giménez as Sra. González
- Miguel Bebán
- Adelaida Demichelis
- Roberto Durán
- Enrique Fava
- Julio Heredia
- Alberto Lenti
- Edda Mancini
- Arsenio Perdiguero
- Norma Suarez
