= An Almost Merry Widow =

- Directed by: Román Viñoly Barreto
- Written by: José María Fernández Unsáin
- Cinematography: Antonio Prieto
- Edited by: Gerardo Rinaldi
- Music by: Bert Rosé
- Release date: 23 November 1950
- Running time: 90 minute
- Country: Argentina
- Language: Spanish

An Almost Merry Widow (Spanish: Una viuda casi alegre) is a 1950 Argentine film directed by Román Viñoly Barreto during the classical era of Argentine cinema.

== Cast ==
- Elina Colomer
- Roberto Escalada
- Carlos Thompson
- Andrés Mejuto
- Judith Sulián
- Adolfo Linvel
- Osvaldo Bruzzi
- Gloria Ferrandiz
- Hilda Rey
- Juan Carrera
- Alberto Berco
- Daniel Tedeschi
