= Alejandro Anderson =

Argentine film actor

- Born: Argentina
- Years active: 1950- 1973

Alejandro Anderson (born c. 1930) was an Argentine film actor, of Scottish ancestry.

He entered film in the 1950 classic Abuso de confianza and made over 20 appearances in film between then and 1973. In 1970 he starred in Amalio Reyes, un hombre.
