= Needle in the Haystack =

1953 film directed by Alex Viany

- Directed by: Alex Viany
- Written by: Alex Viany
- Produced by: Rubens Berardo; Moacyr Fenelon
- Cinematography: Mario Pagés
- Edited by: Mario del Río; Rafael Justo Valverde; Alex Viany
- Music by: Cláudio Santoro
- Production companies: Cine Produções Moacyr Fenelon; Flama Filmes
- Distributed by: Cinedistri; Unida Filmes
- Release date: 1953
- Running time: 95 minutes
- Country: Brazil
- Language: Portuguese

Needle in the Haystack (Portuguese: Agulha no Palheiro) is a 1953 Brazilian comedy film directed by Alex Viany.

== Cast ==
- Carmélia Alves
- Roberto Bataglin as Eduardo
- Renée Brown
- Waldomiro Costa
- César Cruz
- Jaudet Cury
- Jackson De Souza as Baiano
- Israel García
- Zizinha Macedo
- Savina Marques
- Dóris Monteiro as Elisa
- Augusta Moreira
- Laís Nascimento
- Carlos Nefa
- Sara Nobre as D. Gisa
- Helba Nogueira
- Lucília Reis
- Manoel Rocha
- Fada Santoro as Mariana
- Maurício Silva
- Hélio Souto as José da Silva
- Miguel Torres
- Solano Trindade
- Alex Viany

== Bibliography ==
- Alberto Elena & Marina Díaz López. The Cinema of Latin America. Columbia University Press, 2013.
