= Juan Bono =

Argentine actor

- Born: 1893; Argentina
- Died: March 1979 (aged 85–86); Argentina
- Occupation: Actor
- Years active: 1936-1964 (film)

Juan Bono (1893-1979) was an Argentine stage and film actor. He appeared in eighteen films during his career, most during the Golden Age of Argentine Cinema.

== Selected filmography ==
- Paths of Faith (1938)
- The Abyss Opens (1945)
- Savage Pampas (1945)
- Puppet (1957)

== Bibliography ==
- Finkielman, Jorge. The Film Industry in Argentina: An Illustrated Cultural History. McFarland, 24 Dec 2003.
