= Rebellion (1954 film) =

- Directed by: José Antonio Nieves Conde
- Written by: José Antonio Nieves Conde; José María Pemán (play); Gonzalo Torrente Ballester
- Produced by: Hans-Georg Hübner; Albino Sanz; Manuel Torres
- Starring: Delia Garcés; Fernando Fernán Gómez; Volker von Collande
- Cinematography: Francisco Sempere
- Music by: Miguel Asins Arbó; Juan Quintero
- Production companies: Aafa-Film; Imago; Osa Films
- Distributed by: CIFESA (Spain)
- Release date: 22 April 1954
- Running time: 89 minutes
- Countries: Spain; West Germany
- Language: Spanish

Rebellion (Spanish:Rebeldía, German:Duell der Herzen) is a 1954 Spanish-German drama film directed by José Antonio Nieves Conde and starring Delia Garcés, Fernando Fernán Gómez and Volker von Collande.

== Plot ==
An author of novels has no scruples and starts to break the resistance of a young girl with solid moral convictions who is in love with him.

== Cast ==
- Delia Garcés as Margarita
- Fernando Fernán Gómez as Federico Lanuza
- Volker von Collande as Carlos Maraga
- Dina Sten as Germaine
- Fernando Rey as Capellán
- Rafael Arcos as Miguel
- Félix Dafauce as Doctor Sánchez
- José Prada as Médico de provincia
- Francisco Bernal as Pedro
- Társila Criado as Marcela
- Inés Pérez Indarte as Pescadora
- Arsenio Freignac
- Henri Bartx
- Fernando Heiko Vassel
- Juan Stenzel
- José María Rodríguez
- María Luisa as Niña
- José Antonio as Niño

== Bibliography ==
- Monserrat Claveras Pérez. La Pasión de Cristo en el cine. Encuentro, 2011.
