= Las Venganzas de Beto Sánchez =

- Directed by: Héctor Olivera
- Written by: Ricardo Talesnik
- Starring: Pepe Soriano; Federico Luppi; Irma Roy; China Zorrilla
- Cinematography: Victor Hugo Caula
- Edited by: Oscar Montauti
- Music by: Oscar López Ruiz
- Production company: Aries Cinematográfica Argentina
- Distributed by: Aries Cinematográfica Argentina
- Release date: 1973
- Running time: 85 minutes
- Country: Argentina
- Language: Spanish

Las Venganzas de Beto Sánchez (English: Beto Sanchez's Vendettas) is a 1973 Argentine dramatic comedy film directed by Héctor Olivera and starring Pepe Soriano, Federico Luppi, Irma Roy, China Zorrilla and Héctor Alterio.

== Plot ==
A man named Beto Sánchez, seeing his father dying in hospital, decides to get revenge on those who according to him made his life worse: his elementary school teacher, his childhood friend, his first wife, his superior in the military service and his first job's boss.
