= Manuel Alcón =

Argentine film actor and musician

Manuel Alcón (died 1962) was an Argentine film actor and musician.

Alcón began acting for film in 1937 and made over 30 film appearances between then and his death in 1962. He appeared in films such as Almafuerte (1949) and Abuso de confianza in 1950.

== Filmography ==
- Mago de las finanzas, El (1962)
- Televisor, El (1962)
- Tiernas ilusiones (1961)
- "Arsenio Lupin" (1961) (mini) TV Series
- "¿Es usted el asesino?" (1961) (mini) TV Series
- Fantasma de la opereta, El (1960)
- "Figura de cera, La" (1960) (mini) TV Series
- Obras maestras del terror (1960)
- Desert Warrior (1957)
- Viuda difícil, Una (1957)
- Fierecilla domada, La (1956)
- The Phantom of the Operetta (1955)
- Tren internacional (1954)
- Siete gritos en el mar (1954)
- Yo soy el criminal (1954)
- Trompada 45 (1953)
- Malaire (1952)
- Parda Flora, La (1952)
- Payaso (1952)
- Llévame contigo (1951)
- Cosas de mujer (1951)
- My Divine Poverty (1951)
- Culpa la tuvo el otro, La (1950) .... Cartero
- Abuso de confianza (1950)
- Barra de la esquina, La (1950)
- Escuela de campeones (1950)
- Toscanito y los detectives (1950) .... Sebastián, el camarero
- Vendedora de fantasías, La (1950)
- Almafuerte (1949)
- A Story of the Nineties (1949)
- Don Juan Tenorio (1949)
- Story of a Bad Woman (1948)
- Passport to Rio (1948) .... El Francés
- Siete para un secreto (1947) .... Hombre en posada
- Cumbres de hidalguía (1947)
- Nunca te diré adiós (1947)
- Milagro de amor (1946)
- Llegó la niña Ramona (1945)
- La pródiga (1945)
- Importancia de ser ladrón, La (1944)
- Novia en apuros, Una (1942)
- Bajó un ángel del cielo (1942)
- Su primer baile (1942)
- Yo quiero morir contigo (1941) .... Conserje
- By the Light of a Star (1941)
- Fronteras de la ley (1941)
- Hay que casar a Ernesto (1941)
- Bebé de contrabando, Un (1940)
- Y los sueños pasan (1939)
- Con las alas rotas (1938) .... Mucamo
- Melgarejo (1937) .... Liborio
