= La delatora =

La Delatora
- Directed by: Kurt Land
- Written by: Ariel Cortazzo
- Produced by: Jaime Cabouli
- Cinematography: Américo Hoss
- Music by: Anatole Pietri
- Production companies: Córdoba Films; Guaranteed Pictures
- Release date: 18 June 1955
- Running time: 90 minutes
- Country: Argentina
- Language: Spanish

La delatora [The Informant] is a 1955 Argentine crime film directed by Kurt Land. It was theatrically released in Argentina on 18 June 1955.

== Cast ==
- Arturo Arcari
- Alberto Bacigaluppi
- Virgilio Barbatti
- Alberto Bello
- Amalia Bernabé
- Luis Boldoni
- Susana Campos
- Domingo Carlos
- Carlos D'Agostino
- Carlos Estrada
- Víctor Ferreyra
- Carmen Giménez
- Francisco Lizzio
- Diana Maggi
- Víctor Martucci
- Lautaro Murúa
- Miguel A. Olmos
- Nathán Pinzón
- Julio Portela
- Georges Rivière
- Fada Santoro
- Jaime Saslavsky
- Osvaldo Terranova
- Félix Tortorelli
- Luis Veilat
- Enrique Waiss
