= El Muerto es un vivo =

1953 film

- Directed by: Yago Blass
- Narrated by: Harry Mimmo
- Music by: George Andreani
- Release date: 1953
- Running time: 69 minute
- Country: Argentina
- Language: Spanish

El Muerto es un vivo is a 1953 Argentine film directed by Yago Blass during the classical era of Argentine cinema.

== Cast ==
- Harry Mimmo
- Diana de Córdoba
- Ramón Garay
- María Esther Podestá
- Carlos Lagrotta
- Marisa Núñez
- Ángel Walk
