= Irma Roy =

Argentinian actor and politician

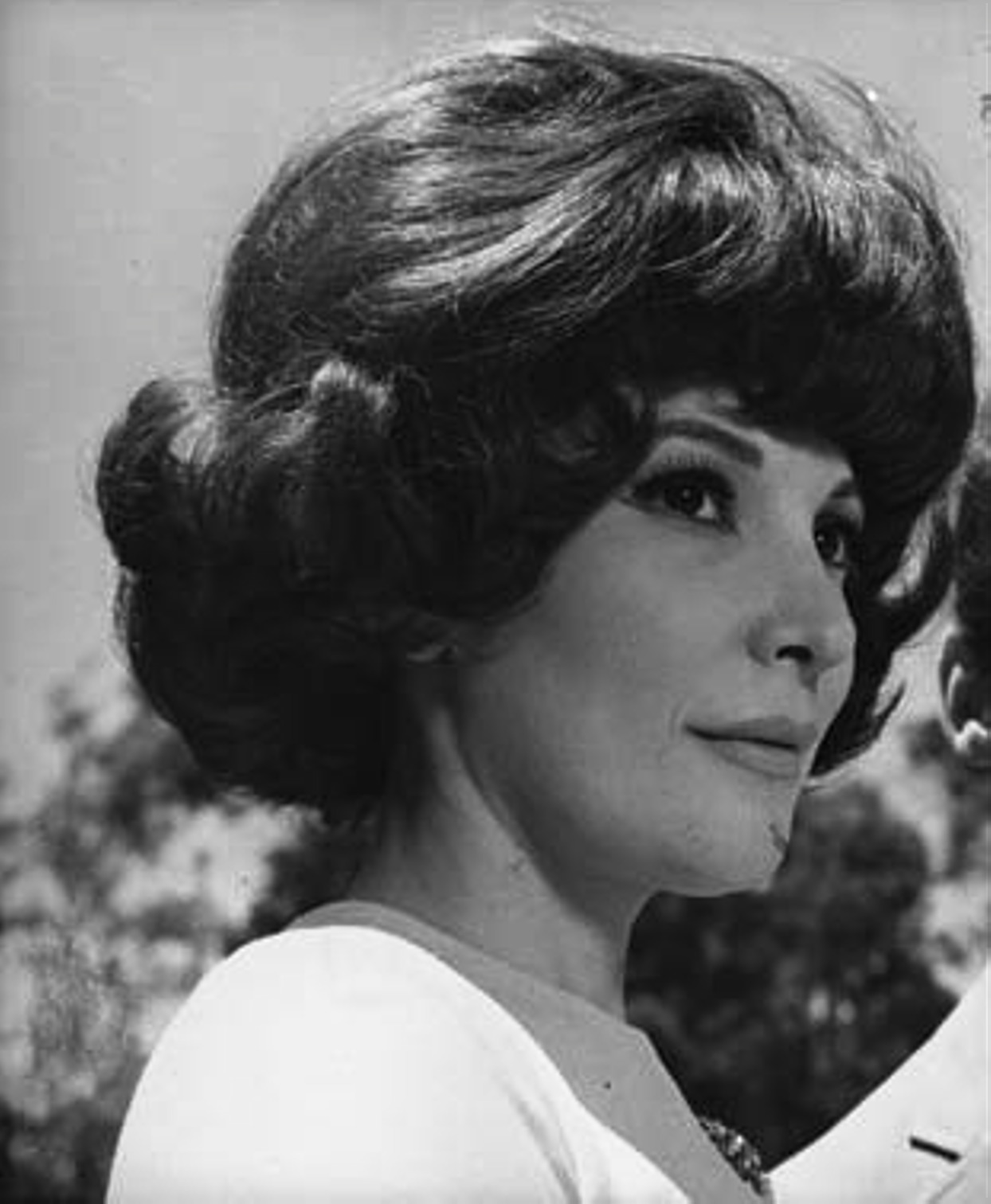
- Roy in El Derecho a la felicidad (1968)

National Deputy
- In office 10 December 2001 – 10 December 2005
- Constituency: Buenos Aires
- In office 10 December 1987 – 10 December 1999
- Constituency: Buenos Aires

Personal details
- Born: 10 June 1932 Buenos Aires
- Died: 14 June 2016 (aged 84) Buenos Aires
- Party: Justicialist Party
- Children: Carolina Papaleo
- Occupation: politician
- Profession: actress

Irma Roy (10 June 1932 – 14 June 2016) was an Argentine actress and politician who served in the Chamber of Deputies from 1995 to 2005. Her daughter, Carolina Papaleo also became an actress. She was married to the actor Eduardo Cuitiño.

As part of the Open Policy for Social Integrity party (PAIS), she unsuccessfully ran for Chief of Government of Buenos Aires in 2000, landing in third place with a little over 4% of the vote.

She died on 14 June 2016 at the age of 84.

== Selected filmography ==
- La serpiente de cascabel (1948)
- Al Compás de tu Mentira (1950)
- Cinco grandes y una chica (1950)
- Historia de una noche de niebla (1950)
- The Beautiful Brummel (1951)
- Caídos en el infierno (1954)
- Requiebro (1955)
- Mi marido y mi novio (1955)
- El Derecho a la felicidad (1968)
- Las Venganzas de Beto Sánchez (1973)
