= Amor se dice cantando =

1959 film

- DVD cover
- Directed by: Miguel Morayta
- Written by: María Luisa Algarra and Emilio Villalba Welsh
- Produced by: Fernando de Fuentes and Rafael Mirko
- Starring: Miguel Aceves Mejía, Julia Sandoval, Paulette Christian
- Edited by: Jorge Gárate
- Release date: 22 February 1959
- Running time: 80 minutes
- Country: Argentina/Mexico
- Language: Spanish

Amor se dice cantando ("Love is Said Singing") is a 1959 Mexican- Argentine comedy-drama film directed by Miguel Morayta, written by María Luisa Algarra and starring Miguel Aceves Mejía, Julia Sandoval and Paulette Christian.

== Cast ==
- Miguel Aceves Mejía
- Julia Sandoval
- Alfredo Almanza
- Paulette Christian
- Luis Dávila
- Tito Licausi
- Mario Pocoví
- María Esther Podestá
- Mariela Reyes
- Ethel Rojo
- Fernando Soto "Mantequilla"

== Release ==
The film was first shown in Mexico on 22 February 1959.
