= Pastor Serrador =

Cuban-born Argentine actor

- Born: Heriberto Pastor Serrador; 27 July 1919; Camagüey, Cuba
- Died: 16 December 2006 (aged 87); Madrid, Spain
- Resting place: Cementerio de la Paz, Alcobendas
- Occupation: Actor
- Spouses: Amalia Britos (1938 – c. 1940); Luisa Sala (1952–1986); María Teresa Alonso (1987–2006)
- Parents: Heriberto Pastor (father); Teresa Serrador (mother)
- Relatives: Esteban Serrador (uncle); Juan Serrador (uncle); Pepita Serrador (aunt)

Heriberto Pastor Serrador was a Cuban-born Argentine actor who lived and worked in Spain beginning in the early 1950s.

== Biography ==
Pastor Serrador was born in Camagüey, Cuba in 1919, the grandson of the actors Esteban Serrador and Josefina Marí. His father was the merchant Heriberto Pastor and his mother was the actress Teresa Serrador, the sister of Esteban, Juan, and Pepita Serrador. He was the first cousin of director Narciso Ibáñez Serrador. His childhood was spent in Argentina, where he began his career as an actor on the radio. He debuted in theater around 1935, and in 1938 he married the Argentine actress Amalia Britos, separating a few years later. From that union his first son would be born.

The pressures to which he was subjected by his activities as secretary of the Argentine Actors Association pushed him to move to Spain, where he married the actress Luisa Sala and took up residence in 1952. That year, he and his wife took part in the play Divorciémonos, and in 1954 he started a small company of his own, premiering the play El sabor del pecado.

Serrador then resumed a prolific interpretive career, in theater, film, and television. On the big screen he starred in such titles as Al fin solos (1955) by José María Elorrieta (with whom he would work on 15 films), Manolo, guardia urbano (1956), The Violet Seller (1958), Culprits (1960), and Course Completed (1987).

He also achieved great success on Spanish stages with the plays En El Escorial, cariño mío, Vidas cruzadas, La Sauvage (1953), El genio alegre (1954), Hoy es fiesta (1956), La ciudad sin Dios (1957), Juana de Lorena (1962), La señal del fuego (1962), Cita en Senlis (1963), La extraña noche de bodas (1963), Alarma (1964), A Midsummer Night's Dream (1964), Mayores con reparos (1966), Atrapar a un asesino (1968), El armario (1969), Por lo menos tres (1969), Olvida los tambores (1970), and Vivamos hoy (1979), the musicals Annie (1981) and The Sound of Music (1982), La pereza (1984), the revue Doña Mariquita de mi corazón (1985), Escuadra hacia la muerte (1989), and La visita que no tocó el timbre (1994).

Present on Televisión Española since the early days of the broadcast medium in Spain, Serrador was part of the cast of one of its first series, Palma y Don Jaime (1959–1960). In successive years he would portray dozens of characters on shows such as Estudio 1, Novela, Primera fila, La comedia musical española (1985), and Platos rotos (1986), the latter with his wife, which would be her last appearance before her sudden death.

After Luisa Sala's death, he married María Teresa Alonso in 1987 and they had one son. He died on 16th December 2006.

== Awards ==
- Gold medal from the Ministry of Information and Tourism (1970)
- Gold medal from the Ministry of Culture (1977)

== Television appearances ==
- Palma y Don Jaime (1959–1960)
- Gran Teatro
  - Arsenic and Old Lace (23 July 1961)
- Novela
  - Robo en el subexpreso (27 May 1963)
  - El bosque encantado (19 June 1967)
  - La dama vestida de blanco (25 September 1967)
  - Emma (13 November 1967)
  - El gabinete de sueños (20 November 1967)
  - El abuelo tiene 30 años (3 February 1969)
  - Flores para Elena (9 February 1970)
  - La Ínsula Barataria (27 September 1970)
  - Las mariposas cantan (15 November 1970)
  - Mamá (30 November 1970)
  - Consultorio sentimental (25 January 1971)
  - Las aventuras del Marqués de Letorière (31 December 1973)
  - Pequeñeces (8 March 1976)
  - Olivia (14 March 1977)
  - Lord Arthur Savile's Crime (8 May 1978)
- Primera fila
  - El baile (28 June 1963)
  - Pygmalion (6 May 1964)
  - Una ciudad en el aire (10 March 1965)
- Estudio 1
  - The Crucible (22 February 1965)
  - Cincuenta años de felicidad (11 January 1966)
  - En Flandes se ha puesto el sol (19 July 1967)
  - Legítima defensa (20 September 1967)
  - Me casé con un ángel (4 May 1973)
  - Un cochino egoísta (9 November 1973)
  - Alta fidelidad (1 September 1975)
  - Sinfonía inacabada (9 May 1979)
  - La prudencia en la mujer (26 October 1980)
  - Margarita y los hombres (1 May 1981)
  - Una aventura en la niebla (25 December 1981)
  - La mamma (7 March 1983)
- Estudio 3
  - Un invento aprovechado (28 August 1965)
- La pequeña comedia
  - "Llamada a medianoche" (3 October 1966)
  - "El ensayo" (14 February 1968)
- Y al final esperanza
  - "El weekend de Andromaca" (18 February 1967)
- Historias naturales
  - "Peces en la carretera" (4 July 1968)
- Escritores en televisión
  - "Un extraño en la noche" (13 November 1968)
- Remite: Maribel
  - "Cariños que matan" (1 January 1970)
- Personajes a trasluz
  - "Fausto" (9 June 1970)
- Las tentaciones
  - "La escuela de los padres" (19 October 1970)
- A través de la niebla
  - "El pasado del Profesor Legrand" (18 October 1971)
- Buenas noches, señores
  - "Esta vida difícil" (12 July 1972)
- Historias de Juan Español
  - "Juan Español, solterón" (25 October 1972)
  - "Juan Español y los snobs" (6 December 1972)
- Noche de teatro
  - "El abogado del diablo" (13 September 1974)
- El quinto jinete
  - "El misterio" (31 December 1975)
- Curro Jiménez
  - "En la sierra mando yo" (5 March 1978)
- Teatro breve
  - "Corazones y diamantes" (13 November 1980)
- Nunca es tarde (1984)
- La comedia musical española
  - Las Leandras (15 October 1985)
  - Róbame esta noche (5 November 1985)
  - La cuarta de A. Polo (19 November 1985)
- Platos rotos
  - "Julia de los espíritus" (30 October 1985)
  - "Sábado, maldito sábado" (25 December 1985)
- La voz humana
  - "10.000 libras" (22 August 1986)
- La comedia dramática española
  - Diálogo secreto (25 September 1986)
- Primera función
  - Enseñar a un sinvergüenza (4 May 1989)
- Farmacia de guardia
  - "Final de etapa" (1 January 1991)
- Señor alcalde
  - "Grandes inversiones" (11 February 1998)
- El comisario
  - "El diablo en el cuerpo" (5 June 2000)
