= Espionage in Tangier =

- Directed by: Gregg C. Tallas
- Written by: R. Belgrozo
- Story by: Herbert Curiel
- Music by: Benedetto Ghiglia
- Release date: 1965
- Countries: Spain; Italy
- Language: Spanish

Espionage in Tangier (Spanish: Marc Mato, agente S. 077, Italian: S.077 spionaggio a Tangeri) is a 1965 Spanish-Italian spy film, inspired by James Bond and directed by Gregg C. Tallas.

== Plot ==
A secret agent is assigned to capture a criminal gang that is threatening to destroy Earth with a death ray.

== Cast ==
- Luis Dávila as Mike Murphy / Agent S 077
- José Greci as Lea
- Perla Cristal as Madeleine
- Ana Castor as Madame Stanier
- Alfonso Rojas as Prof. Grave
- Alberto Dalbés as Rigo Orel
- Tomás Blanco
- Barta Barry
- Alberto Cevenini
- Amparo Díaz
- Juan Cafinos
- Rafael Vaquero
