= Abuso de confianza =

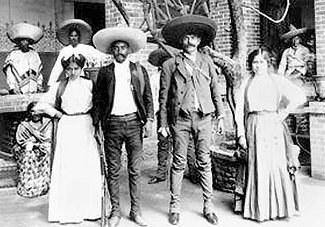
- Film promotional shot
- Directed by: Mario C. Lugones
- Written by: Pierre Wolff; Julio Porter
- Produced by: Mario C. Lugones
- Starring: Manuel Alcón; Carlos Bellucci; Iris Alonso; María Armand
- Cinematography: Alfredo Traverso
- Edited by: Oscar Orzábal Quintana
- Music by: George Andreani
- Production company: Lumiton
- Release date: 21 September 1950
- Running time: 77 minutes
- Country: Argentina
- Language: Spanish

Abuso de confianza (English: Breach of Trust) is a 1950 Argentine drama film of the classical era of Argentine cinema, directed by Mario C. Lugones and written by Julio Porter. It was based on the novel Abus de confiance by Pierre Wolff. Starring Manuel Alcón and Iris Alonso.

== Cast ==
- Manuel Alcón
- Iris Alonso
- Alejandro Anderson
- María Armand
- Carlos Bellucci
- Mario Roque Benigno
- Arnoldo Chamot
- Manuel Collado
- Margarita Corona
- Renée Dumas
- Celia Geraldy
- Juan Latrónico
- Adolfo Linvel
- Sergio Malbrán
- José Nájera
- Juan Pecci
- Nélida Romero
- Maria Elena Sagrera
- Carlos Thompson
- Jorge Villoldo
- Olga Zubarry
- Dora Zular

== Release ==
The film was released on 21 September 1950.

== See also ==
- Abused Confidence (1938)
