= Lalo Hartich =

Argentine actor

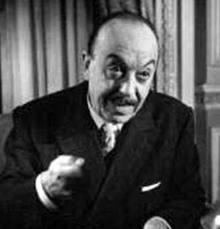
Lalo Hartich

Lalo Hartich (29 December 1904, in Buenos Aires – 31 March 1979, in Buenos Aires) was an Argentine actor. He starred in the 1950 film Arroz con leche under director Carlos Schlieper.

== Selected filmography ==
- The Phantom of the Operetta (1955)
