= Juan Alighieri =

Argentine film actor

- Born: Argentina
- Years active: 1949 – 1978

Juan Alighieri was an Argentine film actor. He is known for Muchacho que vas cantando (1971), Un guapo del 900 (1971) and Póker de amantes para tres (1969).

== Filmography ==
- Almafuerte (1949)
- El Seductor (1950) .... Julián Rosales 2
- Suburb (1951)
- Derecho viejo (1951)
- La Dama del mar (1954)
- Los Problemas de papá (1954)
- La Calle del pecado (1954)
- Caídos en el infierno (1954) .... Empleado agencia de viajes
- El Barro humano (1955) .... Manolo
- Amor prohibido (1958)
- Mi esqueleto (1959)
- "Posesa, La" (1961) TV series
- Canuto Cañete, conscripto del 7 (1963)
- Orden de matar (1965) .... Assistante de Mauro
- Martín Fierro (1968) .... The Guacho Envamada
- Póker de amantes para tres (1969)
- Los muchachos de antes no usaban gomina (1969)
- Amalio Reyes, un hombre (1970)
- Joven, viuda y estanciera (1970)
- Con alma y vida (1970) .... Hombre en cárcel
- Muchacho que vas cantando (1971)
- Un Guapo del 900 (1971)
- La Gran ruta (1971)
- La Maffia (1972) .... Hombre en reñidero
- Adiós, Alejandra, Andrea (1973)
- Boquitas pintadas (1974)
- Soñar, soñar (1976)
- ¿Qué es el otoño? (1977)
- Un Idilio de estación (1978)

== External links and sources ==
- Juan Alighieri at IMDb
