= Fada Santoro =

Brazilian actress (1924–2024)

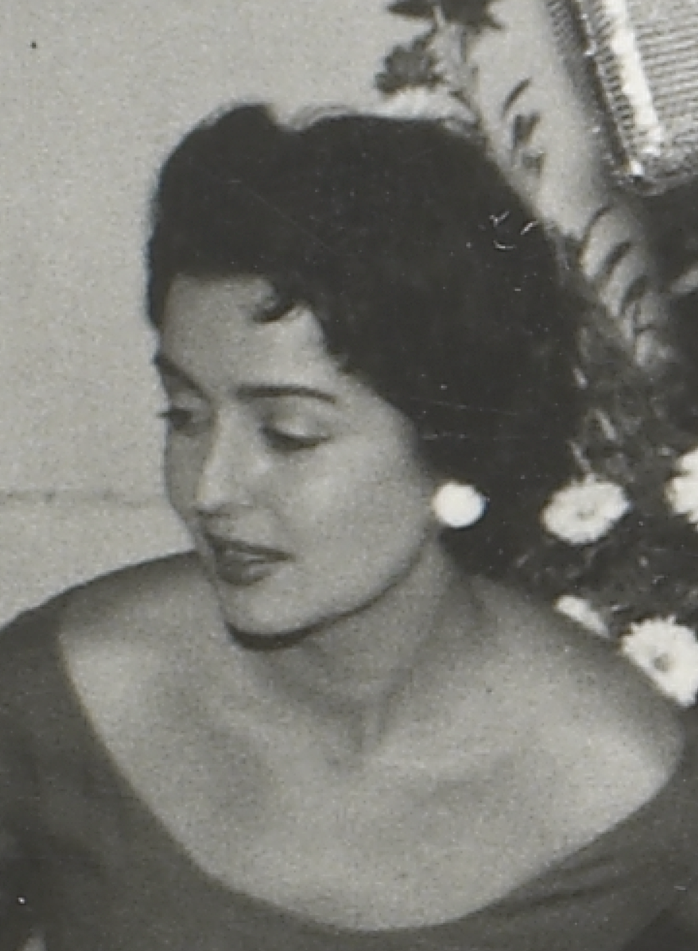
- Santoro in 1955
- Born: Mafalda Basílio Monteiro dos Santos; 29 August 1924; Rio de Janeiro, Brazil
- Died: 15 December 2024 (aged 100); Rio de Janeiro, Brazil
- Occupation: Actress
- Years active: 1936–1958

Mafalda Basílio Monteiro dos Santos (29 August 1924 – 15 December 2024) was a Brazilian actress, active in the country's classic era.

== Life and career ==
Santoro was born in Rio de Janeiro on 29 August 1924. Fada began her career at a very young age, working as a dancer in the Alda Garrido Company and later as a crooner in casinos in the 1940s.

Her debut as an actress in cinema was at the end of the 1930s in the film O Samba da Vida, having made several appearances until becoming established in 1949 in the film A Escrava Isaura, beginning the couple's cinematographic fame alongside the actor Cyll Farney. They later starred in Pecado de Nina and Tocaia, both from 1951. Due to her fame in Brazilian cinema, she was invited to participate in the Argentine films La Delatora (1955) and África Ríe (1956).

She retired from acting in the late 1950s when she got married and dedicated herself to family.

Santoro died in Rio de Janeiro on 15 December 2024, at the age of 100.

== Filmography ==
- O Boca de Ouro (1957)
- O Capanga (1957) - Angela
- Africa Rie (1956) - Gloria
- La Delatora (1955) - Celina Rodriguez
- Detective (1954)
- Nem Sansão Nem Dalila (1954) – Miriam
- Needle in the Haystack (1953) – Mariana
- Forca Do Amor (1952)
- Tocaia (1951)
- Milagre de Amor (1951) - Teresa
- O Pecado de Nina (1950) - Nina
- Pra La de Bora (1949)
- A Escrava Isaura (1949) - Isaura
- Pif-Paf (1945)
- Romance Poribido (1944)
- Berlin to the Samba Beat (1944)
- Maridinho de Luxo (1938)
- Samba da Vida (1937)
