= Héctor Canziani =

Argentine poet, screenwriter and film director

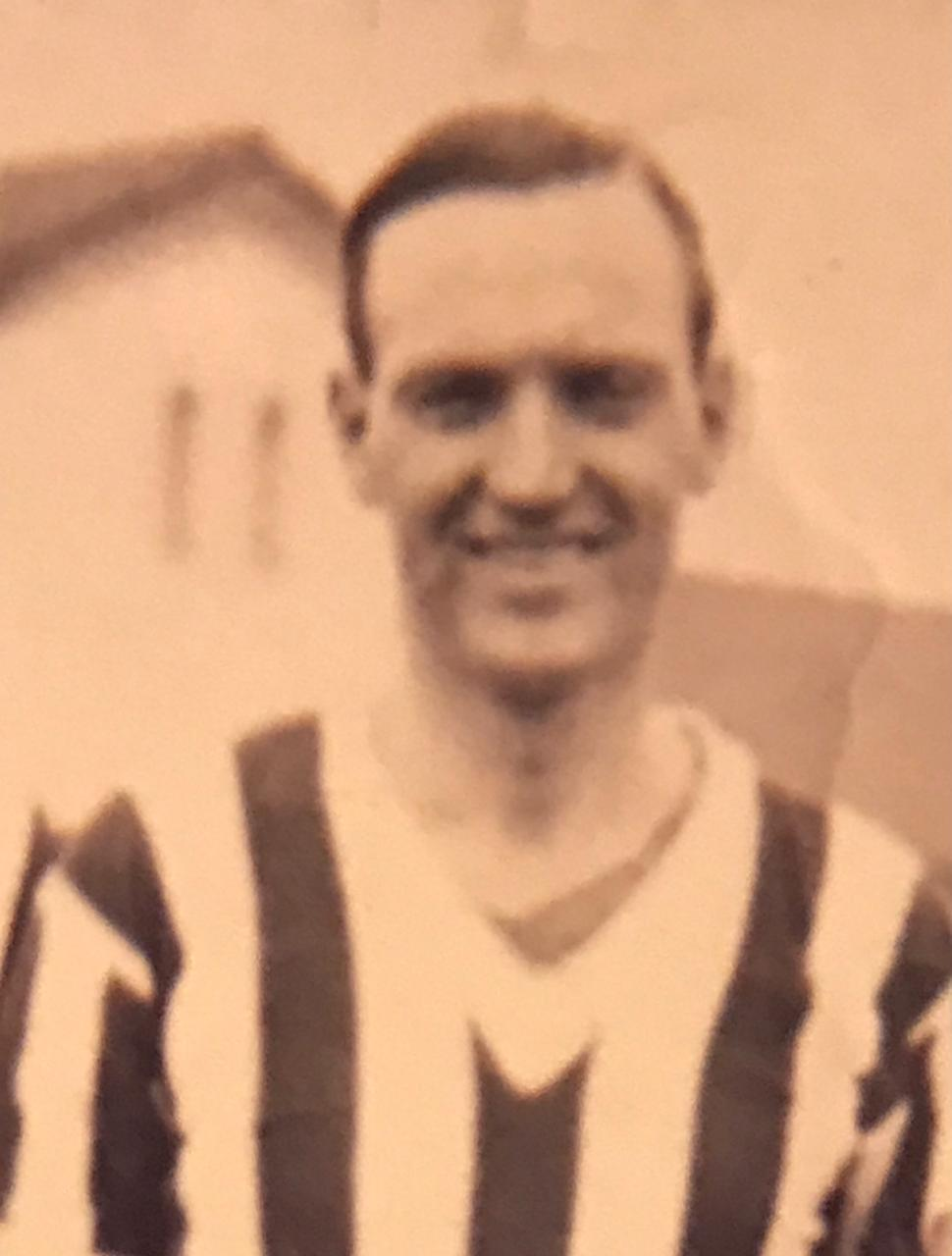

Héctor Canziani was an Argentine poet, screenwriter and film director who worked in Argentine cinema in the 1940s and 1950s. Although his work was most abundant in screenwriting and poetry after his brief film career, he is best known for his directorship and production of the 1950 tango dancing film Al Compás de tu Mentira based on a play by Oscar Wilde.
