= Ensayo final =

- Release date: 1955
- Running time: 90 minute
- Country: Argentina
- Language: Spanish

Ensayo final is a 1955 Argentine film. Alberto Closas played the main role. It was directed by Mario C. Lugones.
