= Millones de Semillita =

- Directed by: Frederic Bernheim D'Acosta
- Release date: 1950
- Country: Argentina
- Language: Spanish

Millones de Semillita is a 1950 film of the classical era of Argentine cinema. Beatriz Taibo made her film debut in this film.

== Cast ==
- Beatriz Taibo
