= Tono Andreu =

Argentine film actor

- Born: 1915; Gualeguay, Entre Ríos, Argentina
- Died: 28 February 1981 (aged 65–66)
- Other name: Antonio Tomás Andreu
- Occupation: Actor
- Years active: 1942-1981 (film)

Tono Andreu (1915–1981) was an Argentine film actor. He was the brother of Gogó Andreu, who was also an actor and musician.

== Selected filmography ==
- Campeón a la fuerza (1950)
- The Phantom of the Operetta (1955)
- Hotel alojamiento (1966)
- Would You Marry Me? (1967)
- Aquellos años locos (1971)
- La familia hippie (1971)

== Bibliography ==
- Peter Cowie & Derek Elley. World Filmography: 1967. Fairleigh Dickinson University Press, 1977.
