= Perla Achával =

Argentine actress

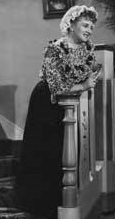
- Achával in a scene filmed in 1954
- Occupation: Actress

Perla Achával (fl. 1945–1955) was an Argentine actress. She starred in the 1950 film Arroz con leche.
