= The Phantom of the Operetta (1955 film) =

- Film poster
- Directed by: Enrique Carreras
- Written by: René Marcial; Manuel Rey; Alfredo Ruanova
- Starring: Alfredo Barbieri; Amelia Vargas; Tono Andreu
- Cinematography: Alfredo Traverso
- Edited by: José Gallego
- Music by: Víctor Slister
- Production company: Cinematográfica General Belgrano
- Release date: 24 June 1955
- Running time: 80 minutes
- Country: Argentina
- Language: Spanish

The Phantom of the Operetta (Spanish:El Fantasma de la opereta) is a 1955 Argentine musical comedy film directed by Enrique Carreras and starring Alfredo Barbieri, Amelia Vargas and Tono Andreu. The film premiered on 24 June 1955. The film's sets were designed by the art director Óscar Lagomarsino.

The film is comedy horror-themed, evoking horror characters such as Frankenstein's monster, Count Dracula and the Wolf Man.

== Plot ==
A group of musical comedy actors try to save a failing operetta house from becoming a pizzeria, enlisting the help of the mysterious Don Gaspar and his perhaps real collection of classic horror monsters.

== Cast ==
- Alfredo Barbieri
- Amelia Vargas
- Tono Andreu
- Gogó Andreu
- Inés Fernández
- Mario Baroffio
- Alfonso Pisano
- Manuel Alcón
- Lalo Hartich

== Reception ==
El Mundo opined that the film was a: "Luck of a pirouette supported by the obligatory convention of the case." La Nación wrote:: "Evocations of the famous Frankenstein, Dracula and the Wolf Man, dominators of serious films, appear in this comedy of scares and jokes with music, animation and very lively rhythms."
