= Paulette Christian =

Argentinian actor

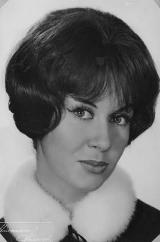
Paulette Christian

Paulette Christian (née, Paulette Sandan; 1927 in Nice, France – November 20, 1967, in Buenos Aires, Argentina) was a French–Argentine vedette, singer and actress of film, theater and television who had a long career in Argentina. Christian had been a member of the anti-Nazi resistance during World War II. She spent seven years in the US. She made her acting career during Argentina's golden age of film and television. She appeared with José Cibrian, Osvaldo Miranda, Angel Magaña, Zulma Faiad, Jorge Larrea, Susana Campos, Amelia Bence, among others. She debuted on television in 1955. She was a pioneer in the French bataclanas style in Argentina, along with May Avril and Xénia Monty. She died by suicide in 1967.

== Filmography ==
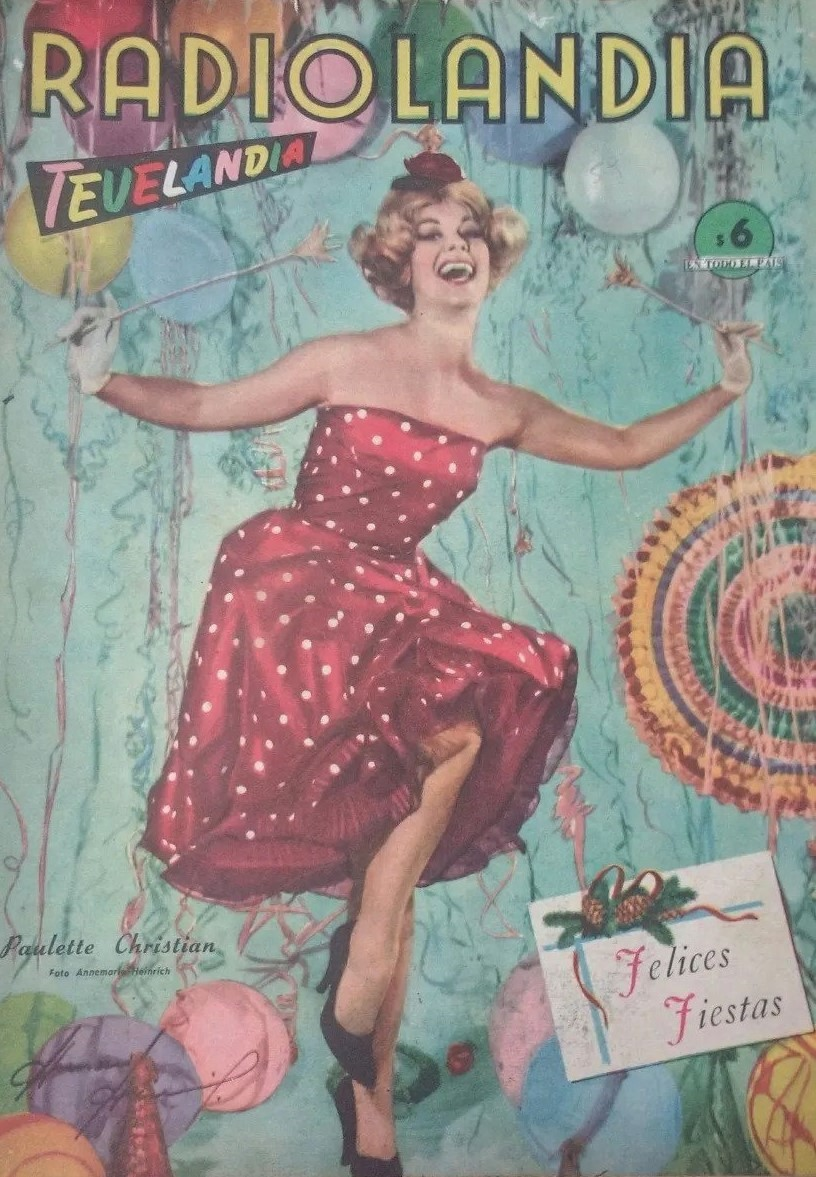
Paulette Christian by Annemarie Heinrich (1959)

- Cuidado con las colas (1964)
- El campeón soy yo (1960) (produced in 1955)
- Amor se dice cantando (1957)
- Mi marido y mi novio (1955)

=== Television ===
- 1955: Tres valses
- 1956: Comedias musicales
- 1956: La abuela, la juventud y el amor
- 1956: Noches elegantes
- 1957: Bohemia
- 1958: Él, ella y los otros
- 1959: La azafata enamorada
- 1959: Amores cruzados
- 1960: Tropicana Club
- 1963: Un señor Locatti
- 1965: El Especial

=== Theater ===
- Polydora
- Un ruiseñor cantaba
- El signo de Kikota (1963)
- Boeing-Boeing (1964)
- Delicado equilibrio (1967)
