= Al Compás de tu Mentira =

Al compás de tu mentira
- Directed by: Héctor Canziani
- Written by: Abel Santacruz; Oscar Wilde (play)
- Produced by: Héctor Canziani
- Starring: Francisco Álvarez; Pedro Quartucci
- Cinematography: Vicente Cosentino
- Edited by: Nicolás Proserpio
- Music by: Rodolfo Sciammarella
- Distributed by: Cosmos Film
- Release date: 22 March 1950
- Running time: 86 minutes
- Country: Argentina
- Language: Spanish

Al compás de tu mentira (English: To the Compass of Your Lie) is a 1950 Argentine musical film of the classical era of Argentine cinema, directed by Héctor Canziani. The film was adapted from Oscar Wilde's 1895 play The Importance of Being Earnest by Abel Santacruz. The film starred Francisco Álvarez and Pedro Quartucci.

The film is based on tango dancing, an integral part of the culture of Buenos Aires.

== Cast ==

- Francisco Álvarez
- Anaclara Bell
- Jorge Casal
- Alfredo De Angelis
- Delfy de Ortega
- Domingo Federico
- Héctor Gagliardi
- Ramón Garay
- Herminia Llorente
- Osmar Maderna
- Lalo Maura
- Margarita Palacios
- Pedro Quartucci
- Irma Roy
- Olga Vilmar

== Release ==
The film premiered on 22 March 1950.
