= Mario C. Lugones =

Argentine film director

Mario Lugones
- Born: Mario C. Lugones; 13 August 1912; Buenos Aires, Argentina
- Died: 1 October 1970 (aged 58); Buenos Aires, Argentina
- Occupation: Actor
- Years active: 1944–1962

Mario C. Lugones (born 13 August 1912 – 1 October 1970 Buenos Aires) was an Argentine film director of the classical era of Argentine cinema. He directed films such as the 1950 film Abuso de confianza.

Lugones died in 1970 of cancer in Buenos Aires.

== Filmography ==
Director

1944 – Se rematan ilusiones
1947 – El Último guapo
1948 – Novio, marido y amante, La Locura de Don Juan
1949 – Un Pecado por mes, Miguitas en la cama, Un Hombre solo no vale nada
1950 – El Zorro pierde el pelo, Abuso de confianza
1951 – Mujer del león, La, Cartas de amor
1952 – ¡Qué rico el mambo!
1954 – La Cueva de Ali-Babá
1955 – Ensayo final, La Simuladora
1962 – Misión 52

Actor

1941 El mejor papá del mundo
1955 La simuladora
