= Felisa Mary =

Spanish-born Argentine film actress

- Born: 7 March 1892; Bilbao, Spain
- Died: 23 August 1956 (aged 64); Buenos Aires, Argentina
- Other name: Felicitas de la Torre
- Occupation: Actress
- Years active: 1939-1956 (film)

Felisa Mary (1892–1956) was a Spanish-born Argentinian film actress. She appeared in more than forty films during her career, which coincided with the Golden Age of Argentine Cinema.

== Selected filmography ==
- When the Heart Sings (1941)
- Sweethearts for the Girls (1941)
- When Spring Makes a Mistake (1944)
- Back in the Seventies (1945)
- The Three Rats (1946)
- The Orchid (1951)
- Detective (1954)

== Bibliography ==
- Finkielman, Jorge. The Film Industry in Argentina: An Illustrated Cultural History. McFarland, 24 Dec 2003.
