= Historia de una noche de niebla =

- Directed by: José María Blanco Felis
- Written by: Cecilio Benítez de Castro
- Starring: Yvonne Bastién; Enrique Chaico; José María Gutiérrez; Antonio Martiáñez; Nathán Pinzón
- Music by: Gumer Barreiros
- Release date: 1950
- Running time: 72 minutes
- Country: Argentina
- Language: Spanish

Historia de una noche de niebla is a 1950 film of the classical era of Argentine cinema. It was directed by José María Blanco Felis and written by Cecilio Benítez de Castro.
