= Carlos Enríquez (actor) =

Uruguayan actor

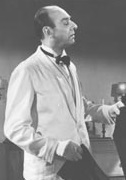
- Enríquez in 1950
- Born: 1898; Uruguay
- Died: 1971 (aged 72–73); Uruguay
- Occupation: Actor
- Years active: 1936–1964

Carlos Enríquez (1898–1971) was an Uruguayan-born actor who worked primarily in Argentina. He starred in the 1950 film Arroz con leche, under director Carlos Schlieper.

== Selected filmography ==
- The Boys of the Old Days Didn't Use Hair Gel (1937)
- A Woman of No Importance (1945)
