= Arroz con leche (1950 film) =

- Directed by: Carlos Schlieper
- Written by: Julio Porter, Carlos Schlieper
- Starring: Malisa Zini; Ángel Magaña; Amelia Vargas
- Cinematography: Humberto Peruzzi
- Edited by: Antonio Ripoll
- Music by: George Andreani
- Distributed by: Emelco
- Release date: 5 October 1950
- Running time: 79 minutes
- Country: Argentina
- Language: Spanish

Arroz con leche (English: Rice with Milk) is a 1950 Argentine romantic comedy film of the classical era of Argentine cinema, directed and written by Carlos Schlieper with Julio Porter based on the play by Carlos Notti, "Noche en Viena". The film premiered on October 5, 1950, in Buenos Aires and was rated PG 14.

== Cast ==
- Perla Achával
- Héctor Calcaño
- Susana Campos
- Perla Cristal
- Virginia de la Cruz
- Lía Durán
- Carlos Enríquez
- Lalo Hartich
- Eliseo Herrero
- Adolfo Linvel
- Ángel Magaña
- Arsenio Perdiguero
- Mario Perelli
- María Esther Podestá
- Hilda Rey
- Nélida Romero
- Esteban Serrador
- Amelia Vargas
- Wanda Were
- Malisa Zini
