= Vicente Cosentino =

Argentine cinematographer

Vicente Cosentino was an Argentine cinematographer, photographer and cameraman who worked on over 40 films produced in Argentina in the 1950s and 1960s.

Cosentino began working in film in 1949 and Al compás de tu mentira was one of his earliest films, working in over 40 films over a twenty-year period, retiring from film in 1969.

== Filmography ==
- The New Bell (1950)
- The Honourable Tenant (1951)
