= Aurelia Ferrer =

Argentine actress

- Occupation: Actress
- Years active: 1939–1960 (film)

Aurelia Ferrer was an Argentine film actress. She appeared in around forty films, generally in supporting roles.

== Partial filmography ==
- The Newsie and the Lady (1938)
- The Englishman of the Bones (1940)
- Noche de bodas (1942)
- The Kids Grow Up (1942)
- The Third Kiss (1942)
- El tercer beso (1943)
- Dieciséis años (1943)
- Swan Song (1945)
- La señora de Pérez se divorcia (1945)
- Savage Pampas (1945) - Micaela
- Where Words Fail (1946)
- The Three Rats (1946) - Bernarda
- El retrato (1947)
- Con el diablo en el cuerpo (1947)
- María de los Ángeles (1948) - Damiana
- Story of a Bad Woman (1948)
- La calle grita (1948)
- De padre desconocido (1949)
- From Man to Man (1949)
- Esposa último modelo (1950)
- La culpa la tuvo el otro (1950) - Dorotea López
- Cuando besa mi marido (1950)
- Los Isleros (1951)
- Cosas de mujer (1951)
- Los árboles mueren de pie (1951)
- De turno con la muerte (1951)
- The Orchid (1951)
- Black Ermine (1953)
- Las tres claves (1953)
- Desalmados en pena (1954)
- Concierto para una lágrima (1955)
- Bendita seas (1956) - Juanita
- Alejandra (1956)
- Después del silencio (1956)
- Cinco gallinas y el cielo (1957)
- La morocha (1958)
- La hermosa mentira (1958)
- El hombre que hizo el milagro (1958)
- Lindor Covas, el cimarrón (1963) - (final film role)

== Bibliography ==
- Jorge Finkielman. The Film Industry in Argentina: An Illustrated Cultural History. McFarland, 2003.
