= Esteban Serrador =

Chilean actor

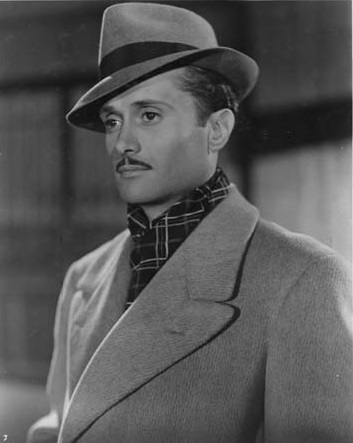
- Serrador in 1940
- Born: April 30, 1903; Santiago, Chile
- Died: June 6, 1978 (aged 75); Buenos Aires, Argentina
- Occupation: Actor

Esteban Serrador (1903–1978) was a Chilean actor. He was mainly involved in Argentine cinema. He starred in the 1950 film Arroz con leche under director Carlos Schlieper.

== Selected filmography ==
- Our Natacha (1944)
- Cristina (1946)
