= Kurt Land =

Argentine film director (1913–1997)

- Born: 19 February 1913; Vienna, Austria
- Died: 13 July 1997 (aged 84); New York City, United States
- Occupations: Film director, film editor

Kurt Landesberger (19 February 1913, Vienna, Austria – 13 July 1997 New York City) was an Austrian born Argentine film director notable for his work during the classical era of Argentine cinema. He is better known as Kurt Land.

== Life ==
Born in Vienna, Land moved to Argentina in the 1930s and began as a film editor, editing for some 20 films in the 1940s. However, by the early 1950s he became interested in directing and directed a number of popular Argentine films in the 1950s such as the 1955 film Adiós problemas starring Enrique Muiño and the 1957 picture Alfonsina which starred actress Amelia Bence. He also worked regularly with the Argentine actress Olga Zubarry.

He directed his last film in 1970 in Buenos Aires. He died in New York City in 1997.

== Selected filmography ==
=== Editor ===
- Madame Bovary (1947)
- The Abyss Opens (1945)
- Stella (1943) Credited as Kurt Land.
- La casta Susana (1944) Credited as Kurt Land.
- Villa Rica del Espíritu Santo (1945) Credited as Kurt Land.
- Lauracha (1946) Credited as Kurt Land.

=== Producer ===
- Seven Women (1944)

=== Director ===
Amalia Sánchez Ariño and Enrique Muiño on set of Adiós problemas in 1955

- Hoy canto para ti (1950)
- ¡Qué hermanita! (1951)
- Vuelva el primero (1952)
- Como yo no hay dos (1952)
- Asunto terminado (1953)
- Mercado negro (1953)
- La telaraña (1954)
- Los problemas de papá (1954)
- Adiós problemas (1955)
- La delatora (1955)
- Bacará (1955)
- Surcos en el mar (1956)
- Estrellas de Buenos Aires (1956)
- Alfonsina (1957)
- Dos basuras (1958)
- Evangelina (1959)
- El asalto (1960)
- La Culpa (1969)
- El sátiro (1970)
- El hombre del año (1970)
