= Hilda Rey =

Argentine actress

Hilda Rey was an Argentine actress. She starred in the 1950 film Arroz con leche under director Carlos Schlieper.

== Selected filmography ==
- The Orchid (1951)
- The Lady of the Camellias (1953)
