= Nélida Romero =

Argentine actress

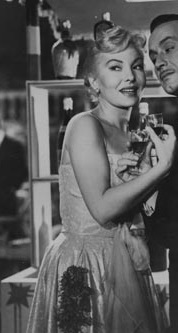
- Nélida Romero in 1951
- Born: January 17, 1926
- Died: January 14, 2015 (aged 88)

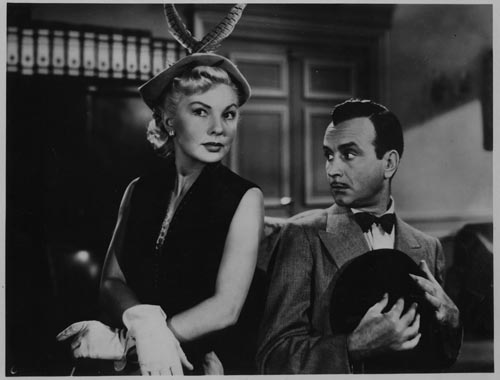

Nélida Romero (January 17, 1926 – January 14, 2015) was an Argentine actress. She starred in the 1950 film Arroz con leche under director Carlos Schlieper, who was her husband from 1944 to 1957.

== Filmography ==
- Who is killing the sparrows? (2000)
- Spoiled brat (short - 1993)
- The virgin Gaucho (1987)
- A cage has no secrets (1962)
- Christmas in June (1960)
- The bells of Teresa (1957)
- Alejandra (1956)
- My husband and my boyfriend (1955)
- Requiebro (1955)
- Eyes full of love (1954)
- Clown (1952)
- The Honourable Tenant (1951) ... Elena
- Things Women (1951)
- The heroic Bonifacio (1951)
- What little sister (1951)
- Rice Pudding (1950)
- Breach of trust (1950)
- Latest Model Wife (1950)
- When my husband kisses (1950)
- Meet at the stars (1949)
- Madame Bovary (1947) ... Artemis
- The Portrait (1947)
- The Three Rats (1946) ... Dressmaker

== Television ==
- The poor Clara (1984) (series) ... Emilia
- 24 Hours (1981) (series)
- A Light in the City (1971) (series) ... Susan
- A life to love you (1970) (series) Fina ...
- When given you by the Comte? (1966) (movie)
