= Amalia Sánchez Ariño =

Spanish-born Argentine stage and film actress

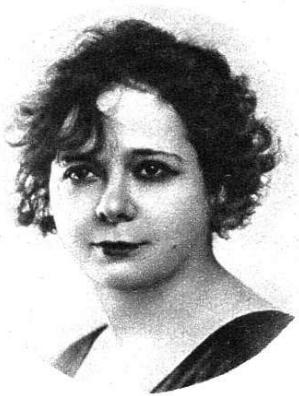
- Amalia Sánchez Ariño in the 1920s
- Born: 1883; Spain
- Died: 1969 (aged 85–86); Buenos Aires, Argentina
- Occupation: Actress
- Years active: 1934–1968 (film)

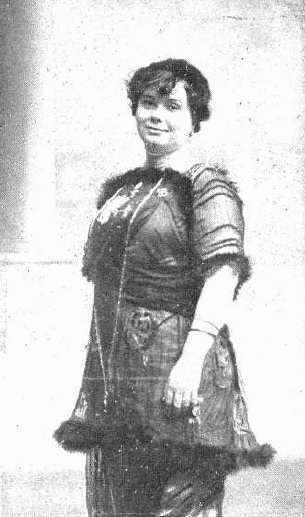
Amalia Sánchez Ariño in 1914

Amalia Sánchez Ariño (1883–1969) was a Spanish-born Argentine stage and film actress. She appeared in more than fifty films during her career.

== Selected filmography ==
- The Wicked Carabel (1935)
- Blood Wedding (1938)
- The Three Rats (1946)
- The Gambler (1947)
- Story of a Bad Woman (1948)
- The Goddess of Rio Beni (1950)
- Nacha Regules (1950)
- The Honourable Tenant (1951)
- Honour Your Mother (1951)
- Return to the Truth (1956)
- Juan Simón's Daughter (1957)
- Listen To My Song (1959)
- Alfonso XII and María Cristina (1960)

== Bibliography ==
- Richard, Alfred. Censorship and Hollywood's Hispanic image: an interpretive filmography, 1936-1955. Greenwood Press, 1993.
