= Ariel Cortazzo =

Argentine screenwriter

- Born: 1915; Buenos Aires, Argentina
- Died: February 1998 (aged 82–83); Buenos, Aires Argentina
- Occupation: Screenwriter
- Years active: 1940-1984 (film)

Ariel Cortazzo (1915 – February 1998) was an Argentine screenwriter.

== Selected filmography ==
- The Tango Star (1940)
- Girls Orchestra (1941)
- Melodies of America (1941)
- The Three Rats (1946)
- María Rosa (1946)
- Story of a Bad Woman (1948)
- The Honourable Tenant (1951)
- End of the Month (1953)
- Spring of Life (1957)
- Arm in Arm Down the Street (1966)

== Bibliography ==
- Cowie, Peter. World Filmography. Tantivy Press, 1968.
