= Carlos Schlieper =

Argentine film director and screenwriter

- Born: September 23, 1902; Buenos Aires, Argentina
- Died: April 11, 1957 (aged 54); Buenos Aires, Argentina
- Occupation: Actor
- Years active: 1939-1957

Carlos Schlieper (23 September 1902 – 11 April 1957 in Buenos Aires) was an Argentine film director and screenwriter notable for his work during the classical era of Argentine cinema.

His father, Hermann Heinrich Schlieper Feldmann (1842–1925), was an industrialist of German nationality and his mother, very Catholic, was Spaniard (from Andalusia). Schlieper, who had three male and three female siblings, received a careful education that included traveling abroad and studying at a high school in Switzerland.

He directed about 30 films between 1939 and 1957, writing for over 20 of them. He was particularly noted for his romantic comedies in the 1940s and 1950s, directing films such as La serpiente de cascabel (1948), Arroz con leche (1950), Cuando besa mi marido (1950), Mi mujer está loca (1952) and Mi marido y mi novio (1955). He also directed Alejandra in 1956 and died on 11 April 1957.

== Filmography ==
Director

- Cuatro corazones (1939)
- Si yo fuera rica (1941)
- Papá tiene novia (1941)
- Bruma en el Riachuelo (1942)
- Mañana me suicido (1942)
- El sillón y la gran duquesa (1943)
- El deseo (1944)
- The House is Empty (1945) (Chile)
- La honra de los hombres (1946)
- The Three Rats (1946)
- Pecadora (1947) (Mexico)
- Madame Bovary (1947)
- El misterioso tío Silas (1947)
- El retrato (1947)
- La serpiente de cascabel (1948)
- Por ellos... todo (1948)
- Cita en las estrellas (1949)
- Fascinación (1949)
- Cuando besa mi marido (1950)
- Esposa último modelo (1950)
- Arroz con leche (1950)
- Cosas de mujer (1951)
- Los árboles mueren de pie (1951)
- The Honourable Tenant (1951)
- Mi mujer está loca (1952)
- Los ojos llenos de amor (1954)
- Detective (1954)
- Mi marido y mi novio (1955)
- Requiebro (1955)
- Alejandra (1956)
- Las campanas de Teresa (1957)
  - Screenwriter:
- El más infeliz del pueblo (1941)
- Papá tiene novia (1941)
- Bruma en el Riachuelo (1942)
- El sillón y la gran duquesa (1943)
- Cuando besa mi marido (1950)
- Esposa último modelo (1950)
- Arroz con leche (1950)
- Cosas de mujer (1951)
- The Honourable Tenant (1951)
- Mi mujer está loca (1952)
- Vuelva el primero! (1952)
- Mi marido y mi novio (1955)
- Alejandra (1956)
- Las campanas de Teresa (1957)
