= List of Argentine films of 1954 =

A list of films produced in Argentina in 1954:

Argentine films of 1954
Title	Director	Release	Genre
A - C
El abuelo	Román Viñoly Barreto	2 July	Drama
Barrio gris	Mario Soffici	28 October	
Caídos en el infierno	Luis César Amadori	20 August	
El Calavera	Carlos Borcosque	31 August	
La calle del pecado	Ernesto Arancibia	8 April	
Canción de la nieve	Guzzi Lantschner	3 June	
El cartero	Homero Cárpena	21 January	
Casada y señorita	Carlos Rinaldi	22 April	
Confession at Dawn	Pierre Chenal	20 May	Drama
Cómicos	Juan Antonio Bardem	17 May	Drama
Corazón fiel	Leopoldo Torres Ríos	25 March	
Crisol de hombres	Arturo Gemmiti	8 July	
La cueva de Alí Babá	Mario C. Lugones	25 November	
El cura Lorenzo	Augusto César Vatteone	28 July	Drama
D - H
La Dama del mar	Mario Soffici	27 January	
Desalmados en pena	Leo Fleider	27 January	
Detective	Carlos Schlieper	29 September	
Días de odio	Leopoldo Torre Nilsson	3 June	drama
El domador	Adelqui Millar	30 June	
Dringue, Castrito y la lámpara de Aladino	Luis José Moglia Barth	18 February	Comedy
La edad del amor	Julio Saraceni	29 January	
El grito sagrado	Luis César Amadori	24 May	History
Guacho	Lucas Demare	7 July	drama
Un hombre cualquiera	Carlos Rinaldi	7 July	
Horas marcadas	Alberto Du Bois	4 May	
I - R
Maleficio	León Klimovsky, Florián Rey and Fernando de Fuentes	15 July	
María Magdalena	Carlos Hugo Christensen	6 April	
Misión en Buenos Aires	Ricardo Gascón	2 December	
Mi viudo y yo	Enrique Cahen Salaberry	22 September	
Muerte civil	Alberto D'Aversa	24 August	
Mujeres casadas	Mario Soffici	12 April	
Los ojos llenos de amor	Carlos Schlieper	2 July	
Los problemas de Papá	Kurt Land	9 February	
Río Turbio	Alejandro Wehner	9 December	
Ritmo, amor y picardía	Enrique Carreras		
Romeo y Julita	Enrique Carreras	16 March	
S - Z
Sábado del pecado	Belisario García Villar	unreleased	
Se necesita un hombre con cara de infeliz	Homero Cárpena	28 October	
Siete gritos en el mar	Enrique Carreras	7 July	
Somos todos inquilinos	Carlos Torres Ríos, Juan Carlos Thorry and Enrique Carreras	24 May	
Sucedió en Buenos Aires	Enrique Cahen Salaberry	18 May	
Su seguro servidor	Edgardo Togni	9 September	
La telaraña	Kurt Land	30 September	
Torrente indiano	Bernardo Spoliansky and Leo Fleider	28 January	
Tren internacional	Daniel Tinayre	3 November	
El último cow-boy	Juan Sires	25 February	
Veraneo en Mar del Plata	Julio Saraceni	2 September	
Yo soy el criminal	Alberto Du Bois	29 July	

== External links and references ==
- Argentine films of 1954 at the Internet Movie Database
