= List of Argentine films of 1949 =

A list of films produced in Argentina in 1949:

Argentine films of 1949
Title	Director	Release	Genre
A - C
Alma de bohemio	Julio Saraceni	24 August	musical, comedy
Almafuerte	Luis César Amadori	20 December	History
Ángeles de uniforme	René Olivares	unreleased	
Apenas un delincuente	Hugo Fregonese	22 March	drama
Las aventuras de Jack	Carlos Borcosque	31 March	drama
Avivato	Enrique Cahen Salaberry	1 September	comedy
Cita en las estrellas	Carlos Schlieper	13 January	comedy
Con los mismos colores	Carlos Torres Ríos	20 September	deportiva
Corrientes, calle de ensueños	Manuel Romero	29 September	drama
La cuna vacía	Carlos Rinaldi	23 May	drama
D - F
Danza del fuego	Daniel Tinayre	27 December	musical
De hombre a hombre	Hugo Fregonese	7 July	policial
De padre desconocido	Alberto de Zavalía	25 May	drama
Diez segundos	Alejandro Wehner	23 November	deportiva
La Doctora quiere tangos	Alberto de Zavalía	20 July	musical, comedy
Don Juan Tenorio	Luis César Amadori	17 February	
Edición extra	Luis José Moglia Barth	26 October	drama
Esperanza	Francisco Mugica and Eduardo Boneo	11 October	History
El extraño caso de la mujer asesinada	Boris H. Hardy	27 July	
Fascinación	Carlos Schlieper	27 September	comedy
Fúlmine	Luis Bayón Herrera	2 February	comedy
G - O
El hijo de la calle	Leopoldo Torres Ríos	24 February	Drama
La historia del tango	Manuel Romero	29 June	musical
El hombre de las sorpresas	Leopoldo Torres Ríos	5 October	
El ídolo del tango	Héctor Canziani	17 March	
Imitaciones peligrosas	Julio C. Rossi	7 October	Comedy
Juan Globo	Luis César Amadori	28 April	comedy
Miguitas en la cama	Mario C. Lugones	17 November	comedy
Morir en su ley	Manuel Romero	29 September	policial
Mujeres que bailan	Manuel Romero	12 May	drama
Nace la libertad	Julio Saraceni	7 July	
El nieto de Congreve	Leopoldo Torres Ríos	7 December	
Otra cosa es con guitarra	Antonio Ber Ciani	15 June	Musical
La otra y yo	Antonio Momplet	28 January	
P - Z
Pantalones cortos	Leopoldo Torres Ríos	22 June	drama
¿Por qué mintió la cigüeña?	Carlos Hugo Christensen	6 January	comedy
Se llamaba Carlos Gardel	León Klimovsky	7 April	musical
A Story of the Nineties	Hugo del Carril	19 May	musical, drama
Su última pelea	Jerry Gómez	8 June	
La tierra será nuestra	Ignacio Tankel	28 July	
Todo un héroe	Luis Bayón Herrera	20 April	
La trampa	Carlos Hugo Christensen	11 August	
Una noche en el Ta Ba Rin	Luis César Amadori	3 May	comedy
Un Hombre solo no vale nada	Mario C. Lugones	24 March	
Un pecado por mes	Mario C. Lugones	18 May	
Un tropezón cualquiera da en la vida	Manuel Romero	20 January	drama, musical
Vidalita	Luis Saslavsky	17 June	
Yo no elegí mi vida	Antonio Momplet	14 June	

== External links and references ==
- Argentine films of 1949 at the Internet Movie Database
