= List of Argentine films of 1953 =

A list of films produced in Argentina in 1953:

Argentine films of 1953
Title	Director	Release	Genre
A - E
Acorralada	Julio C. Rossi	9 April	
Asunto terminado	Kurt Land	21 August	
Black Ermine	Carlos Hugo Christensen	27 August	
The Black Market	Kurt Land	25 June	
Caballito criollo	Ralph Pappier	26 November	
La casa grande	Leo Fleider	1 January	
El Conde de Montecristo	León Klimovsky	27 March	
Del otro lado del puente	Carlos Rinaldi	8 July	
Dock Sud	Tulio Demicheli	21 May	
Ellos nos hicieron así	Mario Soffici	23 February	
En cuerpo y alma	Leopoldo Torres Ríos	19 March	
End of the Month	Enrique Cahen Salaberry	22 January	Comedy
F - M
El hijo del crack	Leopoldo Torres Ríos and Leopoldo Torre Nilsson	15 December	Drama
Honrarás a tu madre	Alberto D'Aversa	18 June	
Intermezzo criminal	Luis José Moglia Barth	5 June	
The Lady of the Camellias	Ernesto Arancibia	5 February	
La mano que aprieta	Enrique Carreras	21 January	
Mansedumbre	Pedro R. Bravo	22 January	
La mejor del colegio	Julio Saraceni	18 June	
El muerto es un vivo	Yago Blass	6 February	
N - S
La niña del gato	Román Viñoly Barreto	23 April	
Paradise	Karl Ritter	5 February	Drama
La pasión desnuda	Luis César Amadori	27 April	
El Pecado más lindo del mundo	Don Napy	2 December	
Por cuatro días locos	Julio Saraceni	30 July	
¡Qué noche de casamiento!	Enrique Carreras	10 November	
Rebelión en los llanos	Belisario García Villar	17 December	
Stella Maris	Homero Cárpena	21 January	
Suegra último modelo	Enrique Carreras	26 August	
T - Z
La tía de Carlitos	Enrique Carreras	12 March	
Las tres claves	Adalberto Páez Arenas	15 October	
Los tres mosquiteros	Enrique Carreras	7 July	
Trompada 45	Leo Fleider	11 August	
Los troperos	Juan Sires	23 April	
Uéi Paesano	Manuel Romero	15 June	Musical
Un ángel sin pudor	Carlos Hugo Christensen	10 March	
Una Ventana a la vida	Mario Soffici	20 August	
El vampiro negro	Román Viñoly Barreto	14 October	
La voz de mi ciudad	Tulio Demicheli	15 January	

== External links and references ==
- Argentine films of 1953 at the Internet Movie Database
