= List of Argentine films of 1952 =

A list of films produced in Argentina in 1952:

Argentine films of 1952
Title	Director	Release	Genre
A - F
Las aguas bajan turbias	Hugo del Carril	9 October	
El baldío	Carlos Rinaldi	13 June	
Bárbara atómica	Julio Saraceni	23 May	
La bestia debe morir	Román Viñoly Barreto	8 May	
Como yo no hay dos	Kurt Land	24 July	
Deshonra	Daniel Tinayre	3 June	
Donde comienzan los pantanos	Antonio Ber Ciani	23 July	
Ellos nos hicieron así	Mario Soffici		
La encrucijada	Leopoldo Torres Ríos	31 January	
Ésta es mi vida	Román Viñoly Barreto	17 July	
Evita inmortal	Luis César Amadori		Documentary
Facundo, el tigre de los llanos	Miguel P. Tato	3 July	
G - N
El gaucho y el diablo	Ernesto Remani	3 November	
The Idol	Pierre Chenal	18 November	
El infortunado Fortunato	Enrique Cahen Salaberry	21 October	
La de los ojos color del tiempo	Luis César Amadori	21 August	
Mala gente	Don Napy	19 March	
La melodía perdida	Tulio Demicheli	28 August	
Mi hermano Esopo (Historia de un Mateo)	Luis Mottura	17 January	
Marido de ocasión	Adelqui Millar	15 October	
Mi mujer está loca	Carlos Schlieper and Enrique Cahen Salaberry		
Mi noche triste	Lucas Demare	3 January	
Nace un campeón	Roberto Ratti	17 April	
La niña de fuego	Carlos Torres Ríos	11 September	
No abras nunca esa puerta	Carlos Hugo Christensen	23 May	
O - Z
Paraíso robado	José Arturo Pimentel	13 March	
La Parda Flora	León Klimovsky	11 July	
Payaso	Lucas Demare	29 April	
La patrulla chiflada	Carlos Rinaldi	17 June	
¡Qué rico el mambo!	Mario C. Lugones	21 February	
Rescate de sangre	Francisco Mugica	16 September	
Sala de guardia	Tulio Demicheli	28 February	
Si muero antes de despertar	Carlos Hugo Christensen	29 April	
Los sobrinos del zorro	Leo Fleider	14 February	
The Tunnel	León Klimovsky	1 April	
Vigilantes y ladrones	Carlos Rinaldi	23 October	
Vuelva el primero!	Kurt Land	24 April	
Y la Argentina detuvo su corazón	Edward Cronjagar		Documentary
Las zapatillas coloradas	Juan Sires and Enrique Carreras	29 May	

== External links and references ==
- Argentine films of 1952 at the Internet Movie Database
