= List of Argentine films of 1947 =

A list of films produced in Argentina in 1947:

Argentine films of 1947
Title	Director	Release	Genre
A - C
Albéniz	Luis César Amadori	4 February	
A Sangre Fría	Daniel Tinayre	6 June	
Los averiados	Mario Montanaro	3 January	
Buenos Aires Sings	Antonio Solano	3 June	
Como tú lo soñaste	Lucas Demare	14 August	
Con el diablo en el cuerpo	Carlos Hugo Christensen	21 May	
La copla de la Dolores	Benito Perojo	10 September	
Corazón	Carlos Borcosque	30 January	
Cumbres de hidalguía	Julio Saraceni	1 July	
La cumparsita	Antonio Momplet	20 April	musical
D - L
El que recibe las bofetadas	Boris H. Hardy	2 July	
Estrellita	Román Viñoly Barreto	17 December	
Evasión	Ignacio Domínguez Riera	13 November	
The Gambler	León Klimovsky	22 October	
La gata	Mario Soffici	17 June	
Los Hijos del otro	Catrano Catrani	5 March	
El hombre del sábado	Leopoldo Torres Ríos	9 September	
El hombre que amé	Alberto de Zavalía	11 September	
An Ideal Husband	Luis Bayón Herrera	7 February	
Lucrezia Borgia	Luis Bayón Herrera	29 August	
M - R
Madame Bovary	Carlos Schlieper	2 April	
Mirad los lirios del campo	Ernesto Arancibia	25 December	
El misterio del cuarto amarillo	Julio Saraceni	16 April	
El misterioso tío Silas	Carlos Schlieper	7 May	
Navidad de los pobres	Manuel Romero	12 August	
Nunca te diré adiós	Lucas Demare	29 April	
El pecado de Julia	Mario Soffici	5 June	
El precio de una vida	Adelqui Millar	23 October	
El retrato	Carlos Schlieper	19 June	
Romance musical	Ernesto Arancibia	22 January	
S - Z
Santos Vega vuelve	Leopoldo Torres Ríos	16 April	
La senda oscura	Luis José Moglia Barth	9 May	
Siete para un secreto	Carlos Borcosque	15 November	
La sombra del pasado	Ignacio Tankel	25 May	
Treinta segundos de amor	Luis Mottura	13 February	
Una mujer sin cabeza	Luis César Amadori	4 April	Horror
Un ángel sin pantalones	Enrique Cahen Salaberry	29 July	
Vacaciones	Luis Mottura	25 September	
27 millones	José Bohr	8 May	
Los verdes paraísos	Carlos Hugo Christensen	22 August	

== External links and references ==
- Argentine films of 1947 at the Internet Movie Database
