= Raúl del Valle =

Chilean-Argentinian actor (1908–1973)

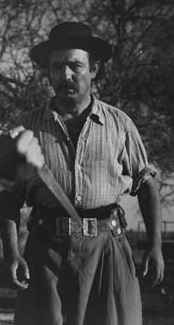
- Born: 1908; Chile
- Died: 21 January 1973 (aged 64–65); La Rioja, Argentina

Raúl del Valle (1908 in Chile – 21 January 1973, in La Rioja, Argentina) was a Chilean film and theatre actor who performed for most of his career in Argentina.

== Career ==
Del Valle was a prominent character actor who performed in more than 40 Argentine films and worked with well-known actors such as Hugo del Carril, Dora Baret, Libertad Leblanc, and Armando Bo among others.

== Death ==
Del Valle died of myocardial infarction whilst shooting the film La muerte de Sebastián Arache y su pobre entierro (The Death of Sebastián Arache and his poor burial). He death was shot on camera. He was 64 years old on the day of his death.

== Filmography ==
=== 1940s ===
- 1941: El cantar de mis penas
- 1942: En el viejo Buenos Aires
- 1946: Inspiración
- 1947: El precio de una vida (Played Boroff)
- 1948: Rodríguez, supernumerario
- 1948: Tierra del fuego
- 1949: Con el sudor de tu frente
- 1949: Ángeles de uniforme
- 1949: Se llamaba Carlos Gardel
- 1949: Diez segundos

=== 1950s ===
- 1950: La barca sin pescador
- 1950: Arrabalera
- 1951: El pendiente
- 1951: La calle junto a la luna
- 1952: Nace un campeón
- 1952: El gaucho y el diablo
- 1952: El infierno verde
- 1952: Las aguas bajan turbias
- 1954: Sin familia
- 1954: Días de odio (Played The Sailor)
- 1954: La tigra (Played Olivera)
- 1954: Llampo de sangre
- 1955: Embrujo en Cerros Blancos
- 1956: Después del silencio
- 1957: El hombre señalado
- 1958: El festín de Satanás
- 1958: Hombres salvajes
- 1958: Sin familia
- 1959: Cavalcade
- 1959: Cerro Guanaco
- 1959: Las tierras blancas

=== 1960s ===
- 1960: Shunko
- 1961: Alias Gardelito
- 1961: Esta tierra es mía
- 1962: Reencuentro con la gloria
- 1963: Testigo para un crimen
- 1963: El último montonero
- 1964: Así o de otra manera
- 1965: Esquiú, una luz en el sendero
- 1966: Fuego en la sangre
- 1966: Los días calientes
- 1966: La cómplice
- 1969: Eloy (Played Hernández)
- 1969: Desnuda en la arena

=== 1970s ===
- 1970: Una cabaña en la pampa
- 1972: Intimidades de una cualquiera
- 1973: Paño verde
- 1973: Si se calla el cantor
- 1974: La muerte de Sebastián Arache y su pobre entierro
