= Pantalones cortos =

- Directed by: Leopoldo Torres Ríos
- Written by: Leopoldo Torres Ríos; Leopoldo Torre Nilsson
- Produced by: Establecimientos Filmadores Argentinos
- Starring: Toscanito; Pierina Dealessi; María Concepción César; Guillermo Pedemonte; Juan Ricardo Bertelegni
- Music by: Alejandro Gutiérrez del Barrio
- Release date: 22 June 1949
- Running time: 84 minutes
- Country: Argentina
- Language: Spanish

Pantalones cortos (English: Short pants) is a 1949 Argentine film of the classical era of Argentine cinema, directed by Leopoldo Torres Ríos and written by him and Leopoldo Torre Nilsson. It was premiered on June 22, 1949.

== Cast ==
- Toscanito …Eduardito
- Pierina Dealessi
- María Concepción César
- Guillermo Pedemonte
- Juan Ricardo Bertelegni
- Rodolfo Zenner
- Mario Baroffio
- Juan Pérez Bilbao
- Jaime Andrada
- Ermete Meliante
- Dante Albarelli
- Margarita Canale
- Arturo Arcari
- Narciso Ibáñez
- Andrés Vázquez
- Betty Denis
- Mary Nelly
- Juan Massey
- Adolfo Demaría
- Agustín Andrades
