= Cuidado Con Las Mujeres =

- Directed by: Enrique Cahen Salaberry
- Written by: Ariel Cortazzo; André Revesz
- Produced by: Carlos Gallart
- Starring: Alberto Closas; Analía Gadé; Nelly Meden
- Cinematography: Roque Giaccovino
- Edited by: Oscar Carchano
- Music by: Víctor Slister
- Distributed by: E.I.A.
- Release date: 1951
- Running time: 70 minutes
- Country: Argentina
- Language: Spanish

Cuidado con las mujeres [lit. Be careful with women, in Spanish] is a 1951 Argentine comedy film of the classical era of Argentine cinema, directed by Enrique Cahen Salaberry and screen-written by Ariel Cortazzo based on a play by André Revesz. The film starred Otto Sirgo.

== Cast ==
- Alberto Closas
- Analía Gadé
- Nelly Meden
- Otto Sirgo
- Héctor Calcaño
- Julián Bourges
- Miguel Ligero
- José Comellas
- Mario Baroffio
- Ángel Eleta
- María Esther Podestá
- Amalia Bernabé
- Pedro Pompillo
- Max Citelli
- Nelly Lainez

== Reception ==
El Heraldo del Cinematografista found it was "a lively and friendly comedy that offered light entertainment" while Manrupe and Portela wrote it was a passable comedy.

According to a contemporary review, the film did not manage to "overcome its bland plot and the spectators must confess, in all honesty, that they unforgivably wasted the twenty pesos of the entrance fee."
