= That Forward Center Died at Dawn =

1961 film

- Directed by: René Mugica
- Written by: Agustín Cuzzani; Agustín Cuzzani (play)
- Starring: Arturo Arcari
- Cinematography: Ricardo Younis
- Edited by: Atilio Rinaldi
- Release date: 22 June 1961
- Running time: 80 minutes
- Country: Argentina
- Language: Spanish

That Forward Center Died at Dawn (Spanish: El centroforward murió al amanecer) is a 1961 Argentine drama film, adapted by Agustín Cuzzani from his play of the same name. It was directed by René Mugica and was entered into the 1961 Cannes Film Festival.

== Plot ==
"Cacho" Garibaldi, skillful soccer player, is bought by a millionaire named Lupus and in a stormy night moves to his mansion: a combination of palace, fortress and prison. There he learns that Lupus is a collector of exceptional human beings and that the player is not allowed to leave or play football ever again.

Cacho falls in love with another prisoner, a dancer, and they try to escape. They fail and Cacho ends up killing Lupus and getting shot by the guards.

== Cast ==
- Arturo Arcari
- Didi Carli
- Camilo Da Passano
- Pierina Dealessi
- Francisco Pablo Donadio
- Enrique Fava
- Félix Daniel Frascara
- Lalo Hartich
- Roberto Maidana
- Víctor Martucci
- Luis Medina Castro: Cacho Garibaldi
- Javier Portales
- Raúl Rossi: Lupus
- Eduardo Vargas

== Reception ==
The film was described as "an incisive chronicle of the sports world".

In Angels With Dirty Faces, Jonathan Wilson wrote: "It is a strange, partially allegorical work that features a millionaire who buys artists and scientists in order to breed them and better the species."

== Legacy ==
The presentation of a screening at the Museum of Latino-American of Buenos Aires stated: "The libertarian spirit of Agustín Cuzzani's work, surrealist in the Creole style, was transferred to the cinema in an exemplary way by Mugica". The same source states it is the director's masterpiece.
