= Alberto Vaccarezza =

Argentine writer (1888–1959)

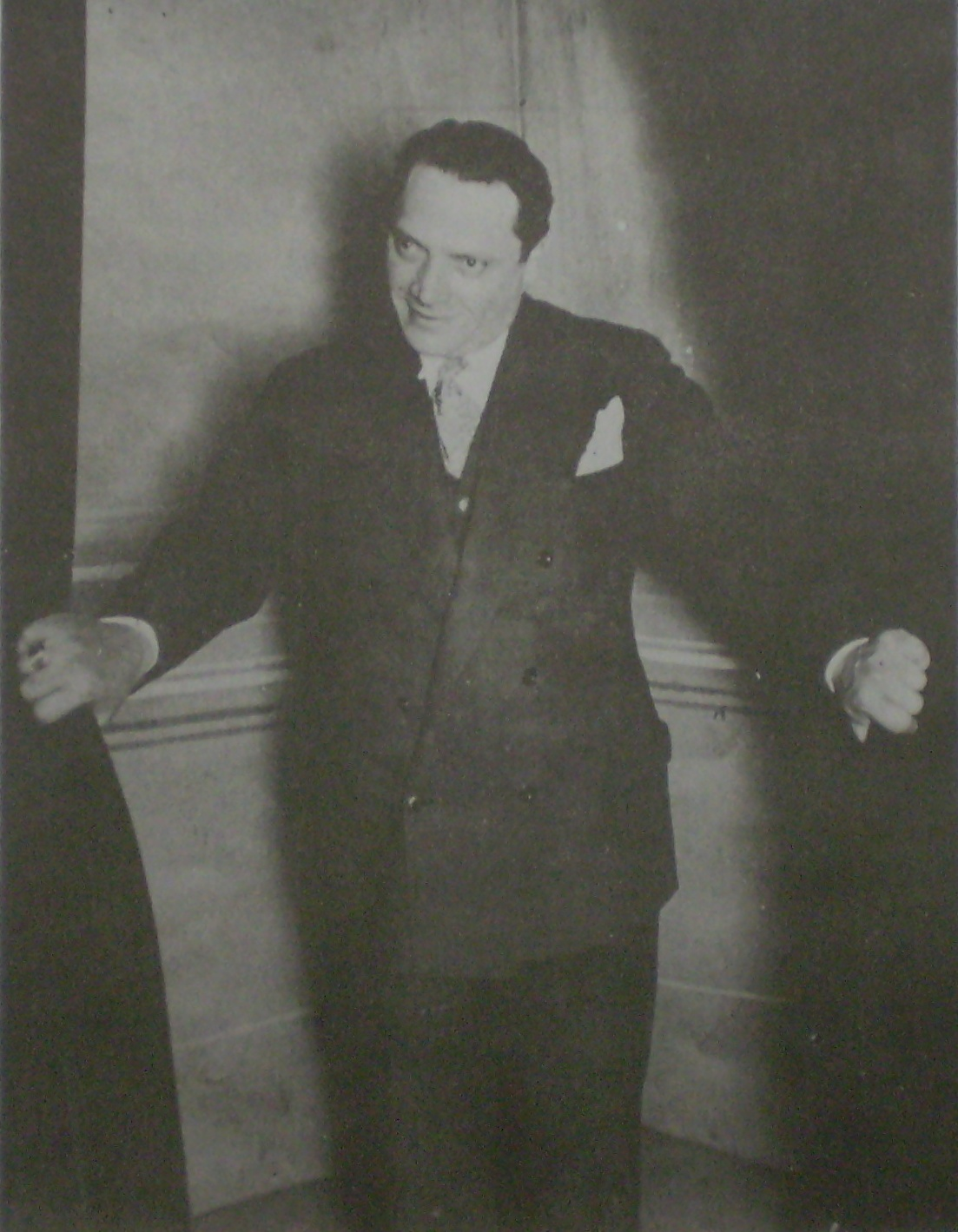
Alberto Vaccarezza.

Bartolomé Ángel Venancio Alberto Vaccarezza (1886–1959) was an Argentine poet and playwright.

== Biography ==
Vaccarezza was born in Buenos Aires on April 1, 1886. He is usually credited as the foremost exponent of the sainete genre, having written its most popular play, El Conventillo de La Paloma (The La Paloma Tenement). He was a friend and collaborator of Carlos Gardel, and pronounced his eulogy when Gardel was interred at La Chacarita Cemetery.

Besides his literary activities, he presided over Argentores (the national playwright guild) and Casa del Teatro (House of Theater, a beneficent organization that hosts impoverished retired actors).

He died in Buenos Aires, on August 6, 1959.

== Works ==
=== Sainete ===
- Cuando un pobre se divierte
- El conventillo de La Paloma
- Tu cuna fue un conventillo
- La comparsa se despide (1932)
- Los scruchantes (1911)
- El juzgado (1903, his first play)

=== Poetry - Tango Lyrics ===
- La copa del olvido
- Araca, corazón
- Otario que andás penando
- Eche otra copa pulpero
- No me tires con la tapa de la olla
- Pobre gringo
- Virgencita del Talar

=== Film Scripts ===
- El conventillo de La Paloma (1936)
- Lo que le pasó a Reynoso (1937 y 1955)
- Viento norte (1937)
- Murió el sargento Laprida (1937)
- El cabo Rivero (1938)
- Pampa y cielo (1938)
- El comisario de Tranco Largo (1942)
- Sendas cruzadas (1942)
