= Bruno Corra =

Italian writer and screenwriter

- Born: Bruno Ginanni Corradini; 9 June 1892; Ravenna, Italy
- Died: 20 November 1976 (aged 84); Varese, Italy
- Occupations: Writer, screenwriter

Bruno Corra was the pseudonym of Bruno Ginanni Corradini (9 June 1892 – 20 November 1976), an Italian writer and screenwriter.

== Career ==
The son of Count Tullio Ginanni Corradini (who was also mayor of Ravenna) and brother of Arnaldo Ginna (the names Corra and Ginna were suggested by Giacomo Balla by assonance with the words running and gymnastics), he spent his childhood and most of his youth in his hometown, combining regular studies with various eclectic readings, taking an interest in all knowledge, from literature to art, from philosophy to theosophy.

At the end of 1912, he founded with Mario Carli and Emilio Settimelli the magazine The Centaur, which aimed at the expression of a non-dogmatic conception of art. In 1916, he participated in the making of the film Futurist Life, in collaboration with Balla and Marinetti, a film produced and directed by Ginna (now for this film, there are only a few frames).

In 1915, he published the novel Sam Dunn is dead, (Sam Dunn è Morto). He left Futurism a few years after the end of the First World War, publishing novels and escapist comedies that got a decent success with the public, such as The Island of Kisses of 1918, written in cooperation with Marinetti, or The Passatore of 1929 (on Stefano Pelloni).

== Filmography ==
- We invent love (1938)
- Crossing Black (1939)
- The miracle well (1949)
- El hombre de las sorpresas (1949)
- Deception (1952)

== Bibliography ==
- Sam Dunn is Dead
