= Delfy de Ortega =

Argentine actress

Delfy de Ortega (21 August 1920, Turin – 21 September 1995, General Rodríguez Partido) was an Italian-born Argentine actress.

== Filmography ==
- Sin querer, queriendo (1985)
- Yo también tengo fiaca (1978)
- El divorcio está de moda (de común acuerdo) (1978)
- Rebeldía (1975)
- Hipólito y Evita (1973)
- Nino (1972)
- El mundo es de los jóvenes (1970)
- Rebeldía (1969)
- Sábado del pecado (not commercially released – 1954)
- Un ángel sin pudor (1953)
- El infortunado Fortunato (1952)
- Paraíso robado (1952)
- The Beautiful Brummel (1951)
- Al Compás de tu Mentira (1950)
- Diez segundos (1949)
- Todo un héroe (1949)
- Evasión (1947)
- Santos Vega Returns (1947)
- Tres millones... y el amor (1946)
- Un modelo de París (1946)
- Chiruca (1945)
- Santa Cándida (1945)
- Madame Sans-Gêne (1945)
- El deseo (1944)
- Educating Niní (1940)
- La cieguita de la avenida Alvear (1939)
