= Stolen Paradise =

Stolen Paradise may refer to:

- Stolen Paradise (1940 film), a youth film
- Stolen Paradise (1952 film), an Argentine film
- Stolen Paradise (1951 film), a Mexican drama film
- The Stolen Paradise, a 1917 American silent drama film
