= Romeo and Juliet (1954 Argentine film) =

1953 film by Enrique Carreras

Romeo y Julita
- Film poster
- Directed by: Enrique Carreras
- Written by: Miguel de Calasanz
- Based on: Romeo and Juliet; 1597 play by William Shakespeare
- Starring: Alfredo Barbieri; Amelia Vargas; Esteban Serrador
- Cinematography: Roque Funes
- Edited by: José Gallego
- Music by: Vlady
- Release date: March 16, 1954
- Running time: 76 minutes
- Country: Argentina
- Language: Spanish

Romeo and Juliet (Spanish: Romeo y Julita) is a 1954 Argentine film directed by Enrique Carreras during the classical era of Argentine cinema. The screenplay was written by Rafael Beltrán, based on the plot by Miguel de Calasanz. It stars Alfredo Barbieri, Amelia Vargas, Esteban Serrador and Susana Campos and was released on March 16, 1954.

== Plot ==
An engaged couple rents an apartment that turns out to belong to someone else.

== Cast ==
- Alfredo Barbieri
- Amelia Vargas
- Esteban Serrador
- Susana Campos
- Tito Climent
- Guido Gorgatti
- Domingo Márquez
- Aída Villadeamigo
- Enrique Lomi
- Esmeralda Agoglia
- Leo Bélico
- Arsenio Perdiguero

== Reception ==
Noticias Gráficas opined: "An argument that rests on equivocation, but without adding any detail that differentiates it from the innumerable number of plays that frivolous theater counts in its copious credit." Raúl Manrupe and María Alejandra Portela in their book Un diccionario de films argentinos (1930–1995) write (translated from Spanish): "A simple comedy to take advantage of the success of the protagonist couple.".
