= Ivo Pelay =

Argentine playwright (1893–1959)

Ivo Pelay (May 5, 1893 – August 28, 1959) was one of Argentina's most prolific playwrights of the early 20th century.

== Biography ==
Born Guillermo Juan Robustiano Pichot in Buenos Aires, Pelay wrote over 200 plays in his lifetime, beginning with La Mala Vida in 1911. Perhaps his most famous work is his 1925 nationalist dramedy La canción de los barrios ("Song of the Streets"). In addition, a number of his plays documenting the political and economic woes of Argentina in the 1930s were very popular.

While most of his plays were satires or straight comedies, he wrote a number of popular local musicals, which helped popularize the tango style of music. In addition, he worked as a writer for radio, as a journalist, and as a director on a number of his plays. He also served as the chief manager of the Teatro Nacional, which showcased many of his plays.

Pelay was also a prolific lyricist, notably in the tango and milonga styles, with over 100 songs to his credit. His best-known works include Todo te Nombra, Soñar y nada mas and above all Se dice de me.

Pelay died in 1959 as one of the legends of Argentine theater. He was 66.

He is buried at La Chacarita Cemetery.

== Selected filmography ==
- Honeysuckle (1938)
- The Song of the Suburbs (1941)
- The New Bell (1950)

== See also ==
- Pichot
