= Estrellita =

Estrellita may refer to:

Person:

- Estrellita (wrestler)
- Estrellita Castro, Spanish singer and actress

In art and culture:

- Estrellita (film)
- Estrellita, a song by Manuel Ponce.
