= Aquello que Amamos =

1959 film

- Directed by: Leopoldo Torres Ríos
- Written by: Leopoldo Torres Ríos
- Produced by: Tito Benmuyal; Leopoldo Torres Ríos
- Cinematography: Oscar Melli
- Edited by: José Gallego
- Music by: Juan Ehlert; Leopoldo Torres Ríos
- Release date: 1959
- Running time: 71 minute
- Country: Argentina
- Language: Spanish

Aquello que amamos (English language:Those that We Loved) is a 1959 Argentine film directed and written by Leopoldo Torres Ríos. The film premiered on 20 August 1959 in Buenos Aires and starred Lautaro Murúa and Aída Luz.

== Other cast ==
- Ana Casares
- Luis María Galó as Luisito Nuñez
- Carlos Gómez as Osvaldo
- Roberto Leidet as Andrés Nuñez
- Pablo Moret
- Mario Morets
- Oscar Orlegui
- Lagos Osvaldo as Médico
- Sarita Rudoy as Adela
- María Elena Spaducci as Clarita Nuñez
