= The Crossroads (1952 film) =

- Directed by: Leopoldo Torres Ríos
- Written by: Noel Barona; Leopoldo Torres Ríos
- Starring: Mario Danesi; José Guisone; Gina Maria Hidalgo
- Cinematography: Gumer Barreiros
- Edited by: Rosalino Caterbeti
- Music by: Isidro B. Maiztegui
- Release date: 1952
- Running time: 72 minute
- Country: Argentina
- Language: Spanish

The Crossroads (Spanish: La Encrucijada) is a 1952 Argentine film directed by Leopoldo Torres Ríos during the classical era of Argentine cinema.

== Cast ==
- Mario Danesi
- José Guisone
- Gina Maria Hidalgo
- Juan Latrónico
- Claudio Lucero
- Diego Marcote
- Mario Pocoví
- Lydia Quintana
- Alberto Rinaldi
- Ricardo Trigo
