= María Esther Corán =

Argentine actress

- Born: 1910; Buenos Aires, Argentina
- Died: 1997; Buenos Aires, Argentina
- Occupation: Actress
- Years active: 1944-1976

María Esther Corán was an Argentine actress. She starred in films such Fúlmine (1949), El nieto de Congreve (1949), La melodía perdida (1952), Marta Ferrari (1956) and El ayudante (1971). One of her best known roles was in the 1961 TV series Viendo a Biondi, co-starring Pepe Biondi. In 1997, she was honored with the Día del Actor award for her 50-year career.

== Filmography ==
- Juan que reía (1976)
- Los chantas (1975) ...
- La gran aventura (1974)
- El ayudante (1971)
- P.K. en Buenos Aires (1968)
- Operación San Antonio (1968)
- Con el más puro amor (1966) (filmed in 1955)
- Una jaula no tiene secretos (1962)
- Libertad bajo palabra (1961) ...
- ...Y el demonio creó a los hombres (1960)
- Yo quiero vivir contigo (1960) ...Women on train
- Sábado a la noche, cine (1960)
- El secuestrador (1958)
- Cinco gallinas y el cielo (1957)
- Catita es una dama (1956) ...Doña Anunciata
- Marta Ferrari (1956)
- Mi marido y mi novio (1955)
- Sinfonía de juventud (1955)
- Torrente indiano (1954)
- Barrio gris (1954) ...Verdulera
- Su seguro servidor (1954)
- Veraneo en Mar del Plata (1954)
- La patrulla chiflada (1952)
- La melodía perdida (1952)
- Mi divina pobreza (1951)
- Cinco locos en la pista (1950)
- La barra de la esquina (1950) ...Doña Andrea
- Fúlmine (1949)
- El nieto de Congreve (1949) ...Rosaura
- Hombres a precio (1949)
- Mujeres que bailan (1949)
- La caraba (1948)
- Villa Rica del Espíritu Santo (1945)
- La importancia de ser ladrón (1944)
