= Anita Palmero =

Spanish singer

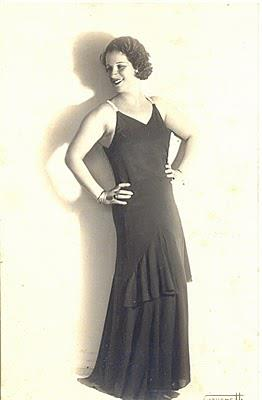
- Palmero in 1940
- Born: 1902; Ronda, Málaga, Spain
- Died: 1987 (aged 84); Buenos Aires, Argentina
- Occupations: Singer; Actress

Anita Palmero (13 September 1902 – 11 January 1987) was a Spanish cabaret and tango singer, as well as an actress. Nicknamed the "Cancionista nacional", she had a successful career in Argentina.

== Early life ==
She was born in Ronda, Málaga, Spain in 1902 and grew up there with her four sisters. Her father, Manuel Rojas Palmero, was a theater electrician, so from a very young age, she was in contact with the art world. Her mother died in 1917 so the family moved to Casablanca for economic reasons.

== Career ==
In 1925, she appeared at the Romea Theatre of Madrid before touring Mexico and Cuba. In 1929, she sang the song "Botarate" in Mosaico criollo, a film by Comminetti Edmo, which was the first tango sung in film.

== Death ==
She died in Buenos Aires, Argentina in 1987.

== Songs ==
- Botarate
- Sentencia gitana
- Bigotito
- Burrero seco
- Encantadora
- Ilusión marina
- Reza por mí
- Negrita, quiere café?
- El pasodoble
- El niño de las monjas
- Al mundo le falta varios tornillo
- Andate
- Fumando espero
- Piedad
- Marioneta
- Te acordás de aquella vidalita?
- Caperucita
- A La comadreja
- Hasta que ardan los candiles
- Levanté los ojos para ver el cielo
- Bajando la serranía
- A Escribile al comisario
- Churrasqueando
- El que con chicos se acuesta
- La mentirosa
- Te piantaste? Buena suerte!
- La carrera de sortija
- Viejo ciego
- Para qué vivir
- Naipe Marcado

== Filmography ==
- 1929: Mosaico criollo
- 1949: Fúlmine
- 1950: El ladrón canta boleros
- 1954: Misión en Buenos Aires
