= Lo que le pasó a Reynoso =

- Directed by: Leopoldo Torres Ríos
- Written by: Leopoldo Torres Ríos; Alberto Vaccarezza (play)
- Produced by: Julio Joly
- Starring: Floren Delbene
- Cinematography: Carlos Torres Ríos
- Music by: Eugenio De Briganti
- Release date: 18 February 1937
- Running time: 78 minute
- Country: Argentina
- Language: Spanish

Lo que le pasó a Reynoso is a 1937 Argentine drama film directed and written by Leopoldo Torres Ríos during the Golden Age of Argentine cinema. The film was based on a play by Alberto Vaccarezza and premiered in Buenos Aires on February 18, 1937. It starred Floren Delbene.

The film was produced by Julio Joly and the cinematography performed by Carlos Torres Ríos.

== Cast ==
- Luis Arata as Serapio
- Floren Delbene as Julián Reynoso
- Francisco Álvarez as Sargento Lucero
- Herminia Franco
- Maria Esther Duckse as Soña Hilaria
- Pedro Maratea
- Héctor Bonati
- Domingo Sapelli
- Teresa Serrador
