= La Estancia de gaucho Cruz =

1938 film

- Release date: 1938
- Country: Argentina
- Language: Spanish

La Estancia de gaucho Cruz is a 1938 Argentine comedy film directed by Leopoldo Torres Rios during the Golden Age of Argentine cinema. The film premiered in Buenos Aires.

== Cast ==
- José Gola
- Rosa Rosen
- Francisco Álvarez
- Héctor Bonati
- Ernesto Villegas
- Antonio Capuano
