= Patricia Castell =

Argentine actress

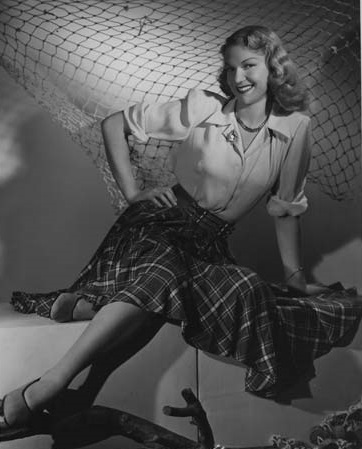
- Patricia Castell during the Golden Age of Argentine cinema
- Born: Ovidia Amanda Paramidani Padín; 25 April 1926; Avellaneda, Buenos Aires Province, Argentina
- Died: 29 September 2013 (aged 87); Buenos Aires, Argentina
- Occupation: Actress
- Years active: 1944–2009

Patricia Castell, born Ovidia Amanda Paramidani Padín (25 April 1926 – 29 September 2013), was an Argentine actress, appearing on radio, television and in films. Born in Avellaneda in 1926, her career began in the 1940s and lasted for more than fifty years.

In 1949 she starred in the boxing drama Diez segundos, the first of many appearances alongside María Rosa Gallo over several decades, including Perla Negra and Zíngara (1996). She starred in many soap operas/telenovelas, and was perhaps best known for her portrayal of the evil Cecilia in the soap opera Celeste.

== Death ==
Castell, aged 87, died in Buenos Aires, Argentina on 29 September 2013.

== Filmography ==
- 1944: Hay que casar a Paulina
- 1948: La serpiente de cascabel
- 1948: The Street Calls
- 1949: Diez segundos
- 1950: El Zorro pierde el pelo
- 1950: La culpa la tuvo el otro
- 1955: Sinfonía de juventud
- 1958: Las apariencias engañan
- 1970: Su comedia favorita (TV Series, 1 episode)
- 1970: Perdón para una mujer (TV Series, 9 episodes)
- 1971: Teleteatro Palmolive del aire (TV Series, 1 episode)
- 1971: Teleteatro Palmolive del aire (TV Series, 1 episode)
- 1971: La comedia del domingo (TV Series, 1 episode)
- 1971: Estación retiro (TV Series, 208 episodes)
- 1972: Me llaman Gorrión (TV Series, 39 episodes)
- 1970-1972: Alta comedia (TV Series, 2 episodes)
- 1972: Mi amigo Luis
- 1973: Mi dulce enamorada (TV Series, 28 episodes)
- 1972-1973: Malevo (TV Series, 272 episodes)
- 1973: El teatro de Myriam de Urquijo (TV Series, 3 episodes)
- 1974: La madre María
- 1975: No hace falta quererte (TV Series, 19 episodes)
- 1976: El gato (TV Series, 19 episodes)
- 1977: El cuarteador (TV Series 1977, 19 episodes)
- 1979: Novia de vacaciones (TV Series, 29 episodes)
- 1979: Andrea Celeste (TV Series, 1 episode)
- 1980: Llena de amor (TV Series, 19 episodes)
- 1980: Hola Pelusa (TV Series, 19 episodes)
- 1981: Los especiales de ATC (TV Series, 1 episode)
- 1981: Herencia de amor (TV Series, 19 episodes)
- 1981: Eugenia (TV Series, 19 episodes)
- 1981: Comedias para vivir (TV Series, 1 episode)
- 1982: Teatro de humor (TV Series, 3 episodes)
- 1982: Los exclusivos del Nueve (TV Series 1982, 1 episode)
- 1982: El oriental (TV Series, 19 episodes)
- 1983: Señorita maestra (TV Series, 199 episodes)
- 1984: Séptimo grado... adiós a la escuela (TV Series)
- 1985: Libertad condicionada (TV Series, 284 episodes)
- 1985: El pulpo negro (TV Mini Series, 13 episodes)
- 1988: Vendedoras de Lafayette (TV Series, 29 episodes)
- 1990: Vendedoras de Lafayette (TV Series, 3 episodes)
- 1990: Stress (TV Series, 28 episodes)
- 1991: Chiquilina mía (TV Series, 195 episodes)
- 1991: Celeste (TV Series, 172 episodes)
- 1991: Antonella (TV Series, 39 episodes)
- 1993: Casi todo, casi nada (TV Series, 29 episodes)
- 1994: Black Pearl (TV Series, 200 episodes)
- 1996: Gypsy (TV Series, 1 episode)
- 1999: Champions of Life (TV Series, 9 episodes)
- 1999-2000: Vulnerables (TV Series, 57 episodes)
- 2001: Yago, Pure Passion (TV Series, 32 episodes)
- 2002: Runaway Lady (TV Series, 2 episodes)
- 2002-2004: Sweethearts (TV Series, 32 episodes)
- 2004: Los secretos de papá (TV Series, 1 episode)
- 2006: Sos mi vida (TV Series, 38 episodes)
- 2009: Valientes (TV Series, 1 episode)
- 2012: El Tabarís, lleno de estrellas (TV Movie)
