= Malisa Zini =

Argentine actress

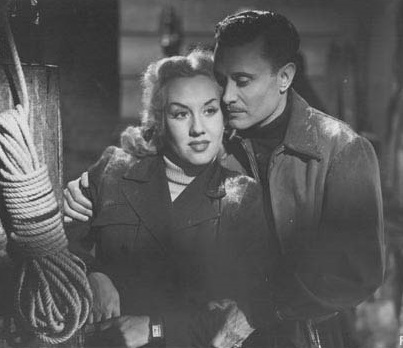
- Born: March 5, 1921; Buenos Aires, Argentina
- Died: February 26, 1985 (aged 63); Buenos Aires, Argentina
- Occupation: Actress

Malisa Zini (March 5, 1921 – February 26, 1985) was an Argentine actress of the Golden Age of Argentine cinema. She starred in the 1950 film Arroz con leche, among others such as Cumbres de hidalguía, under director Carlos Schlieper. s

== Selected filmography ==
- The Boys of the Old Days Didn't Use Hair Gel (1937)
- Honeysuckle (1938)
- Our Natacha (1944)
- The Prodigal Woman (1945)
- Lauracha (1946)
