= Marta Ferrari =

1956 film by Julio Saraceni

- Directed by: Julio Saraceni
- Written by: Carlos Gorostiza
- Starring: Fanny Navarro; Santiago Gómez Cou; Aída Luz
- Cinematography: Ricardo Younis
- Edited by: Gerardo Rinaldi, Antonio Ripoll
- Music by: Astor Piazzolla
- Distributed by: Artistas Argentinos Asociados
- Release date: 17 August 1956
- Running time: 85 minutes
- Country: Argentina
- Language: Spanish

Marta Ferrari is a 1956 Argentine film directed by Julio Saraceni. The film is about a successful actress who tells a journalist of her love for a musician who abandoned her once she succeeded.

== Cast ==
- Fanny Navarro
- Duilio Marzio
- Ricardo Castro Ríos
- Santiago Gómez Cou
- Raúl Rossi
- Juan Carlos Barbieri
- Aída Luz
- Arsenio Perdiguero
- María Esther Corán
