= El Comisario de Tranco Largo =

- Directed by: Leopoldo Torres Ríos
- Release date: 1942
- Running time: 73 minute
- Country: Argentina
- Language: Spanish

El Comisario de Tranco Largo is a 1942 film of the Golden Age of Argentine cinema.

== Cast ==
- Alí Salem de Baraja - José Julián Califa
- Mario Baroffio - Don Ramiro
- Isabel Figlioli
- Ada Méndez
- Pepito Petray
- Pedro Maratea - Aniceto Vargas
- Claudio Martino
- Lydia Quintana - Luciana
- Susana Campos
- Antonio Capuano
- Marino Seré
- Joaquín Petrosino - Sargent
