= Horacio Estol =

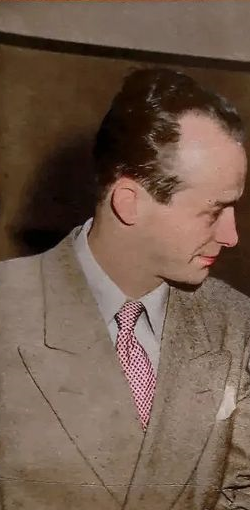

Horacio Estol was an Argentine journalist and writer based in New York. From there he wrote the columns for which he was famous, writing for publications such as the Clarín newspaper or Autoclub, the journal of the Argentine Automobile Club.

Estol's 1946 book on the Argentine boxer Luis Ángel Firpo was the subject of the 1949 movie Diez segundos (Ten Seconds), directed by Alejandro Wehner. The climax comes with the fight in New York on 14 September 1923 between Firpo, called "The Wild Bull of the Pampas", with Jack Dempsey. Estol claimed that when Dempsey fell out of the ring he took more than ten seconds to climb back, thus losing the fight. However the referee, who later committed suicide, allowed the fight to continue with Dempsey declared the winner. The book was weak and the director of Diez segundos was inexperienced, resulting in a disappointing film.

Estol was editor of the humorous political magazine Cascabel, which first appeared on 19 November 1941. In July 1945 Estol was acting as the New York representative of the Argentine boxer Abel Cestac, whom Dempsey and Firpo had agreed to jointly manage. At this time his command of English was said to be poor. From the mid-1950s Estol began to regularly write articles about the US space program, with abundant drawings and photos of the first rockets. By 1959 he was described as the "dean of Argentine correspondents in the United States". Another source described him as being in effect an honorary Argentine consul in the United States.

== Bibliography ==
- Horacio Estol (1944). Lawrence, el árabe. Hachette. p. 200.
- Horacio Estol (1946). La aventura del aire. Vida de los hermanos Wright / Horacio Estol. Buenos Aires: Hachette.
- Horacio Estol (1946). Vida y combates de Luis Angel Firpo. Editorial Bell. p. 348.
- Horacio Estol (1947). El tiburón del Quillá. Editorial Castellvi. p. 254.
- Horacio Estol (1956). Realidad y leyenda de Pancho Villa. Hachette. p. 171.
- Horacio Estol (1959). Nueva York de cerca. Compañía General Fabril. p. 403.
