= The Squeezing Hand =

La mano que aprieta
- Film poster
- Directed by: Enrique Carreras
- Written by: Domingo Di Núbila based on Julio Porter and Raúl Gurruchaga play.
- Produced by: Luis Carreras; Nicolás Carreras; Enrique Carreras
- Starring: Gogó Andreu; Tono Andreu; Alfredo Barbieri; Amelia Vargas
- Cinematography: Gumer Barreiros
- Edited by: José Gallego
- Music by: Vlady
- Production company: Productora General Belgrano
- Release date: January 21, 1953
- Running time: 80 minutes
- Country: Argentina
- Language: Spanish

The Squeezing Hand (La mano que aprieta) is a 1953 Argentine crime comedy film directed by Enrique Carreras during the classical era of Argentine cinema. It was adapted for the screen by Domingo Di Núbila from a Julio Porter and Raúl Gurruchaga play. It stars Gogó Andreu, Tono Andreu, Alfredo Barbieri and Amelia Vargas and premiered on 21 January 1953.

== Plot ==
Three relatives of a millionaire plot to kill her in order to inherit her fortune, but a quirky doctor who happens to be a detective interferes.

== Cast ==
- Gogó Andreu
- Tono Andreu
- Alfredo Barbieri
- Mario Baroffio
- Tito Climent
- María del Río
- Ángel Eleta
- Inés Fernández as Lola
- Don Pelele
- Hugo Pimentel
- Roberto Real
- Semillita as Martín
- Amelia Vargas

== Reception ==
El Heraldo del Cinematografista stated: "It is regrettable that the intrigue, not very original but with many possibilities, suspenseful, was not given more prominence in the concern of constantly achieving realistic effects, particularly in charge of Alfredo Barbieri." On the other hand, the critic Manuel Rey (known as King) said: "It achieves...its purpose of making people laugh."
