= Intermezzo criminal =

- Directed by: Luis Moglia Barth
- Written by: Emilio Villalba Welsh
- Cinematography: Vicente Cosentino
- Edited by: Gerardo Rinaldi, Antonio Ripoll
- Music by: Alberto Soifer
- Release date: 1953
- Country: Argentina
- Language: Spanish

Intermezzo criminal is a 1953 Argentine film directed by Luis Moglia Barth during the classical era of Argentine cinema.

== Cast ==
- Olinda Bozán
- Carlos Castro
- Hugo Devieri
- Dringue Farías
- María Fernanda
- Victoria Garabato
- Ubaldo Martínez
- Pablo Palitos
- Teresita Pintos
- Alberto Quiles
- Domingo Sapelli
- Maruja Soler
- Enrique Zingoni
