= Héroes sin fama =

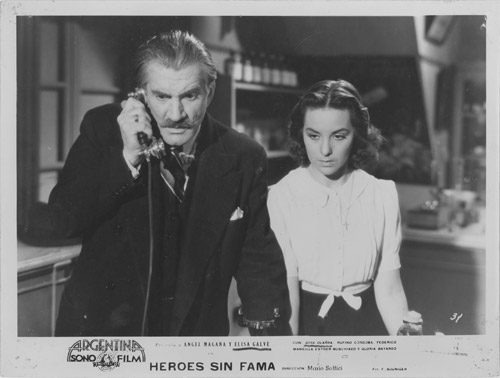
- Theatrical release poster
- Directed by: Mario Soffici
- Written by: Carlos A. Olivari; Sixto Pondal Ríos
- Release date: April 10, 1940
- Running time: 73 minutes
- Country: Argentina
- Language: Spanish

Héroes sin fama is a 1940 Argentine comedy-drama film of the Golden Age of Argentine cinema directed by Mario Soffici.

== Cast ==
- Gloria Bayardo
- Cayetano Biondo
- María Esther Buschiazzo
- Rufino Córdoba
- Elisa Galvé
- Adolfo Linvel
- Ángel Magaña
- Federico Mansilla
- José Olarra
- Joaquín Petrocino
- Leticia Scury
- Marino Seré
- Félix Tortorelli
