= El Hijo del crack =

- Directed by: Leopoldo Torre Nilsson and Leopoldo Torres Ríos
- Produced by: Armando Bo
- Starring: Armando Bo, Óscar Rovito, Miriam Sucre, Francisco Pablo Donadio
- Cinematography: Enrique Wallfisch
- Edited by: Rosalino Caterbeti
- Music by: Alberto Gnecco and José Rodríguez Faure
- Production company: Sociedad Independiente Filmadora Argentina
- Release date: December 15, 1953
- Running time: 77 minutes
- Country: Argentina
- Language: Spanish

El Hijo del crack (meaning "Son of the Star") is a 1953 Argentine sports melodrama film of the classical era of Argentine cinema, co-directed by Leopoldo Torre Nilsson and Leopoldo Torres Ríos and starring Armando Bo and Oscar Rovito. The film, a tale of a dwindling professional football star and his son was released on December 15, 1953 in Normandie cinema in Buenos Aires. The cast involved major professional football players of the time as Mario Boyé, Tucho Méndez and Ángel Labruna and journalists such as Fioravanti. It is the last film in which Leopoldo Torres Ríos and Leopoldo Torre Nilsson (father and son) worked together. The 77 minute film was produced by Sociedad Independiente Filmadora Argentina (SIFA).

== Plot ==
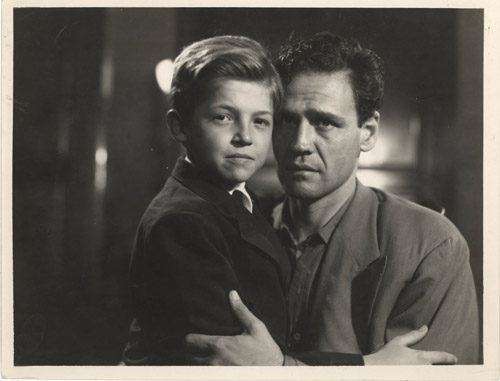
The son (Oscar Rovito) and the star (Armando Bo)

Mario Lopez (Oscar Rovito) is a child, the son of an aging footballer (Armando Bo) . On the one hand, while his father is disowned by supporters for being no longer physically able to play it, he tries to convince himself that this is a temporary decline and he will return to his former star status. On the other hand, his mother and his maternal grandfather, reject the world of football and the street, arguing that it is a primitive world and inadequate, isolating him. Only his son remains a major fan. Dying from a serious illness, he tries to please his fans once more and regain his legendary status.

== Cast ==
- Armando Bo as Héctor 'Balazo' López
- Óscar Rovito as Mario López
- Miriam Sucre as María del Carmen de López
- Francisco Pablo Donadio as Alvarado
- Pedro Laxalt
- Héctor Armendáriz
- Alberto Rinaldi
- Rolando Dumas
- Nelson de la Fuente
- Carlos Benso

== Reception ==
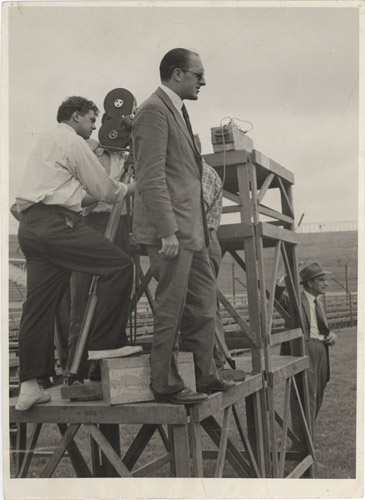
Director Leopoldo Torre Nilsson and cinematographer Enrique Wallfisch on set during filming

The International Film Guide described the film as a "purely commercial work", unlike many of Torre Nilson's other films such as El Crimen de Oribe (1950) and later films which were more art films with attention to themes, plot and psychological aspects. Jorge Miguel Couselo in his 1984 book Historia del cine argentino remarked that "despite a poor script, [the film] showed seriousness" and praised the talent and performance by Oscar Rovito playing the son. Ricardo Oliveri in his 1997 book Cine argentino: crónica de 100 años concurred that Rovito had contributed a good performance and described the film as an "agreeable product". The Institute de Literatura Argentina highlighted the strong presence of the father and son in the film and noted its neorealist elements and charge.
