= The Crime of Oribe =

1950 film

- Directed by: Leopoldo Torre Nilsson; Leopoldo Torres Ríos
- Written by: Arturo Cerretani; Leopoldo Torre Nilsson
- Based on: El perjurio de la nieve by Adolfo Bioy Casares
- Produced by: Rodolfo Hansen; Leopoldo Torres Ríos
- Starring: Roberto Escalada; Carlos Thompson; María Concepción César
- Cinematography: Hugo Chiesa
- Edited by: José Cardella
- Music by: Alberto Soifer; Bernardo Stalman
- Production company: Estudios Mapol
- Distributed by: Cinematografía Independencia
- Release date: 13 April 1950
- Running time: 85 minutes
- Country: Argentina
- Language: Spanish

The Crime of Oribe (Spanish: El crimen de Oribe) is a 1950 Argentine fantasy drama film directed by Leopoldo Torre Nilsson and Leopoldo Torres Ríos and starring Roberto Escalada, Carlos Thompson and María Concepción César. The film's sets were designed by the art director Carlos T. Dowling. It is based on the story El perjurio de la nieve by Adolfo Bioy Casares.

== Cast ==
- Roberto Escalada as Villafañe
- Carlos Thompson as Oribe
- Raúl De Lange as Vermehren
- María Concepción César as Lucía
- Carlos Cotto as Dr. Battis
- Diana Wells as Eugenia
- Paula Darlan as Ruth Vermehren
- Delia Cristiani as Adelaida Vermehren
- Trudy Tomis as Margarita Vermehren
- Arturo Arcari as Américo
- Max Citelli as Lacava
- Alberto Rinaldi
- Francisco Monet
- Juan Alberto Domínguez
- José Sereno
- Miguel Leporace
- Rafael Ricardo
- Néstor Johan
- Mario Conflitti

== Bibliography ==
- King, John & Torrents, Nissa (ed.) The Garden of Forking Paths: Argentine Cinema. British Film Institute, 1988.
- Thompson, Currie K. Picturing Argentina: Myths, Movies, and the Peronist Vision. Cambria Press, 2014.
- Lockhart, Darrell B. Latin American Mystery Writers: An A-to-Z Guide. Bloomsbury Publishing, 2004.
