= Nace un campeón =

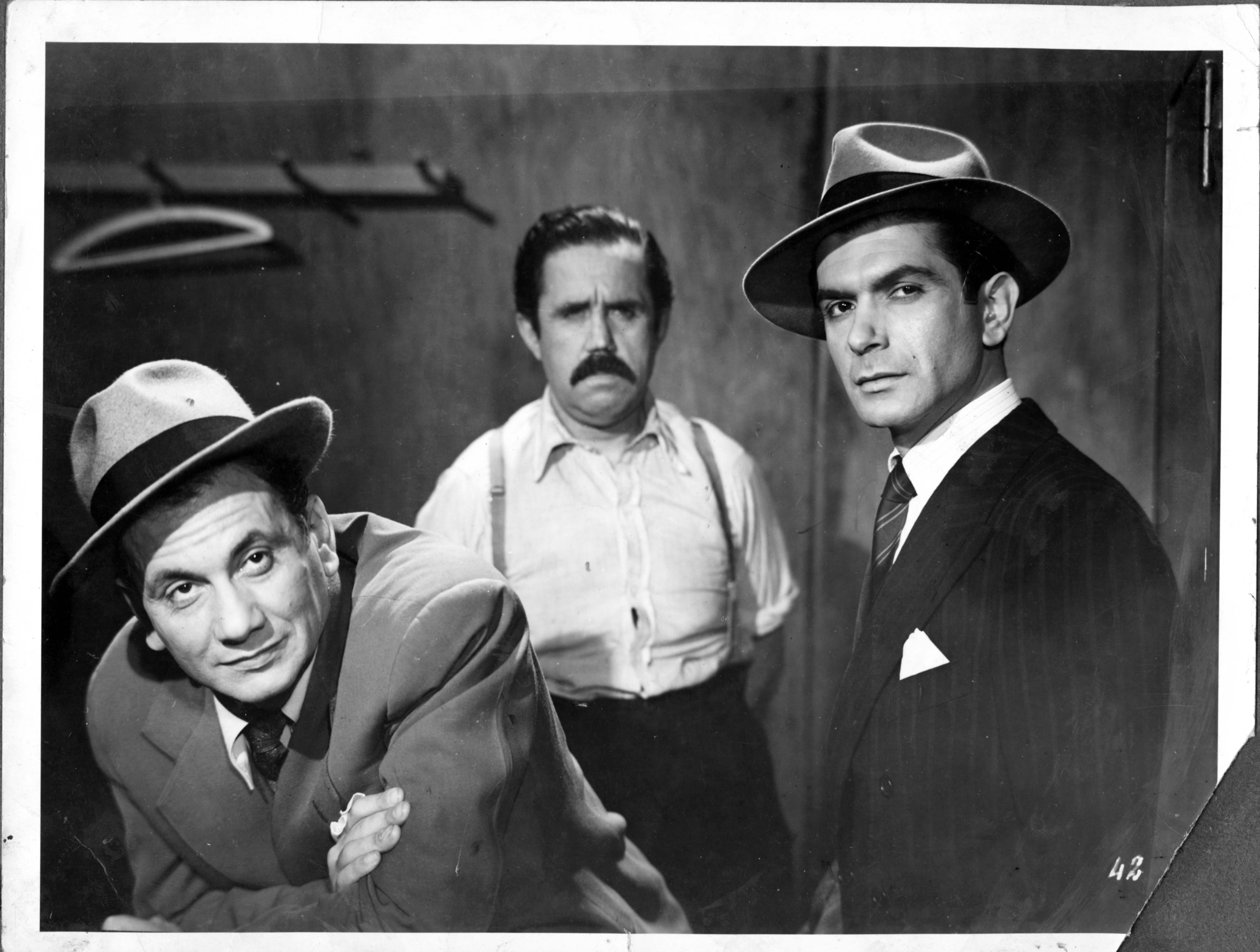
- Directed by: Roberto Ratti
- Edited by: Jorge Gárate
- Music by: Silvio Vernazza
- Release date: 17 April 1952 (World)
- Running time: 82 mins.
- Country: Argentina
- Language: Spanish

Nace un campeón is a 1952 Argentine film directed by Roberto Ratti during the classical era of Argentine cinema. It was filmed in Buenos Aires.

== Cast ==
- Ricardo Castro Rios
- Raul del Valle
- Mario Spósito
- Cyril Etuline
- Luis Firpo
- Ángel Prio
- Gloria Ramirez
