= The Gaucho and the Devil =

1952 Argentine Western drama film

El Gaucho y el diablo
- Film poster
- Directed by: Ernesto Remani
- Written by: José María Fernández Unsáin
- Based on: The Bottle Imp by Robert Louis Stevenson
- Starring: Juan José Míguez; Elisa Galvé; Francisco Martínez Allende; Elina Colomer
- Cinematography: Álvaro Durañona y Vedia
- Edited by: Antonio Ripoll
- Music by: Peter Kreuder
- Production company: Emelco
- Distributed by: Interamericana
- Release date: 3 November 1952 (Argentina)
- Running time: 83 minutes
- Country: Argentina
- Language: Spanish
- Budget: $275,000

El Gaucho y el diablo (The Gaucho and the Devil) is a 1952 Argentine drama film of the classical era of Argentine cinema, directed by Ernesto Remani, based on a script by José María Fernández Unsain, who adapted it from the 1891 short story "The Bottle Imp", by Robert Louis Stevenson. The film stars Juan José Míguez, Elisa Galvé, Francisco Martínez Allende, and Elina Colomer.

== Synopsis ==
A rancher makes a pact with the devil to find happiness and love.

== Cast ==
- Juan José Míguez
- Elisa Galvé
- Francisco Martínez Allende
- Elina Colomer
- Raúl del Valle
- Víctor Ferrari
- César Fiaschi
- Audón López
- Cristina Pall
- Blanca del Prado

== Production ==
Production of El gaucho y el diablo commenced in October 1950.

== Reception ==
La Razón said of the film: "A failed attempt...the lack of laboratories for developing the film, a technical aspect that had to be completed abroad, had a decisive influence. This resulted in a series of defects in the editing and an appreciable lack of unity in the layout."
