= Night Arrival =

1949 film

- Directed by: José Antonio Nieves Conde
- Written by: Carlos Blanco; Antonio Pérez Sánchez; Hans Rothe (novel); Gonzalo Torrente Ballester
- Starring: Adriana Benetti; Manolo Fábregas; Pedro Maratea
- Cinematography: José F. Aguayo
- Music by: Jesús García Leoz
- Production company: Marta Films
- Release date: 1949
- Country: Spain
- Language: Spanish

Night Arrival (Spanish: Llegada de noche) is a 1949 Spanish crime film directed by José Antonio Nieves Conde and starring Adriana Benetti, Manolo Fábregas and Pedro Maratea.

== Synopsis ==
During the celebration of the Ibero-American Exposition in Seville, a girl and her mother arrive from Uruguay to visit the city. Once installed, her mother disappears unexpectedly.

== Cast ==
- Adriana Benetti as Ina
- Manolo Fábregas as Fernando
- Pedro Maratea as Don Carlos Junquera
- Antoñita Moreno as Amparo la Gaditana
- Amparo Martí as Doña Milagros
- Juan Espantaleón as Don León
- Mariano Asquerino as Alcalde
- Antonio Almorós as Novio de Amparo
- Ramón Martori as Administrador del hotel
- José Prada as Inspector de policía
- Tony Hernández as Botones
- Pilar Gómez as Camarera del hotel
- Delia Luna as Lolita
- Nieves Barbero as Madre de Ina
- Narciso Hernández de Córdoba as Bailarín
- José Franco as Encargado de noche
- Juan Vázquez as Encargado de día
- Agustina de Albaicín as Gitana
- Emilio Santiago as Cochero Curro
- Valeriano Andrés as Mozo de estación
- Conchita Constanzo as Huésped

== Bibliography ==
- D'Lugo, Marvin. Guide to the Cinema of Spain. Greenwood Publishing, 1997.
