= Los Pagares de Mendieta =

- Directed by: Leopoldo Torres Ríos
- Written by: Leopoldo Torres Ríos
- Screenplay by: Ernesto Marsili
- Produced by: Adolfo Z. Wilson
- Starring: Tito Lusiardo
- Cinematography: Carlos Torres Rios
- Music by: Rodolfo Sciammarella/Itzvan Weissdhaus
- Release date: 18 October 1939
- Running time: 78 minutes
- Country: Argentina
- Language: Spanish

Los Pagares de Mendieta is a 1939 Argentine comedy film directed by Leopoldo Torres Ríos during the Golden Age of Argentine cinema. The film premiered in Buenos Aires on 18 October 1939 and starred Tito Lusiardo.

== Cast ==
- Tito Lusiardo as Pancho
- Severo Fernandez as Teodi
- Felisa Mary as Micaela
- Rosa Rosen as Clota
- Mary Paretz as Betti
- Armando de Vicent
- Antonio Capuano
- Arturo Palito
