= Caras argentinas =

- Directed by: Carmello Santiago
- Release date: May 18, 1939
- Running time: 62 minute
- Country: Argentina
- Language: Spanish

Caras argentinas is a 1939 Argentine musical film drama directed by Carmello Santiago. The film premiered in Buenos Aires on May 18, 1939 during the Golden Age of Argentine cinema.

== Cast ==
- Francisco de Paula
- Elisa Galvé
- Miguel Leme
- Aída Vignan
