= Gran valor en la facultad de medicina =

Gran valor en la facultad de medicine is a 1981 Argentine film directed by Enrique Cahen Salaberry.
