= My Divine Poverty =

1951 film

- Directed by: Alberto D'Aversa
- Written by: Tulio Carella; Alberto D'Aversa; Enrique Rodríguez Johnson
- Produced by: Armando Bo
- Starring: Elina Colomer; Armando Bó
- Cinematography: Gumer Barreiros
- Edited by: Vicente Castagno; José Cañizares
- Music by: Alberto Gnecco; José Rodríguez Faure
- Production company: Sociedad Independiente Filmadora Argentina
- Release date: 12 June 1951
- Running time: 73 minutes
- Country: Argentina
- Language: Spanish

My Divine Poverty (Spanish: Mi divina pobreza) is a 1951 Argentine drama film of the classical era of Argentine cinema, directed by Alberto D'Aversa and starring Elina Colomer and Armando Bó.

== Cast ==
- Elina Colomer
- Armando Bó
- Rafael Frontaura
- Julián Bourges
- María Esther Corán
- Juan Carlos Prevende
- Carlos Barbetti
- Raúl Roa
- Manuel Alcón
- José Guisone

== Bibliography ==
- César Maranghello. Breve historia del cine argentino. Celesa, 2005.
