= Fascinación =

- Directed by: Carlos Schlieper
- Written by: Carlos A. Olivari, Sixto Pondal Ríos
- Starring: Alicia Barrié; Héctor Calcaño; Susana Campos
- Cinematography: Adolfo W. Slazy
- Edited by: Antonio Ripoll
- Music by: Julián Bautista
- Release date: 27 September 1949
- Running time: 83 minutes
- Country: Argentina
- Language: Spanish

Fascinación is a 1949 Argentine melodrama film of the classical era of Argentine cinema, directed by Carlos Schlieper and starring Alicia Barrié, Héctor Calcaño, and Susana Campos.

== Cast ==
- Alicia Barrié
- Héctor Calcaño
- Susana Campos
- Homero Cárpena
- Arturo de Córdova
- Ricardo Duggan
- Rafael Frontaura
- Elisa Galvé
- Bernardo Perrone
