= Edición extra =

- Directed by: Luis Moglia Barth
- Written by: Alejandro Verbitzky, Emilio Villalba Welsh
- Starring: Jorge Salcedo; Silvana Roth
- Cinematography: Vicente Cosentino
- Edited by: Atilio Rinaldi
- Music by: Isidro B. Maiztegui
- Release date: 26 October 1949
- Running time: 81 minutes
- Country: Argentina
- Language: Spanish

Edición extra is a 1949 Argentine film of the classical era of Argentine cinema, directed by Luis Moglia Barth and starring Jorge Salcedo and Silvana Roth.

== Cast ==
- Jorge Salcedo as Alberto Giménez
- Silvana Roth as Irene Garmendia
- Alita Román as Lucila Torres
- Eduardo Cuitiño as Carlos Linares
- Domingo Sapelli as Diputado Méndez
- Federico Mansilla as Senador Medina
- Elisardo Santalla as Eusebio Pedroso
- José de Angelis as Dr. Gigena
- Carlos Fioriti as Chávez
- Ricardo Trigo as Pedro
