= Honeysuckle (film) =

- Film poster
- Directed by: Luis César Amadori
- Written by: Luis César Amadori; Ivo Pelay
- Produced by: Angel Mentasti
- Starring: Hugo del Carril; Libertad Lamarque; Malisa Zini; Miguel Gómez Bao
- Cinematography: John Alton
- Edited by: Carlos Rinaldi
- Music by: Hans Diernhammer
- Production company: Sono Film
- Distributed by: Sono Film
- Release date: 5 November 1938
- Running time: 93 minutes
- Country: Argentina
- Language: Spanish

Honeysuckle (Spanish: Madreselva) is a 1938 Argentine melodrama musical film directed by Luis César Amadori. With Ivo Pelay, Amadori co-wrote the play upon which the film is based. Starring Hugo del Carril, Libertad Lamarque and Malisa Zini, it premièred in Buenos Aires on 5 November 1938 and was a popular success. Its plot is loosely based on the lyrics of a tango song of the same name. It is a tango film, an extremely popular genre during the Golden Age of Argentine cinema (1930s–1950s). It was screened at the Venice Film Festival.

During the production, Del Caril met Ana María Lynch who was working on the film as an extra. They began a decade-long relationship during which time the couple appeared together in several films.

== Synopsis ==
A film star enjoys a romance with the daughter of a puppeteer, but his criminal past threatens to ruin things.

== Cast ==
- Libertad Lamarque
- Hugo del Carril
- Malisa Zini
- Miguel Gómez Bao
- Perla Mary
- Leo Rapoli
- Julio Traversa
- Julio Renato
- Max Citelli
- Alberto Terrones
- Amelia Lamarque
- Arturo Bamio
- Ángel Boffa

== Bibliography ==
- Rist, Peter H. Historical Dictionary of South American Cinema. Rowman & Littlefield, 2014.
