= Marcos Caplán =

Argentine actor

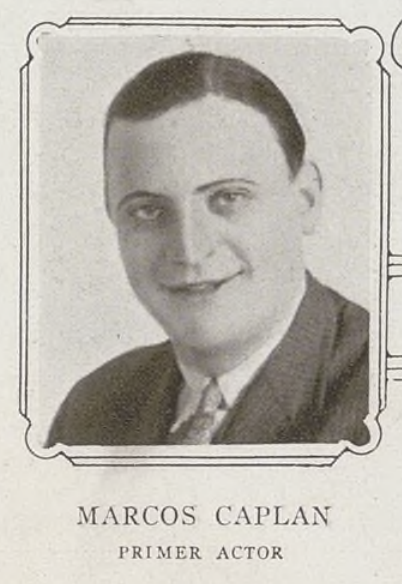
- Born: 15 March 1905; Buenos Aires, Argentina
- Died: 3 October 1979 (aged 74); Buenos Aires, Argentina
- Occupation: Actor
- Years active: 1936–1955 (film)

Marcos Caplán (15 March 1905 – 3 October 1979) was an Argentine stage and film actor.

== Selected filmography ==
- Paths of Faith (1938)
- Lucrezia Borgia (1947)

== Bibliography ==
- Finkielman, Jorge. The Film Industry in Argentina: An Illustrated Cultural History. McFarland, 2003.
