= Facundo, el tigre de los llanos =

1952 film

- Directed by: Miguel P. Tato Carlos F. Borcosque
- Written by: Carlos F. Borcosque, Antonio Pagés Larraya
- Produced by: Manuel Cabouli, Luis María Álvarez
- Starring: Francisco Martínez Allende; Zoe Ducos; Félix Rivero
- Cinematography: Bob Roberts
- Edited by: Nicolás Proserpio
- Music by: Alberto Ginastera
- Release date: 1952
- Running time: 90 minutes
- Country: Argentina
- Language: Spanish

Facundo, el tigre de los llanos is a 1952 Argentine biographical film of the classical era of Argentine cinema, based on the life of La Rioja province's strongman Facundo Quiroga. The movie was directed by Miguel P. Tato and Carlos F. Borcosque.

== Cast ==
- Francisco Martínez Allende
- Zoe Ducos
- Félix Rivero
- Miguel Bebán
- Jorge Molina Salas
- Pascual Nacarati
- Mario Cozza
- Hugo Mújica
- Cirilo Etulain
