= Dringue, Castrito y la lámpara de Aladino =

- Written by: León Mirlas, Emilio Villalba Welsh
- Cinematography: Vicente Cosentino, Ernesto Keleti
- Edited by: Gerardo Rinaldi
- Release date: 18 February 1954
- Running time: 93 minutes
- Country: Argentina
- Language: Spanish

Dringue, Castrito y la lámpara de Aladino is a 1954 Argentine film directed by Luis Moglia Barth during the classical era of Argentine cinema.

== Cast ==
- Dringue Farías
- Carlos Castro "Castrito"
- Carmen Torres
- Pascual Nacaratti
- Tincho Zabala
- Carlos Enríquez
- Teresa Pintos
- Mariano Bauzá
- Carmen Amaya ...Bailarina
- Eduardo Armani
- Alfonso Pisano
