= Ricardo Duggan =

Argentine film actor

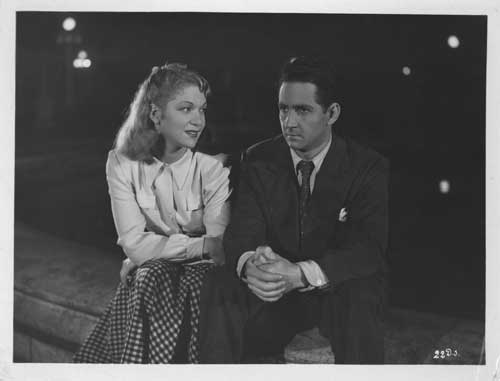
Duggan with Patrica Castell in Diez segundos (1949)

Ricardo Duggan (born 23 October 1907) (or Dugan) was an Argentine film actor, active in the late 1940s and early 1950s. In 1949 he played the lead role in the boxing drama Diez segundos as an aspiring young boxer.

== Selected filmography ==
- Nunca te diré adiós (1947)
- Estrellita (1947)
- Los hijos del otro (1947)
- Vacations as Santiago (1948)
- Tierra del fuego (1948)
- La dama del collar (1948)
- Fascinación (1949)
- Diez segundos (1949)
- Romance en tres noches (1950)
- Soy del tiempo de Gardel (1954)
