= Pierina Dealessi =

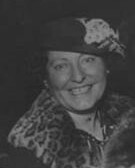
- Dealessi circa 1925
- Born: December 25, 1894; Italy
- Died: January 21, 1983
- Occupation: Actress

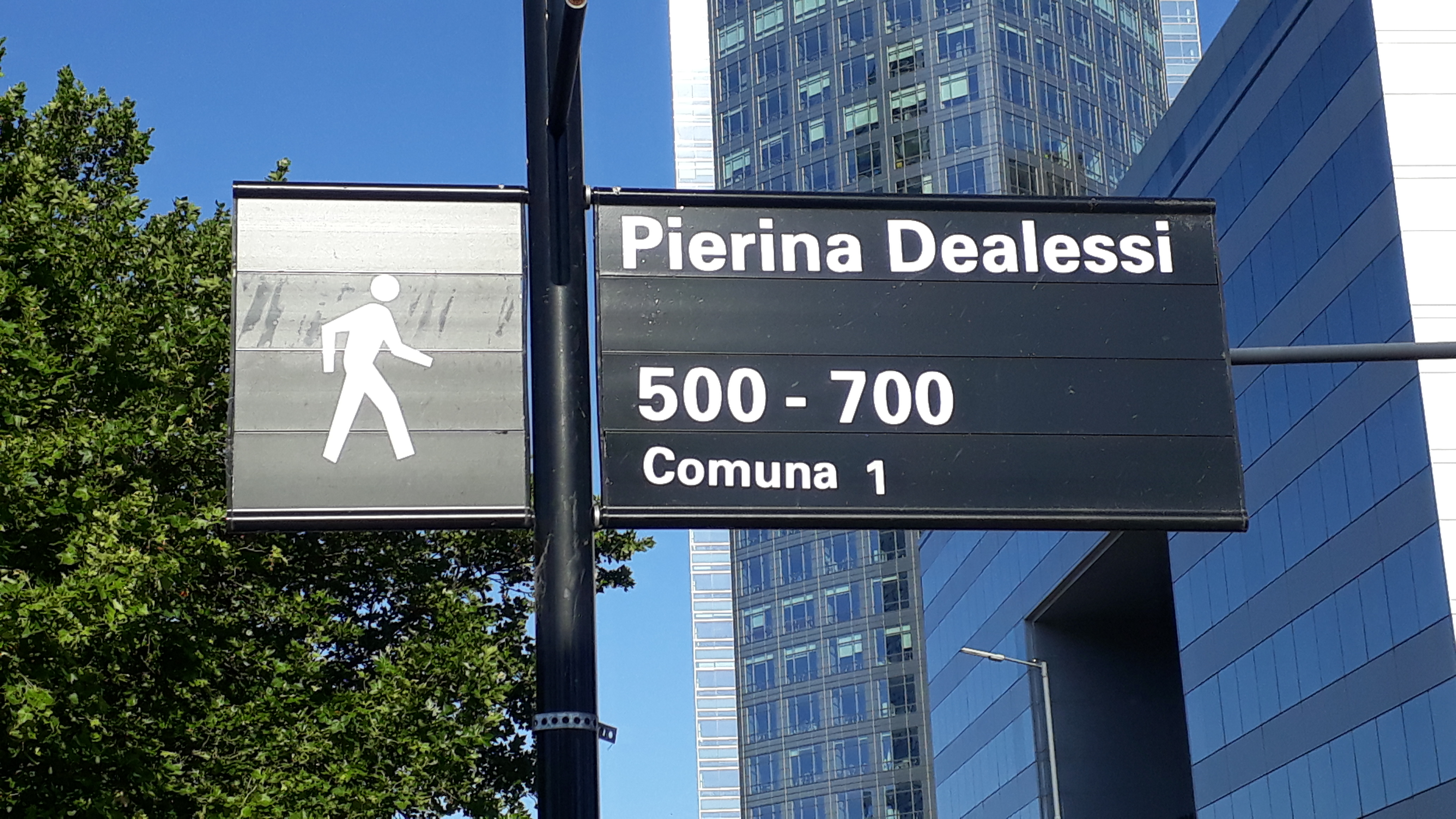
Street sign in Buenos Aires.

Pierina Dealessi (December 25, 1894 – January 21, 1983) was an Italian-born Argentine actor. She let fellow actress (and later First Lady) Eva Perón sleep on her couch while they were acting in the same movies, and later served on the board of the Ateneo Cultural Eva Perón.

== Selected filmography ==
- Goodbye Argentina (1930)
- Puente Alsina (1935)
- Fúlmine (1949)
- Pantalones cortos (1949)
- Mi hermano Esopo (1952)
- That Forward Center Died at Dawn (1961)
- No toquen a la nena (1976)
