= El Hombre que amé =

- Directed by: Alberto De Zavalia
- Written by: Guy Endore (story); César Tiempo (writer)
- Produced by: Alberto De Zavalia
- Cinematography: José María Beltrán
- Edited by: Oscar Carchano
- Music by: Juan Ehlert
- Release date: 1947
- Running time: 86 min.
- Country: Argentina
- Language: Spanish

El Hombre que amé is a 1947 film of the classical era of Argentine cinema.

== Cast ==
- Delia Garcés
- Pedro López Lagar
- Olga Casares Pearson
- Jorge Salcedo
- Julián Bourges
- Bertha Moss
- Jorge Villoldo
- Agustín Orrequia
- Adolfo Linvel
- Enrique Doyen
