= Elisa Galvé =

Argentine actress (1922–2000)

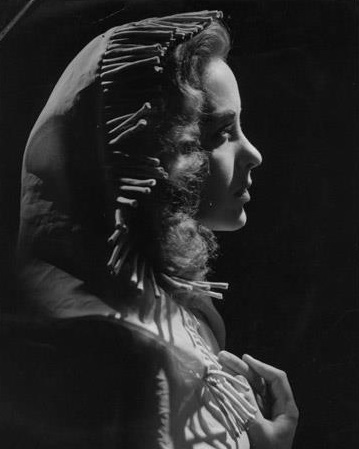
Elisa Galvé

Elisa Christian Galvé (July 20, 1922 in Buenos Aires – October 20, 2000 in Rome) was an Argentine actress. She was best known for her roles in films in the 1940s and 1950s, during the Golden Age of Argentine cinema.

She made her film debut in 1939 in the film Caras argentinas, and made her last film appearance in Dos en el mundo in 1966. She starred in the acclaimed Silver Condor-winning 1943 film Juvenilia.

== Filmography ==
Year	Title	Role	Notes
1939	Caras argentinas		
1939	Prisoners of the Earth	Andrea Else a.k.a. Chinita	
1940	Héroes sin fama	Aurora Goyena	
1940	Cita en la frontera		
1941	I Want to Die with You	Laura	
1942	Vacations in the Other World		
1943	Three Men of the River		
1943	Juvenilia		
1944	When Spring Makes a Mistake	Lucila	
1944	El camino de las llamas		
1945	Wake Up to Life		
1945	Chiruca		
1947	El misterioso tío Sylas		
1948	La gran tentación		
1948	White Horse Inn		
1949	Fascinación		
1951	Cartas de amor	Celia Gamboa	
1951	Mujeres en sombra		
1952	Emergency Ward		
1952	The Gaucho and the Devil		
1952	The Idol	Elena	
1954	Misión extravagante	Cristina Parera	
1954	Comedians	Ana Ruiz	
1954	Días de odio	Emma Zunz	
1954	El domador		
1954	Siete gritos en el mar		
1955	Embrujo en Cerros Blancos		
1957	La Bestia humana		
1964	Aconcagua		
1964	Sombras en el cielo		
1966	Dos en el mundo		(final film role)
