= Cumbres de hidalguía =

- Directed by: Julio Saraceni
- Written by: Luis Olivo Gallo
- Cinematography: Gumer Barreiros
- Edited by: Rosalino Caterbeti, Jorge Levillotti
- Music by: Alejandro Gutiérrez del Barrio
- Release date: 1 July 1947
- Running time: 85 minutes
- Country: Argentina
- Language: Spanish

Cumbres de hidalguía is a 1947 Argentine adventure film of the classical era of Argentine cinema, directed by Julio Saraceni and written by Luis Olivo Gallo. It stars Roberto Airaldi, Ricardo Passano and Malisa Zini.

== Plot ==
An engineer leads an expedition to the summit of a mountain and is blamed when a young girl on the team plummets to her death.

== Cast ==
- Roberto Airaldi
- Ricardo Passano
- Malisa Zini
- Carlos Perelli
- Cirilo Etulain
- Alba Castellanos
- Joaquín Petrosino
- Jacinto Herrera
- Roberto Bordoni
- Manuel Alcón
- Enrique Thomas
- Hugo Ferrer
- Rodolfo San Angelo
- Juan Solucio
- José Helman

== Reception ==
Clarín wrote: "The dramatic intensity of the film is achieved only by the fire of human feelings for the violent explosion of nature. There is a snowstorm on the peaks of the mountains, rarely seen in films." Raúl Manrupe and María Alejandra Portela believed that the difficult terrain and snowstorm in the film affected the performances.
