= Paths of Faith =

1938 film by Luis Moglia Barth

- Directed by: Luis Moglia Barth
- Written by: Luis Moglia Barth
- Starring: Amanda Ledesma; Floren Delbene; Pedro Maratea; Marcos Caplán
- Cinematography: José María Beltrán
- Music by: Mario Maurano
- Production company: Argentina Sono Film
- Distributed by: Argentina Sono Film
- Release date: 26 October 1938
- Running time: 79 minutes
- Country: Argentina
- Language: Spanish

Paths of Faith (Spanish:Senderos de fe) is a 1938 Argentine drama film of the Golden Age of Argentine cinema directed by Luis Moglia Barth and starring Amanda Ledesma, Floren Delbene and Pedro Maratea.

== Cast ==
- Amanda Ledesma
- Floren Delbene
- Pedro Maratea
- Marcos Caplán
- Juan Carlos Thorry
- Silvia Durante
- Juan Bono
- Ernesto Villegas
- Lalo Malcolm
- Elvino Vardaro

== Bibliography ==
- Rist, Peter H. Historical Dictionary of South American Cinema. Rowman & Littlefield, 2014.
