= Barrio Gris =

1954 film by Mario Soffici

- Directed by: Mario Soffici
- Written by: Joaquín Gómez Bas; Mario Soffici
- Starring: Luis Arata; Vicente Ariño
- Cinematography: Humberto Peruzzi
- Edited by: José Cardella
- Music by: Tito Ribero
- Distributed by: Cinematográfica V
- Release date: 27 October 1954
- Running time: 95 min.
- Country: Argentina
- Language: Spanish

Barrio Gris is a 1954 Argentine film of the classical era directed by Mario Soffici. The film won the Silver Condor Award at the 1955 Argentine Film Critics Association Awards.

== Cast ==
- Luis Arata ... Don García
- Vicente Ariño ... Don Avelino
- María Esther Corán ... Verdulera
- Carlos Cotto ... Padre de Zulema
- Alberto de Mendoza ... Claudio
