= Santos Vega Returns =

- Directed by: Leopoldo Torres Ríos
- Written by: Rafael Obligado (poem); Leopoldo Torre Nilsson; Leopoldo Torres Ríos
- Starring: Juan José Miguez; Delfy de Ortega; Pedro Maratea
- Cinematography: Carlos Torres Ríos
- Edited by: José Cardella
- Music by: Daniel López Barretto
- Release date: 16 April 1947
- Running time: 90 minutes
- Country: Argentina
- Language: Spanish

Santos Vega Returns (Spanish:Santos Vega vuelve) is a 1947 Argentine historical adventure film of the classical era of Argentine cinema, directed by Leopoldo Torres Ríos and starring Juan José Miguez, Delfy de Ortega and Pedro Maratea. It is based on the story of Santos Vega.

== Cast ==
- Juan José Miguez as Santos Vega
- Delfy de Ortega as La Prienda
- Pedro Maratea as Juan Sin Ropa
- Eloísa Cañizares
- Enrique García Satur
- Pascual Nacarati
- Maruja Roig
- Isabel Figlioli
- Antonio Capuano
- Irma Denás
- Jorge Ayala
- Juan Pérez Bilbao

== Bibliography ==
- Tad Bentley Hammer. International film prizes: an encyclopedia. Garland, 1991.
