= La patrulla chiflada =

- Film poster
- Directed by: Carlos Rinaldi
- Written by: Máximo Aguirre
- Cinematography: Francis Boeniger
- Edited by: Atilio Rinaldi
- Music by: Tito Ribero
- Distributed by: Artistas Argentinos Asociados
- Release date: 17 June 1952
- Running time: 80 minutes
- Country: Argentina
- Language: Spanish

La Patrulla chiflada is a 1952 Argentine adventure comedy film of the classical era of Argentine cinema that is set in Africa, directed by Carlos Rinaldi and featuring the Los Cinco Grandes del Buen Humor (Five Greats of Good Humor) group of comic actors. It stars Rafael Carret, Jorge Luz, Zelmar Gueñol, Guillermo Rico and Juan Carlos Cambón.

== Plot ==
The film begins with the Five aboard a ship sailing to Africa. The group later cross the desert on camel and the jungle and stay in a palace.

== Cast ==
- Rafael Carret
- Guillermo Rico
- Jorge Luz
- Zelmar Gueñol
- Juan Carlos Cambón
- Susana Campos
- José Comellas
- Julián Bourges
- María Esther Corán
- Irma Gabriel
- Cristina Berys
- Edith Boado
- Antonio Provitilo

== Reception ==
Raúl Manrupe and María Alejandra Portela in their book Un diccionario de films argentinos (1930-1995) opined that La patrulla chiflada was one of the best films of the group, "well directed and contained by Rinaldi, with good gags".
