= Agustín Cuzzani =

Argentine dramatist

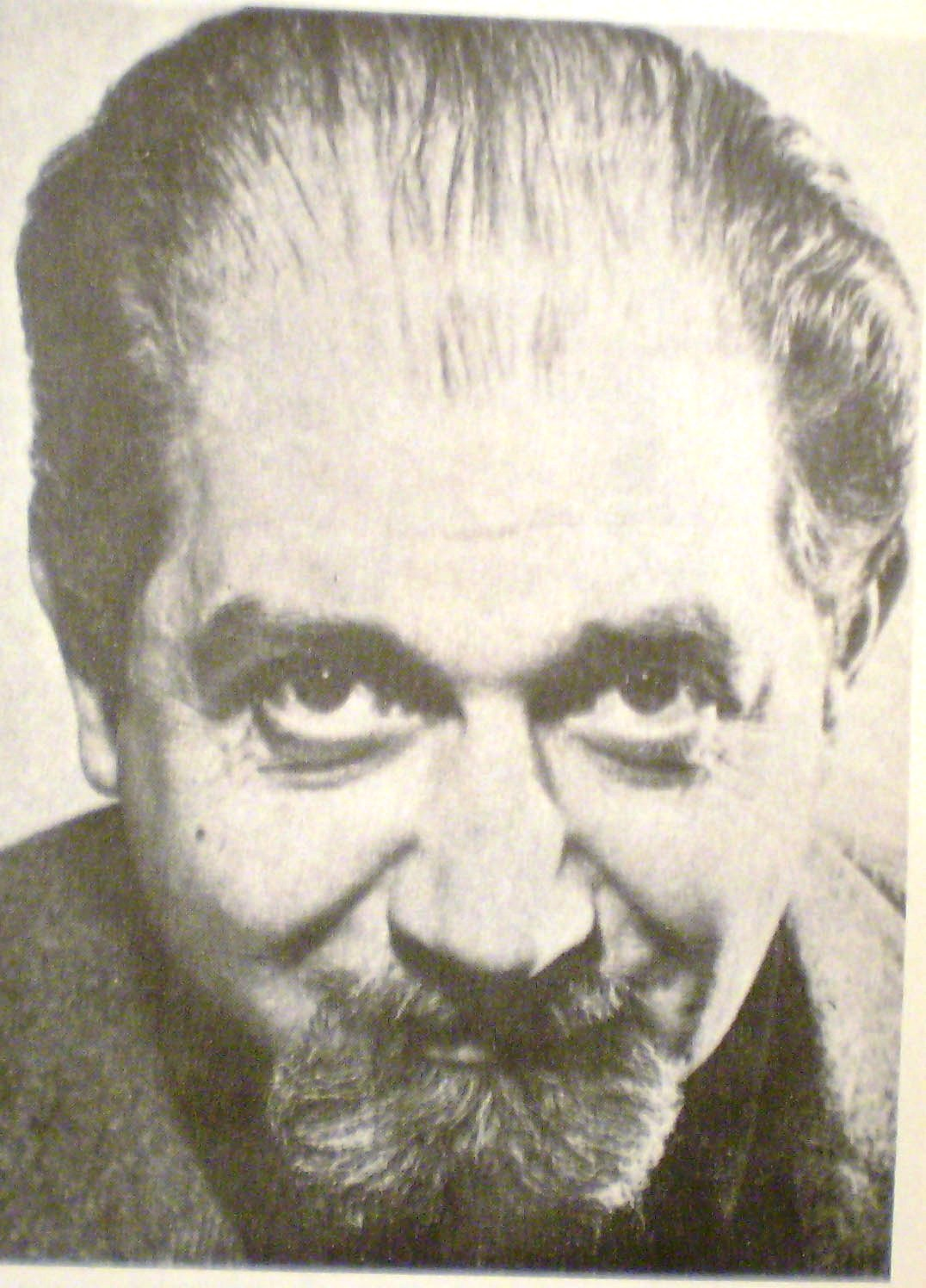
Agustín Cuzzani

Agustín Cuzzani (1924 in Buenos Aires – December 25, 1987 in Córdoba) was an Argentine dramatist, known for his satiric vision and criticism of capitalist society. He is famous for having created farsátira as a theatrical genre. His most famous and transcendental work is El centroforward murió al amanecer. In 1988 his collected plays were published as "Teatro Completo".

== Biography ==
Cuzzani studied at the University of Buenos Aires where he received his law degree.

In 1954 he opened his first play, Una libra de carne which was well received in Argentina, Latin America and Europe. The following year he presented El centroforward murió al amanecer which would become his most famous piece. His created the theatrical genre of farsátira, the fusion of farce and satire.

== Works ==
=== Narratives ===
- Mundos Absurdos (1942)
- Lluvia para Yosia (1950)
- Las puertas del verano (1956)

=== Dramas ===
- Dalilah (1952)
- Una libra de carne (1954)
- El centroforward murió al amanecer (1955)
- Los indios estaban cabreros (1958)
- Sempronio (1962)
- Para que se cumplan las escrituras (1965)
- Pitagoras, go home (1984)
- Lo cortés no quita lo caliente (1985)

== See also ==
- Theater
- Culture of Argentina

== Sources ==
- Diccionario de autores latinoamericanos de César Aira
