= Mi hermano Esopo =

1952 Argentine film

- Directed by: Luis Mottura
- Written by: María Luz Regás and Roberto Gil
- Music by: George Andreani
- Release date: 1952
- Running time: 84 minute
- Country: Argentina
- Language: Spanish

Mi hermano Esopo is a 1952 Argentine film of the classical era of Argentine cinema, directed by Luis Mottura and written by María Luz Regás and Roberto Gill. It premiered on 17 January 1952 and starred Mario Fortuna, Gregorio Cicarell, Pierina Dealessi and Susana Campos.

== Synopsis ==
A young man must take the place of his ailing father in driving a carriage.

== Cast ==
- Mario Fortuna
- Gregorio Cicarelli
- Pierina Dealessi
- Susana Campos
- Marcelino Ornat
- Diana Ingro
- Cayetano Biondo
- Ángel Walk
- Sara Olmos
- Inda Ledesma
- Juan Pecci
- José Nájera
- Serafín Paoli
- Arturo Vita
- Carlos Belluci
- Liana Noda
