= Crisol de hombres =

- Directed by: Arturo Gemmiti
- Written by: Abel Santa Cruz
- Cinematography: Alfredo Traverso
- Music by: Juan Ehlert
- Release date: 1954
- Running time: 80 minutes
- Country: Argentina
- Language: Spanish

Crisol de hombres is a 1954 film of the classical era of Argentine cinema written by Abel Santa Cruz and directed by Arturo Gemmiti. The film stars Pedro Maratea, Guillermo Pedemonte, Roberto Durán, and Fernando Siro.

== Plot ==
The film revolves around a group of young conscripts serving under a strict sergeant. However, despite his stern exterior, he understands and empathizes with the new recruits.

== Cast ==
- Pedro Maratea
- Guillermo Pedemonte
- Roberto Durán
- Eduardo Otero
- Fernando Siro
- Margarita Linton
- Hilda Rey
- Milo Quesada
- Eduardo Montemar
- Ernesto Fontán
- Saul Jarlip
- Juan Carrera
- Pablo Cumo
- Alma Vélez
- Edgardo Montesmar
- Maruja Roig
- Liana Moabro
- Rodolfo Zapata
