= Corazón fiel =

- Directed by: Leopoldo Torres Ríos
- Written by: Noel Barona, Arturo Cerretani
- Starring: Margarita Canale, Carlos Carella, Jorge De La Riestra, Claudio Lucero
- Cinematography: Antonio Prieto
- Release date: 1954
- Running time: 67 minute
- Country: Argentina
- Language: Spanish

Corazón fiel is a 1954 Argentine film directed by Leopoldo Torres Ríos during the classical era of Argentine cinema.
