= La pasión desnuda =

1953 film by Luis César Amadori

- Directed by: Luis César Amadori
- Written by: Luis César Amadori
- Cinematography: Antonio Merayo
- Edited by: Jorge Gárate
- Music by: Julián Bautista
- Release date: 1953
- Running time: 111 minutes
- Country: Argentina
- Language: Spanish

La pasión desnuda (Naked Passion) is a 1953 Argentine film of the classical era. It was written and directed by Luis César Amadori and starred María Félix, Carlos Thompson and Eduardo Cuitiño.

The Argentine Academy of Cinematography Arts and Sciences gave Cuitiño the award for outstanding male performance in this film.

== Cast ==
- María Félix as Malva Rey
- Carlos Thompson as Pablo Valdes
- Eduardo Cuitiño
- Héctor Calcaño
- Diana Ingro
- Milagros de la Vega
- Diana Miriam Jones
- Margarita Burke
- José Comellas
- Gloria Ferrandiz
- Daniel Tedeschi
