= Mi viudo y yo =

- Directed by: Enrique Cahen Salaberry
- Written by: Ariel Cortazzo
- Starring: Andrés Mejuto
- Release date: 1954
- Running time: 82 minute
- Country: Argentina
- Language: Spanish

Mi viudo y yo is a 1954 film of the classical era of Argentine cinema.
