= Pichot =

Pichot is a surname. Notable people with the surname include:

- Agustín Pichot (born 1974), Argentine rugby union player
- Alan Pichot (born 1998), Argentine chess grandmaster
- Alexandre Pichot (born 1983), French cyclist
- Amédée Pichot (1795–1877), French historian and translator
- André Pichot (1950–2025), French academic, researcher and historian of science
- Malena Pichot (born 1982), Argentine stand-up comedian
- Matthieu Pichot (born 1989), French footballer
- Ramon Pichot (1871–1925), Catalan artist
- Stéphane Pichot (born 1976), French association football player

== See also ==
- Sophie Moressée-Pichot (born 1962), French fencer
- Francisco Pichott (born 1953), Chilean triple jumper
