= Ellos nos hicieron así =

- Directed by: Mario Soffici
- Written by: Carlos A. Olivari, Sixto Pondal Ríos
- Produced by: Eduardo Bedoya
- Starring: Olga Zubarry, Tito Alonso, Alberto de Mendoza
- Cinematography: Francis Boeniger
- Edited by: Ricardo Rodríguez Nistal, Atilio Rinaldi
- Music by: Tito Ribero
- Release date: 1952
- Running time: 90 min
- Country: Argentina
- Language: Spanish

Ellos nos hicieron así is a 1952 Argentine film directed by Mario Soffici during the classical era of Argentine cinema.

== Cast ==
- Olga Zubarry
- Tito Alonso
- Alberto de Mendoza
- Alberto Dalbés
- Mirtha Torres
- Golde Flami
- Domingo Sapelli
- Benito Cibrián
- Casimiro Krukowski
- Luis Medina Castro
- Dora Vernet
- Nina Brian
- Saul Jarlip
- Elena Cruz
- Vicente Thomas
- María Esther Buschiazzo
- Paride Grandi
- Mónica Linares
- Carlos Cotto
- José De Angelis
- María Pérez
- Tito Grassi
- Pura Díaz
- Carmen Giménez
- Francisco Audenino
- Rafael Diserio
- Warly Ceriani
- Alberto Rudoy
- Luis Otero
