= Pedro Maratea =

Argentine actor

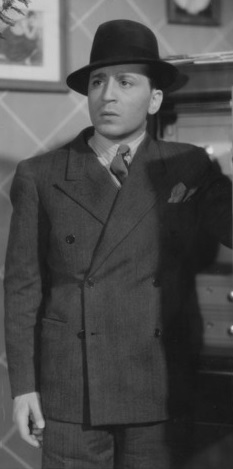
- Pedro Maratea in 1946
- Born: 21 December 1912; Buenos Aires, Argentina
- Died: 1 July 2002 (aged 89); Buenos Aires, Argentina
- Occupation: Actor
- Years active: 1935-1958 (film)

Pedro Maratea (December 21, 1912 – July 1, 2002) was an Argentine film actor.

== Selected filmography ==
- Outside the Law (1937)
- Paths of Faith (1938)
- Mother Gloria (1940)
- Pachamama (1944)
- Santos Vega Returns (1947)
- Night Arrival (1949)
- Suburb (1951)
- Crisol de hombres (1954)

== Bibliography ==
- Finkielman, Jorge. The Film Industry in Argentina: An Illustrated Cultural History. McFarland, 2003.
