= Días de odio =

- Directed by: Leopoldo Torre Nilsson
- Written by: Jorge Luis Borges Leopoldo Torre Nilsson
- Produced by: Armando Bó
- Starring: Elisa Galvé Nicolas Freguês Raul del Valle Enrique de Pedro Duilio Marzio Virginia Romay
- Cinematography: Enrique Wallfisch
- Release date: 1954
- Running time: 70 Minutes
- Country: Argentina
- Language: Spanish

Días de odio, literally translated as Days of Hate, is a 1954 Argentine film produced during the classical era of Argentine cinema. It is based on the short story Emma Zunz by Jorge Luis Borges. Días de odio was directed by Leopoldo Torre Nilsson and filmed in black and white. The script was adapted by Nilsson from the short story "Emma Zunz" by Jorge Luis Borges (first published in 1949). The film was released on 3 June 1954, starring Elisa Galvé, Nicolas Freguês, Raul del Valle, Enrique de Pedro, Duilio Marzio and Virginia Romay in the main roles. The producer of the film was Armando Bó.

== Synopsis ==
Emma Zunz (played by Elisa Galve) is a young, lonely girl. One day she receives a letter communicating that her father, who had been imprisoned in Brazil, has committed suicide. Knowing that the businessman Plesner (played by Nicolás Fregues) is responsible for framing her father and ruining their family, Emma plans and executes her revenge.

== Cast ==
- Elisa Galvé as Emma Zunz
- Nicolás Fregues as Plesner
- Raúl del Valle as The Sailor
- Enrique de Pedro as The Father
