= Fúlmine =

1949 film by Luis Bayón Herrera

- Directed by: Luis Bayón Herrera
- Release date: 1949
- Country: Argentina
- Language: Spanish

Fúlmine is a 1949 Argentine film directed by Luis Bayón Herrera during the classical era of Argentine cinema. It is based on Guillermo Divito's comic strip Fúlmine character.

== Cast ==
- Pepe Arias
- Pierina Dealessi
- Julio Renato
- Homero Cárpena
- Marga Landova
- Eduardo Otero
- Adolfo Stray
- Domingo Mania
- Anita Palmero [credited as Ana Palermo]
- Fanny Stein
- Coca Villalba
- Ángel Boffa
- Susana Campos
- Arturo Arcari
- Agustín Andrades
- Pablo Cumo
- María Esther Corán
