= Diez segundos =

- Directed by: Alejandro Wehner; Carlos D'Agostino
- Written by: Manuel Arellano Martín; Horacio Estol
- Produced by: Ciriaco Hernández; Carlos D'Agostino
- Starring: Ricardo Duggan; María Esther Buschiazzo; Patricia Castell; Delfy de Ortega; María Rosa Gallo; Oscar Valicelli; Oscar Villa
- Cinematography: Antonio Prieto
- Music by: Juan Ehlert; C. Sesso Ocampo
- Production company: Emelco
- Release date: 1949
- Running time: 83 minutes
- Country: Argentina
- Language: Spanish

Diez segundos (Ten Seconds) is a 1949 Argentine film of the classical era of Argentine cinema, directed by Alejandro Wehner and produced by Emelco studios. The film is a boxing drama starring Ricardo Duggan, María Esther Buschiazzo, Patricia Castell, Carlos D'Agostino (voice), Delfy de Ortega, María Rosa Gallo, Oscar Valicelli and Oscar Villa. It premiered on November 23, 1949 in Buenos Aires. The film was distributed by Interamericana. Castell and Rosa Gallo would later star alongside each other in several films and television series over several decades including Perla Negra and Zíngara (1996).

== Plot ==
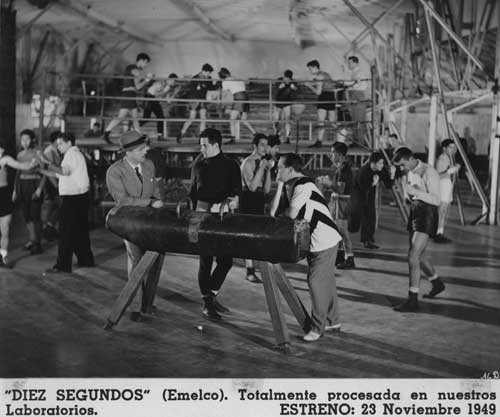
Boxing school in the film

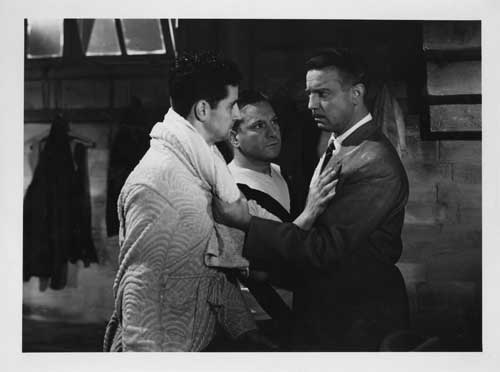
Image taken onset of Diez segundos. On the left, Ricardo Duggan, in dressing gown and towel on the neck, in the center, Oscar Villa laying a hand on the chest of Raul del Valle on the right holding the towel.

The film is loosely based on Horacio Estol's 1946 Vida y combates de Luis Angel Firpo, a biography of the Argentine boxer Luis Ángel Firpo who came close to beating Jack Dempsey in 1923.

In the film, a humble lad starts to learn to box to defend himself, then goes on to become a professional boxer. He is trained heavily by Oscar Villa. Duggan's love interest in the film is played by Patrica Castell.

== Cast ==
- María Esther Buschiazzo
- Patricia Castell
- Carlos D'Agostino
- Delfy de Ortega
- Ricardo Duggan
- María Rosa Gallo
- Oscar Valicelli
- Raul del Valle
- Oscar Villa

== Reception ==
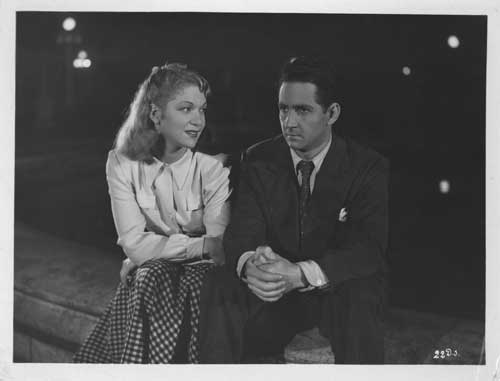
Duggan with love interest Patricia Castell

The book which the film was based on, Estol's Vida y combates de Luis Angel Firpo (1946) was received quite poorly and Wehner was inexperienced as a director, resulting in a disappointing film.

A critic of the newspaper Noticias Gráficas said (in English): "They have used a narrative method that disappoints the viewer" and compared it to the delirium a boxer experiences when being knocked out. Diario Critica newspaper said (in English) "Some secrets of the technique get some interesting effects, but it reveals absolute nullity in the management of the interpreter."

The authors of a 2009 analysis of the role of sports in Juan Peron’s government see the film as an example of the government’s pursuit of national advancement and social mobility through sporting achievement. Its MALBA entry describes it as a classic Argentinian B movie and as a faithful, almost anthropological, representation of life in a Buenos Aires neighborhood of the time.
