= Estrellita (film) =

- Directed by: Román Viñoly Barreto
- Produced by: Alberto De Zavalia
- Cinematography: José María Beltrán
- Edited by: Oscar Carchano
- Music by: Isidro B. Maiztegui
- Release date: 1947
- Country: Argentina
- Language: Spanish

Estrellita is a 1947 Argentine melodrama film of the classical era of Argentine cinema, directed by Román Viñoly Barreto.

== Cast ==
- Yeya Duciel
- José Olarra
- Luis Zaballa
- Ricardo Duggan
- Marcos Zucker
- Carmen Llambí
- Rafael Salzano
- Carlos Belluci
- Norma Giménez
- Diego Marcote
- María Bayardo
- Marisa Núñez ...Extra
