= Embrujo en Cerros Blancos =

- Directed by: Julio Rossi
- Written by: Óscar Magdalena (adaptation), Carlos Alberto Orlando
- Starring: Elisa Galvé, Rolando Chávez, Raúl del Valle
- Cinematography: Luis Galán de Tierra
- Edited by: Jorge Levillotti
- Music by: Domingo Federico
- Release date: 1955
- Running time: 95 min
- Country: Argentina
- Language: Spanish

Embrujo en Cerros Blancos is a 1955 Argentine film.

== Cast ==
- Elisa Galvé
- Rolando Chávez
- Raúl del Valle
- Liana Noda
- Nathán Pinzón
