= El Hijo de la calle =

- Release date: 1949
- Running time: 80 minute
- Country: Argentina
- Language: Spanish

El Hijo de la calle is a 1949 film of the classical era of Argentine cinema.

== Cast ==
- Toscanito as Andresito Pérez
- Carmen Valdez as the mother
- Florén Delbene as Eduardo
- María Concepción César
- Guillermo Battaglia as the vagabond
- Guillermo Pedemonte as the doctor
- Alberto Rinaldi as the friend
- Narciso Ibáñez as the porter
- Raúl Roa as the official
- Arturo Arcari
