= Honour Your Mother =

- Directed by: Alberto D'Aversa
- Written by: Carlos Alberto Orlando
- Produced by: Armando Bo
- Cinematography: Enrique Wallfisch
- Edited by: Rosalino Caterbeti; Jorge Levillotti
- Music by: Alberto Gnecco; José Rodríguez Faure
- Production company: Sociedad Independiente Filmadora Argentina
- Release date: 1951
- Running time: 70 minute
- Country: Argentina
- Language: Spanish

Honour Your Mother (Spanish: Honrarás a tu madre) is a 1951 Argentine drama film directed by Alberto D'Aversa during the classical era of Argentine cinema.

== Cast ==
- Armando Bo
- Mario Chaves
- Nelson de la Fuente
- José María Fra
- Olga Gatti
- Rodolfo Onetto
- Carlos Perelli
- Virginia Romay
- Amalia Sánchez Ariño
- Abel Togni as Presidiario

== Bibliography ==
- Jorge Abel Martín. Cine argentino. Ediciones Corregidor, 1982.
