= Susana Campos =

Argentine actress

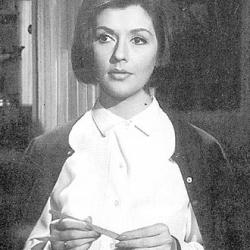
- Born: August 31, 1934; Buenos Aires, Argentina
- Died: October 16, 2004 (aged 70); Buenos Aires, Argentina
- Occupation: Actress
- Years active: 1946–2004

Susana Campos (August 31, 1934 – October 16, 2004) was an Argentine actress. She starred in the 1950 film Arroz con leche under director Carlos Schlieper.

== Filmography ==
| Year | Title | Role | Notes |
|---|---|---|---|
| 1934 | Cita en las estrellas | | |
| 1942 | El Comisario de Tranco Largo | Adelita | |
| 1944 | Mi novia es un fantasma | | |
| 1944 | La importancia de ser ladrón | | |
| 1946 | El tercer huésped | | |
| 1947 | An Ideal Husband | | |
| 1947 | 3 millones y el amor | | |
| 1948 | La serpiente de cascabel | Alumna | |
| 1948 | El Barco sale a las diez | | |
| 1948 | La novia de la Marina | | |
| 1948 | Novio, marido y amante | | |
| 1949 | Fascinación | | |
| 1949 | La cuna vacía | | |
| 1949 | Fúlmine | | |
| 1950 | Cuando besa mi marido | | |
| 1950 | ¿Vendrás a media noche? | | |
| 1950 | Arroz con leche | | |
| 1951 | Fantasmas asustados | Liliana Elizalde | |
| 1951 | The Beautiful Brummel | | |
| 1951 | Los árboles mueren de pie | Elisa | |
| 1952 | La patrulla chiflada | | |
| 1952 | Mi hermano Esopo | | |
| 1953 | The Girl Cat | María Elena | |
| 1953 | Romeo y Julita | | |
| 1953 | Uê, Paisano!... | | |
| 1954 | Caídos en el infierno | Renata Brissol | |
| 1954 | Detective | | |
| 1955 | Vida nocturna | Clarita | |
| 1955 | The Stork Said Yes | | |
| 1955 | La Delatora | Virginia | |
| 1955 | Bacará | Marta | |
| 1955 | Pecadora | Rosa | |
| 1955 | La noche de Venus | | |
| 1956 | Amor a primera vista | | |
| 1956 | Graciela | Ena Salgado | |
| 1956 | Historia de una soga | Manón | |
| 1957 | Todo sea para bien | | |
| 1958 | Amor prohibido | | |
| 1958 | Behind a Long Wall | Rosita | |
| 1958 | Rosaura at 10 O'Clock | Rosaura / Marta Córrega / María Correa | |
| 1959 | Il padrone delle ferriere | Sophie de Préfont | |
| 1959 | Bombas para la paz | Celia | |
| 1960 | Un bruto para Patricia | Patricia de Carvajal | |
| 1960 | Police Calling 091 | Julia | |
| 1960 | My Street | Petra | |
| 1961 | La vida privada de Fulano de Tal | | |
| 1961 | Siempre es domingo | Teresa | |
| 1962 | El bruto | Justina | |
| 1962 | Man on Pink Corner | La Lujanera | |
| 1962 | Accidente 703 | Paula | |
| 1962 | Escuela de seductoras | Alicia | |
| 1962 | Cena de matrimonios | Elisa | |
| 1962 | Los culpables | Arlette | |
| 1962 | You Have the Eyes of a Deadly Woman | | |
| 1963 | Una tal Dulcinea | Marcela / Dulcinea | |
| 1963 | Ensayo general para la muerte | Arlette | |
| 1963 | Piedra de toque | Dora | |
| 1964 | Como dos gotas de agua | Teresa | |
| 1964 | Le sette vipere (Il marito latino) | Mitù | |
| 1964 | La Boda | | |
| 1964 | Rueda de sospechosos | Mara | |
| 1965 | Crimen de doble filo | Laura | |
| 1966 | Django Does Not Forgive | Helen | |
| 1966 | Del brazo y por la calle | | |
| 1967 | Villa Cariño | | |
| 1968 | Coche cama alojamiento | Gloria | |
| 1968 | Let Them Talk | Blanca's Friend | |
| 1969 | The Boys Didn't Wear Hair Gel Before | La Rubia Mireya | |
| 1969 | El día que me quieras | Andrea la madre | |
| 1969 | El bulín | Business executive | |
| 1971 | Vamos a soñar por el amor | | |
| 1974 | Muñequitas de medianoche | | |
| 1975 | Bodas de cristal | | |
| 1976 | The Kids Grow Up | Cristina | |
| 1977 | Así es la vida | Eloísa Castañares | |
| 1981 | Los viernes de la eternidad | Paula | |
| 1986 | El orden cómico | Odette | |
| 1986 | Romanza final (Gayarre) | | |
| 1991 | Loraldia - El tiempo de las flores | | |
| 2003 | Captive | Elisa Dominich | |
| 2005 | Cómo pasan las horas | Virginia | (final film role) |

== Theatre ==
In 1991-1997 and 2000-2001, Campos starred Brujas with Moria Casán, Thelma Biral, Graciela Dufau, and Nora Cárpena.
