= In Body and Soul =

En cuerpo y alma
- Film poster
- Directed by: Leopoldo Torres Ríos
- Written by: Leopoldo Torres Ríos
- Produced by: Armando Bo
- Starring: Héctor Armendáriz, Hugo Balado, Cristina Berys
- Cinematography: Gumer Barreiros
- Music by: Alberto Gnecco, José Rodríguez Faure
- Production company: Sociedad Independiente Filmadora Argentina
- Distributed by: Sociedad Independiente Filmadora Argentina
- Release date: 1951
- Running time: 75 minutes
- Country: Argentina
- Language: Spanish

In Body and Soul (En cuerpo y alma) is a 1951 Argentine film directed by Leopoldo Torres Ríos during the classical era of Argentine cinema. It stars Armando Bó, Héctor Armendáriz and Julia Sandoval.

== Cast ==
- Armando Bo as Antonio Núñez
- Héctor Armendáriz as Pedro Guzmán
- Julia Sandoval as Margarita
- Virginia Romay as The mother
- Hugo Balado
- Cristina Berys as Elisa
- Rolando Dumas as Andrés
- Oscar Furlong as himself
- Omar Monza as Himself
- Eduardo Moyano
- Alberto Orián
- Enrique Giacovino
- Jorge Pittaluga
- Alberto Rinaldi
- Washington Rivera

== Reception ==
King opined in El Mundo: "Good realization in an emotional film. Clear in its exposition, with abundant comic notes at the beginning that later disappear to give way to the successful dramatic climate that the solution of the conflict demands". Raúl Manrupe and María Alejandra Portela in their book Un diccionario de films argentinos (1930–1995) wrote (translated from Spanish): "Loose triangle story, with the frame of a sport at the time of great popularity and trying to reedit the success of Pelota de trapo. The opening sequence with children is perfect."
