= Vacations (film) =

- Production company: Estudios San Miguel
- Release date: 1947
- Country: Argentina
- Language: Spanish

Vacations (Spanish: Vacaciones) is a 1947 film of the classical era of Argentine cinema.

== Cast ==
- Mecha Ortiz as Estela Arenal
- Francisco Martínez Allende as Juan
- Amalia Sánchez Ariño as Antonia
- Maruja Gil Quesada as Laura
- Manuel Collado Montes as Rómulo
- Juan Carlos Altavista as Juan Gabriel Arenal
- Luis Zaballa as Perico Arenal
- Susana Canales as Mercedes
- Ricardo Duggan as Santiago
- Lilian Valmar as María Laura
- Leticia Scury as Filomena
- Norma Giménez as Ana María
- Jesús Pampín as Andrés
- Francisco Audenino
