= El Hombre de las sorpresas =

- Release date: 1949
- Country: Argentina
- Language: Spanish

El Hombre de las sorpresas is a 1949 film of the classical era of Argentine cinema.

== Cast ==
- Elina Colomer as Margarita Cornel
- Francisco Martínez Allende as Esteban Artinelli
- Eduardo Sandrini as Enrique
- Alejandro Maximino as Dr Jusar
- Mario Baroffio as Aquiles Cornel
- Adolfo Stray as Inspector
- Esther Bence as Aunt Margarita
- Inda Ledesma as Sra. Bullosi
- Alberto Rinaldi
- Narciso Ibáñez
- Arturo Arcari
- Irma Denás
- Tita Stefani
- Andrés Vázquez
