= Alejandro Wehner =

Argentine film director

Alejandro Wehner was an Argentine film director. His work included Diez segundos (1949), Rio turbio (1951) and Fierro a fondo (1952).

His first film, Diez segundos (Ten Seconds), was based on Horacio Estol's 1946 book on the Argentine boxer Luis Ángel Firpo. The book was weak and Wehner was inexperienced, resulting in a disappointing film. Rio Turbio is a melodrama about miners in the remote town of Rio Turbio, communicating a patriotic message about the New Argentina.
