= Alberto D'Aversa =

Alberto D'Aversa (4 March 1920 in Casarano, Apulia, Italy – 21 June 1969 in São Paulo, Brazil) was an Italian film and theatre director, best known for his work in Argentina and Brazil. He was one of the most distinguished figures in the Teatro Brasileiro de Comédia scene.

== Filmography ==
Director

- 07... Tassì (1945)
- Una voce nel tuo cuore (1949)
- My Divine Poverty (1951)
- Honour Your Mother (1951)
- Muerte civil (1954)
- Los hampones (1955)
- La novia (1955)
- Seara Vermelha (1964)
- Três Histórias de Amor (1966)

Screenwriter

- 07... Tassì (1945)
- Una voce nel tuo cuore (1949)
- Mi divina pobreza (1951)
- Três Histórias de Amor (1966)
- Golias Contra o Homem das Bolinhas (1969)
