= Leopoldo Torres Ríos =

Argentine film director and screenwriter (1899–1960)

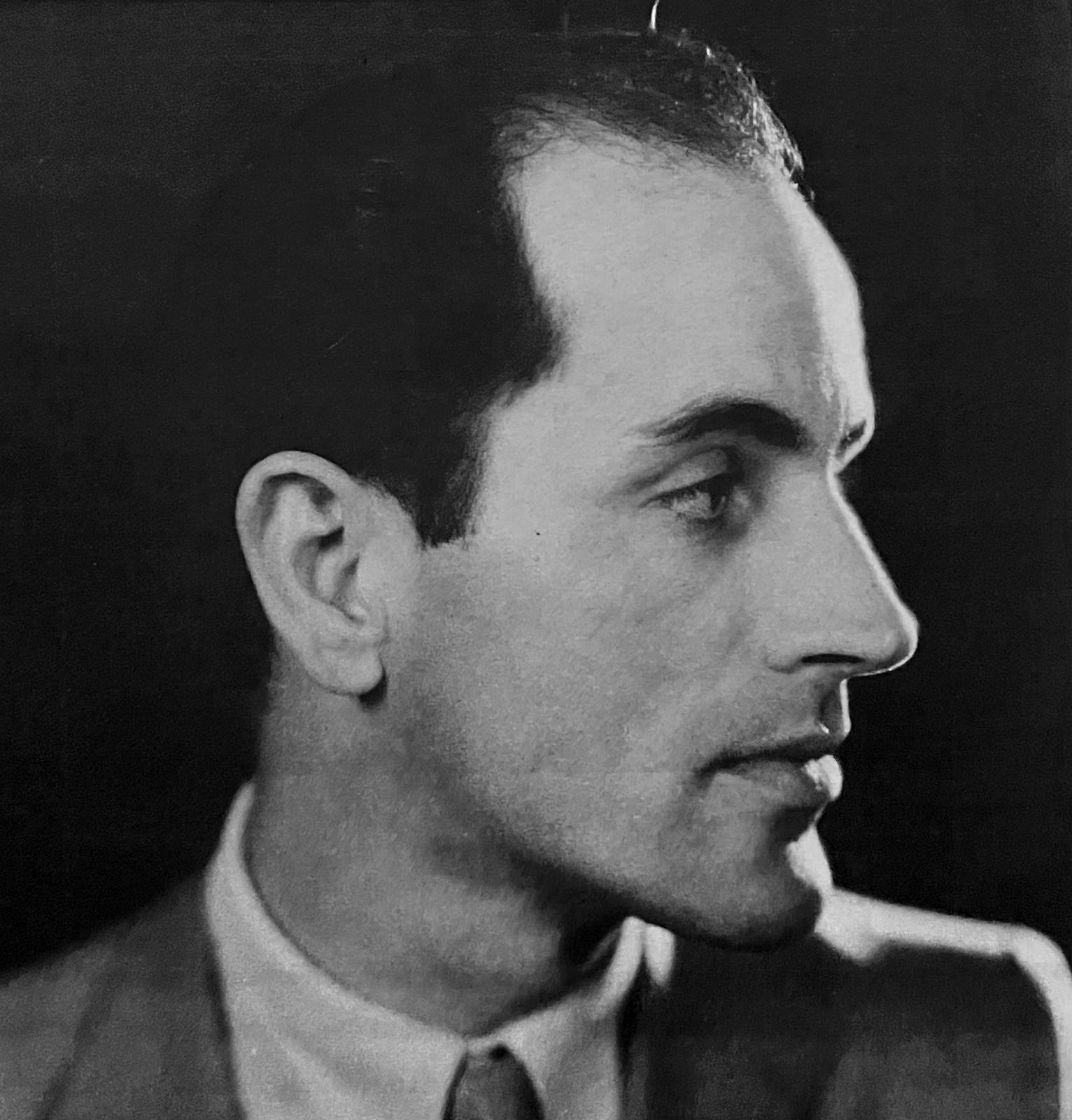
Leopoldo Torres Ríos, c. 1930s.

Leopoldo Torres Ríos (27 December 1899 – 10 April 1960) was an Argentine film director and screenwriter notable for his work during the Golden Age of Argentine cinema. His brother Carlos Torres Ríos was a notable cinematographer. His son was the film director and screenwriter Leopoldo Torre Nilsson.

Rios initially solely began as a screenwriter, writing for his first film Palomas rubias in 1920 but by 1923 he began simultaneously directing and writing for his films, producing over 40 films between the early 1920s and 1959 when he was taken ill with lung cancer. He died on 10 April 1960, aged 60, in his native Buenos Aires. His film La vuelta al nido (1938) was a commercial and critical failure but has been revalued since the 1960s as a precursor of modernist cinema.

== Filmography ==
=== As director ===
- El puñal del mazorquero (1923)
- Buenos Aires bohemio (1924)
- Empleada se necesita (1925)
- El conventillo de la Paloma (1936)
- Lo que le pasó a Reynoso (1937)
- Adiós Buenos Aires (1938)
- La vuelta al nido (1938)
- La estancia del gaucho Cruz (1938)
- El sobretodo de Céspedes (1939)
- Los pagarés de Mendieta (1939)
- La luz de un fósforo (1940)
- Sinvergüenza (1940)
- El mozo número 13 (1941)
- ¡Gaucho! (1942)
- El comisario de Tranco Largo (1942)
- El juego del amor y del azar (1944)
- La tía de Carlos (1946)
- La mujer más honesta del mundo (1947)
- Santos Vega vuelve (1947)
- El hombre del sábado (1947)
- Pelota de trapo (1948)
- Romance sin palabras (1948)
- El hijo de la calle (1949)
- Pantalones cortos (1949)
- El hombre de las sorpresas (1949)
- El nieto de Congreve (1949)
- The Crime of Oribe (1950)
- El regreso (1950)
- Corazón fiel (1951)
- La encrucijada (1952)
- En cuerpo y alma (1953)
- El hijo del crack (1953)
- Lo que le pasó a Reynoso (1955)
- Edad difícil (1956)
- Demasiado jóvenes (1958)
- Campo virgen (1958)
- Aquello que amamos (1959)

=== As screenwriter ===
- Palomas rubias (1920)
- La gaucha (1921)
- De nuestras pampas (1923)
- El guapo del arrabal(1923)
- El puñal del mazorquero (1923)
- Buenos Aires bohemio (1924)
- Empleada se necesita (1925)
- El conventillo de la Paloma (1936)
- Lo que le pasó a Reynoso (1937)
- Adiós Buenos Aires (1938)
- La vuelta al nido (1938)
- La estancia del gaucho Cruz (1938)
- El sobretodo de Céspedes (1939)
- Los pagarés de Mendieta (1939)
- La luz de un fósforo (1940)
- Sinvergüenza (1940)
- La piel de zapa (1943)
- El mozo número 13 (1941)
- ¡Gaucho! (1942)
- El comisario de Tranco Largo (1942)
- El juego del amor y del azar (1944)
- La tía de Carlos (1946)
- La mujer más honesta del mundo (1947)
- El hombre del sábado (1947)
- Pelota de trapo (1948)
- Romance sin palabras (1948)
- Pantalones cortos (1949)
- El nieto de Congreve (1949)
- El hijo de la calle (1949)
- El regreso (1950)
- La encrucijada (1952)
- En cuerpo y alma (1953)
- El hijo del crack (1953)
- Lo que le pasó a Reynoso (1955)
- Edad difícil (1956)
- Demasiado jóvenes (1958)
- Campo virgen (1958)
- Aquello que amamos (1959)
