= María Concepción César =

Argentine actress, singer, and dancer (1926–2018)

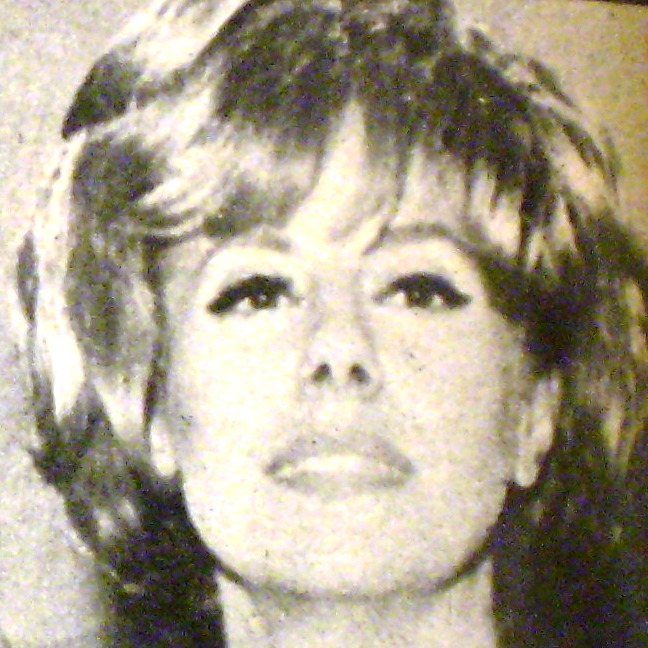
- María Concepción César, March 1969
- Born: María Concepción Cesarano; 25 October 1926; Buenos Aires, Argentina
- Died: 26 July 2018 (aged 91); Buenos Aires, Argentina
- Occupations: Actress, singer, dancer
- Years active: 1945–2013

María Concepción César (born María Concepción Cesarano; 25 October 1926 – 26 July 2018) was an Argentine actress, singer and dancer. Her first film was Pampa Bárbara with her uncle, actor Francisco Petrone.

She also achieved fame in television musical shows and soap operas. During the 1960s, she played Maggie in a theatrical version of After the Fall by Arthur Miller.

== Filmography ==
Her 37 movies were:
Amor en custodia	2005	(Love in custody).
Las aventuras de Dios	2000	(“God’s adventures”).
"Señoras sin señores"	1998	(Ladies without Gentlemen).
Mamá x 2	1997	(Television series).
Verdad consecuencia	1996	(True consequence).
La nena	1996	(The girl).
Con alma de tango	1994	(Tango soul).
Regalo del cielo	1993	(Gift from the sky).
Amándote	1998	(Loving you).
Grecia	1987	(Grecia).
El hombre que ganó la razón	1986	(The man who earned his rights).
Duro como la roca, frágil como el cristal	1985	(Hard as a rock, fragile as crystal).
Amo y señor	1984	(Television series).
La madrastra	1960	(The stepmother).
Rosaura a las 10	1958	(Rosaura at 10 o’clock).
La simuladora	1955	(The pretender).
María Magdalena	1954	(movie).
Infortunado Fortunato	1952	(Unlucky Fortunato).
El crimen de Oribe	1950	(Oribe’s crime).
La barra de la esquina	1950	(The corner group).
El regreso	1950	(The return).
El hijo de la calle	1950	(The street son).
Pantalones cortos	1949	(Short pants).
Inspiración	1946	(Inspiration).
Savage Pampas	1945	(Her first movie).
