= Rodríguez, supernumerario =

- Release date: 1948
- Country: Argentina
- Language: Spanish

Rodríguez, supernumerario is a 1948 Argentine film of the classical era of Argentine cinema.
