= Stolen Paradise (1952 film) =

- Directed by: José Arturo Pimentel
- Release date: 13 March 1952
- Country: Argentina
- Language: Spanish

Stolen Paradise (Spanish:Paraíso robado) is a 1952 Argentine film directed by José Arturo Pimentel during the classical era of Argentine cinema. It was released in Argentina, Venezuela, and Spain.

== Plot ==
Marcela loses her mental health when her boyfriend dies. Carlos, an old teacher, helps in her recovery and a romance starts between them.

== Cast ==
=== Cast ===
Actors	Characters
Juan Carlos Altavista	"Carlos"
Santiago Arrieta	
Fina Basser	(as Fina Wasserman)
Delfy de Ortega	
Rene Fischer Bauer	
Héctor Méndez	
Néstor Zavarce	

=== Production ===
Director	José Arturo Pimentel
Writer	César Tiempo
Music by	Tito Ribero
Cinematography	Américo Hoss
Film Editor	Nello Melli
Production	Gori Muñoz

== Release dates ==
Release Dates (country)
Country	Date
Argentina	13 March 1952
Venezuela	16 August 1952
Spain	1 September 1952 (Madrid)

== Technical specs ==
- Runtime: 77 min
- Sound Mix: Mono
- Color: Black and White
- Aspect Ratio: 1.37 : 1
