= Leopoldo Torre Nilsson =

Argentine film director, producer and screenwriter

- Born: Leopoldo Torres Nilsson; 5 May 1924; Buenos Aires, Argentina
- Died: 8 September 1978 (aged 54); Buenos Aires, Argentina
- Other name: Leo Towers
- Occupation: Film director

Leopoldo Torre Nilsson (5 May 1924 – 8 September 1978), also known as Leo Towers and as Babsy, was an Argentine film director, producer and screenwriter.

== Career ==
Born as Leopoldo Torres Nilsson (he later changed his paternal surname from Torres to Torre) was the son of Argentine pioneer film director Leopoldo Torres Ríos, with whom he collaborated between 1939 and 1949. He debuted in 1947 with the short El muro. His mother was an Argentine citizen of Swedish descent. His uncle was cinematographer Carlos Torres Ríos (1898–1956).

Torre Nilsson's first full-length film, El crimen de Oribe (1950), was an adaptation of Adolfo Bioy Casares's novel El perjurio de la nieve. In 1954 he directed Días de odio, based on Jorge Luis Borges's short story Emma Zunz. In 1956 he directed Graciela, based on Carmen Laforet's novel Nada, winner of Nadal Literary Prize 1944. He also directed films about icons of Argentine history and culture: Martín Fierro (1968), about the main character of Argentina's national poem; El Santo de la Espada (1970), about General José de San Martín; and Güemes: la tierra en armas (1971), about Martín Miguel de Güemes. It was entered into the 7th Moscow International Film Festival. His 1973 film Los siete locos won the Silver Bear at the 23rd Berlin International Film Festival.

Torre Nilsson was married to writer Beatriz Guido, whose work served as inspiration and who worked alongside him in many of his scripts. He is acknowledged as the first Argentine film director to be critically acclaimed outside the country, making Argentina's film production known in important international festivals. He died of cancer in his native Buenos Aires in 1978, at the age of 54. He was buried at the Cementerio Británico in Buenos Aires.

A novelized biography of Torre Nilsson, El Gran Babsy (ISBN 950-07-0895-7), by Mónica Martín, was published in 1993. Another biography, Leopoldo Torre Nilsson: Imagen y Poesía (ISBN 987-04-0581-9) was published in 2006 by the newspaper La Nación and the Aguilar editorial house.

== Selected filmography ==
- Santos Vega Returns (1947)
- The Crime of Oribe (1950)
- El Hijo del crack (1953)
- Graciela (1956)
- The House of the Angel (1957)
- The Kidnapper (1958)
- La caída (1959)
- Un guapo del 900 (1960)
- The Party Is Over (1960)
- Summer Skin (1961)
- The Hand in the Trap (1961)
- The Female: Seventy Times Seven (1962)
- The Terrace (1963)
- Once Upon a Tractor (1965; short film)
- Traitors of San Angel (1967)
- Monday's Child (1967)
- Martín Fierro (1968)
- El Santo de la Espada (1970)
- Güemes: la tierra en armas (1971)
- The Seven Madmen (1973)
