= Mario Baroffio =

Argentine actor

Mario Baroffio in Bólidos de acero (1950)

Mario Baroffio (1905–1962) was an Argentine film actor of the classic era of Argentine cinema.

Baroffio began his film career in 1936, and starred in nearly 40 films between then and his death in 1962. An actor with a varied repertoire in comedy and drama, one of his last films was Buscando a Mónica in 1962.

== Filmography ==
- El noveno mandamiento (1962)
- Buscando a Mónica (1962)
- Cumparsita, La (1961)
- Venenosa, La (1959)
- Angustia de un secreto (1959) .... Teófilo
- Dagli Appennini alle Ande (1959)
- Nubes de humo (1958)
- Cubitos de hielo (1956)
- Luces de candilejas (1956)
- Pícara soñadora, La (1956)
- Mujer desnuda, La (1955)
- Reportaje a un cadáver (1955)
- The Phantom of the Operetta (1955)
- Somos todos inquilinos (1954)
- Tres mosquiteros, Los (1953)
- La pasión desnuda (1953)
- Niña de fuego, La (1952)
- La Mano que aprieta (1952)
- ¡Qué rico el mambo! (1952)
- Tía de Carlitos, La (1952)
- Zapatillas coloradas, Las (1952)
- Cuidado con las mujeres (1951)
- Rhythm, Salt and Pepper (1951)
- Bólidos de acero (1950)
- Ladrón canta boleros, El (1950)
- Mary tuvo la culpa (1950)
- Hombre de las sorpresas, El (1949)
- Imitaciones peligrosas (1949)
- Pantalones cortos (1949)
- Rodríguez, supernumerario (1948)
- Pelota de trapo (1948) .... Don Pascual
- Senda oscura, La (1947)
- Caraba, La (1947)
- Secta del trébol, La (1947)
- Comisario de Tranco Largo, El (1942) (as Mario Román Flores) .... Don Ramiro
- Quinta calumnia, La (1941)
- Corazón de Turco (1940)
- Santos Vega (1936)
