= Enrique Cahen Salaberry =

Argentine film director (1911–1991)

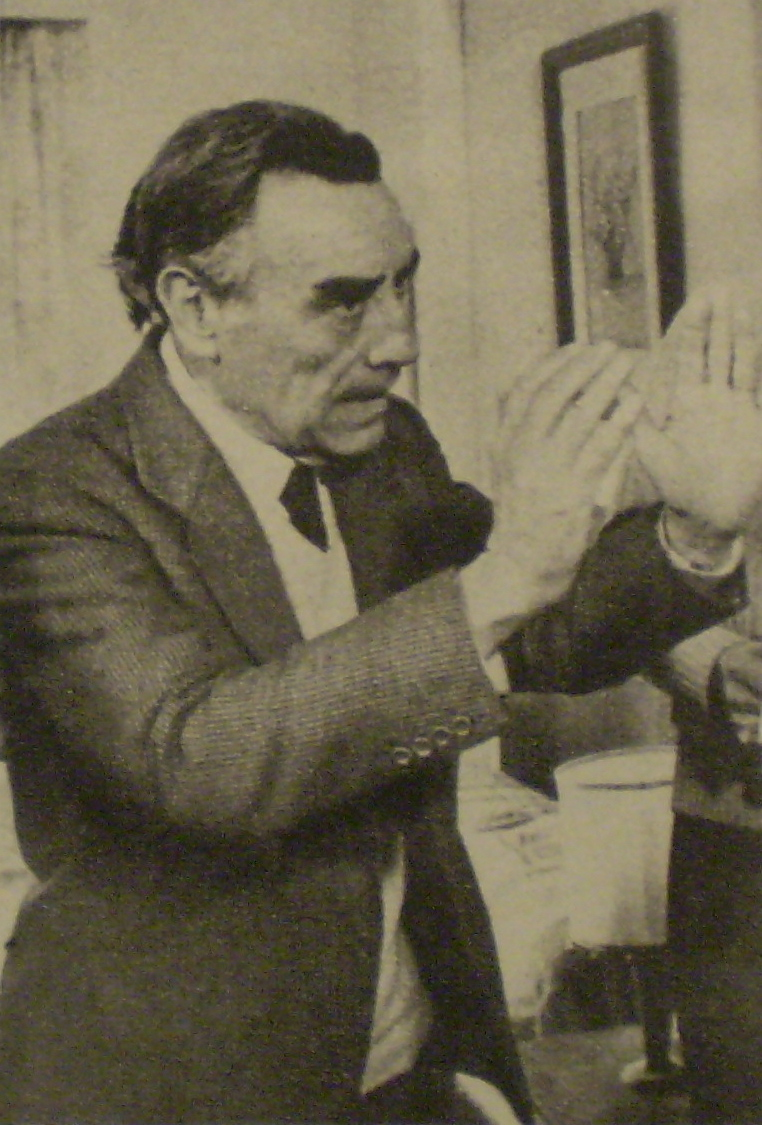

Enrique Cahen Salaberry (born 12 October 1911 – 29 June 1991 in Buenos Aires) was a prolific Argentine film director whose career in the Cinema of Argentina as a movie director spanned five decades. He is a notable director of the Golden Age of Argentine cinema.

He directed some 60 films between 1943 and 1986 such as Cuidado Con Las Mujeres in 1951, winning a Premio ACE Award Best Cinema Director in 1971.

== Filmography ==
Assistant director

- Crimen a las 3 (1935)
- Escala en la ciudad (1935)
- La fuga (1937)
- Puerta cerrada (1938)
- Nace un amor (1938)
- The Life of Carlos Gardel (1939)
- El Loco Serenata (1939)
- La casa del recuerdo (1939)
- Napoleón (1941)
- Orquesta de señoritas (1941)
- The Song of the Suburbs (1941)
- Soñar no cuesta nada (1941)
- Bajó un ángel del cielo (1942)
- El profesor Cero (1942)
- La mentirosa (1942)
- Claro de luna (1942)
- El tercer beso (1942)
- Son cartas de amor (1943)

Director

- Su hermana menor (1943)
- Su esposa diurna (1944)
- El Capitán Pérez (1946)
- Lauracha (1946)
- Un ángel sin pantalones (1947)
- Rodríguez supernumerario (1948)
- Recuerdos de un ángel (1948)
- Avivato (1948)
- El ladrón canta boleros (1950)
- Don Fulgencio (1950)
- El heroico Bonifacio (1951)
- Cuidado con las mujeres (1951)
- Concierto de bastón (1951)
- Especialista en señoras (1951)
- Mi mujer está loca (1952)
- El infortunado Fortunato (1952)
- End of the Month (1953)
- Sucedió en Buenos Aires (1954)
- Mi viudo y yo (1954)
- En carne viva (1955)
- La dama del millón (1956)
- Enigma de mujer (1956)
- El bote, el río y la gente (1960)
- El turista (1963)
- Psique y sexo (1965)
- Cómo te extraño (1966)
- El Galleguito de la cara sucia (1966)
- La muchachada de abordo (1966)
- Story of a Poor Young Man (1968)
- El día que me quieras (1969)
- En una playa junto al mar (1971)
- El caradura y la millonaria (1971)
- Las píldoras (1972)
- Papá Corazón se quiere casar (1974)
- Hay que romper la rutina (1974)
- Mi novia el… (1975)
- Maridos en vacaciones (1975)
- El gordo de América (1976)
- Los hombres piensan en eso (1976)
- Jacinta Pichimahuida (1977)
- Las turistas quieren guerra (1977)
- Yo también tengo fiaca (1978)
- Donde duermen dos duermen tres (1979)
- Gran Valor (1981)
- Los piolas no se casan (1981)
- Gran valor en la facultad de medicina (1981)
- Mingo y Aníbal, dos pelotazos en contra (1984)
- Las Aventuras de Tremendo (1986)
