= List of Miss Universe titleholders =

List of Miss Universe winners (1952–present)

This is a list of Miss Universe titleholders since the inaugural edition of the competition in 1952 to the present.

== Titleholders ==
This list includes the name, age, country or territory, and hometown of each titleholder of Miss Universe since the inaugural edition of the competition in 1952.

Year	Country/Territory	Titleholder	Age (Note: Ages at time of Miss Universe.)	Hometown	National title	Date	Entrants
1952	Finland	Armi Kuusela (Note: Relinquished her title as Miss Universe 1952 shortly before her reign was scheduled to end to marry Filipino businessman, Virgilio Hilario, on May 4, 1953. Despite this, her resignation was not made official by the Miss Universe Organization.)	17	Muhos	Suomen Neito 1952	28 June 1952	30
1953	France	Christiane Martel	18	Créteil	Miss Cinémonde 1953	17 July 1953	26
1954	United States	Miriam Stevenson	21	Winnsboro	Miss USA 1954	24 July 1954	33
1955	Sweden	Hillevi Rombin	21	Uppsala	Fröken Sverige 1955	22 July 1955	33
1956	United States	Carol Morris	20	Ottumwa	Miss USA 1956	20 July 1956	30
1957	Peru	Gladys Zender	17	Lima	Miss Perú 1957	19 July 1957	32
1958	Colombia	Luz Marina Zuluaga	19	Pereira	Virreina Colombia 1957	26 July 1958	36
1959	Japan	Akiko Kojima	22	Tokyo	Miss Japan 1959	24 July 1959	34
1960	United States	Linda Bement	18	Salt Lake City	Miss USA 1960	9 July 1960	43
1961	Germany	Marlene Schmidt	23	Stuttgart	Miss Germany 1961	15 July 1961	48
1962	Argentina	Norma Nolan	24	Venado Tuerto	Miss Argentina 1962	14 July 1962	52
1963	Brazil	Iêda Maria Vargas	18	Porto Alegre	Miss Brasil 1963	20 July 1963	50
1964	Greece	Corinna Tsopei	20	Athens	Star Hellas 1964	1 August 1964	60
1965	Thailand	Apasra Hongsakula	18	Bangkok	Miss Thailand 1964	24 July 1965	56
1966	Sweden	Margareta Arvidsson	18	Gothenburg	Fröken Sverige 1966	16 July 1966	58
1967	United States	Sylvia Hitchcock	21	Miami	Miss USA 1967	15 July 1967	56
1968	Brazil	Martha Vasconcellos	20	Salvador	Miss Brasil 1968	13 July 1968	65
1969	Philippines	Gloria Diaz	18	Aringay	Binibining Pilipinas Universe 1969	19 July 1969	61
1970	Puerto Rico	Marisol Malaret	20	San Juan	Miss Puerto Rico 1970	11 July 1970	64
1971	Lebanon	Georgina Rizk	18	Beirut	Miss Lebanon 1970	24 July 1971	60
1972	Australia	Kerry Anne Wells	20	Perth	Dream Girl Miss Australia 1972	29 July 1972	61
1973	Philippines	Margie Moran	19	Manila	Binibining Pilipinas Universe 1973	21 July 1973	61
1974	Spain	Amparo Muñoz (Note: Resigned)	20	Vélez-Málaga	Miss España 1973	19 July 1974	65
1975	Finland	Anne Pohtamo	19	Helsinki	Miss Suomi 1975	19 July 1975	71
1976	Israel	Rina Messinger	20	Kiryat Tiv'on	Miss Israel 1976	11 July 1976	72
1977	Trinidad and Tobago	Janelle Commissiong	24	Port of Spain	Miss Trinidad and Tobago 1977	16 July 1977	80
1978	South Africa	Margaret Gardiner	18	Cape Town	Miss Republic of South Africa 1978	24 July 1978	75
1979	Venezuela	Maritza Sayalero	18	Caracas	Miss Venezuela 1979	20 July 1979	75
1980	United States	Shawn Weatherly	20	Sumter	Miss USA 1980	8 July 1980	69
1981	Venezuela	Irene Sáez	19	Caracas	Miss Venezuela 1981	20 July 1981	76
1982	Canada	Karen Baldwin	18	London	Miss Canada 1982	26 July 1982	77
1983	New Zealand	Lorraine Downes	19	Auckland	Miss New Zealand 1983	11 July 1983	80
1984	Sweden	Yvonne Ryding	21	Eskilstuna	Fröken Sverige 1984	9 July 1984	81
1985	Puerto Rico	Deborah Carthy Deu	19	San Juan	Miss Puerto Rico 1985	15 July 1985	79
1986	Venezuela	Bárbara Palacios	22	Caracas	Miss Venezuela 1986	21 July 1986	77
1987	Chile	Cecilia Bolocco	22	Santiago	Miss Chile 1987	27 May 1987	68
1988	Thailand	Porntip Nakhirunkanok	19	Bangkok	Miss Thailand 1988	24 May 1988	66
1989	Netherlands	Angela Visser	22	Rotterdam	Miss Holland 1988	23 May 1989	76
1990	Norway	Mona Grudt	19	Trondheim	Norske Miss Universe 1990	15 April 1990	71
1991	Mexico	Lupita Jones	23	Mexicali	Señorita México 1990	17 May 1991	73
1992	Namibia	Michelle McLean	19	Windhoek	Miss Namibia 1991	9 May 1992	78
1993	Puerto Rico	Dayanara Torres	18	Toa Alta	Miss Puerto Rico 1993	21 May 1993	79
1994	India	Sushmita Sen	18	New Delhi	Femina Miss India 1994	21 May 1994	77
1995	United States	Chelsi Smith	21	Deer Park	Miss USA 1995	12 May 1995	82
1996	Venezuela	Alicia Machado	19	Maracay	Miss Venezuela 1995	17 May 1996	79
1997	United States	Brook Lee	26	Pearl City	Miss USA 1997	16 May 1997	74
1998	Trinidad and Tobago	Wendy Fitzwilliam	25	Diego Martin	Miss Trinidad and Tobago 1998	12 May 1998	81
1999	Botswana	Mpule Kwelagobe	19	Gaborone	Miss Universe Botswana 1999	26 May 1999	84
2000	India	Lara Dutta	22	Bengaluru	Femina Miss India 2000	12 May 2000	79
2001	Puerto Rico	Denise Quiñones	20	Lares	Miss Puerto Rico Universe 2001	11 May 2001	77
2002	Russia	Oxana Fedorova (Note: Terminated)	24	Pskov	Miss Russia 2001	29 May 2002	75
2002	Panama	Justine Pasek (Note: Originally placed as 1st Runner-Up. Assumed title after original winner was terminated.)	23	Panama City	Señorita Panamá 2001	24 September 2002	73
2003	Dominican Republic	Amelia Vega	18	Santiago	Miss República Dominicana 2002	3 June 2003	71
2004	Australia	Jennifer Hawkins	20	Newcastle	Miss Universe Australia 2004	1 June 2004	80
2005	Canada	Natalie Glebova	23	Toronto	Miss Universe Canada 2005	31 May 2005	81
2006	Puerto Rico	Zuleyka Rivera	18	Salinas	Miss Puerto Rico Universe 2006	23 July 2006	86
2007	Japan	Riyo Mori	20	Shizuoka	Miss Universe Japan 2007	28 May 2007	77
2008	Venezuela	Dayana Mendoza	22	Caracas	Miss Venezuela 2007	14 July 2008	80
2009	Venezuela	Stefanía Fernández	18	Mérida	Miss Venezuela 2008	23 August 2009	83
2010	Mexico	Ximena Navarrete	22	Guadalajara	Nuestra Belleza México 2009	23 August 2010	83
2011	Angola	Leila Lopes	25	Benguela	Miss Angola 2010	12 September 2011	89
2012	United States	Olivia Culpo	20	Cranston	Miss USA 2012	19 December 2012	89
2013	Venezuela	Gabriela Isler	25	Valencia	Miss Venezuela 2012	9 November 2013	86
2014	Colombia	Paulina Vega	22	Barranquilla	Señorita Colombia 2013	25 January 2015	88
2015	Philippines	Pia Wurtzbach (Note: During the live telecast, at first, Miss Colombia 2014 Ariadna Gutiérrez was first announced as the winner due to an announcement mistake by Steve Harvey. Once Harvey apologized to the audience, Gutiérrez was announced as the 1st Runner-Up, and Pia Wurtzbach as the winner.)	26	Cagayan de Oro	Miss Universe Philippines 2015	20 December 2015	80
2016	France	Iris Mittenaere	24	Lille	Miss France 2016	30 January 2017	86
2017	South Africa	Demi-Leigh Nel-Peters	22	Sedgefield	Miss South Africa 2017	26 November 2017	92
2018	Philippines	Catriona Gray	24	Oas	Miss Universe Philippines 2018	17 December 2018	94
2019	South Africa	Zozibini Tunzi	26	Tsolo	Miss South Africa 2019	8 December 2019	90
2020	Mexico	Andrea Meza	26	Chihuahua City	Mexicana Universal 2020	16 May 2021	74
2021	India	Harnaaz Sandhu	21	Chandigarh	Miss Diva Universe 2021	13 December 2021	80
2022	United States	R'Bonney Gabriel	28	Houston	Miss USA 2022	14 January 2023	83
2023	Nicaragua	Sheynnis Palacios	23	Diriamba	Miss Nicaragua 2023	18 November 2023	84
2024	Denmark	Victoria Kjær Theilvig	21	Herlev	Miss Universe Denmark 2024 (Note: Victoria Kjær Theilvig had placed as the second runner-up at Miss Denmark 2021, and was later appointed by the organization as Miss Universe Denmark 2024 when the winner of Miss Denmark 2024 declined to compete.)	16 November 2024	125
2025	Mexico	Fátima Bosch	25	Teapa	Miss Universe Mexico 2025	21 November 2025	118

== Titleholders by country or territory ==
This list includes the titleholders of Miss Universe by country or territory in ascending order.

Country or territory	Titles	Year(s)
United States	9	1954, 1956, 1960, 1967, 1980, 1995, 1997, 2012, 2022
Venezuela	7	1979, 1981, 1986, 1996, 2008, 2009, 2013
Puerto Rico	5	1970, 1985, 1993, 2001, 2006
Mexico	4	1991, 2010, 2020, 2025
Philippines	4	1969, 1973, 2015, 2018
India	3	1994, 2000, 2021
South Africa	3	1978, 2017, 2019
Sweden	3	1955, 1966, 1984
France	2	1953, 2016
Colombia	2	1958, 2014
Japan	2	1959, 2007
Canada	2	1982, 2005
Australia	2	1972, 2004
Trinidad and Tobago	2	1977, 1998
Thailand	2	1965, 1988
Finland	2	1952, 1975
Brazil	2	1963, 1968
Denmark	1	2024
Nicaragua	1	2023
Angola	1	2011
Dominican Republic	1	2003
Panama	1	2002
Botswana	1	1999
Namibia	1	1992
Norway	1	1990
Netherlands	1	1989
Chile	1	1987
New Zealand	1	1983
Israel	1	1976
Spain	1	1974
Lebanon	1	1971
Greece	1	1964
Argentina	1	1962
Germany	1	1961
Peru	1	1957

Assumed wins

Titles assumed following resignations.

Country or territory	Titles	Year(s)
Panama	1	2002

Dethroned wins

Country or territory	Titles	Year(s)
Russia	1	2002

== Titleholders by continents ==
Continent or region	Titles	Years
North America	24	1954, 1956, 1960, 1967, 1970, 1977, 1980, 1982, 1985, 1991, 1993, 1995, 1997, 1998, 2001, 2003, 2005, 2006, 2010, 2012, 2020, 2022, 2023, 2025
South America	15	1957, 1958, 1962, 1963, 1968, 1979, 1981, 1986, 1987, 1996, 2002, 2008, 2009, 2013, 2014
Europe	14	1952, 1953, 1955, 1961, 1964, 1966, 1974, 1975, 1984, 1989, 1990, 2002, 2016, 2024
Asia	13	1959, 1965, 1969, 1971, 1973, 1976, 1988, 1994, 2000, 2007, 2015, 2018, 2021
Africa	6	1978, 1992, 1999, 2011, 2017, 2019
Oceania	3	1972, 1983, 2004

== Titleholder gallery ==
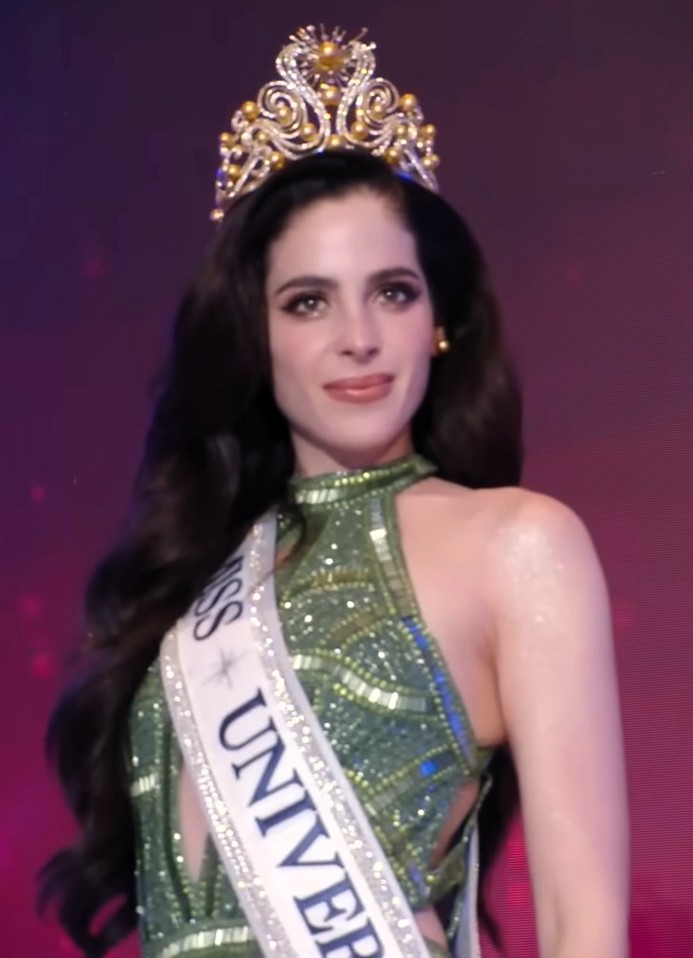
Miss Universe 2025
Fátima Bosch
Mexico

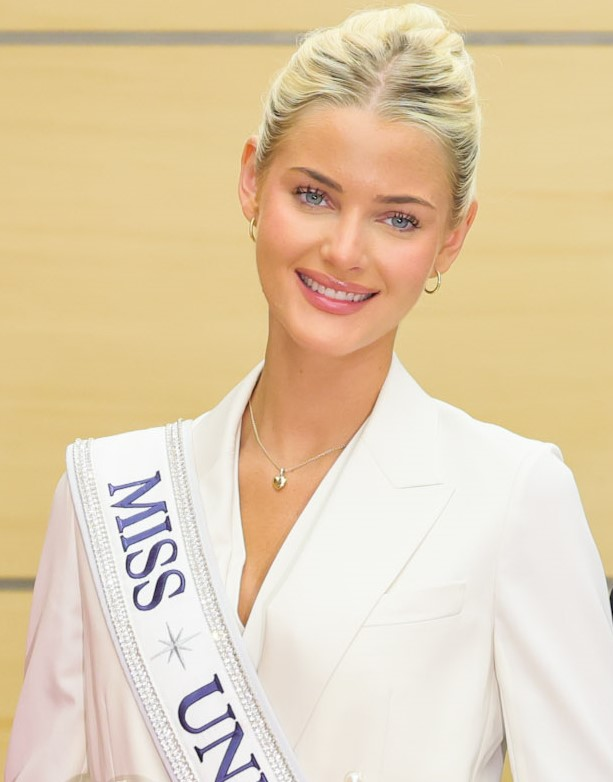
Miss Universe 2024
Victoria Kjær Theilvig
Denmark

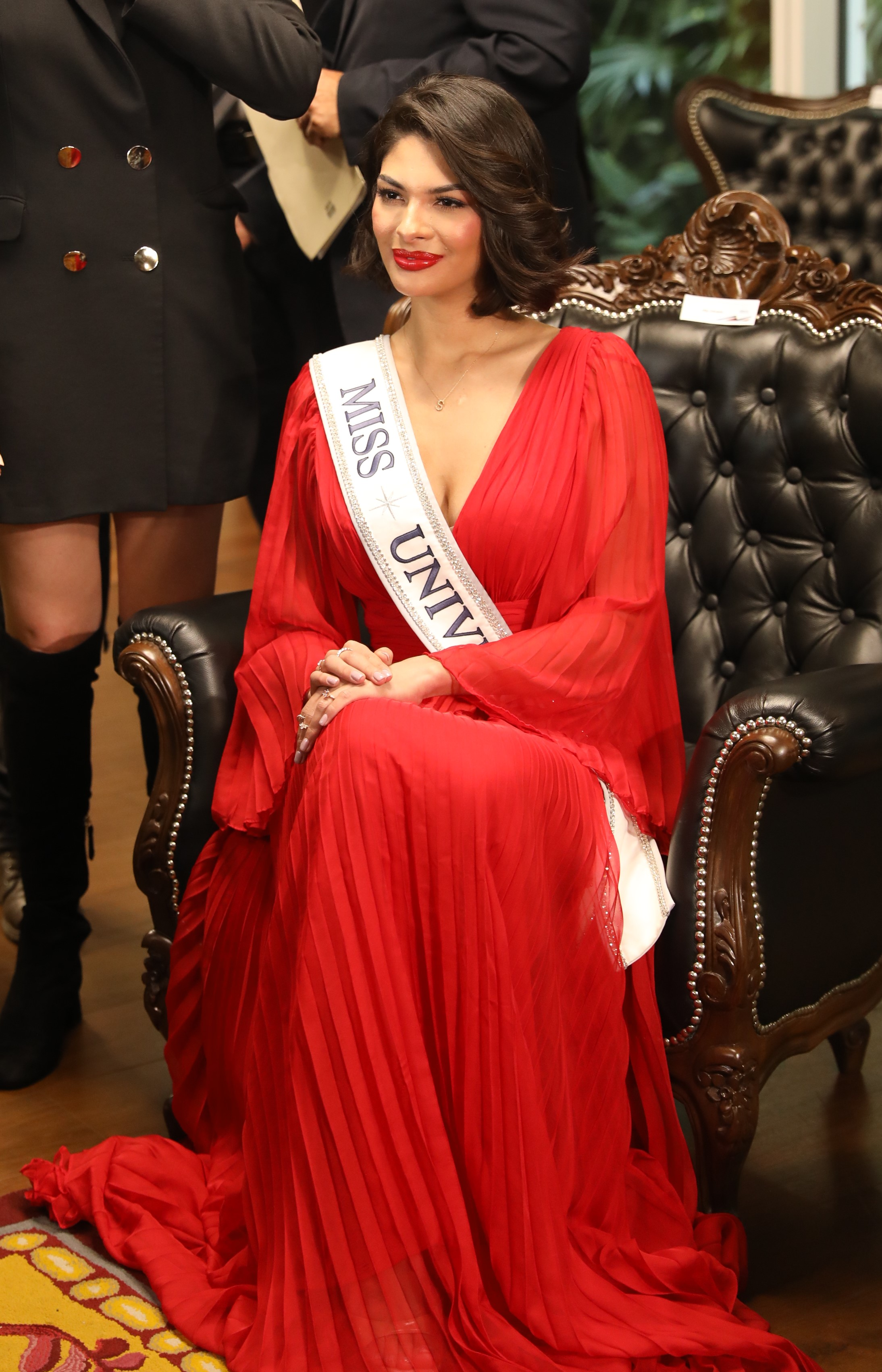
Miss Universe 2023
Sheynnis Palacios
Nicaragua

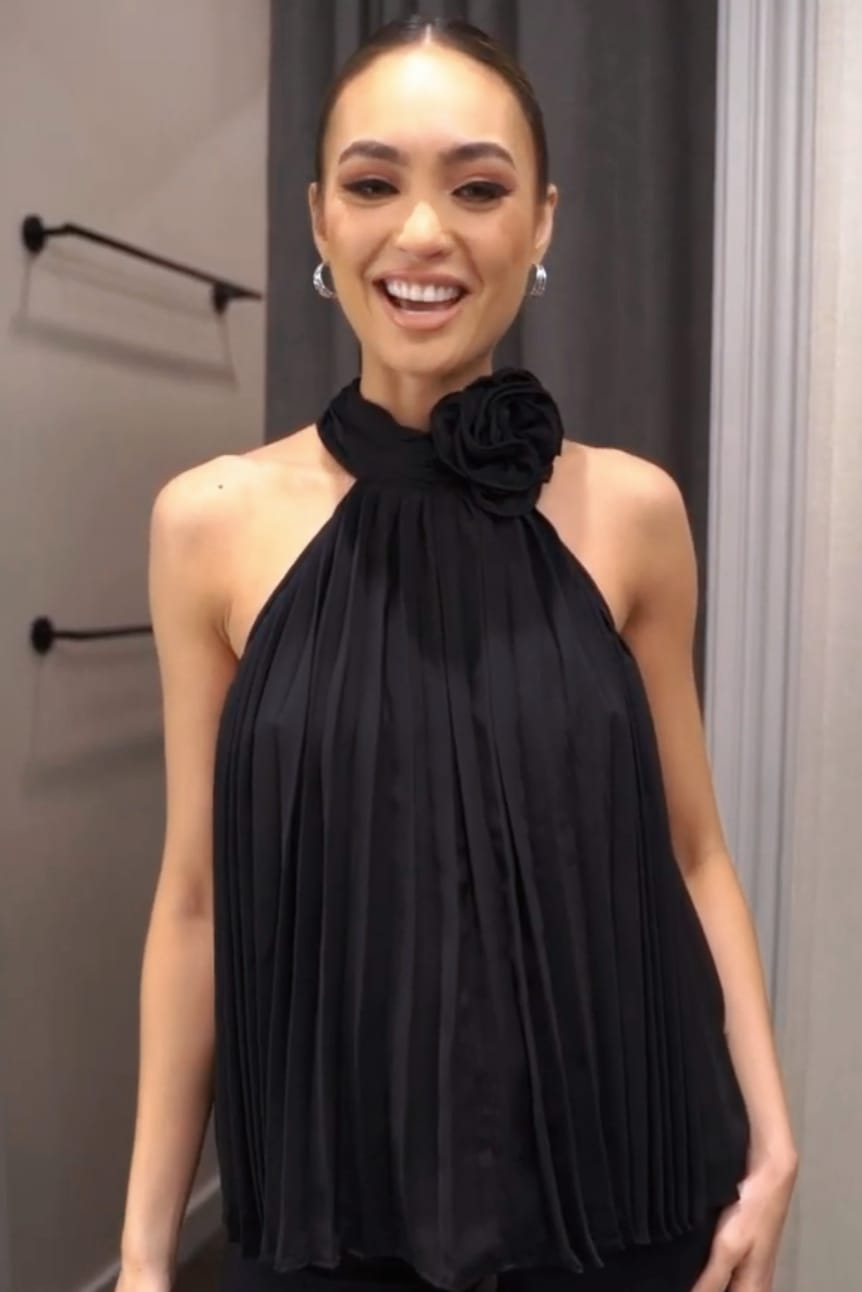
Miss Universe 2022
R'Bonney Gabriel
United States

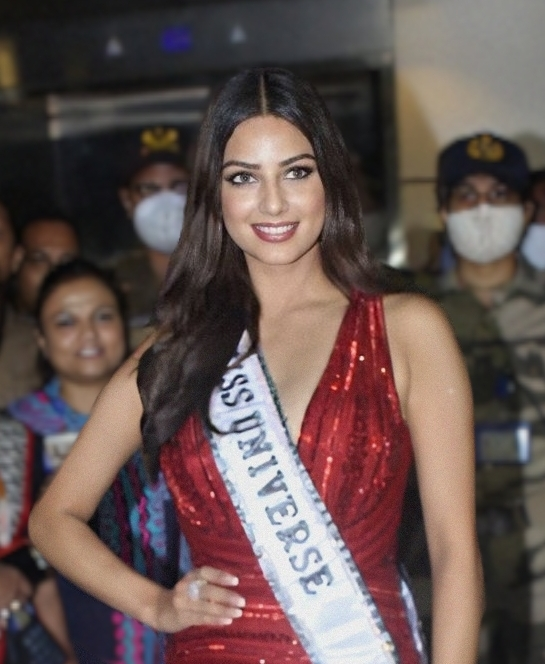
Miss Universe 2021
Harnaaz Sandhu
India

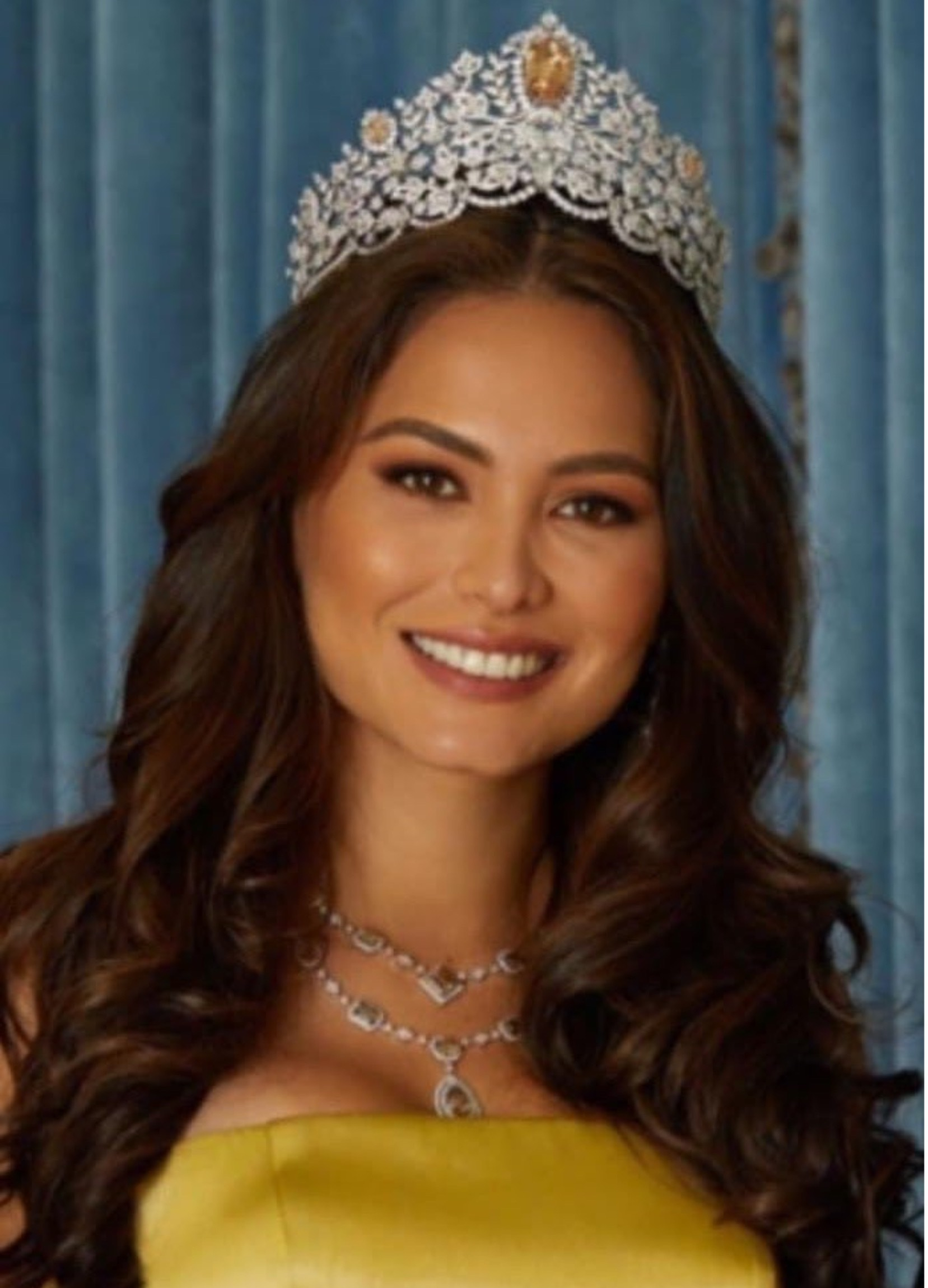
Miss Universe 2020
Andrea Meza
Mexico

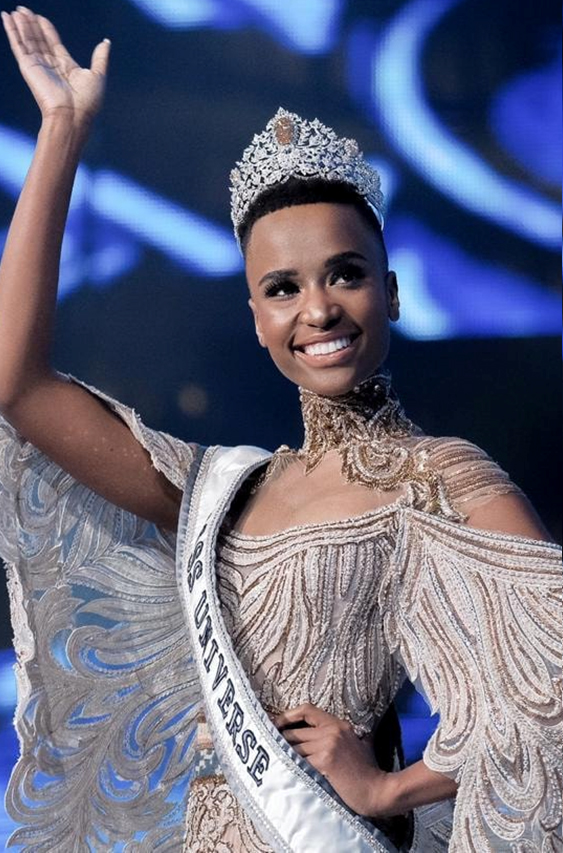
Miss Universe 2019
Zozibini Tunzi
South Africa

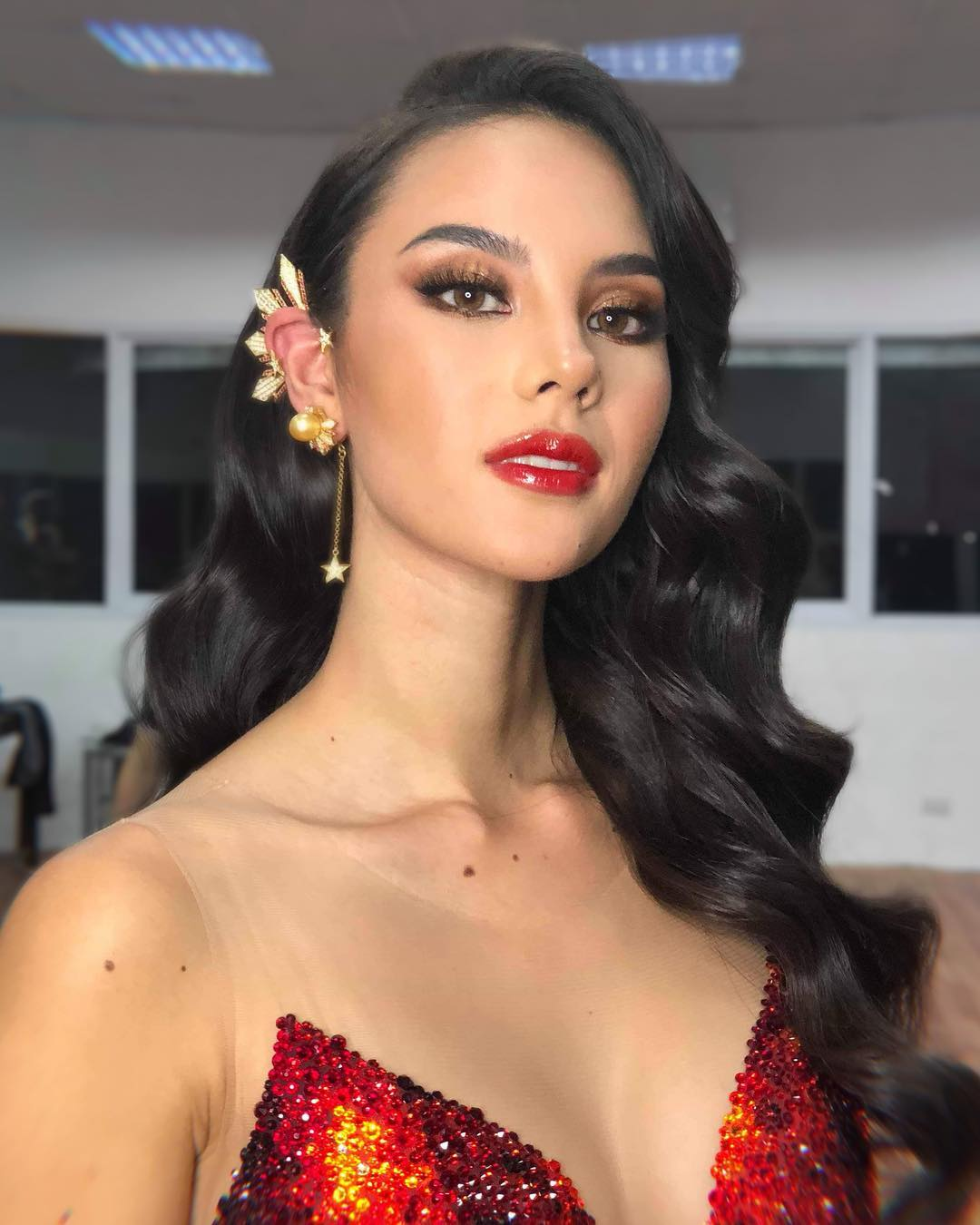
Miss Universe 2018
Catriona Gray
Philippines

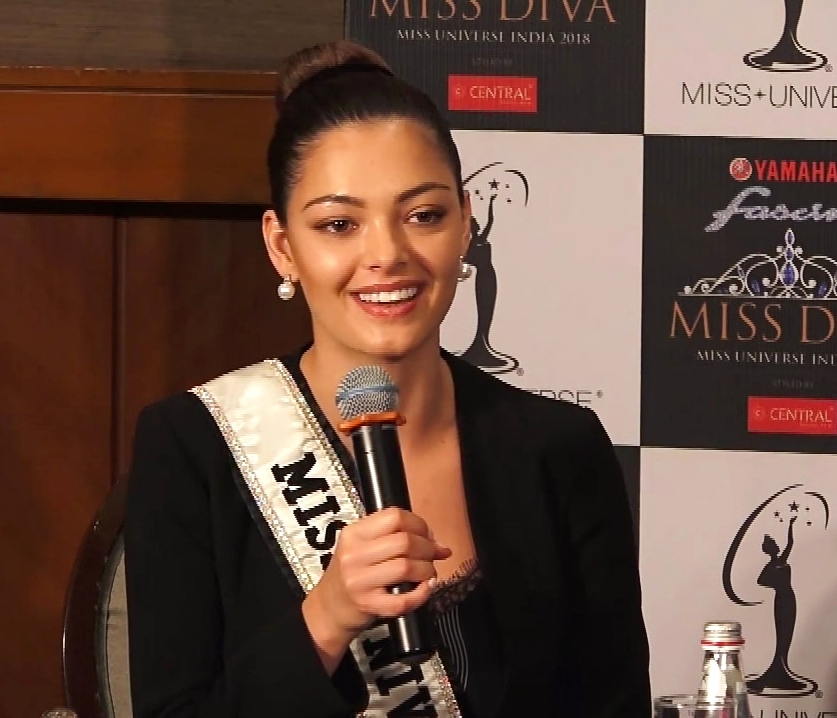
Miss Universe 2017
Demi-Leigh Nel-Peters
South Africa

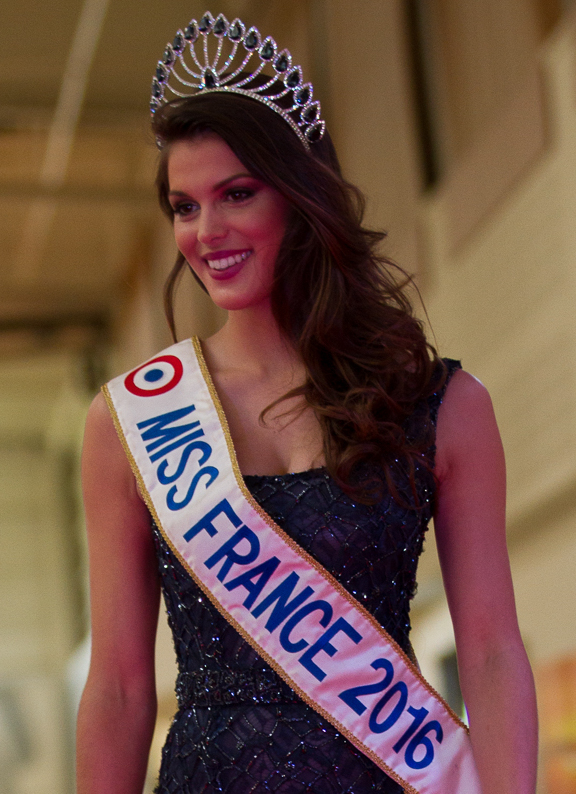
Miss Universe 2016
Iris Mittenaere
France

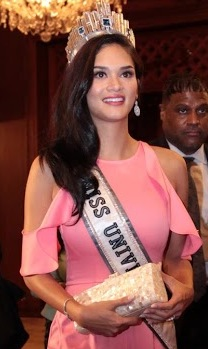
Miss Universe 2015
Pia Wurtzbach
Philippines

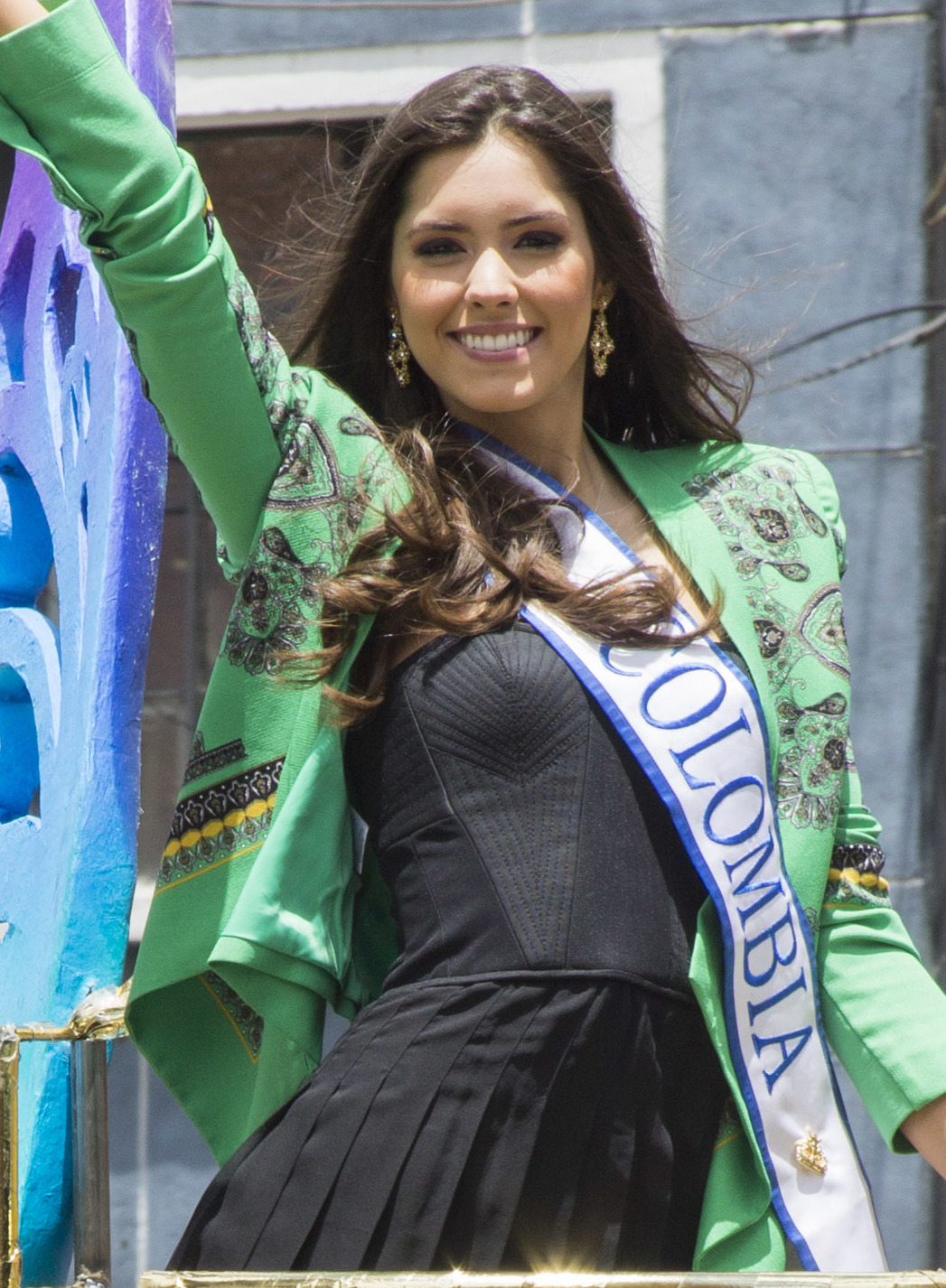
Miss Universe 2014
Paulina Vega
Colombia

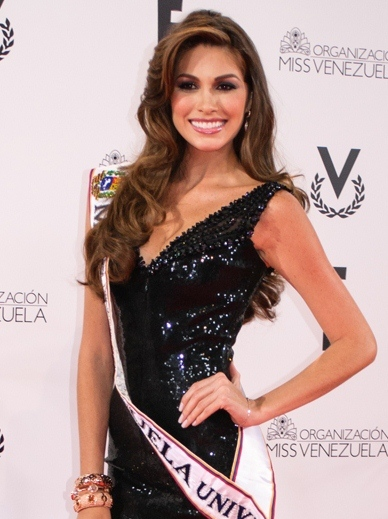
Miss Universe 2013
Gabriela Isler
Venezuela

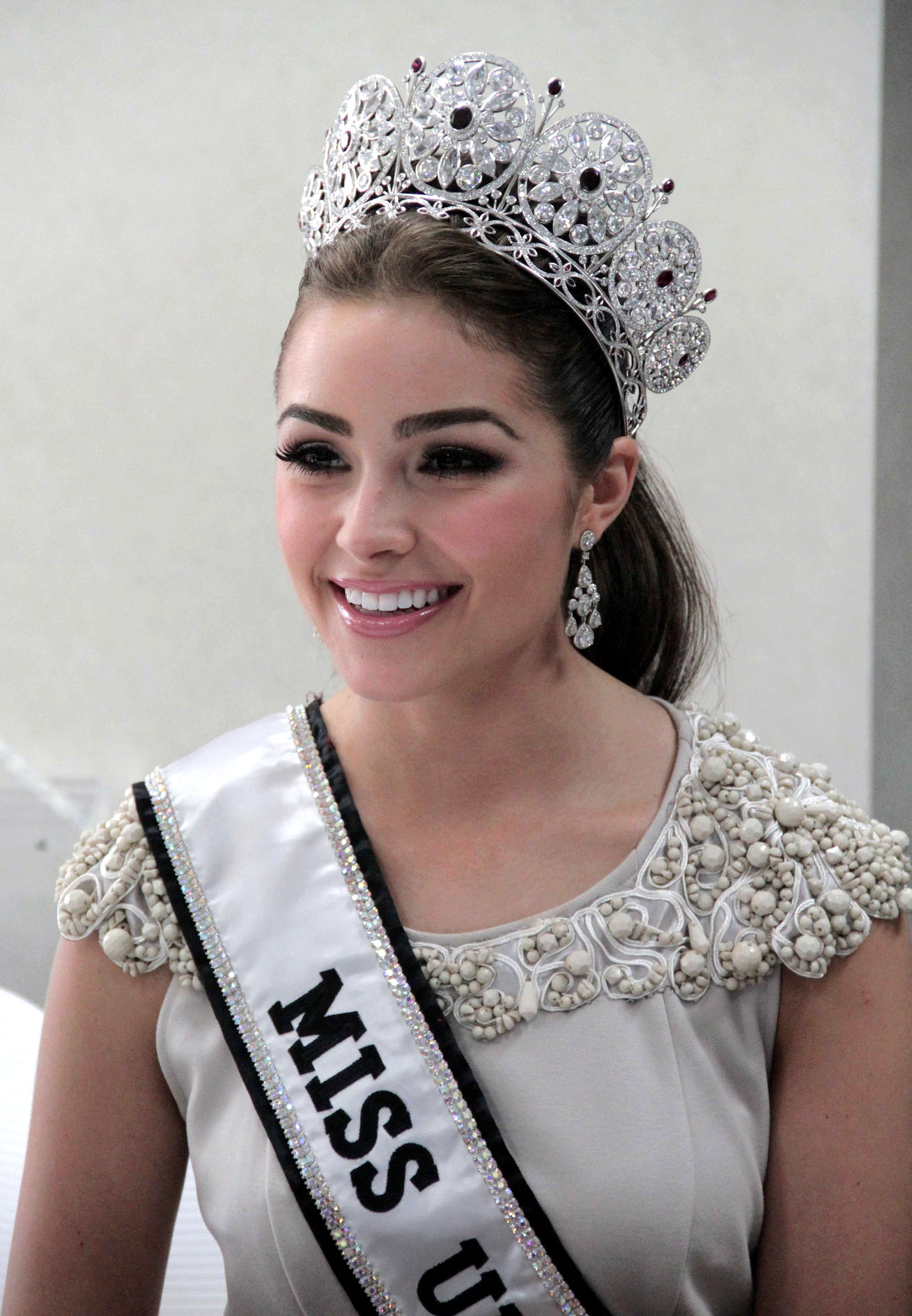
Miss Universe 2012
Olivia Culpo
United States

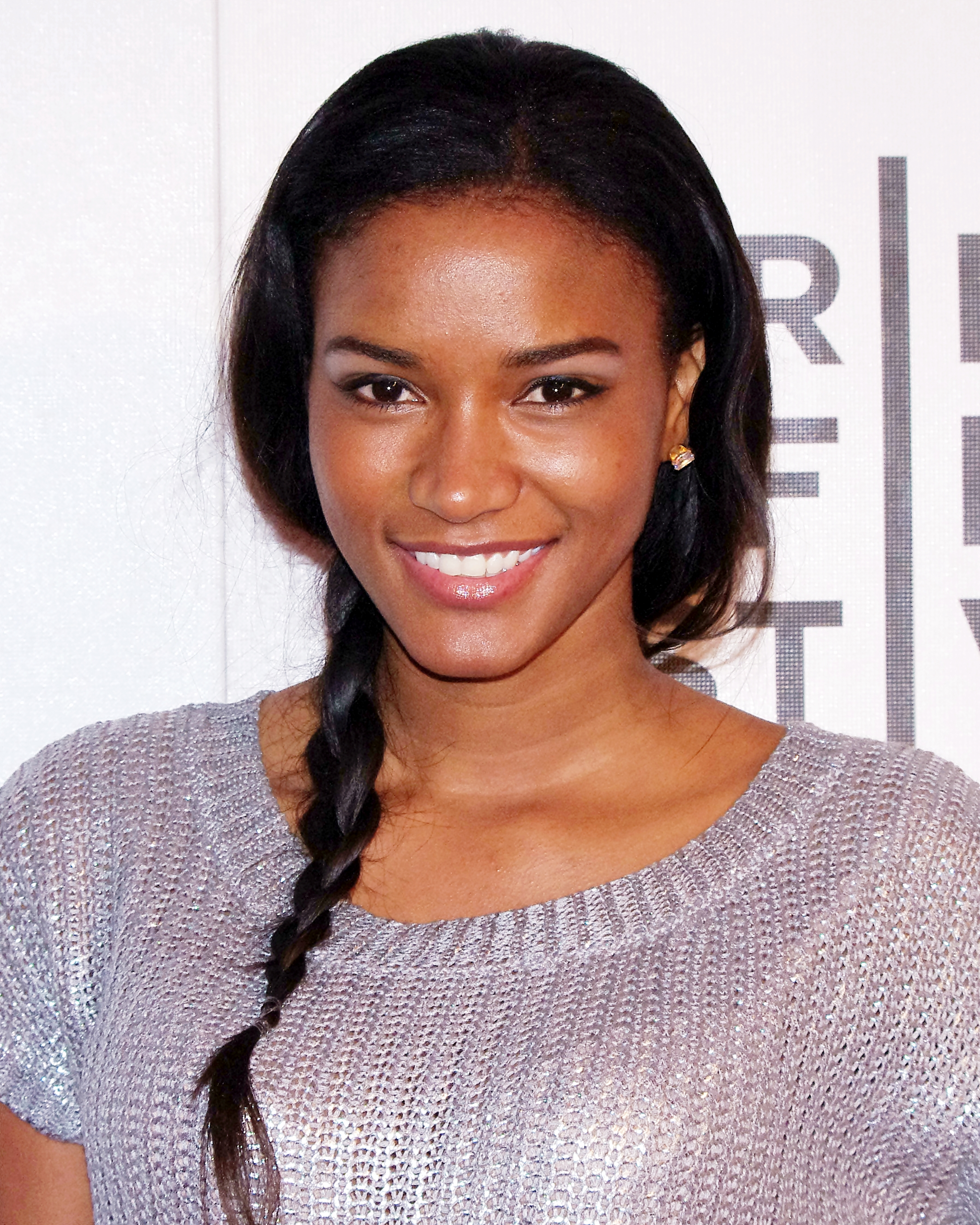
Miss Universe 2011
Leila Lopes
Angola

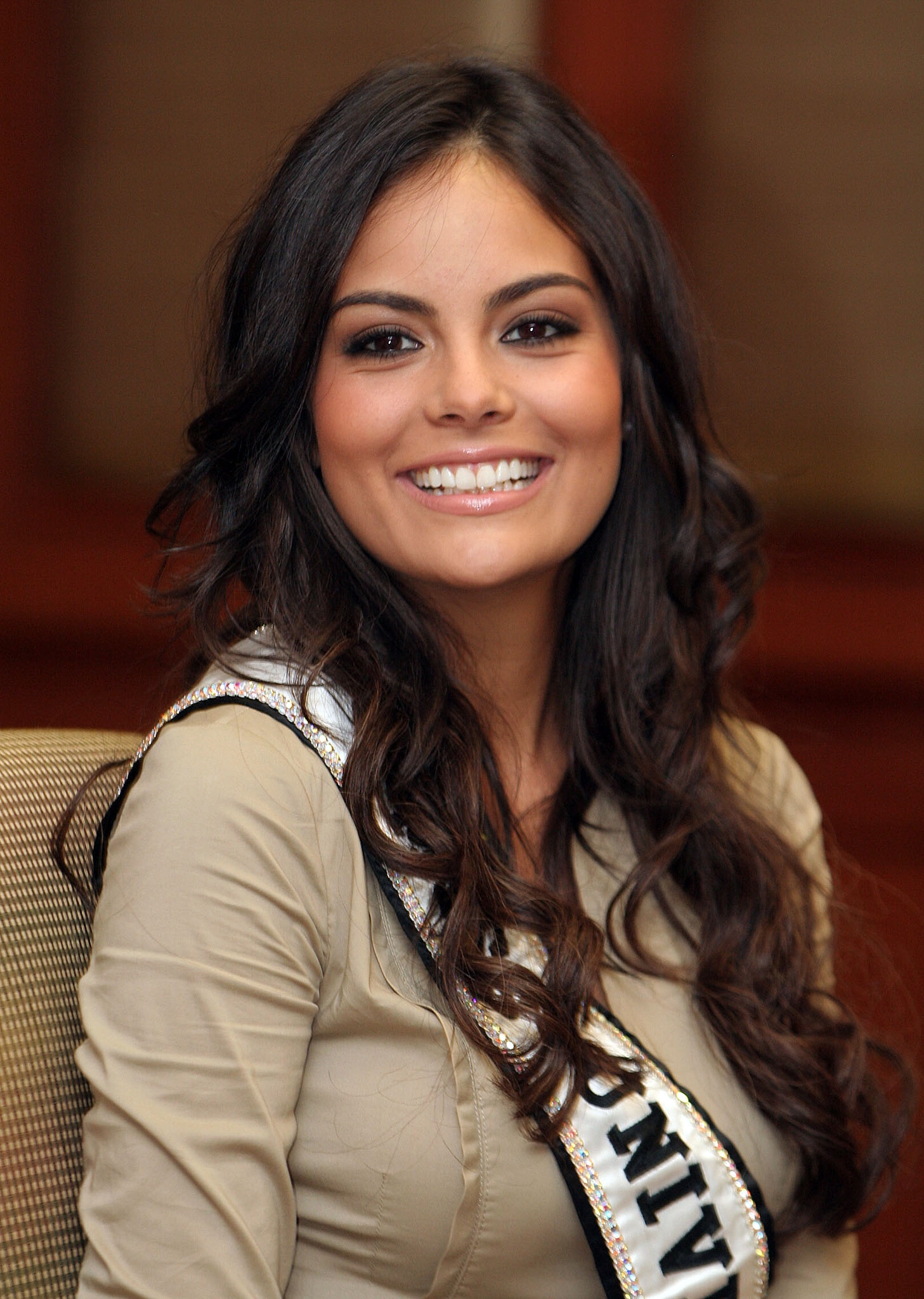
Miss Universe 2010
Ximena Navarrete
Mexico

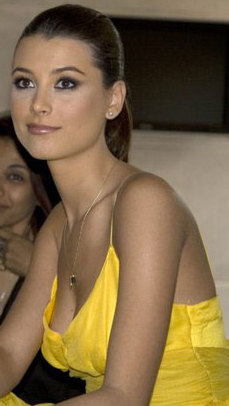
Miss Universe 2009
Stefanía Fernández
Venezuela

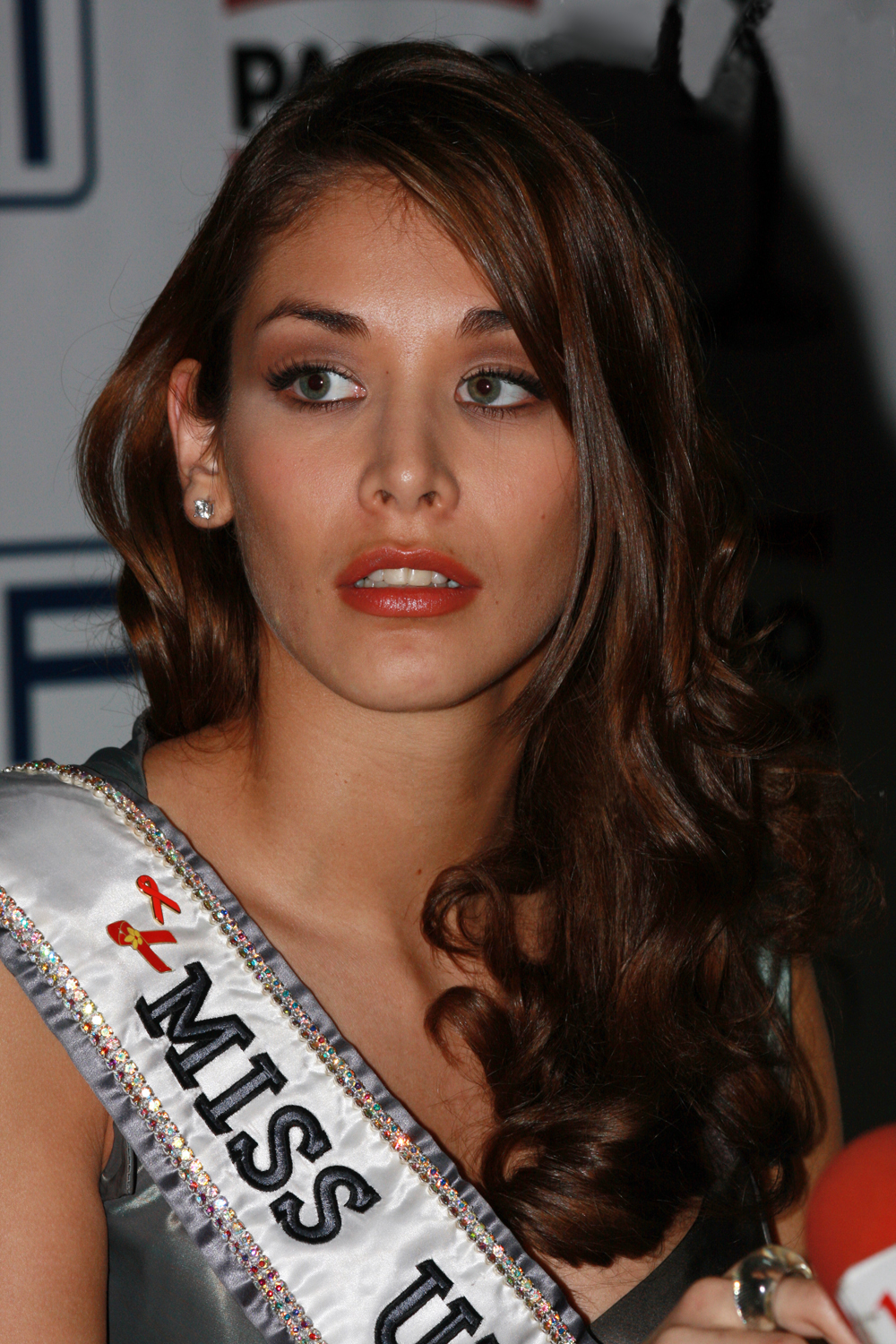
Miss Universe 2008
Dayana Mendoza
Venezuela

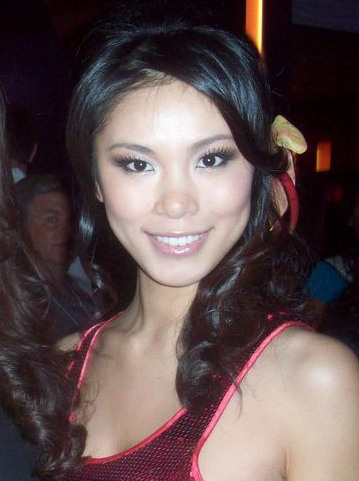
Miss Universe 2007
Riyo Mori
Japan

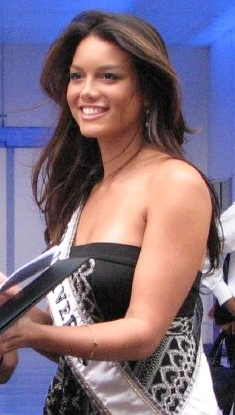
Miss Universe 2006
Zuleyka Rivera
Puerto Rico

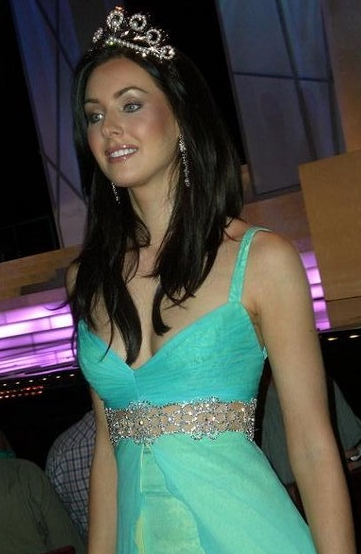
Miss Universe 2005
Natalie Glebova
Canada

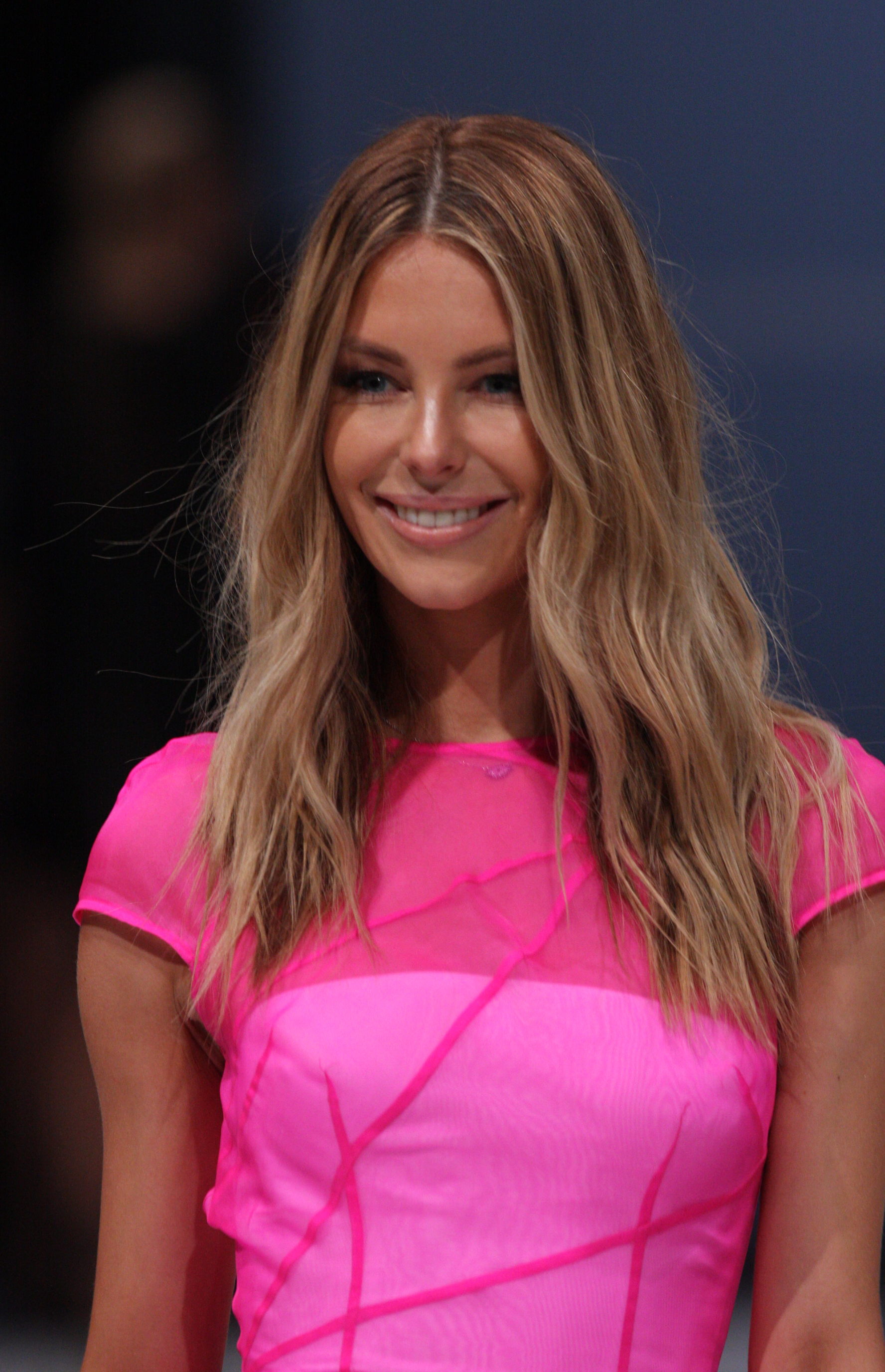
Miss Universe 2004
Jennifer Hawkins
Australia

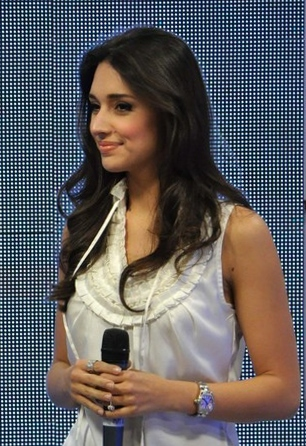
Miss Universe 2003
Amelia Vega
Dominican Republic

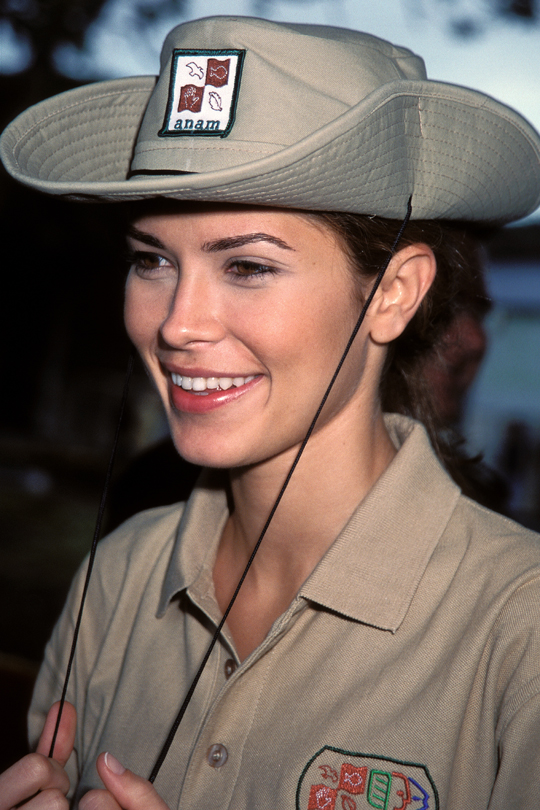
Miss Universe 2002
Justine Pasek
Panama

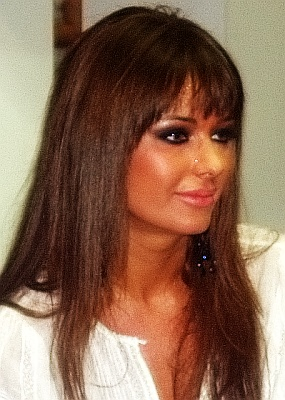
Miss Universe 2002 (dethroned)
Oxana Fedorova
Russia

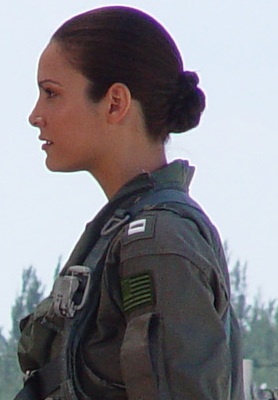
Miss Universe 2001
Denise Quiñones
Puerto Rico

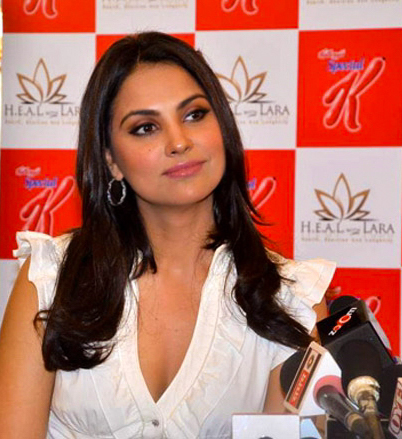
Miss Universe 2000
Lara Dutta
India

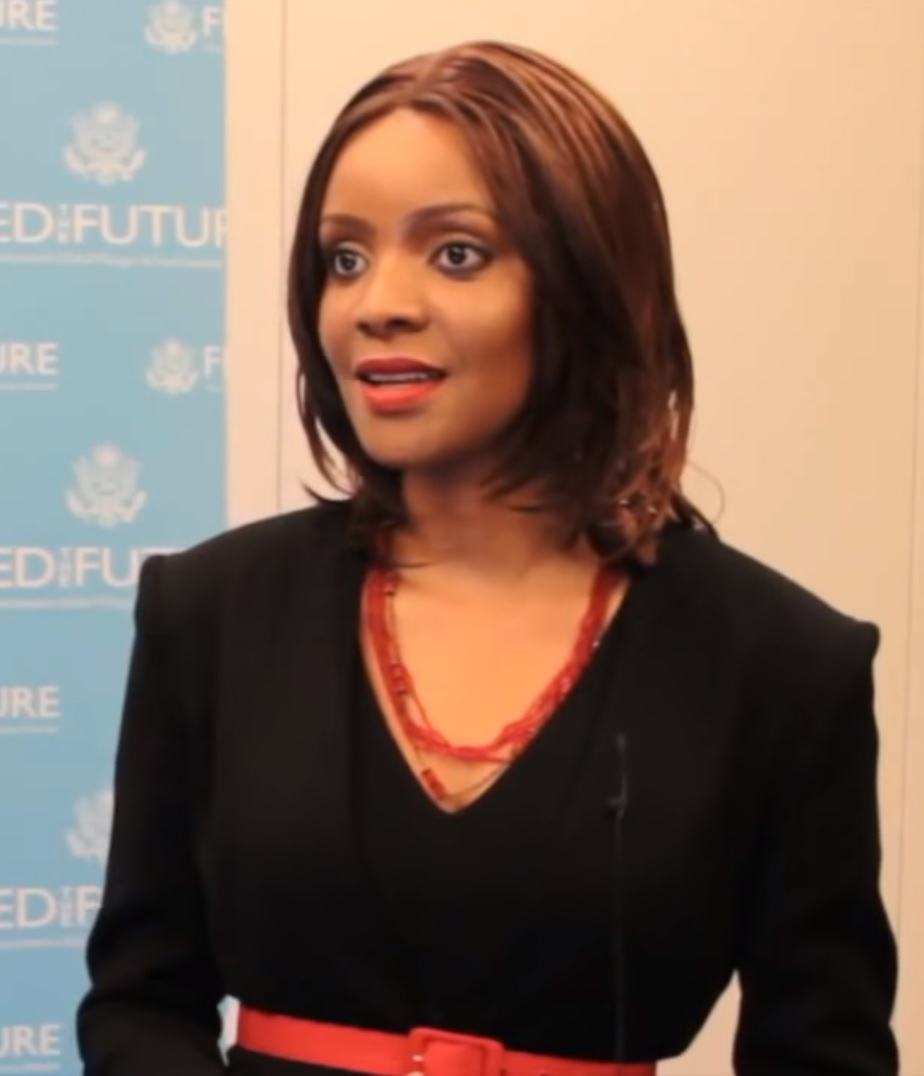
Miss Universe 1999
Mpule Kwelagobe
Botswana

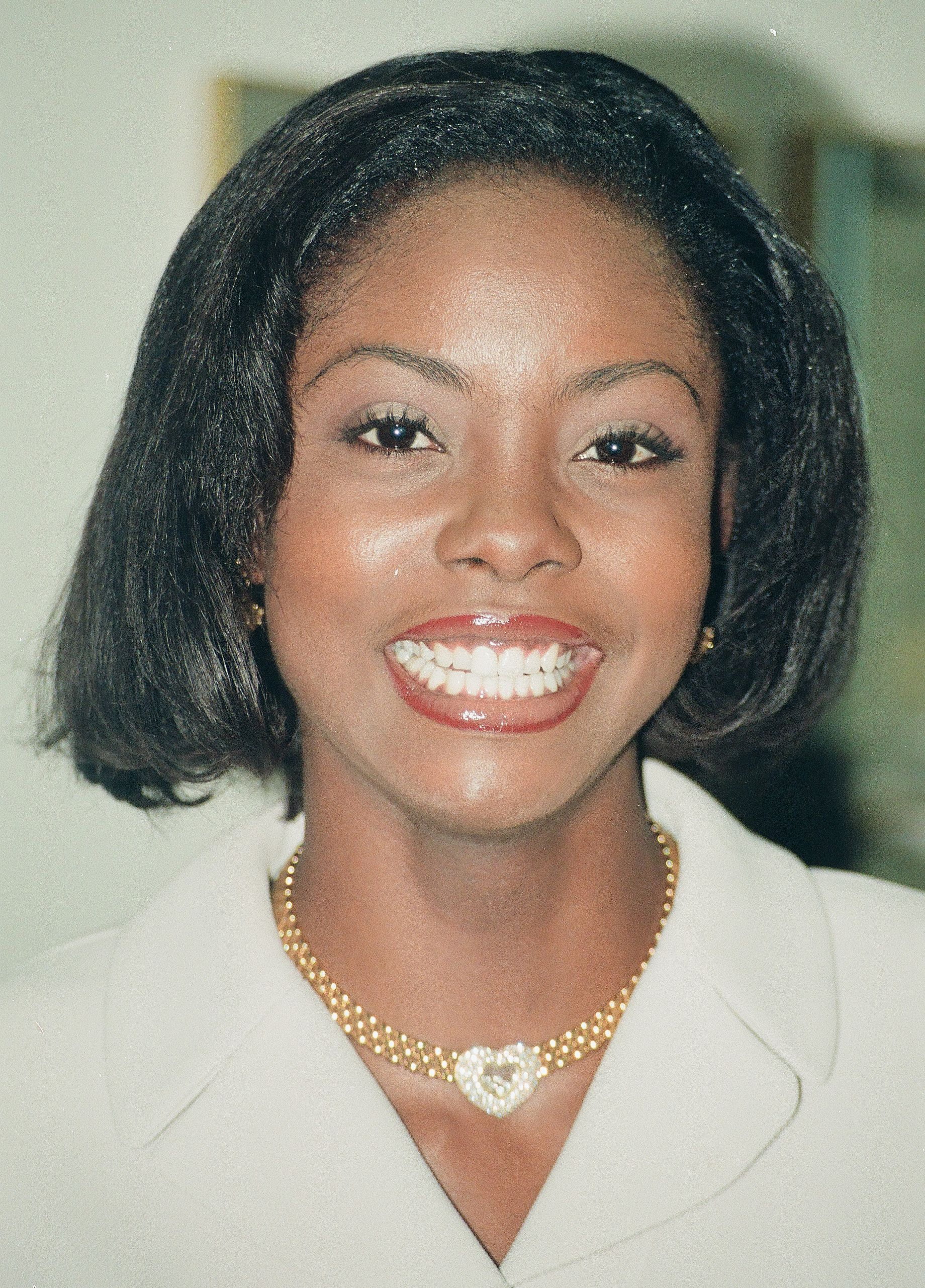
Miss Universe 1998
Wendy Fitzwilliam
Trinidad and Tobago

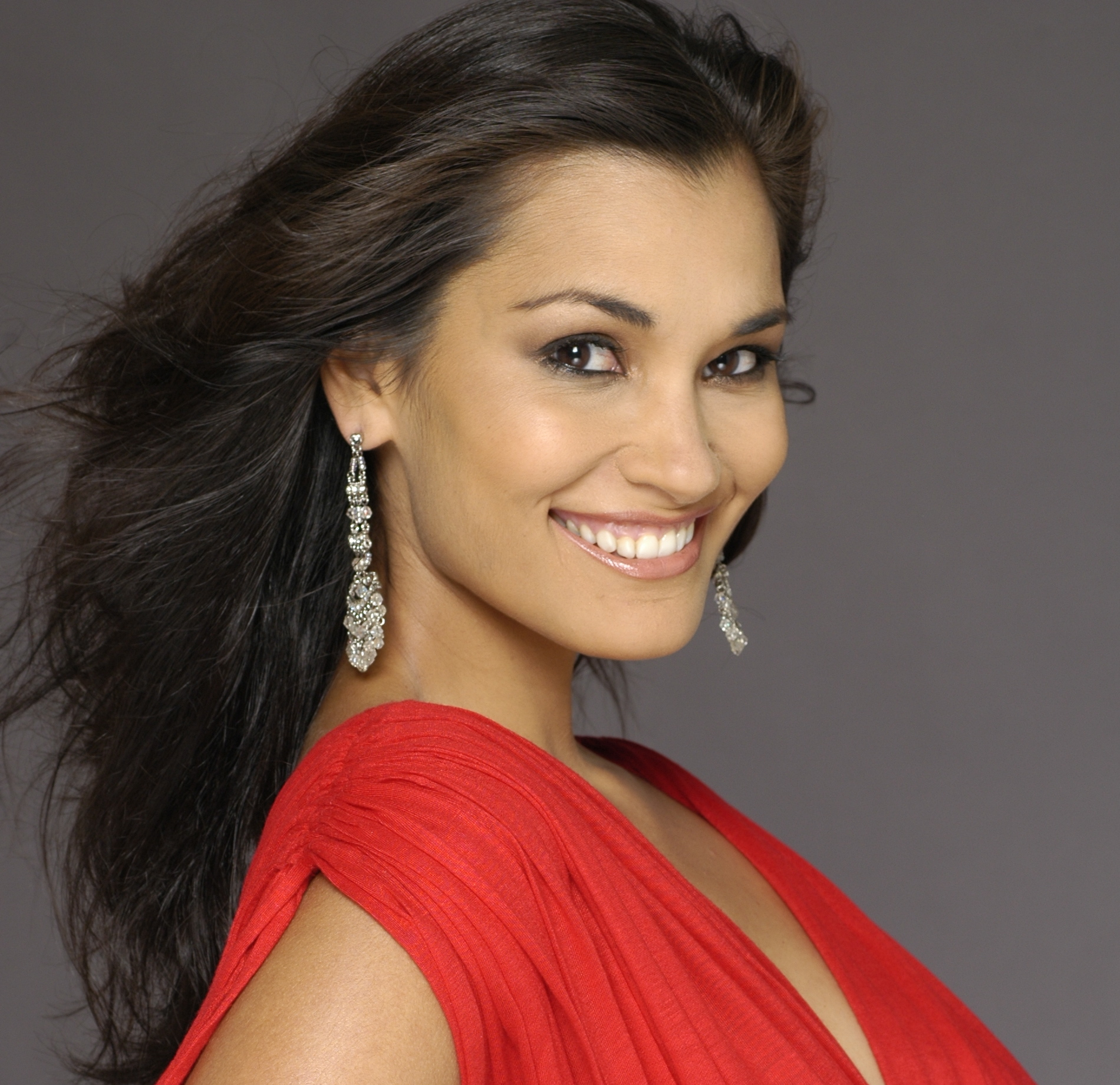
Miss Universe 1997
Brook Lee
United States

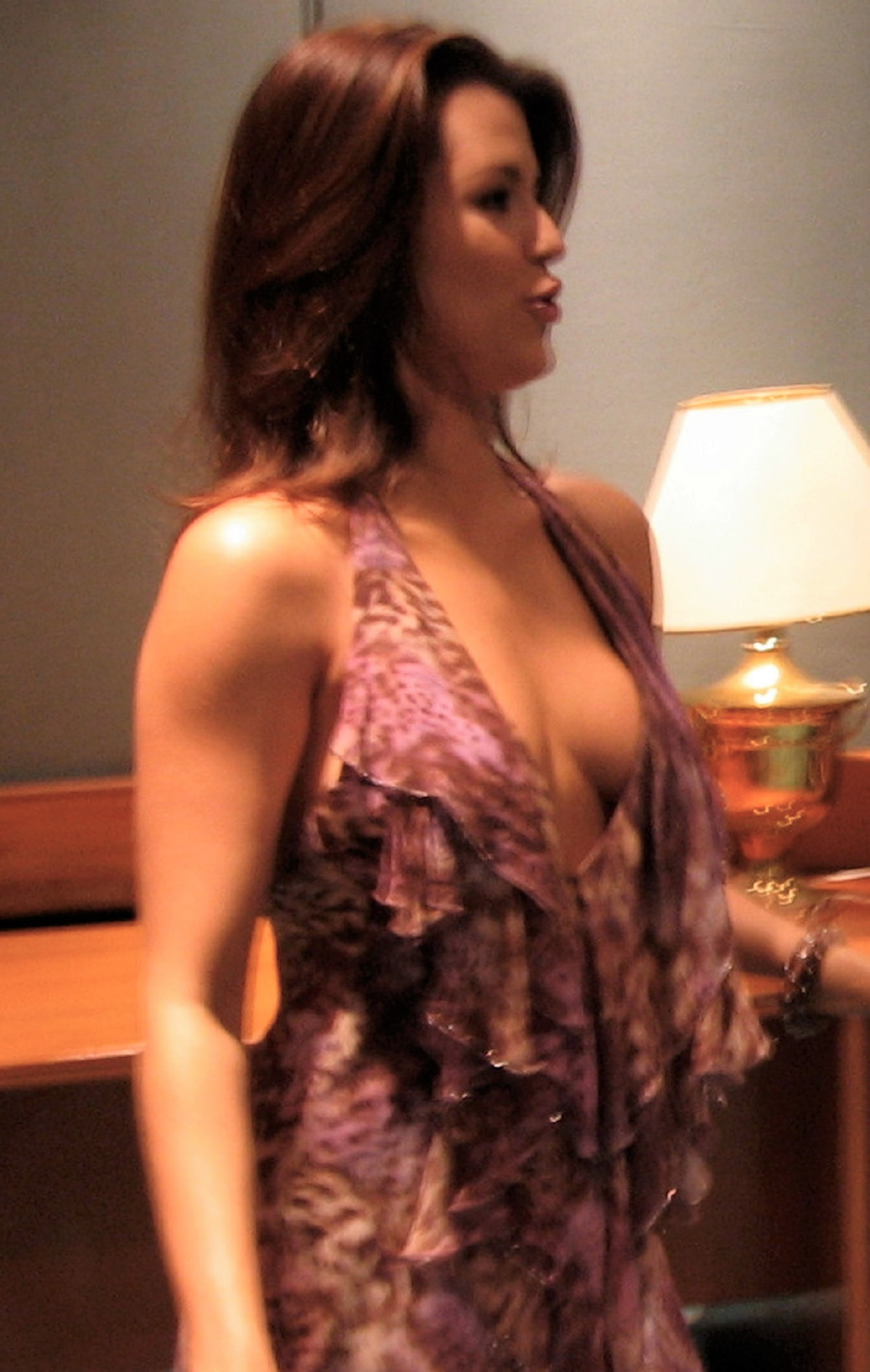
Miss Universe 1996
Alicia Machado
Venezuela

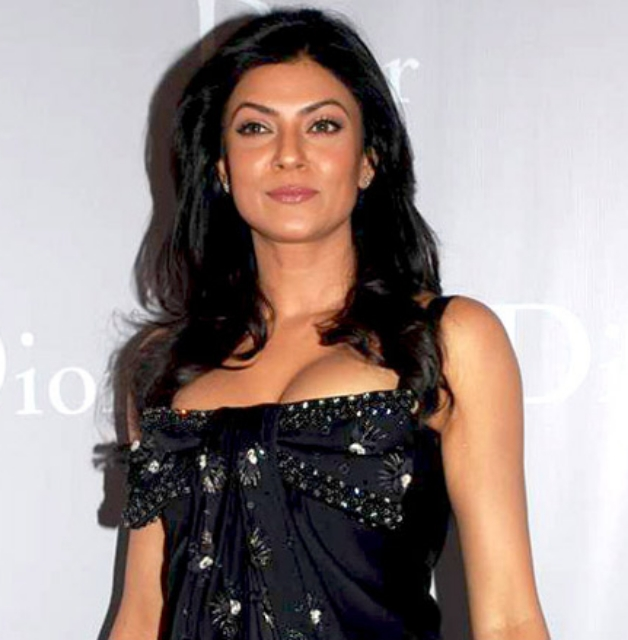
Miss Universe 1994
Sushmita Sen
India

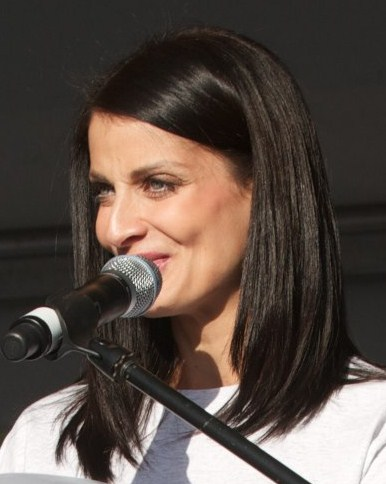
Miss Universe 1993
Dayanara Torres
Puerto Rico

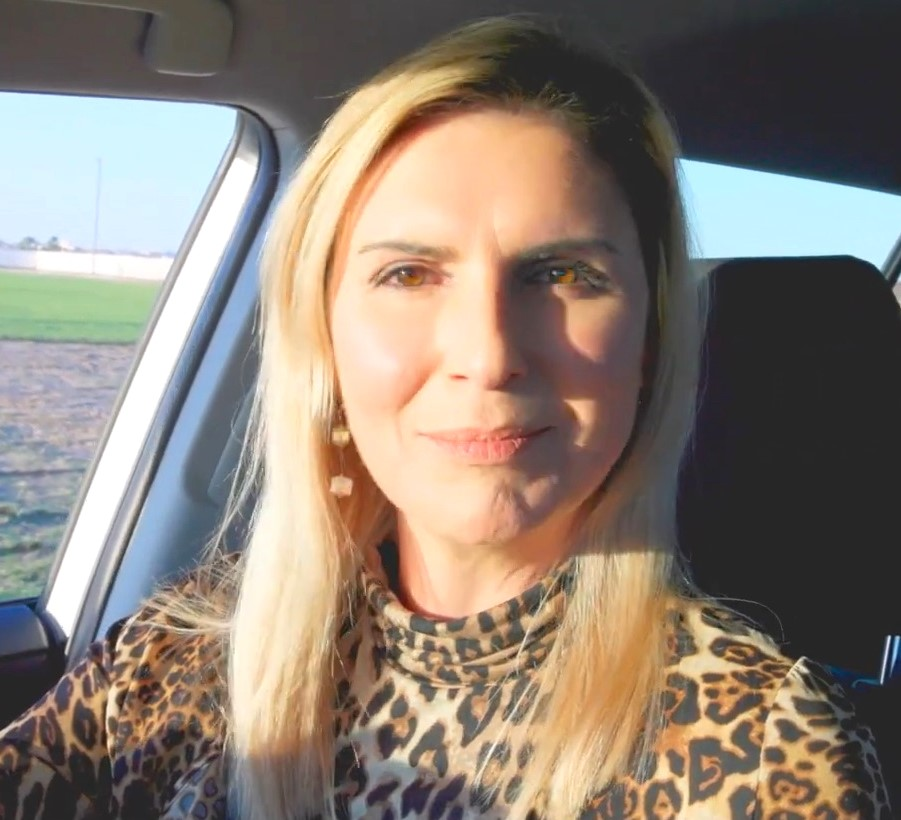
Miss Universe 1992
Michelle McLean
Namibia

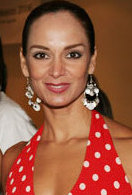
Miss Universe 1991
Lupita Jones
México

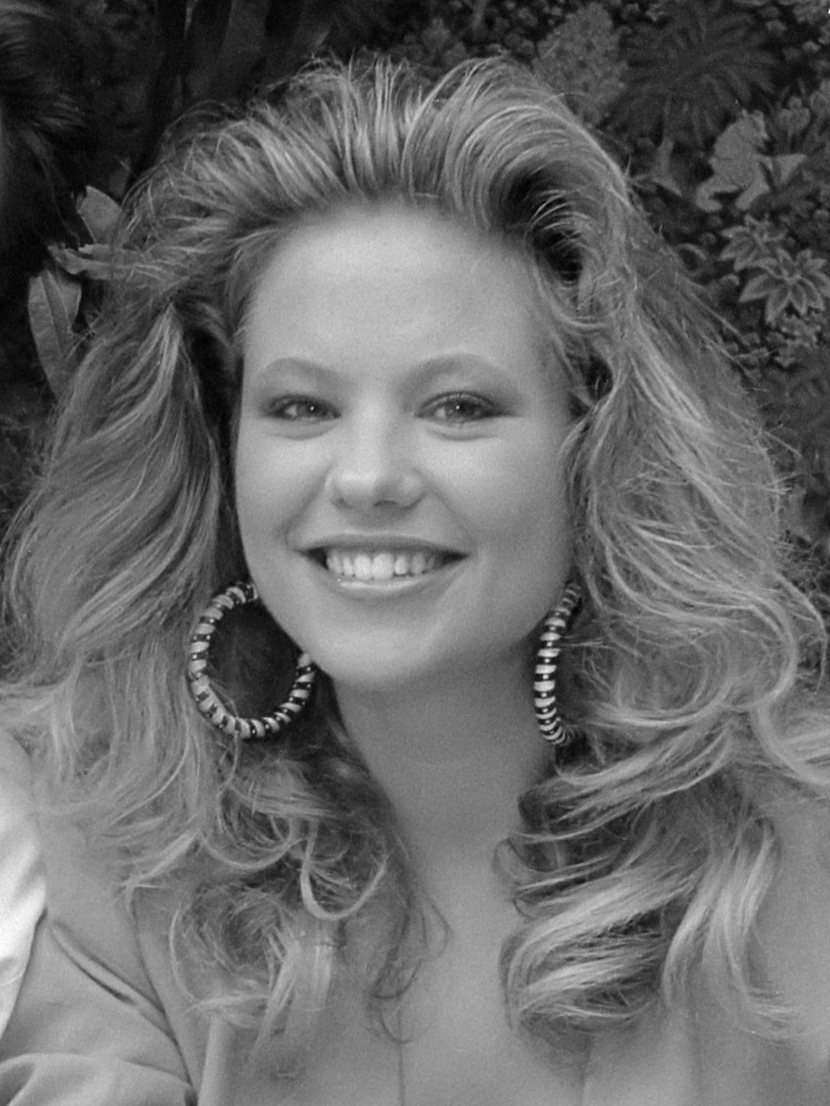
Miss Universe 1989
Angela Visser
Netherlands

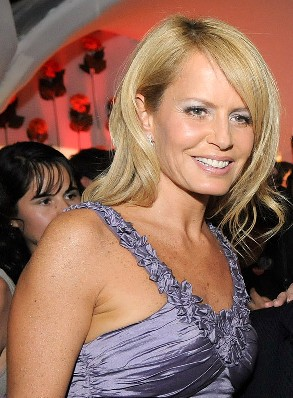
Miss Universe 1987
Cecilia Bolocco
Chile

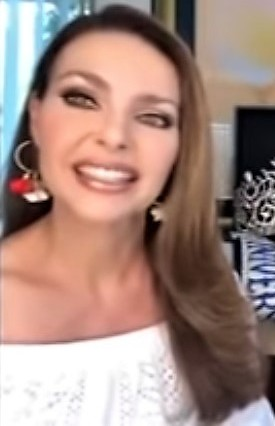
Miss Universe 1986
Bárbara Palacios
Venezuela

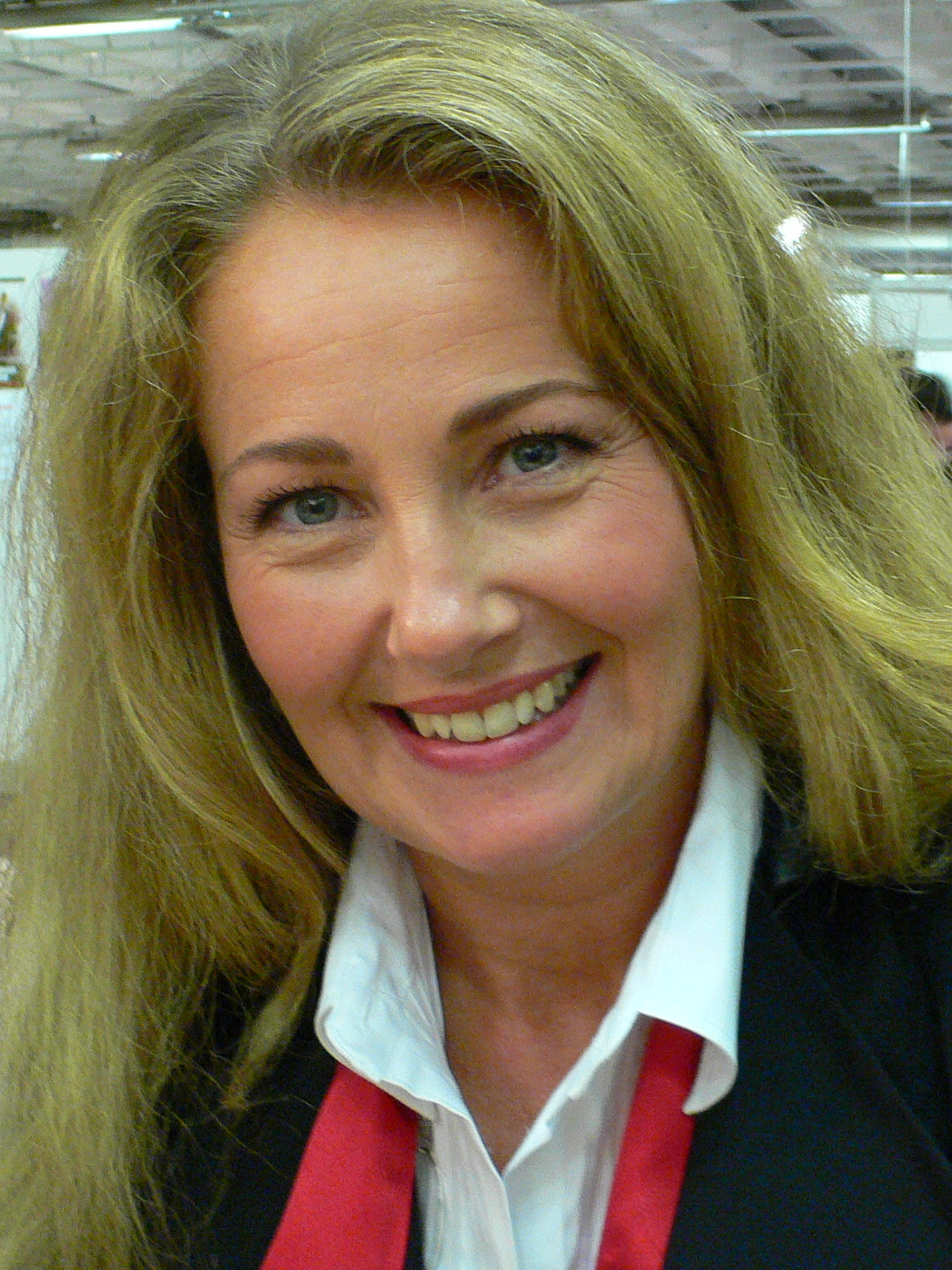
Miss Universe 1984
Yvonne Ryding
Sweden

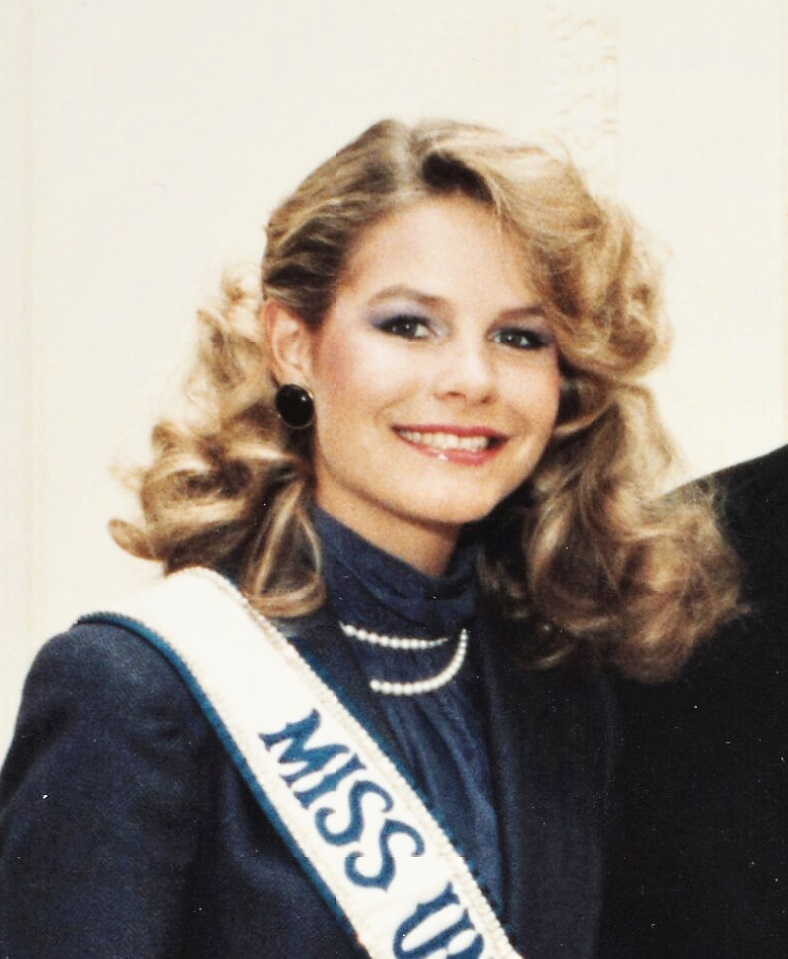
Miss Universe 1983
Lorraine Downes
New Zealand

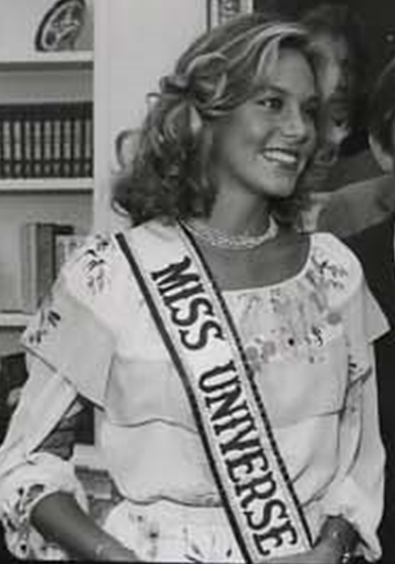
Miss Universe 1980
Shawn Weatherly
United States

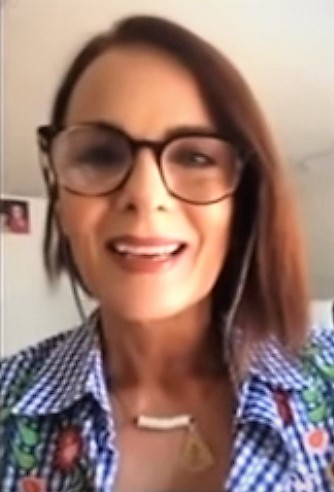
Miss Universe 1979
Maritza Sayalero
Venezuela

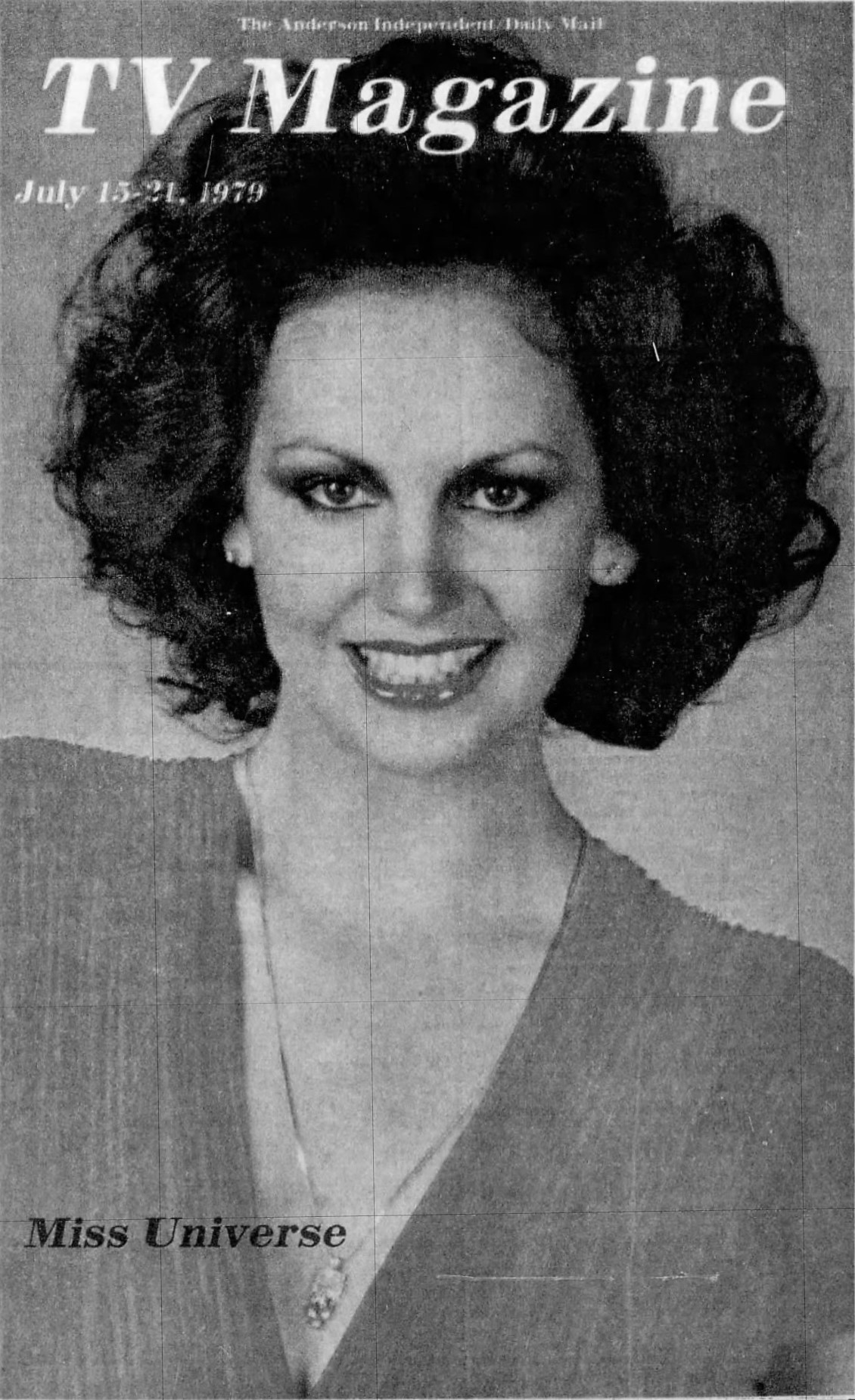
Miss Universe 1978
Margaret Gardiner
South Africa

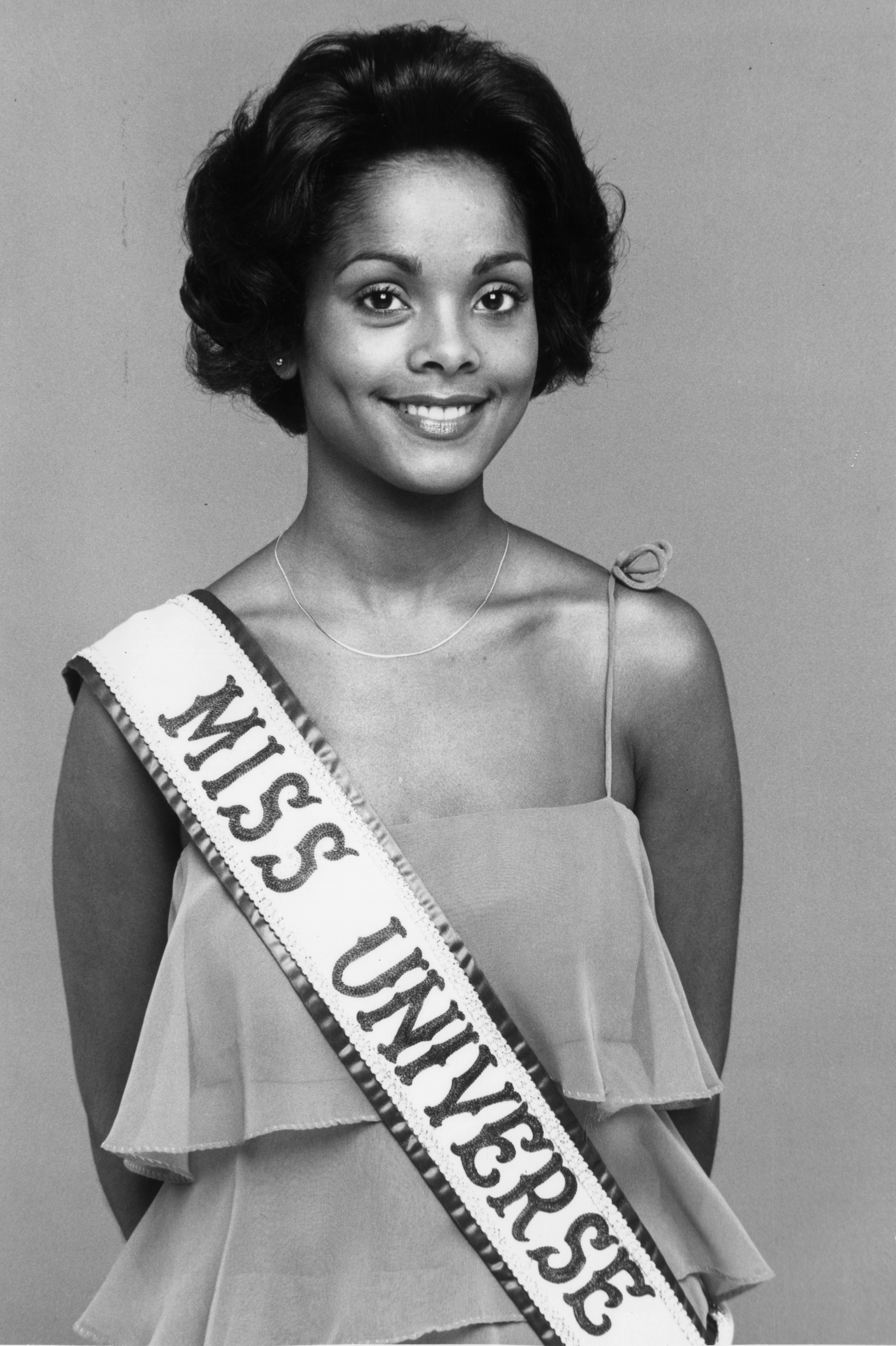
Miss Universe 1977
Janelle Commissiong
Trinidad and Tobago

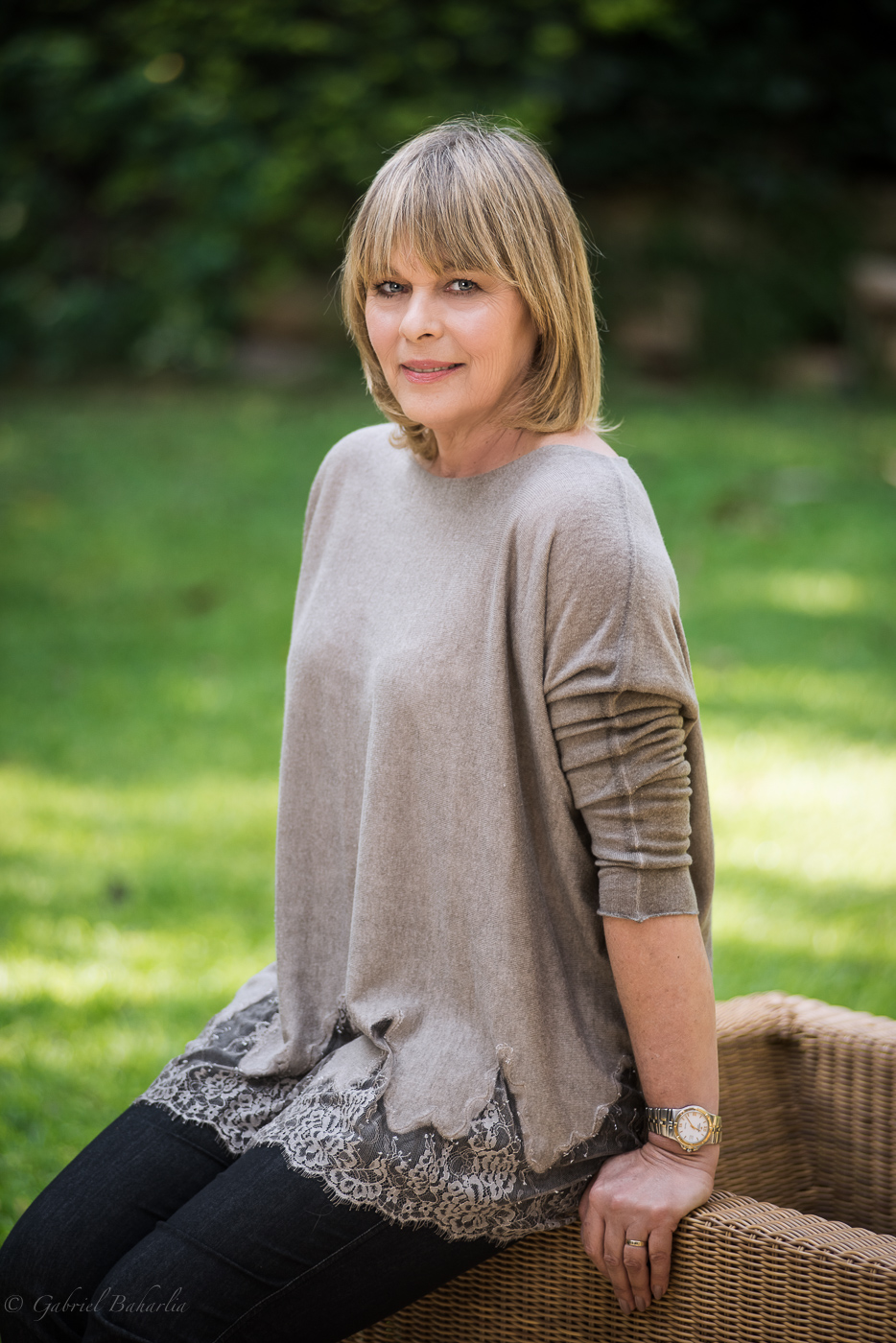
Miss Universe 1976
Rina Messinger
Israel

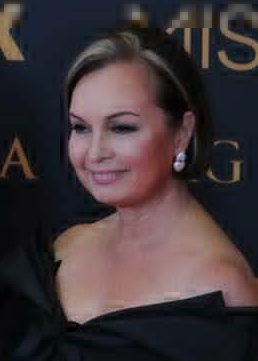
Miss Universe 1973
Margie Moran
Philippines

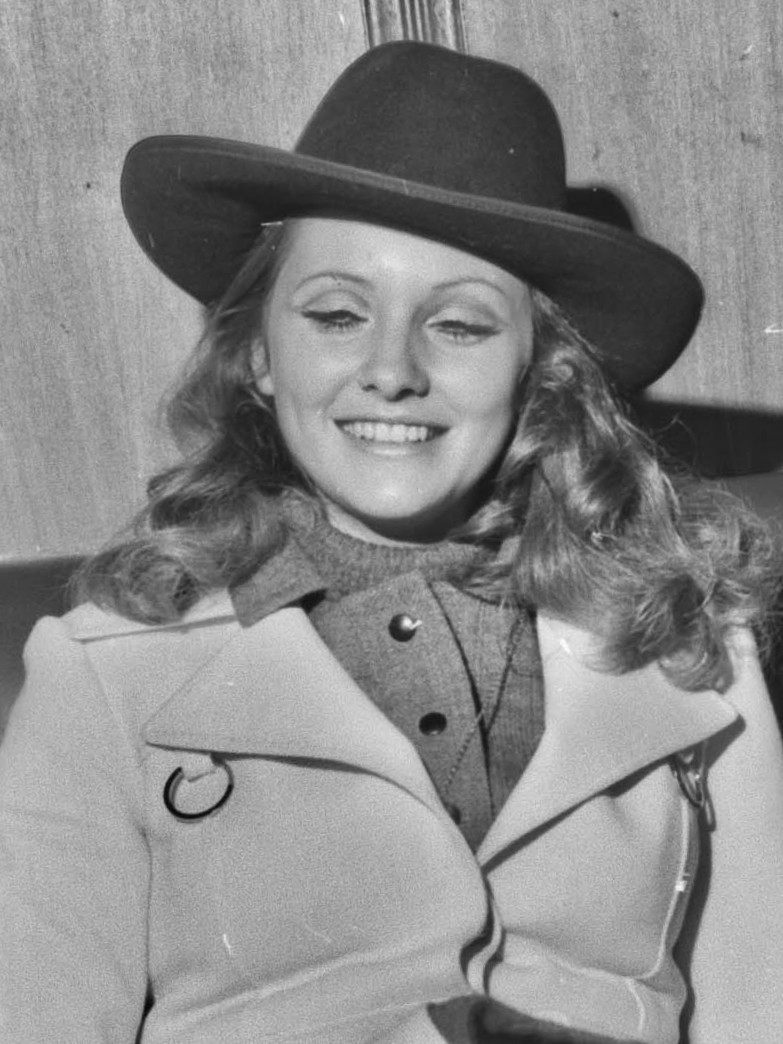
Miss Universe 1971
Georgina Rizk
Lebanon

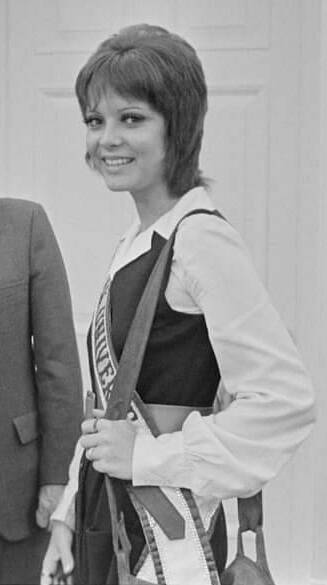
Miss Universe 1970
Marisol Malaret
Puerto Rico

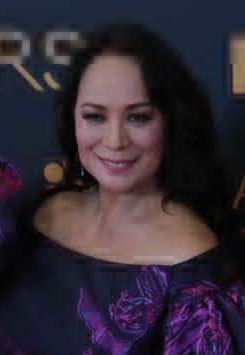
Miss Universe 1969
Gloria Diaz
Philippines

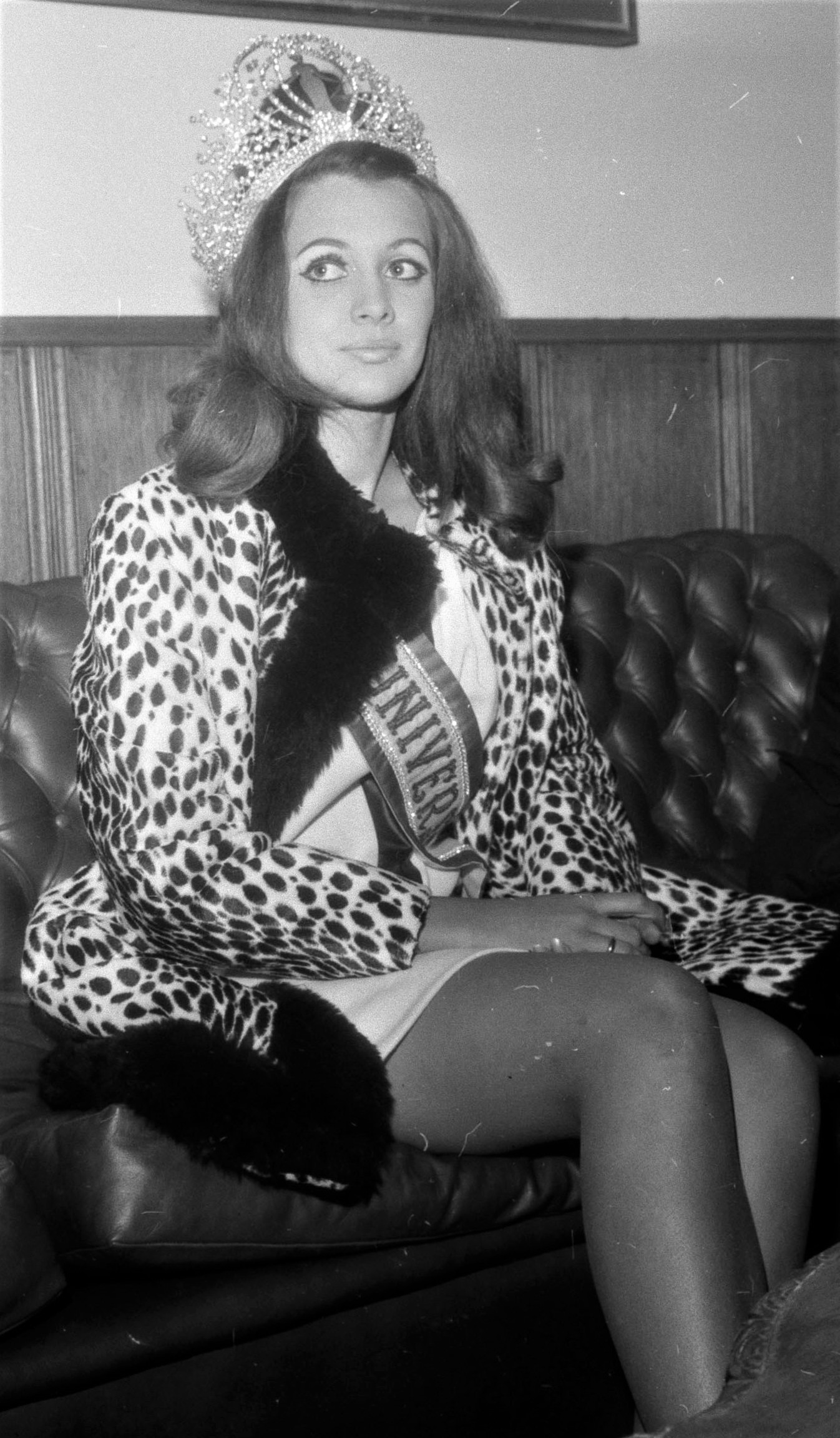
Miss Universe 1968
Martha Vasconcellos
Brazil

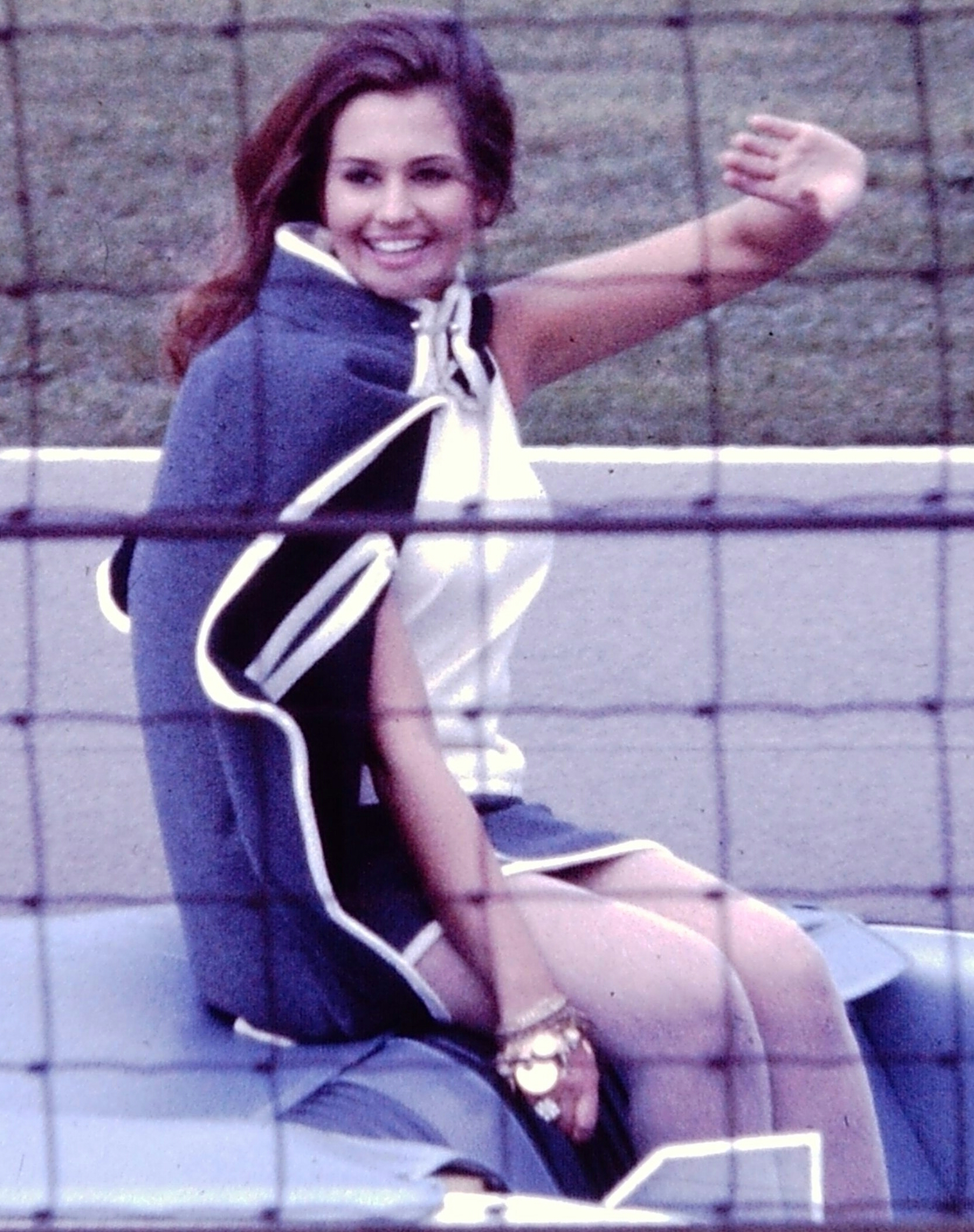
Miss Universe 1967
Sylvia Hitchcock
United States

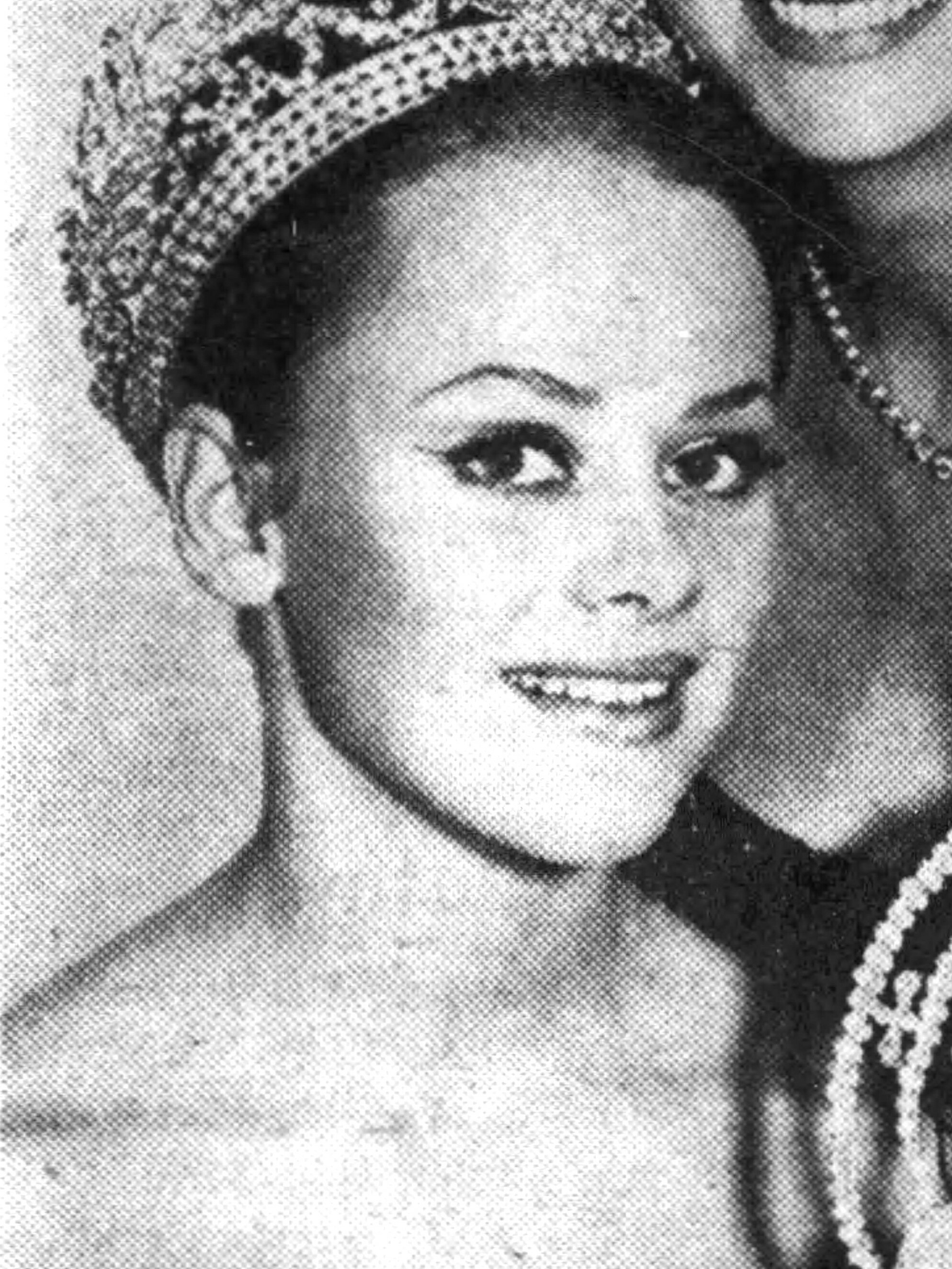
Miss Universe 1966
Margareta Arvidsson
Sweden

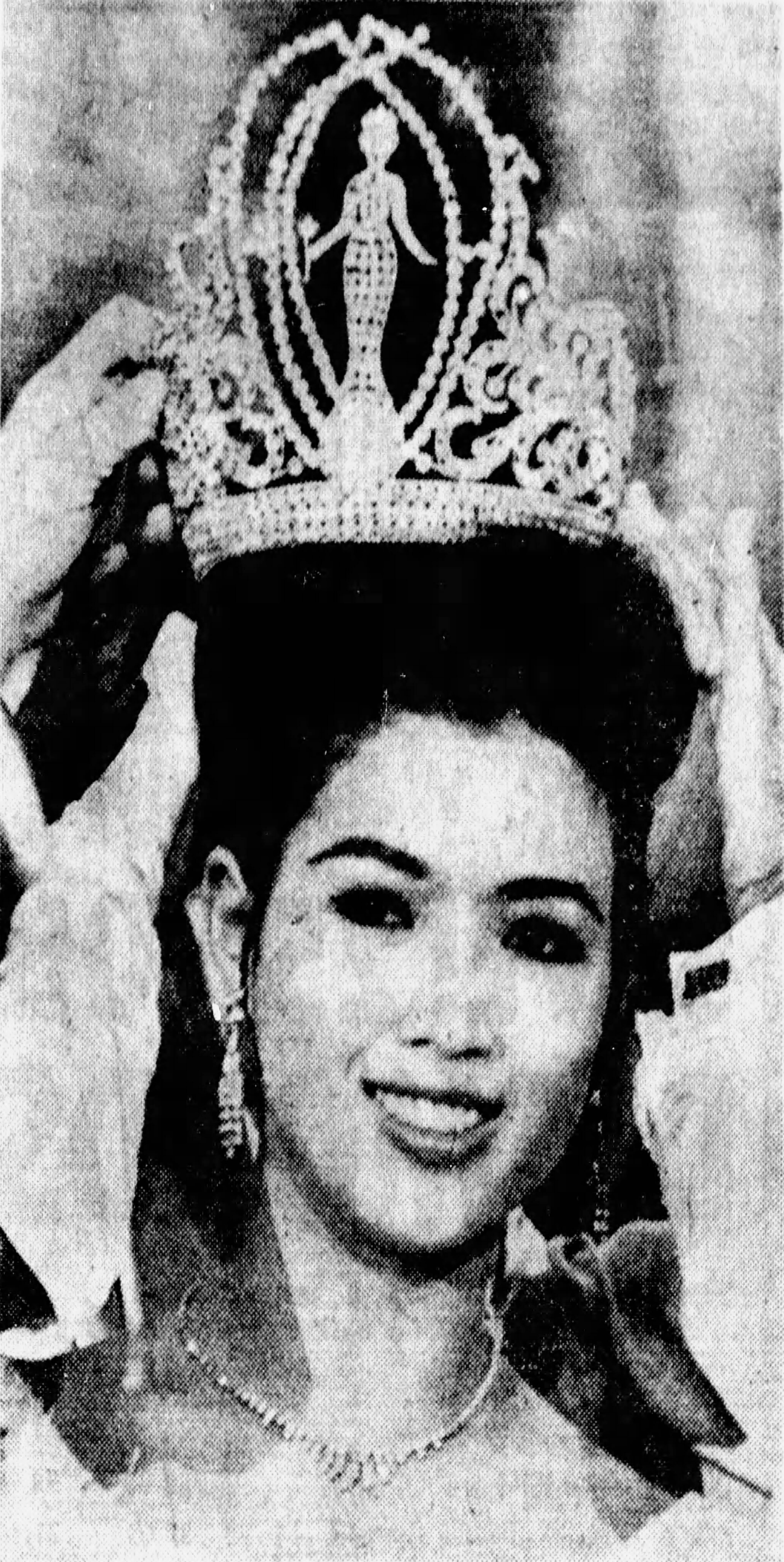
Miss Universe 1965
Apasra Hongsakula
Thailand

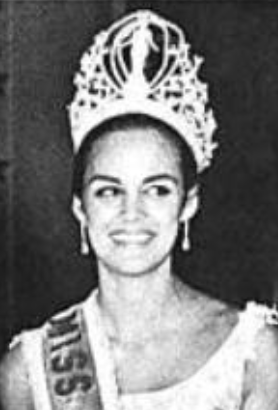
Miss Universe 1964
Corinna Tsopei
Greece

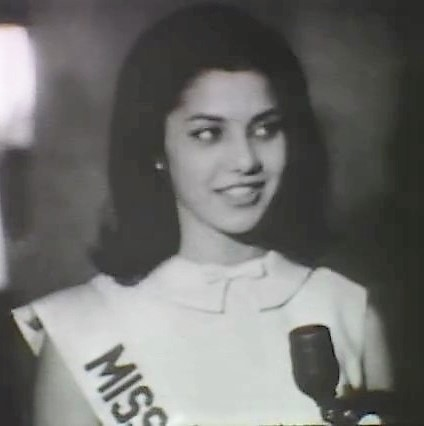
Miss Universe 1963
Iêda Maria Vargas
Brazil

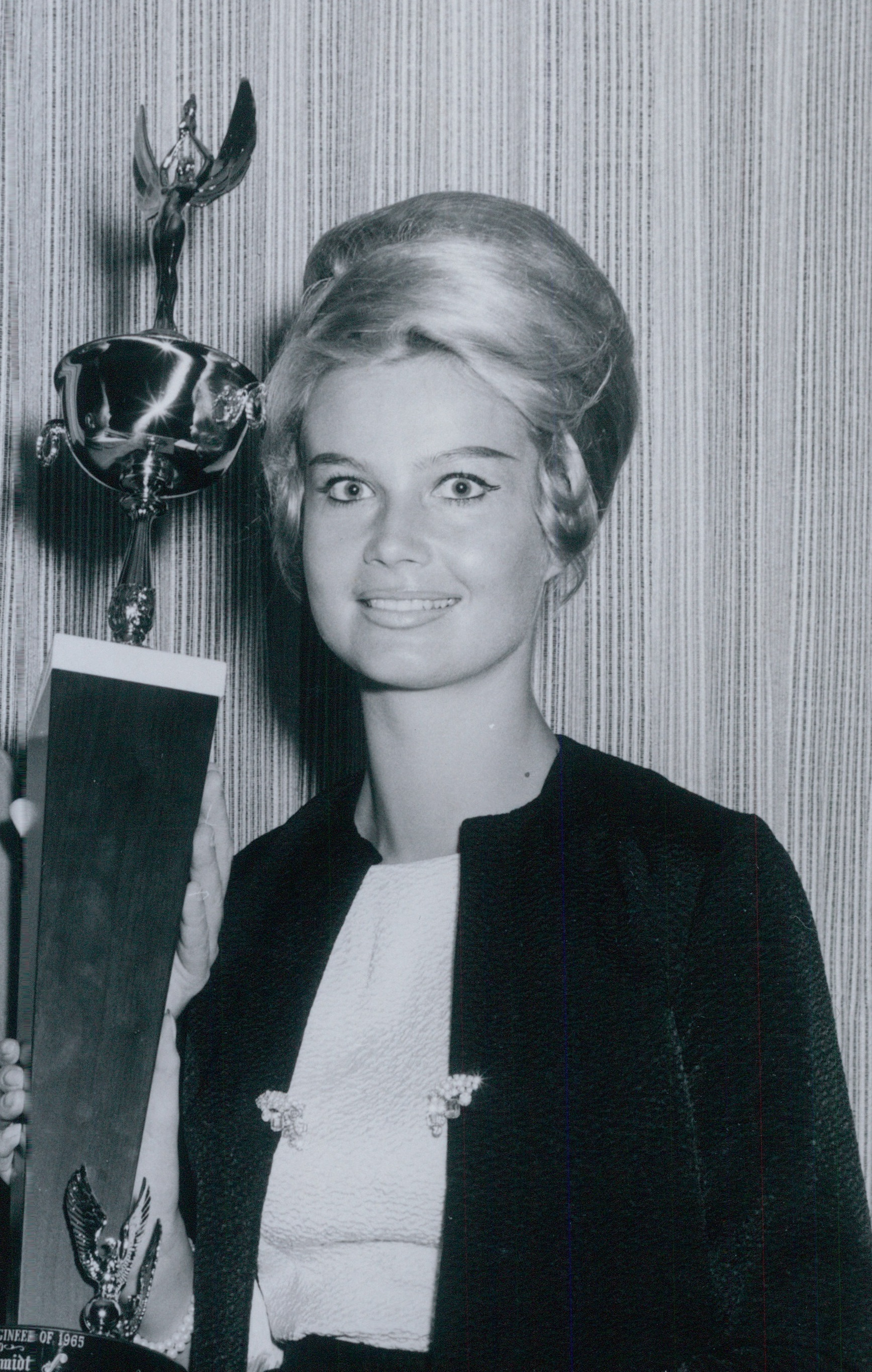
Miss Universe 1961
Marlene Schmidt
Germany

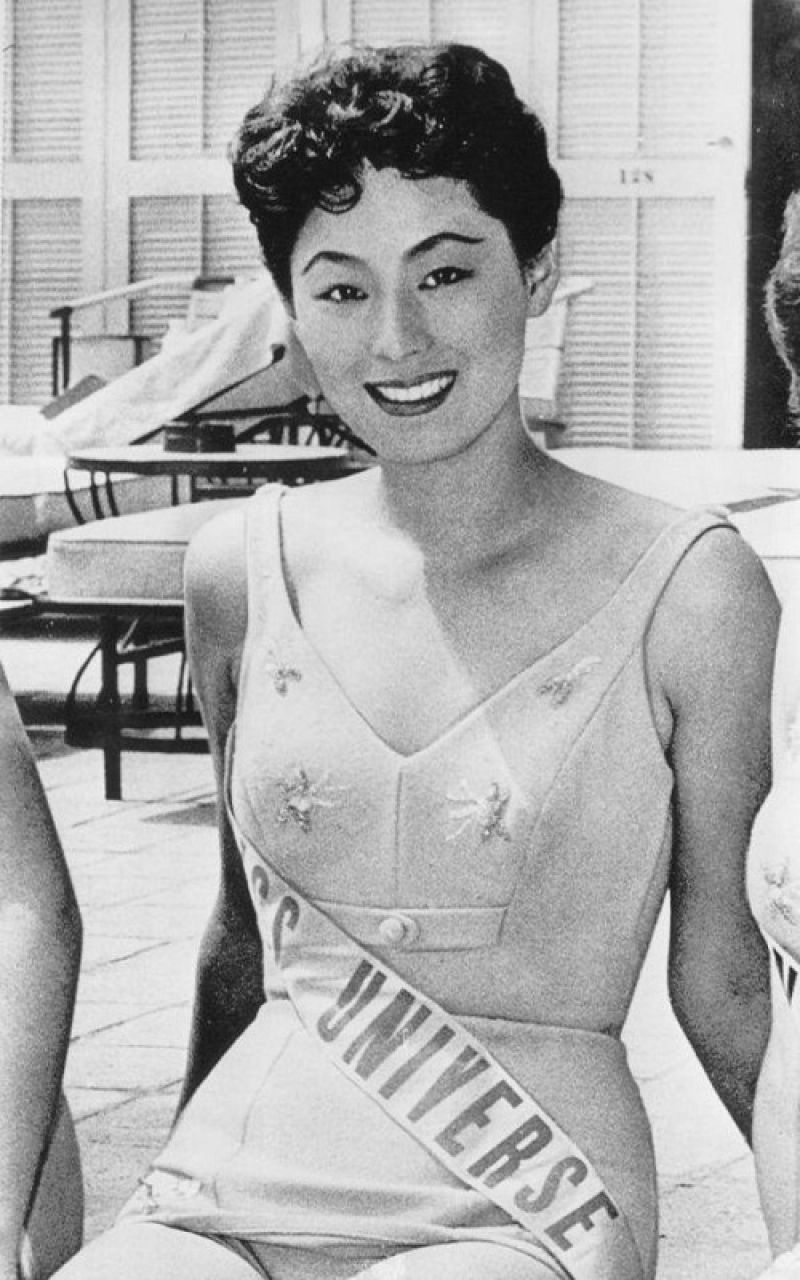
Miss Universe 1959
Akiko Kojima
Japan

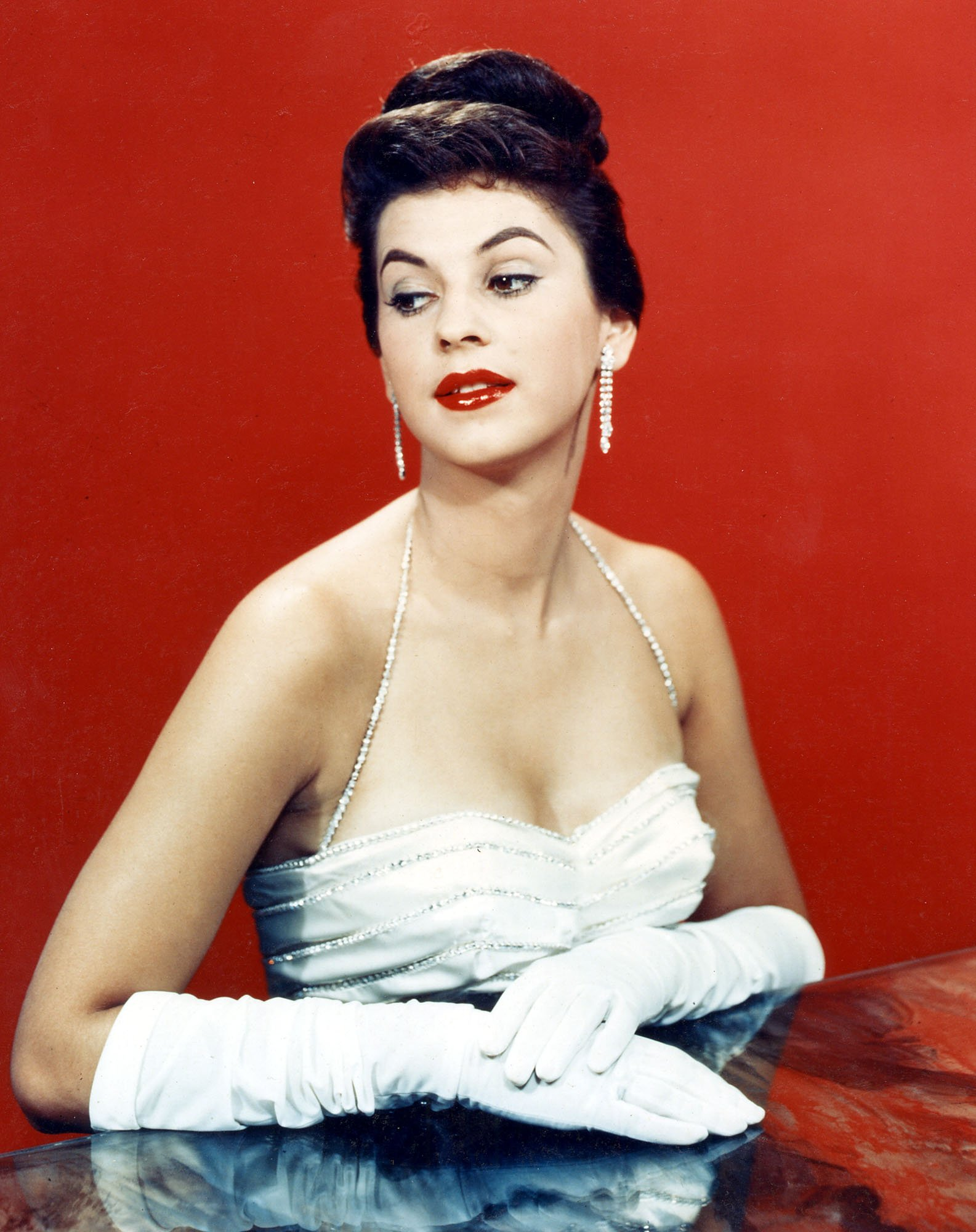
Miss Universe 1958
Luz Marina Zuluaga
Colombia

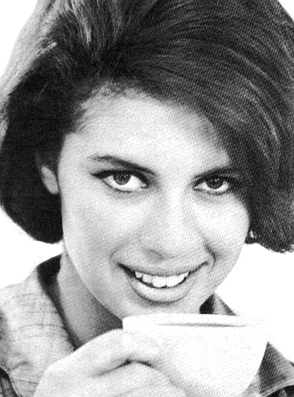
Miss Universe 1957
Gladys Zender
Peru

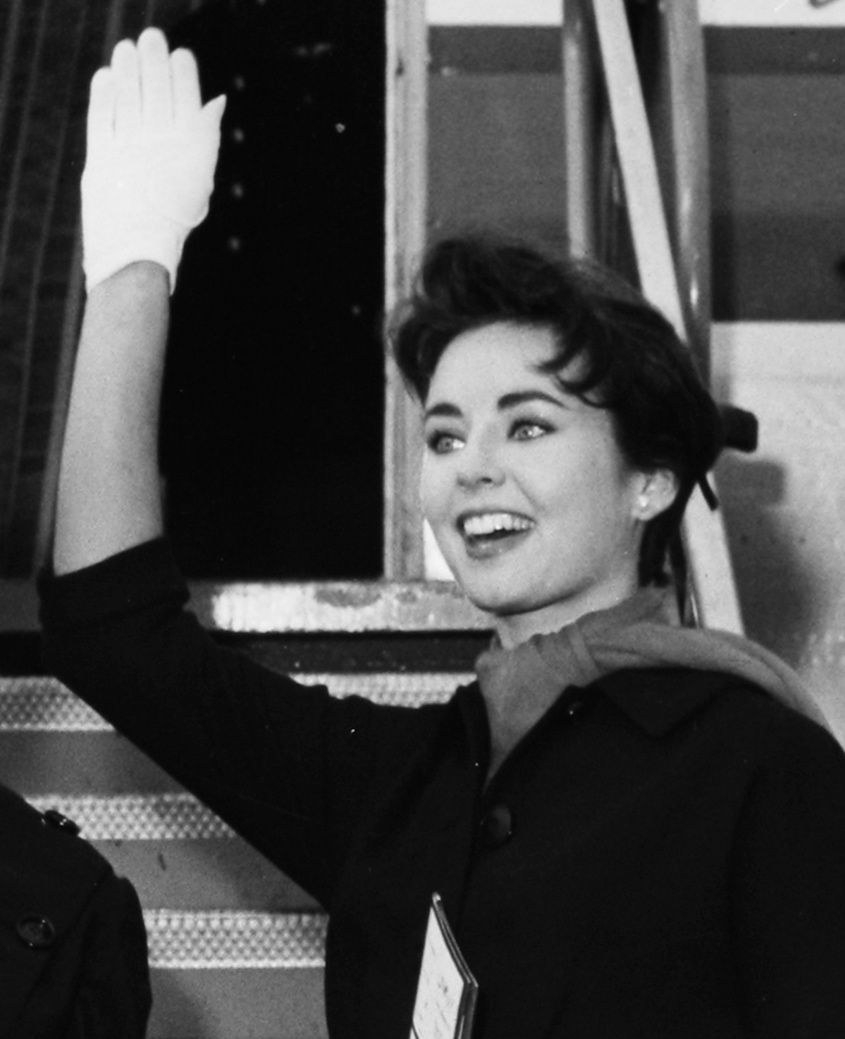
Miss Universe 1956
Carol Morris
United States

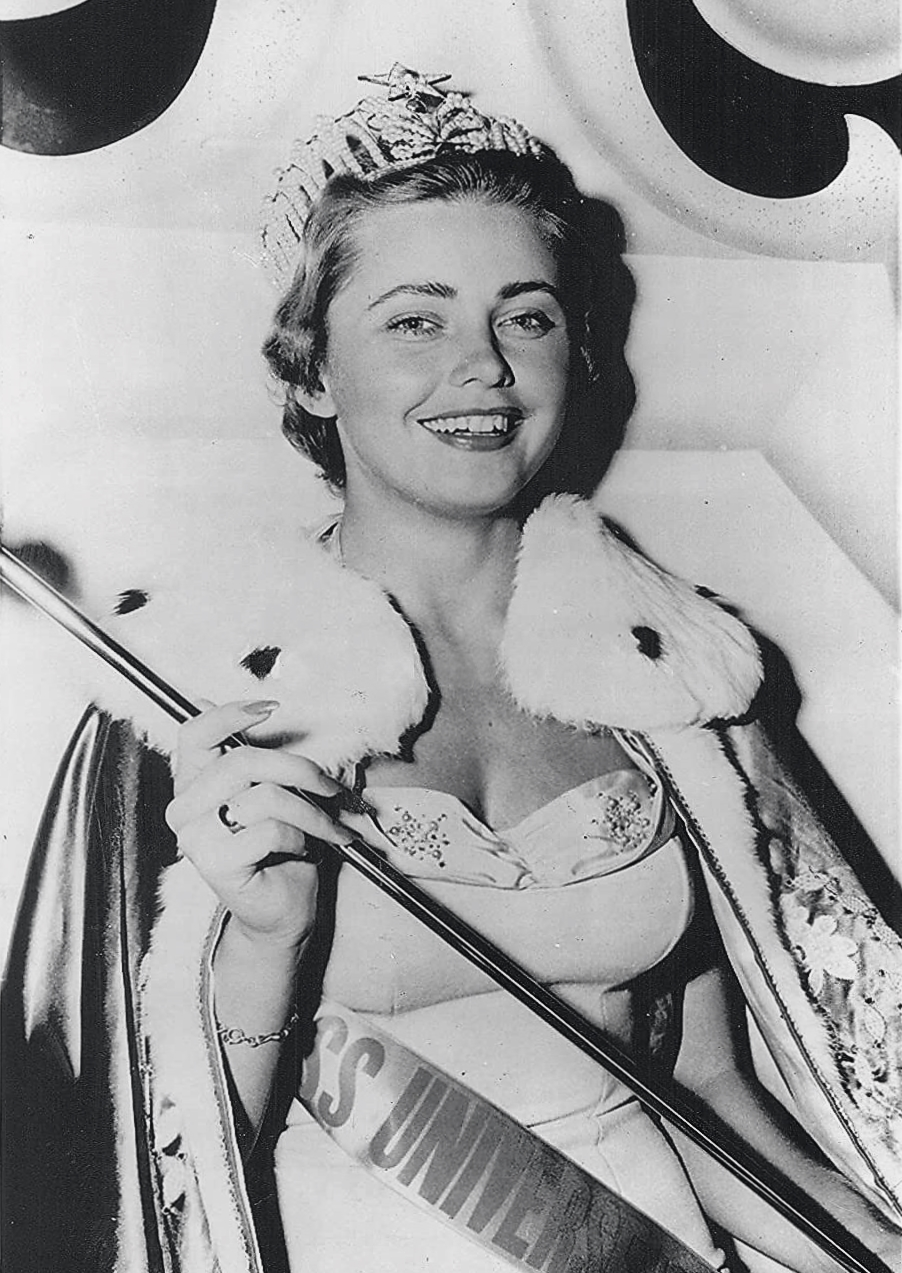
Miss Universe 1955
Hillevi Rombin
Sweden

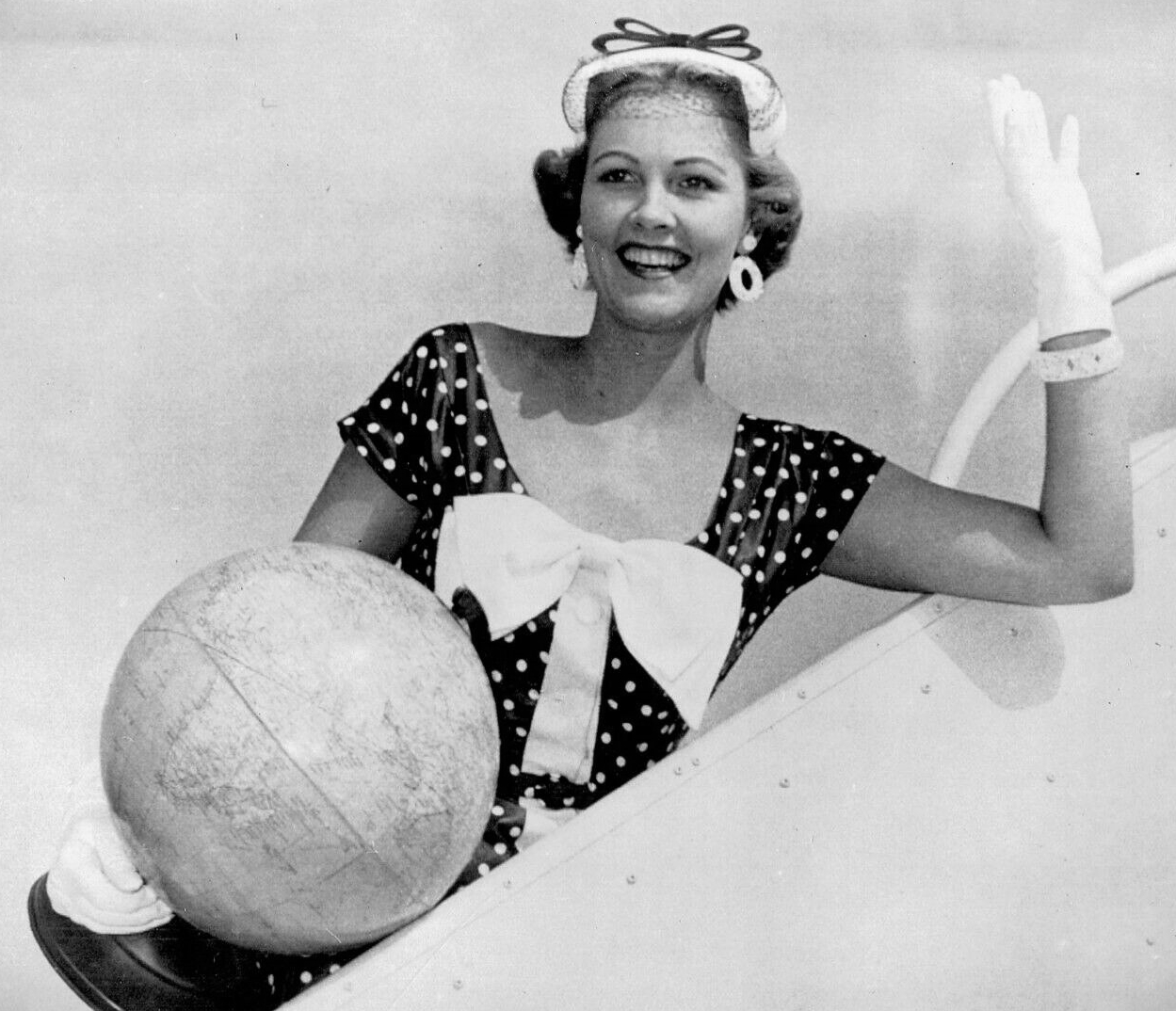
Miss Universe 1954
Miriam Stevenson
United States

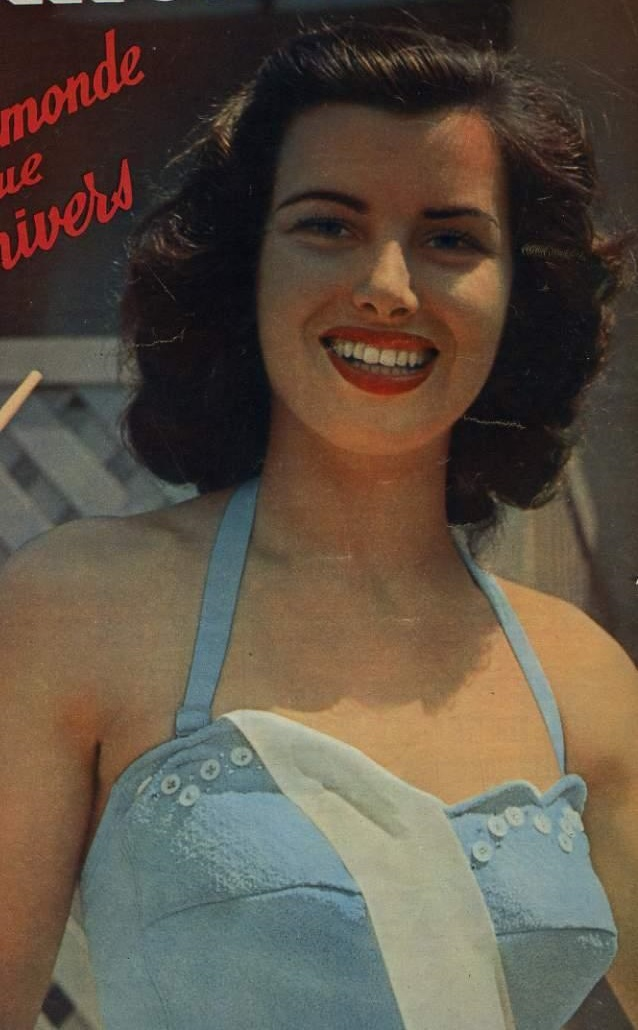
Miss Universe 1953
Christiane Martel
France

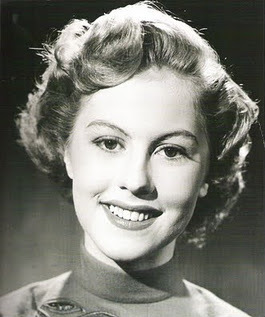
Miss Universe 1952
Armi Kuusela
Finland

== See also ==
- List of Miss Universe editions
- List of Miss Universe runners-up and finalists
- List of Miss Earth titleholders
- List of Miss International titleholders
- List of Miss World titleholders
- Big Four international beauty pageants
