= Sireethorn Leearamwat =

Miss International 2019

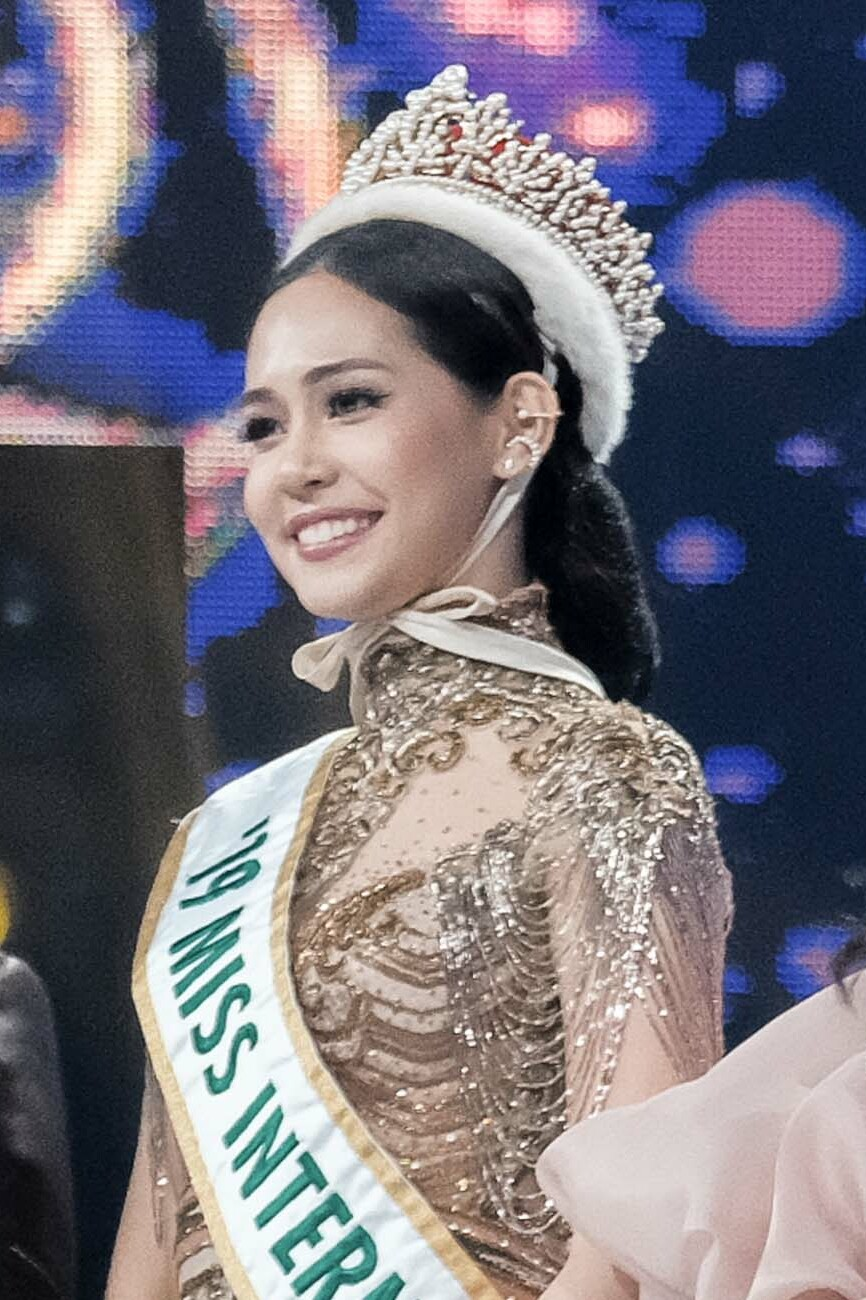
- Sireethorn in 2020
- Born: 4 December 1993 (age 32); Bangkok, Thailand
- Education: Mahidol University
- Occupations: Pharmacist; Actress
- Beauty pageant titleholder
- Title: Miss Thailand 2019; Miss International Thailand 2019; Miss International 2019
- Major competitions: Miss Thailand 2019; (Winner); Miss International 2019; (Winner); (Miss International Asia)

Sireethorn Leearamwat (Thai: สิรีธร ลีห์อร่ามวัฒน์; RTGS: Sirithon Li-aramwat; born 4 December 1993) nicknamed Bint, is a Thai beauty pageant titleholder who won Miss International 2019. She is the first woman from Thailand to win Miss International. Sireethorn also won Miss Thailand 2019.

== Early life ==
She attended Mahidol University, where she graduated with a Bachelor of Pharmacy degree. After graduating, she began working as a pharmacist in Bangkok.

== Pageantry ==
Sireethorn won her first pageant, Miss Thailand 2019. After receiving the right to represent Bangkok, she was selected as one of the representatives from Central Thailand to participate in the main competition. As Miss Thailand, Sireethorn received the right to represent Thailand at Miss International 2019.

Sireethorn competed in and won Miss International 2019 on 12 November 2019, in Tokyo, against 83 other competitors. She was crowned by the outgoing titleholder Mariem Velazco of Venezuela. Sireethorn became the first Thai woman to win Miss International, and the first since Bui Simon who won Miss Universe 1988, to win one of the Big Four international beauty pageants.

== Filmography ==
=== Television series ===
| Year | Title | Role | Network | Notes | Ref |
|---|---|---|---|---|---|
| 2021 | Rak Na Kor Rab | Pikul | ONE31 | Main | |
| 2021 | Love and Fortune | Wasee | ONE31 | Main | |
| 2023 | The Second Chance | Pin | ONE31 | Main | |
| 2024-2026 | Pen Tor | Yada | ONE31 | Guest | |
| 2024 | The Empress of Ayodhaya | La-ongkham / Sri Julalak | ONE31 | Support | |
| 2025 | The Under Gowns | Beauty | ONE31 | Main | |
| 2026 | Khom Khlang | Master Bulan | WeTV | Main | |

Awards and achievements
| Preceded by (Venezuela) Mariem Velazco | Miss International; 2019 | Succeeded by (Germany) Jasmin Selberg |
| Preceded by (Singapore) Eileen Feng | Miss International Asia; 2019 | Succeeded by (Japan) Kiko Matsuo |
| Preceded by Keeratiga Jaruratjamon | Miss International Thailand; 2019 | Succeeded by Ruechanok Meesang, Chonburi |
| Preceded by Thanaporn Sriwirach, Phayao | Miss Thailand; 2019 | Succeeded by Natthapat Pongpraphan, Nakhon Pathom |
| New title | Nang Ngam Central; 2019 | Succeeded by None |
| New title | Nang Ngam Krung Thep Maha Nakhon; 2019 | Succeeded by None |
