= Kanya (disambiguation) =

Kanya is a month of the Indian solar calendar.

Kanya may also refer to:

== Places ==
- Kánya, a town in Hungary
- Kanye, Botswana, a town

== People ==
=== Given name ===
- Kanya Bharathi, Indian actress
- Kanya D'Almeida, Sri Lankan writer
- Kanya King (1969–2026), British entrepreneur
- Kanya Kounvongsa (born 1990), Laotian footballer
- Kanya Rattanapetch (born 1989), Thai model and actress
- Kanya Thiensawang (1914–1960), Thai beauty pageant winner
- Kanya Viljoen (born 1994), South African actress

=== Surname ===
- Emilia Kánya (1830–1905), Hungarian feminist writer
- Kanya Fujimoto (born 1999), Japanese footballer
- Kálmán Kánya (1869–1945), Hungarian foreign minister

== See also ==
- Kanyaka (disambiguation)
- Kanian (disambiguation)
- Kaniyar, a caste in southern India
