= Miss Perú 1988 =

- Date: April 27, 1988
- Presenters: Horacio Paredes, Inés Hormazábal
- Venue: Teatro Segura
- Broadcaster: Frecuencia Latina
- Entrants: 20
- Winner: Katia Escudero; La Libertad

The Miss Perú 1988 pageant was held on April 27, 1988. That year, 20 candidates were competing for the national crown. The chosen winners represented Peru at the Miss Universe 1988 and Miss World 1988. The rest of the finalists would enter in different pageants.

== Placements ==
Final Results	Contestant
Miss Peru Universe 1988	La Libertad - Katia Escudero
Miss World Peru 1988	Distrito Capital – Martha Elena Kaik
Miss International Peru 1988	Piura - Susan León Cavassa
Miss Peru Playa 1988	Ica - Myra Cabrera
Top 8	Loreto - Nuria Piug; Region Lima - Silvana Ferrari; Ucayali - Pierina Sarria Fasce; Amazonas - Martha Sofía Salazar

== Special awards ==
- Best Regional Costume - Puno - Monica Rengifo
- Miss Photogenic - Loreto - Nuria Piug Raygada
- Miss Elegance - Amazonas - Martha Sofía Salazar
- Miss Body - Piura - Susan León
- Best Hair - La Libertad - Katia Escudero
- Miss Congeniality - Region Lima - Silvana Ferrari
- Most Beautiful Face - Amazonas - Martha Sofía Salazar

.

== Delegates ==
- Amazonas - Martha Sofía Salazar
- Arequipa - Guadalupe Rojas
- Cajamarca - Yesenia Castillo
- Callao - Teresa Jimenez
- Cuzco - Milagros Velazco
- Distrito Capital - Martha Elena Kaik
- Huancavelica - Ursula Leyva
- Huánuco - Erika Lantos
- Ica - Myra Cabrera
- Junín - Marcela Rizzo
- La Libertad - Katia Escudero
- Loreto - Nuria Piug
- Madre de Dios - Judith Amado Dueñas
- Piura - Susan León Cavassa
- Puno - Monica Rengifo
- Region Lima - Silvana Ferrari
- San Martín - Charito Gomez
- Tacna - Lourdes Escaffe
- Ucayali - Pierina Sarria Fasce
- USA Peru - Stephanie Klinge

.

== Trivia ==
- Silvana Ferrari is sister of Miss Peru 1984 Fiorella Ferrari.
- Nuria Piug went to Miss Wonderland the following year where placed 1st Runner-Up, and 7 years later crowned Mrs. Peru 1995.
