= Jang Yoon-jeong =

Jang Yoon-jeong may refer to:

- Jang Yoon-jeong (singer) (born 1980), South Korean trot singer
- Jang Yoon-jeong (Miss Korea) (born 1970), South Korean actress, TV Host and beauty queen who was named Miss Korea in 1987
