= Miss Universe 1966 =

15th Miss Universe pageant

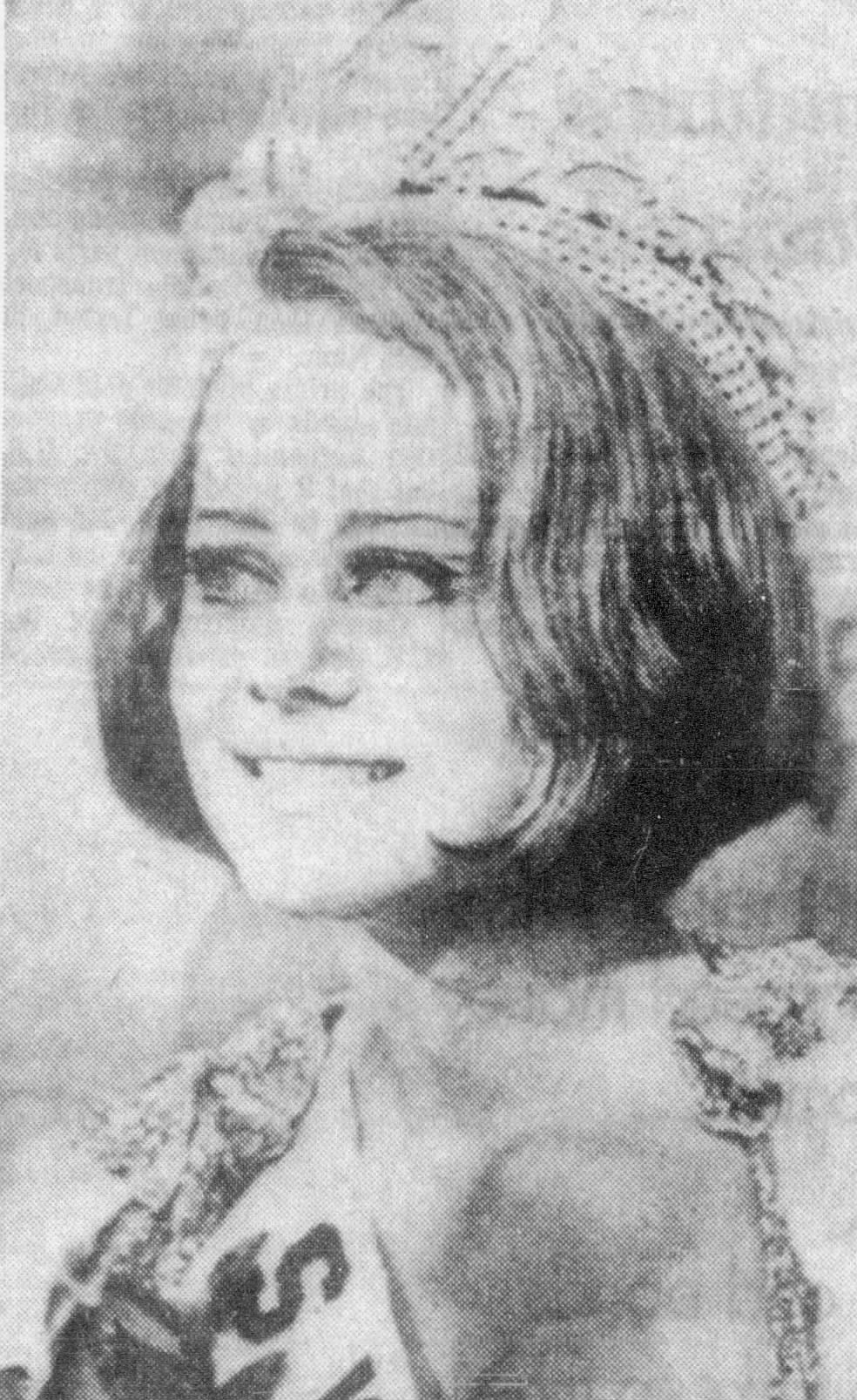
- Margareta Arvidsson
- Date: 16 July 1966
- Presenters: Pat Boone; June Lockhart; Jack Linkletter
- Venue: Miami Beach Auditorium, Miami Beach, Florida, United States
- Broadcaster: CBS
- Entrants: 58
- Placements: 15
- Debuts: Guam
- Withdrawals: Australia; Hong Kong; Mexico; Portugal; Tunisia; Uruguay
- Returns: Argentina; Chile; Lebanon; Morocco; Singapore; Suriname; Trinidad and Tobago
- Winner: Margareta Arvidsson; Sweden
- Congeniality: Elizabeth Sanchez (Curaçao); Paquita Torres (Spain)
- Best National Costume: Aviva Israeli (Israel)
- Photogenic: Margareta Arvidsson (Sweden)

Miss Universe 1966 was the 15th Miss Universe pageant, held at the Miami Beach Auditorium in Miami Beach, Florida, on 16 July 1966.

At the conclusion of the event, Apasra Hongsakula of Thailand crowned Margareta Arvidsson of Sweden as Miss Universe 1966. It is the second victory of Sweden in the history of the pageant.

Contestants from fifty-eight countries and territories competed in this edition. The pageant was hosted by Jack Linkletter, while Pat Boone and June Lockhart served as backstage correspondents. This edition of Miss Universe is the first to be broadcast in color.

== Background ==
=== Selection of participants ===
Contestants from fifty-eight countries and territories were selected to compete in the pageant. One candidate was appointed to represent her country to replace the original dethroned winner.

==== Replacements ====
Miss Dominion of Canada 1966, Diane Coulter, withdrew for health concerns and was replaced by her first runner-up, Marjorie Schofield.

==== Debuts, returns, and withdrawals ====
This edition saw the debut of Guam, and the returns of Lebanon and Singapore which last competed in 1962; Morocco in 1963; and Argentina, Suriname, and Trinidad and Tobago in 1964.

Moomba Queen 1966, Erica McMillan, was scheduled to compete as the Australian representative but died in a car accident. No one was sent as a replacement, forcing the country to withdraw. Miss Tunisia, Zeineb Lamine, and Miss Uruguay, Susana Regeden, both withdrew for undisclosed reasons. Hong Kong, Mexico, and Portugal withdrew after their respective organizations failed to hold a national competition or appoint a delegate.

Miss Honduras 1966, Danira Miralda Buines, and Miss Saint Vincent 1966, Anna Ellis, both withdrew for undisclosed reasons.

== Results ==
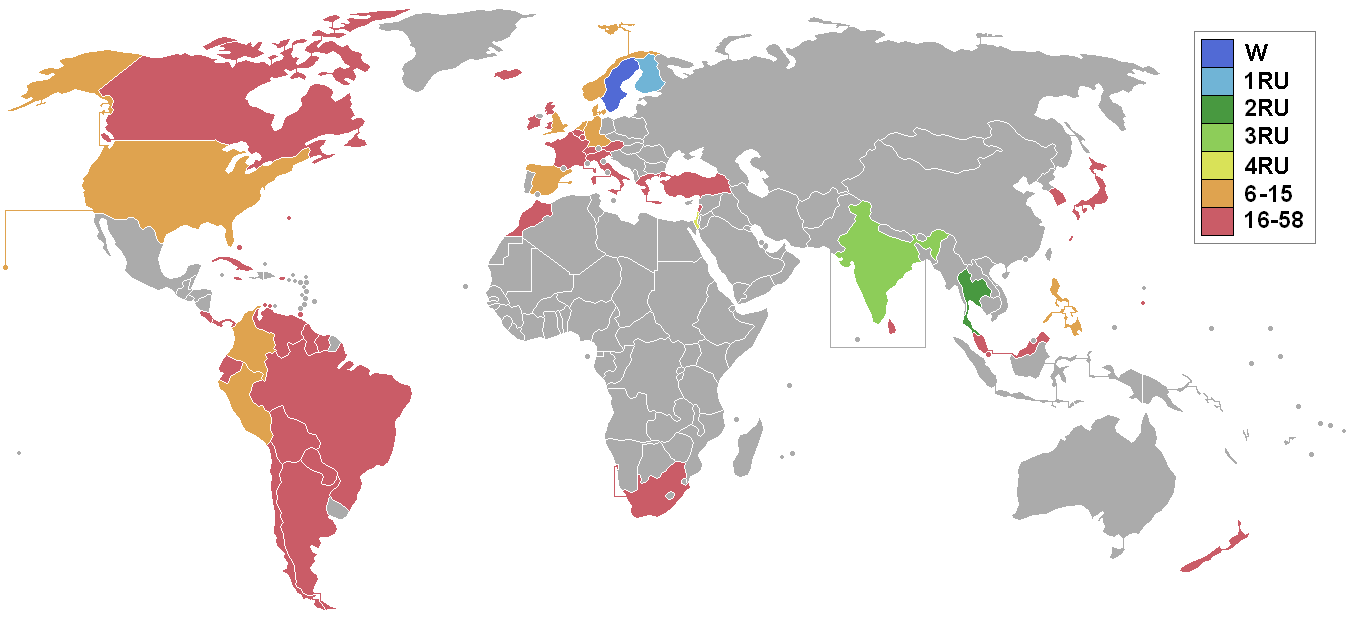
Miss Universe 1966 participating countries and territories

=== Placements ===
Placement	Contestant
Miss Universe 1966	Sweden – Margareta Arvidsson
1st Runner-Up	Finland – Satu Östring
2nd Runner-Up	Thailand – Cheranand Savetanand
3rd Runner-Up	India – Yasmin Daji
4th Runner-Up	Israel – Aviva Israeli
Top 15	Colombia – Edna Rudd; Denmark – Gitte Kleinert; England – Janice Whiteman; Holland – Margo Domen; Norway – Siri Nilsen; Peru – Madeleine Hartog-Bel; Philippines – Clarinda Soriano; Spain – Paquita Torres; United States – Maria Remenyi; West Germany – Marion Heinrich

=== Special awards ===
Award	Contestant
Miss Amity	Curaçao – Elizabeth Sanchez; Spain – Paquita Torres
Miss Photogenic	Sweden – Margareta Arvidsson
Best National Costume	Israel – Aviva Israeli

== Pageant ==
=== Format ===
Miss Universe has made several changes to the competition format. Starting with this edition, instead of revealing the 15 semifinalists during the preliminary competition, they were called one by one at the final competition, in no particular order. After announcing their countries, the semifinalists were individually interviewed by Jack Linkletter. Following the interviews, the 15 semifinalists participated in the swimsuit and evening gown competitions. From fifteen, five contestants were shortlisted to advance to the final interview.

=== Selection committee ===
- Sigvard Bernadotte – Swedish prince and designer
- Count Jean de Beaumont – French art critic
- Anthony Delano – Foreign correspondent of the Daily Mirror
- Philippe Halsman – American portrait photographer
- Dong Kingman – Chinese-American painter
- Armi Kuusela-Hilario – Miss Universe 1952 from Finland
- Eartha Kitt – American singer and actress
- Sukich Nimmanheminda – Former Ambassador of Thailand to the United States
- Akira Takarada – Japanese actor
- Earl Wilson – American columnist and journalist

== Contestants ==
Fifty-eight contestants competed for the title.

Country/Territory	Contestant	Age (Note: Ages at the time of the pageant)	Hometown
Argentina	Elba Baso	20	Buenos Aires
Aruba	Sandra Fang	18	San Nicolaas
Austria	Renate Polacek	21	Vienna
Bahamas	Sandra Jarrett	19	Nassau
Belgium	Mireille de Man	18	Brussels
Bermuda	Marie Trott	20	Hamilton
Bolivia	María Elena Borda	20	Santa Cruz de la Sierra
Brazil	Ana Ridzi	19	Rio de Janeiro
Canada	Marjorie Schofield	18	Burlington
Ceylon	Lorraine Roosmalecocq	20	Colombo
Chile	Stella Dunnage	20	Bíobío
Colombia	Edna Rudd	19	Bogotá
Costa Rica	Virginia Oreamuno	18	Cartago
Cuba	Lesbia Murrieta	20	Miami
Curaçao	Elizabeth Sanchez	18	Willemstad
Denmark	Gitte Fleinert	18	Copenhagen
Ecuador	Martha Cecilia Andrade	22	Quito
England	Janice Whiteman	21	Southampton
Finland	Satu Östring	19	Tampere
France	Michèle Boule	19	Cannes
Greece	Katia Balafouta	21	Athens
Guam	Barbara Perez	20	Agana
Guyana	Umblita Van Sluytman	20	Georgetown
Holland	Margo Domen	18	The Hague
Iceland	Erla Traustadóttir	22	Garðabær
India	Yasmin Daji	19	Kanpur
Ireland	Gladys Waller	21	Dublin
Israel	Aviva Israeli	18	Tel Aviv
Italy	Paola Bossalino	20	Rome
Jamaica	Beverly Savory	22	Kingston
Japan	Atsumi Ikeno	18	Yao
Lebanon	Yolla Harb	18	Beirut
Luxembourg	Gigi Antinori	19	Luxembourg City
Malaysia	Helen Lee	18	Ipoh
Morocco	Joëlle Lesage	–	Rabat
New Zealand	Heather Gettings	20	Auckland
Norway	Siri Nilsen	21	Oslo
Okinawa	Yoneko Kiyan	19	Okinawa
Panama	Dionisia Broce	19	Panama City
Paraguay	Mirtha Martínez	18	Alto Paraguay
Peru	Madeleine Hartog-Bel	20	Piura
Philippines	Clarinda Soriano	20	Bacoor
Puerto Rico	Carol Barajadas	18	Santurce
Scotland	Linda Lees	20	Glasgow
Singapore	Margaret van Meel	19	Singapore
South Africa	Lynn de Jager	19	Pretoria
South Korea	Gui-young Yoon	19	Seoul
Spain	Paquita Torres	18	Málaga
Suriname	Joyce Leysner	22	Paramaribo
Sweden	Margareta Arvidsson	18	Gothenburg
Switzerland	Hedy Frick	18	Schwyz
Thailand	Cheranand Savetanand	24	Surat Thani
Trinidad and Tobago	Kathleen Hares	20	Port of Spain
Turkey	Nilgün Arslaner	18	Istanbul
United States	Maria Remenyi	20	El Cerrito
Venezuela	Magaly Castro	18	Calabozo
Wales	Christine Heller	22	Cardiff
West Germany	Marion Heinrich	19	Mönchengladbach
