= Rajkanya =

Rajkanya (lit. 'princess') may refer to these Indian films:

- Rajkanya (1955 film), a 1955 Bollywood film
- Rajkanya (1965 film), a 1965 Bengali film

== See also ==
- Raja (disambiguation)
- Kanya (disambiguation)
