= Prapussorn Panichkul =

Thai beauty pageant contestant (born 1949)

- Born: Prapussorn Panichkul; March 25, 1949 (age 77); Phetchaburi, Thailand
- Other name: Dang
- Beauty pageant titleholder
- Title: Miss Thailand 1966
- Hair color: Black
- Eye color: Black

Chitprapussorn Thiansuwan (Thai: จิตประภัสสร เทียนสุวรรณ; RTGS: Chitpraphatson Thiansuwan) née Prapussorn Panichkul (Thai: ประภัสสร พานิชกุล; RTGS: Praphatson Phanitchakun), nicknamed Dang (Thai: แดง; RTGS: Daeng; born March 25, 1949, in Phetchaburi, Thailand) is Miss Thailand 1966.

Preceded by Cheranand Savetanand	Miss Thailand; Miss Thailand 1966	Succeeded by Apantree Prayutsenee
