= Jang Yoon-jeong (Miss Korea) =

South Korean model (born 1970)

- Hangul: 장윤정
- Hanja: 張允貞
- RR: Jang Yunjeong
- MR: Chang Yunjŏng

Jang Yoon-jeong (Korean: 장윤정; born August 16, 1970) is a South Korean actress, TV host and beauty pageant titleholder who was named Miss Korea 1987. She represented South Korea and was the first runner-up of the Miss Universe 1988 beauty contest. Porntip Nakhirunkanok was the winner of the competition.

Jang was born in Daegu, South Korea.

== Miss Universe 1988 ==
After the preliminaries, Jang Yoon-jeong was the highest-placed Asian delegate who ranked third behind the US and Dominican Republic. During the actual pageant, she placed 1st runner-up (second place) behind Thailand's Bui Simon. At the time of the Miss Universe 1988 pageant, she was a high school student studying dance. Korea has never won Miss Universe. Jang is the closest a Korean woman has come to winning since debuting in 1954. It would not be until 18 years later that a Korean woman (Lee Hanee) placed as third runner-up. Miss Universe 1988 was historic: 4 out of 5 contestants were from Asian countries, only the delegate of Mexico, Amanda Olivares was from the American region.

== Filmography ==
=== Web series ===
Year	Title	Role	Ref.
2022	Blooming	Park Hae-young	

Preceded by Kim Ji-eun	Miss Korea; 1987	Succeeded by Kim Sung-ryung
