= College of Local Administration, Khon Kaen University =

College in Khon Kaen, Thailand

College of Local Administration, Khon Kaen University or COLA (Thai: วิทยาลัยการปกครองท้องถิ่น) is a degree-awarding college of Khon Kaen University (KKU), located in Khon Kaen, Thailand. The college was established on April 4, 2007, and now offers 5 degree programs: Bachelor of Public Administration in Local Government, Bachelor of Public Administration in Fiscal Management, Bachelor of Technology in Construction and Urban Management, Master of Public Administration in Local Government, and Doctor of Public Administration in Public Affairs Management.

== List of deans ==
1. Associate Professor Dr. Peerasit Kamnuansilpa (2007–2011, 2020–present)
2. Associate Professor Dr. Supawatanakorn Wongthanavasu (2011–2020)
