= Apasra Hongsakula =

Thai model and beauty queen (born 1947)

- อาภัสรา หงสกุล
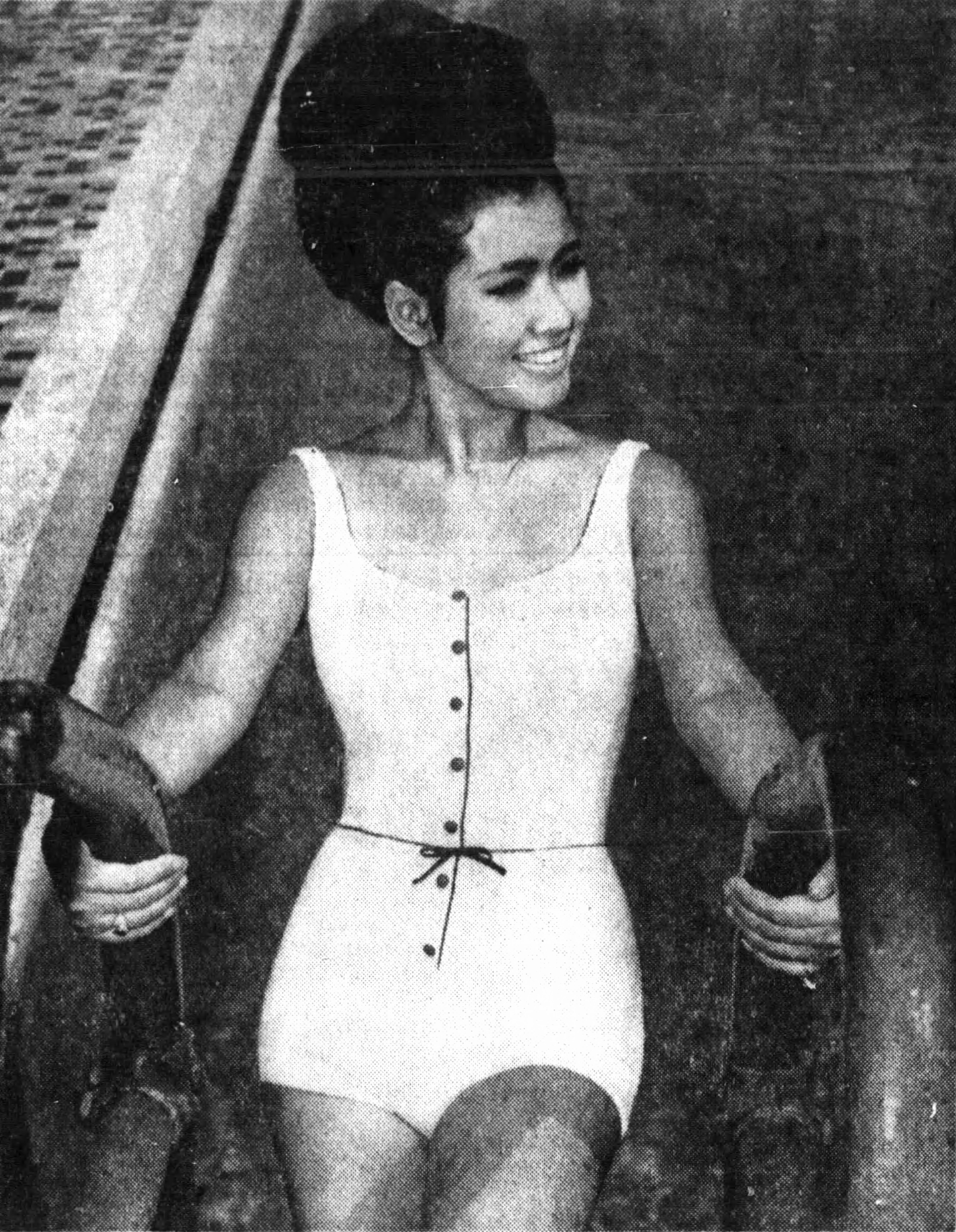
- Hongsakula in Miami in 1966
- Born: January 16, 1947 (age 79); Bangkok, Thailand
- Other names: Aphatsara Hongsakun; Pook (personal nickname)
- Height: 5 ft 4 in (1.63 m)
- Spouses: M.R. Kieatikhun Kitiyakara (m. 1967; div. 1969) Suthikiati Chirathivat (m. 1985; div. 1995)
- Children: 2
- Beauty pageant titleholder
- Title: Miss Thailand 1964; Miss Universe 1965
- Hair color: Black
- Eye color: Brown
- Major competitions: Miss Thailand 1964 (Winner); Miss Universe 1965 (Winner)

Apasra Hongsakula (Thai: อาภัสรา หงสกุล, RTGS: Aphatsara Hongsakun, pronounced [ʔàː.pʰát.sā.rāː hǒŋ.sā.kūn]; born January 16, 1947) is a Thai businesswoman and beauty queen who won the title of Miss Universe 1965. She is a daughter of Group Captain Perm and Kayoon Hongsakula. She was the first woman from Thailand and the first Southeast Asian to win the Miss Universe title.

== Biography ==
Apasra was born and raised in Bangkok, and sent to learn English at a girls secondary school in Penang.

She married the first cousin of Queen Sirikit, by whom she has a son. The marriage ended long ago in divorce, but she remains a revered social figure in the country. Her younger sister, Paveena, is a prominent political figure and former member of Thai parliament.

Her son, Passakorn, from her second marriage with Chirathivat, who in 2017 became chairman of the board of directors of Bangkok Post, got officially married to Rasri Balenciaga on December 8, 2017, in a ceremony presided over by former crownprincess Soamsawali. She has 3 grandchildren.

== Pageantry ==
=== Participation ===
In the 1964 Miss Thailand pageant held in Bangkok, Apasra Hongsakula, a 17 year old high school student from Penang, won the crown. She went on to compete in the 1965 Miss Universe pageant held in Miami Beach, Florida, United States where she was crowned 14th Miss Universe winner on July 28, 1965.

=== Judging ===
She returned to the pageant as a judge in 1973 and 1979.

== Post pageants ==
- Apasra was appointed "cultural ambassador" by Tourism Authority of Thailand.
- President of Raymond Weil Watches (Thailand)
- President of Apasra Beauty Slimming Spa

== Facts and trivia ==
- She is the third Thai representative at Miss Universe pageant.
- She got some advice from Queen Sirikit about how to strike a pose and how to walk in the pageant before she went to Miami.
- Apasra was presented a new crown by Miss Universe Organization and was crowned again at a private function by Miss Universe 1991 Lupita Jones of Mexico in 1992 when Thailand hosted the 1992 Miss Universe pageant. Most Miss Universe titleholders in the old days did not get to keep the crown.
- There were five girls born in the United States in 1965 who were named Apasara after her.

Awards and achievements
Preceded by (Greece) Corinna Tsopei	Miss Universe; 1965	Succeeded by (Sweden) Margareta Arvidsson
Preceded by Sucheela Srisomboon	Miss Thailand; 1964	Succeeded by Cheranand Savetanand
