= Areeya Chumsai =

American film director

Areeya Sirisopa
- อารียา สิริโสภา
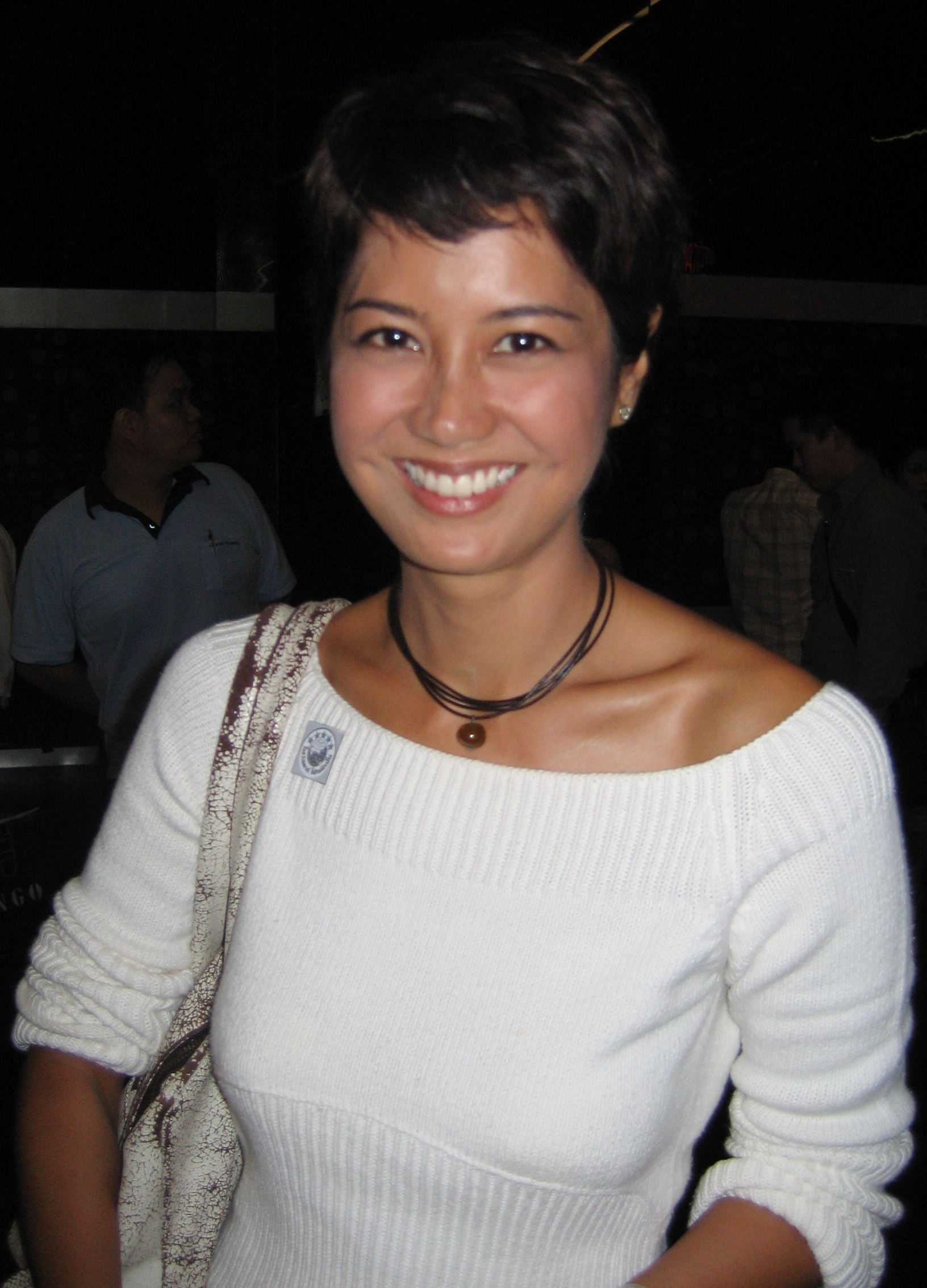
- Areeya attends the press screening for the film Ploy in June 2007 in Bangkok.
- Born: June 28, 1971 (age 53); Ann Arbor, Michigan, U.S.
- Other names: Pop (ป็อป)
- Education: Michigan State University
- Occupations: Film director; producer; army officer; lecturer; actress

Areeya Chumsai

Military service
- Allegiance: Thailand
- Branch/service: Royal Thai Army
- Rank: Lieutenant

Areeya Sirisopa (Thai: อารียา สิริโสภา; RTGS: Ariya Sirisopha) or Areeya Chumsai (Thai: อารียา ชุมสาย; nicknamed "Pop"(Thai: ป็อป, born June 28, 1971)) is an American-Thai model, lecturer, director and beauty pageant titleholder.

== Early life and education ==
Chumsai was born in Ann Arbor, Michigan, the United States, the daughter of Thai immigrants. She spent her childhood and adolescent years in the state of Michigan. She attended high school at warren Fitzgerald and later received a degree in journalism from Michigan State University in 1993. The family's original surname had been changed in the USA to "Chumsai", the name of a branch of the Thai royal family deriving from a son of King Rama III; the true Chumsai (also Jumsai) family demanded she change it, feeling she was attempting to pass herself off as being a member of a high-society family despite having no connection to them. She later adopted the surname Sirisopa.

== Pageantry ==
Upon completion of her undergraduate studies, she traveled to Thailand to visit relatives and found a side job as a model for various fashion magazines. Within a year, she qualified for the Miss Thailand pageant and won the crown in 1994. She went on to compete in the Miss Universe pageant held in the Philippines, placing 13th overall, and being the recipient of the "Best Kodak Smile".

During her reign as Miss Thailand, she began working as a model, actress, and emcee.

== Career ==
=== Teaching career ===
Upon completion of her reign as Miss Thailand, Areeya went on to teach English and writing to Thai students at Bangkok University and later Chulalongkorn University. In 1995, while teaching English to Thai soldiers at the Chulachomklao Royal Military Academy she became a military officer with the rank of Second Lieutenant. Her experiences in the military were later described in her book "Bootcamp". She also wrote a column for the Thai fashion magazine Praew and continued to model. In 1999, she worked as a spokesperson/model for Hitachi, Ltd., appearing in both print and television advertisements. In 2000, she became the first Thai woman to receive the 13th Tokyo Creation Award, awarded for her social service.

=== Filmmaker and current activities ===
In 2005, she co-directed alongside Nisa Kongsri the film Innocence (Dek toh), which documented the schooling and lives of the hill tribe children in northern Thailand. Chumsai and Kongsri lived among the hill tribe people for months as teachers and students lived together growing crops, cooking meals, and continuing the education process. The film opened to positive reviews and has been shown in several film festivals throughout the world, receiving several accolades including most recently the EIDF2006 "Spirit Award" in Korea. Proceeds from the film have gone to the hill tribe children; in addition, Chumsai and Kongsri have continued to raise awareness across the country and through their charity work.

Preceded by Chattharika Ubolsiri	Miss Thailand; 1994	Succeeded by Phavadee Vichienrat
