= Innocence (2005 film) =

- The English-language movie poster.
- Directed by: Areeya Chumsai; Nisa Kongsri
- Produced by: Areeya Chumsai
- Cinematography: Nisa Kongsri
- Edited by: Nisa Kongsri; Dungaporn Pakavirojukil
- Release dates: October 2005 (South Korea); December 2005 (Thailand)
- Running time: 100 minutes
- Country: Thailand
- Language: Thai

Innocence (Thai: เด็กโต๋, or Dek To), is a 2005 Thai independent documentary film directed by Areeya Chumsai and Nisa Kongsri about a boarding school for hill tribe children in Chiang Mai Province, Thailand.

The film had its world premiere at the 2005 Pusan International Film Festival.

== Summary ==
Shot on digital video, the documentary tells the story of Prayoon Kamchai, principal of the Baan Mae Toh school in rural, mountainous Chiang Mai Province. Faced with poor families of hill tribe (mostly Karen and Hmong) subsistence farmers and rugged terrain, Prayoon sought to find a way to ensure children in his far-flung school district received a proper education. Children would often have to travel 80 to 90 kilometers on narrow, winding mountain roads, which in the rainy season became impassable, to get to school. Often, children's parents were too poor to afford tuition.

Prayoon, who asked to be assigned to the school when he started teaching in 1983, at first noticed the children had no food, so he decided to start a free lunch program. He then solved the problem of transportation by creating a boarding school and finding a way for as many children to attend as the school could accept.

The school receives a small amount of funds from the Thai government. Building supplies for the boarding school dorms were donated, and much of the building work and other improvements at the school were made by the students and teachers themselves. To supplement the small meal allowance from the government, the students raise their own vegetable crops and livestock.

Baan Mae Toh school offers classes up to Mattayom 3, or ninth grade. As a reward for graduating from the school, Prayoon arranges for the class to take a trip to the beach in Prachuap Khiri Khan Province, a trip of more than 1,000 kilometers that takes three days, by truck and bus. For all the children, it is the first time they will see the ocean. Along the way, the children stay at Buddhist temples for free to keep the cost of the journey low.

== Production ==
Producer-director Areeya Chumsai is a Thai-American model who was Miss Thailand Universe 1994. She then moved to Thailand permanently, became an officer in the Royal Thai Army and taught English at the army's military academy, as well as writing magazine columns and books. Co-director, principal cinematographer and editor Nisa Kongsri had worked as an assistant director, working on such films as Siam Renaissance and One Night Husband. Phanjanit Garnploog produced and edited an international version of the film. Areeya, wanting to research her idea for a film about hill tribe children, contacted Nisa for help. The two formed a partnership and developed a screenplay for Innocence, which was selected for presentation at the 2003 Pusan International Film Festival.

== Reception ==
=== Impact ===
When Innocence was released, the Thai government had made cuts to its education budget, reducing student meal allowances from 20 baht a day to 12 baht. Coverage of the film in the Thai media brought attention to the issue and the government rescinded the cuts. Proceeds from the film and a fund-raising campaign have also gone to support the school.

=== Critical reception ===
Kong Rithdee of the Bangkok Post mentioned Innocence in his recap of Thai films released in 2005, saying the documentary supplied "meaty stuff to the multiplexes usually swamped with feature films ... [it helped] pry open the door for the release of alternative cinema and refreshed the audience's perception that documentaries do deserve a space on the big screen.".

=== Festivals and awards ===
The film had its world premiere at the Pusan International Film Festival, where it was screened in the "Wide Angle" program. It then had a limited run in Bangkok cinemas, and was also screened at the 2006 Bangkok International Film Festival. At the CineMekong Film Festival, organized by the Alliance française in Phnom Penh, it was awarded the Prix de la Diversite Culturelle. The film was then screened at the EBS International Documentary Festival in Seoul, where it won the Spirit Award. In November 2006, the filmmakers did a tour of film festivals in Europe, screening Innocence at the Lyon Asian Film Festival, the International Film Festival for Children and Youth in Madrid and the Festival des 3 Continents in Nantes.
