= Kanok-orn Bunma =

Thai beauty pageant contestant (born 1952)

- Born: Watcharee Phowma; September 8, 1952 (age 74); Chachoengsao, Thailand
- Height: 5 ft 3 in (1.60 m)
- Beauty pageant titleholder
- Title: Miss Thailand 1972
- Hair color: Black
- Eye color: Black
- Major competitions: Miss Thailand 1972 (winner), Miss Universe 1973 (Delegetes)

Kanok-orn Bunma (Thai: กนกอร บุญมา; RTGS: Kanok-on Bunma; born September 8, 1952, in Chachoengsao, Thailand) is a Thai beauty pageant titleholder who won Miss Thailand 1972. she competed in Miss Universe 1973 pageant competition held in Athens.

On May 18, 1975, she married Suwit Pongjaruspan businessman and currently she work at gas station business in Nakhon Ratchasima.

Preceded by Nipapat Sudsiri	Miss Thailand; Miss Thailand 1972	Succeeded by Savinee Pakaranang
