= Chutima Naiyana =

Thai beauty queen and actress (born 1967)

- Born: Umaporn Naiyananon; August 10, 1967 (age 59); Chonburi, Thailand
- Height: 5 ft 5 in (1.65 m)
- Beauty pageant titleholder
- Title: Miss Thailand 1987
- Hair color: Black
- Eye color: Black
- Major competitions: Miss Thailand 1987 (winner), Miss Universe 1987 (Delegetes)

Chutima Naiyana (Thai: ชุติมา นัยนา), nicknamed Ae (Thai: เอ้) (born August 10, 1967 in Chonburi, Thailand) is a Thai actress, musician and beauty pageant titleholder who won Miss Thailand 1987.

Preceded by Taweeporn Klungploy	Miss Thailand; Miss Thailand 1987	Succeeded by Porntip Nakhirunkanok
