= Nipapat Sudsiri =

Thai model (born 1950)

- Born: Nipapat Sudsiri; April 9, 1950 (age 76); Kanchanaburi, Thailand
- Height: 5 ft 7 in (1.70 m)
- Beauty pageant titleholder
- Title: Miss Thailand 1971
- Hair color: Black
- Eye color: Black
- Major competitions: Miss Thailand 1971 (winner), Miss Universe 1972 (Delegetes)

Nipapat Sudsiri (Thai: นิภาภัทร สุดศิริ; RTGS: Niphaphat Sutsiri), nicknamed Lek (Thai: เล็ก) (born April 9, 1950) is a Thai businesswowan and beauty pageant titleholder who was crowned Miss Thailand 1971. she competed in the Miss Universe 1972 pageant competition held in Puerto Rico.

She married businessman Jatuporn Sihanatkathakul, and currently she works in the hotel business.

Preceded by Warunee Sangsirinavin	Miss Thailand; Miss Thailand 1971	Succeeded by Kanok-orn Bunma
