= Khon Kaen University =

University in Thailand

- มหาวิทยาลัยขอนแก่น
- Motto: "Vidyā Cariyā Paññā" (both Thai and Pali)
- Motto in English: "Knowledge, Virtues, Wisdom"
- Type: National
- Established: 25 January 1966; 60 years ago
- Affiliations: ASAIHL
- Endowment: ฿ 5 Billion (2022)
- President: Assoc. Prof. Chanchai Phanthongviriyakul, M.D.
- Royal conferrer: Maha Chakri Sirindhorn, Princess Royal of Thailand on behalf of the King
- Administrative staff: 2,075 (2007)
- Students: 39,684 (2021)
- Location: Khon Kaen, Thailand
- Symbolic tree: Cassia bakeriana
- Colors: Brownish-red
- Website: www.kku.ac.th

Khon Kaen University (Thai: มหาวิทยาลัยขอนแก่น; KKU) is a public research university. The university was the first institution of higher education in the northeastern Thailand and remains the oldest and the most competitive university in the region. The university is a hub of education in northeast Thailand. It is a widely recognized university in Asia with strong emphasis on medicine, engineering, science, agriculture and social science. Khon Kaen University was ranked 21st in Southeast Asia by Time Higher Education in 2009, and 4th in Thailand by The Office of Higher Education Commission.

== History ==
In 1941 during the reign of King Ananda Mahidol with the government of Field Marshal Plaek Phibunsongkhram as Prime Minister, there have been policies and projects to expand higher education to the provinces. For the northeastern region, a university have been established in Ubon Ratchathani Province but the war in East Asia which the government had to decide to join Japan to fight the Allies. As a result, the establishment of a university in the northeastern region ended in 1960. Under the administration of Prime Minister Sarit Thanarat, there has been a review of the establishment of the university once again.

Later in the year 1962, it was resolved to establish a higher education institution. Engineering and agriculture in Khon Kaen nominate this institute as "Khon Kaen Institute of Technology" with the abbreviation K.I.T. After that its name was changed to be "Northeastern University" or N.E.U". At that time there was no government agency directly responsible for conducting university education. Therefore, the government has decided that the National Education Council should be responsible for finding a place, drafting a course as well as contacting foreign aids.

In 1963, the subcommittee agreed to choose Baan Si Than as the location of the university in an area of approximately 5,500 rai (2,173 acres), 4 kilometers from the city of Khon Kaen. On 9 June 1964, building construction of "Faculty of Science and Arts" was settled. The first batch of the students was accepted at the University Office in Bangkok on 24 June 1964 with a total number of 107 students, separating into 49 agricultural science students and 58 engineering students enrolled at the University of Medical Sciences (current Mahidol University).

University rankings

Global – Overall
- QS World: 901-950 (2026)

Regional – Overall
- QS Asia: 186 (2025)

In 1965, the cabinet resolved to change the name as "Khon Kaen University" which is the city's name and location, and Khon Kaen University became legal entity since then.

In 1966, the parliament enacted the Khon Kaen University Act, and announced the establishment in the Government Gazette on January 25, 1966, which is considered the university's founding day. The King Bhumibol Adulyadej appointed qualified members of the university board. Prime Minister Thanom Kittikachorn and Khon Kaen University Council members held a meeting and appointed Pote Sarasin as the first president of the university.

== Faculty ==
There are 19 faculties and 4 colleges in three disciplines.

Healthcare Science

- Faculty of Associated Medical Sciences
- Faculty of Dentistry
- Faculty of Medicine
- Faculty of Nursing
- Faculty of Pharmacy
- Faculty of Veterinary Medicine
- Faculty of Public Health

Science and Technology

- Faculty of Agriculture
- Faculty of Technology
- Faculty of Architecture
- Faculty of Engineering
- Faculty of Science
- College of Computing

Liberal Arts and Social Sciences

- Faculty of Education
- Faculty of Humanities and Social Sciences
- Faculty of Business Administration and Accountancy
- Faculty of Fine Arts
- Faculty of Law
- Faculty of Economics
- College of Local Administration
- KKU International College
- College of Graduate Study in Management
- Faculty of Interdisciplinary Studies (Nongkhai Campus)

== Award and rankings ==
2010 Khon Kaen University was rated as one of the 9 National Research Universities of Thailand.

Ranking : Domestic (International)
Institute	2019	2018	2017	2016	2015	2014	2013	2012	2011
Times Higher Education (Social Impact Ranking)	1(101–200)	-	-	-	-	-	-	-	-
QS World University Rankings	6(148)	7(178)	7(165)	6(171–180)	-	-	-	-	-
URAP	-	4(903)	5(896)	4(854)	4(832)	4(838)	4(802)	5(805)	6(888)
Webometrics	5(873)	-	-	-	-	-	-	-	-
SIR	4(388)	4(388)	4(394)	5(396)	6(399)	7(399)	6(414)	8(453)	11(508)
CWTS	4(1477)	4(1396)	4(1291)	4(1149)	-	-	-	-	-
Nature Index	-	13	6	17	-	-	-	-	-

== Notable alumni ==
- Jatupat Boonpattararaksa: social activist
- Sukollawat Kanaros: actor
- Watcharin Kasalak: President of Burapha University
- Somsak Kiatsuranont: former Speaker of the House of Representatives of Thailand
- Chanchai Panthongwiriyakul: President of Khon Kaen University
- Niane Sivongxay: herpetologist
- Tanwarin Sukkhapisit: film director and politician
- Witoon Suriyawanakul : billionaire and Founder of Siam Global House Pcl
- Harin Suthamjarus: singer of Tattoo Colour
- Apisamai Srirangsan: psychiatrist and news anchor
- Surapong Tovichakchaikul: former Minister of Foreign Affairs and Deputy Prime Minister of Thailand
- Taweesin Visanuyothin: psychiatrist
- Apichatpong Weerasethakul: film director, screenwriter, and film producer
- Wanarat Ratsameerat: actor
- Sirilak Kwong: actor
- Thanaboon Kiatniran: actor and singer-songwriter
