= Kanyaka =

Kanyaka may refer to:

- Kanyaka (magazine), an Indian women's magazine
- Kanyaka (film), a 1976 Indian film directed by J. Sasikumar
- Sri Kanyaka Parameshwari Temple, a temple in Shadnagar, Andhra Pradesh, India
- Kanyaka Kingdom, an ancient Indian kingdom
- Kanyaka, South Australia (disambiguation), articles associated with the town and locality

== See also ==
- Kanya (disambiguation)
