= Kanian =

Kanian may refer to:

- Kanian, Salmas, a village in Iran
- Martik Kanian, Iranian singer and songwriter

== See also ==
- Khanian (disambiguation)
- Kanya (disambiguation)
- Kaniyan or Kaniyar, a caste in south India
- Kaniyan, Shamli, a village in Uttar Pradesh, India
- Kaniyan Pungundranar, Indian philosopher
