= Yasmin Daji =

Indian model

- Born: 1947 (age 78–79); New York City, U.S.
- Occupations: Model, Doctor
- Height: 1.75 m (5 ft 9 in)
- Beauty pageant titleholder
- Title: Femina Miss India Universe 1966
- Major competitions: Femina Miss India 1966 (Winner) (Miss Beautiful Smile); Miss Universe 1966 (3rd Runner Up)

Yasmin Daji (born 1947) is an Indian doctor, model and beauty pageant titleholder. She was crowned Femina Miss India 1966. She represented India at Miss Universe 1966, where she was crowned 3rd Runner Up.

== Early life and education ==
She was born in 1947 in New York City. She moved to New Delhi, India and entered Lady Hardinge medical college.

== Pageantry ==
=== Femina Miss India 1966 ===
She entered Femina Miss India pageant in 1966. She was crowned the eventual winner. She also won Miss Beautiful Smile sub-award.

=== Miss Universe 1966 ===
She represented India at Miss Universe 1966 pageant and was declared third runner up.

== Personal life ==
After completing her reign as Miss India Universe and finishing her studies she returned to the United States and got married. She has two sons.

Awards and achievements
Preceded by (Sweden) Ingrid Norman	Miss Universe; 3rd Runner-Up; 1966	Succeeded by (Finland) Ritva Lehto
Preceded by Persis Khambatta	Femina Miss India; 1966	Succeeded by Nayyara Mirza
