= Miss Thailand =

Beauty contest

Miss Thailand นางสาวไทย
- Type: Beauty pageant
- Headquarters: Bangkok, Thailand
- Country represented: Thailand
- Qualifies for: Miss Cosmo
- First edition: 1934; 92 years ago
- Most recent edition: Miss Thailand 2026
- Current titleholder: Jiraporn Saladaeng; Udon Thani
- President: Piyaporn Sankosik
- Language: Thai; English
- Website: www.facebook.com/missthailand.tpn/

Miss Thailand (Thai: นางสาวไทย; RTGS: Nang Sao Thai), is a beauty pageant in Thailand for Thai women first officially held in 1934 under the name of Miss Siam (Thai: นางสาวสยาม; RTGS: Nang Sao Sayam). The first modern Thai beauty contest dates back to 1916. Since 2025, The winner of Miss Thailand pageant represents Thailand at Miss Cosmo.

The reigning Miss Thailand 2026 is Jiraporn Saladaeng from Udon Thani.

== History ==
The first modern Thai Beauty contest of Siam was in 1916. The 20 year-old Ratana Songkram was the first prize winner. This was held in Bangkok under auspices of a committee of leading merchants. There were upwards of 600 contestants. She was the daughter of Khava Songkram, a pottery maker, and was born and educated in Bangkok. She abstained from betel leaf chewing, since her teeth did not show the blackening effects of this habit. Ratana wore the much mooted panung. This was often proclaimed by tourists as the neatest and most comfortable of all Oriental garb. Her award consisted of a pair of costly pearl pendants, and her portrait appeared on various 1916 calendars in Siam. Songkram was a notable figure in early Siamese beauty pageantry before the official "Miss Siam" (later Miss Thailand from 1939 onwards) contest was established in 1934.

The inaugural Miss Siam pageant took place on 10 December 1934, in Phra Nakhon District of Bangkok. On hiatus during World War II, the competition resumed in 1948 as the Miss Thailand pageant.

The winner of Miss Thailand used to represent the country at Miss Universe, while 1st Runner-up presented at Miss Asia Pacific International. However, Miss Thailand Organization lost these licenses to Miss Thailand Universe in 2000. The last Miss Thailand to represent her country at Miss Universe 1999 is Apisamai Srirangsan, Miss Thailand 1999.

In 2019, Sireethorn Leearamwat, Miss Thailand 2019, represented the country at Miss International 2019 and won the title for the first time for Thailand.

Number of wins under Miss Thailand
Past franchises
Pageant	Title	Winning year(s)
Miss Universe	2	1965, 1988
Miss International	1	2019
Miss Asia Pacific	2	1988, 1997

== Broadcast ==
The beauty pageant was broadcast on BBTV Channel 7 until 1999, then moved to ITV, which later was transformed into TITV (Thailand Independent Television) until 2007.

Current Franchises
Membership	Year
Miss Cosmo	2025 – Present
Miss Planet International	2024 – Present
Miss Intercontinental	2024 – Present
Miss Face of Humanity	2023 – Present
Former Franchises
Membership	Year
Major international beauty pageant:
Miss Universe	1954 – 1999
Miss World	1968
Miss International	1968 – 2001, 2019
Minor international beauty pageant:
Miss Asia Pacific International	1985 – 1999
Miss Global	2023
Miss Charm	2020 – 2024
Miss Tourism Queen International	2016
Miss Queen of the Pacific	1967
Miss Flower Queen	1990
Miss Wonderland	1987 – 1989
World Miss University	1991

In 2008 until 2014, Miss Thailand pageant was broadcast on 9MCOT for the second time, back when the station is called Channel 4 Bang Khun Phrom was used to broadcast the pageant from 1965 and 1966 respectively. It was only brought back once more to broadcast the pageant in 2019.

In 2016 and 2020, Miss Thailand pageant was returned to broadcast on BBTV Channel 7.

From 2021 onwards, Miss Thailand pageant was broadcast on different channels instead of traditional broadcasters, most recently with MONO29 in 2026.

== International crowns ==
=== Titles ===
Note that the year designates the time Miss Thailand has acquired that particular pageant franchise.

== Titleholders ==
The following are the Miss Thailand titleholders throughout the years.

Year	Editions	Miss Siam	Hometown	Venue	Entrants
1916	Predecessor	Ratana Songkram	Phra Nakhon		600
1934	1st	Kanya Thiansawang	Phra Nakhon	Saranrom Park	Unknown
1935	2nd	Wani Laohakiat	Phra Nakhon	Saranrom Park	Unknown
1936	3rd	Wongduean Bhumiratna	Phra Nakhon	Saranrom Park	Unknown
1937	4th	Mayuri Wichaiwatthana	Phra Nakhon Si Ayutthaya	Saranrom Park	Unknown
1938	5th	Phitsamai Chotiwut	Phra Nakhon	Saranrom Park	Unknown

Year	Editions	Miss Thailand	Hometown	Venue	Entrants
1939	6th	Riam Petsayanawin	Phra Nakhon	Suan Ambhorn, Dusit palace	Unknown
1940	7th	Sawangchit Kharuehanon	Phra Nakhon	Unknown	Unknown
1941-1947; No pageant, due to World War II and mourning of King Ananda Mahidol of Thailand
1948	8th	Latda Suwansupha	Pattani	Suan Amporn, Dusit Palace	Unknown
1949; No pageant, due to Palace Rebellion
1950	9th	Amphon Burarak	Chiang Rai	Unknown	Unknown
1951	10th	Utsani Thongnuea-di	Samut Songkhram	Unknown	Unknown
1952	11th	Prachit Thong-urai	Phra Nakhon	Lumphini Park	Unknown
1953	12th	Anong Atchawatthana	Phra Nakhon	Lumphini Park	Unknown
1954	13th	Sucheela Srisomboon	Lamphun	Lumphini Park	Unknown
1955-1963; No pageant, due to the political problems in Thailand
1964	14th	Apasra Hongsakula	Phra Nakhon	Unknown	Unknown
1965	15th	Cheranand Savetanand	Surat Thani	Unknown	Unknown
1966	16th	Prapussorn Panichkul	Phetchaburi	Unknown	Unknown
1967	17th	Apantree Prayutsenee	Phra Nakhon	Unknown	Unknown
1968	18th	Sangduen Manwong	Phra Nakhon	Unknown	Unknown
1969	19th	Warunee Sangsirinavin	Phra Nakhon	Unknown	Unknown
1970; No pageant
1971	20th	Nipapat Sudsiri	Kanchanaburi	Unknown	Unknown
1972	21st	Kanok-orn Boonma	Chachoengsao	Unknown	Unknown
1973-1983; No pageant
1984	22nd	Savinee Pakaranang	Bangkok	Grand Palace Hostel Pattaya	Unknown
1985	23rd	Tarntip Pongsook	Nan	Siam Park	Unknown
1986	24th	Taweeporn Klungploy	Nakhon Sawan	Sofitel Centara Grand Bangkok	Unknown
1987	25th	Chutima Naiyana	Bangkok	Sofitel Centara Grand Bangkok	Unknown
1988	26th	Porntip Nakhirunkanok	Bangkok	Sofitel Centara Grand Bangkok	Unknown
1989	27th	Yonlada Ronghanam	Bangkok	Sofitel Centara Grand Bangkok	Unknown
1990	28th	Passaraporn Chaimongkol	Songkhla	Sofitel Centara Grand Bangkok	Unknown
1991	29th	Jiraprapa Sawettanan	Bangkok	Sofitel Centara Grand Bangkok	Unknown
1992	30th	Ornanong Panyawong	Chiang Mai	Sofitel Centara Grand Bangkok	Unknown
1993	31st	Chattarika Ubonsiri	Bangkok	Sofitel Centara Grand Bangkok	Unknown
1994	32nd	Areeya Chumsai	Bangkok	Sofitel Centara Grand Bangkok	Unknown
1995	33rd	Pavadee Wicheinrat	Bangkok	Queen Sirikit National Convention Center	Unknown
1996; No pageant, due to mourning of Princess Srinagarindra of Thailand
1997	34th	Sueangsuda Lawanprasert	Nakhon Nayok	Bangkok Convention Center, Ladprao	Unknown
1998	35th	Chalida Taochalee	Bangkok	Bangkok Convention Center, Ladprao	Unknown
1999	36th	Apisamai Srirangsan	Nakhon Pathom	Bangkok Convention Center, Ladprao	Unknown
2000	37th	Panadda Wongphudee	Bangkok	Queen Sirikit National Convention Center	Unknown
2001	38th	Sujira Arunpipat	Bangkok	Queen Sirikit National Convention Center	Unknown
2002	39th	Patiporn Sittipong	Chiang Mai	Queen Sirikit National Convention Center	Unknown
2003	40th	Chalisa Boonkrongsap	Lampang	Impact, Muang Thong Thani	Unknown
2004	41st	Sirinya Sattayasai	Bangkok	Suan Ambhorn, Dusit Palace	18
2005; No pageant, due to mourning of Southern of Thailand tsunami
2006	42nd	Lalana Kongtoranin	Bangkok	Thai Alangkarn Theater	18
2007	43rd	Angkana Trirattanathip	Bangkok	Royal Jubilee Ballroom	18
2008	44th	Panprapa Yongtrakul	Bangkok	Royal Paragon Hall	18
2009	45th	Ornwipa Kanoknateesawat	Saraburi	Aksra Theatre	18
2010	46th	Kritchaporn Homboonyasak	Chiang Mai	Aksra Theatre	18
2011; No pageant, due to the political issue of Thai general election
2012	47th	Prissana Kumpusiri	Bangkok	Changwattana Hall, Central Chaengwattana	18
2013	48th	Adcharaporn Kanoknateesavad	Bangkok	Aksra Theatre	18
2014	49th	Wilasini Chanwutthiwong	Bangkok	Aksra Theatre	24
2015; No pageant, due to the aftermath of the 2014 Thai coup d'état
2016	50th	Thanaporn Sriwirach	Phayao	GMM Live House at Central World	34
2017-2018; No pageant, due to mourning of King Bhumibol Adulyadej of Thailand
2019	51st	Sireethorn Leearamwat	Bangkok	Aksra Theatre	39
2020	52nd	Natthapat Pongpraphan	Nakhon Pathom	Chiang Mai International Exhibition and Convention Centre	30
2021; No pageant, due to the impact of COVID-19 pandemic
2022	53rd	Manita Farmer	Phuket	Central World Live	24
2023	54th	Chonnikarn Supittayaporn	Chiang Mai	Changwattana Hall, Central Chaengwattana	47
2024	55th	Panida Kernjinda	Chiang Mai	MCC Hall, The Mall Lifestore Ngamwongwan, Nonthaburi	34
2025	56th	Chotnapa Kaewjarun	Phra Nakhon Si Ayutthaya	MCC Hall, The Mall Lifestore Ngamwongwan, Nonthaburi	45
2026	57th	Jiraporn Saladaeng	Udon Thani	MCC Hall, The Mall Lifestore Ngamwongwan, Nonthaburi	39

=== Winners by province ===
Titles	Province	Winning years
31	Bangkok; Phra Nakhon (Old name)	1934, 1935, 1936, 1938, 1939, 1940, 1952, 1953, 1964, 1967, 1968, 1969, 1984, 1987, 1988, 1989, 1991, 1993, 1994, 1995, 1998, 2000, 2001, 2004, 2006, 2007, 2008, 2012, 2013, 2014, 2019
5	Chiang Mai	1992, 2002, 2010, 2023, 2024
2	Nakhon Pathom	1999, 2020
2	Phra Nakhon Si Ayutthaya	1937, 2025
1	Udon Thani	2026
1	Phuket	2022
1	Phayao	2016
1	Saraburi	2009
1	Lampang	2003
1	Nakhon Nayok	1997
1	Songkhla	1990
1	Nakhon Sawan	1986
1	Nan	1985
1	Chachoengsao	1972
1	Kanchanaburi	1971
1	Phetchaburi	1966
1	Surat Thani	1965
1	Lamphun	1954
1	Samut Songkhram	1951
1	Chiang Rai	1950
1	Pattani	1948

=== Gallery of winners ===
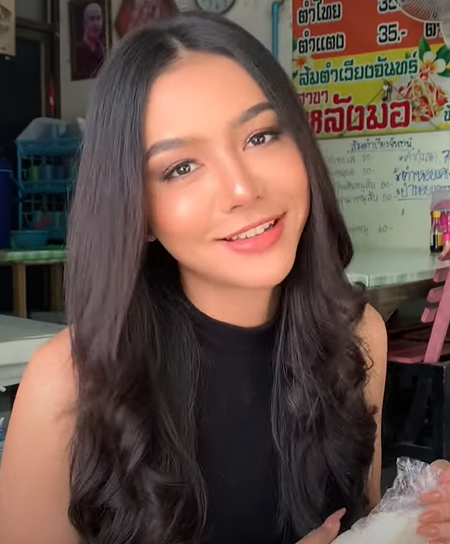
Miss Thailand 2024
Panida Kernjinda

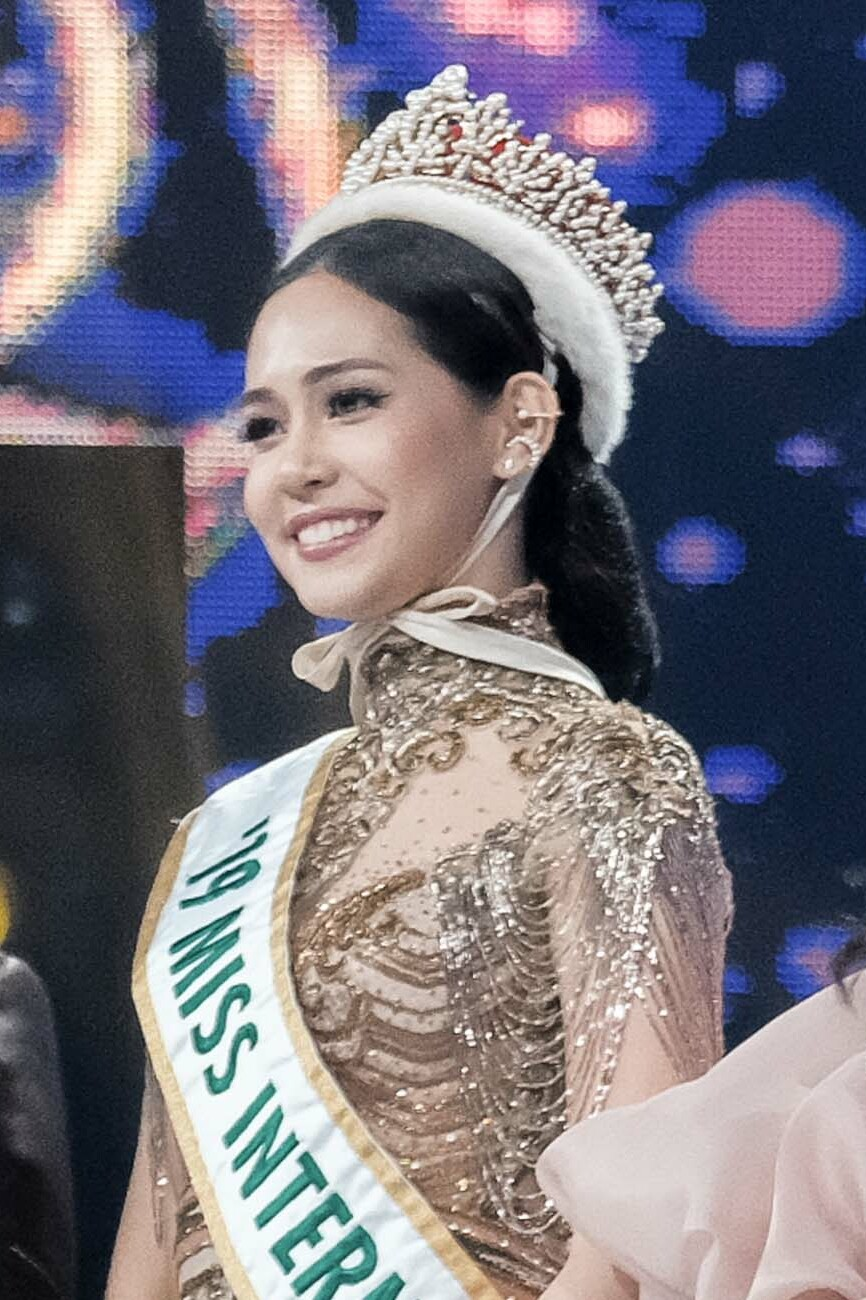
Miss Thailand 2019 and Miss International 2019
Sireethorn Leearamwat

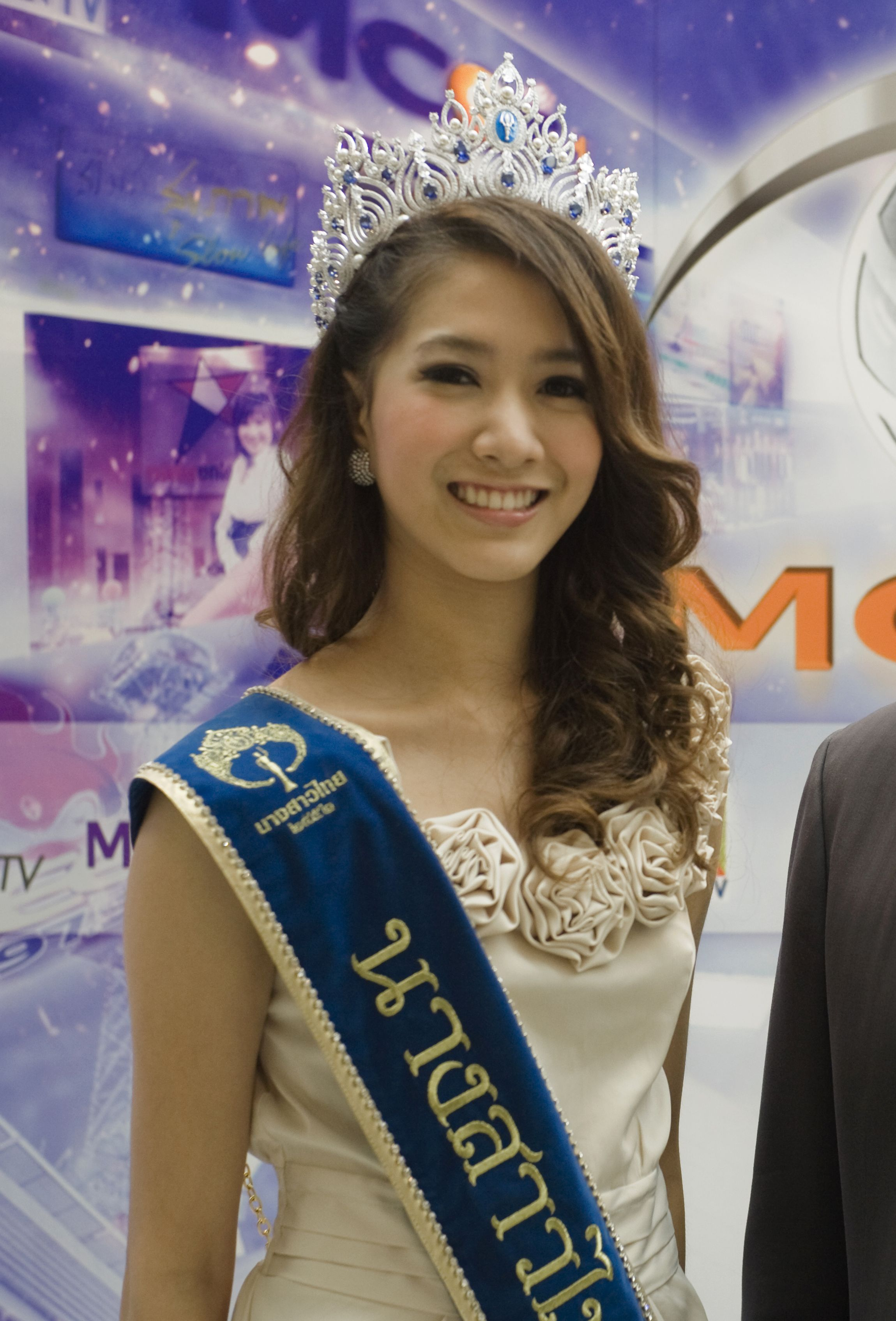
Miss Thailand 2009
Ornwipa Kanoknateesawat

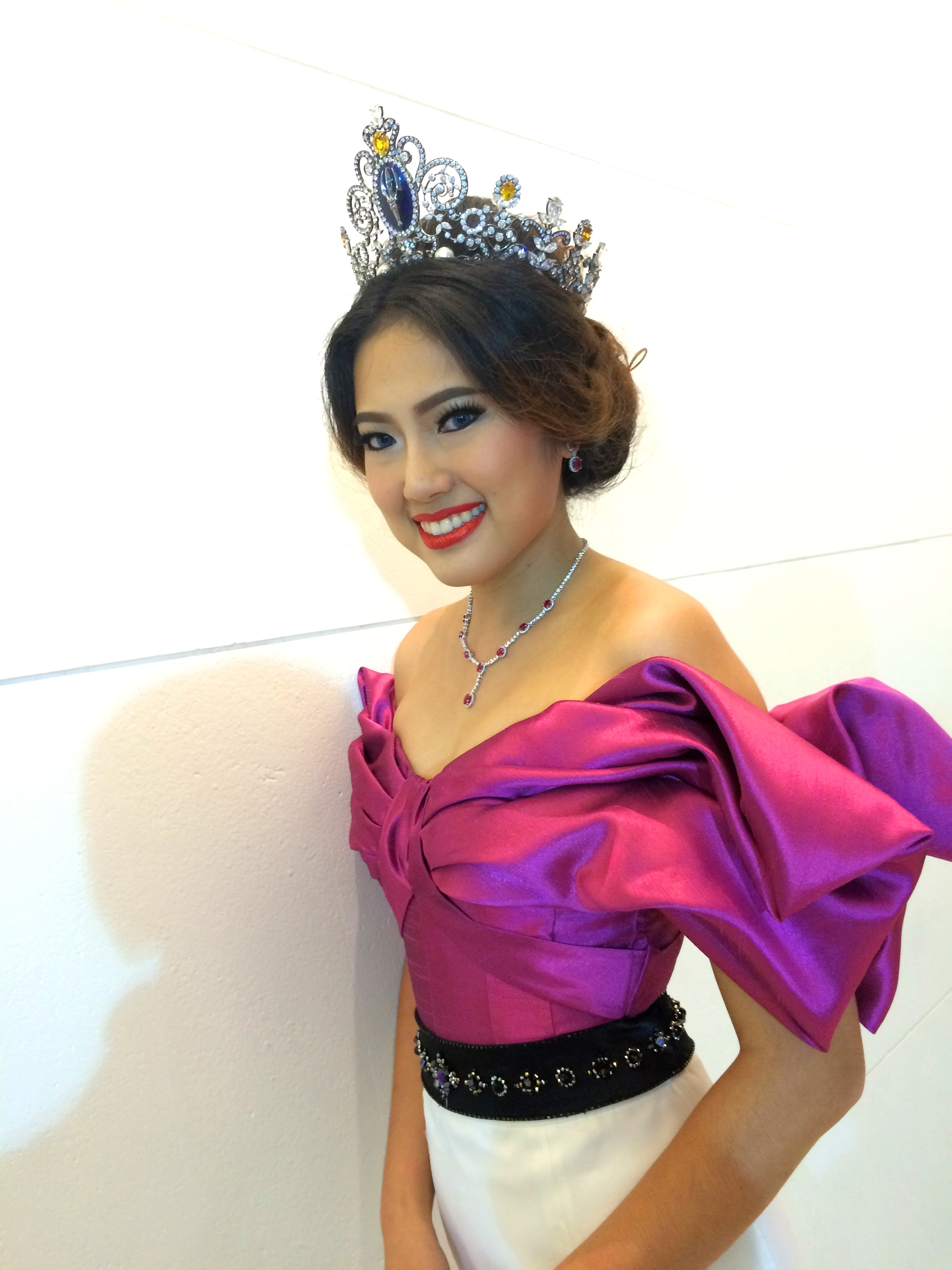
Miss Thailand 2007
Angkana Trirattanathip

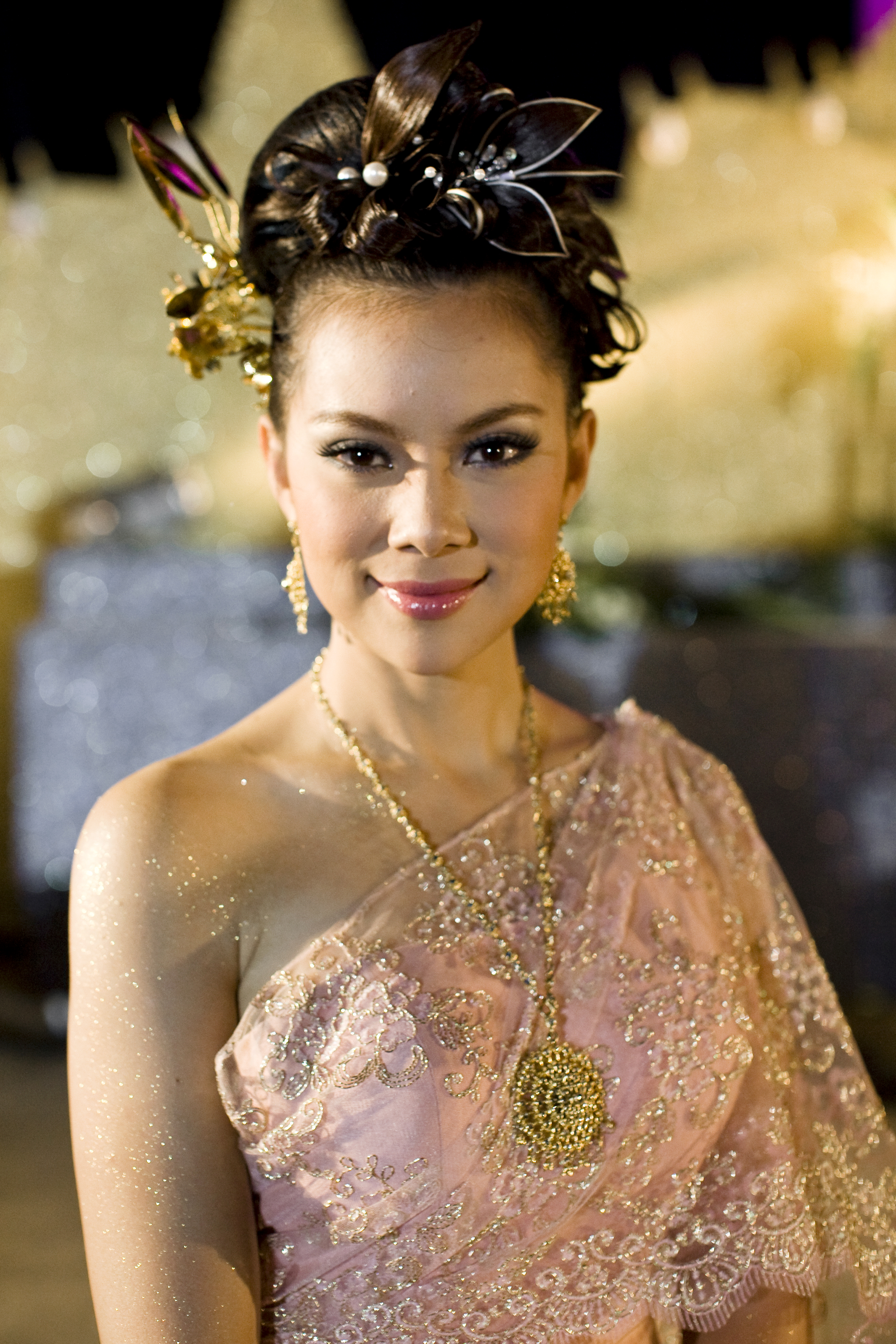
Miss Thailand 2000
Panadda Wongphudee

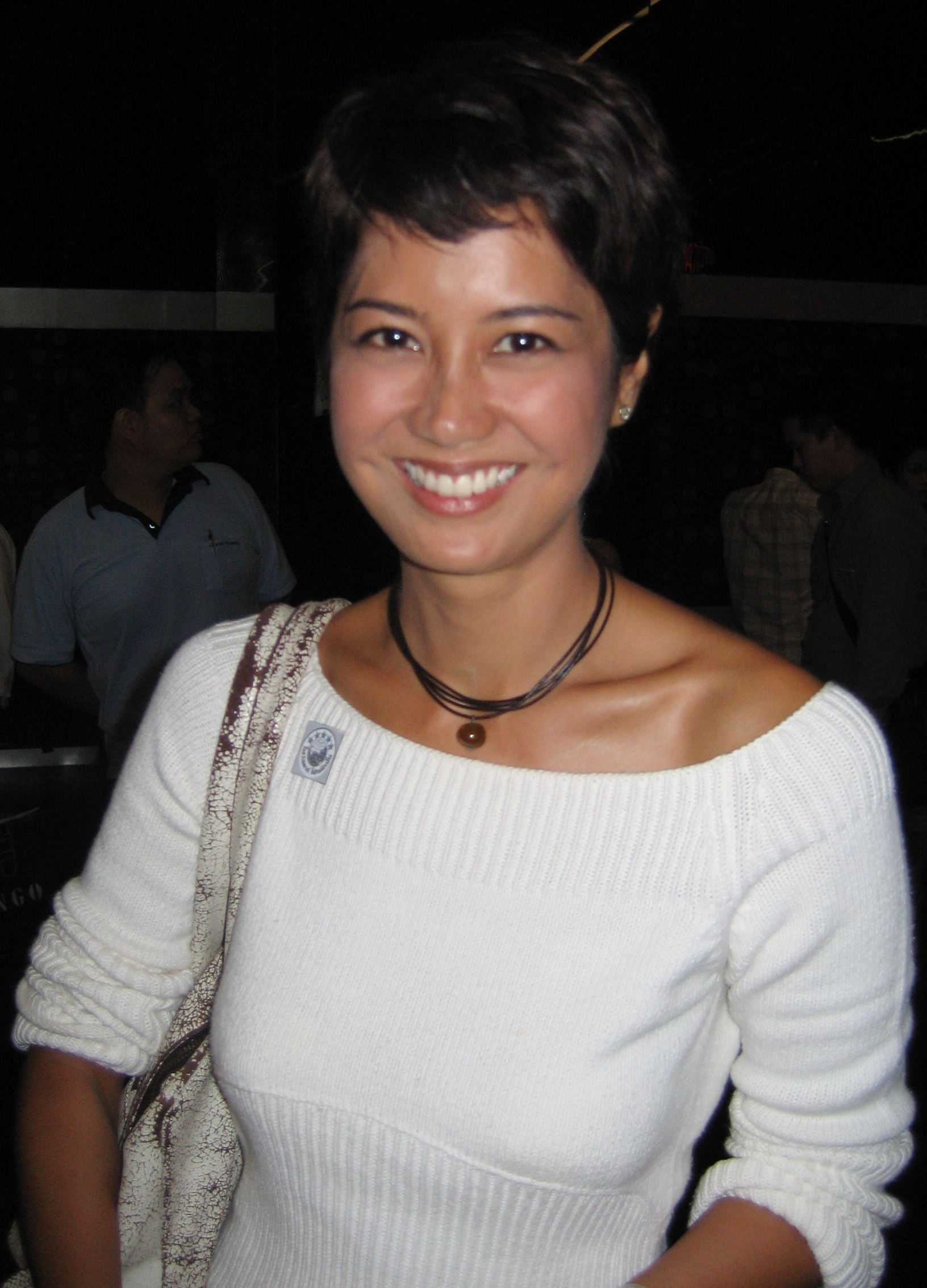
Miss Thailand 1994
Areeya Chumsai

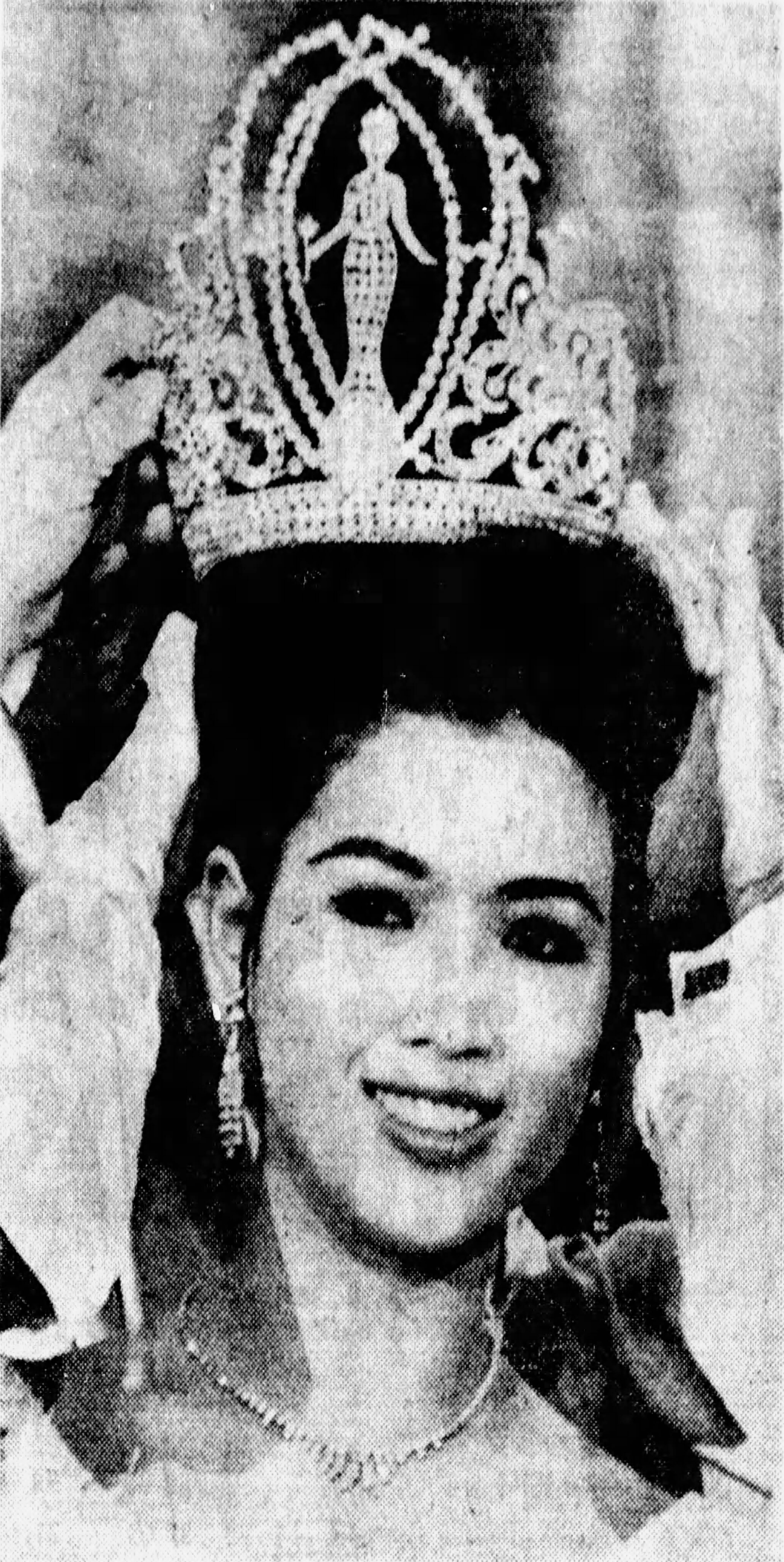
Miss Thailand 1964 and Miss Universe 1965
Apasra Hongsakula

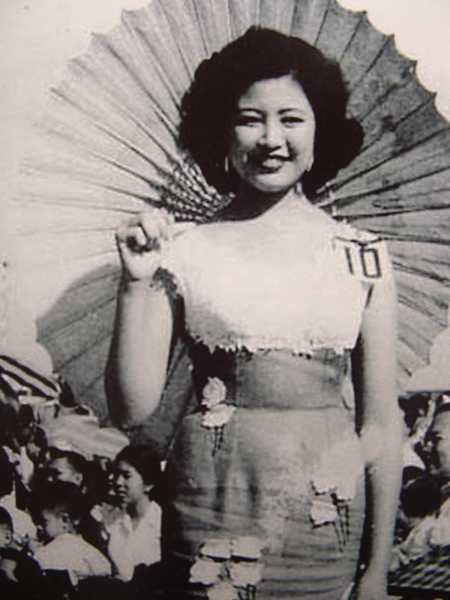
Miss Thailand 1954
Sucheela Srisomboon

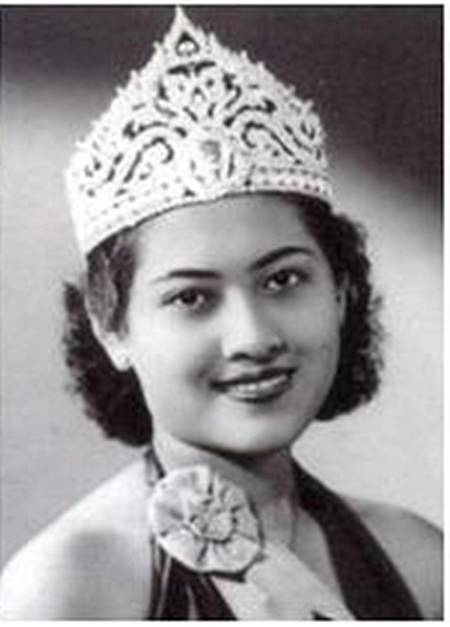
Miss Thailand 1939
Riam Petsayanawin

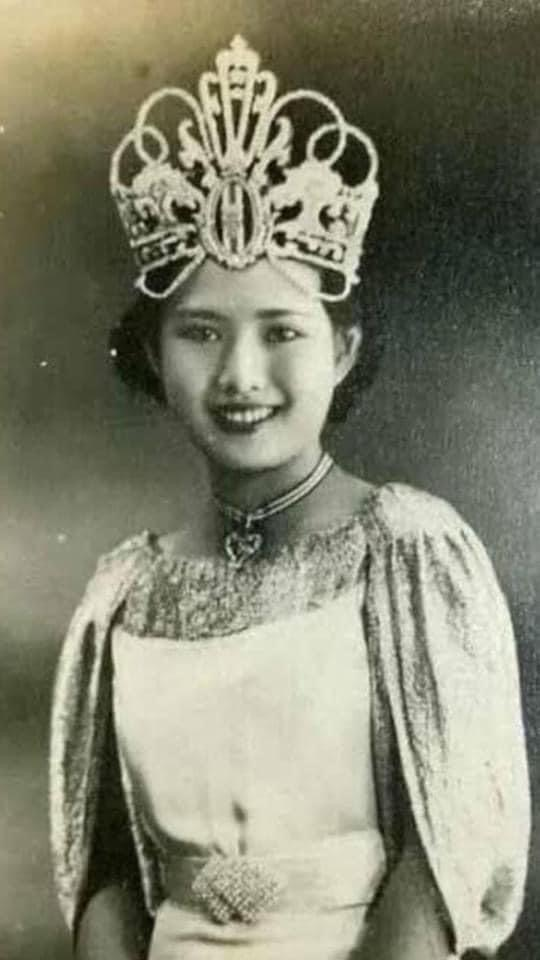
Miss Thailand 1935
Wani Laohakiat

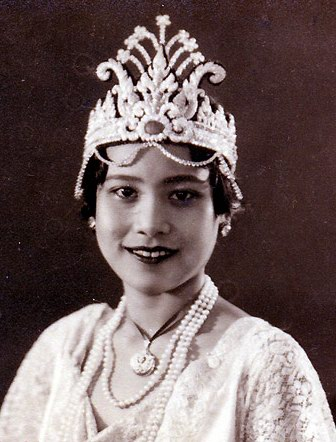
Miss Thailand 1934
Kanya Thiensawang

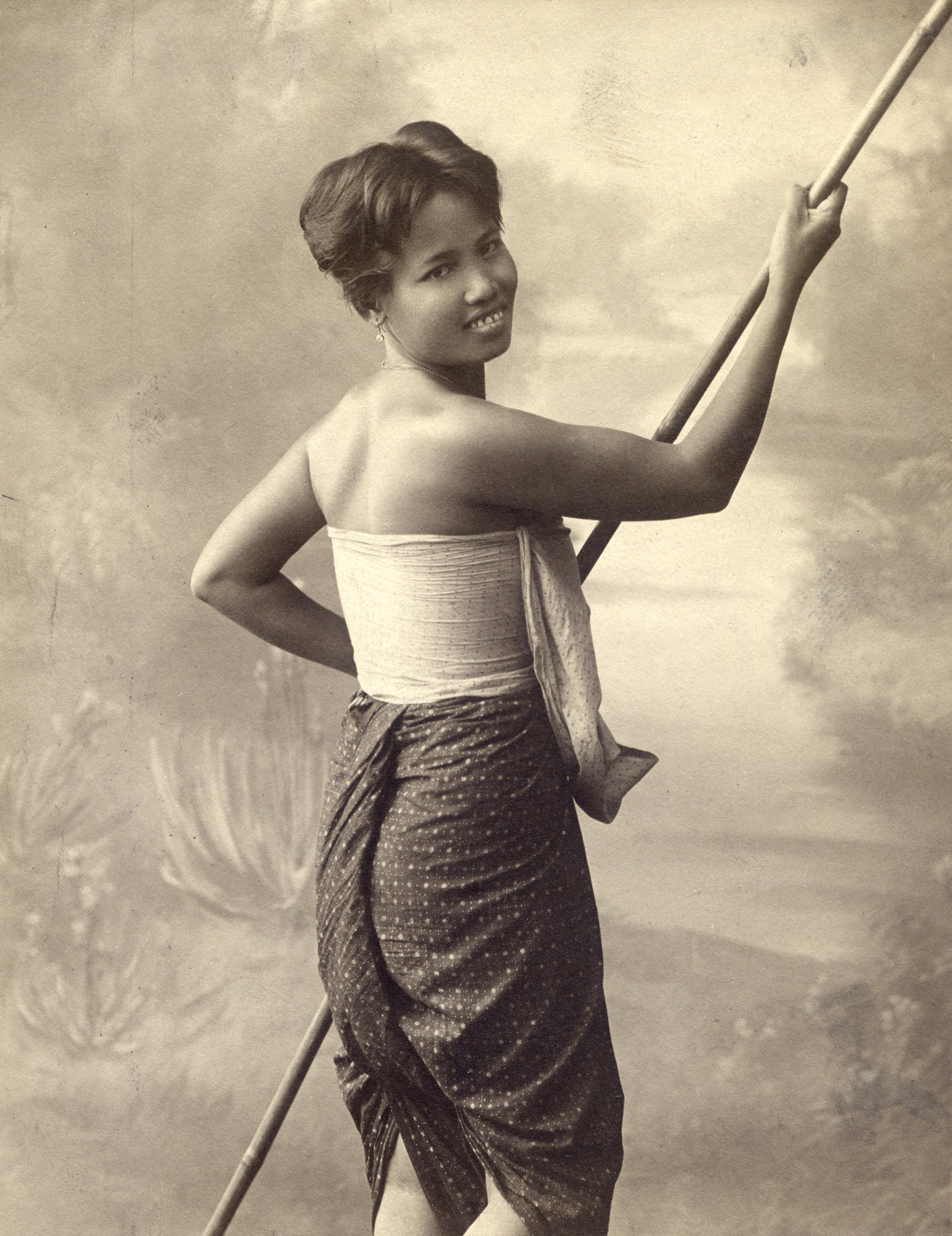
Thai Beauty Queen Ratana Songkram 1916

== Placements ==
=== Current franchise ===
Color keys

- : Declared as Winner
- : Ended as Runner-up
- : Ended as one of the Finalists
- : Ended as Special awards winner

==== Miss Cosmo ====
Year	Miss Cosmo Thailand	Hometowne	National Title	Competition performance		Ref.
Year	Miss Cosmo Thailand	Hometowne	National Title	Placement	Special award(s)	Ref.
2025	Chotnapa Kaewjarun	Phra Nakhon Si Ayutthaya	Miss Thailand 2025	Top 10		

==== Miss Planet International ====
Year	Miss Planet Thailand	Hometown	National Title	Competition performance		Ref.
Year	Miss Planet Thailand	Hometown	National Title	Placement	Special award(s)	Ref.
2024	Panida Kernjinda	Chiang Mai	Miss Thailand 2024	2nd Runner Up	2 Special Awards: Miss Elegance Body; Best Evening Gown	

==== Miss Intercontinental ====
Year	Miss Intercontinental Thailand	Hometown	National Title	Competition performance		Ref.
Year	Miss Intercontinental Thailand	Hometown	National Title	Placement	Special award(s)	Ref.
2024	Arabella Sitanan Gregory	Phatthalung	Miss Thailand 2023 — 2nd Runner Up	Top 22		

==== Miss Face of Humanity ====
Year	Miss Face of Humanity Thailand	Hometown	National Title	Competition performance		Ref.
Year	Miss Face of Humanity Thailand	Hometown	National Title	Placement	Special award(s)	Ref.
2024	Kunpariya Khonthong	Nong Khai	Miss Thailand 2024 — Top 20	1st Runner Up		

=== Other international pageants ===
==== Miss Universe ====
Year	Delegate	Province	National Title	Competition performance		Ref.
Year	Delegate	Province	National Title	Placement	Special award(s)	Ref.
1954	Amara Asavananda	Phra Nakhon	Miss Thailand 1953 – 2nd Runner-Up	Unplaced		
1959	Sodsai Vanijvadhana	Phra Nakhon	Appointed	Unplaced	Miss Congeniality	
1965	Apasra Hongsakula	Phra Nakhon	Miss Thailand 1964	Miss Universe 1965		
1966	Cheranand Savetanand	Surat Thani	Miss Thailand 1965	2nd Runner Up		
1968	Apantree Prayutsenee	Phra Nakhon	Miss Thailand 1967	Top 15		
1969	Sangduen Manwong	Phra Nakhon	Miss Thailand 1968	Unplaced	Best National Costume	
1971	Warunee Sangsirinavin	Phra Nakhon	Miss Thailand 1969	Unplaced		
1972	Nipapat Sudsiri	Kanchanaburi	Miss Thailand 1971	Unplaced		
1973	Kanok-orn Bunma	Chachoengsao	Miss Thailand 1972	Unplaced		
1974	Benjamas Ponpasvijan	Pathum Thani	Appointed	Unplaced		
1984	Savinee Pakaranang	Bangkok	Miss Thailand 1984	Top 10		
1985	Tarntip Pongsuk	Nan	Miss Thailand 1985	Unplaced		
1986	Taweeporn Klungploy	Nakhon Sawan	Miss Thailand 1986	Unplaced		
1987	Chutima Naiyana	Bangkok	Miss Thailand 1987	Unplaced		
1988	Porntip Nakhirunkanok	Bangkok	Miss Thailand 1988	Miss Universe 1988	Best National Costume	
1989	Yonlada Ronghanam	Bangkok	Miss Thailand 1989	Unplaced	Best National Costume – 2nd Runner Up	
1990	Passaraporn Chaimongkol	Songkhla	Miss Thailand 1990	Unplaced	Miss Photogenic	
1991	Jiraprapa Sawettanan	Bangkok	Miss Thailand 1991	Unplaced		
1992	Orn-anong Panyawong	Chiang Mai	Miss Thailand 1992	Unplaced	Best National Costume – 1st Runner Up	
1993	Chattarika Ubonsiri	Bangkok	Miss Thailand 1993	Unplaced		
1994	Areeya Chumsai	Bangkok	Miss Thailand 1994	Unplaced	Miss Kodak Smile	
1995	Pavadee Winheinrat	Bangkok	Miss Thailand 1995	Unplaced		
1996	Nirachala Kumya	Chiang Mai	Miss Thailand 1995 – Top 10	Unplaced		
1997	Sueangsuda Lawanprasert	Nakhon Nayok	Miss Thailand 1997	Unplaced		
1998	Chalida Taochalee	Bangkok	Miss Thailand 1998	Unplaced		
1999	Apisamai Srirangsan	Nakhon Pathom	Miss Thailand 1999	Unplaced		

==== Miss World ====
Year	Delegate	Province	National Title	Competition performance		Ref.
Year	Delegate	Province	National Title	Placement	Special award(s)	Ref.
1968	Pinnarut Tananchai	Bangkok	Miss Thailand 1967 — 4th Runner Up	Top 15		

==== Miss International ====
Year	Delegate	Province	National Title	Competition performance		Ref.
Year	Delegate	Province	National Title	Placement	Special award(s)	Ref.
1968	Rungthip Pinyo	Lamphun	Miss Thailand 1967 — 1st Runner Up	4th Runner Up	Miss Photogenic	
1969	Usanee Phenphimol	Nakhon Si Thammarat	Appointed	4th Runner Up		
1970	Panarat Pisutthisak	Bangkok	Miss Thailand 1969 — 1st Runner Up	Top 15		
1971	Supuk Likitkul	Bangkok	Miss Bangkok 1971 — Contestant	1st Runner Up		
1972	Sarinya Thattavorn	Bangkok	Miss Thailand 1971 — 1st Runner Up	Unplaced		
1973	Jintana Te-chamaneewat	Bangkok	Miss Thailand 1972 — Contestant	Top 15		
1985	Sasimaporn Chaikomol†	Chanthaburi	Miss Thailand 1985 — 2nd Runner Up	Unplaced		
1986	Janthanee Singsuwan	Bangkok	Miss Thailand 1986 — Miss Photogenic	Unplaced		
1987	Prapaphan Bamrungthai	Phitsanulok	Miss Thailand 1987 — 4th Runner Up	Unplaced		
1988	Passorn Boonyakiat	Bangkok	Miss Thailand 1988 — Miss Photogenic	Unplaced	Miss Photogenic	
1989	Mayuree Chaiyo	Nan	Miss Thailand 1988 — 2nd Runner Up	Unplaced		
1992	Pornnapha Theptinnakorn	Bangkok	Miss Thailand 1992 — Top 10	Unplaced		
2001	Kanithakan Saengprachaksakula	Bangkok	Miss Thailand 2001 — Top 10	Unplaced		
2019	Sireethorn Leearamwat	Bangkok	Miss Thailand 2019	Miss International 2019	Miss International Asia	

==== Miss Global ====
Year	Delegate	Province	National Title	Competition performance		Ref.
Year	Delegate	Province	National Title	Placement	Special award(s)	Ref.
2023	Chonnikarn Supittayaporn	Chiang Mai	Miss Thailand 2023	2nd Runner Up		

==== Miss Charm ====
Year	Delegate	Province	National Title	Competition performance		Ref.
Year	Delegate	Province	National Title	Placement	Special award(s)	Ref.
2023	Patitta Suntivijj	Pathum Thani	Miss Thailand 2020 - 4th Runner Up	Top 20	Best Social Media	
2024	Pornsirikul Puata	Prachuap Khiri Khan	Miss Thailand 2024 - 1st Runner Up	Top 20		

==== Miss Queen of the Pacific ====
Year	Delegate	Province	National Title	Competition performance		Ref.
Year	Delegate	Province	National Title	Placement	Special award(s)	Ref.
1967	Prapussorn Panichkul	Bangkok	Miss Thailand 1966	Unplaced	Miss Congeniality	

== See also ==
- Miss World Thailand
- Miss Universe Thailand
- Miss Thailand International
