= Kanyaka, South Australia (disambiguation) =

Kanyaka, South Australia is a town and locality.

Kanyaka, South Australia may also refer to the following places in South Australia:

- District Council of Kanyaka, a former local government area
- Kanyaka Station, a pastoral property
- Hundred of Kanyaka, a cadastral unit

== See also ==
- Kanyaka (disambiguation)
- District Council of Kanyaka-Quorn
