= Khanian =

Khanian or Khaneyan or Khaniyan (خانيان) may refer to:

- Khanian, East Azerbaijan, a village in Iran
- Khanian, Mazandaran, a village in Iran
- Khanian, Mansehra, a village in Pakistan
- Khanian, Sude, Iranian-born Canadian painter and writer

== See also ==
- Kanian (disambiguation)
