= Wani Laohakiat =

Winner of Miss Thailand (1935)

- วณี เลาหเกียรติ
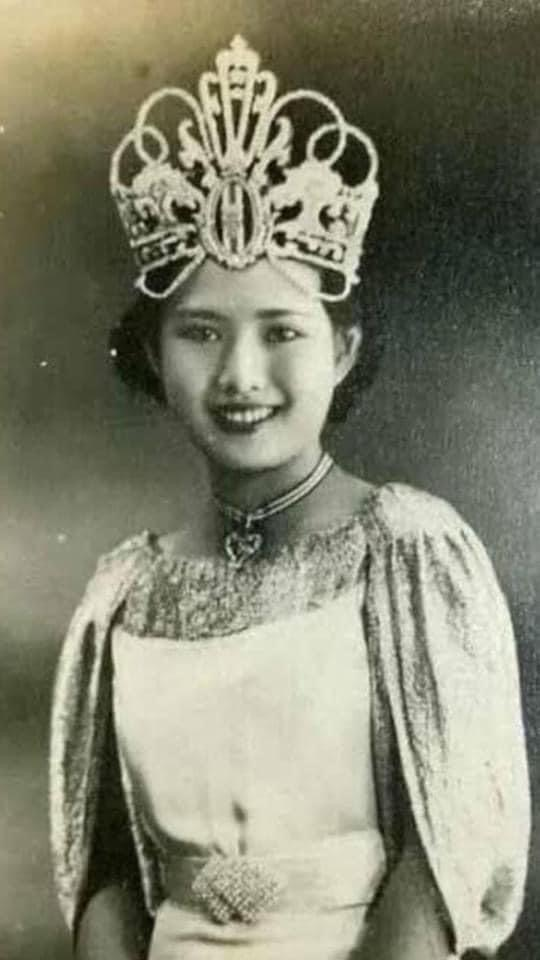
- Born: Evelyn Laohakiat; April 3, 1921; Thailand
- Died: September 24, 2023 (aged 102); Sam Phran District, Nakhon Pathom Province, Thailand
- Spouse: Manit Somprasong (m. 1941)
- Children: 3
- Relatives: Low Kiok Chiang

Wani Somprasong (Thai: วณี สมประสงค์; née Laohakiat; 3 April 1921 – 24 September 2023) was the winner of Miss Thailand 1935 and was the second winner of the Miss Thailand competition history.

== Early life ==
Wani Laohakiat, which old name was Evelyn Laohakiat, was born on April 3, 1921, to Mr.Boonjin Laohakiat and his wife, Lamom Chanthawekin. Her father's ancestor were Peranakan Chinese from Singapore.

Laohakiat finished kindergarten at St. Mary Kularbwittaya and studied in various school such as Assumption College, Saint Joseph Convent School, St.Francis Xavier Convent College due to her father changing workplaces.

== Career ==
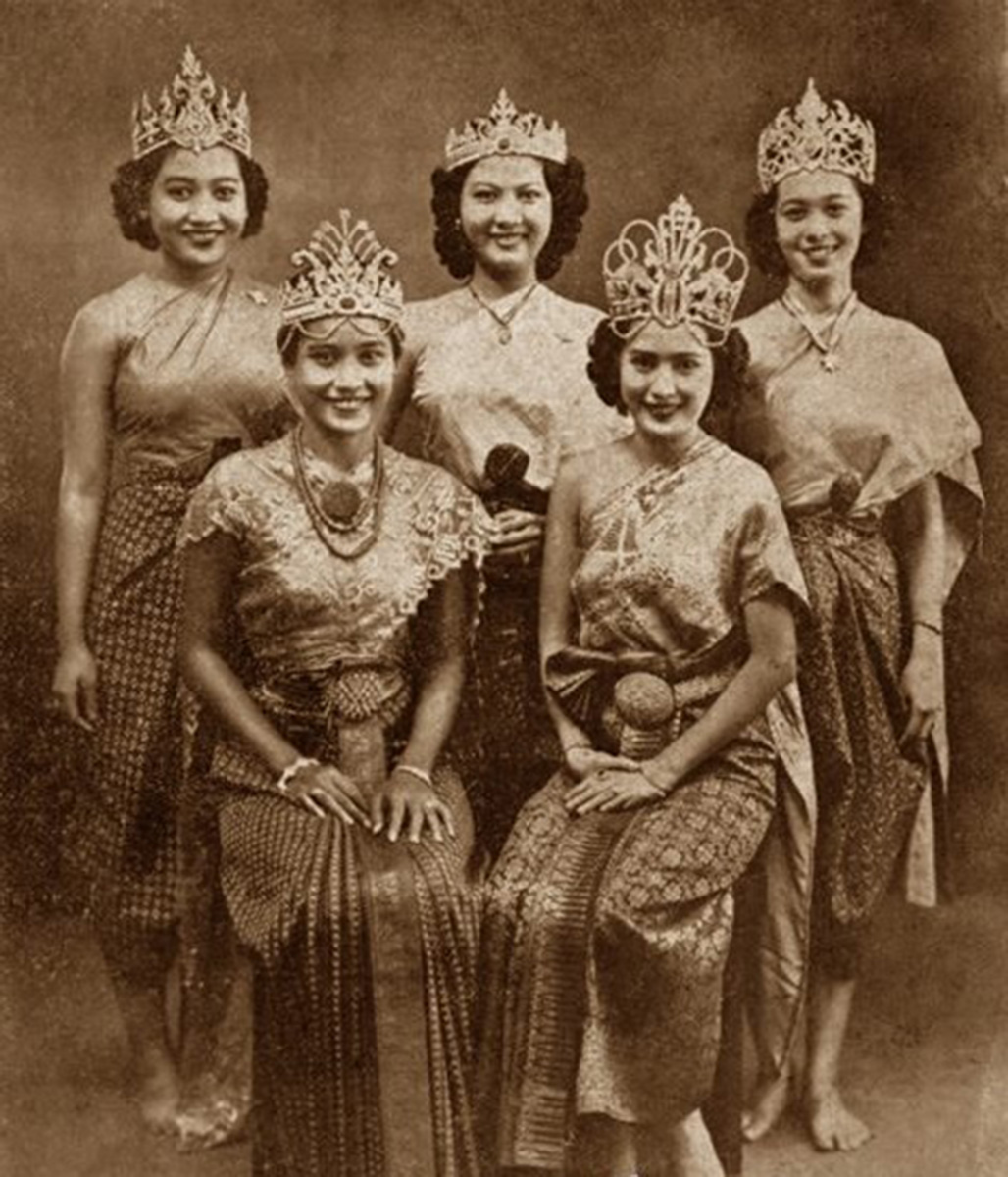
Picture of Laohakiat with four other contestants, Laohakiat is the right person that is sitting

In 1935, Laohakiat was invited to compete in Miss Thailand 1935 by the officer of Bang Rak, she won and was crowned by Mom Kobkaew Abhakara Na Ayudhya. she later said that she got tricked into competing in the competition because her neighbour, a lady from next door, said that her daughter would also compete so she could walk with Laohakiat on the runway, but she never came. She also said that the prize money for the competition was 1,000 baht, which the government asked her to donate to them afterwards.

== Death ==
Laohakiat passed away on September 24, 2023, at Sam Phran District, Nakhon Pathom Province, Thailand. at the age of 102.

== Personal life ==
Laohakiat married to Dr.Manit Somprasong, a doctor from Siriraj Hospital in 1941 and had three children.
