= Apisamai Srirangsan =

Miss Thailand 1999

- Born: Apisamai Srirangsan; December 15, 1974 (age 51); Nakhon Pathom, Thailand
- Education: Khon Kaen University
- Spouse: Andrew Melka (m. 2012)
- Beauty pageant titleholder
- Title: Miss Thailand 1999
- Hair color: Black
- Eye color: Black
- Major competitions: Miss Thailand 1999 (winner); Miss Universe 1999 (Unplaced)

Apisamai Srirangsan (Thai: อภิสมัย ศรีรังสรรค์; RTGS: Aphisamai Sirangsan), nicknamed Birth (Thai: เบิร์ท) (born December 15, 1974) is a Thai psychiatrist and beauty pageant titleholder who was crowned Miss Thailand 1999. She attended the medical school of Khon Kaen University. She competed in the Miss Universe 1999 pageant competition held in Trinidad and Tobago as the last Miss Thailand titleholder to compete.

Currently, she works as the Director of Bangkok Hospital Rehabilitation and Recovery Center Bangkok Thailand

== Filmography ==
=== News presenter ===
- News presenter Channel 7 (2001-2008)
- Evening News (Part 2) Channel 7
- News Channel 7
- Evening News NBT
- News presenter NBT (2011-2014)
- News presenter One 31 (2014-2015)

=== Personalities ===
| Year | Thai title | Title | Network | Notes | With |
|---|---|---|---|---|---|
| 2005-2008 | เพราะฉันคือผู้หญิง | | iTV And TITV | | |

== Work ==
On January 14, 2021, during the COVID-19 pandemic in Thailand she was appointed assistant spokesperson for COVID-19 Situation Administration (CCSA) by the CCSA board, led by Prayut Chan-o-cha.

| Preceded by Chalida Taochalee | Miss Thailand; Miss Thailand 1999 | Succeeded by Panadda Wongpuudee |
