= Miss Thailand 2023 =

54th Miss Thailand competition, beauty pageant edition

- Date: 19 March 2023
- Venue: Chaeng Watthana Hall, Central Chaeng Watthana, Nonthaburi
- Broadcaster: YouTube
- Entrants: 47
- Placements: 20
- Winner: Chonnikarn Supittayaporn; Chiang Mai
- Photogenic: Chonnikarn Supittayaporn; Chiang Mai

Miss Thailand 2023 (Thai: นางสาวไทย 2566) was the 54th edition of Miss Thailand beauty pageant organized by TPN Global Co., Ltd. under cooperation with Tero Entertainment. The pageant scheduled to be held at Chaeng Watthana Hall, Central Chaeng Watthana, Nonthaburi on 19 March 2023, while the initial pageant activities was decided to be done in the province of Phatthalung. This year, representatives from 47 provinces have been selected Manita Farmer of Phuket crowned her successor Chonnikarn Supittayaporn of Chiang Mai at the end of the event. Chonnikarn will represent Thailand at Miss Global 2023 in Vietnam.

== Results ==
=== Placements ===
Color keys

- The contestant won in an International pageant.
- The contestant was a Finalist/Runner-up in an International pageant.
- The contestant was a Semi-Finalist in an International pageant.
- The contestant did not place.

| Placement | Contestant | International placement |
|---|---|---|
| Miss Thailand 2023 | Chiang Mai – Chonnikarn Supittayaporn | 2nd Runner-Up – Miss Global 2023 |
| 1st Runner-Up | Sakon Nakhon – Marisa Phonthirat | |
| 2nd Runner-Up | Phatthalung – Arabella Sitanan Gregory | Top 22 – Miss Intercontinental 2024 |
| 3rd Runner-Up | Phra Nakhon Si Ayutthaya – Kanokporn Payungwong | |
| 4th Runner-Up | Amnat Charoen – Supansa Wattananusit | |
| Top 11 | Bangkok – Nadaphan Gamngern; Chonburi – Athitiya Benjapak; Kamphaeng Phet – Suratchawadee Chakkit §; Nakhon Ratchasima – Surarak Kiatsungnoen; Ubon Ratchathani – Areeya Sansuriwong; Uthai Thani – Kanyawee Nukaew | |
| Top 20 | Ang Thong – Sirinapha Moonpla; Krabi – Switta Khamfoi; Lopburi – Nichaphat Rodsaveek; Pathum Thani – Thannaphat Mongkol; Phuket – Passanan Tadam; Roi Et – Woranuch Chansuwan; Samut Prakan – Wasunan Sawekwihari; Songkhla – Phawita Thammachoti; Trang – Rungthiwa Benjathikun | |

§ – Placed into the Top 11 by Fast Track

== Special awards ==
| Results | Contestants |
|---|---|
| Miss Lovely Sweetie | Uthai Thani – Kanyawee Nukaew |
| Miss Healthy Beauty By Siaminnohealth.co., ltd | Chiang Mai – Chonnikarn Supittayaporn |
| Miss Hospitality by Centara | Kamphaeng Phet – Suratchawadee Chakkit |
| Miss Thai Beauty by Aotura | Amnat Charoen – Supansa Wattananusit |
| Miss Beautiful Skin | Khon Kaen – Nawaporn Arukan |
| Miss Beauty Face | Lampang – Suwimon Phuanglam |
| Best of Stage Performance | Krabi – Switta Khamfoi |
| Miss Confidentiality | Prachuap Khiri Khan – Phachara Krisanaseranee |
| Smart Lady | Lopburi – Nichaphat Rodsaveek |
| Best of Spirit | Phang Nga – Warisara Angkitanont |
| Best Publication of Thai Fabrics | Ubon Ratchathani – Areeya Sansuriwong |
| Face of Elegance | Buriram – Nattharika Nuengwongsa |
| Best Charisma | Amnat Charoen – Supansa Wattananusit |
| Best Charming | Phuket – Passanan Tadam |
| Best of Thai Rama6 Costume | Sukhothai – Pimphatra Phak Bua |
| Best of Thai Night Dress | Sakon Nakhon – Marisa Phonthirat |
| Best of Debutante Dress | Ubon Ratchathani – Areeya Sansuriwong |
| Best of Landmark | Ang Thong – Sirinapha Moonpla; Amnat Charoen – Supansa Wattananusit; Sakon Nakhon – Marisa Phonthirat; Ubon Ratchathani – Areeya Sansuriwong; Nakhon Pathom – Sasi Suriyachantrathong; Chiang Mai – Chonnikarn Supittayaporn |
| Best of The Ultimate Precious | Ubon Ratchathani – Areeya Sansuriwong |
| Photographer and Media Favorite | Chiang Mai – Chonnikarn Supittayaporn |
| Vincent Clinic Fast Track | Kamphaeng Phet – Suratchawadee Chakkit |

== Candidates ==
47 contestants competed for the title.

| Code | Province | Name | Placement |
|---|---|---|---|
| MT01 | Bangkok | Nadaphan Gamngern | Top 11 |
| MT02 | Krabi | Switta Khamfoi | Top 20 |
| MT03 | Kanchanaburi | Dusita Intharak | |
| MT04 | Kamphaeng Phet | Suratchawadee Chakkit | Top 11 |
| MT05 | Khon Kaen | Nawaporn Arukan | |
| MT06 | Chachoengsao | Thanittha Uthit | |
| MT07 | Chonburi | Athitiya Benjapak | Top 11 |
| MT08 | Chiang Rai | Sirintip Phongen | |
| MT09 | Chiang Mai | Chonnikarn Supittayaporn | Miss Thailand 2023 |
| MT10 | Trang | Rungthiwa Benjathikun | Top 20 |
| MT11 | Nakhon Nayok | Empecha Sujarit | |
| MT12 | Nakhon Pathom | Sasi Suriyachantrathong | |
| MT13 | Nakhon Ratchasima | Surarak Kiatsungnoen | Top 11 |
| MT14 | Nakhon Si Thammarat | Unchittha Suksong | |
| MT15 | Nakhon Sawan | Kanokphit Sawantranon | |
| MT16 | Nonthaburi | Thanaporn Supakosol | |
| MT17 | Bueng Kan | Achiraya Tomyangkun | |
| MT18 | Buriram | Nattharika Nuengwongsa | |
| MT19 | Pathum Thani | Thannaphat Mongkol | Top 20 |
| MT20 | Prachuap Khiri Khan | Phachara Krisanaseranee | |
| MT21 | Phra Nakhon Si Ayutthaya | Kanokporn Payungwong | 3rd Runner-Up |
| MT22 | Phang Nga | Warisara Angkitanont | |
| MT23 | Phatthalung | Arabella Sitanan Gregory | 2nd Runner-Up |
| MT24 | Phitsanulok | Zhanita Aueboonmisiri | |
| MT26 | Phuket | Passanan Tadam | Top 20 |
| MT27 | Yala | Sathanaporn Sukunwisan | |
| MT28 | Roi Et | Woranuch Chansuwan | Top 20 |
| MT29 | Ranong | Natchayakarn Pakwan | |
| MT30 | Rayong | Mantima Supapichai | |
| MT31 | Ratchaburi | Sirinthip Tiapao | |
| MT32 | Lopburi | Nichaphat Rodsaveek | Top 20 |
| MT33 | Lampang | Chayanisa Aoiwan | |
| MT34 | Lamphun | Ploychompoo Turapat | |
| MT35 | Sakon Nakhon | Marisa Phonthirat | 1st Runner-up |
| MT36 | Songkhla | Phawita Thammachoti | Top 20 |
| MT37 | Samut Prakan | Wasunan Sawekwihari | Top 20 |
| MT38 | Samut Songkhram | Chananchida Jittrong | |
| MT39 | Sukhothai | Pimphatra Phak Bua | |
| MT40 | Suphanburi | Nannaphat Kluang | |
| MT41 | Surat Thani | Natthawan Khongphet | |
| MT42 | Nong Khai | Nattrada Phaphiranon | |
| MT43 | Nong Bua Lamphu | Ranida Thanik Korkarnkul | |
| MT44 | Ang Thong | Sirinapha Moonpla | Top 20 |
| MT45 | Uthai Thani | Kanyawee Nukaew | Top 11 |
| MT46 | Ubon Ratchathani | Areeya Sansuriwong | Top 11 |
| MT47 | Amnat Charoen | Supansa Wattananusit | 4th Runner-Up |

== See also ==
- Miss World 2023
