= Emilia Kánya =

Hungarian author

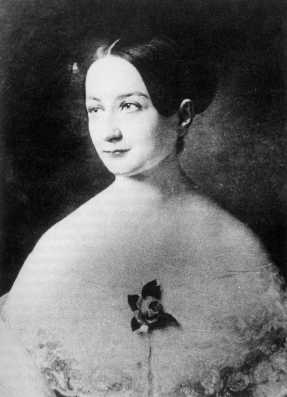
- Emilia Kánya, c. 1861
- Born: 10 November 1830; Buda, Kingdom of Hungary
- Died: 10 November 1905 (aged 75); Fiume (now Rijeka), Croatia, Kingdom of Hungary
- Occupations: Author, editor, publisher, and translator
- Writing career
- Pen name: 'Emilia'
- Subjects: Women's rights and education
- Notable work: Family Circle (Hungarian: Családi Kör)

Emilia Kánya (10 November 1830 – 10 November 1905) was a Hungarian author who was considered, at the time of her death, to be "the first Hungarian feminist". She published, edited and wrote for her weekly journal, Family Circle (Hungarian: Családi Kör), the first magazine for women in Hungary.

== Life ==
Emilia Kánya was born on 10 November 1830 in Buda, capital of the Kingdom of Hungary. She married Gottfried Feldinger in 1847 and they moved to Temesvár (today Timișoara, Romania) where they published a German-language journal called Euphrosine. The marriage ended in divorce after a decade and she married the journalist Mór Szegfi in 1860. Her husband got a job with the Ministry of Trade after 1867, but lost it in 1876. He was forced to take a job in Lőcse (now Lovoča, Slovakia), but Kánya remained with her children in Budapest. Between her two marriages, she had eight children. Financial difficulties plagued her for the rest of her life, and she was forced to move in with one or another of her daughters, moving with one to a province in northern Hungary in 1881 and then to Fiume (now Rijeka, Croatia) in December 1884 where she remained until her death on 10 November 1904.

== Activities ==
Kánya helped to edit Euphrosine with her first husband and the contacts that she made then proved to be useful after her divorce and she began writing and translating, using the pen-name 'Emilia'. She became the first woman to publish a journal in Hungary when she received permission from the authorities in October 1860 to start the weekly Family Circle. In addition to editing the magazine with the help of her husband, she also contributed many articles, in addition to those submitted by other authors. The magazine was a mix of short fiction, biographies, news and more mundane things like household and cooking tips. It became the official journal of the Charity Association of Women in Pest (Hungarian: Pesti Jótékony Nőegyesület) in 1864, but Kánya was forced to sell it in 1880 as she was losing subscribers. She then became the secretary of the National Women's Trade Association (Hungarian: Országos Nőipar Egyesület).
