= Kanya Thiensawang =

First Miss Thailand (1934)

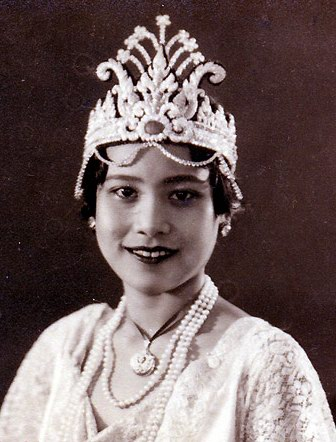
- Born: August 30, 1914; Nonthaburi, Siam
- Died: November 16, 1960 (aged 46); Bangkok, Thailand
- Spouse: Suchit Hiranyaphruek (m. 1943; died 1960)
- Children: 5

Kanya Thiensawang (Thai: กันยา เทียนสว่าง; RTGS: Kanya Thiansawang; born 8 August 1914 in Nonthaburi, Thailand), nicknamed Lucille (Thai: ลูซิล) was the first winner of the Miss Siam pageant (now known as Miss Thailand), in 1934. Her mother was of Mon descent and she died when Kanya was 10 years old.
