= Bui Simon =

Thai philanthropist and beauty queen (born 1969)

Porntip Bui Simon
- Born: Porntip Nakhirunkanok; February 7, 1969 (age 57); Bangkok, Thailand
- Height: 5 ft 8 in (1.73 m)
- Spouse: Herbert Simon (m. 2002)
- Children: 3
- Beauty pageant titleholder
- Hair color: Black
- Eye color: Brown
- Major competitions: Miss Thailand 1988 (Winner); Miss Universe 1988 (winner)

Bui Simon (born Porntip Nakhirunkanok (Thai: ภรณ์ทิพย์ นาคหิรัญกนก; RTGS: Phonthip Nakhirankanok; pronounced [pʰɔ̄ːn.tʰíp nâːk.hì.rān.kā.nòk]); February 7, 1969) is a Thai philanthropist and beauty queen who won Miss Universe 1988. Simon is president and founder of the Angels Wings Foundation. She is on the Board of Regents of Pepperdine University, the Board of the Children's Museum of Indianapolis as a Distinguished Advisor and also is on the Board of Governors for the Dream Foundation.

== Biography ==
Porntip Nakhirunkanok was born in Bangkok, Thailand. Her nickname is "Bui" (Thai: ปุ๋ย, RTGS: Pui, pronounced [pǔj]), which is her preferred name. It means "to sleep like a baby" in Thai. In the early 70's, she was brought to the United States by her family.

In August 1988, Nakhirunkanok was presented the Thai Royal Medal of Honour, Most Exalted Order of the White Elephant, by King Bhumibol Adulyadej for her service in helping children in need. She received a second Royal Decoration in 2001, Companion of the Most Noble Order of the Crown of Thailand.

In 1989, she was named United Nations Goodwill Ambassador of Thailand by Air Chief Marshal Siddhi Savetsila, Minister of Foreign Affairs of Thailand. As Goodwill Ambassador, she addressed the UN General Assembly concerning the Convention on the Rights of the Child.

In 2002, she married Herbert Simon, an American businessman who is the owner of the Indiana Pacers basketball team and Simon Property Group. The home she and her family had lived in, and all belongings, were destroyed in the January 2025 Southern California wildfires.

In 2013, through her Angels Wings Foundation International, she provided foundational support to help launch Teach For Thailand, an organization focused on recruiting and training professionals to teach in disadvantaged public schools.

== Pageantry ==
In 1983, at the age of 15, Simon took part in the Miss California Teen USA where she was placed first runner-up. Upon her return to Thailand, she participated in the 1988 Miss Thailand pageant held in Bangkok where she won the right to represent Thailand at the Miss Universe pageant.

Aged 19, Simon was crowned as Miss Universe 1988 by outgoing titleholder Cecilia Bolocco on May 24, 1988, in Taipei, Taiwan. She became the second Thai woman to win the title after Apasra Hongsakula who won Miss Universe 1965. Simon became the first woman ever to win both the Miss Universe and Best National Costume award in one pageant. At the time of Miss Universe 1988, Simon weighed 114 pounds (52 kg), and stood at 5 ft 8 in (1.73 m). Simon crowned her successor, Angela Visser of the Netherlands, at Miss Universe 1989 in Cancún, Mexico.

Awards and achievements
Preceded by (Chile) Cecilia Bolocco	Miss Universe; 1988	Succeeded by (Netherlands) Angela Visser
Preceded by Chutima Naiyana	Miss Thailand; 1988	Succeeded by Yonlada Ronghanam
