= Paweena Hongsakul =

Thai politician

Paweena Hongsakul (born 5 July 1949) is Thailand politician, and a women's and children's rights activist. In 1988 she became the Deputy Minister of Labor and Social Welfare of Thailand, then Minster for the Prime Minister's Office between 1999 and 2000, and later between 2013 and 2014, she became the Minister of Social Development and Human Security.

== Early life and education ==
Hongsakul was born to parent Gp. Capt Perm and Mrs. Keyoon Hongsakul. She is a devoted Buddhist follower. She completed her high school education at Kenyon Rae Methodist Girls School, Malaysia. She then moved to earn a bachelor's degree in commerce at Bliss College, Ohio, United States. Hongsakul completed her MA in political science at Ramkhamhaeng University. She then later enrolled for Ph.D. program in economics, specializing in political economics at Chulalongkorn University.

== Politics ==
Hongsakul served as a congresswoman for 18 years. She became the first Woman Leader of the House from 1992 to 1993. She held chairperson of many committees such as Youth Activities, Science and Technology, and Tourism. She later became the Minister of Labor and Social Welfare in 1988, and Minster for the Prime Minister's Office from 1999 to 2000. Hongsakul became a Consultant for the Ministry of Labor, Ministry of Justice and the Deputy Prime Minister.
