= Kanya Viljoen =

South African director and actress

- Born: Kanya Viljoen; 29 September 1994 (age 31); South Africa
- Education: University of Cape Town
- Occupations: Actress, playwright, director, writer
- Years active: 2015–present
- Height: 151 cm (4 ft 11 in)

Kanya Viljoen (born 29 September 1994) is a South African actress, playwright, director and writer. She is best known for the roles in the television serials Afgrond and Die Sentrum. She is also a director who directed the plays RAAK and Like Hamlet.

== Personal life ==
Viljoen was born on 29 September 1994 in South Africa. In 2017, she graduated with a B.A. (Hons) Degree in Theatre and Performance from the University of Cape Town (UCT). She later completed her MA in theatre-making from the same university.

== Career ==
During her life at UCT, she appeared in many student plays such as; Lied van die Boeings (2015), I Want to Live in Woolworths (2016), Lied van die Boeings, As You Like It, Murdering Agatha Christie (2016). For her final Masters project in 2017, she performed in the All of It, Everything, Now, Together directed by Francesco Nassimbeni. During the same period, she also started her music career, where she joined with the band "Huey Huey". She is also a founding member of the jazz band "Vivace Music".

In 2017, she wrote and directed the play RAAK, which debuted at the Free State Arts Festival. The play was later nominated as Best Production of the festival. Meanwhile, she won the South African Theatre Magazine's Best Emerging Director Award. Then in 2018, she directed the play Like Hamlet performed at the Theatre Arts Admin Collective. Then she wrote the script, Mank, where Kanya was awarded a writer's bursary for this script.

In 2021, she starred in the kykNET drama series Afgrond and played the role "Leora van Niekerk". In the meantime, she joined with the SABC2 telenovela Die Sentrum and played the role "Sanette". She also directed the short film The Moment of Dying. In 2021, she wrote and directed the romantic short, Ekstasis and the film Om teen treine te skre.

== Filmography ==
Year	Film	Role	Genre	Ref.
2021	Afgrond	Leora van Niekerk	TV series	
2021	Die Sentrum	Sanette	TV series	
2021	The Moment of Dying	Director	TV series	
2021	Ekstasis	Director, writer	TV series	
