= Amanda Olivares =

Mexican beauty pageant titleholder (born 1966)

- Born: Amanda Beatriz Olivares Phillip; 3 March 1966 (age 60); Puebla de Zaragoza, Puebla, Mexico
- Height: 1.73 m (5 ft 8 in)
- Beauty pageant titleholder
- Hair color: Black
- Eye color: Brown
- Major competitions: Señorita Puebla 1987 (Winner); Señorita México 1987 (Winner); Miss Universe 1988 (2nd Runner-up)

Amanda Beatriz Olivares Phillip (born March 3, 1966, in Puebla, Mexico) is a Mexican beauty pageant titleholder who represented her country in the 1988 Miss Universe pageant, held in Taipei, Taiwan on May 23, 1988, and obtained the second runner-up. Amanda married and always wanted to be a Home maker, Mother and Wife.

During Miss Universe, Amanda Olivares was also the only contestant from the Americas, as well as the only non-Asian to make it into the top five that year. She is the best friend of Mercedes Rodriguez Silva, Gabriela Silva, Laura Ortega and Zandra Rodríguez. Amanda has 3 daughters; Amanda, Joyce and Tania Tame Olivares. She is happily married to Esteban Pedroche Gomez and is still living in her Home Town Puebla in Mexico.

Awards and achievements
Preceded by (United States) Michelle Royer	Miss Universe 2nd Runner-Up; 1988	Succeeded by (United States) Gretchen Polhemus
Preceded by Cynthia Fallon	Señorita México; 1987	Succeeded by Adriana Abascal
