= Margareta Arvidsson =

Swedish beauty pageant contestant (born 1947)

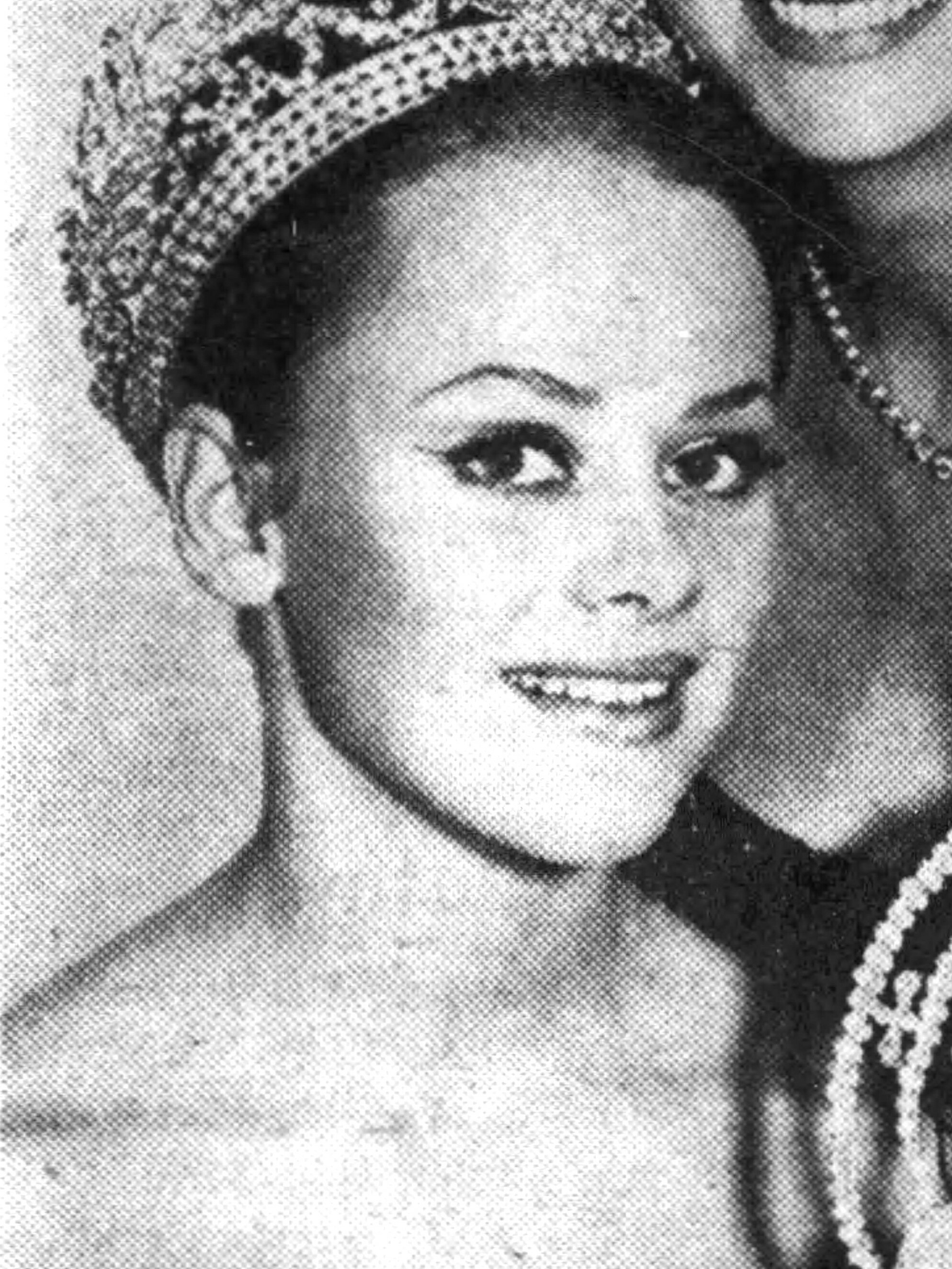
- Arvidsson as Miss Universe in 1967
- Born: Margareta Arvidsson; 12 October 1947 (age 78); Gothenburg, Sweden
- Spouse: Otto Stupakoff (divorced after 9 years)
- Beauty pageant titleholder
- Title: Miss Sweden; Miss Universe
- Hair color: Blonde
- Eye color: Blue
- Major competitions: Miss Sweden 1966 (Winner); Miss Universe 1966 (Winner)

Margareta Arvidsson (born 12 October 1947) is a Swedish actress, fashion model and beauty queen who was crowned as the 1966 Miss Universe at age 18. She represented Vänersborg in the 1966 Miss Sweden Pageant. She was the second Swedish woman to win the crown, 11 years after Hillevi Rombin.

Arvidsson won the Miss Photogenic title at the 15th Annual Miss Universe Pageant which was held in Miami Beach, Florida, culminating with her crowning on 16 July 1966. After her crowning, she walked to greet the audience, was interviewed by the pageant host, and posed for pictures with the runners-up, sitting on the throne.

In March 1999, Margareta Arvidsson was a guest of honor at the 50th Anniversary of the Miss Sweden Pageant.

== Post-Miss Universe career ==
After her crowning as Miss Universe, Arvidsson worked as a model for the Ford Modeling Agency and appeared on stage and in film.

== Personal life ==
Arvidsson was married to Brazilian fashion photographer Otto Stupakoff for nine years and had two children with him. Her granddaughter and fellow model Kianna Stupakoff wrote that Arvidsson was spurned for her weight as a model in the 1970s and had told her that Ford Models executive “Eileen Ford called me fat as an elephant”.

In the 1970s, Arvidsson was diagnosed with Addison's disease.

Arvidsson moved to and settled in Fairfield, Iowa prior to 2019.

== Political activities ==
In May 2019, amid the 2020 United States presidential election, Arvidsson, who had become an Iowa resident, praised Democratic candidate and Project Angel Food founder Marianne Williamson as someone who could bring “consciousness” to the national debate, and similarly praised U.S. Senator Bernie Sanders after his campaign visit in Fairfield. In August 2019, Arvidsson endorsed and volunteered for Williamson, helping drive Williamson's campaign RV around the Hawkeye State. She also endorsed Williamson in her 2024 presidential bid.

Awards and achievements
Preceded by (Thailand) Apasra Hongsakula	Miss Universe; 1966	Succeeded by (United States) Sylvia Hitchcock
