= Cheranand Savetanand =

Thai doctor and beauty queen (born 1941)

- Born: Cheranand Savetanand; October 25, 1941 (age 84); Surat Thani, Thailand
- Height: 5 ft 6 in (1.68 m)
- Beauty pageant titleholder
- Title: Miss Thailand 1965
- Hair color: Black
- Eye color: Black
- Major competitions: Miss Thailand 1965 (Winner); Miss Universe 1966 (2nd runner-up); Miss UniWorld 1968 (Winner) (Miss Congeniality) (Miss Photogenic)

Cheranand Savetanand (born October 25, 1941) is a Thai doctor and beauty pageant titleholder who was Miss Thailand 1966 and second runner-up at Miss Universe 1966.

== Miss Thailand 1965 ==
Savetanand is the daughter of Police Major General "Jaroong" and Aramsri Savetanand. She was the 1965 winner of the Miss Thailand beauty contest held in Bangkok, Thailand. She graduated from United Kingdom. Like her predecessor, she received training from the Queen Sirikit before competing.

== Miss Universe 1966 ==
She was crowned Miss Thailand 1965 on December 3, 1965. She then went on to compete at the 1966 Miss Universe pageant held in Miami Beach, Florida where she placed second runner-up to Margareta Arvidsson of Sweden who was crowned Miss Universe 1966.

== Life after Miss Thailand ==
In 1969, she married Rungthum Ladplee, surgical doctor of Siriraj Hospital.
