= Miss Universe 1988 =

37th Miss Universe pageant

- Date: 24 May 1988 (Note: The event was held at 8:00 am Taiwan Time (UTC+08:00); for the Americas, this was May 23 in their local times.)
- Presenters: Alan Thicke; Tracy Scoggins
- Venue: Lin Kou Stadium, Taipei, Taiwan
- Broadcaster: CBS (international); CTS (official broadcaster)
- Entrants: 66
- Placements: 10
- Withdrawals: Barbados; Belize; Curaçao; Cyprus; Greece; India; Kenya; Panama; Senegal
- Returns: Belgium; Bermuda; Gibraltar; Iceland; Luxembourg; Republic of China; Scotland
- Winner: Porntip Nakhirunkanok; Thailand
- Congeniality: Liza Camacho (Guam)
- Best National Costume: Porntip Nakhirunkanok (Thailand)
- Photogenic: Tracey Williams (England)

Miss Universe 1988 was the 37th edition of Miss Universe pageant, was held at the Lin Kou Stadium in Taipei, Taiwan, on 24 May 1988.

Cecilia Bolocco of Chile crowned Porntip Nakhirunkanok of Thailand at the conclusion of the event.

Sixty-six candidates competed in this year's edition.

== Background ==
=== Selection of participants ===
Contestants representing sixty-six countries and territories were chosen to participate in the pageant. Three candidates were appointed to represent their country to replace the original dethroned winner.

==== Replacements ====
Miss France 1988, Sylvie Bertin, refused to compete in both Miss Universe and Miss World pageants. The pageant organizers decided to send her first runner-up, Claudia Frittolini to compete in both pageants instead.

The original winner of Miss Italia 1987, Mirca Viola, was dethroned few days later after it was discovered that she was married and had a child, and less than one month later, the final contest was repeated and Michela Rocco di Torrepadula won. But a few months later, she renounced her right to go to Miss Universe, instead competing in Miss Europe 1988, where she won the crown. Due to the scandal with both winners, the Miss Universe Organization took away the licence from the Miss Italia organizers and a new organization called Miss Universo Campione d'Italia was held as the Italian selection for Miss Universe pageant from 1988 to 1991. Simona Ventura, who competed at Miss Italia 1986 pageant, won the first edition on 30 March 1988.

Miss Luxembourg 1988, Chantal Schanbacher, was also set to compete in the pageant, but was replaced by her second runner-up Lydie Garnie due to her exams.

==== Debuts, returns, and withdrawals ====
This edition marked the return of the Republic of China, which last competed in 1964, Bermuda in 1985, and Belgium, Gibraltar, Iceland, Luxembourg and Scotland in 1986. Barbados, Belize, Curaçao, Cyprus, Greece, India, Kenya, Panama and Senegal withdrew from the competition.

== Results ==
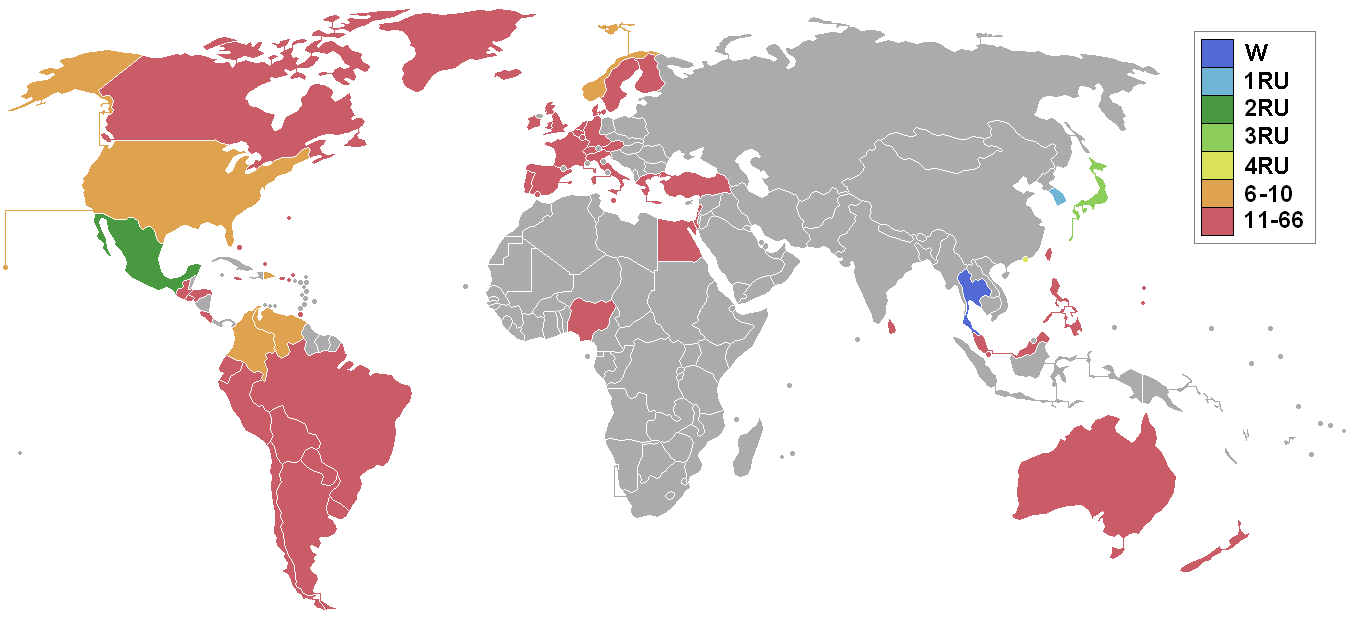
Countries and territories which sent delegates and results for Miss Universe 1988

=== Placements ===
Placement	Contestant
Miss Universe 1988	Thailand – Porntip Nakhirunkanok
1st Runner-Up	South Korea – Yoon-jeong Jang
2nd Runner-Up	Mexico – Amanda Olivares
3rd Runner-Up	Japan – Mizuho Sakaguchi
4th Runner-Up	Hong Kong – Pauline Yeung
Top 10	Colombia – Diana Arévalo; Dominican Republic – Patricia Jiménez; Norway – Bente Brunland; United States – Courtney Gibbs; Venezuela – Yajaira Vera

== Contestants ==
- Argentina – Claudia Pereyra
- Australia – Vanessa Gibson
- Austria – Maria Steinhart
- Bahamas – Natasha Pinder
- Belgium – Daisy van Cauwenbergh
- Bermuda – Kim Lightbourne
- Bolivia – Ana María Pereyra
- Brazil – Isabel Beduschi
- British Virgin Islands – Nelda Farrington
- Canada – Melinda Gillies
- Chile – Verónica Romero
- Colombia – Diana Arévalo
- Costa Rica – Erika Paoli
- Denmark – Pernille Nathansen
- Dominican Republic – Patricia Jiménez
- Ecuador – Cecilia Pozo
- Egypt – Amina Shelbaya
- El Salvador – Margarita Vaquerano
- England – Tracey Williams
- Finland – Nina Björnström
- France – Claudia Frittolini
- Gibraltar – Mayte Sanchez
- Greenland – Nuno Baadh
- Guam – Liza Camacho
- Guatemala – Silvia Mansilla
- Holland – Annabet Berendssen
- Honduras – Jacqueline Herrera
- Hong Kong – Pauline Yeung
- Iceland – Anna Margret Jónsdóttir
- Ireland – Adrienne Rock
- Israel – Shirly Ben Mordechai
- Italy – Simona Ventura
- Jamaica – Leota Suah
- Japan – Mizuho Sakaguchi
- Lebanon – Elaine Fakhoury
- Luxembourg – Lydie Garnie
- Malaysia – Linda Lum
- Malta – Stephanie Spiteri
- Mexico – Amanda Olivares
- New Zealand – Lana Coc-Kroft
- Nigeria – Omasan Buwa
- Northern Mariana Islands – Ruby Jean Hamilton
- Norway – Bente Brunland
- Paraguay – Marta Noemi Acosta
- Peru – Katia Escudero
- Philippines – Perfida Limpin
- Portugal – Isabel da Costa
- Puerto Rico – Isabel Pardo
- Republic of China – Jade Hu
- Scotland – Amanda Laird
- Singapore – Audrey Ann Tay
- South Korea (Note: Competed as Korea in the pageant) – Yoon-jeong Jang
- Spain – Sonsoles Artigas
- Sri Lanka – Deepthi Alles
- Sweden – Annika Davidsson
- Switzerland – Gabriela Bigler
- Thailand – Porntip Nakhirunkanok
- Trinidad and Tobago – Cheryl Gordon
- Turkey – Meltem Hakarar
- Turks and Caicos Islands – Edna Smith
- United States – Courtney Gibbs
- United States Virgin Islands – Heather Carty
- Uruguay – Carla Trombotti
- Venezuela – Yajaira Vera
- Wales – Lise Williams
- West Germany (Note: Competed as Germany in the pageant) – Christiane Kopp
