= List of protected heritage sites in Dilsen-Stokkem =

The list of onroerend heritage sites in Dilsen-Stokkem with an overview of the protected heritage sites in the Flemish town Dilsen-Stokkem contains over 500 objects.

These lists are part of Belgium's national heritage:

- List of protected heritage sites in Dilsen-Stokkem (part 1) (numbers 71120–71544)
- List of protected heritage sites in Dilsen-Stokkem (part 2) (numbers 71546–71624, and others up to number 200339)

== See also ==
- List of onroerend erfgoed in Limburg (Belgium)
- Dilsen-Stokkem
