= Miss Switzerland =

National beauty pageant competition in Switzerland

Miss Suisse Organisation Miss Schweiz Organisation
- (in French) Miss Suisse (in German) Miss Schweiz (in Italian) Miss Svizzera (in Romansh) Miss Svizra
- Formation: 1949; 77 years ago
- Type: Beauty pageant
- Headquarters: Bern
- Location: Switzerland
- Members: Miss Universe
- Official language: French; German
- National director: Bernard Poffet
- Website: www.missuniverseswitzerland.ch

The Miss Switzerland or Miss Universe Switzerland (French: Miss Suisse; German: Miss Schweiz; Italian: Miss Svizzera) is a national beauty pageant in Switzerland.

== History ==
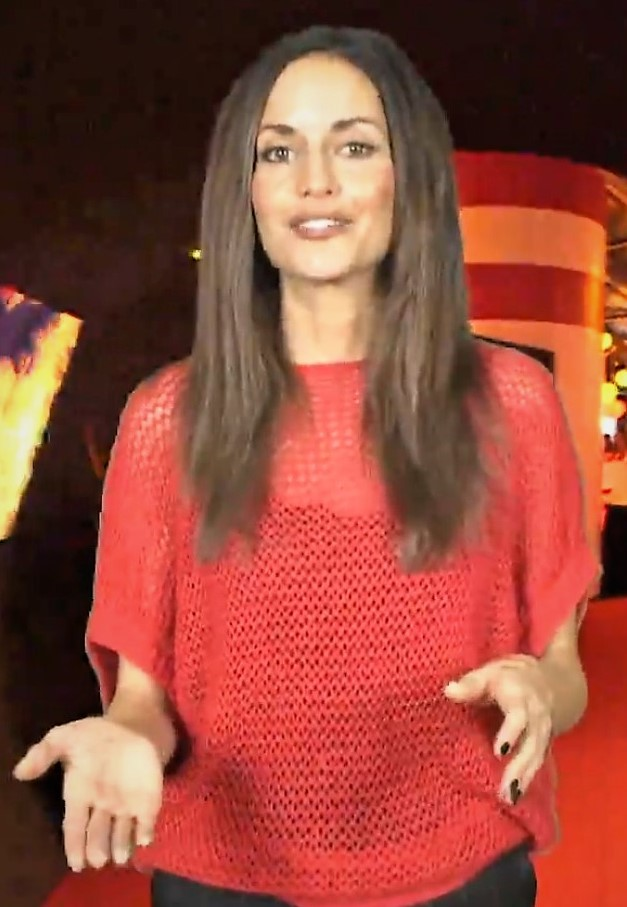
Nadine Vinzens, Miss Switzerland 2003, in 2017

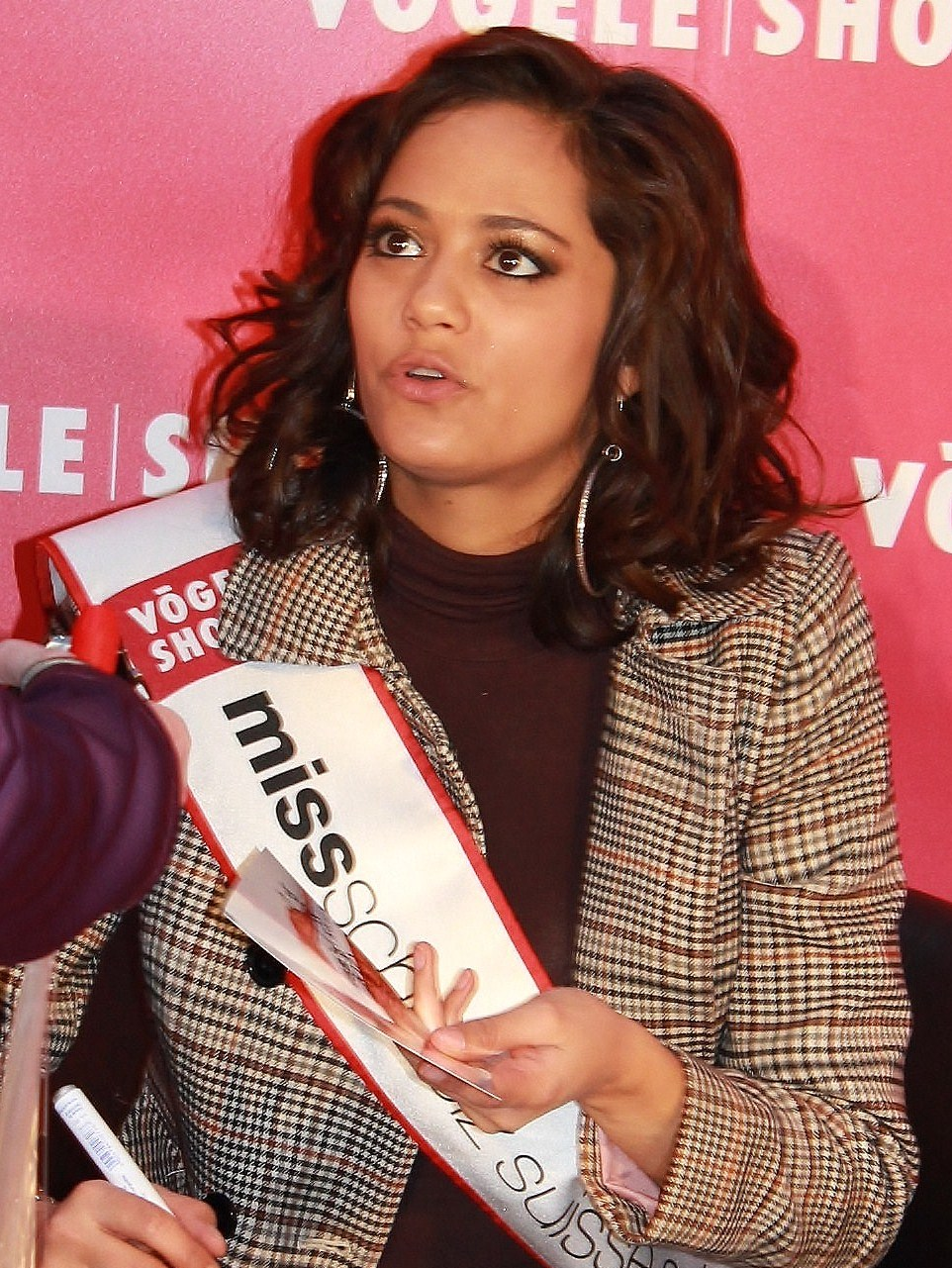
Alina Buchschacher, Miss Switzerland 2011

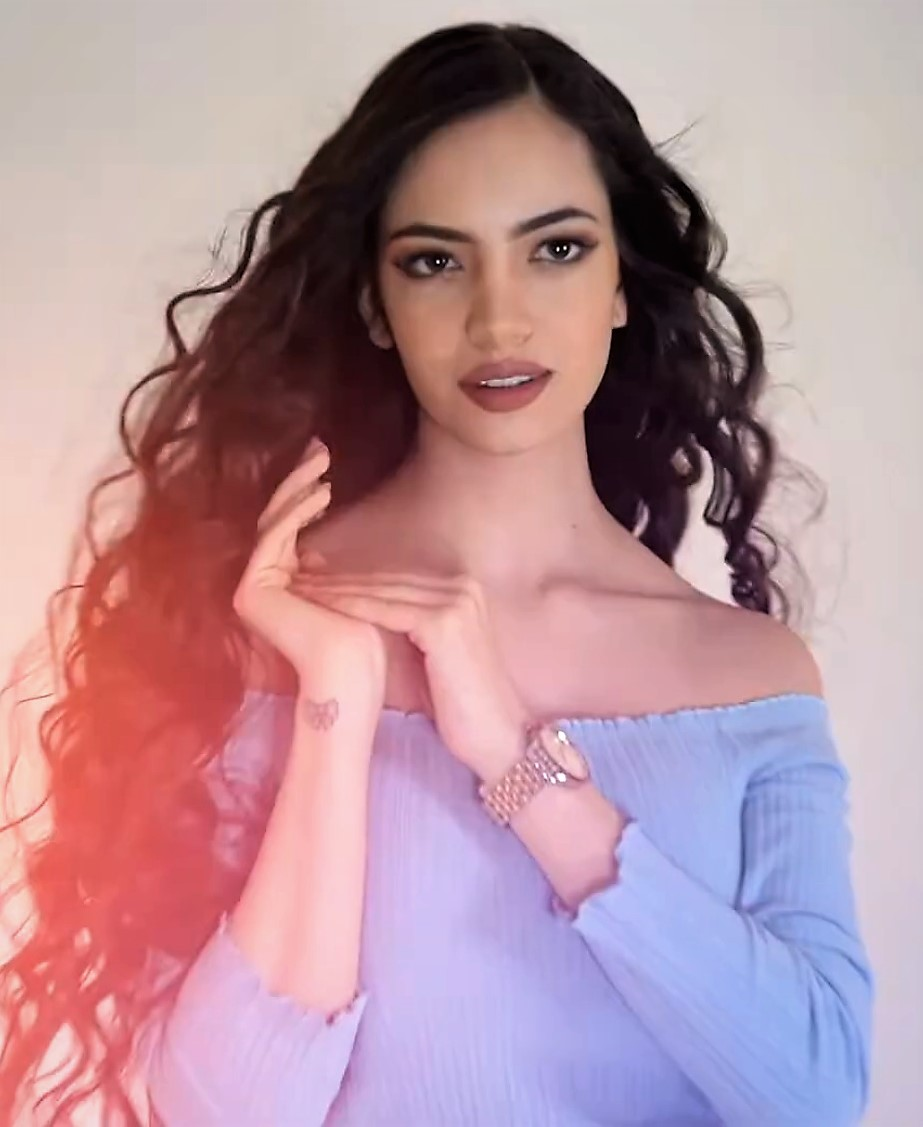
Jastina Doreen Riederer, Miss Switzerland 2018

== Titleholders ==
Year	Miss Suisse / Miss Schweiz / Miss Switzerland	Canton	Notes
1949	Noëlle Stern	Bern	Comité Miss Suisse
1950	France Freiburghaus	Geneva	
1951	Jacqueline Genton	Vaud	Miss Europa 1951
1952	Sylvia Müller	Basel-Stadt	
1953	Danielle Oudinet	Appenzell Ausserrhoden	Sponsored by Bea Kasse4
1954	Claudine Chaperon Du Larrêt-Bühler	Vaud	
1960	Elaine Maurath	Ticino	
1961	Liliane Burnier	Fribourg	
1962	Francine DeLouille	Ticino	
1963	Diana Tanner	Grisons	
1964	Sandra Susler	Vaud	
1965	Yvette Revelly	Glarus	
1966	Hedy Frick	Schwyz	
1967	Elsbeth Ruegger	Basel-Landschaft	
1968	Jeanette Biffiger	Valais	
1969	Patricie Sollner	Aargau	
1970	Diane Jane Roth	Thurgau	
1971	Anita Andrini	Ticino	
1972	Anne Lisse Weber	Zurich	
1973	Barbara Schottli	Zurich	
1974	Christine Lavanchy	Zurich	
1975	Beatrice Aschwanden	Solothurn	Sylvia Grivelli (Valais) directorship
1976	Isabelle Fischbacher	Vaud	Raffy Locher, Christoph Locher, and Karina Berger (Miss Suisse Organisasion AG)
1977	Anja Terzi	Geneva	
1978	Sylvia Vonarx	Appenzell Innerrhoden	
1979	Barbara Mayer	Fribourg	
1980	Margrit Kilchoer	Geneva	
1981	Brigitte Voss	Bern	
1982	Lolita Morena	Geneva	
1984	Silvia Anna Affolter	Zurich	
1985	Eveline Nicole Glanzmann	Aargau	
1986	Renate Walther	Lucerne	
1988	Karina Berger	Zurich	Miss Globe International 1989
1989	Catherine Mesot	Fribourg	
1991	Sandra Aegerter	Aargau	
1992	Valérie Bovard	Vaud	
1993	Patricia Fässler	Zurich	
1994	Sarah Briguet	Valais	
1995	Stéphanie Berger	Zurich	
1996	Melanie Winiger	Ticino	
1997	Tanja Gutmann	Solothurn	
1998	Sonja Grandjean	Zurich	
1999	Anita Buri	Thurgau	
2000	Mahara McKay	Aargau	Switzerland and New Zealand citizenship — Maori origins on her father's side
2001	Jennifer Ann Gerber	Aargau	
2002	Nadine Vinzens	Grisons	
2003	Bianca Nicole Sissing	Lucerne	
2004	Fiona Hefti	Zurich	
2005	Lauriane Gilliéron	Vaud	A daughter of the mayor of Prilly, Alain Gilliéron
2006	Christa Rigozzi	Ticino	
2007	Amanda Ammann	St. Gallen	
2008	Whitney Toyloy	Vaud	
2009	Linda Fäh	St. Gallen	
2010	Kerstin Cook	Lucerne	
2011	Alina Buchschacher	Bern	
2013	Dominique Rinderknecht	Zurich	
2014	Laetitia Guarino	Vaud	
2015	Lauriane Sallin	Fribourg	Longer "reign" of two years and four months
2018	Jastina Doreen Riederer	Aargau	Dethroned — The first Miss Switzerland who dismissed from her title · Angela Fuchs, Iwan Meyer and Andrea Meyer directorship
Year	Miss Universe Switzerland	Canton	Notes
2014	Zoé Metthez	Zürich	François Matthey directorship
2016	Dijana Cvijetić	St. Gallen	Veeranda Aeberli directorship
2022	Alia Giundi	Valais	Bernard Poffet directorship
2023	Lorena Santen	Aargau	
2024	Laura Bircher	Nidwalden	
2025	Naima Acosta	Ticino	

=== Canton Ranking of Winners ===
Canton	Total	Years
Zürich	10	1972, 1973, 1974, 1984, 1988, 1993, 1995, 1998, 2004, 2013
Vaud	8	1951, 1954, 1964, 1976, 1992, 2005, 2008, 2014
Aargau	7	1969, 1985, 1991, 2000, 2001, 2018, 2023
Ticino	6	1960, 1962, 1971, 1996, 2006, 2025
Fribourg	4	1961, 1979, 1989, 2015
Geneva	4	1950, 1977, 1980, 1982
Valais	3	1968, 1994, 2022
Bern	3	1949, 1981, 2011
Lucerne	3	1986, 2003, 2010
St. Gallen	2	2007, 2009
Grisons	2	1963, 2002
Thurgau	2	1970, 1999
Solothurn	2	1975, 1997
Appenzell Ausserrhoden	2	1953, 1978
Nidwalden	1	2024
Basel-Landschaft	1	1967
Schwyz	1	1966
Glarus	1	1965
Basel-Stadt	1	1952

== Titleholders at Miss Universe pageant ==
- : Declared as Winner
- : Ended as runner-up or top 5/6 qualification
- : Ended as one of the finalists or semifinalists
- : Ended as special awards winner

The main winner of Miss Switzerland represents her country at Miss Universe.

Year	Canton	Miss Switzerland	Placement at Miss Universe	Special awards	Notes
Bernard Poffet directorship — a franchise holder to Miss Universe from 2022
2026	Geneva	Itiya Dube	TBA		
2025	Ticino	Naima Acosta	Unplaced		
2024	Nidwalden	Laura Bircher	Unplaced		
2023	Aargau	Lorena Santen	Unplaced		
2022	Valais	Alia Giundi	Unplaced		
Angela Fuchs, Iwan Meyer, and Andrea Meyer directorship — a franchise holder to Miss Universe in 2018
Did not compete between 2019—2021
2018	Aargau	Jastina Doreen Riederer	Unplaced		Dethroned — The first Miss Switzerland who dismissed from her title.
Veeranda Aeberli directorship "Miss Universe Switzerland" — a franchise holder to Miss Universe in 2016
Did not compete in 2017
2016	St. Gallen	Dijana Cvijetić	Unplaced		
François Matthey directorship "Miss Universe Switzerland" — a franchise holder to Miss Universe in 2014
Did not compete in 2015
2014	Zürich	Zoé Metthez	Unplaced		
Miss Schweiz Organisation AG directorship "Miss Schweiz" — a franchise holder to Miss Universe between 1976―2013
2013	Zürich	Dominique Rinderknecht	Top 16		
2012	Bern	Alina Buchschacher	Unplaced		
2011	Lucerne	Kerstin Cook	Unplaced		
2010	St. Gallen	Linda Fäh	Unplaced		
2009	Vaud	Whitney Toyloy	Top 10		
2008	St. Gallen	Amanda Ammann	Unplaced		
2007	Ticino	Christa Rigozzi	Unplaced		
2006	Vaud	Lauriane Gilliéron	2nd Runner-up		
2005	Zürich	Fiona Hefti	Top 10		
2004	Lucerne	Bianca Nicole Sissing	Top 15		
2003	Grisons	Nadine Vinzens	Unplaced		
2002	Aargau	Jennifer Ann Gerber	Unplaced		
2001	Aargau	Mahara McKay	Unplaced		
2000	Thurgau	Anita Buri	Unplaced		
1999	Zürich	Sonja Grandjean	Unplaced		
1998	Solothurn	Tanja Gutman	Unplaced		
1997	Ticino	Melanie Winiger	Unplaced		
1996	Zürich	Stéphanie Berger	Unplaced		
1995	Valais	Sarah Briguet	Unplaced		
1994	Zürich	Patricia Fässler	Top 10		
1993	Vaud	Valérie Bovard	Unplaced		
1992	Aargau	Sandra Aegerter	Unplaced		
Did not compete in 1991
1990	Fribourg	Catherine Mesot	Unplaced		
1989	Zürich	Karina Berger	Unplaced		Miss Globe International 1989
1988	Zürich	Gabriela Bigler	Unplaced		Designation — Gabriela was designated as Miss Universe Switzerland by Miss Schweiz Organization.
1987	Lucerne	Renate Walther	Unplaced		
1986	Aargau	Eveline Nicole Glanzmann	Top 10		
Did not compete in 1985
1984	Zürich	Silvia Anna Affolter	Unplaced		
1983	Geneva	Lolita Morena	3rd Runner-up	Miss Photogenic	
1982	Zürich	Jeanette Linkenheil	Unplaced		Designation — Jeanette was designated as Miss Universe Switzerland by Miss Schweiz Organization.
1981	Bern	Brigitte Voss	Unplaced		
1980	Geneva	Margrit Kilchoer	Unplaced		
1979	Geneva	Birgit Krahel	Unplaced		Runner-up took over after the winner did not compete at Miss Universe 1979.
1978	Appenzell Innerrhoden	Sylvia Vonarx	Unplaced		
1977	Geneva	Anja Terzi	Unplaced		
1976	Vaud	Isabelle Fischbacher	Unplaced		
1975	Solothurn	Beatrice Aschwanden	Unplaced		
1974	Zürich	Christine Lavanchy	Unplaced		
1973	Zürich	Barbara Schottli	Unplaced		
1972	Zürich	Anne Lisse Weber	Unplaced		
1971	Ticino	Anita Andrini	Unplaced		
1970	Thurgau	Diane Jane Roth	Top 15		
1969	Aargau	Patricie Sollner	Top 15		
1968	Valais	Jeanette Biffiger	Unplaced		
1967	Basel-Landschaft	Elsbeth Ruegger	Unplaced		
1966	Schwyz	Hedy Frick	Unplaced		
1965	Glarus	Yvette Revelly	Unplaced		
1964	Vaud	Sandra Susler	Unplaced		
1963	Grisons	Diana Tanner	Unplaced		
1962	Ticino	Francine DeLouille	Unplaced		
1961	Fribourg	Liliane Burnier	Top 15		
1960	Ticino	Elaine Maurath	Top 15		
Did not compete between 1954—1959
1953	Appenzell Ausserrhoden	Danielle Oudinet	Unplaced		Sponsored by Bea Kasse4.

== See also ==
- Miss World Switzerland
