= Miss Universe 1968 =

17th Miss Universe pageant

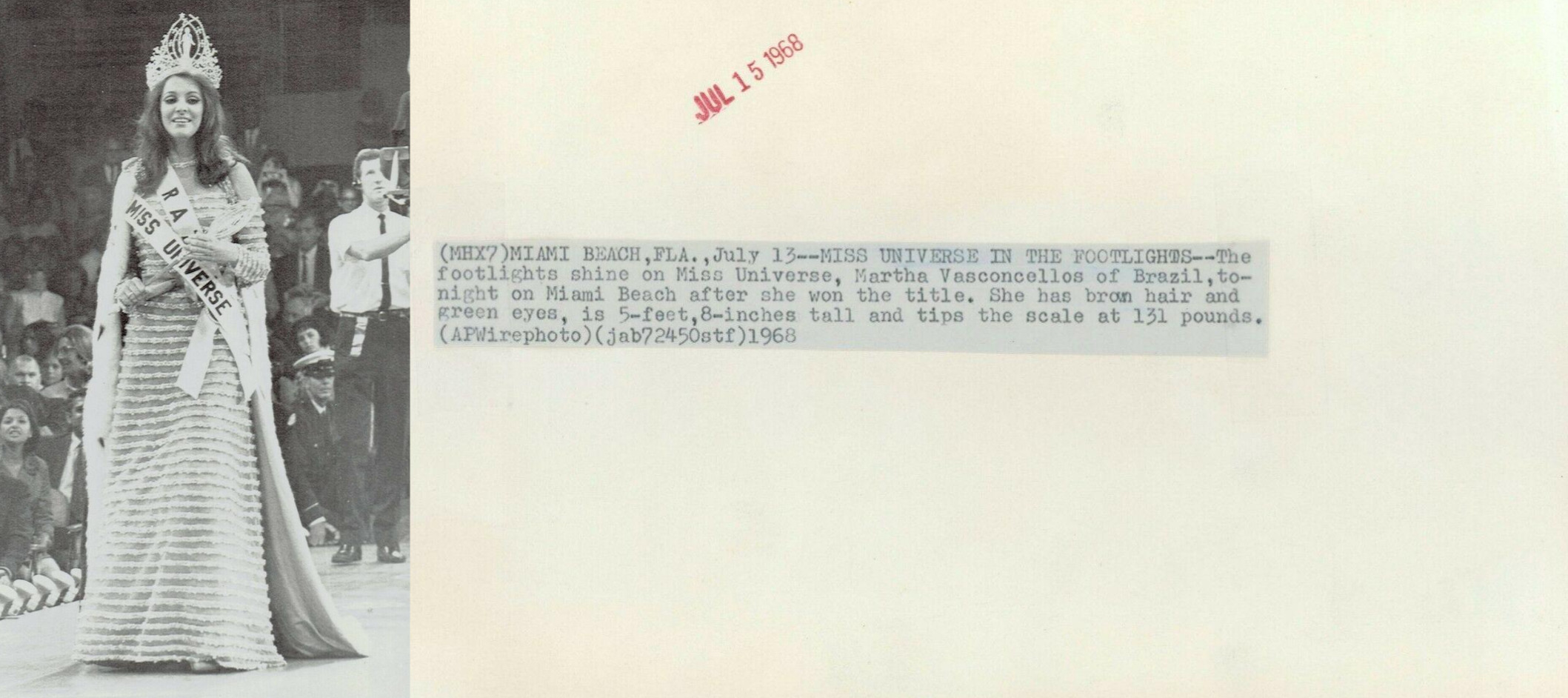
- Martha Vasconcellos
- Date: 13 July 1968
- Presenters: Bob Barker; June Lockhart
- Venue: Miami Beach Auditorium, Miami Beach, Florida, United States
- Broadcaster: CBS
- Entrants: 65
- Placements: 15
- Debuts: Congo-Kinshasa; Malta; Yugoslavia
- Withdrawals: Cuba; Panama; Paraguay
- Returns: Australia; Ceylon; Ecuador; Haiti; Jamaica; Lebanon; Nicaragua; Thailand; Tunisia
- Winner: Martha Vasconcellos; Brazil
- Congeniality: Yasuyo Iino (Japan)
- Best National Costume: Luz Elena Restrepo (Colombia)
- Photogenic: Daliborka Stojšić (Yugoslavia)

Miss Universe 1968 was the 17th Miss Universe pageant, held at the Miami Beach Auditorium in Miami Beach, Florida, on 13 July 1968.

At the conclusion of the event, Sylvia Hitchcock of the United States crowned Martha Vasconcellos of Brazil as Miss Universe 1968. It is the second victory for Brazil in the history of the pageant.

Contestants from sixty-five countries and territories competed in this edition. The pageant was hosted by Bob Barker, while Actress June Lockhart provided commentary throughout the competition.

== Background ==
=== Selection of participants ===
Contestants from sixty-five countries and territories were selected to compete in the pageant. Two candidates were appointed to represent their country to replace the original dethroned winner.

==== Replacements ====
Miss Australia 1968, Helen Newton, withdrew after her sponsor decided not to participate in the competition. As a result, the rights to choose the Australian candidate for Miss Universe went to the Queen of Quests competition, which was won by Lauren Jones.

Elizabeth Cadren, second runner-up of Miss France 1968, was appointed as the French candidate for Miss Universe after Miss France 1968, Christiane Lillio, decided that she will not compete in any international competition.

Debuts, returns, and withdrawals

This edition saw the debuts of Congo-Kinshasa, Malta, and Yugoslavia, and the returns of Haiti which last competed in 1962; Australia and Tunisia in 1965; and Ceylon, Ecuador, Jamaica, Lebanon, Nicaragua, and Thailand last competed in 1966. Cuba, Panama, and Paraguay withdrew after their respective organizations failed to hold a national competition or appoint a delegate.

Miss Morocco, Zakia Chamouch, was set to compete but withdrew for being underage.

== Results ==
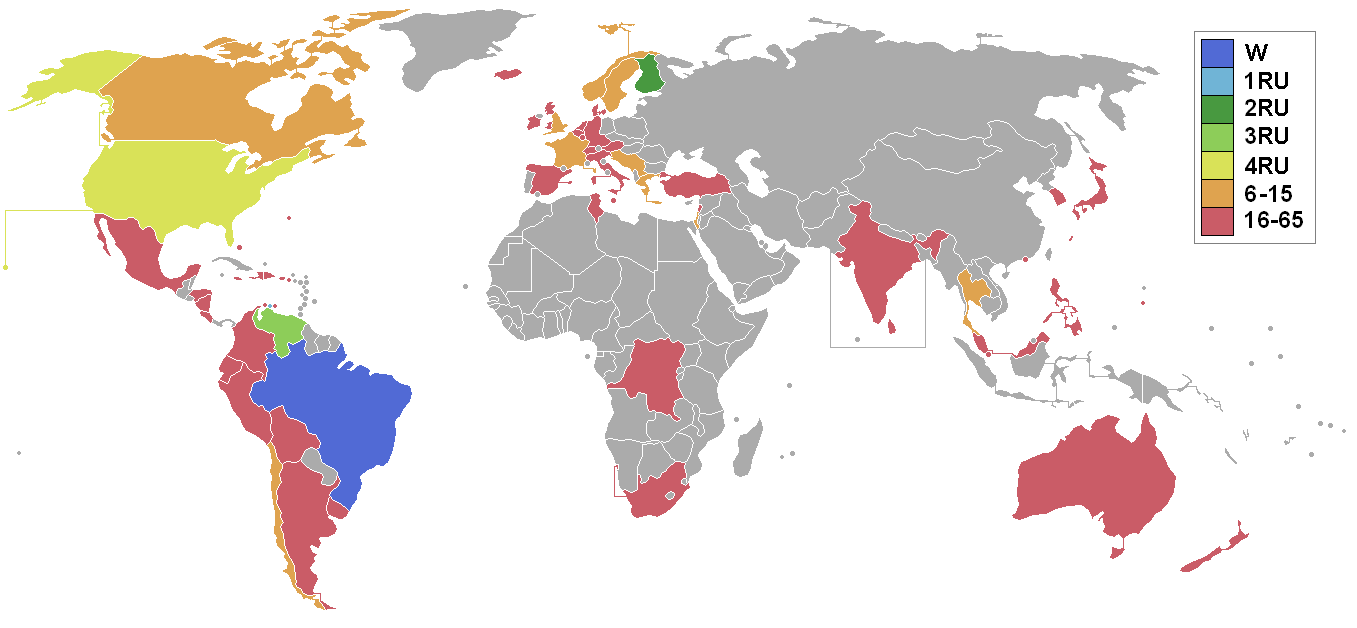
Miss Universe 1968 participating countries and territories

=== Placements ===
Placement	Contestant
Miss Universe 1968	Brazil – Martha Vasconcellos
1st Runner-Up	Curaçao – Anne Braafheid
2nd Runner-Up	Finland – Leena Brusiin
3rd Runner-Up	Venezuela – Peggy Kopp
4th Runner-Up	United States – Dorothy Anstett
Top 15	Canada – Nancy Wilson; Chile – Dánae Salas; England – Jennifer Summers; France – Elizabeth Cadren; Greece – Miranta Zafiropoulou; Israel – Miriam Fridman; Norway – Tone Knaran; Sweden – Anne Hellqvist; Thailand – Apantree Prayutsenee; Yugoslavia – Daliborka Stojšić

==== Special awards ====
Award	Contestant
Miss Amity	Japan – Yasuyo Iino
Miss Photogenic	Yugoslavia – Daliborka Stojšić
Best National Costume	Colombia – Luz Elena Restrepo
Top 15 Best in Swimsuit	Bolivia – Roxana Bowles; Brazil – Martha Vasconcellos; Canada – Nancy Wilson; Curaçao – Anne Braafheid; England – Jennifer Summers; France – Elizabeth Cadren; Greece – Miranta Zafiropoulou; Israel – Miriam Fridman; Nicaragua – Margine Davidson; South Africa – Monica Fairall; South Korea – Yoon-jung Kim; Sweden – Anne Hellqvist; Thailand – Apantree Prayutsenee; United States – Dorothy Anstett; Yugoslavia – Daliborka Stojšić

== Pageant ==
=== Format ===
Same with 1966, fifteen semi-finalists were chosen at the preliminary competition that consists of the swimsuit and evening gown competition. Each of the fifteen semi-finalists were individually interviewed by Bob Barker. Following the interviews, the fifteen semi-finalists participated in the swimsuit and evening gown competitions. From fifteen, five contestants were shortlisted to advance to the final interview.

=== Selection committee ===
- Edilson Cid Varela – Brazilian journalist
- Sara Lou Harris Carter – African-American model
- Hideo Den – Japanese news presenter
- Yousuf Karsh – Armenian-Canadian photographer
- Dong Kingman – Chinese-American painter
- Orna Porat – German-born Israeli theater actress
- Edwin Acosta Rubio – Venezuelan newspaper and advertising executive
- Miriam Stevenson – Miss Universe 1954 from the United States
- Earl Wilson – American columnist and journalist

== Contestants ==
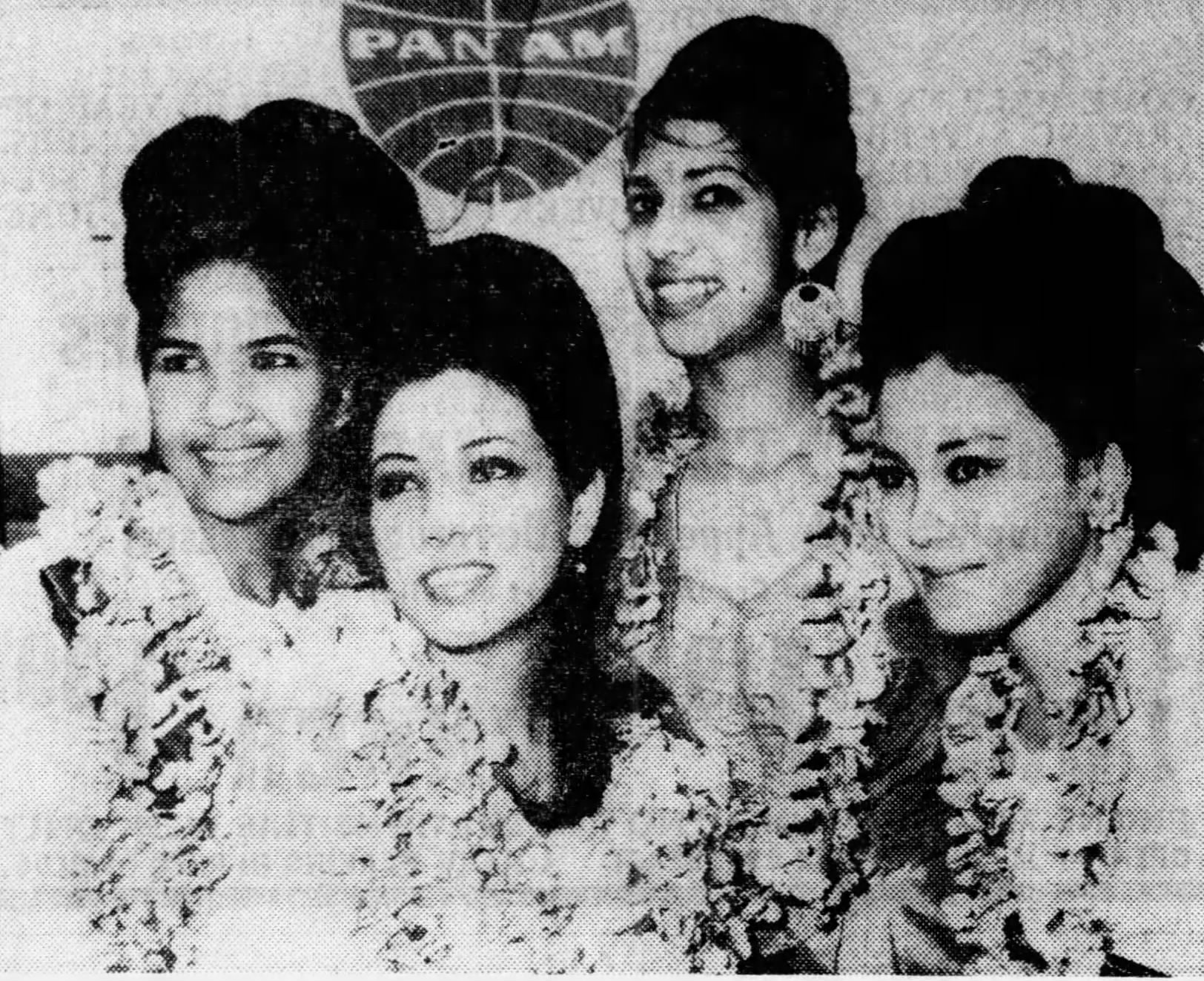
Contestants from Guam, the Philippines, Singapore, and Malaysia

Sixty-five contestants competed for the title.

Country/Territory	Contestant	Age (Note: Ages at the time of the pageant)	Hometown
Argentina	María Jordán Vidal	23	Buenos Aires
Aruba	Sandra Croes	18	Oranjestad
Australia	Lauren Jones	21	Sydney
Austria	Brigitte Krüger	24	Vienna
Bahamas	Brenda Fountain	20	Nassau
Belgium	Sonja Doumen	20	Dilsen-Stokkem
Bermuda	Victoria Martin	23	Pembroke Parish
Bolivia	Roxana Bowles	18	Santa Cruz de la Sierra
Bonaire	Ilse de Jong	18	Kralendijk
Brazil	Martha Vasconcellos	20	Salvador
Canada	Nancy Wilson	19	Chatham-Kent
Ceylon	Sheila Jayatilleke	18	Colombo
Chile	Dánae Salas	22	Santiago
Colombia	Luz Elena Restrepo	18	Barranquilla
Costa Rica	Ana María Rivera	19	San José
Curaçao	Anne Braafheid	21	Willemstad
Democratic Republic of the Congo	Elizabeth Tavares	20	Kinshasa
Denmark	Gitte Broge	20	Copenhagen
Dominican Republic	Ana María Ortíz	18	Santo Domingo
Ecuador	Priscila Álava	18	Guayaquil
England	Jennifer Summers	22	London
Finland	Leena Brusiin	22	Helsinki
France	Elizabeth Cadren	22	Paris
Greece	Miranta Zafiropoulou	22	Athens
Guam	Arlene Chaco	21	Agana
Haiti	Claudie Paquin	18	Port-au-Prince
Holland	Nathalie Heyl	21	The Hague
Honduras	Nora Guillén	19	Tegucigalpa
Hong Kong	Tammy Yung	18	Hong Kong
Iceland	Helen Knuttsdóttir	18	Reykjavík
India	Anjum Mumtaz Barg	23	Hyderabad
Ireland	Tiffany Scales	22	Dublin
Israel	Miriam Friedman	18	Tel Aviv
Italy	Cristina Businari	18	Rome
Jamaica	Marjorie Bromfield	19	Kingston
Japan	Yasuyo Iino	18	Tokyo
Lebanon	Sonia Fares	18	Beirut
Luxembourg	Lucienne Krier	18	Esch-sur-Alzette
Malaysia	Maznah Ali	20	Johor Bahru
Malta	Kathlene Farrugia	22	Qormi
Mexico	Perla Aguirre	18	Mexico City
New Zealand	Christine Antunovic	18	Auckland
Nicaragua	Margine Davidson	20	Matagalpa
Norway	Tone Knaran	18	Oslo
Okinawa	Sachie Kawamitsu	19	Naha
Peru	María Esther Brambilla	19	Lima
Philippines	Rosario Zaragoza	18	Quezon City
Puerto Rico	Marylene Carrasquillo	19	Santurce
Scotland	Helen Davidson	22	Glasgow
Singapore	Yasmin Saif	19	Singapore
South Africa	Monica Fairall	20	Durban
South Korea	Yoon-jung Kim	18	Seoul
Spain	Yolanda Legarreta	18	Basque Country
Sweden	Anne Hellqvist	18	Hallsberg
Switzerland	Jeannette Biffiger	19	Zürich
Thailand	Apantree Prayutsenee	20	Phra Nakhon
Tunisia	Rekaia Dekhil	20	Tunis
Turkey	Zuhal Aktan	18	Istanbul
United States	Dorothy Anstett	21	Kirkland
United States Virgin Islands	Sadie Sargeant	19	Charlotte Amalie
Uruguay	Graciela Minarrieta	20	Montevideo
Venezuela	Peggy Kopp	18	Caracas
Wales	Judith Radford	19	Swansea
West Germany	Lilian Atterer	20	Bavaria
Yugoslavia	Daliborka Stojšić	23	Belgrade
