= Linda Fäh =

Swiss singer, model and beauty pageant titleholder

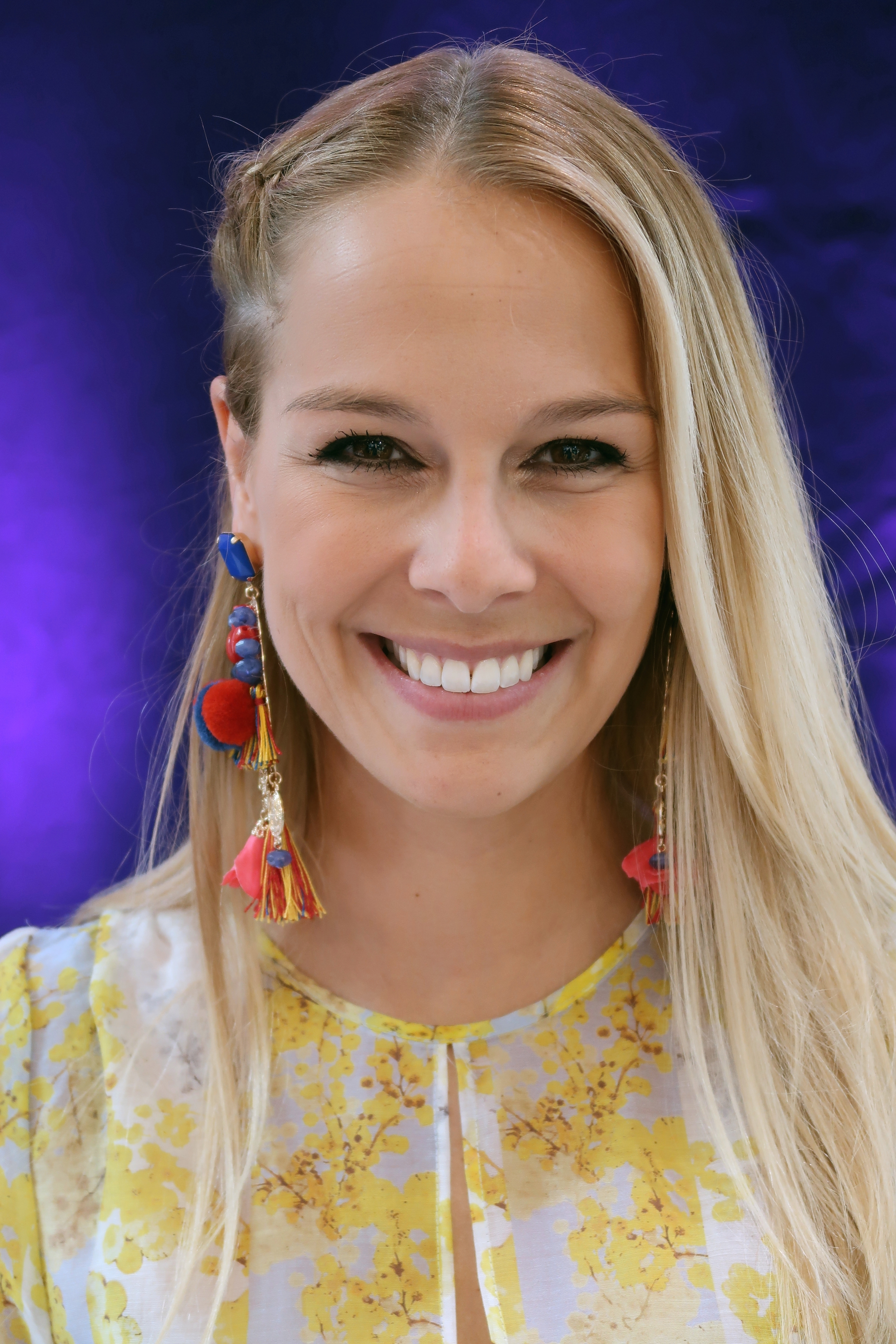
- Fäh in 2017
- Born: Linda Fäh; 10 November 1987 (age 38); Benken, Switzerland
- Height: 1.77 m (5 ft 9 1/2 in)
- Beauty pageant titleholder
- Title: Miss Switzerland 2009
- Hair color: Blonde
- Eye color: Brown
- Major competitions: Miss Switzerland 2009 (Winner); Miss Universe 2010 (Unplaced)

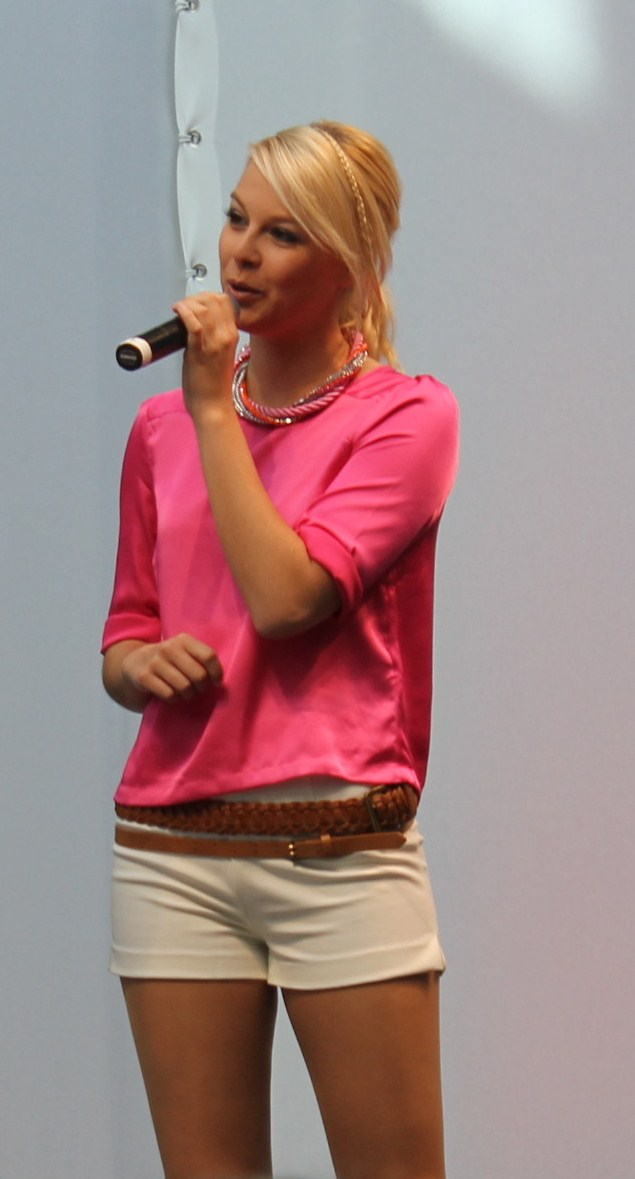
Fäh sings in 2012

Linda Fäh (born 10 November 1987) is a Swiss singer, model and beauty pageant titleholder. She won the Miss Switzerland title in 2009. Although Fäh was a favorite for 2010 Miss Universe pageant, she failed to place. As an attempt to start her musical career, Linda released an album in September 2015 under the label Telamo (Warner). The album is titled "Du Kannst Fliegen" (meaning "You Can Fly").

Awards and achievements
Preceded by Whitney Toyloy	Miss Switzerland; 2009	Succeeded by Kerstin Cook
