= Braafheid =

Braafheid is a surname. Notable people with the surname include:

- Anne Marie Braafheid, Miss Universe contestant
- Edson Braafheid (born 1983), Dutch footballer
