= Miss World 1968 =

18th Miss World pageant

- Penelope Plummer
- Date: 14 November 1968
- Presenters: Michael Aspel
- Venue: Lyceum Ballroom, London, United Kingdom
- Broadcaster: BBC
- Entrants: 53
- Placements: 15
- Debuts: Thailand
- Withdrawals: Czechoslovakia; Gambia; Honduras; Iceland; Lebanon; Panama; Portugal; Tanzania
- Returns: Bahamas; Colombia; India; Liberia; Nicaragua
- Winner: Penelope Plummer; Australia

Miss World 1968 was the 18th edition of the Miss World pageant held at the Lyceum Ballroom in London, United Kingdom on 14 November 1968. This was the last edition of the competition to take place at the Lyceum Ballroom.

At the end of the competition, Madeleine Hartog-Bel of Peru crowned Penelope Plummer of Australia as Miss World 1968. This was Australia's first-ever victory in the history of the competition. Kathleen Winstanley of the United Kingdom finished as first runner-up, while Miri Zamir of Israel finished as second runner-up.

Contestants from fifty-three countries and territories participated in this competition. Michael Aspel hosted the competition.

== Background ==
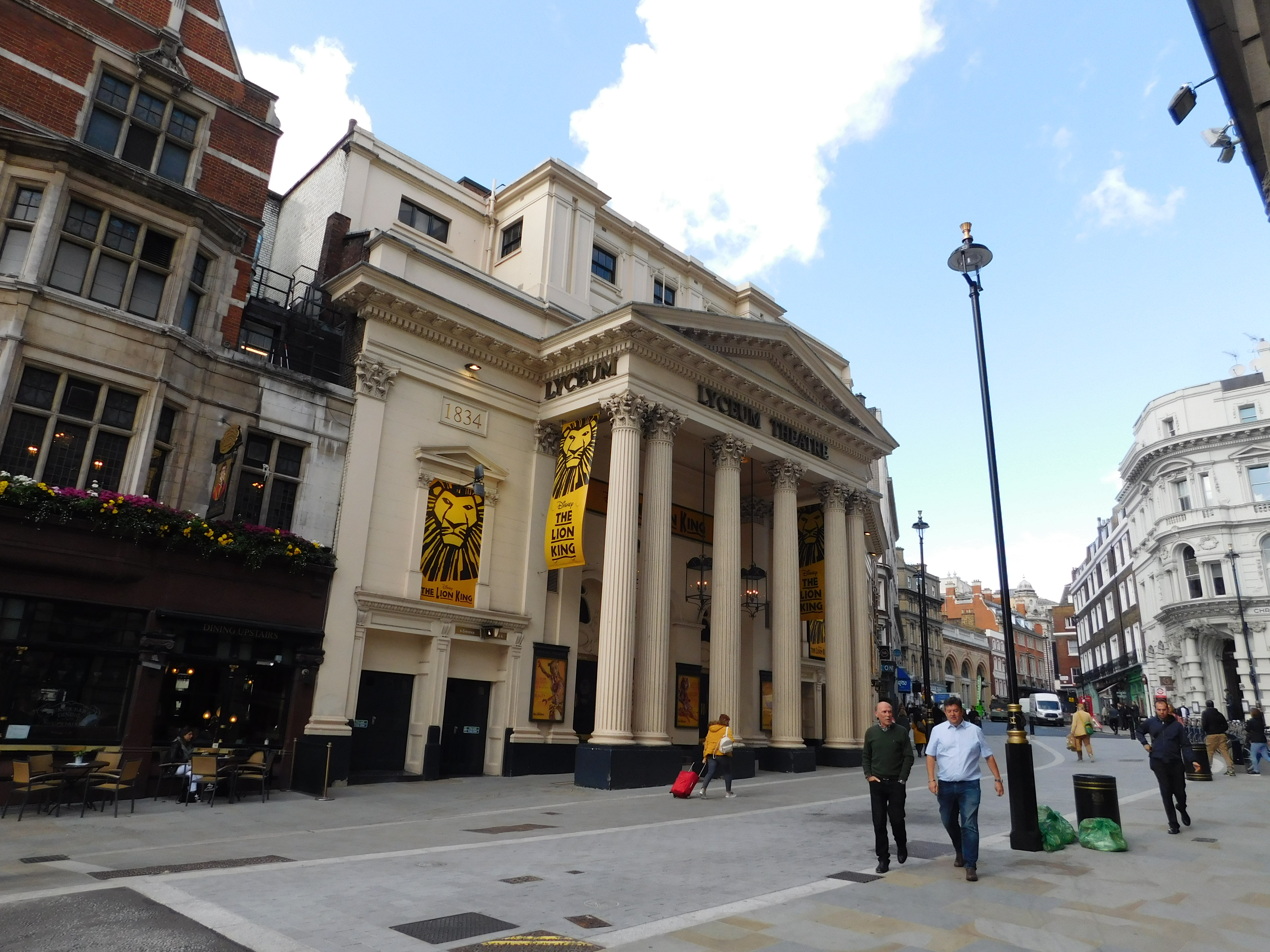
Lyceum Ballroom, the venue of Miss World 1968

=== Selection of participants ===
Contestants from fifty-three countries and territories were selected to compete in the competition. Two candidates were appointed to represent their countries/territories after placing as runners-up in their national competition, or were chosen through a casting process, and two candidates were appointed after the original contestants withdrew.

==== Rule changes ====
Mothers were once again allowed to compete in Miss World in this edition, something that was last permitted during 1951. Due to this policy change in Miss World, Miss International Bahamas 1968 Rose Helena Simms-Dauchot was allowed to participate in this edition even though she was married and had a child.

==== Replacements ====
Although it had been announced that France's candidate for this edition would be Mademoiselle France 1968 Maryvonne Lachaze, she was suddenly replaced by Miss Cinemonde first runner-up Nelly Gallerne due to an undisclosed reason. Miss Luxembourg 1968 first runner-up Irene Siedler was appointed to compete in this edition after the original winner, Lucienne Micheline Krier, withdrew from the competition due to an undisclosed reason.

==== Debuts, returns, and withdrawals ====
Thailand competed for the first time. Returning to this edition were Nicaragua, which last competed in 1964; Colombia and Liberia, which last competed in 1965; and the Bahamas and India, which last competed in 1966.

The countries Czechoslovakia, Gambia, Honduras, Iceland, Lebanon, Panama, Portugal, and Tanzania did not compete in this edition. Jarmila Teplanová of Czechoslovakia did not participate due to the invasion of Czechoslovakia by the Soviet Union, Poland, Bulgaria, and Hungary on 20 August 1968. Lillian Carol Heyer of Honduras and Helga Jonsdóttir of Iceland did not participate due to undisclosed reasons. Lili Bissar of Lebanon was disqualified after it was discovered that she was only fifteen years old. Although no longer in the competition, Bissar was still permitted to appear in the parade of nations. Zena Suleiman was not permitted by the Government of Tanzania to participate in Miss World because it was allegedly incompatible with their culture.

Maria Amparo Rodrigo Lorenzo of Spain was supposed to participate in this edition, having already traveled to London to compete in Miss World. However, much like her predecessors, Rodrigo immediately withdrew from the competition due to her opposition to the participation of Sandra Sanguinetti of Gibraltar. Following her withdrawal from the competition, Lorenzo immediately fled the candidates' hotel to go to the hotel where her ninety-two relatives were temporarily staying.

== Results ==
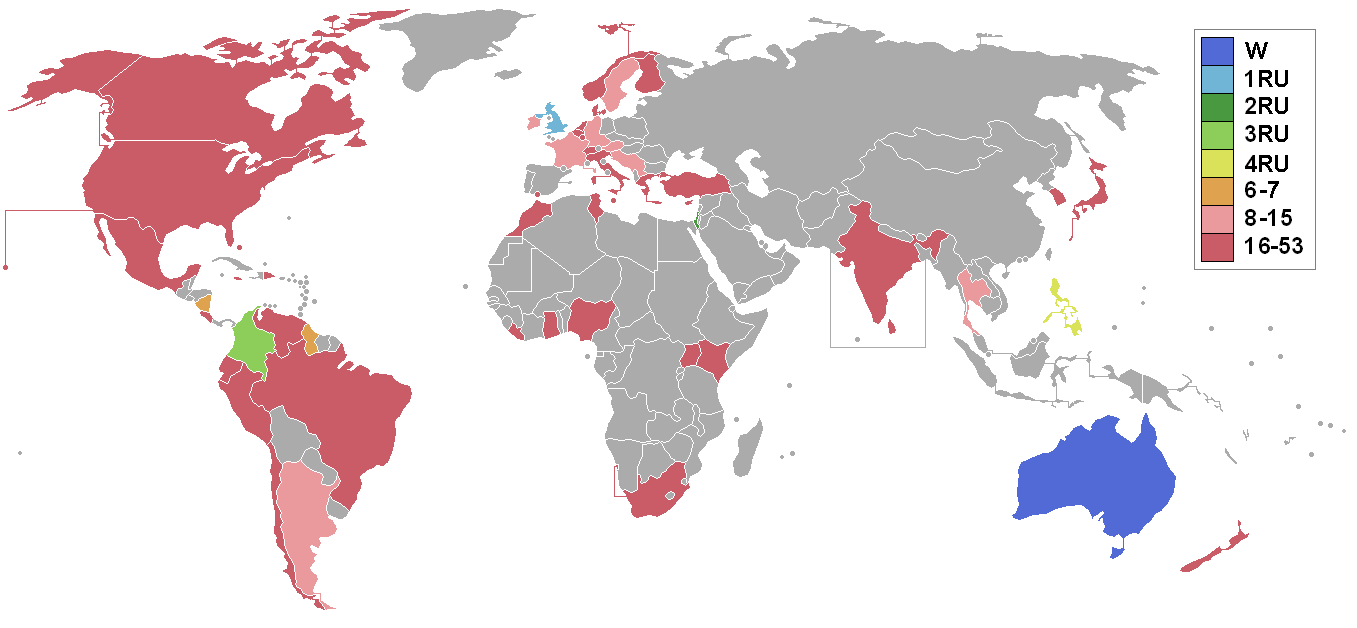
Countries and territories that participated in Miss World 1968 and their placements.

=== Placements ===
| Placement | Contestant |
|---|---|
| Miss World 1968 | Australia – Penelope Plummer |
| 1st runner-up | (United Kingdom) United Kingdom – Kathleen Winstanley |
| 2nd runner-up | Israel – Miri Zamir |
| 3rd runner-up | Colombia – Beatriz Sierra González |
| 4th runner-up | Philippines – Arene Cecilia Amabuyok |
| Top 7 | Guyana – Adrienne Harris; Nicaragua– Margine Davidson |
| Top 15 | Argentina – Viviana Roldán; Austria – Brigitte Krüger; France – Nelly Gallerne; Germany – Margot Schmalzriedt; (Republic of Ireland) Ireland – June MacMahon; Sweden – Gunilla Friden; Thailand – Pinnarut Tananchai; Yugoslavia – Ivona Puhlera |

== Pageant ==
=== Format ===
As in 1961, fifteen semi-finalists were chosen through a preliminary competition held on the day of the final competition, which consisted of the swimsuit and evening gown competitions. The fifteen semi-finalists competed in the swimsuit and evening gown competitions, and seven finalists were subsequently selected to advance to the final interview.

=== Selection committee ===
- Lady Elizabeth Anson, CVO
- Stanley Baker – English actor
- Reita Faria – Miss World 1966 from India
- Peter Dimmock – An executive from the BBC
- Graham Hill – English Formula One winner
- John Hore – English footballer
- Istvan Kertesz – Hungarian conductor
- Anthony Seth – High Commissioner of Ghana to the United Kingdom
- Richard Todd – Irish actor

== Contestants ==
Fifty-three contestants competed for the title.

| Country/Territory | Contestant | Age (Note: Ages at the time of the competition) | Hometown |
|---|---|---|---|
| Argentina | Viviana Roldán | 25 | Esperanza |
| Australia | Penelope Plummer | 18 | Sydney |
| Austria | Brigitte Krüger | 24 | Vienna |
| Bahamas | Rose Helena Simms-Dauchot | 25 | Nassau |
| Belgium | Sonja Doumen | 20 | Dilsen-Stokkem |
| Brazil | Ângela Stecca | 18 | Minas Gerais |
| Canada | Nancy Wilson | 19 | Chatham |
| (Sri Lanka) Ceylon | Nilanthi Wijesinghe | 22 | Colombo |
| Chile | Carmen Smith | – | Santiago |
| Colombia | Beatriz Sierra González | 20 | Cartagena |
| Costa Rica | Patricia Diers | 23 | San José |
| Cyprus | Diana Dimitropoulou | 19 | Nicosia |
| Denmark | Yet Schaufuss | – | Copenhagen |
| Dominican Republic | Ingrid García | 17 | Santo Domingo |
| Ecuador | Marcia Virginia Ramos | 20 | Guayaquil |
| Finland | Leena Sipilä | 24 | Helsinki |
| France | Nelly Gallerne | 22 | Paris |
| Germany | Margot Schmalzriedt | 22 | Stuttgart |
| Ghana | Lovell Wordie | 19 | Accra |
| Gibraltar | Sandra Sanguinetti | 18 | Gibraltar |
| Greece | Lia Malta | 21 | Athens |
| Guyana | Adrienne Harris | 20 | Georgetown |
| (Netherlands) Holland | Alida Grootenboer | 20 | Amersfoort |
| India | Jane Coelho | 24 | New Delhi |
| (Republic of Ireland) Ireland | June MacMahon | 24 | Dublin |
| Israel | Miri Zamir | 18 | Haifa |
| Italy | Maria Pia Giamporcaro | 18 | Palermo |
| Jamaica | Karlene Waddell | 18 | Kingston |
| Japan | Ryoko Miyoshi | 20 | Hokkaidō |
| Kenya | Josephine Moikobu | 23 | Nairobi |
| Liberia | Wilhelmina Nadieh Brownell | – | Monrovia |
| Luxembourg | Irene Siedler | 18 | Esch-sur-Alzette |
| Malta | Ursulina Grech | 17 | Gozo |
| Mexico | Ana María Magaña | 17 | Mexico City |
| Morocco | Zakia Chamouch | 17 | Casablanca |
| New Zealand | Christine Antunovic | 18 | Auckland |
| Nicaragua | Margine Davidson | 20 | Matagalpa |
| Nigeria | Foluke Ogundipe | 21 | Lagos |
| Norway | Hedda Lie | 21 | Stokke |
| Peru | Ana Rosa Berninzon | 18 | Lima |
| Philippines | Arene Cecilia Amabuyok | 17 | Makati |
| South Africa | Mitsianna Stander | 19 | Johannesburg |
| South Korea | Lee Ji-eun | 21 | Daegu |
| Sweden | Gunilla Friden | 19 | Stockholm |
| Switzerland | Jeanette Biffiger | 19 | Zürich |
| Thailand | Pinnarut Tananchai | 19 | Chiang Mai |
| Tunisia | Zohra Boufaden | 20 | Tunis |
| Turkey | Mine Kurkcuoglu | 17 | Istanbul |
| Uganda | Joy Lehai | 22 | Kampala |
| (United Kingdom) United Kingdom | Kathleen Winstanley | 22 | Wigan |
| United States | Johnine Avery | 22 | Olympia |
| Venezuela | Cherry Núñez | 18 | Caracas |
| Yugoslavia | Ivona Puhlera | 17 | Dubrovnik |
