= Anita Buri =

Swiss beauty pageant contestant

- Born: Anita Buri; July 3, 1978 (age 46); Berg, Switzerland
- Beauty pageant titleholder
- Title: Swiss television host, Model and Miss Switzerland 1999

Anita Buri (born July 3, 1978) is a Swiss TV host, model and beauty pageant titleholder who was crowned Miss World Switzerland 1999.

The commercial business clerk from Berg (TG) was crowned Miss Switzerland in Lugano in 1999. During her year of office she represented Switzerland at the Miss World Competition 1999 in London and the Miss Universe Competition 2000 in Cyprus.

She was married for 5 years to former national soccer player Marc Hodel. They have one son, born in 2002.

Sport is an important part of her life. She has been dancing since the age 6 years - Ballet, Jazz, Hip Hop, Streetdance and Latin. She ran the Ladystyle-Show-Dance Group for 2 years, along with Sonia Granjean (Miss Switzerland 1998) and the Professional Dancer and Choreographer Eljadusa Kedves. In the German-speaking part of Switzerland, she is the Fitness Ambassador for Fitness for Kids which teaches children about the importance of movement in their everyday lives.

Anita Buri works as a model (shootings, catwalk and television spots) and as a host for events and television. From 2011 to 2014 the Thurgauer and Argauer by choice, was host of the Tele Top Television Talkshow Top Talk.

At present, she is the representative and ambassador for the online shop intimates.ch, presents fitness exercises for newmove.ch and designs her own handbag collection Blembal.

Preceded by Sonja Grandjean	Miss Switzerland; 1999	Succeeded by Mahara McKay
