= Glauser =

Glauser is a surname. Notable people with the surname include:

- Calvin Henry Glauser (1923–2007), Canadian bank employee and political figure in Saskatchewan
- Elisabeth Glauser (born 1943), Swiss operatic mezzo-soprano and academic voice teacher
- Friedrich Glauser (1896–1938), Swiss writer
- Hansruedi Glauser (1945–2014), Swiss chess master
- Laura Glauser (born 1993), French handballer in the French national team
- Nelly Glauser (born 1966), Swiss long-distance runner
- Tamy Glauser (born 1985), Swiss model
