= List of protected heritage sites in Dilsen-Stokkem (part 2) =

This table shows an overview of the protected heritage sites in the Flemish town Dilsen-Stokkem. This list is part of Belgium's national heritage.

Object	Status^{?}	Year/architect	Town/section	Address	Coordinates	Number^{?}	Image
Single residential house ^{(nl)} ^{(fr)}			Dilsen-Stokkem	Kanaalstraat 11	51.05464°N 5.69993°E	71546 Info	
Mansion ^{(nl)} ^{(fr)}			Dilsen-Stokkem	Kempenstraat 21	51.05115°N 5.74016°E	71548 Info	
Farm ^{(nl)} ^{(fr)}			Dilsen-Stokkem	Kempenstraat 31	51.05098°N 5.74184°E	71549 Info	
"Kesselshoeve" ^{(nl)}	Yes		Dilsen-Stokkem	Kempenstraat 41	51.05056°N 5.74357°E	71550 Info	
Small village house ^{(nl)} ^{(fr)}			Dilsen-Stokkem	Kempenstraat 65	51.04998°N 5.74632°E	71551 Info	
Cast iron pump ^{(nl)} ^{(fr)}	Yes		Dilsen-Stokkem	Kempenstraat	51.04998°N 5.74730°E	71552 Info	
Chapel ^{(nl)} ^{(fr)}			Dilsen-Stokkem	Klaverstraat	51.06103°N 5.72385°E	71553 Info	
Farmhouse with separate components ^{(nl)} ^{(fr)}			Dilsen-Stokkem	Klaverstraat 1	51.06071°N 5.73051°E	71554 Info	
elongated farm ^{(nl)} ^{(fr)}			Dilsen-Stokkem	Klaverstraat 7	51.06069°N 5.72976°E	71555 Info	
Village house ^{(nl)} ^{(fr)}			Dilsen-Stokkem	Klaverstraat 56	51.06115°N 5.72422°E	71556 Info	
Chapel of 1910 ^{(nl)} ^{(fr)}			Dilsen-Stokkem	Pastoorstraat	51.05296°N 5.74736°E	71557 Info	
elongated farm ^{(nl)} ^{(fr)}			Dilsen-Stokkem	Pastoorstraat 18	51.05396°N 5.74538°E	71558 Info	
Small farm ^{(nl)} ^{(fr)}			Dilsen-Stokkem	Potstraat 15	51.05150°N 5.72996°E	71559 Info	
"Köstersgoed" ^{(nl)}	Yes		Dilsen-Stokkem	Reselt 1	51.05699°N 5.72709°E	71560 Info	
Wooden cross ^{(nl)} ^{(fr)}			Dilsen-Stokkem	Vaartstraat	51.05498°N 5.70158°E	71562 Info	
House ^{(nl)} ^{(fr)}			Dilsen-Stokkem	Veldsteeg 1	51.05837°N 5.73124°E	71563 Info	
Chapel of Our Lady of Assistance ^{(nl)} ^{(fr)}	Yes		Dilsen-Stokkem	Arnold-Sauwenlaan 53	51.01912°N 5.73737°E	71564 Info	
Notary's house Elens ^{(nl)} ^{(fr)}			Dilsen-Stokkem	Arnold-Sauwenlaan 80	51.02004°N 5.74083°E	71565 Info	
Catholic Circle ^{(nl)} ^{(fr)}			Dilsen-Stokkem	Arnold-Sauwenlaan 90	51.01997°N 5.74191°E	71566 Info	
Small double house ^{(nl)} ^{(fr)}			Dilsen-Stokkem	Botermarkt 22	51.02144°N 5.74445°E	71567 Info	
Chapel of Our Lady of Seven Sorrows ^{(nl)} ^{(fr)}	Yes		Dilsen-Stokkem	Boyen	51.03233°N 5.75239°E	71568 Info	
elongated farm and cafe ^{(nl)} ^{(fr)}			Dilsen-Stokkem	Boyen 3	51.03244°N 5.75446°E	71569 Info	
Farmhouse with separate components ^{(nl)} ^{(fr)}			Dilsen-Stokkem	Boyen 12	51.03348°N 5.75364°E	71570 Info	
Farmhouse with separate components ^{(nl)} ^{(fr)}			Dilsen-Stokkem	Boyen 14	51.03362°N 5.75371°E	71571 Info	
elongated farm ^{(nl)} ^{(fr)}			Dilsen-Stokkem	Boyen 16	51.03389°N 5.75340°E	71572 Info	
elongated farm ^{(nl)} ^{(fr)}			Dilsen-Stokkem	Boyen 32	51.03505°N 5.75505°E	71573 Info	
Farmhouse with separate components ^{(nl)} ^{(fr)}			Dilsen-Stokkem	Boyen 46	51.03361°N 5.75427°E	71574 Info	
Cross Barn ^{(nl)} ^{(fr)}			Dilsen-Stokkem	Gallestraat 1B	51.02155°N 5.74570°E	71575 Info	
Former cross barn now houses two recent ^{(nl)} ^{(fr)}			Dilsen-Stokkem	Gallestraat 1	51.02158°N 5.74548°E	71576 Info	
Building Service ^{(nl)} ^{(fr)}	Yes		Dilsen-Stokkem	Kasteelstraat	51.02077°N 5.74592°E	71577 Info	
House ^{(nl)} ^{(fr)}			Dilsen-Stokkem	Kasteelstraat 2	51.02091°N 5.74618°E	71578 Info	
House ^{(nl)} ^{(fr)}			Dilsen-Stokkem	Kasteelstraat 5	51.02065°N 5.74623°E	71579 Info	
Burger House of the double house type ^{(nl)} ^{(fr)}			Dilsen-Stokkem	Kasteelstraat 6	51.02079°N 5.74642°E	71580 Info	
City Farm ^{(nl)}			Dilsen-Stokkem	Kasteelstraat 8	51.02080°N 5.74650°E	71581 Info	
House ^{(nl)}			Dilsen-Stokkem	Kiekenstraat 7	51.02158°N 5.74759°E	71582 Info	
U-shaped city farm ^{(nl)} ^{(fr)}			Dilsen-Stokkem	Maasstraat 12	51.02287°N 5.74527°E	71583 Info	
U-shaped city farm ^{(nl)} ^{(fr)}			Dilsen-Stokkem	Maasstraat 14	51.02287°N 5.74527°E	71583 Info	
double house type ^{(nl)} ^{(fr)}			Dilsen-Stokkem	Maasstraat 17	51.02292°N 5.74612°E	71584 Info	
House ^{(nl)}			Dilsen-Stokkem	Maasstraat 41	51.02339°N 5.74513°E	71585 Info	
House ^{(nl)}			Dilsen-Stokkem	Maasstraat 43	51.02339°N 5.74513°E	71585 Info	
Building arose from the merger of three buildings ^{(nl)} ^{(fr)}			Dilsen-Stokkem	Medaerstraat 21	51.02217°N 5.74863°E	71586 Info	
House ^{(nl)} ^{(fr)}			Dilsen-Stokkem	Medaerstraat 23	51.02208°N 5.74876°E	71587 Info	
elongated farm ^{(nl)} ^{(fr)}			Dilsen-Stokkem	Molenveld 100	51.01162°N 5.76547°E	71588 Info	
elongated farm ^{(nl)} ^{(fr)}			Dilsen-Stokkem	Molenveld 33	51.01636°N 5.75531°E	71589 Info	
L-shaped farmhouse ^{(nl)} ^{(fr)}			Dilsen-Stokkem	Molenveld 36	51.01736°N 5.75393°E	71590 Info	
elongated farm ^{(nl)} ^{(fr)}			Dilsen-Stokkem	Molenveld 74	51.01666°N 5.75700°E	71591 Info	
Skipper Inn ^{(nl)} ^{(fr)}			Dilsen-Stokkem	Oude-Maasstraat 3	51.02140°N 5.74960°E	71592 Info	
House ^{(nl)}			Dilsen-Stokkem	Oude-Maasstraat 5	51.02119°N 5.74967°E	71593 Info	
Town hall ^{(nl)} ^{(fr)}	Yes		Dilsen-Stokkem	Rechtestraat 7	51.02044°N 5.74570°E	71594 Info	
Corner ^{(nl)} ^{(fr)}			Dilsen-Stokkem	Rechtestraat 1	51.02025°N 5.74568°E	71595 Info	
House ^{(nl)} ^{(fr)}			Dilsen-Stokkem	Rechtestraat 4	51.02052°N 5.74527°E	71596 Info	
House ^{(nl)} ^{(fr)}			Dilsen-Stokkem	Rechtestraat 12	51.02057°N 5.74531°E	71597 Info	
Former brewery Nelis ^{(nl)} ^{(fr)}			Dilsen-Stokkem	Rechtestraat 14	51.02082°N 5.74542°E	71598 Info	
House ^{(nl)} ^{(fr)}	Yes		Dilsen-Stokkem	Rechtestraat 19	51.02114°N 5.74608°E	71599 Info	
House ^{(nl)} ^{(fr)}			Dilsen-Stokkem	Rechtestraat 24	51.02124°N 5.74540°E	71600 Info	
Farm ^{(nl)} ^{(fr)}			Dilsen-Stokkem	Rechtestraat 38A	51.02178°N 5.74616°E	71601 Info	
Farm ^{(nl)} ^{(fr)}			Dilsen-Stokkem	Rechtestraat 40	51.02178°N 5.74616°E	71601 Info	
Former drossaard home ^{(nl)} ^{(fr)}	Yes		Dilsen-Stokkem	Rechtestraat 42	51.02191°N 5.74622°E	71602 Info	
Brewery Theunissen ^{(nl)} ^{(fr)}			Dilsen-Stokkem	Rechtestraat 50	51.02226°N 5.74664°E	71603 Info	
House ^{(nl)} ^{(fr)}			Dilsen-Stokkem	Rechtestraat 53	51.02215°N 5.74682°E	71604 Info	
"Huis Briers" ^{(nl)}	Yes		Dilsen-Stokkem	Rechtestraat 55	51.02216°N 5.74723°E	71605 Info	
"Huis Briers" ^{(nl)}	Yes		Dilsen-Stokkem	Rechtestraat 57	51.02216°N 5.74723°E	71605 Info	
Former convent and school of the Little Sisters of St. Joseph ^{(nl)} ^{(fr)}			Dilsen-Stokkem	Schuttersstraat 7	51.01954°N 5.74485°E	71606 Info	
Rectory ^{(nl)} ^{(fr)}			Dilsen-Stokkem	Schuttersstraat 8	51.01968°N 5.74564°E	71607 Info	
service buildings of the weaving company "korverij" ^{(nl)}	Yes		Dilsen-Stokkem	Snapstraat	51.02094°N 5.74663°E	71608 Info	
Two transverse barns ^{(nl)}			Dilsen-Stokkem	Snapstraat	51.02148°N 5.74693°E	71610 Info	
Farmhouse with separate components ^{(nl)} ^{(fr)}			Dilsen-Stokkem	Steenhuis 29	51.02426°N 5.73480°E	71611 Info	
St. Elizabeth Parish ^{(nl)}	Yes		Dilsen-Stokkem	Steenkuilstraat 48	51.02055°N 5.74487°E	71612 Info	
Originally a residential house ^{(nl)} ^{(fr)}			Dilsen-Stokkem	Steenkuilstraat 7	51.02016°N 5.74301°E	71613 Info	
Originally a residential house ^{(nl)} ^{(fr)}			Dilsen-Stokkem	Steenkuilstraat 9	51.02016°N 5.74301°E	71613 Info	
"Het Poorthof" ^{(nl)}	Yes		Dilsen-Stokkem	Steenkuilstraat 14	51.02058°N 5.74272°E	71614 Info	
House ^{(nl)} ^{(fr)}			Dilsen-Stokkem	Steenkuilstraat 19	51.02027°N 5.74334°E	71615 Info	
Notary's property ^{(nl)}			Dilsen-Stokkem	Steenkuilstraat 23	51.02025°N 5.74359°E	71617 Info	
House ^{(nl)} ^{(fr)}			Dilsen-Stokkem	Steenkuilstraat 25	51.02024°N 5.74371°E	71618 Info	
chaplain's residence ^{(nl)}			Dilsen-Stokkem	Steenkuilstraat 39	51.02006°N 5.74427°E	71619 Info	
House ^{(nl)} ^{(fr)}			Dilsen-Stokkem	Steenkuilstraat 45	51.02011°N 5.74456°E	71621 Info	
"A la tête du pierre" ^{(nl)}			Dilsen-Stokkem	Steenkuilstraat 64	51.02020°N 5.74624°E	71622 Info	
"Gruytershuis" ^{(nl)}			Dilsen-Stokkem	Steenkuilstraat 66	51.02015°N 5.74657°E	71623 Info	
Castle Carolinaberg ^{(nl)}	Yes		Dilsen-Stokkem	Steenkuilstraat 70	51.02072°N 5.74923°E	71624 Info	
Chapel Virgin of the Poor ^{(nl)} ^{(fr)}			Dilsen-Stokkem	Hoogbaan	51.04134°N 5.73069°E	86046 Info	
Farm De Licht ^{(nl)}	Yes		Dilsen-Stokkem	Kantonsweg 8	51.03905°N 5.71647°E	86047 Info	
Farm De Licht ^{(nl)}	Yes		Dilsen-Stokkem	Kantonsweg 10	51.03905°N 5.71647°E	86047 Info	
Farm De Licht ^{(nl)}	Yes		Dilsen-Stokkem	Kantonsweg 12	51.03905°N 5.71647°E	86047 Info	
Farm De Licht ^{(nl)}	Yes		Dilsen-Stokkem	Kantonsweg 14	51.03905°N 5.71647°E	86047 Info	
elongated farm ^{(nl)} ^{(fr)}			Dilsen-Stokkem	Kantonsweg 39	51.04142°N 5.71927°E	86048 Info	
Memorial W.W. I ^{(nl)}			Dilsen-Stokkem	Rijksweg	51.03598°N 5.72895°E	86049 Info	
Detached house ^{(nl)} ^{(fr)}			Dilsen-Stokkem	Rijksweg 341	51.02736°N 5.72776°E	86050 Info	
Detached house ^{(nl)} ^{(fr)}			Dilsen-Stokkem	Rijksweg 433	51.03449°N 5.72913°E	86051 Info	
Former school house ^{(nl)} ^{(fr)}			Dilsen-Stokkem	Rijksweg 456	51.03499°N 5.72863°E	86052 Info	
"Oude God", recent cross ^{(nl)}			Dilsen-Stokkem	Stokkemerbaan	51.03214°N 5.73278°E	86053 Info	
"Leemveldhoeve" or "Hof ter Leemveld" ^{(nl)}	Yes		Dilsen-Stokkem	Stokkemerbaan 12	51.03734°N 5.73198°E	86054 Info	
Detached house ^{(nl)} ^{(fr)}			Dilsen-Stokkem	Rijksweg 899	51.06747°N 5.75200°E	86055 Info	
Detached house ^{(nl)} ^{(fr)}			Dilsen-Stokkem	Rijksweg 905	51.06775°N 5.75291°E	86056 Info	
Two similar houses ^{(nl)} ^{(fr)}			Dilsen-Stokkem	Rijksweg 968	51.07662°N 5.75727°E	86057 Info	
Two similar houses ^{(nl)} ^{(fr)}			Dilsen-Stokkem	Rijksweg 970	51.07662°N 5.75727°E	86057 Info	
elongated farm from the 19th century ^{(nl)} ^{(fr)}			Dilsen-Stokkem	Zonnestraat 13	51.06399°N 5.75188°E	86058 Info	
The chapel and the "Kapelhof" ^{(nl)} ^{(fr)}	Yes		Dilsen-Stokkem	Zonnestraat	51.06310°N 5.75580°E	86059 Info	
The chapel and the "Kapelhof" ^{(nl)} ^{(fr)}	Yes		Dilsen-Stokkem	Zonnestraat 39	51.06310°N 5.75580°E	86059 Info	
Villa ^{(nl)} ^{(fr)}	Yes		Dilsen-Stokkem	Tivoli 3	51.01976°N 5.71825°E	86062 Info	
Villa "Les Bruyeres" ^{(nl)} ^{(fr)}	Yes		Dilsen-Stokkem	Tivoli 5	51.01975°N 5.71775°E	86063 Info	
Home of a farm ^{(nl)} ^{(fr)}			Dilsen-Stokkem	Eindestraat 22	51.05192°N 5.72848°E	86064 Info	
elongated farm ^{(nl)} ^{(fr)}			Dilsen-Stokkem	Eindestraat 78	51.05171°N 5.71227°E	86065 Info	
L-shaped farmhouse ^{(nl)} ^{(fr)}			Dilsen-Stokkem	Emiel Dorlaan 33	51.05404°N 5.72619°E	86066 Info	
Memorial to the casualties of W.W. I ^{(nl)} ^{(fr)}			Dilsen-Stokkem	Haagstraat	51.05220°N 5.73763°E	86067 Info	
Cast iron pump with basin ^{(nl)} ^{(fr)}	Yes		Dilsen-Stokkem	Haagstraat	51.05206°N 5.73764°E	86068 Info	
village house ^{(nl)} ^{(fr)}			Dilsen-Stokkem	Hoogbaan 154	51.05460°N 5.73947°E	86070 Info	
elongated farm ^{(nl)} ^{(fr)}			Dilsen-Stokkem	Hoogbaan 173	51.05327°N 5.73893°E	86071 Info	
elongated farm ^{(nl)} ^{(fr)}			Dilsen-Stokkem	Hoogbaan 175	51.05349°N 5.73910°E	86072 Info	
former farm ^{(nl)} ^{(fr)}			Dilsen-Stokkem	Hoogbaan 183	51.05420°N 5.73959°E	86073 Info	
Farmhouse with separate components ^{(nl)} ^{(fr)}			Dilsen-Stokkem	Hoogbaan 205	51.05589°N 5.74082°E	86074 Info	
farm "Rubensgoed" ^{(nl)}			Dilsen-Stokkem	Kantonsweg 214	51.05928°N 5.70832°E	86075 Info	
War Memorial of W.W. I ^{(nl)} ^{(fr)}			Dilsen-Stokkem	Steenkuilstraat	51.02039°N 5.74497°E	86076 Info	
Reconstruction of the foundations of St. John's Chapel of Mulheim ^{(nl)} ^{(fr)}			Dilsen-Stokkem	Mulheim	51.00500°N 5.71431°E	86212 Info	
Small village house ^{(nl)} ^{(fr)}			Dilsen-Stokkem	Haagstraat 50A	51.05240°N 5.73146°E	86221 Info	
double house type ^{(nl)} ^{(fr)}			Dilsen-Stokkem	Stokkemerbaan 45	51.03496°N 5.73320°E	88650 Info	
Contiguous row houses ^{(nl)} ^{(fr)}			Dilsen-Stokkem	Stokkemerbaan 47	51.03453°N 5.73338°E	88651 Info	
Contiguous row houses ^{(nl)} ^{(fr)}			Dilsen-Stokkem	Stokkemerbaan 49	51.03453°N 5.73338°E	88651 Info	
Contiguous row houses ^{(nl)} ^{(fr)}			Dilsen-Stokkem	Stokkemerbaan 51	51.03453°N 5.73338°E	88651 Info	
"Hof Termotten", farm with loose components ^{(nl)}	Yes		Dilsen-Stokkem	Stokkemerbaan 58	51.03310°N 5.73269°E	88652 Info	
Two houses mirror ^{(nl)}			Dilsen-Stokkem	Rijksweg 102	51.01225°N 5.72498°E	88653 Info	
Two houses mirror ^{(nl)}			Dilsen-Stokkem	Rijksweg 104	51.01225°N 5.72498°E	88653 Info	
Former mill fire ^{(nl)}			Dilsen-Stokkem	Rijksweg 106	51.01255°N 5.72497°E	88654 Info	
Burger House ^{(nl)}			Dilsen-Stokkem	Rijksweg 217	51.01752°N 5.72671°E	88655 Info	
the wall alongside the "Stadsgraaf" ^{(nl)}	Yes		Dilsen-Stokkem	Senator G. Ruttenstraat	51.02212°N 5.74302°E	200336 Info	
the wall alongside the "Stadsgraaf" ^{(nl)}	Yes		Dilsen-Stokkem	Wal	51.02212°N 5.74302°E	200336 Info	
Wal along Tugelaplein ^{(nl)} ^{(fr)}	Yes		Dilsen-Stokkem	Steenkuilstraat	51.01949°N 5.74606°E	200338 Info	
earthwork embankment ^{(nl)} ^{(fr)}	Yes		Dilsen-Stokkem	Wal	51.02131°N 5.74861°E	200339 Info	

== See also ==
- List of onroerend erfgoed in Limburg (Belgium)
- Dilsen-Stokkem
