= Stettlen =

- Municipality
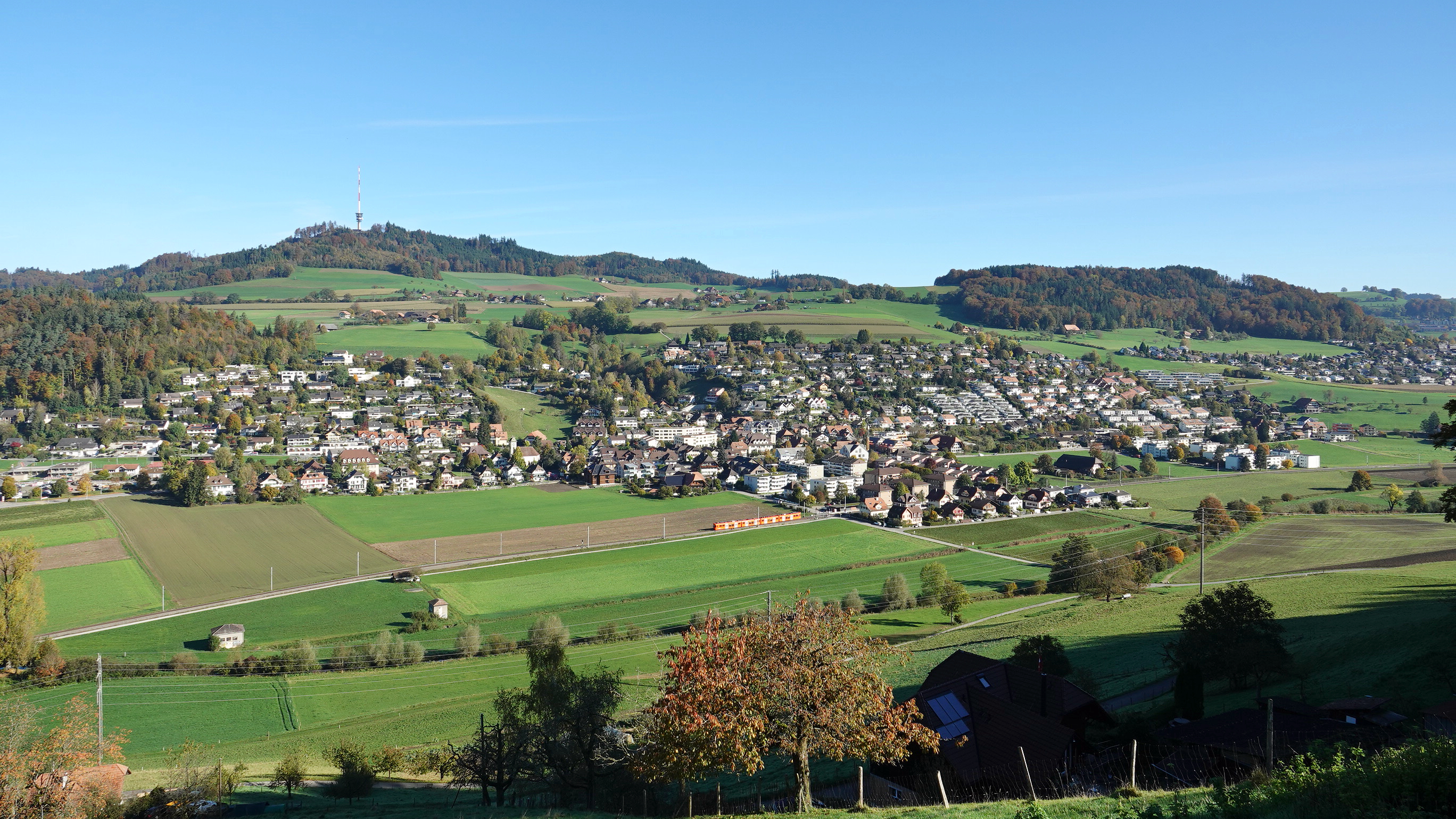

- Flag Coat of arms
- Location of Stettlen
- Location within Switzerland Location within Canton of Bern
- Coordinates: 46°58′N 7°31′E
- Country: Switzerland
- Canton: Bern
- District: Bern-Mittelland

Government
  - Executive: Gemeinderat with 7 members
  - Mayor: Gemeindepräsident(in); Christian Kaderli GLP (as of 2026)

Area
  - Total: 3.50 km^{2} (1.35 sq mi)
- Elevation: 570 m (1,870 ft)

Population (December 2020)
  - Total: 3,162
  - Density: 903/km^{2} (2,340/sq mi)
- Time zone: UTC+01:00 (CET)
  - Summer (DST): UTC+02:00 (CEST)
- Postal code: 3066
- SFOS number: 358
- ISO 3166 code: CH-BE
- Localities: Deisswil, Stettlen
- Surrounded by: Bolligen, Muri bei Bern, Ostermundigen, Vechigen
- Website: www.stettlen.ch

Stettlen is a municipality in the Bern-Mittelland administrative district in the canton of Bern in Switzerland.

== History ==
Stettlen is first mentioned in 1146 as Stetelon.

Archeological excavations have found evidence of several prehistoric settlements in the Stettlen area. The earliest is several La Tène era graves which contain skeletons and some items of jewelry from near the modern Bleichestrasse. Traces of a Roman era settlement were found at Deisswil. During the High Middle Ages there was a small castle at Schwandiholz, of which no records remain.

Stettlen was the smallest of the four parishes on the city of Bern. After 1300, it was considered part of the extended city and until 1798 residents of Stettlen were considered citizens of Bern.

The village church of St. Blaise was first built in the 9th century. It was rebuilt during the 12th century and rebuilt again around 1400. No records remain of the first two churches but the foundations have been archeologically explored. The current church was built in 1729-30.

The village of Stettlen was the center of a number of small farms and the hamlet of Deisswil. By 1810, Stettlen had 295 residents, Deisswil had 88 inhabitants and the scattered farms along the Utzlenberg collectively had 223 inhabitants. From 1700 until 1720 a Bernese patrician family built the Deisswilgut manor and mill in Stettlen. The area upstream from Deisswilgut became known as Upper Deisswilgut. Starting in 1757 Upper Deisswilgut became home to fulling, bleaching and dyeing plants that were built along the Worblen river. In 1846, a Federal blasting cap factory was built along the Worblen. This was followed in 1876 by the businessman Jorg Ulrich's cardboard factory. Initially the cardboard was produced with water power, which was replaced by steam power and by 1900 electricity. In 1913 the cardboard factory was connected to the Bern-Worb railroad. Low cost transportation helped make the Karton Deisswil AG factory into the largest cardboard factory in Switzerland. The factory was bought out in 1990 by the Austrian Mayr-Melnhof Group and then resold in 2010 to the Bernese Industrie AG investor group who are trying to establish a large industrial park.

The local factories and good connections to Bern converted the village from agriculture into a typical suburban community. Housing estates and apartment buildings began to replace farms starting in the 1950s. In 1949 there were 49 farms in the area, by 2003 it was down to only eleven. Stettlen has two school buildings (built in 1930 and 1968) for the primary school and secondary school.

== Geography ==
Stettlen has an area of 3.5 km^{2} (1.35 sq mi). Of this area, 1.81 km^{2} (0.70 mi^{2}) or 51.4% is used for agricultural purposes, while 0.94 km^{2} (0.36 mi^{2}) or 26.7% is forested. Of the rest of the land, 0.79 km^{2} (0.31 mi^{2}) or 22.4% is settled (buildings or roads), 0.01 km^{2} (2.5 acres) or 0.3% is either rivers or lakes.

Of the built up area, industrial buildings made up 2.0% of the total area while housing and buildings made up 13.1% and transportation infrastructure made up 5.7%. while parks, green belts and sports fields made up 1.7%. Out of the forested land, all of the forested land area is covered with heavy forests. Of the agricultural land, 30.7% is used for growing crops and 17.6% is pastures, while 3.1% is used for orchards or vine crops. All the water in the municipality is flowing water.

The municipality is located between the Bantiger and Dentenberg mountains in the Worblen valley. It is part of the agglomeration of Bern. It consists of the village of Stettlen, the industrial park of Deisswil and the hamlet of Utzlenberg.

On 31 December 2009 Amtsbezirk Bern, the municipality's former district, was dissolved. On the following day, 1 January 2010, it joined the newly created Verwaltungskreis Bern-Mittelland.

== Coat of arms ==
The blazon of the municipal coat of arms is Or a Ploughshare Gules.

== Demographics ==
Stettlen has a population (as of December 2020) of 3,162. As of 2010, 10.2% of the population are resident foreign nationals. Over the last 10 years (2000-2010) the population has changed at a rate of 3%. Migration accounted for 2%, while births and deaths accounted for 3.3%.

Most of the population (as of 2000) speaks German (2,609 or 92.1%) as their first language, French is the second most common (50 or 1.8%) and Italian is the third (43 or 1.5%). There are 3 people who speak Romansh.

As of 2008, the population was 48.9% male and 51.1% female. The population was made up of 1,271 Swiss men (43.7% of the population) and 150 (5.2%) non-Swiss men. There were 1,341 Swiss women (46.1%) and 146 (5.0%) non-Swiss women. Of the population in the municipality, 522 or about 18.4% were born in Stettlen and lived there in 2000. There were 1,373 or 48.5% who were born in the same canton, while 534 or 18.8% were born somewhere else in Switzerland, and 314 or 11.1% were born outside of Switzerland.

As of 2010, children and teenagers (0–19 years old) make up 19.9% of the population, while adults (20–64 years old) make up 62.7% and seniors (over 64 years old) make up 17.4%.

As of 2000, there were 1,178 people who were single and never married in the municipality. There were 1,407 married individuals, 119 widows or widowers and 129 individuals who are divorced.

As of 2000, there were 326 households that consist of only one person and 74 households with five or more people. In 2000, a total of 1,136 apartments (93.8% of the total) were permanently occupied, while 54 apartments (4.5%) were seasonally occupied and 21 apartments (1.7%) were empty. As of 2010, the construction rate of new housing units was 2.8 new units per 1000 residents. The vacancy rate for the municipality, in 2011, was 3.99%.

The historical population is given in the following chart:

== Politics ==
In the 2011 federal election the most popular party was the BDP Party which received 24.5% of the vote. The next three most popular parties were the SVP (20.3%), the SPS (17.3%) and the FDP (13.5%). In the federal election, a total of 1,284 votes were cast, and the voter turnout was 59.0%.

== Economy ==
As of 2011, Stettlen had an unemployment rate of 2.02%. As of 2008, there were a total of 737 people employed in the municipality. Of these, there were 22 people employed in the primary economic sector and about 10 businesses involved in this sector. 461 people were employed in the secondary sector and there were 20 businesses in this sector. 254 people were employed in the tertiary sector, with 47 businesses in this sector.

In 2008 there were a total of 638 full-time equivalent jobs. The number of jobs in the primary sector was 14, all of which were in agriculture. The number of jobs in the secondary sector was 440 of which 319 or (72.5%) were in manufacturing and 121 (27.5%) were in construction. The number of jobs in the tertiary sector was 184. In the tertiary sector; 36 or 19.6% were in wholesale or retail sales or the repair of motor vehicles, 10 or 5.4% were in the movement and storage of goods, 29 or 15.8% were in a hotel or restaurant, 11 or 6.0% were in the information industry, 13 or 7.1% were technical professionals or scientists, 27 or 14.7% were in education and 27 or 14.7% were in health care.

In 2000, there were 511 workers who commuted into the municipality and 1,296 workers who commuted away. The municipality is a net exporter of workers, with about 2.5 workers leaving the municipality for every one entering. Of the working population, 36.2% used public transportation to get to work, and 43.9% used a private car.

== Religion ==
From the 2000 census, 417 or 14.7% were Roman Catholic, while 1,939 or 68.4% belonged to the Swiss Reformed Church. Of the rest of the population, there were 10 members of an Orthodox church (or about 0.35% of the population), there were 4 individuals (or about 0.14% of the population) who belonged to the Christian Catholic Church, and there were 136 individuals (or about 4.80% of the population) who belonged to another Christian church. There were 2 individuals (or about 0.07% of the population) who were Jewish, and 76 (or about 2.68% of the population) who were Islamic. There were 8 individuals who were Buddhist and 15 individuals who were Hindu. 213 (or about 7.52% of the population) belonged to no church, are agnostic or atheist, and 75 individuals (or about 2.65% of the population) did not answer the question.

== Education ==
In Stettlen about 1,234 or (43.6%) of the population have completed non-mandatory upper secondary education, and 499 or (17.6%) have completed additional higher education (either university or a Fachhochschule). Of the 499 who completed tertiary schooling, 70.3% were Swiss men, 21.8% were Swiss women, 5.0% were non-Swiss men and 2.8% were non-Swiss women.

The Canton of Bern school system provides one year of non-obligatory Kindergarten, followed by six years of Primary school. This is followed by three years of obligatory lower Secondary school where the students are separated according to ability and aptitude. Following the lower Secondary students may attend additional schooling or they may enter an apprenticeship.

During the 2009-10 school year, there were a total of 265 students attending classes in Stettlen. There were 3 kindergarten classes with a total of 48 students in the municipality. Of the kindergarten students, 8.3% were permanent or temporary residents of Switzerland (not citizens) and 10.4% have a different mother language than the classroom language. The municipality had 9 primary classes and 160 students. Of the primary students, 10.0% were permanent or temporary residents of Switzerland (not citizens) and 13.8% have a different mother language than the classroom language. During the same year, there were 3 lower secondary classes with a total of 57 students. There were 8.8% who were permanent or temporary residents of Switzerland (not citizens) and 14.0% have a different mother language than the classroom language.

As of 2000, there were 14 students in Stettlen who came from another municipality, while 163 residents attended schools outside the municipality.

== Notable residents ==
- Tamy Glauser (born 1985), Swiss model and LGBT rights activist
