= Zoé Metthez =

Swiss model (born 1994)

- Born: Zoé Metthez; 12 December 1994 (age 31); Bern, Switzerland
- Height: 1.79 m (5 ft 10 1/2 in)
- Beauty pageant titleholder
- Title: Miss Universe Switzerland 2014
- Hair color: Brown
- Eye color: Brown
- Major competitions: Miss Neuchâtel 2013 (runner-up); Miss Universe 2014 (Unplaced)

Zoé Metthez (born 12 December 1994) is a Swiss model and beauty pageant titleholder who was crowned Miss Universe Switzerland 2014 and represented Switzerland at the Miss Universe 2014.

== Early life ==
Zoé holds a commercial diploma from the Jean Piaget École Supérieur de Commerce in Neuchâtel.

== Pageantry ==
=== Miss Neuchâtel 2013 ===
Zoé was elected runner-up at Miss Neuchâtel 2013.

=== Miss Schweiz 2014 ===
On 17 August 2014 Metthez was elected as Miss Universe Switzerland 2014.

=== Miss Universe 2014 ===
Zoé competed at Miss Universe 2014 pageant but unplaced.

Awards and achievements
Preceded by Dominique Rinderknecht	Miss Switzerland; 2014	Succeeded by Dijana Cvijetic
