= Anjum Mumtaz Barg =

Simple man

Anjum Mumtaz Baig
- Born: 1954 (age 71–72); Hyderabad, Andhra Pradesh, India
- Height: 1.62 m (5 ft 4 in)
- Beauty pageant titleholder
- Title: Femina Miss India Universe 1968; Femina Miss India World 1968
- Hair color: Black
- Eye color: Black
- Major competitions: Femina Miss India 1968 (Winner); Miss Universe 1968 (Unplaced)

Anjum Mumtaz Baig is the winner of Femina Miss India 1968. She came from Hyderabad, India. She married and moved to the United States.
