= Margine Davidson =

Nicaraguan beauty pageant titleholder

Margine Davidson Morales (born c. 1948) is a Nicaraguan beauty queen who represented her country at Miss Universe 1968 and Miss World 1968. She placed in the Top 6 at Miss World 1968.

== Pageantry ==
=== Miss Nicaragua 1968 ===
Davidson competed in the Miss Nicaragua 1968 pageant at Club Internacional in March 1968. She was crowned Miss Nicaragua 1968 on May 17, 1968.

=== Miss Universe 1968 ===
As Miss Nicaragua, Davidson competed at Miss Universe 1968 in Miami Beach, Florida, but did not place among the semi-finalists.

=== Miss World 1968 ===
Davidson represented Nicaragua at Miss World 1968 held on November 14, 1968, at the Lyceum Ballroom in London. She placed in the Top 7.

Awards and achievements
Preceded by Leda Sánchez	Miss Nicaragua; 1968	Succeeded by Soraya Herrera
Preceded by Sandra Correa	Miss World Nicaragua; 1968	Succeeded by Carlota Brenes
