= List of protected heritage sites in Dilsen-Stokkem (part 1) =

This table shows an overview of the protected heritage sites in the Flemish town Dilsen-Stokkem. This list is part of Belgium's national heritage.

Object	Status^{?}	Year/architect	Town/section	Address	Coordinates	Number^{?}	Image
Chapel of Our Lady of Assistance ^{(nl)} ^{(fr)}			Dilsen-Stokkem	Bloemendaal	51.03357°N 5.72947°E	71120 Info	
"Driepaalhoeve" ^{(nl)}			Dilsen-Stokkem	Driepaal 3	51.03567°N 5.66682°E	71121 Info	
Farm ^{(nl)} ^{(fr)}			Dilsen-Stokkem	Driepaalhoeveweg 1	51.03581°N 5.70330°E	71122 Info	
St. Martin Parish ^{(nl)} ^{(fr)}	Yes		Dilsen-Stokkem	Europalaan	51.03756°N 5.72274°E	71123 Info	
Castle Ter Motten ^{(nl)}	Yes		Dilsen-Stokkem	Europalaan 25	51.03706°N 5.72571°E	71124 Info	
White Chapel ^{(nl)} ^{(fr)}			Dilsen-Stokkem	Europalaan	51.03863°N 5.71674°E	71125 Info	
Former farm ^{(nl)} ^{(fr)}			Dilsen-Stokkem	Europalaan 60	51.03703°N 5.72318°E	71126 Info	
Rectory ^{(nl)} ^{(fr)}			Dilsen-Stokkem	Europalaan 65	51.03807°N 5.72237°E	71127 Info	
Property from the interwar period ^{(nl)}	Yes		Dilsen-Stokkem	Europalaan 67	51.03798°N 5.72202°E	71128 Info	
Former Farm ^{(nl)} ^{(fr)}			Dilsen-Stokkem	Europalaan 75	51.03784°N 5.72107°E	71129 Info	
Elongated brick building ^{(nl)} ^{(fr)}			Dilsen-Stokkem	Europalaan 80	51.03757°N 5.72079°E	71130 Info	
"De Lente" ^{(nl)}			Dilsen-Stokkem	Europalaan 104	51.03789°N 5.71855°E	71131 Info	
elongated farm ^{(nl)} ^{(fr)}			Dilsen-Stokkem	Europalaan 130	51.03821°N 5.71543°E	71132 Info	
L-shaped farmhouse ^{(nl)} ^{(fr)}			Dilsen-Stokkem	Europalaan 144	51.03836°N 5.71353°E	71133 Info	
elongated farm ^{(nl)} ^{(fr)}			Dilsen-Stokkem	Europalaan 149	51.03919°N 5.71140°E	71134 Info	
Windmill from 1871 ^{(nl)} ^{(fr)}	Yes		Dilsen-Stokkem	Heilderveld	51.03939°N 5.72514°E	71135 Info	
elongated farm ^{(nl)} ^{(fr)}			Dilsen-Stokkem	Kruishoefstraat 2	51.04081°N 5.70305°E	71136 Info	
L-shaped farmhouse ^{(nl)} ^{(fr)}			Dilsen-Stokkem	M. Stansstraat 4	51.03570°N 5.73506°E	71137 Info	
Tower of the old St Martin's ^{(nl)} ^{(fr)}	Yes		Dilsen-Stokkem	Oude-Kerkstraat	51.03364°N 5.73579°E	71138 Info	
Former farm ^{(nl)} ^{(fr)}			Dilsen-Stokkem	Oude-Kerkstraat 8	51.03533°N 5.73131°E	71139 Info	
Former farmhouse XIXB ^{(nl)} ^{(fr)}			Dilsen-Stokkem	Oude-Kerkstraat 31	51.03540°N 5.73415°E	71140 Info	
Former presbytery ^{(nl)} ^{(fr)}	Yes		Dilsen-Stokkem	Oude-Kerkstraat 53	51.03372°N 5.73550°E	71141 Info	
Former brewery steam Saint Joseph ^{(nl)} ^{(fr)}	Yes		Dilsen-Stokkem	Oude-Kerkstraat 55	51.03299°N 5.73498°E	71142 Info	
Farm of 1904 ^{(nl)} ^{(fr)}			Dilsen-Stokkem	Pannenhuisstraat 18	51.03886°N 5.69907°E	71143 Info	
Two farmhouses ^{(nl)}			Dilsen-Stokkem	Ritserstraat 2	51.04348°N 5.72633°E	71144 Info	
Two farmhouses ^{(nl)}			Dilsen-Stokkem	Ritserstraat 4	51.04348°N 5.72633°E	71144 Info	
Two farmhouses ^{(nl)}			Dilsen-Stokkem	Ritserstraat 6	51.04348°N 5.72633°E	71144 Info	
Two farmhouses ^{(nl)}			Dilsen-Stokkem	Ritserstraat 8	51.04348°N 5.72633°E	71144 Info	
Farm with old core ^{(nl)} ^{(fr)}			Dilsen-Stokkem	Ritserstraat 34	51.04473°N 5.72029°E	71145 Info	
Parish Center ^{(nl)} ^{(fr)}			Dilsen-Stokkem	Schoolstraat 25	51.03587°N 5.72229°E	71146 Info	
Former farm ^{(nl)} ^{(fr)}			Dilsen-Stokkem	Schoolstraat 100	51.03793°N 5.71350°E	71147 Info	
Former farm ^{(nl)} ^{(fr)}			Dilsen-Stokkem	Vissersstraat 3	51.03304°N 5.73688°E	71148 Info	
Star restored building ^{(nl)} ^{(fr)}			Dilsen-Stokkem	Vissersstraat 6	51.03356°N 5.73683°E	71149 Info	
House of approx 1935 ^{(nl)} ^{(fr)}			Dilsen-Stokkem	Vlessersweg 22	51.03573°N 5.72095°E	71150 Info	
House of approx 1935 ^{(nl)} ^{(fr)}			Dilsen-Stokkem	Vlessersweg 34	51.03468°N 5.72051°E	71151 Info	
Former kapelanie ^{(nl)} ^{(fr)}	Yes		Dilsen-Stokkem	Vissersstraat 2	51.03340°N 5.73662°E	71152 Info	
"Hooghuis" ^{(nl)}	Yes		Dilsen-Stokkem	Watermolenstraat 19	51.03149°N 5.73709°E	71153 Info	
Bipartisan farm ^{(nl)} ^{(fr)}			Dilsen-Stokkem	Watermolenstraat 20	51.03192°N 5.73619°E	71154 Info	
elongated farm ^{(nl)} ^{(fr)}	Yes		Dilsen-Stokkem	Bergerkampstraat 1	51.06584°N 5.76010°E	71340 Info	
Home of a farm ^{(nl)} ^{(fr)}			Dilsen-Stokkem	Bergerkampstraat 4	51.06539°N 5.76023°E	71341 Info	
Former farm ^{(nl)} ^{(fr)}	Yes		Dilsen-Stokkem	Bergerkampstraat 7	51.06552°N 5.75953°E	71342 Info	
elongated farm ^{(nl)} ^{(fr)}			Dilsen-Stokkem	Bergerkampstraat 10	51.06486°N 5.75956°E	71343 Info	
Small farm from the 19th century ^{(nl)} ^{(fr)}	Yes		Dilsen-Stokkem	Bergerkampstraat 14	51.06532°N 5.75911°E	71344 Info	
Former brewery ^{(nl)} ^{(fr)}			Dilsen-Stokkem	Bergerkampstraat 15	51.06551°N 5.75753°E	71345 Info	
Former brewery ^{(nl)} ^{(fr)}			Dilsen-Stokkem	Bergerkampstraat 17	51.06551°N 5.75753°E	71345 Info	
"In de goude ster" ^{(nl)}	Yes		Dilsen-Stokkem	Bergerkampstraat 16	51.06522°N 5.75887°E	71346 Info	
"Het Lemke" ^{(nl)}	Yes		Dilsen-Stokkem	Bergerkampstraat 18	51.06506°N 5.75861°E	71347 Info	
Chapel of Our Lady of Always Durige Assistance ^{(nl)} ^{(fr)}			Dilsen-Stokkem	Langerijnsweg	51.06856°N 5.76333°E	71348 Info	
Farmstead "The Damien" ^{(nl)} ^{(fr)}			Dilsen-Stokkem	Damiaan 11	51.06482°N 5.79633°E	71349 Info	
Farmstead "Zanderhof" ^{(nl)} ^{(fr)}			Dilsen-Stokkem	Keizerskamp 3	51.07540°N 5.76952°E	71350 Info	
Farmstead "Kloosterhof" ^{(nl)} ^{(fr)}			Dilsen-Stokkem	Keizerskamp 2	51.07514°N 5.76735°E	71351 Info	
St. Peter's Parish ^{(nl)} ^{(fr)}	Yes		Dilsen-Stokkem	Kerkstraat 9	51.06573°N 5.75940°E	71352 Info	
House ^{(nl)}			Dilsen-Stokkem	Kerkstraat 1	51.06620°N 5.75932°E	71353 Info	
Former farm ^{(nl)} ^{(fr)}			Dilsen-Stokkem	Kerkstraat 2	51.06633°N 5.75888°E	71354 Info	
Farm of 1851 ^{(nl)} ^{(fr)}			Dilsen-Stokkem	Kerkstraat 4	51.06621°N 5.75872°E	71355 Info	
Former farm ^{(nl)} ^{(fr)}			Dilsen-Stokkem	Kerkstraat 6	51.06602°N 5.75828°E	71356 Info	
House ^{(nl)}	Yes		Dilsen-Stokkem	Kerkstraat 8	51.06558°N 5.75840°E	71357 Info	
Convent school ^{(nl)} ^{(fr)}			Dilsen-Stokkem	Bergerkampstraat 21	51.06551°N 5.75701°E	71368 Info	
Farm ^{(nl)} ^{(fr)}	Yes		Dilsen-Stokkem	Kromstraat 7	51.06758°N 5.75852°E	71369 Info	
Property of 1879 ^{(nl)} ^{(fr)}			Dilsen-Stokkem	Kromstraat 12	51.06814°N 5.75949°E	71370 Info	
Monument W.O. I ^{(nl)} ^{(fr)}			Dilsen-Stokkem	Langstraat	51.06820°N 5.75547°E	71371 Info	
Farm ^{(nl)} ^{(fr)}			Dilsen-Stokkem	Langstraat 8	51.06817°N 5.75281°E	71372 Info	
Homes ^{(nl)} ^{(fr)}			Dilsen-Stokkem	Langstraat 10	51.06824°N 5.75310°E	71373 Info	
Homes ^{(nl)} ^{(fr)}			Dilsen-Stokkem	Langstraat 12	51.06824°N 5.75310°E	71373 Info	
Detached house of approx 1935 ^{(nl)} ^{(fr)}			Dilsen-Stokkem	Langstraat 14	51.06824°N 5.75355°E	71374 Info	
Rest of a farm ^{(nl)} ^{(fr)}			Dilsen-Stokkem	Langstraat 39	51.06634°N 5.75956°E	71375 Info	
Rest of a farm ^{(nl)} ^{(fr)}			Dilsen-Stokkem	Langstraat 41	51.06634°N 5.75956°E	71375 Info	
Detached village house ^{(nl)} ^{(fr)}			Dilsen-Stokkem	Langstraat 43	51.06631°N 5.75966°E	71376 Info	
Small farm ^{(nl)} ^{(fr)}			Dilsen-Stokkem	Langstraat 45	51.06630°N 5.75992°E	71377 Info	
Former cigar factory ^{(nl)} ^{(fr)}	Yes		Dilsen-Stokkem	Langstraat 47	51.06623°N 5.76019°E	71378 Info	
Rectory ^{(nl)} ^{(fr)}	Yes		Dilsen-Stokkem	Langstraat 51	51.06596°N 5.76049°E	71379 Info	
Castle Sipernau ^{(nl)} ^{(fr)}	Yes		Dilsen-Stokkem	Sipernau 2	51.07362°N 5.74683°E	71380 Info	
Castle Sipernau ^{(nl)} ^{(fr)}	Yes		Dilsen-Stokkem	Sipernau 4	51.07362°N 5.74683°E	71380 Info	
Castle Sipernau ^{(nl)} ^{(fr)}	Yes		Dilsen-Stokkem	Sipernau 6	51.07362°N 5.74683°E	71380 Info	
Castle Sipernau ^{(nl)} ^{(fr)}	Yes		Dilsen-Stokkem	Sipernau 8	51.07362°N 5.74683°E	71380 Info	
Castle Sipernau ^{(nl)} ^{(fr)}	Yes		Dilsen-Stokkem	Sipernau 10	51.07362°N 5.74683°E	71380 Info	
Farm of the castle Sipernau ^{(nl)} ^{(fr)}	Yes		Dilsen-Stokkem	Sipernau 2	51.07310°N 5.74708°E	71381 Info	
Dwelling house ^{(nl)} ^{(fr)}			Dilsen-Stokkem	Stationsstraat 7	51.06783°N 5.75063°E	71382 Info	
Rest of a farm ^{(nl)} ^{(fr)}			Dilsen-Stokkem	Stationsstraat 13	51.06766°N 5.74989°E	71383 Info	
The "Luikerhuis in the heather" ^{(nl)} ^{(fr)}	Yes		Dilsen-Stokkem	Watering 1	51.06935°N 5.70617°E	71384 Info	
Farmstead "The Camp" ^{(nl)} ^{(fr)}	Yes		Dilsen-Stokkem	Zandstraat 18	51.06842°N 5.75870°E	71385 Info	
Brick windmill "The Hope" ^{(nl)} ^{(fr)}	Yes		Dilsen-Stokkem	Zandstraat 78	51.07228°N 5.76646°E	71387 Info	
Brick windmill "De Hoop" ^{(nl)} ^{(fr)}	Yes		Dilsen-Stokkem	Zandstraat 80	51.07228°N 5.76646°E	71387 Info	
Former bridge operator house ^{(nl)} ^{(fr)}	Yes		Dilsen-Stokkem	Vliegenheuvel 1	51.02028°N 5.71917°E	71389 Info	
Villa ^{(nl)} ^{(fr)}			Dilsen-Stokkem	Brugwachterskade 3	51.02087°N 5.71891°E	71390 Info	
Wooden cross ^{(nl)} ^{(fr)}			Dilsen-Stokkem	Dorpsstraat	51.01944°N 5.72363°E	71391 Info	
Cross of the Four Field ^{(nl)} ^{(fr)}	Yes		Dilsen-Stokkem	Tivoli	51.01999°N 5.71885°E	71392 Info	
Village house ^{(nl)} ^{(fr)}			Dilsen-Stokkem	Dorpsstraat 2	51.01900°N 5.72884°E	71393 Info	
Farm ^{(nl)} ^{(fr)}			Dilsen-Stokkem	Dorpsstraat 6	51.01882°N 5.72820°E	71394 Info	
Villa ^{(nl)} ^{(fr)}			Dilsen-Stokkem	Dorpsstraat 16	51.01903°N 5.72669°E	71395 Info	
Single residential house ^{(nl)} ^{(fr)}			Dilsen-Stokkem	Dorpsstraat 27	51.01889°N 5.72499°E	71396 Info	
Free Primary School, Convent of the Sisters of Providence and school ^{(nl)} ^{(fr)}			Dilsen-Stokkem	Dorpsstraat 30	51.01999°N 5.72479°E	71397 Info	
Two identical houses mirrored schedule ^{(nl)} ^{(fr)}	Yes		Dilsen-Stokkem	Dorpsstraat 41	51.01920°N 5.72295°E	71398 Info	
Two identical houses mirrored schedule ^{(nl)} ^{(fr)}	Yes		Dilsen-Stokkem	Dorpsstraat 43	51.01920°N 5.72295°E	71398 Info	
Villa Litzberg ^{(nl)} ^{(fr)}			Dilsen-Stokkem	Dorpsstraat 45	51.01923°N 5.72248°E	71399 Info	
House of approx 1935 ^{(nl)} ^{(fr)}			Dilsen-Stokkem	Dorpsstraat 48	51.02009°N 5.72130°E	71400 Info	
Hotel Beau Sejour ^{(nl)} ^{(fr)}	Yes		Dilsen-Stokkem	Dorpsstraat 59	51.01951°N 5.71998°E	71401 Info	
Double House ^{(nl)}	Yes		Dilsen-Stokkem	Dorpsstraat 68	51.02032°N 5.72013°E	71402 Info	
Old cemetery ^{(nl)} ^{(fr)}			Dilsen-Stokkem	Kerkhofstraat	51.01932°N 5.72804°E	71404 Info	
elongated farm ^{(nl)} ^{(fr)}			Dilsen-Stokkem	Kerkhofstraat 1	51.01907°N 5.72711°E	71405 Info	
Former section home and school for boys ^{(nl)} ^{(fr)}	Yes		Dilsen-Stokkem	Kruisstraat 7	51.01789°N 5.72691°E	71406 Info	
village house ^{(nl)} ^{(fr)}			Dilsen-Stokkem	Mulheim 24	51.00489°N 5.71579°E	71409 Info	
elongated farm ^{(nl)} ^{(fr)}			Dilsen-Stokkem	Mulheim 31	51.00372°N 5.71623°E	71410 Info	
St. Paul Parish ^{(nl)} ^{(fr)}			Dilsen-Stokkem	Oude Baan	51.01467°N 5.72098°E	71412 Info	
villa ^{(nl)} ^{(fr)}	Yes		Dilsen-Stokkem	Tivoli 7	51.01972°N 5.71725°E	71414 Info	
Chapel of Our Lady of Lourdes ^{(nl)} ^{(fr)}			Dilsen-Stokkem	de Schiervellaan	51.05253°N 5.74924°E	71510 Info	
cast Iron cross ^{(nl)}			Dilsen-Stokkem	de Schiervellaan	51.05144°N 5.74844°E	71511 Info	
Castle Ommerstein ^{(nl)}	Yes		Dilsen-Stokkem	de Schiervellaan 1	51.04664°N 5.74228°E	71512 Info	
Castle farm Ommerstein ^{(nl)}	Yes		Dilsen-Stokkem	de Schiervellaan 3	51.04674°N 5.74498°E	71513 Info	
Verschuylenhof ^{(nl)}	Yes		Dilsen-Stokkem	de Schiervellaan 5	51.04787°N 5.74715°E	71514 Info	
Meuse-style farm ^{(nl)}			Dilsen-Stokkem	de Schiervellaan 10	51.05070°N 5.74749°E	71515 Info	
farm ^{(nl)} ^{(fr)}			Dilsen-Stokkem	de Schiervellaan 14	51.05119°N 5.74729°E	71516 Info	
U-shaped farm with old core ^{(nl)} ^{(fr)}			Dilsen-Stokkem	de Schiervellaan 25	51.04979°N 5.74760°E	71517 Info	
farm ^{(nl)} ^{(fr)}			Dilsen-Stokkem	de Schiervellaan 27	51.05006°N 5.74781°E	71518 Info	
farm ^{(nl)} ^{(fr)}			Dilsen-Stokkem	de Schiervellaan 34	51.05311°N 5.74941°E	71519 Info	
elongated farm ^{(nl)} ^{(fr)}			Dilsen-Stokkem	Eekhoornlaan 79	51.06452°N 5.71567°E	71526 Info	
Parish and St. Monulphus Gondulfus ^{(nl)} ^{(fr)}			Dilsen-Stokkem	Haagstraat	51.05231°N 5.73757°E	71534 Info	
Teachers Homes and section house ^{(nl)} ^{(fr)}	Yes		Dilsen-Stokkem	Haagstraat 19	51.05165°N 5.73583°E	71535 Info	
village house ^{(nl)} ^{(fr)}			Dilsen-Stokkem	Haagstraat	51.05235°N 5.73171°E	71536 Info	
Single double house ^{(nl)} ^{(fr)}			Dilsen-Stokkem	Haagstraat 2	51.05231°N 5.73709°E	71538 Info	
two-house farm ^{(nl)}			Dilsen-Stokkem	Haagstraat 6	51.05231°N 5.73654°E	71539 Info	
Remains of a farm ^{(nl)} ^{(fr)}			Dilsen-Stokkem	Haagstraat 12	51.05254°N 5.73542°E	71540 Info	
village house ^{(nl)} ^{(fr)}			Dilsen-Stokkem	Haagstraat 18	51.05277°N 5.73488°E	71541 Info	
two-house farm ^{(nl)}			Dilsen-Stokkem	Haagstraat 36	51.05282°N 5.73317°E	71542 Info	
House in New Objectivity ^{(nl)} ^{(fr)}			Dilsen-Stokkem	Haagstraat 37	51.05204°N 5.73424°E	71543 Info	
elongated farm ^{(nl)} ^{(fr)}			Dilsen-Stokkem	Haagstraat 42	51.05301°N 5.73218°E	71544 Info	

== See also ==
- List of onroerend erfgoed in Limburg (Belgium)
- Dilsen-Stokkem
