= Miss Europe 1950 =

International beauty pageant

- Date: 9 September 1950
- Venue: Rimini, Italy
- Entrants: 14
- Placements: 3
- Debuts: Portugal; San Marino
- Withdrawals: Great Britain; Ireland
- Returns: West Germany; Norway; Turkey
- Winner: Hanni Schall; Austria

Miss Europe 1950 was the 14th edition of the Miss Europe pageant, held in Rimini, Italy on 9 September 1950. At the end of the event, Juliette Figueras of France crowned Hanni Schall of Austria as Miss Europe 1950.

Contestants from fourteen countries competed in this year's pageant.

== Results ==
=== Placements ===
Placement	Contestant
Miss Europe 1950	Austria – Hanni Schall
1st runner-up	Italy – Emilia Giovanna Pala
2nd runner-up	Sweden – Ebba Adrian

== Contestants ==
=== Selection of participants ===
Contestants from fourteen countries competed in this edition. This edition saw the debuts of Portugal and San Marino, and the returns of Turkey who last competed in 1933, Germany who last competed in 1934, and Norway who last competed in 1938. Great Britain and Ireland withdrew in this edition.

A plenary session by the candidates was held during the pageant in Rimini where they have decided not to admit a "Miss Germany" but only a "Miss West Germany", provided that the candidate has no relation to the Nazis. The proposal to ban a "Miss Germany" from competing was provided by the contestants of Belgium, France, and Norway. Due to this, Susanne Firle Erichsen, the German candidate in this edition, was allowed to compete at Miss Europe, provided that she competes as Miss West Germany.

=== List of contestants ===
Fourteen contestants competed for the title.

Country/Territory	Contestant	Age (Note: Ages at the time of the pageant)	Hometown
Austria	Hanni Schall	23	Vienna
Belgium	Louise Frederica de Maesschalk	22	Antwerp
Denmark	Ellinor Harisin	22	Esjberg
Finland	Hilkka Marjatta Ruuska	18	Oulu
France	Claude Renault	21	Cannes
Holland	Hilda Lesman	21	Amsterdam
Italy	Emilia Giovanna Pala	19	Bologna
Norway	Aud Grenness	20	Oslo
Portugal	Maria da Conceição Pinto Viergas Louro	24	Lisbon
San Marino	Graziana Simonici	22	San Marino
Sweden	Ebba Adrian	19	Gothenburg
Switzerland	Frances Freiburghaus	17	Geneva
Turkey	Güler Arıman	19	Istanbul
West Germany	Susanne Firle Erichsen	24	Berlin

== Miss Europa 1951 ==
Miss Europa 1951
- Date: 30 September 1951
- Venue: Palermo, Italy
- Entrants: 8
- Placements: 4
- Debuts: Bulgaria; England; France; Italy; Sweden; Switzerland
- Winner: Jacqueline Genton; Switzerland

From 1951 to 2002, there was a rival Miss Europe competition organized by the "Comité Officiel et International Miss Europe". This was founded in 1950 by Jean Raibaut in Paris; the headquarters were later moved to Marseille. The winners wore different titles like Miss Europe, Miss Europa or Miss Europe International.

In 1951, the first of edition of the competition took place in Palermo, Italy on 30 September 1951. It was supposed to be held a day earlier but was postponed due to heavy rain. Eight contestants from seven countries competed in this year's pageant. At the end of the event, Jacqueline Genton of Switzerland was crowned as Miss Europa 1951.

=== Placements ===
Placement	Contestant
Miss Europa 1951	Switzerland – Jacqueline Genton
1st runner-up	(Italy) Italy – Giovanna Mazzotti
2nd runner-up	France – Monique Vallier; (Sweden) Sweden – Elizabeth Mayerhoffer (tie)

=== List of contestants ===
Eight contestants competed for the title, four of which are unknown.

Country/Territory	Contestant	Age	Hometown
Bulgaria	N/A		
England	N/A		
France	Monique Vallier	22	Constantin, French Algeria
Italy	Giovanna Mazzotti	17	Milan
Monaco	N/A		
Overseas France	N/A		
Sweden	Elizabeth Mayerhoffer	-	Stockholm
Switzerland	Jacqueline Genton	20	La Tour-de-Peilz
