= Dominique Rinderknecht =

Swiss model and TV host (born 1989)

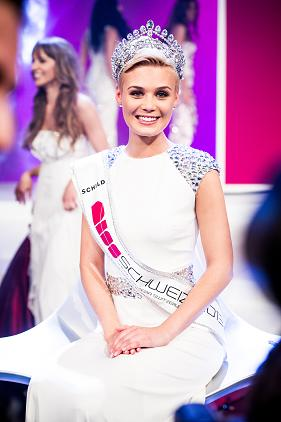
- Dominique Rinderknecht, Miss Switzerland 2013
- Born: Dominique Rinderknecht; 14 July 1989 (age 37); Zürich, Switzerland
- Height: 1.75 m (5 ft 9 in)
- Beauty pageant titleholder
- Title: Miss Switzerland 2013
- Hair color: Blonde
- Eye color: Blue
- Major competitions: Miss Switzerland 2013 (Winner); Miss Universe 2013 (Top 16)

Dominique Rinderknecht (born 14 July 1989) is a Swiss model, TV host and beauty pageant titleholder who won the title of Miss Switzerland 2013 and represented her country at the Miss Universe 2013 pageant.

== Early life and personal life ==
Rinderknecht was a public relations and communications student at the University of Zurich at the time of the 2013 pageant and has since acquired her bachelor's degree. From 2016 until 2020, she dated the French-born Swiss model Tamy Glauser. She is also the first openly LGBT person who has been crowned Miss Switzerland. Dominique lives between Switzerland and South Africa, engaged to South African pilot and musician Drew Gage as of 2021.

== Miss Schweiz 2013 ==
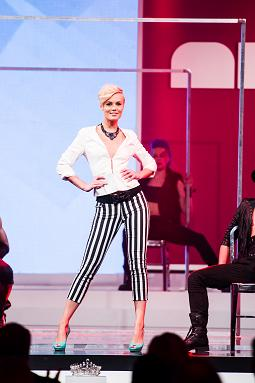
Miss Switzerland 2013 contest

Rinderknecht, from Zürich, was crowned Miss Switzerland 2013 during the pageant held on 8 June. The 1st and 2nd runners-up were Sara Wicki and Janine Baumann. The Miss Switzerland pageant lost its deal with television in 2011. There was no pageant in 2012, however the 2013 edition returned in full force with a TV broadcast through Sat.1.

She competed at Miss Universe 2013 where she finished in the top 16. Her successor as Miss Switzerland was Laetitia Guarino.

Awards and achievements
Preceded by Alina Buchschacher	Miss Switzerland; 2013	Succeeded by Zoé Metthez
