= Penelope Plummer =

Australian model, actress, and beauty queen

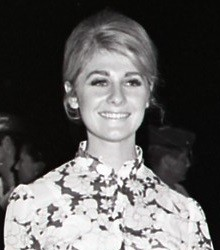
- Penelope Plummer, 1968
- Born: 26 October 1949 (age 75); Kempsey, New South Wales, Australia
- Occupation: Model
- Known for: Miss World Australia
- Awards: Miss World 1968

Penelope Plummer (born 26 October 1949) is an Australian actress, model and beauty queen who was crowned Miss World 1968. The then 18-year-old librarian from Kempsey, New South Wales, became the first contestant from her country to win the title. The pageant was held in London, United Kingdom.

After winning the Miss World Contest, Plummer appeared in The 1969 Bob Hope Christmas Show in Osan, Korea, along with Swedish-American actress Ann-Margret.

Penelope Plummer married Michael Clarke on 1 January 1970 in Gosford, New South Wales.

A rose was named "Penelope Plummer" in 1970.

== Extra reading ==
- Dollery, Mark (2016). Jensen V8: The Complete Story of the American-Powered Cars. Crowood. p. 359. ISBN 9781785001239. Penelope Plummer receives a Jensen Interceptor car termed "Miss World Car".

Awards and achievements
Preceded by (Peru) Madeleine Hartog-Bel	Miss World; 1968	Succeeded by (Austria) Eva Rueber-Staier
Preceded by Judy Lockey	Miss World Australia; 1968	Succeeded by Stefane Meurer
