= Kerstin Cook =

Swiss-British model (born 1989)

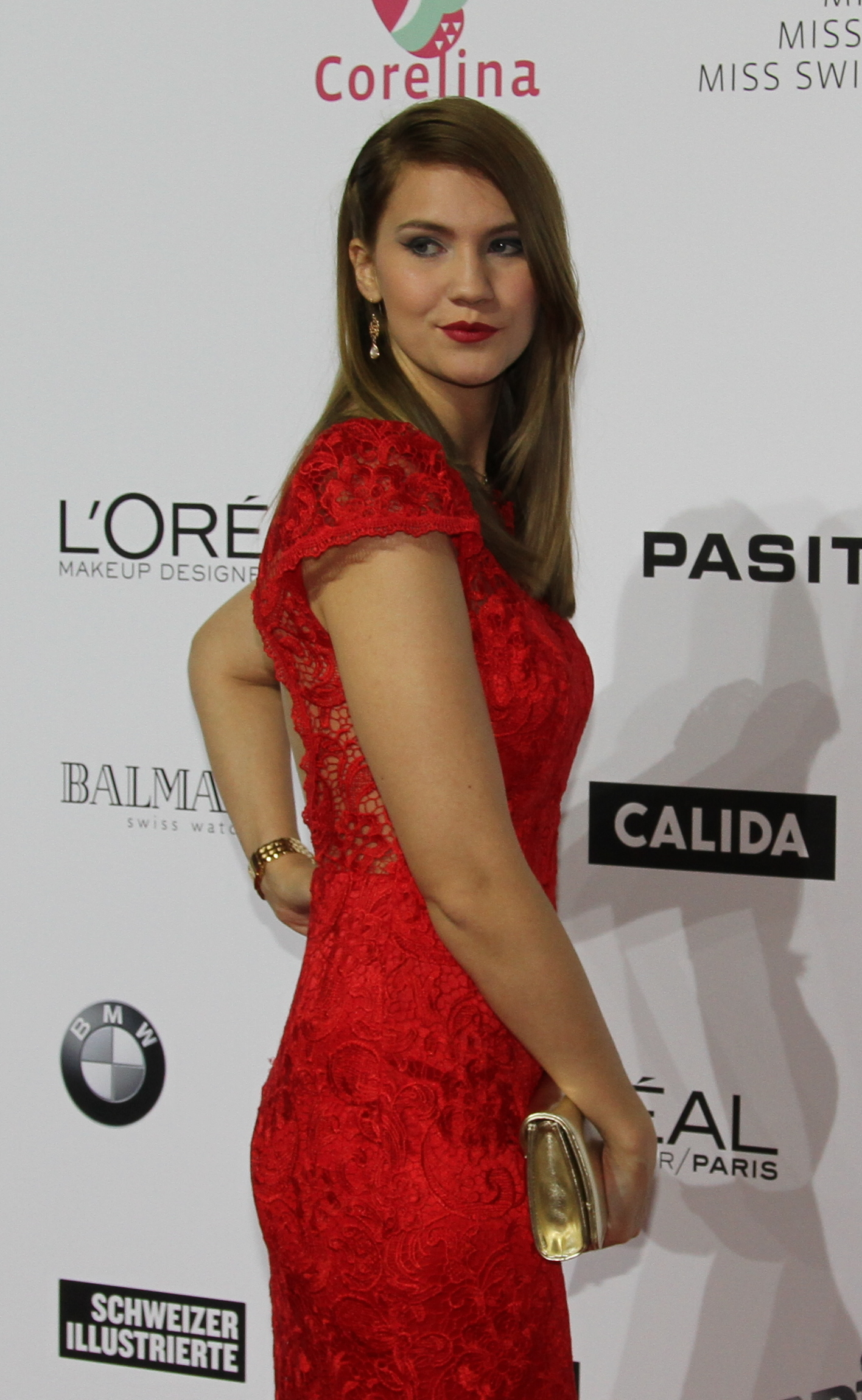
- Born: Kerstin Cook; 15 April 1989 (age 37); Kriens, Lucerne, Switzerland
- Height: 1.80 m (5 ft 11 in)
- Beauty pageant titleholder
- Title: Miss Switzerland 2010
- Hair color: Light brown
- Eye color: Blue
- Major competitions: Miss Switzerland 2010 (Winner) (Miss Photogenic); Miss Universe 2011 (Unplaced)

Kerstin Cook (German pronunciation: [ˈkɛʁstɪn ˈkʊk]; born 15 April 1989) is a Swiss-British model and beauty pageant titleholder who won Miss Switzerland 2010 and then represented her country in the 2011 Miss Universe pageant.

== Early life ==
She is born to English parents, Karen and Derek and she has two older brothers Richard (born 1985) and James (born 1987). Cook has been working as a model since age 14. She has a degree in environmental science and works for the Swiss animal help organization STS. She was an avid sportswoman, participating in athletics and inline skating.

== Miss Switzerland 2010 ==
Cook, who stands 1.80 m (5 ft 11 in) tall, competed as one of the 12 finalists in her country's national beauty pageant, Miss Switzerland, held in Zürich, where she obtained the Photogenic award and the crown of Miss Schweiz, gaining the right to represent Switzerland in the 2011 Miss Universe pageant, broadcast live from São Paulo, Brazil on 12 September 2011.

Prior to finals night, Cook discovered her grandmother in Cambridge had a cancer recurrence, and would have to undergo chemotherapy. Unable to travel to England, Cook dedicated her participation in Miss Switzerland to her.

Awards and achievements
| Preceded by Linda Fäh | Miss Switzerland; 2010 | Succeeded by Alina Buchschacher |
