= Miss Europe 1938 =

International beauty pageant

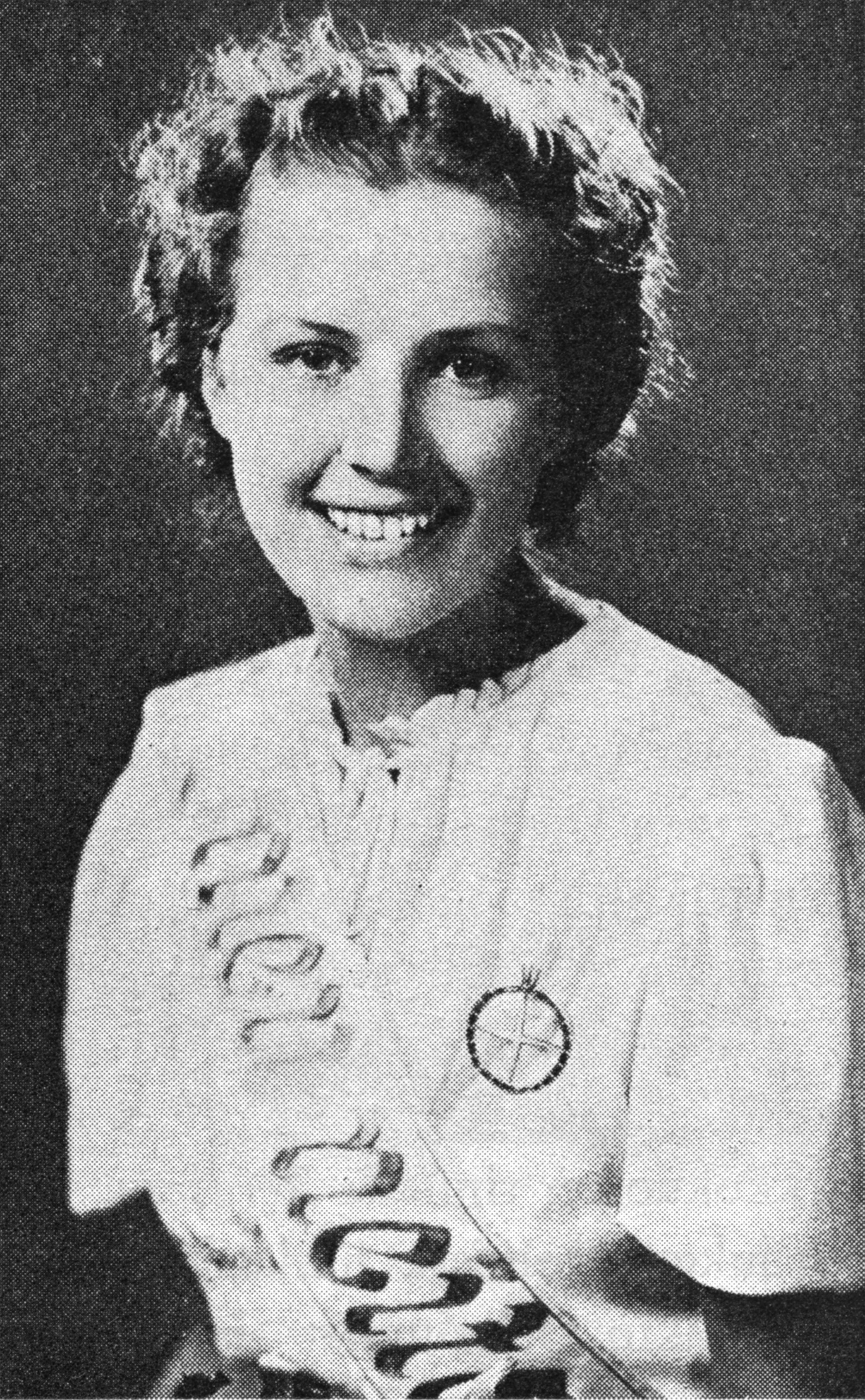
- Miss Finland and Miss Europe 1938, Sirkka Salonen
- Date: September 10, 1938
- Venue: Copenhagen, Denmark
- Entrants: 12
- Withdrawals: Denmark & Poland
- Returns: England, Greece, Hungary, Sweden, Yugoslavia
- Winner: Sirkka Salonen; Finland

Miss Europe 1938, was the 11th edition of the Miss Europe pageant and the tenth and final edition under Maurice de Waleffe. The contest ended due to events leading to World War II. After the war ended Maurice de Waleffe died in 1946 leaving the pageant without an organizer until 1948 when Mr. Roger Zeigler (of the Moulin Rouge) and Claude Berr founded the Mondial Events Organization which started to sponsor and organize the pageant that year. This lasted until 2003 when the Mondial Events Org. sold the pageant to Endemol France (the French branch of the Dutch company Endemol). This years contest was held in Copenhagen, Denmark on September 10, 1938. Sirkka Salonen of Finland was crowned Miss Europe 1938.

== Results ==
=== Placements ===
Final results	Contestant
Miss Europe 1938	Finland – Sirkka Salonen

== Contestants ==
- Belgium – Mary Van Leda
- England – Doris Williams
- Finland – Sirkka Salonen
- France – Annie Carriques
- Greece – Luisa Papadiamantakis
- Hungary – Anny Zalay
- Norway – Else Hammer
- Russia (in exile) – Kseniya Dashkevich
- Spanish Republic – Isa Reyes
- Sweden – Doris Lundh
- Switzerland – Maita Brun
- (Kingdom of Yugoslavia) Yugoslavia – Olga Dinjaski
