= Anne Marie Braafheid =

Curaçao model

Anne Marie Braafheid is a Curaçaoan actress and beauty pageant titleholder who became the first black woman to attain the position of first runner-up in the Miss Universe 1968 contest. As Miss Curaçao, she was the choice of two judges for the Miss Universe title, which was won that year by Miss Brazil. At the time, she was a primary school teacher.
