= Tamy Glauser =

Swiss fashion model

- Born: Tamara Glauser; January 2, 1985 (age 41); Paris, France
- Occupations: Model; Activist; Writer; Politician
- Partner: Dominique Rinderknecht (2016–2020)
- Parents: Stefan Hofer (father); Lolita Glauser (mother); Charlotte Winzenried (foster mother); Heinz Winzenried (foster father)
- Relatives: Walther Hofer (grandfather)
- Modeling information
- Agency: Next Management

Tamara Glauser, known professionally as Tamy Glauser (born 2 January 1985) is a French-born Swiss fashion model, writer, politician, and LGBT rights activist. Glauser, who is non-binary and uses gender neutral pronouns, is known for their adrogynous appearance. They have modelled for Louis Vuitton, Vivienne Westwood, Givenchy, and Jean Paul Gaultier. In 2019, Glauser received a nomination from the Green Party of Switzerland to run for a seat in the National Council of Switzerland, but suspended the campaign before elections began.

== Early life and family ==
Glauser was born on 2 January 1985 in Paris. Their father, Stefan Hofer, whom they did not meet until they were seventeen years old, is the son of the historian and Swiss People's Party politician Walther Hofer. Their mother, Lolita Glauser, is half-Nigerian and half-Swiss former model. Glauser was born while their mother was in France celebrating New Year's Eve with friends. They were raised by their godparents, who later became their foster parents, Charlotte and Heinz Winzenried. Their foster father was a prominent entrepreneur and politician who owned a large cardboard factory, and the family lived in a large, four-story mansion in Stettlen, Bern, staffed with servants.

== Career ==
Glauser moved to New York City, to study sociology, when they were twenty one years old. They dropped out of college and began working as a model, posing as both male and female runway shows and magazine spreads. Glauser, represented by Next Management, has modelled for Vivienne Westwood, Louis Vuitton, Givenchy, and Jean Paul Gaultier. They are known for their adrogynous appearance.

Glauser is an advocate for same-sex marriage and LGBT rights in Switzerland. They published an autobiography in November 2018.

In 2019, Glauser was nominated for election to the National Council of Switzerland by the Green Party of Switzerland, but withdrew their candacy before the elections began.

== Personal life ==
Glauser dated Swiss beauty pageant winner Dominique Rinderknecht from 2016 to 2020. Glauser came out as non-binary in 2021 and stated that they use gender-neutral pronouns. Since 2020, they have lived in Winterthur.

Glause has prosopagnosia.
