= Miss Switzerland 2008 =

Beauty pageant edition

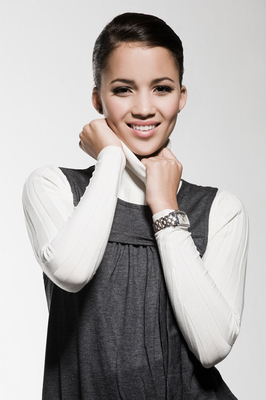
- Date: 26 September 2008
- Entertainment: Giusy Ferreri, Garou and Gabriella Cilmi
- Broadcaster: La 1, Télévision Suisse Romande and SRG SSR idée suisse
- Entrants: 16
- Winner: Whitney Toyloy; Vaud

The Miss Switzerland 2009 pageant was held on 26 September 2008. There were 16 candidates representing the cantons of the country that were competing for the national crown. The winner will enter in Miss Universe 2009 and Miss World 2009. Not all the contestants came from the canton they were originally from.

== Candidates ==
Canton	Contestant	Age	Height	Hometown
Aargau	Stefanie Frei	22	1.80	Brugg
Ticino	Lisa Panigada	22	1.68	Sementina
Basel-Stadt	Alessia Novak	21	1.81	Basel
Bern	Emilie Lindblom	21	1.71	Bern
Fribourg	Céline Roscheck	25	1.83	Villars-sur-Glâne
Geneva	Fiona Fariña	20	1.72	Geneva
Grisons	Nathalie Schillinger	22	1.73	Schiers
Lucerne	Selver Yavuz	20	1.70	Windisch
Neuchâtel	Katja Diethelm	24	1.70	Zürich
Solothurn	Diana Knezevic	22	1.76	Grenchen
Thurgau	Dominique Knill	21	1.82	Frauenfeld
Ticino	Lucile Epper	24	1.80	Cademario
Valais	Alexandra Feybli	19	1.75	Zürich
Vaud	Whitney Toyloy	18	1.77	Yverdon
Zug	Nancy Kabika	24	1.76	Geneva
Zürich	Rekha Datta	20	1.72	Winkel
