= Mahara McKay =

Mahara McKay (born March 1981 in New Zealand) is a Swiss-based conscious facilitator and educator specializing in personal growth and holistic practices.

== Early life and pageantry ==
McKay was born in New Zealand to a Māori father and a Swiss mother, and later relocated to Switzerland. In 2000, she was crowned Miss Switzerland. She subsequently represented Switzerland at the Miss World 2000 and Miss Universe 2001 pageants.

== Music and media career (2003–2013) ==
Following her pageantry career, McKay worked internationally as a model, DJ, and music producer between 2003 and 2013. She released three music compilations through Universal Music, and three of her tracks were featured on the Café del Mar compilations. As an international DJ, she performed at high-profile events, including the Tony Hawk Show at the Grand Palais in Paris and the New York City Fashion Week.

== Career transition and training (2013–2015) ==
Following a severe knee injury that halted her public career, McKay stepped away from the entertainment industry to pursue a year-long global travel and training period. In India, she spent a month at a Kriya Yoga Ashram in Rishikesh, studying under Swami Shankarananda Giri, focusing on meditation, Hatha Yoga, and pranayama. During her travels, she completed a Hatha Dharma Teacher Training course with Chris Cotty in Fiji, specialized in Hatha Yoga with Emily Kuser in Bali, and completed a Women’s Wisdom Teacher Training course with Nianna Bray in Queenstown, New Zealand.

== Personal development and facilitation (2015–present) ==
In 2015, McKay established the "2nd Floor Yoga" studios in Dunedin, New Zealand, where she taught for two years. Following her time in New Zealand, she returned to India, where she developed her methodology in "Tantra Meditation" and "Tantra Energy". For the next four years, she operated as an international nomadic teacher, facilitating personal development workshops across various countries, and briefly participated in an off-grid community project in Portugal.

In 2020, during the onset of the COVID-19 pandemic, McKay was grounded in India for seven months due to international travel restrictions. Following her return to Switzerland, and with global borders remaining closed, she established a local teaching practice in a residential studio. Over the subsequent three years, she expanded her local student base and community engagement.

She continues to conduct international workshops, seminars, and retreats focusing on a multidisciplinary approach that integrates breathwork, meditation, yoga, and "Voice Liberation", a proprietary authorial methodology she developed as a synthesis of movement, breath, and vocal practices intended for personal transformation. Alongside immersive retreats, the application of the methodology is designed to expand into educational, corporate, and healthcare environments. She also leads tantra meditation sessions as a resident teacher at the Serratus wellness center in Zürich.

In 2024, McKay established Equilibra, a retreat center located in Filzbach, at an old silk factory in the midst of the Swiss Alps. The center hosts bilingual advanced training programs, seminars, and workshops in German and English centered on mental and physical well-being. In February 2025, she signed a production contract for an upcoming feature-length biographical documentary mapping her life journey, developed by the production team associated with the documentary Finding Happiness.

Today, her professional focus is dedicated to "Voice Liberation", her self-developed methodology - and facilitating personal growth through voice, sound, breath, and consciousness practices, rooted in love.
