= Dilsen-Stokkem =

- City and municipality
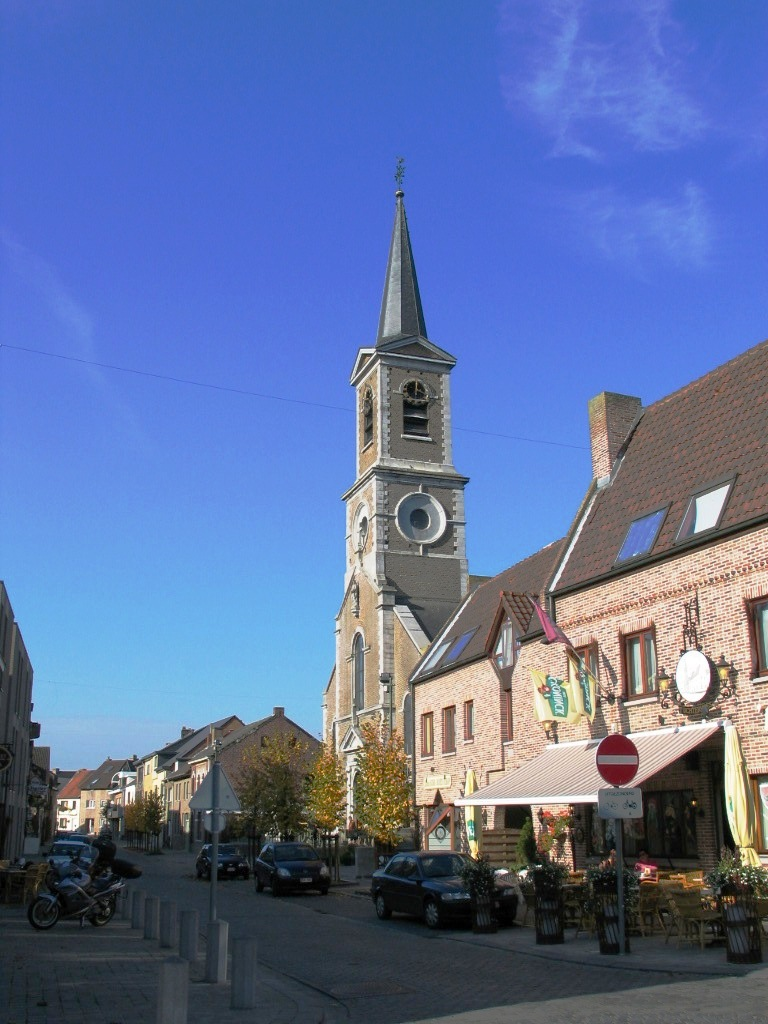
- Stokkem

- Flag Coat of arms

- Location of Dilsen-Stokkem in Limburg
- Interactive map of Dilsen-Stokkem
- Location in Belgium
- Coordinates: 51°02′N 05°44′E
- Country: Belgium
- Community: Flemish Community
- Region: Flemish Region
- Province: Limburg
- Arrondissement: Maaseik

Government
  - Mayor: Sofie Vandeweerd (Open VLD)
  - Governing parties: OpenVLD, Vooruit Dils-Stok

Area
  - Total: 65.89 km^{2} (25.44 sq mi)

Population (2018-01-01)
  - Total: 20,454
  - Density: 310.4/km^{2} (804.0/sq mi)
- Postal codes: 3650
- NIS code: 72041
- Area codes: 089
- Website: www.dilsen-stokkem.be

Dilsen-Stokkem (Dutch pronunciation: [ˈdɪlsə(n) ˈstɔkɛm]; Limburgish: Dilse-Stokkem; French: Dilsen-Stockem) is a municipality and city located in the Belgian province of Limburg. On 1 January 2018, Dilsen-Stokkem had a total population of 20,454. The total area is 65.61 km² which gives a population density of 312 inhabitants per km².

The municipality consists of the following sub-municipalities: Dilsen, Elen, Lanklaar, Rotem, and Stokkem.

== Notable people of Dilsen-Stokkem ==
- Luca Brecel (born 8 March 1995), professional snooker player, 2023 World Snooker Champion
- Sonja Doumen (Miss Belgium 1968)
- Jacky Mathijssen (born 20 July 1963), football player and manager
- Jos Vaessen (born 21 March 1944)
