= Juan Vítola =

Argentine theater and film actor

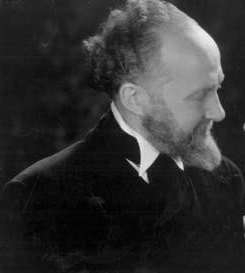
- 1936
- Born: Buenos Aires, Argentina
- Died: Buenos Aires, Argentina
- Other names: Juan Vittola
- Occupation: Actor

Juan Vítola was an Argentine theater and film actor.

== Career ==
Vítola (also billed as Juan Vittola) was well-known in Argentina's theater scene and as a cinematic actor of that country's golden age. He shared the stage with important figures of the day such as Tulia Ciámpoli, Irma Córdoba, Eloy Álvarez, Enrique Muiño, Oscar Soldati, Rosa Rosen, Raimundo Pastore, Arturo García Buhr, and María Esther Podestá.

=== Theater ===
Vítola was a dedicated theatrical actor. He was a member of the first cast of the Teatro Cómico in 1927, forming part of the Compañía de Comedias y Sainetes Luis Arata with Berta Gangloff, Emma Bernal, Leonor Rinaldi, Mercedes Delgado, Blanca Crespo, A. Villavicencio, María Casenave, Delia Prieto, Carmen Villegas, Marcelo Ruggero, Juan Fernández, Ignacio Corsini, Froilán Varela, Carlos Rosingana, Jorge Gangloff, Enrique Duca, Ernesto Villegas, and Alberto Fregolini. His best-known works included

- Facha Tosta, by Alberto Novión, in the role of Estéfano
- Veraneamos en bañadera
- El barrio está de fiesta
- Se acabaron los otarios
- El mago de Palermo
- Te quiero porque sos reo
- Sierra chica
- Yo soy un tipo de línea
- Caferata
- Los muchachos de antes fumaban Avanti

In 1945 he appeared in the Teatro Odeón work Claudia with Delia Garcés, Enrique Álvarez Diosdado, Milagros de la Vega, María Luisa Fernández, Eduardo Navega, Alita Román, and Margarita Corona.

=== Filmography ===
- Internado (1935)
- Vértigo (1936)
- La casa de Quirós (1937)
- Melgarejo (1937)
- El cabo Rivero (1938)
- El Gran camarada (1938)
- Con el dedo en el gatillo (1940)
- Delirio (1944)
