= Aricò =

Aricò or Arico is an Italian surname, mainly found in Southern Italy (Sicily, Calabria). Notable people with the surname include:

- José Aricó, Argentine sociologist
- Kim Barnes Arico, American basketball coach
- Larry Arico, American football coach
- Pedro Arico Suárez, Argentine footballer
- Rodolfo Aricò, Italian painter
- Antonio Aricò, Mediterranean Designer

== See also ==
- Arico, a municipality and village on Tenerife, Canary Islands, Spain
