= Villa María, Córdoba =

Villa María
- City
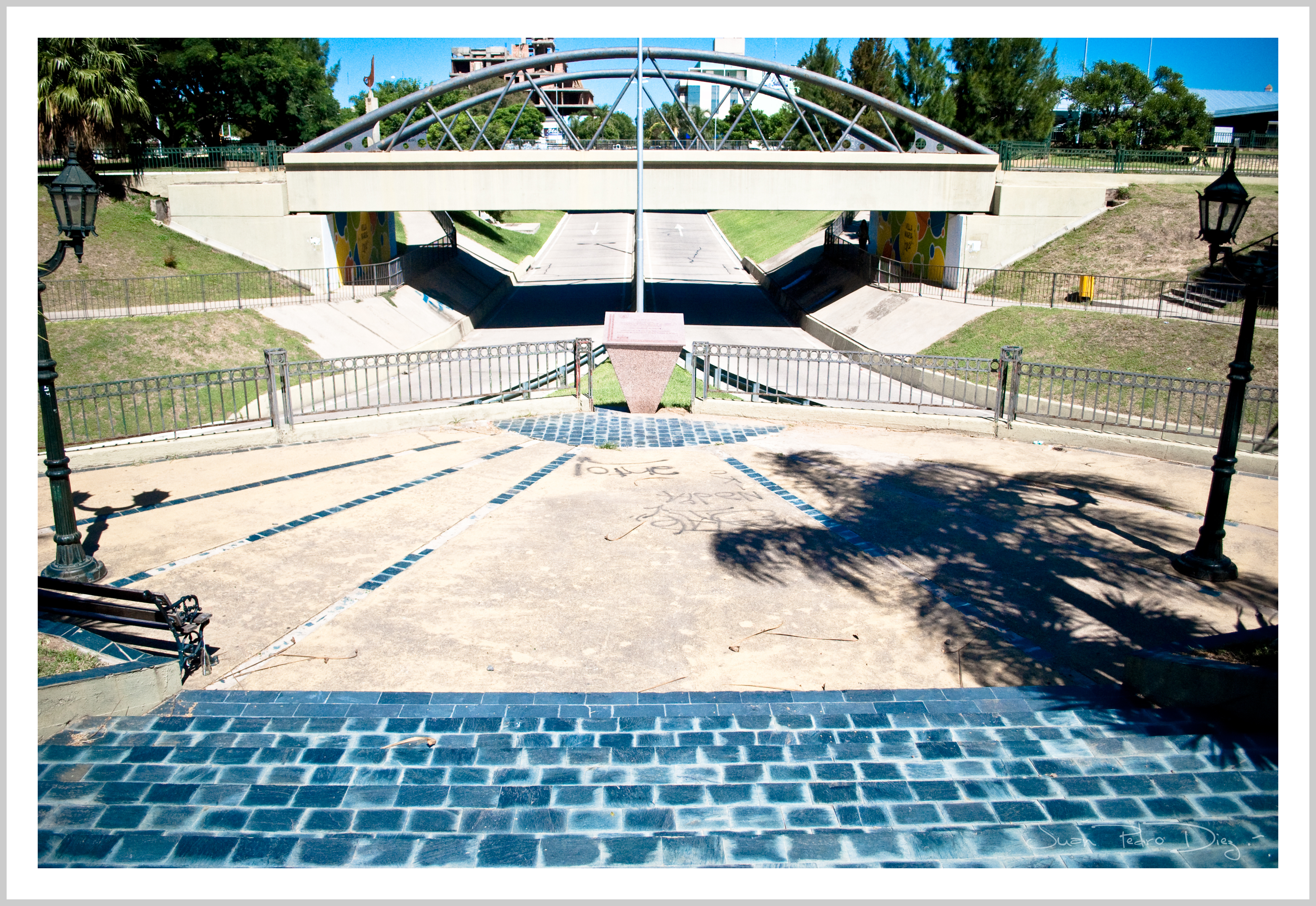

- Flag

- Location of Villa María in Argentina Villa María (Argentina)
- Coordinates: 32°24′37″S 63°13′53″W
- Country: Argentina
- Province: Córdoba
- Department: General San Martín
- Founded: September 27, 1867
- Founder: Manuel Anselmo Ocampo

Government
  - Intendant: Eduardo Accastello (PJ)
- Elevation: 196 m (643 ft)

Population (2022 census)
  - Total: 96.061
- Demonym: villamariense
- Time zone: UTC−3 (ART)
- CPA base: X5900
- Dialing code: +54 353
- Website: Official website

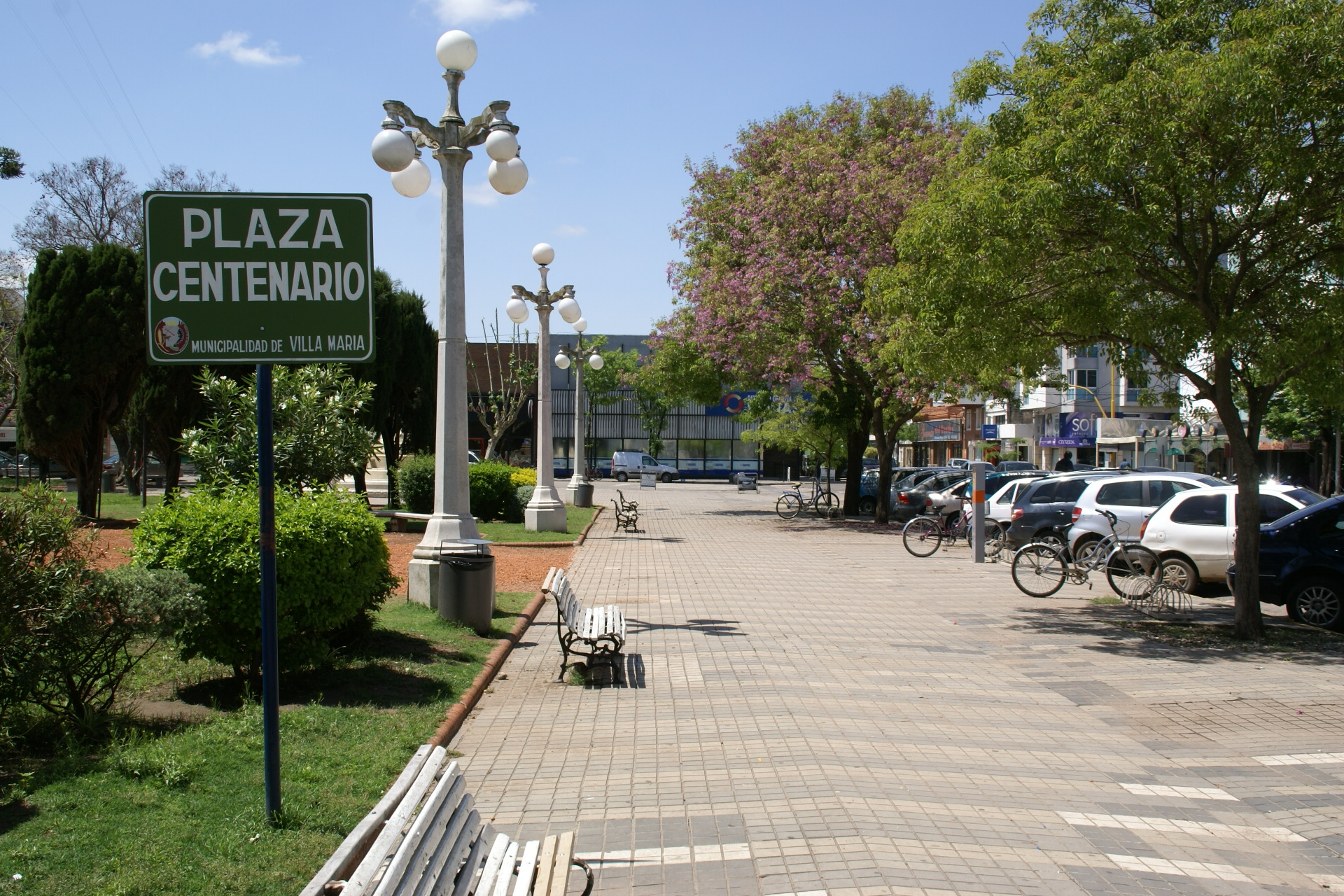
Plaza Centenario

Villa María is a city in Córdoba Province, Argentina, and the head town of the General San Martín Department. It is located in the center of rich agricultural land. The area leads the country in production of milk. The city has a population of 72,162 per the 2001 census [INDEC] (Greater Villa María: 119,000), which makes it the third largest city in the province.

The city lies 137 km southeast from the provincial capital, on the left bank of the Tercero River, near the geographical center of Argentina, at the intersection of National Routes 9 and 158, and right next to the Cordoba-Buenos Aires Highway, one of the nation's most important communication arteries.

== Notable people ==
- Sol Gabetta, cellist (1981)
- Rubén Magnano, basketball coach (1954)
- Mauro Rosales, football player (1981)
- Yayo Guridi, humorist (1965)
- Karina Jelinek, model (1981)
- José Aricó, writer (1931–1991)
- Amadeo Sabattini, politician (1892–1960)
- Juan Cruz Gill, football player (1983)
- Sebastián Brusco, football player (1974)
- Franco Jara, football player (1988)
- Albano Bizzarri, football player (1977)
- Marcelo Ingaramo, tennis player (1962)
- Magalí Romitelli, model (1987)
- Germán Berterame, football player (1998)
- Enzo Barrenechea, football player (2001)

== Education ==
In July 2025 the municipality announced the start of earth-moving works for the construction of a new campus of the private institution Universidad Siglo 21, together with a road-widening project on Route 2 to improve access to the new campus and the adjacent industrial park.
