= Delirio =

Delirio may refer to:

- Delirio (1944 film), an Argentine comedy film
- Delirio (1954 film), a French-Italian film
- Delirio (2024 film), a psychological horror film
- Delirio, a 2007 album by Sinergia
- "Delirio", a song by Luis Miguel from Segundo Romance
- Delirio, a 1977 novel by Barbara Alberti

== See also ==
- Delirio de Grandeza (disambiguation)
