= René Cóspito =

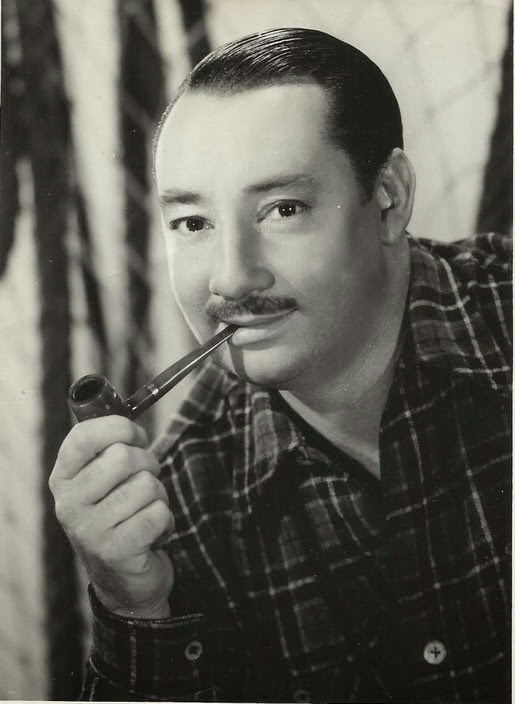

Background information
- Also known as: Don Goyo
- Born: 23 May 1905; Buenos Aires, Argentina
- Died: 11 March 2000 (aged 94) Buenos Aires, Argentina
- Genres: Tango, jazz
- Occupations: Musician, actor, pianist
- Instruments: Piano, violin

René Cóspito (23 May 1905 – 11 March 2000) was an Argentine musician and actor. He played the piano and violin and was dedicated to tango and jazz. He was known by the nickname "Don Goyo."

== Life ==
He was born in Villa Devoto. His father, Antonio, had a music teaching institute where René learned to play the violin and piano. He began his musical career at the Elite cinema in Belgrano, where he played the piano. At the age of 10, his father took him to the Teatro Colón so he could earn some money, where he had to play with other musicians. He graduated as a music teacher at the age of 13. In his youth, he gave up the violin and devoted himself to playing the piano.

In 1923, at the age of 17, he made his professional debut performing musical pieces for silent films featuring major show business stars. In 1926, he formed the group René Cóspito y sus Cuatro Muchachos Melódicos, with which he played on a radio station located in Flores.

In 1928, he was invited by Juan Carlos Cobián to play tangos in piano duets, and from that year until 1932, he partnered with Eduardo Armani, with whom he formed the group "Armani-Cóspito Jazz." In 1931, he married Violeta Blanca Díaz, great-granddaughter of Colonel Carmelo Díaz.

He performed alongside other music figures such as Juan d'Arienzo and Carlos Gardel at the Paramount cinema.

Later, he took part in a radio series called Los grandes bailables de Geniol, with Francisco Canaro, Roberto Firpo, and Feliciano Brunelli, where they were announced as Los Cuatro Ases (The Four Aces).

Since 1925, he had been performing seasonal engagements in Mar del Plata at hotels such as the Bristol and Hermitage, and in luxurious cafés like Normandie and Havana at the Gran Hotel Provincial. He continued performing seasonal engagements until the age of 87. He also played at cafés like Adlon and Richmond, as well as Maison Dorée.

In the 1930s, for four years, he performed music on cruises to Rio de Janeiro, Brazil. From 1935 to 1950, he played at various events with orchestras led by musicians such as Juan d'Arienzo and Julio de Caro. He played alongside his brothers Néstor and Hugo.

In the 1940s, he formed a jazz group, which on various occasions featured Hernán Oliva, Horacio Malvicino, Ahmed Ratip, Panchito Cao, and Barry Moral. His groups played at venues like the Jockey Club, where Osvaldo Fresedo's orchestra also performed.

After 1945, he formed small ensembles and played on radio stations such as Belgrano, Mitre, and Splendid, eventually producing major broadcasts. At the end of the 1950s, when he played at the Hotel Crillon, a representative from Columbia, Mr. Taylor, asked him to record a demo in his studio. He liked his versatility and offered him to record tangos forming a trio, accompanied by guitar and double bass. He requested 20 tangos, with the condition that he use another name so he wouldn't be associated, which gave rise to the pseudonym Don Goyo.

He had a repertoire of 2,600 pieces, including Poor Butterfly, I Can't Give You Anything but Love, Baby, Spanish Lady, Smoke Gets in Your Eyes, A Pretty Girl Is Like a Melody, and Tea for Two, among others. He also performed on Radio Mitre.

In 1972, he arrived in the United States, served as an ambassador of tango, and performed at the Waldorf Astoria, giving a recital at the OAS in Washington. He then played tangos in various places such as New York City, Hollywood, and in schools and universities. He gave his final performances in luxury hotels, playing in small venues.

He had an important role in national cinema: first playing piano as background music for silent films, and later as the Lead Musician of Sound Films.

In 1995, he received a Special Mention from the Konex Awards for his career and contribution to popular music.

== Death ==
He died on March 11, 2000, at the age of 94 in Buenos Aires.

== Films ==
As a performer:

- Los apuros de Claudina (1938)
- Dancing (1933)

Soundtrack:

- Internado (1935)

Songs:

- Carmiña (Su historia de amor) (1975)
