= Miss Argentina =

National beauty pageant competition in Argentina

Miss Universo Argentina Organization
- Formation: 1928; 98 years ago
- Type: Beauty pageant
- Headquarters: Buenos Aires
- Location: Argentina
- Members: Miss Universe
- Official language: Spanish
- President: Keno Manzur

Miss Argentina is a national beauty pageant in Argentina, founded in 1928. In 1962, Norma Nolan of Santa Fe became the first, and only, Miss Argentina to win the title of Miss Universe. Currently, the competition is managed by Keno Manzur, a beauty pageant entrepreneur.

== History ==
=== 1928—1937 ===
The Miss Argentina beauty contest was established in 1928 by El Hogar Magazine in Mar del Plata, Buenos Aires. The first winner was Túlia Ciámpoli of Cordoba. The pageant was attended by the President of Argentina, Marcelo T. de Alvear, and his wife Regina Pacini. The 1929 competition was organized by Caras y Caretas, a weekly magazine, and was won by Nelida Rodriguez Aragon.

In 1930, Critical magazine took over the event. In the same year, the winner of Miss Argentina (Celia Basavilbaso of Chaco) competed for the title of Miss Universe, in the International Pageant of Pulchritude, for the first time. In 1932, the News Carts Newspaper Corporation began organizing Miss Argentina and that year's winner, Ana Rover, competed in the penultimate International Pageant of Pulchritude, which was held in Belgium.

In 1937, after a five-year hiatus, the competition returned and was won by Elba Tardits.

=== 1954—1969 ===
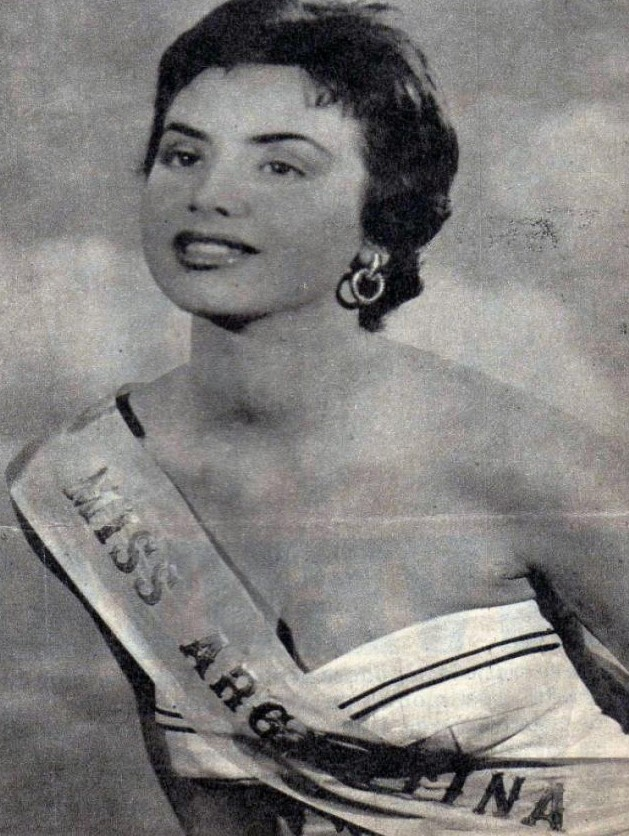
Isabel Sarli, winner of Miss Argentina 1955, who later developed a successful career as an actress.

In 1954, the competition returned and was organised by Mundo Redial Production. Ivana Olga Kislinger won the title of Miss Argentina and went on to compete in Miss Universe 1954, which was held in California. This was the first time Miss Argentina competed in the new Miss Universe competition, which was established in 1952.

Norma Nolan, from Santa Fe, won Miss Argentina in 1962 and went on to become the first Argentine to win the title of Miss Universe. The competition was held in Miami, Florida.

In 1965, Canal 7 broadcast Miss Argentina for the first time. In 1967, the Naico Agency took over the Miss Universe franchise in Argentina and the next year John Fischer and Channel 13 hosted the pageant at Casino Program.

=== 1970—1999 ===
In 1970, Héctor Larrea presented Miss Argentina, which was broadcast on Canal 13. In 1979, El Mundo del Espectáculo became the official program to select Miss Argentina's winner. In 1993, the Senorita Argentina contest was held by Nelly Raymond- this was the first year that Miss Argentina held the title of Senorita Argentina.

=== 2000—2018 ===
Between 2000 and 2003, Fenix Production and Fundación Favaloro held the Miss Argentina competition in Buenos Aires. In 2006, Mirta Schuster became the owner of the Miss Argentina beauty contest and renamed it the annual Miss Universo Argentina. In 2016, The Endamol Argentina and TNT Latin America became the owners of the Miss Universe franchise in Argentina.

=== 2019—2021 ===
Since 2019, the Miss Argentina competition has been officially managed by Osmel Sousa.

=== 2022 ===
Nadia Cerri Management is the national committee of Argentina in 2022. The winner designated from Argentine Miss who experienced at beauty contest.

=== 2023—Present ===
Keno Manzur took over the Miss Argentina brand. The new owner is also managing the Miss Chile Organization.

== Winners ==
Number of wins at major beauty pageants
Current franchises
Pageant	Titles	Winning year(s)
Miss Universe	1	1962
Miss World	2	1960, 1978
Miss International	1	1967
Miss Earth	0

=== Gallery ===
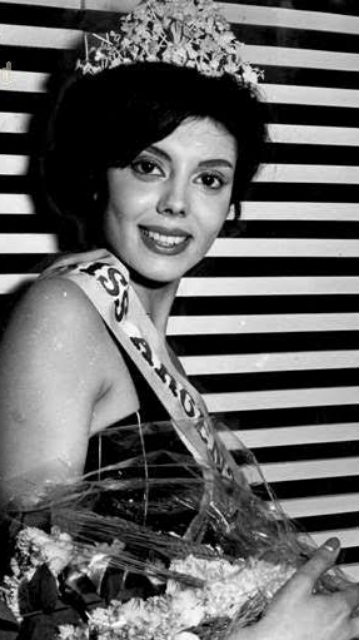
Norma Cappagli†, the first Argentine representative to achieve an international title, that of Miss World 1960.

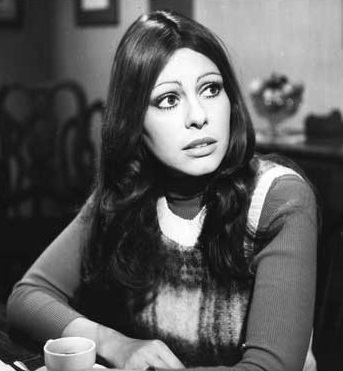
Mirta Massa, the first Argentine to achieve the title of Miss International, in 1967.

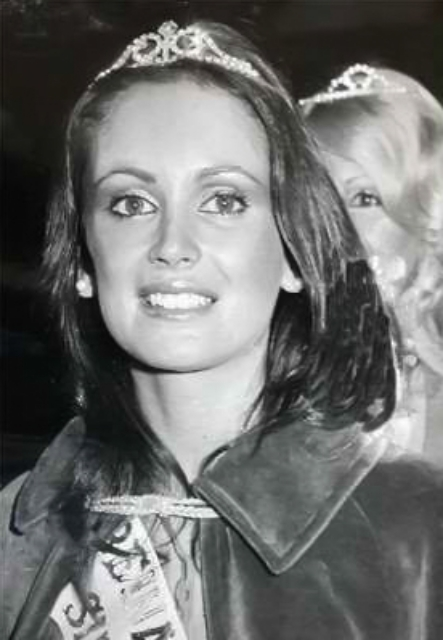
Silvana Suárez†, the second Argentine to achieve the title of Miss World, in 1978.

== Titleholders (1928—Present) ==
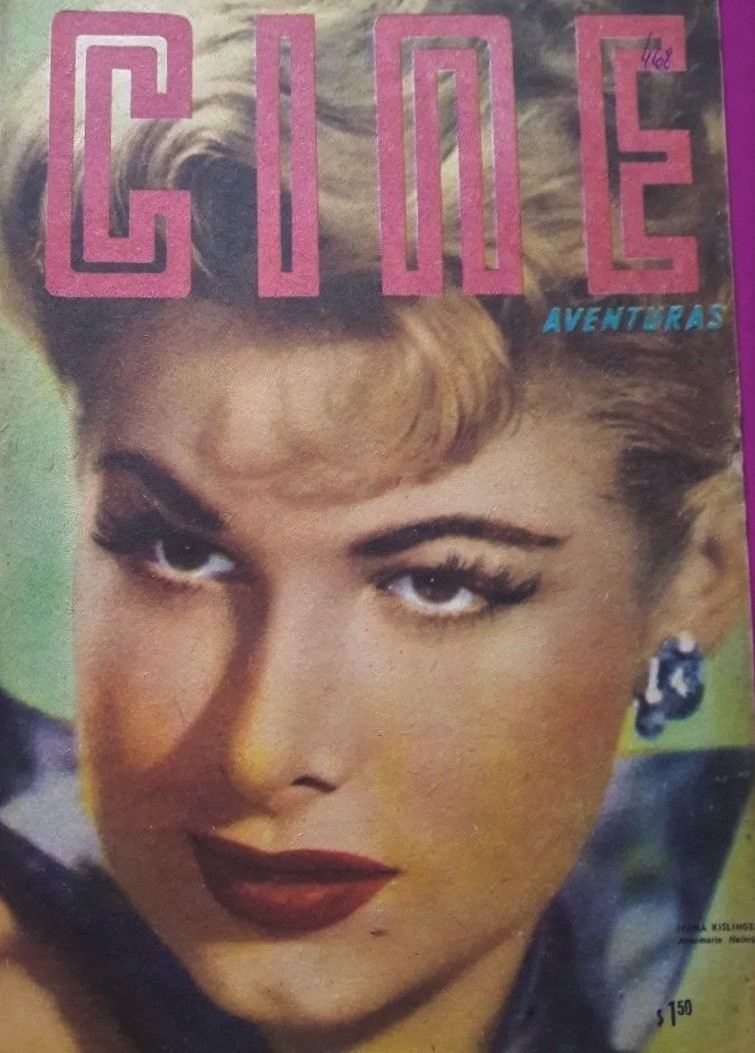
Ivana Olga Kislinger, first Miss Argentina for the Miss Universe.

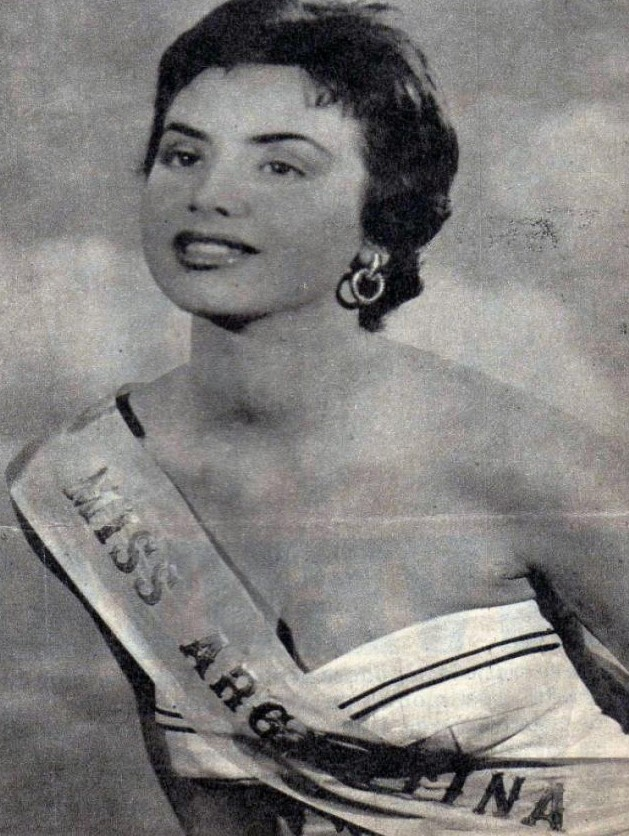
Isabel ''La Coca'' Sarli, Kislinger's successor in the 1955 miss universe.

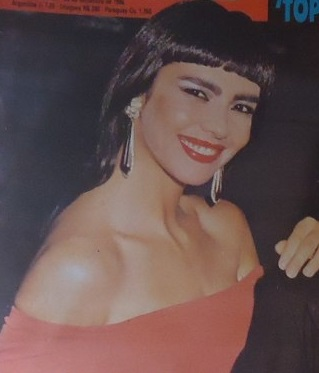
Susana Romero, Argentine representative for Miss Universe 1973.

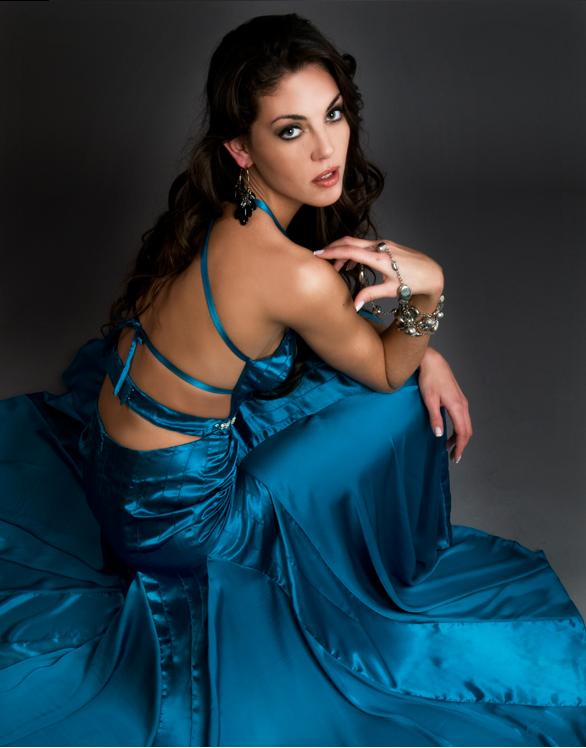
Johanna Lasic, Argentine representative in the Miss Universe 2009.

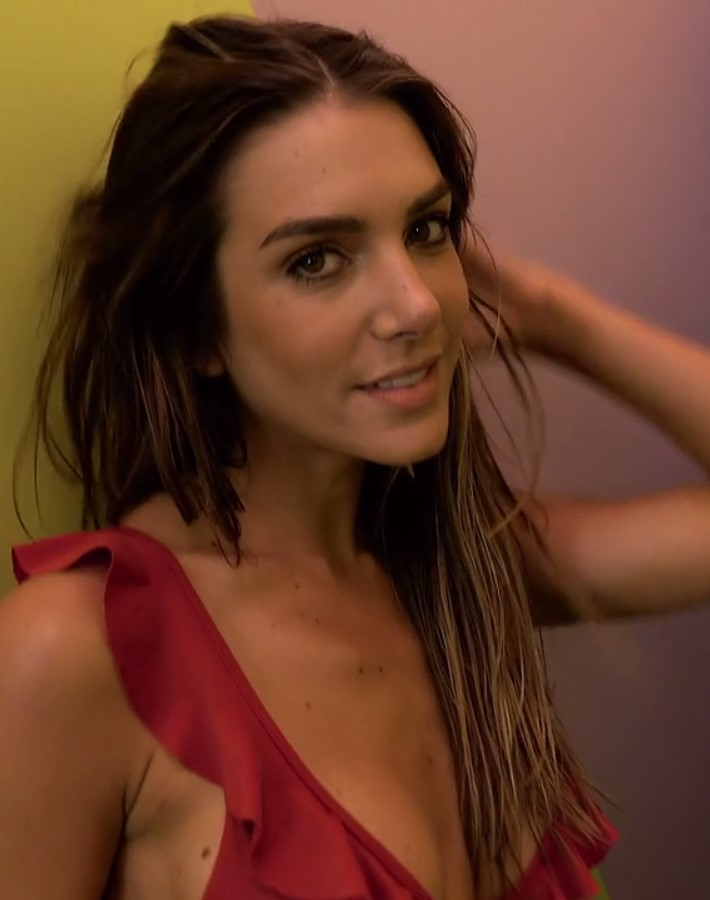
Valentina Ferrer, Argentine representative in the Miss Universe 2014.

Year	Miss Argentina	Province	Notes
1928	Tulia Ciámpoli Fierro†	Córdoba	First Miss Argentina
1929	Nélida Rodríguez Aragón	Santa Fe	
1930	Celia Basavilbaso	Chaco	
1932	Alejandina del Carmen Goni	Córdoba	
1935	Anita de Zavalía	Buenos Aires	
1937	Elba Tardits	Buenos Aires	Miss Sudamérica 1937
1954	Ivana Olga Kislinger	Buenos Aires	Mundo Redial Production directorship
1955	Hilda Isabel Sarli†	Entre Ríos	
1956	Ileana Carré	Buenos Aires	
1957	Mónica Lamas	Buenos Aires	
1958	Celina Mercedes Ayala	Misiones	
1959	Liana Cortijo	Buenos Aires Province	
1960	Rose Marie Lincke	Buenos Aires	
1961	Adriana Gardiazábal	Buenos Aires	
1962	Norma Beatriz Nolan	Santa Fe	Miss Universe 1962
1963	Olga Galuzzi	Buenos Aires Province	
1964	María Amalia Ramírez	Santa Fe	
1965	Mabel Azucena Caffarone	Buenos Aires Province	Did not compete
1966	Elba Beatriz Basso	Buenos Aires Province	El Arte de la Elegancia Directorship
1967	Amalia Yolanda Scuffi	Buenos Aires Province	
1968	Maria Del Carmen Jordan Vidal	Buenos Aires	
1969	Lidia Esther Pepe	Corrientes	
1970	Beatriz Marta Gros	Buenos Aires	Héctor Larrea directorship
1971	Alicia Beatriz Daneri	Buenos Aires	Reina Internacional del Café 1973
1972	Norma Elena Dudik	Buenos Aires Province	
1973	Susana Romero	Buenos Aires	
1974	Leonor Celmira Guggini	Buenos Aires	
1975	Rosa Del Valle Santillán	Tucumán	
1976	Lilian Noemí De Asti	Buenos Aires Province	
1977	Maritza Elizabet Jurado	Buenos Aires Province	
1978	Delia Stella Maris Muñoz	Córdoba	
1979	Adriana Virginia Álvarez	Buenos Aires Province	El Mundo del Espectáculo directorship
1980	Silvia Piedrabuena	Santa Fe	
1981	Susana Mabel Reynoso	Santa Cruz	Juan Alberto Mateyko and Nelly Raymond directorship
1982	María Alejandra Basile	Buenos Aires	
1983	María Daniela Carara	Buenos Aires Province	
1984	Leila Adar	Buenos Aires	
1985	Yanina Castaño	Buenos Aires Province	
1986	María de los Ángeles Fernández Espadero	Buenos Aires	
1987	Carolina Brachetti	Buenos Aires Province	
1988	Claudia Gabriela Pereyra	Buenos Aires	
1989	Luisa Norbis	Córdoba	
1990	Paola De La Torre	Salta	
1991	Verónica Flavia Honnorat	Chaco	
1992	Laura Verónica Rafael	Buenos Aires	Miss Globe International 1992
1993	Alícia Andrea Ramón	Chaco	Nelly Raymond directorship
1994	Solange Guadalupe Magnano†	Córdoba	
1995	Cecilia Gagliano	Buenos Aires Province	Did not compete
1996	Verónica Ledezma	Buenos Aires Province	
1997	Nazarena Vanesa González Almada	Buenos Aires	
1998	Marcela Viviana Brane	Córdoba	
1999	Elena Mabel Fournier Picciolo	Santa Fe	
2000	Andrea Nicastri Muchi	Buenos Aires Province	Fenix Production and Fundación Favaloro directorship
2001	Romina Incicco	Buenos Aires	
2003	Laura Constanza Romero Demelli	Buenos Aires Province	
2006	Magali Romitelli	Córdoba	Mirta Schuster directorship
2007	Daniela Alejandra Stucan Figlomeni	Buenos Aires Province	
2008	María Silvana Belli Vega	San Juan	
2009	Johanna Mariel Lašić Cid	Buenos Aires	
2010	Yésica Natalia Di Vincenzo	Buenos Aires Province	
2011	Natalia Soledad Rodríguez	Buenos Aires Province	
2012	Camila Solórzano Ayusa	Tucumán	
2013	Brenda González	Santa Fe	
2014	Valentina Ferrer	Córdoba	
2015	Claudia Alexis Barrionuevo	Salta	
2016	Estefanía Bernal	Buenos Aires	Endemol Argentina and TNT Latin America directorship
2017	Stefanía Belén Incandela Lema	Buenos Aires	
2018	Agustina Belén Pivowarchuk	Buenos Aires	
2019	Mariana Jesica Varela	Buenos Aires Province	Osmel Sousa directorship
2020	Alina Luz Akselrad	Córdoba	Miss Sudamérica 2017
2021	María Julieta García	Buenos Aires	
2022	Bárbara Yasmín Cabrera	Buenos Aires	Nadia Cerri directorship
2023	Yamile Dajud	Río Negro Province	Kena Manzur directorship
2024	Magali Benejam	Córdoba	
2025	Aldana Masset	Entre Ríos	
2026	Tamara Rogouski	Misiones	

=== Statistic rankings ===
Province	Title	Year
Buenos Aires	21	1932, 1937, 1959, 1963, 1966, 1967, 1972, 1976, 1977, 1979, 1983, 1985, 1987, 1996, 2000, 2003, 2007, 2010, 2011, 2019, 2022
Distrito Federal	20	1954, 1956, 1957, 1960, 1961, 1965, 1968, 1970, 1973, 1974, 1982, 1984, 1986, 1988, 1992, 1997, 2009, 2016, 2017, 2018
Córdoba	8	1928, 1978, 1989, 1994, 1998, 2006, 2014, 2020, 2024
Santa Fe	8	1929, 1962, 1964, 1971, 1980, 1999, 2001, 2013
Chaco	3	1930, 1991, 1993
Entre Ríos	2	1955, 2025
Salta	2	1990, 2015
Tucumán	2	1975, 2012
Río Negro	1	2023
San Juan	1	2008
Santa Cruz	1	1981
Corrientes	1	1969
Misiones	1	1958

== Titleholders under Miss Argentina org. ==
- : Declared as Winner
- : Ended as runner-up or top 5/6 qualification
- : Ended as one of the finalists or semifinalists
- : Ended as special awards winner

Year	Province	Miss Universe Argentina	Placement at Miss Universe	Special Award(s)	Notes
2026	Misiones	Daiana Pereyra	TBA		
2026	Misiones	Tamara Rogouski	Resigned		
2025	Entre Ríos	Aldana Masset	Unplaced		
2024	Córdoba	Magali Benejam	Top 12		
2023	Río Negro	Yamile Luján Dajud	Unplaced		Keno Manzur directorship.
2022	Buenos Aires	Bárbara Yasmín Cabrera	Unplaced		Nadia Cerri directorship.
2021	Buenos Aires	María Julieta García	Unplaced		Appointed — Due to the impact of COVID-19 pandemic, the 1st Runner-up of 2019 crowned as the Miss Argentina 2021.
2020	Córdoba	Alina Luz Akselrad	Top 21		Appointed — Due to the impact of COVID-19 pandemic, the Top 7 of 2019 crowned as the Miss Argentina 2020.
2019	Buenos Aires	Mariana Jesica Varela	Unplaced		Osmel Sousa directorship.
2018	Buenos Aires	Agustina Belén Pivowarchuk	Unplaced		
2017	Buenos Aires	Stefanía Belén Incandela Lema	Unplaced		
2016	Buenos Aires	Estefanía Bernal	Unplaced		Endemol Argentina and TNT Latin America directorship.
2015	Salta	Claudia Alexis Barrionuevo	Unplaced	Best National Costume (Top 5)	
2014	Córdoba	Valentina Ferrer Pezza	Top 10	Best National Costume (Top 5)	
2013	Santa Fe	Brenda María González	Unplaced		
2012	Tucumán	Camila Solórzano Ayusa	Unplaced		
2011	Buenos Aires Province	Natalia Soledad Rodríguez	Unplaced		
2010	Buenos Aires Province	Yésica Natalia Di Vincenzo	Unplaced		
2009	Buenos Aires	Johanna Mariel Lašić Cid	Unplaced		
2008	San Juan	María Silvana Belli Vega	Unplaced		
2007	Buenos Aires Province	Daniela Alejandra Stucan Figlomeni	Unplaced		
2006	Córdoba	Magali Romitelli	Top 20		Mirta Schuster directorship.
Señorita Argentina
Did not compete between 2004—2005
2003	Buenos Aires Province	Laura Constanza Romero Demelli	Unplaced		
2002	Did not compete				
2001	Buenos Aires	Romina Incicco	Unplaced		
2000	Buenos Aires Province	Andrea Nicastri Muchi	Unplaced		Fenix Production and Fundación Favaloro directorship.
1999	Santa Fe	Elena Mabel Fournier Picciolo	Unplaced		
1998	Córdoba	Marcela Viviana Brane	Unplaced		
1997	Buenos Aires	Nazarena Vanesa González Almada	Unplaced		
1996	Buenos Aires Province	Verónica Ledezma	Unplaced		
1995	Did not compete				
1994	Córdoba	Solange Guadalupe Magnano Silvestre†	Unplaced		
1993	Chaco	Alicia Andrea Ramón	Unplaced		Nelly Raymond directorship.
Miss Argentina
1992	Buenos Aires	Laura Verónica Rafael	Unplaced		
1991	Chaco	Verónica Flavia Honnorat	Unplaced		
1990	Salta Province	Paola De La Torre	Unplaced		
1989	Córdoba	Luisa Norbis	Unplaced		
1988	Buenos Aires	Claudia Gabriela Pereyra	Unplaced		
1987	Buenos Aires Province	Carolina Brachetti	Unplaced		
1986	Buenos Aires	María De Los Ángeles Fernández	Unplaced		
1985	Buenos Aires Province	Yanina Castaño	Unplaced		
1984	Buenos Aires	Leida Adar	Unplaced		
1983	Buenos Aires Province	María Daniela Carara	Unplaced		
1982	Buenos Aires	María Alejandra Basile	Unplaced		
1981	Santa Cruz	Susana Mabel Reynoso	Unplaced		Juan Alberto Mateyko and Nelly Raymond Directorship
1980	Santa Fe	Silvia Piedrabuena	Unplaced		
1979	Buenos Aires Province	Adriana Virginia Álvarez	Top 12		El Mundo del Espectáculo directorship.
1978	Córdoba	Delia Stella Maris Muñoz	Unplaced		
1977	Buenos Aires Province	Maritza Elizabet Jurado	Top 12		
1976	Buenos Aires Province	Lilian Noemí De Asti	Top 12		
1975	Tucumán	Rosa Del Valle Santillán	Unplaced		
1974	Buenos Aires	Leonor Celmira Guggini	Unplaced		
1973	Buenos Aires	Susana Romero	Top 12		
1972	Buenos Aires Province	Norma Elena Dudik	Unplaced		
1971	Santa Fe	María Del Carmen Vidal	Unplaced		
1970	Buenos Aires	Beatriz Marta Gros	4th Runner-up	Best Swimsuit (Top 10)	Héctor Larrea directorship.
1969	Corrientes	Lidia Esther Pepe	Unplaced		
1968	Buenos Aires	María Del Carmen Jordan Vidal	Unplaced		
1967	Buenos Aires Province	Amalia Yolanda Scuffi	Unplaced		Naico Agency directorship.
1966	Buenos Aires Province	Elba Beatriz Basso	Unplaced		El Arte de la Elegancia directorship.
1965	Did not compete				
1964	Santa Fe	María Amelia Ramírez	Top 10		
1963	Buenos Aires Province	Olga Amelia Galluzzi	Top 15		
1962	Santa Fe	Norma Beatriz Nolan	Miss Universe 1962		
1961	Buenos Aires	Adriana Gardiazábal	2nd Runner-up		
1960	Buenos Aires	Rose Marie Lincke	Unplaced		
1959	Buenos Aires Province	Liana Cortijo	Unplaced		
1958	Misiones	Celina Mercedes Ayala	Unplaced		
1957	Buenos Aires	Mónica Lamas	Top 15		
1956	Buenos Aires	Ileana Carré	Top 15		
1955	Entre Ríos	Hilda Isabel Sarli Gorrindo †	Top 15		
1954	Buenos Aires	Ivana Olga Ana María Francisca Kislinger	Top 16		Mundo Redial Production directorship.

== See also ==
- Belleza Argentina
