= Sebastián Brusco =

Argentine footballer

Personal information
- Full name: José Sebastián Brusco
- Date of birth: October 8, 1974 (age 52)
- Place of birth: Villa María, Argentina
- Height: 1.85 m (6 ft 1 in)
- Position: Centre back

Senior career*
Years	Team	Apps	(Gls)
1993–1996	Belgrano de Córdoba	71	(7)
1997–1998	Racing Club	41	(6)
1999	Toros Neza	4	(0)
1999–2000	Godoy Cruz	26	(9)
2000–2001	Instituto de Córdoba	36	(2)
2001–2002	Belgrano de Córdoba	31	(5)
2002–2003	Gimnasia de La Plata	17	(0)
2003–2005	Belgrano de Córdoba	64	(2)
2005–2006	Blooming	32	(1)
2006–2008	San Martín (SJ)	63	(15)
2008–2009	Independiente Rivadavia	32	(0)
- * Club domestic league appearances and goals

José Sebastián Brusco (born October 8, 1974) is a formed Argentine football defender.

Brusco was born in Villa María, Córdoba. He started his professional playing career in 1993 with Belgrano de Córdoba. In 1996, he joined Racing Club de Avellaneda

In 1999, he had a short spell with Toros Neza in Mexico before returning to Argentina to play for Godoy Cruz and then Instituto de Córdoba in the 2nd division.

In 2001 Brusco returned to Belgrano de Córdoba before moving to Gimnasia y Esgrima de La Plata. In 2003, he returned for a 3rd spell with Belgrano de Córdoba where he stayed until 2005.

In 2005 Brusco joined Bolivian side Blooming and won the Apertura tournament that same year. The following season he was signed by San Martín de San Juan with which later gained promotion to the Argentine Primera after defeating Huracán on a 3-2 aggregated. After a couple of years with San Martín, Brusco changed colors by joining Independiente Rivadavia.

== Club titles ==
Season	Team	Title
2005 (A)	Blooming	Liga de Fútbol Profesional Boliviano
