= Delirio de Grandeza =

Delirio de Grandeza (Spanish for "delusion of grandeur") may refer to:

- "Delirio de Grandeza", a song by Avalanch from El Ángel Caído
- "Delirio de Grandeza", a song by Justo Betancourt
  - "Delirio de Grandeza", a cover by Rosalía from Motomami
- "Delirio de Grandeza", a song by Bobby Valentín

== See also ==
- Delirio (disambiguation)
