= Valentina Ferrer =

Argentine model (born 1993)

- Ferrer at the 27th Annual Latin Grammy Awards, 2026
- Born: 19 September 1993 (age 33); Córdoba, Argentina
- Height: 1.78 m (5 ft 10 in)
- Children: 1
- Beauty pageant titleholder
- Title: Miss Argentina 2014
- Hair color: Blonde
- Eye color: Hazel
- Major competitions: Miss Córdoba 2014 (Winner); Miss Argentina 2014 (Winner); Miss Universe 2014 (Top 10)

Valentina Ferrer (born 19 September 1993) is an Argentine actress, model, TV host and beauty pageant titleholder who was crowned Miss Argentina 2014 and represented her country at the Miss Universe 2014 pageant.

As a model, she is represented by agents in Buenos Aires, Mexico City, Miami, and Brazil. She has walked runways for Funkshion Fashion Week, Mercedes Benz Fashion Week, and Miami Fashion Week, sharing runways with Miss Universe 2013, Gabriela Isler, and Miss Universe 2008, Dayana Mendoza.

As an actress, she is known for Betty en NY (2019), In 2017, she appeared in Enrique Iglesias's music video "Messing Around." In May of that year, she starred in J. Balvin's music video "Sigo Extrañándote".

== Early life ==
Valentina Ferrer was born in Córdoba, Argentina, the middle child of five children born to José Luis Ferrer and Alejandra Pezza. From a young age, Ferrer displayed a passion for sports and the outdoors, particularly excelling in basketball and water sports. Her interest in fitness led her to study personal training, aligning with her long-standing commitment to health and wellness.

== Miss Argentina 2014 ==
=== Miss Argentina 2014 and the Miss Universe Competition ===
She was crowned Miss Argentina 2014 at the pageant held on October 10, 2014, as part of the International Tourism Fair in Hall Frers La Rural in Palermo, Buenos Aires. She represented Argentina in the Miss Universe 2014 pageant on January 25, 2015, in Doral, Florida, USA. In that pageant, she was placed in the Top 10, ending Argentina's eight-year drought of placements, and finished in the top five in the National Costume competition.

== Modeling career ==
Ferrer has agents in New York, Buenos Aires, Mexico City, Miami, Brazil, and some places in Europe. She has walked the runway at major fashion events including New York Fashion Week, Paris Fashion Week, Milan Fashion Week, Miami Fashion Week, Mercedes-Benz Fashion Week, and Funkshion Fashion Week.

Ferrer has modelled clothes made by globally renowned fashion houses and designers. She has also appeared on the covers of magazines including Harper’s Bazaar, Rolling Stone, Marie Clare, Vogue and Women’s Health.

== Personal life ==
Valentina Ferrer began dating Colombian singer J Balvin in 2018, after the two met on the set of his music video for "Sigo Extrañándote". In April 2021, Ferrer and Balvin announced their pregnancy in Vogue Mexico. Their son, Río, was born in June 2021. In September 2026, the couple confirmed the end of their relationship.

Awards and achievements
Preceded by Brenda González	Miss Argentina; 2014	Succeeded by Claudia Barrionuevo
