= Miss Universe 1973 =

22nd Miss Universe pageant

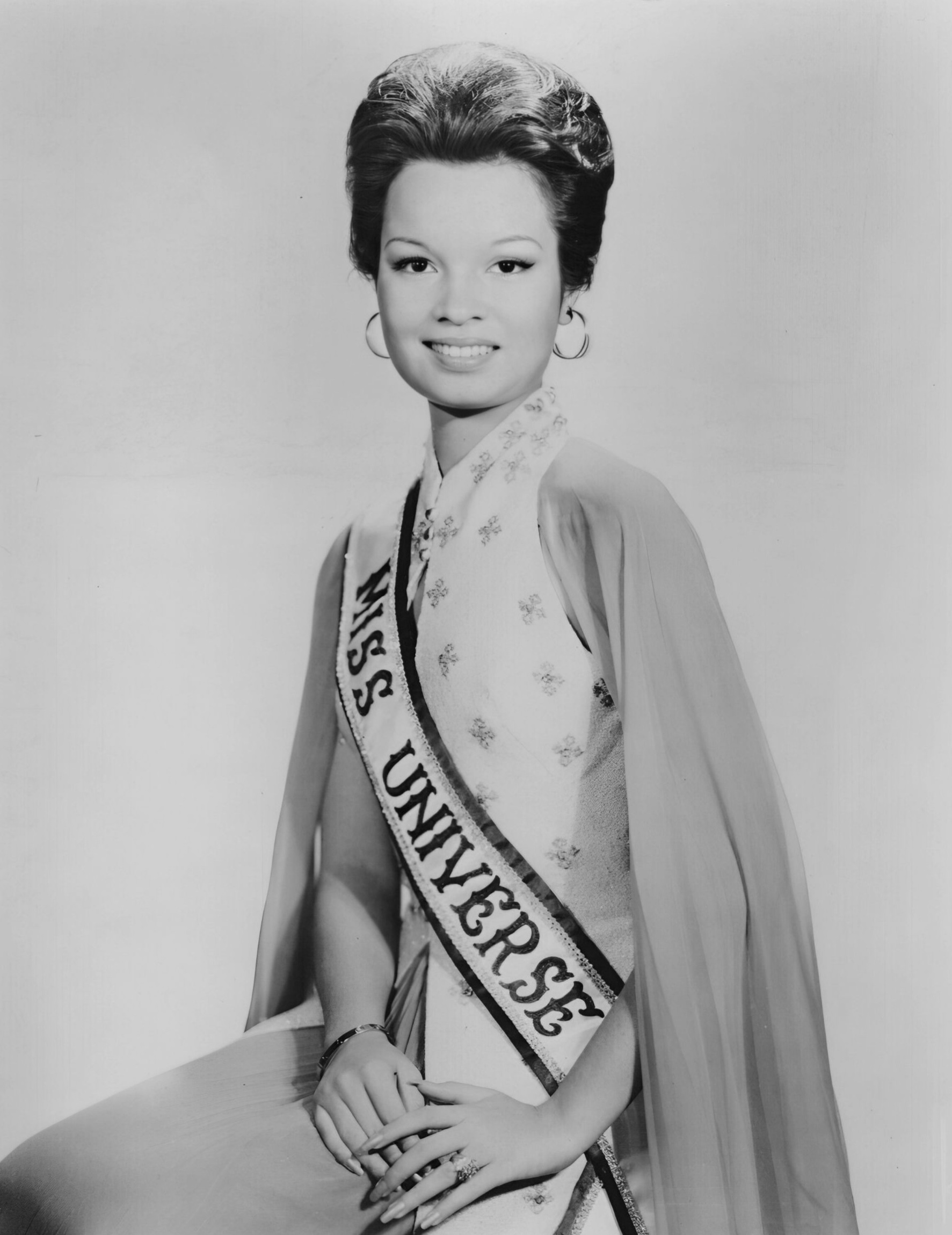
- Margarita Moran
- Date: 21 July 1973 (Note: The event was televised live at 08:00 pm local time (UTC+02:00) in various broadcasters around the world. For the United States, it was tape delayed to make way for the primetime broadcast.)
- Presenters: Bob Barker
- Venue: Odeon of Herodes Atticus, Athens, Greece
- Broadcaster: CBS (international); EIRT (official broadcaster)
- Entrants: 61
- Placements: 12
- Debuts: Cyprus
- Withdrawals: Bahamas; Ecuador; Iceland; Iraq; Peru; Zaire
- Returns: Ceylon; Lebanon; Nicaragua; Panama; Trinidad and Tobago
- Winner: Margarita Moran; Philippines
- Congeniality: Jeanette Robertson (Chile)
- Best National Costume: Rocío Martín (Spain)
- Photogenic: Margarita Moran (Philippines)

Miss Universe 1973 was the 22nd Miss Universe pageant, held at the Odeon of Herodes Atticus in Athens, Greece, on 21 July 1973. This was the first Miss Universe event to be held in Europe.

At the conclusion of the event, Kerry Anne Wells of Australia crowned Margarita Moran of the Philippines as Miss Universe 1973. It is the second victory for the Philippines in the pageant's history.

Contestants from sixty-one countries and territories participated in this year's pageant. The pageant was hosted by Bob Barker in his seventh consecutive year, while Helen O'Connell provided commentary and analysis throughout the event.

== Background ==
=== Location and date ===
In February 1973, Puerto Rican government officials announced that they would be ending the $1 million contract to bring Miss Universe and Miss USA to the island until 1976. Officials said the agreement was illegal, and Miss Universe President Harold Glasser said it was only a technical-legal nature. According to Glasser, the real reason the agreement was terminated was because "pageants are victims of political infighting" and pageant sponsors have remained neutral in the debate over Puerto Rico's political status. The pro-statehood administration of Gov. Luis A. Ferre signed the contract to sponsor the pageants, but an anti-statehood administration led by Gov. Rafael Hernandez Colon took office on January 2. Although the search for a venue for Miss Universe is still ongoing, the pageant will still push through on July 21, according to Glasser.

On February 22, Miss Universe Inc. filed a $20 million USD damage suit against the government of Puerto Rico for canceling its contract to sponsor the competition for five years.

On May 10, the Miss Universe Inc. announced that the 22nd edition would be held in Athens from July 11 to July 21. According to Glasser and Chrysanthos Demetriadis, president of the Greek National Tourist Organization, the competition will be broadcast in more than 30 countries.

=== Selection of participants ===
Contestants from sixty-one countries and territories were selected to compete in the pageant.

==== Debuts, returns, and, withdrawals ====
This edition saw the debut of Cyprus, and the returns of Ceylon, which last competed in 1970; and Lebanon, Nicaragua, Panama, and Trinidad and Tobago which last competed in 1971.

Cyprianna Munnings of the Bahamas withdrew in order to join the celebration of her country's independence from the United Kingdom. Katrin Gisladóttir of Iceland withdrew for health reasons. Mary Núñez of Peru was not allowed by her government to participate due to the weak diplomatic relations with the United States and Peru. Ecuador, Iraq, and Zaire withdrew from the competition after their respective organizations failed to hold a national competition or appoint a delegate.

== Results ==
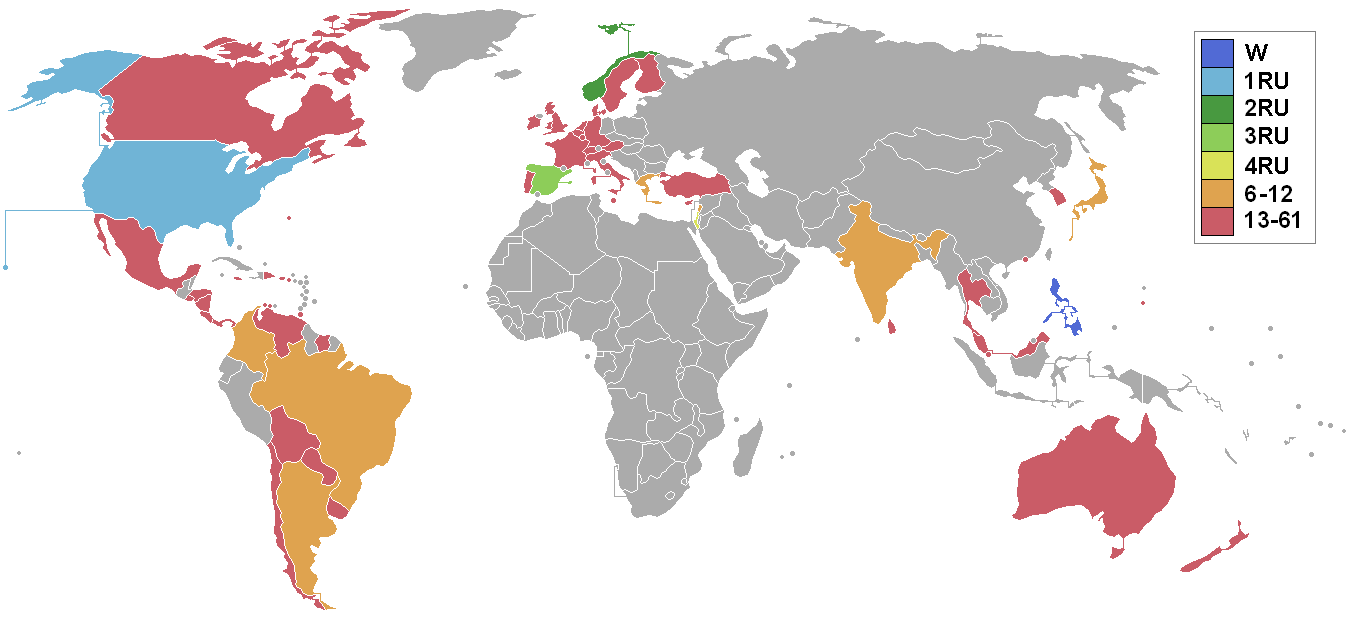
Miss Universe 1973 participating countries and territories.

=== Placements ===
Placement	Contestant
Miss Universe 1973	Philippines – Margarita Moran
1st Runner-Up	United States – Amanda Jones
2nd Runner-Up	Norway – Aina Walle
3rd Runner-Up	Spain – Rocío Martín
4th Runner-Up	Israel – Limor Shreibman
Top 12	Argentina – Susana Romero; Brazil – Sandra Ferreira; Colombia – Ana Agudelo; Greece – Vana Papadaki; India – Farzana Habib; Japan – Miyoko Sometani; Lebanon – Marcelle Herro

=== Special awards ===
Award	Contestant
Miss Photogenic	Philippines – Margarita Moran
Miss Amity	Chile – Wendy Robertson
Best National Costume	Spain – Rocío Martín

== Pageant ==
=== Format ===
Same with 1971, twelve semi-finalists were chosen at the preliminary competition that consists of the swimsuit and evening gown competition. The twelve semi-finalists participated in the casual interview, swimsuit, and evening gown competitions. Because the Greek Archaeological Society did not allow the candidates to parade in their swimsuits at the Odeon of Herodes Atticus, this edition's swimsuit competition was held outside the odeon. From twelve, five finalists were shortlisted to advance to the final interview.

=== Selection committee ===
- Jean-Pierre Aumont – French actor
- Horst Buchholz – German actor
- El Cordobés – Spanish bullfighter
- Walt Frazier – American basketball player
- Apasra Hongsakula – Miss Universe 1965 from Thailand
- Herakles Mathiopoulos – Chairman of the chamber of hotels in Greece
- Hanae Mori – Japanese fashion designer
- Lynn Redgrave – British-American actress
- Ginger Rogers – American actress and singer
- Edilson Cid Varela – Brazilian journalist
- Earl Wilson – American columnist and journalist

== Contestants ==
Sixty-one contestants competed for the title.

Country/Territory	Contestant	Age (Note: Ages at the time of the pageant)	Hometown
Argentina	Susana Romero	20	Buenos Aires
(Netherlands Antilles) Aruba	Ethline Oduber	18	Oranjestad
Australia	Susan Mainwaring	22	Brisbane
Austria	Roswitha Kobald	18	Styria
Belgium	Christiane Devisch	20	Antwerp
Bermuda	Judy Richards	19	Hamilton
Bolivia	Roxana Sittic	18	Santa Cruz de la Sierra
Brazil	Sandra Ferreira	21	São Paulo
Canada	Deborah Ducharme	20	Ontario
Chile	Jeanette Robertson	18	Santiago
Colombia	Ana Agudelo	20	Valle del Cauca
Costa Rica	Rosario Mora	18	Alajuela
(Netherlands Antilles) Curaçao	Ingerborg Zielinski	18	Willemstad
Cyprus	Johanna Melaniodos	18	Nicosia
Denmark	Anette Grankvist	20	Copenhagen
Dominican Republic	Liliana Fernández	18	Salcedo
El Salvador	Gloria Ivette Romero	–	San Salvador
England	Veronica Ann Cross	23	London
Finland	Raija Stark	20	Helsinki
France	Isabelle Krumacker	18	Lorraine
Greece	Vana Papadaki	19	Athens
Guam	Beatrice Benito	18	Agana
Holland	Monique Borgeld	23	Amsterdam
Honduras	Nelly Suyapa González	17	El Paraíso
Hong Kong	Elaine Sung	18	Hong Kong
India	Farzana Habib	18	New Delhi
Ireland	Pauline Fitzsimons	20	Dublin
Israel	Limor Shreibman	19	Tel Aviv
Italy	Antonella Barci	18	Milan
Jamaica	Reta Faye Chambers	20	Saint James
Japan	Miyoko Sometani	22	Ibaraki
Lebanon	Marcelle Herro	21	Beirut
Luxembourg	Lydia Maes	18	Esch-sur-Alzette
Malaysia	Margaret Loo	19	Cheras
Malta	Marthese Vigar	20	Msida
Mexico	Rossana Villares	18	Yucatán
New Zealand	Pamela King	20	Auckland
Nicaragua	Ana Cecilia Saravia	18	Leon
Norway	Aina Walle	20	Oslo
Panama	Jeanine Lizuaín	26	Panama City
Paraguay	Teresita María Cano	20	Concepción
Philippines	Margarita Moran	19	Manila
Portugal	Carla Barros	20	Lisbon
Puerto Rico	Gladys Colón	18	Orocovis
Scotland	Caroline Meade	18	Glasgow
Singapore	Debra de Souza	19	Singapore
South Korea	Young-joo Kim	18	Seoul
Spain	Rocío Martín	19	Seville
Sri Lanka	Shiranthi Wickremesinghe	20	Badulla
Suriname	Yvonne Ma Ajong	18	Paramaribo
Sweden	Monica Sundin	20	Stockholm
Switzerland	Barbara Schöttli	19	Zürich
Thailand	Kanok-orn Phowma	20	Chachoengsao
Trinidad and Tobago	Camella King	25	San Fernando
Turkey	Yildiz Arhan	–	Istanbul
United States	Amanda Jones	22	Evanston
United States Virgin Islands	Cindy Richards	19	Saint Croix
Uruguay	Yolanda Ferrari	21	Montevideo
Venezuela	Desirée Rolando	18	Carabobo
Wales	Deirdre Greenland	23	Newport
West Germany	Dagmar Winkler	18	Bavaria
