= Miss Universo Argentina 2016 =

- Date: November 6, 2016
- Presenters: Horacio Cabak
- Entertainment: Miranda!; Mike Amigorena
- Broadcaster: TNT Latin America
- Entrants: 16
- Placements: 6
- Winner: Estefania Bernal; Buenos Aires

Miss Universe Argentina 2016 was the Miss Universe Argentina pageant, held on November 6, 2016.

Claudia Barrionuevo crowned Estefanía Bernal at end of the event. Bernal represented Argentina at Miss Universe 2016 pageant.

== Results ==
=== Placements ===
Placement	Contestant
Miss Universe Argentina 2016	Buenos Aires – Estefania Bernal
1st Runner-Up	Tucumán – Priscila Carello
2nd Runner-Up	Salta – Celeste Abigail Jorge
Top 6	Chaco – Felicitas Castro Lopez; Córdoba – Pamela Roberts; Santa Fe – Tatiana Moreno

== Contestants ==
sixteen contestants competed for the title.

Contestant	Age	Province	Hometown
Ana Paula Almada	19	Santa Fe	Reconquista
Anabella Longarini	21	Buenos Aires	Veinticinco de Mayo
Celina Bessone	22	Córdoba	Corral de Bustos
Celeste Abigail Jorge	19	Salta	Salta
Estefanía Bernal	20	Buenos Aires	Buenos Aires
Felicitas Castro Lopez	20	Chaco	Charata
Florencia Melanie De Palo	19	Buenos Aires	San Antonio de Padua
Floriana Hoffmann	20	Santa Cruz	El Calafate
Judith Irusta	24	Buenos Aires	Buenos Aires
Lucia Lujan Barreto	22	Chaco	Resistencia
Luisina Aldana Pillet	19	Córdoba	Cruz Alta
Mariana Jesica Varela	20	Buenos Aires	Burzaco
Natalia Marianela Chamorro	26	Buenos Aires	Buenos Aires
Pamela Roberts	20	Córdoba	Córdoba
Priscila Carello	25	Tucumán	San Miguel de Tucumán
Tatiana María Moreno	21	Santa Fe	Funes

== Judges ==
- Magazine Caras Manageress, Liliana Castaño.
- Blogger, Constanza Crotto.
- Blogger, Mariana Gándara.
- Argentine Designer, Benito Fernández.
- Former soccer player, former model and current Argentinean television actor and conductor, Sergio Goycochea.
- Argentina Model, Luli Fernández.

== Miss Universo Uruguay 2016 ==
Because Endemol Argentina and TNT Latinoamerica obtained the Miss Universe franchise for Uruguay and Argentina, they decided to carry out the election of the Uruguayan representative to Miss Universe during a special segment of Miss Universo Argentina.

=== Final results ===
Final results	Contestant
Miss Universo Uruguay 2016	Magdalena Cohendet
1st Runner-up	Romina Coll
2nd Runner-up	Ariana Silva
Top 6	Anyi Casanova; Sabrina Langoni; Serrana Soler

=== Delegates ===
The 6 official delegates were selected on several castings.

Name	Age	Hometown
Romina Coll	20	Canelones
Serrana Soler	24	Montevideo
Sabrina Langoni	26	Montevideo
Magdalena Cohendet	19	Artigas
Ariana Silva	19	Montevideo
Anyi Casanova	21	Lavalleja

== See also ==
- Miss Universe Argentina 2011
