= Camila Solórzano =

Argentine beauty pageant titleholder (born 1989)

Camila Solórzano Ayusa
- Born: Camila Solórzano Ayusa; August 16, 1989 (age 37); San Miguel de Tucumán, Argentina
- Height: 1.79 m (5 ft 10 1/2 in)
- Beauty pageant titleholder
- Title: Miss Argentina 2012
- Hair color: Black
- Major competitions: Miss Earth 2008 (Unplaced); Miss Argentina 2012 (Winner); Miss Universe 2012 (Unplaced)

Camila Solórzano Ayusa (born August 16, 1989 in San Miguel de Tucumán) is an Argentine beauty pageant titleholder who was crowned Miss Argentina 2012 and was represented her country at the Miss Universe 2012 pageant.

== Miss Earth 2008 ==
Camila represented her country at the Miss Earth 2008 pageant in the Philippines.

== Miss Argentina 2012 ==
Camila Solorzano, from Tucumán, was crowned Miss Universo Argentina 2012 during an event held on November 6. Camila, who is 23 years of age, She stands 179 cm tall and travelled to Las Vegas, Nevada, USA in December for the 2012 Miss Universe competition.

== Miss Universe 2012 ==
She represented Argentina in Miss Universe 2012 held in Las Vegas but did not place in the semifinals.

Awards and achievements
| Preceded by Natalia Rodríguez | Miss Argentina; 2012 | Succeeded by Brenda González |
