= Margie Moran =

Filipina beauty queen, model, and peace advocate

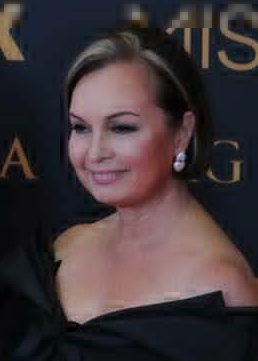
- Moran in 2017
- Born: Maria Margarita Roxas Moran; 15 September 1953 (age 73); Manila, Philippines
- Education: Degree in Business Administration; Masters in Development Management
- Alma mater: Maryknoll College; Boston University; SOAS University of London
- Height: 5 ft 6 in (1.68 m)
- Spouse: Antonio R. Floirendo Jr. (separated)
- Children: 2
- Beauty pageant titleholder
- Title: Binibining Pilipinas Universe 1973; Miss Universe 1973
- Hair color: Dark Brown
- Eye color: Brown
- Major competitions: Binibining Pilipinas 1973; (Winner – Binibining Pilipinas Universe 1973); Miss Universe 1973; (Winner); (Miss Photogenic)

Chairperson of the Cultural Center of the Philippines
- In office January 5, 2018 – June 30, 2022
- President: Rodrigo Duterte
- Preceded by: Emily Abrera
- Succeeded by: Jaime C. Laya

Maria Margarita "Margie" Roxas Moran-Floirendo (Tagalog: [ˈmaɾdʒi mɔˈɾan]; born 15 September 1953) is a Filipino model, actress, socialite, peace advocate, and beauty queen who was the president of Ballet Philippines, and previously served as chairperson of the Cultural Center of the Philippines.

Moran is best known for winning the second Miss Universe crown for the Philippines as Miss Universe 1973.

== Family and education ==
Maria Margarita Roxas Moran was born on 15 September 1953 in Manila, Philippines, to lawyer Francis Gonzalez Morán and art collector-socialite Rosario McIlvain Roxas, one of three children born to Juanita Muriedas McIlvain and Manuel Roxas, fifth president of the Philippines. Her mother's siblings were Consuelo Roxas-Javellana and Manuel "Manny" Roxas Jr.

Margie's father Francis was the son of Chief Justice Manuel Morán and Nieves Gonzalez-Morán, granddaughter of Don Francisco Gonzalez y Reinado, owner of the 39,000-hectare Hacienda Esperanza that covered the municipalities of Santa Maria, Santo Tomas, Rosales and San Quintin, extending through the rest of Pangasinan and the provinces of Tarlac and Nueva Ecija.

Margie Moran graduated high school from St. Theresa's College and attended college at Maryknoll College, now Miriam College. Moran holds a degree in business administration from Boston University, and a masters in development management from SOAS University of London.

== Miss Universe 1973 ==
Moran won the right to represent the Philippines in the Miss Universe 1973 competition in Athens, Greece, after winning the Binibining Pilipinas competition in 1973. Moran said that she entered the contest from the incessant urgings of friends and family. Then 19 years old and at 5 ft 6 in, Moran went on to win the Miss Universe 1973 title and also garnered the Miss Photogenic award. She is one of only four Miss Universe winners to also win Miss Photogenic; the others being Margareta Arvidsson, Janelle Commissiong, and Denise Quiñones.

== Life after Miss Universe ==
Two years after her reign, Moran managed to finish her Business Administration degree from Maryknoll College and married Antonio Floirendo Jr at 21. She pursued further studies at Boston University, and completed her master's degree at the federal University of London. She headed several private companies including the Pearl Farm resort on Samal Island, Davao del Norte from 1989 to 1994, then hosted Margie on Mindanao on television from 1998 to 2003. Moran produced the multi-awarded film Bagong Buwan. She is also notable for her social and civic works especially for promoting peace and livelihood as part of the Mindanao Commission on Women Organization, and recently as an ambassador-trustee of Habitat for Humanity Philippines.

Her passion and experience as a dancer since the age of 18, prompted her to promote arts and culture with Southern Philippines Foundation for the Arts, Culture and Ecology. She ran the overall operations of Ballet Philippines as its president from 2009 to 2018. In January 2018, Moran was appointed by President Rodrigo Duterte as member of the Board of Trustees of the Cultural Center of the Philippines. She was elected as the cultural agency's chairperson in April 2018.

Her husband, also known as "Tonyboy" would later serve as representative of Davao del Norte's 2nd district. They decided to live separately after 30 years of marriage. They have two daughters, Monica Danielle and Gabrielle Antoinette.

== Filmography ==
=== Film ===
Year	Title	Role	Company
1974	Oh Margie Oh	"Margie"	VL Productions, Inc.
2001	Bagong Buwan	Producer	Bahaghari Productions; Star Cinema
2017	Last Night	"Mama" - Mark's mother	Star Cinema; Spring Films; N^{2} Productions

=== Television ===
Year	Title	Role	Network
1997–2004	Margie on Mindanao	Host	ABS-CBN

== See also ==
- Gloria Diaz
- Pia Wurtzbach
- Catriona Gray
- Binibining Pilipinas
- Philippines at Major Beauty Pageants

Awards and achievements
Preceded by (Australia) Kerry Anne Wells	Miss Universe; 1973	Succeeded by (Spain) Amparo Muñoz (Resigned) †
Preceded by Barbara Crespo	Binibining Pilipinas Universe; 1973	Succeeded by Guadalupe Sanchez
Political offices
Preceded by Emily Abrera	Chairperson of the Cultural Center of the Philippines; 2018–present	Incumbent
