= Bárbara Cabrera =

Argentine fashion model (born 1996)

Barbara Cabrera
- Born: Barbara Yasmin Cabrera; 12 August 1996 (age 30); Buenos Aires, Argentina
- Occupations: Model; beauty pageant titleholder
- Beauty pageant titleholder
- Major competitions: Miss Universe Argentina 2022 (Appointed); Miss Universe 2022 (Unplaced)

Barbara Yasmin Cabrera (born 12 August 1996) is an Argentine fashion model and beauty pageant titleholder who was appointed Miss Universe Argentina 2022 and represented Argentina at Miss Universe 2022.

== Early life ==
Barbara Cabrera was born and raised in Buenos Aires. She began her modeling career at the academy of the former model Anamá Ferreira and was selected at the age of 18 to represent the province of Buenos Aires in the Miss Universe Argentina 2018 pageant, remaining a finalist.

== Career ==
At age 20 she moved to Panama, where she joined the Panama Talents agency. She paraded in the fashion week in Panama 2017 and in different campaigns and parades in Latin America, returning to Argentina to join the agency Multitalent, being selected by the Catalan designer Custo Dalmau for the closing of the event "Custo Barcelona" in the framework of the New York Fashion Week 2020.

As a graphic model, she was on the cover of several magazines, such as Gente and Marie Claire.
