= Dancing (film) =

1933 film

- Directed by: Luis Moglia Barth
- Written by: Alejandro Berrutti; Luis Moglia Barth
- Starring: Arturo García Buhr; Amanda Ledesma; Alicia Vignoli
- Cinematography: Alberto Biasotti
- Production company: Argentina Sono Film
- Distributed by: Argentina Sono Film
- Release date: 9 November 1933
- Running time: 82 minutes
- Country: Argentina
- Language: Spanish

Dancing is a 1933 Argentine musical film directed by Luis Moglia Barth for Argentina Sono Film. The film's sets were designed by the art director Juan Manuel Concado. It is based on a play by Alejandro Berrutti. It was the second ever sound film to be released by the studio after Barth's ¡Tango! (earlier in 1933), which inaugurated the classical-industrial period of Argentine cinema. It marked the debut of Amelia Bence, who had a minor role.

== Cast ==
- Arturo García Buhr
- Amanda Ledesma
- Alicia Vignoli
- Tito Lusiardo
- Alicia Barrié
- Severo Fernández
- Pedro Quartucci
- Héctor Calcaño
- Héctor Quintanilla
- Eduardo Sandrini
- Margarita Padín
- Domingo Mania
- Paquita Garzón
- Rosa Catá
- Amelia Bence
- Elena Zucotti
- René Cóspito
- Roberto Firpo
- Los de la Raza
- Arturo Bamio

== Bibliography ==
- Rist, Peter H. Historical Dictionary of South American Cinema. Rowman & Littlefield, 2014.
