= The Rigorous Fate =

1985 film

- Directed by: Gerardo Vallejo
- Written by: Gerardo Vallejo
- Produced by: Luis A. Sartor
- Starring: Alberto Benegas
- Cinematography: Yito Blanc
- Release dates: July 1985 (Moscow); 29 August 1985 (Argentina)
- Running time: 100 minutes
- Country: Argentina
- Language: Spanish

The Rigorous Fate (Spanish: El rigor del destino), also released as The Sternness of Fate, is a 1985 Argentine drama-historical film written and directed by Gerardo Vallejo. It stars Carlos Carella, Víctor Laplace, Leonor Manso, and Ana María Picchio. The film was released on August 29, 1985, and was awarded the Golden Columbus Award at the Ibero-American Film Festival of Huelva that same year. It was entered into the 14th Moscow International Film Festival.

== Summary ==
The reunion of a child from Tucumán with his grandfather leads him to uncover the history of his father, a prominent workers' lawyer and advocate for social justice.

== Cast ==
- Alberto Benegas
- Carlos Carella
- Fred Carneano
- Víctor Laplace
- Leonor Manso
- Ana María Picchio
- Susana Romero
