= Panchito Cao =

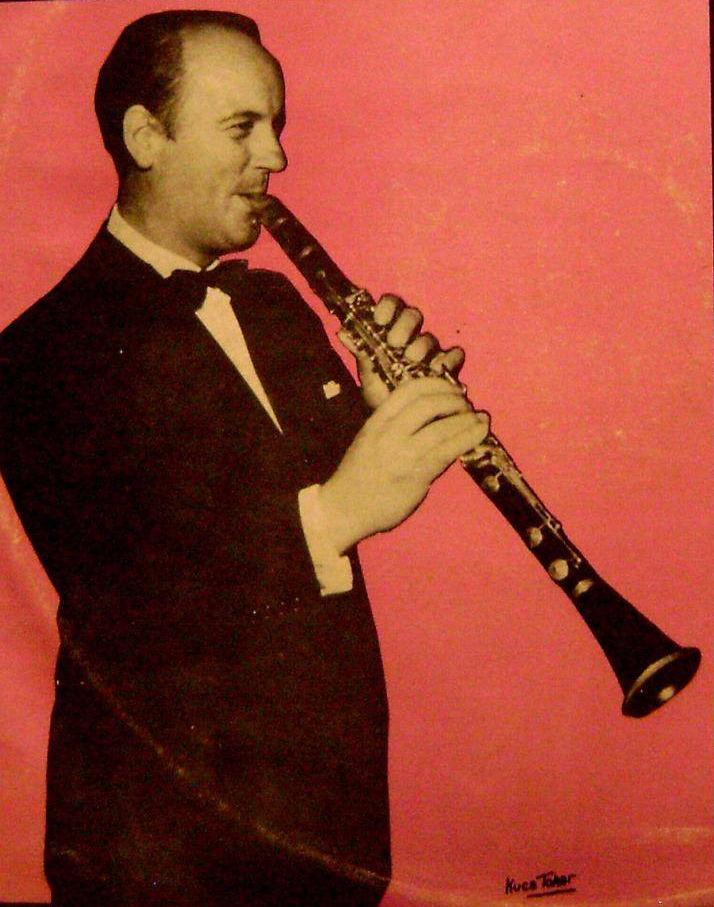
- Panchito Cao

Background information
- Also known as: Manian Kalik
- Born: Francisco Cao Vázquez; December 3, 1920; Buenos Aires, Argentina
- Died: September 14, 1979 (aged 58)
- Genre: Jazz
- Occupations: Musician, composer
- Instrument: Piano
- Years active: 1940–1979

Francisco Cao Vázquez, better known by his stage name Panchito Cao (3 December 1920 – 14 September 1979), was an Argentine clarinetist, conductor, and composer.

== Early life ==
Panchito Cao was born in the San Telmo neighborhood in Buenos Aires, Argentina. His parents were Benita Rosario Vázquez and Francisco Cao, both from Orense, who had four children, three of whom were boys and musicians: the aforementioned Panchito, Manuel (Buenos Aires, February 26, 1922 – Buenos Aires, April 9, 1991), who used the pseudonym Nolo and played the clarinet, and Antonio, who was also a clarinetist and died young. The father was a bagpiper and led the Cao Bagpipe Ensemble, in which his children also played.

== Professional career ==
Panchito was a prominent jazz clarinetist in various orchestras and performed alongside the vedette and dancer Josephine Baker.

In the 1940s, he formed a jazz ensemble in which musicians such as Hernán Oliva, Horacio Malvicino, Ahmed Ratip, René Cospito, and Barry Moral participated on various occasions. His groups performed in venues such as the Jockey Club, where Osvaldo Fresedo's orchestra also played.

In 1943, he formed the Santa Anita Sextet with Juan Salazar on trumpet, Chino Ibarra on tenor saxophone, "Mono" Villegas on piano, Tito Krieg on bass, and Adolfo Castro on drums.

He made an appearance on the Argentine big screen in the 1949 film Otra cosa es con guitarra, directed by Antonio Ber Ciani and written by César Tiempo, alongside Roberto Quiroga.

In 1946, he joined the Great Argentine Revue Company led by Alberto Castillo, with whom he presented shows such as Los cien barrios porteños, Dove está la papa, and Su majestad la cola at the Teatro Maipo.

In 1958, he directed the trio Los Muchachos de Antes alongside Horacio Malvicino on guitar and Aldo Nicolini on double bass, where he adopted the tango La payanca as his signature piece, helping to popularize it. With this group, he performed dozens of tangos for over two decades, aiming to recreate the style of similar ensembles from early 20th-century Buenos Aires.

He composed pieces such as Los muchachos de antes, Cuna de oro, El camorreo, Los ché, among others.

Panchito Cao died on September 14, 1979, at the age of 59. He is survived by his daughters, Beatriz and Inés.

== Films ==
- 1949: Otra cosa es con guitarra.

== TV ==
- 1970: Volviendo a vivir el Tango.

== Theatre ==
- 1946: Los cien barrios porteños.
- 1946: Dove está la papa.
- 1946: Su majestad la cola.
- 1964: Solo para mayores.
- 1966: Las wifanas, junto a José Marrone.

== Songs played ==
- La payanca (1958)
- Armenonville
- Canaro en París
- Don Juan (1975)
- La viruta
- El porteñito
- Milonga del 900
- La vieja serenata
- El esquinazo
- Tiempos viejos
- El africano
- El choclo
- Olga
- La tablada
- Che Bartolo
- El aeroplano (vals)
- Santiago del Estero
- Corrales viejos
- El acuarelista
- La polea del Cachafaz
- La mentirosa
- Más allá del sol
- La guitarrita
- Rodríguez Peña
