= Miss Universe Argentina 2011 =

- Date: July 4, 2011
- Presenters: Teodelina de Carabassa; Gustavo López
- Venue: Palacio Alsina, Carlos Pellegrini City, Buenos Aires, Argentina
- Entrants: 24
- Placements: 3
- Winner: Natalia Rodríguez; Capital Federal

Miss Universe Argentina 2011 pageant was held at the Palacio Alsina in Buenos Aires, Argentina, on 4 July 2011.

At the end of the event, Natalia Rodríguez was crowned Miss Universe Argentina 2011. She represented Argentina at Miss Universe 2011, held in São Paulo, Brazil.

== Results ==
=== Placements ===
Placement	Contestant
Miss Universe Argentina	Capital Federal – Natalia Rodríguez
1st Runner-Up	Misiones – Denisee Seewald
2nd Runner-Up	Santiago del Estero – Carolina Yanuzzi

== Delegates ==
There were 24 official contestants, one for each province.

Contestant	Province
Natalia Rodriguez	Capital Federal
Maria Paz Delgado	Buenos Aires
	Catamarca
Estefania Marcon	Chaco
Barbara Saavedra	Chubut
Guiliana Felippa	Córdoba
Gabriela Lopez	Corrientes
Ivana Romani	Entre Ríos
	Formosa
Alba Quintar	Jujuy
Yanel Alumine Lazo	La Pampa
Estefania Alonso	La Rioja
Maria Destefanis Aveiro	Mendoza
Denisee Seewald	Misiones
Ariana Rodriguez	Neuquén
Gisella Villagra	Río Negro
	Salta
Maria Yañez	San Juan
Ginette Camoriano	San Luis
Silvina Diaz Bustamante	Santa Cruz
Celeste Berron	Santa Fe
Carolina Yanuzzi	Santiago del Estero
Ornella De Bueno	Tierra del Fuego
Yanina Lontoya	Tucumán

== Judges ==
The following persons judged the final competition

- Mirtha Legrand (President of Judge)
- Yesica Di Vincenzo (Miss Argentina 2010)
- Evelyn Sheild (Miss Argentina)
- Adriana Salgueiro (Miss Argentina 1978)
- Ingrid Grudke (Queen of Queens in Missions)
- Daniel Félix (Plastic Surgeon)
- Karina Ravena (Dermatologist of the Misses)
- Juan Poccard (TRESemmé).

== See also ==
- Miss Universo Argentina 2016
