= Solange Magnano =

Argentine model (1971–2009)

- Born: December 2, 1971; Córdoba, Argentina
- Died: November 29, 2009 (aged 37); Buenos Aires, Argentina
- Children: 2
- Beauty pageant titleholder
- Title: Miss Argentina 1994
- Major competitions: Miss Argentina 1994 (Winner); Miss Universe 1994 (Unplaced)

Solange Magnano (2 December 1971 – November 29, 2009) was an Argentine model and beauty pageant titleholder who was crowned Miss Argentina 1994 and represented her country at Miss Universe 1994.

== Life ==
Magnano was born in Córdoba, Argentina. She won the Miss Argentina crown in 1994 and later created her own modeling agency.

== Death ==
On November 29, 2009, Magnano died of a pulmonary embolism due to complications following a cosmetic gluteoplasty she had undergone in Buenos Aires. She was 37.

== Personal life ==
She was married and was the mother of twin brothers born in 2001.

== See also ==
- Catherine Cando, Ecuadorian beauty queen who died of complications of a liposuction surgery won in a pageant
