= Susana Romero (actress) =

Argentinian actor (born 1958)

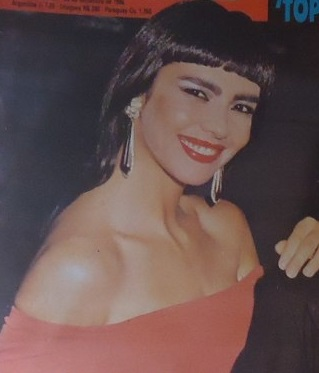
Susana Romero

Susana Romero (born Buenos Aires, 20 June 1958) is an Argentine actress, speaker vedette, activist and beauty pageant titleholder who was crowned Miss Argentina 1973 and represented her country at Miss Universe 1973.

== Biography ==
Romero, nicknamed "La negra", is recognised in the entertainment world for interpreting sexy and funny characters in Argentine cinema. She is also an animal rights defender and vegan. On 17 June 1973, she was named Miss Argentina. In Athens Greece, during the Miss Universe contest, she came in sixth place. Upon her return to Argentina, she began a successful career as a model and comedy actress, in theatre and television. In 2008, Romero published a book, El amor después de la pena. In December 1988, Romero married Abel Jacubovich. They have two daughters.

== Acting career ==
=== Television ===
In 1971, Romero began her television career on the Channel 13 musical program Alta tensión. In 1986, she began her career as an actress working with comedian Alberto Olmedo and Javier Portals on No toca botón. She became known as one of "the Olmedo girls", along with Beatriz Salomón, Adriana Brodsky, Silvia Pérez and Divina Gloria.

- 1990 - Played "Reina" in the telenovela Amándote II).
- 1991 - Comedy series
- 2004 - Movete, series on América TV
- 2004 - Presented on cable TV alongside Alberto Muney
- 2008 - TV producer and presenter, Nattiva (Channel 13)
- 2012 - Sos mi Vida (Channel 13)
- 2012 - Mi problema con las mujeres (Telefe)
- 2013 - Mitos, crónicas del amor descartable (América TV)

=== Advertising campaigns ===
- 1977: Virginia Slims cigarettes
- 1980: signed by Beguedor of Paris, in France worked for the Élite agency, modeled for Valentino, selected to interview with Salvador Dalí as a potential nude subject
- 1986: Jockey Club
- 2010: Featured with others in Razones para ser vegetariano (Reasons to Be Vegetarian), video for AnimaNaturalis

=== Film ===
Romero debuted her motion picture career in 1985 with the drama The Rigorous Fate. The same year, she appeared in El cazador de la muerte. In 1987, she played Martha in Las esclavas and appeared in two comedies, El manosanta está cargado and Galería del terror. In 1996, she appeared in Corsarios del chip, a Spanish film.

=== Theatre ===
- 1986: El negro no puede
- 1988: Con el tango y la inflación, llegamos a la elección
- 1996: Más feliz en Carlos Paz
- 1996: Más loca que una vaca
- 1998: Gansoleros - Teatro Lido, Mar del Plata
- 2000: Se vino 2000!!!
- 2006: Marido 4x4
- 2008: Sera trolo mi marido? - concert theatre
- 2013: La Cenicienta - Teatro Moulin Bleu

=== Radio ===
- 1987: La trasnoche del camionero - Radio América
- 2005: Taraguí - Radio Solidaria
- 2012/2013: Taykuma - Radio Dakota
