= Death of Catherine Cando =

Ecuadorian beauty queen

Catherine Cando
- Born: June 7, 1995; Ecuador
- Died: January 10, 2015 (aged 19)

Catherine Cando Cornejo (June 7, 1995 – January 10, 2015) was an Ecuadorean beauty queen who won the Queen of Durán pageant. A prize for the winner was a free liposuction procedure. Cando died as a result of complications during the operation at the age of 19.

== Background ==
Catherine Cando Cornejo was the youngest of five children and grew up in Durán Canton, Ecuador. Cando was studying medicine at the Catholic University of Guayaquil with an interest in social work and helping the elderly. While a student, her sister-in law encouraged her to enter the Queen of Durán contest. She won the contest in October 2014.

One of the pageant's prizes was a plastic surgery procedure. Cando initially said she would refuse the procedure. According to Cando's brother, a plastic surgeon repeatedly called Cando to convince her to undergo the liposuction procedure. Cando died on the operating table during the procedure. She was 19 years old.

The surgeon told Cando's family that the cause was brain edema, but staff later stated the cause of death was cardiac arrest as the result of a botched operation. Later, Cando's family learned that the doctor performing the surgery did not have a license to perform the surgery and the clinic where the procedure took placed did not have a permit for these procedures.

Cando was buried at the Parque de la Paz cemetery next to Sharon la Hechicera.

=== Aftermath ===
Cando's death sparked outrage in Ecuador against plastic surgery. After Cando's death, two doctors involved in the operation were arrested.

In March 2015, Cando's body was exhumed to perform a new forensic autopsy. In June 2016, the La Merced Prosecutor dismissed the case, arguing that no crime had been committed and that Cando had died of anaphylactic shock. Cando's family rejected the prosecutor's claims, arguing that six of the eight doctors involved in the investigation were not accredited.

In December 2016, 21-year-old Mexican model Melanie Johanna Montenegro Robles died under similar circumstances at a Guayaquil plastic surgery clinic. After her death, the families of both Montenegro Robles and Cando came together to demand justice for victims of medical malpractice.

== See also ==
- Andressa Urach, Brazilian television personality who nearly died of infection due to complications from plastic surgery
- Luana Andrade, Brazilian model and influencer who died of complications from a liposuction procedure
- Solange Magnano, Miss Argentina 1994 who died of cosmetic surgery complications in 2009
