= Rodolfo Aricò =

Italian painter (1930–2002)

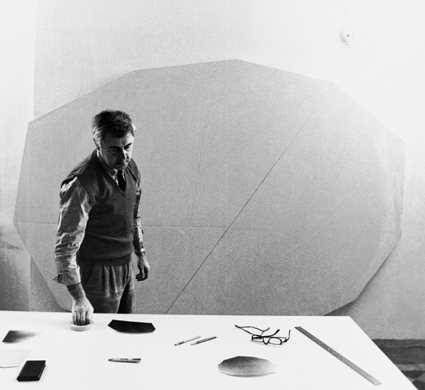
- Born: 3 June 1930; Milan, Kingdom of Italy
- Died: 22 June 2002 (aged 72); Milan, Italy
- Education: Polytechnic University of Milan
- Occupations: Artist; theatre set designer

Rodolfo Aricò (3 June 1930 – 22 June 2002) was an Italian painter and theatre set designer.

== Biography ==
Aricò was born in Milan, Italy, on 3 June 1930. He attended the Brera liceo artistico from 1946 to 1950, where famed art critic and curator Guido Ballo was one of his professors. He then studied architecture at the Polytechnic University of Milan.

In 1957 he held his first solo exhibition at the Galleria Bergamini in Milan, which was followed shortly thereafter by another solo show at the Salone Annunciata in Milan in 1959. At the XXXII Venice Biennale in 1964, Aricò exhibited the work Trittico dellaistenza. The Galleria Nazionale d'Arte Moderna in Rome became one of the first institutions to add his work to their collection when they acquired Le "simultanee forme" di Delaunay in 1965. He was invited again to present at the Venice Biennale in 1968. The following year, Deson-Zacks Gallery in Chicago hosted a solo exhibition of Aricò's work.

He continued to exhibit extensively and expand his oeuvre. In the early 1970s, Aricò explored reinterpretations of traditional art history concepts and architectural archetypes. He began using thin layers of spray paint, superimposed in drops of color to create a final monochrome result. During the 1980s, Aricò was invited to exhibit at the Venice Biennale, both in 1980 and 1986. The artist's solo exhibitions during the 1990s reflect more on the relationship with space, understood as "drama" and an element of materiality in the making. Along with his artworks, Aricò also intensified his theoretical activity, combining the writings inherent to his work with visionary and fantastic tales of an autobiographical nature.

From 1979 to 2000 Aricò was professor of theatre and set design at the Brera Academy in Milan.

Aricò died in Milan on 22 June 2002.

In 2005, the Institut Mathildenhöhe, Darmstadt held a major retrospective of his work.

Aricò's works have been collected by Irish Museum of Modern Art and Peggy Guggenheim Collection.

== Solo exhibitions (selection) ==
- Rodolfo Aricò, Galleria Bergamini, Milan, 1957.
- Rodolfo Aricò, Salone Annunciata, Milan, 1959.
- Aricò, Salone Annunciata, Milan, 1966.
- Aricò 67, Galleria L’Attico, Rome, 1967.
- Rodolfo Aricò. XXXIV Esposizione Internazionale d’Arte La Biennale di Venezia (Sala Personale), Padiglione Centrale, Venice, 1968.
- Pondus. Mostra personale di Rodolfo Aricò, Salone Annunciata, Milan, 1969.
- Rodolfo Aricò, Palais des Beaux-Arts, Bruxelles, 1969.
- Aricò, Deson-Zaks Gallery, Chicago, 1969.
- Aricò, Salone Annunciata, Studio Marconi, Milan. 1970.
- Rodolfo Aricò, Studio La Città, Verona, 1972.
- Rodolfo Aricò. La casa, Salone Annunciata, Milan, 1972.
- Rodolfo Aricò, Palazzo Grassi, Centro Internazionale delle Arti e del Costume, Venice, 1974.
- Aricò, Padiglione d’Arte Contemporanea - Parco Massari, Ferrara, 1977.
- Rodolfo Aricò. Mito e architettura, Casa del Mantegna, Mantova, 1980.
- Rodolfo Aricò, Padiglione d'Arte Contemporanea, Milan (with Gianni Colombo), 1984.
- Rodolfo Aricò, Galleria Turchetto/Plurima, Milan, 1989.
- Rodolfo Aricò. Carte Recenti, Galleria d’Arte Plurima, Udine, 1990.
- Aricò ’70. Carte, progetti, tele. Anni ’60 e ’70, Studio Carlo Grossetti, Milan, 1991.
- Rodolfo Aricò. Opere recenti, Galleria Turchetto/plurima, Milan, 1991.
- Aricò. Pitture recenti, Lorenzelli Arte, Milan, 1993.
- Rodolfo Aricò, Galleria Turchetto/Plurima, Milan, 1994.
- Rodolfo Aricò, Galleria Corraini, Mantua, 1994.
- Rodolfo Aricò. Sere, A arte Studio Invernizzi, Milan, 1997.
- Aricò, Spazio Annunciata, Milan, 2001.
- Im Element. Die Kraft des Kosmischen und des Irdischen im Werk von Rodolfo Aricò und Rudi Wach, Kaiserliche Hofburg Innsbruck, Innsbruck; Palazzo Trivulzio, Melzo, 2003.
- La pittura come procedimento attivo di Rodolfo Aricò, A arte Studio Invernizzi, Milan, 2004.
- Rodolfo Aricò. Anti-form. Works 1958–1975, Barbara Behan Contemporary Art, London, 2005.
- Rodolfo Aricò. Annäherungen an das Absolute, Institut Mathildenhöhe Darmstadt, Darmstadt, 2005.
- Rodolfo Aricò. Un erotico germinante. L’opera di Rodolfo Aricò negli anni Ottanta, A arte Studio Invernizzi, Milan, 2009.
- Rodolfo Aricò, in Postwar. Protagonisti italiani, Collezione Peggy Guggenheim, Venice, 2013.
- Rodolfo Aricò. Pittura inquieta. Gli anni Novanta, Gallerie d’Italia - Piazza della Scala, Milan, 2014.
- Rodolfo Aricò. Uno sguardo senza soggezione, A arte Invernizzi, Milan, 2014.
- Rodolfo Aricò. Uno sguardo senza soggezione, Lorenzelli Arte, Milan, 2014.
- Rodolfo Aricò. 1965–1972, Germinazione di un’idea, Galleria Il Ponte, Florence, 2014.
- Rodolfo Aricò. Icona nuda opere dal 1985 al 2001, Annunciata Galleria d’Arte, Milan, 2014.
- Omaggio a Rodolfo Aricò, Accademia di Belle Arti di Brera, Milan, 2014.
- Rodolfo Aricò, Grossetti arte contemporanea, Milan, 2015.
- Rodolfo Aricò. Line of Demarcation, Luxembourg&Dayan, London, 2016.
