= Magalí Romitelli =

Argentine beauty pageant winner

Magalí Romitelli (born 1987) is an Argentine model and beauty pageant titleholder who was crowned Miss Argentina 2006 and represented Argentina at Miss Universe 2006 pageant where she placed Top 20.
