= Arturo García Buhr =

Argentine actor

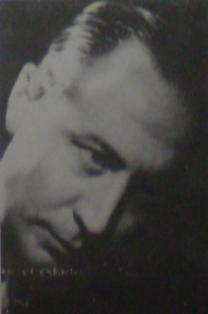
- Born: 16 December 1905; Buenos Aires, Argentina
- Died: 4 October 1995 (aged 89); Buenos Aires, Argentina
- Occupations: Actor; Film director
- Years active: 1933–1985

Arturo García Buhr (16 December 1905 – 4 October 1995) was an Argentine actor and film director notable for his work during the classical era of Argentine cinema. He appeared in 30 films between 1933 and 1985. He starred in the 1960 film The Party Is Over, which was entered into the 10th Berlin International Film Festival. At the 1943 Argentine Film Critics Association Awards, Buhr won the Silver Condor Award for Best Actor for his performance in The Kids Grow Up (Los chicos crecen) (1942).

== Selected filmography ==
=== As actor ===
- Dancing (1933)
- Such Is Life (1939)
- The Englishman of the Bones (1940)
- You Are My Love (1941)
- The Kids Grow Up (1942)
- Lauracha (1946)
- Los Isleros (1951)
- The Party Is Over (1960)
- Un Guapo del '900 (1960)
- Los Guerrilleros (1965)
- Yesterday's Guys Used No Arsenic (1976)
- Broken Comedy (1978)

=== As director ===
- Delirio (1944)
- No salgas esta noche (1946)
- Lauracha (1946)
- ¿Vendrás a media noche? (1950)
- Mi mujer, la sueca y yo (1967)
