= Tulia Ciámpoli =

Argentine actress, dancer, and violinist

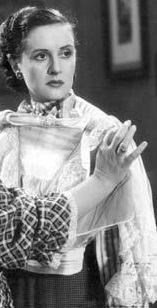
Tulia Ciámpoli in 1938

Tulia Ciámpoli (7 January 1915 in Ballesteros, Córdoba – 2 December 1981 in Buenos Aires) was an Argentine actress, dancer, and violinist. In 1928, she became the first Miss Argentina. She was of Italian descent. She was married to David Ovejero and had one daughter, Silvia.

== Biography ==
Daughter of Francisco Ciámpoli and Tulia Dagna Fierro Zamudio, she was a leading young figure in films of the 1930s.

Due to her strong features, with an imposing beauty (with her characteristic black hair and eyes), she began her extensive career at the age of 16 after being the first winner of the contest held by the magazine El Hogar Argentino in Mar del Plata, being consecrated "Miss Argentina 1928" (the first in Argentina), and whose presence was graced by President Marcelo T. de Alvear. For this triumph, she received a gold medal and two portraits of her made by Rodolfo Kiss and Richard Hall.

Her great hobby was always motor racing. After graduating from high school, she studied ballet and violin.

== Filmography ==
- Galería de esperanzas (1934)
- Bajo la santa Federación (1934)
- Internado (1935)
- El cabo Rivero (1938)
- Las de Barranco (1938)
- Cándida (1939)
