= Internado =

- Directed by: Carlos de la Pua; Héctor Basso
- Written by: Carlos Muñoz; Carlos de la Pua
- Starring: Francisco Audenino; Tulia Ciámpoli; Irma Córdoba; Ricardo de Rosas; Gloria Ferrandiz; Florindo Ferrario; Roberto Paéz; Juan Vítola
- Music by: Cátulo Castillo
- Distributed by: Cabildo Films
- Release date: 1935
- Country: Argentina
- Language: Spanish

Internado is a 1935 Argentine musical film of the Golden Age of Argentine cinema directed by Carlos de la Pua and Héctor Basso.
