= Delirio (1944 film) =

- Directed by: Arturo García Buhr
- Written by: Carlos Damel, Conrado Nalé Roxlo
- Cinematography: Hugo Chiesa
- Edited by: Kurt Land
- Music by: Paul Misraki
- Production company: Lumiton Studios
- Release date: 1944
- Country: Argentina
- Language: Spanish

Delirio is a 1944 Argentine comedy film of the classical era of Argentine cinema, the directorial debut of actor and director Arturo García Buhr. It was adapted from the play "Una Viuda Dificil", which was performed at the Segunda Premio Nacional de Teatro. The film was produced by Lumiton Studios. The film stars Irma Córdoba, Rosa Rosen and Iris Portillo.

== Cast ==
- Irma Córdoba
- Rosa Rosen
- Iris Portillo
- Roberto Fugazot
- Arturo García Buhr
- Raimundo Pastore
- Tilda Thamar
- Juan Vítola
