= José Aricó =

José María Aricó (1931 – 1991) was a prolific essayist, militant activist, and one of the driving forces in creating the New Intellectual Left within Argentina. Strongly influenced by Marx and Marxist thinkers like Antonio Gramsci, Kautsky, and others, Aricó would go on to promote these intellectuals through his own writings, translations and teachings.

== Biography ==
=== Early life ===
José María Aricó was born on the 27th of July 1931 in Villa María, Córdoba Province, Argentina. According to the José Aricó Library, his interest in politics and Marxism was sparked at 13 when he was introduced to the idea of historical materialism. When he was 16 (1947), Aricó joined the Communist Party of Argentina (Partido Comunista de la Argentina, PCA). As a politically active young adult, he also participated in the militant student movement aimed at reforming both the university and the government, which at the time was functioning under Peronism. Although he abandoned his official studies at the National University of Córdoba, in favor of joining the Communist Youth Federation of Córdoba, he never abandoned his studies of Marxist literature and thought.

=== Career ===
Aricó was a prolific essayist, editor, and translator of Socialist and Marxist literature. His writings were published in many different countries and sources throughout Latin-America (Socialismo y Participación, Peru; Debates, Argentina; Nexos, Mexico; Nueva Sociedad, Venezuela; etc.). Aricó was one of the principal creators or writers of three separate magazines. The first magazine, Pasado y Presente, would be created in 1963 in collaboration with other intellectuals Oscar del Barco, Héctor Schmucler and Samuel Kicszkovsky. This magazine, which would run until 1965 and have nine issues, would also ultimately be the cause of his expulsion from the PCA. The second magazine, Cuadernos de Pasado y Presente, would be a continuation of the first and would be published sometime after. Finally, the third magazine, Controversia, para un examen de la realidad argentina, was written within the context of the exiled Argentinians in Mexico, of which Aricó was one.

Beyond the magazines and articles, Aricó was a founder of the Socialist Culture Club, editor of La Ciudad Futura, principal investigator of the National Council of Scientific and Technical Research (CONICET), director of the Library of Socialist Thought, professor at FLACSO, and important translator and editor of many significant European Marxist and Socialist theorist.

=== Death ===
José María Aricó died on August 22, 1991.

=== Legacy ===
Two more books of Aricó's writings were published in 1999 after his death (La hipótesis de Justo: escritos sobre el socialismo en América Latina; and The Interviews, 1974-1991).

According to the Biographical Dictionary of the Latin American Left:

"'Aricó becomes a focus of irradiation of political problematizations and circulation of renewing ideas, of balances of experiences and formulation of new strategic horizons, in particular around the "crisis of Marxism", the "revaluation of democracy", the emergence of new social and political actors and the protagonism of "civil society".'"

== Works ==
- Marx and Latin America (English translation of Marx y América Latina). Leiden & Boston, Brill (2014)
- Mariátegui y los orígenes del marxismo latinoamericano
- Marx y América Latina
- La cola del diablo. Itinerario de Gramsci en América Latina
- La hipótesis de Justo: escritos sobre el socialismo en América Latina
- Entrevistas, 1974-1991
