= Yésica Di Vincenzo =

Argentine beauty pageant titleholder

- Born: Yésica Natalia Di Vincenzo; November 28, 1987 (age 38); Mar del Plata, Argentina
- Occupation: Model
- Height: 1.74 m (5 ft 8 1/2 in)
- Beauty pageant titleholder
- Title: Miss Universo Argentina 2010
- Hair color: Brown
- Eye color: Brown
- Major competitions: Miss International 2008; Miss Universo Argentina 2010 (Winner); Miss Universe 2010; Reina Hispanoamericana 2010 (7th place)

Yésica Natalia Di Vincenzo (born November 28, 1987) is an Argentine beauty pageant titleholder who was crowned Miss Universo Argentina and represented her country in the Miss Universe 2010 and Miss International 2008 pageants. Yesica participated in Miss Italia nel Mondo, but did not win.

== Miss Universo Argentina 2010 ==
Di Vincenzo, competed as Miss Buenos Aires, one of 24 finalists in her country's national beauty pageant, Miss Universo Argentina, held in Mar del Plata on June 6, 2010, where she became the eventual winner of the title, gaining the right to represent Argentina in Miss Universe 2010.

== Miss Universe 2010 ==
As the official representative of her country to the Miss Universe 2010 pageant broadcast live from Las Vegas, Nevada on August 23, Di Vincenzo participated as one of the 83 delegates who vied for the crown of eventual winner, Ximena Navarrete of Mexico.

Awards and achievements
Preceded by Johanna Lasic	Miss Universo Argentina; 2010	Succeeded by Natalia Rodriguez
