= List of works by Manuel Romero =

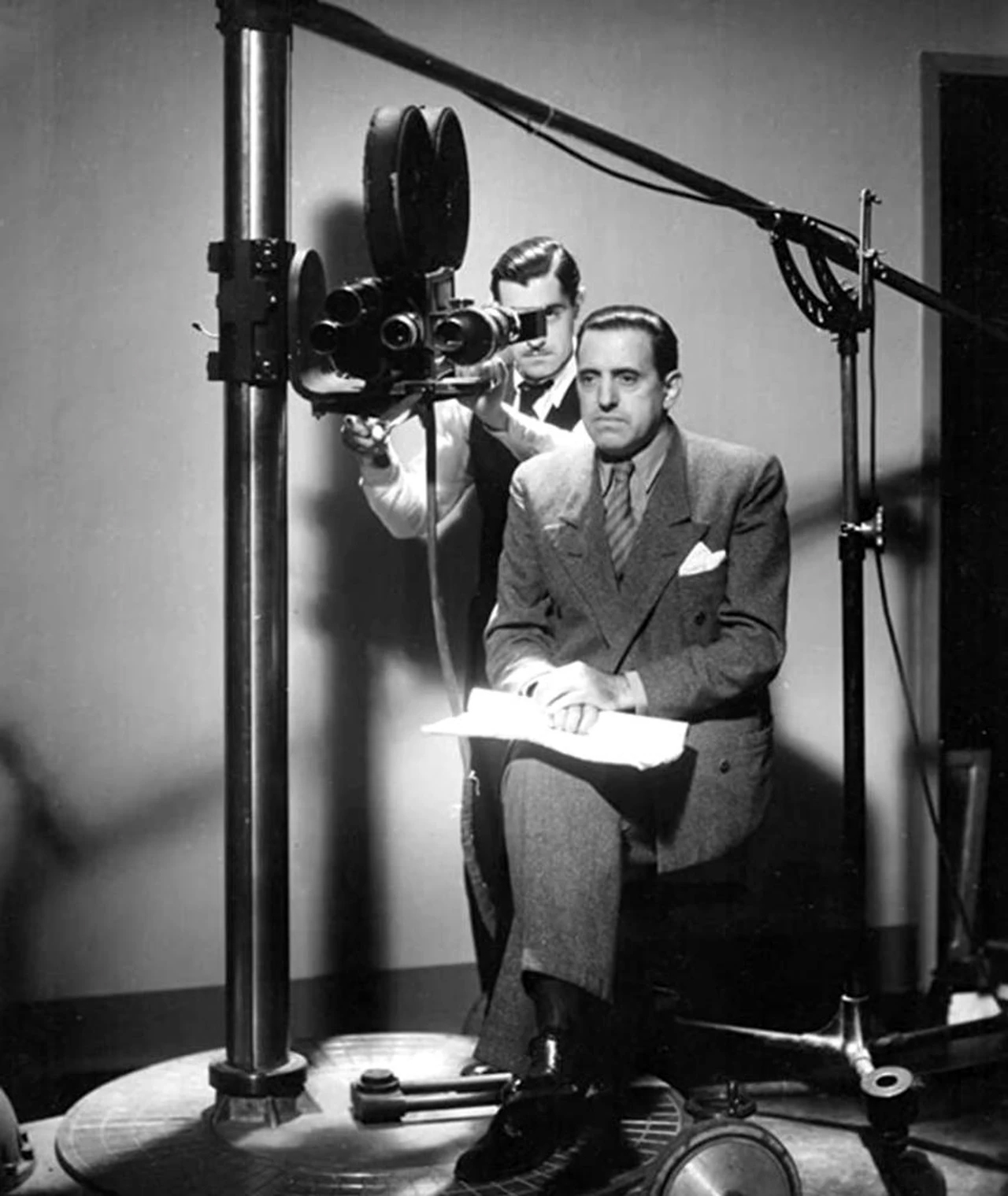
Manuel Romero (seated) on a film set, c. 1930s.

Manuel Romero (Buenos Aires, 21 September 1891 – 3 October 1954) was an Argentine filmmaker, playwright, impresario, theatre director and tango lyricist. He was credited with 53 films, 178 plays and 146 song lyrics. Romero was one of the creators of the revista porteña (local revue), one of the leading writers of the tango canción movement, and one of the first directors of the Golden Age of Argentine cinema, becoming the most prolific and commercially successful Argentine filmmaker of the 1930s. Closely associated with the Buenos Aires nightlife, he developed his career as the Argentine entertainment industry was taking form, and his work helped define the modern porteño cultural identity. In 2026, the National Library of Argentina described him as "one of the most versatile, prolific and influential figures in Argentine popular culture."

Romero began writing plays in the 1910s, while working as a journalist and theatre critic in Fray Mocho, Crítica and other publications, and went on to write numerous revues, sainetes, comedies, melodramas and some grotescos criollos. His main field was the revue, and with Ivo Pelay and Luis Bayón Herrera he was one of the three leading authors of the genre. In the 1920s, the three developed the revista porteña, drawing on the French companies that visited Buenos Aires and on what Romero saw on his frequent trips to Paris. From 1926, he led his own revue companies at the Ópera and Sarmiento theatres, while his other plays were staged by the companies of Enrique Muiño and Elías Alippi, César Ratti and Luis Arata, among others. Many of his tangos were first sung on stage in these plays, including "Patotero sentimental" (1922), premiered by Ignacio Corsini, "Buenos Aires" (1923), the first tango to personify the city, and "Tiempos viejos" (1926). Carlos Gardel recorded eighteen of his songs.

In 1931, during a European tour with his revue company, Romero and Bayón Herrera wrote the story of Las luces de Buenos Aires, Gardel's first sound feature, made by Paramount at its Joinville Studios near Paris, where Romero then directed his first two films, Spanish-language versions of earlier productions by the American studio. Back in Buenos Aires, he was hired by Lumiton, the first Argentine studio organized on industrial lines, which was looking for a director with experience in popular entertainment. His first film for the studio, Noches de Buenos Aires (1935), had each of its stars do what they were already famous for on stage and radio, with Tita Merello singing tangos, Fernando Ochoa reciting verses and Enrique Serrano delivering comic lines. Its success set the model for a long series of films, nearly all of them written by Romero himself and shot at great speed, that brought together figures from radio, revue and tango; Romero gave Niní Marshall and Hugo del Carril their first film roles and helped consolidate Luis Sandrini's comic screen persona. His films sided with the poor against the rich and often poked fun at figures of authority, though their endings usually restored the social order. Romero was also the first Argentine filmmaker to write active, independent female characters, as in La rubia del camino and Mujeres que trabajan (both 1938).

Although his films were box office hits, critics and intellectuals of the time looked down on them, and reviewers who welcomed the growth of the national industry disliked the way Romero catered to the "easy tastes" of mass audiences. He left Lumiton in 1943 and from 1946 worked mainly for Argentina Sono Film, where he made successful films with the singer Alberto Castillo and worked again with Niní Marshall. Historians generally regard this later period as one of stylistic decline, marked by a depletion of his own formulas, although El hincha (1951), made with Enrique Santos Discépolo, is among the most celebrated films of his final years. After Un guapo del 900 was left unfinished when Lumiton went bankrupt in 1952, he made one more film, ¡Uei, paesano! (1953), and died in Buenos Aires the following year. Like much of Argentina's classical cinema, many of his films are lost or survive only in 16 mm copies, as most of Lumiton's negatives were probably destroyed in a laboratory fire in 1969. His work began to be reassessed in the 1980s and 1990s by writers such as Abel Posadas, Rodrigo Tarruella and Andrés Insaurralde. Fuera de la ley (1937) was ranked tenth in the Museo del Cine Pablo Ducrós Hicken's 1977 poll of the greatest Argentine films, and Mujeres que trabajan was included in the top 100 of the 2022 edition.

== Films ==
This list of films is based on the filmographies in Manuel Romero by Andrés Insaurralde and Diccionario de realizadores by Clara Kriger and Alejandra Portela. Details for individual films are from Un diccionario de films argentinos (1930–1995) by Raúl Manrupe and Portela unless another source is cited. Premieres took place in Buenos Aires cinemas unless otherwise stated.

List of films directed or written by Manuel Romero, showing year, credits, production company, premiere and other relevant details
Year	Title	Director	Writer	Production company	Premiere	Notes	Ref
1931	Las luces de Buenos Aires	No	Yes	Paramount	23 September 1931, Capitol	Co-written by Luis Bayón Herrera and directed by Adelqui Millar; with Carlos Gardel and Gloria Guzmán. American production filmed at Joinville Studios, Paris. Romero also served as an assistant director.	
1931	La pura verdad	Yes	No	Paramount	4 December 1931, Gloria	With José Isbert, Enriqueta Serrano and Manuel Russell. American production filmed at Joinville Studios, Paris; Spanish-language version of Nothing But the Truth with adapted screenplay by Pedro Muñoz Seca. Romero's directorial debut.	
1932	¿Cuándo te suicidas?	Yes	No	Paramount	27 January 1932 (Bilbao, Spain); January 1933 (Buenos Aires)	With Fernando Soler, Imperio Argentina, Manuel Russell and José Isbert. American production filmed at Joinville Studios, Paris; Spanish-language version of Quand te tues-tu? with adapted screenplay by Claudio de la Torre.	
1935	Noches de Buenos Aires	Yes	Yes	Lumiton	27 March 1935, Monumental	Co-written by Luis Bayón Herrera; with Fernando Ochoa, Tita Merello, Severo Fernández, Irma Córdoba and Enrique Serrano. Romero's first film made in Argentina.	
1935	El caballo del pueblo	Yes	Yes	Lumiton	15 August 1935, Renacimiento	Co-written by Luis Bayón Herrera; with Olinda Bozán, Pedro Quartucci, Irma Córdoba, Juan Carlos Thorry and Enrique Serrano.	
1936	La muchachada de a bordo	Yes	Yes	Lumiton	5 February 1936, Monumental	Based on Romero's play of the same name; with Luis Sandrini, Tito Lusiardo, Santiago Arrieta, José Gola, Alicia Barrié and Benita Puértolas.	
1936	Don Quijote del altillo	Yes	Yes	SIDE	3 June 1936, Monumental	With Luis Sandrini, Nuri Montsé and Eduardo Sandrini.	
1936	Radio Bar	Yes	Yes	AIA	10 September 1936, Astor	With Gloria Guzmán, Olinda Bozán, Carmen Lamas, Alicia Barrié, Alberto Vila, Juan Carlos Thorry and Marcos Caplán.	
1937	El cañonero de Giles	Yes	Yes	Lumiton	20 January 1937, Monumental	With Luis Sandrini, Luisa Vehil, Marcos Caplán, Héctor Quintanilla and Mario Fortuna.	
1937	Los muchachos de antes no usaban gomina	Yes	Yes	Lumiton	31 March 1937, Monumental	Based on Romero and Mario Bénard's play of the same name; with Florencio Parravicini, Mecha Ortiz, Santiago Arrieta, Martín Zabalúa, Irma Córdoba and Hugo del Carril.	
1937	La muchacha del circo	Yes	Yes	Río de la Plata	5 May 1937, Monumental	Based on Romero's play El gran circo Rivolta; with Luis Arata, León Zárate and Irma Córdoba.	
1937	Fuera de la ley	Yes	Yes	Lumiton	14 July 1937, Monumental	With José Gola, Luis Arata, Irma Córdoba and Marcos Caplán.	
1937	La vuelta de Rocha	Yes	Yes	Lumiton	8 September 1937, Monumental	With Mercedes Simone, Tito Lusiardo, Marcos Caplán, Floren Delbene and Alicia Barrié.	
1938	Tres anclados en París	Yes	Yes	Lumiton	26 January 1938, Monumental	With Florencio Parravicini, Tito Lusiardo, Hugo del Carril, Irma Córdoba and Enrique Serrano. Originally titled Tres argentinos en París; the title was changed after Romero and the producers refused to cut a scene in which the protagonists cheat at poker, as demanded by the state film authority, which considered it damaging to the country's image.	
1938	La rubia del camino	Yes	Yes	Lumiton	6 April 1938, Monumental	With Paulina Singerman, Enrique Serrano, Fernando Borel and Sabina Olmos.	
1938	Mujeres que trabajan	Yes	Yes	Lumiton	6 July 1938, Monumental	With Mecha Ortiz, Tito Lusiardo, Niní Marshall (who wrote her own lines), Pepita Serrador, Alicia Barrié, Sabina Olmos and Fernando Borel.	
1939	La vida es un tango	Yes	Yes	Lumiton	8 February 1939, Monumental	With Florencio Parravicini, Tito Lusiardo, Hugo del Carril and Sabina Olmos.	
1939	La modelo y la estrella	Yes	Yes	Lumiton	15 March 1939, Monumental	With Alita Román, Fernando Borel and June Marlowe.	
1939	Divorcio en Montevideo	Yes	Yes	Lumiton	7 June 1939, Monumental	With Niní Marshall, Sabina Olmos and Enrique Serrano; one of Argentina's entries at the 7th Venice International Film Festival.	
1939	Gente bien	Yes	Yes	EFA	28 June 1939, Monumental	With Hugo del Carril, Tito Lusiardo, Delia Garcés and June Marlowe.	
1939	Muchachas que estudian	Yes	Yes	Lumiton	6 September 1939, Monumental	With Enrique Serrano, Sofía Bozán, Alicia Vignoli, Delia Garcés, Pepita Serrador and Alicia Barrié.	
1940	Casamiento en Buenos Aires	Yes	Yes	Lumiton	1 January 1940, Monumental	With Niní Marshall, Enrique Serrano, Sabina Olmos and June Marlowe.	
1940	Carnaval de antaño	Yes	Yes	Lumiton	17 April 1940, Monumental	With Florencio Parravicini, Sofía Bozán, Charlo and Sabina Olmos.	
1940	Los muchachos se divierten	Yes	Yes	Lumiton	3 July 1940, Monumental	With Enrique Serrano, Sofía Bozán, Sabina Olmos and Alicia Barrié.	
1940	Isabelita	Yes	Yes	Lumiton	31 July 1940, Monumental	With Paulina Singerman, Tito Lusiardo, Sofía Bozán and Juan Carlos Thorry.	
1940	Luna de miel en Río	Yes	Yes	Lumiton	9 October 1940, Monumental	With Niní Marshall, Enrique Serrano, Tito Lusiardo, Alicia Barrié and Juan Carlos Thorry.	
1941	Un bebé de París	Yes	Yes	Lumiton	17 March 1941, Ocean	Based on the play by Camilo Darthés and Carlos S. Damel; with Paulina Singerman, Enrique Serrano and Ernesto Raquén.	
1941	Yo quiero ser bataclana	Yes	Yes	Lumiton	30 April 1941, Broadway	With Niní Marshall, Alicia Barrié, Sabina Olmos and Juan Carlos Thorry.	
1941	El tesoro de la isla Maciel	Yes	Yes	Lumiton	8 July 1941, Monumental	Based on Romero's play of the same name; with Luis Arata, Severo Fernández, Alberto Bello and Silvana Roth.	
1941	Mi amor eres tú	Yes	Yes	Lumiton	10 September 1941, Monumental	With Paulina Singerman, Arturo García Buhr and Severo Fernández.	
1942	Una luz en la ventana	Yes	Yes	Lumiton	12 May 1942, Broadway	With Narciso Ibáñez Menta, Irma Córdoba, Juan Carlos Thorry and Severo Fernández.	
1942	Elvira Fernández, vendedora de tiendas	Yes	Yes	ADAP	1 July 1942, Broadway	With Paulina Singerman, Juan Carlos Thorry, Tito Lusiardo and Sofía Bozán.	
1942	Ven mi corazón te llama	Yes	Yes	Lumiton	9 September 1942, Ambassador	With Elvira Ríos, Tito Lusiardo, Alicia Barrié and Elena Lucena.	
1942	Historia de crímenes	Yes	Yes	Lumiton	9 November 1942, Monumental	With Narciso Ibáñez Menta, Zully Moreno, Nuri Montsé, Osvaldo Miranda and Severo Fernández.	
1943	El fabricante de estrellas	Yes	Yes	Lumiton	18 March 1943, Broadway	With Pepe Arias, Tito Lusiardo, Alicia Barrié, Carmen del Moral and Osvaldo Miranda.	
1943	La calle Corrientes	Yes	Yes	Lumiton	14 July 1943, Monumental	Based on Romero's play; with Tito Lusiardo, Severo Fernández, Alberto Anchart and Elena Lucena.	
1944	Hay que casar a Paulina	Yes	Yes	Argentina Sono Film	31 March 1944, Monumental	Based on a play by George Evans; with Paulina Singerman, Francisco Álvarez and Rafael Frontaura.	
1946	El diablo andaba en los choclos	Yes	No	Independent production by Luis Sandrini and Francisco Canaro	17 May 1946, Iguazú	Written by Pedro E. Pico and Ivo Pelay, based on the play by Orlando Aldama; with Luis Sandrini, Silvana Roth and Alita Román.	
1946	Adiós pampa mía	Yes	Yes	Argentina Sono Film	27 December 1946, Monumental	With Alberto Castillo, Perla Mux, Alberto Vila and María Esther Gamas.	
1947	Navidad de los pobres	Yes	Yes	Argentina Sono Film	12 August 1947, Monumental	Co-written by Nicolás Viola; with Niní Marshall, Irma Córdoba, Tito Lusiardo, Fernando Lamas and Osvaldo Miranda. Marshall won the Silver Condor Award for Best Comedy Actress.	
1948	El tango vuelve a París	Yes	Yes	Argentina Sono Film	16 January 1948, Monumental	With Alberto Castillo, Elvira Ríos, Fernando Lamas and Severo Fernández.	
1948	Porteña de corazón	Yes	Yes	Argentina Sono Film	9 April 1948, Ocean	Co-written by Nicolás Viola; with Niní Marshall, Augusto Codecá, Lilian Valmar and Jorge Salcedo.	
1948	La rubia Mireya	Yes	Yes	Argentina Sono Film	8 August 1948, Monumental	With Mecha Ortiz, Fernando Lamas, Elena Lucena and Severo Fernández. Lucena won the Silver Condor Award for Best Comedy Actress.	
1949	Un tropezón cualquiera da en la vida	Yes	Yes	Argentina Sono Film	20 January 1949, Monumental	Based on a story by Fernando Benavídez and Rodolfo Sciammarella; with Alberto Castillo, Virginia Luque, Francisco Álvarez and Fidel Pintos.	
1949	Mujeres que bailan	Yes	Yes	Argentina Sono Film	12 May 1949, Monumental	With Niní Marshall, Fanny Navarro, Fidel Pintos and José María Gutiérrez. The Argentine Academy of Motion Picture Arts and Sciences awarded Romero a special mention and a medal for the film and for his earlier contributions to Argentine cinema.	
1949	La historia del tango	Yes	Yes	Cosmos	29 June 1949, Monumental	Based on a story by Enrique Cadícamo and Francisco García Jiménez; with Virginia Luque, Francisco Canaro, Fernando Lamas, Tito Lusiardo and Severo Fernández.	
1949	Morir en su ley	Yes	Yes	Lumiton	29 September 1949, Ideal and Premier	With Tita Merello, Roberto Escalada, Juan José Míguez, Fanny Navarro and Severo Fernández.	
1950	Valentina	Yes	Yes	Lumiton	3 May 1950, Monumental	With Olga Zubarry, Juan José Míguez, Elena Lucena and Severo Fernández.	
1950	Juan Mondiola	Yes	No	Emelco	5 September 1950, Ambassador	Written by Alejandro Verbitsky and Emilio Villalba Welsh; with Juan José Míguez, Elina Colomer and Laura Hidalgo.	
1951	Derecho viejo	Yes	No	Emelco	4 January 1951, Monumental	Written by Alfredo Ruanova; with Juan José Míguez, Laura Hidalgo, Nélida Bilbao and Severo Fernández.	
1951	El hincha	Yes	Yes	Argentina Sono Film	13 April 1951, Ocean	Based on a story by Enrique Santos Discépolo and Julio Porter; with Discépolo, Diana Maggi and Mario Passano.	
1951	¡Arriba el telón! (El patio de la morocha)	Yes	Yes	Argentina Sono Film	14 August 1951, Monumental	Based on the tango by Mariano Mores and Cátulo Castillo; with Virginia Luque, Juan Carlos Mareco and Severo Fernández.	
1952	Un guapo del 900 (unfinished)	Yes	No	Lumiton	Unreleased	Co-directed by Lucas Demare; written by Ulises Petit de Murat, based on the play by Samuel Eichelbaum; with Pedro Maratea, Guillermo Battaglia, Nélida Bilbao, Milagros de la Vega and Santiago Gómez Cou. Shooting was halted after three weeks under Demare and one under Romero, when the studio went bankrupt; 120 shots were filmed between May and July 1952.	
1953	¡Uei, paesano!	Yes	Yes	Argentina Sono Film	15 June 1953, Broadway and Luxor	With Nicola Paone, Fidel Pintos, Olga Gatti and Susana Campos.	

== Theatre ==
This list includes only the plays whose existence can be verified in published sources, and is not complete. Details are from La revista porteña. Teatro efímero entre dos revoluciones (1890-1930) by Gonzalo Demaría unless another source is cited, and premieres took place in Buenos Aires theatres unless otherwise stated. The notes give, where known, each play's co-writers, the company that staged it, the songs by Romero premiered in it and its film adaptations.

List of plays written by Manuel Romero, showing year, genre, premiere and other relevant details
Year	Title	Genre	Premiere	Notes	Ref
1916	Conflictos internacionales	Revue		Romero's first revue; staged by the company of Enrique de Rosas and Luis Arata.	
1919	Teatro breve		7 January 1919, Comedia	Co-written by Ivo Pelay.	
1919	El loco Mendoza	Juguete cómico	3 July 1919, Nacional	One-act comedy co-written by Torcuato Insausti; staged by the company of Luis Arata, Leopoldo Simari and José Franco, all three of whom appeared in the cast.	
1919	El correntino Vidal	Sainete	18 July 1919, Ópera	Romero's first play as sole author, with music by Francisco Payá; staged by the company of Luis Vittone and Segundo Pomar.	
1919	Mientras la ciudad duerme		10 October 1919, Ópera	One-act play subtitled "four sketches of Buenos Aires at night"; staged by the company of Luis Vittone and Segundo Pomar.	
1919	¡A trabajar, caballeros!	Sainete	12 December 1919, Ópera	Staged by the company of Luis Vittone and Segundo Pomar, with Olinda Bozán in the cast.	
1920	La revista del mundo	Revue	10 March 1920, Teatro Buenos Aires	Described by Romero as a "comic-lyric-dance fantasy"; staged by the company of Enrique Muiño and Elías Alippi with lavish sets and costumes, and ran for a considerable time.	
1920	Almanaque de los sueños	Revue	28 May 1920, Teatro Buenos Aires	Staged by the company of Enrique Muiño and Elías Alippi, with music by José Padilla.	
1920	Percanta que me amuraste			Co-written by Pascual Contursi; staged by the company of Luis Vittone and Segundo Pomar. Members of the company performed excerpts from it on the radio shortly after the first radio broadcast in Buenos Aires, on 27 August 1920.	
1921	Panorama nacional	Revue	11 April 1921, Teatro Buenos Aires	Co-written by Ivo Pelay, with music by Antonio De Bassi; staged by the company of Enrique Muiño and Elías Alippi. Subtitled "a revue of our own things".	
1921	Don Jaime el conquistador	Comedy	2 July 1921, Politeama Argentino	Three-act comedy co-written by Domingo Parra; staged by the company of Roberto Casaux, with Casaux, Pierina Dealessi and Enrique Serrano in the cast.	
1921	La vuelta al mundo en una hora	Revue	13 August 1921, Ópera	Co-written by Ivo Pelay; staged by the company of Luis Vittone and Segundo Pomar. Each of its scenes evoked a different country.	
1921	La ilusión de Sabatucci	Sainete	San Martín	Staged by the company of Luis Arata, Leopoldo Simari and José Franco, with Arata, Simari and Eva Franco in the cast. Published in August 1921; the date of its premiere is unknown.	
1921	El rincón de la alegría	Sainete	18 October 1921, Teatro Buenos Aires	Staged by the company of Enrique Muiño and Elías Alippi, both of whom appeared in the cast.	
1922	¡Al Politeama, chauffeur!	Revue	29 April 1922, Politeama	Co-written by Francisco Collazo; staged by the company of Luis Vittone and Segundo Pomar. A car was raffled during the performance, apparently at Romero's suggestion, making it the first Buenos Aires revue to include a raffle.	
1922	El bailarín del cabaret		12 May 1922, Apolo	Staged by the company of César Ratti. Ignacio Corsini, who was in the cast, premiered Romero's tango "El patotero sentimental", with music by Manuel Jovés, in it. Romero also published a novel version of the story. Its sequel, La vuelta de Pirincho, premiered in 1923.	
1922	El gran premio nacional		28 June 1922, Politeama Argentino	One-act "turf-sentimental play"; staged by the company of Luis Vittone and Segundo Pomar, with Olinda Bozán in the cast. It included Romero's tango "La provincianita", with music by Manuel Jovés.	
1923	En el fango de París	Melodrama	22 February 1923, Maipo	Inaugurated the Maipo as a theatre; staged by the company of Felisa Mary, Carlos Morganti and Eliseo Gutiérrez. Although not a musical play, it included two songs with music by Manuel Jovés and lyrics by Romero: the shimmy "París" and the tango "Buenos Aires", premiered by Morganti.	
1923	Buenos Aires Folies	Revue	15 March 1923, Avenida	Staged by the company of Luis Vittone and Segundo Pomar; its title echoed the Ziegfeld Follies, and critics praised its lavishness.	
1923	La vuelta de Pirincho		16 March 1923, Apolo	Sequel to El bailarín del cabaret; staged by the company of César Ratti, with Ignacio Corsini in the cast. It included Romero's tango "El prisionero", with music by Enrique Delfino.	
1923	El rey del cabaret	Sainete	21 April 1923	Co-written by Alberto Weisbach. It included Romero's tango of the same name, with music by Enrique Delfino. In July 1923 it was staged by the company of Luis Arata on tour in Córdoba and Rosario.	
1923	¡Patotero, rey del bailongo!		31 May 1923, Teatro Buenos Aires	Staged by the company of Enrique Muiño and Elías Alippi, both of whom appeared in the cast. It included Romero's tango "Nubes de humo", with music by Manuel Jovés.	
1923	El ganador de la copa de oro		10 August 1923, Porteño	With Marcelo Ruggero in the cast. It included Romero's tango "¡Pingo mío!", with music by Manuel Jovés.	
1923	Pasen a ver el fenómeno	Revue	7 September 1923, Porteño	Co-written by Ivo Pelay, with music by Manuel Jovés. Advertised as having only national scenes, in contrast to the French-style revues then in fashion.	
1923	Las catástrofes del año	Revue	31 October 1923, Porteño	Co-written by Ivo Pelay, with music by Manuel Jovés. A success; it included a scene borrowed from the company of Madame Rasimi.	
1923	No arrebaten que hay pa' todos	Revue	7 December 1923, Porteño	Co-written by Ivo Pelay.	
1924	De Puente Alsina a Montmartre	Revue	11 July 1924	Co-written by Ivo Pelay. Its finale featured a 15,000-litre pool on stage and a troupe of swimmers.	
1924	A ver quién nos pisa el poncho	Revue	15 October 1924, Porteño	Co-written by Luis Bayón Herrera and Ivo Pelay.	
1925	¡Atención a la largada!	Revue	14 March 1925, Porteño	Co-written by Luis Bayón Herrera and Ivo Pelay.	
1925	Ahí va de mi flor un gajo	Revue	14 March 1925, Porteño	Co-written by Luis Bayón Herrera and Ivo Pelay.	
1926	La Maravillosa Revista	Revue	11 March 1926, Ópera	Opening show of the company of which Romero was director and impresario, starring Harry Pilcer. José Muñiz premiered Romero's tango "Tiempos viejos", with music by Francisco Canaro, in it. Despite 190 performances, it was a financial disaster.	
1926	¿De qué está usted enamorado?	Revue	30 April 1926, Ópera	Co-written by Luis Bayón Herrera.	
1926	Dejad que las niñas vengan a mí	Revue	20 May 1926, Ópera	Co-written by Luis Bayón Herrera.	
1926	Ya está armado el batifondo	Revue	18 June 1926, Ópera	Co-written by Luis Bayón Herrera. After its poor reception, Romero ended the company's season.	
1926	Los muchachos de antes no usaban gomina	Comedy	21 October 1926, Teatro Buenos Aires	Co-written by Mario Bénard; staged by the company of Enrique Muiño. A non-musical play named after a line of "Tiempos viejos", which was heard at the end of its fourth scene. One of Romero's most enduring works, it was revived several times and adapted into his film Los muchachos de antes no usaban gomina (1937).	
1927	Buenos Aires, la reina del Plata...		1 April 1927, Apolo	A "visionary play of great spectacle", in four scenes; staged by the company of César Ratti.	
1927	Mariposas de bataclán		Comedia	Staged by the company of Eva Franco.	
1928	Nueva York en Buenos Aires	Revue	1 March 1928, Sarmiento	Co-written by Luis Bayón Herrera.	
1928	El telar maravilloso	Revue	1 March 1928, Sarmiento	Co-written by Luis Bayón Herrera.	
1928	Artistas y modelos	Revue	2 May 1928, Sarmiento	Co-written by Luis Bayón Herrera, with music by Hans Diernhammer. Its title translated that of the Broadway revue Artists and Models, which Romero and Bayón Herrera had seen in New York.	
1928	De la lira al saxofón	Revue	12 June 1928, Sarmiento	Co-written by Luis Bayón Herrera.	
1928	Gran circo Rivolta	Grotesco	15 June 1928, Teatro Buenos Aires	Staged by the company of Enrique Muiño, who was in the cast. It included Romero's tango "La muchacha del circo", with music by Gerardo Matos Rodríguez, and was adapted into Romero's film La muchacha del circo (1937).	
1928	Buenos Aires tiritando	Revue	28 July 1928, Sarmiento	Co-written by Luis Bayón Herrera.	
1928	La hora de la sátira	Revue	23 August 1928, Sarmiento	Co-written by Luis Bayón Herrera. A sketch mocking the outgoing president Marcelo T. de Alvear and the incoming Hipólito Yrigoyen led the Círculo de Autores to ask for its removal. Alvear himself then wrote a public letter on the matter, the first known text by an Argentine president referring to the revue.	
1929	Las aventuras de tres cesantes	Musical comedy	4 April 1929, Sarmiento	Co-written by Luis Bayón Herrera.	
1929	La historia regocijante del guante desesperante	Musical comedy	5 May 1929, Sarmiento	Co-written by Luis Bayón Herrera, with music by Francisco Payá.	
1929	El presidente tiene razón	Revue	15 June 1929, Sarmiento	Co-written by Luis Bayón Herrera. It satirized current politics and included a parody of Josephine Baker by Marcos Caplán.	
1929	¡Hay que tocarle el trigémino!	Revue	24 July 1929, Sarmiento	Co-written by Luis Bayón Herrera. It satirized current politics, taking as its starting point the visit to Buenos Aires of the Spanish physician Fernando Asuero.	
1929	El entrevero del 17	Farce	6 August 1929, Comedia	Staged by the company of Olinda Bozán, who was in the cast, as was José Otal.	
1929	¡S. E. está que arde!	Revue	22 August 1929, Sarmiento	Co-written by Luis Bayón Herrera. It satirized current politics. Sofía Bozán premiered Romero's tango "¡Qué querés con ese loro!", with music by Enrique Delfino, in it.	
1930	La muchachada de a bordo	Sainete	14 March 1930, Teatro Buenos Aires	Subtitled "scenes of life in the Argentine Navy"; staged by the company of Enrique Muiño, who was in the cast. Adapted into Romero's film of the same name (1936).	
1930	¡El "dotor" está patético!	Revue	26 April 1930, Sarmiento	Co-written by Luis Bayón Herrera. The biggest success of the year, its satire of national politics was praised even by newspapers usually hostile to the revue, such as La Nación.	
1930	Ejército de Salvación	Sainete	4 June 1930, Cómico	Staged by the company of Elías Alippi, Marcelo Ruggero and José Otal, all three of whom appeared in the cast, as did Iris Marga.	
1930	Las burlas del film sonoro	Revue	4 July 1930, Sarmiento	Co-written by Luis Bayón Herrera. Based entirely on imitations of Hollywood stars such as Maurice Chevalier and Greta Garbo.	
1930	Aventuras de una criolla en París	Revue	26 July 1930, Sarmiento	Co-written by Luis Bayón Herrera. Marked the return of Sofía Bozán from Paris; she premiered Romero's tango "¡Qué hacés, che parisién!", with music by Enrique Delfino, in it.	
1930	Montevideo (Q.E.P.D.)	Revue	Banned	Inspired by the 1930 FIFA World Cup. Announced for 23 August 1930 at the Sarmiento, it was retitled ¿Qué hacemos con el stadium? at the request of the municipal authorities, who feared a diplomatic incident, and banned minutes before its premiere.	
1930	¿Quién hizo la revolución?	Revue	4 November 1930, Sarmiento	Staged outside the regular season, shortly before the company's European tour.	
1931	La revue argentine	Revue	3 February 1931, Le Palace (Paris, France)	Co-written by Luis Bayón Herrera. Presented during the European tour of their company, which had opened in Madrid at the Teatro de la Zarzuela on 12 January 1931. Carlos Gardel joined the performances in Paris.	
1932	2'37" 1/5...	Sainete	9 March 1932, Comedia	Staged by the company of Luis Arata, Leopoldo Simari and José Franco, all three of whom appeared in the cast.	
1932	¡Te acordás, hermano, qué tiempos aquellos!...		10 March 1932, Teatro Buenos Aires	Subtitled "four periods in the life of a successful man"; its title quotes the opening line of "Tiempos viejos". Staged by the company of Enrique Muiño and Elías Alippi, both of whom appeared in the cast. According to Romero, it was based on anecdotes from Muiño's life.	
1932	Los malandrines	Sainete	8 July 1932, Smart	Staged by the company of Pierina Dealessi, Alfredo Camiña, Marcos Caplán and Enrique Serrano, all four of whom appeared in the cast, as did Iris Marga.	
1932	Hay bronca en el "Rivadavia"	Farce	29 July 1932, Comedia	One-act farce set among sailors; staged by the company of Luis Arata, Leopoldo Simari and José Franco, all three of whom appeared in the cast.	
1932	La canción de Buenos Aires		23 September 1932, Comedia	Staged by the company of Luis Arata, Leopoldo Simari and José Franco. Azucena Maizani premiered Romero's tango of the same name, with music by Orestes Cúfaro and Maizani, in it.	
1933	¡La cantina está que arde!	Sainete	8 March 1933, Comedia	Staged by the company of Luis Arata, Leopoldo Simari and José Franco, all three of whom appeared in the cast.	
1933	Los criminales son personas decentes			Cited by Caras y Caretas among the notable productions of the 1933 theatre season.	
Unknown	Academia del idioma				
Unknown	La cena de los neurasténicos				
Unknown	La guardia vieja				
Unknown	El íntegro				
Unknown	Linda la primavera				
Unknown	Los matrimonios				
Unknown	Sofanor en Buenos Aires				
Unknown	El tesoro de la isla Maciel	Sainete		A success, adapted into Romero's film of the same name (1941).	
Unknown	La calle Corrientes			Adapted into Romero's film of the same name (1943).	

== Songs ==
This list includes the songs registered under Romero's name with the Argentine authors' society SADAIC, together with others attributed to him in published sources, and is not complete. Composers are as registered with SADAIC unless another source is cited, and years are those given in the cited sources, usually the year of the song's premiere.

List of songs with lyrics by Manuel Romero, showing composers, year and other relevant details
Title	Music	Year	Notes	Ref
"A mí qué me importa"	Francisco Lomuto			
"Abandonada"	Francisco Canaro		Tango.	
"Amarrete"	Rodolfo Sciammarella		Sung by Sofía Bozán in Romero's film Isabelita (1940).	
"Aquel tapado de armiño"	Enrique Delfino	1929	Tango. Hugo del Carril and Sabina Olmos sang it in the finale of Romero's film La vida es un tango (1939).	
"Aquí, aquí"	Rodolfo Sciammarella			
"Araca, qué perra vida"	Arturo De Bassi		Tango.	
"Bélgica"	Enrique Delfino		Tango. Composed by Delfino after the German invasion of Belgium and originally titled "Belgique"; Romero wrote the lyrics years later for Hugo del Carril, who sang it in Romero's film La vida es un tango (1939).	
"Buenos Aires"	Manuel Jovés	1923	Tango. Premiered by Carlos Morganti in Romero's melodrama En el fango de París, which inaugurated the Teatro Maipo as a theatre. Recorded by Carlos Gardel in 1923 and 1930; Gardel later adopted it as the signature tune of his performances on NBC radio in New York (1933), as did Carlos Di Sarli for his orchestra's radio broadcasts. Hugo del Carril sang it over the opening credits of Romero's film Tres anclados en París (1938).	
"El caballo del pueblo"	Alberto Soifer		Tango.	
"Cadena de amor"	Alberto Soifer		Tango.	
"Callate"	Charlo		Tango.	
"La canción de Buenos Aires"	Orestes Cúfaro; Azucena Maizani	1932	Tango. Premiered by Azucena Maizani on 23 September 1932 at the Teatro de la Comedia, in Romero's play of the same name, staged by the company of Luis Arata, Leopoldo Simari and José Franco. Maizani sang it over the opening credits of ¡Tango! (1933), the first Argentine film made with optical sound. Carlos Gardel recorded it on 23 January 1933.	
"La canción del camino"	Francisco Lomuto			
"Carnaval de antaño"	Sebastián Piana	1929	Tango. Premiered by Sofía Bozán in the revue Buenos Aires prefiere las morochas. Recorded the same year by Carlos Gardel, Ignacio Corsini, Osvaldo Fresedo and Francisco Lomuto, among others; Charlo sang it in Romero's film Carnaval de antaño (1940).	
"Celosa"	Manuel Jovés		Tango.	
"La cepillada"	Héctor Quesada		Milonga.	
"Cielo andaluz"	Arturo González			
"El clavel"	Enrique Delfino		Tango.	
"Cocot de lujo"	Antonio Scatasso		Tango.	
"Cogote"	Alberto Soifer			
"Como las aves"	Francisco Lomuto			
"Corazón del arrabal"	Manuel Jovés		Tango. Recorded by Carlos Gardel.	
"Cortate el pelo"	Fernando Montoni		Tango.	
"Cositas del amor"	Rodolfo Sciammarella		Canción. (Note: Canción (song) was a broad label used in the popular songbooks and sheet music of the period, often without any further indication of genre, and sometimes qualified, as in canción criolla or canción festiva.)	
"Cuando no queda esperanza"	Rodolfo Sciammarella			
"Cuando un viejo se enamora"	Rodolfo Sciammarella		Milonga.	
"Desconfianza"	Edgardo Donato		Tango.	
"El desdeñoso"	Salvador Merico		Tango. Recorded by Charlo with the orchestra of Francisco Canaro for Discos Nacional in 1928.	
"Desensillá hasta que aclare"	Edgardo Donato		Tango.	
"Dime mi amor"	Rodolfo Sciammarella		Tango.	
"Don Segundo Sombra"	Enrique Delfino		Tango.	
"Dos caminos"	Rodolfo Sciammarella			
"Elvira Fernández, vendedora de tienda"	Rodolfo Sciammarella		Canción.	
"Elvira, te quiero"	Rodolfo Sciammarella		Vals. (Note: The vals criollo is the Argentine form of the European waltz, which in the early 20th century became part of the repertoire of both folkloric and tango musicians. When arranged for tango orchestras, it is sometimes called vals tango.)	
"Emberretinao"	Enrique Delfino			
"Estampilla"	Enrique Delfino	1928	Tango. Recorded by Carlos Gardel.	
"¡Gabino!"	Antonio De Bassi		Tango.	
"Guapo sin grupo"	Salvador Merico	1929	Tango. Premiered by Sofía Bozán in the revue Las risas del momento.	
"Guapo y varón"	Enrique Delfino	1937	Tango.	
"La guardia vieja"	Ángel Negri; Julio Pollero			
"¡Haragán!"	Enrique Delfino	1928	Tango. Lyrics co-written with Luis Bayón Herrera. Premiered by Sofía Bozán at the Teatro Sarmiento in 1927, according to José Gobello.	
"Ipanema"	Alberto Soifer			
"Isabelita"	Rodolfo Sciammarella		Vals. Title song of Romero's film Isabelita (1940), in which it was sung by Juan Carlos Thorry, Paulina Singerman, Tito Lusiardo and Sofía Bozán.	
"Largá las penas"	Alberto Soifer	1935	Milonga.	
"La linda"	Gerardo Matos Rodríguez			
"La llorona"	Edgardo Donato			
"Malevaje de antaño"	Enrique Delfino	1930	Tango.	
"La marcha de la Armada"	Alberto Soifer			
"La marcha del foot ball"	Alberto Soifer			
"Mentira"	Rodolfo Sciammarella			
"Mi paraguaya"	Alberto Soifer			
"Mi piba linda"	Rodolfo Sciammarella		Tango.	
"Mi pibe (La chance)"	Enrique Delfino		Tango.	
"Mi provinciana"	Gerardo Matos Rodríguez	1932	Tango.	
"Milonga criolla"	Alberto Soifer			
"Milongón porteño"	Alberto Soifer		Milonga.	
"La montonera"	Enrique Delfino		Vals.	
"La muchacha del circo"	Gerardo Matos Rodríguez	1928	Tango. Sung in Romero's play Gran circo Rivolta, premiered by the company of Enrique Muiño at the Teatro Buenos Aires on 15 June 1928.	
"La muchachada de a bordo"	Rodolfo Sachs; Alberto Soifer			
"Muchachita del campo"	Francisco Lomuto		Tango.	
"Naufragio"	Enrique Delfino			
"Necesito olvidar"	Rodolfo Sciammarella	1942	Tango.	
"¡No es por hablar mal!"	Enrique Delfino	1929	Tango. Premiered by Sofía Bozán in the revue La gran cachada.	
"Noches de Buenos Aires"	Alberto Soifer		Tango.	
"Nubes de humo (Fume compadre)"	Manuel Jovés	1923	Tango. Sung in Romero's play ¡Patotero, rey del bailongo!, premiered by the company of Enrique Muiño and Elías Alippi at the Teatro Buenos Aires on 31 May 1923.	
"Olvidando las penas"	Alberto Soifer			
"Oración criolla"	Alberto Soifer		Tango.	
"Otra copa y se acabó"	Luis Martini			
"Parece que fue ayer"	Enrique Delfino			
"París"	Manuel Jovés	1923	Shimmy. Premiered in Romero's melodrama En el fango de París.	
"Partir lejos"	Rodolfo Sciammarella	1942	Tango.	
"El patotero sentimental"	Manuel Jovés	1922	Tango. Premiered by Ignacio Corsini on 12 May 1922 at the Apolo, in Romero's play El bailarín del cabaret, staged by the company of César Ratti. Its lyrics were incorporated into Romero's film La vida es un tango (1939).	
"¡Pero usa gomina!"	Ricardo Devalque		Lyrics co-written with Luis Bayón Herrera and Ivo Pelay.	
"Pingo mío"	Manuel Jovés	1923	Tango. Sung in Romero's play El ganador de la copa de oro, premiered at the Porteño on 10 August 1923.	
"¡Pobre milonga!"	Manuel Jovés	1923	Tango. Recorded by Carlos Gardel.	
"Pobre soñador"	Edgardo Donato			
"Polvorín"	José Martínez		Tango. Recorded by Carlos Gardel.	
"El prisionero (Rayito de sol)"	Enrique Delfino	1923	Tango. Sung in Romero's play La vuelta de Pirincho, premiered by the company of César Ratti at the Apolo on 16 March 1923.	
"La provinciana"	Manuel Jovés	1922	Tango. Sung, as "La provincianita", in Romero's play El gran premio nacional, premiered by the company of Luis Vittone and Segundo Pomar at the Politeama Argentino on 28 June 1922.	
"Puro espamento"	Francisco Canaro			
"¡Qué hacés, che parisién!"	Enrique Delfino	1930	Tango. Premiered by Sofía Bozán in the revue Aventuras de una criolla en París, by Romero and Luis Bayón Herrera.	
"¡Qué querés con ese loro!"	Enrique Delfino	1929	Tango. Premiered by Sofía Bozán in the revue ¡S. E. está que arde!.	
"Qué tengo yo"	Alberto Soifer			
"Queja de amor"	Alberto Soifer			
"Quemá esas cartas"	Raúl de los Hoyos		Tango.	
"Radio Bar"	Alberto Soifer		Foxtrot.	
"Recuerdos de bohemia"	Enrique Delfino	1935	Tango.	
"El rey del cabaret"	Enrique Delfino	1923	Tango. Premiered in Romero's sainete of the same name on 21 April 1923. Recorded by Carlos Gardel.	
"Riachuelo"	Alberto Soifer			
"La ribera"	Alberto Soifer	1937	Tango.	
"Rosa, poneme una ventosa"	Enrique Delfino			
"El rosal"	Gerardo Matos Rodríguez		Canción. From the film Las luces de Buenos Aires, in which Romero supervised its performance as co-author.	
"¡Se viene la maroma!"	Enrique Delfino	1928	Tango.	
"La serrana"	Gerardo Matos Rodríguez			
"Siempre unidos"	Alberto Soifer			
"Sin rumbo"	Salvador Merico			
"El Taita del arrabal"	José Padilla	1922	Tango. Lyrics co-written with Luis Bayón Herrera, according to Horacio Ferrer. Its lyrics were incorporated into Romero's film La vida es un tango (1939).	
"Tango amigo"	Francisco Lomuto	1939	Tango.	
"¡Tango porteño!"	Francisco Pracánico	1925	Tango. Recorded by Carlos Gardel.	
"Tiempos nuevos"	Edgardo Donato		Tango.	
"Tiempos viejos"	Francisco Canaro	1926	Tango. Premiered by José Muñiz in the revue La Maravillosa Revista at the Teatro Ópera; Francisco Canaro composed the music at Romero's insistence, shortly before leaving for Europe. Its story inspired Romero's play and film Los muchachos de antes no usaban gomina (1937), in which it was sung by Hugo del Carril in his screen debut. It was also featured in Romero's films La rubia Mireya (1948), sung by Antonio Maida with the orchestra of Manuel Pizarro, and El tango vuelve a París (1948), sung by Alberto Castillo with adapted lyrics.	
"Tomala con soda"	Enrique Delfino		Tango.	
"Tomo y obligo"	Carlos Gardel	1931	Tango. The only song Gardel composed for Las luces de Buenos Aires, in which he sang it in a café scene accompanied by Julio De Caro, Pedro Laurenz and Francisco De Caro. Audiences demanded that the reel be rewound to repeat the scene, which set a model for later tango scenes in Argentine cinema.	
"Tres recuerdos"	Rodolfo Sciammarella			
"Triunfar"	Alberto Soifer			
"Valencia"	Manuel Pisarro			
"El vino triste"	Juan D'Arienzo	1939	Tango. Niní Marshall sang it in Romero's film Yo quiero ser bataclana (1941), accompanied by Juan D'Arienzo and his orchestra.	
"La visita"	Rodolfo Sciammarella		Guajira.	
"Vive como quieras"	Rodolfo Sciammarella			
"Las vueltas de la vida"	Francisco Canaro	1928	Tango.	
"Yo quiero ser bataclana"	Rodolfo Sciammarella			
"Yo soy así"	Fernando Montoni			
"El zorzal"	Alberto Soifer			

== See also ==
- List of public domain tangos

== Notes ==
=== Bibliography ===
- Del Priore, Oscar; Amuchástegui, Irene (1998). Cien tangos fundamentales (in Spanish). Buenos Aires: Aguilar. ISBN 978-950-511-379-8 – via Internet Archive.
- Demaría, Gonzalo (2011). La revista porteña. Teatro efímero entre dos revoluciones (1890-1930) (PDF) (in Spanish). Buenos Aires: Instituto Nacional del Teatro. ISBN 978-987-9433-90-4.
- Di Núbila, Domingo (1960a). Historia del cine argentino. Tomo I (in Spanish). Buenos Aires: Cruz de Malta.
- Di Núbila, Domingo (1960b). Historia del cine argentino. Tomo II (in Spanish). Buenos Aires: Cruz de Malta.
- España, Claudio (2005). "El cine argentino, 1945-1965: del clasicismo a la modernidad". Historia general del arte en la Argentina. Tomo X (PDF) (in Spanish). Buenos Aires: Academia Nacional de Bellas Artes. pp. 17–94. ISBN 950-612-005-6.
- Ferrer, Horacio (1998). La epopeya del tango cantado (in Spanish). Vol. 1: Historia. Buenos Aires: Manrique Zago. ISBN 987-509-043-3 – via Internet Archive.
- Finkielman, Jorge (2004). The Film Industry in Argentina: An Illustrated Cultural History. McFarland & Company, Inc. ISBN 978-0-7864-1628-8 – via Internet Archive.
- García Candela, Lautaro (September 2023). "Los años 30 - Ferreyra, Romero, Saslavsky". La vida útil (in Spanish) (6). Córdoba: 38–55. ISSN 2618-5318.
- Gobello, José (2009). Todo tango (in Spanish). Buenos Aires: Ediciones Libertador. ISBN 978-987-1269-96-9 – via Internet Archive.
- Insaurralde, Andrés (1994). Manuel Romero. Los directores del cine argentino (in Spanish). Buenos Aires: Centro Editor de América Latina. ISBN 950-25-3170-1.
- Karush, Matthew B. (2013). Cultura de clase. Radio y cine en la creación de una Argentina dividida (1920-1946) (in Spanish). Translated by Paola Cortés-Rocca. Buenos Aires: Ariel. ISBN 978-987-1496-63-1.
- Kriger, Clara; Portela, Alejandra, eds. (1997). Diccionario de realizadores (in Spanish). Buenos Aires: Ediciones del Jilguero. ISBN 987-95786-3-5 – via Internet Archive.
- Manrupe, Raúl; Portela, María Alejandra (2001). Un diccionario de films argentinos (1930-1995) (in Spanish). Buenos Aires: Corregidor. ISBN 950-05-0896-6 – via Internet Archive.
- Peña, Fernando Martín (2012). Cien años de cine argentino (eBook) (in Spanish). Buenos Aires: Editorial Biblos. ISBN 978-987-691-098-9.
- Posadas, Abel; Speroni, Marta; Landro, Mónica (2015). Cine y novela. Imágenes argentinas del siglo XX. Volumen III (PDF) (in Spanish). Buenos Aires; Los Angeles: Argus-a. ISBN 978-987-28621-8-3.
- Seibel, Beatriz, ed. (2012). Antología de obras de teatro argentino desde sus orígenes a la actualidad. Tomo 9 (1911–1920). Obras del siglo XX: 2ª década - I (PDF). Historia teatral (in Spanish). Buenos Aires: Instituto Nacional del Teatro. ISBN 978-987-28375-4-9.
- Seibel, Beatriz, ed. (2017). Antología de obras de teatro argentino desde sus orígenes a la actualidad. Tomo XIV (1921–1930). Obras del siglo XX: 3ª década - III. Comedias (PDF). Historia teatral (in Spanish). Buenos Aires: Instituto Nacional del Teatro. ISBN 978-987-3811-39-5.
- Tarruella, Rodrigo (7 April 2021). "Manuel Romero. Entierro y quema en el día de la primavera" (in Spanish). Originally published in the book Cine Argentino – La otra historia, compiled by Sergio Wolf (Ediciones Letra Buena, 1992), and later included in the collection Jugar (La luz de otra cosa). Textos críticos de Rodrigo Tarruella (BAFICI, 2009). Buenos Aires: Taipei.
