= Aída Olivier =

Argentine actress

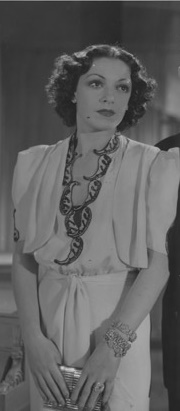
Aída Olivier

Aída Olivier (1911, Buenos Aires - 2 August 1998, Buenos Aires) was an Argentine dancer, vedette and actress of cinema and theatre.

== Biography ==
Olivier was of French ancestry. She was notable for her dance interpretations, especially in the Teatro Maipo during the 1920s and 1930s. She made her cinema debut in 1935 in the film Buenos Aires Nights, directed by Manuel Romero and two years later appeared in Busco un marido para mi mujer under director Arturo S. Mom. In the 1930s, she was in a relationship with Pepe Arias, appearing with him in Maestro Levita (1938).

After Arturo García Buhr ended a romance with Tita Merello, Olivier and Buhr became a couple in 1950. Pursued by the government of Juan Perón as a result of her political convictions, they escaped to Chile in 1951 and settled in Uruguay before returning to Argentina in 1955 after the fall of the government. Their relationship ended with Buhr's suicide on 4 October 1995.

Olivier died by natural causes in Buenos Aires in 1998. She was buried in the pantheon of SADAIC for Argentinian Association of Actors at the Cemetery of the Chacarita.

== Theatre ==
- The coral (1933)
- Varied magazines (1935)
- The crazy hour (1938) and New Broom sweeps (1938), with Pepe Arias, Marcos Caplán, Lely Morel, Ángela Cuenca and Alicia Barrié.
- Confession, with Gloria Guzmán, Azucena Maizani, María Esther Ranges, Pepe Arias and Alejandro Farías
- Playing happens the life (1939), with Carlos Ramírez, Severo Fernández, and the company of Luis César Amadori
- Decimelo With music! (1940)
- Three things there is in the life! (1940)
- Quo vadis Argentinus (1944)
- My beloved daughters (1944)
- The invasion of the good humour (1944)
- There are “dreams" that are mules! (1946) with Thelma Carló, Marcos Caplán, Sofía Bozán, Dringue Farías, Gloria Ramírez and Mario Fortuna
- That fry to walk if helmet! (1946).
- The Petite Hutte (1951)
- With water in the hands (1951)
- The small cabana (1951)
- Rigoberto (1951)
- The man of the umbrella (1957), with Arturo García Buhr, Helena Cortesina and Juan Serrador.
- My woman, the Swede and I (1967)
- We two (1994)

== Filmography ==
- My woman, the Swedish and I (1967)
- Mi novia es un fantasma (1944)
- I look for a husband for my woman (1938)
- Master Levita (1938)
- Buenos Aires Nights (1935)
