= List of Argentine films of 1936 =

A list of films produced in Argentina in 1936:

Argentine films of 1936
Title	Director	Release	Genre
A - Z
Amalia	Luis José Moglia Barth	8 July	Drama
Ayúdame a vivir	José A. Ferreyra	26 August	Musical, Drama
La canción de la ribera	Julio Irigoyen		
Canillita	Lisandro de la Tea and Manuel Roneima	26 March	Musical
Compañeros	Gerardo Húttula	17 April	Comedy
El conventillo de la Paloma	Leopoldo Torres Ríos	24 September	Comedy
Don Quijote del Altillo	Manuel Romero	3 June	Comedy
¡Goal!	Luis José Moglia Barth	14 October	Sports
Juan Moreira	Nelo Cosimi	17 September	Historical, Action
Loco lindo	Arturo S. Mom	13 May	Comedy
Mi Buenos Aires querido	Julio Irigoyen		Musical
La muchachada de a bordo	Manuel Romero	5 February	Comedy
New Port	Luis César Amadori and Mario Soffici	12 February	Musical, Drama
Poncho blanco	Francisco Pablo Donadío	12 August	Drama
Radio Bar	Manuel Romero	10 September	Musical
Santos Vega	Luis José Moglia Barth	17 September	Drama
Salvando la humanidad (Nuestros médicos)	Juan Sánchez Rojas	17 February	Documentary
Sombras porteñas	Daniel Tinayre	25 February	Political Drama
Tararira (la bohemia de hoy)	Benjamín Fondané		Musical, Comedy
Vértigo	Emilio Karstulovic and Napy Duclout	11 March	Documentary
Ya tiene comisario el pueblo	Claudio Martínez Paiva and Eduardo Morera	29 October	Comedy
