= Don Quijote del altillo =

1936 film

- Directed by: Manuel Romero
- Written by: Manuel Romero
- Produced by: Alfredo P. Murúa
- Starring: Luis Sandrini; Nuri Montsé
- Cinematography: Francis Boeniger
- Edited by: Daniel Spósito
- Music by: Alberto Soifer
- Distributed by: Lumiton; Sociedad Impresora de Discos Eletrofónicos (SIDE)
- Release date: 1936
- Running time: 65 minutes
- Country: Argentina
- Language: Spanish

Don Quijote del altillo is a 1936 Argentine comedy film of the Golden Age of Argentine cinema directed and written by Manuel Romero. Starring Luis Sandrini and Nuri Montsé.

== Main cast ==
- Luis Sandrini as Eusebio
- Nuri Montsé as Urbana
- Eduardo Sandrini as Martínez
- Aurelia Musto as a Woman in tenancy
- Roberto Blanco as Martínez's son
- Mary Parets as Martínez's daughter
- Luis Novella as a Greengrocer
- Arturo Arcari as a Man in tenancy

== See also ==
- List of works by Manuel Romero
