= Un guapo del 900 (1952 film) =

- Directed by: Lucas Demare; Manuel Romero
- Screenplay by: Ulyses Petit de Murat
- Based on: Un guapo del 900 by Samuel Eichelbaum
- Starring: Pedro Maratea; Milagros de la Vega; Guillermo Battaglia; Nélida Bilbao; Santiago Gómez Cou
- Cinematography: Ricardo Younis
- Music by: George Andreani
- Production company: Lumiton
- Country: Argentina
- Language: Spanish

Un guapo del 900 is an unfinished 1952 Argentine black-and-white film directed by Lucas Demare and Manuel Romero from a script by Ulyses Petit de Murat, based on the play of the same name by Samuel Eichelbaum. Produced by Lumiton, it starred Pedro Maratea, Milagros de la Vega, Guillermo Battaglia, Nélida Bilbao and Santiago Gómez Cou.

== Production ==
Filming took place at the Lumiton studios between May and July 1952. Demare directed for three weeks before leaving for Spain, and Romero took over for one more week, until shooting was halted by the bankruptcy of producer Néstor Maciel Crespo. A total of 120 shots had been filmed. The film was never completed.

Only about 20 minutes of footage were shot, and the material is now lost.

== Cast ==
- Pedro Maratea
- Milagros de la Vega
- Guillermo Battaglia
- Nélida Bilbao
- Santiago Gómez Cou
- Lydia Quintana
- Gregorio Cicarelli
- Federico Mansilla
- Elisardo Santalla
- Ángel Prío
- Luis Otero
- Roberto Durán
- Néstor Deval
- César Fiaschi
- Jorge Villalba

== See also ==
- List of abandoned and unfinished films
- List of lost films
- List of works by Manuel Romero
