= Women Who Work (1938 film) =

Mujeres que trabajan
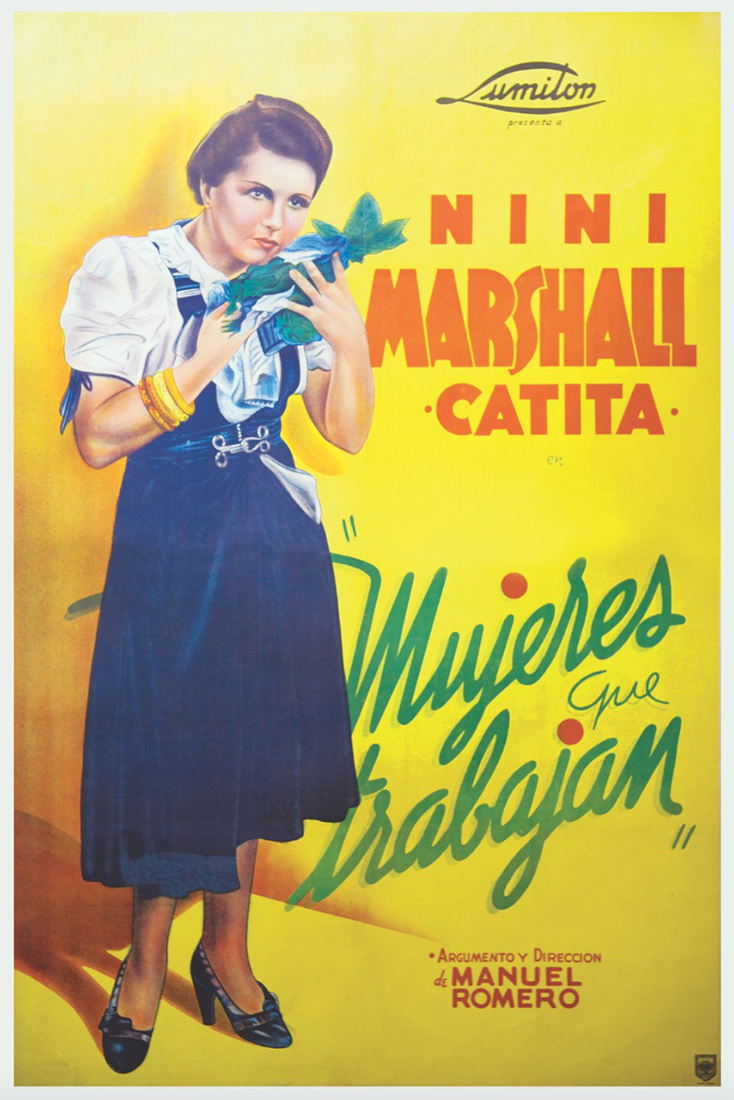
- Theatrical release poster
- Directed by: Manuel Romero
- Written by: Manuel Romero
- Starring: Niní Marshall; Mecha Ortiz; Tito Lusiardo
- Music by: Alberto Soiffer; Francisco Balaguer
- Production company: Lumiton
- Release date: July 6, 1938 (Cine Monumental)
- Running time: 77 minutes
- Country: Argentina
- Language: Spanish

Women Who Work (Spanish: Mujeres que trabajan) is a 1938 Argentine comedy film drama directed by Manuel Romero, a notable title of the Golden Age of Argentine cinema. The film premiered in Buenos Aires and starred Tito Lusiardo.

In a 2022 poll of The 100 Greatest Films of Argentine Cinema presented at the Mar del Plata International Film Festival, the film reached number 49.

== Cast ==
- Mecha Ortiz... Ana María del Solar
- Tito Lusiardo ... Lorenzo Ramos
- Niní Marshall ... Catita
- Pepita Serrador ... Luisa
- Alicia Barrié ... Clara
- Fernando Borel ... Carlos Suárez Roldán
- Sabina Olmos ... Elvira
- Alita Román... Anita
- Mary Parets ... Marta Suárez Roldán
- Enrique Roldán ... Andrés Stanley
- Hilda Sour ... Dolores Campos
- Alímedes Nelson ... Emilia
- María Vitaliani ... Doña Petrona
- Berta Aliana ... Dora
- Alicia Aymont ... Mrs. Suárez Roldán

== See also ==
- List of works by Manuel Romero
