= Historia de crímenes =

- Directed by: Manuel Romero
- Music by: Miguel Zepeda
- Production company: Lumiton
- Release date: 1942
- Country: Argentina
- Language: Spanish

Historia de crímenes is a 1942 Argentine thriller film written and directed by Manuel Romero during the Golden Age of Argentine cinema. It follows the story of a banker who, upon falling in love with a dancer, is driven to commit several murders.

== Cast ==
- Narciso Ibáñez Menta
- Zully Moreno
- Nury Montse
- Severo Fernandez
- Maria Esther Buschiazzo
- Osvaldo Miranda
- Alfredo Jordan
- Bernardo Perrone
- Amalia Bernabe

== See also ==
- List of works by Manuel Romero
