= When Do You Commit Suicide? =

When Do You Commit Suicide? may refer to:

- When Do You Commit Suicide? (1931 film), a 1931 American comedy film
- When Do You Commit Suicide? (1932 film), a 1932 American comedy film
- When Do You Commit Suicide? (1953 film), a 1953 French comedy film
