= Un guapo del 900 =

Un guapo del 900 may refer to:

- Un guapo del 900 (play), an Argentine play by Samuel Eichelbaum
- Un guapo del 900 (1952 film), an Argentine unfinished film by Lucas Demare and Manuel Romero
- Un guapo del 900 (1960 film), an Argentine film by Leopoldo Torre Nilsson
- Un guapo del 900 (1971 film), an Argentine film by Lautaro Murúa
