= Outside the Law (1937 film) =

1937 film by Manuel Romero

Fuera de la ley
- Directed by: Manuel Romero
- Written by: Manuel Romero
- Starring: Luis Arata; José Gola; Irma Córdoba; Susy Derqui
- Cinematography: Gerhard Huttula
- Edited by: Alfredo Traverso
- Music by: George Andreani
- Distributed by: Lumiton
- Release date: 1937
- Country: Argentina
- Language: Spanish

Outside the Law (Spanish: Fuera de la ley) is a 1937 Argentine thriller film directed and written by Manuel Romero. The film premiered on 12 May 1940 in the United States. The film starred José Gola, Luis Arata, Roberto Blanco, and Irma Córdoba

One of the most iconic films of the Golden Age of Argentine cinema, it was selected as the tenth greatest Argentine film of all time in a poll conducted by the Museo del Cine Pablo Ducrós Hicken in 1977.

== Plot ==
Juan Robles, the son of a police superintendent, becomes involved in crime and is sentenced to a prison term. After being released, he falls in love with Emilia, a young woman raised by his parents, who rejects him. Obsessed with her, Juan and some fellow gangsters kidnap Emilia's little daughter. Pedro Robles, his father, ask his superiors to take the case himself in order to confront his deranged son.

== Cast ==
- Luis Arata as Pedro Robles
- José Gola as Juan Robles
- Irma Córdoba as Emilia
- Susy Derqui as Flora
- María Esther Buschiazzo as Juan Robles' mother
- Marcos Caplán as Agapito
- Pedro Maratea as Enrique Varela
- Marcelo Ruggero as Chichilo
- Martín Zabalúa as Chief of Police
- María Vitaliani as Chichilo's wife
- Pedro Laxalt as Roberto Achával
- Roberto Blanco as Ñato
- Rayito de Sol as Susana Achával
- Gerardo Rodríguez as Turkish
- Jorge Lanza as Giménez
- Malisa Zini as Babysitter (uncredited)

== See also ==
- List of works by Manuel Romero
