= Muchachas que estudian =

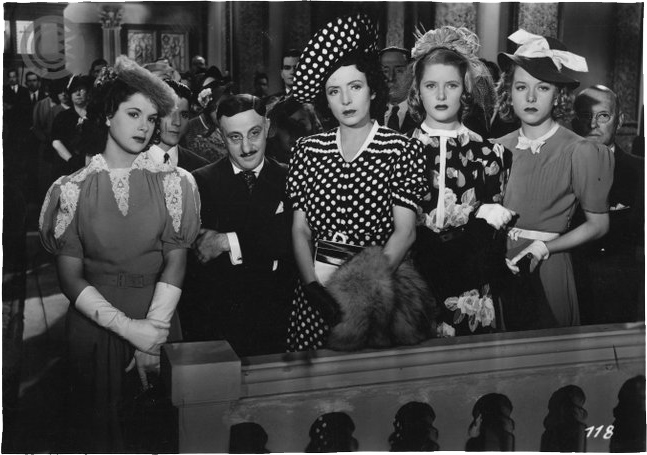
- Delia Garcés, Enrique Serrano, Sofía Bozán, Ana May and Mary Dormal in Muchachas que estudian
- Directed by: Manuel Romero
- Written by: Manuel Romero
- Produced by: Manuel Romero
- Starring: Luis Sandrini
- Cinematography: León Schaffer
- Edited by: Juan Soffici
- Distributed by: Lumiton
- Release date: September 6, 1939
- Running time: 78 minutes
- Country: Argentina
- Language: Spanish

Muchachas que estudian is a 1939 Argentine comedy film directed and written by Manuel Romero during the Golden Age of Argentine cinema. The film premiered on September 6, 1939, in Buenos Aires and starred Sofía Bozán, Enrique Serrano and Delia Garcés.

== Cast ==
- Sofía Bozán ... Luisa
- Enrique Serrano ... Professor Castro
- Alicia Vignoli ... Mercedes
- Delia Garcés ... Alcira
- Pepita Serrador ... Ana Del Valle
- Alicia Barrié ... Isabel
- Ernesto Raquén ... Ricardo López
- Enrique Roldán ... Emilio
- Ana May ... Dolores
- Perla Mux ... Lucy
- Carmen del Moral ... Magda
- Carlos Tajes ... Pedro
- Roberto Blanco ... Tolo
- Armando Durán ... Carlos
- Mary Dormal ... Isabel's Mother
- Alberto Terrones ... Isabel's Father

== See also ==
- List of works by Manuel Romero
