= I Want to Be a Chorus Girl =

- Theatrical release poster
- Directed by: Manuel Romero
- Written by: Manuel Romero
- Starring: Niní Marshall; Juan Carlos Thorry; Alicia Barrié
- Cinematography: Hugo Chiesa
- Edited by: Juan Soffici
- Production company: Lumiton
- Distributed by: Lumiton
- Release date: 30 April 1941
- Running time: 80 minutes
- Country: Argentina
- Language: Spanish

I Want to Be a Chorus Girl (Spanish:Yo quiero ser bataclana) is a 1941 Argentine musical comedy film of the Golden Age of Argentine cinema, directed by Manuel Romero and starring Niní Marshall, Juan Carlos Thorry and Alicia Barrié.

The film's art direction was by Ricardo J. Conord.

== Cast ==
- Niní Marshall as Catita
- Juan Carlos Thorry as Carlos
- Alicia Barrié as Julia Reyes
- Sabina Olmos as Elena
- Enrique Roldán as Jorge
- Segundo Pomar as Don Pepet
- Roberto Blanco as Linares
- Rosa Martín as Susy
- Estela Taylor as Emilia
- Mercedes Quintana as herself
- Juan D'Arienzo as himself

== See also ==
- List of works by Manuel Romero

== Bibliography ==
- Adrián Pérez Melgosa. Cinema and Inter-American Relations: Tracking Transnational Affect. Routledge, 2012.
