= The Favorite (1935 film) =

- Directed by: Manuel Romero
- Written by: Manuel Romero; Luis Bayón Herrera
- Starring: Pedro Quartucci
- Cinematography: Francisco Múgica
- Edited by: Francisco Múgica
- Music by: Alberto Soifer
- Distributed by: Lumiton
- Release date: August 15, 1935
- Country: Argentina
- Language: Spanish

The Favorite (Spanish:El caballo del pueblo) is a 1935 Argentine musical comedy film of the Golden Age of Argentine cinema directed and written by Manuel Romero with Luis Bayón Herrera. It is a tango film and premiered on August 15, 1935.

The cinematography and editing was performed by Francisco Múgica.

== Main cast ==
- Olinda Bozán as Ruperta
- Irma Córdoba as Esther Peña
- Enrique Serrano as Bebe Viñas
- Pedro Quartucci as Flaco
- Juan Carlos Thorry as Roberto Campos
- Juan Mangiante as Peña
- Juan Porta as Trainer
- Eduardo Lema as Lemos, the jockey
- Vicente Forastieri as Contreras
- N. Fornaresio as Peon
- Lalo Malcolm as a Thug (billed as L. Malcom)
- Nicolás Werenchuk as José Guzmán (billed as N. Werenchuk)
- Mary Parets as Trainer's daughter
- Ángel Magaña as Young Man #1 in party (uncredited)
- Pedro Maratea as Young Man #2 in party (uncredited)
- Margarita Padín as Young Woman in show (uncredited)

== See also ==
- List of works by Manuel Romero
