= La muchachada de a bordo =

- Directed by: Manuel Romero
- Written by: Manuel Romero
- Starring: Luis Sandrini; Tito Lusiardo
- Cinematography: Jorge C. Lemos; Luis Romero
- Edited by: Francisco Múgica
- Music by: Manuel Romero(theme); Rodolfo Sachs; Alberto Soifer(march)
- Distributed by: Lumiton
- Release date: 1936
- Running time: 78 minutes
- Country: Argentina
- Language: Spanish

La muchachada de a bordo (English language:Boys on Board) is a 1936 Argentine comedy film directed and written by Manuel Romero during the Golden Age of Argentine cinema. The film starred Luis Sandrini and Tito Lusiardo. The film was edited by Francisco Múgica.

== Cast ==
- Luis Sandrini
- Tito Lusiardo
- Santiago Arrieta
- José Gola
- Benita Puértolas
- Alicia Barrié
- Juan Mangiante

== See also ==
- List of works by Manuel Romero
