= Juan Soffici =

Argentine film editor

- Occupation: Film editor

Juan Soffici was an Argentine film editor. He was known for his work in the late 1930s and early 1940s for Lumiton.

== Selected filmography ==
- Cadetes de San Martín (1937)
- La chismosa (1938)
- Three Argentines in Paris (1938)
- Such Is Life (1939)
- The Model and the Star (1939)
- Margarita, Armando y su padre (1939
- Muchachas que estudian (1939)
- Isabelita (1940)
- Honeymoon in Rio (1940)
- The Englishman of the Bones (1940)
- Medio millón por una mujer (1940)
- I Want to Be a Chorus Girl (1941)
- You Are My Love (1941)
- El tesoro de la isla Maciel (1941)
- Persona honrada se necesita (1941)
- Adolescencia (1942)
