= Benita Puértolas =

Argentine actress

Benita Puértolas (died 4 September 1968, in Buenos Aires) was an Argentine film and theatre actress. She was the mother of the film actor Héctor Coire.

== Filmography ==
- Lo que le pasó a Reynoso (1955)
- La mujer desnuda (1955)
- El complejo de Felipe (1951)
- La comedia inmortal (1951)
- Avivato (1949)
- El extraño caso de la mujer asesinada (1949)
- Los secretos del buzón (1948)
- Recuerdos de un ángel (1948)
- Siete para un secreto (1947)
- Soy un infeliz (1946)
- El Capitán Pérez (1946)
- Cinco besos (1945)
- Mi novia es un fantasma (1944)
- Eclipse de sol (1943)
- Los ojos más lindos del mundo (1943)
- Locos de verano (1942)
- Boina blanca (1941)
- Corazón de turco (1940)
- Los muchachos se divierten (1940)
- Entre el barro (1939)
- Jettatore (1938)
- Los locos del cuarto piso (1937)
- La vuelta de Rocha (1937)
- Radio Bar (1936)
- Poncho blanco (1936)
- Canillita (1936)
- La muchachada de a bordo (1936)
- Los tres berretines (1933)
