= Ven mi corazón te llama =

- Directed by: Manuel Romero
- Written by: Manuel Romero
- Produced by: Lumiton
- Starring: Elvira Ríos, Tito Lusiardo, Alicia Barrié
- Cinematography: Pablo Tabernero
- Edited by: Antonio Rampoldi
- Music by: Rodolfo Sciammarella
- Release date: 9 September 1942
- Running time: 89 min
- Country: Argentina
- Language: Spanish

Ven mi corazón te llama is a 1942 Argentine film directed by Manuel Romero during the Golden Age of Argentine cinema.

== Cast ==
- Elvira Ríos as Sombra Rey
- Tito Lusiardo as Goyo Martínez
- Alicia Barrié as Lucila Cáceres
- Elena Lucena as Pocha
- Enrique Roldán as Arturo Campos
- Segundo Pomar as Julián Castro
- Alberto Terrones as Police Superintendent
- Vicente Forastieri as López
- Antonio Capuano as Policeman Auxiliary
- Juan José Porta as Judge

== See also ==
- List of works by Manuel Romero
