= A Light in the Window (film) =

1942 horror film by Manuel Romero

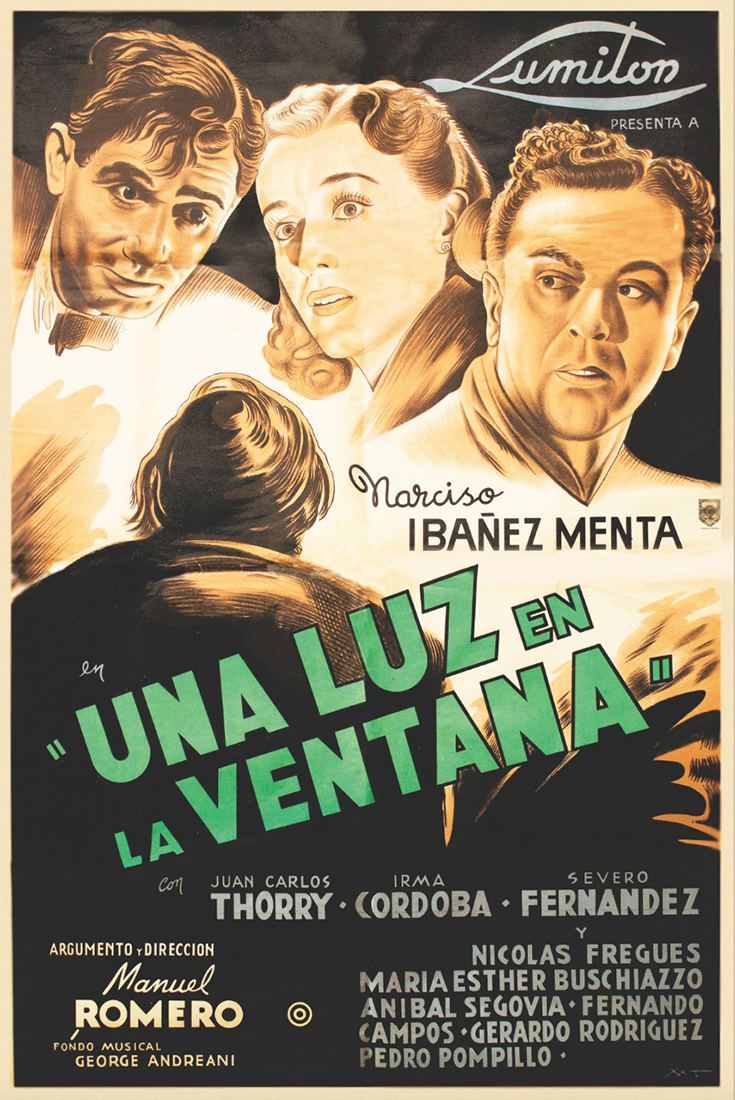
- Theatrical release poster
- Directed by: Manuel Romero
- Written by: Manuel Romero
- Starring: Narciso Ibáñez Menta; Irma Córdoba; Juan Carlos Thorry
- Cinematography: Alfredo Traverso
- Edited by: Antonio Rampoldi
- Music by: George Andreani
- Production company: Lumiton
- Distributed by: Lumiton
- Release date: 12 May 1942
- Running time: 72 minutes
- Country: Argentina
- Language: Spanish

A Light in the Window (Spanish: Una luz en la ventana) is a 1942 Argentine horror thriller film of the Golden Age of Argentine cinema, directed by Manuel Romero and starring Narciso Ibáñez Menta, Irma Córdoba and Juan Carlos Thorry. It is considered to be the first Argentine horror movie.

== Plot ==
Angélica, a young nurse (Irma Córdoba) is hired by an elderly woman (María Ester Buschiazzo) to care for her in an isolated and mysterious house in the countryside. Unknown to her, Angélica will be the victim of a nefarious plot conceived by the old woman's son, the acromegalic doctor Herman (Narciso Ibáñez Menta), assisted by a sinister colleague (Nicolás Fregues) and their henchmen. A landowner (Juan Carlos Thorry) and his funny servant (Severo Fernández) become involved by accident and go to the rescue.

== Cast ==
- Narciso Ibáñez Menta as Dr. Herman
- Irma Córdoba as Angélica
- Juan Carlos Thorry as Mario
- Severo Fernández as Juan
- Nicolás Fregues as Dr. Roberts
- María Esther Buschiazzo as Mrs. Herman
- Pedro Pompillo as The Dumb
- Aníbal Segovia as Railway watchman
- Gerardo Rodríguez as Police officer
- Fernando Campos as Police sergeant

== See also ==
- List of works by Manuel Romero

== Bibliography ==
- Rist, Peter H. (2014) Historical Dictionary of South American Cinema. Rowman & Littlefield.
