= Such Is Life (1939 film) =

1939 film

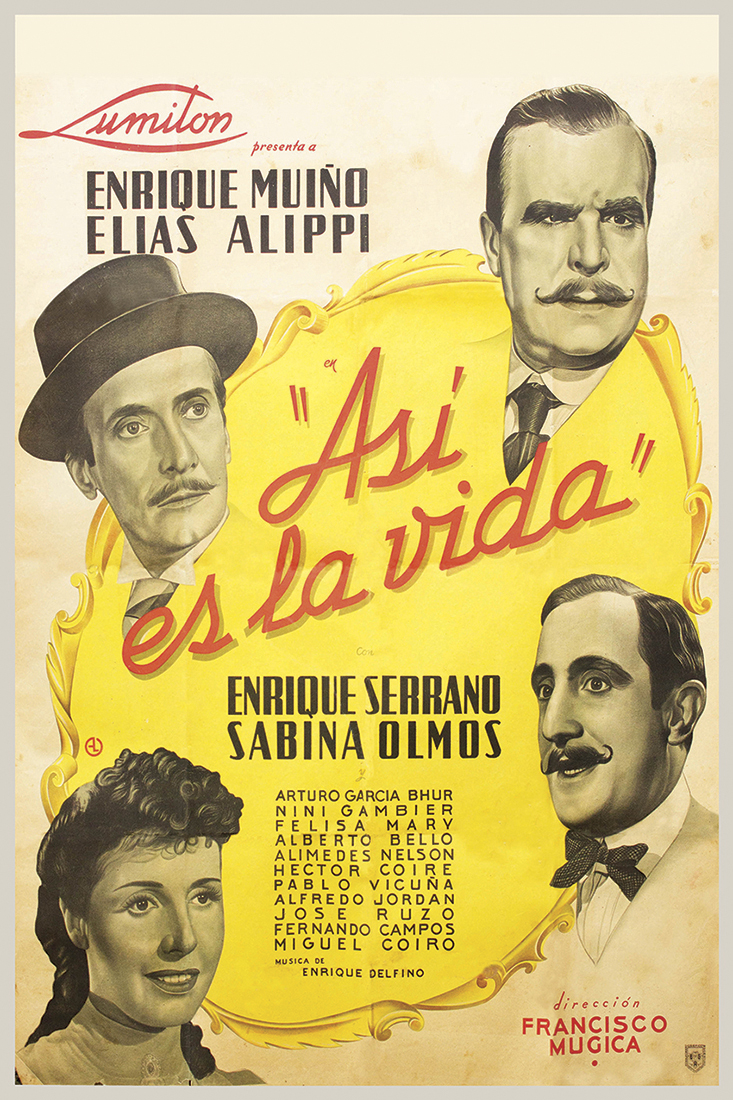
- Theatrical release poster
- Directed by: Francisco Múgica
- Written by: Luis Marquina
- Based on: Así es la vida by Nicolás de las Llanderas and Arnaldo Malfatti
- Starring: Enrique Muiño; Elías Alippi; Enrique Serrano; Sabina Olmos
- Cinematography: José María Beltrán
- Edited by: Juan Soffici
- Music by: Enrique Delfino
- Production company: Lumiton
- Release date: 5 August 1939
- Running time: 105 minutes
- Country: Argentina
- Language: Spanish

Such Is Life (Spanish: Así es la vida) is a 1939 Argentine melodrama film directed by Francisco Múgica and starring Enrique Muiño, Elías Alippi, Enrique Serrano and Sabina Olmos. It is one of the most celebrated films of the Golden Age of Argentine cinema. Based on a successful play of the same title by Nicolás de las Llanderas and Arnaldo Malfatti, it focuses on the history of a bourgeois family from Buenos Aires from the beginning of the 20th century to the present. A Mexican remake Orange Blossom for Your Wedding was released in 1950.

== Cast ==
- Enrique Muiño
- Elías Alippi
- Enrique Serrano
- Arturo García Buhr
- Sabina Olmos
- Alberto Bello
- Myrta Bonillas
- Fernando Campos
- Héctor Coire
- Niní Gambier
- Alfredo Jordan
- Felisa Mary
- Alímedes Nelson
- José Ruzzo
- Pablo Vicuña

== Style ==
The style of the film was an important turning point in Argentine cinema, since until then the films mainly focused on the working classes and the world of tango. As noted by researcher Alejandro Kelly Hopfenblatt:

From the point of view of the parents who see their children grow up and leave home to create their own life stories, an ode to work and family as fundamental supports in times of modernization of society was proposed. The main novelty introduced to the national cinematography was the appearance of a new universe represented from the protagonism of the bourgeoisie, looking for empathy and identification of new spectators.

== Release and reception ==
The film premiered at the Cine Monumental in Buenos Aires on 19 July 1939. It received universal acclaim from critics, who at the time claimed that national cinema should broaden the subjects it represented in order to attract audiences outside of the working class.

In 1977, during the last civil–military dictatorship, the government banned the film from being broadcast on television. According to Domingo Di Núbila, this was probably due to a scene in which the Arturo García Buhr's character proudly defends his adherence to socialism.

It was selected as the fourth greatest Argentine film of all time in a poll conducted by the Museo del Cine Pablo Ducrós Hicken in 1977, while it ranked 29th in the 2000 edition. In a new version of the survey organized in 2022 by the specialized magazines La vida util, Taipei and La tierra quema, presented at the Mar del Plata International Film Festival, the film reached the 59th position.

== Bibliography ==
- Di Núbila, Domingo (1998). La época de oro. Historia del cine argentino I (in Spanish). Buenos Aires: Ediciones del Jilguero. ISBN 978-987-957-865-0.
