= The Model and the Star =

La modelo y la estrella
- Theatrical release poster
- Directed by: Manuel Romero
- Written by: Manuel Romero
- Produced by: Manuel Romero
- Starring: Alita Román; Fernando Borel; June Marlowe; Marcelo Ruggero
- Cinematography: Hugo Chiesa
- Edited by: Juan Soffici
- Music by: Alberto Soifer
- Production company: Lumiton
- Release date: March 15, 1939
- Running time: 91 minutes
- Country: Argentina
- Language: Spanish

The Model and the Star (Spanish: La modelo y la estrella) is a 1939 Argentine comedy film directed by Manuel Romero during the Golden Age of Argentine cinema. The film premiered on March 15, 1939 in Buenos Aires and starred Alita Román, Fernando Borel, June Marlowe and Marcelo Ruggero.

== Cast ==
- Alita Román ... Gloria
- Fernando Borel ... Jorge
- June Marlowe ... Barbara
- Marcelo Ruggero ... Nicola
- Juan Mangiante ... Verdier
- Alberto Terrones ... Fiorini
- Jacqueline Taubert ... Georgette
- Juan Porta ... Boss
- Carlos Bertoldi

== See also ==
- List of works by Manuel Romero
