= Alicia Barrié =

Chilean actress

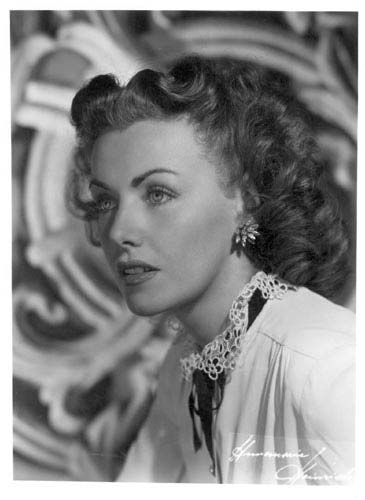
- Born: Sara Ramona Alicia Masriera del Campillo; 7 October 1915; Chile
- Died: 28 September 2002 (aged 86); Longwood, Florida, U.S.
- Occupation: Actress
- Years active: 1933-1949
- Spouse(s): Robert Farmer (1948 - 19??; his death); 1 child

Sara Ramona Alicia Masriera del Campillo (stage name, Alicia Barrié; 7 October 1915 – 28 September 2002) was a Chilean actress who made her acting career in Argentina. Born in Chile, Barrie moved to Buenos Aires with her family and made her acting debut in the 1933 film, Dancing.

After marrying an American, she moved to Mexico, where she filmed "Yo fui una usurpadora", before moving to the United States. She died in Longwood, Florida in 2002.

== Filmography ==
- Yo fui una usurpadora (1950)
- Miguitas en la cama (1949)
- Fascinación (1949)
- An Ideal Husband (1947)
- No salgas esta noche (1946)
- Mi novia es un fantasma (1944)
- Los dos rivales (1944)
- The Mirror (1943)
- Dieciséis años (1943)
- El fabricante de estrellas (1943)
- Pasión imposible (1943)
- Ven mi corazón te llama (1942)
- Tú eres la paz (1942)
- Una novia en apuros (1941)
- Embrujo (1941)
- I Want to Be a Chorus Girl (1941)
- Honeymoon in Rio (1940)
- Mi fortuna por un nieto (1940)
- Los muchachos se divierten (1940)
- La mujer y el jockey (1939)
- Muchachas que estudian (1939)
- Women Who Work (1938)
- Papá Chirola (1937)
- La vuelta de Rocha (1937)
- El pobre Pérez (1937)
- El conventillo de la Paloma (1936)
- Radio Bar (1936)
- La muchachada de a bordo (1936)
- Dancing (1933)
