= Ricardo Conord =

Argentine architect and art director

- Born: Argentina
- Died: 6 August 1982; Argentina
- Other name: Ricardo J. Conord
- Occupations: Architect, Art Director
- Years active: 1933–1959 (film)

Ricardo Conord was an Argentine architect and art director. He designed sets for more than eighty films throughout his career during the Golden Age of Argentine Cinema.

== Selected filmography ==
- Buenos Aires Nights (1935)
- Mateo (1937)
- Three Argentines in Paris (1938)
- Honeymoon in Rio (1940)
- I Want to Be a Chorus Girl (1941)
- The Minister's Daughter (1943)
- Valentina (1950)

== Bibliography ==
- Finkielman, Jorge. The Film Industry in Argentina: An Illustrated Cultural History. McFarland, 24 Dec 2003.
