= Buenos Aires Nights =

1935 film

- Directed by: Manuel Romero
- Written by: Luis Bayón Herrera; Manuel Romero
- Starring: Tita Merello; Irma Córdoba
- Cinematography: Luis Romero
- Edited by: Francisco Múgica
- Music by: Alberto Soifer
- Distributed by: Lumiton
- Release date: March 27, 1935
- Running time: 75 minutes
- Country: Argentina
- Language: Spanish

Buenos Aires Nights (Spanish:Noches de Buenos Aires) is a 1935 Argentine romantic musical film directed and written by Manuel Romero with Luis Bayón Herrera. It is a tango film from the Golden Age of Argentine cinema and was edited by Francisco Múgica The film's sets were designed by the art director Ricardo J. Conord.

== Cast ==
- Fernando Ochóa
- Tita Merello
- Severo Fernández
- Irma Córdoba
- Enrique Serrano
- Héctor Calcaño
- Fernando Campos
- Tito Climent
- Inés Edmonson
- Juan Mangiante
- Aída Olivier
- Guillermo Pedemonte
- Joaquín Petrocino
- Alfredo Pozzio
- Alberto Soifer

== See also ==
- List of works by Manuel Romero
