= Adiós pampa mía =

1946 film

- Poster
- Directed by: Manuel Romero
- Written by: Manuel Romero
- Produced by: Manuel Romero
- Starring: Alberto Castillo; Francisco Charmiello
- Cinematography: Antonio Merayo
- Edited by: Jorge Gárate
- Music by: Alejandro Gutiérrez del Barrio
- Distributed by: Argentina Sono Film S.A.C.I.
- Release date: 1946
- Running time: 95 minute
- Countries: Argentina; Spain
- Language: Spanish

Adiós pampa mía is a 1946 Argentine romantic drama film of the classical era of Argentine cinema, directed and written by Manuel Romero. The film starred Alberto Castillo and Francisco Charmiello.

== Cast ==
- Alberto Castillo
- Francisco Charmiello
- Víctor Ferrari
- Herminia Franco
- María Esther Gamas
- Perla Mux
- Mercedes Quintana
- Alberto Vila

== See also ==
- List of works by Manuel Romero
