= Gold in Clay =

- Directed by: Luis Bayon Herrera
- Written by: Luis Bayon Herrera
- Produced by: Luis Bayon Herrera
- Starring: Tito Lusiardo
- Release date: 1939
- Running time: 74 minute
- Country: Argentina
- Language: Spanish

Gold in Clay (Spanish: Entre el barro) is a 1939 Argentine musical film directed by Luis Bayon Herrera during the Golden Age of Argentine cinema. The tango film premiered in Buenos Aires and stars Tito Lusiardo.

== Cast ==
- Tito Lusiardo
- Pedro Maratea
- Severo Fernández
- Enrique Roldán
- Benita Puértolas
- Dorita Ferreyro
- Cielito
- Héctor Coire
- Lucía Galán
- Carlos Rosingana
- Vicente Forastieri
- Aída Gómez
- Ernesto Villegas
- Alfredo Pozzio
- Nelly Nolby
