= Carnaval de antaño =

- Directed by: Manuel Romero
- Written by: Manuel Romero
- Starring: Florencio Parravicini
- Cinematography: Jose Maria Beltran
- Edited by: Juan Soffici
- Music by: Alberto Soifer
- Release date: 1940
- Running time: 86 minute
- Country: Argentina
- Language: Spanish

Carnaval de antaño is a 1940 Argentine film directed by Manuel Romero during the Golden Age of Argentine cinema.

== Cast ==
- Florencio Parravicini
- Sofía Bozán
- Sabina Olmos
- Charlo
- Enrique Roldán
- El Cachafaz
- Fernando Campos
- Warly Ceriani

== See also ==
- List of works by Manuel Romero
