= Ue... paisano! =

- Directed by: Manuel Romero
- Written by: Manuel Romero
- Release date: 1953
- Running time: 87 minutes
- Country: Argentina
- Language: Spanish

Ue... paisano! is a 1953 Argentine film directed by Manuel Romero starring Susana Campos, Nicola Paone, Fidel Pintos and Vicente Rubino. Nicola Panoe sang a song with the same title. Ue... paisano! was the last film of Romero's extended career.

== See also ==
- List of works by Manuel Romero
