= When Do You Commit Suicide? (1932 film) =

1932 film

- Directed by: Manuel Romero
- Written by: André Dahl; Saint-Granier; Claudio de la Torre
- Starring: Fernando Soler; Imperio Argentina
- Cinematography: Fred Langenfeld
- Music by: Charles Borel-Clerc; Marcel Lattès
- Production company: Paramount Pictures
- Distributed by: Paramount Pictures
- Release date: April 3, 1932
- Running time: 81 minutes
- Country: United States
- Language: Spanish

When Do You Commit Suicide? (Spanish: ¿Cuándo te suicidas?) is a 1932 American pre-Code comedy film directed by Manuel Romero and starring Fernando Soler and Imperio Argentina. It was made by Paramount Pictures at its Joinville Studios in Paris. It is the Spanish-language version of its 1931 film When Do You Commit Suicide?. Paramount was at the time experimenting in the large-scale production of multilingual films at Joinville.

== Cast ==
- Fernando Soler as Xavier Du Venoux
- Imperio Argentina as Gabi
- Manuel Russell as León Miroll
- Carmen Navasqués as Viuda Damonthal
- José Isbert as Petavey
- María Anaya as Virginia
- Enrique de Rosas as Moisés
- Manuel Vico as Guillard
- Carlos Martínez Baena as Abraham

== See also ==
- List of works by Manuel Romero

== Bibliography ==
- Rist, Peter H. Historical Dictionary of South American Cinema. Rowman & Littlefield, 2014.
