= Ya tiene comisario el pueblo =

- Screenshot
- Directed by: Claudio Martínez Payva
- Written by: Claudio Martínez Payva; Eduardo Morera
- Produced by: Francisco Canaro
- Starring: Paquito Busto
- Cinematography: Bob Roberts
- Music by: Francisco Canaro; Lucio Demare
- Distributed by: Río de la Plata
- Release date: 1936
- Country: Argentina
- Language: Spanish

Ya tiene comisario el pueblo is a 1936 Argentine film directed and written by Claudio Martínez Payva during the Golden Age of Argentine cinema.

== Main cast ==
- Paquito Busto
- Arturo Arcari
- Antonio Daglio
- Roberto Fugazot
- Agustín Irusta
- Alberto Puértolas
- Héctor Quintanilla
- Leonor Rinaldi
- Elisardo Santalla
- Atilio Supparo
- Froilán Varela
