= La vida es un tango =

La Vida es un tango
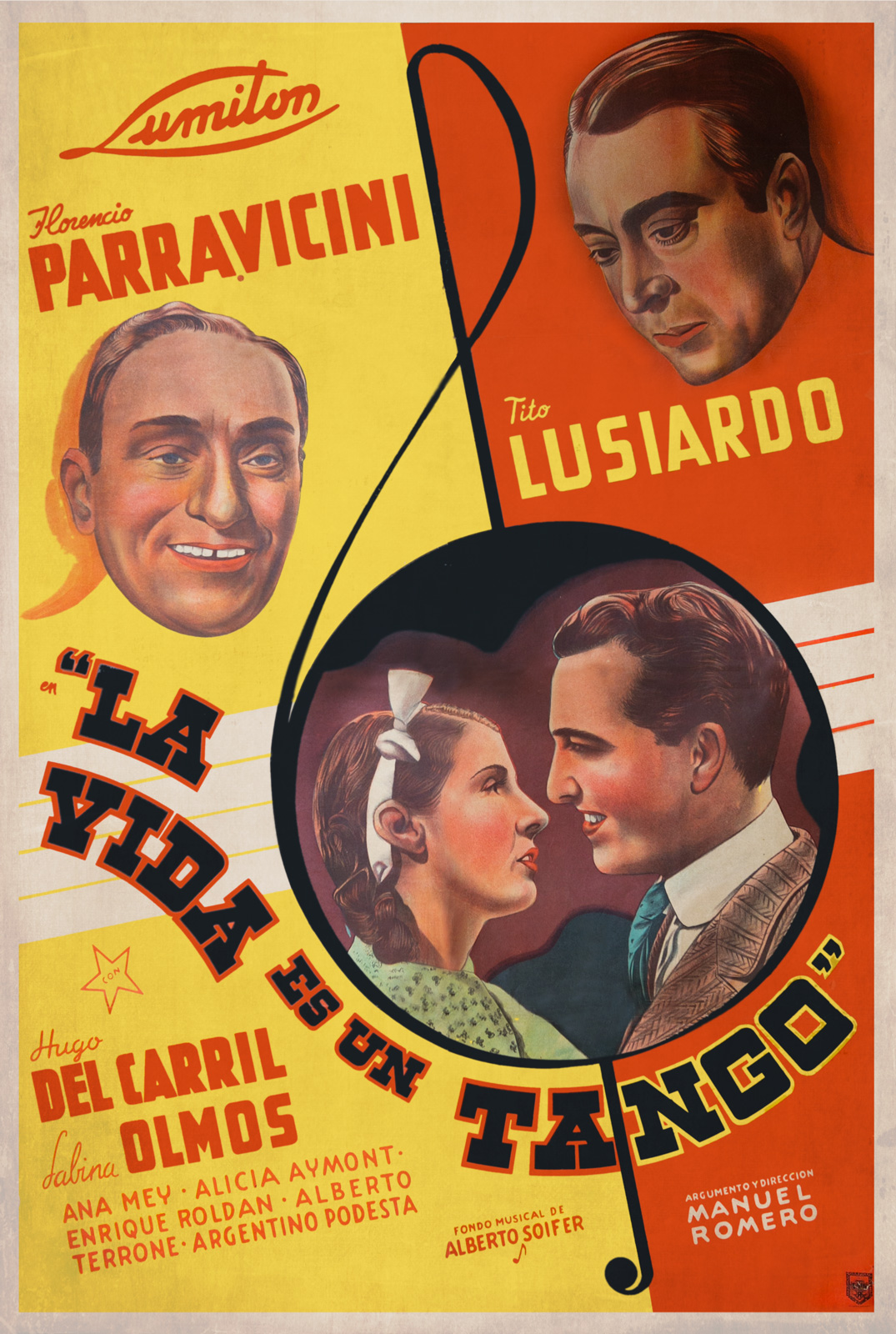
- Directed by: Manuel Romero
- Written by: Manuel Romero
- Produced by: Manuel Romero
- Starring: Tito Lusiardo; Hugo del Carril
- Release date: 1939
- Running time: 87 minutes
- Country: Argentina
- Language: Spanish

La Vida es un tango (Life is a Tango) is a 1939 Argentine musical film directed by Manuel Romero during the Golden Age of Argentine cinema. The tango film starred Tito Lusiardo and Hugo del Carril.

== Cast ==
- Tito Lusiardo
- Hugo del Carril

== See also ==
- List of works by Manuel Romero
