= Irma Córdoba =

Argentine actress

- Born: July 20, 1913; Buenos Aires, Argentina
- Died: May 18, 2008 (aged 94); Buenos Aires, Argentina
- Years active: 1932–1999

Irma Córdoba (July 20, 1913 – May 18, 2008) was an Argentine film actress of the Golden Age of Argentine cinema.

She entered the film industry in 1932 and appeared in over 30 films, spanning 65 years of Argentine film. She appeared in films such as Fuera de la ley 1937 and Atorrante (1939). She retired in 1997.

== Partial filmography ==
- Rapsodia gaucha (1932)
- Buenos Aires Nights (1935)
- The Favorite (1935) – Esther Peña
- Internado (1935)
- El Forastero (1937)
- The Boys of the Old Days didn't use Hair Gel (1937) – Camila Peña
- La Muchacha del circo (1937)
- Fuera de la ley (1937) – Emilia
- Three Argentines in Paris (1938) – Ángela Torres
- Cuatro corazones (1939)
- Atorrante (1941)
- Último refugio (1941)
- Noche de bodas (1942)
- A Light in the Window (1942) – Angélica
- Locos de verano (1942)
- Delirio (1944)
- Deshojando margaritas (1946)
- Christmas with the Poor (1947) – Marta
- Mirad los lirios del campo (1947)
- Cinco gallinas y el cielo (1957)
- Mi marido y mi padrino (1957, TV Series)
- El Festín de Satanás (1958)
- Show Standard Electric (1965, TV Mini-Series)
- Las Locas del conventillo (1966) – Tía Soledad
- Maternidad sin hombres (1968)
- Esta noche... miedo (1970, TV Series)
- La Sonrisa de mamá (1972)
- Me llaman Gorrión (1972, TV Series) – Celia (unknown episodes)
- Me gusta esa chica (1973)
- Separate Tables (1974, TV Movie) – Mrs. Maude Raillon-Bell
- Profesión, ama de casa (1979, TV Series) – Mercedes
- Fabián 2 Mariana 0 (1980, TV Series)
- Bárbara (1980) – La Dama
- Venido a menos (1984) – Memé
- Yolanda Luján (1984, TV Series) – Sara Sotomayor
- Amor prohibido (1986, TV Series) – Remedios
- Stress (1990, TV Series) – Maruca
- El Precio del poder (1992, TV Series) – Mother of Lucio
- Eva Perón (1996) – Marguarita Achaval Junco
- El Mundo contra mí (1997) – Abuela
