= The Mirror (1943 film) =

- Directed by: Francisco Múgica
- Written by: Carlos A. Olivari; Sixto Pondal Ríos
- Starring: Mirtha Legrand; Roberto Airaldi; Alicia Barrié
- Cinematography: Alfredo Traverso
- Edited by: Nello Melli
- Music by: Bert Rosé
- Release date: June 16, 1943
- Running time: 80 minutes
- Country: Argentina
- Language: Spanish

The Mirror (Spanish: El Espejo) is a 1943 Argentine drama film of the classical era of Argentine cinema directed by Francisco Múgica and starring Mirtha Legrand, Roberto Airaldi and Alicia Barrié.

== Cast ==
- Mirtha Legrand
- Roberto Airaldi
- Alicia Barrié
- Tito Gómez
- Ana Arneodo
- Rafael Frontaura
- María Santos
- Tilda Thamar
- Jorge Salcedo
