= Broadway Theatre (Buenos Aires) =

Art Deco theatre in Buenos Aires, Argentina

Coordinates: 34.6036°S 58.3831°W

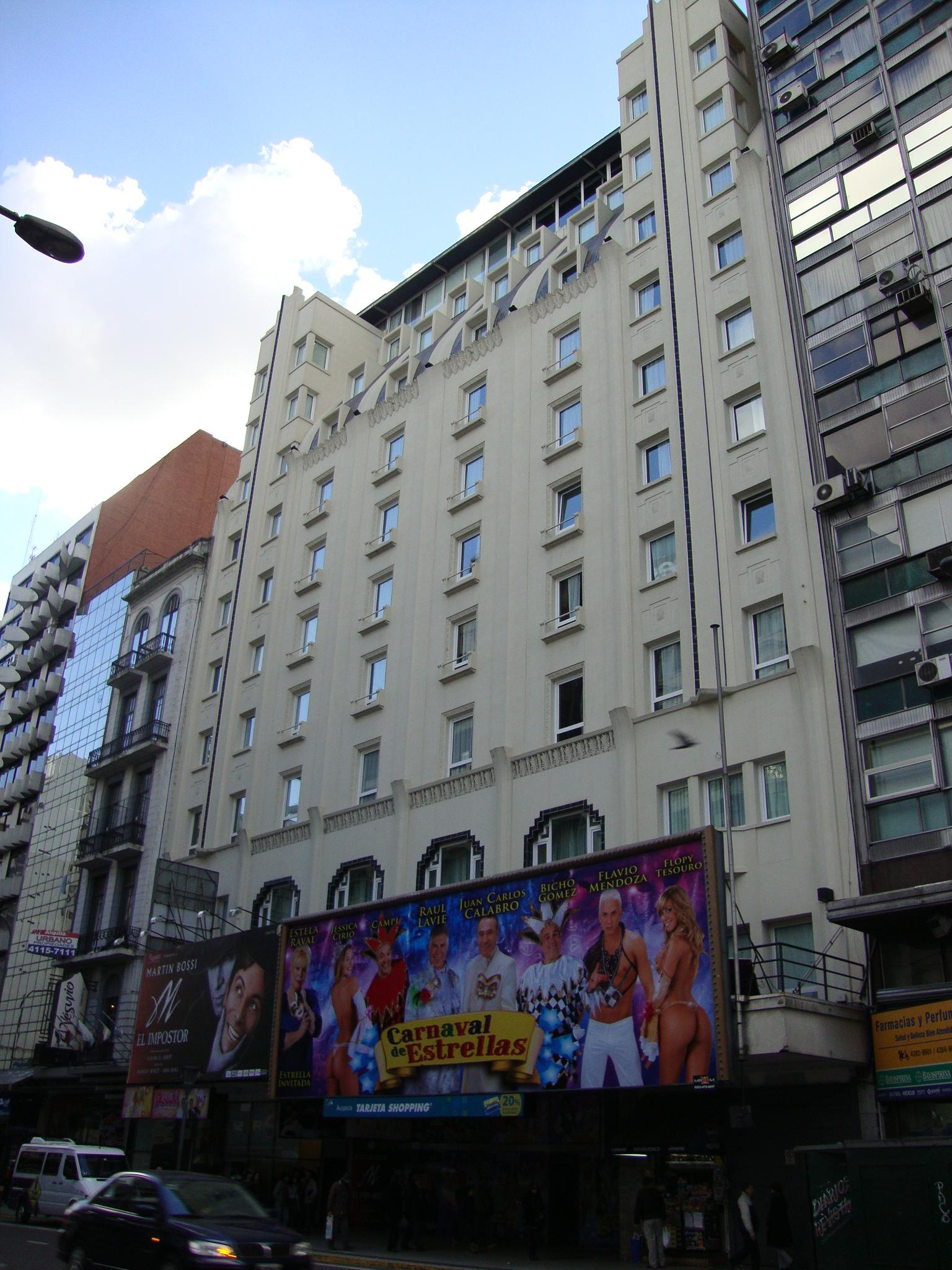
Broadway Theatre

The Teatro Broadway is an Art Deco style theatre in Buenos Aires, Argentina which opened on October 11, 1930.

Located near the centre of the city at 1155 Corrientes Avenue, it was designed by the architect Jorge Kálnay.

== History ==
The Broadway Theatre, built by the German company Wayss and Freytag, was inaugurated on October 11, 1930 by A. Alvarez & Co. during a film industry boom in Argentina. This was a period when older theaters needed to adapt to accommodate both theatrical plays and film screenings. The theater opened with the premiere of "The Underwater Tragedy" from 20th Century Fox.

Originally named the Broadway movie theater, it currently functions solely as a theater specializing in magazine-style works. Until 1939, under Alvarez's direction, the Broadway hosted premieres from major American studios including MGM (Metro Goldwyn Mayer), 20th Century Fox, Paramount, and Columbia (until 1935), as well as domestically produced films.

The original single room featured a paraboloid roof that provided excellent acoustics without echoes or reverberations, while also improving air circulation. The theater had an innovative 12-meter overhang above the audience, central air conditioning, and accommodated 2,265 people.

On October 19, 1931, Carlos Gardel performed at this theater. By 1942, the hall was dedicated exclusively to Argentine films. In 1954, the sound system was modernized, with the new Cinemascope system inaugurated with the film "The Sacred Mantle." Like many theaters of its era, the single room was eventually divided into two spaces. The building's top eight floors were originally designed as rental housing with a small confectionery. Vierendel beams with an 18-meter span supported the column-free theater roof.

In 1999, show business entrepreneur Alejandro Romay acquired the Broadway Theatre and undertook modernization efforts. The upper floors were converted into a hotel complex called "Broadway Hotel & Suites."

== Principal concerts ==
- Bring Me the Horizon
- Fish (singer)
- Erasure
- King Crimson
- Yes
- Soda Stereo
