= Francisco Múgica =

Argentine film director (1907–1985)

- Born: 10 April 1907; Buenos Aires, Argentina
- Died: 1985 (aged 77–78); Buenos Aires
- Occupation: Film maker

Francisco Múgica (10 April 1907 – 1985) was an Argentine film director, film editor and cinematographer notable for his work during the classical era of Argentine cinema. He was born and died in Buenos Aires.

Múgica initially began his career in film as a cinematographer in the mid-1930s but by 1939 he had become a film director directing his first film El Solterón early that year followed by the highly successful comedy Así es la vida. He directed some 25 films including the 1942 film Adolescencia. He retired from film in 1962.

== Filmography ==
As editor

- 1933 Los tres berretines (The Three Whims)
- 1934 Ayer y hoy
- 1935 Buenos Aires Nights
- 1935 El caballo del pueblo (The Favorite)
- 1936 La muchachada de a bordo
- 1936 Radio Bar
- 1937 El cañonero de Giles
- 1937 The Boys Didn't Wear Hair Gel Before
- 1938 Jettatore

As cinematographer

- 1935 El caballo del pueblo (The Favorite)
- 1936 Poncho blanco
- 1936 Radio Bar
- 1937 El cañonero de Giles
- 1937 Una porteña optimista
- 1937 The Boys Didn't Wear Hair Gel Before
- 1938 Three Argentines in Paris (exteriors)
- 1938 Jettatore

As director

- 1939 El solterón
- 1939 Margarita, Armando y su padre
- 1939 Así es la vida
- 1940 Medio millón por una mujer
- 1941 Honest Person Needed
- 1941 Los martes, orquídeas (On Tuesdays, Orchids)
- 1941 El mejor papá del mundo (The Best Father in the World)
- 1942 Adolescencia
- 1942 El pijama de Adán
- 1942 The Journey
- 1943 The Minister's Daughter
- 1943 I Win the War
- 1943 The Mirror
- 1944 Mi novia es un fantasma
- 1945 Back in the Seventies
- 1946 Cristina
- 1946 Deshojando margaritas
- 1946 Milagro de amor (1946 film)
- 1948 El barco sale a las diez
- 1949 Esperanza
- 1950 Piantadino
- 1951 La pícara cenicienta
- 1952 Rescate de sangre
- 1959 I Was Born in Buenos Aires
- 1962 Mi Buenos Aires querido
