= Francisco Lomuto =

Argentine musician (1893–1950)

- Born: Francisco Juan Lomuto; November 24, 1893; Buenos Aires, Argentina
- Died: December 23, 1950 (aged 57)
- Other names: Pancho Laguna
- Occupation: musician
- Years active: 1922–1950
- Known for: tango arrangements
- Notable work: La revoltosa, Fumando Espero, Muchachita del campo, Cachadora
- Parents: Victor Lomuto (father); Rosalia Narducci (mother)

Francisco Juan Lomuto (November 24, 1893 – December 23, 1950) was an Argentine Tango pianist, leader and composer who occasionally went by the pseudonym: "Pancho Laguna".

Lomuto was born in the Parque Patricios neighbourhood of Buenos Aires, one of 10 children raised by Victor Lomuto and Rosalia Narducci.

His mother, Rosalia, taught him piano, and by 1922, he had his own orchestra with whom he recorded over 950 numbers between 1922 and 1950.

Some of his best-known compositions are; La revoltosa, Fumando Espero, Muchachita del campo and Cachadora.

Characteristic of his tango arrangements is the ending with the diminished seventh (not in vals or milonga arrangements).

Lomuto became involved in several Argentine films such as El Alma de bandoneón La rubia del camino and Melgarejo.

In 1936, Lomuto was appointed as the president of organisation for the Sociedad Argentina de Autores y Compositores de Música (SADAIC) (Argentine Society of Music Authors and Composers).
