= El Fabricante de estrellas =

- Directed by: Manuel Romero
- Release date: 1943
- Running time: 79 minute
- Country: Argentina
- Language: Spanish

El Fabricante de estrellas is a 1943 Argentine film of the classical era of Argentine cinema directed by Manuel Romero.

== See also ==
- List of works by Manuel Romero
