= Luis Arata =

Argentine actor

- Born: 23 August 1895; Buenos Aires, Argentina
- Died: 21 June 1967 (aged 71); Buenos Aires, Argentina
- Occupation: Actor
- Years active: 1916-1958 (film)

Luis Arata (1895–1967) was an Argentine stage and film actor.

== Artistic career ==
Suggested by Roberto Casaux, in 1914 he began his career accompanying Enrique de Rosas at the Teatro Variedades. In 1916, he made his debut in silent film with Resaca, by Atilio Lippizi, in which Camila Quiroga participated and Arata intervened in its theatrical version. In 1921, he acted in Con pistola, a siete pasos!, by Julio F. Escobar. In 1923, he formed his own theatre company with Leopoldo Simari and José Franco, premiering Morriña, morriña mía, written by Enrique García Velloso.

== Selected filmography ==
- Outside the Law (1937)

== Bibliography ==
- Finkielman, Jorge. The Film Industry in Argentina: An Illustrated Cultural History. McFarland, 24 Dec 2003.
