= Canillita =

- Amanda Ledesma
- Directed by: Lisandro de la Tea and Manuel Roneima
- Written by: Lisandro de la Tea and Manuel Roneima
- Release date: 26 March 1936
- Country: Argentina

Canillita is a 1936 Argentine musical film directed and written by Lisandro de la Tea and Manuel Roneima and starring Amanda Ledesma (pictured). The film premiered on 26 March 1936 in Buenos Aires during the Golden Age of Argentine cinema.

== Cast ==
- Amanda Ledesma
- Adolfo Alsina
- Príncipe Azul
- Arizona Boys
- El Pibe Buenos Aires
- Héctor Calcaño
- Pedro Caldarella
- Gregorio Cicarelli
- Antonio Corrado
- Lopecito
- Pedro Maffia
- Sabina Olmos
- Roberto Paéz
- Benita Puértolas
- Manuel Roneima
- Gabino Seti
