= Samuel Eichelbaum =

Argentine writer

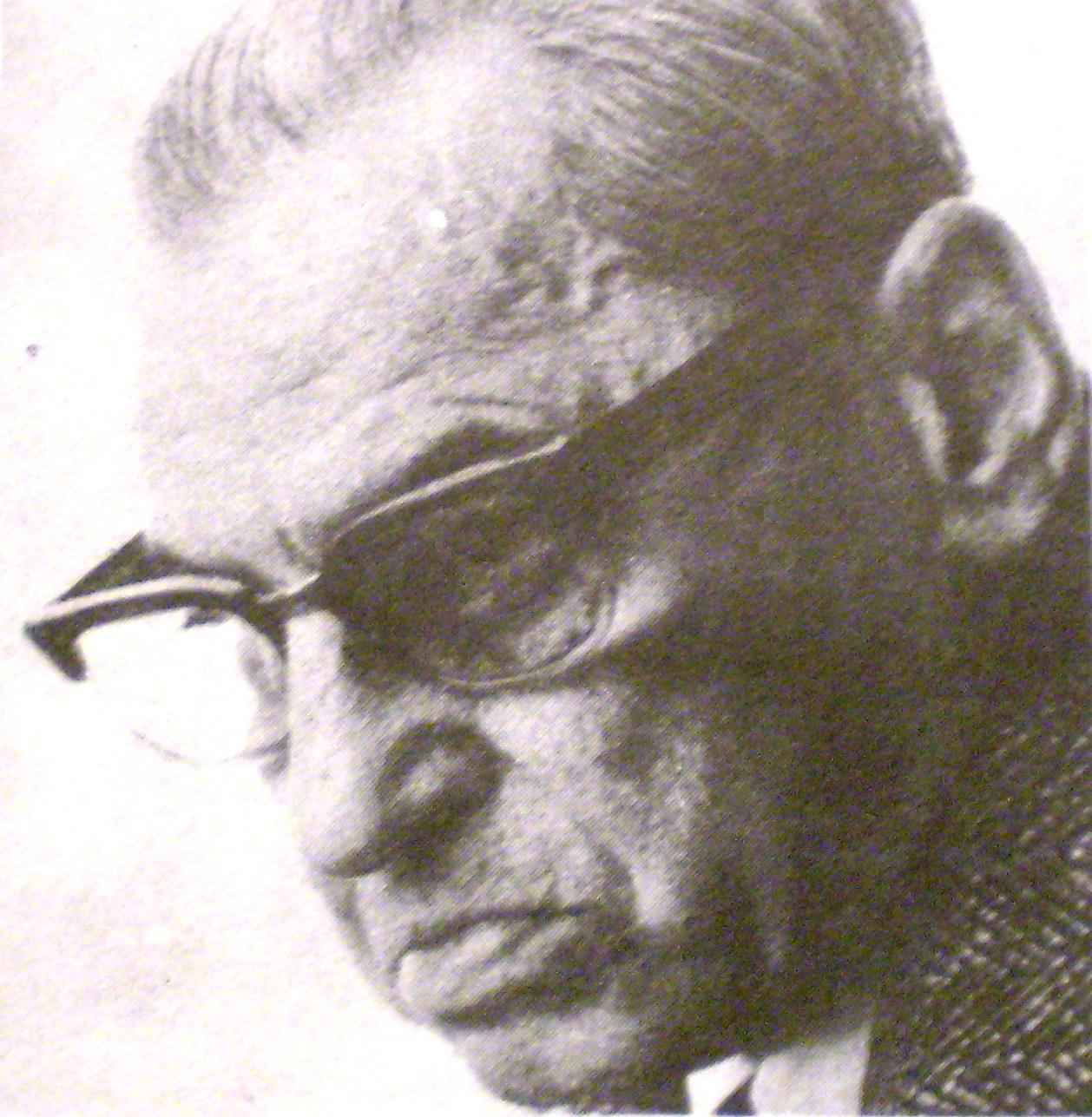
Samuel Eichelbaum

Samuel Eichelbaum (14 November 1894 - 4 May 1967) was an Argentine writer. He was born to Russian-Jewish immigrant parents in Villa Domínguez, Entre Ríos, Argentina. Eichelbaum became one of the leading playwrights in the first half of the 20th century in Argentina. He was also a translator.

== Works ==
- La mala sed (The Bad Thirst, 1920)
- El dogma (The Dogma, 1921)
- Un hogar (A Home, 1922)
- El judío Aarón (Aaron the Jew, 1926)
- Cuando tengas un hijo (When You Have a Child, 1929)
- Un guapo del 900 (The 1900s Dandy, 1940)
- Pajaro de barro (Bird of Clay, 1940)
- Divorcio nupcial (Nuptial Divorce, 1941)
- Rostro perdido (Lost Face, 1952)
- Dos brasas (Two Live Coals, 1952)
- Subsuelo (Underground, 1966)
