= La vuelta de Rocha =

- Directed by: Manuel Romero
- Starring: Ángel Magaña; Enrique Muiño; Elías Alippi
- Release date: 1937
- Running time: 81 minute
- Country: Argentina
- Language: Spanish

La vuelta de Rocha is a 1937 Argentine film directed and written by Manuel Romero during the Golden Age of Argentine cinema.

== Cast ==
- Ángel Magaña
- Enrique Muiño
- Elías Alippi
- Rosa Contreras
- Mercedes Simone

== See also ==
- List of works by Manuel Romero
