= Cine Monumental (Buenos Aires) =

Cinema in Buenos Aires, Argentina

Coordinates: 34.60245°S 58.377785°W

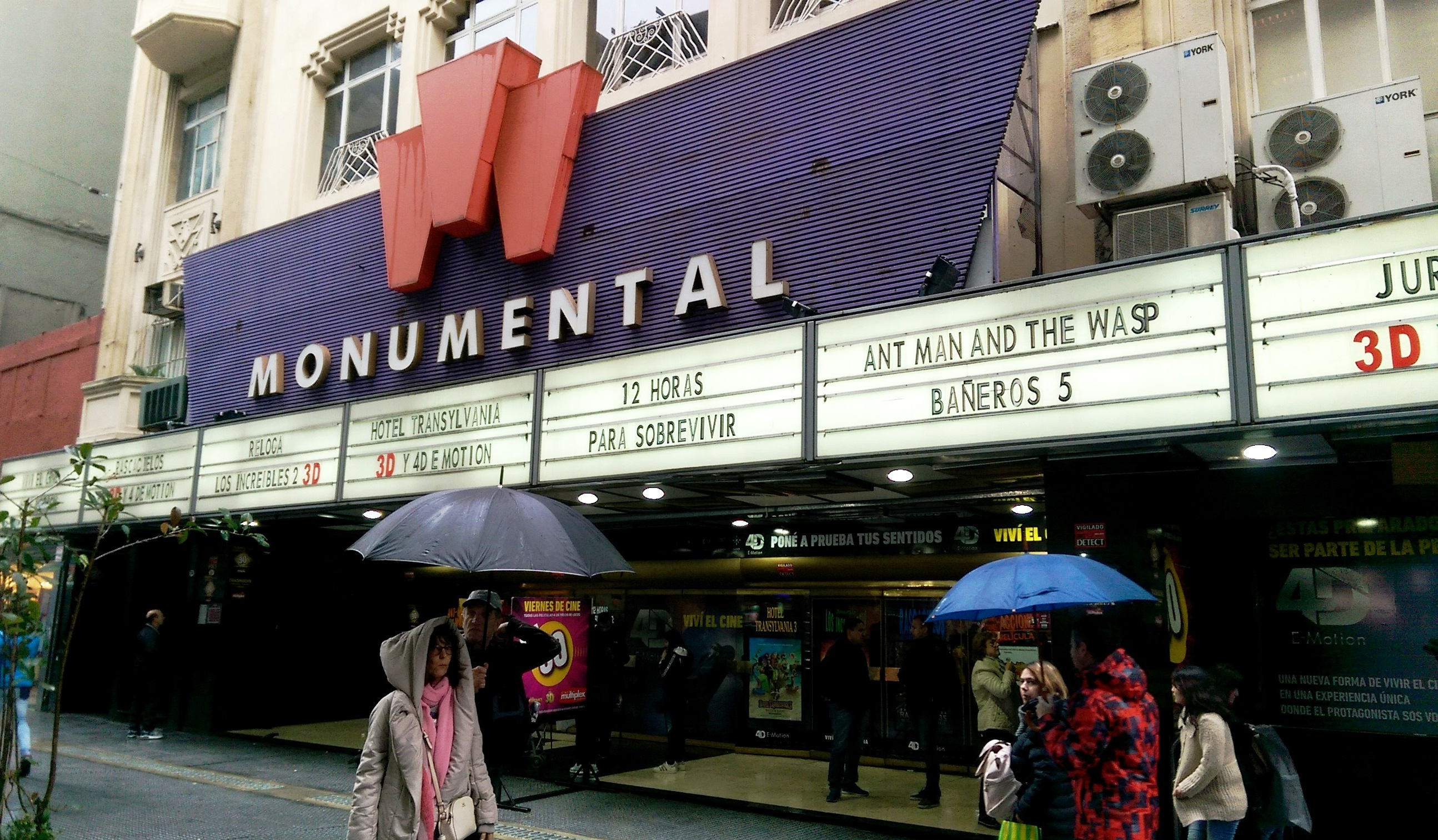
Cine Monumental (Buenos Aires)

Cine Monumental is a cinema at the junction of Calle Lavalle and Calle Esmerelda in Buenos Aires, Argentina. One of the classical cinemas of the country, built in the Art Deco style, it opened in 1931. With its grand auditorium seating 2,300, it acquired the nickname "The Cathedral of Cinema in Argentina". In the post-war years it was used mainly for stage shows, but in 1972 it was converted back to a cinema, with four screens. It closed in 1991, but was since refurbished and reopened ten years later. It is now operated by Cines Multiplex.
