= Fernando Ochoa =

Argentine actor

Fernando César Ochoa
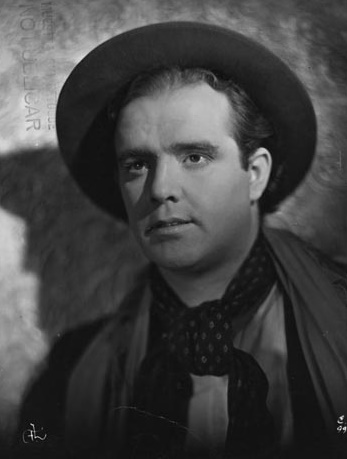
- Born: 29 November 1905; La Plata, Buenos Aires, Argentina
- Died: 23 March 1974 (aged 68); Capitán Sarmiento, Buenos Aires, Argentina
- Occupation: Actor

Fernando César Ochoa (also called Goyo Godoy; 29 November 1905 – 23 March 1974) was an actor from Argentina who appeared on radio, in films and on TV.

== Life ==
Fernando César Ochoa was born in La Plata, Buenos Aires, on 29 November 1905. His parents were María Luisa Escandón and Ernesto Gerónimo Ochoa. After leaving school he worked on an estancia, where he learned ranching skills. He then became an actor at "El Nacional" theatre. He played in the company of Eva Franco in works such as Joven, viuda y estanciera (Young, Widow and Rancher) and Cruza (Cross) He also interpreted works by Alberto Vaccarezza such as Allá va el resero Luna and Lo que le pasó a Reynoso.

Ochoa played the outlaw Juan Moreira both on the stage and in a film directed by Luis Moglia Barth. He also played in films such as Noches de Buenos Aires (Buenos Aires Nights), Así es el tango (This is Tango) and Cruza (Cross). For his looks and acting skills he became known as the "Argentine Valentino". In 1960 he appeared as Padre Brochero in the original version of El Cura Gaucho by Hugo MacDougall on the old Channel 7 TV station. He also performed on radio, especially as the long-running character "Don Bildigerno" an old small-town liar and comic. He performed this role in one of his films, Don Bildigerno de Pago Milagro (1948). Under the pseudonym "Goyo Godoy" Ochoa wrote various gaucho and popular lyrics.

Fernando César Ochoa died in a car accident on 23 March 1974 while driving to San Luis on Route 8, in the jurisdiction of Capitán Sarmiento.

== Appearances ==
=== Film ===
Ochoa appeared in the following films:

- 1935 Buenos Aires Nights
- 1936 Santos Vega
- 1937 Así es el tango (as Julián)
- 1940 Huella (Trail)
- 1942 Cruza
- 1948 Don Bildigerno de Pago Milagro
- 1948 Juan Moreira
- 1957 El Diablo de vacaciones

=== TV ===
Ochoa appeared in the following TV shows:

- 1951 Fernando Ochoa
- 1969 Domingos 69
- 1970 Domingo de fiesta
