= Manuel Romero (director) =

Argentine film director (1891–1954)

- Romero in 1940
- Born: 21 September 1891; Buenos Aires, Argentina
- Died: 3 October 1954 (aged 63); Buenos Aires, Argentina
- Resting place: Chacarita Cemetery
- Occupations: Film director; screenwriter; playwright; theatre director; tango lyricist; journalist
- Years active: 1913–1953
- Spouse: Ida Boyd (m. 1916)
- Children: 1

Manuel Romeo (September 21, 1891 – October 3, 1954 in Buenos Aires) was an Argentine film director, screenwriter, lyricist, and impresario of the revista porteña. One of the most influential and prolific directors of the Golden Age of Argentine cinema, he made over 50 films between 1931 and 1951.

He was a pioneer of local revue, and one of the few tango lyrical writers that has reached timeless classical success. When he was a teenager, he began his journalist job in the Magacine Fray Mochoy, and in the newspapers Crítica y Última Hora.

His first play, "Teatro breve" is from 1919 with the collaboration of Ivo Pelay. He wrote 180 more. In 1922 the most famous, "El bailarín del cabaret", was staged with the César Ratti's company, where Corsini triunfó (had a success) with "Patotero sentimental".

In 1923 he travelled to Europe with Luis Bayón Herrera. In Paris, where he acted on several plays, he met Carlos Gardel and the idea of filmmaking was born. He wrote the plot and songs for "Luces de Buenos Aires", directed by Adelqui Millar. It starred Gloria Guzmán, Sofía Bozán, Pedro Quartucci and the Julio De Caro musical group.

He returned to Buenos Aires, where he introduced the new ideas taken from music hall and varieties shows. He started to work at the Lumitón cinema company, with Enrique Telémaco Susini. With that film company, released in February 1935, "Noches de Buenos Aires", written and directed by Romero, his cinema career began. The film starred Tita Merello, Irma Córdoba, Enrique Serrano and Fernando Ochoa.

He filmed very quickly, he only wanted to have it finished as soon as possible and achieve a good box office outcome. His films were rejected by critics and intellectuals as a result, but ordinary people liked his style because they knew him from radio of variety shows.

He directed films such as Adiós pampa mía in 1946. His final film 'Ue... paisano!' in 1953 featured vocal performances by the "Italian Troubadour" Nicola Paone.

== Filmography ==
The complete list of Romero's works includes his films in addition to his work in theater and songwriting.
