= List of Argentine films of the 1930s =

Film production in the Cinema of Argentina increased strongly in the mid- to late 1930s.

The incorporation of sound had a great impact. In 1930 Adiós Argentina became the first Argentine film to have a soundtrack. The film spawned star actresses such as Libertad Lamarque and Ada Cornaro who both debuted in the film.

In 1931 José A. Ferreyra directed Muñequitas porteñas, and was the first Argentine spoken film, with Vitaphone synchronisation. That year El cantar de mi ciudad was directed by José A. Ferreyra as early directors made the transition to sound.

Around 1933 the Movietone arrived and it allowed both voice and music in motion pictures. Also, the first two Argentine cinematographic studios were created: Argentina Sono Film was founded by Ángel Mentasti, and Lumiton was created by Enrique Telémaco Susini, César José Guerrico and Luis Romero Carranza.

The first disc-less sound film was Tango (1931), directed by Luis Moglia Barth. A key film of the period was the tango film Dancing (1933 film) which saw the birth of a number of Argentine stars such as Amelia Bence and Tito Lusiardo. Other actors such as Tita Merello, Floren Delbene, Aída Alberti and Armando Bo began to gain popularity.

Successful films were: El alma del bandoneón, Mario Soffici, 1935; La muchachada de a bordo, Manuel Romero, 1936; Ayúdame a vivir, 1936; Besos brujos (1937) and La vuelta al nido (Leopoldo Torres Ríos, 1938 and Así es la vida (1939) directed by Francisco Mugica.

Manuel Romero in particular was one of the most prominent directors of the mid to late 1930s and consistently worked in comedy based films often with rising Argentine star Luis Sandrini in films such as Don Quijote del altillo.

Films produced in Argentina in the 1930s ordered by year of release on separate pages:

== 1930 ==
- List of Argentine films of 1930

== 1931 ==
- List of Argentine films of 1931

== 1932 ==
- List of Argentine films of 1932

== 1933 ==
- List of Argentine films of 1933

== 1934 ==
- List of Argentine films of 1934

== 1935 ==
- List of Argentine films of 1935

== 1936 ==
- List of Argentine films of 1936

== 1937 ==
- List of Argentine films of 1937

== 1938 ==
- List of Argentine films of 1938

== 1939 ==
- List of Argentine films of 1939
