= List of Argentine films of 1940 =

A list of films produced in Argentina in 1940.

Argentine films of 1940
Title	Director	Release	Genre
A - C
Amor	Luis Bayón Herrera	23 October	Comedy
El ángel de trapo	José A. Ferreyra	25 April	Drama
Azahares rojos	Edmo Cominetti	11 December	Drama
Canto de amor	Julio Irigoyen	unreleased	Musical
El Cantor de Buenos Aires	Julio Irigoyen	16 May	Musical
El cantor del circo	Nelo Cosimi	inédito	Musical
Caprichosa y millonaria	Enrique Santos Discépolo	1° of May	Comedy
La carga de los valientes	Adelqui Millar	12 June	Drama
Carnaval de antaño	Manuel Romero	17 April	Musical
La casa del recuerdo	Luis Saslavsky	20 March	Drama
Casamiento en Buenos Aires	Manuel Romero	1° of January	Comedy
Los celos de Cándida	Luis Bayón Herrera	5 June	Comedy
Chingolo	Lucas Demare	18 September	Comedy
Cita en la frontera	Mario Soffici	25 September	Drama
Con el dedo en el gatillo	Luis José Moglia Barth	19 June	Policial
Confesión	Luis José Moglia Barth	23 October	Comedy
Corazón de turco	Lucas Demare	9 May	Comedy
D - G
Dama de compañía	Alberto de Zavalía	8 May	Comedy
De México llegó el amor	Richard Harlan	16 July	Musical
¿Dónde está tu mujer?	Gastón Mayol	21 September	Comedy
Educating Niní	Luis Cesar Amadori	17 July	Comedy
Encadenado	Enrique de Rosas	28 March	Drama
Explosivo 008	James Bauer	19 September	Drama
Flecha de oro	Carlos Borcosque	28 August	comedy
Fragata Sarmiento	Carlos Borcosque	22 May	History
Galleguita	Julio Irigoyen	28 June	Drama
H - L
Ha entrado un ladrón	Augusto César Vatteone	3 April	Comedy
El Haragán de la familia	Luis Cesar Amadori	21 February	Comedy
Héroes sin fama	Mario Soffici	10 April	Drama
El hijo del barrio	Lucas Demare	29 February	Drama
Huella	Luis José Moglia Barth	24 January	Drama
El inglés de los güesos	Carlos Hugo Christensen	4 September	Drama
Isabelita	Manuel Romero	31 July	Comedy
Luna de miel en Río	Manuel Romero	9 October	Comedy
La luz de un fósforo	Leopoldo Torres Ríos	15 May	Comedy
M - Z
Medio millón por una mujer	Francisco Mugica	6 March	Comedy
Mi fortuna por un nieto	Luis Bayón Herrera	14 August	Comedy
Los muchachos se divierten	Manuel Romero	3 July	Comedy
Nosotros…los muchachos	Carlos Borcosque	27 November	Drama
Los ojazos de mi negra	Eduardo G. Ursini	16 October	Romance, Drama
Pájaros sin nido	José A. Ferreyra	13 November	Drama
Petróleo	Arturo S. Mom	18 December	Drama
Pueblo chico, infierno grande	Orestes Caviglia	12 June	Drama
Sinvergüenza	Leopoldo Torres Ríos	30 October	Comedy
El solterón	Francisco Mugica	29 May	Comedy
Su nombre es mujer	Julio Irigoyen	29 March	Drama
El susto que Pérez se llevó	Richard Harlan	4 December	Comedy
The Tango Star	Luis Bayón Herrera	7 February	Musical
Un bebé de contrabando	Eduardo Morera	14 August	Comedy
Un señor mucamo	Enrique Santos Discépolo	11 September	Comedy
Yo hablo...	Enrique Gándara	20 June	Drama

== See also ==
- Lists of Argentine films
