= List of Argentine films of 1939 =

A list of films produced in Argentina in 1939:

Argentine films of 1939
Title	Director	Release	Genre
A - C
24 horas en libertad	Lucas Demare	21 June	Comedy
Alas de mi patria	Carlos Borcosque	5 April	semiDocumentary
Ambición	Adelqui Millar	29 June	Drama
Así es la vida	Francisco Mugica	19 July	Drama
Atorrante (La venganza de la tierra)	Enrique de Rosas	13 July	Drama
Bartolo tenía una flauta	Antonio Botta	8 November	Comedy
Campeón por una mujer	Eugenio Gersbach	21 December	Comedy, Drama, Horror
Caminito de gloria	Luis César Amadori	20 September	Romantic Drama
La canción que tú cantabas	Miguel Mileo	7 July	Musical Comedy
Cándida	Luis Bayón Herrera	4 October	Comedy
Caras argentinas	Carmelo Santiago	18 May	Musical Comedy
Chimbela	José A. Ferreyra	30 August	Drama
La cieguita de la avenida Alvear	Julio Irigoyen	16 June	Drama
Cuatro corazones	Carlos Schlieper	1 March	Comedy
D - H
Divorcio en Montevideo	Manuel Romero	7 June	Comedy
Doce mujeres	Luis José Moglia Barth	8 March	Comedy
Frente a la vida	Enrique de Rosas	22 February	Drama
Gente bien	Manuel Romero	28 June	Musical, Drama
El gran camarada	Yago Blas	11 January	Comedy
Giácomo	Augusto César Vatteone	4 April	Drama
El grito de la juventud	Raúl Roulién	28 September	Drama
Hermanos	Enrique de Rosas	13 April	Drama
La hija del viejito guardafaro	Julio Irigoyen	1 June	Drama
I - M
La intrusa	Julio Saraceni	29 March	Drama
The Life of Carlos Gardel	Alberto de Zavalía	24 May	Musical Drama
El Loco Serenata	Luis Saslavsky	9 August	Comedy
Mandinga en la sierra	Isidoro Navarro	7 March	Comedy, Drama
Margarita, Armando y su padre	Francisco Mugica	19 April	Comedy
El matrero	Orestes Caviglia	12 July	Drama
El misterio de la dama de gris	Jamer Bauer	26 September	Short
Mi suegra es una fiera	Luis Bayón Herrera	23 February	Musical Comedy
La Modelo de la calle Florida	Julio Irigoyen	se desconoce	Musical
La modelo y la estrella	Manuel Romero	15 March	Comedy
Muchachas que estudian	Manuel Romero	6 September	Comedy
La mujer y el jockey	José Suárez	21 December	Policial
N - S
Nativa	Enrique de Rosas	7 September	Drama
Nuestra tierra de paz	Arturo S. Mom	4 July	History
Oro entre barro	Luis Bayón Herrera	25 April	Comedy
Los pagarés de Mendieta	Leopoldo Torres Ríos	18 October	Comedy
Palabra de honor	Luis César Amadori	10 May	Comedy
Prisioneros de la tierra	Mario Soffici	17 August	Drama
Puerta cerrada	Luis Saslavsky	1 February	Drama
Retazo	Elías Alippi	3 May	Comedy
El sobretodo de Céspedes	Leopoldo Torres Ríos	9 May	Comedy
Sombras de Buenos Aires	Julio Irigoyen	11 October	Drama
Sombras en el río	Juan Jacoby Renard	3 May	Drama
T - Z
Una mujer de la calle	Luis José Moglia Barth	23 August	Drama
La vida es un tango	Manuel Romero	8 February	Musical
El viejo doctor	Mario Soffici	18 May	Drama
Y los sueños pasan	Enrique de Rosas	19 May	Drama, Romance
...Y mañana serán hombres	Carlos Borcosque	25 October	Drama
