= List of Argentine films of 1945 =

A list of films produced in Argentina in 1945:

Argentine films of 1945
Title	Director	Release	Genre
A - E
La amada inmóvil	Luis Bayón Herrera	27 July	
Back in the Seventies	Francisco Múgica	24 May	Historical drama
El canto del cisne	Carlos Hugo Christensen	27 April	
Chiruca	Benito Perojo	4 July	
The Circus Cavalcade	Mario Soffici and Eduardo Boneo	30 May	
Cuando en el cielo pasen lista	Carlos F. Borcosque	29 November	Drama
Éramos seis	Carlos F. Borcosque	30 August	
F - Z
Llegó la niña Ramona	Catrano Catrani	27 September	
Lost Kisses	Mario Soffici	30 August	
Madame Sans-Gêne	Luis César Amadori	15 March	
María Celeste	Julio Saraceni	5 April	
Pampa bárbara	Lucas Demare and Hugo Fregonese	9 October	
The Phantom Lady	Luis Saslavsky	17 May	Historical comedy
Rigoberto	Luis Mottura	19 April	
Santa Cándida	Luis César Amadori	10 May	
Se abre el abismo	Pierre Chenal	16 March	
Las seis suegras de Barba Azul	Carlos Hugo Christensen	10 August	
La señora de Pérez se divorcia	Carlos Hugo Christensen	19 July	
The Song of Buenos Aires	Julio Irigoyen		Musical
The Soul of a Tango	Julio Irigoyen	20 April	Musical
Two Angels and a Sinner	Luis César Amadori	4 July	Comedy drama
Villa Rica del Espíritu Santo	Benito Perojo	2 August	
Wake Up to Life	Mario Soffici	11 April	Drama
A Woman of No Importance	Luis Bayón Herrera	1 March	Drama

== External links and references ==
- Argentine films of 1945 at the Internet Movie Database
