= List of Argentine films of 1941 =

A list of films produced in Argentina in 1941.

Argentine films of 1941
Title	Director	Release	Genre
A - C
Los afincaos	Leónidas Barletta	28 October	Drama
Águila Blanca	Carlos Hugo Christensen	16 April	Drama
Al toque de clarín	Orestes Caviglia	16 July	
Boina blanca	Luis José Moglia Barth	29 October	
By the Light of a Star	Enrique Santos Discépolo	7 May	
Canción de cuna	Gregorio Martínez Sierra	3 September	
Cándida millonaria	Luis Bayón Herrera	17 September	
El Cantar de mis penas	Julio Irigoyen		
La casa de los cuervos	Carlos Borcosque	29 April	
Conozcamos a nuestra patria		October	Documentary
El cura gaucho	Lucas Demare	25 June	
D - H
El más infeliz del pueblo	Luis Bayón Herrera	19 March	
Embrujo	Enrique Telémaco Susini	18 June	
Entre pitos y flautas	Quirino Cristiani		Animated short film
Fortín Alto	Luis José Moglia Barth	3 June	
Fronteras de la ley	Isidoro Navarro	4 April	
Hay que casar a Ernesto	Orestes Caviglia	20 August	
El hermano José	Antonio Momplet	27 August	
Historia de una noche	Luis Saslavsky	9 April	
Hogar, dulce hogar	Luis José Moglia Barth	15 January	
La Hora de las sorpresas	Daniel Tinayre	21 October	
I - N
Joven, viuda y estanciero	Luis Bayón Herrera	11 June	
Mamá Gloria	Richard Harlan	20 August	
Los martes, orquídeas	Francisco Mugica	4 June	romantic comedy
El mejor papá del mundo	Francisco Mugica	14 March	
Melodies of America	Eduardo Morera		Musical comedy
Mi amor eres tú	Manuel Romero	10 September	
El mozo número 13	Leopoldo Torres Ríos	26 February	
La mujer del zapatero	Julio Irigoyen	9 April	
La mujer y la selva	José A. Ferreyra	3 December	
Napoleón	Luis César Amadori	5 February	
Novios para las muchachas	Antonio Momplet	29 January	
O - T
Orquesta de señoritas	Luis César Amadori	21 May	comedy
Papá tiene novia	Carlos Schlieper	22 October	
Peluquería de señoras	Luis Bayón Herrera	12 November	
Persona honrada se necesita	Francisco Mugica	13 August	
La quinta calumnia	Adelqui Millar	22 January	
Si yo fuera rica	Carlos Schlieper	16 April	comedy
Soñar no cuesta nada	Luis César Amadori	1 October	
The Song of the Suburbs	Luis César Amadori	5 March	
El tesoro de la isla Maciel	Manuel Romero	8 July	
Tierra adentro	Tino Dalbi	25 April	
U - Z
Último refugio	John Reinhardt	20 August	
Una vez en la vida	Carlos Borcosque	30 July	
Un bebé de París	Manuel Romero	18 March	
Un hombre bueno	Carlos Torres Ríos	26 November	
Un pobre rico	Julio Irigoyen	unreleased	
La "V" enfrenta a la Blitzkrieg		December	montage documentary
Veinte años y una noche	Alberto de Zavalía	1 July	
Volver a vivir	Adelqui Millar	23 April	
When the Heart Sings	Richard Harlan	6 August	
Yo quiero morir contigo	Mario Soffici	2 July	
Yo quiero ser bataclana	Manuel Romero	30 April	comedy
