= Alfredo Arrocha =

Argentinian actor and singer

- Born: 2 September 1910; San Martín, Buenos Aires, Argentina
- Died: 5 February 1965 (aged 54); Buenos Aires, Argentina
- Occupation(s): Actor, singer
- Years active: 1930–1965
- Spouse: Lucha Sosa

Alfredo Arrocha (2 September 1910 – 5 February 1965) was an Argentine actor and tango singer.

== Career ==
He was one of the actors who gained popularity in radio theater ensembles during the 1930s and 1940s. As a soloist, he sang tango.

Arrocha was a popular singer during the golden age of tango and Argentine cinema. In his early days, he was a vocalist for Héctor Stamponi, performing several of his compositions. Among the tangos he performed were Seguí mi consejo and Garufa.

He made his film debut as a leading man in the 1942 movie Gran pensión La Alegría, alongside Warly Ceriani, Josefina Dessein, Osvaldo Moreno, Chola Luna, and Herminia Velich. This was followed by Su íntimo secreto (1948), with Mercedes Carné, Felipe Dudán, and Elvita Solán. He made his final film appearance in Compañeros de aventuras (1948), starring Pablo Lagarde, Adolfo Stray, Vera Láinez, and Joaquín Petrosino.

His theater career was more extensive. In 1937, he joined "La Compañía Lírica de Sainetes de Costumbres Porteñas" ("The Lyric Company of Buenos Aires Customs Sainetes"), directed by Juan de Dios Filiberto.

Between 1947 and 1948, he shared the stage of the Apolo Theater with the singer Chola Bosch, alongside Gregorio Cicarelli, Leonor Rinaldi, Tito Lusiardo, Delia Codebó, and Juan Dardés. Arrocha, together with Eusebio Giorno, composed all the musical pieces for two plays: En el tiempo que había guapos and Entre locos y milongas.

And in the 1950s, he led his own theater company at the Teatro Variedades with the play Un guapo del arrabal. Novela escénica en tres actos, in collaboration with Roberto Valenti. In 1959, he was part of the Argentine Comedy Company led by Pablo Palitos.

In 1952, he presented several radio dramas such as Estampas Porteñas, La calle del olvido, and La sangre de los jazmines. Many of his radio appearances were on Belgrano and L.S.6 Radio del Pueblo.

== Private life ==
He was married to the acclaimed circus, theater, and television actress Lucha Sosa, whom he met and married at Radio Belgrano during the popular program Estampas Porteñas, in which they both worked alongside a prominent cast that included Enrique Roldán, Pedro Fiorito, Eduardo París, Mary Lewis, Olga Montes, Albo Argentino Uriarte, and Marta Peña.

== Death ==
The singer and film and theater actor Alfredo Arrocha died on Friday, February 5, 1965, at the age of 54. His remains rest in the Pantheon of the Argentine Association of Actors at La Chacarita Cemetery.

== Performed tangos ==
- Seguí mi consejo
- El huérfano
- Garufa
- A media luz

== Films ==
- Compañeros de aventuras (1948)
- Su íntimo secreto (1948)
- Gran pensión La Alegría (1942)

== Theatre ==
- Hormiga negra
- Se acabó lo que se daba (1937)
- Adiós, le dije al amor (1937)
- En el tiempo que había guapos (1947)
- Entre locos y milongas (1948)
- Un guapo del arrabal (1951)
- Cayó un alemán del cielo (1959), de Miguel Coronato Paz. Interpretado por Pablo Palitos, Manolita Serra y Pepe Armil.
- Esta noche soy un yanqui (1959), de Abel Santa Cruz, estrenada en el Teatro Smart con Pablo Palitos, Fanny Brena, Alejandro Maximino, Noemí Laserre y Antonio Provitilo.
