= Mi Buenos Aires querido =

Mi Buenos Aires querido may refer to:

- "Mi Buenos Aires querido" (song), a 1934 tango song by Gardel
- Mi Buenos Aires querido (1936 film), an Argentine musical film
- Mi Buenos Aires querido (1961 film), an Argentine film
