= List of Argentine films of 1935 =

A list of films produced in Argentina in 1935:

Argentine films of 1935
Title	Director	Release	Genre
A - Z
El alma del bandoneón	Mario Soffici	20 February	Musical; Comedy
Bajo la santa Federación	Daniel Tinayre	21 March	Drama; Historic
La barra mendocina	Mario Soffici	2 August	Comedy
El caballo del pueblo	Manuel Romero	15 August	Musical; Comedy
Crimen a las tres	Luis Saslavsky	22 August	Drama
Escala en la ciudad	Alberto de Zavalía	30 October	Drama
El Fogón de los gauchos	Julio Irigoyen		Musical
Internado	Héctor Basso and Carlos de la Púa	25 September	Comedy
Los misterios de Buenos Aires	Julio Irigoyen		Drama; Musical
Monte Criollo	Arturo S. Mom	22 May	Musical
Noites Cariocas	Enrique Cadícamo	3 December	Comedy
Noches de Buenos Aires	Manuel Romero	27 March	Musical
Pibelandia	Augusto César Vatteone	20 September	Drama
Picaflor	Luis José Moglia Barth	17 July	Drama
Por buen camino	Eduardo Morera	31 October	Comedy
Puente Alsina	José A. Ferreyra	6 August	Drama
Tango Bar	John Reinhardt		Musical
La Virgencita de Pompeya	Enrique Cadícamo	14 March	Musical
