= Rafael Frontaura =

Chilean actor (1896–1966)

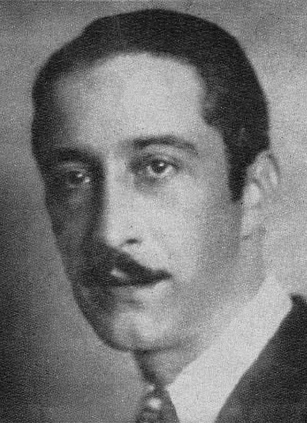
Rafael Frontaura

Rafael Frontaura (7 February 1896 in Valparaíso – 15 August 1966 in Santiago) was a Chilean actor and writer who worked in both Chilean and Argentine cinema. He appeared in El hombre de acero (1917), Little Teacher of Workmen (1941) and Rigoberto (1945), and he also starred in the acclaimed Silver Condor-winning 1943 film Juvenilia.

He was born to José Manuel Frontaura Arana and Filomena de la Fuente Dueñas. He was married to María Cristina Yañez Gumucio until his death.

== Filmography ==
- El hombre de acero (also wrote)
- Los payasos se van (1921)
- Our Land of Peace (1939)
- Ambición (1939)
- La quinta calumnia (1941)
- Napoleón (1941)
- Volver a vivir (1941)
- Historia de una noche (1941)
- Sensational Kidnapping (1942) – Carlos Suárez
- La maestrita de los obreros (1942)
- Yo conocí a esa mujer (1942)
- Concierto de almas (1942)
- En el viejo Buenos Aires (1942)
- El espejo (1943)
- Casi un sueño (1943)
- Juvenilia (1943)
- La juventud manda (1943)
- Stella (1943)
- Cuando florezca el naranjo (1943)
- Hay que casar a Paulina (1944)
- Apasionadamente (1944)
- Camino del infierno (1945) – Carlos
- Rigoberto (1945)
- Rosa de América (1946)
- Rodríguez supernumerario (1948)
- La gran tentación (1948)
- Ángeles de uniforme (Inédita) (1949)
- Fascinación (1949)
- Toscanito y los detectives (1950) – Linares
- Cuando un pobre se divierte (1951)
- El extraño caso del hombre y la bestia (1951) – Actor
- Reportaje en el infierno (1951)
- My Divine Poverty (1951)
