= A Good Man (1941 film) =

- Release date: 1941
- Country: Argentina
- Language: Spanish

A Good Man (Spanish Un Hombre bueno) is a 1941 Argentine film directed by Carlos Torres Ríos during the Golden Age of Argentine cinema.

== Cast ==
- Julio Bianquet
- Cayetano Biondo
- Emperatriz Carvajal
- José Castro
- Max Citelli
- Severo Fernández
- Claudio Martino
- Judith Sulian
- Luis Cuda
- Francisco Mileo
- José Plastino
- Warly Ceriani
- Pablo Cumo
