= Nelly Omar =

Argentine actress and singer

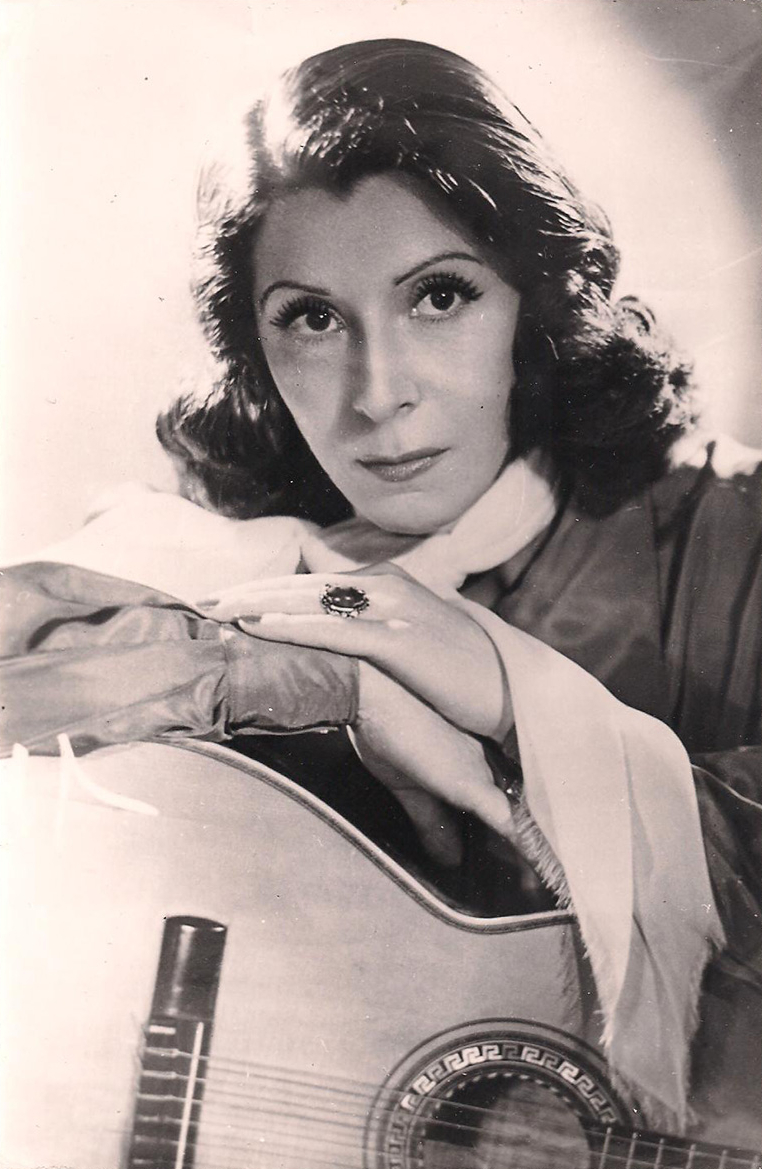
- Born: Nilda Elvira Vattuone Pesoa; 10 September 1911; Bonifacio, Guaminí, Argentina
- Died: 20 December 2013 (aged 102); Buenos Aires, Argentina
- Occupations: Actress, singer
- Years active: 1924–2011
- Spouse: Antonio Molina (1935–1943)

Nilda Elvira Vattuone (10 September 1911 – 20 December 2013), better known by her stage name Nelly Omar, was an Argentine actress and singer during the Golden Age of Argentine Cinema. She was successful as a tango singer, performing on numerous radio shows and performed canción criolla. Her film career began in 1940. She was blacklisted after the ouster of Juan Perón for having sung his anthem, Soy La Descamisada and did not work again until the 1970s. From her comeback in 1972, she remained an active performer until her death.

== Biography ==
Nilda Elvira Vattuone Pesoa was born in Bonifacio a small town in the Guaminí subdivision of, Buenos Aires on 10 September 1911 to Marcos Vattuone and Salustiana Pesoa. Her father died while she was quite young and the family moved to Buenos Aires, for better work prospects. Nelly began working in a textile factory at age 12. From the age of 13, she dreamed of becoming a pilot and went to flight school. It was there that she met Eva Duarte, who also had aspirations of becoming an aviator.

In 1924, Omar began singing tango professionally. Ignacio Corsini gave her her big break into singing when he heard her and hired her for his radio shows. She sang with the ensemble Cenizas del fogón under the direction of José Luis Suilas. Between 1932 and 1933, Radio Stentor broadcast duets of Omar and her sister. When she was hired by Radio Belgrano she worked with some of the most famous tango poets, Enrique Cadícamo and Homero Manzi, as well as some of the most famous singers then working, Libertad Lamarque and Agustín Magaldi. Homero Manzi wrote at least three tangos for Omar: Solamente ella, Ninguna and Sur. She had a clear voice with firm phrasing and reached the height of her fame in the 1940s and 1950s. Trademark tangos, which remain associated with her are Amar y callar, Del tiempo de la morocha, Manoblanca, Nobleza de arrabal and Tu vuelta Sur. She also performed in the canción criolla genre, which had been all but forgotten.

In 1946, Omar recorded her first album, accompanied by Francisco Canaro’s orchestra, on the Odeón label. In 1951 she was signed by RCA Victor, and recorded a 78 rpm album with Domingo Farafiotti’s orchestra. In 1955, she traveled to Montevideo, Uruguay and appeared in a stage production and then moved to Venezuela for a year, before returning to Argentina. She retired from singing upon her return until her comeback in 1972.

In 1945, Omar sang an anthem, a milonga, Soy La Descamisada, which was created for the political campaign of Juan Perón. She wholeheartedly supported Perón and when he was ousted in 1955, she was blacklisted from the entertainment industry for 17 years. She made only three films prior to 1955, including Canto de amor (1940), directed by Julio Irigoyen, which also starred the singer Carlos Viván. It is believed that all copies of the film were destroyed; however, the Argentine film archives has photographs taken during filming.

In 1942, she filmed Melodías de América with Eduardo Morera. Though she is not listed in the cast roster, she is documented in a cast photo of the film. In 1951, she dubbed the singing voice of Mecha Ortiz in the film Mi vida por la tuya. She would not make another film for 57 years, but in 2008, she worked on a documentary about tango entitled Café de los maestros under the direction of Miguel Kohan.

In 1972, she staged a singing comeback accompanied by guitarist José Canet, who convinced her to come out of retirement. They did a series of concerts and she began releasing records, appearing regularly on stage, and she also wrote two books.

She died of cardiac arrest on 20 December 2013, aged 102, at the Hospital Universitario CEMIC in her native Buenos Aires.

== Honours ==
In 1986, she was declared Honorary Citizen of the City of Buenos Aires and received the award for Great Performer from the Society of Authors and Composers (SADAIC).

== Selected works ==
- Omar, Nelly; Francisco Canaro. Adiós, pampa mía tango campero de la comedia musical 'el tango en París'; Canción desesperada Gramófono-Odeón: Barcelona (194?) 78 RPM (in Spanish)
- Omar, Nelly. Farol de los gauchos EMI Odeon SAIC: Argentina (1950) (re-released 1995 Music CD) (in Spanish)
- Omar, Nelly. Nelly Omar - El dia que me quieras Magenta Discos: Buenos Aires (1987) Music CD (in Spanish)
- Omar, Nelly. Nelly Omar, Fiorentino El Bandoneon: Barcelona (1989) Music CD (in Spanish)
- Omar, Nelly. Desde el alma Disgal: Buenos Aires (1994) Book (in Spanish)
- Omar, Nelly; Nacha Roldán. Tu vuelta: Sentir el folklore colección Altaya: Barcelona (2000) Music CD (in Spanish)
- Omar, Nelly. La Gardela Sony/BMG Music: Buenos Aires (2005) Music CD (in Spanish)
- Omar, Nelly. Nelly Omar Clarinx: Buenos Aires (2005), Tango collection and autobiography (in Spanish)
- Omar, Nelly. Los Grandes Cantores - Nelly Omar RHI Records: Buenos Aires (2009) Music CD (in Spanish)

== Documentary ==
In 2012 Teresa Saporiti, Nelly's great-niece, started work on the documentary Nelly Omar Cantora Nacional (Nelly Omar National Singer). Nelly appears in the movie relaxed, with good memory and plans for future projects. The film was completed in 2014, but music licensing issues delayed distribution until 2015.

== Filmography ==
- Canto de amor (1940)
- Melodies of America (1942)
- Mi vida por la tuya (1951) dubbed vocals
- Café de los maestros (2008)

== See also ==
- List of centenarians (actors, filmmakers and entertainers)
