= Titanes en el ring =

Argentine television series

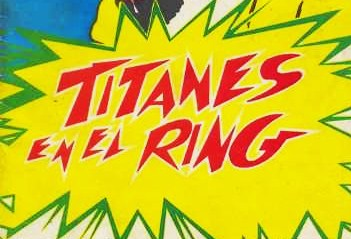
- Logo of Titanes en el ring

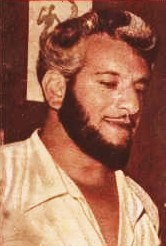
- Martín Karadagián, the creator of Titanes
- Industry: Professional wrestling Sports entertainment
- Genre: Lucha libre
- Founded: 1962
- Founder: Martín Karadagián
- Defunct: 2001
- Headquarters: Buenos Aires
- Area served: Argentina; South America
- Products: Television; Publishing; Films; Music; Merchandise; Live events
- Services: Licensing

Titanes en el ring (Titans in the ring) was an Argentine professional wrestling promotion and television series. Titanes en el ring also refers to the promotion's television program aired between 3 March 1962 and 1988.

== Background ==
The Armenian Argentine Martín Karadagián (1922-1991) had started at 15 years old practicing Greco-Roman wrestling in the Asociación Cristiana de Jóvenes. The following year he joined a troupe of wrestlers, with which he traveled to Europe. After returning to Argentina in 1947, Karadagián maintained a fight at Luna Park against Ivan Zelezniak, El Hombre Montaña. After to give up the fight Zelezniak (five-time champion from 1947 to 1951), the Armenian was already one of the most attractive conveners of the wrestling in Buenos Aires.

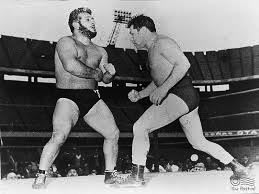
Karadagián vs Gatica

In 1950s Karadagián fought against former heavyweight champion Primo Carnera. And in 1957 he maintained a wrestling match in the stadium of Boca Juniors, against former boxer José María Gatica, el mono. That same year, Karadagian starred in Reencuentro con la gloria, movie where a wrestler ("Pantera") accidentally killed a rival during a fight.

In 1961 Karadagián fought at Luna Park against Capitan Piluso, played by actor Alberto Olmedo. Following the success of combat was filmed the movie Las aventuras del Capitán Piluso (En el castillo del terror) with Martín Karadagián in the role of villain.

== Titanes en el Ring ==
Martín Karadagián creates Titans in the ring in 1962, the TV show airs on Canal 9 in live from Luna Park. Karadagian had hired great figures of wrestling as El Hombre Montaña, Eduardo "Alí" Bargach (bodybuilder), Alberto Eijo, Pedro Goitía, Dakar, Ararat, el Indio Comanche, Mister Chile, and Hans Águila as referee. Karadagian himself appeared regularly in the show, in which he was regarded as the "World Champion".

In 1964 José Luis López (el campeón español) joined in Titans, time after, Karadagiám hired the wrestlers Rubén Peucelle el Ancho, Pedro Bocos, Ulises, Humberto Reynoso El Caballero Rojo and Domingo Lucciarini Pepino el Payaso.

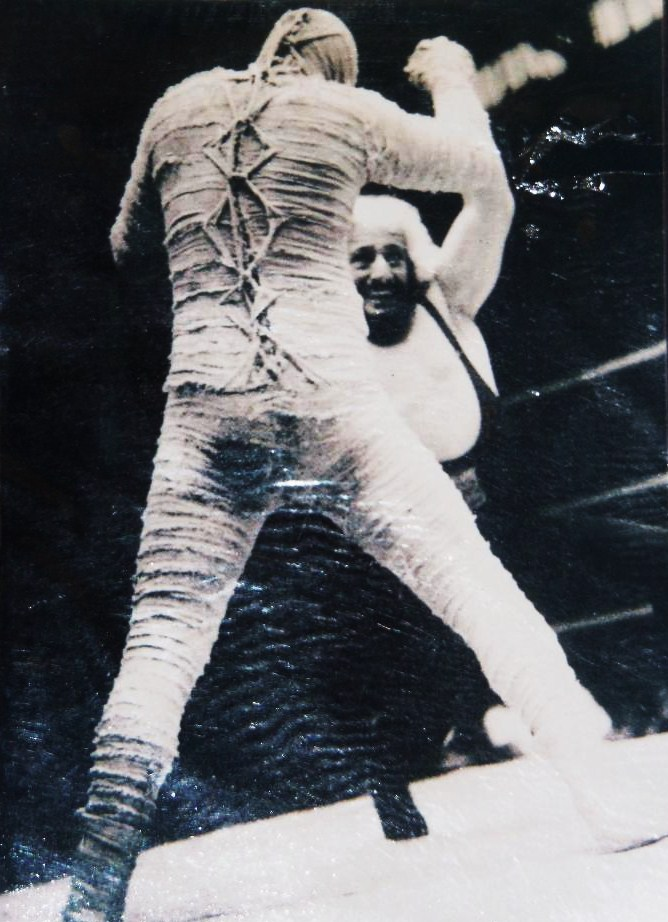
Karadagián vs La Momia 1982

In the late 1960s Titanes en el Ring incorporates a fantastic wrestling match against El Hombre invicible. In 1967 Karadagián was starring in the science fiction classic El hombre invisible ataca with Gilda Lousek, Tristán and Ricardo Passano.

In 1970s Titanes en el Ring moved to Canal 13, Karadagián incorporates fantastic and mythological characters as El Vikingo, Don Quijote y Sancho Panza, D’Artagnan, el Mosquetero, El Acuanauta, Poseidon, El Cavernario, La Momia Negra and others.

In 1972 Karadagián faces La Momia for the world championship. The evening was held at the Luna Park stadium, with a draw.

Other classic wrestling battles included Peucelle vs José Luis, Tenembaum vs Tufic Memet, El Coreano sun vs Silvio, Karadagián vs Ararat el armenio, Karadagián vs Durante, Mercenario Joe vs el Vasco Guipúzcoa, Gitano Ivanoff vs David el Pastor, El Ejecutivo vs Ivanoff. And La Momia blanca vs La Momia negra.

Titanes also had a cheater referee William Boo. Other famous arbiters include Alfredo Giardina, Albert Jaitt, El Conde Schiaffino, Professor Eduardo Davis and Johnny Well.

Titanes en el Ring season of 1982 was one of the most successful, Karadagián incorporates new characters as Mister Moto, el Pibe 10, Julio César, el Romano, El Diabolo, Nerón. The gang El Padrino, Long and Short. And the Brotherhood of Mongols Kanghai el Mongol and Genghis Khan.

Iván Kowalski and Juan Enrique Dos Santos (gitano Ivanoff), were the first wrestlers who had personified La Momia. Juan Manuel Figueroa was La Momia between 1975 and 1988.

Titans in the Ring was narrated and commented by Rodolfo Di Sarli, and Jorge Bocacci was the responsible for the presentation ceremony.

Originally focused on adult audience, during the years it was gradually adapted for targeting a younger audience.

It enjoyed its peak popularity in the early 1970s; in 1972 a Titanes en el Ring music album, featuring the theme songs of the wrestlers, got a large commercial success, and from the same year tapes of the shows started being exported abroad. In 1973 a deal with the Felfort-brand of chocolate bonbons "Jack" also helped to popularize the program and its athletes. In the 1970s the show also did two large tours in Latin America.

Two films based on the show were produced: Titanes en el ring, released in 1973, and Titanes en el ring contrataca, released in 1984.

In the 1990s, Martín Karadagian's daughter tried to re-launch Titanes, but it lasted only a few months.

== Gallery ==
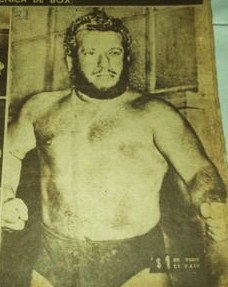
Martín Karadagián in 1952

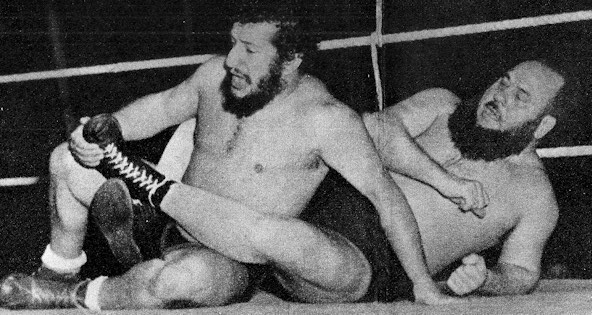
Karadagian vs el Hombre Montaña (pre Titans era)

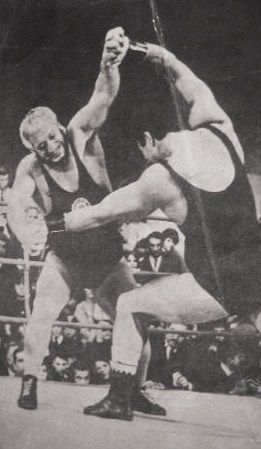
Karadagián fighting

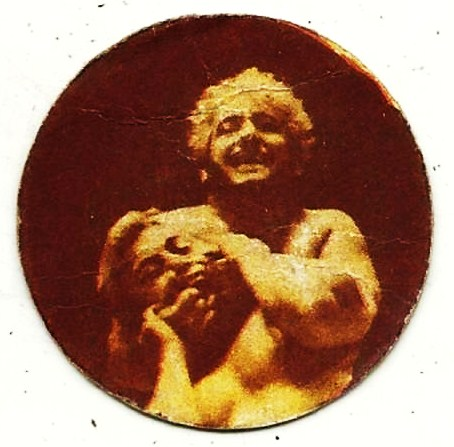
stamp 1960

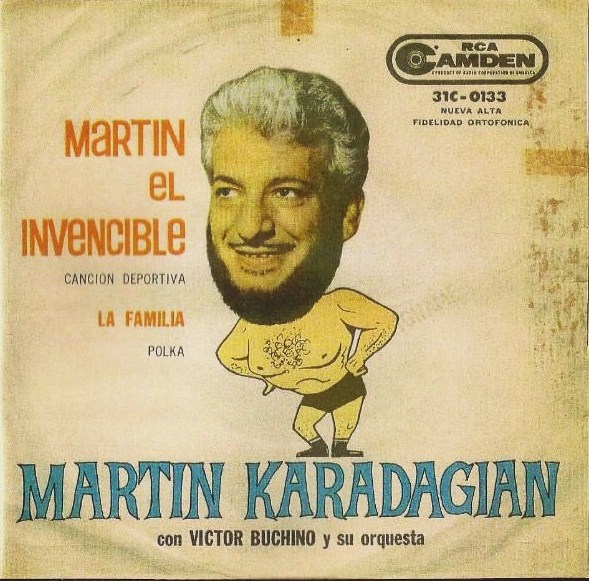
simple album cover (pre Titans era)

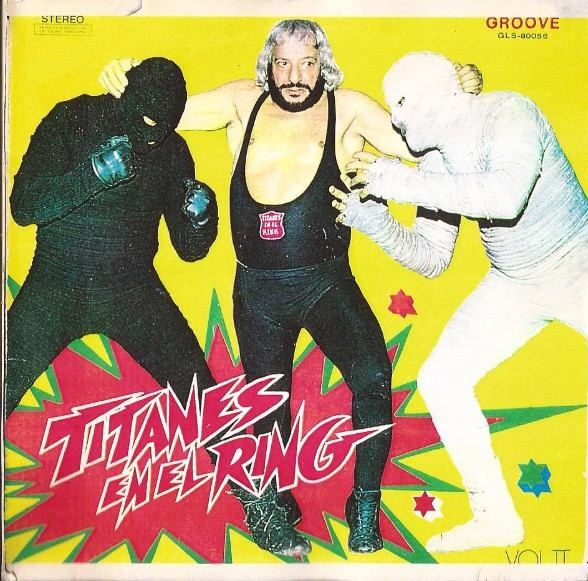
Titans cover disk volume II

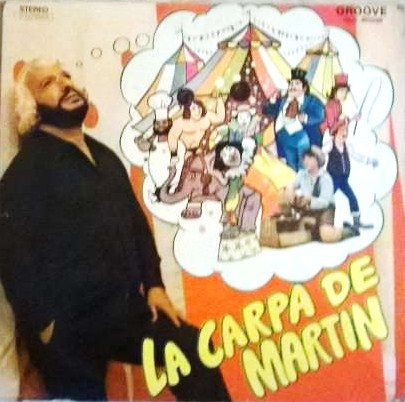
La carpa de Martín (1974) (album cover)

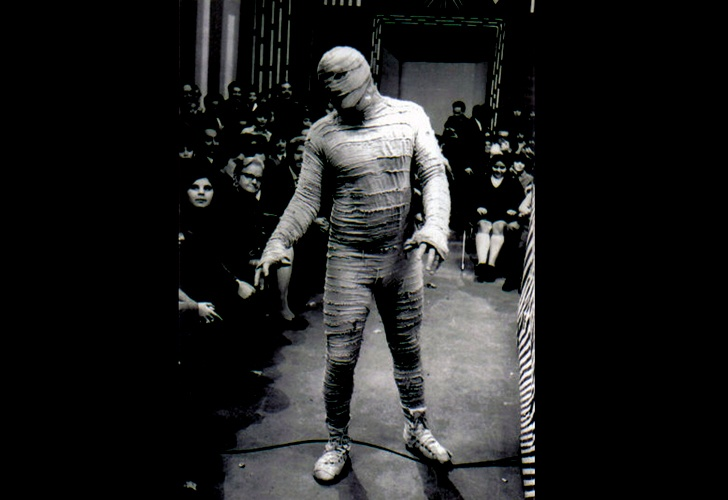
La Momia 1960s

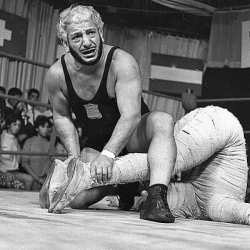
Karadagian vs La Momia 1960s

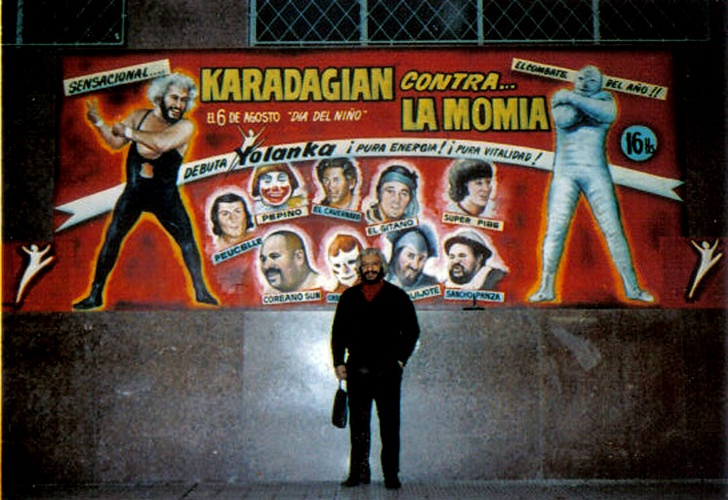
Karadagián in the Luna Park

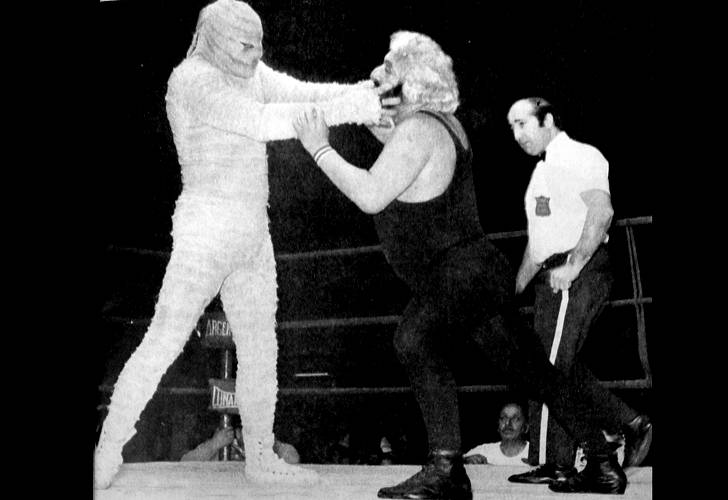
La Momia vs Karadagian 1972

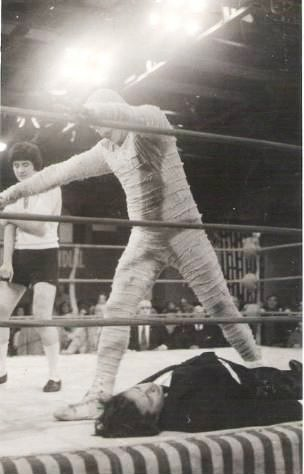
La Momia 1972

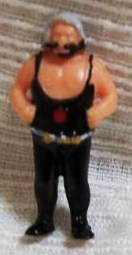
Karadagián Jack figure

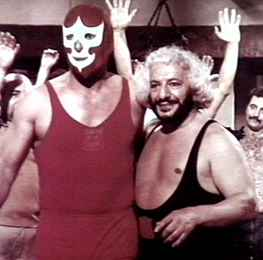
Karadagian y el Caballero Rojo

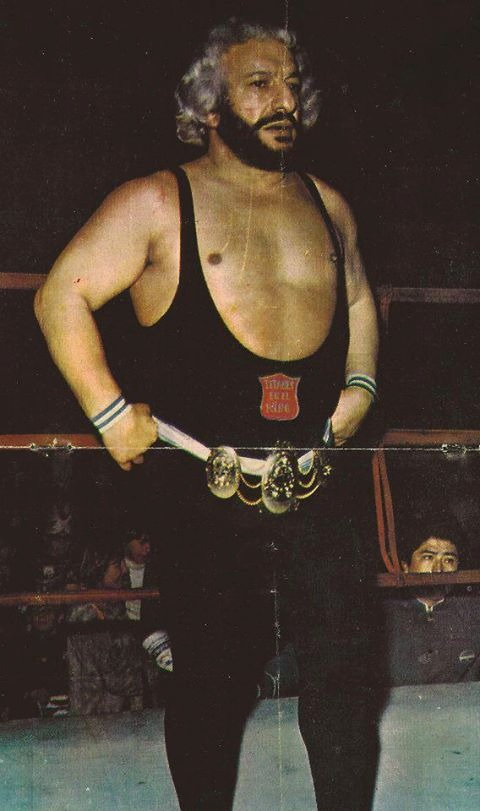
Karadagián with the championship belt

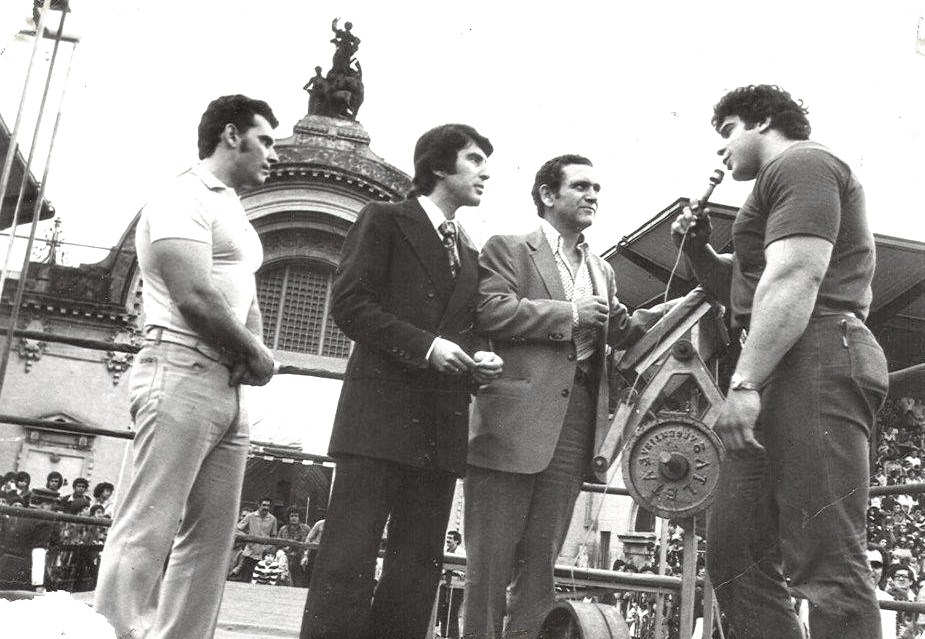
Lou Ferrigno visit to the Titans, with el Vasco Guipúzcoa and Jorge Bocacci

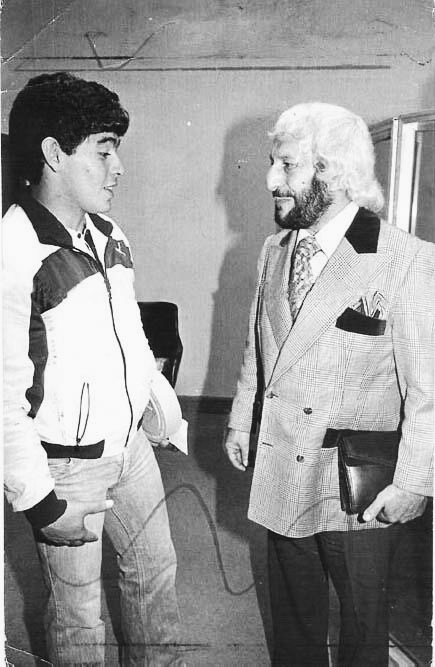
Diego Armando Maradona visit Karadagián

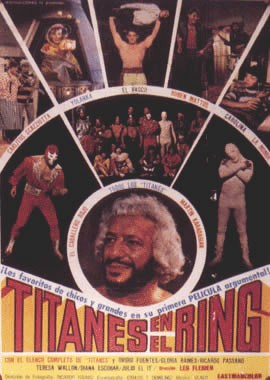
movie poster 1973

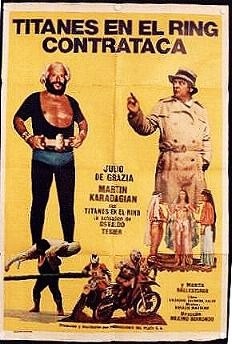
movie poster 1984

== See also ==
- List of professional wrestling television series
