= La Mujer y el jockey (Hipódromo) =

- Screenshot
- Directed by: José Suárez
- Written by: Antonio Botta
- Cinematography: Francis Boeniger
- Edited by: José Cardella
- Music by: Alberto Soifer
- Release date: December 21, 1939
- Country: Argentina
- Language: Spanish

La Mujer y el jockey (Hipódromo) is a 1939 Argentine romantic comedy film directed by José Suárez and written by Antonio Botta. The film premiered in Buenos Aires on December 21, 1939 during the Golden Age of Argentine cinema.

== Cast ==
- Alicia Barrié
- Antonio Capuano
- Dringue Farías
- Severo Fernández
- Dorita Ferreyro
- Vicente Forastieri
- Lalo Malcolm
- César Mariño
- Elvira Quiroga
