= La dama del collar =

La Dama del collar
- Directed by: Luis Mottura
- Edited by: José Gallego
- Music by: George Andreani
- Release date: 1949
- Country: Argentina
- Language: Spanish

La Dama del collar is a 1949 Argentine film of the classical era of Argentine cinema, directed by Luis Mottura and starring Amelia Bence.

== Cast ==
- Guillermo Battaglia
- Amelia Bence
- Margarita Canale
- Warly Ceriani as Maitre
- Manuel Collado
- Rodolfo Crespi as Mozo
