= Warly Ceriani =

Argentine actor

- Born: Luis Antonio Ceriani; 20 October 1903; Buenos Aires, Argentina
- Died: 3 May 1983 (aged 79); Buenos Aires

Warly Ceriani (20 October 1903 – 3 May 1983 in Buenos Aires) was a classic Argentine actor who appeared in major Argentine films from 1938 to 1959.

Ceriani made almost 50 film appearances in Argentina from 1938 to 1959, appearing in films such as Julio Irigoyen's Academia El Tango Argentino (1942).

== Filmography ==
| Year | Title | Role | Notes |
|---|---|---|---|
| 1938 | El último encuentro | Policía 2 | Uncredited |
| 1939 | Closed Door | | |
| 1939 | Our Land of Peace | | |
| 1940 | The Tango Star | Amargado | |
| 1940 | Su nombre es mujer | | |
| 1940 | Carnaval de antaño | Gerente | |
| 1940 | Canto de amor | | |
| 1941 | La mujer del zapatero | | |
| 1941 | When the Heart Sings | | |
| 1942 | La mentirosa | Policía | |
| 1942 | Bajó un ángel del cielo | | |
| 1942 | Gran pensión La Alegría | | |
| 1942 | Academia El Tango Argentino | | |
| 1943 | The Minister's Daughter | Méndez | |
| 1943 | La guerra la gano yo | | |
| 1943 | La suerte llama tres veces | | |
| 1943 | Fuego en la montaña | | |
| 1944 | El fin de la noche | Gaspar | |
| 1944 | His Best Student | | |
| 1945 | Rigoberto | | |
| 1945 | The Soul of a Tango | | |
| 1945 | Saint Candida | | |
| 1945 | Madame Sans-Gêne | | |
| 1945 | Two Angels and a Sinner | | |
| 1946 | Mosquita muerta | | |
| 1946 | Cinco besos | Médico | |
| 1948 | María de los Ángeles | | |
| 1948 | Passport to Rio | Conseje 3 | |
| 1948 | La Rubia Mireya | | |
| 1948 | La calle grita | | |
| 1948 | La dama del collar | Maitre | |
| 1949 | Un tropezón cualquiera da en la vida | Policía | |
| 1949 | Juan Globo | Médico | |
| 1949 | Mujeres que bailan | Profesor Jorge | |
| 1949 | De padre desconocido | | |
| 1949 | La cuna vacía | Médico | |
| 1950 | The Marihuana Story | Director | |
| 1950 | La culpa la tuvo el otro | Dr. Bermúdez | |
| 1950 | School of Champions | | |
| 1950 | Hoy canto para tí | | |
| 1950 | Toscanito y los detectives | Hombre 2 en ascensor | |
| 1951 | Especialista en señoras | | |
| 1951 | Locuras, tiros y mambos | | |
| 1952 | La Bestia debe morir | Guilder | |
| 1952 | Vigilantes y ladrones | Profesor | |
| 1952 | The Unwanted | Médico | Uncredited |
| 1953 | Ellos nos hicieron así | | |
| 1953 | La casa grande | Gutiérrez | |
| 1955 | Pájaros de cristal | | |
| 1955 | Mercado de abasto | Médico | |
| 1955 | The Man Who Owed a Death | Médico 1 | |
| 1955 | Un novio para Laura | Dante Mendoza | |
| 1955 | Bacará | Salías | |
| 1956 | Después del silencio | | |
| 1957 | Puppet | | |
| 1958 | Behind a Long Wall | | |
| 1958 | El hombre que hizo el milagro | | |
| 1959 | Mi esqueleto | | (final film role) |
