= Mi Buenos Aires querido (song) =

1934 song by Carlos Gardel and Alfredo Le Pera

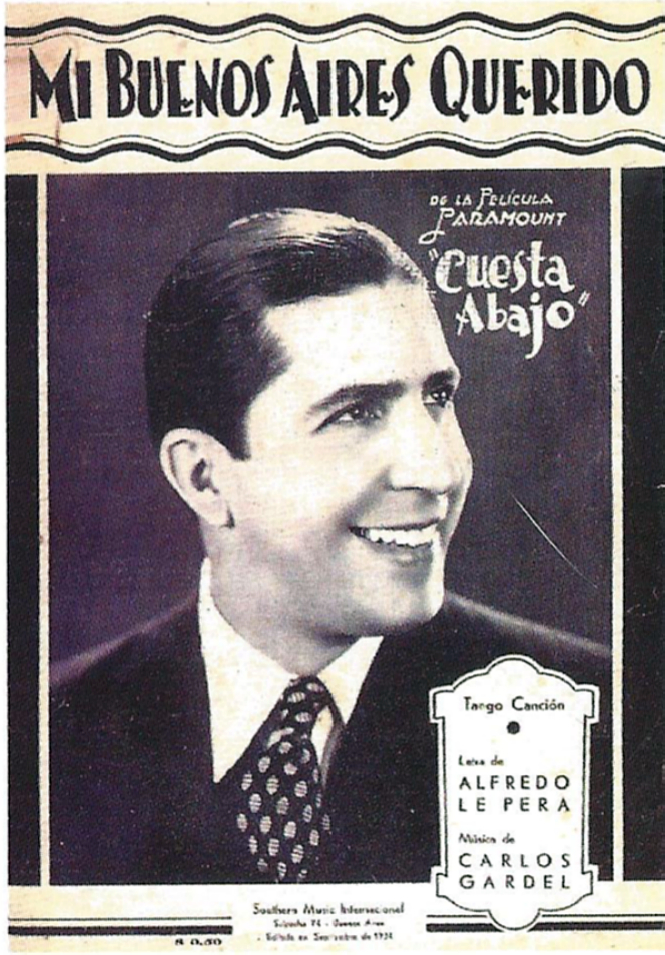
Mi Buenos Aires querido.

'Mi Buenos Aires querido' (English: My Beloved Buenos Aires) is a tango with music by Carlos Gardel and lyrics by Alfredo Le Pera, released in 1934. It is featured on the soundtrack of its eponymous movie directed by Julio Irigoyen.

== Background and Composition ==
As one of Carlos Gardel's most popular songs, this piece reflects on the beauty of Buenos Aires, Argentina. The lines of the song describe and compare the city to the feelings of love and luck, as well as getting rid of the sorrow present in the city when Gardel returns. The entire song is in a 2/4 time signature and starts in the key of B minor. As the song progresses, the key signature changes to the key of B major.

In the beginning tango was associated to the low income population, performed in the poor neighborhoods (Arrabales). Nowadays, learning to perform and swing tango has become a sign of richness and style.

== Uses in popular culture ==
This tango song has appeared in multiple movie soundtracks, lending its title to two films: the 1936 film Mi Buenos Aires querido directed and written by Julio Irigoyen, which is a drama film about the Argentine tango; and a 1961 film of the same name directed by Francisco Múgica.
