= Florindo Ferrario =

Argentine actor

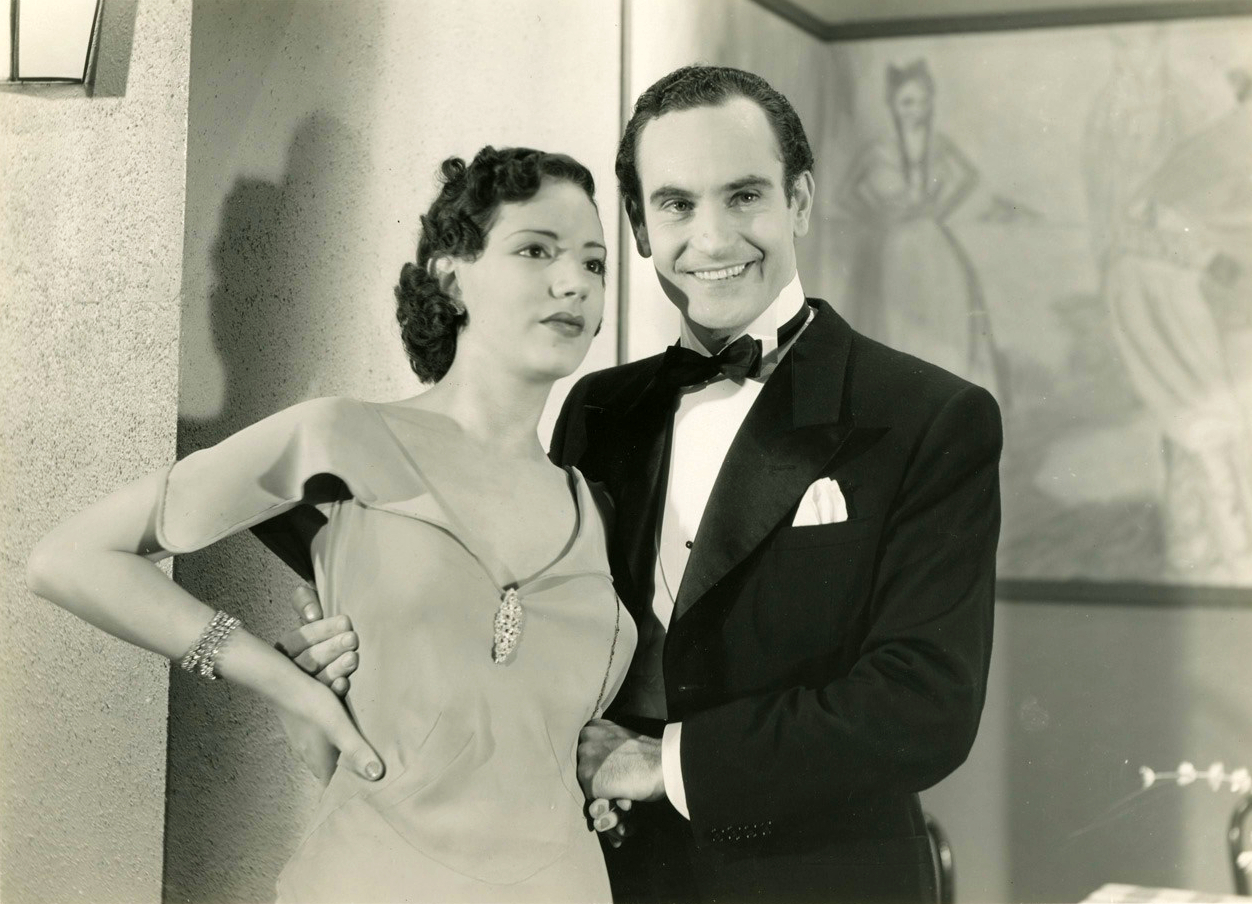
- Florindo Ferrario with Olga Mom in Monte Criollo
- Born: 25 January 1897; Buenos Aires, Argentina
- Died: 30 May 1960 (aged 63); Buenos Aires, Argentina
- Occupation: Actor
- Years active: 1930–58

Florindo Ferrario (25 January 1897 – 30 May 1960) was an Argentine film, stage and radio actor. He appeared in thirty films from 1930 to 1958. As an actor, he was known for The Grandfather (1954), Historia del 900 (1949) and Pachamama (1944).

== Filmography ==
- Las apariencias engañan (1958)
- El Curandero
- Tren internacional (1954)
- La calle del pecado (1954)
- The Grandfather (1954)
- Paradise (1953)
- The New Bell (1950)
- La culpa la tuvo el otro (1950)
- Miguitas en la cama (1949)
- A Story of the Nineties (1949)
- God Reward You (1948)
- La calle grita (1948)
- Romance sin palabras (1948)
- An Ideal Husband (1947)
- The Gambler (1947)
- La cumparsita (1947)
- Two Angels and a Sinner (1945)
- Pachamama (1944)
- Romance de medio siglo (1944)
- Stella (1943)
- Todo un hombre (1943)
- Locos de verano (1942)
- Mar del Plata ida y vuelta (1942)
- La canción que tú cantabas (1939)
- El Loco Serenata (1939)
- Papá Chirola (1937)
- Internado (1935)
- Monte Criollo (1935)…Carlos
- Los tres berretines (1933)
- Los caballeros de cemento (1930)
