= Peucelle =

Peucelle is a French surname. Notable people with the surname include:

- Carlos Peucelle (1908–1990), Argentine football player
- Rubén Peucelle (1933–2014), Argentine wrestler and bodybuilder
