= Volver a vivir =

Volver a vivir may refer to:

- Volver a vivir (film), a 1941 Argentine film
- Volver a vivir (telenovela), a 1996 Venezuelan telenovela
