= El Fogón de los gauchos =

El fogón de los gauchos
- Directed by: Julio Irigoyen
- Written by: Julio Irigoyen
- Produced by: Julio Irigoyen
- Starring: Diana Bernal
- Cinematography: Roberto Irigoyen
- Release date: 1935
- Country: Argentina
- Language: Spanish

El fogón de los gauchos is a 1935 Argentine musical film directed and written by Julio Irigoyen.

== Main cast ==
- Diana Bernal
- Silvia Cecy
- Alberto Miranda
- Roberto Roldán
