= Monte Criollo =

- Directed by: Arturo S. Mom
- Written by: Arturo S. Mom
- Produced by: Arturo S. Mom
- Starring: Francisco Petrone; Nedda Francy; Florindo Ferrario
- Cinematography: Francis Boeniger
- Music by: Francisco Pracanico
- Distributed by: Argentina Sono Film S.A.C.I
- Release date: 3 May 1935 (U.S.)
- Country: Argentina
- Language: Spanish

Monte Criollo is a 1935 Argentine musical film of the Golden Age of Argentine cinema directed and written by Arturo S. Mom. It is a tango film and starred Nedda Francy and Francisco Petrone.

== Other cast ==
- Carlos Fioriti
- Agustín Magaldi
- Azucena Maizani
- Miguel Mileo
- Olga Mom
- Pedro Noda
- Marcelo Ruggero
- Domingo Sapelli
- Marino Seré
- Juan Siches de Alarcón
- Oscar Villa
