= La Dama del mar =

- Directed by: Mario Soffici
- Cinematography: Pablo Tabernero
- Edited by: Vicente Castagno; Nicolás Proserpio
- Release date: 1954
- Running time: 83 minutes
- Country: Argentina
- Language: Spanish

La Dama del mar is a 1954 black-and-white Argentine film directed by Mario Soffici during the classical era of Argentine cinema. It is based on the play The Lady from the Sea by Henrik Ibsen.

== Cast ==
In order of credits:

- Zully Moreno
- Alberto Closas
- Roberto Airaldi
- Ernesto Bianco
- Carlos Cotto
- Mirtha Torres
- Nina Brian
- Fernando Labat
- Jacques Arndt
- Adolfo Calcaño
- Jesús Pampín
