= Encadenado =

- Directed by: Enrique de Rosas
- Written by: Belisario García Villar
- Produced by: Pampa Films
- Starring: Enrique de Rozas, Alita Román, Homero Cárpena
- Cinematography: Pablo Tabernero
- Edited by: Carlos Rinaldi
- Production company: Pampa Film
- Release date: 28 March 1940
- Running time: 79 minutes
- Country: Argentina
- Language: Spanish

Encadenado is a 1940 Argentine romantic drama film of the Golden Age of Argentine cinema. It was shot in Buenos Aires and directed by Enrique de Rosas.

== Plot ==
A reclusive painter who came back to Argentina from war-torn Europe is convinced by a young female disciple to put his career back on track.

== Cast ==
- Alita Román as Elena
- Enrique de Rosas as Leandro Lozano
- Ernesto Raquén as Pablo Lozano
- Homero Cárpena as Martín
- Alberto Terrones as Don Pietro
- Amalia Bernabé as Adelaida
- Pascual Pelliciota as Ferrer
- Alberto De Salvio as Marcial
- José Tresenza as Rogelio
- Pedro Aleandro as Carlos
- Elena Marcó as Lara
