= Alma en pena =

1928 film

- Directed by: Julio Irigoyen
- Release date: 1928
- Country: Argentina
- Language: Spanish

Alma en pena (English language:Soul in Pain) is a 1928 Argentine film directed by Julio Irigoyen.

The film was one of Irigoyen's earliest silent films. The film is about tango dancing, one of the director's many works in this field.

== Production ==
The film was produced by Buenos Aires Film, a company directed by Julio Irigoyen that was characterized by producing “C” class films with very low budget and low artistic quality, which were generally stories with the characteristic characters of the city: handsome prostitutes, tango singers, players in dark cafes, racetracks and aristocratic salons. Most of them were gaucho or typically Buenos Aires films, with tango or inland songs. It is difficult to access information about these films, firstly because some of them were not released in Buenos Aires but in the interior provinces of Argentina and also in other Latin American countries, secondly because Irigoyen did not keep the negatives and thirdly place due to the little interest that the specialized press had in them.
