= Vida y milagros de Don Fausto =

1924 film

- Directed by: Carlos Espejo, Carlos F. Borcosque
- Cinematography: Carlos F. Borcosque
- Production company: Estudios Cinematograficos Borcosque
- Release date: September 1924
- Country: Chile
- Language: Silent

Vida y milagros de Don Fausto ("The Life and Miracles of Jiggs") is a 1924 Chilean animated silent comedy film, the third film of Carlos F. Borcosque which he shot with director Carlos Espejo. It was based on the Bringing Up Father comic strip.

It opened at the Septiembre and Brasil theatres of Santiago in September 1924. It was a major success, an "extraordinary comedy" which made audiences laugh. Borcosque was the cinematographer for the film which was produced under his own Estudios Cinematograficos Borcosque.
