= Puerto nuevo (film) =

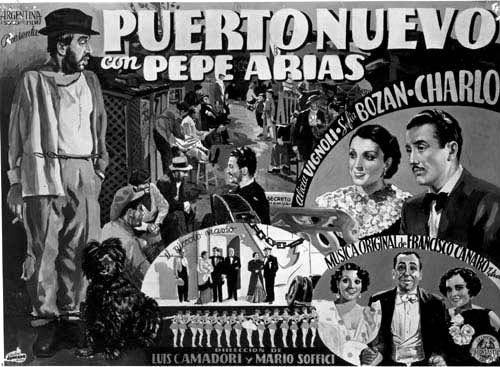
- Directed by: Luis César Amadori; Mario Soffici
- Written by: Luis César Amadori; Antonio Botta
- Produced by: Angel Mentasti
- Cinematography: Francis Boeniger
- Edited by: Daniel Spósito
- Music by: Francisco Canaro; Hans Diernhammer; Luis Angel Gaulier; Luis Rubinstein
- Distributed by: Argentina Sono Film
- Release date: 1936
- Running time: 82 minutes
- Country: Argentina
- Language: Spanish

Puerto nuevo (English: New Port) is a 1936 Argentine tango musical, drama film directed by Luis César Amadori and Mario Soffici during the Golden Age of Argentine cinema. It was written by Amadori and Antonio Botta. The music was performed by Uruguayan musician Francisco Canaro. Club Atlético Puerto Nuevo, founded in 1939, takes its name from the film.

== Main cast ==
- Pepe Arias
- Alicia Vignoli
- Charlo
- Sofía Bozán
- José Gola
- Juan Siches de Alarcón
- Haydée Bozán
- Miguel Gómez Bao
