= Martín Karadagian =

Argentine wrestler and actor

Martín Karadagián
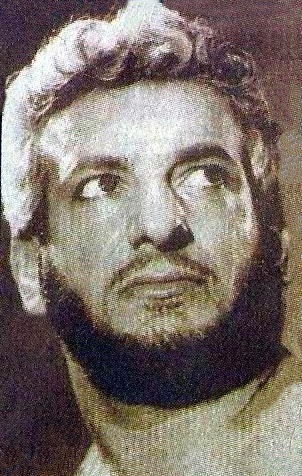
- Born: April 30, 1922; Buenos Aires, Argentina
- Died: August 27, 1991 (aged 69); Buenos Aires, Argentina
- Website: www.titanesenlared.com.ar

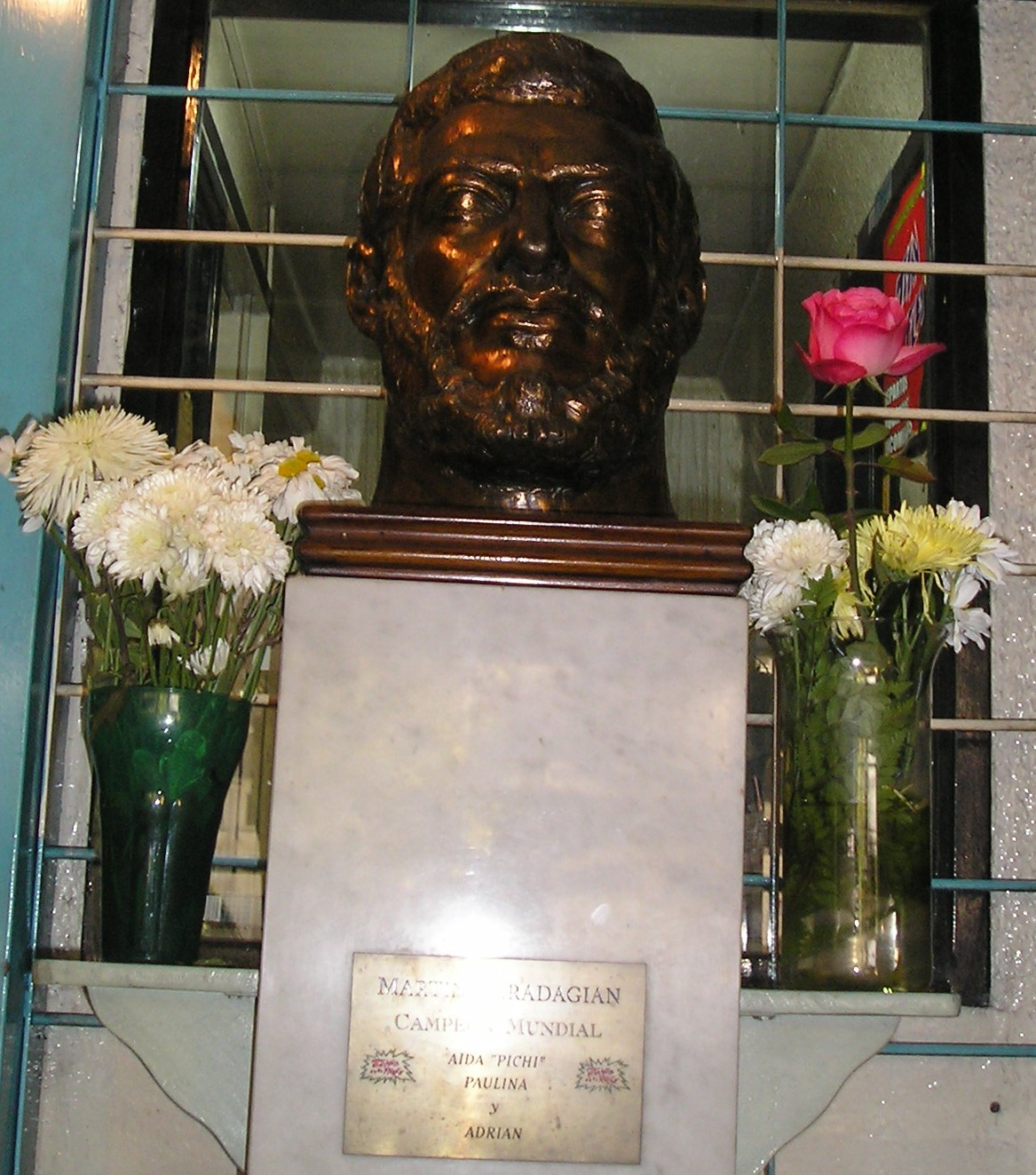
Memorial in Karadagián's gym.

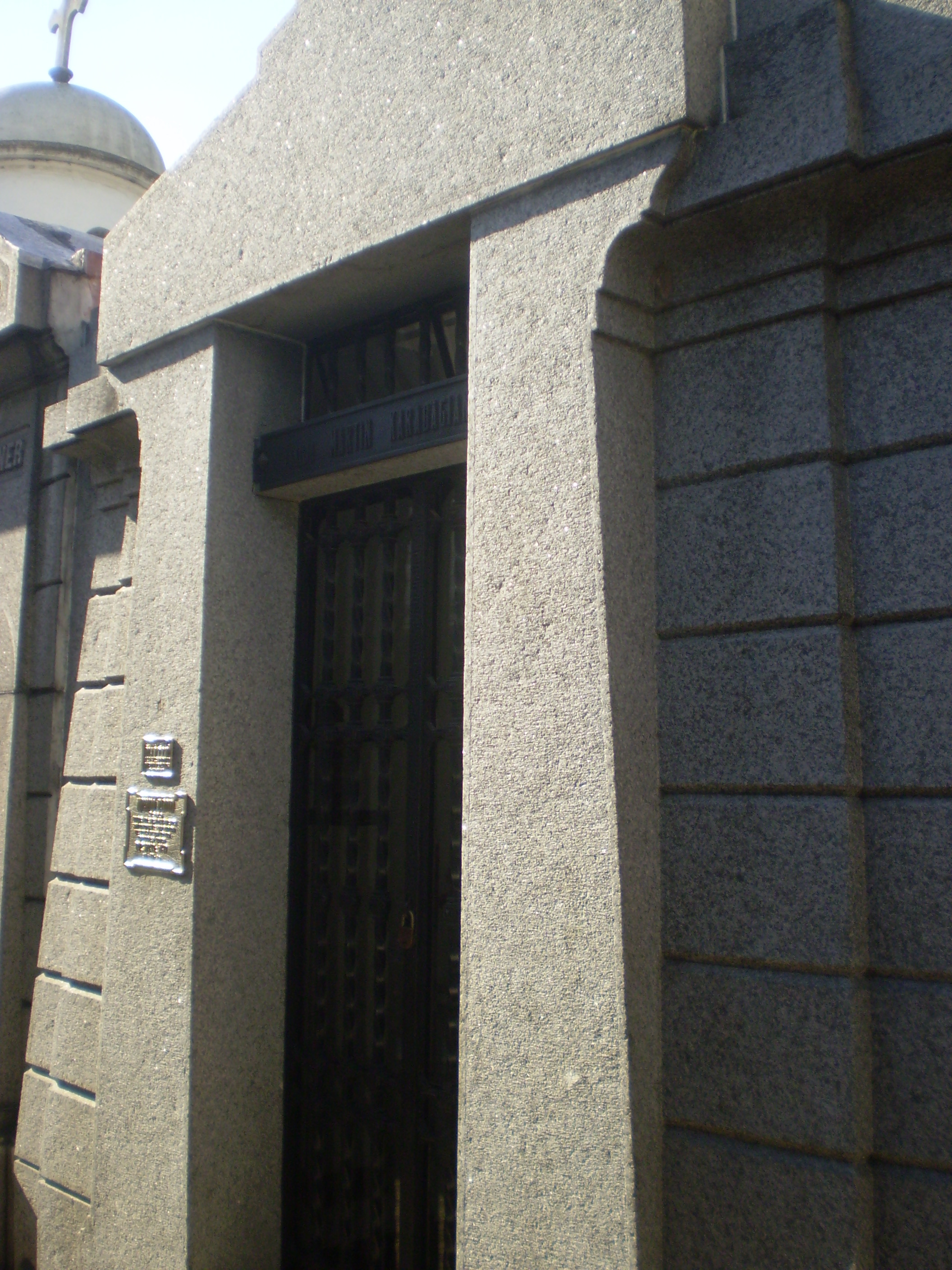
Karadagián's Recoleta crypt.

Martín Karadagián (April 30, 1922 — August 27, 1991) was an Argentine professional wrestler and actor.

== Biography ==
=== Early life ===
Karadagián was born in the San Telmo ward of Buenos Aires to a Spanish mother and Armenian father. He learned Greco-Roman wrestling when he was a child, and won his first national championship in 1947.

=== Career ===
Martin Karadagián wrestled in America from August to December 1949 wrestling in New York City and the surrounding east coast cities such as Asbury Park, New Jersey, Pottsville, Pennsylvania, and Passaic, New Jersey. He wrestled under the name "The Mighty Karadagián (often misspelled Karadijian)." He also held the nickname "the wild man of South America." He was undefeated during this time defeating men like Marvin Mercer, Mike Clancy, Steve Karras, The Golden Superman, and Sam Berg.

He began his career as an actor in the 1957 drama Reencuentro con la gloria (Reencounter with Glory), in which he played a fighter who accidentally kills his opponent. He later appeared in Alberto Olmedo's 1963 comedy, Las Aventuras del Capitán Piluso en el castillo del terror (The Adventures of Captain Piluso at the Castle of Terror).

Karadagián became well known for his recurring role in the wrestling television show Titanes en el ring (Titans in the ring), which aired intermittently from 1962 to 1983. The series became popular elsewhere in Latin America, and during a 1974 episode filmed in Costa Rica, Karadagián reportedly entered into a bout with presidential candidate Gerardo Wenceslao Villalobos (who won).

Karadagián made his last film appearance, with the Titans of the Ring, in 1984. He appeared in a number of yogurt advertisements in his later years, but had developed diabetes, and ultimately had a leg amputated.

=== Death ===
He died in Buenos Aires in 1991, and was buried at La Recoleta Cemetery. A bust of likeness was later unveiled at his Pacheco de Melo Street gym.

== Championships and accomplishments ==
- Wrestling Observer Newsletter

- Wrestling Observer Newsletter Hall of Fame (Class of 2008)

== Filmography ==
- Reencuentro con la gloria (1957)
- Las Aventuras del Capitán Piluso en el castillo del terror (1963)
- El hombre invisible ataca (The Invisible Man Attacks) (1967)
- Titanes en el ring (1973)
- Los superagentes y la gran aventura de oro (The Superagents and the Great Gold Adventure) (1980)
- Titanes en el ring contraataca (1984)
