= The Good Doctor (1939 film) =

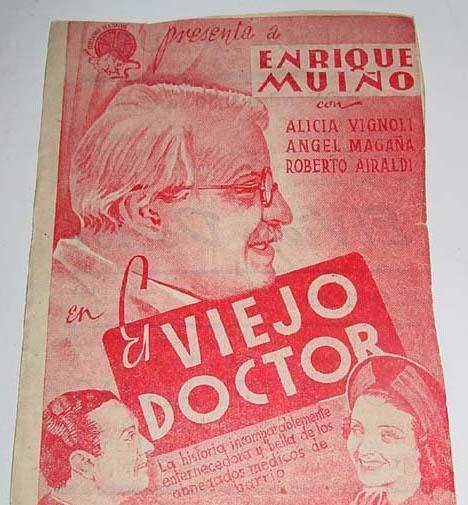
- Directed by: Mario Soffici
- Written by: Enrique Amorim; Carlos A. Olivari
- Starring: Enrique Muiño
- Cinematography: Antonio Merayo
- Edited by: Nicolás Proserpio
- Music by: Rodolfo Sachs
- Distributed by: Argentina Sono Film S.A.C.I
- Release date: 18 January 1939
- Running time: 82 minute
- Country: Argentina
- Language: Spanish

The Good Doctor (Spanish: El Viejo doctor) is a 1939 Argentine film directed by Mario Soffici during the Golden Age of Argentine cinema. The film premiered in Buenos Aires on 18 January 1939 and starred Enrique Muiño.

== Cast ==
- Roberto Airaldi
- Gloria Bayardo
- Dolores Dardes
- Armando Durán
- Inés Edmonson
- Cirilo Etulain
- Ángel Magaña
- Osvaldo Moreno
- Enrique Muiño
- Alberto Terrones
- Alicia Vignoli
