= Chola Luna =

Argentine singer (1919–2015)

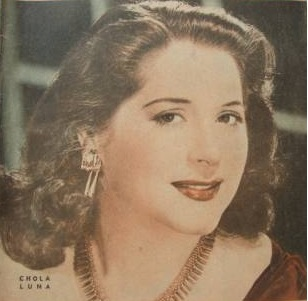
Chola Luna (1946)

Chola Luna (stage name Alcira Carmen Luna; 12 February 1919 - 2 April 2015) was an Argentine tango singer, who flourished during the 1930s through 1950s. From 1955, she was persecuted for her political ideas during the self-appointed dictatorship of the Revolución Libertadora which ousted in a bloody Coup d'état the democratic elected government of Juan D. Peron (1946-1955). Many performers had to stop their profession, including Luna, and others, persecuted and blacklisted for their political beliefs.

== Biography ==
Alcira Carmen Nuñez was born on February 12, 1919, in Buenos Aires into a working-class family, the daughter of Goyo Luna and Maria de Luna. Shortly after her birth, the family moved to La Plata, where she grew up and went to primary school. She sang since childhood, and in 1935, won the contest Puloil. She performed on Radio Belgrano, Argentina's largest radio broadcaster at the time, which allowed her to be hired as a singer on the station.

In 1942, she starred in the film Gran pensión La Alegría, with Julio Irigoyen and performed at the Teatro Nacional. In 1944, she joined the Francisco Canaro orchestra as a singer, singing a duet with Carlos Roldán, with whom she recorded two songs 1944. In 1946, she joined the singing cast of La Historia del Sainete, one of the most successful shows at the time. In 1945, she joined the Francisco Lomuto orchestra, performing with Alberto Rivera Pizarro during a successful tour of Europe. With the election of Juan Perón as president of Argentina in 1946, she identified herself with the ideas of Peronism, participating in activities for the benefit of children and the elderly organized by the Eva Perón Foundation and the Cultural Center of Artists. She sang with the orchestras of Aníbal Troilo, Julio De Caro, Horacio Salgán as well as the orchestra musicians' union led by Mariano Mores.

In 1955, the constitutional presidency Juan Perón was overthrown by the self-appointed dictatorship of the Revolución Libertadora Many performers had to stop their profession, including Luna, and others, persecuted and blacklisted for their political beliefs. After making some recordings with the orchestras of Francisco Trópoli and Miguel Caló, she was exiled in Uruguay, in 1957. In Montevideo, she performed at the Cafe El Ateneo, recorded with the orchestra of Luis Caruso and acted with Alba Solís, who was also persecuted in Argentina. In the 1960s, she returned to Argentina and sang a duet with Julia Vidal, a repertoire of tango and folklore songs. She also served as secretary of the Argentine comic, Pepe Marrone.

== Bibliography ==
- Cassinelli, Roberto; Outeda, Raúl (1998). Anuario del tango. Corregidor. ISBN 9789500510950.
