= The Song of Buenos Aires =

- Directed by: Julio Irigoyen
- Written by: Julio Irigoyen
- Cinematography: Roberto Irigoyen
- Production company: Buenos Aires Film
- Release date: 1945
- Country: Argentina
- Language: Spanish

The Song of Buenos Aires (Spanish: La canción de Buenos Aires) is a 1945 Argentine musical film directed by Julio Irigoyen. It is a tango film, a genre that was popular during the Golden Age of Argentine Cinema.

== Bibliography ==
- Plazaola, Luis Trelles. South American Cinema. La Editorial UPR, 1989.
