= Diablo fuerte =

1925 film

- Directed by: Carlos F. Borcosque
- Written by: Carlos F. Borcosque
- Cinematography: Andrés Martorell De Llanza
- Production company: Estudios Cinematograficos Borcosque
- Release date: 1925
- Country: Chile
- Language: Silent

Diablo fuerte is a 1925 Chilean silent film directed by Carlos F. Borcosque. It stars boxer Luis Vicentini.
