= Las Aventuras del Capitán Piluso en el Castillo del Terror =

Las Aventuras del Capitán Piluso en el castillo del terror
- Directed by: Francis Lauric
- Written by: Humberto Ortiz
- Produced by: Guillermo Teruel
- Starring: Alberto Olmedo; Humberto Ortiz
- Cinematography: Alfredo Traverso
- Edited by: Jorge Levillotti
- Music by: Carlos Illiana
- Release date: 19 December 1963
- Running time: 90 minutes
- Country: Argentina
- Language: Spanish

Las Aventuras del Capitán Piluso en el castillo del terror (The Adventures of Captain Piluso in the Castle of Terror) is a 1963 black-and-white Argentine family comedy film directed by Francis Lauric and written by Humberto Ortiz. The film starred Alberto Olmedo and Humberto Ortiz.

== Cast ==
- Alberto Olmedo .... Capitán Piluso
- Humberto Ortiz .... Coquito
- Lalo Hartich
- Martín Karadagián
- Juan Carlos Barbieri
- Ricardo Carenzo
- Rodolfo Crespi
- José Del Vecchio
- Diego Marcote
- Aldo Mayo
- María Esther Podestá
- Semillita
- Félix Tortorelli

== Filming location and premiere date ==
The movie was filmed on location in Buenos Aires and premiered there on December 19, 1963.
