= I Knew That Woman =

- Directed by: Carlos F. Borcosque
- Written by: Carlos A. Petit
- Cinematography: Alberto Etchebehere
- Edited by: Nicolás Proserpio
- Music by: Agustín Irusta, Mario Maurano
- Release date: 14 January 1942
- Running time: 92 minutes
- Country: Argentina
- Language: Spanish

I Knew That Woman (Spanish: Yo conocí a esa mujer) is a 1942 Argentine melodrama film of the Golden Age of Argentine cinema, directed by Carlos F. Borcosque and starring Libertad Lamarque and Agustín Irusta.

== Cast ==
- Libertad Lamarque
- Agustín Irusta
- Elsa O'Connor
- Elvira Quiroga
- Enrique Chaico
- Nélida Bilbao
- Osvaldo Miranda
- Rafael Frontaura
- Federico Mansilla
- José Antonio Paonessa
- Mecha López
- Eduardo Sosa Lastra
- Elianne Arroyo
- Nélida Plaza
