= La Modelo de la calle Florida =

- Directed by: Julio Irigoyen
- Written by: Julio Irigoyen
- Release date: 1939
- Country: Argentina
- Language: Spanish

La Modelo de la calle Florida is a 1939 Argentine low budget musical film directed by Julio Irigoyen during the Golden Age of Argentine cinema. The tango film premiered in Buenos Aires.
