= The Soul of the Children =

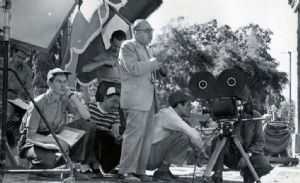
- Director Carlos F. Borcosque on set of El alma de los niños
- Directed by: Carlos F. Borcosque
- Written by: Carlos F. Borcosque
- Starring: Julio Esbrez; Paolo Loew; Carlos Perelli; Maruja Roig
- Release date: 1951
- Country: Argentina
- Language: Spanish

The Soul of the Children (Spanish: El alma de los niños) is a 1951 Argentine melodrama film directed and written by Carlos F. Borcosque during the classical era of Argentine cinema. The film stars Julio Esbrez, Paolo Loew, Carlos Perelli and Maruja Roig.

== Cast ==
- Julio Norberto Esbrez
- Carlos Perelli
- Maruja Roig
- Jorge Ragel
- Nora Gálvez
- Hugo Lanzillotta
- Paola Loew
- Julio J. Malaval
- Fausto Rodríguez
- Carlos Abel Caso
- Francisco Lodrago
- Vito Acquaviva
- Luis Bertolini
- Valo Caneva
- Yoli Vergani
- Mary Lewis
- Nery Smirna
- Antonio Baena
- Miguel Falsa
- Salomón Michitte
- Adolfo Verde
- Jorge Iris
- Juan C. Romero
- Ruben H. Cogni
