= Alicia Vignoli =

Argentine film actress

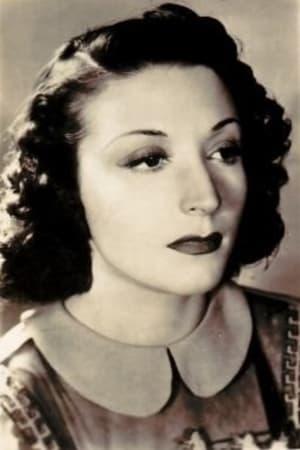
- Alicia Vignoli in Muchachas que estudian (1939).
- Born: 1911; Buenos Aires, Argentina
- Died: 15 July 2005 (aged 93–94); Buenos Aires, Argentina
- Occupation: Actress
- Years active: 1933-1944 (film)

Alicia Vignoli (1911–2005) was an Argentine film actress from the Golden Age of Argentine cinema.

== Filmography ==
- Y era una noche de carnaval (1925)
- La borrachera del tango (1928)
- ¡Tango! (1933)
- Dancing (1933)
- Ayer y hoy (1934)
- Puerto nuevo (1936)
- El pobre Pérez (1937)
- La casa de Quirós (1937)
- ¡Segundos afuera! (1937)
- Palabra de honor (1939)
- El viejo doctor (1939)
- Muchachas que estudian (1939)
- Persona honrada se necesita (1941)
- La canción de los barrios (1941)
- La importancia de ser ladrón (1944)

== Bibliography ==
- Jorge Finkielman. The Film Industry in Argentina: An Illustrated Cultural History. McFarland, 2003.
