= María Turgenova =

Spanish actress, singer and vedette

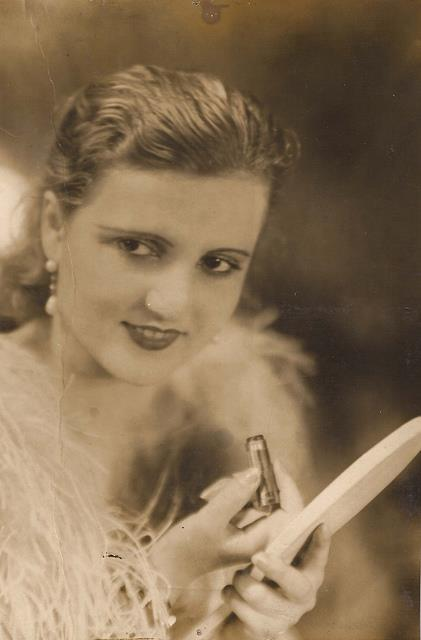
María Turgenova

María Turgenova (1900–1972) was a Spanish actress, singer and vedette, as well as an Argentine silent film star. She was born in Spain and died in Buenos Aires, Argentina.

== Filmography ==
- 1925: El organito de la tarde
- 1926: La costurerita que dio aquel mal paso
- 1926: Muchachita de Chiclana
- 1927: Perdón, viejita
- 1930: El cantar de mi ciudad
- 1930: La canción del gaucho
- 1931: Muñequitas porteñas
