= Martín Rivas (film) =

1925 film

- Directed by: Carlos F. Borcosque
- Written by: Carlos F. Borcosque
- Cinematography: Andrés Martorell De Llanza
- Edited by: Carlos F. Borcosque
- Production company: Estudios Cinematograficos Borcosque
- Release date: 1925
- Country: Chile
- Language: Silent

Martín Rivas is a 1925 Chilean silent film, the fourth film of Carlos F. Borcosque.

== Cast ==
- Juan Cerecer
- Jorge Infante
- Rafael Larson
- Sílvia Villalaz
