= Traición (film) =

1923 film

- Directed by: Carlos F. Borcosque
- Written by: Carlos F. Borcosque, Manuel Gatica
- Cinematography: Andrés Martorell De Llanza
- Edited by: Vicente Castagno
- Production company: Estudios Cinematograficos Borcosque
- Release date: 1923
- Country: Chile
- Language: Silent

Traición is a 1923 Chilean silent film, the second film of Carlos F. Borcosque. It stars María Brieba, Yvonne D'Albert, Jorge Infante and boxer Luis Vicentini.

== Cast ==
- María Brieba
- Yvonne D'Albert
- Jorge Infante
- Luis Vicentini
