= La hija del viejito guardafaro =

La Hija del viejito guardafaro
- Directed by: Julio Irigoyen
- Written by: Julio Irigoyen
- Produced by: Julio Irigoyen
- Starring: Enrique del Cerro
- Cinematography: Roberto Irigoyen
- Release date: 1939
- Running time: 68 minutes
- Country: Argentina
- Language: Spanish

La Hija del viejito guardafaro is a 1939 Argentine film directed by Julio Irigoyen during the Golden Age of Argentine cinema. The film premiered in Buenos Aires and starred Enrique del Cerro.

== Cast ==
- Enrique del Cerro
- Laura Nelson
- Yaya Palau
- Arturo Sanchez
- Warly Ceriani
