= Mi Buenos Aires querido (1936 film) =

- Directed by: Julio Irigoyen
- Written by: Julio Irigoyen
- Starring: Ada Cornaro
- Cinematography: Roberto Irigoyen
- Release date: 1936
- Country: Argentina
- Language: Spanish

Mi Buenos Aires querido is a 1936 Argentine musical film of the Golden Age of Argentine cinema directed and written by Julio Irigoyen. It is a tango film.

The soundtrack of the movie features the tango "Mi Buenos Aires querido" with music by Carlos Gardel and lyrics by Alfredo Le Pera.

== Main cast ==
- Ada Cornaro
- Totón Podestá
- Peter Warne
- Rodolfo Vismara
