= El Cantor de Buenos Aires =

- Directed by: Julio Irigoyen
- Written by: Julio Irigoyen
- Starring: Héctor Palacios, Antonio Podestá and Lea Conti
- Cinematography: Roberto Irigoyen
- Distributed by: Distribuidora Argentina de Film
- Release date: 1940
- Running time: 78 minutes
- Country: Argentina
- Language: Spanish

El Cantor de Buenos Aires is a 1940 Argentine musical film, directed by Julio Irigoyen, and starring Héctor Palacios, Antonio Podestá and Lea Conti.

== Cast ==
- Héctor Palacios
- Antonio Podestá
- Lea Conti
- Arturo Sánchez
- Álvaro Escobar
- Enrique Lomuto
- Haydée Larroca
- Sussy Morales
- Elvita Solans
- Celia Méndez
- Nelly Prince

== Reception ==
Regarding this film, the review in El Mundo stated: "the simplicity of its technical execution matches that of the plot," and the comment in El Heraldo del Cinematografista was: "of primitive, austere, and very modest production, it includes numerous songs." For their part, Manrupe and Portela opined:

"A supplementary film with the sole pretext of showcasing musical numbers and the appeal of a protagonist then known for his radio work. The following year, Irigoyen would repeat the same actor in El cantar de mis penas."

Héctor R. Kohen opined that this was one of Irigoyen's films that served as propaganda for the merits of an orchestra or a singer, as in the case of Héctor Palacios.
