= Rubén Peucelle =

Argentine professional wrestler and bodybuilder

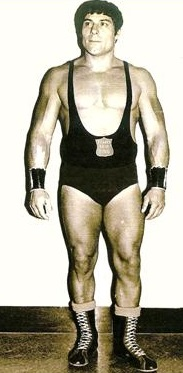

Personal information
- Born: September 2, 1933 Buenos Aires Province, Argentina
- Died: September 8, 2014 (aged 81) Olivos, Buenos Aires, Argentina

Professional wrestling career
- Ring name(s): El Ancho; Hercules Argentino
- Billed height: 5 ft 8 in (173 cm)
- Billed weight: 213 lb (97 kg)
- Debut: 1962
- Retired: 2004

Rubén Peucelle (September 2, 1933 - September 8, 2014) known as "el ancho", was an Argentine professional wrestler and bodybuilder.

== Biography ==
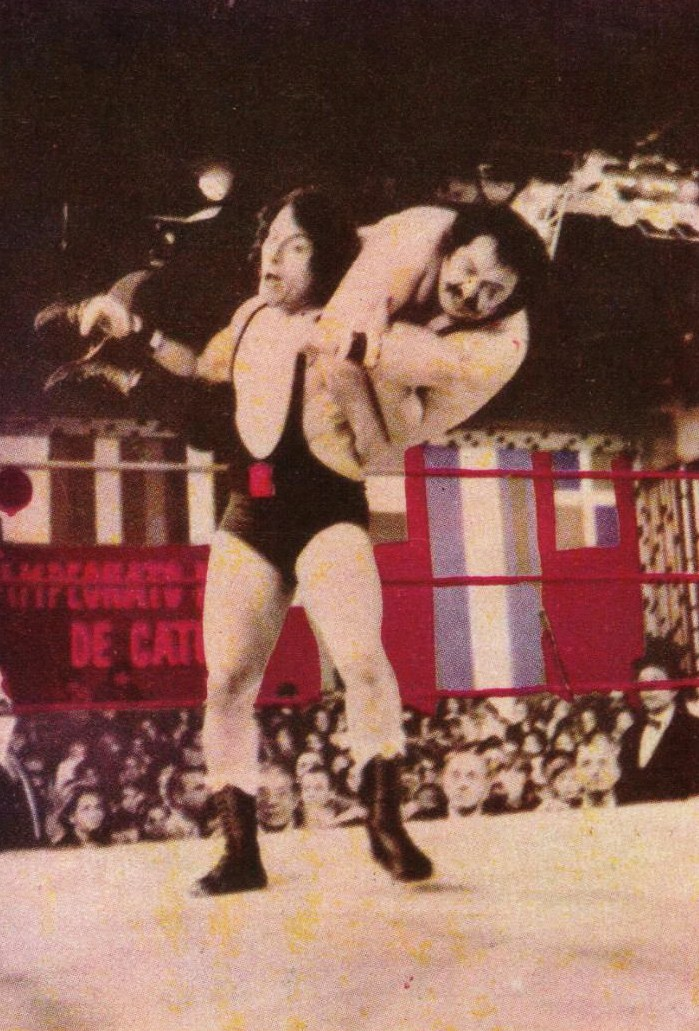
Rubén Peucelle vs Ararat, el Armenio

Rubén Peucelle was born in General Arenales, (Buenos Aires) son of a family of Italian origin. He began his career as a professional wrestler in 1962, in the TV show Lucha libre, issued by canal 13. In 1968 Peucelle made his debut in Titanes en el ring, (owner of Martín Karadagian) the wrestling company's most important in Argentina. He stayed for 20 years with the Titanes making memorable wrestling matches at the stadium Luna Park.

In 1988 Peucelle participated in the TV show Lucha fuerte. He returned to television in 2006 as president of the jury in the program 100% Lucha, issued by Telefe.

== Filmography ==
- Rata de puerto (1964).
- Titanes en el ring (1973)
- Titanes en el ring contraataca (1984).
- Alma mía (1999)
- 100% Lucha (2006)
