= The Strange Case of the Man and the Beast =

1951 Argentine film directed by Mario Soffici

El extraño caso del hombre y la bestia
- Directed by: Mario Soffici
- Written by: Ulyses Petit de Murat + Mario Soffici
- Starring: Olga Zubarry
- Cinematography: Antonio Merayo
- Music by: Silvio Vernazza
- Release date: 1951
- Running time: 80 minutes
- Country: Argentina
- Language: Spanish

The strange case of the man and the beast (Spanish: El extraño caso del hombre y la bestia) is a 1951 Argentine film directed by Mario Soffici during the classical era of Argentine cinema. The screenplay was written by Ulyses Petit de Murat, the photography by Antonio Merayo, the scenography by Gori Muñoz, and the musical direction by Silvio Vernazza. Is an adaptation of Robert Louis Stevenson The strange case of Doctor Jekyll and Mister Hyde.

== Cast ==
- Olga Zubarry
- Rodolfo Crespi
- Rafael Frontaura
