= Palabra de honor (film) =

- Film poster
- Directed by: Luis Cesar Amadori
- Written by: Antonio Botta and Luis Cesar Amadori
- Produced by: Luis Cesar Amadori
- Starring: Luis Sandrini
- Cinematography: José María Beltrán
- Edited by: Javier Aurelio Ruggieri
- Music by: Hans Diernhammer
- Distributed by: Corporación Cinematográfica Argentina
- Release date: May 10, 1939
- Running time: 85 minutes
- Country: Argentina
- Language: Spanish

Palabra de honor (Word of Honor) is a 1939 Argentine comedy film of the Golden Age of Argentine cinema directed by Luis Cesar Amadori, who also co-wrote it with Antonio Botta. The film premiered on May 10, 1939 in Buenos Aires and starred Luis Sandrini.

== Cast ==
- Luis Sandrini ... Pitango
- Alicia Vignoli ... Laura Conde
- María Esther Buschiazzo ... Pitango's mother
- Roberto Airaldi ... Raúl Lucera
- José Casamayor
- Cirilo Etulain
- José Antonio Paonessa ... "Chancho Negro" Patiño
- José Ruzzo ... Ronco
- Alfredo Fornaresio ... Sambayón
