= The Newsie and the Lady =

El Canillita y la dama
- Film poster
- Directed by: Luis César Amadori
- Written by: Luis César Amadori, Antonio Botta
- Starring: Luis Sandrini
- Cinematography: Gumer Barreiros
- Edited by: Emilio Murúa
- Music by: Hans Diernhammer
- Distributed by: Corporación Cinematográfica Argentina
- Release date: 1938
- Running time: 101 minutes
- Country: Argentina
- Language: Spanish

The Newsie and the Lady (Spanish: El Canillita y la dama) is a 1938 Argentine comedy film of the Golden Age of Argentine cinema directed and co-written by Luis César Amadori.

== Cast ==
- Luis Sandrini
- Rosita Moreno
- Lalo Bouhier
- Sara Olmos
- Miguel Gómez Bao
- Juan Mangiante
- Armando de Vicente
- Eduardo Sandrini
- Aurelia Ferrer
- María Esther Buschiazzo

== Reception ==
La Nación commented on the film stating: "It is not inspired by the environment we know but by that of those frothy American films which so frivolously take us to a world of millionaires... borne on the wings of Frank Capra." In his biography of Amadori in the collection "Los directores del cine argentino" (Argentine Cinema Directors), Claudio España comments: "A modern comedy with a predictable ending and an old theme but with much narrative freshness." For their part, Manrupe and Portela write: "A good Sandrini from the early days when he knew what he could do best, enhanced by the director when they first worked together."
