= Galleguita =

- Directed by: Julio Irigoyen
- Written by: Julio Irigoyen
- Starring: Jorge Aldao; Roberto Díaz; Álvaro Escobar
- Cinematography: Roberto Irigoyen
- Release date: 1940
- Running time: 63 minute
- Country: Argentina
- Language: Spanish

Galleguita is a 1940 Argentine musical film written and directed by Julio Irigoyen during the Golden Age of Argentine cinema. It premiered on 28 June 1940.

== Cast ==
- Jorge Aldao
- Roberto Diaz
- Álvaro Escobar
- Haydee Larroca
- Perla Mary
- Ines Murray
- Enrique Vimo
