= El huérfano =

1926 film

- Directed by: Carlos F. Borcosque
- Written by: Carlos F. Borcosque
- Cinematography: Andrés Martorell De Llanza
- Production company: Estudios Cinematograficos Borcosque
- Release date: 1926
- Country: Chile
- Language: Silent

El huérfano is a 1926 Chilean short silent film, the last to be directed in Chile by Carlos F. Borcosque before moving to Hollywood. It stars his eldest daughter María Borcosque and Luis Rojas Müller.
