= Rodolfo Crespi =

Argentine actor

Rodolfo Crespi (left)

Rodolfo Crespi (1921 – August 6, 1980 in Buenos Aires) was an Argentine film actor of the classic era.

Crespi began acting for film in 1939 and made over 30 film appearances between then and his retirement in 1972 in the film Autocine mon amour.

== Partial filmography ==
- Mis cinco hijos (1948)
- La dama del collar (1949)
- Hardly a Criminal (1949)
- Bólidos de acero (1950)
- The Strange Case of the Man and the Beast (1951)
- Searching for Monica (1962)
- Las Aventuras del Capitán Piluso en el Castillo del Terror (1963)
- Hotel alojamiento (1966)
- La Cama (1968)
- Arriba Juventud (1971)
