= Academia El Tango Argentino =

1942 film

- Directed by: Julio Irigoyen
- Written by: Julio Irigoyen
- Produced by: Julio Irigoyen
- Starring: Warly Ceriani; Domingo Conte; Ada Cornaro; Elisa Labardén; Tino Tori; Herminia Velich
- Cinematography: Roberto Irigoyen
- Release date: 1942
- Country: Argentina
- Language: Spanish

Academia El Tango Argentino (English: The Argentine Tango Academy) is a 1942 black and white Argentine musical romantic drama film of the Golden Age of Argentine cinema, directed and written by Julio Irigoyen and written by Julio Porter. It stars Warly Ceriani and Domingo Conte. The movie was filmed in Buenos Aires, Argentina.

The film is about tango dancing, an integral part of Argentine culture.

== Cast ==
- Warly Ceriani
- Domingo Conte
- Ada Cornaro
- Elisa Labardén
- Tino Tori
- Herminia Velich
