= La barra de Taponazo =

1932 film

- Directed by: Alejandro del Conte
- Release date: 9 September 1932
- Country: Argentina
- Language: Spanish

La barra de Taponazo is a 1932 Argentine comedy, drama film directed by Alejandro del Conte. It is poorly soundproofed with discs.

== Cast ==
- Vicente Padula
- Emé Doris
- Carmen Reyes
- Paco Obregón
- Roberto Saghini
- Julio de Caro
- Miguel Gómez Bao
- Julio Andrada
