= Mi esqueleto =

- Directed by: Lucas Demare
- Written by: Alberto Peyrou, Diego Santillán
- Produced by: Luis Giudici, Luis Sandrini
- Starring: Luis Sandrini; Julia Sandoval; Franca Boni
- Cinematography: Américo Hoss
- Edited by: Gerardo Rinaldi, Antonio Ripoll
- Music by: Lucio Demare
- Distributed by: Producciones Luis Sandrini
- Release date: 1959
- Running time: 82 minutes
- Country: Argentina
- Language: Spanish

Mi esqueleto is a 1959 Argentine comedy film directed by Lucas Demare. It stars Luis Sandrini, Julia Sandoval, Franca Boni and Mario Pocoví. César Maranghello called the film a "fiasco".

== Cast ==
- Luis Sandrini
- Julia Sandoval
- Franca Boni
- Mario Pocoví
- Mariano Bauzá
- Carlos Enríquez
- Lalo Malcolm
- Max Citelli
- José María Fra
- Ignacio Finder
- Adolfo Linvel
- Norma Nort
- Orestes Soriani
- Enrique Kossi
- Rafael Diserio
- Antonio Scelfo
- José Guisone
- Juan Alighieri
- Warly Ceriani
- Rogelio Romano
