= Cerro Guanaco =

1959 film by José Ramón Luna

- Directed by: José Ramón Luna
- Written by: José Ramón Luna
- Starring: Mario Amaya, Leyla Dartel, Francisco de Paula
- Cinematography: Alfredo Traverso
- Edited by: Ricardo Rodríguez Nistal, Atilio Rinaldi
- Music by: Eduardo Falú
- Release date: 25 August 1959 (Argentina)
- Running time: 94 min
- Country: Argentina
- Language: Spanish

Cerro Guanaco is a 1959 Argentine film directed by José Ramón Luna.

== Cast ==
- Mario Amaya
- Leyla Dartel
- Francisco de Paula
- Raúl del Valle
- Floren Delbene
- Jorge Lanza
- Margarita Palacios
- Félix Rivero
- León Zárate
