= Paradise (1953 film) =

1953 film

- Directed by: Karl Ritter
- Written by: Karl Ritter; Roberto Talice
- Produced by: Ricco Arendt
- Starring: Paola Loew; Florindo Ferrario; Eloy Álvarez
- Cinematography: Enrique Ritter
- Edited by: Gottfried Ritter
- Music by: Peter Kreuder
- Production company: Laurit Films
- Release date: 5 February 1953
- Running time: 81 minutes
- Country: Argentina
- Language: Spanish

Paradise (Spanish: El paraíso) is a 1953 Argentine drama film directed by Karl Ritter and starring Paola Loew, Florindo Ferrario and Eloy Álvarez. Ritter had been a leading director of propaganda films in Nazi Germany and left for Argentina after the war. This was his only film made in that country and proved a flop. He then briefly returned to West Germany to make a final two films, before retiring to Argentina The film's sets were designed by the art director Saulo Benavente.

== Synopsis ==
A newly-married young couple move from the countryside to try their luck in the city, but soon encounter the downsides of urban life.

== Cast ==
- Eloy Álvarez
- Renée Dumas
- Florindo Ferrario
- Oscar Freyre
- Paola Loew
- Nathán Pinzón
- Eduardo Rudy

== Bibliography ==
- Bock, Hans-Michael & Bergfelder, Tim. The Concise CineGraph. Encyclopedia of German Cinema. Berghahn Books, 2009.
- Giesen, Rolf. Nazi Propaganda Films: A History and Filmography. McFarland & Company, 2003.
