= My Country's Wings =

1939 film by Carlos F. Borcosque

Alas de mi patria
- Directed by: Carlos F. Borcosque
- Written by: Carlos F. Borcosque
- Produced by: Carlos F. Borcosque
- Starring: Enrique Muiño; Pablo Palitos; Delia Garcés
- Cinematography: Alberto Etchebehere
- Edited by: Carlos Rinaldi
- Music by: Hans Diernhammer
- Distributed by: CA Producciones
- Release date: 3 June 1939
- Running time: 90 minutes
- Country: Argentina
- Language: Spanish

My Country's Wings (Spanish: Alas de mi patria) is a 1939 Argentine film directed and written by Carlos F. Borcosque during the Golden Age of Argentine cinema. The film stars Enrique Muiño, Pablo Palitos and Delia Garcés. The film is centered on the lives of men in Argentine Army Aviation.

== Cast ==
- Enrique Muiño
- Pablo Palitos
- Delia Garcés
- Malisa Zini
- Arturo Arcari
- Daniel Belluscio
- Alejandro Beltrami
- Pedro Bibe
- Miguel Coiro
- Ada Cornaro
- Pablo Cumo
- César Fiaschi
- Ricardo Grau
- Lydia Lamaison
- Salvador Lotito
- Claudio Martino
- Percival Murray
- Oscar Valicelli

== Release ==
The film premiered on 3 June 1939.
