= The Soul of a Tango =

- Directed by: Julio Irigoyen
- Written by: Julio Irigoyen
- Starring: Héctor Palacios; Warly Ceriani; Lea Conti; Elisa Labardén; Percival Murray; Tino Tori
- Cinematography: Roberto Irigoyen
- Production company: Buenos Aires Film
- Release date: 20 April 1945
- Running time: 69 mins
- Country: Argentina
- Language: Spanish

The Soul of a Tango (Spanish:El Alma de un tango) is a 1945 Argentine musical film of the classical era of Argentine cinema, directed and written by Julio Irigoyen and starring Héctor Palacios, Elisa Labardén and Lea Conti. The film was part of the popular genre of tango films. It premiered on 20 April 1945.

== Cast ==
- Héctor Palacios
- Elisa Labardén
- Lea Conti
- Percival Murray
- Tino Tori
- Warly Ceriani
- Lea Ocampo
- Mauricio Bilevich
- Trio Gedeón
- Yuria Kramer
- Enrique Vico Carré

== Bibliography ==
- Plazaola, Luis Trelles. South American Cinema. La Editorial UPR, 1989.
