= Su íntimo secreto =

- Directed by: Julio Irigoyen
- Produced by: Buenos Aires Film
- Starring: Mercedes Carné; Felipe Dudán; Elvita Solán
- Release date: 15 May 1948
- Running time: 65 minutes
- Country: Argentina
- Language: Spanish

Su íntimo secreto (English: Her deep secret) is a 1948 Argentine drama film of the classical era of Argentine cinema, directed by Julio Irigoyen. It was premiered on May 15, 1948.

== Cast ==
- Mercedes Carné
- Felipe Dudán
- Elvita Solán
- Alfredo Arrocha
- Héctor Miranda
- Perlita Nogueiro
- Alberto del Solar
- Enrique Vimo
- María Esther Cáceres
- Carlos A. Gordillo
- O.A. Binaghi
- Carlos Coria
