= El Curandero =

- Directed by: Mario Soffici
- Screenplay by: Joaquín Gómez Bas
- Story by: Arturo Lorusso
- Edited by: José Cardella
- Release date: 1955
- Running time: 94 minutes
- Country: Argentina
- Language: Spanish

El Curandero is a 1955 Argentine film directed by Mario Soffici.

== Synopsis ==
After arriving in a small town, a doctor pretends to be a healer to earn the trust of the locals.

== Cast ==
- Mario Soffici
- Élida Gay Palmer
- José de Ángelis
- Jorge De La Riestra
- Florindo Ferrario
- Carmen Giménez
- Ubaldo Martínez
- Duilio Marzio
- Fernanda Mistral
- Pilar Gómez
- Carmen Monteleone
- Jorge Morales
- Mario Perelli
- Jesús Pampín
- Blanca Tapia
