= Canto de amor =

1940 Argentine romantic musical drama film by Julio Irigoyen

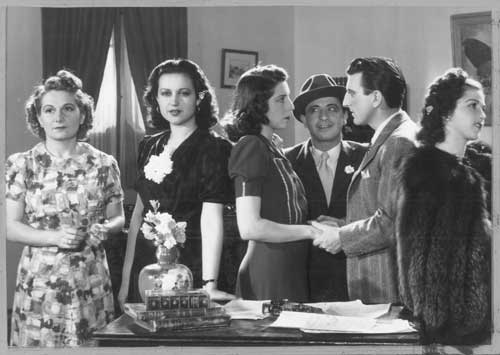
- Photograph taken on set
- Directed by: Julio Irigoyen
- Written by: Julio Irigoyen
- Production company: Buenos Aires Film
- Release date: 1940
- Country: Argentina
- Language: Spanish

Canto de amor is a 1940 Argentine musical melodrama film of the Golden Age of Argentine cinema, directed and written by Julio Irigoyen. It is based on a tango with music by Osvaldo Fresedo. Carlitos Viván and Tino Tori, known for his comic Filomeno Chichipío persona, made appearances opposite Nelly Omar.

It is believed that all copies of the film were destroyed; however, the Argentine film archive at the Museo del Cine Pablo Ducrós Hicken preserves photographs taken in the filming set.

== Cast ==
- Nelly Omar
- Carlitos Viván (Carlos Vivan)
- Herminia Velich
- Tino Tori
- Warly Ceriani
