= Closed Door (1939 film) =

- Directed by: John Alton; Luis Saslavsky
- Written by: John Alton; Luis Saslavsky
- Starring: Libertad Lamarque, Angelina Pagano and Agustín Irusta
- Release date: 1939
- Running time: 105 minutes
- Country: Argentina
- Language: Spanish

Closed Door (Spanish: Puerta cerrada) is a 1939 Argentine drama film directed by John Alton and Luis Saslavsky during the Golden Age of Argentine cinema. The film stars Libertad Lamarque, Angelina Pagano and Agustín Irusta.
