= List of Argentine films of 1959 =

A list of films produced in Argentina in 1959:

Argentine films of 1959
Title	Director	Release	Genre
A - D
Angustias de un secreto	Enrique Carreras	4 June	
Aquello que amamos	Leopoldo Torres Ríos	20 August	
La caída	Leopoldo Torre Nilsson	26 February	drama
Campo arado	Leo Fleider	27 August	
Campo virgen	Leopoldo Torres Ríos	7 May	
El candidato	Fernando Ayala	24 September	drama
El cerco	Claude Boissol	unreleased	
Cerro Guanaco	José Ramón Luna	25 August	
Cómicos	Juan Antonio Bardem	21 May	drama
Culpas ajenas	Carlos Roberto Monti		
Del cuplé al tango	Julio Saraceni	15 October	
El dinero de Dios	Román Viñoly Barreto	15 October	
E - N
En la ardiente oscuridad	Daniel Tinayre	4 June	
En la vía	Alberto Dubois		
Evangelina	Kurt Land	5 March	
Una Gran señora	Luis César Amadori		
Gringalet	Rubén W. Cavallotti	19 July	
He nacido en Buenos Aires	Francisco Mugica	3 September	
Mi esqueleto	Lucas Demare	28 May	
Mis amores en Río	Carlos Hugo Christensen	26 March	
El negoción	Simón Feldman	5 November	
Nubes de humo	Enrique Carreras	14 May	
O - Z
Reportaje en el infierno	Román Viñoly Barreto	17 December	
Sabaleros	Armando Bó	25 February	
Salitre	Carlos Rinaldi	16 April	
La sangre y la semilla	Alberto Du Bois	12 November	
Simiente humana	Sergio Leonardo	22 December	
Las tierras blancas	Hugo del Carril	1 February	
Zafra	Lucas Demare	9 April	

== External links and references ==
- Argentine films of 1959 at the Internet Movie Database
