= Pablo Palitos =

Spanish-born Argentine stage and film actor

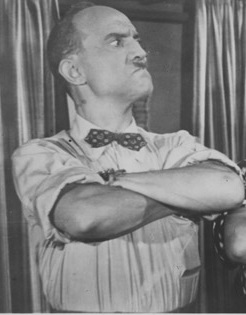
- Born: Pedro Pablo Palos Senger; 8 February 1906; Zaragoza, Aragón, Spain
- Died: February 26, 1989 (aged 83); Buenos Aires, Argentina
- Other names: Pablo Palitos and Palo Seguer
- Occupation: Actor
- Years active: 1933-1984

Pablo Palitos (February 8, 1906 – February 26, 1989) was a Spanish-born Argentine stage and film actor. He was born in Zaragoza as Pedro Pablo Palos Senger, adopting his stage name after emigrating to Argentina. He appeared in twenty one films during his career. His daughter is the actress Graciela Pal and his granddaughter the actress Manuela Pal. Between others, he has been part of the cast of several productions. He made his film debut in Brazil in 1933 at “A Voz do Carnaval”, by Adhemar Gonzaga and Humberto Mauro. Years later, in 1937, he made his debut in Argentina in Palermo, a film where he accompanied Nedda Francy and José Gola. His most outstanding performances were fulfilled in Seconds Outside! The thief sings boleros, Detective and the champion is me, which premiered five years later. In 1940 he starred in the successful comic film Niní must be educated, along with Niní Marshall, Francisco Álvarez and Nury Montsé and a year later he played a supporting role in Boyfriends for Girls, by Antonio Momplet. After performing successful roles in film, he traveled to Spain where he continued his career, and upon his return in Argentina he also acted in radio, television and did secondary roles in film. In the seventies he participated in films such as Olga, the daughter of that Russian princess (with Eduardo Bergara Leumann), The House of Love, The Explosive Adventure, with my wife I cannot and Black Ant, who had little success. He did his last works in “this is Life”, 1982 and accompanied Juan Carlos Altavista (Minguito) and Juan Carlos Calabró in Mingo and Aníbal, two balls against, directed by Enrique Cahen Salaverry in 1984. In theater he made works like Intermezzo in the circus, Irma, the sweet,” The Neighbors of Corrientes” a musical revue starred by Jorge Perez Evelyn, also “A night of love”, and “An angel named Perez”.

== Selected filmography ==
- Palermo (1937)
- My Country's Wings (1939)
- Educating Niní (1940)
- Sweethearts for the Girls (1941)
- White Eagle (1941)
- Detective (1954)
- La Aventura explosive (1977)

== Bibliography ==
- Pellettieri, Osvaldo. Historia del teatro argentino en Buenos Aires: La segunda modernidad (1949-1976). Editorial Galerna, 2005.
