= Ada Cornaro =

Argentine actress, dancer, and singer

- Born: 29 June 1881; Buenos Aires, Argentina
- Died: 19 March 1961 (aged 79); Buenos Aires, Argentina
- Occupation: Actress

Ada Cornaro (29 June 1881 – 19 March 1961) was a prominent Argentine film and theatre actress, tango dancer and singer of the 1930s and 1940s.

Although she entered film in 1924, she became well-known through the hit 1930 tango film Adiós Argentina, in which she starred alongside icon Libertad Lamarque.

She appeared in tango films such as Alas de mi patria (1939); Academia El Tango Argentino and Así te quiero (1942); and Apasionadamente (1944).

She retired from film in 1951 after her last film, Volver a la vida. She died in Buenos Aires a decade later.

== Filmography ==
- Volver à la vida (1951)
- De padre desconocido (1949)
- Cuna vacía, La (1949)
- María de los Ángeles (1948) .... Criolla
- Tambor de Tacuarí, El (1948)
- 24 horas en la vida de una mujer (1944)
- Apasionadamente (1944)
- Son cartas de amor (1943)
- Valle negro (1943)
- Así te quiero (1942)
- Academia El Tango Argentino (1942)
- Professor Cero, El (1942)
- Sendas cruzadas (1942)
- Mujer del zapatero, La (1941)
- Boína blanca (1941)
- Hermano José, El (1941)
- Huella (1940)
- Ojazos de mi negra, Los (1940)
- Pueblo chico, infierno grande (1940)
- Matrero, El (1939)
- Alas de mi patria (1939)
- Callejón sin salida (1938/I)
- Viento norte (1937)
- Mateo (1937)
- The Song of the Riverside (1936)
- Mi Buenos Aires querido (1936)
- Adiós Argentina (1930)
- El Consultorio de Madame René (1924)
