= Volver a vivir (film) =

- Release date: 1941
- Country: Argentina
- Language: Spanish

Volver a vivir is a 1941 Argentine film of the Golden Age of Argentine cinema.

== Cast ==
- Diana Adhemar
- Pedro Beco
- José Castroler
- Héctor Coire
- Aída Fernández
- Rene Fischer Bauer
- Domingo Froid
- Rafael Frontaura
- Niní Gambier
- Carmen Giménez
- Alberto Giralde
- Miguel Inclán
- Antonio Lagrosa
- Pancho López (actor)
- Claudio Martino
