= Goodbye Argentina =

1930 film

Adiós Argentina
- Directed by: Mario Parpagnoli
- Written by: Mario Parpagnoli
- Produced by: Mario Parpagnoli
- Starring: Ada Cornaro; Pieria Dealers
- Release date: 12 March 1930
- Countries: Argentina; Spain; Canada
- Language: Spanish

Adiós Argentina (English language: Goodbye Argentina) is a 1930 Argentine musical film directed and written by Mario Parpagnoli. The film starred Ada Cornaro and Pierina Dealessi. Libertad Lamarque also made an appearance at the age of 22 as the Bride of the Homeless.

Although a silent film, Adiós Argentina was the first Argentine film to ever feature a soundtrack. The film is a musical featuring tango dancing, an integral part of Argentine culture.

== Cast ==
- Ada Cornaro
- M. D'Acuña
- Pierina Dealessi
- Ana Fábregas
- Libertad Lamarque as the Bride of Homeless
- Mario Parpagnoli
- A. Risetto
- Silvio Romano
- Lya Sack
- Carmen Valdés
