= La Virgencita de Pompeya =

- Directed by: Enrique Cadícamo
- Written by: Enrique Pedro Maroni
- Starring: Juan Carlos Cobián
- Release date: March 14, 1935
- Running time: 70 minutes
- Country: Argentina
- Language: Spanish

La Virgencita de Pompeya is a 1935 Argentine musical film drama directed by Enrique Cadícamo and written by Enrique Pedro Maroni. It is a tango film from the Golden Age of Argentine cinema that premiered on 14 March 1935 in Buenos Aires.

== Plot ==
A young woman's dilemma between the old man who protects her and the boy who loves her.

== Main cast ==
- Juan Carlos Cobián
- Luis Díaz
- Santos Landa
- Enrique Pedro Maroni
- Inés Murray
- Nelly Quel

== Reception ==
Domingo Di Núbila wrote that the film was “primitive but not without sympathy” and the critic Néstor wrote in the newspaper El Mundo : “a film of minimal values…poor ingenuity…poor in resources and poor in interest…there are errors of all kinds.”
