= The Singer of My City =

1930 film

El Cantar de mi ciudad
- Film poster
- Directed by: José A. Ferreyra
- Written by: José A. Ferreyra
- Produced by: Juan Glize
- Starring: Antonio Ber Ciani; Esther Calvo
- Release date: 3 October 1930
- Country: Argentina
- Language: Spanish

El Cantar de mi ciudad (English language: The Singer of My City) is a 1930 Argentine film directed and written by José A. Ferreyra. The film has historical significance as it was the first ever sound film produced in Argentina. The film was released on 3 October 1930.

== Cast ==
- Antonio Ber Ciani as Hermenegildo
- Esther Calvo as La Loba
- Alvaro Escobar as Garufa
- Felipe Farah
- Arturo Forte as Maldonado
- Lina Montiel as Marimoña
- María Turgenova as La muchacha del tango
- Mario Zappa as Jilguero
