= List of Argentine films of 1930 =

A list of films produced in Argentina in 1930:

Argentine films of 1930
Title	Director	Release	Genre
A – Z
Adiós Argentina	Mario Parpagnoli	12 March	Musical
El cantar de mi ciudad	José A. Ferreyra	3 October	Drama
Viejo smoking	Eduardo Morera		Musical
