= The Invisible Man Attacks =

- Directed by: Martin Rodriguez Mentasti
- Starring: Martín Karadagián; Gilda Lousek; Tristán; Ricardo Passano
- Edited by: Gerardo Rinaldi
- Music by: Rodolfo Arizaga
- Color process: Color
- Release date: 2 March 1967
- Running time: 80 minutes
- Country: Argentina
- Language: Spanish

The Invisible Man Attacks (Spanish: El Hombre invisible ataca) is a 1967 Argentine comedy film directed by Martin Rodriguez Mentasti.

== Cast ==
- Martin Karadagián
- Gilda Lousek
- Tristan
- Ricardo Passano
- Joe rigoli
- Guillermo Battaglia
- Nathan Pinzón
- Gobbi dart
- Mila Demarie
- The Gypsy Ivanoff
- Oscar Orlegui
- Susana Mayo
