= El cantar de mis penas =

- Directed by: Julio Irigoyen
- Written by: Julio Irigoyen
- Release date: 1941
- Country: Argentina
- Language: Spanish

El cantar de mis penas is a 1941 Argentine film of the Golden Age of Argentine cinema.

"El cantar de mis penas" translates to "The Song of My Sorrows" in English.

== Credited cast ==
- Héctor Palacios
- Laura Nelson
- Lea Conti
- Enrique Vimo
- Ramón Vila
