= Mi Buenos Aires querido (1961 film) =

1961 film by Francisco Múgica

- Directed by: Francisco Mugica
- Written by: Rodolfo Manuel Taboada
- Starring: Alberto Argibay; José Marco Davó; Mario Fortuna
- Release date: 1961
- Country: Argentina
- Language: Spanish

Mi Buenos Aires querido is a 1961 Argentine film directed by Francisco Mugica to a script by Rodolfo Manuel Taboada and original music by es:Sebastián Piana and Francisco Canaro. It was premiered on 28 March 1961. The cast featuresh Mario Fortuna, María Luisa Robledo, Gilda Lousek and Enzo Viena.
