= List of Argentine films of 1932 =

A list of films produced in Argentina in 1932:

Argentine films of 1932
Title	Director	Release	Genre
A - Z
La barra de Taponazo	Alejandro del Conte	9 September	Comedy
En el infierno del Chaco	Roque Funes	21 December	Documentary
Rapsodia gaucha	José A. Ferreyra		Drama
