= Our Land of Peace =

- Directed by: Arturo S. Mom
- Written by: Henri Martinet
- Produced by: Henri Martinet
- Starring: Pedro Tocci
- Cinematography: Roque Funes
- Edited by: José Cardella
- Music by: Alejandro Gutiérrez del Barrio; Henri Martinet
- Release date: July 4, 1939
- Running time: 90 minute
- Countries: Argentina; Spain
- Language: Spanish

Our Land of Peace (Spanish: Nuestra tierra de paz) is a 1939 Argentine-Spanish biographical film of the Golden Age of Argentine cinema directed by Arturo S. Mom. The film, a biopic of Argentina's Father of the Nation José de San Martín, premiered in Buenos Aires and starred Pedro Tocci.

== Cast ==
- Pedro Tocci as José de San Martín
- Elsa Martinez as Remedios de Escalada/ Mercedes de San Martín
- Emperatriz Carvajal as América
- Salvador Arcella as Juan Gregorio de Las Heras
- Francisco Audenino as Domingo French
- Pedro Bibe as Cornelio Saavedra
- Fernando Campos
- Warly Ceriani as Feliciano Chiclana
- Dario Cossier
- José De Angelis
- Fausto Fornoni as Juan Bautista Cabral
- Miguel Frontaura as Juan José Paso
- Henri Martinent
- Héctor Méndez
- Antonio Medoya as Antonio Beruti
- Manuel Ochoa
- Juan José Piñeiro
- Ángel Prio
- Enrique Vico Carré

== Synopsis ==
The film is a biography of General José de San Martín (1778-1850), a central figure of the Independence of Argentina, Chile and Peru, as told by a grandfather to his grandson.

== Reception ==
Critics have characterized the film as a docudrama narrated "in layers", too schematic and linear, and representing the sanitized portrait of a hero. On the positive side, they highlighted the solid performances and the movie's intent and quality.
