= Claudio Martino =

Argentine stage and film actor

- Born: Argentina
- Died: 1979; Argentina
- Occupation: Actor
- Years active: 1938–1967 (film)

Claudio Martino was an Argentine stage and film actor.

== Selected filmography ==
- My Country's Wings (1939)
- Seven Women (1944)
- This Is My Life (1952)

== Bibliography ==
- Jorge Abel Martín. Cine argentino. Ediciones Corregidor, 1978.
