= Antonio Botta =

Antonio Botta (10 December 1896 - 10 May 1969) was a Spanish language dramatist and screenwriter. He was born in Brazil, but it was in Argentina that he built his career and made his name.

== Biography ==
Antonio Botta was born in the Brazilian city of São Paulo. His first important premier came in 1926 with "Falucho", a one-act musical drama vignette, performed at the Porteño Theatre ("Teatro Porteño") in Buenos Aires by the Luis Arata company. Further scripts quickly followed. Stage directors and theatre impresarios with whom he worked included his brother, Américo Botta, Luis César Amadori, Ivo Pelay, José González Castillo, Elías Alippi, Carlos Osorio and Antonio De Bassi. There were also musical collaborations with Antonio and Arturo de Bassi, Francisco Lomuto and Francisco Canaro.

Several of Botta's film scripts were co-written with the Italian-born Argentinian Luis César Amadori who then went on to direct the resulting film himself. One relatively early result of that process was Puerto nuevo (film), a tango musical film which had its first showings in a cinema in a Buenos Aires slum quarter ("Villa Miseria"). Three years later, in 1939, Botta himself tried his hand at directing, with his production of Bartolo tenía una flauta (loosely, "Bartolo had a flute"), starring Luis Sandrini.

Antonio Botta also wrote a number of radio plays and several songs.

He teamed up with the composer-musician Francisco Lomuto to write a number of works, such as the song "Si soy así" (loosely, "Yes, that's how I am"), a slinky tangoesque song of celebration addressed to all women, regardless of age or marital status. The composition caught the spirit of the age: the well known tango performer Carlos Gardel made a recording. Another particularly successful collaboration by Botta and Lomuto, albeit with a very different spirit, was "La canción del deporte" (loosely, "The song of sports"). In 1947 Antonio Botta and Francisco undertook a successful tour of Spain together.

== Output ==
=== Stage works ===
- Se casa la trotamondos (con Antonio Molinari)
- Que lindo es casarse! (con Américo Botta)
- Muerte rea!
- Duraznito de la Virgen
- Qué luna de miel, mamita!
- San Cristóbal Colón y el otro...
- El cañón catalán
- La Parada 33
- Knock – Out con Antonio de Bassi
- Gringo, pero buen sastre (with Américo Botta)
- Veranito de San Juan (with Vicente Cotal)
- El mercado de Abasto (with Antonio Molinari Lopardi)
- ¡A divertirse muchachos!,
- ¡Esto es Buenos Aires!,
- ¡Qué lindo es casarse!,
- Sardina que lleva el gato!,
- Argentinas en Sevilla
- La patria del tango
- Gramilla brava
- La solterona del barrio
- El vuelo de la cigüeña
- El sinvergüenza Público N° 1
- El cantar de los tangos
- ¡Que pena me da el finao!
- Cocktail San Martín
- El sueño del peludo
- La cosa es no trabajar
- La mujer es peligrosa
- ¡Todo por casarme en martes!
- Pabellón N° 4
- ¡No se jubile don Pancho!
- Las andanzas de un ropero
- Fascismo casero.
- El vivo vive del zonzo (with Marcos Bronenberg)

=== Films ===
as script writer

- Santa Cándida (1945)
- Napoleón (1941)
- La hora de las sorpresas (1941)
- La mujer y el jockey (1939)
- Chimbela (1939)
- 24 horas en libertad (1939)
- Palabra de honor (1939)
- El canillita y la dama (1939)
- Maestro Levita (1938)
- El pobre Pérez (1937)
- Puerto Nuevo (1936)

as director

- Bartolo tenía una flauta (1939)

=== Other song lyrics etc. ===
- Ay mi nena (Vals)
- Callecita de mi novia (Tango)
- Canillita canillita (Tango)
- Dice una canción (Tango)
- La canción del deporte (Marcha)
- Papanata - (feminine version) (Tango)
- Papanata - (masculine version) (Tango)
- Propina (Tango)
- Si soy así (Tango)
