= Gran pensión La Alegría =

- Release date: 1942
- Country: Argentina
- Language: Spanish

Gran pensión La Alegría is a 1942 Argentine comedy-drama film directed by Julio Irigoyen during the Golden Age of Argentine cinema.
