= Rigoberto =

- Directed by: Luis Mottura
- Written by: Julio Porter
- Starring: Enrique Serrano; Rafael Frontaura
- Cinematography: Alfredo Traverso; Julio César Lavera
- Edited by: Nello Melli
- Music by: George Andreani; Enrique Pedro Delfino
- Release date: 1945
- Country: Argentina
- Language: Spanish

Rigoberto is a 1945 Argentine comedy film directed by Luis Mottura during the classical era of Argentine cinema.

A man finances the invention of a friend overshadowed and dominated by the women of his family.
