= Arturo S. Mom =

Argentine screenwriter and film director

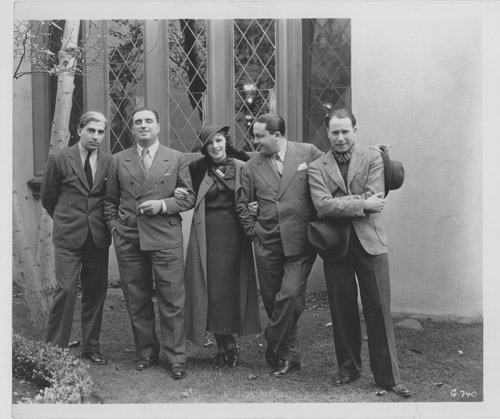
Mom

Arturo S. Mom (December 2, 1893 - ? in La Plata Buenos Aires Province) was an Argentine screenwriter and film director notable for his work during the Golden Age of Argentine cinema.

He wrote and directed films such as Monte Criollo (1935), Crazy Dandy (1936), Palermo (film) (1937), Our Land of Peace (1939) and Albergue de mujeres (1946).

== Selected filmography as director ==
- El Tango en París (1956)
- Albergue de mujeres (1946)
- A Woman of No Importance (1945)
- Our Land of Peace (1939)
- Busco un marido para mi mujer (1938)
- Villa Discordia (1938)
- Palermo (1937)
- Crazy Dandy (1936)
- Petróleo (1936)
- Monte Criollo (1935)
