= Carlos F. Borcosque =

Chilean film director and screenwriter

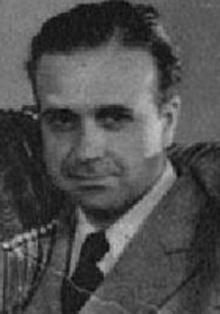
Carlos F. Borcosque

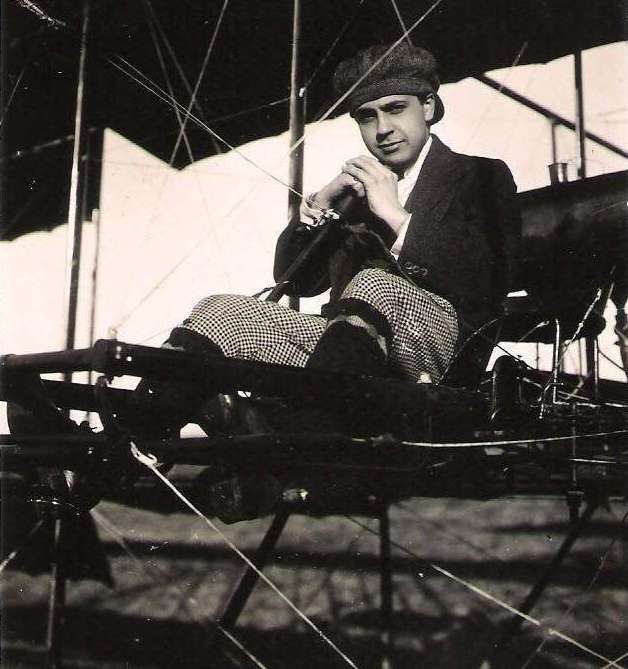
Borcosque as a young director

Carlos Francisco Borcosque Sánchez (9 September 1894 – 5 September 1965) was a Chilean film director and screenwriter notable for his work during the Golden Age of Argentine cinema.

Borcosque was born in Valparaíso. He established Estudios Cinematográficos Borcosque in Santiago in 1922 and directed several Chilean silent movies before he moved to Hollywood in 1926 where he worked as a consultant on Latin-based movies, and had a spell working for Paramount Pictures. Between 1922 and his death in 1965 Borcosque was responsible for directing and screenwriting mostly simultaneously some 45 different feature films including the 1951 film El alma de los niños. He died in Buenos Aires.

== Filmography as director ==
- Hombres de esta tierra (1922)
- Traición (1923)
- Vida y milagros de Don Fausto (1924)
- Martín Rivas (1925)
- Diablo fuerte (1925)
- El huérfano (1926)
- Wu Li Chang (1930)
- En cada puerto un amor (1931)
- La mujer X (1931)
- Su última noche (1931)
- Cheri-Bibi (1931)
- Dos noches (1933)
- Fighting Lady (1935)
- Alas de mi patria (1939)
- ...Y mañana serán hombres (1939)
- Nosotros, los muchachos (1940)
- Flecha de oro (1940)
- Una vez en la vida (1941)
- La casa de los cuervos (1941)
- Cada hogar un mundo (1942)
- Yo conocí a esa mujer (1942)
- Incertidumbre (1942)
- Un nuevo amanecer (1942)
- La juventud manda (1943)
- Valle negro (1943)
- La verdadera victoria (1944)
- Veinticuatro horas en la vida de una mujer (1944)
- Amarga verdad (1945)
- Éramos seis (1945)
- Cuando en el cielo pasen lista (1945)
- Corazón (1947)
- Siete para un secreto (1947)
- El tambor de Tacuarí (1948)
- Las aventuras de Jack (1949)
- La muerte está mintiendo (1950)
- Volver a la vida (1951)
- El alma de los niños (1951)
- Facundo, el tigre de los llanos (1952) (co-director)
- Su obra de amor (1952) (documentary)
- El Calavera (1954)
- Grumete (1956)
- Pobres habrá siempre (1958)
- Mientras haya un circo (1958)
- Voy a hablar de la esperanza (1966)
