= Roberto Irigoyen =

Argentine cinematographer

Roberto Irigoyen was an Argentine cinematographer who worked in Argentine cinema between 1923 and 1948.

As the brother of director Julio Irigoyen, Roberto began a career in cinematography in 1923 working chiefly in the major films produced by his brother. His first film was De nuestras pampas. He worked on films such as the 1942 film Academia El Tango Argentino.

His last film Su íntimo secreto was released in 1948.

== Filmography ==
- The Soul of a Tango (1945)
