= Mario Soffici =

Argentine film director, actor and screenwriter

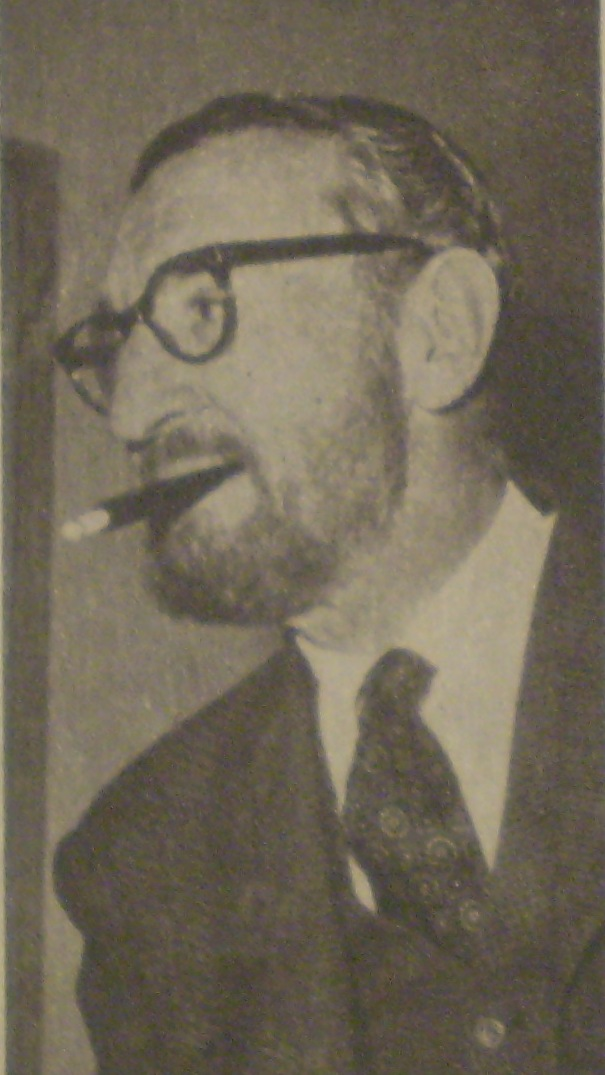
- Mario Soffici
- Born: 14 May 1900; Rocciolato, Italy
- Died: 10 May 1977 (aged 76); Buenos Aires, Argentina
- Years active: 1932 - 1977
- Notable work: Prisioneros de la tierra (1939); Rosaura a las 10 (1958)

Mario Soffici (14 May 1900 – 10 May 1977) was an Italian-born Argentine film director, actor and screenwriter notable for his work during the Golden Age of Argentine cinema.

== Biography ==
Mario Soffici was born in Florence, Italy and moved to Argentina at the age of nine. He began acting in 1931 and made his directorial debut in 1935 on the film El Alma de Bandoneón, working with popular actors of the period such as Libertad Lamarque in tango-based musical films. He directed some 40 films between 1935 and 1962, including Prisioneros de la tierra (1939) (historically considered one of the greatest in Argentine cinema), El Curandero (1955), El hombre que debía una muerte (1955) and Rosaura a las 10 (1958). He directed and co-wrote with Eduardo Boneo and Francisco Madrid La cabalgata del circo.

He died in Buenos Aires in 1977.

== Filmography ==
=== As director ===
- Noche federal (1932)
- El alma del bandoneón (1935)
- La barra mendocina (1935)
- New Port (1936)
- Cadetes de San Martín (film) (1937)
- Viento Norte (1937)
- Kilómetro 111 (1938)
- El viejo doctor (1939)
- Prisioneros de la tierra (1939)
- Héroes sin fama (1940)
- Cita en la frontera 1940)
- Yo quiero morir contigo (1941)
- El camino de las llamas (1942)
- Vacaciones en el otro mundo (1942)
- Cuando la primavera se equivoca (1942)
- Tres hombres del río (1943)
- Wake Up to Life (1945)
- The Circus Cavalcade (1945)
- Besos perdidos (1945)
- La pródiga (1945)
- Celos (1946)
- The Sin of Julia (1946)
- La gata (1947)
- La Secta del trébol (1948)
- Tierra del Fuego (1948)
- La barca sin pescador (1950)
- El extraño caso del hombre y la bestia (1951)
- The Unwanted (1951)
- Pasó en mi barrio (1951)
- Ellos nos hicieron así (1953)
- Una ventana a la vida (1953)
- La Dama del mar (1954)
- Mujeres casadas (1954)
- Barrio gris (1954)
- El hombre que debía una muerte (1955)
- El Curandero (1955)
- Oro bajo (1956)
- Rosaura a las 10 (1958)
- Isla brava (1958)
- Chafalonías (1960)
- Propiedad (1962)

=== As screenwriter ===
- El alma del bandoneón (1935)
- La barra mendocina (1935)
- Viento Norte (1937)
- Con las alas rotas (1938)
- The Circus Cavalcade (1945)
- Una ventana a la vida (1953)
- La dama del mar (1954)
- Barrio gris (1954)
- Oro bajo (1956)
- Rosaura a las 10 (1958)
- Isla brava (1958)
- Los acusados (1960)
- Propiedad (1962)

=== Actor ===
- Streets of Buenos Aires (1934)
- Yesterday's Guys Used No Arsenic (1976)

== Bibliography ==
- Tomas Abraham article about Soffici (in Spanish)
