= Julio Irigoyen =

Argentine film director

- Born: July 1, 1894; Buenos Aires, Argentina
- Died: August 29, 1967 (aged 73); Buenos Aires, Argentina
- Occupation: Film director
- Years active: 1923–1948
- Notable work: Academia El Tango Argentino, Su íntimo secreto

Julio Irigoyen (1 July 1894 – 29 August 1967 Buenos Aires) was an Argentine film director notable for his work during the Golden Age of Argentine cinema.

Irigoyen began directing in 1923. His first film was De Nuestras Pampas. He directed films such as the 1942 film Academia El Tango Argentino.

His last film Su íntimo secreto was released in 1948. He died in Buenos Aires in 1967, in the same house where he had been born.

== Filmography ==
=== As director ===
- De nuestras pampas (1923)
- El guapo del arrabal (1923)
- Galleguita (1923)
- La aventura del pasaje Güemes (1924)
- El último gaucho (1924)
- Sombras de Buenos Aires (1924)
- La cieguita de la Avenida Alvear (1924)
- Los misterios del turf argentino (1924)
- Padre nuestro (1925)
- Tu cuna fue un conventillo (1925)
- Alma en pena (1928)
- Los misterios de Buenos Aires (1935)
- El Fogón de los gauchos (1935)
- Mi Buenos Aires querido (1936)
- The Song of the Riverside (1936)
- Sierra Chica (1938)
- Plegaria gaucha (1938)
- La Modelo de la calle Florida (1939)
- La hija del viejito guardafaro (1939)
- La cieguita de la avenida Alvear (1939)
- Sombras de Buenos Aires (1939)
- Canto de amor (1940)
- Su nombre es mujer (1940)
- El Cantor de Buenos Aires (1940)
- Galleguita (1940)
- Un pobre rico (1941)
- El cantar de mis penas (1941)
- La mujer del zapatero (1941)
- Academia "El Tango Argentino" (1942)
- Gran pensión La Alegría (1942)
- Cantando se van mis penas (1943)
- Un muchacho de Buenos Aires (1944)
- La Canción de Buenos Aires (1945)
- El alma de un tango (1945)
- Su íntimo secreto (1948)
- El fogón de los gauchos (1953)
