= Lilian Valmar =

Argentine actress and vedette

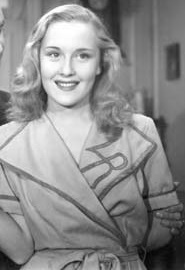
- 1949
- Born: Celia María Damestoi; 27 September 1928; Buenos Aires, Argentina
- Died: 4 August 2013 (aged 84); Buenos Aires, Argentina
- Resting place: La Chacarita cemetery
- Occupation(s): Actress, vedette
- Spouse: Oscar Casco

Celia María Damestoi (27 September 1928 – 4 August 2013), better known as Lilian Valmar, was an Argentine actress and vedette.

== Biography ==
Lilian Valmar was born in Argentina, coming of age during the country's golden period of cinema which spanned from 1947 to 1956. She began her career in 1947 in the film Albéniz by Luis César Amadori. A year later, she began to work with the greats of the comedy genre, partnering with revue director Manuel Romero on the film The Tango Returns to Paris, Niní Marshall on Porteña de corazón (1948) and Catita es una dama (1956), Pepe Iglesias on Avivato (1949), and Alfredo Barbieri on Ritmo, amor y picardía (1955) and El sonámbulo que quería dormir (1956).

She then began the second phase of her career within the New Wave movement (1960–1966) with director Enrique Carreras, who directed her in a trilogy of films. She began with the bizarro genre in Obras maestras del terror (1960), horror stories starring Narciso Ibáñez Menta, which was then followed by the New Wave film Un viaje al más allá (1964), and the last was the comedy-drama Arm in Arm Down the Street (1966). In television she entered the golden age of telenovelas (1971–1985), appearing in her first in 1971 with Alma Bressan's Una luz en la ciudad. She then appeared in Me llaman gorrión (1972) by Abel Santa Cruz and Libertad condicionada (1985) by Marta Reguera, both on Channel 9.

As a radio actress, she was an exclusive figure of Radio El Mundo. In theater she showed her talent as a vedette, and later as a dramatic actress, forming a company with Enrique Serrano in 1956.

Lilian Valmar died of natural causes on 4 August 2013 at age 84. Her remains rest in the Argentine Actors Association pantheon of La Chacarita cemetery.

== Films ==
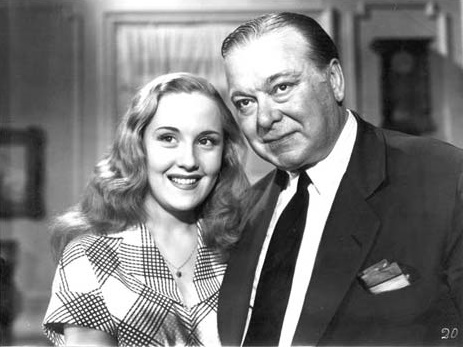
With Alberto Terrones in the film Avivato

- Albéniz (1947)
- Song of Dolores (1947)
- Vacaciones (1947)
- The Tango Returns to Paris (1948)
- El cantor del pueblo (1948)
- Porteña de corazón (1948)
- The Bohemian Soul (1949)
- Avivato (1949)
- Ritmo, amor y picardía (1955)
- El sonámbulo que quería dormir (1956)
- Catita es una dama (1956)
- Obras maestras del terror (1960)
- Un viaje al más allá (1964)
- Arm in Arm Down the Street (1966)

== TV series ==
- Una luz en la ciudad (1971)
- Me llaman gorrión, Channel 9 (1972)
- Papá corazón (1973)
- Festival de grandes comedias, with Oscar Casco and Julia Alson (1974)
- Entre el amor y el poder, Channel 9 (1984)
- Libertad condicionada, Channel 9 (1985)

== Theater ==
- Mi marido hoy duerme en casa, at the Teatro Apolo (1954)
- Boina blanca (1956)
- El lustrador de manzanas, comedy in three acts premiered by the company of Luis Arata at the Teatro Marconi (1957)
- Criaturas rebeldes, together with Ubaldo Martínez, Maruja Montes, Don Pelele, Alfredo Barbieri, Nené Cao, Gloria Montes, Oscar Villa, Oscar Valicelli, Beba Bidart, Thelma del Río, and Rafael García (1960)
- Blum, play by Enrique Santos Discépolo and Julio Porter, together with Zulma Faiad, Juan Verdaguer, and Silvia Legrand (1963)
- Departamento de soltero, directed by Eduardo Sánchez Torel at the Teatro Florida (1963)
- Los cocodrilos (1966)
- Payasín y Bonín (1966)
- El caso del señor Valdemar, together with Osvaldo Pacheco
