= La rubia del camino =

1938 Argentine film

- Directed by: Manuel Romero
- Written by: Manuel Romero
- Starring: Paulina Singerman
- Cinematography: Luis F. Romero
- Edited by: Juan Soffici
- Music by: Francisco Lomuto
- Production company: Lumiton
- Release date: April 6, 1938 (Buenos Aires)
- Running time: 80 minutes
- Country: Argentina
- Language: Spanish

La rubia del camino (lit. 'The Blonde of the Road') is a 1938 Argentine comedy film written and directed by Manuel Romero, starring Paulina Singerman and produced by the Lumiton studio during the Golden Age of Argentine cinema. Inspired by the American screwball comedy It Happened One Night (1934), by Frank Capra, it tells the story of a wealthy, haughty young woman who runs away from her engagement party, meets a working-class truck driver during a journey and begins a romance that leads her to rethink her life and her class prejudices.

The film belongs to a prolific stage in Romero's career; he was one of the most successful Argentine directors of the 1930s, known for the speed at which he shot and for a style that appealed to mass taste through the urban popular culture of Buenos Aires. Like much of his work from this period, La rubia del camino stages the conflict between the upper class—presented as selfish and foreign-oriented—and the working class, associated with morality and the authentically Argentine identity; for this reason it has been considered a forerunner of Peronist discourse. Singerman's character, one of the first active female figures with initiative in Argentine cinema, is among the incarnations of the "modern girl" archetype.

It was a success and established a formula that Romero would repeat with Singerman in Isabelita (1940) and Elvira Fernández, vendedora de tienda (1942), in which the actress consolidated her typecasting role of the capricious millionairess. The film is considered one of the most representative titles in her filmography.

== Plot ==
The aristocratic Betty (Paulina Singerman) with her parents (Alberto Terrones and María Esther Buschiazzo) and her grandfather (Juan José Porta) in Bariloche.

Betty, an upper-class modern girl, haughty and contemptuous of anyone outside her circle, is staying at the Llao Llao Hotel in Bariloche with her parents, Don Emilio and Doña Elvira, and her grandfather, where that night she is to announce her engagement to her boyfriend, Raúl. To her annoyance, Raúl has gone on an excursion to Cerro Tronador with other guests, and she suspects this is an excuse to cheat on her with Inés, an older widow. Betty goes off to play golf with Malipieri, a foreign count who insists on marrying her. Back at the hotel, she catches Raúl and Inés openly flirting in the bar, confronts them and announces that she is breaking off her engagement and will marry Malipieri.

At that night's celebration—which has shifted from marking the engagement to Raúl to that of the count—Betty cannot hide her distress and escapes in her car, without a chauffeur, heading for Buenos Aires. Her flight causes alarm, since news had broken that day of a prison break from the Bariloche jail. Raúl and Malipieri set out to look for her in another car but take the wrong road at a fork; after driving all night they decide to return to the hotel, not before getting a flat tyre. Meanwhile, Betty runs out of petrol in the middle of the road and is picked up by Julián, a working-class haulier on his way to Buenos Aires, whom she persuades to take her to the city so as not to be left stranded.

Betty and Julián (Fernando Borel) arrive at Batista's house (Marcelo Ruggero) while his wife is in labour.

At the Llao Llao, the family and the two suitors receive news from the police: the abandoned car has been found and they assume the young woman changed clothes and took a train to Buenos Aires. Betty and Julián hear on the radio that the police are searching for her, and he helps her hide when they are stopped by two mounted policemen. Shortly afterwards they are accosted by two of the escaped prisoners, who try to rob the truck, but Julián fights them off. The pair stop at the house of Lucía—a young woman in love with Julián—and her father, where Betty, after some resistance, agrees to eat empanadas, sleep for a while and put on one of Lucía's dresses. While Julián and Lucía share a moment alone, Betty wakes up and demands that they resume the journey that very night, which leads to a confrontation with Lucía, who is left distraught as she watches them leave.

Little by little, Betty drops her overbearing attitude: she wraps herself in Julián's jacket and sleeps on his shoulder, he teaches her to drink mate for the first time, and they pick up an abandoned puppy from the road. They stop for lunch at the home of Batista, an Italian customer of Julián's, whom they find in despair because his wife, Marietta, has gone into labour. Although she has no experience, Betty successfully delivers the baby and is moved by the experience. More at ease now, and in contrast to her earlier rejection of music, she asks Julián to turn on the radio and the two sing a tango. For the rest of the trip Betty and Julián fall in love, and she becomes active: she fills up the tank, drives, and shares salami and bread.

On arriving at the family home in Buenos Aires with Julián, Betty introduces him as her boyfriend and announces that she has become a new woman. She then tries to adapt him to her social class, changing his clothes and taking him to social events, but Julián cannot adjust to that life and decides to leave her and go back to his job as a truck driver. When he goes to visit his friend Batista, he finds Betty waiting for him there. She tells him that from now on she will be called by her real name Isabel, and the two resume their romance and set off together in the truck.

== Cast ==
- Paulina Singerman as Betty
- Enrique Serrano as Count Malipieri
- Marcelo Ruggero as Batista
- Sabina Olmos as Lucía
- Fernando Borel as Julián
- María Esther Buschiazzo as Doña Elvira
- Juan José Porta as the Grandfather
- Enrique Roldán as Raúl
- Mary Dormal as Inés
- Alberto Terrones as Don Emilio
- María Vitaliani as Marietta

== Production and style ==
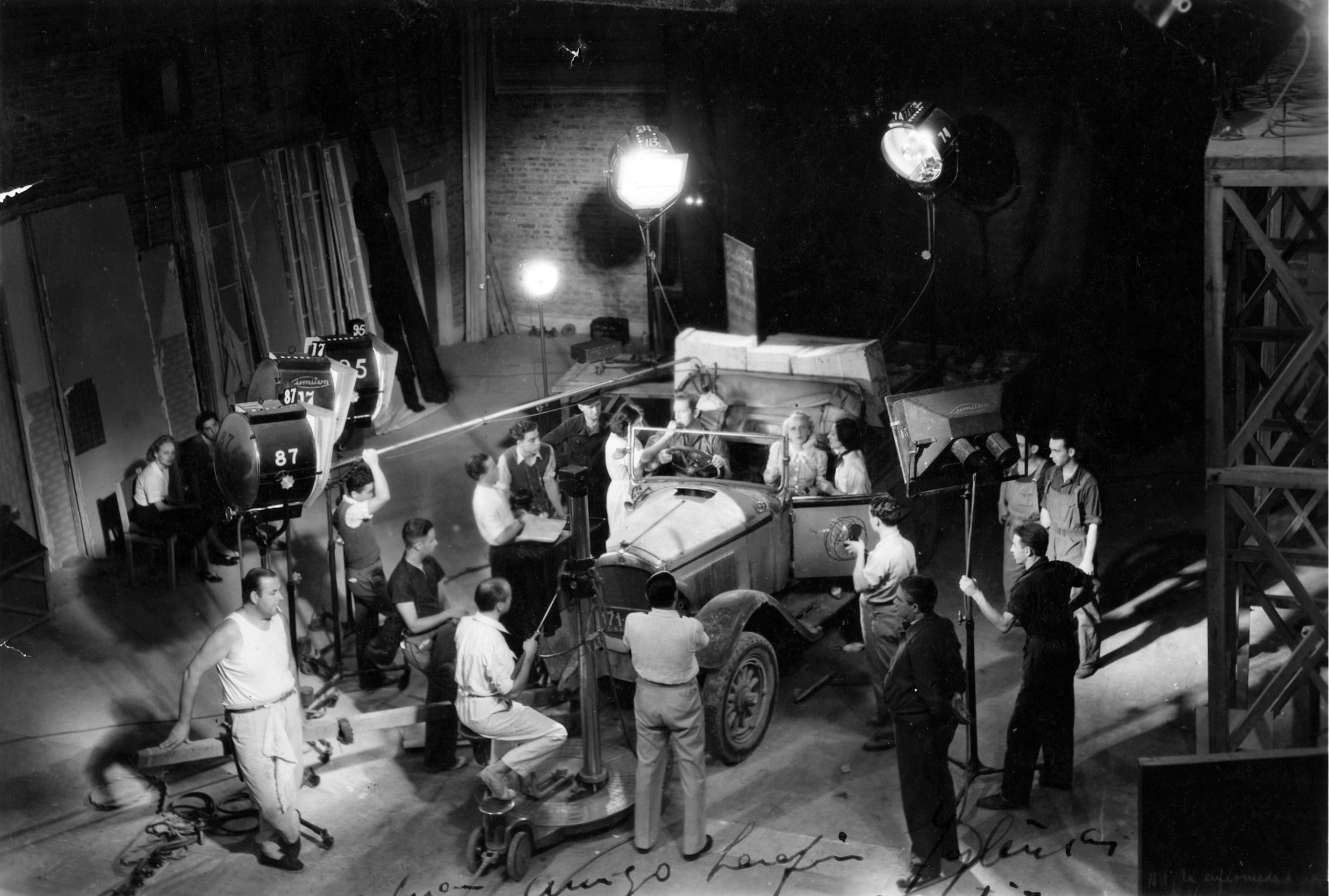
A view of the shooting of La rubia del camino, with Paulina Singerman and Fernando Borel in the car and Manuel Romero with his back to the camera.

La rubia del camino was made during a highly prolific period for Manuel Romero, who had made his debut as a director for the Lumiton production company in 1935 with Noches de Buenos Aires, with which he returned the studio to success at a moment of economic uncertainty, and soon became its principal filmmaker. Founded in 1933, Lumiton was, along with Argentina Sono Film, one of the first two sound-on-film studios in Latin America, for which it built pioneering shooting facilities in the town of Munro, Greater Buenos Aires. Both studios inaugurated the Golden Age of Argentine cinema, a period of rapid growth and consolidation of the local film industry following the arrival of sound film. Before entering cinema, Romero was already a well-known theatrical producer of the Buenoso Aires revue (revista porteña) and a lyricist of tangos, and he brought several stars and themes from those worlds into his films. He was known for the speed with which he shot and released his work, in the manner of American "quickies" and B movies, and made 30 films between 1935 and 1942. The opening of La rubia del camino was shot at the Llao Llao Hotel in Bariloche, which had recently opened in January 1938 to a design by the architect Alejandro Bustillo. That first building was completely destroyed by a fire in October the following year and was rebuilt in 1940, the version that survives today. As a result, La rubia del camino also serves as "an audiovisual record of that first hotel, which lasted such a short time". All the roads that Singerman's character travels by car throughout the film were shot using rear projection. The film was an example of Romero's characteristic speed: only twenty-eight days passed between the start of shooting and its premiere.

Fernando Borel, Paulina Singerman and Sabina Olmos in a scene from the film.

Romero is a complex figure to analyse from an auteur perspective, since he was a director driven by commercial rather than artistic ambitions, with a rudimentary use of film technique and a working method based on recurring actors and situations that he reworked and reversioned film after film. The style Romero developed sought to appeal to mass taste, depicting the urban popular culture of Buenos Aires and forms such as tango, the revista porteña and the sainete. Although specialist critics regarded his style as uncultured, it was hugely successful among the working-class audiences it was aimed at, and Romero became the most successful Argentine director of the 1930s. La rubia del camino belongs to the series of films in which Romero addressed the conflict between the upper class and the working class, identifying the former as villainous and foreign-oriented and the latter as a repository of morality and of what is authentically national. According to the historian Matthew B. Karush, Romero's films "construct a particular version of the Argentine nation, one that emphasizes conventional morality and conservative values like hard work but also contains a deeply populist message, insofar as it is premised on the exclusion of the rich". The researcher Alejandro Kelly Hopfenblatt notes that this opposition is also built through concrete formal choices: the bourgeois world is presented in wide shots that scatter the characters across the space and reinforce their individualism, while the popular classes appear in tighter shots, gathered around a table, underscoring the idea of community. The contrast is further reinforced through the music: the sequence of work and happiness alongside Julián is accompanied by "La marcha del camino"—with lyrics by Romero himself—giving the popular a national sound, while the upper class's life of consumption is associated with jazz, presented as foreign. Romero's films from this period have been considered a precedent for Peronist discourse because of their exaltation of the people against the elite.

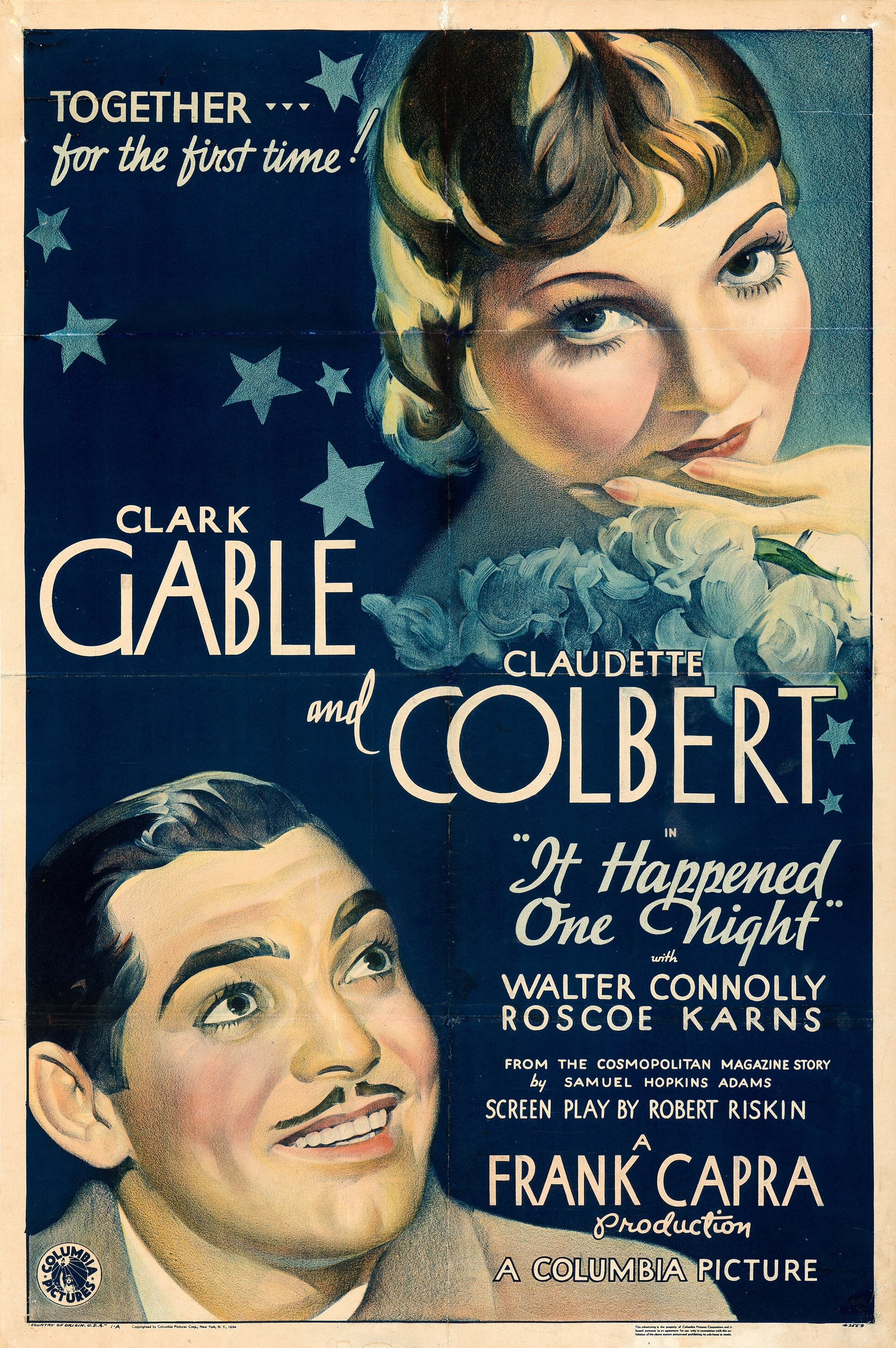
The American film It Happened One Night (1934), by Frank Capra, was the main inspiration for the film.

There is consensus among historians that La rubia del camino is based on the American film It Happened One Night (1934), by Frank Capra, one of the first screwball comedies. Like Capra's film, La rubia del camino is about a rich young woman who evades parental control, meets a man of a lower class, travels with him to the city and ends up falling in love. However, Romero's film is not simply a remake with Argentine details; it introduces a series of changes that set it apart from the original. According to Karush, it follows the melodrama conventions that prevailed in the Argentine mass culture of the time and widens the social differences between the protagonists still further: it replicates the depiction of class difference typical of Argentine melodrama—"the hateful rich and the noble poor"—but with the novelty of inverting the usual gender roles. Singerman's character is among the first active female characters with initiative in Argentine cinema, and represented the new archetype of the "modern girl" (Spanish: joven moderna), a global phenomenon of the interwar period: liberated women who drank, smoked and adopted a cosmopolitan attitude and a looser stance towards morality. Romero repeated the formula of La rubia del camino in Isabelita (1940) and Elvira Fernández, vendedora de tienda (1942), both starring Singerman in what would become her typecasting role: the spoiled millionairess who is transformed after becoming involved with the working class. Kelly Hopfenblatt argues, however, that these films progressively toned down the conflictive character of the class opposition towards a more conciliatory view, as part of a strain of "bourgeois comedy" that was taking hold in Argentine cinema in the early 1940s.

Singerman's persona has often led her films to be framed as an Argentine version of the American screwball comedy, although the genre's characteristic elements belong more to the character than to the structure of the film. Unlike Hollywood screwball, the formation of the cross-class couple does not amount to a "union of complementary opposites"; instead, Romero presents class difference as irreconcilable. Singerman's character must abandon her former life and even change her name for one that sounds less foreign. Her great transformation comes after she assists at a birth: there the values of femininity triumph over class differences, and the maternal instinct awakened in her leads her to adopt the poor's values of solidarity and to embrace Argentine identity. In Karush's words:

The reconciliation of Betty and Julian requires not only that she reject her elite urban lifestyle but also that she take on the subordinate feminine role in the couple. In this sense, the movie shares a common gender dynamic with Capra's film: in both, the capricious independent woman is eventually subordinated to the male. But in the melodramatic universe of the Argentine film, this gendered plot line reinforces the triumph of Argentine national identity over foreignness, of the rural over the urban, of the poor over the rich, as well as of tradition over modernity. Betty replaces her father with an even more traditional patriarch, one who presumably will be able to dominate her more effectively.

== Release and reception ==
La rubia del camino premiered on 6 April 1938 at the Cine Monumental in Buenos Aires. Writing for the magazine Ahora, Amelia Monti noted that at the premiere screening the "genuinely large" audience "broke into enthusiastic applause, spontaneously, which went on for several minutes". The newspaper La Prensa remarked that the film, "despite the slightness of its subject, holds the viewer's interest". For his part, the critic Calki of the newspaper El Mundo praised La rubia del camino as an "agile and well-made comedy" and wrote:

The film of surprises: a revelation, Paulina Singerman as a screen actress. A discovery, Fernando Borel, a vigorous new leading man, one hundred per cent cinema. And a rehabilitation: Manuel Romero as a writer, making a brilliant comedy with clean resources, good dialogue and pleasing humour. (...) It has everything a film ought to have: it entertains and amuses, without a single minute lacking in animation.

== Legacy ==
La rubia del camino is one of the most representative titles in Paulina Singerman's filmography and, in Kelly Hopfenblatt's words, a paradigmatic film for those who regard Romero as a "standard-bearer for the exaltation of the people and the denunciation of the ruling classes". Raúl Manrupe and María Alejandra Portela, in Un diccionario de films argentinos, wrote that the film shows "a good Romero moving comfortably in popular comedy". The critic Rodrigo Tarruella described it as the director's masterpiece and wrote:

The encounter between Paulina and the singing truck driver Fernando Borel achieves a heightened combination of sexual passion and class struggle worthy of D. H. Lawrence. If we set aside Singerman's resemblance to her models Katharine Hepburn–Ginger Rogers–Carole Lombard and the Noble Savage tone of Borel's descamisados, La rubia... is one of the rare moments of vital freedom in Argentine cinema and one of the few and fleeting ones in which Romero suspends his rhetoric of law, order, sacrifice and suffering, the four horsemen of the system to which he surrendered.

== See also ==
- List of Argentine films of 1938
- List of works by Manuel Romero

== Bibliography ==
- Di Núbila, Domingo (1998). La época de oro. Historia del cine argentino I (in Spanish). Buenos Aires: Ediciones del Jilguero. ISBN 978-987-957-865-0.
- Fabbro, Gabriela (2024). Lumiton. El sello que marcó el rumbo del cine nacional (in Spanish). Vicente López: Archivo Lumiton. ISBN 978-987-261-511-6.
- Karush, Matthew B. (2012). Culture of Class: Radio and Cinema in the Making of a Divided Argentina, 1920–1946. Durham: Duke University Press. ISBN 978-0-8223-5243-3 – via Internet Archive.
- Manrupe, Raúl; Portela, María Alejandra (2001). Un diccionario de films argentinos (1930-1995) (in Spanish). Buenos Aires: Corregidor. ISBN 950-05-0896-6 – via Internet Archive.
- Peña, Fernando Martín (2012). Cien años de cine argentino (eBook) (in Spanish). Buenos Aires: Editorial Biblos. ISBN 978-987-691-098-9.
- Schumann, Peter B. (1987). Historia del cine latinoamericano. Legasa. ISBN 978-9506000998.
- Tossounian, Cecilia (2019). La Joven Moderna in Interwar Argentina: Gender, Nation, and Popular Culture. University Press of Florida. ISBN 978-168-340-125-4 – via Google Books.
