= It Happened One Night =

1934 film by Frank Capra

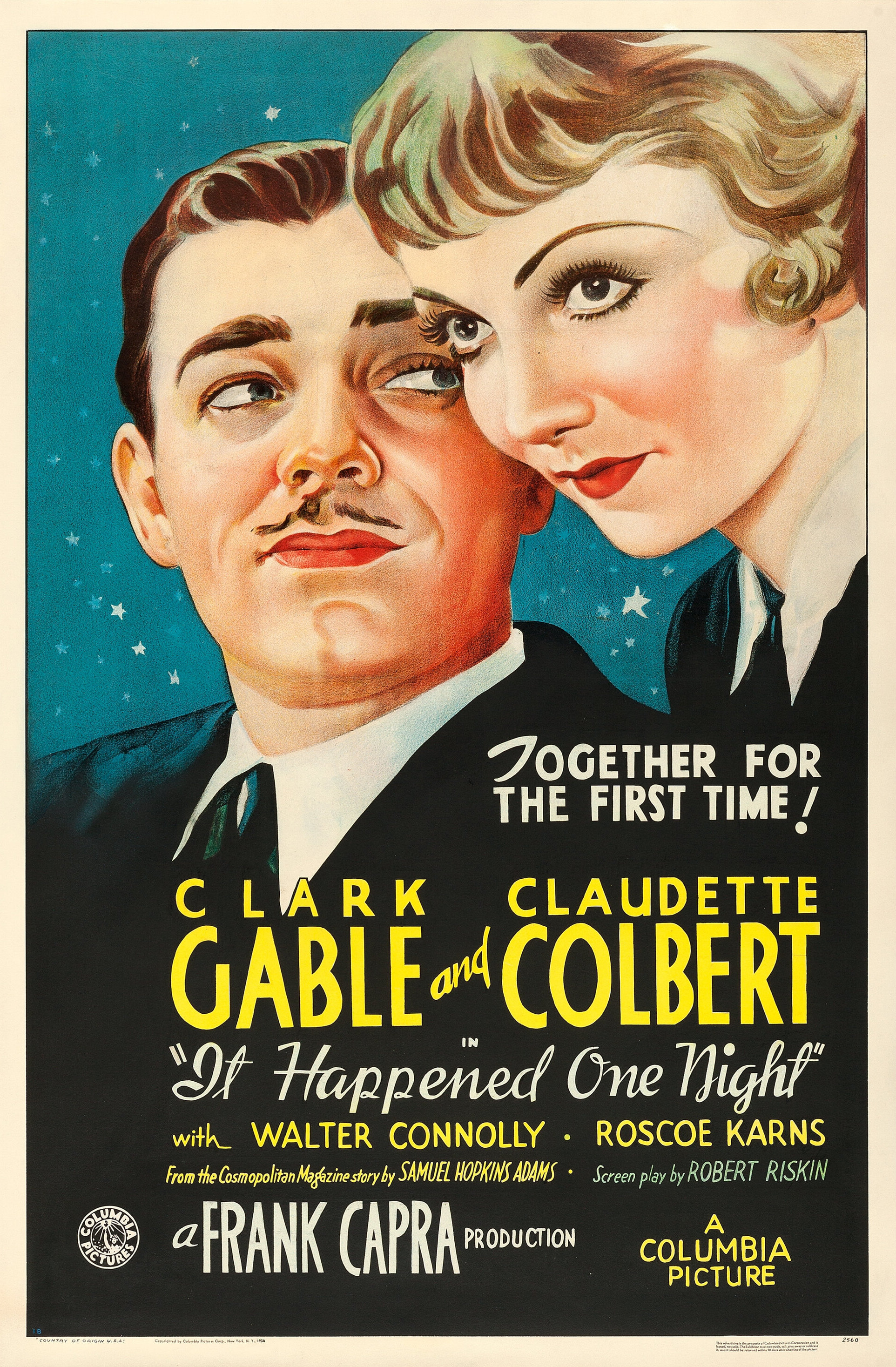
- Theatrical release poster
- Directed by: Frank Capra
- Screenplay by: Robert Riskin
- Based on: "Night Bus"; 1933 story in Cosmopolitan by Samuel Hopkins Adams
- Produced by: Frank Capra; Harry Cohn
- Starring: Clark Gable; Claudette Colbert
- Cinematography: Joseph Walker
- Edited by: Gene Havlick
- Music by: Howard Jackson; Louis Silvers
- Production company: Columbia Pictures
- Distributed by: Columbia Pictures
- Release date: February 22, 1934
- Running time: 105 minutes
- Country: United States
- Language: English
- Budget: $325,000 or $500,000
- Box office: $2.5 million (worldwide rentals)

The film's trailer

It Happened One Night is a 1934 American screwball comedy film produced and directed by Frank Capra. Claudette Colbert stars as a pampered socialite who tries to get out from under her father's thumb and falls in love with a roguish reporter, played by Clark Gable.

The screenplay by Robert Riskin is based on the August 1933 short story "Night Bus" by Samuel Hopkins Adams, which provided the shooting title. It is considered a "pre-Code" production, as it was released just four months before the Motion Picture Producers and Distributors of America began rigidly enforcing the Hays Code.

It was the first of only three films to win the "Big Five" Academy Awards: Best Picture, Best Director, Best Actor, Best Actress, and Best Adapted Screenplay.

In 1993, it was selected for preservation in the U.S. National Film Registry by the Library of Congress, being deemed "culturally, historically, or aesthetically significant". In 2013, the film underwent an extensive restoration by Sony Pictures.

== Plot ==
Wall Street heiress Ellie Andrews has eloped with glamorous pilot King Westley. Her father, who considers Westley a fortune hunter, sequesters Ellie on his Florida yacht while his lawyers arrange an annulment. Ellie escapes and swims to shore, where she boards a Greyhound bus bound for New York City to reunite with Westley. Mr. Andrews makes headlines by offering a $10,000 reward ($240,672 in 2025) for her safe return.

On the bus, Ellie meets Peter Warne, a newly unemployed newspaper reporter. Peter is annoyed by Ellie, who expects special treatment and lacks practical life skills. However, drawn to Ellie's strong personality, he helps her after a thief steals most of her money. During a scheduled stop in Jacksonville, Florida, Ellie misses the bus, wrongly assuming the driver would wait for her. Having read the headlines, Peter stays behind to accompany her, and they catch the evening bus that night.

On the evening bus, Ellie initially sits next to salesman Shapeley, who hits on her until Peter claims to be her husband. The bus is forced to stop for the night when a bridge washes out on the road, and Peter rents them a motel room together. He gives her an ultimatum: if she gives him an exclusive story, he will help her get to New York; otherwise, he will tell her father where she is. Ellie agrees to the story.

Peter strings up a blanket room divider between their respective beds, which he jokingly calls the "walls of Jericho". In the morning, Mr. Andrews' private detectives question Peter and Ellie, who evade them by pretending to be a married couple having a stormy argument.

On the next bus, Shapeley recognizes Ellie from a newspaper and offers to split the reward with Peter. Pretending to be a gang member kidnapping Ellie for a higher ransom, Peter scares off Shapeley, who runs off. Worried Shapeley will report their location to Ellie's father, Peter insists they leave the bus and go on foot.

The next morning, Peter and Ellie hitchhike. Though they argue about Ellie's privilege and Peter's cockiness, they begin to fall in love. While Peter's technique fails to hail a series of cars, Ellie succeeds on her first attempt by displaying her leg. The driver who stops is a highwayman who drives away with their luggage. Peter chases him down and steals his car, enabling them to continue their journey.

At a New Jersey motel, Ellie confesses her love to Peter, who is moved but rebuffs her because he considers himself unworthy as long as he remains unemployed. Early next morning, while Ellie sleeps, Peter drives to New York to sell his story to his former newspaper for $1,000 ($25,700 in 2026). Seeing Peter drive away, the motel owners conclude Ellie is a deadbeat and evict her. Believing Peter has deserted her, Ellie calls her father to take her home. On their way back, their motorcade passes Peter, who realizes he is too late.

Shortly before a second, formal wedding ceremony with Westley, Ellie confesses to her father her love for Peter. After Peter reaches out to Mr. Andrews about a "financial" matter, which Ellie assumes is the $10,000 reward, she resolves to marry Westley anyway. Rather than claim the reward, Peter asks Mr. Andrews to reimburse him for his expenses from the trip, which total $39.60 (equivalent to $953 in 2025). Impressed by Peter's honesty, Mr. Andrews asks whether Peter loves Ellie; after dodging the question several times, Peter admits he loves her.

While walking Ellie down the aisle, Mr. Andrews reveals Peter's full story. He expresses his approval of Peter and urges that if Ellie changes her mind, he will help her escape the wedding and pay Westley to go away. Dumping Westley at the altar, Ellie seeks out Peter.

As Mr. Andrews predicted, Westley agrees to an annulment for $100,000 ($2.4 million in 2026). Anxiously waiting for the annulment to go through, Peter telegrams Mr. Andrews that "the walls of Jericho are toppling"; Mr. Andrews confirms that Peter can "let 'em topple". At the honeymooners' motel, a trumpet plays, and a blanket falls to the floor in the couple's cabin, after which the lights go out.

== Cast ==
- Clark Gable as Peter Warne
- Claudette Colbert as Ellen "Ellie" Andrews
- Walter Connolly as Alexander Andrews
- Roscoe Karns as Oscar Shapeley, an annoying bus passenger who tries to pick up Ellie
- Jameson Thomas as "King" Westley
- Alan Hale as Danker, a singing car driver who wants to steal a suitcase
- Arthur Hoyt as Zeke, a motel owner
- Blanche Friderici as Zeke's wife
- Charles C. Wilson as Joe Gordon, newspaper editor and Peter's boss

Uncredited cast

- Ernie Adams as the bag thief
- Irving Bacon as a gas station attendant
- George Breakston as a boy bus passenger whose mother collapses
- Ward Bond as bus driver #1
- Eddy Chandler as bus driver #2
- Mickey Daniels as a vendor on the bus
- Bess Flowers as Agnes, Gordon's secretary
- Harry Holman as the auto camp manager at the end of the film
- Claire McDowell as the collapsed mother in the bus
- Harry Todd as the flagman at railroad crossing
- Maidel Turner as the auto camp manager's wife
- Wallis Clark as Lovington
- Frank Yaconelli as Tony
- Dolores Fuller as a child
- Ken Carson as a guitar player on the bus

== Production ==
=== Casting ===
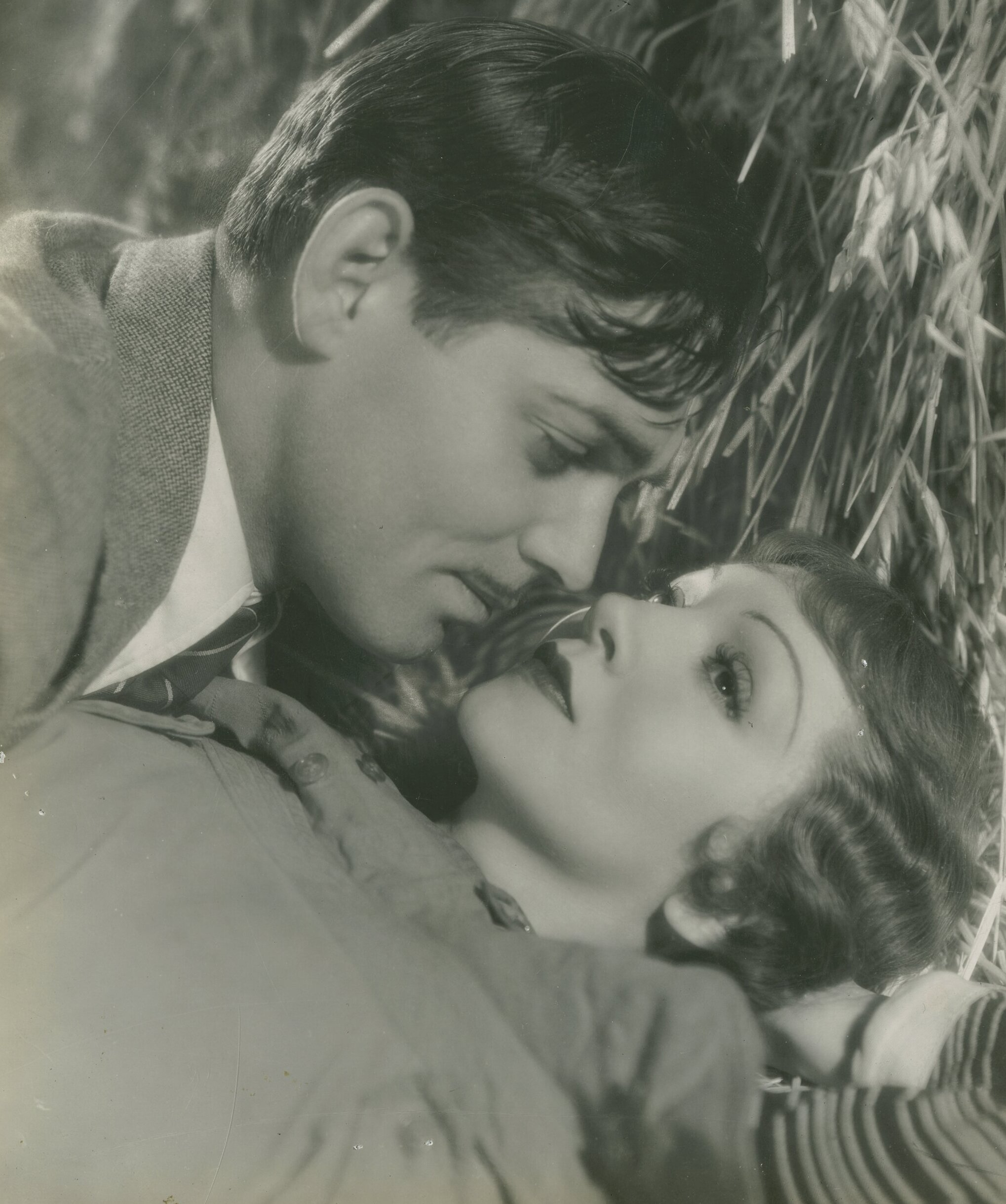
Gable and Colbert in a production still

Neither Gable nor Colbert was the first choice to play the lead roles. Miriam Hopkins rejected the part of Ellie. Robert Montgomery and Myrna Loy were then offered the roles, but both turned down the script. Loy later noted that the final story as filmed bore little resemblance to the script that she and Montgomery had been given. Margaret Sullavan also rejected the part. Constance Bennett was willing to accept the role if she could produce the film herself but Columbia Pictures would not agree to that condition. Bette Davis then wanted the role but she was under contract with Warner Brothers and Jack L. Warner refused to lend her. Carole Lombard was unable to accept because Columbia's proposed filming schedule would conflict with her work on Bolero at Paramount. Loretta Young also turned it down.

Harry Cohn suggested Colbert, who initially turned down the role. Her first film, For the Love of Mike (1927), had been directed by Capra and was such a disaster that neither wanted to work with the other again. Later, she agreed to the role only if her salary was doubled to $50,000 and if her scenes were completed in four weeks so that she could take a planned vacation.

According to Hollywood legend, Gable was lent to Columbia Pictures, then considered a minor studio, as punishment for refusing a role at his own studio. That tale has been partially refuted by more recent biographies. Metro-Goldwyn-Mayer did not have a project ready for Gable and the studio was paying him his contracted salary of $2,000 per week whether he worked or not. Louis B. Mayer lent him to Columbia for $2,500 per week, hence netting MGM $500 per week while he was gone. Capra, however, insisted that Gable was a reluctant participant in the film.

=== Filming ===
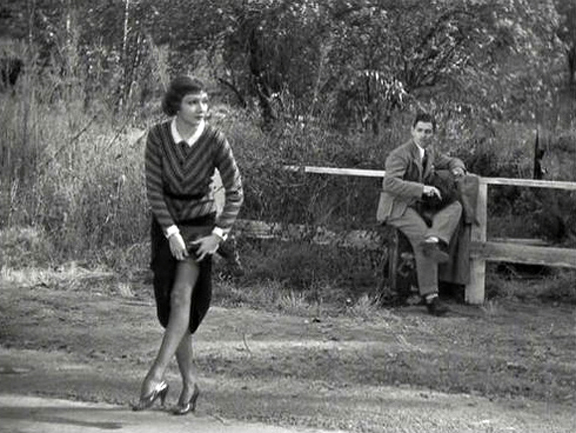
The hitchhiking scene

Filming began in a tense atmosphere, as Gable and Colbert were dissatisfied with the script. Capra understood their dissatisfaction and let screenwriter Robert Riskin rewrite it. Colbert continued to show her displeasure on the set. She also initially balked at pulling up her skirt to entice a passing driver to provide a ride, complaining that it was unladylike. Upon seeing the chorus girl who was brought in as her body double, an outraged Colbert told the director, "Get her out of here. I'll do it. That's not my leg!" Capra claimed that Colbert "had many little tantrums, motivated by her antipathy toward me," but "was wonderful in the part." Part of the film was made on Thousand Oaks Boulevard in Thousand Oaks, California.

== Reception ==
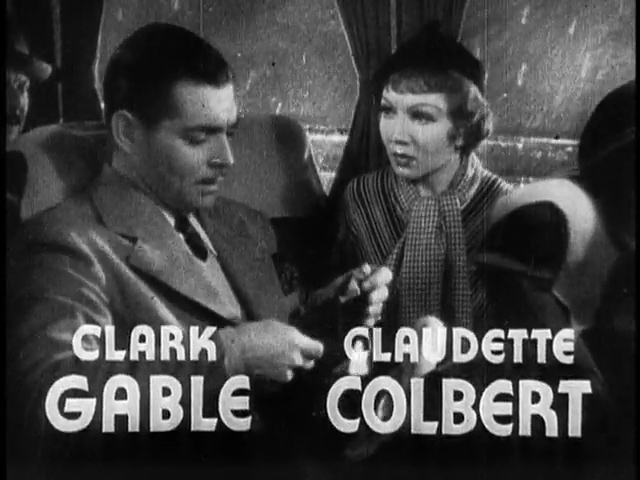
Frame from the film's trailer

Columbia appeared to have low expectations for the film and did not mount much of an advertising campaign for it.

The film premiered at Radio City Music Hall. Initial reviews were generally positive. Mordaunt Hall of The New York Times called it "a good piece of fiction, which, with all its feverish stunts, is blessed with bright dialogue and a good quota of relatively restrained scenes". Hall described Colbert's performance as "engaging and lively" and Gable as "excellent". Variety reported that it was "without a particularly strong plot" but "manages to come through in a big way, due to the acting, dialog, situations and directing". Film Daily praised it as "a lively yarn, fast-moving, plenty humorous, racy enough to be tantalizing, and yet perfectly decorous". The New York Herald Tribune called it "lively and amusing".

John Mosher of The New Yorker panned it as "pretty much nonsense and quite dreary", which was probably the review Capra had in mind when he recalled in his autobiography that "sophisticated" critics had dismissed the film. Despite the positive reviews, the film was only moderately successful in its initial run. After it was released to secondary movie houses, ticket sales became brisk, especially in smaller towns where the film's characters and simple romance struck a chord with moviegoers who were not surrounded by luxury. It turned out to be a major box office smash, easily Columbia's biggest hit at least until the late 1980s. During its initial release, the film earned $1 million in theater rentals from the United States and Canada.

Rotten Tomatoes compiled 108 reviews of the film to form a 98% score and an average rating of 9.1/10. The consensus reads, "Capturing its stars and director at their finest, It Happened One Night remains unsurpassed by the countless romantic comedies it has inspired". The film holds a score of 87 out of 100 on Metacritic, based on 16 critics.

Colbert was nominated for an Academy Award, but decided not to attend the ceremony since she felt she had "just finished the worst picture in the world", and planned to take a cross-country railroad trip. After she was named the winner, studio chief Harry Cohn sent someone to "drag her off" the train, which had not yet departed, to bring her to the ceremony. Colbert arrived wearing a two-piece traveling suit.

=== Academy Awards ===
The film won all five of the Academy Awards for which it was nominated at the 7th Academy Awards for 1934:

| Award | Result | Winner |
|---|---|---|
| Outstanding Production | Won | Frank Capra and Harry Cohn (for Columbia Pictures) |
| Best Director | Won | Frank Capra |
| Best Actor | Won | Clark Gable |
| Best Actress | Won | Claudette Colbert |
| Best Adaptation | Won | Robert Riskin |

It Happened One Night was the first film to win the "Big Five" Academy Awards (Best Picture, Best Director, Best Actor, Best Actress, and Best Writing). As of 2025, only two films have matched this feat: One Flew Over the Cuckoo's Nest in 1975 and The Silence of the Lambs in 1991. In 2006, Writers Guild of America West ranked its screenplay 59th in WGA's list of 101 Greatest Screenplays.

On December 15, 1996, Gable's Oscar was auctioned off for $607,500 to Steven Spielberg, who donated the statuette to the Motion Picture Academy. In June of the following year, Colbert's Oscar was offered for auction by Christie's but attracted no bids.

=== Others ===
The film was included in the following American Film Institute lists:

- 1998: AFI's 100 Years...100 Movies – #35
- 2000: AFI's 100 Years...100 Laughs – #8
- 2002: AFI's 100 Years...100 Passions – #38
- 2007: AFI's 100 Years...100 Movies (10th Anniversary Edition) – #46
- 2008: AFI's 10 Top 10: Romantic Comedy – #3

== Influence ==
It Happened One Night made an immediate impact on the public. In one scene, Gable undresses for bed, taking off his shirt to reveal that he is bare-chested. An urban legend claims that, as a result, sales of men's undershirts declined noticeably. The film also prominently features a Greyhound bus in the story, spurring interest in bus travel nationwide.

The unpublished memoirs of animator Friz Freleng mention that this was one of his favorite films. It Happened One Night has several parallels with, and may have inspired, aspects of the cartoon character Bugs Bunny, who made his first appearance six years later, and whom Freleng helped develop. In the film, a minor character, Oscar Shapely, continually calls the Gable character "Doc"; an imaginary character named "Bugs Dooley" is mentioned once in order to frighten Shapely; and there is also a scene in which Gable eats carrots while talking quickly with his mouth full, as Bugs does. The film would thus be indirectly responsible for the widespread association of rabbits with carrots, which originated from the character of Bugs Bunny.

== Restoration ==
In 2013 It Happened One Night was digitally restored. A new wet-gate master was produced by Sony Colorworks for scanning at 4K. The images were digitally treated at Prasad Corporation to remove dirt, tears, scratches, and other artifacts. Care was taken to preserve the original look of the film.

== Remakes and adaptations ==
The film has inspired a number of remakes, including the musicals Eve Knew Her Apples (1945) starring Ann Miller, and You Can't Run Away from It (1956) starring June Allyson and Jack Lemmon, which was directed and produced by Dick Powell.

It Happened One Night was adapted as a one-hour radio play on the March 20, 1939, broadcast of Lux Radio Theatre, with Colbert and Gable reprising their roles. The screenplay was also adapted as a radio play for the January 28, 1940, broadcast of The Campbell Playhouse, starring Orson Welles (Mr. Andrews), William Powell (Peter Warne) and Miriam Hopkins (Ellie Andrews).

It Happened One Night served as the main inspiration for the 1938 Argentine film La rubia del camino, written and directed by Manuel Romero for the studio Lumiton. A popular title of the Golden Age of Argentine cinema, it established a formula that Romero would repeat in the subsequent films Isabelita (1940) and Elvira Fernández, vendedora de tiendas (1942).

It Happened One Night has been adapted into numerous Indian films. These include five Hindi adaptations: Nadaan (1951), Chori Chori (1956), Nau Do Gyarah (1957), Basant (1960) and Dil Hai Ke Manta Nahin (1991), one Bengali adaptation Chaoa Paoa (1959), two Tamil adaptations: Chandrodayam (1966) and Kadhal Rojavae (2000), and one Kannada adaptation Hudugaata (2007).

== In popular culture ==
The 1937 Laurel and Hardy comedy Way Out West parodied the famous hitchhiking scene with Stan Laurel managing to stop a stage coach using the same technique. A Life Less Ordinary (1997) by Danny Boyle has a plot that shares similarities with It Happened One Night and clearly references the movie in its own hitchhiking scene.

Mel Brooks's film Spaceballs (1987) parodies the wedding scene. As she walks down the aisle to wed Prince Valium, Princess Vespa (Daphne Zuniga) is told by King Roland (Dick Van Patten) that Lone Starr (Bill Pullman) forsook the reward for the princess's return and only asked to be reimbursed for the cost of the trip.

Other films have used familiar plot points from It Happened One Night. In Bandits (2001), Joe Blake (Bruce Willis) erects a blanket partition between motel room beds out of respect for Kate Wheeler's (Cate Blanchett's) privacy. He remarks that he saw people do the same thing in an old movie.

It Happened One Night has been cited as an influence on several other films. Films that have been compared to the picture for their similar premises include Love on the Run (1936), The Bride Came C.O.D. (1941), A Lady Takes a Chance (1943), Roman Holiday (1953), The Sure Thing (1985), Spaceballs (1987), Runaway Bride (1999), Forces of Nature (1999), and Leap Year (2010).

== See also ==
- List of Academy Award records
- List of Big Five Academy Award winners and nominees

Awards
| Preceded by First film to achieve this | "Big Five" Academy Award winner | Succeeded by One Flew Over the Cuckoo's Nest |
| Preceded by First film to achieve this | Academy Award winner for Best Actor and Best Actress | Succeeded by One Flew Over the Cuckoo's Nest |
