= Elvira Fernández, vendedora de tiendas =

- Theatrical poster
- Directed by: Manuel Romero
- Written by: Manuel Romero
- Cinematography: Alberto Etchebehere
- Edited by: Jorge Gárate
- Music by: Rodolfo Sciammarella, Alberto Soifer
- Production company: Artistas Directores y Productores Argentinos Asociado
- Release date: 1 July 1942
- Running time: 91 minutes
- Country: Argentina
- Language: Spanish

Elvira Fernández, vendedora de tiendas is a 1942 Argentine comedy film directed by Manuel Romero during the Golden Age of Argentine cinema. It stars Paulina Singerman, Juan Carlos Thorry, Tito Lusiardo and Sofía Bozán. The film is about the daughter of a millionaire store owner, who organizes a worker strike.

== Plot ==
Paulina, the daughter of the millionaire owner of a store, becomes employed at the store under an assumed name. She investigates the injustices of the workers and leads a strike, forcing her father and the store operators to bring about improvements in working conditions.

== Cast ==
- Paulina Singerman
- Juan Carlos Thorry
- Tito Lusiardo
- Sofía Bozán
- Enrique Roldán
- Carmen del Moral
- Elena Lucena
- Alberto Terrones
- Juan Mangiante
- Julio Renato
- Salvador Sinaí
- Miguel Di Carlo
- Oscar Savino
- Juan Gamboa
- Fernando Campos

== Themes ==
The film has been compared to other film of the period including Mujeres que trabajan (1938), La rubia del camino (1938), Isabelita (1940), sharing the common theme of "a spoiled young woman [who] learns both the value of hard work and the capacity to care for others under the tutelage of working class characters". Central to the film is the union protest, which has been described as being "quite complex", "summarized in a sequence quite clearly through a series of images [with] passionate speakers". The speech where Elvira Fernandez anticipates selling her store involuntarily was later used in propaganda films of Peron.

== Reception ==
The El Heraldo del Cinematografista wrote that it "excellently managed the strike movement ... There are effective comic passages throughout the film", while La Nación praised the cinematography. Raúl Manrupe and María Alejandra Portela in their book Un diccionario de films argentinos (1930-1995) wrote: "...a social issue in the service of comedy. Another one of Romero's vehicles for Singerman, it would be interesting to rediscover how he crosses fun with reality."

== See also ==
- List of works by Manuel Romero
