= The Clover Sect =

- Directed by: Mario Soffici
- Written by: Tulio Demicheli; José Ramón Luna
- Starring: Pedro López Lagar; Santiago Gómez Cou; Amelita Vargas; Pascual Nacaratti; Alberto Terrones
- Cinematography: Mario Pagés
- Music by: Alejandro Gutierrez del Barrio
- Production company: Estudios San Miguel
- Release date: 21 July 1948
- Running time: 78 minutes
- Country: Argentina
- Language: Spanish

The Clover Sect (Spanish: La Secta del trébol) is a 1948 Argentine comedy film of the classical era of Argentine cinema, directed by Mario Soffici and written by Tulio Demicheli and José Ramón Luna. It premiered on July 21st, 1948.

The film is about a writer who gets involved in a police case related to some jewelry belonging to a Chinese sect.

== Cast ==
- Pedro López Lagar
- Santiago Gómez Cou
- Amelia Vargas
- Pascual Nacaratti
- Alberto Terrones
- José Ruzzo
- Néstor Deval
- María Cristina
- Blanca del Prado
- Cayetano Biondo
- Adolfo Linvel
- Mario Baroffio
- Reynaldo Mompel
- Juan Pecci
- Martha Atoche
- Fernando Labat
