= El retrato =

El Retrato
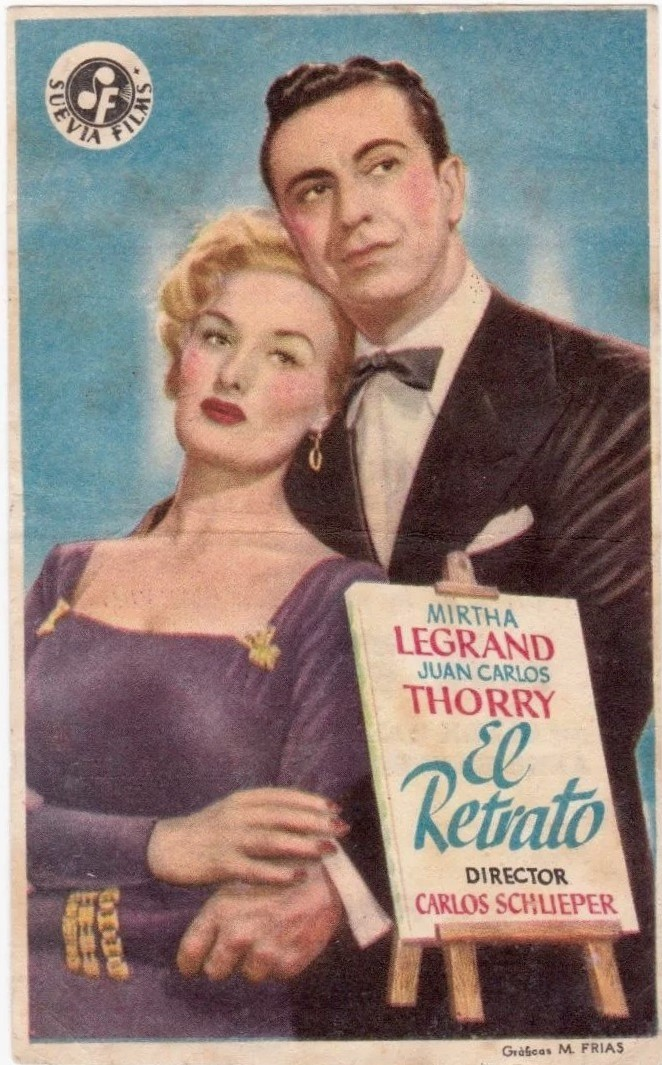
- Release date: 1947
- Country: Argentina
- Language: Spanish

El Retrato is a 1947 Argentine comedy film of the classical era of Argentine cinema, directed by Carlos Schlieper, written by Alejandro Verbitsky and Emilio Villalba Welsh, and starring Alberto de Mendoza, Mirtha Legrand, Osvaldo Miranda and Juan Carlos Thorry.

== Cast ==
- Mirtha Legrand
- Francisco Barletta
- Héctor Calcaño
- Alberto de Mendoza
- Carlos Enríquez
- Mario Faig
- Aurelia Ferrer
- Alberto Bello
- Osvaldo Miranda
- Horacio O'Connor
- Sara Olmos
- Santiago Rebull
- María Santos
- Alberto Terrones
- Juan Carlos Thorry
