= Mateo (1937 film) =

- Film poster
- Directed by: Daniel Tinayre, Antonio Lanfranco (assistant)
- Written by: Armando Discépolo (play); Daniel Tinayre
- Produced by: Eduardo Bedoya
- Starring: Luis Arata
- Cinematography: Gerhard Huttula
- Edited by: Carlos Lemos
- Music by: Enrique Santos Discépolo and José Vázquez Vigo
- Production company: Estudios Baires
- Release date: 1937
- Running time: 74 minutes
- Country: Argentina
- Language: Spanish

Mateo is a 1937 Argentine crime drama film of the Golden Age of Argentine cinema directed by Daniel Tinayre, which he adapted from the play by Armando Discépolo. Starring Luis Arata, Enrique Santos Discépolo, José Gola and Alita Román, it was the first successful film of Tinayre's.

== Plot ==
An old carriage-driver who is rendered jobless by cars and progress is so desperate that he becomes a gangster. But when his own son starts a life of crime, he repents and gives himself to the authorities, setting an example for his family and especially for his son.

== Cast ==
- Luis Arata as Mateo
- Enrique Santos Discépolo
- José Gola
- Alita Román
- Oscar Casanovas
- Tony D'Algy
- Paquita Vehil
- Arturo Arcari
- Antonio Capuano
- Ada Cornaro
- René Cossa
- Antonio Medoya
- Arturo Palito

== Production ==
Domingo Di Núbila says that Armando Discépolo's play was his workhorse, which the public never tired of seeing. An unusual combination of circumstances favored its filming. Natalio Félix Botana founded the Baires Studios and backed Tinayre's project, and although the adaptation was entrusted to Armando Discépolo himself, his brother Enrique, Homero Manzi and director Tinayre were also involved. For the filming, part of Lumiton's studios were rented while Botana built his own galleries.

Botana's financial capacity made it possible to hire a large cast, including Oscar Casanovas, an Olympic boxing champion who played the youngest son, and the Spanish actor Tony D'Algy as the daughter's boyfriend. The score was composed by Enrique Santos Discépolo with orchestration by José Vázquez Vigo. Ricardo Conord was responsible for the film's art direction.

== Reception ==
Di Núbila wrote about the film:

"Mateo was not an easy pill to swallow in cinema because of its accumulation of depressing facts, fatalistic dialogues and terminal atmosphere, scarcely compensated by happy moments of the young people. But Arata's rapport with his character, Gola's strength and the images of Gerardo Húttula, who had been sent from Berlin to film the activities of German companies in Argentina, pulled it through. Familiar with expressionism, its concepts and techniques, he gave Mateo a style and effects unheard of in Argentine cinema, which were accentuated by Tinayre's concerns in the handling of the cameras. On the other hand, it was the first public success of this director".
