= Dormal =

Dormal is a surname. Notable people with the surname include:

- Julio Dormal (1846–1924), Belgian architect
- Mary Dormal, Argentine actress
