= Mary Dormal =

Argentinian actress

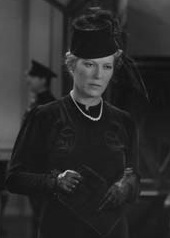
- Occupation: Actress

Mary Dormal (?–?) was an Argentine actress and vedette of the 1930s. She was one of the notable performers of the golden decade (1938–1948). Dormal worked with the director Manuel Romero, and with the film actors, Paulina Singerman, Enrique Serrano, and Niní Marshall. In theater, she appeared with Camila Quiroga, Norma Castillo, Nelida Quiroga, Mangacha Gutierrez, Arrieta Rosita Blanca Vidal, Dora Dolly, and Carmen Castex. Dorman was born in Buenos Aires and died there as well.

== Filmography ==
- 1938: La rubia del camino
- 1938: La chismosa
- 1939: Mandinga en la sierra
- 1939: Divorcio en Montevideo
- 1939: Muchachas que estudian
- 1939: Chimbela
- 1939: La pícara mentirosa
- 1940: El solterón
- 1940: Isabelita
- 1942: La novia de primavera
- 1943: Juvenilla
- 1948: Porteña de corazón
