= Alberto Terrones =

Argentine actor (1894–1957)

Alberto Terrones (Spanish pronunciation: [alˈβeɾto teˈrones]; 1894–1957) was an Argentine film and theater actor, with an extensive filmography.

== Filmography ==
- Mercado de abasto (1955)
- Misión extravagante (1954)
- Barrio gris (1954)
- Una ventana a la vida (1953)
- Misión en Buenos Aires (1952)
- The Beautiful Brummel (1951)
- El último payador (1950)
- Mary tuvo la culpa (1950)
- Avivato (1949)
- Al marido hay que seguirlo (1948)
- Don Bildigerno de Pago Milagro (1948)
- Novio, marido y amante (1948)
- La Secta del trébol (1948)
- El que recibe las bofetadas (1947)
- El retrato (1947)
- Viaje sin regreso (1946)
- Un modelo de París (1946)
- María Celeste (1945)
- The Corpse Breaks a Date (1944)
- Los dos rivales (1944)
- Su esposa diurna (1944)
- His Best Student (1944)
- La piel de zapa (1943)
- Eclipse de sol (1943)
- Pasión imposible (1943)
- La suerte llama tres veces (1943)
- Los hijos artificiales (1943)
- Mar del Plata ida y vuelta (1942)
- Ceniza al viento (1942)
- Ven... mi corazón te llama (1942)
- El Gran secreto (1942)
- Elvira Fernández, vendedora de tiendas (1942)
- Una novia en apuros (1942)
- Bruma en el Riachuelo (1942)
- Vidas marcadas (1942)
- Story of a Poor Young Man (1942)
- Mother Gloria (1941)
- Persona honrada se necesita (1941)
- When the Heart Sings (1941)
- El mejor papá del mundo (1941)
- La quinta calumnia (1941)
- Último refugio (1941)
- Yo hablo... (1940)
- La carga de los valientes (1940)
- Caprichosa y millonaria (1940)
- Encadenado (1940)
- Corazón de turco (1940)
- Sinvergüenza (1940)
- El grito de la juventud (1939)
- Muchachas que estudian (1939)
- The Life of Carlos Gardel (1939)
- Retazo (1939)
- La modelo y la estrella (1939)
- La vida es un tango (1939)
- El gran camarada (1939)
- El viejo doctor (1939)
- Atorrante (La venganza de la tierra) (1939)
- Nativa (1939)
- Honeysuckle (1938)
- Kilómetro 111 (1938)
- Nace un amor (1938)
- Con las alas rotas (1938)
- La rubia del camino (1938)
- El escuadrón azul (1938)
- El gran camarada (1938)
