= Nello Melli =

- Born: 1923; Buenos Aires, Argentina
- Died: 1986 (aged 62–63)
- Occupation: Editor
- Years active: 1941-1985

Nello Melli (1923–1986) was an Argentine film editor.

== Selected filmography ==
- You Are My Love (1941)
- White Eagle (1941)
- The Yacht Isabel Arrived This Afternoon (1949)
- Emergency Ward (1952)
- The ABC of Love (1967)

== Bibliography ==
- Rist, Peter H. Historical Dictionary of South American Cinema. Rowman & Littlefield, 2014.
