= Four Hearts (1939 film) =

Cuatro corazones
- Directed by: Carlos Schlieper
- Written by: Miguel Gómez Bao, Enrique Santos Discépolo
- Produced by: Carlos Schlieper
- Cinematography: Gumer Barreiros
- Edited by: Daniel Spósito
- Music by: José Vázquez Vigo
- Release date: 1 March 1939
- Running time: 80 minutes
- Country: Argentina
- Language: Spanish

Cuatro corazones is a 1939 Argentine musical drama film of the Golden Age of Argentine cinema, and the debut feature film of director Carlos Schlieper. It stars Enrique Santos Discépolo, Gloria Guzmán and Irma Córdoba.

== Cast ==
- Enrique Santos Discépolo
- Gloria Guzmán
- Irma Córdoba
- Alberto Vila
- Eduardo Sandrini
- Herminia Franco
- Tania
- Casimiro Ros
- Delia Martínez
- Salvador Arcella
- Osvaldo Chamot
- Jorge Alcaraz
- Ignacio de Soroa
- Adrián Cuneo
- Juan Casella
