= Caprichosa y millonaria =

- Directed by: Enrique Santos Discépolo
- Written by: Enrique Santos Discépolo
- Produced by: Sociedad Impresora de Discos Eletrofónicos
- Starring: Paulina Singerman; Fernando Borel; Tania; Augusto Codecá
- Music by: José Vázquez Vigo
- Release date: 1 May 1940
- Running time: 101 minutes
- Country: Argentina
- Language: Spanish

Caprichosa y millonaria (English: Capricious and millionaire) is a 1940 Argentine comedy film of the Golden Age of Argentine cinema, directed and written by Enrique Santos Discépolo. It was released on May 1, 1940.

== Cast ==
- Paulina Singerman
- Fernando Borel
- Tania
- Augusto Codecá
- Adolfo Meyer
- Inés Edmonson
- Eduardo Sandrini
- Antonio Ber Ciani
- Raúl Valdez (actor)
- Nacho Rosseti
- Alberto Terrones
- Aurelia Musto
- Salvador Arcella
- Isabel Luciano
- Lola Henderson
- Teresita Padrón
- Tota Martínez
- Emilia González
- Elvira Soubrevie
- Arnoldo Chamot
- María Arrieta
- José Vitori
- Fernando Caprio
- Barry Moral
- Carlos Moral
- Betty Blain
- Víctor Debari
- Salvador Sinaí
