= Rhythm, Love and Mischief =

Ritmo, amor y picardía
- Film poster
- Directed by: Enrique Carreras
- Written by: Manuel Barberá
- Starring: Alberto Castillo, Amelita Vargas, Alfredo Barbieri and Francisco Álvarez
- Cinematography: Alfredo Traverso
- Edited by: José Gallego
- Music by: Vlady
- Production company: Productora General Belgrano
- Distributed by: Productora General Belgrano
- Release date: March 2, 1955
- Running time: 80 minutes
- Country: Argentina
- Language: Spanish

Rhythm, Love and Mischief (Ritmo, amor y picardía) is a 1955 Argentine tango comedy film of the classical era of Argentine cinema, directed by Enrique Carreras and written by Manuel Barberá. It stars Alberto Castillo, Amelita Vargas, Alfredo Barbieri and Francisco Álvarez and was released on 2 March 1958.

== Plot ==
A cantankerous father changes his character when a young man who marries one of his daughters revolutionises the household.

== Cast ==
- Alberto Castillo as Raúl Sierra
- Amelita Vargas as Margarita
- Alfredo Barbieri as Javier
- Francisco Álvarez as Don Fermín Romero
- María Luisa Santés as Doña Mercedes
- Adrianita as Martha
- Pola Neuman as Ramona
- Lilian Valmar as Elvira
- Sandra Verani as Paca
- Héctor Armendáriz as Bernardo

== Reception ==
La Nación' considered the film (translated from Spanish) "very funny, of spontaneous grace in dialogue and action.". Raúl Manrupe and María Alejandra Portela in their book Un diccionario de films argentinos (1930–1995) wrote: "Comedy quite agile with good work by Alberto Castillo."
