= Francisco Audenino =

Argentine actor (d. 1964)

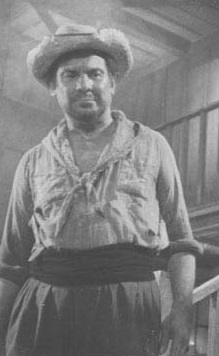
- Audenino in 1953
- Died: 1964
- Occupation: Actor
- Years active: 1935–1961 (film)

Francisco Audenino (died 1964) was an Argentine film actor of the Golden Age of Argentine cinema who appeared in around fifty productions, generally in supporting roles.

== Selected filmography ==
- Our Land of Peace (1939)
- Un bebé de París (1941)
- The Three Rats (1946)
- Dance of Fire (1949)
- Valentina (1950)
- Dark River (1952)
- The Count of Monte Cristo (1953)
- Behind a Long Wall (1958)

== Bibliography ==
- Borrás, Eduardo. Las aguas bajan turbias. Editorial Biblos, 2006.
