= Mario Passano =

Argentine film actor (1925–1995)

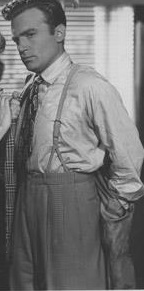
- Mario Passano (1951)
- Born: 1925; Buenos Aires, Argentina
- Died: 23 July 1995 (aged 69–70); Ituzaingó, Buenos Aires, Argentina
- Years active: 1951-1979

Mario Passano (1925 - 23 July 1995) was an Argentine film actor and tango performer.

He starred in some 20 films between 1951 and the late 1970s. In 1972 he starred in Autocine mon amour.

He was the brother of the actor Ricardo Passano and uncle of the actor Ricardo Passano Jr.

He died of a heart attack in Ituzaingó on 23 July 1995. He was buried at the Panteón Asociación Argentina de Actores, nicho#380, Cementerio de la Chacarita.

== Selected filmography ==
- The Fan (1951)
- Los Isleros (1951)
- The Black Market (1953)
- El Último perro (1956)
- Behind a Long Wall (1958)
- The Escaped (1964)
