= Novio, marido y amante =

- Directed by: Mario C. Lugones
- Written by: Based upon the novel Mademoiselle Ma Mere by Louis Verneuil
- Starring: Enrique Serrano; Tilda Thamar; Tito Gómez; Miguel Gómez Bao
- Music by: George Andreani
- Production company: Lumiton
- Release date: 22 January 1948
- Running time: 79 minutes
- Country: Argentina
- Language: Spanish

Novio, marido y amante (transl. Boyfriend, husband and lover) is a 1948 Argentine comedy film of the classical era of Argentine cinema, directed by Mario C. Lugones and based upon Louis Verneuil's novel Mademoiselle Ma Mere. It premiered on January 22, 1948.

The film centers on a young beautiful woman that was forced to marry with an elderly man, but now it falls in love with his son.

== Cast ==
- Enrique Serrano
- Tilda Thamar
- Tito Gómez
- Miguel Gómez Bao
- Diego Martinez
- Ignacio de Soroa
- Julio Renato
- Alberto Terrones
- Orestes Soriani
- Fidel Pintos
- Bordignon Olarra
- Nelly Panizza
- Jack O'Neill
- Delia Rivier
- Juan Latrónico
- Renzo Zecca
- Marisa Núñez
- Nelly González
- Susana Campos
- Amelita Vargas

== See also ==
- Mademoiselle ma mère (1936)
