= Un bebé de París =

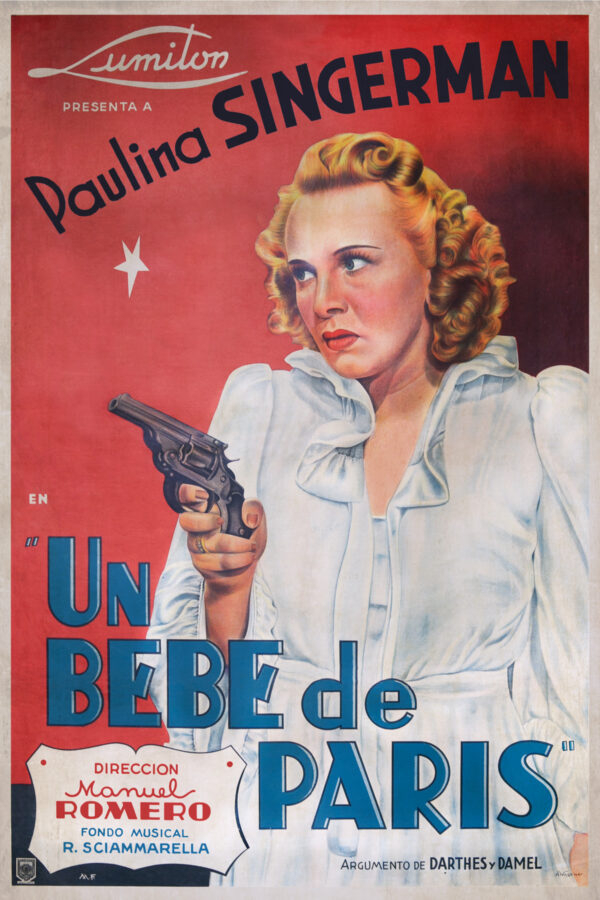
- Theatrical release poster
- Directed by: Manuel Romero
- Written by: Manuel Romero
- Based on: Un bebé de París (1934) by Camilo Darthés and Carlos Damel
- Starring: Paulina Singerman; Enrique Serrano
- Cinematography: Hugo Chiesa
- Edited by: Juan Soffici
- Music by: Rodolfo Sciammarella
- Production company: Lumiton
- Release date: 18 April 1941 (Buenos Aires)
- Running time: 76 minutes
- Country: Argentina
- Language: Spanish

Un bebé de París (Spanish for "A Baby from Paris") is a 1941 Argentine comedy film written and directed by Manuel Romero and starring Paulina Singerman and Enrique Serrano. Produced by Lumiton during the Golden Age of Argentine cinema, it is based on the 1934 play of the same name by Camilo Darthés and Carlos Damel, being one of Romero's few adaptations. The film premiered on 18 April 1941 at the Ocean cinema in Buenos Aires. The fast-paced film is representative of Singerman and Romero at the height of their careers.

== Cast ==
- Paulina Singerman as Raquel
- Enrique Serrano as Andrés
- Ernesto Raquén as Atilio
- Segundo Pomar as Ponciano
- María Esther Podestá as Teodora
- Teresa Serrador as the mother
- María Armand as Prudencia
- Fernando Campos as Federico
- Gerardo Rodríguez as the private detective
- Francisco Audenino as the hardware store owner
- Nelly Campos as Marcela
- Arturo Palito as the waiter

== Critical reception ==
In an unfavorable review, the trade magazine El Heraldo del Cinematografista described the film an "implausible and complicated intrigue, a tangled plot that oscillates between farce and sainete."

== See also ==
- List of works by Manuel Romero
