= Valentina (1950 film) =

- Directed by: Manuel Romero
- Written by: Manuel Romero
- Starring: Olga Zubarry; Juan José Miguez; Elena Lucena; Severo Fernandez
- Cinematography: Alfredo Traverso
- Edited by: Antonio Rampoldi
- Music by: George Andreani
- Production company: Lumiton
- Distributed by: Lumiton
- Release date: 3 May 1950
- Running time: 77 minutes
- Country: Argentina
- Language: Spanish

Valentina is a 1950 Argentine comedy film of the classical era of Argentine cinema, directed by Manuel Romero and starring Olga Zubarry, Juan José Miguez and Elena Lucena. The film's sets were designed by Ricardo J. Conord.

== Cast ==
- Olga Zubarry as Valentina González García
- Juan José Miguez as Pedro López
- Elena Lucena as Catalina Castro
- Severo Fernandez as Andrés Castro
- Norma Giménez as Esther González García
- Enrique Roldán as Raúl
- Mario Faig as Emilio
- Juan José Porta as Ernesto González García
- María Armand as Gertrudis González García
- Amalia Bernabé as Luisa
- Francisco Audenino as César
- Roberto Blanco as Juan, the chauffeur
- Gloria Decco as Maid
- Adolfo Linvel as Salesperson
- Gerardo Rodríguez as Manager automobile industry
- Carlos Bellucci
- José A. Martínez Suárez
- Emilio Vieyra
- Enrique Vieyra
- Jorge Villoldo

== See also ==
- List of works by Manuel Romero

== Bibliography ==
- Insaurralde, Andrés. Manuel Romero. Centro Editor de América Latina, 1994.
