= You Are My Love (film) =

- Directed by: Manuel Romero
- Written by: Manuel Romero
- Starring: Paulina Singerman; Arturo García Buhr; Severo Fernández
- Cinematography: Hugo Chiesa
- Edited by: Nello Melli; Juan Soffici
- Music by: Francisco Balaguer
- Production company: Lumiton
- Distributed by: Lumiton
- Release date: 10 September 1941
- Running time: 87 minutes
- Country: Argentina
- Language: Spanish

You Are My Love (Spanish:Mi amor eres tú) is a 1941 Argentine comedy film of the Golden Age of Argentine cinema, directed by Manuel Romero and starring Paulina Singerman, Arturo García Buhr and Severo Fernández.

== Cast ==
- Paulina Singerman as Susana
- Arturo García Buhr as Roberto Almada
- Severo Fernández as Lucas
- Enrique Roldán as Arturo
- Emilia Helda as Dora
- Cayetano Biondo as Don Ramón
- Rosa Martín as Secretary

== See also ==
- List of works by Manuel Romero

== Bibliography ==
- Andrés Insaurralde. Manuel Romero. Centro Editor de América Latina, 1994.
