= Don Fulgencio =

- Directed by: Enrique Cahen Salaberry
- Starring: Enrique Serrano
- Release date: 1950
- Country: Argentina
- Language: Spanish

Don Fulgencio is a 1950 Argentine film of the classical era of Argentine cinema, directed by Enrique Cahen Salaberry and starring Enrique Serrano. The film is based on various episodes revolving around the popular Argentine character Don Fulgencio, created by Lino Palacio.

== Cast ==
- Enrique Serrano... Don Fulgencio
- Carlos Enríquez... Fernéndez
- Héctor Quintanilla... Pitín
- Oscar Villa ... Radragaz
- Jorge Pittaluga... Tripudio
- Malvina Pastorino ... Mercedes Arévalo "Merceditas"
- Tono Andreu ... Panchito Rosales
- Analía Gadé ... Trinidad
- Warly Ceriani ... Company's director
- Domingo Sapelli ... Gustavo Marín
- José De Ángelis
- Gloria Ramírez
- José Comellas ... Gozález
- Iris Portillo ... Celeste
- Morena Chiolo ... Fulgencio's mother
- Mecha López ... Manuela
- Betty Norton
- Jorge Villoldo ... Francisco Rosales
- Diana Belmont
- Mónica Linares
- Alberto Quiles
- Marisa Núñez
