= Mademoiselle ma mère =

- Theatrical poster
- Directed by: Henri Decoin
- Produced by: Arys Nissotti
- Starring: Danielle Darrieux; Pierre Brasseur; Pierre Larquey
- Cinematography: Léonce-Henri Burel
- Edited by: Marguerite Beaugé
- Music by: Georges Van Parys
- Production company: Régina
- Distributed by: American Tobis Company (USA, 1937); J.H. Hoffberg Company (USA, 1939)
- Release dates: 6 August 1937 (France); 18 September 1939 (USA)
- Running time: 129 minutes
- Country: France
- Language: French

Mademoiselle ma mère (My Mother Is a Miss) is a 1937 French comedy film directed by Henri Decoin, and starring Danielle Darrieux, Pierre Brasseur and Pierre Larquey. The screenplay was written by Jean Boyer, based on a play by Louis Verneuil. The music score is by Georges Van Parys.

It tells the story of a rich young girl who avoids having sex with her older husband and falls in love with her stepson. The film was remade as Novio, marido y amante (1948) in Argentina.

== Plot ==
Jaqueline's father is tired of her free spirit life, and to make things worst she just broke up with her fourteenth fiancé and they argue about it. In order to upset her daddy even more the young lady decided to marry Albert Letournel, a wealthy man who is in his fifties.
