= Tania (tango singer) =

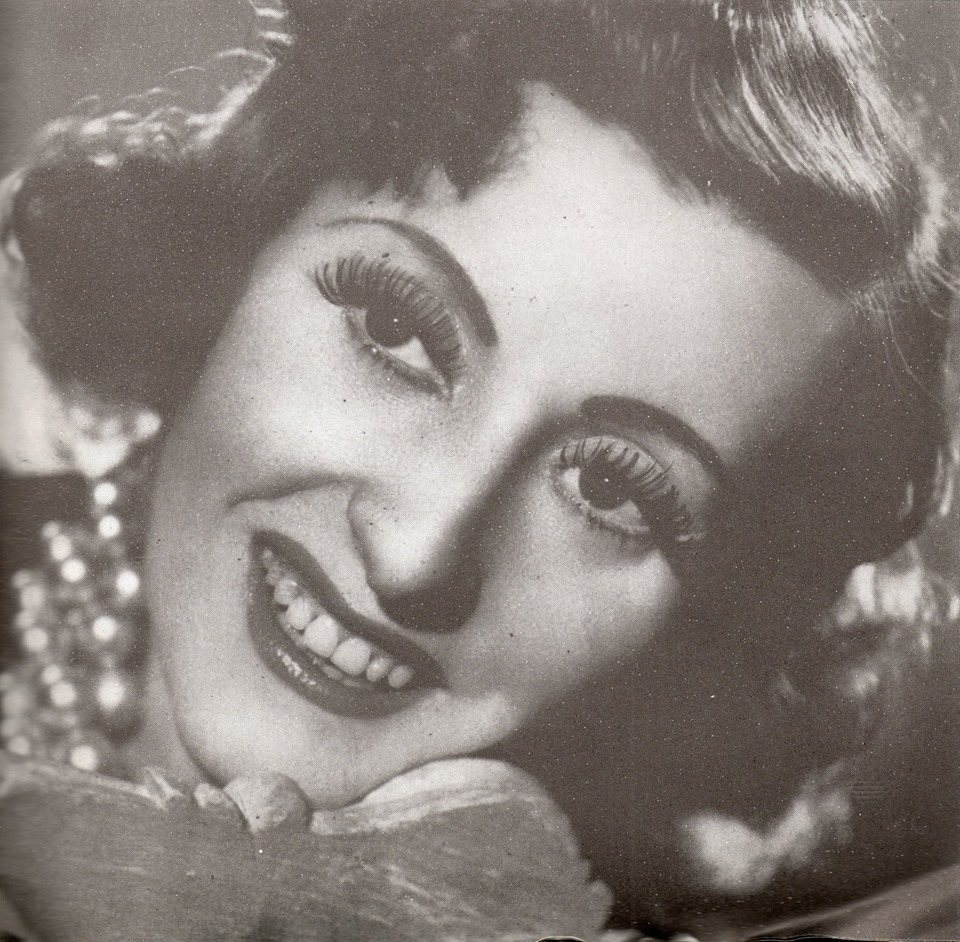
- Born: Ana Luciano Divis; 13 October 1908; Toledo, Spain
- Died: 17 February 1999 (aged 90); Buenos Aires, Argentina
- Occupation: Tango singer
- Years active: 1917-1988
- Known for: tango interpretation

Tania (13 October 1908 – 17 February 1999) was the stage name of Spanish tango singer Ana Luciano Divis. She was one of the most significant tango interpreters of her era. She was honored as an Illustrious Citizen of the City of Buenos Aires and a Personality of Argentine Culture, as well as receiving the Order of Isabella the Catholic from Juan Carlos I of Spain.

== Biography ==
Ana Luciano Divis was born in Toledo, Spain on 13 October, but the year varies in reports from 1893 to 1901, as the artist took measures to obscure the date, though she admitted to being over 100 years old, indicating that the earlier time frame is probably more accurate. Her father, a career military officer, was Amalio Luciano and her mother was Carmen Divis. Ana was the youngest of four siblings. The family moved to Valencia when she was two and she performed in theater and singing groups as a child. When Ana decided to pursue a career in performance, she chose to go by the stage name Tania, after a Russian school friend, to avoid confusion with her older sister Isabel, a light opera performer. At the age of eighteen she formed her own company and performed a variety show which toured Alicante, Barcelona, and Madrid. During a tour in Morocco, she met and married the Mexican dancer, Antonio Fernández Rodríguez, and became known as Mexican Tania. Tania's only child, Anita, who later performed as Choly Mur, was born from the marriage.

In 1923, they traveled to Argentina as part of the Iberian Troupe led by Teresita España. The initial tour included performances in Brazil, where a guitarist, Mario Pardo, suggested she perform a tango, "Fumando espero", which was well received and she added it to her repertoire. Later she added the tango "Esta noche me emborracho", which would lead to her introduction to the composer who would become her life companion. By 1926, the troupe fell apart, her marriage had floundered and her husband returned to Spain, but Tania returned to Buenos Aires, as a solo act called "The Galician of Toledo". In 1927, José Razzano introduced her to Enrique Santos Discépolo at a cabaret performance of the Buenos Aires version of the Folies Bergère. Razzano wanted Discépolo to hear Tania's rendition of his song. Almost from their meeting, they were never separated, though they did not marry. She was called Discépolo's muse, but both of their careers took off once they joined their artistic and personal lives. He became a noted composer of tangos and she was one of the most popular interpreters of the genre.

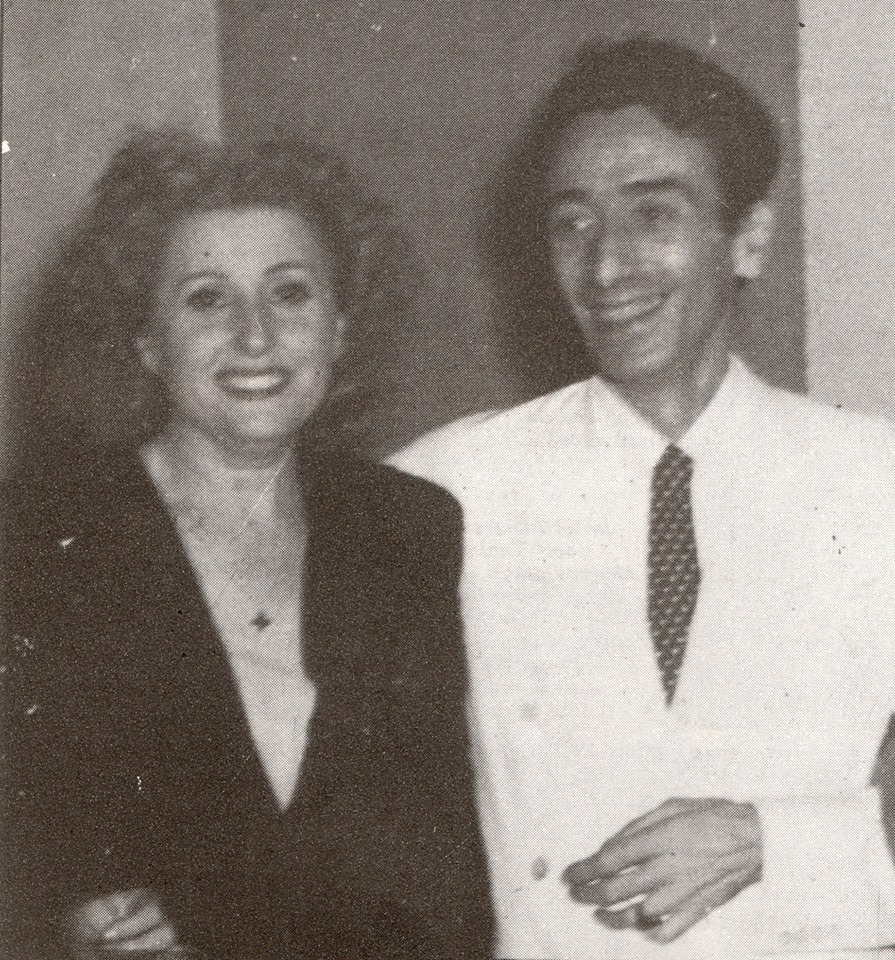
Tania and Enrique Santos Discépolo

In the 1930s, Tania performed in live theater with shows under Discépolo's direction, including "La Perichona" and "Mis canciones" in 1932, "Wunder Bar" in 1933 and "Winter Garden" in 1935. She sang on the radio beginning with a performance on Radio Prieto and then in 1937 sang on Radio Municipal. She worked on three films, El pobre Pérez (1937) with Luis César Amadori, Cuatro corazones (1939) and Caprichosa y millonaria (1940) both under the direction of Discépolo. They also had successes in the 1940s, with Tania performing as a soloist on Del Pueblo, Paris and Belgrano radio stations. She performed in "El Mundo" (the World) in 1945 with Mariano Mores. In 1946, they did a tour through Bolivia, Chile, Cuba, Mexico and Peru and then in 1947, Tania did a series on Radio Belgrano called "Cómo nacieron mis canciones" (How my songs were born) with Discépolo and made recordings with Columbia Records, Odeon Records and RCA Victor. She returned to live theater with "Blum" in 1949 and then did the same show in a final theatrical season from 1950 to 1951, the year Discépolo died, at the Teatro Gran Splendid.

After Discépolo's death, Tania left Argentina, making an extended tour of Latin America and Europe. In part, it was due to her support of Juan Perón and the backlash against his supporters after his ouster in 1955. Tania did not return to Argentina until 1959, when she returned to help inaugurate a memorial home for the tango, which became known as "Cambalache", located on Libertad street near its intersection with Córdoba. She wrote her memoirs in 1973 with Jorge Miguel Couselo, but tango had gone out of style in the 1960s and would not make a comeback until the 1980s. When worldwide recognition of the genre re-emerged, Tania's recordings from the 1930s and 1940s were at the forefront again. From 1983 to 1988 she performed at the Teatro de la Ribera, simultaneously performing in "Botica de Tango" on Channel 11.

In 1989, she was declared an Illustrious Citizen of the City of Buenos Aires by the city council. In 1993, she received from King Juan Carlos I of Spain the Order of Isabella the Catholic and then in 1998, Tania was declared an Honored Personality of the Culture of Argentina by the Ministry of Culture. She died on 17 February 1999 in the apartment she had shared with Discépolo and was buried in La Chacarita Cemetery in Buenos Aires, Argentina.

== Bibliography ==
- Gutiérrez Miglio, Roberto (1992). El tango y sus intérpretes: vida y discografía de los cantores y cancionistas del tango (in Spanish). Buenos Aires, Argentina: Corregidor. ISBN 978-950-05-0685-4.
