= By the Light of a Star =

- Directed by: Enrique Santos Discépolo
- Written by: Armando Discépolo; Enrique Santos Discépolo
- Starring: Hugo del Carril; Ana María Lynch; María Esther Gamas; Zully Moreno
- Cinematography: Adam Jacko
- Edited by: Oscar Carchano
- Music by: José Vázquez Vigo; Enrique Santos Discépolo
- Production company: Establecimientos Filmadores Argentinos
- Distributed by: Establecimientos Filmadores Argentinos
- Release date: 7 May 1941
- Running time: 86 minutes
- Country: Argentina
- Language: Spanish

By the Light of a Star (Spanish:En la luz de una estrella) is a 1941 Argentine musical drama film directed by Enrique Santos Discépolo and starring Hugo del Carril, Ana María Lynch and María Esther Gamas. It is a tango film, an extremely popular genre during the Golden Age of Argentine cinema.

== Synopsis ==
A successful tango singer struggles to cope with the demands and opportunities of fame.

== Cast ==
- Hugo del Carril as Jorge
- Ana María Lynch
- María Esther Gamas
- Zully Moreno
- Cirilo Etulain
- Eduardo Sandrini
- Adolfo Stray
- Bernardo Perrone
- Carlos Lagrotta
- Julio Renato
- Adolfo Meyer
- Lina Estevez
- Sabina Vittone
- José S. Harold
- José Ruzzo
- Casimiro Ros
- Manuel Alcón
- Eduardo de Labar

== Bibliography ==
- Rist, Peter H. Historical Dictionary of South American Cinema. Rowman & Littlefield, 2014.
