= The Fan (1951 film) =

- Directed by: Manuel Romero
- Written by: Julio Porter; Manuel Romero; Enrique Santos Discépolo
- Starring: Enrique Santos Discépolo; Diana Maggi; Mario Passano
- Cinematography: Alberto Etchebehere
- Edited by: Higinio Vecchione
- Music by: Silvio Vernazza
- Production company: Argentina Sono Film
- Release date: 13 April 1951
- Running time: 102 minutes
- Country: Argentina
- Language: Spanish

The Fan (Spanish: El Hincha) is a 1951 Argentine sports comedy film of the classical era of Argentine cinema, directed by Manuel Romero and starring Enrique Santos Discépolo, Diana Maggi and Mario Passano.

== Cast ==
- Enrique Santos Discépolo
- Diana Maggi
- Mario Passano
- María Esther Buschiazzo
- Renée Dumas
- Lía Durán
- Vicente Forastieri
- Juan José Porta
- Mariano Bauzá
- Héctor Casares
- Mario Conflitti
- Pablo Cumo
- Mario Faig
- Antonio Provitilo
- Aída Villadeamigo

== See also ==
- List of works by Manuel Romero
