= Honeymoon in Rio =

- Directed by: Manuel Romero
- Written by: Manuel Romero
- Starring: Niní Marshall; Tito Lusiardo; Enrique Serrano
- Cinematography: Alfredo Traverso
- Edited by: Juan Soffici
- Music by: Rodolfo Sciammarella
- Release date: 9 October 1940
- Running time: 86 minutes
- Country: Argentina
- Language: Spanish

Honeymoon in Rio (Spanish: Luna de miel en Río) is a 1940 Argentine comedy film of the Golden Age of Argentine cinema, directed by Manuel Romero and starring Niní Marshall, Tito Lusiardo and Enrique Serrano.

The film's art direction was by Ricardo J. Conord.

== Cast ==
- Niní Marshall as Catita
- Tito Lusiardo as Gorostiaga
- Enrique Serrano as Goyena
- Juan Carlos Thorry as Emilio
- Alicia Barrié as Cristina
- Carmen del Moral as Susana
- Enrique Roldán as Rosales
- Zaira Cavalcanti as Mercedes

== See also ==
- List of works by Manuel Romero

== Bibliography ==
- Rist, Peter H. Historical Dictionary of South American Cinema. Rowman & Littlefield, 2014.
