= Roberto Blanco (actor) =

Argentine actor

- Born: 1903; Argentina
- Died: 1965 (aged 61–62); Argentina
- Occupation: Actor
- Years active: 1936-1965 (film)

Roberto Blanco (1903–1965) was an Argentine stage and film actor. He appeared in more than thirty films during his career many of them during the Golden Age of Argentine Cinema.

== Selected filmography ==
- The Boys of the Old Days Didn't Use Hair Gel (1937)
- Outside the Law (1937)
- Isabelita (1940)
- I Want to Be a Chorus Girl (1941)
- The Tango Returns to Paris (1948)
- Valentina (1950)

== Bibliography ==
- Finkielman, Jorge (2004) The Film Industry in Argentina: An Illustrated Cultural History. McFarland, ISBN 978-0-7864-1628-8
