= The Black Market (film) =

1953 film by Kurt Land

- Directed by: Kurt Land
- Written by: Miguel Briante; Roberto Iglesias; Miguel Ligero; Virgilio Muguerza
- Starring: Olga Zubarry; Santiago Gómez Cou; Mario Passano
- Cinematography: Humberto Peruzzi
- Edited by: José Cardella
- Music by: Anatole Pietri
- Production company: Mapol Film
- Release date: 25 June 1953
- Running time: 83 minutes
- Country: Argentina
- Language: Spanish

The Black Market (Spanish:Mercado negro) is a 1953 Argentine crime film of the classical era of Argentine cinema, directed by Kurt Land and starring Olga Zubarry, Santiago Gómez Cou and Mario Passano. The film's sets were designed by Carlos T. Dowling. A policeman discovers that his girlfriend's father heads a drug smuggling outfit.

== Cast ==
- Olga Zubarry as Laura
- Santiago Gómez Cou as Inspector Alfredo Herrera
- Fausto Padín as Camionero
- Eduardo de Labar as Don Ramón
- Mario Passano
- Nelly Panizza
- Luis Otero
- José De Angelis
- Miguel Ligero
- Félix Rivero
- José María Pedroza
- Mario Lozano
- César Fiaschi
- Carlos Cotto
- Fernando Labat
- Carlos Fioriti
- Antonio Capuano
- Perla Molina
- Luis Mora
- Salvador Sinai
- Tito Perlat
- Oscar Llompart
- Alfredo Almanza
- Carlos Guisone
- Horacio de Bello
- Jorge Arias
- Arsenio Perdiguero
- Elena Cruz
- Alberto Barcel
- Alberto Bello
- Amalia Bernabé

== Bibliography ==
- Elena, Alberto & Lopez, Marina Diaz. The Cinema of Latin America. Columbia University Press, 2013.
