= The Tango Returns to Paris =

1948 film

- Directed by: Manuel Romero
- Written by: Manuel Romero
- Produced by: Edgardo Togni
- Starring: Alberto Castillo; Elvira Rios; Severo Fernández; Fernando Lamas; Lilian Valmar
- Cinematography: Antonio Merayo
- Edited by: Jorge Gárate; José Serra
- Music by: Rodolfo Sciammarella
- Production company: Argentina Sono Film
- Distributed by: Argentina Sono Film
- Release date: 16 January 1948
- Running time: 85 minutes
- Country: Argentina
- Language: Spanish

The Tango Returns to Paris (Spanish:El tango vuelve a París) is a 1948 Argentine musical comedy film of the classical era of Argentine cinema, written and directed by Manuel Romero. It was premiered on January 16, 1948.

The film's plot is about a doctor who arrives to Paris that will become a tango singer.

== Cast ==
- Alberto Castillo as Alberto Reinald
- Elvira Ríos as Lupe Torres
- Severo Fernández as Medizábal
- Lilian Valmar as Azucena
- Julio Renato as Don Fermín
- Aníbal Troilo as Pichuco
- Fernando Lamas as Flores
- Juan José Porta as Don Jorge Reinald
- Antonio Provitilo as Dupont
- Carlos Rosingana as Renaud
- Roberto Blanco as Fernández
- Betty Corté as La Muñeca
- Alfredo Jordan as El Amigo
- Carlos Cambria as El Comisario

== See also ==
- List of works by Manuel Romero
