= Paulina Singerman =

Argentine actress (1911–1984)

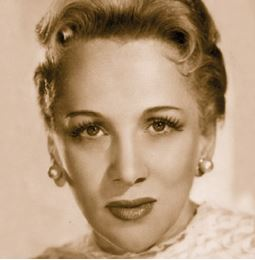
- Born: Paulina Singerman Begun; 1911; Buenos Aires, Argentina
- Died: 9 February 1984 (aged 72–73); Buenos Aires, Argentina
- Occupations: Actress, businesswoman
- Years active: 1927–1980

Paulina Singerman Begun (1911 – 9 February 1984) was an Argentine actress in theater, film, and television. She began her film career during the Golden Age of Argentine cinema as the lead in La rubia del camino (1938), directed by Manuel Romero for Lumiton. The film established a formula she would repeat in other comedies in which she specialized in playing young, arrogant millionaires, such as Caprichosa y millonaria (1940), by Enrique Santos Discépolo, and Isabelita (1940) and Elvira Fernández, vendedora de tienda (1942), both directed by Romero. In the later part of her career, she spent a decade performing for television. She was the younger sister of actress Berta Singerman. In 1981, she was awarded both a Diploma of Merit and a Platinum Konex for her comedy work in film and theatre.

== Biography ==
Paulina Singerman Begun was born in 1911 in Buenos Aires to a Russian Jewish immigrant family. From an early age, Singerman and her sister Berta and their neighbour, Amelia Bence performed with other neighbourhood children in the courtyards of their homes. It was actually Paulina who suggested to Bence's mother that she should take acting classes at the Lavardén Children's Theater, operating in the Teatro Colón, where Singerman was studying.

At the age of 14, she entered the Conservatorio Nacional de Música y Arte Escénico (National Conservatory of Music and Performing Arts). Her theatre debut was in Una cura de reposo in 1927 when she appeared on stage with Florencio Parravicini in a play by Enrique Garcia Velloso.

By 1932, she had formed her own theatre company, and was performing dramatic works such as Taming of the Shrew and Amor. She married the businessman José "Pepe" Vázquez, who became her business manager and they had twin sons. Their company toured from Latin America to the United States, in Cuba, Portugal, and Spain.

In 1936, they were in Mexico producing a play called Brujería by Oduvaldo Vianna at the Teatro Arbeu and it was followed by a production of Amor at the same theatre. In 1937, they were travelling and performing in the US. Plays included Todo Un Hombre, Amor, Terra Baja, and Cuando Los Hijos de Eva no son Lo Hijos de Adan. Then they headed to Rio de Janeiro before making their way back to Buenos Aires at the beginning of 1938.

In 1938, Singerman starred in her first film, La rubia del camino directed by Manuel Romero and received accolades as a comedian. She then made Retazo (1939), Caprichosa y millonaria (1940) directed by Enrique Santos Discepolo, Isabelita (1940) directed by Manuel Romero, Un bebé de París (1941), Mi amor eres tú (1941) and others ending with Hay que casar a Paulina (1944). In all, she made 10 films in short order most following the same pattern, comedies, and either had the theme of an unruly woman being tamed or a rich woman falling for a poor man. In Elvira Fernández, vendedora de tiendas (1942), one of her best known films, Singerman played the daughter of a millionaire store owner who organises a worker strike.

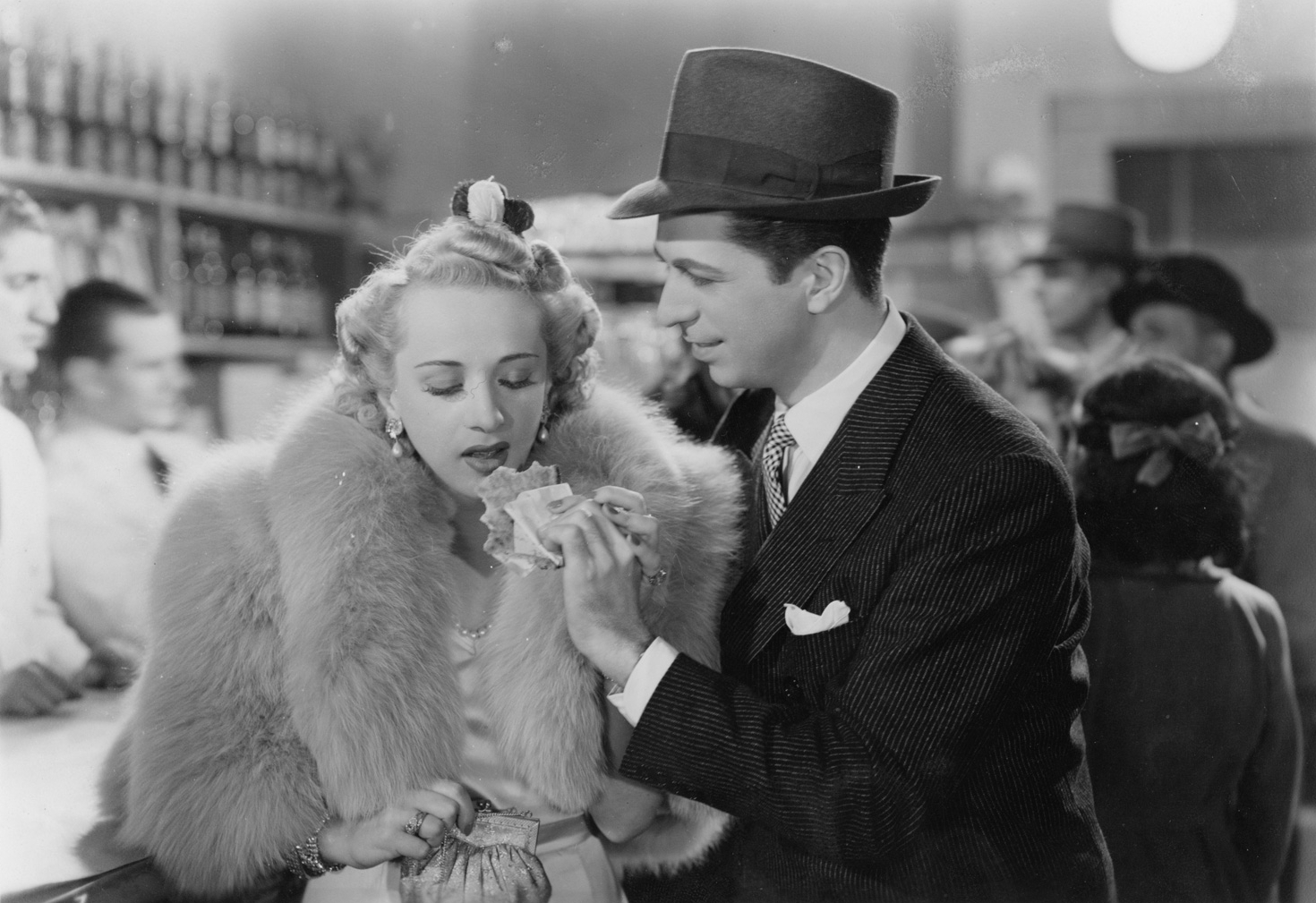
In the 1940 comedy film Isabelita, Singerman portrays an aristocratic girl who immerses herself in the working-class culture of Buenos Aires, with pizza being one of its defining aspects.

When Juan Perón came to power, Singerman was exiled and returned to touring, which served to enhance her reputation. She toured Spain and South America producing such plays as Aquí estoy y aquí me quedo, Constancia, Mujeres, Querido Coco, Rosas amarillas y rosas rojas, Trece a la mesa, Una noche a la italiana among others.

When her exile ended she returned to Argentina and continued to act on stage starring in Fiddler on the Roof in 1969 as Golde, the fiddler's wife. At the dawn of the 1970s, she began acting on television and played numerous roles in series and made for TV movies.

In 1972, she starred in Pan criollo, junto a Luis Sandrini a play by César Tiempo. Her last television program was Una noche a la italiana made in 1979.

== Death ==
Paulina Singerman died on 9 February 1984 in Buenos Aires, aged 72 or 73.

== Awards ==
- 1981 Platinum Konex for Comedy in film and theater Konex Foundation
- 1981 Diploma of Merit for Comedy in film and theater Konex Foundation

== Selected filmography ==
=== Films ===
- La rubia del camino (1938)
- Caprichosa y millonaria (1940)
- Isabelita (1940)
- Un bebé de París (1941)
- You Are My Love (1941)
- Elvira Fernández, vendedora de tiendas (1942)
- Luisito (1943)
- Hay que casar a Paulina (1944)

=== Television ===
- Viernes de Pacheco (1970)
- Historias de mamá y papá (1970–1973)
- Alta comedia (TV Series) (1971)
- Pan criollo (1972)
- Qué vida de locos! (1973)
- Humor a la italiana (1974)
- La comedia brillante (1974)
- Constancia, una esposa constante (TV Movie) (1976)
- Una noche a la italiana (1979)
