= Armando Discépolo =

Argentine playwright (1887–1971)

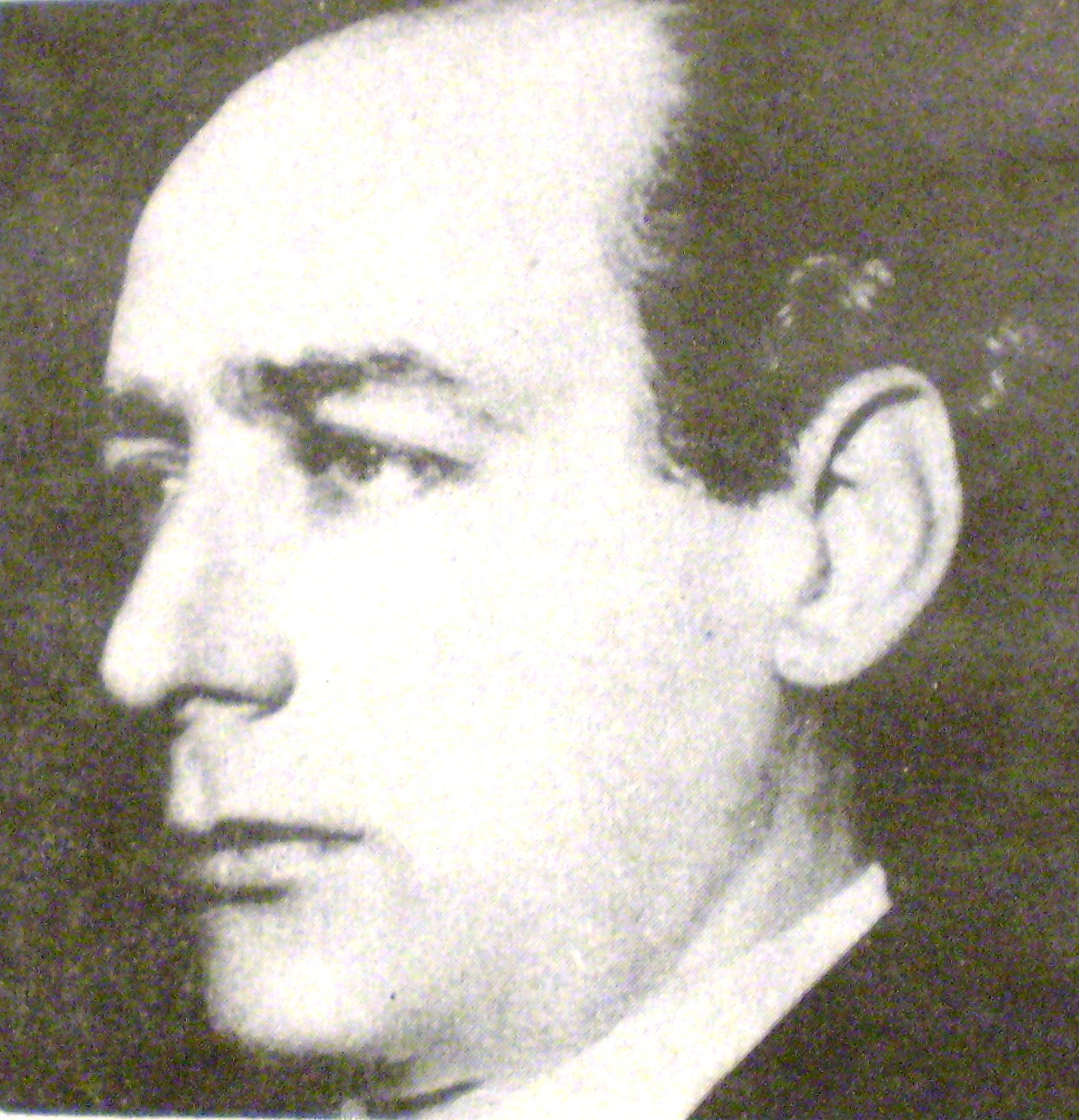
- Born: 18 September 1887; Buenos Aires, Argentina
- Died: 8 January 1971 (aged 83); Buenos Aires, Argentina
- Occupations: playwright, theater producer
- Years active: 1910–1934
- Known for: creating Argentine Criollo Grotesque

Armando Discépolo (1887–1971) was an Argentine playwright. His most productive writing time spanned from 1910 to 1934 and thereafter, he produced theatrical performances of his plays. He is credited with creating and developing the Argentine version of grotesque literature known as Criollo Grotesque or Creole Grotesque, which is characterized by a mixture melodramatic tragic satire and domestic discord.

== Biography ==
Armando Discépolo was born on 18 September 1887 in Buenos Aires, Argentina to parents of Italian heritage. His mother, Luisa Delucchi, though Argentine by birth descended from Genoan immigrants and his father, Santo Discépolo was a musician from Naples. Discépolo was the eldest of five children, all of whom became artists, but he and his younger brother, tango writer Enrique Santos Discépolo were the most well known. He quit school in the sixth grade and had early dreams of becoming an actor. After his father died in 1906, he debuted in a play by Félix Alberto de Zavalía but quickly got bored with the repetitive performance required for acting. After his mother discovered a notebook filled with dialogue and suggested he try writing his own works, he began composing around 1909. His first play Entre el hierro he offered to a friend, Pablo Podestá, who agreed to debut it; it was a resounding success. Thereafter, he created an average of two plays per year until 1934.

In 1911, he released La torcaz at the Teatro Nacional Cervantes and El rincón de los besos at the Teatro Moderno. In 1912, he collaborated with Rafael José de Rosa on La espuma de mar which was performed by the company of Florencio Parravicini at the Teatro Buenos Aires and his La fragua of the same year was his most acclaimed work during this early period before the emergence of his farcical style. With play Mustafá written with de Rosa, Criollo Grotesque begins to emerge. The style is not based on a Spanish tradition, but rather an Italian one and uses passion and jealousy mixed with domestic conflict and comic irony in a tragic satire approaching melodrama, but a very important element is usually that the exterior or environmental aspects are in total disharmony with the internal or human emotional aspects of the work. The play premiered in 1921 at the National Theater by the company of Pascual Carcavallo. With each play he created, Discépolo refined the genre. His finest works of his later period include Mateo (1923), Stéfano (1928), Cremona (1932) and Relojero (1934). Relojero would be his last written play, though he did two screenplays and authored a script in the late 1930s and early 1940s: Mateo (1937), Giácomo (1939) and En la luz de una estrella (1941). For the remainder of his career, he produced theatrical works, many of his own, but also works by Chekhov, Somerset Maugham, Shakespeare, Shaw and Tolstoy.

He died on 8 January 1971 in Buenos Aires, Argentina.

== Selected works ==
=== Solo theatrical productions ===
- Entre el hierro (1910)
- La torcaz (1911)
- La fragua (1912)
- El reverso (1916)
- El vértigo (1919)
- Mateo (1923)
- Hombres de honor (1923)
- Giacomo (1924)
- Muñeca (1924)
- Babilonia (1925)
- Patria nueva (1926)
- Stéfano (1928)
- Levántate y anda (1929)
- Amanda y Eduardo (1931)
- Cremona (1932)
- Relojero (1934)

=== Collaborative theatrical works ===
- Espuma de mar (1912) with Rafael José de Rosa
- Mi mujer se aburre (1914) with Rafael José de Rosa
- El novio de mamá (1914) with Rafael de Rosa and Mario Folco
- El patio de la flores (1915) with Federico Mertens
- El guarda 323 (1915) with Rafael José de Rosa
- El movimiento continuo (1916) with Rafael de Rosa and Mario Folco
- Conservatorio La Armonia (1917) with Rafael de Rosa and Mario Folco
- El clavo de oro (1920) with Rafael de Rosa and Mario Folco
- Mustafá (1921) with Rafael José de Rosa
- L’Italia unita (1922) with Rafael José de Rosa
- Giacomo (1924) with Rafael José de Rosa
- El organito (1925) with Enrique Santos Discépolo

=== Filmography ===
- El movimiento continuo (1916) screenwriter
- Mateo (1937) author
- Giácomo (1939) screenwriter
- En la luz de una estrella (1941) screenwriter
- Babilonia (1987) author
