= Behind a Long Wall =

1958 film directed by Lucas Demare

- Theatrical release poster
- Directed by: Lucas Demare
- Written by: Sixto Pondal Ríos
- Starring: Susana Campos; Gloria Ferrandiz
- Cinematography: Antonio Merayo
- Edited by: Jorge Gárate
- Music by: Lucio Demare
- Production company: Argentina Sono Film
- Release date: 3 March 1958
- Country: Argentina
- Language: Spanish

Behind a Long Wall (Spanish: Detrás de un largo muro) is a 1958 Argentine drama film directed by Lucas Demare and starring Susana Campos, Gloria Ferrandiz and Ricardo Argemí. A rural family emigrate to Buenos Aires with high expectations, but ends up living in a shanty town.

== Cast ==
- Susana Campos as Rosita
- Gloria Ferrandiz
- Ricardo Argemí
- Francisco Audenino
- Alberto Barcel
- Cayetano Biondo
- Warly Ceriani
- Yamandú Di Paula
- Rafael Diserio
- Rolando Dumas
- Domingo Garibotto as Viejo en bomba de agua
- Olga Madero
- Rita Montesi
- Inés Moreno
- Lautaro Murúa
- María Nieves
- Marisa Núñez
- Luis Orbegozo as Hombre en bomba de agua
- Jorge Palaz
- Mario Passano
- Félix Rivero
- Jorge Villalba as Amigo de Pedro

== Bibliography ==
- Michael Pigott & Santiago Oyarzabel. World Film Locations: Buenos Aires. Intellect Ltd, 2014.
