= Avivato =

- Directed by: Enrique Cahen Salaberry
- Written by: Enrique Cahen Salaberry; Ariel Cortazzo
- Produced by: Enrique Cahen Salaberry
- Starring: Pepe Iglesias; Benita Puértolas; Lilian Valmar
- Cinematography: Roque Giaccovino
- Edited by: Jorge Gárate
- Music by: Rodolfo Sciammarella
- Distributed by: Interamericana
- Release date: 1949
- Running time: 79 minutes
- Country: Argentina
- Language: Spanish

Avivato is a 1949 Argentine film of the classical era of Argentine cinema, directed and written by Enrique Cahen Salaberry with Ariel Cortazzo. Starring Pepe Iglesias.

screenshot

== Cast ==
- Pepe Iglesias as Avivato
- Benita Puértolas
- Lilian Valmar
- Alberto Terrones
- Tono Andreu
- Francisco Audenino
- Roberto Blanco
- Alberto Soler
