= María Armand =

Argentine dancer, stage and film actress

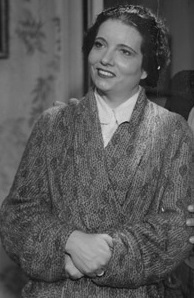
- María Armand in 1939
- Born: March 22, 1917; Buenos Aires
- Occupations: Actress, Dancer
- Years active: 1938-1970 (film)

María Armand (born March 22, 1917) was an Argentine dancer, stage and film actress of the Golden Age of Argentine cinema. She appeared in around thirty films during her career. Her sister was the stage actress Ángela Armand.

== Filmography ==
- 1938: The Gossiper
- 1938: Jettatore
- 1939: Affluent People
- 1941: Un bebé de París
- 1941: El tesoro de la isla Maciel
- 1945: Swan Song
- 1945: Allá en el setenta y tantos
- 1946: Inspiración
- 1947: Los verdes paraísos
- 1948: Porteña de corazón
- 1949: The Story of the Tango
- 1950: Valentina
- 1950: Abuso de confianza
- 1951: Cartas de amor
- 1951: La calle junto a la luna
- 1953: The Best of the School
- 1955: Para vestir santos
- 1958: La hermosa mentira
- 1960: La Casa de la Troya (TV series, (39 episodes)
- 1961: El sí de las niñas (TV Series 19 episodes)
- 1961: La maestra enamorada
- 1961: El mago de las finanzas
- 1962: Señorita Medianoche (TV series, 39 episodes)
- 1963: Canuto Cañete, conscripto del 7
- 1963: Canuto Cañete y los 40 ladrones
- 1964: Cuando calienta el sol
- 1964: Cuidado con las colas
- 1965: Disloque en el presidio
- 1966: Buenos Aires, Summer 1912
- 1970: Con alma y vida
- 1970: With Life and Soul

== Bibliography ==
- Pellettieri, Osvaldo. Dos escenarios: intercambio teatral entre España y la Argentina. Editorial Galerna, 2006.
