= Teatro Florida =

Coordinates: 36°7′38″N 5°26′56″W

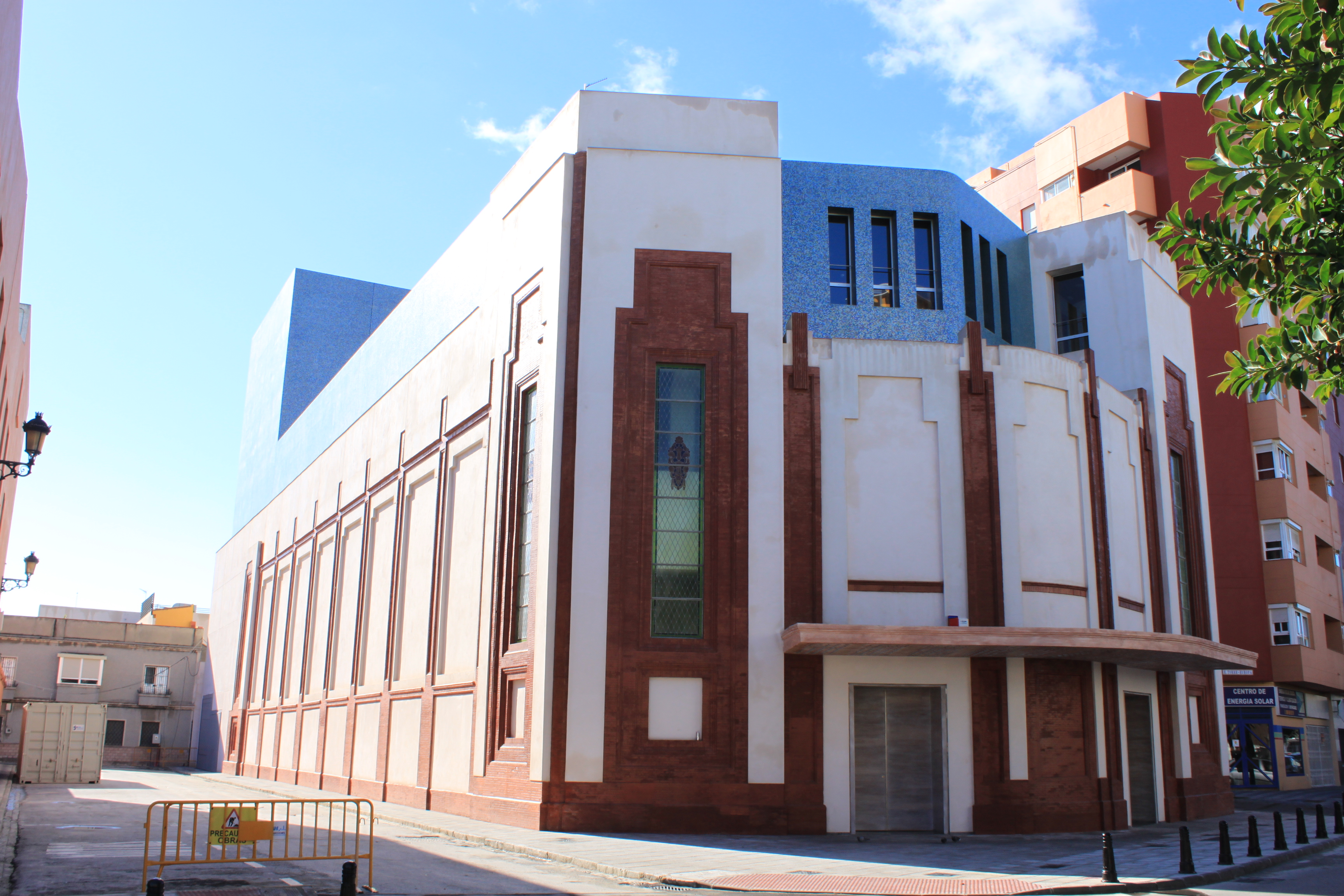

Teatro Florida is a municipal theatre in the city of Algeciras, southeastern Spain. The building was constructed between 1944 and 1945, by the architect Mariano Aznárez Torán, with an expressionist-inspired facade with a geometric design. In 2006 the old theatre underwent a full restoration, promoted by the government of the Province of Cádiz due to the poor conditions of the old building. The first event held in the theatre after rehabilitation was a local contest held on 11 December 2011, before the official reopening on December 20 of the same year.

== Biography ==
The building was constructed between 1944 and 1945 by architect Mariano Aznárez Torán to serve as a movie theater; its architecture is notable for its Expressionist-inspired façade with geometric decorative details.Following renovations in 1971 that allowed it to be used for theatrical and musical performances, on September 27, 1985, it came under the jurisdiction of the city council, thereby expanding the city’s cultural offerings and taking advantage of the building’s proximity to the former Hospital de la Caridad (Algeciras), headquarters of the José Luis Cano Municipal Cultural Foundation.

Since 2006, the former Florida Movie Theater has been undergoing restoration led by the Cádiz Provincial Council as part of the Culturcad project, due to the poor condition of the building.The renovation work, with a budget of 6,557,711 euros, was carried out by the company Procondal, which demolished the building while preserving the façade, as it was considered a unique feature of the municipality. Inside, however, the theater’s seating capacity was reduced from the original 900 seats to 650.

The first event held at the theater following its renovation was the local Christmas rondalla contest on December 11, 2011, while the official reopening took place on December 20 of that same year with the performance of La voz del agua by guitarist Salvador Andrades, pianist Chico Valdivia, and texts by Juan Casal Ortiz, directed by José Ignacio Landaluce, the city’s mayor, José Loaiza, president of the Cádiz Provincial Council, Paz Sánchez, director general of Innovation and Cultural Industries for the Regional Government of Andalusia, and Yolanda Peinado, provincial delegate for the Department of Culture.
