= Mario Faig =

Argentine actor

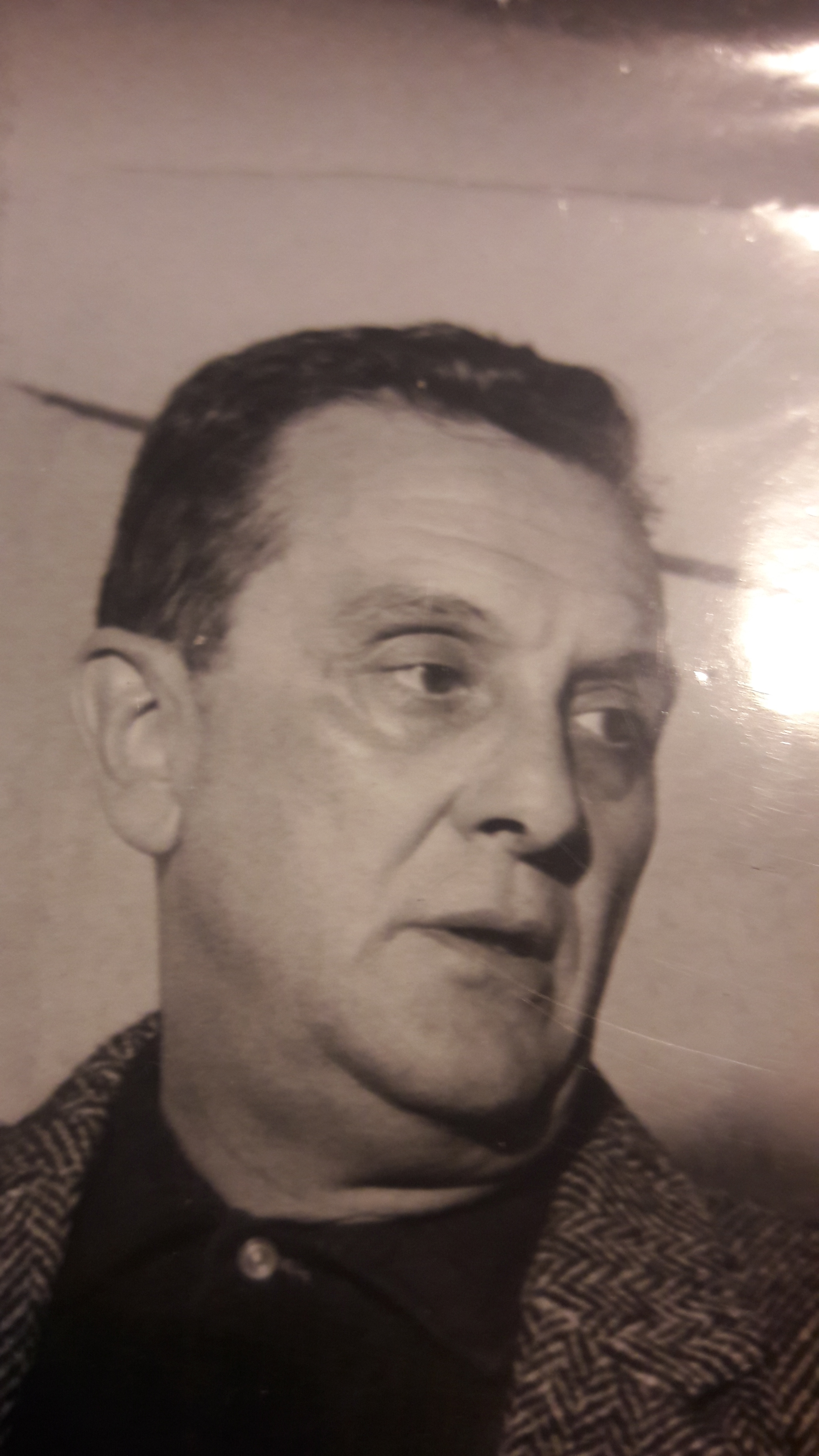
- Born: 1905; Argentina
- Died: 3 November 1984 (aged 78–79); Buenos Aires, Argentina
- Occupation: Actor
- Years active: 1937-1955 (film)

Mario Faig (1905–1984) was an Argentine film actor. Faig appeared in twenty films during his career. He was married to the actress Gloria Ugarte.

== Selected filmography ==
- Madame Sans-Gêne (1945)
- Valentina (1950)
- The Fan (1951)
- The Lady of the Camellias (1953)

== Bibliography ==
- Insaurralde, Andrés. Manuel Romero. Centro Editor de América Latina, 1994.
