= Juan José Porta =

Argentine actor

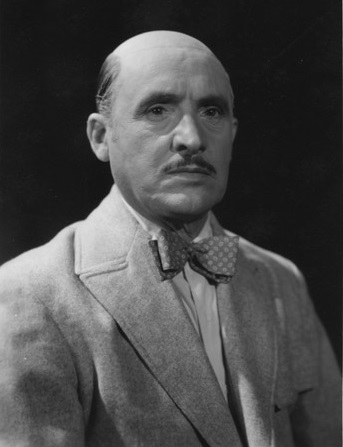
- The actor in 1948
- Born: 1895; Buenos Aires, Argentina
- Died: 13 July 1973 (aged 77–78); Buenos Aires, Argentina
- Occupation: Actor
- Years active: 1938–1952 (film)

Juan José Porta was an Argentine stage and film actor. He appeared in twenty three films during the Golden Age of Argentine Cinema.

== Selected filmography ==
- The Minister's Daughter (1943)
- Modern Husbands (1948)
- The Tango Returns to Paris (1948)
- Juan Mondiola (1950)
- Valentina (1950)
- The Fan (1951)

== Bibliography ==
- Insaurralde, Andrés. Manuel Romero. Centro Editor de América Latina, 1994.
