= Cayetano Biondo =

Argentine actor

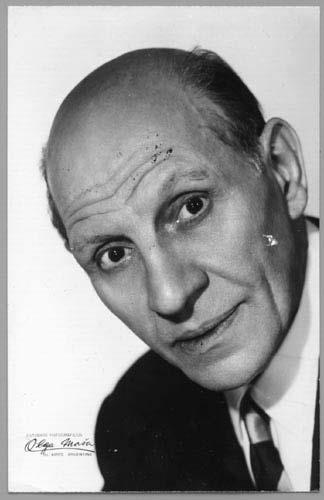
- Born: Cayetano Amadeo Biondo; 1902; Buenos Aires, Argentina
- Died: 1986 (aged 83–84)
- Years active: 1936–1986

Cayetano Amadeo Biondo (1902–1986) was an Argentine film actor.

He starred in some 65 films between 1936 and his death in 1986 spanning 50 years of Argentine cinema.

== Career ==
Biondo made his debut in 1936 in the film Santos Vega and in 1938 appeared in the Mario Soffici film Kilómetro 111.

In 1981 he starred in the film Tiempo de revancha which co-starred actors such as Federico Luppi and Ulises Dumont.

His last film shortly before his death was Colimbas se divierten.

== Selected films ==
- Santos Vega (1936)
- Kilómetro 111 (1938)
- El tesoro de la isla Maciel (1941)
- You Are My Love (1941)
- Juan Moreira (1948)
- End of the Month (1953)
- Behind a Long Wall (1958)
- El Gordo catástrofe (1977)
- Tiempo de revancha (1981)
- Colimbas se divierten (1986)
