= Enrique Serrano =

Argentine actor & comedian (1891–1965)

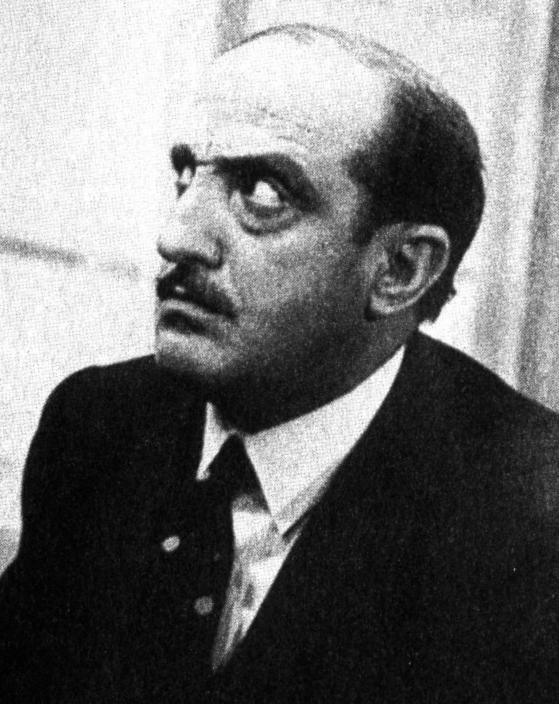
- Born: 1891; Buenos Aires, Argentina
- Died: 1965 (age 73–74)
- Years active: 1935–1964

Enrique Serrano (1891–1965) was an Argentine actor and comedian notable for his work during the Golden Age of Argentine cinema.

He appeared in many films of the 1940s and 1950s including Muchachas que estudian, Asi es la vida (1939). He starred in some 40 films between 1935 and 1964.

== Films ==
- 1916 Hasta después de muerta ('Til After Her Death)
- 1935 Noches de Buenos Aires (Buenos Aires Nights)
- 1935 El caballo del pueblo (The Favorite, as Bebe Viñas)
- 1935 The Soul of the Accordion (as Enrique)
- 1938 Jettatore
- 1938 La rubia del camino (as Count Ugolino Malipieri)
- 1938 Three Argentines in Paris (as Eleodoro López)
- 1939 Muchachas que estudian (College Girls, as Professor Castro)
- 1939 Divorce in Montevideo (as Goyena)
- 1939 El solterón
- 1939 Such Is Life (as Sr. Barreiro)
- 1940 Los muchachos se divierten
- 1940 Honeymoon in Rio (as Goyena)
- 1940 Marriage in Buenos Aires (as Goyena)
- 1940 Medio millón por una mujer
- 1941 Los martes, orquídeas (On Tuesdays, Orchids)
- 1941 Un bebé de París (as Andrés)
- 1942 El pijama de Adán (as Don Lucas)
- 1942 Locos de verano
- 1942 Noche de bodas (The Wedding Night)
- 1943 The Minister's Daughter
- 1945 Rigoberto
- 1946 Adán y la serpiente
- 1946 Deshojando margaritas
- 1946 No salgas esta noche
- 1948 La locura de Don Juan
- 1948 Novio, marido y amante
- 1949 Miguitas en la cama
- 1949 Un hombre solo no vale nada
- 1950 Don Fulgencio (as Don Fulgencio)
- 1950 ¿Vendrás a media noche?
- 1951 El complejo de Felipe
- 1951 La calle junto a la luna
- 1951 Martín pescador
- 1954 El Calavera
- 1956 Bendita seas (as Aniceto)
- 1956 El tango en París
- 1957 Mi marido y mi padrino (TV Series)
- 1960 Yo quiero vivir contigo
- 1963 The Games Men Play (as Musician)
- 1964 Cuidado con las colas
