= Rodolfo Sciammarella =

Argentine composer

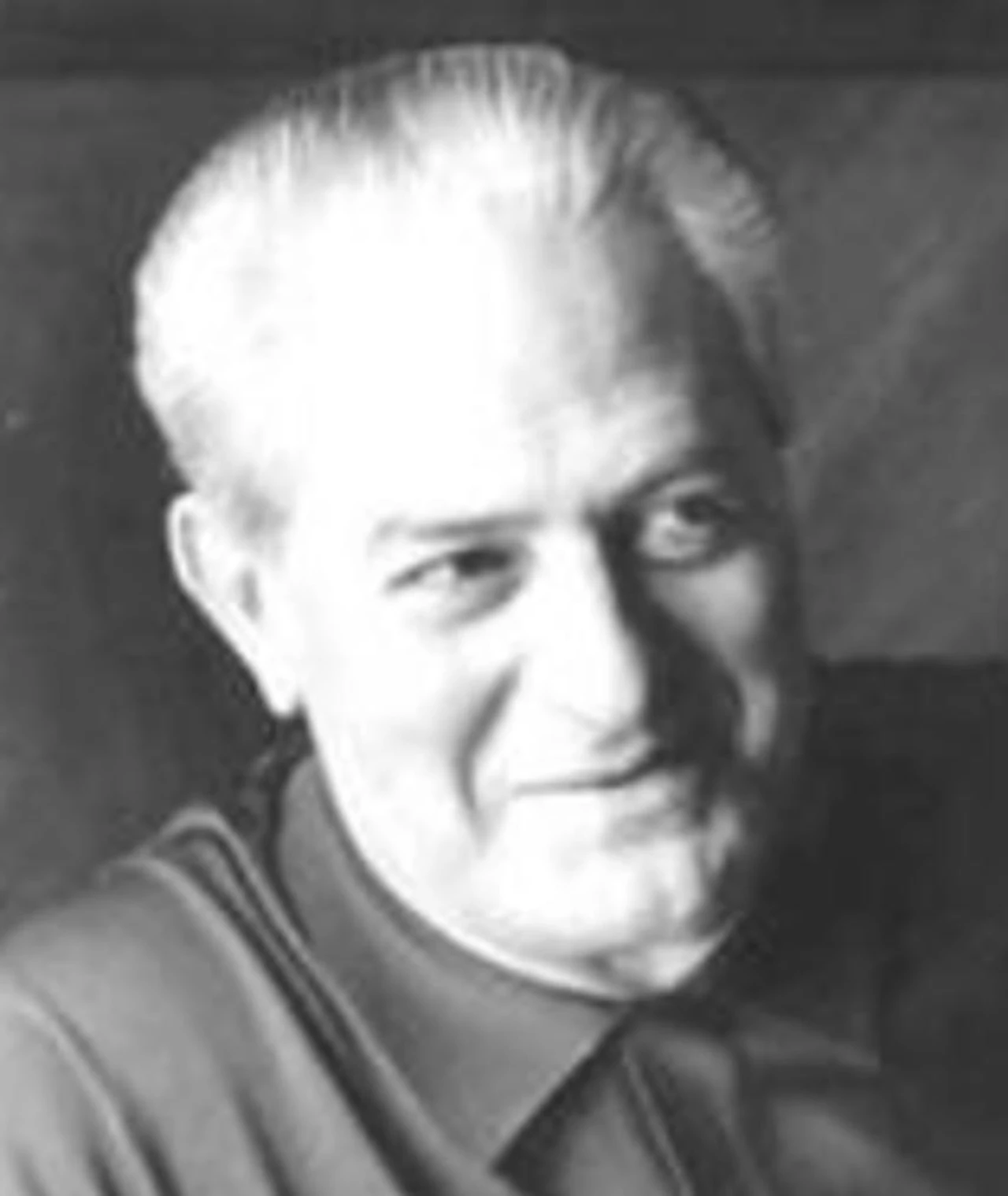
- Rodolfo Sciammarella
- Born: 8 October 1902; Buenos Aires, Argentina
- Died: 24 June 1973 (aged 70); Buenos Aires, Argentina
- Occupation: Composer
- Years active: 1933-1970 (film)

Rodolfo Sciammarella (1902–1973) was an Argentine composer who worked on many film scores during his career.

== Selected filmography ==
- Isabelita (1940)
- Un bebé de París (1941)
- Honeymoon in Rio (1940)
- The Tango Star (1940)
- Melodies of America (1941)
- Cristina (1946)
- The Tango Returns to Paris (1948)
- The Bohemian Soul (1949)
- Off to Havana I Go (1951)

== Bibliography ==
- Alberto Elena & Marina Díaz López. The Cinema of Latin America. Columbia University Press, 2013.
