= Enrique Roldán =

Argentine actor

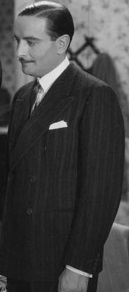
- Enrique Roldán in 1939
- Born: 1901; Argentina
- Died: 4 February 1954 (aged 52–53); Buenos Aires, Argentina
- Other name: Andres Garcia
- Occupation: Actor
- Years active: 1938-1953 (film)

Enrique Roldán (1901–1954) was an Argentine stage and film actor. He appeared in twenty four films during his career which spanned the Golden Age of Argentine Cinema. Roldán often played villains, particularly in the films of Manuel Romero.

== Selected filmography ==
- Isabelita (1940)
- Honeymoon in Rio (1940)
- I Want to Be a Chorus Girl (1941)
- You Are My Love (1941)
- The Three Musketeers (1946)
- Valentina (1950)

== Bibliography ==
- Finkielman, Jorge. The Film Industry in Argentina: An Illustrated Cultural History. McFarland, 24 Dec 2003.
