= Enrique Santos Discépolo =

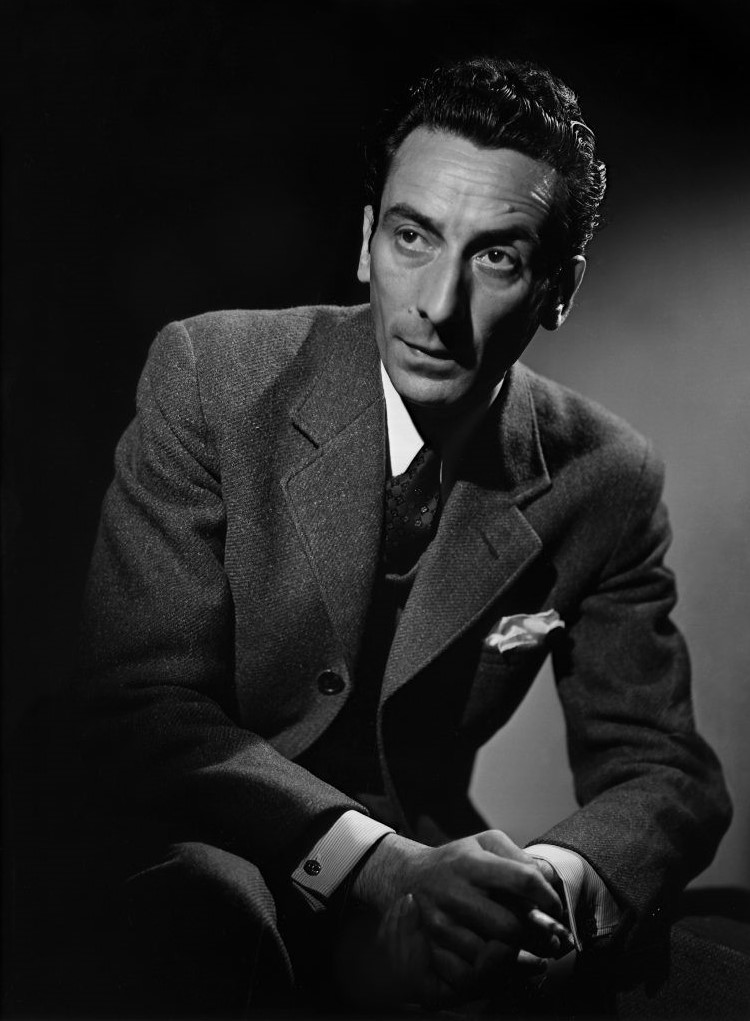

Background information
- Born: Enrique Santos Discépolo; 27 March 1901; Buenos Aires, Argentina
- Died: 27 December 1951 (aged 50) Buenos Aires, Argentina
- Genres: Tango, milonga
- Occupations: Musician, composer, songwriter
- Instruments: Piano, Bandoneón, vocals
- Years active: 1920s–1951
- Label: El Bandoneon

Enrique Santos Discépolo (Discepolín) (11 March 1901 – 27 December 1951) was an Argentine tango and milonga musician and composer, author of famous tangos like Cambalache and many others performed by several of the most important singers of his time, amongst them notably Carlos Gardel. He was also a filmmaker, actor and screenwriter.

== Life ==
Discépolo was born in Buenos Aires on 27 March 1901. He was devoted to the arts from an early age and tried acting and theatre writing, with moderate success, before finally dedicating himself to tango. Although his decision to write popular music was not unrelated from his previous exchanges with theatre and acting, his elder brother Armando resisted this move and therefore in the beginning things were not easy for Enrique. Armando had taken over his education after his parents died when Enrique was very young.

He wrote a few songs including the famous Que vachaché ("What Will You Do?") with little success until 1928, when singer Azucena Maizani performed his number Esta noche me emborracho ("I'm Getting Drunk Tonight"). Days after this performance, the tango's lyrics circulated across the nation and earned notoriety. Later that year, actress and singer Tita Merello rescued Que vachaché, and propelled it to the same popularity as Esta noche me emborracho. To finish a great year in 1928, he also met his partner, Tania, who would accompany him for the rest of his life.

He continued to gain fame the following years, and, in 1934, he wrote Cambalache, its lyrics not only describing the political climate of its era, but also nearly predicting its future. Cambalache is often quoted by Argentines regarding the extent to which its lyrics apply today.

Discépolo died from a heart attack on 24 December 1951.

== Style ==
Discépolo was versatile in his styling, having the ability to write songs that were ironic and moralistic, like Yira... yira..., Cambalache, romantic like Sueño de juventud, sarcastic (Justo el 31, Chorra), expressionist (Soy un arlequín, Quién más, quién menos), passionate (Confesión, Canción desesperada) and nostalgic (Uno, Cafetín de Buenos Aires).

His tango songs, as those of most other tango composers, make extensive use of lunfardo, thus making understanding his lyrics an exercise in patience for listeners unused to that dialect.

== Selected Songs ==
- Infamia ("Infamy")
- Que vachaché ("What Will You Do?")
- Yira... yira...
- Que sapa señor ("What's New, Sir?")
- Cambalache ("Junkshop")
- Sueño de juventud ("A Young Man's Dream")
- Justo el 31 ("Right on the 31")
- Chorra ("She-Thief")
- Soy un arlequín ("I Am a Harlequin")
- Quién más, quién menos ("Who More, Who Less")
- Confesión ("Confession")
- Canción desesperada ("Desperate Song")
- Uno ("One")
- Cafetín de Buenos Aires ("Buenos Aires Cafe")

== Selected filmography ==
Discépolo directed or co-directed a number of films:

- Four Hearts (1939)
- Caprichosa y millonaria (Petty and Millionaire) (1940)
- Un señor mucamo (1940)
- By the Light of a Star (En la luz de una estrella) (1941)
- Fantasmas en Buenos Aires (Ghosts in Buenos Aires (1942)
- Candida, Woman of the Year (1943)
- The Fan (1951)
