= Isabelita (film) =

1940 film

- Directed by: Manuel Romero
- Written by: Manuel Romero
- Starring: Paulina Singerman; Tito Lusiardo; Sofía Bozán
- Cinematography: José María Beltrán
- Edited by: Juan Soffici
- Music by: Rodolfo Sciammarella
- Production company: Lumiton
- Distributed by: Lumiton
- Release date: 31 July 1940
- Running time: 79 minutes
- Country: Argentina
- Language: Spanish

Isabelita is a 1940 Argentine comedy film directed by Manuel Romero and starring Paulina Singerman, Tito Lusiardo and Sofía Bozán during the Golden Age of Argentine cinema.

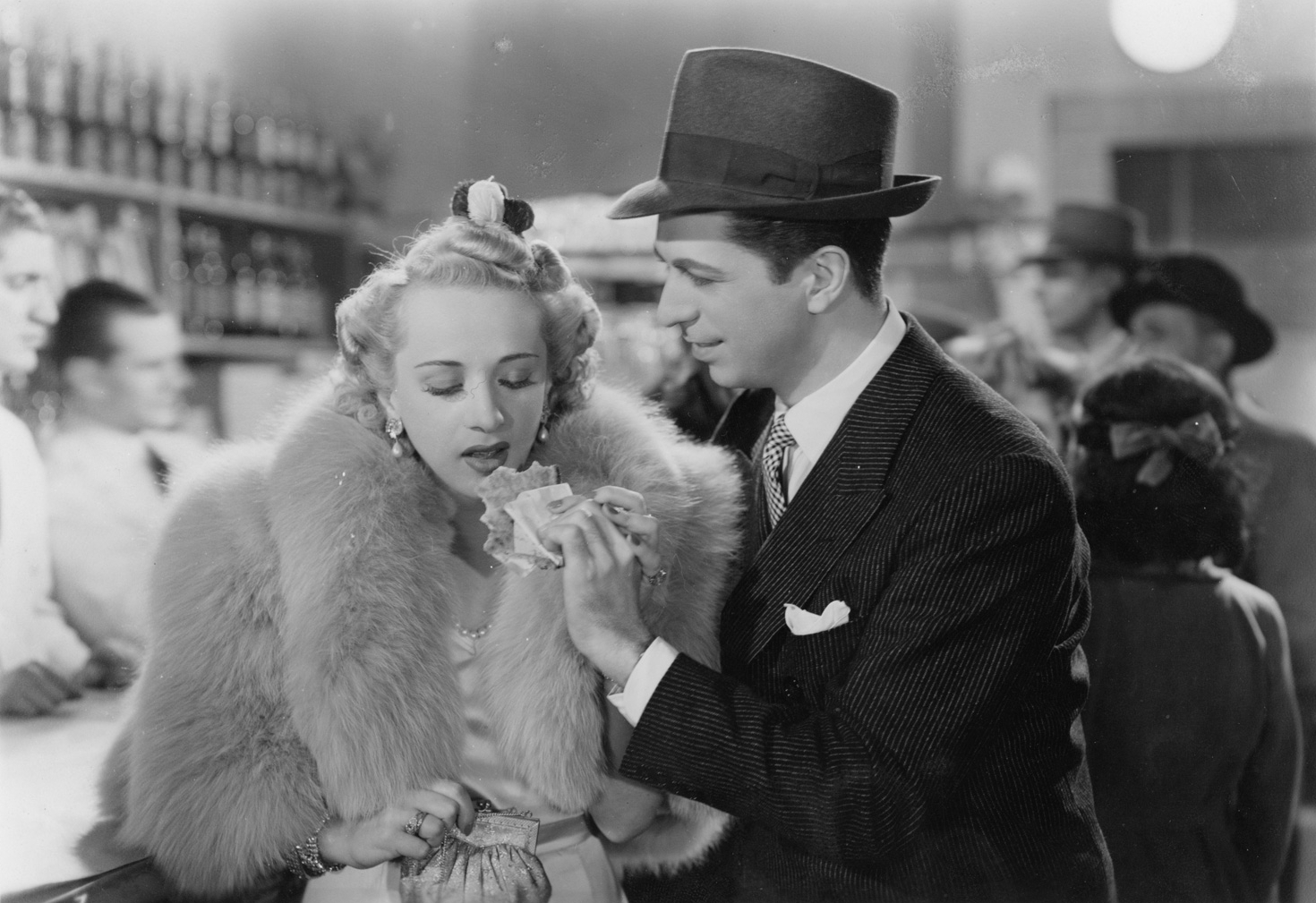
In this film, an aristocratic girl played by Paulina Singerman immerses herself in the working-class culture of Buenos Aires, with pizza being one of its defining aspects.

== Cast ==
- Paulina Singerman as Alcira García Méndez / Isabelita
- Tito Lusiardo as Galíndez
- Sofía Bozán as Elena
- Juan Carlos Thorry as Luciano Fuentes
- Enrique Roldán as Ricardo Pérez Rodríguez
- Carmen del Moral as Emma Fuentes
- Alberto Bello as Emilio García Méndez
- Roberto Blanco as Raúl García Méndez
- Mary Dormal as Dolores García Méndez
- Rosa Martín as Valentina's friend
- Alicia Aymont as Mrs. Pérez Rodríguez
- Adolfo Linvel as Jeweler

== See also ==
- List of works by Manuel Romero

== Bibliography ==
- Karush, Matthew B. Culture of Class: Radio and Cinema in the Making of a Divided Argentina, 1920–1946. Duke University Press, 2012.
