= List of Argentine films of 1931 =

A list of films produced in Argentina in 1931:

Argentine films of 1931
| Title | Director | Release | Genre |
A - Z
| Diez canciones de Gardel | Eduardo Morera | | Musical |
| Luces de Buenos Aires | Adelqui Millar | 23 September | Comedy |
| Muñequitas porteñas | José A. Ferreyra | 7 August | Drama, Comedy |
| Pancho Talero en Hollywood | Arturo Lanteri | 11 June | Comedy |
| Peludópolis | Quirino Cristiani | 18 September | Animated satire |
| Rosas de otoño | Eduardo Morera | | Musical |
| La vía de oro | Edmo Cominetti | 26 June | Political |
| Yira, yira | Eduardo Morera | | Musical |
