= Yira yira =

Yira Yira or variation, may refer to:

- Yira, yira, a 1931 Argentinian film
- "Yira... yira...", an Argentine song by Enrique Santos Discépolo
- "Yira Yira", a 2008 song from the album Caribe Gardel by Jerry Rivera

== See also ==
- Yira (disambiguation)
