= June Marlowe (Martha Jane Black) =

American actress and singer

- Marlowe in Casamiento en Buenos Aires (1940)
- Born: Martha Jane Black; 1918–1919; New York City, U.S.
- Other name: Martha Jane Davison
- Occupations: Actress; singer
- Years active: c. 1934–1947
- Known for: Her work during the Golden Age of Argentine and Mexican cinema
- Spouse(s): Tito Davison (m. 1936) Robin C. Black (m. 1950)

Martha Jane Black (born 1918 or 1919 in New York City), known professionally as June Marlowe, was an American actress and singer who worked in Spanish-language cinema in the 1930s and 1940s. She is sometimes confused with Gisela Valaria Goetten, a silent film actress who used the same stage name.

Marlowe worked as a jazz singer in the mid-1930s, first with Ted Fio Rito's orchestra and later at the Trocadero nightclub in Los Angeles, where she became a well-known figure of Hollywood nightlife. She also appeared in low-budget films, such as the western Riddle Ranch (1935). In early 1937, she travelled to Buenos Aires with the Chilean actor and director Tito Davison, whom she had secretly married, having been hired as a singer with Rudy Ayala's orchestra. In Argentina, she worked as an actress in La modelo y la estrella (1939), Gente bien (1939), Casamiento en Buenos Aires (1940), Peluquería de señoras (1941) and Melodías de América (1942), and took part in the Spanish-language dub of Pinocchio (1940). In Mexico, she starred in Chano Urueta's El corsario negro (1944). Her last known film is the American production Slave Girl (1947), by Universal Pictures, in which she had a minor role.

== Life and career ==
Marlowe photographed by Annemarie Heinrich for the Argentine magazine Radiolandia, 1939.

June Marlowe was born Martha Jane Black in New York City in 1918 or 1919. By 1934, she was singing with Ted Fio Rito's orchestra, with which she went on tour, and performed on Los Angeles radio. She also appeared at the Club New Yorker in the Hotel Christie, one of the best-known queer nightclubs of 1930s Hollywood, and performed as a solo act at the Fox Theatre in San Francisco. She became a well-known figure of Hollywood nightlife as a singer at the Trocadero, popular with its celebrity clientele. Before moving to Argentina, she appeared in low-budget films, such as the western Riddle Ranch (1935), an independent production by one of the small Poverty Row studios, in which she played Helen. In February 1937 she travelled to Buenos Aires, hired as a singer with Rudy Ayala's orchestra, who had met her while she was singing at the Trocadero. She arrived in Buenos Aires with the Chilean actor Tito Davison, who had worked on Metro-Goldwyn-Mayer's Spanish-language films and whom she had secretly married in Reno on 29 December 1936; after the wedding, the couple travelled to New York and sailed from there to the Argentine capital. With few job opportunities in Hollywood, the couple decided to explore new prospects in Argentina. Their son, Ricardo Alfredo Davison, was born in Buenos Aires on 31 March 1941.

Marlowe (left) with Alita Román and Marcelo Ruggero in Manuel Romero's La modelo y la estrella (1939).

In October 1938, the director Manuel Romero chose her for her Argentine film debut in La modelo y la estrella, his next film for the Lumiton studio. At the end of that month, Paulina Singerman, one of the film's leading actresses, abruptly abandoned the project, sparking a dispute with Lumiton that was widely covered in the press. Singerman claimed that she was contractually bound to the production company SIDE to film Retazo, but Lumiton denied this, and it was said unofficially that the actress had left the film because of Marlowe's beauty, which, according to the press, "stole the picture". After several months of suspended shooting, Romero replaced Singerman with Alita Román, a young rising actress, and the film premiered on 15 March 1939. Marlowe recalled the episode in 1944:

"I had the role of the 'star'," she tells us, "and Paulina seemed quite happy with that of 'the model'. Filming began, the first scenes were shot, and the film's producers and directors saw the first rushes. And then all hell broke loose! Paulina Singerman had a fit of nerves and flatly refused to go on working with me."

On the screen, in Paulina Singerman's opinion, June was too pretty and too full of charm. (...)

"The filming of La modelo y la estrella was suspended; they tried to come to an arrangement with Paulina Singerman," June continues, "but it was all in vain! And after four months of waiting, the film was finally shot, with Alita Román replacing Paulina."

Marlowe and Luis Sandrini in Luis Bayón Herrera's Peluquería de señoras (1941).

In April 1939, Marlowe had great success in her performances with the violinist Dajos Béla on Radio El Mundo, where she had also performed on her arrival in Buenos Aires. She appeared in two more films by Romero: Gente bien (1939), produced by EFA, and Casamiento en Buenos Aires (1940), by Lumiton. She also worked for EFA in Luis Bayón Herrera's Peluquería de señoras (1941), and in the Spanish-language dub of Walt Disney's Pinocchio (1940), recorded in Buenos Aires under the direction of Luis César Amadori. Her last film in Argentina was Melodías de América (1942), a musical directed by Eduardo Morera for Estudios San Miguel, starring the Mexican singer José Mojica and partly shot in Rio de Janeiro.

Around 1943, amid a crisis in the Argentine film industry caused by the shortage of raw film stock during World War II, Davison's contract in Argentina was cancelled, and the couple settled in Hollywood, where he was appointed Latin American consultant at 20th Century Fox. In her interview with Cine-Mundial, the journalist noted that Marlowe spoke with a porteño accent, and Marlowe said that during her five and a half years in Buenos Aires she had alternated film with theatre and radio, and had also performed in Santiago, Montevideo and Rio de Janeiro. Shortly afterwards she signed a contract with the Mexican production company Clasa Films, and travelled to Mexico earlier than planned to replace an actress who had fallen ill in El corsario negro, opposite Pedro Armendáriz.

In 1946, Universal Pictures announced her casting in Flame of Tripoli, eventually released as Slave Girl (1947), in which she played Mildred, a supporting role.

In 1950, she married Robin C. Black in Los Angeles.

== Filmography ==
- Riddle Ranch (1935)
- La modelo y la estrella (1939)
- Gente bien (1939)
- Casamiento en Buenos Aires (1940)
- Pinocchio (1940, voice in the Spanish-language dub)
- Peluquería de señoras (1941)
- Melodías de América (1942)
- El corsario negro (1944)
- Slave Girl (1947)

== See also ==
- Golden Age of Argentine cinema
- Golden Age of Mexican cinema
