= Don Pancho Talero =

Don Pancho Talero was a comic strip created by Argentinian cartoonist Arturo Lanteri, which centred on the family of a sailor named Don Pancho Talero. It appeared in the magazine El Hogar between 1922 and 1944. Three films were also created based on the character: Las aventuras de Pancho Talero (1929), Pancho Talero en la prehistoria (1930) and Pancho Talero en Hollywood (1931).
