= Goodbye Buenos Aires =

Adiós Buenos Aires
- Directed by: Leopoldo Torres Ríos
- Written by: Leopoldo Torres Ríos
- Produced by: Leopoldo Torres Ríos
- Starring: Tito Lusiardo; Amelia Bence
- Edited by: José Cardella
- Release date: 19 January 1938
- Running time: 85 minutes
- Countries: Argentina; Spain; Canada
- Language: Spanish

Adiós Buenos Aires (English language: Goodbye Buenos Aires) is a 1938 Argentine musical film directed and written by Leopoldo Torres Ríos. The film starred Tito Lusiardo and a 19-year-old Amelia Bence.

Released during the Golden Age of Argentine cinema, the film is a musical about tango dancing, an integral part of Argentine culture. The film followed on from Adiós Argentina another tango based musical released in 1930.

== Other cast ==
- Héctor Calcaño
- Antonio Capuano
- Delia Codebó
- Mario Danesi
- Floren Delbene
- Vicente Forastieri
- María Goicoechea
- Eduardo González
- Ernesto Lecuona
- Mario Mario as El guarda del Lacroze
- Lely Morel
- Esteban Serrador
- Ignacio Villa
- Ernesto Villegas
