= Francisco González Rodríguez (architect) =

Cuban architect and educator

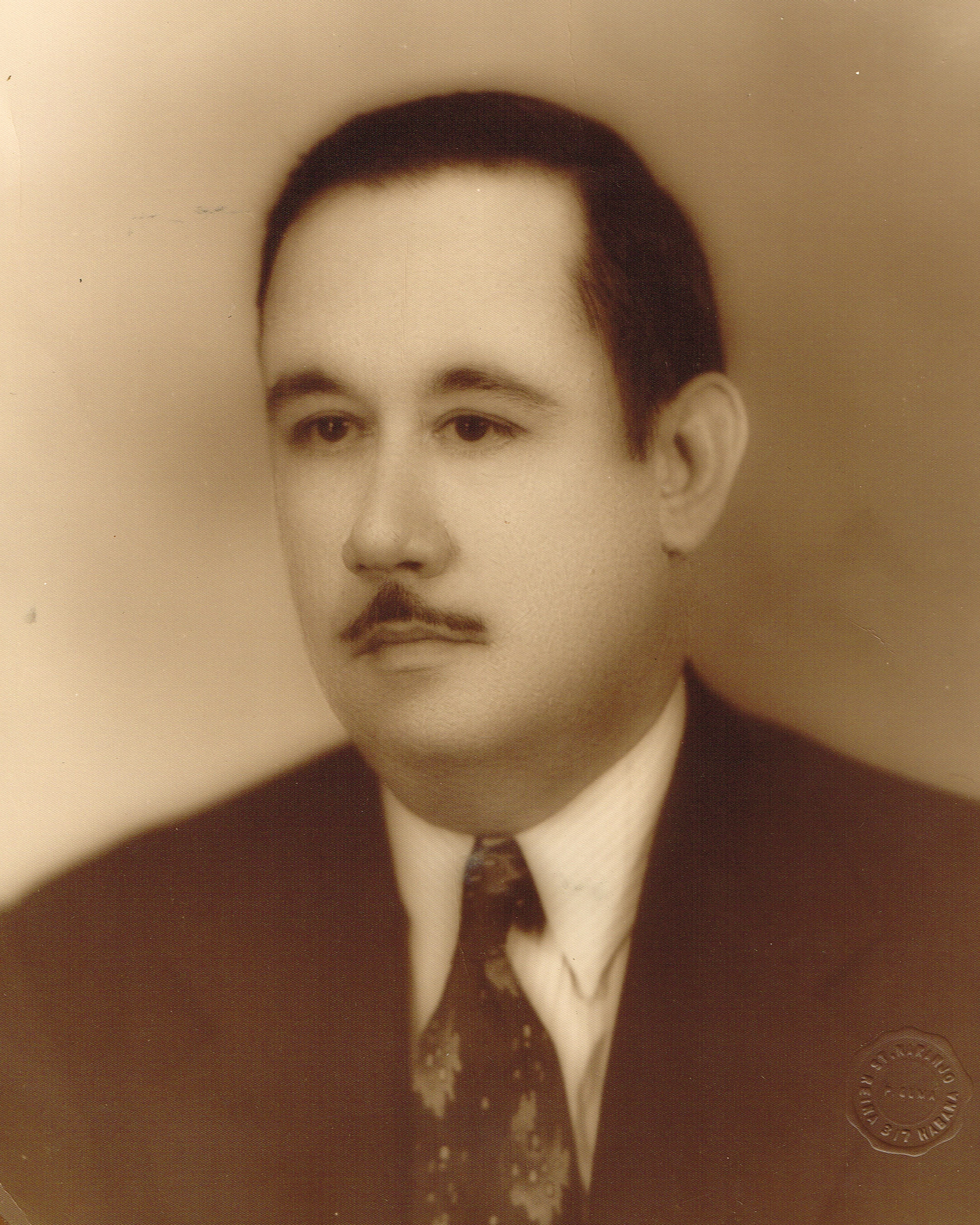
- González in 1936
- Born: April 26, 1898; Guanabacoa, Captaincy General of Cuba, Spanish Empire
- Died: November 28, 1947; Havana, Cuba
- Occupation: Dean of Architecture - University of Havana
- Spouse: Ana María Ortega Jiménez
- Children: 4

Francisco González Rodríguez (April 26, 1898 - November 28, 1947) was a Cuban architect. He became the youngest professor and the first Dean of Architecture at the University of Havana.

== Early life ==
Francisco González Rodríguez was born on April 26, 1898, in Guanabacoa, Cuba, to Pilar Rodríguez Alcain, from Ronda de Málaga, Spain, and to Narciso González Varo, from Vejer de la Frontera, in Cádiz province, Spain. He was the oldest son, second child out of eight children his parents had.

He grew up in Guanabacoa and attended Escuelas Pias of Guanabacoa, a Catholic school which covered both grammar school and high school. Upon his high school graduation in 1914, he was accepted to the School of Architecture of the University of Havana. At that time, Architecture was not a separate faculty but part of the faculty of Science, which also included Engineering. He graduated in 1920 with degrees both in architecture and civil engineering. In October 1920 he won a scholarship (known as Premio Extraordinario "Beca de Viaje") for further studies at MIT in Boston, MA. Unfortunately, the government of Cuba, which was responsible for paying his tuition, cancelled the scholarship after one year, and Francisco returned to Havana as his family could not provide the tuition money.

== Career at the University of Havana ==
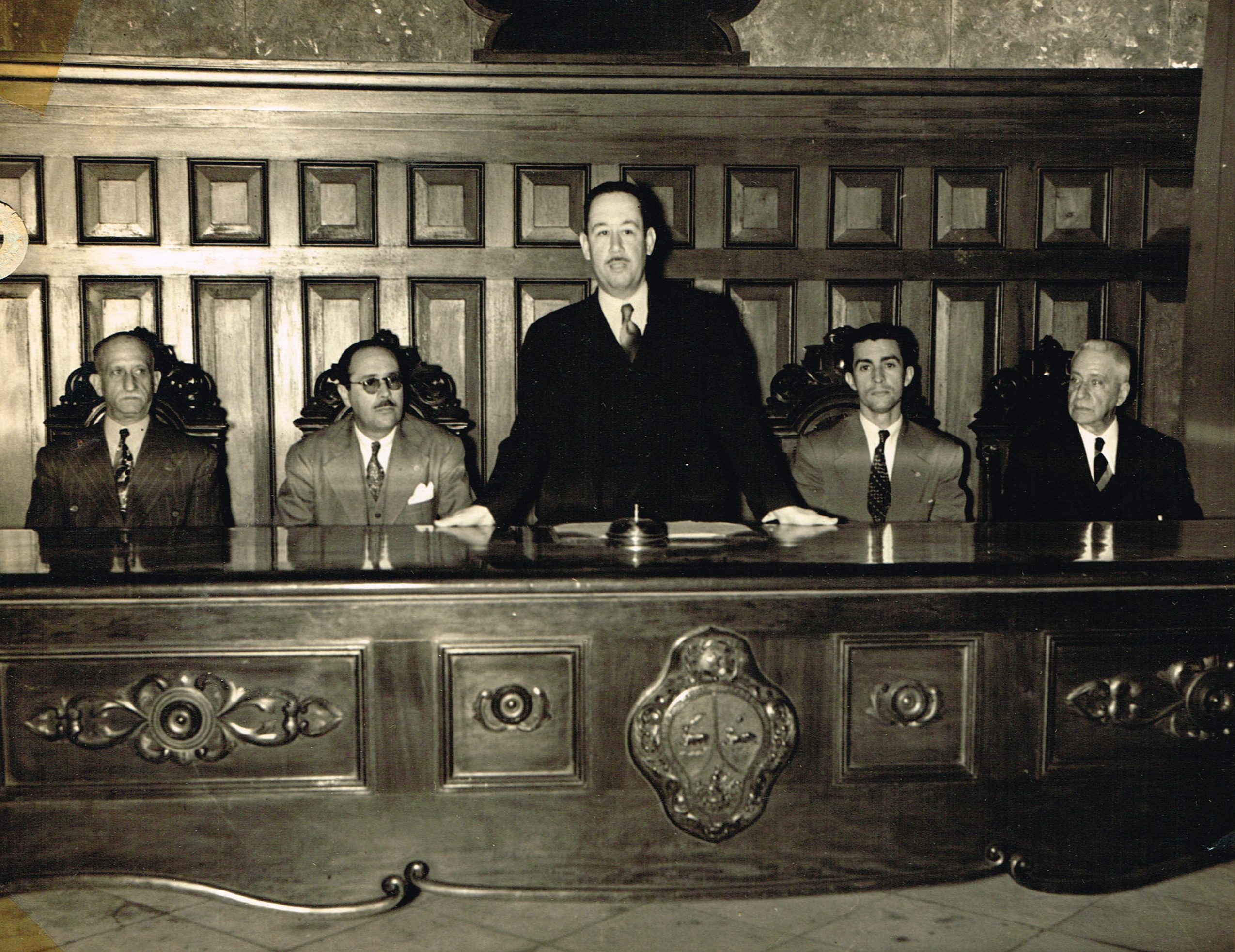
First day of Francisco González as Dean of the School of Architecture

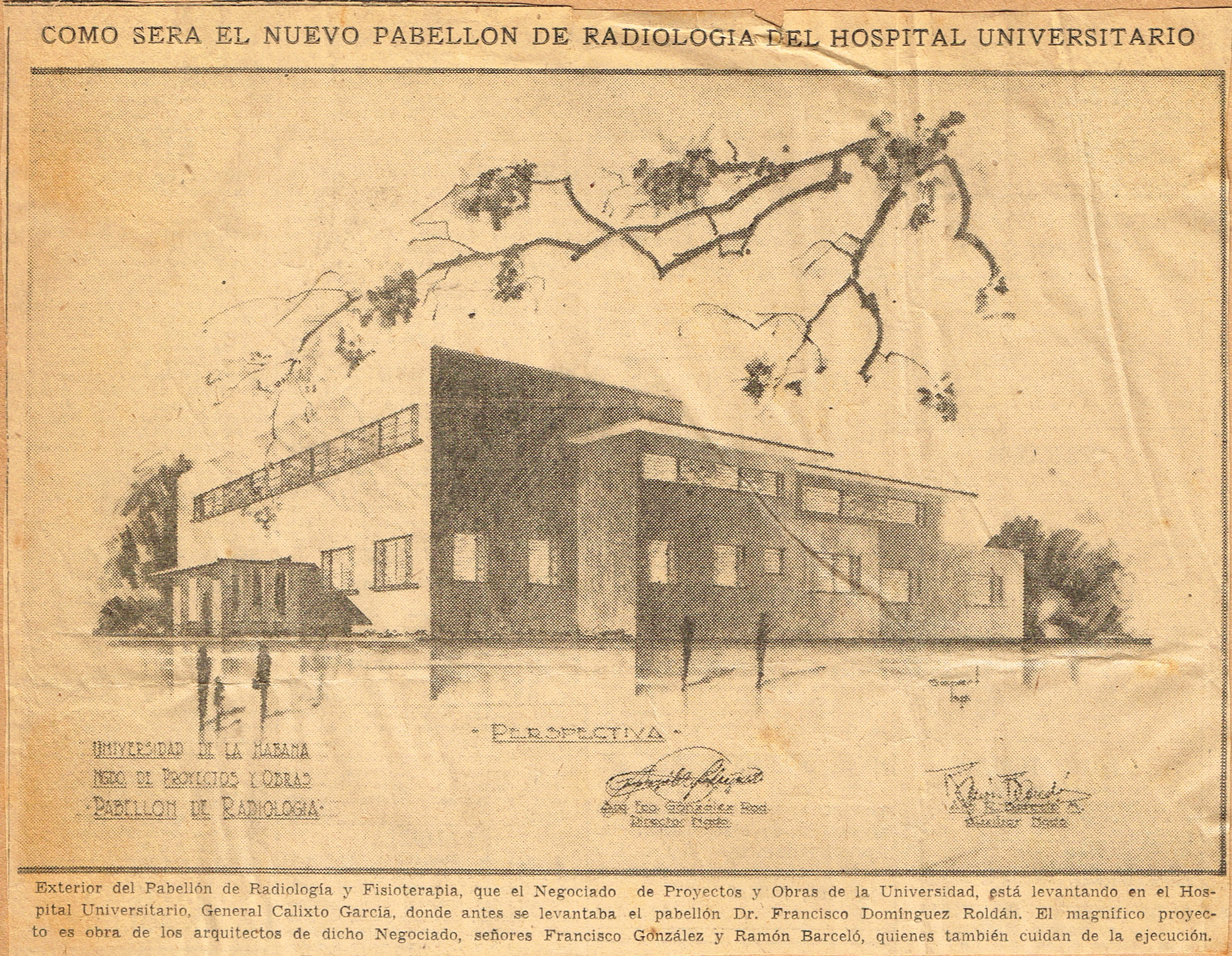
Pavilion of Radiology and Physical Therapy

Back in Havana, he applied for a job as professor of Architectural Design (which covered the training in drawing for the first two years of the architecture program). He was selected for the position and at that time he became the youngest professor in the University of Havana. At some point in the next few years (May 1934), Francisco González became Dean (decano) of the School of Letters and Science. When Architecture and Engineering separated on its own (1937) he became Dean of Engineering and Architecture and, in April 1938, became the first Dean of Architecture.

As González was also Director of a department called "Proyectos y Obras de la Universidad de La Habana", (Projects and Works of the University of Havana) most of his projects were done within the premises of the University of Havana, like the Pavilion of Radiology and Physical Therapy, done in conjunction with architect Ramón Barceló. Also, the building for the School of Pedagogy and Philosophy at the University of Havana, and the redesign and remodeling of the Quinta de Los Molinos a botanical garden owned by the University of Havana. Some of his projects outside the University of Havana were the Obelisk of Marianao and the apartment building in the corner of 18th and 19th streets in the Vedado neighborhood.

Francisco González Rodríguez married Ana Maria Ortega and had four daughters. He died on November 28, 1947 at the age of 49 due to appendicitis and peritonitis. At that time Dr. Felipe Gómez Albarrán became the next Dean of the School of Architecture.
