= David Blis =

Cuban activist (1872–1942)

David Blis (originally Blissnianski, Bliznianski; 1872–1942) was a Polish-born Jew, who emigrated to the Americas. He was born in Grodno, Poland (now Belarus), and married his Chilean-born wife, a Sephardic Jew, in Argentina in 1906. He emigrated from Mexico to Cuba in 1913. This was a time when many people left Mexico due to the Revolution of 1912.

Blis was strongly Zionist in orientation, vehemently anti-socialist and anti-Communist, and identified himself as a Reform Jew, having studied in Reform rabbinical seminaries in Berlin and Cincinnati. He had affiliated himself with the United Hebrew Congregation, but he also accepted honorary membership in the Sephardic Chevet Ahim Synagogue and in the Centro Israelita (from which he was expelled for “irregular” behavior).

In 1916, David Blis suggested to United Hebrew Congregation (UHC) president Jacob D. Barker that the young men of the community form a club. At the conclusion of Rosh Hashanah services held at the Hotel Plaza, Barker proposed to the UHC membership that the plan to form a club be implemented. On 1 October 1916, ten young men met at the home of Charles Berkowitz; they organized the Young Men's Hebrew Association of Cuba (YMHA) at Calle Obispo No. 97 in Habana Vieja. The effort failed within a year or two.

Blis was the primary motivator behind the resolution of the Cuban Senate formally supporting the Balfour Declaration in a vote on 30 April 1919. He died in Havana, Cuba in 1942 and is buried in the Guanabacoa cemetery.
