= Viejo smoking =

1930 film

- Directed by: Eduardo Morera
- Written by: Enrique Pedro Maroni
- Produced by: Federico Valle
- Cinematography: Antonio Merayo
- Music by: Guillermo D. Barbieri
- Release date: 1930
- Country: Argentina
- Language: Spanish

Viejo smocking (English title: Old dinner jacket) is a 1930 Argentine short musical film directed and written by Eduardo Morera, based on a play by Florencio Chiarello. It stars Carlos Gardel and Inés Murray.

== Cast ==
- Carlos Gardel as El inquilino
- Inés Murray as Manuela
- César Fiaschi as El amigo
- Francisco Canaro
