= La vía de oro =

1931 film

- Directed by: Edmond E. Cominetti
- Written by: Arturo S. Mom
- Produced by: Arturo S. Mom
- Release date: 1931
- Country: Argentina
- Language: Spanish

La vía de oro is a 1931 Argentine film directed by Edmond E. Cominetti and produced and written by Arturo S. Mom.

== Cast ==
- Lidia Arce
- Alejandro Corvalán
- Carlos Dux
- Felipe Farah
- Nedda Francy
- Alberto Lliri
- Clara Milani
- Damián Méndez
- Carlos Nahuel
- Pablo Cumo
