= Ray Gallagher =

American actor (1885–1953)

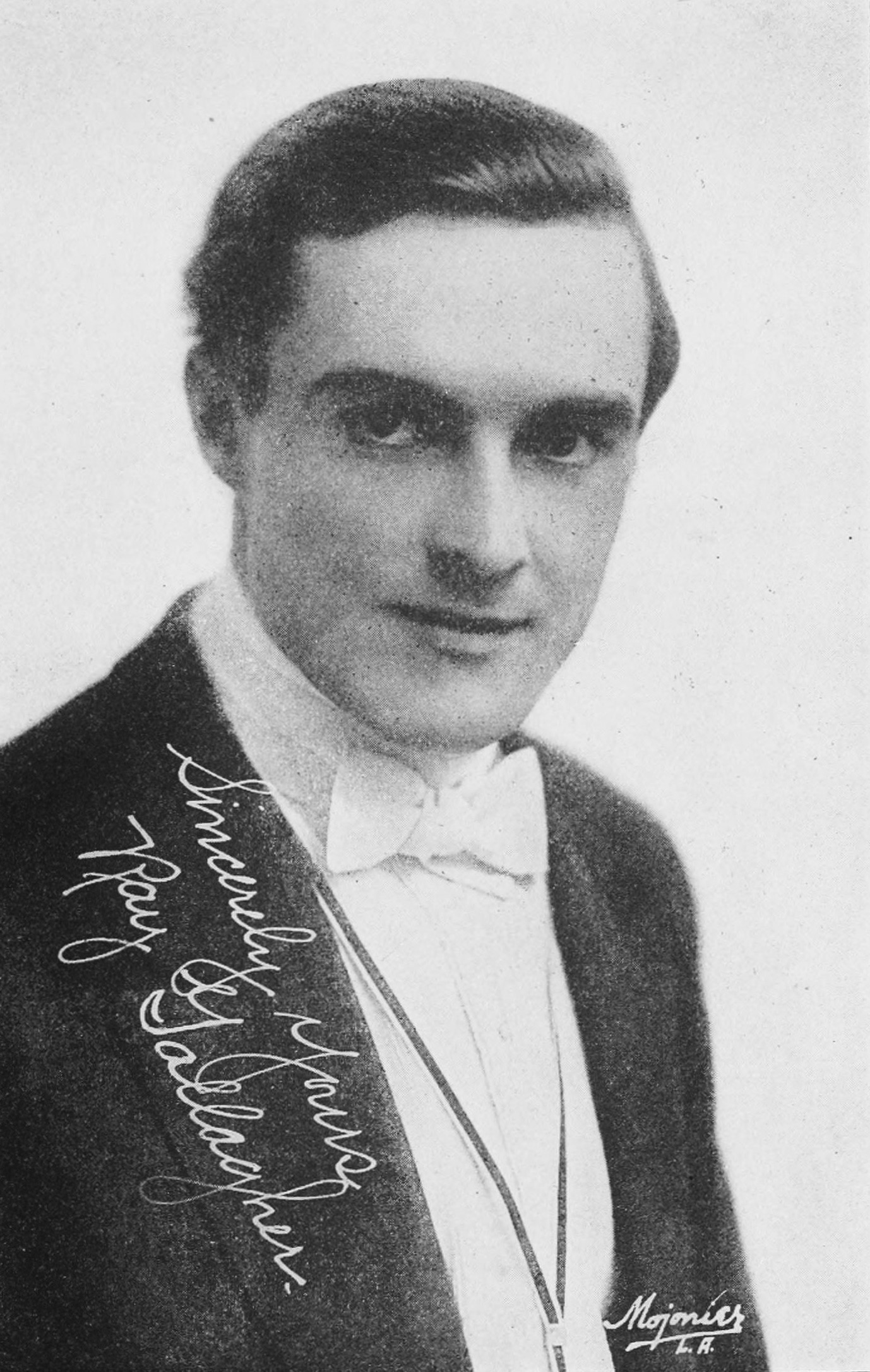
- Gallagher in 1915
- Born: April 17, 1885; San Francisco, California, US
- Died: March 6, 1953 (aged 67); Camarillo, California, US
- Occupation: Actor
- Years active: 1912–1936

Ray Gallagher (April 17, 1885 – March 6, 1953) was an American actor of the silent era. He appeared in more than 90 films between 1912 and 1936. He appeared in many productions at Universal. He was born in San Francisco, California and died in Camarillo, California from a heart attack.

== Partial filmography ==
- The Prisoner's Story (1912)
- Judgment of the Sea (1912)
- Her Boy (1913)
- Her Life's Story (1914)
- Maid of the Mist (1915)
- The Grind (1915)
- Wanted: A Leading Lady (1915)
- The Trail of '98 (1928)
- Half a Bride (1928)
- Sinners' Holiday (1930)
- Riddle Ranch (1935)
- Song of the Trail (1936)
- Desert Guns (1936)
