= Yira, yira =

1931 film

- Directed by: Eduardo Morera
- Release date: 1931
- Country: Argentina
- Language: Spanish

Yira, yira is a 1931 Argentine film directed by Eduardo Morera.
