= Así te quiero =

1942 film

- Screenshot
- Directed by: Edmo Cominetti
- Written by: Eifel Celesia; Tito Insausti
- Produced by: Edmo Cominetti
- Starring: Tito Lusiardo; Carlos Morganti
- Cinematography: Gumer Barreiros
- Edited by: Gerardo Rinaldi
- Music by: Lucio Demare
- Release date: 18 February 1942
- Running time: 86 minutes
- Country: Argentina
- Language: Spanish

Así te quiero is a 1942 Argentine romantic drama film of the Golden Age of Argentine cinema, directed by Edmo Cominetti and written by Eifel Celesia and Tito Insausti. The film starred Tito Lusiardo and Carlos Morganti.

== Cast ==
- Roberto Blanco
- Angel Boffa
- Antonio Capuano
- Max Citelli
- Mecha Cobos
- Ada Cornaro
- Elda Dessel
- Carlos Dux
- Fausto Etchegoin
- Ramón Garay
- Antonio Gianelli
- Mecha López
- Ángeles Martínez
- José Ruzzo
- Oscar Villa
- Ernesto Villegas
