= YIRA =

Yira or YIRA may refer to

- Yira language (ISO 639 code: nnb) a Bantu language
- Yale International Relations Association (YIRA), a Yale University student organization
- Yira (1956 novel) novel by Corín Tellado

== See also ==
- Yira yira (disambiguation)
