= Half a Bride =

1928 film

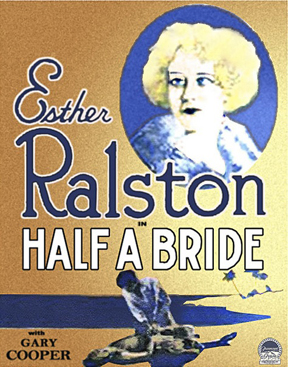
- Theatrical release poster
- Directed by: Gregory La Cava
- Written by: Doris Anderson; Percy Heath; Julian Johnson (titles)
- Based on: "White Hands" by Arthur Stringer
- Produced by: Jesse L. Lasky; Louis D. Lighton; Adolph Zukor
- Starring: Esther Ralston; Gary Cooper; William Worthington
- Cinematography: Victor Milner
- Edited by: Verna Willis
- Production company: Paramount Pictures
- Distributed by: Paramount Pictures
- Release date: June 16, 1928 (USA)
- Running time: 67 minutes 7 reels, 6,238 ft
- Country: United States
- Languages: Silent; English intertitles

Half a Bride is a 1928 American silent romance film directed by Gregory La Cava and starring Esther Ralston, Gary Cooper, and William Worthington. Based on the short story "White Hands" by Arthur Stringer, and written by Doris Anderson, Percy Heath, and Julian Johnson, the film is about an impulsive thrill-seeking heiress who announces to her father that she entered into a "companionate marriage" with one of her party friends. After her father abducts her aboard his private yacht and sails away, she escapes in a small boat and after a storm ends up on a desert island along with the yacht's young captain who followed after her. Half a Bride was released on June 16, 1928, by Paramount Pictures in the United States.

Half a Bride received generally good reviews upon its theatrical release, with one reviewer called it "a clever, entertaining picture".

== Plot ==
Patience Winslow (Esther Ralston) is an impulsive thrill-seeking heiress who spends most of her time going from one wild party to another. One night after attending several parties, she smashes her car and spends the rest of the night in jail. The following morning, she comes home and announces to her father (William Worthington) that she just entered into a trial marriage with one of her party companions, a much older man. Concerned about her well-being, her father abducts her aboard his private yacht and sets sail in order to prevent the ill-advised marriage.

Angered by her father's actions and determined to escape, Patience arranges for a motor boat to be lowered to the water and she soon takes off across the waves. Captain Edmunds (Gary Cooper), the young skipper of the yacht, follows after her in another motor boat. After catching up to her, Edmunds makes a daring leap into her boat. Just then a storm engulfs the small boat and the helpless couple end up swept ashore and marooned on a desert island in the Pacific.

Filled with fashionable notions she learned from popular radio dramas, Patience insists that she and Edmunds enter into a "companionate marriage" (in name only) and live together as a couple, but without the sexual entanglements. Edmunds agrees, and for three months they live out this "civilized" arrangement. Over time, however, Patience grows to love the young captain who in turn develops feelings for her. About to declare his love for her, Edmunds reconsiders because of her past actions, despite her insistence that she is no longer the spoiled thrill-seeker she once was.

One day they spot a ship which comes to rescue them. After returning to civilization, the young captain wished Patience well, now that she is back among her wealthy friends. Later that night, however, as Edmunds prepares to set sail, Patience returns to him with a minister in tow. Realizing that Patience has changed and that her feelings for him are sincere, Edmunds and Patience are married.

== Cast ==
- Esther Ralston as Patience Winslow
- Gary Cooper as Captain Edmunds
- William Worthington as Mr. Winslow
- Freeman Wood as Jed Sessions
- Mary Doran as Betty Brewster
- Guy Oliver as Chief Engineer
- Ray Gallagher as Second Engineer

== Production ==
Half a Bride is based on the short story "White Hands" by Arthur Stringer, first published in The Saturday Evening Post on July 30, 1927 (volume 200).

== Preservation status ==
The Silent Era website lists the film's survival status as "unknown". Film historian Arne Andersen places it on his list of lost films.

== Critical reception ==
The Evening Review applauded Ralston's performance in the film, oberseving, "When Esther Ralston gives herself to interpreting a part, the audience is assured of a faithful and absorbing Interpretation."

The Rochester Evening Journal called the film "a sure cure for jaded movie appetites". The Evening Independent called it "a clever, entertaining picture". The San Jose News described the film as "a frank and entertaining treatment of the now important marriage problem ... gives to the screen one of the greatest epics of all times". Photoplay magazine called the film "good entertainment". Motion Picture magazine wrote, "Gary Cooper is at his best and Esther Ralston is particularly winning."

Less impressed with the film, the Montreal Gazette described Half a Bride as "a rather familiar story told with none too great originality and lacking almost entirely the element of suspense."
