= Pancho Talero en Hollywood =

1931 film

- Directed by: Arturo Lanteri
- Release date: 1931
- Country: Argentina
- Language: Spanish

Pancho Talero en Hollywood is a 1931 Argentine film directed by Arturo Lanteri and starring Pepito Petray.

== Synopsis ==
Pancho Talero's daughter wins a trip to Hollywood as a prize in a beauty contest.

== Production ==
Pancho Talero en Hollywood was one of a series of films featuring Don Pancho Talero, a character created by cartoonist Arturo Lanteri. The previous two films were Las aventuras de Pancho Talero (1929) and Pancho Talero en la prehistoria (1930). Both of these had been silent films, but with Pancho Talero en Hollywood, director Arturo Lanteri moved into sound film. The film was produced at the Sociedad Impresora de Discos Electrofónicos (S.I.D.E.) Studios.
