= Lely Morel =

Argentinian actress

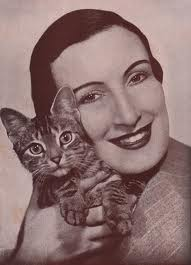
Lely Morel

Lely Morel (November 25, 1909 – December 29, 2013) was an Argentine vedette, singer and film actress of the Golden Age of Argentina cinema who was born in Buenos Aires. She also performed in Brazilian films.

== Filmography ==
- Así es el tango (1937)
- Adiós Buenos Aires (1938)
