= Riddle Ranch (film) =

1935 film

- Directed by: Charles Hutchison
- Written by: L.V. Jefferson; E.J. Thornton
- Produced by: Mitchell Leichter
- Starring: David Worth; June Marlowe (Note: Martha Black, not Gisela Goetten.); Julian Rivero
- Cinematography: Robert Doran
- Edited by: George Halligan
- Production company: Black King Productions
- Distributed by: Beaumont Pictures
- Release date: December 3, 1935
- Running time: 63 minutes
- Country: United States
- Language: English

Riddle Ranch is a 1935 American western film directed by Charles Hutchison and starring David Worth, June Marlowe, and Julian Rivero. It was made as an independent second feature on Poverty Row. It was primarily designed as a vehicle for the horse Black King, who gets top billing.

== Plot ==
Don Carlos, a Mexican outlaw, wants to get his hands on the horse Black King. To achieve this he rigs a horse race to cheat Black King's owner. That night, after being accused of dishonesty, he shoots dead another man with young Bob Horton's gun. Bob is then forced to flee across the border to Mexico as he is suspected of the killing.

== Cast ==
- Black King as Black King
- David Worth as Bob Horton
- June Marlowe as Helen
- Baby Charlene Barry as Young Betty
- Julian Rivero as Don Carlos
- Richard Cramer as Jim Riddle
- Art Felix as Henchman Pedro
- Fred 'Snowflake' Toones as Snowflake
- Henry Sylvester as Sheriff
- Budd Buster as Henchman Antonio
- Ray Gallagher as Deputy Tom

== Bibliography ==
- Fetrow, Alan G. . Sound films, 1927-1939: a United States Filmography. McFarland, 1992.
- Pitts, Michael R. Poverty Row Studios, 1929–1940: An Illustrated History of 55 Independent Film Companies, with a Filmography for Each. McFarland & Company, 2005.
