= Así es el tango =

- Screenshot
- Directed by: Eduardo Morera
- Written by: Florencio Chiarello (play); Eduardo Morera
- Produced by: Adolfo Z. Wilson
- Starring: Tita Merello; Tito Lusiardo
- Music by: Juan Carlos Cobián
- Distributed by: Cinematográfica Terra
- Release date: 1937
- Running time: 105 minutes
- Country: Argentina
- Language: Spanish

Así es el tango (English: Therefore it is The Tango) is a 1937 Argentine romantic drama film musical directed and written by Eduardo Morera, based on a play by Florencio Chiarello. Starring Tita Merello and Tito Lusiardo. Based on tango culture, it is a typical product of the Golden Age of Argentine cinema.

== Synopsis ==
Two deceived women plot revenge against their husbands. A composer is deceived by an adventurer whose girlfriend he falls in love with.

== Cast ==
- Olinda Bozán
- Tito Lusiardo
- Luisa Vehil
- Tita Merello
- Fernando Ochóa
- José Ramírez
- Eduardo Armani
- Olga Mom
- Lely Morel
- Carlos Enríquez
