= Melodies of America =

- Directed by: Eduardo Morera
- Written by: Francisco Chiarello; Ariel Cortazzo; Conrado de Koller
- Starring: José Mojica; Silvana Roth; June Marlowe; José Ramírez
- Cinematography: Mario Pagés
- Music by: Agustín Lara; Rodolfo Sciammarella
- Production company: San Miguel Films
- Release date: 1941
- Running time: 94 minutes
- Country: Argentina
- Language: Spanish

Melodies of America (Spanish:Melodías de América) is a 1941 Argentine musical comedy film of the Golden Age of Argentine cinema, directed by Eduardo Morera and starring José Mojica, Silvana Roth and June Marlowe. It was intended as an Argentine response to the Latin-American themed films produced by Hollywood as part of the Good Neighbor policy.

== Synopsis ==
A group of Argentine filmmakers struggle to make a film with a Panamerican theme. They eventually manage to raise the finances for the film and hire a famous Mexican singer to star in it. On the boat down he meets and falls in love with a poor woman from Buenos Aires. Meanwhile, an US American actress who has failed in Hollywood attempts to get a role in the production.

== Cast ==
- José Mojica
- Silvana Roth
- June Marlowe
- José Ramirez
- Armando Bó
- Carmen Brown
- Pedro Quartucci
- María Santos
- Bola de Nieve
- Ana María González
- Nelly Omar
- Juan Carlos Altavista
- Rafael Carret

== Bibliography ==
- Melgosa, Adrián Pérez. Cinema and Inter-American Relations: Tracking Transnational Affect. Routledge, 2012.
