= Evacuation of Spanish Florida (1763) =

The evacuation of Spanish Florida in 1763 occurred after the Seven Years' War. During the war, the British captured the Spanish colonies of Cuba and the Philippines. The Treaty of Paris signed on February 10, 1763 returned those colonies to Spain but gave Great Britain the Spanish colony of Florida. The treaty granted Florida residents the right to depart Spanish Florida without hindrance for a period of 18 months. The great majority of Floridians left, including a small number of Native Americans (Indians) and free (non-slave) black Africans, both of whom left voluntarily. In less than one year 3,095 residents of St. Augustine, the capital city of Spanish Florida, departed. All went to Cuba, except for 32 (or 33) who were sent to Campeche, Mexico. From Pensacola 775 additional people departed. Most of them were resettled near Veracruz, Mexico. Although the treaty gave the Floridians the right to continue to practice Catholicism, the fear of being dominated by British Protestants was one factor motivating the people of St. Augustine and Pensacola to leave Florida.

A few of the evacuees returned after Spain regained control of Florida in 1783.

== Evacuation of St. Augustine ==
The first three of about forty ships evacuating the population of St. Augustine left the city on April 8, 1763 and the last eight ships completing the evacuation left the town on January 9, 1674. The evacuation was orderly. The Spanish and Roman Catholic authorities packed up and shipped to Cuba government and church archives dating back to 1594. They loaded military supplies and cannons on the departing ships. The evacuees attempted to sell their property, but had few takers. The evacuees left behind 400 properties in St. Augustine. Nine persons were left behind to attempt to sell the houses and land to British buyers. A British citizen named Jesse Fish took up the task of marketing the properties, but sold only a few at rock-bottom prices. Fish, controversially, ended up the biggest landowner in Florida.

Evacuees to Cuba	Number
Soldiers and their families	1,916
Catalan fusiliers and their families	161
Canary Islands families	425
German Catholic families	26
Catholic Indians	89
Free blacks	23
Free pardos (mulattos)	76
Enslaved blacks	309
Convict laborers	38
Total	3,063

Additional evacuees from St. Augustine destined for Campeche totaled 32 or 33: 27 Spaniards and six slaves. Another fifty soldiers and eight wives and children were sent from St Augustine to the coastal fortress of San Marcos de Apalache. Their role there was to supervise the transfer of the fort to British control. They left Florida for Cuba in 1764 after the transfer was effected.

== Evacuation of Pensacola ==
Four Spanish ships, four British ships, and several purchased or chartered ships carried out the evacuation, leaving Pensacola on September 2, 1763, loaded with both the evacuees and their portable possessions, including military equipment. The British assessed the value of the 28 private properties in the colony outside the walls of the fort and they were sold to the British soldiers sent to Pensacola to supervise the evacuation. Some of the evacuees went to Havana, but the majority sailed to Veracruz, Mexico, called New Spain at that time.

Evacuees to Veracruz, Mexico and Cuba	Number
Soldiers and their families	249
Convicts	105
Civilians and families	271
Catholic Indians	108
Additional persons and families	42
Total	775

Source: Note: A misprint and the arithmetic in the cited source were corrected.

== Resettlement and return ==
Cuba had a population of about 80,000 people in the mid 18th century. The island was unprepared for the influx of 3,000-plus evacuees from Florida. Many of the Spanish families were initially quartered with families in Havana. The Indians were sent to a nearby village called Guanabacoa, a refuge for Indians since 1554. Free blacks, including black soldiers, and pardos were sent to the town of Regla.

In 1764, a wealthy landowner donated 108 caballerias (about 3,500 acres (1,400 ha) of land to the evacuees about 70 miles (110 km) from the provincial town of San Carlos de Matanzas and founded a community named San Augustin de la Nueva Florida. Eighty-three families of the evacuees settled there, including forty-three families of the Canary Islanders, mostly farmers. Others in the settlement consisted of thirteen Spanish families, four families of German Catholics, four pardo families, and nine families of free blacks who had previously been sent to Regla.

Each settler received a caballeria of land, sixty pesos, food, tools, and a black slave. The sixty pesos and the value of the black slave (150 pesos) was to be paid back to the government. Conditions were difficult, several evacuees were murdered by their black slaves. In 1766, only nineteen families remained on the land. Most families had moved to Havana, selling their land to the Canary Islanders, some of whom remained. The Canary Island origin of the community is still remembered in the 21st century town of Ceiba Mocha.

Little information exists concerning the fate of the evacuees to Veracuz, Mexico. In 1765, the Christian Indians among the evacuees, from the Yamassee and Apalachee tribes, were resettled in a new town called San Carlos de Chachalacas north of Veracruz. Only 47 of the 108 who had left Pensacola survived.

By Spanish law, widows and orphans of Florida soldiers received a pension of two reales per day (in current dollars an 18th century Spanish real is worth about six dollars) In 1770 the wives, widows, and unmarried daughters of men living in Florida at the time of the evacuation were granted a pension of one real per day. The pension was payable in both Cuba and Mexico. Spain regained possession of Florida in 1783 as part of the treaty concluding the American Revolution. In 1786, only 132 of the former evacuees had returned to Spanish-controlled Florida. In 1789, to encourage repatriation, the Spanish government decreed that the pension to women would be continued if they returned to Florida and that houses and land lost at the time of the evacuation could be recovered and returned to the original owners. In 1791, the policy was further liberalized with free transportation offered to evacuees who returned to Florida and the expansion of the pension scheme to encourage repatriation. People returning to Florida, however, were few. The pensions for evacuees continued until at least 1852 when three female evacuees were still alive and receiving a pension.

Evacuees had difficulties regaining their properties. During the last years of the American Revolution, up to 13,000 British loyalists fled the U.S. to Florida and staked their claims to property there. The reinstalled Spanish government in 1783 initially required that Florida residents profess Catholicism and some British Protestants left Florida as a result. The adjudication of conflicting claims proceeded at a glacial pace, many still unresolved when the United States gained ownership through purchase of Florida in 1821. Once again, many Spanish subjects departed Florida for other parts of the Spanish Empire.
