= Gente bien =

- Directed by: Manuel Romero
- Written by: Manuel Romero
- Produced by: Manuel Romero
- Starring: Hugo del Carril; Tito Lusiardo; Delia Garcés
- Cinematography: Antonio Solano
- Edited by: José Cardella
- Music by: Francisco Canaro; Juan d'Arienzo; Héctor Quesada; Tito Ribero; Alberto Soifer
- Distributed by: EFA
- Release date: 28 June 1939
- Running time: 85 minute
- Country: Argentina
- Language: Spanish

Gente bien is a 1939 Argentine musical film of the Golden Age directed by Manuel Romero. The tango film premiered in Buenos Aires on June 28, 1939 and the United States on October 8, 1939 and starred Hugo del Carril, Tito Lusiardo and Delia Garcés.

The score was composed by Francisco Canaro and Tito Ribero.

== Cast ==
- María Armand
- Amalia Bernabé
- María Esther Buschiazzo
- Miguel Caló
- Hugo del Carril
- Lucy Galián
- Delia Garcés
- Tito Lusiardo
- June Marlowe
- Ana May
- Nathán Pinzón
- Enrique Roldán
- Marcelo Ruggero

== See also ==
- List of works by Manuel Romero
