= María Argelia Vizcaíno =

María Argelia Vizcaino
- Birth name: María Argelia Vizcaino
- Born: 1955
- Origin: Guanabacoa, Havana, Cuba
- Occupation(s): Writer, historian, journalist, freelance consultant, graphic designer and television producer and screenwriter
- Years active: 1992–present

María Argelia Vizcaíno is a freelance writer of articles and reports that have been published in several languages. As well as publishing the books "Guanabacoa la Bella" and "Son y sazón" (Son and flavor) (Cuban), her works are mostly research and cover cultural issues. They are recommended by professionals, thanks to their seriousness. She is also a historian, journalist, freelance consultant, graphic designer and television producer and screenwriter. She also serves as public relations and event promoter.

Vizcaíno has founded various cultural groups in order to try to preserve the Cuban traditions and has won several literary competitions. It has been recognized and awarded by any prestigious institutions. She has focused especially in Hispanic publications.

== Biography ==
María Argelia Vizcaíno was born in 1955 in Guanabacoa, Havana, Cuba. She went into exile in the United States in 1980 fleeing the Castro regime, but never forgot the country of his birth, so most of his writings are dedicated to Cuba. Since January 1992, Vizcaíno wrote Estampas de Cuba (Cuba Stamps) in West West Palm Beach, which were published in numerous newspapers and magazines in many U.S. cities, such as "La Voz Libre" in Los Angeles (California), "Libre, Miami " (Free, Miami ) or "Estado Jardín" (Garden State) in Union City, New Jersey. Just as in foreign countries through the cyber world as is the case Peru, Ecuador, Mexico, Netherlands, Italy (translated into Italian) or Brazil translated into Portuguese), among others.

In 2001 she directed the program "La Hora Cubana", with the cooperation of Mr. José Luis Pérez transmitting each week for the radio station 1190 AM, Palm Beach County. Since 2008 she publishes a weekly online blog, "Faranduleando con María Argelia".

That year she and Yamilé Arencibia were the creators, writers and producers of the TV show "Cuba: Inolvidable" (Cuba: Unforgettable) in Mi Pueblo, TV channel; At the same time worked between June 2008 and January 2009 on "Pellízcame que estoy Soñando", broadcast on Channel 41, America teve, as the pre-interviewer.

== Written ==
In 2006 she published her first book entitled "Guanabacoa, la bella" (Guanabacoa the Beautiful), and March 12, Art Association and Cuban Culture of Palm Beach County was Indeed his presentation at the Don Ramón de Dixie Hwy (Don Ramon Restaurant of Dixie Hwy), in the city of West Palm Beach, becoming the first Hispanic woman in Palm Beach that published a book of history, officially classified as a historian. On November 20, 2010 was invited by the Editorial Voces de Hoy (Voices Today) for participate in the Miami Book Fair International, with her new book Son y sazón (Son and then) (Cuban). The book was officially launched on Saturday, December 18, 2010 at the headquarters Municipalities of Cuba in Exile of the city of Miami, with the participation of artistic and intellectual figures who collaborate with it to make its Favorite Recipe Cuban cuisine and biography. Vizcaíno was also invited by Maria Ninoska, Perez Castellon and Mirta Iglesias to participate in her book "Cuba Mía – Hablan Tus Hijos" (Cuba Mia – Speak Your Children), which includes testimonies of more than two hundred people like Celia Cruz, Willy Chirino or Emilio Estefan, She has shared his work in the publishing of newspapers and magazines of graphic designer from the same also for cultural programs, concerts music, and the covers of his own.

== Activism ==
She organized along with Elaine Fandino the first mass protest takes place in West Palm Beach against the arbitrary policy implemented by President Bill Clinton retaining the Cuban boat people indefinitely in Guantanamo Bay, and performed alongside Amy Lopezand and a small group of family and friends, the first protest against the kidnapping of Elian force that generated after a huge demonstration which included the union of the Latin American brothers. In addition, Vizcaíno has volunteered for the League Against Cancer of Delegation of West Palm Beach.
