= Tito Lusiardo =

Argentine actor and singer (1896–1982)

- Born: September 13, 1896; Ferrol, Galicia
- Died: June 25, 1982 (age 85)

Tito Lusiardo (September 13, 1896 – June 25, 1982 in Buenos Aires) was a Spanish-born Argentine film actor and tango singer, notable for his work during the Golden Age of Argentine cinema.

== Life and career ==
Tito Lusiardo was born in Ferrol, Spain on September 13, 1896. Lusiardo began acting for film in 1933 and made some 50 film appearances as an actor.

He began appearing in tango films in the 1930s such as Idolos de la radio (1934), Así es el tango (1937), Adiós Buenos Aires (1938) and Así te quiero (1942).

In 1951 he appeared in the Cuban musical A La Habana me voy. He retired from the industry in 1969. He died in Buenos Aires on June 25, 1982.

== Filmography ==
1933 Dancing
1934 Idolos de la radio
1935 Tango Bar
1935 El día que me quieras
1936 Muchachada de a bordo
1937 Así es el tango
1937 La Vuelta de Rocha
1938 Adiós Buenos Aires
1938 Three Argentines in Paris
1938 Mujeres que trabajan
1938 Jettatore
1938 Pampa y cielo
1939 El Sobretodo de Céspedes
1939 Los Pagares de Mendieta
1939 Entre el barro
1939 Gente bien
1939 La vida es un tango
1940 Un Señor mucamo
1940 A Thief Has Arrived
1940 Isabelita
1940 Honeymoon in Rio
1941 Novios para las muchachas
1941 El Mozo número 13
1941 Hay que casar a Ernesto
1942 Así te quiero
1942 Elvira Fernández, vendedora de tiendas
1942 Ven mi corazón te llama
1943 La Calle Corrientes
1943 El Fabricante de estrellas
1947 Christmas with the Poor
1948 Los Secretos del buzón
1948 El Cantor del pueblo
1949 La Historia del tango
1950 El Morocho del Abasto: La vida de Carlos Gardel
1951 Cuando un pobre se divierte
1951 A La Habana me voy
1951 Con la música en el alma
1951 A Cuban in Spain
1954 El Cartero
1958 Del cuplé al tango
1964 Carlos Gardel, historia de un ídolo
1964 Cleopatra Was Candida
1964 Buenas noches, Buenos Aires
1967 La Cigarra está que arde
1967 La Muchachada de a bordo
1969 El Día que me quieras
