= Bola de Nieve =

Cuban singer-pianist and songwriter (1911–1971)

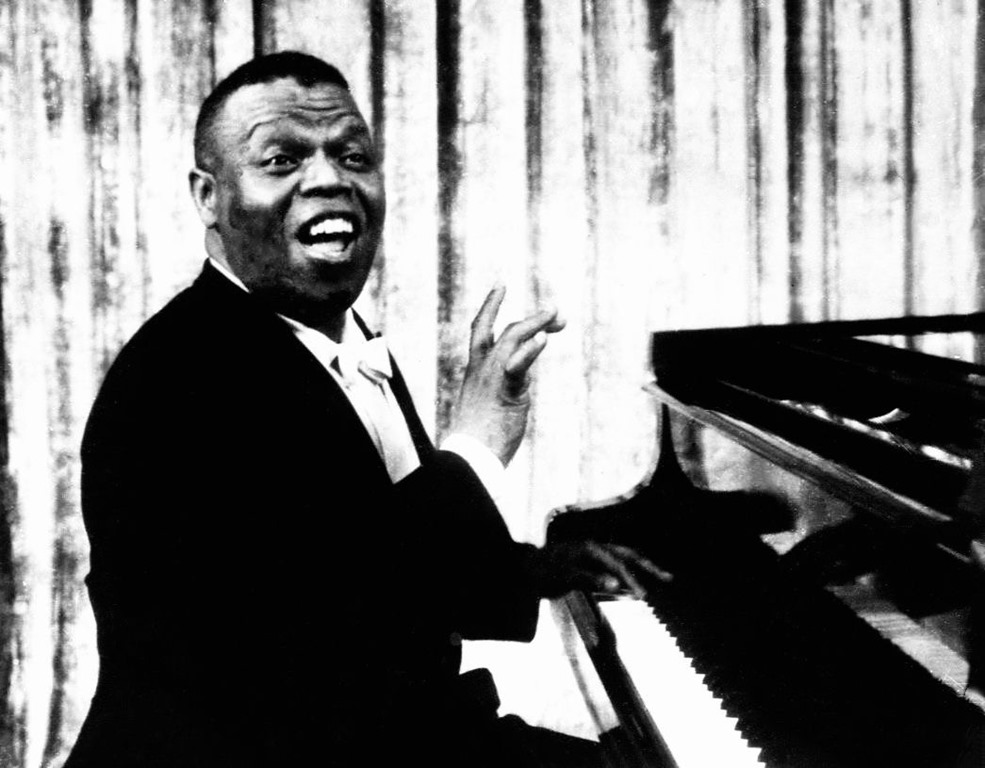
- Bola de Nieve, 1940s

Background information
- Born: Ignacio Jacinto Villa Fernández; 11 September 1911; Guanabacoa, La Habana, Cuba
- Died: 2 October 1971 (aged 60) Ciudad de México, Mexico
- Genres: Canción, bolero, habanera, son cubano
- Occupations: Singer, musician, composer
- Instrument: Piano
- Labels: Orfeón, Discmedi, RCA Victor Mexicana, Montilla, Sonotone, Kubaney, Modiner, Areito
- Formerly of: Orquesta CMQ

Bola de Nieve (literally Snowball; 11 September 1911 – 2 October 1971), born Ignacio Jacinto Villa Fernández, was a Cuban singer-pianist and songwriter. His name originates from his round, black face.

Villa Fernández was born in Guanabacoa, eastern Havana, where he studied at the Conservatorio de José Mateu. He worked as a chauffeur and played piano for silent films until his friend Rita Montaner took him on as an accompanist in the early 1930s. After Montaner returned to Cuba, Villa Fernández remained in Mexico and developed an original performance style as a pianist and singer. He was an elite rather than a popular figure, a sophisticated cabaret stylist known for ironic patter, subtle musical interpretation, with a repertoire that included songs in French, English, Catalan, Portuguese, and Italian. He toured widely in Europe and the Americas, and his friends included Andrés Segovia and Pablo Neruda. He was black and gay, and was self-confident in his personality, and accepted for what he was: a memorable talent.

He died in Mexico City during a musical visit.

He was the subject of a 2003 documentary which included interviews with fellow musicians, friends, relatives, and experts.

== Style ==
Fernández is one of the most influential figures of Afro-Cuban jazz. He often synthesized elements of European and North American musical traditions with Latin elements, which gave his music a sound distinct from his contemporaries.

His music is often deeply emotional, going as far as to openly sob his lyrics.

== Selected filmography ==
- Melodies of America (1941)
