= Arturo Lanteri =

Argentine cartoonist and film director (1891–1975)

- Born: 1891
- Died: 1975 (aged 83–84)
- Occupation(s): Cartoonist and film director

Arturo Lanteri (1891–1975) was an Argentine cartoonist and film director. As a comics artist he is best remembered for his series Les Aventuras de Negro Raúl, Don Pancho Talero and Anacleto.

== Filmography ==
Director

- Pancho Talero en Hollywood (1931)
- Pancho Talero en la prehistoria (1930)
- Las aventuras de Pancho Talero (1929)

Writer

- Pancho Talero en Hollywood (1931)
- Pancho Talero en la prehistoria (1930)
- Las aventuras de Pancho Talero (1929)

Producer

- Pancho Talero en Hollywood (1931)
- Pancho Talero en la prehistoria (1930)
