= Guanabacoa =

Distrito de Guanabacoa
- District
- Guanabacoa
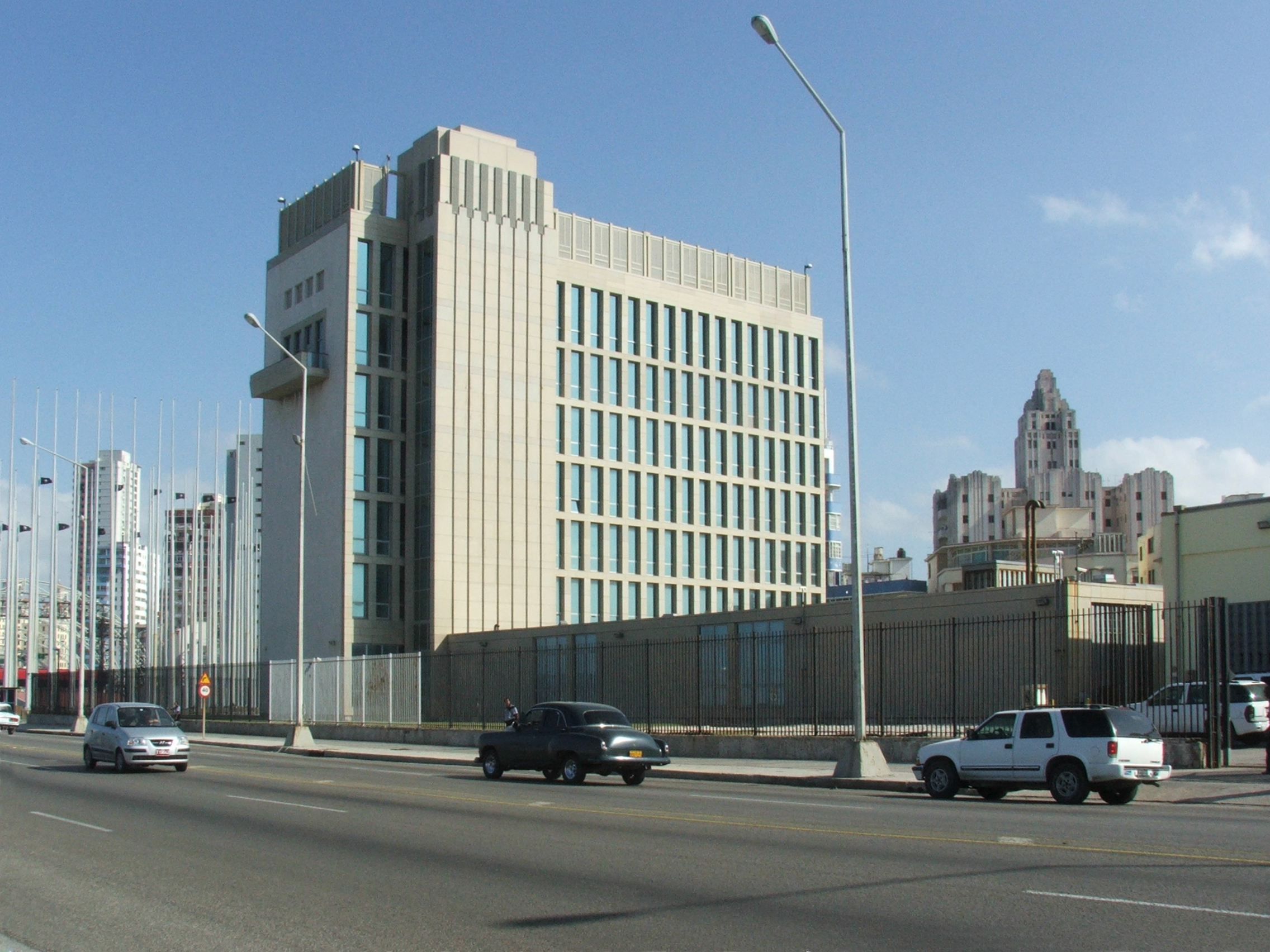
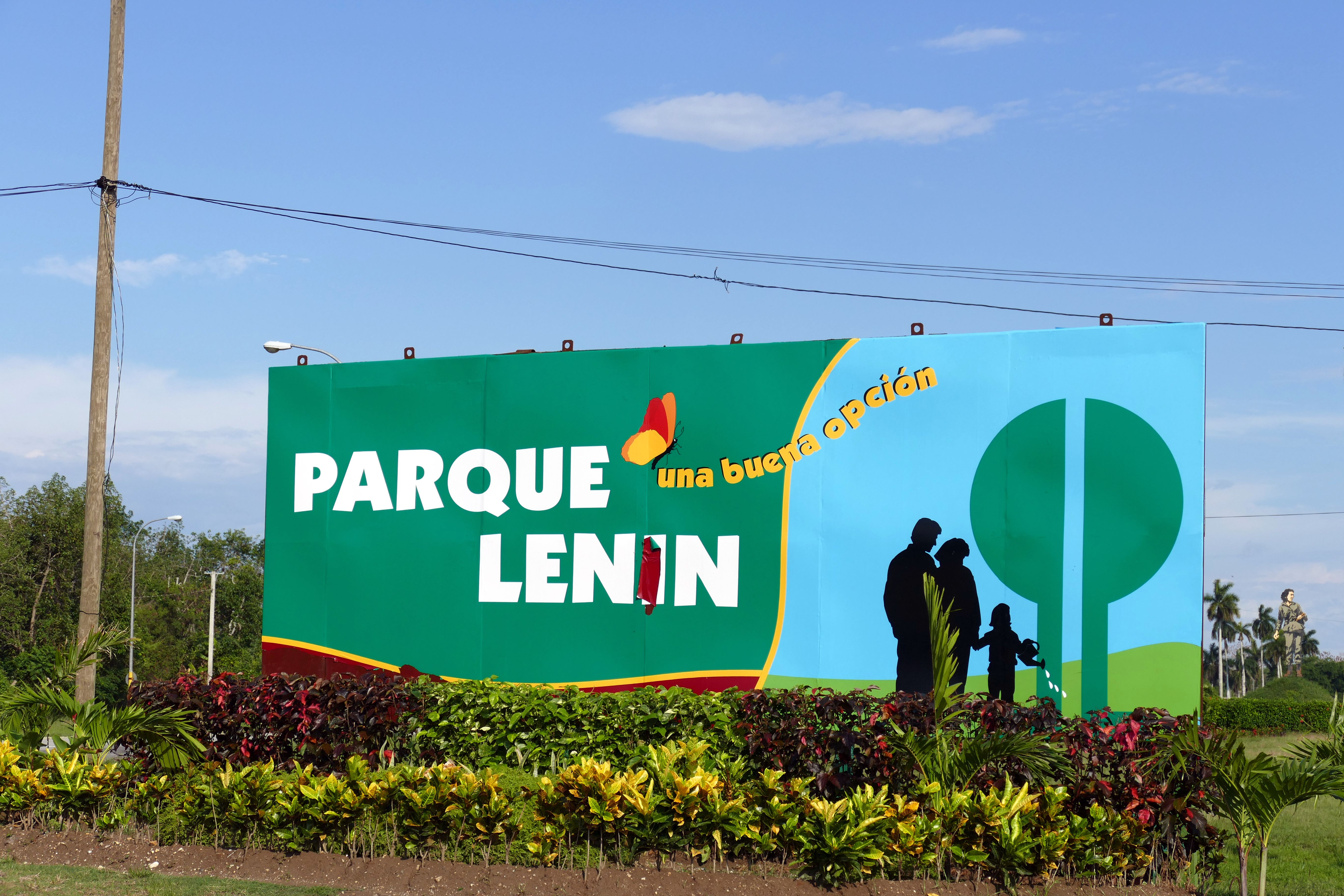

- Flag Coat of arms
- Nickname: Villa de Pepe Antonio
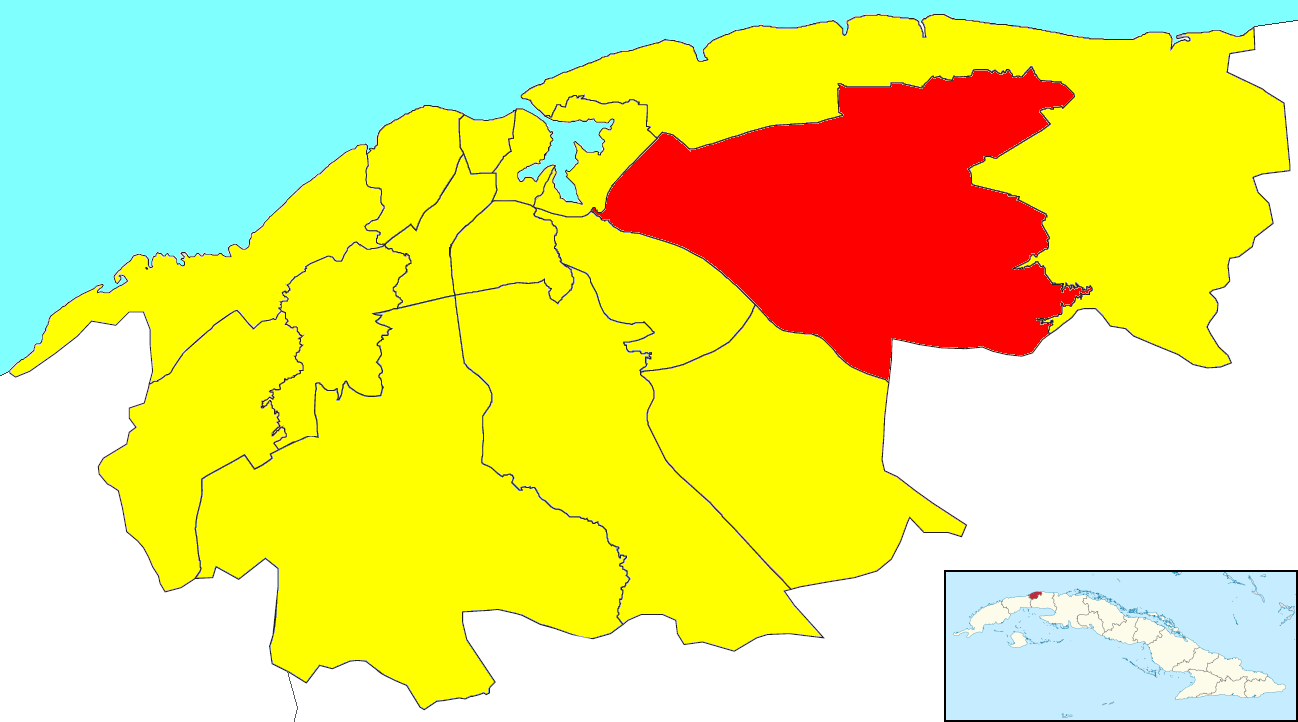
- Location of Guanabacoa in Havana
- Coordinates: 23°6′28″N 82°15′49″W
- Country: Cuba
- Province: Havana
- Founded: 1581
- Wards (Consejos Populares): Chivas-Roble, Debeche-Nalon, Hata-Naranjo, Mañana-Habana Nueva, Minas-Barreras, Peñalver-Bacuranao, Villa I, Villa II

Area
  - Total: 127 km^{2} (49 sq mi)

Population (2022)
  - Total: 128,666
  - Density: 1,010/km^{2} (2,620/sq mi)
- Time zone: UTC-5 (EST)
- Postal code: 10650
- Area code: +53-7

Guanabacoa is a colonial township in eastern Havana, Cuba, and one of the 15 municipalities (or boroughs) of the city. It is famous for its historical Santería and is home to the first African Cabildo in Havana. Guanabacoa was briefly the capital of Cuba in 1555 after Havana was attacked by French pirate Jacques de Sores. This gave rise to the Cuban saying "Like putting Havana in Guanabacoa," which is used to describe trying to fit something too large into a space too small. Guanabacoa was the site of the Battle of Guanabacoa, a skirmish between British and Spanish troops as part of the larger Battle of Havana during the Seven Years' War.

== Overview ==
The town of Guanabacoa is situated in the province of La Habana, some five kilometers (3.2 miles) to the southeast of La Habana (city) and south of the city of Regla. It rests on a small hill bordered by rivers.

Guanabacoa was also the home of a small community of Florida Indians, mostly Apalachees and Yamasees, who, along with Spanish forces, were evacuated from Florida in 1763, following the conclusion of the Seven Years' War.

== The Jewish Community ==
It is unknown when the Jewish Community developed in the town of Guanabacoa. In the late 1920s Samuel Epstein, owner of Aetna Knitted Fabrics from New York's Lower East Side, established Sedanita in rented facilities in Guanabacoa. The company imported $75,000 worth of equipment for the production of underwear, shawls, and scarves; it employed 200 workers. But, Jewish-owned businesses do not constitute a Jewish community. Sedanita moved to San José de las Lajas after it was sold to the Brandon family in the late 1930s.

It is clear that earlier there were other Jewish-owned light manufacturing plants in Guanabacoa as well. In the 1930s these included the factory of Charles Shapiro. From the available evidence, Shapiro's business went well. After Sedanita moved out, Shapiro bought the building that the Epsteins rented and used it to expand his own knitting and dying company.

By the 1940s there was a Jewish Community in Guanabacoa headquartered in the Centro Israelita at Calle Martí 252. There was also a WIZO branch. Records of the founding of the community are missing.

The Guanabacoa community apparently was business-oriented, and basing a community upon businesses is problematic. Even during the 1950s, the Jewish community in Guanabacoa was in decline. It was one of the early casualties of emigration after the Castro Revolution.

== Notable people ==
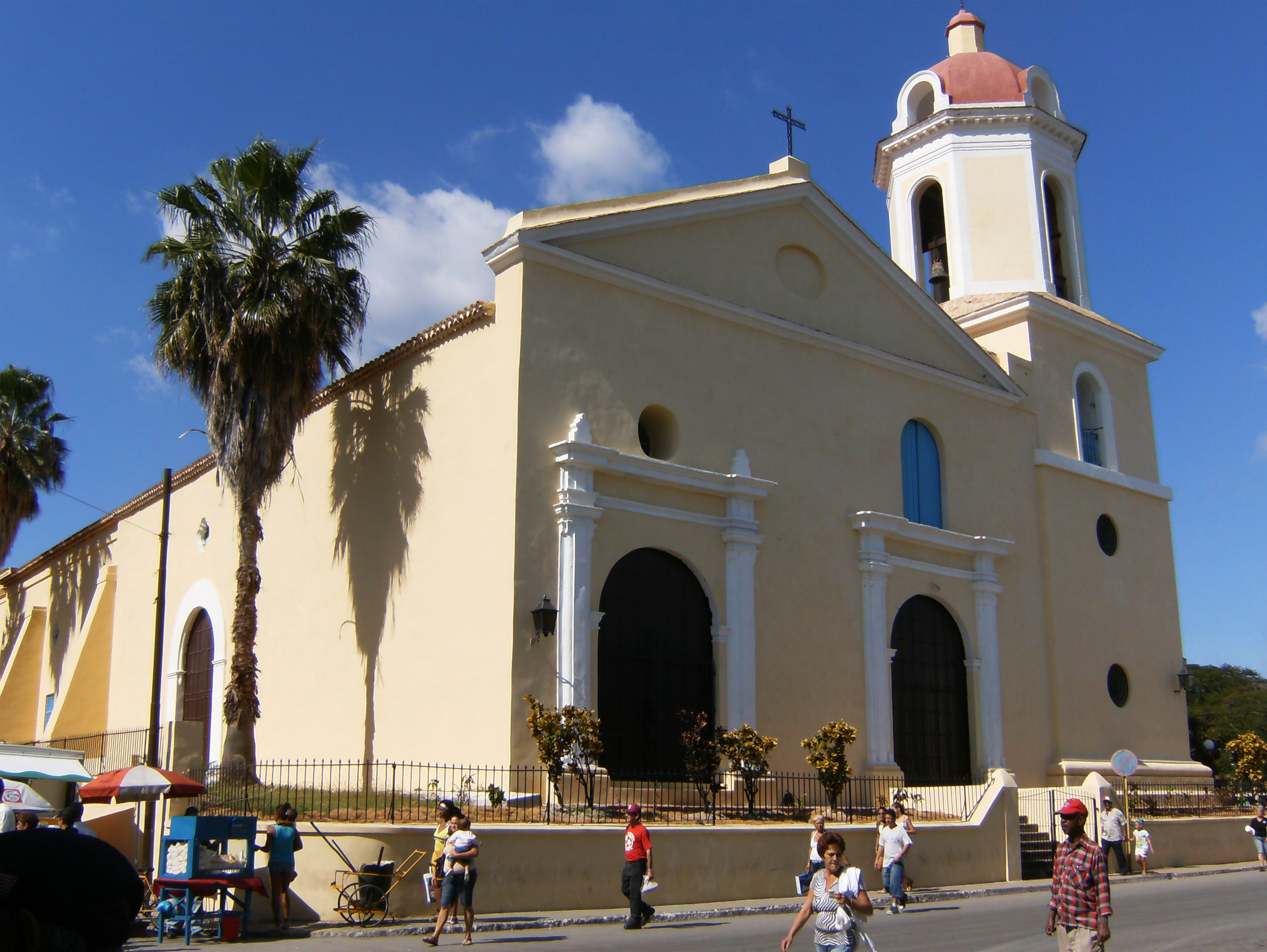
Guanabacoa Church

Four personalities of Cuban music were born in this town: Ernesto Lecuona, Rita Montaner, Ignacio Villa (Bola de Nieve), and the composer, writer and actress Dinorah Rivas, some of her compositions were played by famous musicians and singers such as Tito Puente and Milly Puente.

Four Major League Baseball players were also born here: Emilio Palmero (1895), Tony Ordeñana (1918), Rene Valdez (1929), and Evelio Hernández (1931), as well as the television news reporter Rick Sanchez.

The township was also the childhood home of Cuban singer, Lucrecia Saez Perez, hailed by many as a successor to the great Celia Cruz, and "The Myth," bodybuilder Sergio Oliva. Pedrito Calvo, vocalist from popular band Los Van Van for 27 years, was also born in Guanabacoa.

The journalist, historian, and writer María Argelia Vizcaíno was also born in Guanabacoa. She is the author of "Guanabacoa la Bella, Tomo I" (2006) among others.

== Climate ==
This area typically has a pronounced dry season. According to the Köppen Climate Classification system, Guanabacoa has a tropical savanna climate, abbreviated "Aw" on climate maps.
