= Eduardo Morera =

Argentine film director (1906–1997)

- Born: January 9, 1906; Buenos Aires
- Died: January 21, 1997 (aged 91)
- Occupation: Film director

Eduardo Morera (9 January 1906 – 21 January 1997) was an Argentine film director notable for his work during the classical era of Argentine cinema. Although his career was relatively short compared to other directors of the period, he directed 18 films between 1930 and 1943, including influential tango films such as 1937's Así es el tango. He worked with popular actors of the period such as Tita Merello and Tito Lusiardo.

== Filmography ==
- Añoranzas (1930)
- Canchero (1930)
- El Carretero (1930)
- Enfundá la mandolina (1930)
- Mano a mano (1930)
- Padrino Pelado (1930)
- Rosas de Otoño (1930)
- Tengo miedo (1930)
- Viejo smoking (1930)
- Yira, yira (1930)
- Diez canciones de Gardel (1931)
- Idolos de la radio (1934)
- Por buen camino (1935)
- Ya tiene comisario el pueblo (1936)
- Así es el tango (1937)
- Un Bebé de contrabando (1940)
- Melodies of America (1941)
- Rosas de otoño (1943)
